= 2024 in Australian sport =

The following is a list of events in sport, including expected and scheduled events, for the year 2024 in Australia.

== January ==
- 1 January – David Warner announces his retirement from One Day International cricket.
- 3 January –
  - Jarome Luai confirms he will be leaving the Penrith Panthers after the 2024 NRL season to join the Wests Tigers.
  - The third cricket test between Pakistan and Australia commences at the Sydney Cricket Ground with Pakistan winning the toss and electing the bat. It's David Warner's final test, and also the 16th time the January test at the SCG has been dubbed "The Pink Test".
- 6 January – Australia win the third cricket test against Pakistan by eight wickets, winning the series 3-0.
- 7 January –
  - Elena Rybakina wins the women's singles title at the 2024 Brisbane International, defeating Aryna Sabalenka, 6-0, 6-3.
  - Grigor Dimitrov wins the men's singles title at the 2024 Brisbane International, defeating Holger Rune, 7-6 (7/5), 6-4.
- 8 January – Germany wins the 2024 United Cup tennis tournament.
- 13 January –
  - The Socceroos win their first match in the AFC Asian Cup in Qatar, defeating India, 2-0.
  - Storm Boy, ridden by Adam Hyeronimus and trained by Gai Waterhouse, wins the Magic Millions Classic at the Gold Coast.
- 14 January – The 2024 Australian Open gets underway in Melbourne.
- 17 January – The first cricket test between Australia and the West Indies commences at the Adelaide Oval with Australia winning the toss and electing to bowl first. Notably, West Indian bowler Shamar Joseph on debut collects the wicket of Steve Smith with his first delivery in test cricket.
- 19 January –
  - Joe Schmidt is officially announced as the new coach of the Australia national rugby union team.
  - Australia defeat the West Indies by ten wickets on the third day of the first test at the Adelaide Oval, with Travis Head named as the player of the match.
- 21 January – Olympic swimmer Mack Horton announces his retirement, deciding not to compete in the 2024 Summer Olympics.
- 24 January – The final of the 2023–24 Big Bash League season is played at the Sydney Cricket Ground where the Brisbane Heat win against the Sydney Sixers by 54 runs.
- 27 January – Aryna Sabalenka wins the women's singles final at the 2024 Australian Open, defeating Zheng Qinwen 6-3, 6-2.
- 28 January –
  - The West Indies defeat Australia by eight runs in the second cricket test at The Gabba.
  - Jannik Sinner wins the men's singles final at the 2024 Australian Open, defeating Daniil Medvedev 3-6, 3-6, 6-4, 6-4, 6-3.
- 31 January – The Australian Cricket Awards are held in Melbourne where Mitchell Marsh wins the Allan Border Medal and Ash Gardner wins the Belinda Clark Award.

== February ==
- 2 February –
  - The Socceroos are defeated by South Korea 2-1 in the AFC Asian Cup quarterfinal at Al Janoub Stadium in Qatar.
  - Australia defeat the West Indies by eight wickets at the MCG in the first One Day International of a three-match series.
  - Alysha Koloi wins Australia's first gold medal at the 2024 World Aquatics Championships in Doha, winning gold in the 1-metre springboard event.
- 3 February – The Australia women's national cricket team defeat South Africa by 8 wickets at the Adelaide Oval in the first of three Women's One Day Internationals.
- 4 February – Australia defeat the West Indies by 83 runs at the SCG, in the second One Day International of the three-match series.
- 6 February – Australia defeat the West Indies by eight wickets in the third and final One Day International at Canberra's Manuka Oval after what becomes Australia's fastest ODI run chase in history, reaching a target of 87 in just 6.5 overs and winning the series 3-0.
- 7 February – The South Africa women's cricket team defeat Australia by 84 runs (DLS) at North Sydney Oval in the second of three WODIs.
- 8 February – The Australian open water swimming team of Moesha Johnson, Chelsea Gubecka, Nicholas Sloman and Kyle Lee win gold at the 2024 World Aquatic Championships in Doha.
- 9 February –
  - Former Australian rugby union player Kurtley Beale is acquitted of sexually assaulting a woman at a pub in Sydney in December 2022 when a jury finds Beale not guilty of one count of sexual intercourse without consent and two counts of sexual touching.
  - Australia beat the West Indies by 11 runs at Hobart's Bellerive Oval in the first of three Twenty20 Internationals.
- 10 February –
  - The Australia women's national cricket team defeat South Africa at North Sydney Oval in the third and final WODI by 110 runs (DLS), claiming a series win 2-1.
  - Australia's Domonic Bedggood and Maddison Keeney win gold in the mixed synchronised three metre springboard diving at the 2024 World Aquatic Championships in Doha.
  - A group of Australian Women's Ice Hockey League players as well as spectators are admitted to hospital for suspected carbon monoxide poisoning following a match between Melbourne Ice Hockey team and the Adelaide Rush at Ice Arena in Adelaide.
- 11 February –
  - A man is killed in a serious accident at the annual Southern 80 water skiing event on the Murray River at Moama/Echuca.
  - Australia beat the West Indies by 34 runs at the Adelaide Oval in the second of three Twenty20 Internationals, during which Glenn Maxwell scores the fastest T20 International century in Australia.
  - Mitch Wishnowsky becomes the first Australian to actually play in the United States of America's NFL Super Bowl when he represents the San Francisco 49ers in Super Bowl LVIII.
  - Brisbane Broncos players Patrick Carrigan and Adam Reynolds are filmed engaged in a drunken scuffle in Brisbane after the team's annual fan day.
- 14 February – Australia's Rhiannan Iffland wins gold in the women's high diving event at the 2024 World Aquatic Championships, while Samuel Williamson wins gold in the men's 50 metre breaststroke, setting a new Australian record.
- 16 February – The annual All Stars rugby league match is held at North Queensland Stadium, where the Indigenous All Stars defeat the Māori team 22-14 with Braydon Trindall winning man of the match. The Indigenous women's team also defeat the Māori women's team 26-4 with Kirra Dibb winning player of the match.
- 17 February – The Australia women's cricket team defeat South Africa by an innings and 284 runs in a standalone test at the WACA in Perth.
- 18 February –
  - Olympic equestrian Shane Rose is stood down from competition by Equestrian Australia while it conducts a review after receiving complaints after Rose wore a mankini during the Wallaby Hill Extravaganza in Robertson on 11 February. Equestrian Australia subsequently clears Rose of any wrongdoing, finding that he did not breach the code of conduct.
  - Australia's Isaac Cooper wins gold in the men's 50 metre backstroke at the 2024 World Aquatic Championships in Doha, while the Australian women's 4 x 100 metre medley relay team (Shayna Jack, Brianna Throssell, Abbey Harkin and Iona Anderson) also win gold.
- 20 February – The Australian cricket team win the first match of the T20I series in New Zealand, with Tim David hitting a boundary off the last ball of the game to secure victory against New Zealand.
- 21 February –
  - Melbourne AFL player Angus Brayshaw announces his retirement after receiving medical advice following a collision with Brayden Maynard in the 2023 qualifying final against Collingwood.
  - Veteran sports broadcaster Karen Tighe announces her departure from the ABC after 35 years of covering sport on both television and radio.
- 28 February – The Matildas defeat Uzbekistan 10-0 at Docklands Stadium to qualify for the 2024 Summer Olympics.

== March ==
- 1 March – Roger Kerr confirms his daughter Sam Kerr is ruled out of playing for The Matildas in the 2024 Summer Olympics due to her knee injury.
- 3 March –
  - The 2024 NRL season commences in Las Vegas, with the first two games of Round 1 played Allegiant Stadium. (Note: Australian Eastern Standard Time)
  - Australia defeat New Zealand by 172 runs in the first match of the 2024 Trans-Tasman test series in Wellington.
  - Hannah Green wins the LPGA Women's World Championship in Singapore.
- 4 March – Matildas captain Sam Kerr pleads not guilty in Kingston upon Thames Crown Court after being charged on 21 January 2024 with racially aggravated harassment of a police officer following an alleged incident on 30 January 2023. Kerr is due to face trial at Wimbledon Magistrates Court on 1 February 2025.
- 7 March –
  - The Australian Olympic Team's uniform for the 2024 Summer Olympics is unveiled in Sydney.
  - The 2024 AFL season gets underway at the SCG with the Sydney Swans defeating the Melbourne Demons by 22 points.
- 8 March –
  - North Melbourne coach Alistair Clarkson is fined $20,000 and issued with a suspended two-match ban after allegedly using a homophobic slur while addressing players Jimmy Webster and Dougal Howard during a pre-season match on 3 March.
  - In what is described as an "all time thriller", the Carlton Blues beat the Brisbane Lions by just 1 point in a 46-point comeback in their Opening Round match at The Gabba.
- 11 March –
  - Australia defeats New Zealand by three wickets in the second test match at Hagley Oval in Christchurch.
  - Spencer Leniu from the Sydney Roosters receives an eight-week suspension from the NRL Judiciary after pleading guilty to contrary conduct for a racial slur directed towards Brisbane Broncos player Ezra Mam during the round one match in Las Vegas on 3 March.
- 14 March – South Sydney Rabbitohs player Latrell Mitchell swears multiple times in a live post-match interview with Triple M's Ben Dobbin. The incident prompts several rugby league commentators and former players to criticise Mitchell with some also accusing the NRL failing to sanction Mitchell for his conduct. The controversy also prompts complaints from Nine Entertainment and the Rabbitohs about Dobbin's interview being filmed and shared to social media despite Triple M having audio-only rights at NRL games.
- 17 March – Australian short track speed skater Brendan Corey wins bronze in the Men's 1500m event at the 2024 World Short Track Speed Skating Championships in Rotterdam.
- 18 March –
  - Queensland premier Steven Miles announces the state government is rejecting an independent review led by Graham Quirk which proposes a new stadium be built in Victoria Park at a cost of $3.4 billion for the 2032 Summer Olympics and Paralympics and says the government is instead considering an upgrade to both Queensland Sport and Athletics Centre and Lang Park. Miles' announcement triggers much public debate.
  - Tasmania's new AFL and AFLW club, the Tasmania Devils is officially launched in Hobart.
- 21 March – Former Perth Wildcats NBL basketball player Kendal Pinder is sentenced in the Downing Centre District Court in Sydney to eight years imprisonment (with a five-year non-parole period) after being convicted of two violent sexual assaults in 2009 and 2021.
- 22 March – A 22-year-old man is arrested and charged with entering an oval during a scheduled event and banned from the Adelaide Oval at least for three years after allegedly invading the pitch during the AFL match between the Adelaide Crows and the Geelong Cats. The man's alleged behaviour is widely condemned.
- 23 March – The Gai Waterhouse and Adrian Bott-trained Lady of Camelot, ridden by Blake Shinn, wins the 2024 Golden Slipper Stakes at Rosehill Gardens Racecourse.
- 24 March – The 2024 Australian Grand Prix is won by Ferrari's Carlos Sainz Jr.
- 25 March – Western Australia win the Sheffield Shield for the third consecutive year, defeating Tasmania by 377 runs at the WACA.
- 26 March – Independent federal MP Andrew Wilkie uses parliamentary privilege to raise allegations of misconduct within the Australian Football League pertaining to secret "off the books" drug testing of AFL players, claiming players who test positive are asked to fake injuries to avoid detection on game day. The allegations prompt Sport Integrity Australia to assess the allegations.
- 28 March – Former AFL player Eddie Betts posts CCTV vision from his home on social media appearing to show his children being racially abused by a passing motorist as they played basketball in their backyard. The alleged actions of the driver attracts widespread condemnation, with Victoria Police confirming they were investigating the incident.
- 30 March – Tim Tszyu is defeated by Sebastian Fundora in Las Vegas losing his WBC super welterweight belt, in his first defeat in 25 fights. (Note: Pacific Time)
- 31 March – The Tasmania JackJumpers win their first NBL title, defeating Melbourne United 83-81 at John Cain Arena in the 2024 NBL Finals.

== April ==
- 1 April – The Stawell Gift is held, despite being delayed more than two hours due to storms in western Victoria.The men's final is won by Jack Lacey while the women's final is won by Chloe Mannix-Power.
- 5 April – Former Australia national rugby union team captain Michael Hooper makes his rugby sevens debut in Hong Kong in his first World Rugby Sevens Series match, where Australia defeats Fiji 12-0.
- 6 April – Chain of Lightning, Riff Rocket and Celestial Legend are the respective winning horses in the TJ Smith Stakes, the Australian Derby and the Doncaster Handicap at Royal Randwick Racecourse.
- 8 April – NRL player Latrell Mitchell from the South Sydney Rabbitohs is suspended for three weeks after pleading guilty to a dangerous conduct charge after hitting New Zealand Warriors player Shaun Johnson with his elbow during the match on 6 April.
- 10 April – AFL player Jeremy Finlayson from the Port Adelaide Power is suspended for three matches for using a homophobic slur against an Essendon Bombers player during the match on 5 April. He will also be required to attend Pride in Sport training.
- 11 April – The Sydney Roosters allow Michael Jennings to lead them out onto the field in Newcastle to mark his 300th game, after the NRL decides not to celebrate the milestone with the usual fanfare due to Jennings' past conduct.
- 17 April – Boxing Australia's national coach Jamie Pittman withdraws from the 2024 Olympic Games after being found by the National Sports Tribunal to have committed sexual misconduct.
- 21 April – Australian surfer Jack Robinson wins the Margaret River Pro, defeating Hawaii's John John Florence.
- 22 April – Skateboarder Arisa Trew receives the Laureus World Sports Award for Action Sportsperson of the Year at the Laureus World Sports Awards.
- 24 April – Racehorse trainer Darren Weir is cleared by the Victorian Racing Tribunal of allegations he used a jigger on horses with the intention of corrupting the outcome of the 2018 Melbourne Cup.
- 26 April – The LIV Golf Adelaide tournament commences at The Grange Golf Club, which is ultimately won by American golfer Brendan Steele.
- 30 April – Jason Demetriou is sacked as the head coach of the South Sydney Rabbitohs.

== May ==
- 1 May –
  - Mitchell Marsh is appointed as captain of the Australian men's cricket team for the T20 World Cup.
  - Rugby league journalist Paul Kent is arrested and charged with affray after an alleged incident at a restaurant in Sydney, with Fox Sports and News Corp earlier issuing a statement on 28 April revealing Kent had been stood down from his duties pending an investigation into the incident. Kent was replaced on Fox Sport's NRL 360 by James Graham. It had been reported on 30 April that Kent was being treated in hospital with a suspected collapsed lung and approximately five broken ribs.
- 2 May – Canterbury-Bankstown Bulldogs general manager Phil Gould is issued with a $20,000 fine by the National Rugby League after comments he made on the Nine Network's 100% Footy, where he took issue with various rules of the game.
- 9 May – NRL player David Fifita agrees to a four-year deal with the Sydney Roosters, confirming he will leave the Gold Coast Titans at the end of the 2024 NRL season. However, he later backflips on the decision deciding to re-sign with the Titans.
- 11 May –
  - Ben O'Connor finishes third in the eighth stage of the 2024 Giro d'Italia cycling race in Italy.
  - The Wallaroos are defeated by Canada 33-14 at Sydney Football Stadium in their first game of the 2024 Pacific Four Series.
- 13 May –
  - The NRL confirms it is investigating allegations of a fan racially abusing Latrell Mitchell and Cody Walker during the South Sydney Rabbitohs' Round 10 game against the St. George Illawarra Dragons at Kogarah Oval on 11 May.
  - Football Australia issues a Western Sydney Wanderers fan with a two-year ban effectively immediately after they were captured during a television broadcast performing the Nazi salute after an A-League game at Sydney Football Stadium. New South Wales Police also confirm they are continuing to investigate the incident but are yet to make any arrests.
  - The Sydney Olympic Park Aquatic Centre is evacuated during the New South Wales Combined High School Swimming Carnvial after solar panels on the roof catch fire.
- 14 May – The U.S. Center for SafeSport rules that Australian figure skater Brendan Kerry is banned for sexual misconduct with a minor, preventing him from competing in any events controlled by the United States Olympic & Paralympic Committee. Kerry denies any wrongdoing and intends to appeal the decision.
- 15 May – In a surprising backflip, David Fifita announces he has decided against joining the Sydney Roosters, instead deciding to re-sign with the Gold Coast Titans.
- 16 May –
  - Former Olympic basketballer and Australian Basketball Hall of Fame inductee Danny Morseu is found guilty of one count of bodily harm after punching a woman in the head eight times, and is sentenced to 18 months in prison, suspended after four months.
  - New South Wales defeats Queensland 22-12 in the first game of the Women's State of Origin series in Brisbane.
- 18 May – Football Australia issues no-fault suspensions to Macarthur FC A-League Men players Ulises Davila, Clayton Lewis and Kearyn Baccus after they were arrested and charged by the NSW Police Organised Crime Squad Gaming Unit for allegedly being involved in betting corruption.
- 20 May –
  - Widespread job cuts are announced at Greyhound Racing NSW in an attempt to cut costs.
  - Brad Arthur is sacked as the coach of the Parramatta Eels.
- 21 May – Dolphins coach Wayne Bennett confirms he is returning to the South Sydney Rabbitohs from 2025 after signing a three-year contract.

== June ==
- 1 June – The West Coast Eagles' live mascot "Auzzie the Eagle" escapes after doing its traditional pre-match flight of Perth Stadium prior to the game against St Kilda, and flies to various parts of the stadium before it is eventually recaptured.
- 3 June – The Matildas defeat China 2-0 in a friendly game at Stadium Australia, marking the final time the Matildas play in Australia before competing in the 2024 Summer Olympics in Paris.
- 4 June – The Matildas name the 18 players who will be competing at the 2024 Olympic Games in Paris, with Clare Hunt, Kaitlyn Torpey, Clare Wheeler and Cortnee Vine set to make their Olympic debut when the team plays Germany on 26 July.
- 5 June – Queensland defeat New South Wales 38-10 in the first game of the 2024 State of Origin series, with New South Wales forced to play most of the game a man down with Joseph-Aukuso Sua'ali'i sent off by referee Ashley Klein after just eight minutes after Reece Walsh is knocked out during a tackle.
- 6 June – Queensland defeat New South Wales 11-10 in the second game of the Women's State of Origin at the Newcastle International Sports Centre, with a 69th minute field goal by Lauren Jones providing the Maroons with the winning point.
- 10–15 June – The 2024 Australian Swimming Trials are held at the Brisbane Aquatic Centre to determine who will be competing at the 2024 Olympic Games. During the trials, Ariarne Titmus set a new world record in the Women's 200m freestyle. Among those to miss out are Cate Campbell who reaches the end of her competitive swimming career, and Cody Simpson.
- 14 June – Following the Brisbane Lions Round 13 win over the Western Bulldogs on 7 June, The Age columnist Kate Halfpenny writes an opinion piece questioning whether it was appropriate for Lions player Lachie Neale to give Channel 7 commentator and former AFLW player Abbey Holmes a kiss on the cheek at the end of the post-match interview. The article generates much public discussion, and is criticised by Holmes who said she is frustrated that her professionalism has been questioned.
- 23 June – Former Gold Coast high school student Amy Yang wins the 2024 Women's PGA Championship.
- 26 June - New South Wales defeat Queensland 38-18 in the second game of the 2024 State of Origin series at the Melbourne Cricket Ground, forcing the series to a decider in the third game at Suncorp Stadium. New South Wales set a record for the number of points scored in the first half of a State of Origin game with 34 unanswered points. The attendance of 90,084 is the highest recorded crowd for a State of Origin game since Game 2 of 2015, which was also played at the MCG.
- 27 June - Queensland defeat New South Wales 22-6 in the deciding third and final game of the 2024 Women's State of Origin at Queensland Country Bank Stadium in Townsville, winning the inaugural three-game edition of the series.

== July ==
- 3 July – Paralympics Australia CEO Catherine Clark resigns from her position, just eight weeks prior to the commencement of the 2024 Summer Paralympics.
- 4 July – Prior to the second First Nations round of the 2024 Suncorp Super Netball season, Donnell Wallam receives hate mail which is described by Netball Australia as "disgusting racial abuse". In the widely condemned letter, the author blames Wallam for Hancock Prospecting withdrawing sponsorship in 2022 telling Wallam to "hang her head in shame for being manipulated by radical Aboriginal filth."
- 6 July – The Australia national rugby union team defeat Wales 25–16 at Sydney Football Stadium in the first Test played during Joe Schmidt's tenure as coach. The Wallaroos also defeat Fijiana 64-5.
- 11 July – Max Purcell and Jordan Thompson progress through to final of the men's doubles at the 2024 Wimbledon Championships after defeating Marcel Granollers and Horacio Zeballos 6-4 6-4.
- 12 July –
  - Jessica Hull breaks the women's 2000 metre world record at the Monaco Diamond League.
  - Madison de Rozario and Brenden Hall are announced as the Australian flag bearers for the 2024 Summer Paralympics.
- 13 July – Max Purcell and Jordan Thompson are defeated by Harri Heliövaara and Henry Patten in the men's doubles final at the 2024 Wimbledon Championships.
- 14 July – Australian baseball player Travis Bazzana is selected first in the 2024 MLB draft by the Cleveland Guardians.
- 17 July – New South Wales win the third State of Origin game in Brisbane defeating Queensland 14-4, winning the 2024 State of Origin series 2-1.
- 18 July – Volleyball Australia issues an apology to players who were based at the Australian Institute of Sport between 1997 and 2005 for having experienced an "environment of fear" which included physical and psychological abuse.
- 20 July – The final two races at Eagle Farm Racecourse are called off when jockeys begin a boycott and refuse to continue riding at the venue due to safety concerns relating to the construction of a new apartment complex near the home turn.
- 21 July – Oscar Piastri wins the 2024 Hungarian Grand Prix.
- 23 July – Two Australian water polo players scheduled to compete in the Paris Olympics test positive to COVID-19.
- 24 July –
  - Amid growing security concerns and following the alleged gang-rape of an Australian woman and the alleged assault of two broadcast technicians, Australian chef de mission Anna Meares encourages Australian athletes in Paris for the 2024 Summer Olympics to consider not wearing their team uniforms outside the Olympic Village for their own safety.
  - Jess Fox and Eddie Ockenden are announced as Australian flag bearers for the 2024 Summer Olympics in Paris.
- 25 July – In their opening group game at the Paris Olympics, the Matildas are defeated by Germany 3-0. (Note: Central European Summer Time)
- 27 July –
  - Grace Brown becomes Australia's first gold medal winner at the 2024 Paris Olympics, winning gold in the women's road cycling time trial.
  - Ariarne Titmus wins gold in the women's 400 metre freestyle final at the 2024 Paris Olympics.
  - Mollie O'Callaghan, Shayna Jack, Emma McKeon and Meg Harris claim gold for Australia, winning the women's 4 x 100 metre freestyle relay final at the 2024 Paris Olympics.
- 28 July – Jess Fox wins gold in the women's slalom K-1 canoeing event at the 2024 Paris Olympics.
- 29 July – Mollie O'Callaghan wins gold in the women's 200 metre freestyle final at the 2024 Paris Olympics.
- 30 July – Kaylee McKeown wins gold in the women's 100 metre backstroke final at the 2024 Paris Olympics.
- 31 July – Jess Fox wins gold in the women's slalom C-1 canoeing event at the 2024 Paris Olympics.

== August ==
- 1 August –
  - The Matildas part ways with coach Tony Gustavsson following their defeat against the United States at the 2024 Paris Olympics.
  - Mollie O'Callaghan, Lani Pallister, Ariarne Titmus and Brianna Throssell win gold in the women's 4 x 200 m freestyle relay final at the 2024 Paris Olympics.
- 2 August –
  - Saya Sakakibara wins gold in the women's BMX racing at the 2024 Paris Olympics.
  - Cameron McEvoy wins gold in the men's 50 m freestyle at the 2024 Paris Olympics.
  - Kaylee McKeown wins gold in the women's 200 m backstroke at the 2024 Paris Olympics.
- 3 August – Matthew Ebden and John Peers win gold in the men's doubles tennis at the 2024 Paris Olympics.
- 5 August – Noémie Fox wins gold in the women's slalom kayak cross event at the 2024 Paris Olympics.
- 6 August –
  - Richmond Tigers player Dustin Martin announces his retirement from the AFL effective immediately.
  - 14-year-old Arisa Trew becomes Australia's youngest ever gold medallist after winning gold in the women's park skateboarding event at the 2024 Paris Olympics.
- 7 August –
  - The Australian Olympic Committee confirms an Australian hockey player is in custody after being arrested by police in Paris, after they allegedly attempted to purchase cocaine. The player is identified as Tom Craig who is released without charge, but delivers a statement to the media during which he apologises and admits he made a "terrible mistake" which he takes "full responsibility for", accepting that he has "embarrassed" his family, teammates, friends, his sport and the Australian Olympic team.
  - Matthew Wearn wins gold in the men's laser sailing event at the 2024 Paris Olympics.
  - Keegan Palmer wins gold in the men's park skateboarding event at the 2024 Paris Olympics.
  - Oliver Bleddyn, Kelland O'Brien, Sam Welsford and Conor Leahy win gold in the men's team pursuit cycling event at the 2024 Paris Olympics.
  - Nina Kennedy wins gold in the women's pole vault event at the 2024 Paris Olympics.
- 8 August – NRL player Jake Granville officially announces he has left the North Queensland Cowboys following a season-ending pectoral injury but will explore opportunities overseas in 2025 to continue playing rugby league.
- 9 August – 36-year-old university lecturer Rachael Gunn becomes Australia's first Olympic breakdancing competitor. However, her routine fails to impress the judges and is eliminated in the round robin stages. Her routine becomes the subject of worldwide ridicule and trolling which Australian chef de mission Anna Meares describes as "really disappointing."
- 11 August – Kaylee McKeown and Matt Wearn lead Australia out as the flagbearers at the 2024 Summer Olympics closing ceremony.
- 24 August –
  - The Sydney Swans secure the AFL's minor premiership after defeating the Adelaide Crows by 31 points.
  - The Melbourne Storm secure the NRL's minor premiership after defeating the Dolphins 48-6.
- 29 August – Thomas Gallagher wins Australia's first gold medal at the 2024 Summer Paralympics, winning the Men's 50 metre freestyle S14.
- 30 August
  - Korey Boddington wins gold in the men's time trial C4-5 cycling event at the 2024 Paris Paralympics.
  - Emily Petricola wins gold in the women's C4 3000 metre individual pursuit cycling event at the 2024 Paris Parlympics.
- 31 August
  - Amanda Reid wins gold in the women's time trial C1-3 cycling event at the 2024 Paris Paralympics.
  - Lei Lina and Yang Qian win gold in table tennis at the 2024 Paris Paralympics.
  - The Wallabies narrowly defeat The Pumas 20-19 in Round 3 of the 2024 Rugby Championship in La Plata.

== September ==
- 1 September – Nikki Ayers and Jed Altschwager win gold in the PR3 mixed double sculls rowing event at the 2024 Paris Paralympics.
- 2 September –
  - Lauren Parker wins gold in the women's PTWC Paratriathlon at the 2024 Paris Paralympics.
  - Jesse Aungles, Timothy Hodge, Emily Beecroft and Alexa Leary win the final of the mixed 4 x 100 metre medley relay 34 pts swimming event at the Paris Paralympics.
- 3 September – James Turner wins gold in the men's 400 metre T36 athletics event at Paris Paralympics.
- 4 September –
  - Yang Qian wins gold in the women's singles WS10 table tennis event at Paris Paralympics.
  - Alexa Leary wins gold in the women's 100 metre freestyle S9 swimming event at Paris Paralympics.
- 5 September –
  - Lauren Parker wins gold in the women's road race H1-4 cycling event at the Paris Paralympics.
  - Timothy Hodge wins gold in the men's 200 metre individual medley swimming event at the Paris Paralympics.
  - Vanessa Low wins gold in the women's long jump T63 event at the Paris Paralympics and sets a new world record.
- 6 September –
  - Benjamin Hance wins gold in the men's 100 metre backstroke S14 swimming event at the Paris Paralympics, breaking the world record.
  - Callum Simpson wins gold in the men's 100 metre freestyle S8 swimming event at the Paris Paralympics.
  - Swimming Australia coach Michael Palfrey is sacked due to a breach of his employment agreement after publicly supporting South Korean swimmer Kim Woo-min in the lead up to the Paris Olympics.
- 7 September –
  - James Turner wins gold in the men's 100 metre T36 athletics event at the Paris Paralympics.
  - Curtis McGrath wins gold in the men's KL2 paracanoeing event at the Paris Paralympics.
- 8 September –
  - Liam Boudin and Genevieve Gregson win their respective male and female titles at the 2024 Bridge to Brisbane.
  - Lauren Parker and James Turner carry the Australian flag at the 2024 Summer Paralympics closing ceremony with Australia finishing the Games with the lowest medal ranking in 36 years.
- 9 September – Melbourne Storm are awarded the minor premiership following the conclusion of the 2024 NRL season. Wests Tigers finish in last position for the third consecutive year, claiming the wooden spoon.
- 11 September – Australia defeats England by 28 runs at Rose Bowl in the first game of the T20I series in England.
- 13 September – England defeat Australia by 3 wickets at Sophia Gardens in the second game of the T20I series in England.
- 14 September – At the semi-final between the Brisbane Lions and GWS Giants at Sydney Olympic Park, cultural educator Brendan Kerin makes comments during the Welcome to Country in which he states: "A Welcome to Country is not a ceremony we've invented to cater for white people. It's a ceremony we've been doing for 250,000 years-plus BC - and the BC stands for Before Cook." The comments ignite a public debate about the relevance such ceremonies at sporting events.
- 15 September – The third match of the T20I series between England and Australia which was scheduled to be played at Old Trafford is abandoned due to rain, with the series ending in a draw.
- 19 September –
  - Australia defeat New Zealand by five wickets in the opening match of the Women's T20I series at Great Barrier Reef Arena in Mackay - the first Women's Twenty20 International game to be played at the venue.
  - Australia defeats England by seven wickets at Trent Bridge in the first game of the ODI series in England, helped by Travis Head's unbeaten 154 - the highest ODI score by an Australian in England.
- 21 September – The Wallabies are defeated by the All Blacks 31-28 at Stadium Australia, with New Zealand retaining the Bledisloe Cup.
- 21 September – Australia defeat England by 68 runs at Headingley Cricket Ground in the second match of the ODI series.
- 22 September – Australia defeat New Zealand by 29 runs in the second match of the Women's T20I series at Great Barrier Reef Arena in Mackay.
- 23 September – Carlton captain Patrick Cripps wins the 2024 Brownlow Medal.
- 24 September –
  - Completing a clean sweep of the series, Australia defeats New Zealand by five wickets in the third and final match of the Women's T20I series at Allan Border Field in Brisbane.
  - England defeat Australia by 46 runs (DLS) at the Riverside Ground in Durham in the third match of the ODI series.
- 26 September –
  - Kevin Walters is sacked as the head coach of the Brisbane Broncos following a disappointing season in which the team finished in 12th spot on the ladder.
  - Daniel Ricciardo is dropped by the RB Formula One Team following the 2024 Singapore Grand Prix and replaced by Liam Lawson, with Ricciardo's career ending without a farewell race.
  - PETA calls on the Western Bulldogs to retire its live bulldog mascots and urges them to change its name to the Western Mutts to encourage fans to adopt from local dog shelters. The push is criticised by multiple AFL identities including Kane Cornes, David King and Doug Hawkins while Animal Justice Party MP Georgie Purcell describes the campaign as not being the "right approach", stating: "there's other ways that we can address this in a more meaningful way that actually does something for the protection of brachy breeds and animal welfare in Victoria."
- 27 September – England defeat Australia by 186 runs at Lord's Cricket Ground in the fourth match of the ODI series.
- 28 September – The Brisbane Lions win the 2024 AFL Grand Final at the MCG defeating the Sydney Swans, 18.12 (120) to 9.6 (60).
- 29 September – Australia defeat England by 49 runs (DLS) at the Bristol County Ground in the fifth and final match of the ODI series in which Cooper Connolly makes his One Day International debut. Australia win the series 3-2.

== October ==
- 5 October – Via Sistina ridden by Damian Lane and trained by Chris Waller wins the Turnbull Stakes.
- 6 October –
  - The Sydney Roosters Women win the 2024 NRLW Grand Final at Stadium Australia defeating the Cronulla-Sutherland Sharks Women 32-28.
  - The Penrith Panthers win the 2024 NRL Grand Final at Stadium Australia defeating the Melbourne Storm 14-6, with Liam Martin winning the Clive Churchill Medal. The Panthers become the first team to win four consecutive grand finals since the St. George Dragons won eleven consecutive premierships between 1956 and 1966.
- 10 October – Brisbane Broncos player Corey Oates announces his retirement from professional rugby league.
- 11 October – Essendon confirm they were contacted by the AFL's integrity department after a convicted killer who was sentenced in 2018 to five years jail for fatally shooting a 20-year-old man in 2016 was permitted access to the Essendon changerooms following a match against Collingwood on 5 July 2024.
- 12 October – Private Life ridden by Damian Lane and trained by Dominic Sutton, wins the Caulfield Guineas.
- 13 October – Erebus Motorsport's Brodie Kostecki and Todd Hazelwood win the Bathurst 1000.
- 17 October – The AFL confirms it has punished 13 GWS Giants players for conduct unbecoming in relation to inappropriate behaviour at an end-of-season event on 18 September 2024. Josh Fahey is suspended for four matches, while two-week bans are issued to Jake Riccardi, Joe Fonti, Toby McMullin, Harvey Thomas and Cooper Hamilton. Captain Toby Greene as well as Lachie Whitfield, Connor Idun, Tom Green, Sam Taylor, Lachie Keeffe and Harry Perryman are all fined $5,000. Giants CEO David Matthews says the players' behaviour was inexcusable. It's also confirmed education sessions would be provided for the playing group relating to religious and racial vilification as well as violence against women.
- 19 October –
  - Bella Nipotina ridden by Craig Williams and trained by Ciaron Maher wins The Everest at Randwick Racecourse.
  - Duke De Sessa ridden by Harry Coffey and trained by Ciaron Maher wins the Caulfield Cup at Caulfield Racecourse.
- 26 October – Via Sistina, ridden by James McDonald and trained by Chris Waller, wins the W. S. Cox Plate at Moonee Valley Racecourse.

== November ==
- 2 November – Goldrush Guru trained by Andrew Gluyas and ridden by Jamie Kah wins the Victoria Derby at Flemington Racecourse.
- 4 November – Australia defeat Pakistan by two wickets in the first One Day International at the Melbourne Cricket Ground.
- 5 November – Outsider Knight's Choice trained by Sheila Laxon and ridden by former The Voice contestant Robbie Dolan wins the 2024 Melbourne Cup at Flemington Racecourse.
- 8 November – Pakistan defeat Australia by nine wickets in the second One Day International at the Adelaide Oval.
- 9 November – The Wallabies defeat England 42-37 at Twickenham Stadium.
- 25 November-
  - Emma McKeon announces her retirement from competitive swimming.
  - India defeat Australia by 295 runs in 1st Test in the Border–Gavaskar Trophy at the Perth Stadium. The player of the match is Jasprit Bumrah.
  - AusCycling confirms Matthew Richadson will never be allowed to compete for Australia again after defecting to Great Britain. However, Richardson avoids a two-year ban from competition after a review finds that he asked Union Cycliste Internationale to delay disclosing his decision to defect until after he had competed for Australia at the 2024 Summer Olympics in Paris.
- 30 November – The North Melbourne Kangaroos defeat the Brisbane Lions in the 2024 AFL Women's Grand Final at Melbourne's Princes Park.

== December ==
- 5 December – 87-year-old former competitive swimmer Dawn Fraser undergoes emergency surgery on her hip in a Sunshine Coast hospital after being admitted to the intensive care unit after receiving multiple serious injuries in a fall at her daughter's home.
- 8 December – Australia defeats India by ten wickets in the second cricket test at the Adelaide Oval. The player of the match in Travis Head.
- 12 December – Anthony Albanese, James Marape and Peter V'landys announce that Papua New Guinea will enter the National Rugby League competition in 2028 in a $600 million deal, with Port Moresby to host home games.
- 15 December – The Melbourne Storm announce that they will no longer hold Welcome to Country ceremonies prior to their home games, with the exception of the NRL's Indigenous round.
- 16 December – Fox Sports cricket commentator Isa Guha publicly apologises for having described Indian bowler Jasprit Bumrah as the "Most Valuable Primate" during the second day of the second test between Australia and India at The Gabba.
- 18 December – The third cricket test between Australia and India at The Gabba ends in a draw. Travis Head is again player of the match, while Ravichandran Ashwin announces his retirement following the match.
- 26 December – Two participants are killed in separate incidents during the Sydney to Hobart Yacht Race.
- 27 December – The 2025 United Cup tennis tournament commences in Perth and Sydney.
- 29 December – LawConnect claims line honours in the 2024 Sydney to Hobart Yacht Race for the second year in a row while Celestial V70 is subsequently named as the overall provisional winner.
  - The 2025 Canberra Tennis International commences at the Canberra International Tennis Centre.
- 30 December -
  - Australia defeat India by 184 runs in the Boxing Day Test at the Melbourne Cricket Ground in a match that is described as a "an all-time classic." Pat Cummins is named the player of the match.
  - The 2025 Brisbane International tennis tournament commences, which includes the long awaited return of Nick Kyrgios.

== See also ==
- 2024 in Australia
- 2024 in sports
- Sport in Australia
