= 2024 Brisbane International – Men's doubles =

Men's doubles
- 2024 Brisbane International

Final
- Champions: (United Kingdom) Lloyd Glasspool (Netherlands) Jean-Julien Rojer
- Runners-up: (Germany) Kevin Krawietz (Germany) Tim Pütz
- Score: 7–6^{(7–3)}, 5–7, [12–10]

Events
| Singles | men | women |
| Doubles | men | women |
- Brisbane International

Lloyd Glasspool and Jean-Julien Rojer defeated Kevin Krawietz and Tim Pütz in the final, 7–6^{(7–3)}, 5–7, [12–10] to win the men's doubles tennis title at the 2024 Brisbane International.

Marcus Daniell and Wesley Koolhof were the reigning champions from 2019, when the men's event was last held, but Koolhof chose to compete in the United Cup instead. Daniell partnered Michael Venus, but lost in the first round to Romain Arneodo and Sam Weissborn.

This marked the final match for Marc López who came out of his retirement to play with Rafael Nadal for the very last time.

== Seeds ==
All seeds received a bye into the second round.

1. (Germany) Kevin Krawietz / (Germany) Tim Pütz (final)
2. (United Kingdom) Lloyd Glasspool / (Netherlands) Jean-Julien Rojer (champions)
3. (United States) Nathaniel Lammons / (United States) Jackson Withrow (quarterfinals)
4. (Australia) Rinky Hijikata / (Australia) Jason Kubler (second round)
5. (Croatia) Nikola Mektić / (Monaco) Hugo Nys (second round)
6. (Finland) Harri Heliövaara / (Australia) John Peers (second round)
7. (Ecuador) Gonzalo Escobar / (Kazakhstan) Aleksandr Nedovyesov (quarterfinals)
8. (India) Yuki Bhambri / (Netherlands) Robin Haase (semifinals)

== Draw ==
Key

- Q = Qualifier
- WC = Wild card
- LL = Lucky loser
- Alt = Alternate
- ITF = ITF entry
- PR = Protected ranking
- SR = Special ranking
- SE = Special exempt
- JE = Junior exempt
- JR = Junior Accelerator Programme entrant
- CO = College Accelerator Programme entrant
- NG = Next Gen Accelerator Program entrant
- w/o = Walkover
- r = Retired
- d = Defaulted

=== Finals ===
Semifinals
1 | (Germany) Kevin Krawietz (Germany) Tim Pütz | w/o
(Australia) Max Purcell (Australia) Jordan Thompson
8 | (India) Yuki Bhambri (Netherlands) Robin Haase | 3 | 7^{7} | [9]
2 | (United Kingdom) Lloyd Glasspool (Netherlands) Jean-Julien Rojer | 6 | 6^{5} | [11]

Final
1 | (Germany) Kevin Krawietz (Germany) Tim Pütz | 6^{3} | 7 | [10]
2 | (United Kingdom) Lloyd Glasspool (Netherlands) Jean-Julien Rojer | 7^{7} | 5 | [12]

=== Top half ===
First round
WC | (Australia) J Duckworth (Australia) C O'Connell | w/o
(Italy) M Arnaldi (Argentina) TM Etcheverry
A Karatsev; R Safiullin | 4 | 6 | [10]
(United Kingdom) A Murray (Denmark) H Rune | 6 | 3 | [5]
Alt | (Argentina) S Báez (Argentina) F Comesaña | 4 | 6^{6}
(Germany) A Mies (Australia) J-P Smith | 6 | 7^{8}
(Australia) M Purcell (Australia) J Thompson | 6 | 6
WC | (Spain) M López (Spain) R Nadal | 4 | 4

Second round
1 | (Germany) K Krawietz (Germany) T Pütz | 6 | 4 | [10]
WC | (Australia) J Duckworth (Australia) C O'Connell | 4 | 6 | [5]
A Karatsev; R Safiullin
7 | (Ecuador) G Escobar (Kazakhstan) A Nedovyesov | w/o
4 | (Australia) R Hijikata (Australia) J Kubler | 4 | 3
(Germany) A Mies (Australia) J-P Smith | 6 | 6
(Australia) M Purcell (Australia) J Thompson | 6 | 6
5 | (Croatia) N Mektić (Monaco) H Nys | 3 | 3

Quarterfinals
1 | (Germany) K Krawietz (Germany) T Pütz | 6 | 7
7 | (Ecuador) G Escobar (Kazakhstan) A Nedovyesov | 3 | 5
(Germany) A Mies (Australia) J-P Smith | 6^{7} | 6^{0}
(Australia) M Purcell (Australia) J Thompson | 7^{9} | 7^{7}

Semifinals
1 | (Germany) K Krawietz (Germany) T Pütz | w/o
(Australia) M Purcell (Australia) J Thompson

=== Bottom half ===
First round
(Netherlands) M Middelkoop (Ukraine) D Molchanov | 4 | 6^{1}
(France) U Humbert (United States) B Shelton | 6 | 7^{7}
(Monaco) R Arneodo (Austria) S Weissborn | 6 | 7
PR | (New Zealand) M Daniell (New Zealand) M Venus | 4 | 5
(India) S Balaji (Romania) VV Cornea | 6 | 5 | [4]
(Bulgaria) G Dimitrov (United States) S Korda | 2 | 7 | [10]
(Colombia) N Barrientos (Brazil) R Matos | 6 | 6
(Germany) D Altmaier (Germany) Y Hanfmann | 2 | 4

Second round
8 | (India) Y Bhambri (Netherlands) R Haase | w/o
(France) U Humbert (United States) B Shelton
(Monaco) R Arneodo (Austria) S Weissborn | 6^{2} | 6^{4}
3 | (United States) N Lammons (United States) J Withrow | 7^{7} | 7^{7}
6 | (Finland) H Heliövaara (Australia) J Peers | 6 | 3 | [3]
(Bulgaria) G Dimitrov (United States) S Korda | 4 | 6 | [10]
(Colombia) N Barrientos (Brazil) R Matos | 2 | 3
2 | (United Kingdom) L Glasspool (Netherlands) J-J Rojer | 6 | 6

Quarterfinals
8 | (India) Y Bhambri (Netherlands) R Haase | 7^{7} | 7^{8}
3 | (United States) N Lammons (United States) J Withrow | 6^{5} | 6^{6}
(Bulgaria) G Dimitrov (United States) S Korda
2 | (United Kingdom) L Glasspool (Netherlands) J-J Rojer | w/o

Semifinals
8 | (India) Y Bhambri (Netherlands) R Haase | 3 | 7^{7} | [9]
2 | (United Kingdom) L Glasspool (Netherlands) J-J Rojer | 6 | 6^{5} | [11]
