= 2024 Brisbane International – Women's doubles =

Women's doubles
- 2024 Brisbane International

Final
- Champions: (Ukraine) Lyudmyla Kichenok (Latvia) Jeļena Ostapenko
- Runners-up: (Belgium) Greet Minnen (United Kingdom) Heather Watson
- Score: 7–5, 6–2

Details
- Draw: 24 (2 WC )
- Seeds: 8

Events
Singles	men	women
Doubles	men	women
- Brisbane International

Lyudmyla Kichenok and Jeļena Ostapenko defeated Greet Minnen and Heather Watson in the final, 7–5, 6–2 to win the women's doubles tennis title at the 2024 Brisbane International.

Hsieh Su-wei and Barbora Strýcová were the reigning champions from 2020, when the event was last held, but Strýcová had since retired from professional tennis. Hsieh partnered Elise Mertens, but lost in the second round to Minnen and Watson. Mertens was in contention to regain the world No. 1 doubles ranking if she had reached the final.

== Seeds ==
All seeds received a bye into the second round.

1. (Chinese Taipei) Hsieh Su-wei / (Belgium) Elise Mertens (second round)
2. (Chinese Taipei) Chan Hao-ching / (Mexico) Giuliana Olmos (second round)
3. (Japan) Miyu Kato / (Indonesia) Aldila Sutjiadi (second round)
4. (Brazil) Ingrid Martins / (Brazil) Luisa Stefani (withdrew)
5. (Ukraine) Lyudmyla Kichenok / (Latvia) Jeļena Ostapenko (champions)
6. Veronika Kudermetova / Liudmila Samsonova (second round)
7. (Hungary) Tímea Babos / (Ukraine) Marta Kostyuk (second round)
8. (Japan) Eri Hozumi / (Japan) Makoto Ninomiya (second round)

== Draw ==
Key

- Q = Qualifier
- WC = Wild card
- LL = Lucky loser
- Alt = Alternate
- ITF = ITF entry
- PR = Protected ranking
- SR = Special ranking
- SE = Special exempt
- JE = Junior exempt
- JR = Junior Accelerator Programme entrant
- CO = College Accelerator Programme entrant
- NG = Next Gen Accelerator Program entrant
- w/o = Walkover
- r = Retired
- d = Defaulted

=== Finals ===
Semifinals
(Belgium) Greet Minnen (United Kingdom) Heather Watson	2	6	[10]
(Spain) Cristina Bucșa; Alexandra Panova	6	4	[8]
5	(Ukraine) Lyudmyla Kichenok (Latvia) Jeļena Ostapenko	w/o
WC	Daria Kasatkina (Australia) Daria Saville

Final
(Belgium) Greet Minnen (United Kingdom) Heather Watson	5	2
5	(Ukraine) Lyudmyla Kichenok (Latvia) Jeļena Ostapenko	7	6

=== Top half ===
First round
(Belgium) G Minnen (United Kingdom) H Watson	6	7^{10}
(United States) C Dolehide (United States) P Stearns	4	6^{8}
(United States) D Collins (Ukraine) N Kichenok	6	6
(Japan) S Aoyama (Serbia) A Krunić	2	4
(United States) S Kenin (United States) A Muhammad	6^{4}	2
(United States) A Krueger (United States) S Stephens	7^{7}	6
(Spain) C Bucșa; A Panova	6	6
(United Kingdom) N Bains (Georgia (country)) O Kalashnikova	2	2

Second round
1	(Chinese Taipei) S-w Hsieh (Belgium) E Mertens	4	2
(Belgium) G Minnen (United Kingdom) H Watson	6	6
(United States) D Collins (Ukraine) N Kichenok	1	6	[10]
6	V Kudermetova; L Samsonova	6	4	[5]
3	(Japan) M Kato (Indonesia) A Sutjiadi	6	4	[9]
(United States) A Krueger (United States) S Stephens	3	6	[11]
(Spain) C Bucșa; A Panova	4	6	[10]
7	(Hungary) T Babos (Ukraine) M Kostyuk	6	4	[5]

Quarterfinals
(Belgium) G Minnen (United Kingdom) H Watson	7^{7}	6
(United States) D Collins (Ukraine) N Kichenok	6^{1}	2
(United States) A Krueger (United States) S Stephens	6^{5}	3
(Spain) C Bucșa; A Panova	7^{7}	6

Semifinals
(Belgium) G Minnen (United Kingdom) H Watson	2	6	[10]
(Spain) C Bucșa; A Panova	6	4	[8]

=== Bottom half ===
First round
E Alexandrova; A Kalinskaya	6	6
(Slovakia) T Mihalíková (China) Y Xu	2	4
(Poland) M Linette (United States) B Pera	6	3	[10]
(Chinese Taipei) F-h Wu (China) L Zhu	3	6	[8]
A Potapova; Y Sizikova	7^{7}	7^{7}
WC	(Australia) T Gibson (Australia) P Hon	6^{2}	6^{2}
WC	D Kasatkina (Australia) D Saville	6	6
L Marozava (Romania) M Niculescu	2	4

Second round
5	(Ukraine) L Kichenok (Latvia) J Ostapenko	5	7	[13]
E Alexandrova; A Kalinskaya	7	5	[11]
(Poland) M Linette (United States) B Pera	6	7
Alt	(Czech Republic) L Nosková; D Shnaider	4	5
8	(Japan) E Hozumi (Japan) M Ninomiya	4	5
A Potapova; Y Sizikova	6	7
WC	D Kasatkina (Australia) D Saville	7^{7}	6^{4}	[11]
2	(Chinese Taipei) H-c Chan (Mexico) G Olmos	6^{5}	7^{7}	[9]

Quarterfinals
5	(Ukraine) L Kichenok (Latvia) J Ostapenko	6	6
(Poland) M Linette (United States) B Pera	4	4
A Potapova; Y Sizikova
WC	D Kasatkina (Australia) D Saville	w/o

Semifinals
5	(Ukraine) L Kichenok (Latvia) J Ostapenko	w/o
WC	D Kasatkina (Australia) D Saville
