= 2024 NRL season results =

The 2024 NRL season was the 117th of professional rugby league in Australia and the 27th season run by the National Rugby League.

All times are listed in AEDT (UTC+11) from Round 1 to games on Saturday of Round 5 including the Grand Final and AEST (UTC+10) from games on Sunday of Round 5 to the Preliminary finals.

Scores with asterisk (*) indicates golden point games.

== Regular season ==
=== Round 1 ===
March 3–10

Home	Score	Away	Match information			
Home	Score	Away	Day & Time	Venue	Referee	Attendance
Manly Warringah Sea Eagles	36–24	South Sydney Rabbitohs	Sunday 3 March, 1:30 pm	Allegiant Stadium	Ashley Klein	40,746
Sydney Roosters	20–10	Brisbane Broncos	Sunday 3 March, 3:30 pm	Allegiant Stadium	Adam Gee	40,746
Newcastle Knights	12–28	Canberra Raiders	Thursday 7 March, 8:00 pm	McDonald Jones Stadium	Todd Smith	22,378
New Zealand Warriors	12–16	Cronulla-Sutherland Sharks	Friday 8 March, 6:00 pm	Go Media Stadium	Peter Gough	24,076
Melbourne Storm	8–0	Penrith Panthers	Friday 8 March, 8:05 pm	AAMI Park	Gerard Sutton	20,169
Parramatta Eels	26–8	Canterbury-Bankstown Bulldogs	Saturday 9 March, 5:30 pm	CommBank Stadium	Grant Atkins	29,171
Gold Coast Titans	4–28	St. George Illawarra Dragons	Saturday 9 March, 7:35 pm	Cbus Super Stadium	Ziggy Przeklasa-Adamski	14,537
Dolphins	18–43	North Queensland Cowboys	Sunday 10 March, 4:05 pm	Suncorp Stadium	Chris Butler	32,477
Bye: Wests Tigers

- For the first time, the NRL season began with a split-round, commencing with a double-header at Allegiant Stadium in Las Vegas, Nevada, with the Manly Warringah Sea Eagles taking on the South Sydney Rabbitohs followed by the Sydney Roosters facing the Brisbane Broncos on 2 March 2024. The NRL announced an attendance of 40,746 for the event, a figure later contradicted by the Las Vegas Stadium Authority whose report confirmed a reduced attendance of 31,927.

=== Round 2 ===
March 14–17

Home	Score	Away	Match information			
Home	Score	Away	Day & Time	Venue	Referee	Attendance
Brisbane Broncos	28–18	South Sydney Rabbitohs	Thursday, 8:00 pm	Suncorp Stadium	Gerard Sutton	35,507
Cronulla-Sutherland Sharks	25–6	Canterbury-Bankstown Bulldogs	Friday, 6:00 pm	PointsBet Stadium	Ziggy Przeklasa-Adamski	12,928
Penrith Panthers	26–18	Parramatta Eels	Friday, 8:05 pm	BlueBet Stadium	Ashley Klein	21,522
Canberra Raiders	32–12	Wests Tigers	Saturday, 3:00 pm	GIO Stadium	Peter Gough	16,968
North Queensland Cowboys	21–20*	Newcastle Knights	Saturday, 5:30 pm	Queensland Country Bank Stadium	Adam Gee	18,986
Melbourne Storm	30–26	New Zealand Warriors	Saturday, 7:35 pm	AAMI Park	Chris Butler	21,927
Manly Warringah Sea Eagles	21–14	Sydney Roosters	Sunday, 4:05 pm	4 Pines Park	Todd Smith	17,284
Dolphins	38–0	St. George Illawarra Dragons	Sunday, 6:15 pm	Kayo Stadium	Grant Atkins	10,011
Bye: Gold Coast Titans

=== Round 3 (Multicultural Round) ===
March 21–24

Home	Score	Away	Match information			
Home	Score	Away	Day & Time	Venue	Referee	Attendance
Penrith Panthers	34–12	Brisbane Broncos	Thursday, 8:00 pm	BlueBet Stadium	Gerard Sutton	20,089
New Zealand Warriors	18–10	Canberra Raiders	Friday, 6:00 pm	Apollo Projects Stadium	Liam Kennedy	17,249
Sydney Roosters	48–6	South Sydney Rabbitohs	Friday, 8:05 pm	Allianz Stadium	Ashley Klein	37,594
Canterbury-Bankstown Bulldogs	32–0	Gold Coast Titans	Saturday, 3:00 pm	Belmore Sports Ground	Todd Smith	12,037
St. George Illawarra Dragons	24–46	North Queensland Cowboys	Saturday, 5:30 pm	Netstrata Jubilee Stadium	Belinda Sharpe	9,252
Wests Tigers	32–6	Cronulla-Sutherland Sharks	Saturday, 7:35 pm	Leichhardt Oval	Chris Butler	15,990
Parramatta Eels	28–24	Manly Warringah Sea Eagles	Sunday, 4:05 pm	CommBank Stadium	Peter Gough	20,354
Newcastle Knights	14–12	Melbourne Storm	Sunday, 6:15 pm	McDonald Jones Stadium	Grant Atkins	21,889
Bye: Dolphins

=== Round 4 (Easter Round) ===
March 28–April 1

Home	Score	Away	Match information			
Home	Score	Away	Day & Time	Venue	Referee	Attendance
Sydney Roosters	16–22	Penrith Panthers	Thursday, 8:00 pm	Allianz Stadium	Adam Gee	25,898
South Sydney Rabbitohs	20–16	Canterbury-Bankstown Bulldogs	Friday, 4:05 pm	Accor Stadium	Gerard Sutton	35,275
Brisbane Broncos	38–12	North Queensland Cowboys	Friday, 8:00 pm	Suncorp Stadium	Grant Atkins	45,793
St. George Illawarra Dragons	20–12	Manly Warringah Sea Eagles	Saturday, 5:30 pm	WIN Stadium	Ashley Klein	16,215
Gold Coast Titans	14–30	Dolphins	Saturday, 7:35 pm	Cbus Super Stadium	Belinda Sharpe	13,898
New Zealand Warriors	20–12	Newcastle Knights	Sunday, 4:05 pm	Go Media Stadium	Peter Gough	24,112
Cronulla-Sutherland Sharks	36–22	Canberra Raiders	Sunday, 6:15 pm	PointsBet Stadium	Todd Smith	12,692
Parramatta Eels	16–17	Wests Tigers	Monday, 4:00 pm	CommBank Stadium	Liam Kennedy	28,608
Bye: Melbourne Storm

=== Round 5 ===
April 4–7

Home	Score	Away	Match information			
Home	Score	Away	Day & Time	Venue	Referee	Attendance
Melbourne Storm	34–32	Brisbane Broncos	Thursday, 7:50 pm	AAMI Park	Ashley Klein	20,968
Canterbury-Bankstown Bulldogs	30–26	Sydney Roosters	Friday, 6:00 pm	Accor Stadium	Grant Atkins	7,169
Newcastle Knights	30–10	St. George Illawarra Dragons	Friday, 8:00 pm	McDonald Jones Stadium	Belinda Sharpe	9,884
South Sydney Rabbitohs	4–34	New Zealand Warriors	Saturday, 3:00 pm	Accor Stadium	Liam Kennedy	13,184
Manly Warringah Sea Eagles	32–18	Penrith Panthers	Saturday, 5:30 pm	4 Pines Park	Todd Smith	17,381
Dolphins	26–16	Wests Tigers	Saturday, 7:35 pm	Suncorp Stadium	Gerard Sutton	22,051
North Queensland Cowboys	35–22	Gold Coast Titans	Sunday, 4:05 pm	Queensland Country Bank Stadium	Chris Butler	18,870
Canberra Raiders	41–8	Parramatta Eels	Sunday, 6:15 pm	GIO Stadium	Adam Gee	13,907
Bye: Cronulla-Sutherland Sharks

=== Round 6 ===
April 11–14

Home	Score	Away	Match information			
Home	Score	Away	Day & Time	Venue	Referee	Attendance
Newcastle Knights	20–22	Sydney Roosters	Thursday, 7:50 pm	McDonald Jones Stadium	Gerard Sutton	21,940
Melbourne Storm	16–14	Canterbury-Bankstown Bulldogs	Friday, 6:00 pm	AAMI Park	Wyatt Raymond	16,065
Brisbane Broncos	28–14	Dolphins	Friday, 8:00 pm	Suncorp Stadium	Adam Gee	46,224
New Zealand Warriors	22–22*	Manly Warringah Sea Eagles	Saturday, 3:00 pm	Go Media Stadium	Chris Butler	23,076
Parramatta Eels	27–20	North Queensland Cowboys	Saturday, 5:30 pm	CommBank Stadium	Peter Gough	14,433
South Sydney Rabbitohs	22–34	Cronulla-Sutherland Sharks	Saturday, 7:35 pm	Accor Stadium	Ashley Klein	12,207
Wests Tigers	12–24	St. George Illawarra Dragons	Sunday, 4:05 pm	Campbelltown Sports Stadium	Grant Atkins	17,141
Canberra Raiders	21–20*	Gold Coast Titans	Sunday, 6:15 pm	GIO Stadium	Kasey Badger	11,738
Bye: Penrith Panthers

=== Round 7 ===
April 18–21

Home	Score	Away	Match information			
Home	Score	Away	Day & Time	Venue	Referee	Attendance
Sydney Roosters	12–18	Melbourne Storm	Thursday, 7:50 pm	Allianz Stadium	Ashley Klein	17,714
St. George Illawarra Dragons	30–12	New Zealand Warriors	Friday, 6:00 pm	WIN Stadium	Gerard Sutton	13,111
Parramatta Eels	16–44	Dolphins	Friday, 8:00 pm	TIO Stadium	Todd Smith	11,094
Penrith Panthers	22–6	Wests Tigers	Saturday, 3:00 pm	Carrington Park	Wyatt Raymond	12,000
Gold Coast Titans	30–34	Manly Warringah Sea Eagles	Saturday, 5:30 pm	Cbus Super Stadium	Liam Kennedy	13,336
Brisbane Broncos	34–10	Canberra Raiders	Saturday, 7:35 pm	Suncorp Stadium	Chris Butler	37,286
Canterbury-Bankstown Bulldogs	36–12	Newcastle Knights	Sunday, 2:00 pm	Accor Stadium	Peter Gough	17,784
Cronulla-Sutherland Sharks	42–6	North Queensland Cowboys	Sunday, 4:05 pm	PointsBet Stadium	Adam Gee	12,415
Bye: South Sydney Rabbitohs

=== Round 8 (ANZAC Round) ===
April 25–28

Home	Score	Away	Match information			
Home	Score	Away	Day & Time	Venue	Referee	Attendance
New Zealand Warriors	24–27	Gold Coast Titans	Thursday, 2:00 pm	Go Media Stadium	Wyatt Raymond	23,912
St. George Illawarra Dragons	18–60	Sydney Roosters	Thursday, 4:00 pm	Allianz Stadium	Adam Gee	40,727
Melbourne Storm	54–20	South Sydney Rabbitohs	Thursday, 7:50 pm	AAMI Park	Todd Smith	25,149
Manly Warringah Sea Eagles	32–18	Parramatta Eels	Friday, 8:00 pm	4 Pines Park	Gerard Sutton	17,385
Wests Tigers	10–34	Brisbane Broncos	Saturday, 5:30 pm	Campbelltown Sports Stadium	Grant Atkins	17,351
North Queensland Cowboys	20–26	Penrith Panthers	Saturday, 7:35 pm	Queensland Country Bank Stadium	Kasey Badger	20,960
Dolphins	14–18	Newcastle Knights	Sunday, 2:00 pm	Suncorp Stadium	Liam Kennedy	18,033
Canberra Raiders	0–40	Cronulla-Sutherland Sharks	Sunday, 4:05 pm	GIO Stadium	Peter Gough	15,820
Bye: Canterbury-Bankstown Bulldogs

- The Wests Tigers recorded their biggest home crowd at Campbelltown since round 16, 2011

=== Round 9 ===
May 2–5

Home	Score	Away	Match information			
Home	Score	Away	Day & Time	Venue	Referee	Attendance
South Sydney Rabbitohs	12–42	Penrith Panthers	Thursday, 7:50 pm	Accor Stadium	Adam Gee	8,155
Manly Warringah Sea Eagles	24–26	Canberra Raiders	Friday, 6:00 pm	4 Pines Park	Grant Atkins	10,215
Brisbane Broncos	18–40	Sydney Roosters	Friday, 8:00 pm	Suncorp Stadium	Ashley Klein	40,190
Canterbury-Bankstown Bulldogs	22–14	Wests Tigers	Saturday, 3:00 pm	Accor Stadium	Gerard Sutton	17,068
Gold Coast Titans	20–22	Melbourne Storm	Saturday, 5:30 pm	Cbus Super Stadium	Belinda Sharpe	13,096
North Queensland Cowboys	26–28	Dolphins	Saturday, 7:35 pm	Queensland Country Bank Stadium	Peter Gough	20,967
Newcastle Knights	14–8	New Zealand Warriors	Sunday, 2:00 pm	McDonald Jones Stadium	Chris Butler	16,094
Cronulla-Sutherland Sharks	20–10	St. George Illawarra Dragons	Sunday, 4:05 pm	PointsBet Stadium	Todd Smith	9,731
Bye: Parramatta Eels

=== Round 10 ===
May 9–12

Home	Score	Away	Match information			
Home	Score	Away	Day & Time	Venue	Referee	Attendance
Dolphins	30–24	Manly Warringah Sea Eagles	Thursday, 7:50 pm	Suncorp Stadium	Ashley Klein	14,059
Penrith Panthers	16–10	Canterbury-Bankstown Bulldogs	Friday, 6:00 pm	BlueBet Stadium	Liam Kennedy	21,525
Parramatta Eels	14–30	Brisbane Broncos	Friday, 8:00 pm	CommBank Stadium	Gerard Sutton	17,393
Wests Tigers	14–20	Newcastle Knights	Saturday, 3:00 pm	Scully Park	Ziggy Przeklasa-Adamski	10,107
St. George Illawarra Dragons	28–14	South Sydney Rabbitohs	Saturday, 5:30 pm	Netstrata Jubilee Stadium	Belinda Sharpe	7,517
Melbourne Storm	18–25	Cronulla-Sutherland Sharks	Saturday, 7:35 pm	AAMI Park	Grant Atkins	18,670
Sydney Roosters	38–18	New Zealand Warriors	Sunday, 2:00 pm	Allianz Stadium	Kasey Badger	16,517
Gold Coast Titans	20–18	North Queensland Cowboys	Sunday, 4:05 pm	Cbus Super Stadium	Wyatt Raymond	12,125
Bye: Canberra Raiders

=== Round 11 (Magic Round) ===
May 17–19

Home	Score	Away	Match information			
Home	Score	Away	Day & Time	Venue	Referee	Attendance
Canberra Raiders	24–20	Canterbury-Bankstown Bulldogs	Friday, 6:00 pm	Suncorp Stadium	Ashley Klein	50,971
Manly Warringah Sea Eagles	12–13	Brisbane Broncos	Friday, 8:05 pm	Suncorp Stadium	Todd Smith	50,971
Gold Coast Titans	24–28	Newcastle Knights	Saturday, 3:00 pm	Suncorp Stadium	Gerard Sutton	50,708
Cronulla-Sutherland Sharks	38–30	Sydney Roosters	Saturday, 5:30 pm	Suncorp Stadium	Adam Gee	50,708
South Sydney Rabbitohs	22–28	North Queensland Cowboys	Saturday, 7:45 pm	Suncorp Stadium	Peter Gough	50,708
New Zealand Warriors	22–20	Penrith Panthers	Sunday, 1:50 pm	Suncorp Stadium	Grant Atkins	47,517
Melbourne Storm	48–16	Parramatta Eels	Sunday, 4:05 pm	Suncorp Stadium	Wyatt Raymond	47,517
Wests Tigers	12–24	Dolphins	Sunday, 6:25 pm	Suncorp Stadium	Chris Butler	47,517
Bye: St. George Illawarra Dragons

=== Round 12 (Indigenous Round) ===
May 23–26

Home	Score	Away	Match information			
Home	Score	Away	Day & Time	Venue	Referee	Attendance
Canterbury-Bankstown Bulldogs	44–12	St. George Illawarra Dragons	Thursday, 7:50 pm	Accor Stadium	Adam Gee	15,442
North Queensland Cowboys	42–28	Wests Tigers	Friday, 6:00 pm	Queensland Country Bank Stadium	Belinda Sharpe	15,957
Manly Warringah Sea Eagles	26–20	Melbourne Storm	Friday, 8:00 pm	4 Pines Park	Ashley Klein	17,211
Canberra Raiders	16–44	Sydney Roosters	Saturday, 3:00 pm	GIO Stadium	Todd Smith	18,049
Cronulla-Sutherland Sharks	0–42	Penrith Panthers	Saturday, 5:30 pm	PointsBet Stadium	Gerard Sutton	13,500
South Sydney Rabbitohs	42–26	Parramatta Eels	Saturday, 7:35 pm	Accor Stadium	Chris Butler	15,202
Brisbane Broncos	34–36	Gold Coast Titans	Sunday, 2:00 pm	Suncorp Stadium	Peter Gough	42,221
New Zealand Warriors	24–20	Dolphins	Sunday, 4:05 pm	Go Media Stadium	Liam Kennedy	23,116
Bye: Newcastle Knights

=== Round 13 ===
May 30–June 2

Home	Score	Away	Match information			
Home	Score	Away	Day & Time	Venue	Referee	Attendance
Parramatta Eels	34–22	Cronulla-Sutherland Sharks	Thursday, 7:50 pm	CommBank Stadium	Ashley Klein	11,665
Newcastle Knights	2–32	Canterbury-Bankstown Bulldogs	Friday, 8:00 pm	McDonald Jones Stadium	Grant Atkins	21,204
Penrith Panthers	10–22	St. George Illawarra Dragons	Saturday, 5:30 pm	BlueBet Stadium	Todd Smith	12,025
Dolphins	25–26*	Canberra Raiders	Saturday, 7:35 pm	Kayo Stadium	Adam Gee	10,024
Sydney Roosters	16–18	North Queensland Cowboys	Sunday, 4:05 pm	Allianz Stadium	Gerard Sutton	13,811
Bye: Brisbane Broncos, Gold Coast Titans, Manly Warringah Sea Eagles, Melbourne Storm, New Zealand Warriors, South Sydney Rabbitohs, Wests Tigers

=== Round 14 ===
June 7–10

Home	Score	Away	Match information			
Home	Score	Away	Day & Time	Venue	Referee	Attendance
St. George Illawarra Dragons	56–14	Wests Tigers	Friday, 8:00 pm	WIN Stadium	Chris Butler	9,969
Gold Coast Titans	12–46	South Sydney Rabbitohs	Saturday, 3:00 pm	Cbus Super Stadium	Chris Sutton	14,434
North Queensland Cowboys	12–42	New Zealand Warriors	Saturday, 5:30 pm	Queensland Country Bank Stadium	Ziggy Przeklasa-Adamski	19,623
Brisbane Broncos	12–22	Cronulla-Sutherland Sharks	Saturday, 7:35 pm	Suncorp Stadium	Grant Atkins	41,004
Melbourne Storm	36–28	Newcastle Knights	Sunday, 2:00 pm	AAMI Park	Adam Gee	20,269
Penrith Panthers	32–22	Manly Warringah Sea Eagles	Sunday, 4:05 pm	BlueBet Stadium	Gerard Sutton	20,101
Canterbury-Bankstown Bulldogs	22–18	Parramatta Eels	Monday, 4:00 pm	Accor Stadium	Peter Gough	45,496
Bye: Canberra Raiders, Dolphins, Sydney Roosters

=== Round 15 (Beanie for Brain Cancer Round) ===
June 13–16

Home	Score	Away	Match information			
Home	Score	Away	Day & Time	Venue	Referee	Attendance
Cronulla-Sutherland Sharks	28–30	Dolphins	Thursday, 7:50 pm	PointsBet Stadium	Todd Smith	8,035
Canberra Raiders	16–34	North Queensland Cowboys	Friday, 6:00 pm	GIO Stadium	Chris Sutton	9,671
South Sydney Rabbitohs	22–12	Brisbane Broncos	Friday, 8:00 pm	Accor Stadium	Adam Gee	12,207
Wests Tigers	18–10	Gold Coast Titans	Saturday, 3:00 pm	Leichhardt Oval	Ashley Klein	8,147
New Zealand Warriors	24–38	Melbourne Storm	Saturday, 5:30 pm	Go Media Stadium	Gerard Sutton	24,495
Parramatta Eels	18–28	Sydney Roosters	Saturday, 7:35 pm	CommBank Stadium	Chris Butler	20,072
Manly Warringah Sea Eagles	30–14	St. George Illawarra Dragons	Sunday, 2:00 pm	4 Pines Park	Peter Gough	17,187
Newcastle Knights	18–26	Penrith Panthers	Sunday, 4:05 pm	McDonald Jones Stadium	Grant Atkins	27,966
Bye: Canterbury-Bankstown Bulldogs

=== Round 16 ===
June 21–23

Home	Score	Away	Match information			
Home	Score	Away	Day & Time	Venue	Referee	Attendance
Dolphins	24–30	Melbourne Storm	Friday, 8:00 pm	Suncorp Stadium	Liam Kennedy	25,167
Gold Coast Titans	66–6	New Zealand Warriors	Saturday, 3:00 pm	Cbus Super Stadium	Adam Gee	22,702
Sydney Roosters	26–8	Canterbury-Bankstown Bulldogs	Saturday, 5:30 pm	Industree Group Stadium	Grant Atkins	16,868
South Sydney Rabbitohs	14–0	Manly Warringah Sea Eagles	Saturday, 7:35 pm	Accor Stadium	Chris Butler	10,076
Wests Tigers	48–24	Canberra Raiders	Sunday, 4:05 pm	Campbelltown Sports Stadium	Todd Smith	10,106
Bye: Brisbane Broncos, Cronulla-Sutherland Sharks, Newcastle Knights, North Queensland Cowboys, Parramatta Eels, Penrith Panthers, St. George Illawarra Dragons

- Gold Coast recorded the biggest ever win and highest ever score by a Gold Coast side as well as the highest ever score at Cbus Super Stadium.
- New Zealand recorded their equal biggest ever loss.
- Wests Tigers ended a 10-game losing streak at Campbelltown Sports Stadium.

=== Round 17 ===
June 28–30

Home	Score	Away	Match information			
Home	Score	Away	Day & Time	Venue	Referee	Attendance
Canterbury-Bankstown Bulldogs	15–14*	Cronulla-Sutherland Sharks	Friday, 8:00 pm	Accor Stadium	Gerard Sutton	15,765
New Zealand Warriors	32–16	Brisbane Broncos	Saturday, 3:00 pm	Go Media Stadium	Todd Smith	22,711
Newcastle Knights	34–26	Parramatta Eels	Saturday, 5:30 pm	McDonald Jones Stadium	Peter Gough	27,424
Melbourne Storm	16–6	Canberra Raiders	Saturday, 7:35 pm	AAMI Park	Grant Atkins	14,127
St. George Illawarra Dragons	26–6	Dolphins	Sunday, 2:00 pm	Netstrata Jubilee Stadium	Adam Gee	8,052
Penrith Panthers	6–16	North Queensland Cowboys	Sunday, 4:05 pm	BlueBet Stadium	Liam Kennedy	15,777
Sydney Roosters	40–6	Wests Tigers	Sunday, 6:15 pm	Allianz Stadium	Ziggy Przeklasa-Adamski	14,711
Bye: Gold Coast Titans, Manly Warringah Sea Eagles, South Sydney Rabbitohs

=== Round 18 ===
July 4–7

Home	Score	Away	Match information			
Home	Score	Away	Day & Time	Venue	Referee	Attendance
Parramatta Eels	16–32	South Sydney Rabbitohs	Thursday, 7:50 pm	CommBank Stadium	Liam Kennedy	13,941
Cronulla-Sutherland Sharks	16–20	Gold Coast Titans	Friday, 6:00 pm	C.ex Coffs International Stadium	Ziggy Przeklasa-Adamski	8,673
Brisbane Broncos	6–14	Penrith Panthers	Friday, 8:00 pm	Suncorp Stadium	Grant Atkins	42,433
Canterbury-Bankstown Bulldogs	13–12*	New Zealand Warriors	Saturday, 3:00 pm	Accor Stadium	Chris Butler	27,223
Wests Tigers	28–40	Melbourne Storm	Saturday, 5:30pm	Leichhardt Oval	Peter Gough	10,311
North Queensland Cowboys	20–21*	Manly Warringah Sea Eagles	Saturday, 7:35 pm	Queensland Country Bank Stadium	Todd Smith	18,787
Sydney Roosters	42–12	St. George Illawarra Dragons	Sunday, 2:00 pm	Allianz Stadium	Ashley Klein	23,388
Canberra Raiders	12–16	Newcastle Knights	Sunday, 4:05 pm	GIO Stadium	Gerard Sutton	12,553
Bye: Dolphins

=== Round 19 ===
July 11–14

Home	Score	Away	Match information			
Home	Score	Away	Day & Time	Venue	Referee	Attendance
Dolphins	36–28	South Sydney Rabbitohs	Thursday, 7:50 pm	Kayo Stadium	Gerard Sutton	10,023
Cronulla-Sutherland Sharks	58–6	Wests Tigers	Friday, 8:00 pm	PointsBet Stadium	Adam Gee	10,912
Gold Coast Titans	24–16	Parramatta Eels	Saturday, 5:30 pm	Cbus Super Stadium	Todd Smith	16,670
Brisbane Broncos	26–30	St. George Illawarra Dragons	Saturday, 7:35 pm	Suncorp Stadium	Liam Kennedy	34,224
Manly Warringah Sea Eagles	44–6	Newcastle Knights	Sunday, 4:05 pm	4 Pines Park	Grant Atkins	17,298
Bye: Canberra Raiders, Canterbury-Bankstown Bulldogs, Melbourne Storm, New Zealand Warriors, North Queensland Cowboys, Penrith Panthers, Sydney Roosters

=== Round 20 ===
July 19–21

Home	Score	Away	Match information			
Home	Score	Away	Day & Time	Venue	Referee	Attendance
Canberra Raiders	20–18	New Zealand Warriors	Friday, 8:00 pm	GIO Stadium	Todd Smith	8,509
South Sydney Rabbitohs	42–28	Wests Tigers	Saturday, 3:00 pm	Industree Group Stadium	Wyatt Raymond	16,284
Newcastle Knights	14–30	Brisbane Broncos	Saturday, 5:30 pm	McDonald Jones Stadium	Chris Butler	26,952
Melbourne Storm	24–8	Sydney Roosters	Saturday, 7:35 pm	AAMI Park	Grant Atkins	17,055
Penrith Panthers	28–26	Dolphins	Sunday, 2:00 pm	BlueBet Stadium	Adam Gee	20,955
Manly Warringah Sea Eagles	38–8	Gold Coast Titans	Sunday, 4:05 pm	4 Pines Park	Liam Kennedy	16,050
North Queensland Cowboys	20–18	Canterbury-Bankstown Bulldogs	Sunday, 6:15 pm	Queensland Country Bank Stadium	Gerard Sutton	16,376
Bye: Cronulla-Sutherland Sharks, Parramatta Eels, St. George Illawarra Dragons

=== Round 21 ===
July 26–28

Home	Score	Away	Match information			
Home	Score	Away	Day & Time	Venue	Referee	Attendance
New Zealand Warriors	28–16	Wests Tigers	Friday, 6:00 pm	Go Media Stadium	Peter Gough	23,976
Parramatta Eels	14–32	Melbourne Storm	Friday, 8:00 pm	CommBank Stadium	Liam Kennedy	11,082
Brisbane Broncos	16–41	Canterbury-Bankstown Bulldogs	Saturday, 3:00 pm	Suncorp Stadium	Grant Atkins	42,213
North Queensland Cowboys	30–22	Cronulla-Sutherland Sharks	Saturday, 5:30 pm	Queensland Country Bank Stadium	Adam Gee	17,907
Sydney Roosters	34–30	Manly Warringah Sea Eagles	Saturday, 7:35 pm	Allianz Stadium	Ashley Klein	25,155
St. George Illawarra Dragons	10–46	Penrith Panthers	Sunday, 2:00 pm	WIN Stadium	Gerard Sutton	18,988
Dolphins	14–21	Gold Coast Titans	Sunday, 4:05 pm	Suncorp Stadium	Todd Smith	19,533
Canberra Raiders	32–12	South Sydney Rabbitohs	Sunday, 6:15 pm	GIO Stadium	Wyatt Raymond	12,114
Bye: Newcastle Knights

- Canterbury ended a 13-game losing streak at Suncorp Stadium

=== Round 22 (Women in League Round) ===
August 1–4

Home	Score	Away	Match information			
Home	Score	Away	Day & Time	Venue	Referee	Attendance
Wests Tigers	30–48	North Queensland Cowboys	Thursday, 7:50 pm	Leichhardt Oval	Chris Butler	7,231
New Zealand Warriors	20–30	Parramatta Eels	Friday, 6:00 pm	Go Media Stadium	Todd Smith	23,812
Dolphins	34–40	Sydney Roosters	Friday, 8:00 pm	HBF Park	Gerard Sutton	20,027
Gold Coast Titans	46–18	Brisbane Broncos	Saturday, 3:00 pm	Cbus Super Stadium	Peter Gough	25,278
Melbourne Storm	16–18	St. George Illawarra Dragons	Saturday, 5:30 pm	AAMI Park	Grant Atkins	18,103
Cronulla-Sutherland Sharks	20–6	South Sydney Rabbitohs	Saturday, 7:35 pm	PointsBet Stadium	Liam Kennedy	12,763
Penrith Panthers	22–14	Newcastle Knights	Sunday, 2:00 pm	BlueBet Stadium	Adam Gee	20,261
Canterbury-Bankstown Bulldogs	22–18	Canberra Raiders	Sunday, 4:05 pm	Belmore Sports Ground	Ashley Klein	18,110
Bye: Manly Warringah Sea Eagles

- St George Illawarra won their first game in Melbourne since the 1999 Qualifying Final.

=== Round 23 ===
August 8–11

Home	Score	Away	Match information			
Home	Score	Away	Day & Time	Venue	Referee	Attendance
South Sydney Rabbitohs	16–28	Melbourne Storm	Thursday, 7:50 pm	Accor Stadium	Todd Smith	8,973
Gold Coast Titans	0–44	Cronulla-Sutherland Sharks	Friday, 6:00 pm	Cbus Super Stadium	Adam Gee	13,287
Parramatta Eels	34–36	Penrith Panthers	Friday, 8:00 pm	CommBank Stadium	Peter Gough	18,852
Canberra Raiders	24–46	Manly Warringah Sea Eagles	Saturday, 3:00 pm	GIO Stadium	Grant Atkins	16,690
North Queensland Cowboys	18–42	Brisbane Broncos	Saturday, 5:30 pm	Queensland Country Bank Stadium	Ashley Klein	24,230
St. George Illawarra Dragons	10–28	Canterbury-Bankstown Bulldogs	Saturday, 7:35 pm	Netstrata Jubilee Stadium	Gerard Sutton	18,416
Dolphins	34–32*	New Zealand Warriors	Sunday, 2:00 pm	Suncorp Stadium	Wyatt Raymond	28,056
Newcastle Knights	34–18	Wests Tigers	Sunday, 4:05 pm	McDonald Jones Stadium	Belinda Sharpe	22,183
Bye: Sydney Roosters

=== Round 24 ===
August 15–18

Home	Score	Away	Match information			
Home	Score	Away	Day & Time	Venue	Referee	Attendance
Penrith Panthers	22–24	Melbourne Storm	Thursday, 7:50 pm	BlueBet Stadium	Ashley Klein	20,516
Manly Warringah Sea Eagles	24–10	New Zealand Warriors	Friday, 6:00 pm	4 Pines Park	Chris Butler	17,333
Sydney Roosters	38–14	Parramatta Eels	Friday, 8:00 pm	Allianz Stadium	Grant Atkins	20,724
Canterbury-Bankstown Bulldogs	30–10	Dolphins	Saturday, 3:00 pm	Salter Oval	Adam Gee	6,146
North Queensland Cowboys	42–4	Canberra Raiders	Saturday, 5:30 pm	Queensland Country Bank Stadium	Todd Smith	17,920
Wests Tigers	18–16	South Sydney Rabbitohs	Saturday, 7:35 pm	Campbelltown Sports Stadium	Belinda Sharpe	11,420
St. George Illawarra Dragons	32–16	Gold Coast Titans	Sunday, 2:00 pm	WIN Stadium	Wyatt Raymond	9,240
Cronulla-Sutherland Sharks	19–18*	Newcastle Knights	Sunday, 4:05 pm	PointsBet Stadium	Gerard Sutton	11,503
Bye: Brisbane Broncos

=== Round 25 ===
August 22–25

Home	Score	Away	Match information			
Home	Score	Away	Day & Time	Venue	Referee	Attendance
Wests Tigers	34–26	Manly Warringah Sea Eagles	Thursday, 7:50 pm	Leichhardt Oval	Peter Gough	11,520
New Zealand Warriors	18–34	Canterbury-Bankstown Bulldogs	Friday, 6:00 pm	Shaun Johnson Stadium	Wyatt Raymond	24,295
Brisbane Broncos	30–24	Parramatta Eels	Friday, 8:00 pm	Suncorp Stadium	Todd Smith	36,289
Canberra Raiders	22–18	Penrith Panthers	Saturday, 3:00 pm	GIO Stadium	Grant Atkins	17,523
Melbourne Storm	48–6	Dolphins	Saturday, 5:30 pm	AAMI Park	Gerard Sutton	26,106
South Sydney Rabbitohs	16–36	Newcastle Knights	Saturday, 7:35 pm	Accor Stadium	Chris Butler	9,659
Gold Coast Titans	22–48	Sydney Roosters	Sunday, 2:00 pm	Cbus Super Stadium	Adam Gee	19,286
St. George Illawarra Dragons	10–38	Cronulla-Sutherland Sharks	Sunday, 4:05 pm	WIN Stadium	Ashley Klein	17,754
Bye: North Queensland Cowboys

- Melbourne Storm claimed the Minor Premiership with their win over the Dolphins and Penrith's loss to the Raiders.

=== Round 26 ===
August 29–September 1

Home	Score	Away	Match information			
Home	Score	Away	Day & Time	Venue	Referee	Attendance
North Queensland Cowboys	38–30	Melbourne Storm	Thursday, 7:50 pm	Queensland Country Bank Stadium	Grant Atkins	20,787
Canterbury-Bankstown Bulldogs	22–34	Manly Warringah Sea Eagles	Friday, 6:00 pm	Accor Stadium	Ashley Klein	35,502
Penrith Panthers	34–12	South Sydney Rabbitohs	Friday, 8:00 pm	BlueBet Stadium	Peter Gough	20,176
Parramatta Eels	44–40	St. George Illawarra Dragons	Saturday, 3:00 pm	CommBank Stadium	Wyatt Raymond	21,623
Dolphins	40–6	Brisbane Broncos	Saturday, 5:30 pm	Suncorp Stadium	Adam Gee	50,049
Cronulla-Sutherland Sharks	28–30	New Zealand Warriors	Saturday, 7:35 pm	PointsBet Stadium	Chris Butler	12,637
Newcastle Knights	36–14	Gold Coast Titans	Sunday, 2:00 pm	McDonald Jones Stadium	Gerard Sutton	24,712
Sydney Roosters	12–14	Canberra Raiders	Sunday, 4:05 pm	Allianz Stadium	Todd Smith	27,239
Bye: Wests Tigers

- The Parramatta v St George Illawarra game was the first time in competition history that both sides scored 40 points

=== Round 27 ===
September 5–8

Home	Score	Away	Match information			
Home	Score	Away	Day & Time	Venue	Referee	Attendance
Brisbane Broncos	12–50	Melbourne Storm	Thursday, 7:50 pm	Suncorp Stadium	Todd Smith	35,086
Wests Tigers	26–60	Parramatta Eels	Friday, 6:00 pm	Campbelltown Sports Stadium	Peter Gough	17,311
South Sydney Rabbitohs	28–36	Sydney Roosters	Friday, 8:00 pm	Accor Stadium	Grant Atkins	19,674
St. George Illawarra Dragons	24–26	Canberra Raiders	Saturday, 3:00 pm	Netstrata Jubilee Stadium	Wyatt Raymond	11,189
Canterbury-Bankstown Bulldogs	6–44	North Queensland Cowboys	Saturday, 5:30 pm	Accor Stadium	Gerard Sutton	32,437
Penrith Panthers	18–12	Gold Coast Titans	Saturday, 7:35 pm	Penrith Park	Chris Butler	21,525
Manly Warringah Sea Eagles	20–40	Cronulla-Sutherland Sharks	Sunday, 2:00 pm	4 Pines Park	Adam Gee	17,384
Newcastle Knights	14–6	Dolphins	Sunday, 4:05 pm	McDonald Jones Stadium	Ashley Klein	29,433
Bye: New Zealand Warriors

- Parramatta scored 60 points in a match for the first time since round 25, 2007

== Finals series ==
Home	Score	Away	Match Information
Home	Score	Away	Date	Venue	Referee	Crowd
QUALIFYING & ELIMINATION FINALS
Penrith Panthers	30–10	Sydney Roosters	13 September 2024	BlueBet Stadium	Ashley Klein	21,483
Melbourne Storm	37–10	Cronulla-Sutherland Sharks	14 September 2024	AAMI Park	Gerard Sutton	26,326
North Queensland Cowboys	28–16	Newcastle Knights	14 September 2024	Queensland Country Bank Stadium	Todd Smith	24,861
Canterbury-Bankstown Bulldogs	22–24	Manly Warringah Sea Eagles	15 September 2024	Accor Stadium	Grant Atkins	50,714
SEMI-FINALS
Cronulla-Sutherland Sharks	26–18	North Queensland Cowboys	20 September 2024	Allianz Stadium	Ashley Klein	19,124
Sydney Roosters	40–16	Manly Warringah Sea Eagles	21 September 2024	Allianz Stadium	Grant Atkins	40,818
PRELIMINARY FINALS
Melbourne Storm	48–18	Sydney Roosters	27 September 2024	AAMI Park	Grant Atkins	29,213
Penrith Panthers	26–6	Cronulla-Sutherland Sharks	28 September 2024	Accor Stadium	Ashley Klein	33,753
GRAND FINAL
Melbourne Storm	6–14	Penrith Panthers	6 October 2024	Accor Stadium	Ashley Klein	80,156

- With their loss to Penrith, the Roosters lost ten games in a row against an opponent for the first time in club history.
- Penrith Park (commercially known as BlueBet Stadium) hosted its last NRL match before its redevelopment
- Penrith became the first side to win eleven finals a row and the first side to make five Grand Finals in a row since South Sydney in 1971
- Penrith became the first side since St George in 1959 to win four premierships in a row

=== Bracket ===
Qualifying and elimination finals
14 September – Melbourne
1	Melbourne Storm	37
4	Cronulla-Sutherland	10
14 September – Townsville
5	North Queensland	28
8	Newcastle Knights	16
15 September – Sydney
6	Canterbury-Bankstown	22
7	Manly Warringah	24
13 September – Sydney
2	Penrith Panthers	30
3	Sydney Roosters	10

Semi-finals
20 September – Sydney
Cronulla-Sutherland	26
North Queensland	18
21 September – Sydney
Sydney Roosters	40
Manly Warringah	16

Preliminary finals
27 September – Melbourne
Melbourne Storm	48
Sydney Roosters	18
28 September – Sydney
Penrith Panthers	26
Cronulla-Sutherland	6

Grand final
6 October – Sydney
Melbourne Storm	6
Penrith Panthers	14

== Stadiums used ==
Stadium	Games played	Teams / Events
4 Pines Park	10	Manly Warringah Sea Eagles
AAMI Park	13	Melbourne Storm
Accor Stadium	23	Canterbury-Bankstown Bulldogs, Penrith Panthers (Note: Finals venue only.), South Sydney Rabbitohs, Grand Final
Allegiant Stadium	2	Manly Warringah Sea Eagles, Sydney Roosters
Allianz Stadium	13	Cronulla-Sutherland Sharks (Note: Finals venue only.), St. George Illawarra Dragons, Sydney Roosters
Apollo Projects Stadium	1	New Zealand Warriors
Belmore Sports Ground	2	Canterbury-Bankstown Bulldogs
BlueBet Stadium	12	Penrith Panthers
Campbelltown Sports Stadium	5	Wests Tigers
Carrington Park	1	Penrith Panthers
Cbus Super Stadium	11	Gold Coast Titans
C.ex Coffs International Stadium	1	Cronulla-Sutherland Sharks
CommBank Stadium	11	Parramatta Eels
GIO Stadium	11	Canberra Raiders
Go Media Stadium	10	New Zealand Warriors
HBF Park	1	Dolphins
Kayo Stadium	3	Dolphins
Leichhardt Oval	5	Wests Tigers
McDonald Jones Stadium	12	Newcastle Knights
Netstrata Jubilee Stadium	5	St. George Illawarra Dragons
PointsBet Stadium	10	Cronulla-Sutherland Sharks
Queensland Country Bank Stadium	13	North Queensland Cowboys
Salter Oval	1	Canterbury-Bankstown Bulldogs
Scully Park	1	Wests Tigers
Suncorp Stadium	28	Brisbane Broncos, Dolphins, Magic Round
TIO Stadium	1	Parramatta Eels
WIN Stadium	6	St. George Illawarra Dragons
