= Southern 80 =

Australian water-ski race

Event information
- Type: Water Ski race
- Race area: Murray River, Torrumbarry to Echuca
- Dates: Second Sunday in February, annually
- Host city: Echuca, Victoria
- Distance: 80 km (50 miles)
- First race: 1965
- Former names: Echuca Ski Cup; Southern 50
- Website: https://www.southern80.com.au/

Results
- Winner (2020): Superman (31:06.09)

The Southern 80 is an annual water-ski race held on the Murray River in Australia, finishing at the Victorian/NSW border towns of Echuca and Moama. The race, usually held on the second weekend in February, currently attracts around 900 competitors and 260 boats, as well as tens of thousands of spectators. Teams of four (a boat driver, an observer and two skiers) make up the vast bulk of entries over the 39 different classes, with racing on Saturday held over a 20 km course, starting at the Five Mile boat ramp and finishing at Victoria Park in Echuca, while Sunday's racing is held over the full 80 km course, starting from Torrumbarry Weir and finishing at Victoria Park. Classes cater for different engine capacities of both inboards and outboards, as well as a range of age classes (under 10s, under 13s, under 16s, under 19s). There is also a women's and disabled class, and series of Social classes for skiers who use waterskis with the same dimensions and bindings as regular slalom skis, rather than the long "rail" waterskis used by Expert class skiers

Due to the 120-plus bends in the course, and the narrow width of the Murray River around Echuca-Moama, the race is considered to be a tough challenge for competitors, while also providing spectators on the river bank close views of the action. However, due to the short straights, boats are unable to sustain high speeds, although the top Super Class competitors are capable of hitting speeds of up 200 km/h on the longer straights

== History ==
The first two-up water-ski race to be held on the Murray River took place 30 & 31 October 1965, when nine boats competed in the Echuca Ski Cup, which was held over a 100-mile (161 km) course, which took competitors from Echuca to Torrumbarry and back again. The winner of the Echuca Ski Cup was Turbofire, an inboard owned by P Reison of Harboard, NSW. Between 1967 and 1974, the Victorian Water Ski Association began running the Southern 50 race over a 50-mile (80 km) course, starting at the Victoria Park boat ramp in Echuca and finishing at the Torrumbarry Weir boat ramp, with teams of two skiers, a driver and an observer competing. In 1972, the direction of racing changed, with competitors now starting at Torrumbarry Weir boat ramp and finishing at Victoria Park boat ramp. By this stage there were 10 different classes.

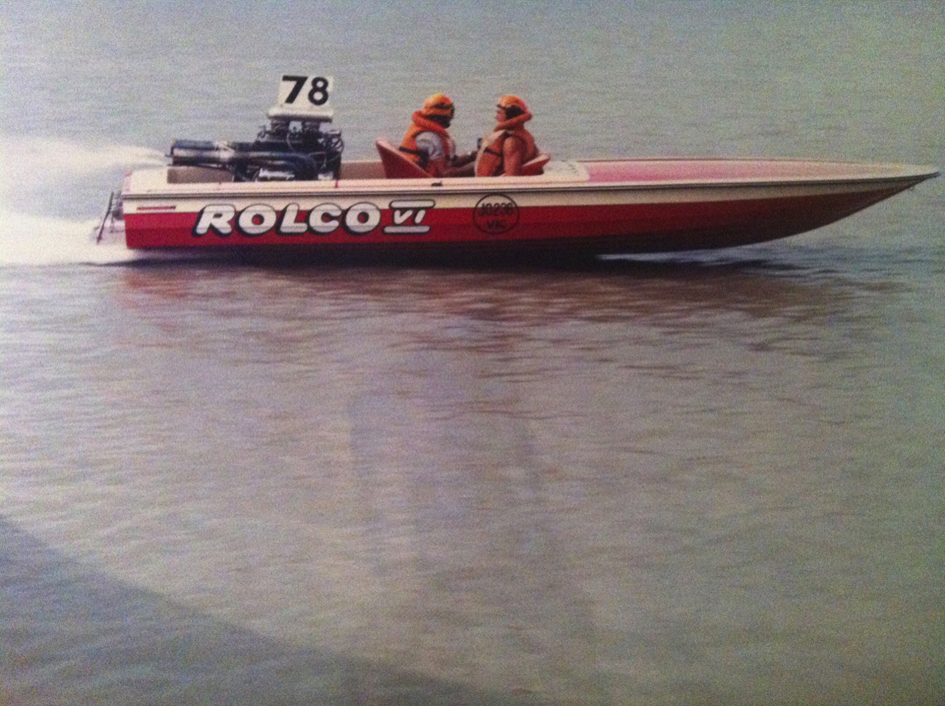
Rolco VI, winner of the 1984 and 1988 Southern 80

In 1974, the newly formed Moama Water Sports Club took over running of the race, and the following year it was renamed the Southern 80 (in recognition of Australia's switch from imperial to metric measures) and held in February rather than May. During the 1970s, driver Lenny Retallick enjoyed multiple outright victories with his wooden Suicide boats, claiming his first overall success in 1975, then backing it up with wins in 1977 and 1978

During the early 1980s the race started to attract more than 100 entries, as well as large numbers of spectators. The dominant driver of the decade was Ted Hurley, who recorded three outright victories - first in 1982 with Rolco IV, then in 1984 with Rolco VI, and again in 1987 with Recovery. Rolco VI, which Hurley sold to Murray Price, was also victorious in the 1986 and 1988 Southern 80s, racing as Rolco.

Island Cooler became the first boat to record back-to-back Southern 80 victories since Suicide when it recorded record-breaking victories in 1989 and 1990, both times towing local waterskier Jamie Oliver. The record time set in 1990 was 34 minutes and 18 seconds, for an average speed of 140 km/h. That year, the race attracted a then-record 336 entries. God's Gift and Gotta Be Crazy were the two dominant boats of the 1990s, with the North Queensland team of Gotta Be Crazy victorious in 1993 and 1996, while the iconic God's Gift recorded two record-breaking victories in 1995 and 1998. God's Gift towed Oliver to both victories, giving him a record four outright wins for a skier at the time

Top Shot became the first boat to break the 32-minute barrier when it recorded an outright win in 2000., while Blown Budget was a popular winner in 2003, as 11 years earlier Blown Budget's skiers Steve Morley and Brett Dominguez had won the Southern 80 outright with Thundernuts. Both boats were driven by Brett's father, Michael Dominguez. The Hellbent team of driver Mark Cranny and observer Damien Matthews were dominant at the end of the decade, recording Southern 80 wins in 2005, 2006 and 2008. There were no outright winners in the 2009 Southern 80, as the race had to be abandoned on the Sunday as emergency services crews were called away to assist with the Black Saturday bushfires

Cranny and Matthews have dominated the Southern 80 in recent years, recording wins in 2010, 2011, 2012, 2013 and 2015 with Hellrazor. All five victories involved skier Peter Procter, while his teammate in four of the wins was Jason Walmsley. Walmsley also claimed outright Southern 80 victories with Stinga in 2007 and Hellbent in 2008, giving him a record six outright wins for a skier (as of 2015). Cranny holds the record for most wins by a driver with nine, while Matthews has recorded eight outright victories as an observer and one as a skier, back in 1990 with Island Cooler.

== List of outright Southern 80 winners ==
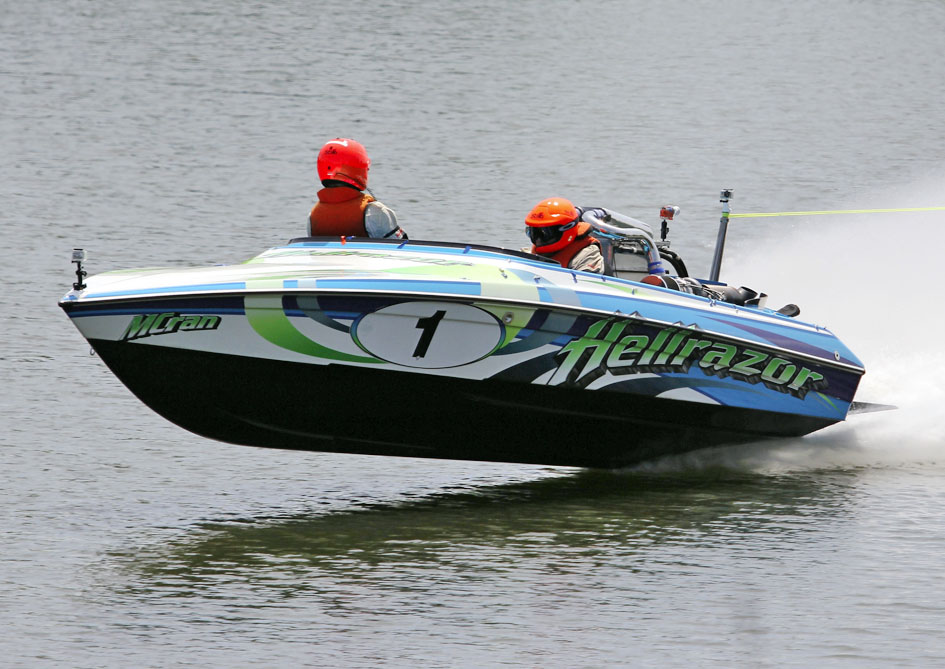
Hellrazor, Southern 80 winner 2002, 2010, 2011, 2012, 2013 and 2015.

Race results are unavailable for most years prior to 1971.

Year	Boat	Time	Driver	Observer	Skiers
1971	Avenger	56.64	Bob Jackson	Wayne Mitchell	Robert Dance, Graham Dance
1972	Thunderbolt	49.38	Wally Hackett	Bruce Sharp	Peter Ward, Bruce Robberds
1973	Siesta Marine	45.00	Tom Wyld	Jim Reid	Rick Williams, Noel Middling
1974	Splinter	43.44	Graham Evans	Petr Crick	Wayne Jones, Neil Harris
1975	Suicide II	42.52	Len Retallick	Anthony Cornelissen	Harry Peeters, Robert Hamilton
1976	Harada	41.00	Jack Skipper	Kevin Hayes	Leigh Knopp, Barry Carne
1977	Suicide	42.05	Len Retallick	Mick Webb	Peter Webb, Roy Turner
1978	Suicide	43.30	Len Retallick	Brian Atta	Stephen Bowers, Roy Turner
1979	The Tack	41.45	Reg Cowie	Tony Beehag	Craig Beehag, Ricky Christian
1980	Violator	40.33	Barry Tudor	Jim Gorey	Neil Sheritt, Trevor Stott
1981	Locomotion	39.28	Peter Waterhouse	Tony Fontio	Phil Robinson, Trevor Stott
1982	Rolco IV	38.25	Ted Hurley	Glynn Hurley	Michael Foott, Brett Stavenuiter
1983	Aquaholic	40.55	Trevor Gallard	Tim Whetstone	Wayne Fazzalari, John Gallard
1984	Rolco VI	40.30	Ted Hurley	Glynn Hurley	Tony McNaughton, David Tarry
1985	Moonshot	39.11	Lester Freemantle	G. O'Brien	Linc Kelly, David Tarry
1986	Rolco	36.18	Murray Price	Gary Price	Linc Kelly, Mark Ward
1987	Recovery	37.15	Ted Hurley	Glynn Hurley	Ken Hoy, Kevin Boylan
1988	Rolco	36.12	Murray Price	Gary Price	Danny Cropper, Craig Brown
1989	Island Cooler	35.03	Dennis Rowbottom	Leo Welch	Jamie Oliver, Mark Pickering
1990	Island Cooler	34.18	Dennis Rowbottom	Leo Welch	Jamie Oliver, Damien Matthews
1991	Mercury Bullet	34.27	Lindsay Beer	Barry McDermott	Gavin Arnott, Scott Kell
1992	Thundernuts	33.34	Michael Dominguez	Eugene Bonollo	Brett Dominguez, Steve Morley
1993	Gotta Be Crazy	33.48	Noel Kelly	Peter Sharp	Ray Brennan, Mark Pickering
1994	Warlord	33.44	Steve Thompson	Dean Leigh	Scott Kell, Rory Brown
1995	God's Gift	32.38	Graham Ritchie	Stuart Thomas	Jamie Oliver, Nathan Glynn
1996	Gotta Be Crazy	32.33	Noel Kelly	Peter Petryszyn	Wayne Mawer, Adrian Pickering
1997	Argo	33.42	Phil Kaal	Jo Kaal	Danny Cropper, Brandon Calder
1998	God's Gift	32.02	Graham Ritchie	Stuart Thomas	Jamie Oliver, Stephen Robertson
1999	Showdown	32.50	Ian Tricker	Steve Cotton	Daniel Cotton, Dean Hanckel
2000	Top Shot	31.23	Tony McLeod	Errol Thurgar	Jamie Graziano, Justin Cadden
2001	The Sting	31.57	Ken Broughton	Heath Broughton	Tim Galvin, Stephen Robertson
2002	Hellrazor	32.33	Mark Cranny	Greg James	Steve Rowe, Justin Cadden
2003	Blown Budget	31.42	Michael Dominguez	Tim Dominguez	Brett Dominguez, Steve Morley
2004	The Axe	32.26	Kelvin Black	Darren Patterson	James Buser, Grant Patterson
2005	Hellbent	32.46	Mark Cranny	Damien Matthews	Steve Rowe, Daniel Campbell
2006	Hellbent	31.37	Mark Cranny	Damien Matthews	James Buser, Daniel Campbell
2007 *	Stinga	19.27	Greg Houston	Kevin Boylan	Chris Gelle, Jason Walmsley
2008	Hellbent	30.43	Mark Cranny	Damien Matthews	Chris Gelle, Jason Walmsley
2009 **					
2010	Hellrazor	30.32	Mark Cranny	Damien Matthews	Peter Procter, Jason Walmsley
2011	Hellrazor	30.58	Mark Cranny	Damien Matthews	Peter Procter, Jason Walmsley
2012	Hellrazor	30.37	Mark Cranny	Damien Matthews	Peter Procter, Michael Kelly
2013	Hellrazor	30.36	Mark Cranny	Damien Matthews	Peter Procter, Jason Walmsley
2014	Wild Thing	32.57	Andy Smith	Peter Thompson	Jared Coey, Justin Cadden
2015	Hellrazor	29.43	Mark Cranny	Damien Matthews	Peter Procter, Jason Walmsley
2016	The Mistress	30.23	Leo Welch	Brian Griffin	Zac Welch, Dylan Stevenson
2017	Merc Force	31.10	Don Gulley	Kevin Boylan	Kristopher Knights, Jake Tegart
2018	Merc Force	30.08	Don Gulley	Kevin Boylan	Kristopher Knights, Jake Tegart
2019	TR	29.22	Ian Tricker	Nathan Miller	Reece Simmonds, Raymond Ball
2020	Superman	31.06	Darren Mcguire	Steven Robertson	Daniel Cotton, Daniel Graziano

- * In 2007, the race was shortened as part of the Murray River course was declared a crime scene, following a death that was unrelated to the race.
- ** In 2009, the race was called off before the Super Class boats took to the course, as emergency service crews were called away to assist with the Black Saturday bushfires.
