= Adam Hyeronimus =

Australian jockey

Personal information
- Nickname: Hippo
- Nationality: Australian
- Born: 1989/1990 Caloundra, Queensland
- Occupation: Jockey

Horse racing career
- Sport: Horse racing
- Career wins: 484

Major racing wins
- Vinery Stud Stakes, The Kosciuszko

Adam Hyeronimus is an Australian professional jockey who has ridden in 3,668 horse races for 484 wins.

== Early life ==
Hyeronimus was born in Caloundra in Queensland and is the son of champion jockey Craig Hyeronimus and grandson of champion jockey Reg Paine. Hyeronimus moved to Macau for several years when his father rode there, before the family returned and settled in Cowra New South Wales. As an 18 year old in 2008 Hyeronimus said "I didn't ride at pony club, I was more interested in playing rugby league, sport "

== Career ==
On Saturday 28 March 2020 Hyeronimus rode his 1st Group One winner aboard the Gai Waterhouse and Adrian Bott trained horse Shout The Bar in the $500,000 Vinery Stud Stakes over 2000m at Rosehill Gardens Racecourse in Sydney.

Nicknamed 'Hippo', Hyeronimus has a long standing association with Australian Racing Hall Of Fame horse trainer Gai Waterhouse. When asked about Hyeronimus, Waterhouse said "Adam Hyeronimus is riding absolutely super, he understands the pace of races, never bustles them, he rates them perfectly. It’s a real art." Another big race win for the jockey was in October 2018 when Hyeronimus 'stole' the inaugural $1.3m The Kosciuszko on Grafton galloper Belflyer, who started $71. Hyeronimus had stints with Grafton trainer John Shelton and Jason Coyle at Warwick Farm Racecourse before ending up at Tulloch Lodge with Gai Waterhouse.
