= 2024 Brisbane International =

Tennis tournament

- Date: 31 December 2023–7 January 2024
- Edition: 13th
- Category: ATP Tour 250 series WTA 500 series
- Draw: 32S / 24D (ATP); 48S / 24D (WTA)
- Prize money: $739,945 (ATP) $1,736,763 (WTA)
- Surface: Hard
- Location: Tennyson, Brisbane, Queensland, Australia
- Venue: Queensland Tennis Centre

Champions

Men's singles
- (Bulgaria) Grigor Dimitrov

Women's singles
- (Kazakhstan) Elena Rybakina

Men's doubles
- (United Kingdom) Lloyd Glasspool / (Netherlands) Jean-Julien Rojer

Women's doubles
- (Ukraine) Lyudmyla Kichenok / (Latvia) Jeļena Ostapenko
- Brisbane International

The 2024 Brisbane International was a professional tennis tournament on the 2024 ATP Tour and 2024 WTA Tour. It was played on outdoor hard courts in Brisbane, Queensland, Australia. This was the thirteenth edition of the tournament and took place at the Queensland Tennis Centre in Tennyson as part of the Australian Open Series in preparation for the first Grand Slam of the year, and this was also the first tournament since 2020 (and men's events since 2019) after intervening editions cancelled due to the COVID-19 pandemic.

== Points distribution ==
Event	W	F	SF	QF	R16	R32	R64	Q	Q2	Q1
Men's singles	250	165	100	50	25	0	—N/a	13	7	0
Men's doubles	250	150	90	45	20	0	—N/a	—N/a	—N/a	—N/a
Women's singles	500	325	195	108	60	32	1	25	13	1
Women's doubles	500	325	195	108	60	1	—N/a	—N/a	—N/a	—N/a

== Champions ==
=== Men's singles ===
- (Bulgaria) Grigor Dimitrov def. (Denmark) Holger Rune, 7–6^{(7–5)}, 6–4

=== Women's singles ===
- (Kazakhstan) Elena Rybakina def. Aryna Sabalenka, 6–0, 6–3

=== Men's doubles ===
- (United Kingdom) Lloyd Glasspool / (Netherlands) Jean-Julien Rojer def. (Germany) Kevin Krawietz / (Germany) Tim Pütz, 7–6^{(7–3)}, 5–7, [12–10]

=== Women's doubles ===
- (Ukraine) Lyudmyla Kichenok / (Latvia) Jeļena Ostapenko def. (Belgium) Greet Minnen / (United Kingdom) Heather Watson, 7–5, 6–2

== ATP singles main-draw entrants ==
=== Seeds ===
Country	Player	Rank^{1}	Seed
DEN	Holger Rune	8	1
BUL	Grigor Dimitrov	14	2
USA	Ben Shelton	17	3
FRA	Ugo Humbert	20	4
USA	Sebastian Korda	24	5
ARG	Sebastián Báez	28	6
ARG	Tomás Martín Etcheverry	30	7
	Aslan Karatsev	35	8

- ^{1} Rankings are as of 25 December 2023.

=== Other entrants ===
The following players received wildcards into the singles main draw:

- (Australia) Rinky Hijikata
- (Australia) Jason Kubler
- (Spain) Rafael Nadal

The following player received entry into the singles main draw under the ATP Next Gen programme for players aged under 20 and ranked in the top 250:

- (France) Luca Van Assche

The following players received entry from the qualifying draw:

- (Australia) James Duckworth
- (Slovakia) Lukáš Klein
- (Czech Republic) Tomáš Macháč
- (United States) Alex Michelsen
- (Austria) Dominic Thiem
- (Australia) Li Tu

=== Withdrawals ===
- (United States) Marcos Giron → replaced by (Australia) Christopher O'Connell
- (Japan) Yoshihito Nishioka → replaced by (Australia) Aleksandar Vukic
- (United States) Reilly Opelka → replaced by (Australia) Thanasi Kokkinakis

== ATP doubles main-draw entrants ==
=== Seeds ===
Country	Player	Country	Player	Rank^{1}	Seed
GER	Kevin Krawietz	GER	Tim Pütz	45	1
GBR	Lloyd Glasspool	NED	Jean-Julien Rojer	49	2
USA	Nathaniel Lammons	USA	Jackson Withrow	49	3
AUS	Rinky Hijikata	AUS	Jason Kubler	53	4
CRO	Nikola Mektić	MON	Hugo Nys	58	5
FIN	Harri Heliövaara	AUS	John Peers	68	6
ECU	Gonzalo Escobar	KAZ	Aleksandr Nedovyesov	96	7
IND	Yuki Bhambri	NED	Robin Haase	103	8

- ^{1} Rankings are as of 25 December 2023.

=== Other entrants ===
The following pairs received wildcards into the doubles main draw:

- (Australia) James Duckworth / (Australia) Christopher O'Connell
- (Spain) Marc López / (Spain) Rafael Nadal

=== Alternates ===
The following pair received entry as alternates:

- (Argentina) Sebastián Báez / (Argentina) Francisco Comesaña

=== Withdrawals ===
- (Argentina) Máximo González / (Argentina) Andrés Molteni → replaced by (Argentina) Sebastián Báez / (Argentina) Francisco Comesaña

== WTA singles main-draw entrants ==
=== Seeds ===
Country	Player	Rank^{1}	Seed
	Aryna Sabalenka	2	1
KAZ	Elena Rybakina	4	2
LAT	Jeļena Ostapenko	13	3
	Liudmila Samsonova	16	4
	Daria Kasatkina	18	5
	Veronika Kudermetova	19	6
	Ekaterina Alexandrova	21	7
	Victoria Azarenka	22	8
POL	Magda Linette	24	9
ROU	Sorana Cîrstea	26	10
	Anastasia Potapova	27	11
UKR	Anhelina Kalinina	28	12
BEL	Elise Mertens	29	13
USA	Sofia Kenin	33	14
CHN	Zhu Lin	37	15
CZE	Karolína Plíšková	38	16

- ^{1} Rankings are as of 25 December 2023.

=== Other entrants ===
The following players received wildcards into the singles main draw:

- (Australia) Kimberly Birrell
- (Japan) Naomi Osaka
- (Australia) Arina Rodionova
- (Australia) Daria Saville

The following players received entry from the qualifying draw:

- (Hungary) Tímea Babos
- (United States) Hailey Baptiste
- (Australia) Olivia Gadecki
- (Argentina) Julia Riera
- (Turkey) Zeynep Sönmez
- (Ukraine) Dayana Yastremska

=== Withdrawals ===
- (Romania) Irina-Camelia Begu → replaced by (United States) Ashlyn Krueger
- (United States) Madison Keys → replaced by Diana Shnaider
- (Czech Republic) Karolína Muchová → replaced by (Germany) Tamara Korpatsch
- (Argentina) Nadia Podoroska → replaced by (Spain) Cristina Bucșa

== WTA doubles main-draw entrants ==
=== Seeds ===
Country	Player	Country	Player	Rank^{1}	Seed
TPE	Hsieh Su-wei	BEL	Elise Mertens	8	1
TPE	Chan Hao-ching	MEX	Giuliana Olmos	46	2
JPN	Miyu Kato	INA	Aldila Sutjiadi	53	3
~~BRA~~	~~Ingrid Martins~~	~~BRA~~	~~Luisa Stefani~~	~~66~~	~~4~~
UKR	Lyudmyla Kichenok	LAT	Jeļena Ostapenko	70	5
	Veronika Kudermetova		Liudmila Samsonova	71	6
HUN	Tímea Babos	UKR	Marta Kostyuk	94	7
JPN	Eri Hozumi	JPN	Makoto Ninomiya	99	8

- ^{1} Rankings are as of 25 December 2023.

=== Other entrants ===
The following pairs received wildcards into the doubles main draw:

- (Australia) Talia Gibson / (Australia) Priscilla Hon
- Daria Kasatkina / (Australia) Daria Saville

The following pair received entry as alternates:

- (Czech Republic) Linda Nosková / Diana Shnaider

=== Withdrawals ===
- (Brazil) Ingrid Martins / (Brazil) Luisa Stefani → replaced by (Czech Republic) Linda Nosková / Diana Shnaider
