= 2024 Brisbane International – Women's singles =

Women's singles
- 2024 Brisbane International

Final
- Champion: (Kazakhstan) Elena Rybakina
- Runner-up: Aryna Sabalenka
- Score: 6–0, 6–3

Details
- Draw: 48 (6 Q / 4 WC )
- Seeds: 16

Events
Singles	men	women
Doubles	men	women
- Brisbane International

Elena Rybakina defeated Aryna Sabalenka in the final, 6–0, 6–3 to win the women's singles tennis title at the 2024 Brisbane International. She did not lose a set en route to her sixth WTA Tour title, becoming the first player to do so at Brisbane since Victoria Azarenka in 2016. The final was a rematch of the previous year's Australian Open final, in which Sabalenka had prevailed.

Karolína Plíšková was the two-time defending champion from when the event was last held in 2020, but lost in the third round to Jeļena Ostapenko.

This tournament marked the return to professional tennis of former world No. 1 and four-time major champion Naomi Osaka, who had not played a professional match since September 2022 due to maternity leave. She lost to Plíšková in the second round.

== Seeds ==
All seeds received a bye into the second round.

1. Aryna Sabalenka (final)
2. (Kazakhstan) Elena Rybakina (champion)
3. (Latvia) Jeļena Ostapenko (quarterfinals)
4. Liudmila Samsonova (second round)
5. Daria Kasatkina (quarterfinals)
6. Veronika Kudermetova (third round)
7. Ekaterina Alexandrova (second round)
8. Victoria Azarenka (semifinals)

9. (Poland) Magda Linette (third round)
10. (Romania) Sorana Cîrstea (second round)
11. Anastasia Potapova (quarterfinals, retired)
12. (Ukraine) Anhelina Kalinina (second round)
13. (Belgium) Elise Mertens (third round)
14. (United States) Sofia Kenin (second round)
15. (China) Zhu Lin (third round)
16. (Czech Republic) Karolína Plíšková (third round)

Click on the seed number of a player to go to their draw section.

== Draw ==
Key

- Q = Qualifier
- WC = Wild card
- LL = Lucky loser
- Alt = Alternate
- ITF = ITF entry
- PR = Protected ranking
- SR = Special ranking
- SE = Special exempt
- JE = Junior exempt
- JR = Junior Accelerator Programme entrant
- CO = College Accelerator Programme entrant
- NG = Next Gen Accelerator Program entrant
- w/o = Walkover
- r = Retired
- d = Defaulted

=== Finals ===
Quarterfinals
1	Aryna Sabalenka	6	6
5	Daria Kasatkina	1	4
3	(Latvia) Jeļena Ostapenko	3	6	5
8	Victoria Azarenka	6	3	7
(Czech Republic) Linda Nosková	7	6
Mirra Andreeva	5	3
11	Anastasia Potapova	1	0^{r}
2	(Kazakhstan) Elena Rybakina	6	0

Semifinals
1	Aryna Sabalenka	6	6
8	Victoria Azarenka	2	4
(Czech Republic) Linda Nosková	3	2
2	(Kazakhstan) Elena Rybakina	6	6

Final
1	Aryna Sabalenka	0	3
2	(Kazakhstan) Elena Rybakina	6	6

=== Top half ===
==== Section 1 ====
First round
(Italy) L Bronzetti	6	7
(United States) A Krueger	4	5
Q	(United States) H Baptiste	1	6	3
(United States) D Collins	6	4	6
(Spain) C Bucșa	5	6	6
(Belgium) G Minnen	7	3	1
(Romania) A Bogdan	6	3	3
(Ukraine) M Kostyuk	4	6	6

Second round
1	A Sabalenka	6	6
(Italy) L Bronzetti	3	0
(United States) D Collins	6	3	6^{7}
15	(China) L Zhu	1	6	7^{9}
9	(Poland) M Linette	6	7
(Spain) C Bucșa	3	5
(Ukraine) M Kostyuk	3	4
5	D Kasatkina	6	6

Third round
1	A Sabalenka	6	6
15	(China) L Zhu	1	0
9	(Poland) M Linette	4	2
5	D Kasatkina	6	6

Quarterfinals
1	A Sabalenka	6	6
5	D Kasatkina	1	4

==== Section 2 ====
First round
(United States) P Stearns	7	2	3
(Italy) C Giorgi	5	6	6
WC	(Japan) N Osaka	6	7^{11}
(Germany) T Korpatsch	3	6^{9}
Q	(Turkey) Z Sönmez	4	2
(France) C Burel	6	6
A Kalinskaya	6	6
(United States) B Pera	2	1

Second round
3	(Latvia) J Ostapenko	6	6
(Italy) C Giorgi	1	4
WC	(Japan) N Osaka	6	6^{4}	4
16	(Czech Republic) Ka Plíšková	3	7^{7}	6
12	(Ukraine) A Kalinina	4	1
(France) C Burel	6	6
A Kalinskaya	1	6^{8}
8	V Azarenka	6	7^{10}

Third round
3	(Latvia) J Ostapenko	6	4	6
16	(Czech Republic) Ka Plíšková	2	6	3
(France) C Burel	5	2
8	V Azarenka	7	6

Quarterfinals
3	(Latvia) J Ostapenko	3	6	5
8	V Azarenka	6	3	7

=== Bottom half ===
==== Section 3 ====
First round
Q	(Argentina) J Riera	6	6
(Bulgaria) V Tomova	2	4
(Czech Republic) L Nosková	5	7^{10}	7^{7}
Q	(Hungary) T Babos	7	6^{8}	6^{2}
WC	(Australia) Ar Rodionova	6	6
(Italy) M Trevisan	3	2
D Shnaider	2	3
M Andreeva	6	6

Second round
7	E Alexandrova	3	4
Q	(Argentina) J Riera	6	6
(Czech Republic) L Nosková	6	4	6
10	(Romania) S Cîrstea	4	6	4
14	(United States) S Kenin	5	6^{7}
WC	(Australia) Ar Rodionova	7	7^{9}
M Andreeva	6	6
4	L Samsonova	2	1

Third round
Q	(Argentina) J Riera	1	7^{7}	3
(Czech Republic) L Nosková	6	6^{4}	6
WC	(Australia) Ar Rodionova	1	1
M Andreeva	6	6

Quarterfinals
(Czech Republic) L Nosková	7	6
M Andreeva	5	3

==== Section 4 ====
First round
(Slovakia) AK Schmiedlová	3	6	6
(United States) C Dolehide	6	4	2
WC	(Australia) D Saville	6	6
Q	(Ukraine) D Yastremska	0	4
(Czech Republic) K Siniaková	5	3
(United States) S Stephens	7	6
WC	(Australia) K Birrell	6	0	4
Q	(Australia) O Gadecki	4	6	6

Second round
6	V Kudermetova	6	6
(Slovakia) AK Schmiedlová	2	3
WC	(Australia) D Saville	4	6	4
11	A Potapova	6	3	6
13	(Belgium) E Mertens	2	6	6
(United States) S Stephens	6	1	3
Q	(Australia) O Gadecki	4	1
2	(Kazakhstan) E Rybakina	6	6

Third round
6	V Kudermetova	5	7^{9}	4
11	A Potapova	7	6^{7}	6
13	(Belgium) E Mertens	1	0
2	(Kazakhstan) E Rybakina	6	6

Quarterfinals
11	A Potapova	1	0^{r}
2	(Kazakhstan) E Rybakina	6	0

== Qualifying ==
=== Seeds ===
1. Aliaksandra Sasnovich (qualifying competition)
2. (Ukraine) Dayana Yastremska (qualified)
3. (Japan) Mai Hontama (qualifying competition)
4. (Australia) Olivia Gadecki (qualified)
5. (Slovakia) Rebecca Šramková (first round)
6. (United States) Hailey Baptiste (qualified)
7. (United Kingdom) Heather Watson (first round)
8. (Argentina) Julia Riera (qualified)
9. Valeria Savinykh (qualifying competition)
10. (Argentina) Martina Capurro Taborda (first round)
11. (France) Léolia Jeanjean (first round)
12. (Ukraine) Yulia Starodubtseva (qualifying competition)

=== Qualifiers ===
1. (Turkey) Zeynep Sönmez
2. (Ukraine) Dayana Yastremska
3. (Argentina) Julia Riera
4. (Australia) Olivia Gadecki
5. (Hungary) Tímea Babos
6. (United States) Hailey Baptiste

=== Qualifying draw ===
==== First qualifier ====
First round
1	Aliaksandra Sasnovich	6	6
WC	(Australia) Seone Mendez	1	3
(Turkey) Zeynep Sönmez	3	6	6
7	(United Kingdom) Heather Watson	6	1	3

Qualifying competition
1	Aliaksandra Sasnovich	4	5
(Turkey) Zeynep Sönmez	6	7

==== Second qualifier ====
First round
2	(Ukraine) Dayana Yastremska	6	6
PR	(Chinese Taipei) Hsieh Su-wei	2	2
WC	(Australia) Maddison Inglis	3	6	4
12	(Ukraine) Yulia Starodubtseva	6	2	6

Qualifying competition
2	(Ukraine) Dayana Yastremska	6	6
12	(Ukraine) Yulia Starodubtseva	3	3

==== Third qualifier ====
First round
3	(Japan) Mai Hontama	7	6
(France) Chloé Paquet	5	3
(Australia) Priscilla Hon	6	6^{3}	3
8	(Argentina) Julia Riera	3	7^{7}	6

Qualifying competition
3	(Japan) Mai Hontama	7^{7}	1	1
8	(Argentina) Julia Riera	6^{3}	6	6

==== Fourth qualifier ====
First round
4	(Australia) Olivia Gadecki	7	6
PR	(Serbia) Aleksandra Krunić	5	0
WC	(Australia) Jaimee Fourlis	7^{10}	5	2
9	Valeria Savinykh	6^{8}	7	6

Qualifying competition
4	(Australia) Olivia Gadecki	6	6
9	Valeria Savinykh	3	2

==== Fifth qualifier ====
First round
5	(Slovakia) Rebecca Šramková	6^{1}	4
(Hungary) Tímea Babos	7^{7}	6
WC	(Australia) Talia Gibson	4	6	6
11	(France) Léolia Jeanjean	6	3	4

Qualifying competition
(Hungary) Tímea Babos	5	7	6
WC	(Australia) Talia Gibson	7	5	2

==== Sixth qualifier ====
First round
6	(United States) Hailey Baptiste	6	6
(Czech Republic) Gabriela Knutson	1	0
Sofya Lansere	6	6
10	(Argentina) Martina Capurro Taborda	2	1

Qualifying competition
6	(United States) Hailey Baptiste	6	7
Sofya Lansere	3	5
