= 2024 Brisbane International – Men's singles =

Men's singles
- 2024 Brisbane International

Final
- Champion: (Bulgaria) Grigor Dimitrov
- Runner-up: (Denmark) Holger Rune
- Score: 7–6^{(7–5)}, 6–4

Details
- Draw: 32 (6 Q / 3 WC )
- Seeds: 8

Events
Singles	men	women
Doubles	men	women
- Brisbane International

Grigor Dimitrov defeated Holger Rune in the final, 7–6^{(7–5)}, 6–4 to win the men's singles tennis title at the 2024 Brisbane International. This was Dimitrov's second title in Brisbane (after 2017) and his first ATP Tour title overall since the 2017 ATP Finals.

Kei Nishikori was the reigning champion from 2019, when the men's event was last held, but did not participate this year.

Former world No. 1 and 22-time major champion Rafael Nadal made his return to the ATP Tour after almost a year out due to injury, entering the tournament as a wild card. He lost to Jordan Thompson in the quarterfinals. Rafael Nadal held 3 match points in the second set but did not convert.

== Seeds ==
1. (Denmark) Holger Rune (final)
2. (Bulgaria) Grigor Dimitrov (champion)
3. (United States) Ben Shelton (first round)
4. (France) Ugo Humbert (second round, withdrew)
5. (United States) Sebastian Korda (first round)
6. (Argentina) Sebastián Báez (first round)
7. (Argentina) Tomás Martín Etcheverry (first round)
8. Aslan Karatsev (first round, retired)

== Draw ==
Key

- Q = Qualifier
- WC = Wild card
- LL = Lucky loser
- Alt = Alternate
- ITF = ITF entry
- PR = Protected ranking
- SR = Special ranking
- SE = Special exempt
- JE = Junior exempt
- JR = Junior Accelerator Programme entrant
- CO = College Accelerator Programme entrant
- NG = Next Gen Accelerator Program entrant
- w/o = Walkover
- r = Retired
- d = Defaulted

=== Finals ===
Semifinals
1	(Denmark) Holger Rune	6	7^{7}
Roman Safiullin	4	6^{0}
(Australia) Jordan Thompson	3	5
2	(Bulgaria) Grigor Dimitrov	6	7

Final
1	(Denmark) Holger Rune	6^{5}	4
2	(Bulgaria) Grigor Dimitrov	7^{7}	6

=== Top half ===
First round
1	(Denmark) H Rune	4	6	6
(Australia) M Purcell	6	4	2
(France) L Van Assche	3	2
A Shevchenko	6	6
(United States) JJ Wolf	3	4
Q	(Australia) J Duckworth	6	6
(Germany) Y Hanfmann	7	6
5	(United States) S Korda	5	4
3	(United States) B Shelton	3	7^{7}	3
R Safiullin	6	6^{5}	6
(Australia) A Popyrin	6	6^{5}	7^{7}
(Australia) C O'Connell	4	7^{7}	6^{4}
(Italy) M Arnaldi	6^{5}	6	7^{9}
(Hungary) M Fucsovics	7^{7}	4	6^{7}
Q	(Slovakia) L Klein	4	6	6
6	(Argentina) S Báez	6	3	4

Second round
1	(Denmark) H Rune	6	5	6
A Shevchenko	4	7	2
Q	(Australia) J Duckworth	4	6	7^{7}
(Germany) Y Hanfmann	6	1	6^{2}
R Safiullin	6^{9}	6	7^{7}
(Australia) A Popyrin	7^{11}	4	6^{3}
(Italy) M Arnaldi	6	3	7
Q	(Slovakia) L Klein	4	6	5

Quarterfinals
1	(Denmark) H Rune	6	7^{8}
Q	(Australia) J Duckworth	2	6^{6}
R Safiullin	7^{7}	6
(Italy) M Arnaldi	6^{4}	2

Semifinals
1	(Denmark) H Rune	6	7^{7}
R Safiullin	4	6^{0}

=== Bottom half ===
First round
8	A Karatsev	4	7^{7}	0^{r}
WC	(Australia) J Kubler	6	6^{4}	0
Q	(Austria) D Thiem	5	1
WC	(Spain) R Nadal	7	6
(Australia) J Thompson	6	6
(Australia) A Vukic	3	2
Q	(United States) A Michelsen	4	4
4	(France) U Humbert	6	6
7	(Argentina) TM Etcheverry	7^{7}	5	6^{1}
Q	(Czech Republic) T Macháč	6^{5}	7	7^{7}
(Australia) T Kokkinakis	6^{8}	2
WC	(Australia) R Hijikata	7^{10}	6
Q	(Australia) L Tu	6^{5}	6^{4}
(Germany) D Altmaier	7^{7}	7^{7}
(United Kingdom) A Murray	6	5	2
2	(Bulgaria) G Dimitrov	4	7	6

Second round
WC	(Australia) J Kubler	1	2
WC	(Spain) R Nadal	6	6
(Australia) J Thompson	w/o
4	(France) U Humbert
Q	(Czech Republic) T Macháč	7	2	6^{4}
WC	(Australia) R Hijikata	5	6	7^{7}
(Germany) D Altmaier	1	2
2	(Bulgaria) G Dimitrov	6	6

Quarterfinals
WC	(Spain) R Nadal	7	6^{6}	3
(Australia) J Thompson	5	7^{8}	6
WC	(Australia) R Hijikata	1	4
2	(Bulgaria) G Dimitrov	6	6

Semifinals
(Australia) J Thompson	3	5
2	(Bulgaria) G Dimitrov	6	7

== Qualifying ==
=== Seeds ===
1. (Czech Republic) Tomáš Macháč (qualified)
2. (France) Grégoire Barrère (qualifying competition)
3. (Colombia) Daniel Elahi Galán (qualifying competition)
4. (United States) Alex Michelsen (qualified)
5. (Austria) Dominic Thiem (qualified)
6. (France) Quentin Halys (first round)
7. (United States) Aleksandar Kovacevic (qualifying competition)
8. (Argentina) Diego Schwartzman (qualifying competition)
9. (Australia) James Duckworth (qualified)
10. (Argentina) Francisco Comesaña (first round)
11. (United States) Maxime Cressy (qualifying competition)
12. (Italy) Giulio Zeppieri (qualifying competition)

=== Qualifiers ===
1. (Czech Republic) Tomáš Macháč
2. (Australia) James Duckworth
3. (Australia) Li Tu
4. (United States) Alex Michelsen
5. (Austria) Dominic Thiem
6. (Slovakia) Lukáš Klein

=== Qualifying draw ===
==== First qualifier ====
First round
1	(Czech Republic) Tomáš Macháč	7^{7}	6
WC	(Australia) Blake Ellis	6^{2}	2
(Italy) Federico Gaio	6^{5}	2
7	(United States) Aleksandar Kovacevic	7^{7}	6

Qualifying competition
1	(Czech Republic) Tomáš Macháč	6	6
7	(United States) Aleksandar Kovacevic	4	2

==== Second qualifier ====
First round
2	(France) Grégoire Barrère	6	6
WC	(Australia) Dane Sweeny	3	0
(Australia) Philip Sekulic	6^{5}	4
9	(Australia) James Duckworth	7^{7}	6

Qualifying competition
2	(France) Grégoire Barrère	1	6^{2}
9	(Australia) James Duckworth	6	7^{7}

==== Third qualifier ====
First round
3	(Colombia) Daniel Elahi Galán	7	6
PR	Andrey Kuznetsov	5	3
(Australia) Li Tu	7^{7}	5	7^{7}
10	(Argentina) Francisco Comesaña	6^{1}	7	6^{3}

Qualifying competition
3	(Colombia) Daniel Elahi Galán	3	6^{5}
(Australia) Li Tu	6	7^{7}

==== Fourth qualifier ====
First round
4	(United States) Alex Michelsen	6	6
(Italy) Alessandro Giannessi	3	2
WC	(Australia) Jacob Bradshaw	2	4
8	(Argentina) Diego Schwartzman	6	6

Qualifying competition
4	(United States) Alex Michelsen	6	6
8	(Argentina) Diego Schwartzman	1	4

==== Fifth qualifier ====
First round
5	(Austria) Dominic Thiem	2	7^{7}	6
(Australia) James McCabe	6	6^{4}	4
WC	(Australia) Omar Jasika	5	3
12	(Italy) Giulio Zeppieri	7	6

Qualifying competition
5	(Austria) Dominic Thiem	3	6	6
12	(Italy) Giulio Zeppieri	6	4	4

==== Sixth qualifier ====
First round
6	(France) Quentin Halys	4	6^{1}
(Slovakia) Lukáš Klein	6	7^{7}
(United Kingdom) Ryan Peniston	4	4
11	(United States) Maxime Cressy	6	6

Qualifying competition
(Slovakia) Lukáš Klein	4	7^{10}	6
11	(United States) Maxime Cressy	6	6^{8}	4
