= 2009 Brisbane International =

Coordinates: 27°31′30″S 153°0′26″E

- Date: 4–11 January 2009
- Edition: 1st
- Surface: Hard
- Location: Brisbane, Australia

Champions

Men's singles
- (Czech Republic) Radek Štěpánek

Women's singles
- (Belarus) Victoria Azarenka

Men's doubles
- (France) Marc Gicquel / (France) Jo-Wilfried Tsonga

Women's doubles
- (Germany) Anna-Lena Grönefeld / (United States) Vania King
- Brisbane International

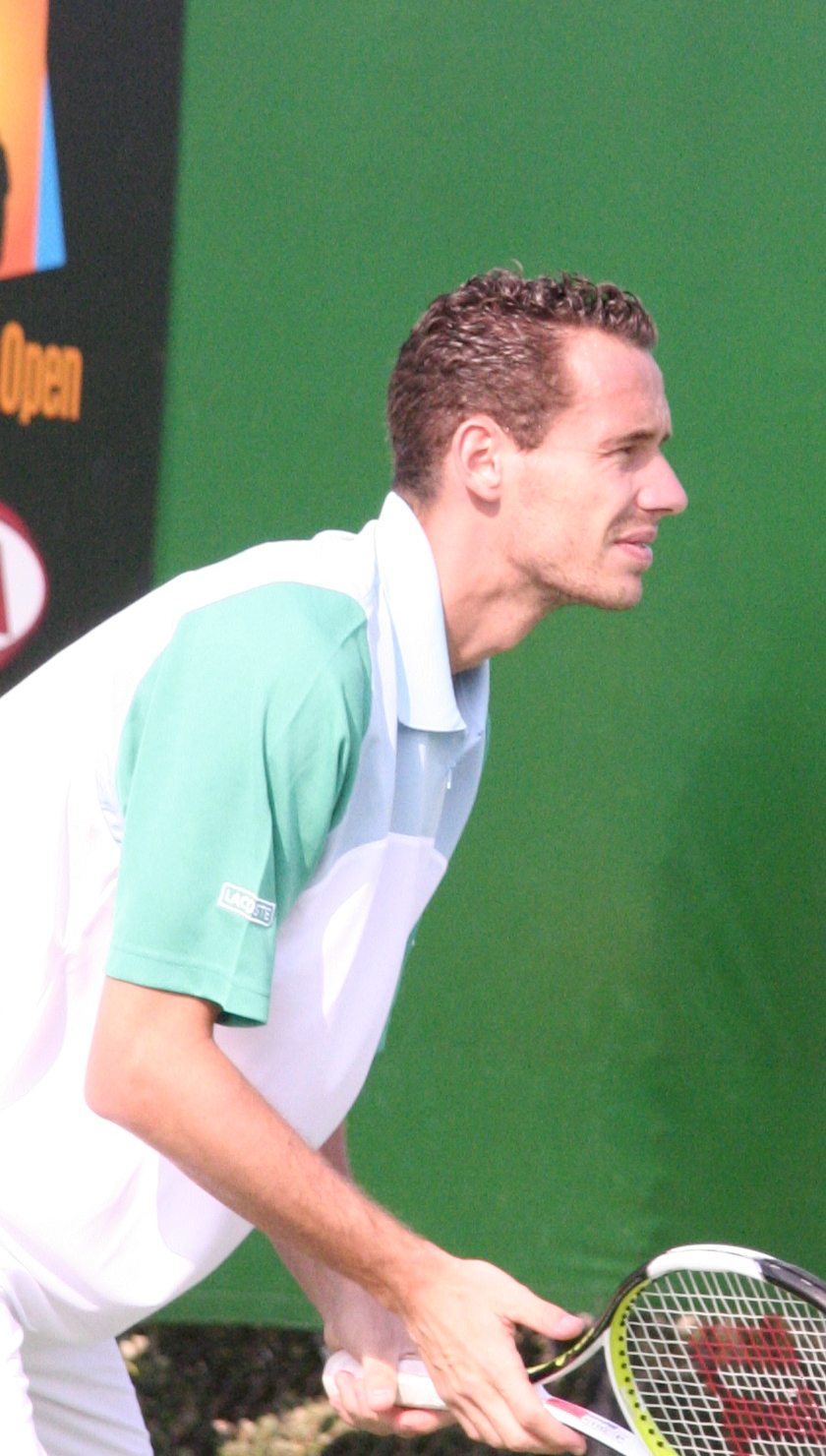
2008 Adelaide champion Michaël Llodra

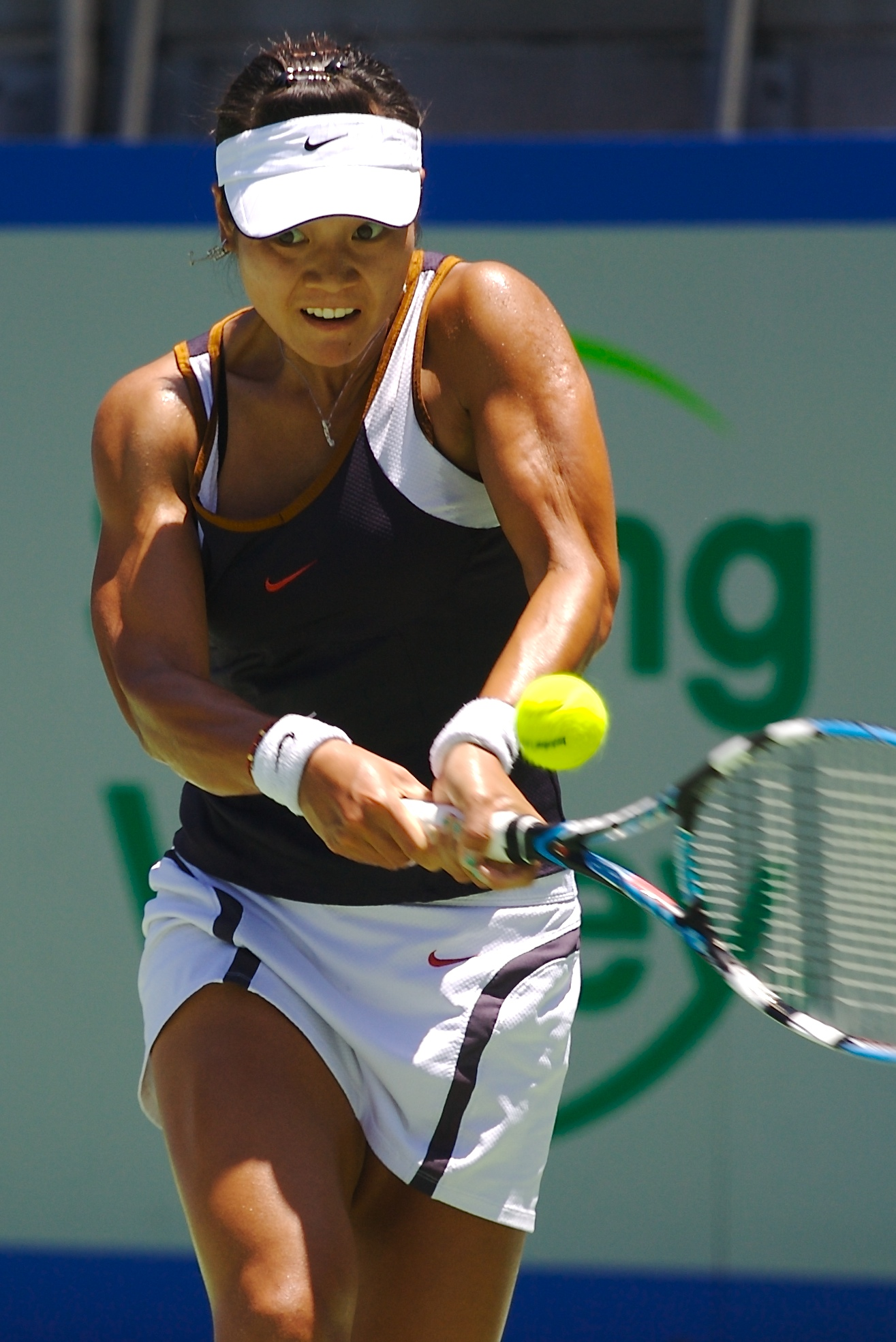
2008 Gold Coast champion Li Na

The 2009 Brisbane International was a professional tennis tournament played on outdoor hard courts in Brisbane, Queensland. It was the first edition of the event known as the Brisbane International and resulted from the merger of the Next Generation Adelaide International on the men's tour with the Mondial Australian Women's Hardcourts on the women's tour. The 2009 Brisbane International was a World Tour 250 series event on the ATP Tour and an International series event on the WTA Tour. Both the men's and women's events took place at the Queensland Tennis Centre in Tennyson from 4 January through 11 January 2009.

The men's draw was led by Novak Djokovic, who was the World No. 3 ranked player, 2008 Australian Open champion, 2008 Pacific Life Open champion, and 2008 Tennis Masters Cup winner. Joining Djokovic in the tournament was Jo-Wilfried Tsonga, who was the 2008 Australian Open runner-up and the 2008 champion of the tournament in Bangkok and the Masters Series tournament in Paris. Fernando Verdasco, a member of Spain's 2008 Davis Cup championship team and the winner of the tournament in Umag, also played in Adelaide. Also lined up for this tournament were Lyon titlist Robin Söderling, Tokyo winner Tomáš Berdych, Mardy Fish, Richard Gasquet, and Radek Štěpánek.

The women's field featured Ana Ivanovic, the World No. 5 ranked player, a former World No. 1, 2008 Australian Open runner-up, and champion of the 2008 French Open and 2008 Pacific Life Open. Joining Ivanovic in the tournament was Victoria Azarenka, who was the runner-up at the 2008 Generali Ladies Linz tournament, the 2008 Gold Coast tournament and the 2008 Prague Open tournament the previous year. Also present were Marion Bartoli, the runner-up at the 2008 tournament in Stanford; Daniela Hantuchová, 2008 Australian Open semifinalist; Amélie Mauresmo, a former World No. 1, champion of the 2008 tournament in Cincinnati, and semifinalist at the 2008 tournament in New Haven, Connecticut; World No. 26 Kaia Kanepi; and World No. 30 Francesca Schiavone. The seventh seed, Maria Kirilenko, had to withdraw because of a viral illness.

== Review ==
=== Day one: 4 January ===
In women's singles, Victoria Azarenka, the second seed, defeated Kateryna Bondarenko 6–0, 6–2. The third seed, Marion Bartoli, overcame home qualifier and world No. 528 Monika Wejnert 6–1, 6–2. The only seed to fall was sixth-seeded Kaia Kanepi who lost to Russian Alisa Kleybanova 6–1, 6–4. In other first round matches, Jarmila Gajdošová advanced to face Azarenka after beating Peng Shuai, and Tsvetana Pironkova defeated Monica Niculescu in straight sets.

Four matches were played in men's singles. Seventh-seeded Richard Gasquet advanced to the second round with a 4–6, 6–2, 6–2 victory over fellow Frenchman Marc Gicquel. Robin Söderling, the fourth seed, also reached the second round, beating Sam Querrey 6–3, 6–3. Taylor Dent and Julien Benneteau also won against Steve Darcis and Robby Ginepri, respectively. Dent, who had thought his career was over following back surgery and sliding down to world No. 865 in the rankings from a career high of world No. 21, set up a second round match against Gasquet.

- Seeded player out (singles): Kaia Kanepi

=== Day two: 5 January ===
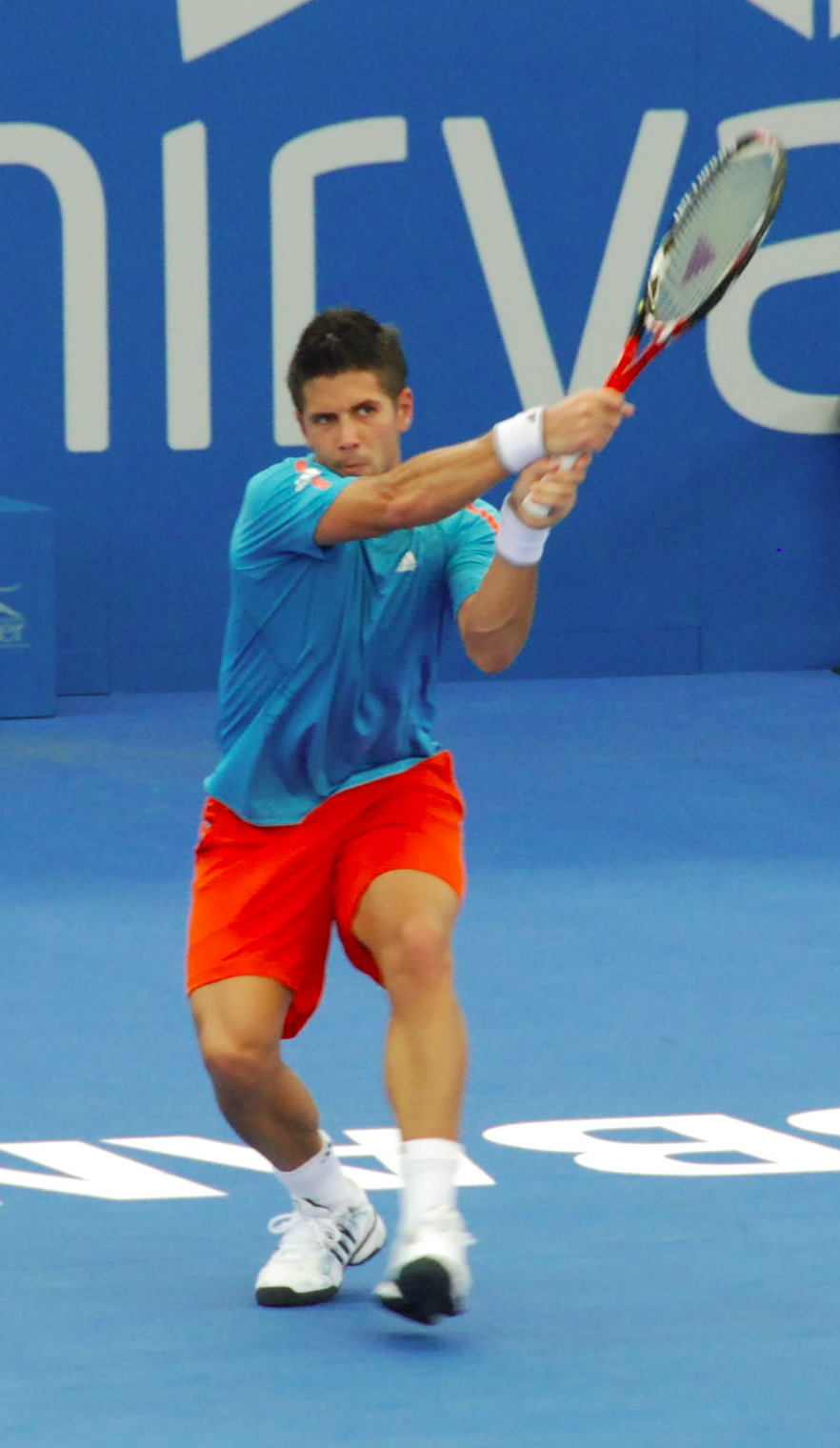
Fernando Verdasco

First round play in women's and men's singles continued on day two while the doubles events also started. Four matches were completed in the men's singles tournament. Third-seeded Spaniard Fernando Verdasco, aiming for his first career hard court title, defeated Australian wildcard Bernard Tomic 6–2, 6–4. The other seed in action, Radek Štěpánek from the Czech Republic, beat Russian doubles specialist Igor Kunitsyn 6–2, 6–2. The other players to progress to round two were Finnish player Jarkko Nieminen, who took just over 2 hours to win 5–7, 6–1, 6–4 against Cypriot Marcos Baghdatis, the 2007 Australian Open runner-up who is just now returning from injury. The only seed to exit the tournament on day two was Mardy Fish, the sixth-seeded American who lost 6–4, 4–6, 7–6(4) to Jürgen Melzer of Austria.

The majority of first round matches in women's singles was played on day two, with three of the seeds failing to progress. Fourth-seeded Slovak Daniela Hantuchová was knocked out by Italian Sara Errani. After taking the first set in a tiebreak, she lost the next two sets 6–4, 6–0. Eighth-seeded Francesca Schiavone of Italy lost 7–5, 6–2 to Belarusian Olga Govortsova. Ai Sugiyama, who replaced Maria Kirilenko as a seeded player, was defeated by home-favourite Samantha Stosur 6–2, 6–3. A couple of seeds did make the second round, however: top seeded Serbian Ana Ivanovic needed 1 hour, 45 minutes to win her match against Czech Petra Kvitová 6–4, 6–2 and former world No. 1 Amélie Mauresmo, the fifth-seeded Frenchwoman, triumphed 7–6(9), 7–6(5) over home player Jelena Dokić. Qualifiers Roberta Vinci (Italy), Melinda Czink (Hungary) and Bulgarian Sesil Karatantcheva advanced against Anna-Lena Grönefeld, Alona Bondarenko, and Iveta Benešová. Lucky loser Julie Coin of France, who was accepted into the tournament when Kirilenko withdrew, beat Belgian Yanina Wickmayer 7–5, 6–7(5), 7–6(3) in the longest women's match so far at almost 3 hours 20 minutes. Unseeded Czech Lucie Šafářová also won against Australian wildcard Isabella Holland 6–4, 6–3.

Just one match was played in the women's doubles and it saw unseeded duo Mervana Jugić-Salkić from Bosnia and Chinese player Peng Shuai defeat Akgul Amanmuradova from Uzbekistan and Yuliana Fedak of Ukraine 6–1, 6–4. In the men's competition, third seeds Simon Aspelin and Pavel Vízner saw off singles players Julien Benneteau and Michaël Llodra 6–4, 7–5 while in a match of the singles specialists, French duo Marc Gicquel and Jo-Wilfried Tsonga beat countryman Paul-Henri Mathieu and his Croatian partner Mario Ančić 7–5, 4–6, [10-4] (champions tiebreak).

- Seeded players out (singles): Mardy Fish; Francesca Schiavone, Daniela Hantuchová, Ai Sugiyama
- Seeded players out (doubles): None

=== Day three: 6 January ===
First round play was completed and second round play was started in men's singles, resulting in several upsets of seeded players. world No. 3 and top-seeded Serbian Novak Djokovic lost his first round match to Latvia's Ernests Gulbis 6–4, 6–4. Gulbis, who reached a career-high ranking of world No. 38 during 2008 that included a maiden Grand Slam quarterfinal, was rewarded with a match against Frenchman Paul-Henri Mathieu who beat Russian qualifier Teymuraz Gabashvili 6–3, 6–3. The other seeds to play their first matches were Frenchman Jo Wilfried Tsonga, who beat Argentinian Agustín Calleri, currently ranked world No. 62, 6–2, 7–5, and fifth-seeded Czech Tomáš Berdych who advanced 6–0, 6–4 to a second round match against Kei Nishikori, the Japanese player who beat U.S. player Bobby Reynolds 6–2, 6–3. Mario Ančić, Florent Serra, and Michaël Llodra all won their first round matches, against Amer Delic, Juan Carlos Ferrero, and home qualifier Joseph Sirianni. Fourth-seeded Robin Söderling and seventh-seeded Richard Gasquet won their second round matches: Gasquet defeated Taylor Dent 7–5, 6–4 while Söderling recorded a 6–3, 6–3 triumph against Julien Benneteau.

The second round started in women's singles. Second seed Victoria Azarenka took over 2 hours to win her match against Slovak-born but Australian based Jarmila Gajdošová 7–6, 7–5. The match between Tathiana Garbin and Alisa Kleybanova took 2 hours 20 minutes to complete, with the former winning 4–6, 6–4, 6–2. The fourth seed Marion Bartoli emerged victorious in a match lasting half an hour less despite taking three sets, beating qualifier Melinda Czink 5–7, 6–3, 6–1. Lucie Šafářová defeated home-favourite Samantha Stosur in the night session 6–4, 6–4 in under an hour to reach the quarterfinals. The Australian, whose ranking had dropped to outside the top 150 while she was ill with meningitis, lost despite feeling she had been hitting the ball well. Šafářová is due to play Azarenka, and Bartoli will face Garbin.

The men's doubles saw its first seeds eliminated as second seeds Marcelo Melo (defending champion with Martín García) and André Sá losing to American Travis Parrott and Filip Polášek from Slovakia. Their next opponents will be the new partnership of Briton Jamie Murray and Slovak Dušan Vemić, who defeated the Austrian pair Julian Knowle and Jürgen Melzer 6–7(14), 6–2, [10-4] (champions tiebreak). Top seeds Max Mirnyi and Andy Ram needed three sets to defeat Czechs Radek Štěpánek and Tomáš Berdych 4–6, 6–2, [11-9]. The fourth seeded pair - Czech Martin Damm and Swede Robert Lindstedt - narrowly won against the South American pairing of Argentinian Lucas Arnold Ker and Brazilian Bruno Soares 7–5, 7–5. Their next match will be against Spaniard Fernando Verdasco and German Mischa Zverev who beat Australians Brydan Klein and youngster Bernard Tomic 7–6(4), 7–6(5). Home players Carsten Ball and Chris Guccione beat Americans Mardy Fish and Sam Querrey by the same scoreline.

Five more matches took place in the women's doubles first round, with all four seeds securing victory. Top seeded South African-American duo Cara Black and Liezel Huber beat France's Séverine Brémond and Olga Govortsova 6–3, 6–3 while the second seeds, Ukrainian sisters Kateryna and Alona Bondarenko, defeated Alisa Kleybanova and Monica Niculescu 3–6, 6–4, [10-7]. Italian third seeds Victoria Azarenka and Francesca Schiavone followed up their singles successes by knocking out Tatiana Poutchek and Anastasia Rodionova 6–3, 6–2. Sun Tiantian and Yan Zi, the fourth seeded Chinese pair, beat Iveta Benešová and Yaroslava Shvedova 3–6, 7–6(12), [10-6]. In the only non-seeded match, Daniela Hantuchová and Ai Sugiyama eased through against home wildcards Monika Wejnert and Sophie Ferguson 6–2, 6–3.

- Seeded players out (singles): Novak Djokovic
- Seeded players out (doubles): Marcelo Melo/André Sá

=== Day four: 7 January ===
The biggest upset of the day was in men's singles, where Japanese Kei Nishikori defeated fifth-seeded Tomáš Berdych 7–6(7), 6–3. The other seeds won, with third-seeded Fernando Verdasco defeating Mario Ančić 6–2, 6–3; eighth-seeded Radek Štěpánek defeating defending champion Michaël Llodra 7–6(2), 6–3; and second-seeded Jo-Wilfried Tsonga overcoming a first set bagel to defeat Jarkko Nieminen 0–6, 7–6(1), 7–6(5). In other matches, Paul-Henri Mathieu defeated the player who defeated Djokovic earlier in the tournament, Ernests Gulbis, 6–3, 6–4 while Florent Serra beat Jürgen Melzer 6–4, 6–3.

Both women's seeds prevailed, with top-seeded Ana Ivanovic saving match points to defeat Roberta Vinci 6–7(4), 7–5, 6–1 and fifth-seeded Amélie Mauresmo also saving match points and needing 3 hours, 15 minutes to defeat lucky loser Julie Coin 5–7, 6–2, 7–6(11). Olga Govortsova and Sara Errani also advanced by defeating qualifier Sesil Karatantcheva and Tsvetana Pironkova, respectively.

In the men's doubles quarterfinals, the unseeded French duo and new partnership of Tsonga and Marc Gicquel upset the third-seeded team of Simon Aspelin and Pavel Vízner 7–6(1), 6–4. In the other match, Travis Parrott and Filip Polášek defeated Dušan Vemić and Jamie Murray 6–3, 6–4.

In women's doubles, the top-seeded team of Cara Black and Liezel Huber lost to Daniela Hantuchová and Ai Sugiyama 7–5, 3–6, [10–3]. The fourth-seeded team of Sun Tiantian and Yan Zi also lost to Mervana Jugić-Salkić and Peng Shuai 6–4, 3–6, [10–7]. In the remaining first round matches, Polish pair Klaudia Jans and Alicja Rosolska beat Lucie Šafářová and Galina Voskoboeva 6–1, 6–3. Jans and Rosolska then reached the semifinals by walkover when Victoria Azarenka and Francesca Schiavone, the fourth-seeded team, withdrew from their quarterfinal match. Anna-Lena Grönefeld and Vania King defeated Coin and Hungarian Melinda Czink 6–3, 6–4.

- Seeded players out (singles): Tomáš Berdych
- Seeded players out (doubles): Simon Aspelin/Pavel Visner; Cara Black/Liezel Huber; Sun Tiantian/Yan Zi;

=== Day five: 8 January ===
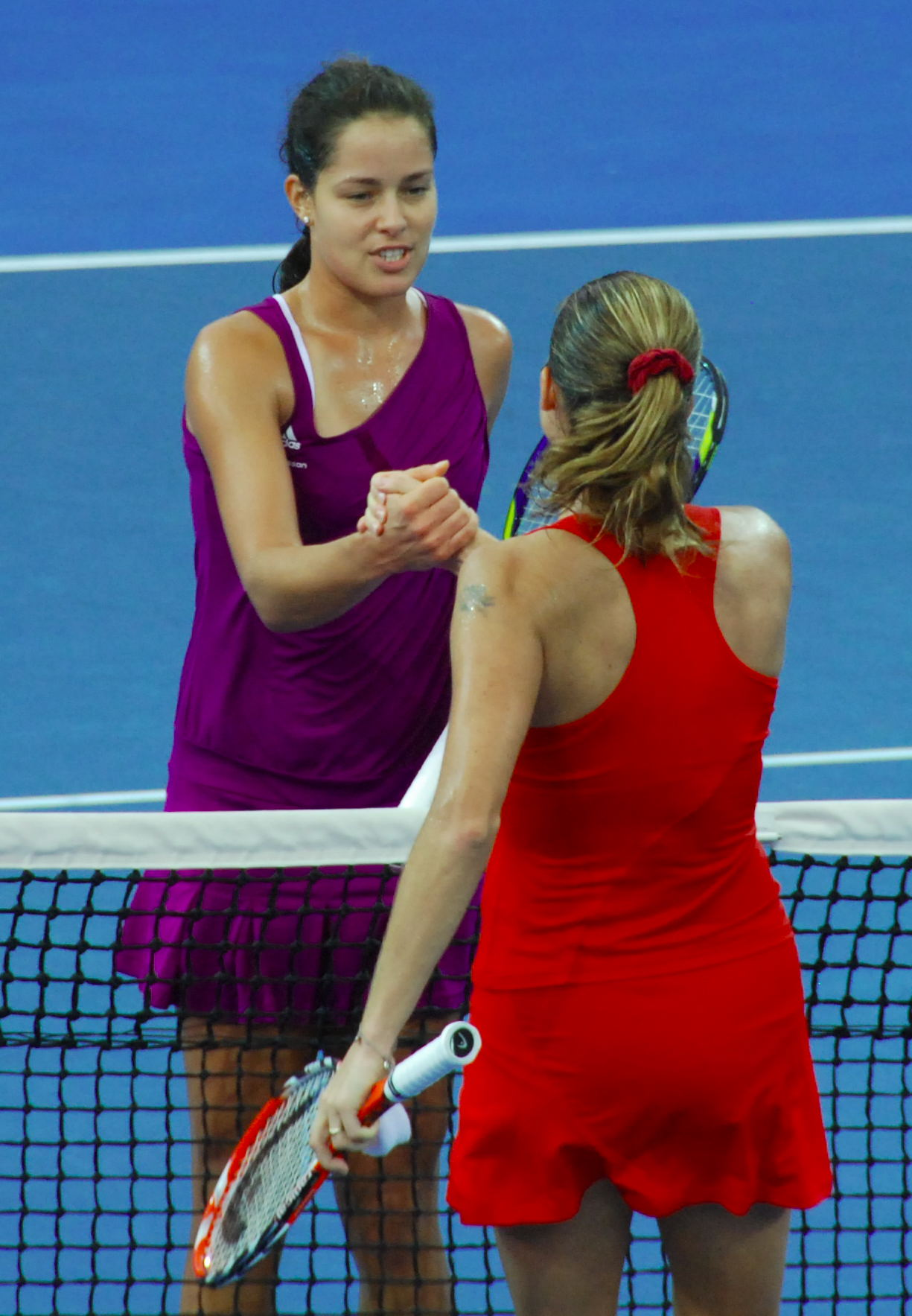
Ivanovic and Mauresmo after their match

Two of the men's singles quarterfinals were played on day five. The first saw third-seeded Fernando Verdasco defeat Florent Serra 4–6, 6–0, 6–3. Joining him in the semifinals was Paul-Henri Mathieu, who defeated Kei Nishikori 6–3, 6–4.

In women's singles, the story of the day was Amélie Mauresmo, as she routed top-seeded Ana Ivanovic 6–3, 6–2. Second-seeded Victoria Azarenka advanced with a 7–6(5), 6–4 victory over Lucie Šafářová while third-seeded Marion Bartoli defeated Tathiana Garbin 6–3, 6–3. The lone unseeded player to advance to the semifinals, Sara Errani, defeated Olga Govortsova 6–3, 6–3.

In men's doubles, home favorites Carsten Ball and Chris Guccione upset the top-seeded team of Max Mirnyi and Andy Ram, while fourth-seeded Martin Damm and Robert Lindstedt fell to Verdasco and Mischa Zverev. In women's doubles, Anna-Lena Grönefeld and Vania King defeated the second-seeded team of Alona Bondarenko and Kateryna Bondarenko 6–1, 6–3, while Klaudia Jans and Alicja Rosolska advanced to the final with a 6–3, 6–4 victory over Daniela Hantuchová and Ai Sugiyama.

- Seeded players out (singles): Ana Ivanovic
- Seeded players out (doubles): Max Mirnyi/Andy Ram, Martin Damm/Robert Lindstedt; Alona Bondarenko/Kateryna Bondarenko

=== Day six: 9 January ===
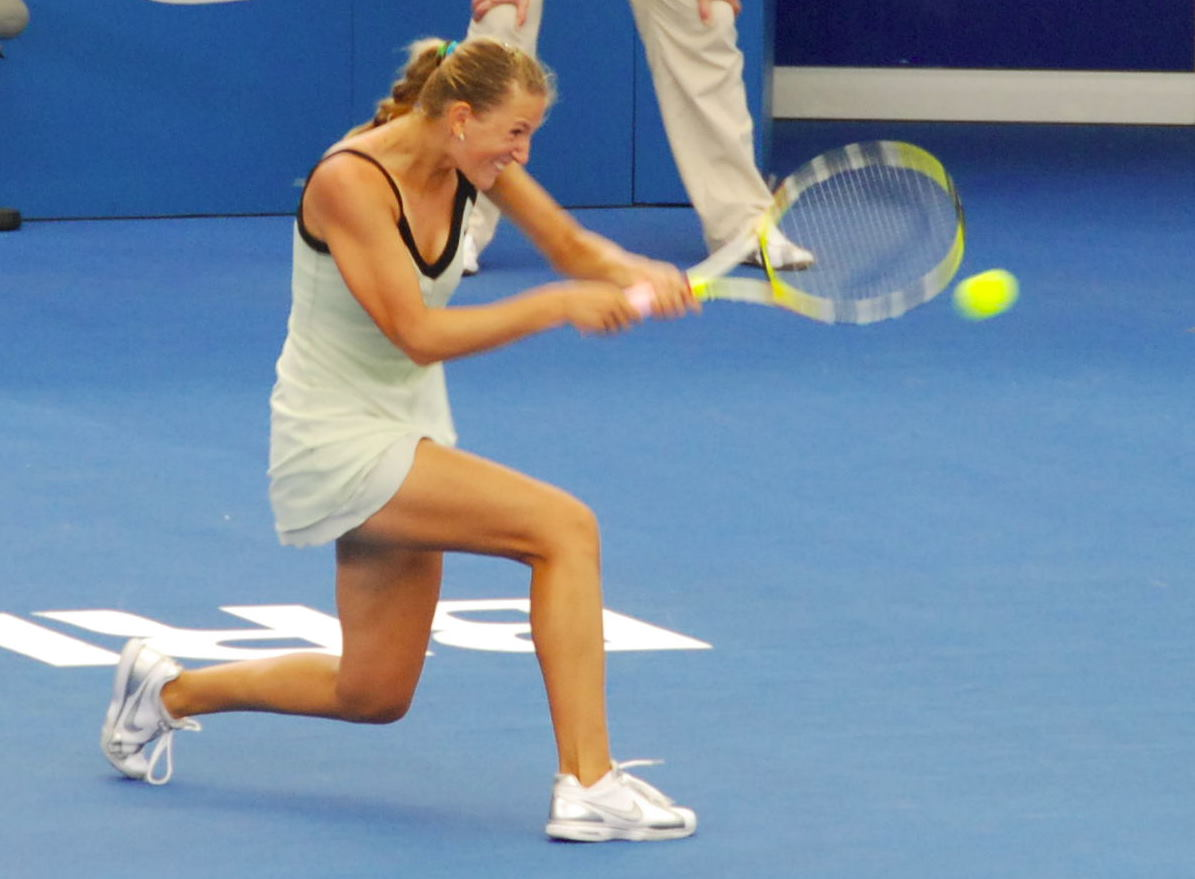
Victoria Azarenka

The last two quarterfinals in men's singles were played, with Radek Štěpánek coming back from a set down to defeat fourth-seeded Robin Söderling 2–6, 6–4, 6–3. After losing the first set, Štěpánek recovered to pull ahead 3–0 in the second set with an early break, taking the set and then establishing a 5–3 lead in the decider. His semifinal opponent will be seventh-seeded Frenchman Richard Gasquet who defeated second-seeded compatriot Jo-Wilfried Tsonga 1–6, 6–4, 6–2 despite Tsonga's eight aces and Gasquet's four double faults.

In the women's singles semifinals, Amélie Mauresmo retired from her match with Marion Bartoli after just four games because of a thigh injury. Despite the retirement, she was expected to be fit for the Australian Open starting two weeks later. Bartoli will next play Victoria Azarenka, a 6–3, 6–1 victor over Sara Errani.

- Seeded players out (singles): Jo-Wilfried Tsonga, Robin Söderling; Amélie Mauresmo (retirement)
- Seeded players out (doubles): None

=== Day seven: 10 January ===
The men's semifinals were played, with third-seeded Fernando Verdasco defeating Frenchman Paul-Henri Mathieu 6–2, 6–1. Verdasco was broken at the beginning of the match to fall behind 2–0 but then won six straight games to take the first set. In the second semifinal, eighth-seeded Richard Gasquet struggled in the first three games of the first set, giving Radek Štěpánek an early break. Gasquet was able to break back immediately and broke twice more to take the first set. Gasquet's errors allowed Štěpánek to win the second set, breaking Gasquet twice. In the third set, Štěpánek broke Gasquet's serve twice while losing his own serve only once to win the match 2–6, 6–2, 6–4.

Verdasco's success at the tournament continued in the men's doubles semifinals. He and partner Mischa Zverev defeated home pair Carsten Ball and Chris Guccione 6–2, 6–4 to reach the final. Their opponents will be Marc Gicquel and Jo-Wilfried Tsonga, the all-French pair, who overcame Travis Parrott and Filip Polášek 7–5, 6–7(4), [10–7].

Victoria Azarenka, a new top-20 player from Belarus, claimed her maiden Women's Tennis Association Tour title with a 6–3, 6–1 victory over third-seeded Frenchwoman Marion Bartoli. The 19-year-old won the tournament without losing a set. After falling behind 4–1 and two breaks of serve in the first set, Bartoli fought back to 4–3. Azarenka then won six consecutive games to take the set and lead 4–0 in the second before closing out the match in 29 minutes.

With no seeds left in the women's doubles, Anna-Lena Grönefeld and Vania King overcame a first set loss to defeat Klaudia Jans and Alicja Rosolska 3–6, 7–5, [10–5],

- Seeded players out (singles): Paul-Henri Mathieu, Richard Gasquet; Marion Bartoli
- Seeded players out (doubles): None

=== Day eight: 11 January ===
Czech Radek Štěpánek won the men's singles title, defeating third-seeded Fernando Verdasco from Spain 3–6, 6–3, 6–4. This was Štěpánek's third singles title on the Association of Tennis Professionals tour after Rotterdam in 2006 and Los Angeles in 2007. Štěpánek led 4–1 in the third set with a double break before Verdasco broke back to trail 4–3.

Verdasco also was involved in the doubles final. Partnering Mischa Zverev for the first time, they lost to fellow new team Marc Gicquel and Jo-Wilfried Tsonga 6–3, 6–4.

- Seeded players out (singles): Fernando Verdasco
- Seeded players out (doubles): None

== Finals ==
=== Men's singles ===
(Czech Republic) Radek Štěpánek defeated (Spain) Fernando Verdasco, 3–6, 6–3, 6–4

- It was Štěpánek's first title of the year and 3rd of his career.

=== Women's singles ===
(Belarus) Victoria Azarenka defeated (France) Marion Bartoli, 6–3, 6–1

- It was Azarenka's first career title.

=== Men's doubles ===
(France) Marc Gicquel / (France) Jo-Wilfried Tsonga defeated (Spain) Fernando Verdasco / (Germany) Mischa Zverev 6–4, 6–3

=== Women's doubles ===
(Germany) Anna-Lena Grönefeld / (United States) Vania King defeated (Poland) Klaudia Jans / (Poland) Alicja Rosolska, 3–6, 7–5, [10–5]
