= 2009 Brisbane International – Women's singles =

Coordinates: 27°31′30″S 153°0′26″E

Women's singles
- 2009 Brisbane International

Final
- Champion: (Belarus) Victoria Azarenka
- Runner-up: (France) Marion Bartoli
- Score: 6–3, 6–1

Details
- Draw: 32 (3WC/4Q/1LL)
- Seeds: 8

Events
Singles	men	women
Doubles	men	women
- Brisbane International

This was the first edition of the event.

Victoria Azarenka won the title, defeating Marion Bartoli in the final 6–3, 6–1.

== Seeds ==
1. (Serbia) Ana Ivanovic (quarterfinals)
2. (Belarus) Victoria Azarenka (champion)
3. (France) Marion Bartoli (final)
4. (Slovakia) Daniela Hantuchová (first round)
5. (France) Amélie Mauresmo (semifinals, retired due to a left thigh strain)
6. (Estonia) Kaia Kanepi (first round)
7. (Russia) Maria Kirilenko (withdrew due to viral illness)
8. (Italy) Francesca Schiavone (first round)
9. (Japan) Ai Sugiyama (first round)

== Draw ==
Key

- Q = Qualifier
- WC = Wild card
- LL = Lucky loser
- Alt = Alternate
- ITF = ITF entry
- PR = Protected ranking
- SR = Special ranking
- SE = Special exempt
- JE = Junior exempt
- JR = Junior Accelerator Programme entrant
- CO = College Accelerator Programme entrant
- NG = Next Gen Accelerator Program entrant
- w/o = Walkover
- r = Retired
- d = Defaulted

=== Finals ===
Semifinals
5	(France) Amélie Mauresmo	0^{r}
3	(France) Marion Bartoli	4
(Italy) Sara Errani	3	1
2	(Belarus) Victoria Azarenka	6	6

Final
3	(France) Marion Bartoli	3	1
2	(Belarus) Victoria Azarenka	6	6

=== Top half ===
First round
1	(Serbia) A Ivanovic	6	6
(Czech Republic) P Kvitová	4	2
Q	(Germany) A-L Grönefeld	6	3	1
Q	(Italy) R Vinci	0	6	6
LL	(France) J Coin	7	6^{5}	7
(Belgium) Y Wickmayer	5	7	6^{3}
WC	(Australia) J Dokić	6^{9}	6^{5}
5	(France) A Mauresmo	7	7
3	(France) M Bartoli	6	6
WC	(Australia) M Wejnert	1	2
Q	(Hungary) M Czink	7	6
(Ukraine) A Bondarenko	6^{3}	1
(Italy) T Garbin	6	6
(Sweden) S Arvidsson	2	3
(Russia) A Kleybanova	6	6
6	(Estonia) K Kanepi	1	4

Second round
1	(Serbia) A Ivanovic	6^{4}	7	6
Q	(Italy) R Vinci	7	5	1
LL	(France) J Coin	7	2	6^{11}
5	(France) A Mauresmo	5	6	7
3	(France) M Bartoli	5	6	6
Q	(Hungary) M Czink	7	3	1
(Italy) T Garbin	4	6	6
(Russia) A Kleybanova	6	4	2

Quarterfinals
1	(Serbia) A Ivanovic	3	2
5	(France) A Mauresmo	6	6
3	(France) M Bartoli	6	6
(Italy) T Garbin	3	3

Semifinals
5	(France) A Mauresmo	0^{r}
3	(France) M Bartoli	4

=== Bottom half ===
First round
8	(Italy) F Schiavone	5	2
(Belarus) O Govortsova	7	6
(Czech Republic) I Benešová	6	4	2
Q	(Bulgaria) S Karatantcheva	1	6	6
(Bulgaria) T Pironkova	6^{2}	6	6
(Romania) M Niculescu	7	4	4
(Italy) S Errani	6^{1}	6	6
4	(Slovakia) D Hantuchová	7	4	0
9	(Japan) A Sugiyama	2	3
(Australia) S Stosur	6	6
WC	(Australia) I Holland	4	3
(Czech Republic) L Šafářová	6	6
(China) S Peng	4	2
(Slovakia) J Gajdošová	6	6
(Ukraine) K Bondarenko	0	2
2	(Belarus) V Azarenka	6	6

Second round
(Belarus) O Govortsova	6	5	7
Q	(Bulgaria) S Karatantcheva	0	7	5
(Bulgaria) T Pironkova	7	5	3
(Italy) S Errani	6^{3}	7	6
(Australia) S Stosur	4	4
(Czech Republic) L Šafářová	6	6
(Slovakia) J Gajdošová	6^{4}	5
2	(Belarus) V Azarenka	7	7

Quarterfinals
(Belarus) O Govortsova	3	3
(Italy) S Errani	6	6
(Czech Republic) L Šafářová	6^{5}	4
2	(Belarus) V Azarenka	7	6

Semifinals
(Italy) S Errani	3	1
2	(Belarus) V Azarenka	6	6

== Qualifying ==
=== Seeds ===
1. (Germany) Anna-Lena Grönefeld (qualified)
2. (Italy) Karin Knapp (first round)
3. (Uzbekistan) Akgul Amanmuradova (first round)
4. (Italy) Roberta Vinci (qualified)
5. (France) Camille Pin (first round)
6. (Kazakhstan) Yaroslava Shvedova (first round)
7. (Kazakhstan) Galina Voskoboeva (first round)
8. (Paraguay) Rossana de los Ríos (second round)

=== Qualifiers ===
1. (Germany) Anna-Lena Grönefeld
2. (Bulgaria) Sesil Karatantcheva
3. (Hungary) Melinda Czink
4. (Italy) Roberta Vinci

=== Lucky loser ===
1. (France) Julie Coin

=== Qualifying draw ===
==== First qualifier ====
First round
1	(Germany) Anna-Lena Grönefeld	6	6
(Ukraine) Viktoriya Kutuzova	1	4
(Germany) Julia Görges	6	6
WC	(Australia) Emelyn Starr	4	3
(United Kingdom) Melanie South	3	4
(Russia) Ekaterina Bychkova	6	6
(France) Julie Coin	6	6
8	(Kazakhstan) Yaroslava Shvedova	3	4

Second round
1	(Germany) Anna-Lena Grönefeld	6	6^{3}	7^{7}
(Germany) Julia Görges	3	7^{7}	6^{4}
(Russia) Ekaterina Bychkova	2	6^{2}
(France) Julie Coin	6	7^{7}

Qualifying competition
1	(Germany) Anna-Lena Grönefeld	2	6	6
(France) Julie Coin	6	4	4

==== Second qualifier ====
First round
2	(Italy) Karin Knapp	4	0
(Russia) Evgeniya Rodina	6	6
(France) Séverine Brémond	6	2	1
(Colombia) Catalina Castaño	2	6	6
(Germany) Julia Schruff	4	6	4
(Bulgaria) Sesil Karatantcheva	6	0	6
(United States) Vania King	2	7	7
5	(France) Camille Pin	6	5	5

Second round
(Russia) Evgeniya Rodina	6	6
(Colombia) Catalina Castaño	4	2
(Bulgaria) Sesil Karatantcheva	6	7
(United States) Vania King	3	5

Qualifying competition
(Russia) Evgeniya Rodina	1	6^{4}
(Bulgaria) Sesil Karatantcheva	6	7^{7}

==== Third qualifier ====
First round
3	(Uzbekistan) Akgul Amanmuradova	1	2
(Hungary) Melinda Czink	6	6
WC	(Australia) Sophie Ferguson	4	7^{7}	6
(Russia) Anastasia Rodionova	6	6^{1}	4
(China) Yan Zi	6	6
WC	(Australia) Monique Adamczak	4	3
WC	(Australia) Marija Mirkovic	2	2
8	(Paraguay) Rossana de los Ríos	6	6

Second round
(Hungary) Melinda Czink	6	6
WC	(Australia) Sophie Ferguson	4	2
(China) Yan Zi	6	6
8	(Paraguay) Rossana de los Ríos	1	4

Qualifying competition
(Hungary) Melinda Czink	6	4	7
(China) Yan Zi	4	6	5

==== Fourth qualifier ====
First round
4	(Italy) Roberta Vinci	6	6
(Australia) Jessica Moore	2	0
(Croatia) Jelena Pandžić	5	1
(Ukraine) Yuliana Fedak	7	6
(Colombia) Mariana Duque Mariño	6^{2}	3
(China) Yuan Meng	7^{7}	6
(Croatia) Karolina Šprem	6	6
7	(Kazakhstan) Galina Voskoboeva	4	3

Second round
4	(Italy) Roberta Vinci	6	6
(Ukraine) Yuliana Fedak	4	3
(China) Yuan Meng	6	2	4
(Croatia) Karolina Šprem	3	6	6

Qualifying competition
4	(Italy) Roberta Vinci	3	6	6
(Croatia) Karolina Šprem	6	3	2
