= 2009 Brisbane International – Women's doubles =

Coordinates: 27°31′30″S 153°0′26″E

Women's doubles
- 2009 Brisbane International

Final
- Champions: (Germany) Anna-Lena Grönefeld (United States) Vania King
- Runners-up: (Poland) Klaudia Jans (Poland) Alicja Rosolska
- Score: 3–6, 7–5, [10–5]

Details
- Draw: 16 (1WC/1Alt)
- Seeds: 4

Events
Singles	men	women
Doubles	men	women
- Brisbane International

Dinara Safina and Ágnes Szávay were the defending champions, but chose not to participate that year.

Anna-Lena Grönefeld and Vania King won in the final, 3–6, 7–5, [10–5], over Klaudia Jans and Alicja Rosolska.

== Seeds ==
1. (Zimbabwe) Cara Black / (United States) Liezel Huber (quarterfinals)
2. (Ukraine) Alona Bondarenko / (Ukraine) Kateryna Bondarenko (quarterfinals)
3. (Belarus) Victoria Azarenka / (Italy) Francesca Schiavone (quarterfinals, withdrew)
4. (China) Sun Tiantian / (China) Yan Zi (quarterfinals)

== Draw ==
Key

- Q = Qualifier
- WC = Wild card
- LL = Lucky loser
- Alt = Alternate
- ITF = ITF entry
- PR = Protected ranking
- SR = Special ranking
- SE = Special exempt
- JE = Junior exempt
- JR = Junior Accelerator Programme entrant
- CO = College Accelerator Programme entrant
- NG = Next Gen Accelerator Program entrant
- w/o = Walkover
- r = Retired
- d = Defaulted

=== Draw ===
First round
1	(Zimbabwe) C Black (United States) L Huber	6	6
(France) S Brémond (Belarus) O Govortsova	3	3
WC	(Australia) S Ferguson (Australia) M Wejnert	2	3
(Slovakia) D Hantuchová (Japan) A Sugiyama	6	6
3	(Belarus) V Azarenka (Italy) F Schiavone	6	6
(Belarus) T Poutchek (Russia) A Rodionova	3	2
(Poland) K Jans (Poland) A Rosolska	6	6
(Czech Republic) L Šafářová (Kazakhstan) G Voskoboeva	1	3
(Bosnia and Herzegovina) M Jugić-Salkić (China) S Peng	6	6
(Uzbekistan) A Amanmuradova (Ukraine) Y Fedak	1	4
(Czech Republic) I Benešová (Kazakhstan) Y Shvedova	6	6^{12}	[6]
4	(China) T Sun (China) Z Yan	3	7	[10]
(Germany) A-L Grönefeld (United States) V King	6	6
Alt	(France) J Coin (Hungary) M Czink	3	4
(Russia) A Kleybanova (Romania) M Niculescu	6	4	[7]
2	(Ukraine) A Bondarenko (Ukraine) K Bondarenko	3	6	[10]

Quarterfinals
1	(Zimbabwe) C Black (United States) L Huber	5	6	[3]
(Slovakia) D Hantuchová (Japan) A Sugiyama	7	3	[10]
3	(Belarus) V Azarenka (Italy) F Schiavone
(Poland) K Jans (Poland) A Rosolska	w/o
(Bosnia and Herzegovina) M Jugić-Salkić (China) S Peng	6	3	[10]
4	(China) T Sun (China) Z Yan	4	6	[7]
(Germany) A-L Grönefeld (United States) V King	6	6
2	(Ukraine) A Bondarenko (Ukraine) K Bondarenko	1	3

Semifinals
(Slovakia) D Hantuchová (Japan) A Sugiyama	3	4
(Poland) K Jans (Poland) A Rosolska	6	6
(Bosnia and Herzegovina) M Jugić-Salkić (China) S Peng
(Germany) A-L Grönefeld (United States) V King	w/o

Final
(Poland) K Jans (Poland) A Rosolska	6	5	[5]
(Germany) A-L Grönefeld (United States) V King	3	7	[10]
