= 2025 Brisbane International =

Tennis tournament

- Date: 29 December 2024–5 January 2025
- Edition: 14th
- Category: ATP Tour 250 series WTA 500 series
- Draw: 32S / 24D / 24Q (ATP); 48S / 16D / 24Q (WTA)
- Prize money: $680,140 (ATP) $1,520,600 (WTA)
- Surface: Hard
- Location: Tennyson, Brisbane, Queensland, Australia
- Venue: Queensland Tennis Centre

Champions

Men's singles
- (Czech Republic) Jiří Lehečka

Women's singles
- Aryna Sabalenka

Men's doubles
- (United Kingdom) Julian Cash / (United Kingdom) Lloyd Glasspool

Women's doubles
- Mirra Andreeva / Diana Shnaider
← 2024 ·	Brisbane International	· 2026 →

The 2025 Brisbane International is a professional tennis tournament on the 2025 ATP Tour and 2025 WTA Tour. It is played on outdoor hard courts in Brisbane, Queensland, Australia. This is the fourteenth edition of the tournament and will take place at the Queensland Tennis Centre in Tennyson as part of the Australian Open Series in preparation for the first Grand Slam of the year.

== Finals ==
=== Men's singles ===
- (Czech Republic) Jiří Lehečka defeated (United States) Reilly Opelka 4–1 ret.

=== Women's singles ===
- Aryna Sabalenka defeated Polina Kudermetova 4–6, 6–3, 6–2

=== Men's doubles ===
- (United Kingdom) Julian Cash / (United Kingdom) Lloyd Glasspool defeated (Czech Republic) Jiří Lehečka / (Czech Republic) Jakub Menšík 6–3, 6–7^{(2–7)}, [10–6]

=== Women's doubles ===
- Mirra Andreeva / Diana Shnaider defeated (Australia) Priscilla Hon / Anna Kalinskaya 7–6^{(8–6)}, 7–5

== Point and prize money distribution ==
=== Points distribution ===
Event	W	F	SF	QF	R16	R32	R64	Q	Q2	Q1
Men's singles	250	165	100	50	25	0	—	13	7	0
Men's doubles	250	150	90	45	20	0	—	—	—	—
Women's singles	500	325	195	108	60	32	1	25	13	1
Women's doubles	500	325	195	108	60	1	—	—	—	—

=== Prize money ===
The Brisbane International total prize money for the ATP event is $680,140, a 2.8% increase from 2024. The total prize money for the WTA event is significantly larger at $1,520,600, albeit a decrease of -12.45% from 2024.

Event	W	F	SF	QF	R16	R32	R64	Q2	Q1
Men's Singles	$96,985	$56,580	$33,055	$18,685	$10,955	$6,580	N/A	$3,480	$1,865
Men's Doubles*	$35,570	$18,510	$9,770	$5,450	$2,980	$1,660	N/A	N/A	N/A
Women's Singles	$192,475	$120,735	$69,650	$35,000	$17,750	$12,300	$10,660	$8,900	$4,585
Women's Doubles*	$75,820	$48,590	$26,830	$14,000	$9,530	N/A	N/A	N/A	N/A

* per team

== ATP singles main-draw entrants ==
=== Seeds ===
Country	Player	Rank^{1}	Seed
SRB	Novak Djokovic	7	1
BUL	Grigor Dimitrov	10	2
DEN	Holger Rune	13	3
USA	Frances Tiafoe	18	4
~~USA~~	~~Sebastian Korda~~	~~22~~	~~5~~
CHI	Alejandro Tabilo	23	6
AUS	Alexei Popyrin	24	7
AUS	Jordan Thompson	26	8

- ^{1} Rankings are as of 23 December 2024.

=== Other entrants ===
The following players received wildcards into the singles main draw:

- (Australia) Rinky Hijikata
- (Australia) Aleksandar Vukic
- (Australia) Adam Walton

The following players received entry using a protected ranking into the main draw:

- (Australia) Nick Kyrgios
- (United States) Reilly Opelka

The following players received entry from the qualifying draw:

- (United States) Nishesh Basavareddy
- (France) Benjamin Bonzi
- (Argentina) Federico Agustín Gómez
- (Germany) Yannick Hanfmann
- (Kazakhstan) Mikhail Kukushkin
- (Japan) Yoshihito Nishioka

The following player received entry as a lucky loser:

- (Serbia) Dušan Lajović

=== Withdrawals ===
- (Argentina) Sebastián Báez → replaced by (France) Arthur Cazaux
- (United States) Marcos Giron → replaced by (France) Arthur Rinderknech
- (Australia) Thanasi Kokkinakis → replaced by (Australia) Christopher O'Connell
- (United States) Sebastian Korda → replaced by (Serbia) Dušan Lajović

== ATP doubles main-draw entrants ==
=== Seeds ===
Country	Player	Country	Player	Rank^{1}	Seed
CRO	Nikola Mektić	NZL	Michael Venus	23	1
FIN	Harri Heliövaara	GBR	Henry Patten	30	2
USA	Nathaniel Lammons	USA	Jackson Withrow	38	3
~~GBR~~	~~Joe Salisbury~~	~~GBR~~	~~Neal Skupski~~	~~51~~	~~4~~
GBR	Julian Cash	GBR	Lloyd Glasspool	60	5
GBR	Jamie Murray	AUS	John Peers	62	6
USA	Austin Krajicek	USA	Rajeev Ram	73	7
COL	Nicolás Barrientos	BEL	Sander Gillé	80	8

- ^{1} Rankings are as of 23 December 2024.

=== Other entrants ===
The following pairs received wildcards into the doubles main draw:

- (Serbia) Novak Djokovic / (Australia) Nick Kyrgios
- (Australia) Christopher O'Connell / (Australia) Jordan Thompson

The following pairs received entry into the doubles main draw as alternates:

- (Australia) Rinky Hijikata / (Australia) Jason Kubler
- (Australia) Tristan Schoolkate / (Australia) Adam Walton

=== Withdrawals ===
- (Bulgaria) Grigor Dimitrov / (United States) Sebastian Korda → replaced by (Australia) Tristan Schoolkate / (Australia) Adam Walton
- (United Kingdom) Joe Salisbury / (United Kingdom) Neal Skupski → replaced by (Australia) Rinky Hijikata / (Australia) Jason Kubler

== WTA singles main-draw entrants ==
=== Seeds ===
Country	Player	Rank^{1}	Seed
	Aryna Sabalenka	1	1
USA	Emma Navarro	8	2
	Daria Kasatkina	9	3
ESP	Paula Badosa	12	4
	Diana Shnaider	13	5
	Anna Kalinskaya	14	6
LAT	Jeļena Ostapenko	15	7
	Mirra Andreeva	16	8
UKR	Marta Kostyuk	18	9
	Victoria Azarenka	20	10
POL	Magdalena Fręch	25	11
CZE	Linda Nosková	26	12
	Liudmila Samsonova	27	13
	Ekaterina Alexandrova	28	14
KAZ	Yulia Putintseva	29	15
UKR	Dayana Yastremska	33	16

- ^{1} Rankings are as of 23 December 2024.

=== Other entrants ===
The following players received wildcards into the singles main draw:

- (Australia) Kimberly Birrell
- (Australia) Talia Gibson
- (Australia) Maya Joint

The following player received entry using a protected ranking into the main draw:

- (China) Zheng Saisai

The following players received entry from the qualifying draw:

- (Czech Republic) Sára Bejlek
- (Romania) Ana Bogdan
- (Australia) Priscilla Hon
- (Australia) Maddison Inglis
- Polina Kudermetova
- (Romania) Anca Todoni

=== Withdrawals ===
- (United States) Jessica Pegula → replaced by (Netherlands) Suzan Lamens

== WTA doubles main-draw entrants ==
=== Seeds ===
Country	Player	Country	Player	Rank^{1}	Seed
TPE	Chan Hao-ching	UKR	Lyudmyla Kichenok	20	1
KAZ	Anna Danilina		Irina Khromacheva	40	2
UKR	Marta Kostyuk	LAT	Jeļena Ostapenko	66	3
CHN	Guo Hanyu		Alexandra Panova	66	4

- ^{1} Rankings are as of 23 December 2024.

=== Other entrants ===
The following pairs received wildcards into the doubles main draw:

- (Australia) Talia Gibson / (Australia) Maya Joint
- (Australia) Priscilla Hon / Anna Kalinskaya

The following pair received entry using a protected ranking:

- (China) Xu Yifan / (China) Yang Zhaoxuan
