= 2025 Brisbane International – Women's doubles =

Women's doubles
- 2025 Brisbane International

Final
- Champions: Mirra Andreeva; Diana Shnaider
- Runners-up: (Australia) Priscilla Hon; Anna Kalinskaya
- Score: 7–6^{(8–6)}, 7–5

Details
- Draw: 16 (2 WC )
- Seeds: 8

Events
Singles	men	women
Doubles	men	women
- Brisbane International

Mirra Andreeva and Diana Shnaider defeated Priscilla Hon and Anna Kalinskaya in the final, 7–6^{(8–6)}, 7–5 to win the women's doubles tennis title at the 2025 Brisbane International. It was the first WTA Tour doubles title for both players.

Lyudmyla Kichenok and Jeļena Ostapenko were the defending champions, but chose to compete with different partners. Kichenok partnered Chan Hao-ching, but they lost in the quarterfinals to Hon and Kalinskaya. Ostapenko partnered Marta Kostyuk, but they lost in the first round to Tímea Babos and Nicole Melichar-Martinez.

== Seeds ==
1. (Chinese Taipei) Chan Hao-ching / (Ukraine) Lyudmyla Kichenok (quarterfinals)
2. (Kazakhstan) Anna Danilina / Irina Khromacheva (quarterfinals)
3. (Ukraine) Marta Kostyuk / (Latvia) Jeļena Ostapenko (first round)
4. (China) Guo Hanyu / Alexandra Panova (first round)

== Draw ==
Key

- Q = Qualifier
- WC = Wild card
- LL = Lucky loser
- Alt = Alternate
- ITF = ITF entry
- PR = Protected ranking
- SR = Special ranking
- SE = Special exempt
- JE = Junior exempt
- JR = Junior Accelerator Programme entrant
- CO = College Accelerator Programme entrant
- NG = Next Gen Accelerator Program entrant
- w/o = Walkover
- r = Retired
- d = Defaulted

First round
1	(Chinese Taipei) H-c Chan (Ukraine) L Kichenok	2	7^{9}	[10]
WC	(Australia) T Gibson (Australia) M Joint	6	6^{7}	[8]
(Japan) M Kato (Mexico) G Olmos	4	2
WC	(Australia) P Hon; A Kalinskaya	6	6
3	(Ukraine) M Kostyuk (Latvia) J Ostapenko	2	3
(Hungary) T Babos (United States) N Melichar-Martinez	6	6
V Kudermetova; A Potapova	2	4
PR	(China) Y Xu (China) Z Yang	6	6
(Ukraine) N Kichenok (Spain) S Sorribes Tormo	6	2	[5]
M Andreeva; D Shnaider	2	6	[10]
(Spain) P Badosa (Tunisia) O Jabeur	6	5	[10]
4	(China) H Guo; A Panova	4	7	[8]
(Czech Republic) M Bouzková (United States) B Mattek-Sands	6	1	[7]
(Japan) S Aoyama (Japan) E Hozumi	3	6	[10]
(Spain) C Bucșa; Y Sizikova	3	3
2	(Kazakhstan) A Danilina; I Khromacheva	6	6

Quarterfinals
1	(Chinese Taipei) H-c Chan (Ukraine) L Kichenok	6^{4}	2
WC	(Australia) P Hon; A Kalinskaya	7^{7}	6
(Hungary) T Babos (United States) N Melichar-Martinez	6	6
PR	(China) Y Xu (China) Z Yang	1	4
M Andreeva; D Shnaider	6	6
(Spain) P Badosa (Tunisia) O Jabeur	2	3
(Japan) S Aoyama (Japan) E Hozumi	6	6
2	(Kazakhstan) A Danilina; I Khromacheva	0	4

Semifinals
WC	(Australia) P Hon; A Kalinskaya	6	7
(Hungary) T Babos (United States) N Melichar-Martinez	1	5
M Andreeva; D Shnaider	7	6
(Japan) S Aoyama (Japan) E Hozumi	5	2

Final
WC	(Australia) P Hon; A Kalinskaya	6^{6}	5
M Andreeva; D Shnaider	7^{8}	7
