= 2025 Brisbane International – Women's singles =

Women's singles
- 2025 Brisbane International

Final
- Champion: Aryna Sabalenka
- Runner-up: Polina Kudermetova
- Score: 4–6, 6–3, 6–2

Details
- Draw: 48 (6 Q / 4 WC )
- Seeds: 16

Events
| Singles | men | women |
| Doubles | men | women |
- Brisbane International

Aryna Sabalenka defeated Polina Kudermetova in the final, 4–6, 6–3, 6–2 to win the women's singles tennis title at the 2025 Brisbane International. It was her 18th career WTA Tour singles title.

Elena Rybakina was the reigning champion, but chose to compete at the United Cup instead.

== Seeds ==
All seeds received a bye into the second round.

1. Aryna Sabalenka (champion)
2. (United States) Emma Navarro (second round)
3. Daria Kasatkina (third round)
4. (Spain) Paula Badosa (second round)
5. Diana Shnaider (second round)
6. Anna Kalinskaya (second round)
7. (Latvia) Jeļena Ostapenko (second round)
8. Mirra Andreeva (semifinals)
9. (Ukraine) Marta Kostyuk (second round)
10. Victoria Azarenka (third round)
11. (Poland) Magdalena Fręch (second round)
12. (Czech Republic) Linda Nosková (third round)
13. Liudmila Samsonova (second round)
14. Ekaterina Alexandrova (second round)
15. (Kazakhstan) Yulia Putintseva (third round)
16. (Ukraine) Dayana Yastremska (second round)

Click on the seed number of a player to go to their draw section.

== Draw ==
Key

- Q = Qualifier
- WC = Wild card
- LL = Lucky loser
- Alt = Alternate
- ITF = ITF entry
- PR = Protected ranking
- SR = Special ranking
- SE = Special exempt
- JE = Junior exempt
- JR = Junior Accelerator Programme entrant
- CO = College Accelerator Programme entrant
- NG = Next Gen Accelerator Program entrant
- w/o = Walkover
- r = Retired
- d = Defaulted

=== Finals ===
Quarterfinals
1 | Aryna Sabalenka | 6 | 6
(Czech Republic) Marie Bouzková | 3 | 4
(Tunisia) Ons Jabeur | 4 | 6^{2}
8 | Mirra Andreeva | 6 | 7^{7}
(United States) Ashlyn Krueger | 6^{5} | 3
Q | Polina Kudermetova | 7^{7} | 6
(Ukraine) Anhelina Kalinina | 4 | 6 | 7
WC | (Australia) Kimberly Birrell | 6 | 1 | 5

Semifinals
1 | Aryna Sabalenka | 6 | 6
8 | Mirra Andreeva | 3 | 2
Q | Polina Kudermetova | 6 | 6
(Ukraine) Anhelina Kalinina | 4 | 3

Final
1 | Aryna Sabalenka | 4 | 6 | 6
Q | Polina Kudermetova | 6 | 3 | 2

=== Top half ===
==== Section 1 ====
First round
(Bulgaria) V Tomova | 0 | 3
(Mexico) R Zarazúa | 6 | 6
(Poland) M Linette | 4 | 4
(United States) M Kessler | 6 | 6
Q | (Australia) M Inglis | 3 | 4
WC | (Australia) M Joint | 6 | 6
(Czech Republic) M Bouzková | 7^{7} | 3 | 6
WC | (Australia) T Gibson | 6^{5} | 6 | 3

Second round
1 | A Sabalenka | 6 | 6
(Mexico) R Zarazúa | 4 | 0
(United States) M Kessler | 2 | 5
15 | (Kazakhstan) Y Putintseva | 6 | 7
10 | V Azarenka | 6^{5} | 6 | 6
WC | (Australia) M Joint | 7^{7} | 2 | 4
(Czech Republic) M Bouzková | 7^{7} | 6
7 | (Latvia) J Ostapenko | 6^{0} | 4

Third round
1 | A Sabalenka | 7^{7} | 6
15 | (Kazakhstan) Y Putintseva | 6^{2} | 4
10 | V Azarenka | 4 | 4
(Czech Republic) M Bouzková | 6 | 6

Quarterfinals
1 | A Sabalenka | 6 | 6
(Czech Republic) M Bouzková | 3 | 4

==== Section 2 ====
First round
(Armenia) E Avanesyan | 1 | 6 | 6
(Slovakia) R Šramková | 6 | 2 | 2
(Tunisia) O Jabeur | 7^{7} | 6
PR | (China) S Zheng | 6^{5} | 4
Q | (Romania) A Todoni | 7^{7} | 6
(Spain) C Bucșa | 6^{3} | 2
A Blinkova | 6 | 7^{7}
Q | (Czech Republic) S Bejlek | 1 | 6^{5}

Second round
4 | (Spain) P Badosa | 3 | 6 | 2
(Armenia) E Avanesyan | 6 | 1 | 6
(Tunisia) O Jabeur | 6 | 6
14 | E Alexandrova | 3 | 2
12 | (Czech Republic) L Nosková | 6 | 6
Q | (Romania) A Todoni | 1 | 4
A Blinkova | 4 | 4
8 | M Andreeva | 6 | 6

Third round
(Armenia) E Avanesyan | 4 | 6 | 4
(Tunisia) O Jabeur | 6 | 1 | 6
12 | (Czech Republic) L Nosková | 3 | 0
8 | M Andreeva | 6 | 6

Quarterfinals
(Tunisia) O Jabeur | 4 | 6^{2}
8 | M Andreeva | 6 | 7^{7}

=== Bottom half ===
==== Section 3 ====
First round
(United States) A Krueger | 6 | 1 | 6
(Japan) M Uchijima | 3 | 6 | 3
K Rakhimova | 2 | 4
(Netherlands) S Lamens | 6 | 6
(China) Xin Wang | 1 | 3
Q | P Kudermetova | 6 | 6
V Kudermetova | 2 | 3
(United States) P Stearns | 6 | 6

Second round
6 | A Kalinskaya | 3 | 3
(United States) A Krueger | 6 | 6
(Netherlands) S Lamens | 7 | 6
11 | (Poland) M Fręch | 5 | 3
13 | L Samsonova | 7^{9} | 3 | 2
Q | P Kudermetova | 6^{7} | 6 | 6
(United States) P Stearns | 6^{7} | 6 | 5
3 | D Kasatkina | 7^{9} | 4 | 7

Third round
(United States) A Krueger | 7 | 6
(Netherlands) S Lamens | 5 | 0
Q | P Kudermetova | 1 | 6 | 7
3 | D Kasatkina | 6 | 2 | 5

Quarterfinals
(United States) A Krueger | 6^{5} | 3
Q | P Kudermetova | 7^{7} | 6

==== Section 4 ====
First round
(Ukraine) A Kalinina | 6 | 2
(China) Y Wang | 4 | 0^{r}
(China) Y Yuan | 6 | 6
(Netherlands) A Rus | 2 | 4
A Potapova | 2 | 6 | 2
Q | (Romania) A Bogdan | 6 | 4 | 0^{r}
Q | (Australia) P Hon | 6 | 5 | 2
WC | (Australia) K Birrell | 3 | 7 | 6

Second round
5 | D Shnaider | 3 | 6 | 1
(Ukraine) A Kalinina | 6 | 4 | 6
(China) Y Yuan | 6 | 6
9 | (Ukraine) M Kostyuk | 4 | 3
16 | (Ukraine) D Yastremska | 5 | 4
A Potapova | 7 | 6
WC | (Australia) K Birrell | 7 | 7
2 | (United States) E Navarro | 5 | 5

Third round
(Ukraine) A Kalinina | 6 | 6
(China) Y Yuan | 1 | 4
A Potapova | 6^{2} | 2
WC | (Australia) K Birrell | 7^{7} | 6

Quarterfinals
(Ukraine) A Kalinina | 4 | 6 | 7
WC | (Australia) K Birrell | 6 | 1 | 5

== Qualifying ==
=== Seeds ===
1. (Turkey) Zeynep Sönmez (qualifying competition)
2. (United Kingdom) Harriet Dart (first round)
3. (Spain) Sara Sorribes Tormo (qualifying competition, retired)
4. (Australia) Daria Saville (first round)
5. (Slovakia) Anna Karolína Schmiedlová (qualifying competition)
6. (Romania) Ana Bogdan (qualified)
7. Polina Kudermetova (qualified)
8. (Romania) Anca Todoni (qualified)
9. (Germany) Eva Lys (first round)
10. (United Kingdom) Heather Watson (first round)
11. (Australia) Maddison Inglis (qualified)
12. (Czech Republic) Sára Bejlek (qualified)

=== Qualifiers ===
1. Polina Kudermetova
2. (Australia) Priscilla Hon
3. (Czech Republic) Sára Bejlek
4. (Australia) Maddison Inglis
5. (Romania) Anca Todoni
6. (Romania) Ana Bogdan

=== Qualifying draw ===
==== First qualifier ====
First round
1 | (Turkey) Zeynep Sönmez | 6 | 6
Ekaterina Makarova | 1 | 0
WC | (Australia) Astra Sharma | 3 | 2
7 | Polina Kudermetova | 6 | 6

Qualifying competition
1 | (Turkey) Zeynep Sönmez | 2 | 3
7 | Polina Kudermetova | 6 | 6

==== Second qualifier ====
First round
2 | (United Kingdom) Harriet Dart | 6^{6} | 6^{2}
(Australia) Priscilla Hon | 7^{8} | 7^{7}
Alt | (China) Guo Hanyu | 3 | 6 | 6
9 | (Germany) Eva Lys | 6 | 3 | 4

Qualifying competition
(Australia) Priscilla Hon | 7 | 6
Alt | (China) Guo Hanyu | 5 | 2

==== Third qualifier ====
First round
3 | (Spain) Sara Sorribes Tormo | 6 | 6
WC | (Australia) Tahlia Kokkinis | 3 | 3
WC | (Australia) Tina Nadine Smith | 3 | 6^{2}
12 | (Czech Republic) Sára Bejlek | 6 | 7^{7}

Qualifying competition
3 | (Spain) Sara Sorribes Tormo | 7^{8} | 2 | 0^{r}
12 | (Czech Republic) Sára Bejlek | 6^{6} | 6 | 1

==== Fourth qualifier ====
First round
4 | (Australia) Daria Saville | 2 | 6 | 5
(Ukraine) Anastasiia Sobolieva | 6 | 2 | 7
PR | (Belgium) Ysaline Bonaventure | 2 | 4
11 | (Australia) Maddison Inglis | 6 | 6

Qualifying competition
(Ukraine) Anastasiia Sobolieva | 3 | 0
11 | (Australia) Maddison Inglis | 6 | 6

==== Fifth qualifier ====
First round
5 | (Slovakia) Anna Karolína Schmiedlová | 6 | 6
WC | (Australia) Melisa Ercan | 2 | 3
PR | (Sweden) Mirjam Björklund | 1 | 2
8 | (Romania) Anca Todoni | 6 | 6

Qualifying competition
5 | (Slovakia) Anna Karolína Schmiedlová | 2 | 3
8 | (Romania) Anca Todoni | 6 | 6

==== Sixth qualifier ====
First round
6 | (Romania) Ana Bogdan | 6 | 6
(Australia) Arina Rodionova | 1 | 2
(Colombia) Emiliana Arango | 6 | 6
10 | (United Kingdom) Heather Watson | 4 | 4

Qualifying competition
6 | (Romania) Ana Bogdan | 6 | 6
(Colombia) Emiliana Arango | 2 | 4
