= 2009 Brisbane International – Men's singles =

Coordinates: 27°31′30″S 153°0′26″E

Men's singles
- 2009 Brisbane International

Final
- Champion: (Czech Republic) Radek Štěpánek
- Runner-up: (Spain) Fernando Verdasco
- Score: 3–6, 6–3, 6–4

Details
- Draw: 32 (4 Q / 3 WC )
- Seeds: 8

Events
Singles	men	women
Doubles	men	women
- Brisbane International

Michaël Llodra was the defending champion, but lost in the second round to Radek Štěpánek.

Radek Štěpánek won in the final 3–6, 6–3, 6–4, against Fernando Verdasco.

== Seeds ==
1. (Serbia) Novak Djokovic (first round)
2. (France) Jo-Wilfried Tsonga (quarterfinals)
3. (Spain) Fernando Verdasco (final)
4. (Sweden) Robin Söderling (quarterfinals)
5. (Czech Republic) Tomáš Berdych (second round)
6. (United States) Mardy Fish (first round)
7. (France) Richard Gasquet (semifinals)
8. (Czech Republic) Radek Štěpánek (champion)

== Draw ==
Key

- Q = Qualifier
- WC = Wild card
- LL = Lucky loser
- Alt = Alternate
- ITF = ITF entry
- PR = Protected ranking
- SR = Special ranking
- SE = Special exempt
- JE = Junior exempt
- JR = Junior Accelerator Programme entrant
- CO = College Accelerator Programme entrant
- NG = Next Gen Accelerator Program entrant
- w/o = Walkover
- r = Retired
- d = Defaulted

=== Finals ===
Semifinals
(France) Paul-Henri Mathieu	2	1
3	(Spain) Fernando Verdasco	6	6
8	(Czech Republic) Radek Štěpánek	2	6	6
7	(France) Richard Gasquet	6	2	4

Final
3	(Spain) Fernando Verdasco	6	3	4
8	(Czech Republic) Radek Štěpánek	3	6	6

=== Top half ===
First round
1	(Serbia) N Djokovic	4	4
(Latvia) E Gulbis	6	6
Q	(Russia) T Gabashvili	3	3
(France) P-H Mathieu	6	6
Q	(United States) B Reynolds	3	2
(Japan) K Nishikori	6	6
WC	(Australia) B Klein	0	4
5	(Czech Republic) T Berdych	6	6
3	(Spain) F Verdasco	6	6
WC	(Australia) B Tomic	4	2
Q	(United States) A Delic	6^{2}	7^{7}	6^{6}
(Croatia) M Ančić	7^{7}	6^{4}	7^{8}
(Spain) JC Ferrero	3	6^{3}
(France) F Serra	6	7^{7}
(Austria) J Melzer	6	4	7^{7}
6	(United States) M Fish	4	6	6^{4}

Second round
(Latvia) E Gulbis	3	4
(France) P-H Mathieu	6	6
(Japan) K Nishikori	7^{9}	6
5	(Czech Republic) T Berdych	6^{7}	3
3	(Spain) F Verdasco	6	6
(Croatia) M Ančić	2	3
(France) F Serra	6	6
(Austria) J Melzer	4	3

Quarterfinals
(France) P-H Mathieu	6	6
(Japan) K Nishikori	3	4
3	(Spain) F Verdasco	4	6	6
(France) F Serra	6	0	3

Semifinals
(France) P-H Mathieu	2	1
3	(Spain) F Verdasco	6	6

=== Bottom half ===
First round
8	(Czech Republic) R Štěpánek	6	6
(Russia) I Kunitsyn	2	2
(France) M Llodra	5	7^{7}	6
Q	(Australia) J Sirianni	7	6^{3}	2
(France) J Benneteau	3	6	7
(United States) R Ginepri	6	3	5
(United States) S Querrey	3	3
4	(Sweden) R Söderling	6	6
7	(France) R Gasquet	4	6	6
(France) M Gicquel	6	2	2
(United States) T Dent	7^{7}	6
(Belgium) S Darcis	6^{0}	2
(Finland) J Nieminen	5	6	6
WC	(Cyprus) M Baghdatis	7	1	4
(Argentina) A Calleri	2	5
2	(France) J-W Tsonga	6	7

Second round
8	(Czech Republic) R Štěpánek	7^{7}	6
(France) M Llodra	6^{2}	3
(France) J Benneteau	3	3
4	(Sweden) R Söderling	6	6
7	(France) R Gasquet	7	6
(United States) T Dent	5	4
(Finland) J Nieminen	6	6^{1}	6^{5}
2	(France) J-W Tsonga	0	7^{7}	7^{7}

Quarterfinals
8	(Czech Republic) R Štěpánek	2	6	6
4	(Sweden) R Söderling	6	4	3
7	(France) R Gasquet	1	6	6
2	(France) J-W Tsonga	6	4	2

Semifinals
8	(Czech Republic) R Štěpánek	2	6	6
7	(France) R Gasquet	6	2	4

== Qualifying ==
=== Seeds ===
1. (Russia) Teymuraz Gabashvili (qualified)
2. (United States) Bobby Reynolds (qualified)
3. (Germany) Mischa Zverev (second round)
4. (Brazil) Thomaz Bellucci (second round)
5. (Kazakhstan) Andrey Golubev (first round)
6. (Luxembourg) Gilles Muller (qualifying competition)
7. (Australia) Chris Guccione (first round)
8. (South Africa) Kevin Anderson (qualifying competition)

=== Qualifiers ===
1. (Russia) Teymuraz Gabashvili
2. (United States) Bobby Reynolds
3. (Australia) Joseph Sirianni
4. (Bosnia and Herzegovina) Amer Delić

=== Draw ===
==== First qualifier ====
First round
1	(Russia) Teymuraz Gabashvili	4	6	6
(Serbia) Ilija Bozoljac	6	3	4
WC	(Australia) Sam Groth	6	7^{7}
(Canada) Frank Dancevic	3	6^{1}
(Kazakhstan) Evgeny Korolev	6	6
(Austria) Martin Fischer	2	1
WC	(Australia) Greg Jones	6^{3}	4
8	(South Africa) Kevin Anderson	7^{7}	6

Second round
1	(Russia) Teymuraz Gabashvili	6	3	6
WC	(Australia) Sam Groth	2	6	3
(Kazakhstan) Evgeny Korolev	4	4
8	(South Africa) Kevin Anderson	6	6

Qualifying competition
1	(Russia) Teymuraz Gabashvili	6	2	6
8	(South Africa) Kevin Anderson	3	6	0

==== Second qualifier ====
First round
2	(United States) Bobby Reynolds	4	6	6
(Russia) Mikhail Elgin	6	2	3
(Slovenia) Luka Gregorc	6	6
(Netherlands) Jesse Huta Galung	4	4
(Germany) Simon Stadler	2	1
(Belgium) Xavier Malisse	6	6
(Australia) Peter Luczak	6	6
5	(Kazakhstan) Andrey Golubev	3	1

Second round
2	(United States) Bobby Reynolds	6	6
(Slovenia) Luka Gregorc	2	4
(Belgium) Xavier Malisse	6	6
(Australia) Peter Luczak	4	4

Qualifying competition
2	(United States) Bobby Reynolds	6	6^{5}	6
(Belgium) Xavier Malisse	4	7^{7}	3

==== Third qualifier ====
First round
3	(Germany) Mischa Zverev	6	6
(Ecuador) Giovanni Lapentti	3	4
(Australia) Joseph Sirianni	6	6
(Canada) Peter Polansky	2	4
(Kazakhstan) Mikhail Kukushkin	7	6
(Australia) Robert Smeets	5	4
WC	(Australia) Colin Ebelthite	7^{7}	4	4
6	(Luxembourg) Gilles Müller	6^{3}	6	6

Second round
3	(Germany) Mischa Zverev	5	1
(Australia) Joseph Sirianni	7	6
(Kazakhstan) Mikhail Kukushkin	5	7^{7}	6^{4}
6	(Luxembourg) Gilles Müller	7	6^{5}	7^{7}

Qualifying competition
(Australia) Joseph Sirianni	7^{7}	7
6	(Luxembourg) Gilles Müller	6^{5}	5

==== Fourth qualifier ====
First round
4	(Brazil) Thomaz Bellucci	6	6
(Australia) Carsten Ball	4	3
(United States) John Isner	5	3
(Italy) Andrea Stoppini	7	6
(Italy) Marco Crugnola	6	6
WC	(Australia) Mark Verryth	4	4
(Bosnia and Herzegovina) Amer Delić	6	7
7	(Australia) Chris Guccione	4	5

Second round
4	(Brazil) Thomaz Bellucci	3	4
(Italy) Andrea Stoppini	6	6
(Italy) Marco Crugnola	4	3
(Bosnia and Herzegovina) Amer Delić	6	6

Qualifying competition
(Italy) Andrea Stoppini	6^{5}	3
(Bosnia and Herzegovina) Amer Delić	7^{7}	6
