= 2009 Brisbane International – Men's doubles =

Coordinates: 27°31′30″S 153°0′26″E

Men's doubles
- 2009 Brisbane International

Final
- Champions: (France) Marc Gicquel (France) Jo-Wilfried Tsonga
- Runners-up: (Spain) Fernando Verdasco (Germany) Mischa Zverev
- Score: 6–4, 6–3

Events
Singles	men	women
Doubles	men	women
- Brisbane International

Martín García and Marcelo Melo were the defending champions, but García chose not to participate, and only Melo competed that year.
Melo partnered with André Sá, but lost in the first round to Travis Parrott and Filip Polášek.

Marc Gicquel and Jo-Wilfried Tsonga won in the final, 6–4, 6–3, against Fernando Verdasco and Mischa Zverev.

== Seeds ==
1. (Belarus) Max Mirnyi / (Israel) Andy Ram (quarterfinals)
2. (Brazil) Marcelo Melo / (Brazil) André Sá (first round)
3. (Sweden) Simon Aspelin / (Czech Republic) Pavel Vízner (quarterfinals)
4. (Czech Republic) Martin Damm / (Sweden) Robert Lindstedt (quarterfinals)

== Draw ==
Key

- Q = Qualifier
- WC = Wild card
- LL = Lucky loser
- Alt = Alternate
- ITF = ITF entry
- PR = Protected ranking
- SR = Special ranking
- SE = Special exempt
- JE = Junior exempt
- JR = Junior Accelerator Programme entrant
- CO = College Accelerator Programme entrant
- NG = Next Gen Accelerator Program entrant
- w/o = Walkover
- r = Retired
- d = Defaulted

=== Draw ===
First round
1	(Belarus) M Mirnyi (Israel) A Ram	4	6	[11]
(Czech Republic) T Berdych (Czech Republic) R Štěpánek	6	2	[9]
(United States) M Fish (United States) S Querrey	5	5
WC	(Australia) C Ball (Australia) C Guccione	7	7
4	(Czech Republic) M Damm (Sweden) R Lindstedt	7	7
(Argentina) L Arnold Ker (Brazil) B Soares	5	5
WC	(Australia) B Klein (Australia) B Tomic	6^{4}	6^{5}
(Spain) F Verdasco (Germany) M Zverev	7^{7}	7^{7}
(France) M Gicquel (France) J-W Tsonga	7	4	[10]
(Croatia) M Ančić (France) P-H Mathieu	5	6	[4]
(France) J Benneteau (France) M Llodra	4	5
3	(Sweden) S Aspelin (Czech Republic) P Vízner	6	7
(Austria) J Knowle (Austria) J Melzer	7^{16}	2	[4]
(United Kingdom) J Murray (Serbia) D Vemić	6^{14}	6	[10]
(United States) T Parrott (Slovakia) F Polášek	3	6	[10]
2	(Brazil) M Melo (Brazil) A Sá	6	2	[1]

Quarterfinals
1	(Belarus) M Mirnyi (Israel) A Ram	4	4
WC	(Australia) C Ball (Australia) C Guccione	6	6
4	(Czech Republic) M Damm (Sweden) R Lindstedt	3	3
(Spain) F Verdasco (Germany) M Zverev	6	6
(France) M Gicquel (France) J-W Tsonga	7^{7}	6
3	(Sweden) S Aspelin (Czech Republic) P Vízner	6^{1}	4
(United Kingdom) J Murray (Serbia) D Vemić	3	4
(United States) T Parrott (Slovakia) F Polášek	6	6

Semifinals
WC	(Australia) C Ball (Australia) C Guccione	4	2
(Spain) F Verdasco (Germany) M Zverev	6	6
(France) M Gicquel (France) J-W Tsonga	7	6^{4}	[10]
(United States) T Parrott (Slovakia) F Polášek	5	7^{7}	7

Final
(Spain) F Verdasco (Germany) M Zverev	4	3
(France) M Gicquel (France) J-W Tsonga	6	6
