= 2025 Brisbane International – Men's singles =

Men's singles
- 2025 Brisbane International

Final
- Champion: (Czech Republic) Jiří Lehečka
- Runner-up: (United States) Reilly Opelka
- Score: 4–1 ret.

Details
- Draw: 32 (6 Q / 3 WC )
- Seeds: 8

Events
Singles	men	women
Doubles	men	women
- Brisbane International

Jiří Lehečka won the men's singles tennis title at the 2025 Brisbane International, 4–1, after Reilly Opelka retired in the final. It was his second career ATP Tour title.

Grigor Dimitrov was the defending champion, but retired against Lehečka in the semifinals.

This tournament marked the return to professional tennis of former world No. 13 Nick Kyrgios after nearly two years out of competition due to a wrist injury. He lost to Giovanni Mpetshi Perricard in the first round.

== Seeds ==
1. (Serbia) Novak Djokovic (quarterfinals)
2. (Bulgaria) Grigor Dimitrov (semifinals, retired)
3. (Denmark) Holger Rune (first round)
4. (United States) Frances Tiafoe (second round)
5. (United States) Sebastian Korda (withdrew)
6. (Chile) Alejandro Tabilo (first round)
7. (Australia) Alexei Popyrin (first round)
8. (Australia) Jordan Thompson (quarterfinals, retired)

== Draw ==
Key

- Q = Qualifier
- WC = Wild card
- LL = Lucky loser
- Alt = Alternate
- ITF = ITF entry
- PR = Protected ranking
- SR = Special ranking
- SE = Special exempt
- JE = Junior exempt
- JR = Junior Accelerator Programme entrant
- CO = College Accelerator Programme entrant
- NG = Next Gen Accelerator Program entrant
- w/o = Walkover
- r = Retired
- d = Defaulted

=== Finals ===
Semifinals
PR	(United States) Reilly Opelka	6	7^{7}
(France) Giovanni Mpetshi Perricard	3	6^{4}
(Czech Republic) Jiří Lehečka	6	4
2	(Bulgaria) Grigor Dimitrov	4	4^{r}

Final
PR	(United States) Reilly Opelka	1^{r}
(Czech Republic) Jiří Lehečka	4

=== Top half ===
First round
1	(Serbia) N Djokovic	6	6
WC	(Australia) R Hijikata	3	3
Q	(United States) N Basavareddy	4	6	1
(France) G Monfils	6	4	6
Q	(Argentina) FA Gómez	5	4
PR	(United States) R Opelka	7	6
(Italy) M Arnaldi	6	6
7	(Australia) A Popyrin	3	2
4	(United States) F Tiafoe	7^{7}	6
WC	(Australia) A Walton	6^{5}	3
(France) G Mpetshi Perricard	7^{7}	6^{4}	7^{7}
PR	(Australia) N Kyrgios	6^{2}	7^{7}	6^{3}
(Czech Republic) J Menšík	7^{7}	6
Q	(Kazakhstan) M Kukushkin	6^{3}	4
(France) A Cazaux	4	4
LL	(Serbia) D Lajović	6	6

Second round
1	(Serbia) N Djokovic	6	6
(France) G Monfils	3	3
PR	(United States) R Opelka	7^{11}	7^{7}
(Italy) M Arnaldi	6^{9}	6^{4}
4	(United States) F Tiafoe	4	6^{4}
(France) G Mpetshi Perricard	6	7^{7}
(Czech Republic) J Menšík	6	6
LL	(Serbia) D Lajović	3	2

Quarterfinals
1	(Serbia) N Djokovic	6^{6}	3
PR	(United States) R Opelka	7^{8}	6
(France) G Mpetshi Perricard	7	7^{7}
(Czech Republic) J Menšík	5	6^{5}

Semifinals
PR	(United States) R Opelka	6	7^{7}
(France) G Mpetshi Perricard	3	6^{4}

=== Bottom half ===
First round
6	(Chile) A Tabilo	7^{10}	6^{5}	4
Q	(France) B Bonzi	6^{8}	7^{7}	6
(Argentina) M Navone	5	6^{7}
(Chile) N Jarry	7	7^{9}
(France) A Rinderknech	3	4
Q	(Japan) Y Nishioka	6	6
(Czech Republic) J Lehečka	7	6
3	(Denmark) H Rune	5	3
8	(Australia) J Thompson	3	6	6
(Italy) M Berrettini	6	3	4
(United States) A Michelsen	6	4	7^{12}
(Australia) C O'Connell	4	6	6^{10}
(Belgium) D Goffin	2	3
WC	(Australia) A Vukic	6	6
Q	(Germany) Y Hanfmann	6^{5}	3
2	(Bulgaria) G Dimitrov	7^{7}	6

Second round
Q	(France) B Bonzi	2	3
(Chile) N Jarry	6	6
Q	(Japan) Y Nishioka	2	7^{7}	4
(Czech Republic) J Lehečka	6	6^{5}	6
8	(Australia) J Thompson	7	6
(United States) A Michelsen	5	3
WC	(Australia) A Vukic	2	6^{5}
2	(Bulgaria) G Dimitrov	6	7^{7}

Quarterfinals
(Chile) N Jarry	4	4
(Czech Republic) J Lehečka	6	6
8	(Australia) J Thompson	1	1^{r}
2	(Bulgaria) G Dimitrov	6	2

Semifinals
(Czech Republic) J Lehečka	6	4
2	(Bulgaria) G Dimitrov	4	4^{r}

== Qualifying ==
=== Seeds ===
1. (Japan) Yoshihito Nishioka (qualified)
2. (France) Benjamin Bonzi (qualified)
3. (Serbia) Dušan Lajović (qualifying competition, lucky loser)
4. (Australia) James Duckworth (first round)
5. (Germany) Yannick Hanfmann (qualified)
6. (France) Lucas Pouille (qualifying competition)
7. (Kazakhstan) Mikhail Kukushkin (qualified)
8. (Chinese Taipei) Tseng Chun-hsin (first round)
9. (France) Richard Gasquet (qualifying competition)
10. (Slovakia) Lukáš Klein (first round)
11. (Argentina) Federico Agustín Gómez (qualified)
12. (United States) Nishesh Basavareddy (qualified)

=== Qualifiers ===
1. (Japan) Yoshihito Nishioka
2. (France) Benjamin Bonzi
3. (Argentina) Federico Agustín Gómez
4. (Kazakhstan) Mikhail Kukushkin
5. (Germany) Yannick Hanfmann
6. (United States) Nishesh Basavareddy

=== Lucky loser ===
1. (Serbia) Dušan Lajović

=== Qualifying draw ===
==== First qualifier ====
First round
1	(Japan) Yoshihito Nishioka	6	7^{7}
(Australia) Alex Bolt	2	6^{4}
(Australia) Li Tu	6	6
10	(Slovakia) Lukáš Klein	4	4

Qualifying competition
1	(Japan) Yoshihito Nishioka	6	2	6
(Australia) Li Tu	3	6	4

==== Second qualifier ====
First round
2	(France) Benjamin Bonzi	6	6
WC	(Australia) James McCabe	3	2
(Bulgaria) Adrian Andreev	6	3	7^{7}
8	(Chinese Taipei) Tseng Chun-hsin	4	6	6^{5}

Qualifying competition
2	(France) Benjamin Bonzi	3
(Bulgaria) Adrian Andreev	1^{r}

==== Third qualifier ====
First round
3	(Serbia) Dušan Lajović	5	7	2
WC	(Australia) Casey Hoole	7	5	0^{r}
(France) Ugo Blanchet	6	3	5
11	(Argentina) Federico Agustín Gómez	3	6	7

Qualifying competition
3	(Serbia) Dušan Lajović	1	6^{4}
11	(Argentina) Federico Agustín Gómez	6	7^{7}

==== Fourth qualifier ====
First round
4	(Australia) James Duckworth	4	4
(Australia) Tristan Schoolkate	6	6
(Argentina) Andrea Collarini	2	4
7	(Kazakhstan) Mikhail Kukushkin	6	6

Qualifying competition
(Australia) Tristan Schoolkate	4	4
7	(Kazakhstan) Mikhail Kukushkin	6	6

==== Fifth qualifier ====
First round
5	(Germany) Yannick Hanfmann	6	6
WC	(Australia) Jacob Bradshaw	4	2
WC	(Australia) Derek Pham	1	2
9	(France) Richard Gasquet	6	6

Qualifying competition
5	(Germany) Yannick Hanfmann	7^{7}	6
9	(France) Richard Gasquet	6^{4}	3

==== Sixth qualifier ====
First round
6	(France) Lucas Pouille	4	6	7^{8}
PR	(Australia) Jason Kubler	6	3	6^{6}
PR	(Croatia) Borna Gojo	6	6^{4}	4
12	(United States) Nishesh Basavareddy	4	7^{7}	6

Qualifying competition
6	(France) Lucas Pouille	4	4
12	(United States) Nishesh Basavareddy	6	6
