= 2025 Brisbane International – Men's doubles =

Men's doubles
- 2025 Brisbane International

Final
- Champions: (United Kingdom) Julian Cash (United Kingdom) Lloyd Glasspool
- Runners-up: (Czech Republic) Jiří Lehečka (Czech Republic) Jakub Menšík
- Score: 6–3, 6–7^{(2–7)}, [10–6]

Details
- Draw: 24 (2 WC )
- Seeds: 8

Events
Singles	men	women
Doubles	men	women
- Brisbane International

Defending champion Lloyd Glasspool and his partner Julian Cash defeated Jiří Lehečka and Jakub Menšík in the final, 6–3, 6–7^{(2–7)}, [10–6] to win the men's doubles tennis title at the 2025 Brisbane International.

Glasspool and Jean-Julien Rojer were the reigning champions, but Rojer chose to compete in Hong Kong instead.

== Seeds ==
All seeds received a bye into the second round.

1. (Croatia) Nikola Mektić / (New Zealand) Michael Venus (quarterfinals)
2. (Finland) Harri Heliövaara / (United Kingdom) Henry Patten (second round)
3. (United States) Nathaniel Lammons / (United States) Jackson Withrow (quarterfinals)
4. (United Kingdom) Joe Salisbury / (United Kingdom) Neal Skupski (withdrew)
5. (United Kingdom) Julian Cash / (United Kingdom) Lloyd Glasspool (champions)
6. (United Kingdom) Jamie Murray / (Australia) John Peers (second round)
7. (United States) Austin Krajicek / (United States) Rajeev Ram (quarterfinals, retired)
8. (Colombia) Nicolás Barrientos / (Belgium) Sander Gillé (second round)

== Draw ==
Key

- Q = Qualifier
- WC = Wild card
- LL = Lucky loser
- Alt = Alternate
- ITF = ITF entry
- PR = Protected ranking
- SR = Special ranking
- SE = Special exempt
- JE = Junior exempt
- JR = Junior Accelerator Programme entrant
- CO = College Accelerator Programme entrant
- NG = Next Gen Accelerator Program entrant
- w/o = Walkover
- r = Retired
- d = Defaulted

=== Finals ===
Semifinals
5	(United Kingdom) Julian Cash (United Kingdom) Lloyd Glasspool	w/o
Alt	(Australia) Rinky Hijikata (Australia) Jason Kubler
(Czech Republic) Jiří Lehečka (Czech Republic) Jakub Menšík	7	6
(Chile) Nicolás Jarry (France) Giovanni Mpetshi Perricard	5	2

Final
5	(United Kingdom) Julian Cash (United Kingdom) Lloyd Glasspool	6	6^{2}	[10]
(Czech Republic) Jiří Lehečka (Czech Republic) Jakub Menšík	3	7^{7}	[6]

=== Top half ===
First round
(Austria) A Erler (Germany) A Mies	4	7^{7}	[8]
WC	(Serbia) N Djokovic (Australia) N Kyrgios	6	6^{4}	[10]
(India) S Balaji (Mexico) MÁ Reyes-Varela	4	2
(France) M Guinard (France) A Rinderknech	6	6
(India) RC Bollipalli (Netherlands) R Haase	7^{7}	3	[10]
(Ecuador) G Escobar (Australia) J-P Smith	6^{4}	6	[6]
(Monaco) R Arneodo (France) A Cazaux	4	5
(United States) C Harrison (United Kingdom) M Willis	6	7

Second round
1	(Croatia) N Mektić (New Zealand) M Venus	6	3	[10]
WC	(Serbia) N Djokovic (Australia) N Kyrgios	2	6	[8]
(France) M Guinard (France) A Rinderknech	6	4	[10]
5	(United Kingdom) J Cash (United Kingdom) L Glasspool	4	6	[12]
Alt	(Australia) R Hijikata (Australia) J Kubler	6	6
(India) RC Bollipalli (Netherlands) R Haase	4	2
(United States) C Harrison (United Kingdom) M Willis	2	4
7	(United States) A Krajicek (United States) R Ram	6	6

Quarterfinals
1	(Croatia) N Mektić (New Zealand) M Venus	6	3	[3]
5	(United Kingdom) J Cash (United Kingdom) L Glasspool	4	6	[10]
Alt	(Australia) R Hijikata (Australia) J Kubler	2
7	(United States) A Krajicek (United States) R Ram	3^{r}

Semifinals
5	(United Kingdom) J Cash (United Kingdom) L Glasspool	w/o
Alt	(Australia) R Hijikata (Australia) J Kubler

=== Bottom half ===
First round
WC	(Australia) C O'Connell (Australia) J Thompson	6	3	[6]
(Czech Republic) J Lehečka (Czech Republic) J Menšík	4	6	[10]
(Romania) V Cornea (Argentina) M Navone	6	4	[10]
(France) G Jacq (Brazil) O Luz	2	6	[6]
(Chile) N Jarry (France) G Mpetshi Perricard	6	7^{7}
Alt	(Australia) T Schoolkate (Australia) A Walton	1	6^{5}
(United States) A Michelsen (Chile) A Tabilo	3	2
(Australia) J Duckworth (Australia) A Vukic	6	6

Second round
8	(Colombia) N Barrientos (Belgium) S Gillé	3	4
(Czech Republic) J Lehečka (Czech Republic) J Menšík	6	6
(Romania) V Cornea (Argentina) M Navone	4	6^{4}
3	(United States) N Lammons (United States) J Withrow	6	7^{7}
6	(United Kingdom) J Murray (Australia) J Peers	7^{7}	6^{5}	[7]
(Chile) N Jarry (France) G Mpetshi Perricard	6^{5}	7^{7}	[10]
(Australia) J Duckworth (Australia) A Vukic	6^{6}	6	[10]
2	(Finland) H Heliövaara (United Kingdom) H Patten	7^{8}	4	[8]

Quarterfinals
(Czech Republic) J Lehečka (Czech Republic) J Menšík	6	3	[10]
3	(United States) N Lammons (United States) J Withrow	3	6	[6]
(Chile) N Jarry (France) G Mpetshi Perricard	w/o
(Australia) J Duckworth (Australia) A Vukic

Semifinals
(Czech Republic) J Lehečka (Czech Republic) J Menšík	7	6
(Chile) N Jarry (France) G Mpetshi Perricard	5	2
