= Monika Wejnert =

Australian tennis player

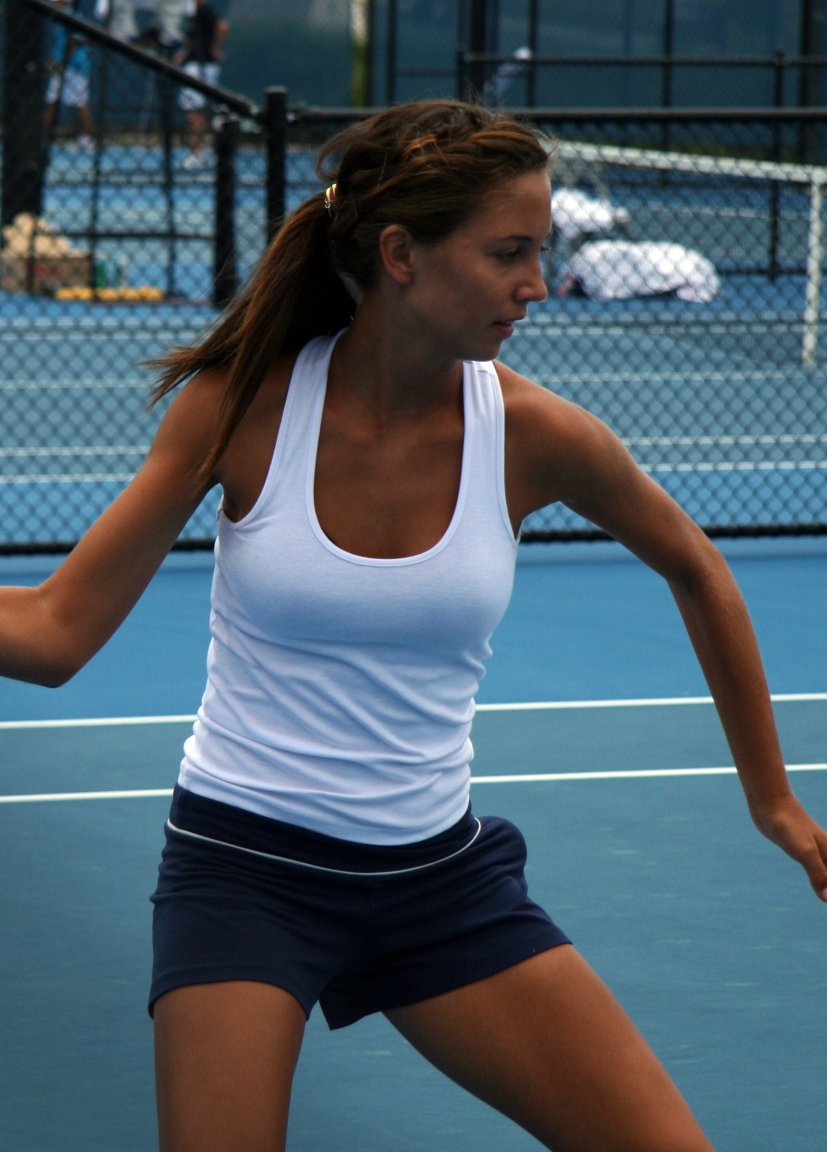
- Wejnert at the 2009 Brisbane International
- Country (sports): Australia
- Residence: Springwood, Queensland
- Born: 6 April 1992 (age 32); Brisbane, Australia
- Turned pro: 2008
- Prize money: $51,949
- Official website: MonikaWejnert.net

Singles
- Career record: 38–45
- Career titles: 1 ITF
- Highest ranking: No. 324 (30 November 2009)

Grand Slam singles results
- Australian Open: 1R (2009)

Doubles
- Career record: 18–31
- Career titles: 0
- Highest ranking: No. 315 (31 January 2011)

Grand Slam doubles results
- Australian Open: 1R (2011)
Medal record
Commonwealth Youth Games
| Gold medal – first place | 2008 Pune | Doubles |
| Bronze medal – third place | 2008 Pune | Singles |

Monika Wejnert (born 6 April 1992) is an Australian former tennis player. Her highest WTA singles ranking is 324, which she reached on 30 November 2009. Her career-high ranking in doubles is No. 315, which she achieved on 31 January 2011.

== Career ==
During the 2009 Australian Open wildcards round robin, Wejnert defeated Jelena Dokić in three sets. They met again in the final where she lost to Dokić in a three-set thriller. At the Brisbane International, Wejnert lost to eventual finalist Marion Bartoli, 1–6, 2–6. At the Australian Open, she lost in the first round to Karin Knapp in a tight match, 6–7, 4–6. Wejnert competed in the Nottingham Trophy where she beat Mandy Minella in the first round, before losing to eventual finalist Sandra Záhlavová.

== Personal life ==
Born in Brisbane, Monika Wejnert attended Rochedale State School, before moving to Saint Stephen's College on the Gold Coast for her final years of high school.

== Tennis statistics ==
=== ITF finals ===
Legend
$100,000 tournaments
$75,000 tournaments
$50,000 tournaments
$25,000 tournaments
$10,000 tournaments

==== Singles (1–0) ====
| Result | Date | Tournament | Surface | Opponent | Score |
|---|---|---|---|---|---|
| Win | 30 November 2008 | Perth, Australia | Hard | (Japan) Yurika Sema | 7–6, 7–5 |

==== Doubles (0–2) ====
| Result | Date | Tournament | Surface | Partner | Opponents | Score |
|---|---|---|---|---|---|---|
| Loss | 14 June 2010 | Alkmaar, Netherlands | Clay | (Belgium) Elyne Boeykens | (Russia) Anna Arina Marenko (Belarus) Sviatlana Pirazhenka | 3–6, 1–6 |
| Loss | 1 November 2010 | Kalgoorlie, Australia | Hard | (Hungary) Tímea Babos | (Australia) Daniella Dominikovic (Australia) Jessica Moore | 4–6, 6–2, [6–10] |
