= Brisbane International =

Coordinates: 27°31′30.12″S 153°0′26.06″E

Tournament information
- Event name: Brisbane International
- Founded: 2009; 17 years ago
- Location: Adelaide, SA (1880–2008); Brisbane, Queensland (2009–2020, 2024–)
- Venue: Queensland Tennis Centre (QTC)
- Surface: Hard (Plexicushion) – outdoors
- Website: brisbaneinternational.com.au

Current champions (2026)
- Men's singles: Daniil Medvedev
- Women's singles: Aryna Sabalenka
- Men's doubles: (United Kingdom) Lloyd Glasspool (Netherlands) Jean-Julien Rojer
- Women's doubles: (Chinese Taipei) Hsieh Su-wei (Latvia) Jeļena Ostapenko
ATP Tour
- Category: ATP 250
- Draw: 32S / 24Q / 24D
- Prize money: US$ 800,045 (2026)
WTA Tour
- Category: WTA 500
- Draw: 48S / 24Q / 24D
- Prize money: US$ 1,691,602 (2026)

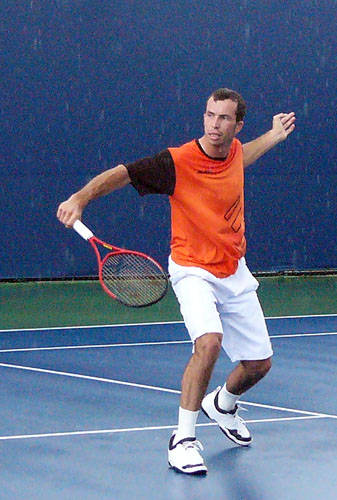
The 2010 men's singles runner-up, Radek Štěpánek, won the first edition of the event held in Brisbane

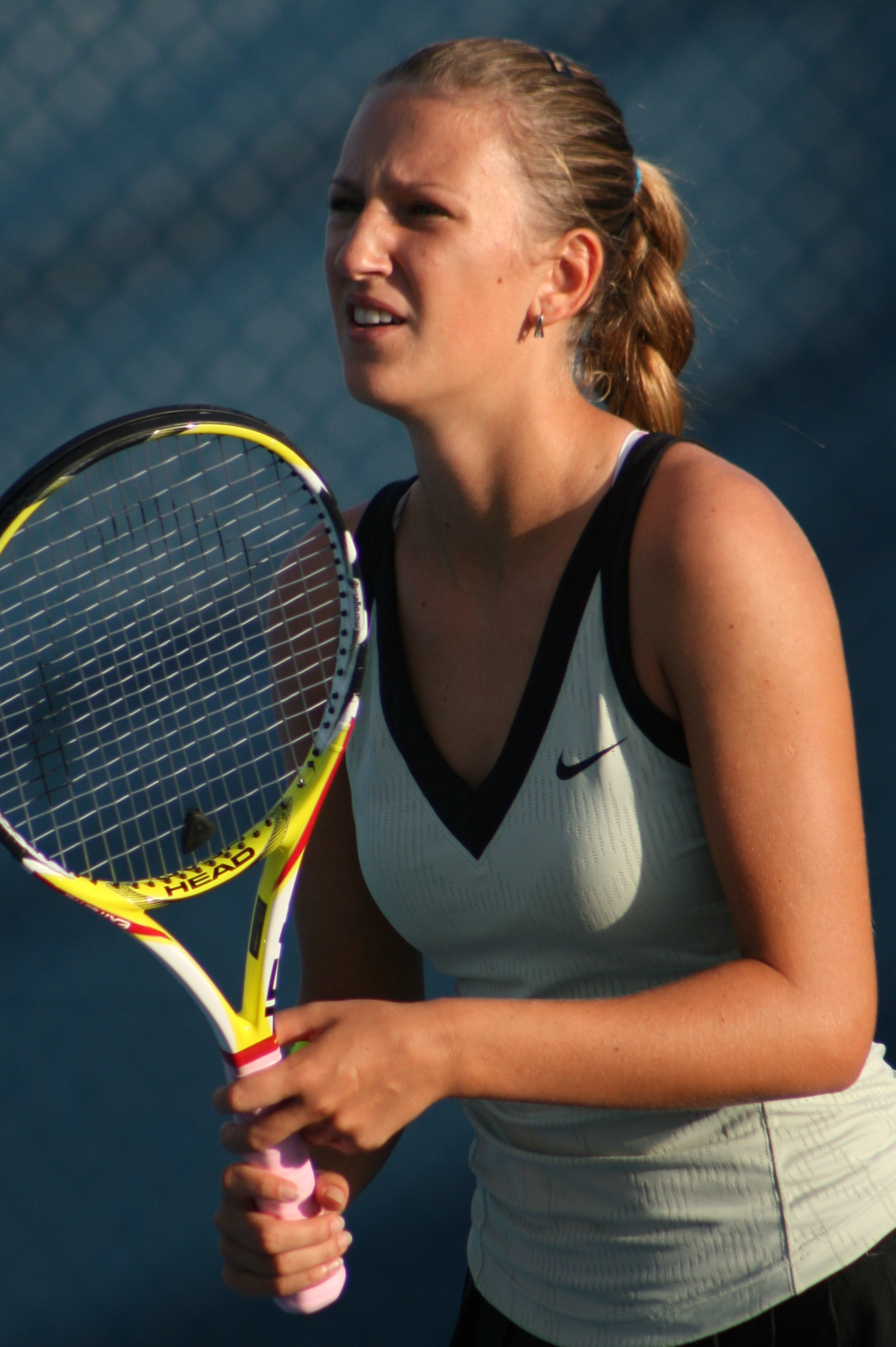
Victoria Azarenka won her first career title one year later in Brisbane in 2009, and would win the tournament once again in 2016

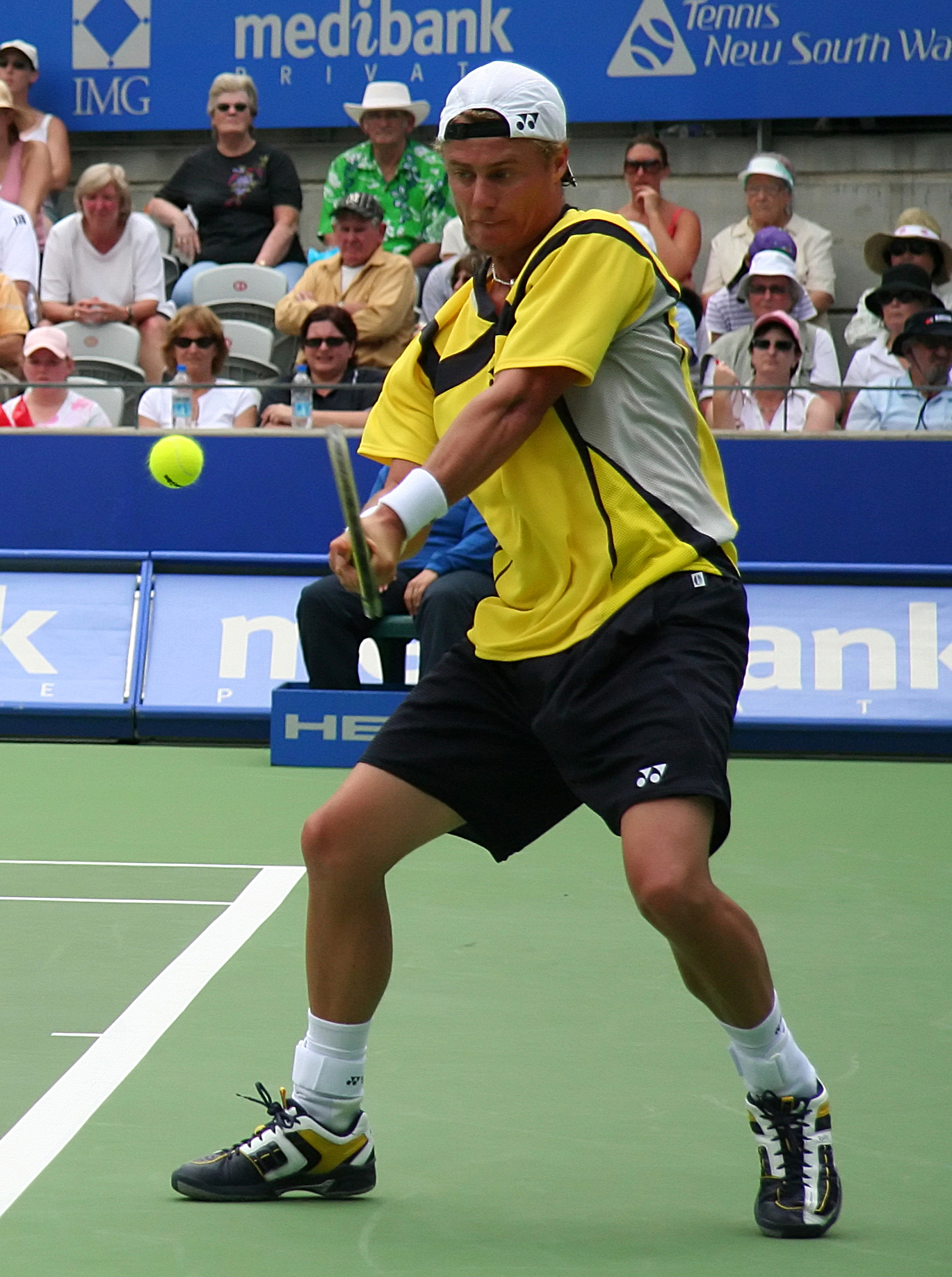
Former world No. 1 Lleyton Hewitt won the tournament once in (2014)

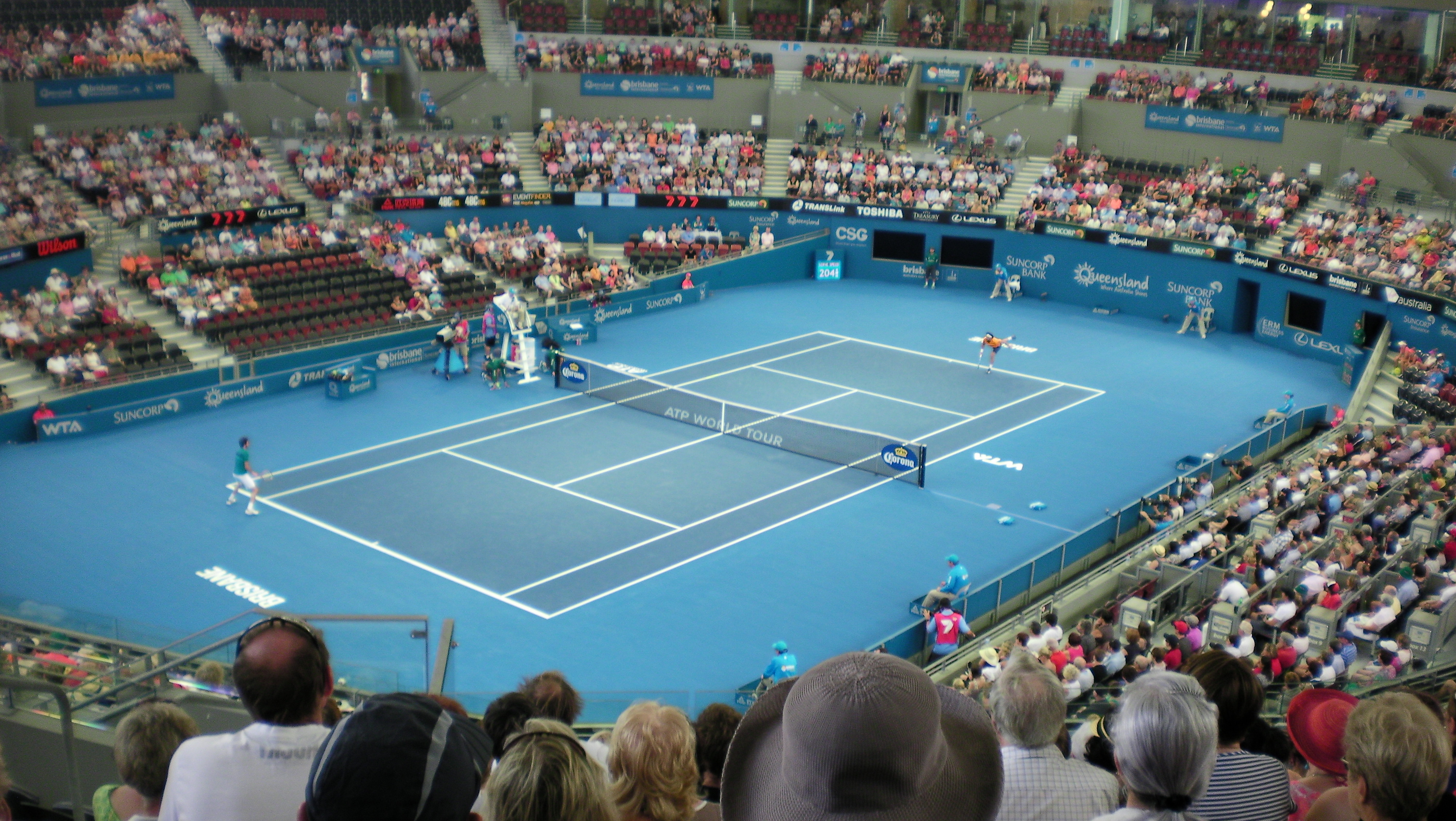
Inside of Pat Rafter Arena during a day session

The Brisbane International established in 2009 is a professional tennis tournament played on outdoor hardcourts in Brisbane, Queensland in Australia. It is a WTA 500 tournament and an ATP 250 tournament.

The tournament is held annually in January at the Queensland Tennis Centre just before the first Grand Slam tournament of the season, the Australian Open (part of the Australian Open Series). It is owned by Tennis Australia.

== History ==
In 1997, the Corel WTA Tour created a new event –played on outdoor hardcourts– in Gold Coast, Queensland. The Tier III Gold Coast Classic was added to the three preexisting tournaments of Auckland, Sydney and Hobart, and became one of the two events held in the first week of the women's calendar, parallel to the men's Adelaide tournament. Various players, among which Ai Sugiyama, Justine Henin, Patty Schnyder or Venus Williams found success over the years at the low tier tune-up event for the Australian Open. The Gold Coast Classic became the Thalgo Australian Women's Hardcourts in 1998, took the sponsorship of Uncle Tobys in 2003, becoming Uncle Tobys Hardcourts, and changed names again in 2006 to Mondial Australian Women's Hardcourts.

Meanwhile, the ATP International Series Australian Hard Court Championships in Adelaide, which had evolved into the AAPT Championships in 1999, Next Generation Hardcourts in 2005, and Next Generation Adelaide International in 2006 had become one of the three stops of the calendar's first week, alongside the Qatar Open of Doha, and the Chennai Open in India.

As both the men's and the women's tour calendars were to undergo important changes from 2008 to 2009, with the WTA inaugurating its new roadmap of International and Premier tournaments, and the ATP Tour becoming the ATP World Tour, with new Masters 1000, 500 and 250 events, it was decided in 2006 to merge the Next Generation Adelaide International and the Mondial Australian Women's Hardcourts into a larger ATP-WTA joint tournament in Brisbane, leading, similarly to the joint Medibank International Sydney, to the Australian Open. Tennis Australia chief Steve Wood commented on the shift: "One of the reasons we are doing this is that there's a rise of more lucrative overseas tournaments in the lead-up to the Australian Open offering increasingly attractive alternatives to the top players looking to prepare for the first Grand Slam. [...] So we really wanted them to invest in having them continue to prepare here in Australia, on the road to the Australian Open." The first Brisbane International took place in Brisbane's newly built Tennyson Tennis Centre – and its Patrick Rafter-named Centre Court – in January 2009. In time for the 2012 event the tournament was promoted to a premier event on the WTA tour.

Following the 2019 edition, the tournament was no longer recognised as an ATP event, due to the creation of the ATP Cup (played at the same venue). The tournament continued as WTA-sanctioned event for female tennis players.

As a result of the COVID-19 pandemic, the Brisbane International did not proceed, with the WTA Premier Event moved to Adelaide for the 2021, 2022 and 2023 seasons.

The Brisbane International returned in 2024, expanding to 48 players in WTA singles draw, 32 players in the ATP singles draw, and 24 pairs in both men's and women's doubles.

== Past finals ==
In the men's singles Andy Murray and Grigor Dimitrov tie for the record with 2 titles each. In the women's singles, Karolína Plíšková (2017, 2019–20) owns the record for most titles with three.

=== Women's singles ===
Location	Year	Champion	Runner-up	Score
Brisbane	2009	(Belarus) Victoria Azarenka	(France) Marion Bartoli	6–3, 6–1
Brisbane	2010	(Belgium) Kim Clijsters	(Belgium) Justine Henin	6–3, 4–6, 7–6^{(8–6)}
Brisbane	2011	(Czech Republic) Petra Kvitová	(Germany) Andrea Petkovic	6–1, 6–3
Brisbane	↓ Premier tournament ↓			
Brisbane	2012	(Estonia) Kaia Kanepi	(Slovakia) Daniela Hantuchová	6–2, 6–1
Brisbane	2013	(United States) Serena Williams	(Russia) Anastasia Pavlyuchenkova	6–2, 6–1
Brisbane	2014	(United States) Serena Williams (2)	(Belarus) Victoria Azarenka	6–4, 7–5
Brisbane	2015	(Russia) Maria Sharapova	(Serbia) Ana Ivanovic	6–7^{(4–7)}, 6–3, 6–3
Brisbane	2016	(Belarus) Victoria Azarenka (2)	(Germany) Angelique Kerber	6–3, 6–1
Brisbane	2017	(Czech Republic) Karolína Plíšková	(France) Alizé Cornet	6–0, 6–3
Brisbane	2018	(Ukraine) Elina Svitolina	(Belarus) Aliaksandra Sasnovich	6–2, 6–1
Brisbane	2019	(Czech Republic) Karolína Plíšková (2)	(Ukraine) Lesia Tsurenko	4–6, 7–5, 6–2
Brisbane	2020	(Czech Republic) Karolína Plíšková (3)	(United States) Madison Keys	6–4, 4–6, 7–5
Brisbane	2021; 2023	Not held		
Brisbane	2024	(Kazakhstan) Elena Rybakina	Aryna Sabalenka	6–0, 6–3
Brisbane	2025	Aryna Sabalenka	Polina Kudermetova	4–6, 6–3, 6–2
Brisbane	2026	Aryna Sabalenka (2)	(Ukraine) Marta Kostyuk	6–4, 6–3

=== Men's singles ===
Location	Year	Champion	Runner-up	Score
Brisbane	2009	(Czech Republic) Radek Štěpánek	(Spain) Fernando Verdasco	3–6, 6–3, 6–4
Brisbane	2010	(United States) Andy Roddick	(Czech Republic) Radek Štěpánek	7–6^{(7–2)}, 7–6^{(9–7)}
Brisbane	2011	(Sweden) Robin Söderling	(United States) Andy Roddick	6–3, 7–5
Brisbane	2012	(United Kingdom) Andy Murray	(Ukraine) Alexandr Dolgopolov	6–1, 6–3
Brisbane	2013	(United Kingdom) Andy Murray (2)	(Bulgaria) Grigor Dimitrov	7–6^{(7–0)}, 6–4
Brisbane	2014	(Australia) Lleyton Hewitt	(Switzerland) Roger Federer	6–1, 4–6, 6–3
Brisbane	2015	(Switzerland) Roger Federer	(Canada) Milos Raonic	6–4, 6–7^{(2–7)}, 6–4
Brisbane	2016	(Canada) Milos Raonic	(Switzerland) Roger Federer	6–4, 6–4
Brisbane	2017	(Bulgaria) Grigor Dimitrov	(Japan) Kei Nishikori	6–2, 2–6, 6–3
Brisbane	2018	(Australia) Nick Kyrgios	(United States) Ryan Harrison	6–4, 6–2
Brisbane	2019	(Japan) Kei Nishikori	(Russia) Daniil Medvedev	6–4, 3–6, 6–2
Brisbane	2020; 2023	Not held		
Brisbane	2024	(Bulgaria) Grigor Dimitrov (2)	(Denmark) Holger Rune	7–6^{(7–5)}, 6–4
Brisbane	2025	(Czech Republic) Jiří Lehečka	(United States) Reilly Opelka	4–1 ret.
Brisbane	2026	Daniil Medvedev	(United States) Brandon Nakashima	6–2, 7–6^{(7–1)}

=== Women's doubles ===
Location	Year	Champions	Runners-up	Score
Brisbane	2009	(Germany) Anna-Lena Grönefeld (United States) Vania King	(Poland) Klaudia Jans (Poland) Alicja Rosolska	3–6, 7–5, [10–5]
Brisbane	2010	(Czech Republic) Andrea Hlaváčková (Czech Republic) Lucie Hradecká	(Hungary) Melinda Czink (Spain) Arantxa Parra Santonja	2–6, 7–6^{(7–3)}, [10–4]
Brisbane	2011	(Russia) Alisa Kleybanova (Russia) Anastasia Pavlyuchenkova	(Poland) Klaudia Jans (Poland) Alicja Rosolska	6–3, 7–5
Brisbane	↓ Premier tournament ↓			
Brisbane	2012	(Spain) Nuria Llagostera Vives (Spain) Arantxa Parra Santonja	(United States) Raquel Kops-Jones (United States) Abigail Spears	7–6^{(7–2)}, 7–6^{(7–2)}
Brisbane	2013	(United States) Bethanie Mattek-Sands (India) Sania Mirza	(Germany) Anna-Lena Grönefeld (Czech Republic) Květa Peschke	4–6, 6–4, [10–7]
Brisbane	2014	(Russia) Alla Kudryavtseva (Australia) Anastasia Rodionova	(France) Kristina Mladenovic (Kazakhstan) Galina Voskoboeva	6–3, 6–1
Brisbane	2015	(Switzerland) Martina Hingis (Germany) Sabine Lisicki	(France) Caroline Garcia (Slovenia) Katarina Srebotnik	6–2, 7–5
Brisbane	2016	(Switzerland) Martina Hingis (2) (India) Sania Mirza (2)	(Germany) Angelique Kerber (Germany) Andrea Petkovic	7–5, 6–1
Brisbane	2017	(United States) Bethanie Mattek-Sands (2) (India) Sania Mirza (3)	(Russia) Ekaterina Makarova (Russia) Elena Vesnina	6–2, 6–3
Brisbane	2018	(Netherlands) Kiki Bertens (Netherlands) Demi Schuurs	(Slovenia) Andreja Klepač (Spain) María José Martínez Sánchez	7–5, 6–2
Brisbane	2019	(United States) Nicole Melichar (Czech Republic) Květa Peschke	(Chinese Taipei) Chan Hao-Ching (Chinese Taipei) Latisha Chan	6–1, 6–1
Brisbane	2020	(Chinese Taipei) Hsieh Su-wei (Czech Republic) Barbora Strýcová	(Australia) Ashleigh Barty (Netherlands) Kiki Bertens	3–6, 7–6^{(9–7)}, [10–8]
Brisbane	2021 2023	Not held		
Brisbane	2024	(Ukraine) Lyudmyla Kichenok (Latvia) Jeļena Ostapenko	(Belgium) Greet Minnen (United Kingdom) Heather Watson	7–5, 6–2
Brisbane	2025	Mirra Andreeva; Diana Shnaider	(Australia) Priscilla Hon; Anna Kalinskaya	7–6^{(8–6)}, 7–5
Brisbane	2026	(Chinese Taipei) Hsieh Su-wei (2) (Latvia) Jeļena Ostapenko (2)	(Spain) Cristina Bucșa (Australia) Ellen Perez	6–2, 6–1

=== Men's doubles ===
Location	Year	Champions	Runners-up	Score
Brisbane	2009	(France) Marc Gicquel (France) Jo-Wilfried Tsonga	(Spain) Fernando Verdasco (Germany) Mischa Zverev	6–4, 6–3
Brisbane	2010	(France) Jérémy Chardy (France) Marc Gicquel	(Czech Republic) Lukáš Dlouhý (India) Leander Paes	6–3, 7–6^{(7–5)}
Brisbane	2011	(Czech Republic) Lukáš Dlouhý (Australia) Paul Hanley	(Sweden) Robert Lindstedt (Romania) Horia Tecău	6–4, Ret.
Brisbane	2012	(Belarus) Max Mirnyi (Canada) Daniel Nestor	(Austria) Jürgen Melzer (Germany) Philipp Petzschner	6–1, 6–2
Brisbane	2013	(Brazil) Marcelo Melo (Spain) Tommy Robredo	(United States) Eric Butorac (Australia) Paul Hanley	4–6, 6–1, [10–5]
Brisbane	2014	(Poland) Mariusz Fyrstenberg (Canada) Daniel Nestor (2)	(Colombia) Juan Sebastián Cabal (Colombia) Robert Farah	6-7^{(4–7)}, 6–4, [10–7]
Brisbane	2015	(United Kingdom) Jamie Murray (Australia) John Peers	(Ukraine) Alexandr Dolgopolov (Japan) Kei Nishikori	6–3, 7–6^{(7–4)}
Brisbane	2016	(Finland) Henri Kontinen (Australia) John Peers (2)	(Australia) James Duckworth (Australia) Chris Guccione	7–6^{(7–4)}, 6–1
Brisbane	2017	(Australia) Thanasi Kokkinakis (Australia) Jordan Thompson	(Luxembourg) Gilles Müller (United States) Sam Querrey	7–6^{(9–7)}, 6–4
Brisbane	2018	(Finland) Henri Kontinen (2) (Australia) John Peers (3)	(Argentina) Leonardo Mayer (Argentina) Horacio Zeballos	3–6, 6–3, [10–2]
Brisbane	2019	(New Zealand) Marcus Daniell (Netherlands) Wesley Koolhof	(United States) Rajeev Ram (United Kingdom) Joe Salisbury	6–4, 7–6^{(8–6)}
Brisbane	2020 2023	Not held		
Brisbane	2024	(United Kingdom) Lloyd Glasspool (Netherlands) Jean-Julien Rojer	(Germany) Kevin Krawietz (Germany) Tim Pütz	7–6^{(7–3)}, 5–7, [12–10]
Brisbane	2025	(United Kingdom) Julian Cash (United Kingdom) Lloyd Glasspool (2)	(Czech Republic) Jiří Lehečka (Czech Republic) Jakub Menšík	6–3, 6–7^{(2–7)}, [10–6]
Brisbane	2026	(Portugal) Francisco Cabral (Austria) Lucas Miedler	(United Kingdom) Julian Cash (United Kingdom) Lloyd Glasspool	6–3, 3–6, [10–8]

== See also ==
- Australian Hard Court Championships – men's and women's tournament in various locations (1938–2008)
- South Australian Championships – men's tournament in Adelaide (1889–1989)
- Danone Australian Hardcourt Championships – women's tournament in Brisbane (1987–1994)
