= Angelique Kerber =

German tennis player (born 1988)

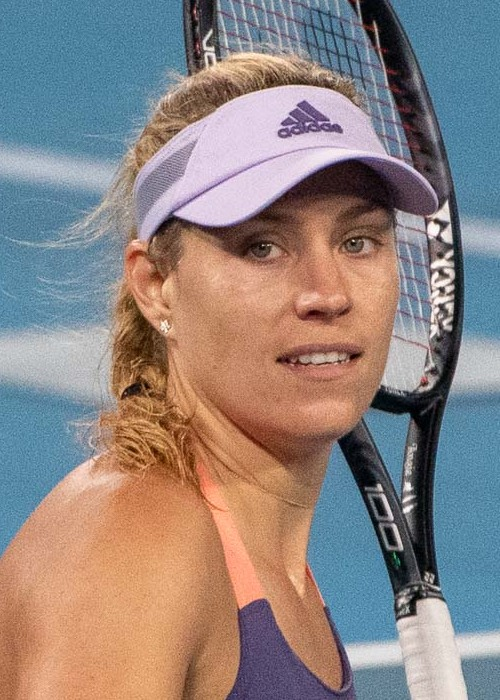
- Kerber at the 2020 Australian Open
- Country (sports): Germany
- Born: 18 January 1988 (age 38) Bremen, West Germany
- Height: 1.73 m (5 ft 8 in)
- Turned pro: 2003
- Retired: July 31, 2024
- Plays: Left-handed (two-handed backhand)
- Coach: Torben Beltz
- Prize money: US$32,545,460: 11th all-time in earnings
- Official website: angelique-kerber.de

Singles
- Career record: 683–378 (64.4%)
- Career titles: 14
- Highest ranking: No. 1 (12 September 2016)

Grand Slam singles results
- Australian Open: W (2016)
- French Open: QF (2012, 2018)
- Wimbledon: W (2018)
- US Open: W (2016)

Other tournaments
- Tour Finals: F (2016)
- Olympic Games: F (2016)

Doubles
- Career record: 59–64 (48.0%)
- Career titles: 0
- Highest ranking: No. 103 (26 August 2013)

Grand Slam doubles results
- Australian Open: 1R (2008, 2011, 2012)
- French Open: 2R (2012)
- Wimbledon: 3R (2011)
- US Open: 3R (2012)

Other doubles tournaments
- Olympic Games: 2R (2012)

Grand Slam mixed doubles results
- Wimbledon: 2R (2012)

Other mixed doubles tournaments
- Olympic Games: 1R (2012)

Team competitions
- Fed Cup: F (2014), record 13–12
- Hopman Cup: F (2018, 2019)
Medal record
Representing Germany
Olympic Games
Silver medal – second place	2016 Rio de Janeiro	Women's singles

Angelique Kerber (German: [ʔan.d͡ʒɛˈliːk ˈkɛɐ̯bɐ]; born 18 January 1988) is a German former professional tennis player. She was ranked as the world No. 1 in women's singles by the Women's Tennis Association (WTA) for 34 weeks, including as the year-end No. 1 in 2016. Kerber won 14 WTA Tour-level singles titles, including three majors at the 2016 Australian Open, 2016 US Open, and 2018 Wimbledon Championships. She also won a silver medal in women's singles at the 2016 Rio Olympics.

An accomplished left-handed player, Kerber made her professional debut in 2003 and came to prominence by reaching the semifinals of the 2011 US Open as the world No. 92. Kerber first cracked the top 5 in the rankings in 2012 and would eventually become the world No. 1 on 12 September 2016, becoming the oldest player to achieve the top ranking for the first time. Following a maternity leave, Kerber retired from the sport after the 2024 Paris Olympics.

== Early life ==
Kerber was born on 18 January 1988 in Bremen to Polish-German parents Sławomir Kerber, from Poznań, and Beata (née Rzeźnik), who is also her manager. She has one sister, Jessica. She grew up in Kiel, where her family stayed in an apartment in a training academy where her parents work, and started playing tennis at age three, eventually joining the junior circuit. Although born right-handed, Kerber plays left-handed.

== Career ==
=== 2003–2011: First WTA Tour final and US Open semifinals ===
Kerber made her first attempt to qualify for a WTA tournament in January 2005, at the Auckland Open, falling to Janette Husárová in the final round. In 2007, she made her Grand Slam main-draw debut at the French Open where she lost to 13th seed Elena Dementieva in the opening round. Shortly after, she appeared in the main draw of a WTA tournament for the first time, in Birmingham, where she reached the third round, losing to fifth seed Marion Bartoli, who was the eventual runner-up at Wimbledon that year. The week after Birmingham, she reached her first main draw quarterfinal at the Rosmalen Open where she was beaten by eventual champion Anna Chakvetadze, and then fell to Chakvetadze once more, in the first round of Wimbledon. At the US Open, Kerber drew Serena Williams in the first round and lost in straight sets. Kerber achieved her first top-100 season finish in 2007, at world No. 84. She won eight titles on the ITF circuit from 2004 to 2007.

Kerber achieved her first Grand Slam victory in 2008 at the Australian Open by defeating Maret Ani, before losing to 25th seed Francesca Schiavone. She also made the third round at Indian Wells where she lost to sixth seed Bartoli. Kerber did not progress much that year after that, besides winning a further two ITF titles. Her struggles would continue in 2009 as she managed just three wins in WTA main draws. She did qualify for the US Open that year, where she made the second round. She also won her 11th and final ITF title that year. She finished 2008 and 2009 respectively ranked barely outside the top 100, at No. 108 and No. 106, respectively.

In 2010, Kerber qualified for the Australian Open where she reached the third round of a major for the first time, losing to third seed Svetlana Kuznetsova in a close three-setter, from a set up. She then reached her maiden WTA final, in Bogotá, finishing runner-up to home star Mariana Duque Mariño, having upset top-seed Gisela Dulko in the semifinals. Kerber proceeded to reach two other quarterfinals that year, in Fes and Copenhagen, and also reached the third round of Wimbledon, where she defeated Sania Mirza and upset 13th seed Shahar Pe'er before losing to Jarmila Groth. At the end of the year, she made the third round in Beijing where she lost to Li Na, and capped off her season with a semifinal run in Luxembourg. She ended the year ranked No. 47.

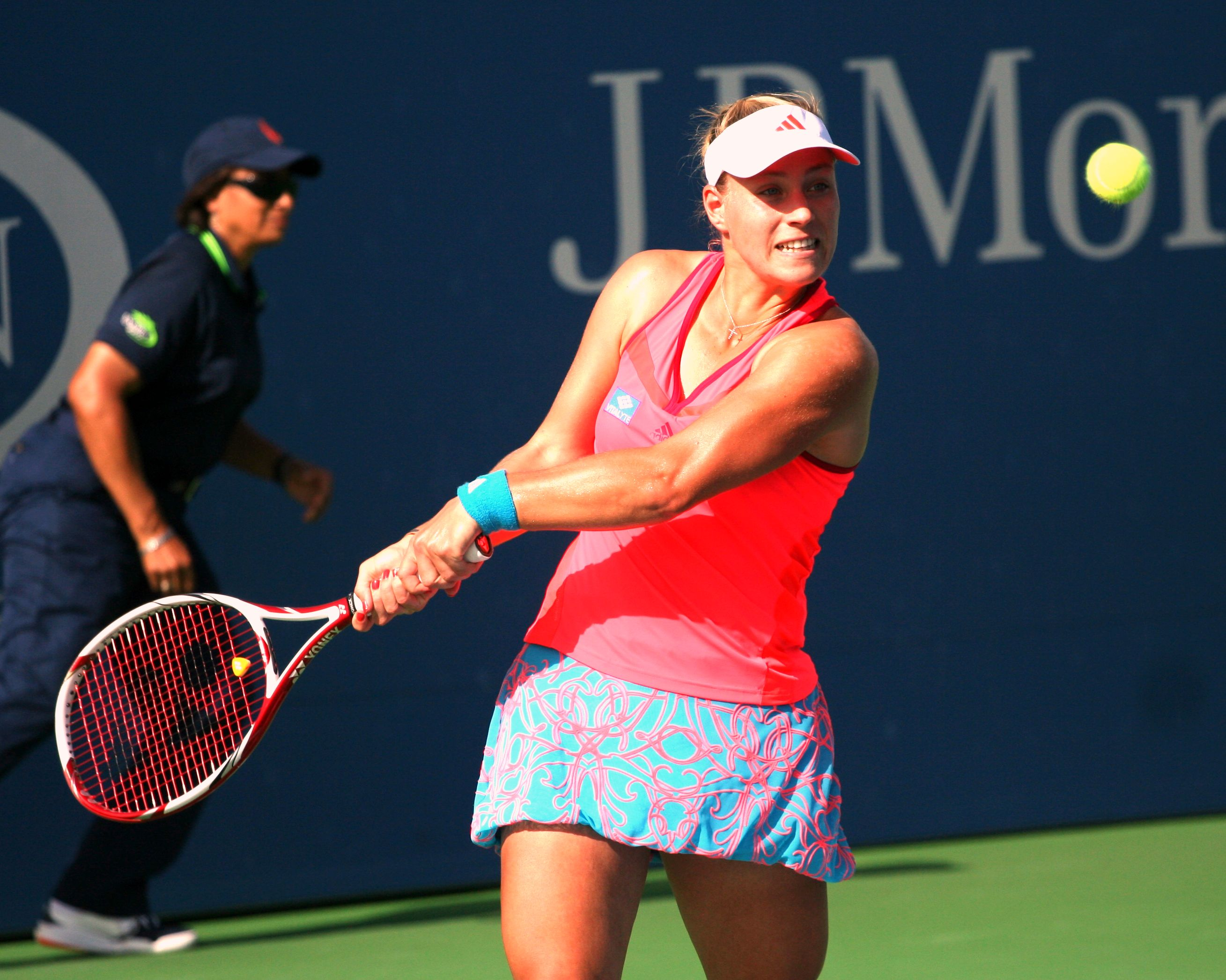
Kerber at the 2011 US Open, where she made her first Grand Slam semifinal

Kerber did not win back-to-back matches in the first seven months of 2011 except once, at her first tournament of the year, in Hobart. At Wimbledon, she lost to youngster Laura Robson in the first round. In Dallas, the week before the US Open, she recorded a semifinal run, where she lost to Aravane Rezaï.

Kerber entered the US Open ranked world No. 92, and passed the first hurdle with a win in three sets over Lauren Davis in three sets. Next, she faced 12th seed Agnieszka Radwańska and pulled off a shock three-set victory before going on to beat both Alla Kudryavtseva and Monica Niculescu to reach her maiden Grand Slam quarterfinal. There, Kerber surprised multiple-time quarterfinalist here Flavia Pennetta in three sets to advance to the semifinal, where she lost to ninth seed and eventual champion Samantha Stosur in three sets. Kerber reached a new career-high ranking of world No. 34 after the tournament.

She then qualified for the Pan Pacific Open and reached the second round, losing to eventual champion Radwańska from a set up. After that, she reached the semifinals in Osaka where she lost to eventual champion Bartoli. She finished the year as world No. 32, her second finish in a row in the top 50.

=== 2012: Wimbledon semifinals, first title, top 5 ===
Kerber's first tournament of 2012 was the Auckland Open where she reached the semifinals, falling to eventual runner-up Pennetta. At the Australian Open, Kerber was seeded at a Grand Slam tournament for the first time, and made the third round where she lost to fourth seed Maria Sharapova. As a result, Kerber rose to a new career-high ranking of world No. 27. She then competed in her first Fed Cup tie in almost five years, where Germany faced defending champions Czech Republic in the quarterfinals, and won her only rubber, defeating Lucie Hradecká in straight sets but the Germans lost the tie 1–3. At her next tournament was in Paris, Kerber lifted her maiden WTA singles title. After seeing off Lucie Šafářová and Niculescu to make the last eight, she upset top seed Sharapova in straight sets. Kerber then beat Yanina Wickmayer in the last four, and faced second seed Bartoli in the final, seeing off the home player in three sets to win the title. She then suffered an early loss at the Qatar Open in hands of unseeded Bulgarian Tsvetana Pironkova in the second round.

Kerber's continued her surge up the rankings through the coming three months, that culminated in her cracking the top 10 rankings for the first time in her career. She started with a semifinal appearance at the Indian Wells Open. Seeded 18th with a bye in the first round, she moved past three Americans in Sloane Stephens, Vania King and Christina McHale, the second one via a walkover. Kerber then upset eighth seed Li Na in the quarterfinals, but was stopped by world No. 1 and eventual champion Victoria Azarenka in the last four. Her ranking improved to a career-high world No. 14 as a result. In Miami, Kerber was upset in her opener by Zheng Jie. Her next stop was indoors, at the Danish Open where she was the second seed. In her opener, she struggled past Stéphanie Foretz Gacon and then defeated Anne Keothavong and fellow German Mona Barthel. After that, she defeated third seed Jelena Janković to reach her second final of the year. She won the title by defeating the top seed and defending champion Caroline Wozniacki in straight sets.

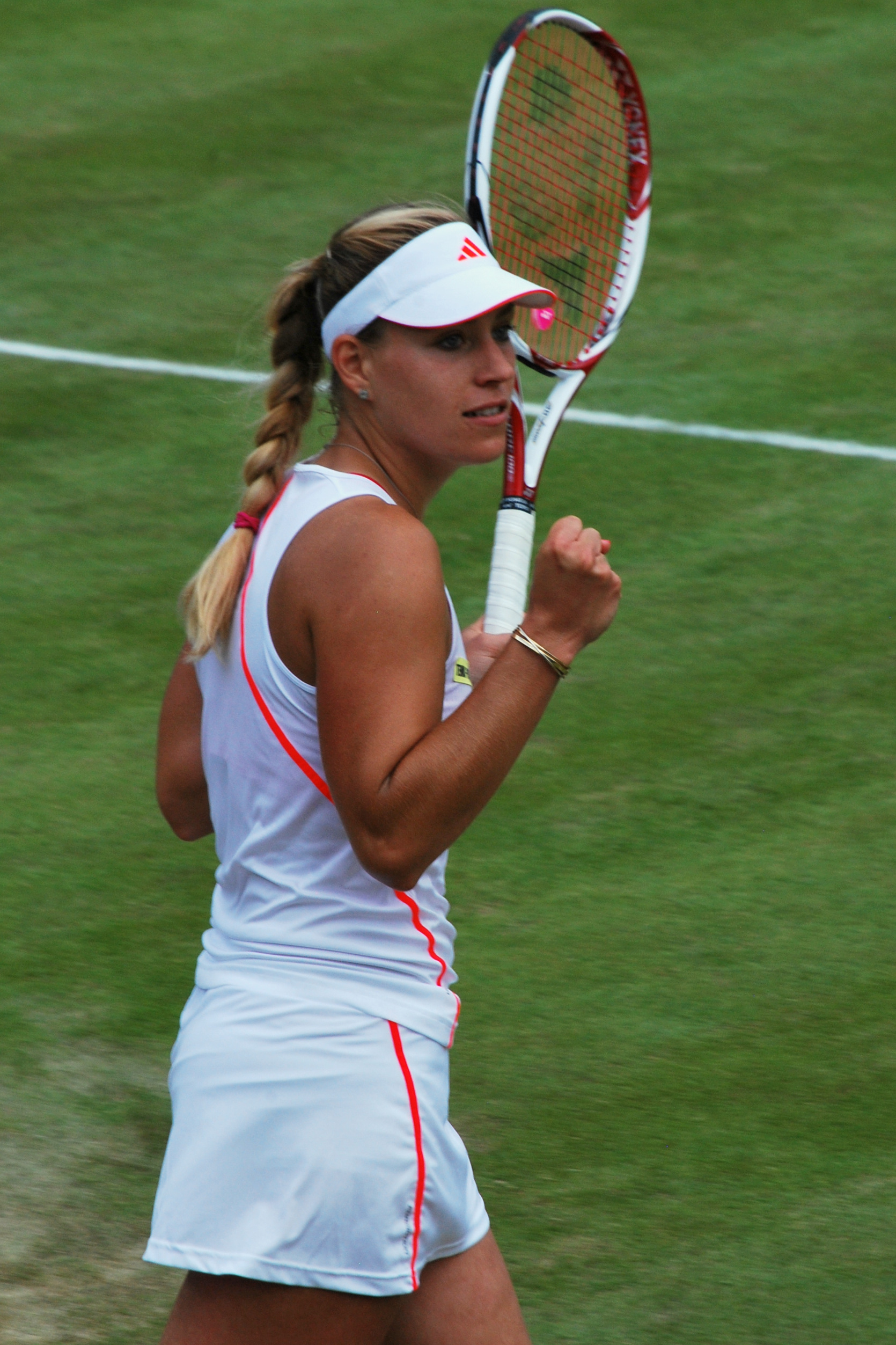
Kerber at the 2012 Wimbledon Championships, where she reached her second Grand Slam semifinal

Starting off her clay season on home soil, in Stuttgart, Kerber advanced to the quarterfinals with wins over Roberta Vinci and sixth seed Wozniacki, before losing to third seed Petra Kvitová. After an early exit in Madrid, Kerber advanced to the semifinals in Rome after avenging her Stuttgart loss to Kvitová in the last eight, which ensured herself a rise to the top 10 rankings for the first time in her career. In the last four, she lost to Sharapova in straight sets. At the French Open, 10th-seeded Kerber amassed back-to-back wins here for the first time after beating Zhang Shuai and Olga Govortsova. She then beat 18th seed Pennetta in three sets before seeing off Petra Martić in the fourth round to reach the quarterfinals, where she lost to eventual runner-up Sara Errani.

Kerber continued her steady rise of 2012 on grass, firstly by posting a runner-up appearance in Eastbourne, losing to a close final to Tamira Paszek, having served for the championship in the deciding set and missing five match points. At the Wimbledon Championships, Kerber was seeded eighth. She advanced to her second Grand Slam quarterfinal in a row, this time without losing set, by beating Lucie Hradecká, Ekaterina Makarova, 28th seed Christina McHale and former world No. 1 Kim Clijsters., the latter in 49 minutes. There, she defeated fellow German and 15th seed Sabine Lisicki in three sets, having been down a break in the third. In the semifinals, she lost to Agnieszka Radwańska. This was Kerber's then most recent equal-best Grand Slam result, for another three years until Australian Open in 2016.

At the London Olympics, Kerber made her first appearance at this stage, and was seeded seventh. On July 26th 2012 in her pre tournament press conference Kerber launched a lengthy obscenity filled tirade at the then Washington Post Tennis writer Brad Parks accusing him of trying to undermine her. [36][37] According to those present Kerber swore dozens of times. [38] The press officer ordered the assembled journalists not to publish any extracts from the tirade, but some journalists wrote up whatever they wanted from her remarks. Later in the interview, she announced that she would no longer speak to the Washington Post while she was on the tour. She escaped punishment but the ITF and WTA warned Kerber about her conduct and she would face sanctions if she repeated such actions. She defeated Petra Cetkovská and Tímea Babos first two rounds, to set up a clash with Venus Williams. There, she beat the former world No. 1 in two tiebreak sets, to make the quarterfinals where she lost to top seed and eventual bronze medallist Victoria Azarenka in straight sets. In the other disciplines, Kerber partnered Philipp Petzschner in mixed doubles and Lisicki in women's doubles, falling in the first and second rounds, respectively.

Competing at the Canadian Open to open her US Open Series campaign, Kerber lost early but bounced back at the Cincinnati Open with another strong result. First, she beat Babos and Andrea Hlaváčková to reach the quarterfinals, where she defeated Serena Williams for the first time, winning in straight sets, thus snapping Williams's 19-match winning streak. She continued with a win over Kvitová in the semifinals, to book a spot in her first Premier 5 final, but lost to Li from a set up. At the US Open, sixth-seeded Kerber won a close match against Venus Williams in the second round en route to the fourth round, but failed to defend her semifinal points from a year ago when she lost to eventual semifinalist Errani.

Kerber's next tournament was the Pan Pacific Open where she made it to the semifinals before losing to defending champion Radwańska. She also reached the quarterfinals of the China Open, but fell to eventual runner-up Sharapova. Her breakthrough season ensured herself qualification for her maiden appearance at the WTA Tour Championships. She also hit the world's top 5 rankings for the first time in her career, at world No. 5, entering the week of the season-ending championships, where she was seeded fifth. There, however, she exited the tournament in the round robin stage, without winning any matches, the losses coming in the hands of Serena Williams, Azarenka and Li. Nevertheless, Kerber ended the 2012 season at world No. 5, with 60 wins amassed throughout the season.

=== 2013–2014: Continued success, steady ranking in top 10 ===
Kerber began 2013 at the Brisbane International where she was seeded fourth, and made the quarterfinals where she was stopped by eventual runner-up Anastasia Pavlyuchenkova. Seeded second in Sydney, Kerber made the last four but lost to another eventual runner-up once more, this time in Dominika Cibulková. She then reached the fourth round of the Australian Open, completing the set of second-week appearances at all four Grand Slams. Along the way, she defeated Elina Svitolina, Lucie Hradecká, and wildcard Madison Keys. She was subsequently defeated by 19th seed Ekaterina Makarova after struggling with a back injury.

After a dry winless spell in the Middle East, Kerber bounced back with a second consecutive semifinal result at the Indian Wells Open, where she was stopped by eighth seed Caroline Wozniacki in three sets, despite having won the first set. Like the previous year, an early exit in Miami followed suit, this time to Sorana Cîrstea. Kerber then reached her first final of 2013 in Monterrey where she was the top seed but lost to Anastasia Pavlyuchenkova in three sets.

Kerber posted strong results on clay in 2013. Firstly, on Fed Cup, she helped Germany regain its place in the World Group by winning her rubber against Bojana Jovanovski, the German eventually winning the tie 3–2. She then recorded a run to the semifinals in Stuttgart, going one round better than the previous year, where she fell in three sets to defending champion Maria Sharapova. At the Madrid Open, sixth-seeded Kerber moved into the quarterfinals here for the first time after defeating top-40 opposition in Hsieh Su-wei, Alizé Cornet and Svetlana Kuznetsova. There, she lost to Ana Ivanovic in straight sets. At the French Open, Kerber reached the fourth round for the second year in a row but did not go further this time as she was beaten by former champion Kuznetsova in three sets. She did not enjoy much success on grass next, however, as she failed to post back-to-back wins in her tournament appearances on the surface, falling at the second hurdles of both Eastbourne and Wimbledon, to Makarova and Kaia Kanepi, respectively. Having failed to defend her semifinal result at Wimbledon from the year, Kerber fell to world No. 9 in the rankings after the tournament's conclusion.

After posting a quarterfinal at the Washington Open, Kerber made her only appearance of the US Open Series in Cincinnati but lost in third round to Li Na, in a rematch of last year's championship match. At the US Open, eighth seed Kerber posted her third fourth-round result at the Grand Slams this year, and second in a row here, after defeating Hradecká, Eugenie Bouchard and 25th seed Kanepi but then lost to 18th seed Carla Suárez Navarro this time.

During the Asian swing, Kerber's form improved as she reached her second final of 2013, at the Pan Pacific Open, having defeated Ivanovic, Wozniacki and Radwańska en route, but there, she lost to Petra Kvitová in three sets. The following week at the China Open, she reached the quarterfinals where she lost to Radwańska, and then advanced into her third final of the season, at the Linz Open. There, Kerber scored her third career title, and third indoors, as she defeated two-time champion Ivanovic, thus and filling up the last spot at the WTA Tour Championships. In her second outing at the Championships, Kerber failed to get past the round robin stage, once more, with losses to Serena Williams and Kvitová. However, she did record her maiden victory at this stage by defeating Radwańska, in her second round robin match. Kerber would finish the year as world No. 9.

Kerber began 2014 the same way she did in 2013, logging in quarterfinal or better results in both Brisbane and Sydney, going one round better in the latter this time around by making the final but there, she was stunned by qualifier Tsvetana Pironkova in straight sets. She made the fourth round of the Australian Open once more, falling to 28th seed Flavia Pennetta in three sets this time around. At the Open GdF Suez, former champion Kerber made the quarterfinals where she lost to eventual champion Anastasia Pavlyuchenkova. In Fed Cup quarterfinal play against Slovakia, Kerber contributed to the German team's victory by winning both her singles rubbers, over Dominika Cibulková and Daniela Hantuchová.

At the Qatar Open, Kerber sailed into her first quarterfinal in the Middle East with wins over Karolína Plíšková and Klára Koukalová. She subsequently moved into her second final of 2014 with wins over qualifier Petra Cetkovská and fifth seed Jelena Janković. There, she lost to Simona Halep in straight sets. After a two-match losing streak across Dubai and Indian Wells, fifth-seeded Kerber made her first quarterfinal showing in Miami, where she lost to defending champion Serena Williams in straight sets.

In April, Kerber helped put her country in the Fed Cup final, with Germany taking on Australia in the last four, by winning both her singles rubbers, against Samantha Stosur and Casey Dellacqua. However, she then endured a three-match losing streak to begin her season on clay, snapping it on home soil in Nuremberg with a quarterfinal appearance, where she was beaten by Plíšková. At the French Open, Kerber made the last 16 for the second year running, falling to rising star and 18th-seeded Bouchard this time around. On grass, Kerber enjoyed better results this year, starting off with her second appearance in the championship match at the Eastbourne International but finished runner-up once more, her third of 2014, this time to youngster Madison Keys in three sets. At Wimbledon, Kerber was seeded ninth and entered the second week for the fourth Grand Slam tournament running, with victories over the likes of defeated Urszula Radwańska, Heather Watson, and previous year's semifinalist Kirsten Flipkens. In the round of 16, she prevailed over reigning French Open champion and fifth seed Sharapova in three sets to move into the second last eight showing here. There, she lost to eventual runner-up Bouchard in straight sets.

Kerber opened her US Open Series campaign in Stanford where she was the third seed. She defeated CoCo Vandeweghe in three sets in her opener, to reach quarterfinals where she saw off Garbiñe Muguruza. A win over Varvara Lepchenko, where she had to save a match point, put her in her fourth final of the year, but she had to settle for the runner-up position again, for the fourth time in 2014 when she lost to Serena Williams. After a string of early exits in Montreal and Cincinnati, Kerber made the third round of the US Open with wins over Russian qualifiers, Ksenia Pervak and Alla Kudryavtseva, but lost to unseeded youngster Belinda Bencic.

Kerber posted deep runs in Tokyo and the inaugural Wuhan Open the following month, reaching the semifinals and quarterfinals, respectively. In her final tournament of the season, Kerber made the third round of the China Open where she lost to Svetlana Kuznetsova. Kerber did not qualify for the WTA Finals in 2014 but entered the tournament as an alternate, and would finish the season ranked world No. 10. Kerber finished the year by representing Germany in the Fed Cup final, where the team took on the Czech Republic. After dropping her first match to Lucie Šafářová, she came up against Petra Kvitová. There, Kerber dropped the first set tiebreak, and then avoided a bagel down 0–3 in the second set by coming back to win it 6–4. She came up short in the decider, however, as Kvitová launched her comeback from 1–4 down to win it 6–4, ensuring the Czech team an unassailable 3–0, and the title.

=== 2015: Four career titles ===
Kerber started her year of 2015 by posting deep runs in both Brisbane and Sydney International, with quarterfinal and semifinal results, respectively. However, at the Australian Open, she crashed out in the opening round to Irina-Camelia Begu, and it was the first time Kerber lost at the first hurdle of a Grand Slam tournament since Wimbledon in 2011. Representing Germany in the Fed Cup quarterfinals where the Germans faced Australia, Kerber scored a win out of her two matches played, over Samantha Stosur, but the 2014 runner-ups would progress by winning the tie 4–1. Her form however did not improve further across the months of February and March as she netted just two wins across five tournaments played, and by the start of April, she had fallen out of the top 10, for the first time since May 2012.

At the Charleston Open, fifth seed Kerber overcame a 4–2 third-set deficit to defeat Evgeniya Rodina in her opening match, and then cruised past Lara Arruabarrena to reach the last eight. Her run continued with a win over Begu in two tight sets, followed by another straight-set victory, over fellow German and defending champion Andrea Petkovic, to advance to her first final of 2015. There, Kerber faced seventh seed Madison Keys and she fought back from a 4–1 deficit in the third set to claim her fourth WTA title and her first since the fall of 2013, besides it being her first tournament triumph on clay. In the Fed Cup semifinals, where Germany faced Russia, Kerber won her only rubber played, against Anastasia Pavlyuchenkova in straight sets, dropping just one game. The win, however, was not enough as Germany lost the deciding doubles match.

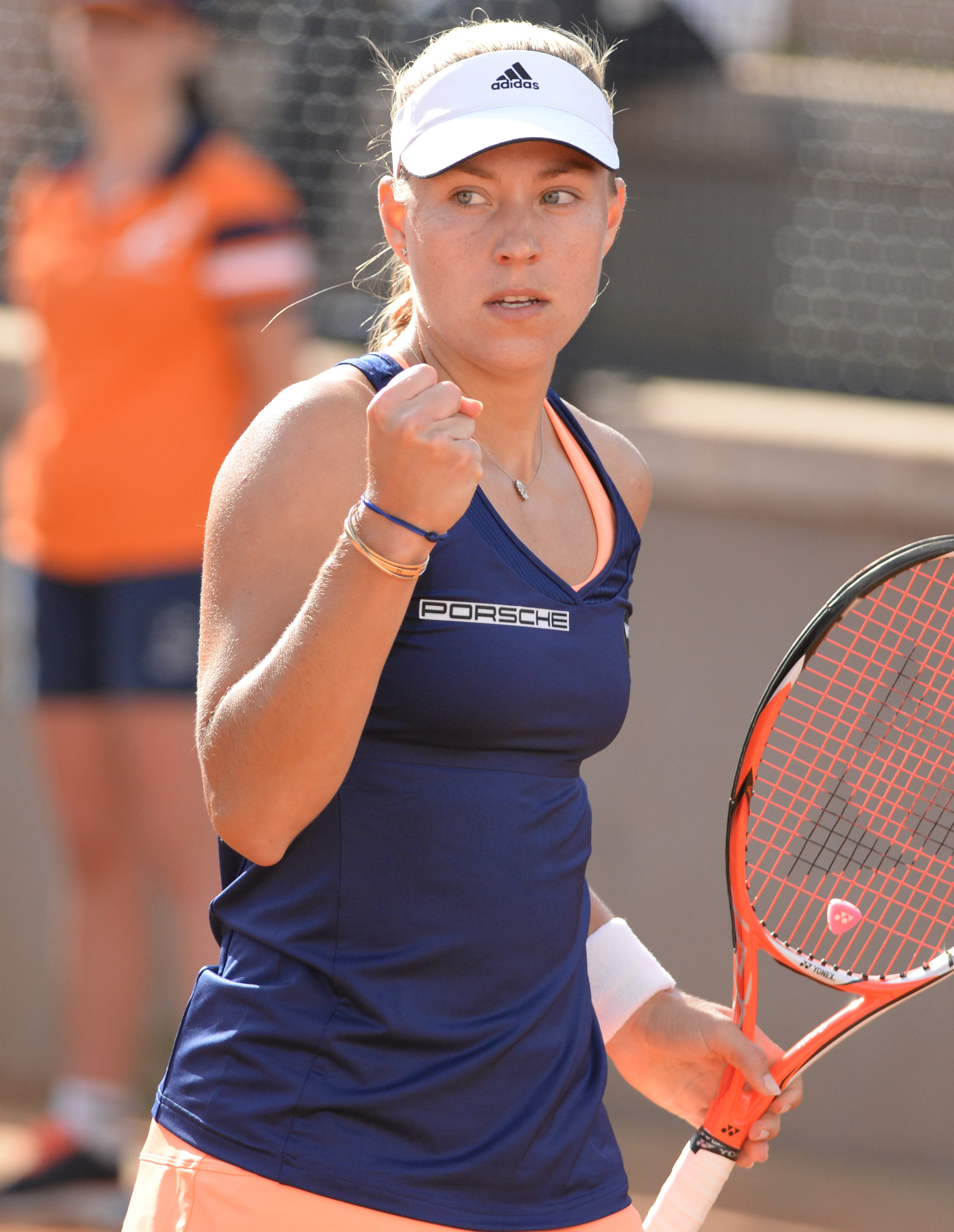
Kerber at the 2015 Italian Open

Kerber was unseeded in Stuttgart to open her season on red clay, and defeated Alexa Glatch in straight sets, before upsetting three-time defending champion Maria Sharapova in three sets. In the quarterfinals, she saw off Ekaterina Makarova, before beating Madison Brengle to reach her second final of the year. There, she fought back from a set and 5–3 down to prevail over Caroline Wozniacki, thus scoring her fifth career title, also her first on home soil, which saw her extend her winning streak on clay to 11 matches. That streak, however, expired in the hands of Stosur in the opening round of Madrid. At the Italian Open, Kerber reached the second round after defeating Alizé Cornet but lost to Begu once more. After a semifinal run in Nuremberg, Kerber exited the French Open in the third round from a set up, in the hands of Garbiñe Muguruza.

On grass, Kerber had a bright start, by lifting the title at the Birmimgham Classic where she was the fourth seed. En route, she advanced to the quarterfinals after defeating Tsvetana Pironkova and Jelena Janković. She then beat Kateřina Siniaková in straight sets to set up an all-German semifinal where she faced Sabine Lisicki, their first meeting since Wimbledon in 2012. Kerber won in straight sets and subsequently advanced to her third final of the season where she defeated Karolina Plíšková in a tight three-setter for her sixth career title, her first on grass. This marked the first time Kerber had won more than two titles in a season. At the Wimbledon Championships, Kerber advanced to the third round where she crossed paths with Muguruza once more, and lost to the eventual runner-up in three sets.

Kicking off her US Open Series campaign in Stanford, fifth-seeded Kerber defended her runner-up result from a year ago by beating Daria Gavrilova and Ana Konjuh to make the last eight where she edged past second seed Agnieszka Radwańska in a three-set marathon to reach the last four. She then beat Elina Svitolina to make the final where she met Plíšková, and defeated the Czech in three sets once again, this time to lift her seventh career title, and became the only player to win titles across all surfaces in 2015. Kerber did not enjoy better results on American hard courts in her following tournaments with early losses in Toronto and Cincinnati. At the US Open, she was the 11th seed came up short in the third round again, this time in a three-set defeat to 20th seed and two-time runner-up Victoria Azarenka in an epic encounter.

Kerber bounced back with stronger results in the Asian swing, starting off with a quarterfinal showing in Tokyo where she lost to Wozniacki in three sets. At the Wuhan Open, Kerber reached the last eight after dispatching Jelena Janković and Camila Giorgi, before moving past Coco Vandeweghe via retirement. In the semifinals, she lost to Muguruza once again, this time in straight sets. At the China Open next, Kerber advanced to the last eight where she lost to Radwańska in straight sets. Kerber would then reach her fifth final of the year at the Hong Kong Open but finished runner-up for the first time this season, falling to Janković in three sets. It was announced on 21 October that Kerber had qualified for the WTA Finals, marking her third appearance here. As the sixth seed, she was drawn into the same group with Muguruza and fellow left-handed players Petra Kvitová and Lucie Šafářová. She exited in the round-robin stage, managing just one win that came over Petra Kvitová. Having spent patches of 2015 out of the top 10, Kerber eventually concluded the season as world No. 10, maintaining her season finish from 2014.

=== 2016: Australian Open & US Open champion, world No. 1 ===
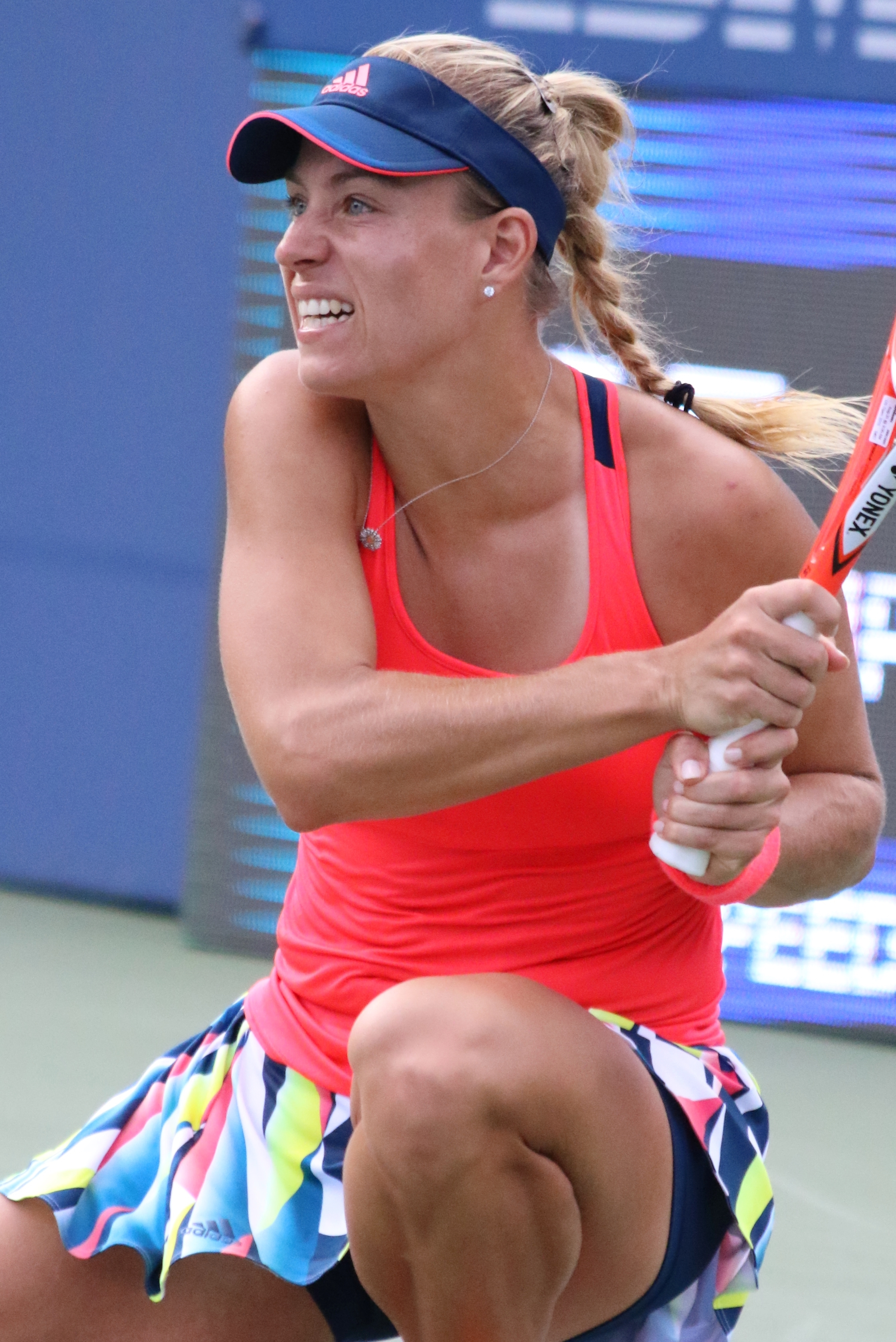
Kerber at the 2016 US Open, where she won the second of her two Grand Slam titles that year, and sealed the world No. 1 ranking

Kerber began the year at the Brisbane International, posting a runner-up result, with wins over Camila Giorgi, Madison Brengle, Anastasia Pavlyuchenkova and Carla Suárez Navarro en route to the final, where she lost to former champion Victoria Azarenka. In Sydney, Kerber defeated Elina Svitolina in the opening round but then withdrew with an illness.

Kerber was the seventh seed at the Australian Open and defeated Misaki Doi in the first round, having been a match point down. She then scored a triplet of straight-set wins over Alexandra Dulgheru, Brengle, and compatriot Annika Beck to reach her first quarterfinal in Melbourne, completing the sweep of quarterfinal appearances at all four Grand Slams in the process. In the quarterfinals, she avenged her Brisbane loss by defeating two-time champion Victoria Azarenka in straight sets, her first win against the Belarusian, to advance to the third Grand Slam semifinal of her career, her first since Wimbledon in 2012. There, Kerber defeated Grand Slam semifinal debutante Johanna Konta in straight sets to reach her maiden Grand Slam final. She defeated defending champion and world No. 1, Serena Williams, earning her first Grand Slam title and becoming the first German to do so since 1999. Besides becoming the first player to win a Grand Slam having been down match point in the first round, she also recorded her best ranking to date as world No. 2 following the achievement, surpassing her prior career-high of No. 5 set that she had set in 2012.

Representing Germany in the Fed Cup quarterfinals where the Germans faced the Swiss team, Kerber went 1–1 in her singles matches, with Germany losing the tie in the end. Kerber then endured a dry spell across the Qatar and Indian Wells Opens, dropping both her openers. However, she bounced back with a run to the semifinals in Miami where she was stopped by eventual champion Victoria Azarenka. At the Charleston Open, top seed and defending champion Kerber sailed into her consecutive semifinal but this time, retired to eventual champion Sloane Stephens due to a viral illness. In the Fed Cup World Group play-offs, the German team faced Romania and Kerber duly emerged victorious in her both her singles rubbers, over Irina-Camelia Begu and Simona Halep, losing only four games to the latter, and also her first ever win over her, to keep Germany in the World Group as the team would win the tie 4–1.

Kerber was the defending champion in Stuttgart, and successfully defended a title for the first time in her career. After a first-round bye, she beat Beck, Carla Suárez Navarro, and Petra Kvitová to reach the final. There she faced compatriot and qualifier Laura Siegemund and won ten games in a row from 2–4 down in the first set to defeat Siegemund and score her second title of the year and ninth of her career. Another losing streak ensued to close her clay season, however, which includes a loss to Kiki Bertens at the French Open, Bertens then becoming an eventual semifinalist herself.

Prior to Wimbledon, Kerber attempted to defend her title at the Birmingham Classic and sailed into the last eight where she met Suárez Navarro once again but lost to Spaniard. At Wimbledon, fourth-seeded Kerber did not drop a set, with wins over Laura Robson, Varvara Lepchenko, Carina Witthöft, Doi and fifth seed Halep, en route to her second semifinal here. There, she moved past former champion Venus Williams to reach the final, where she was defeated by Serena Williams, in a rematch of their Australian Open championship encounter earlier in the year, in straight sets.

After Wimbledon, Kerber played at the Swedish Open where she withdrew before her second round match due to an injury. She then reached her first quarterfinal at the Canadian Open with three-set wins over Mirjana Lučić-Baroni and Svitolina. She then beat Daria Kasatkina to make the last four when lost to eventual champion Halep. At the Rio Olympics, Kerber defeated Mariana Duque Mariño, Eugenie Bouchard, Samantha Stosur to record her second Olympic quarterfinal appearance. Two more wins, over Konta and Madison Keys, saw Kerber book her spot in the gold medal match, where she was defeated by surprise finalist Monica Puig of Puerto Rico in three sets. Kerber's strong summer continued at the Cincinnati Open where she had her first opportunity to dethrone Serena Williams as the world No. 1 but needs to win the title to do so. Kerber did make the final where she faced 15th seed Karolína Plíšková but lost in straight sets. Nevertheless, Kerber's strong results throughout the year thus far ensured herself qualification for the WTA Finals, which was announced on 22 August following the conclusion of the Cincinnati tournament.

At the US Open, Kerber beat the likes of Polona Hercog, Lučić-Baroni, CiCi Bellis and 14th seed Petra Kvitová to make the quarterfinals here for the first time since her semifinal run back in 2011. She continued with wins over eighth seed and 2015 runner-up Roberta Vinci, and a resurgent Caroline Wozniacki to reach her third Grand Slam final. Her win over Wozniacki, in the semifinals, combined with Serena Williams' defeat to 10th seed Plíšková in the same round meant that Kerber would unseat Serena Williams as the world No. 1 when the new rankings were released on 12 September the following week. In the championship match, Kerber gained her revenge over Plíšková by prevailing over the Czech in three sets to claim her second Grand Slam title, the 10th title overall of her career.

At the Wuhan Open, her first tournament since claiming the world No. 1 ranking, Kerber reached the third round where she fell short to Kvitová in a 3-hour-long match. She then fell in the same round at the China Open, this time to Svitolina. Her penultimate tournament appearance of 2016 came at the Hong Kong Open where she lost in the quarterfinals to Daria Gavrilova. On 17 October 2016, Serena Williams pulled out of the WTA Finals in Singapore due to a shoulder injury, and that withdrawal secured Kerber's spot at the summit of the WTA rankings for the rest of the year, including the year-end No. 1 ranking, another first in Kerber's career. As the top seed of the Tour Finals, Kerber was drawn in the same group alongside Halep, Keys, and Dominika Cibulková. She won all of her round robin matches, scoring back-to-back wins here for the first time in her career as well, en route to her first semifinal here. She then defeated defending champion Agnieszka Radwańska in straight sets to reach the final where she faced Cibulková once again that week, to whom she lost in straight sets.

=== 2017: Struggles with form and out of top 20 ===
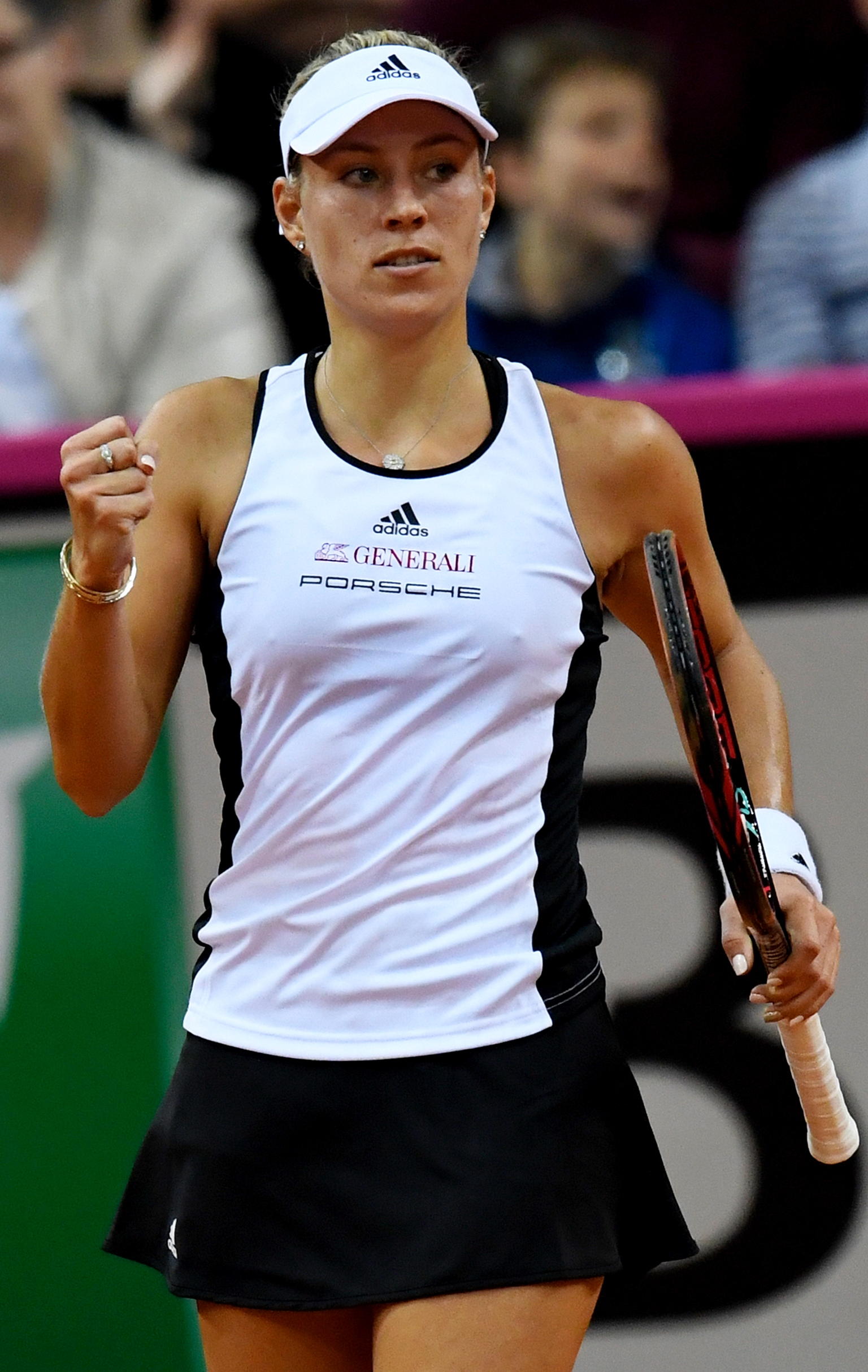
Kerber at the 2017 Fed Cup World Group Play-offs against Ukraine

At the start of the 2017 season, Kerber competed at the Brisbane International as the top seed, and won her opening match against Ashleigh Barty in three sets but then lost to Elina Svitolina in the quarterfinals. The following week in Sydney, she dropped opening match to Daria Kasatkina. As the top-seeded player and defending champion at the Australian Open, Kerber overcame a mid-match lapse to see off Lesia Tsurenko in the first round, where she squandered a match point in the second set. Kerber then defeated compatriot Carina Witthöft in the second round and Kristýna Plíšková in the third round. In the fourth round, Kerber lost to eventual semifinalist CoCo Vandeweghe in straight sets. Serena Williams, who lost to Kerber in the championship match here 12 months ago, won the tournament this time and amassed enough points to take back the top ranking from Kerber.

After a winless showing in Doha, Kerber made the last four in Dubai where she lost to eventual champion Svitolina. The following month, in Indian Wells, Kerber reached the round of 16 where she lost to another eventual champion, this time in Elena Vesnina, but it was enough for Kerber to regain the world No. 1 ranking owing to Serena Williams' withdrawal from the event. This was then followed by a quarterfinal appearance in Miami where she lost to Venus Williams, and then a runner-up showing in Monterrey, where in a rematch of the 2013 final, Kerber fell short to Anastasia Pavlyuchenkova in three sets.

Kerber's season on clay began with her ranking at world No. 2, and a loss in her opener in Stuttgart to eventual runner-up Kristina Mladenovic. At the Madrid Open, Kerber won back-to-back wins to reach the third round where she retired against Eugenie Bouchard with a back issue, but returned to world No. 1 after the tournament's conclusion nevertheless. At the French Open, Kerber became the first female top seed in history to be ousted in the first round here, falling in straight sets to Ekaterina Makarova. However, she fared better as the season moved to grass courts, by making the quarterfinals in Eastbourne where she was defeated by Johanna Konta. At Wimbledon, Kerber made the second week, falling in the round of 16 to the eventual champion Garbiñe Muguruza in three sets. Due to Kerber's early exit and Simona Halep's loss to Konta in the quarterfinals, Karolína Plíšková became the new No. 1 after the tournament.

Across the US Open Series, Kerber's struggles in 2017 continued as she netted just one victory across three tournament appearances in the North American hard court summer, which includes a first-round loss to Naomi Osaka at the US Open, where she was the defending champion. With this loss Kerber dropped out of the top 10. The following month, at the Pan Pacific Open, Kerber recorded her best result since Monterrey back in April, as she took revenge on Osaka and then defeated Kasatkina and Plíšková, before falling in the last four to Pavlyuchenkova. The said win over Plíšková in Tokyo was Kerber's best win by ranking since the 2016 WTA Finals. She would go on to score just one more win for the rest of the year, however, in the first round of the China Open where she beat Osaka once again. After dropping both her two matches in the group stage at WTA Elite Trophy, to Pavlyuchenkova and Barty, Kerber dropped out of top 20 for the first time since 2012, and finished the year ranked world No. 21. Shortly after, on 16 November 2017, Kerber announced that she had parted ways with longtime coach Torben Beltz and has hired Wim Fissette as new coach.

=== 2018: Wimbledon champion, world No. 2 ===
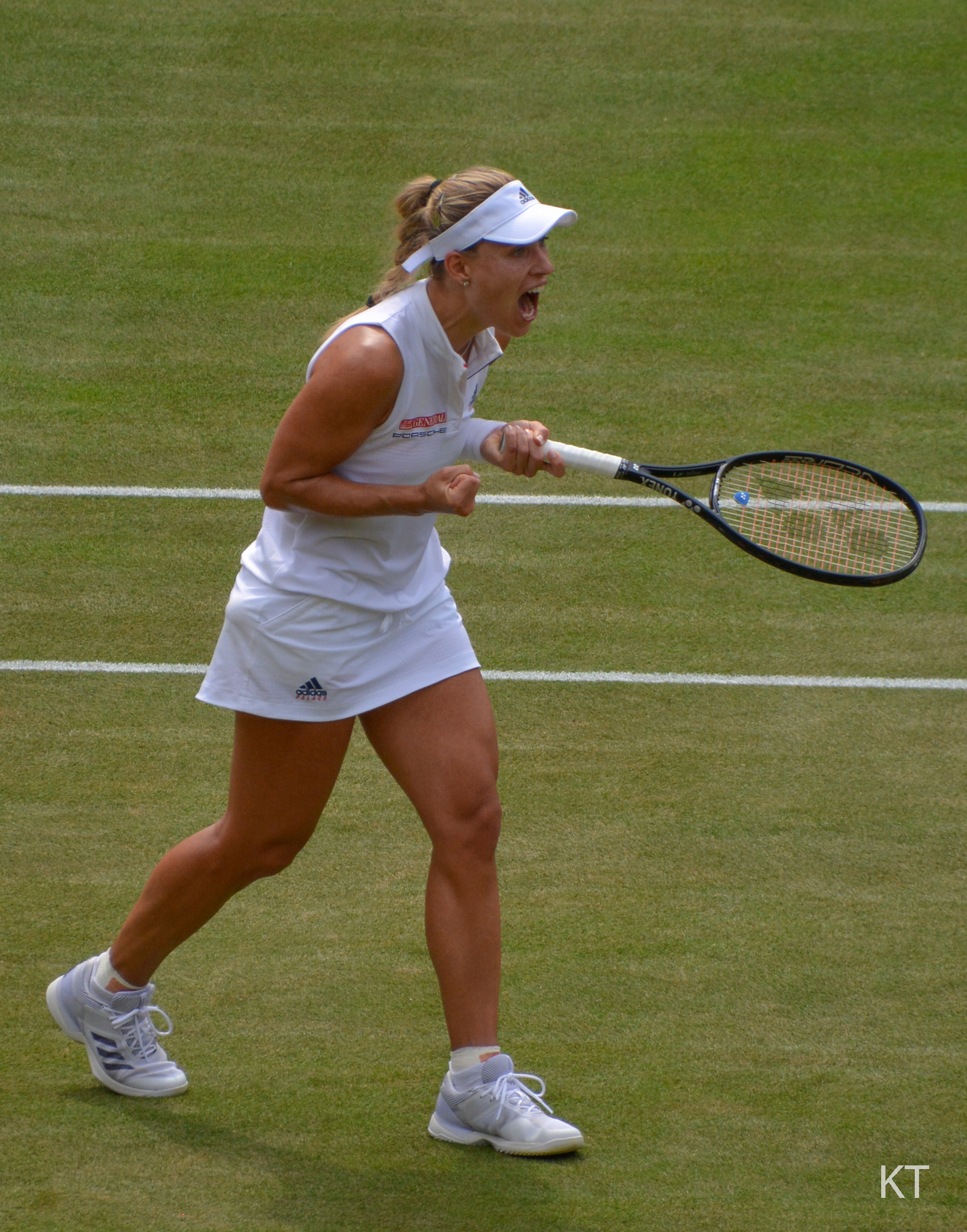
Kerber at the 2018 Wimbledon Championships, where she won her third and most recent Grand Slam title

Kerber started her 2018 season with a first ever appearance at the Hopman Cup, where she partnered with Alexander Zverev. She went undefeated in her singles matches and helped the team cruise into the final where they lost to Switzerland. Kerber followed up that performance with her first title in more than a year, at the Sydney International next. To make the final, she edged past Lucie Šafářová and Venus Williams, saving a match point against the former, to make the quarterfinals where she beat Dominika Cibulková. She set up a championship match with home star Ashleigh Barty after moving past Camila Giorgi. There, she beat the Aussie in straight sets for her 11th career title. At the Australian Open, 21st-seeded Kerber moved into the fourth round with wins over Anna-Lena Friedsam, Donna Vekić and former world No. 1 Maria Sharapova, all in straight sets and dropping no more than four games a set. There, she saw off Hsieh Su-wei in three sets to move into her second quarterfinal here, where she swept aside Madison Keys. In the semifinal, a clash against world No. 1, Simona Halep, both had two match points in the third set but neither were converted. The match then ended 9–7 in the third set, with Halep prevailing. Following her strong Australian summer, Kerber returned to the top 10 once again, ranked world No. 9.

Kerber then made the last eight at the Qatar Ladies Open where she lost to world No. 1 Caroline Wozniacki in three-sets. The following week in Dubai, she lost to Elina Svitolina in the semifinals for the second year in a row, that being her fifth consecutive loss as well. At the Indian Wells Open, 10th seed Kerber beat Ekaterina Makarova and Elena Vesnina, avenging her defeat to the latter here a year ago, to reach the last 16 where she beat Caroline Garcia. She lost in the quarterfinals to Daria Kasatkina. Kerber carried on her good form through the Miami Open by sailing into the quarterfinals, defeating Johanna Larsson, Anastasia Pavlyuchenkova and Wang Yafan en route, where she was stopped by eventual champion Sloane Stephens, thus ensuring the latter her top-10 debut.

In the Fed Cup semifinal tie against Czech Republic, Kerber dropped both her matches, to Karolína Plíšková and Petra Kvitová. both of her matches she lost in straight sets, the latter defeat ensuring the Czechs a spot in the final. She gained her revenge over Kvitová at first hurdle of the Stuttgart tournament the week after, before retiring against Anett Kontaveit in the following round. She was forced to skip the tournament in Madrid as a result, but bounced back at the Italian Open by making the last eight here for the second time, her first since 2012, but fell victim to eventual champion Svitolina, for the sixth time running. At the French Open, 12th seed Kerber snapped her losing streak here by defeating compatriot Mona Barthel in the first round. After seeing off Ana Bogdan, Kerber took down 18th seed Kiki Bertens, who had defeated her in the first round here two years ago, and then saw off seventh seed Caroline Garcia to make her second quarterfinal here, her first since 2012. In the quarterfinal, Kerber lost to top-ranked player and eventual champion Simona Halep from a set up. Nevertheless, the result is Kerber's equal-best result here, after her 2012 quarterfinal run.

Kerber started the grass court swing as the second seed in Mallorca, where she lost in the first round to Alison Riske. In Eastbourne, she made the semifinals, falling to eventual champion Caroline Wozniacki, Kerber entered Wimbledon as the 11th seed. She defeated 2010 finalist Vera Zvonareva and 2017 junior champion Claire Liu to reach the third round where she moved past 18th seed Naomi Osaka. She then saw off unseeded Belinda Bencic to make the last eight by when she was the highest seed left in the draw. There, she avenged her loss in Indian Wells earlier in the year to Daria Kasatkina, needing seven match points to seal the revenge and then defeated 12th seed Jeļena Ostapenko to reach her second Wimbledon final. There, in a rematch of the 2016 final, she turned the tides this time around by taking down 25th seed Serena Williams in straight sets for her third Grand Slam title and as a result, she became the only player to defeat Serena Williams in multiple Grand Slam finals apart from Venus Williams. Also, with this victory, Kerber found herself one Grand Slam tournament shy of a career Grand Slam, and also returned to world No. 4 in the rankings.

Kerber did not enjoy the same success moving to the US Open Series, suffering a trio of early losses. First, at the Canadian Open, fourth seed Kerber lost her opener to Alizé Cornet in straight sets. At the Cincinnati Open, Kerber lost in the third round to Keys. This culminated in third-round defeat in the hands of 29th seed Cibulková at the US Open despite having led by a set. However, her strong results in the preceding months of the year ensured her a spot at the WTA Finals, sealing her qualification on 10 September. The Asian swing in 2018 was another uneventful outing for Kerber as she lost in the third round of both Wuhan and Beijing, to Barty and Zhang Shuai, respectively.

In her fifth appearance at the season-ending WTA Finals, the final edition to be held in Singapore, Kerber was drawn into the same group as Osaka, Stephens and Bertens. There, she got her sole win of the tournament over the former, defeating the Japanese player in three sets. Kerber subsequently concluded 2018 as world No. 2, her second-best finish to a season.

In November, Kerber announced a new partnership with Rainer Schüttler as her new coach, having split with Fisette a month prior.

=== 2019–2020: Inconsistencies and out of top 20 ===
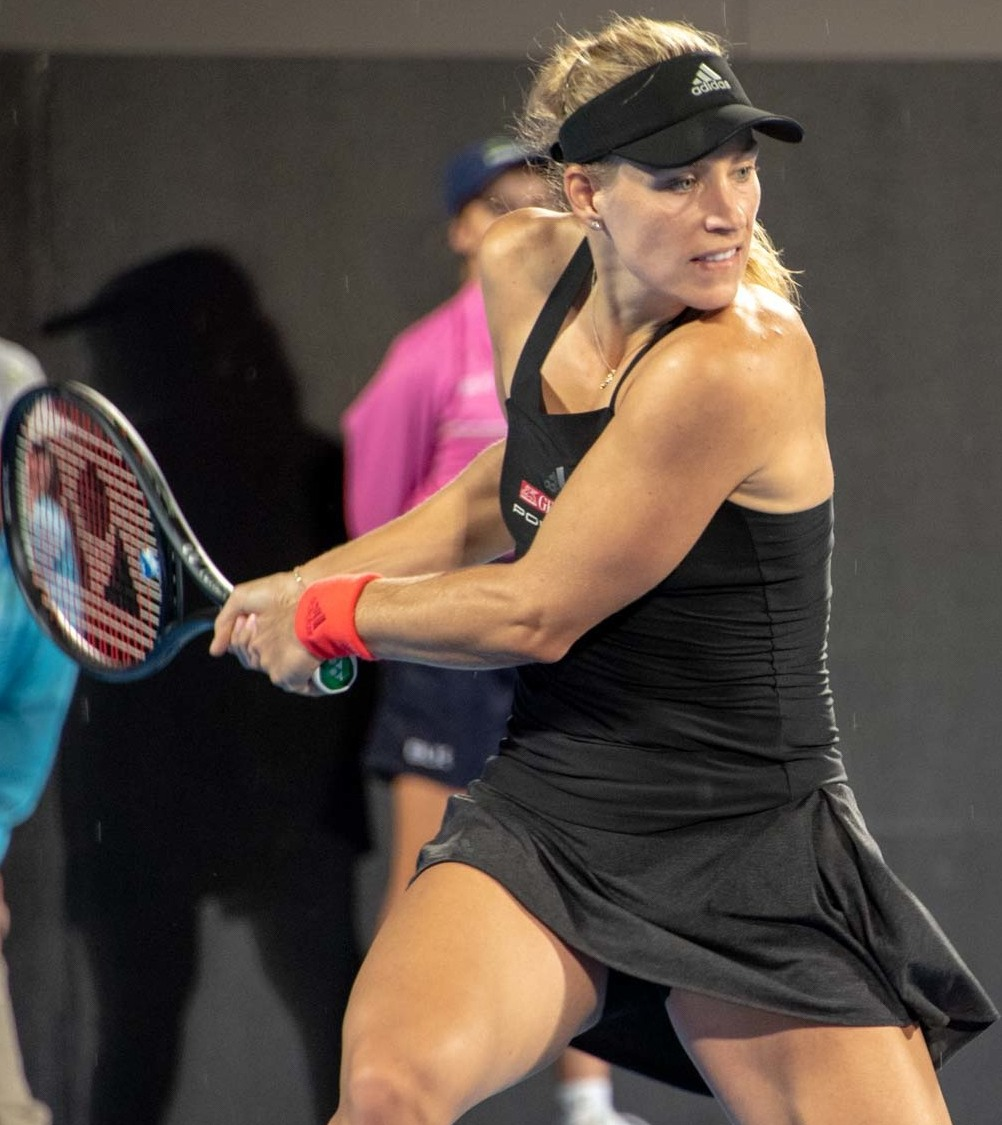
Kerber at the 2019 Sydney International

Kerber kicked off the 2019 season with her second appearance at the Hopman Cup, alongside Alexander Zverev once again; they lost in the final to Switzerland in a rematch of last year's final. In Sydney, Kerber failed in her title defence bid with a loss to eventual champion Petra Kvitová in the quarterfinals. At the Australian Open, second-seeded Kerber moved into the last 16 with straight-set wins over the likes of Polona Hercog, Beatriz Haddad Maia (gaining her 100th Grand Slam match win) and Kimberly Birrell, only to be upset by eventual semifinalist Danielle Collins in straight sets. The following month, Kerber made the semifinals at the Qatar Open where she lost to eventual champion Elise Mertens. At the Dubai Tennis Championships, Kerber lost in the third round to eventual semifinalist Hsieh Su-wei in three sets.

At the Indian Wells Open, Kerber reached a Premier Mandatory final for the first time in her career, which is also her first at the Premier Mandatory or Premier 5 stage since Cincinnati in 2016. En route to the final, she defeated Yulia Putintseva to begin, and followed up with two three-set wins over Natalia Vikhlyantseva and world No. 9 Aryna Sabalenka, which put her in the last eight. She then advanced to her first semifinal here since 2013 with a win over Venus Williams, where she saw off Belinda Bencic. In the final, young wildcard Bianca Andreescu defeated Kerber in three sets to win the title. At the Miami Open next, Kerber crossed paths with Andreescu once again, in the third round this time, and lost. in three sets. Kerber notably called her opponent "biggest drama queen ever" during their handshake after the match, owing to the multiple medical time-outs the latter had taken during the match. She then recorded a semifinal run at the Monterrey Open where she was the top seed but lost to Victoria Azarenka in three sets.

Kerber her clay season in Stuttgart where she made the quarterfinals, but then had to withdraw in the second round of Madrid, having defeated Lesia Tsurenko in straight sets prior, owing to an injury in her right thigh. At the French Open, Kerber lost in the first round to Russian youngster Anastasia Potapova. That match, notably, was the first one played on the newly rebuilt Court Philippe Chatrier. Her form would improve on grass, however, as she started out with a semifinal run in Mallorca where she was the top seed. She followed that up with a runner-up finish in Eastbourne, where she lost to Karolína Plíšková, their fifth encounter in a championship match. However, at Wimbledon, defending champion Kerber was shocked by lucky loser Lauren Davis in the second round. As a result of this defeat, she fell out of the top 10, and then parted ways with her coach Schüttler.

Kerber's dip in form stretched through the US Open Series as she was inflicted with a four-match losing streak, including a second-round loss at the US Open in the hands of Kristina Mladenovic. After that defeat, Kerber stated in her post-match interview that she had not reserved plans to find a new coach nor hire former coach Torben Beltz. At the Pan Pacific Open, Kerber won consecutive matches for the first time in three months by seeing off Americans in Nicole Gibbs and Madison Keys to reach the semifinals, where she lost to Anastasia Pavlyuchenkova in straight sets.

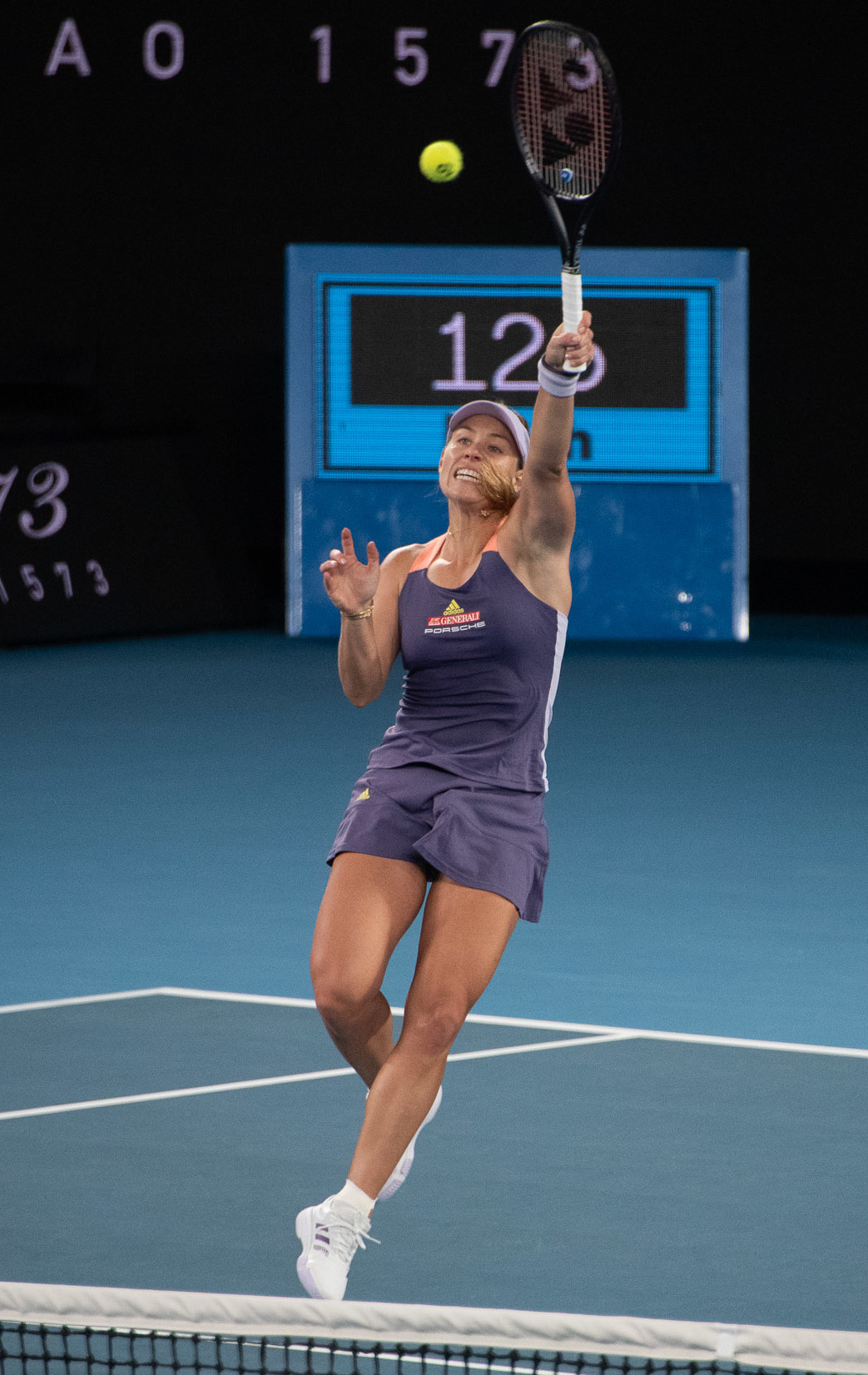
Kerber at the 2020 Australian Open

In her closing two events of 2019, the Wuhan and China Opens, Kerber managed just one win, over Zhang Shuai in the opening round of the latter. She subsequently withdrew from the Luxembourg Open and the Elite Trophy due to a leg injury, thus finishing the year as world No. 20. On 21 November, Kerber announced that she has hired former world No. 130 Dieter Kindlmann as her coach.

Kerber started her 2020 season in Brisbane, her last appearance here coming back in 2017. However, she was bounced in the opening round by home star Samantha Stosur in two tiebreak sets. Next, at the Adelaide International, she beat Wang Qiang in straight sets to open her tournament here before retiring against eventual runner-up Dayana Yastremska due to a left hamstring injury. At the Australian Open, 17th seed Kerber made the fourth round here for the seventh time in her career, but was defeated by 30th seed Anastasia Pavlyuchenkova in three sets. That was Kerber's last tournament appearance before the 2020 season went into a lockdown following the COVID-19 pandemic.

In late July, Kerber reunited with her former coach, Torben Beltz, with whom she captured her first two Grand Slam titles. Her first appearance since the tour suspension was lifted came at the US Open where she lost to eventual semifinalist Jennifer Brady in the fourth round. She finished her season with back-to-back defeats at the Italian and French Opens, in the hands of Siniaková and Kaja Juvan, respectively. She would subsequently end the year ranked world No. 25, her lowest since 2011.

=== 2021: Brief top 10 comeback ===
Kerber opened her 2021 season in Melbourne, entering the Gippsland Trophy, a modified warm-up tournament as part of the 2021 Melbourne Summer Series. However, it was later discovered that her flight to Melbourne carried a COVID-19 infected passenger, forcing her into a mandatory and strict hotel quarantine for two weeks which severely limited her practicing opportunities besides preventing her from participating in the aforementioned tournament.

The situation was, however, remedied with the creation of the Grampians Trophy. Seeded eighth, Kerber's run in this tournament returned wins over the likes of Kateřina Siniaková and Ons Jabeur before being defeated by Maria Sakkari in the quarterfinals. At the Australian Open, she crashed out in the opening round to fellow lefty Bernarda Pera in straight sets, citing her lack of preparedness from her strict quarantine.

The ensuing months of 2021, until the French Open in late May would prove to be a tough one for Kerber as she netted in just six wins across seven tournaments played, and winning consecutive matches on just one occasion in the same stretch, at the Italian Open, where she beat Alizé Cornet and defending champion Simona Halep, the latter via retirement, before taking a loss in the hands of Jeļena Ostapenko. At the French Open, she was bounced at the first hurdle here for the fifth time in past six appearances, this time to Ukraine's Anhelina Kalinina in straight sets.

Kerber's resurgence in 2021, however, did come, on the grass. After an early exit to Victoria Azarenka in Berlin, she won the title at the inaugural Bad Homburg Open, having need to come back from a set down in each of her quarterfinal and semifinal matches, against Amanda Anisimova and Petra Kvitová, respectively, to make her third final in a row on grass, and her first since Eastbourne two years ago. She defeated Siniaková in the final for her third title on grass, her first since Wimbledon in 2018 and the 13th of her career.

Seeded 25th at Wimbledon, Kerber navigated her way past the likes of Nina Stojanović, Sara Sorribes Tormo, Aliaksandra Sasnovich and 20th seed Coco Gauff to reach the quarterfinals here for the fifth time in her career. She then saw off 19th seed Karolína Muchová to advance to her fourth semifinal appearance here. There, she lost to world No. 1 and eventual champion Ashleigh Barty in straight sets, despite having served for the second set.

Kerber's first tournament of the year's US Open Series was the Cincinnati Open, where she defeated Maria Sakkari in the first round in straight sets, before recording her first win over Elina Svitolina in seven meetings in the second round. She next defeated Jeļena Ostapenko, despite twice being a break down in the third set, before advancing to the semifinal after Petra Kvitová retired from their quarterfinal match. The quarterfinal match against Petra Kvitová was Angelique Kerber's 1000th match in her professional career. In the semifinal, she notched her second loss in straight sets to again, eventual champion Barty.

As the 16th seed at the US Open, Kerber fought to take her campaign to the distance, but she was ultimately ousted in the round of 16, matching her performance from the preceding year. In a first-round thriller against Dayana Yastremska, Kerber was down a set and a break in the deciding set, but she was able to force a tiebreak after Yastremska was serving for the match; in the end, after dropping her serve just once in the tiebreak, she was able to take the match. Following a straight-set win over Anhelina Kalinina in the second round to avenge her loss in the French Open earlier in the year, she encountered Sloane Stephens, an opponent she had lost to on five prior occasions. Though Stephens took the first set, Kerber maintained her offensive tactics and won the match by taking the next two sets. The victory set her up for a match with Leylah Fernandez, who had just defeated defending champion Naomi Osaka; in a grueling three-set match that included a second set tiebreak, which saw Fernandez fight her way back into the match, Kerber lost the third set to end her road at the last Grand Slam of 2021.

Kerber took on her last tournament of the year at the Indian Wells Open. The defending finalist entered as the tenth seed and started her campaign with another grueling three-set match, this time in a rematch against Bad Homburg finalist Siniaková. After she lost the second set tiebreak, she was able to hold off Siniaková in the third set to take the match. She followed up the win with another three-set match that pit her against 2018 finalist Kasatkina; after decisively losing the second set, she saved break points when serving for the third set to win the match. Kerber then handed a straight-set loss to Ajla Tomljanović in the round of 16 to set up a first-time encounter with eventual champion Paula Badosa in the quarterfinals. Kerber dropped the first set and was down a double break in the second set but she saved match points to tie the set before Badosa broke her for a last time to win the match.

Due to her success throughout the season, Kerber returned to the top 10 for the first time since July 2019, reaching No. 9 on 1 November 2021.

=== 2022–2023: 14th career title and pregnancy ===
Kerber started off the year having to cancel her preparations for the first Grand Slam of the year when a positive test for coronavirus forced her to skip Sydney. Then, in the first round of the 2022 Australian Open, she fell to Kaia Kanepi by a score of 4–6, 3–6. Kerber then withdrew from Dubai and lost 6–4, 3–6, 2–6 against Jil Teichmann in Doha.

Kerber reached the fourth round for the fifth consecutive time at Indian Wells, defeating Zheng Qinwen and Daria Kasatkina. She lost 6–4, 2–6, 3–6 to eventual champion Iga Świątek. Kerber lost in Miami against eventual finalist Naomi Osaka in the first round, losing 2–6, 3–6.

Kerber began the spring clay season at the Billie Jean King Cup, playing for Germany against Kazakhstan. She lost both singles ties to Yulia Putintseva and Elena Rybakina. In both encounters, She won the first set, but went on to lose in three sets. She proceeded to lose 6–3, 4–6, 4–6 to Anett Kontaveit in Stuttgart, withdraw from the Madrid Open citing a cold, and lose 1–6, 4–6 to 15th seed, Coco Gauff in Rome.

In the week preceding Roland Garros, Kerber received a last minute wildcard in Strasbourg. Arriving with a six-match losing streak, she reached her 32nd career final defeating Diane Parry, Aliaksandra Sasnovich, Magda Linette, and Océane Dodin. In the final, Kerber defeated Kaja Juvan in a marathon match lasting 3 hours and 16 minutes to win her 14th career title. It was her first outdoor red clay title and her first clay title since her title defense at Stuttgart in 2016. With Kerber saving 2 match points and striking 83 winners to Juvan's 83, the match was considered one of the best matches of the year.

In Paris, Kerber lost in the third round to Aliaksandra Sasnovich in straight sets. Kerber began the grass court season at Bad Homburg as the defending champion. She lost to Alizé Cornet in three sets. At Wimbledon, Kerber was unable to defend her semifinalist points from 2021 due to the Belarusian and Russian ban from Wimbledon, resulting in her ranking dropping to world No. 25; she nevertheless lost in the third round to Elise Mertens in straight sets, who made 14 unforced errors compared to Kerber's 28. On August 24, she withdrew from the 2022 US Open after announcing her pregnancy, effectively ending her season. Unable to defend her semifinalist points from Cincinnati and her 4th round points from the US Open she won in 2021, alongside her 2021 BNP Paribas Open quarterfinal points dropping in October, Kerber finished the 2022 season ranked No. 103, her lowest year-end ranking since 2009. Kerber became unranked following Wimbledon in 2023.

=== 2024: Comeback, United Cup champion, retirement ===
After a year and a half hiatus, Kerber returned to the tour at the 2024 United Cup in Australia as part of Team Germany. In her first match since Wimbledon 2022, Kerber lost to Jasmine Paolini in straight sets, 4–6, 5–7, but won her mixed doubles encounter against Lorenzo Sonego and Angelica Moratelli, partnering with Alexander Zverev for the first time since 2019. She proceeded to lose her succeeding singles matches to Caroline Garcia and Maria Sakkari in the round robin and quarterfinals, respectively, as well as her mixed doubles match against Team France. Despite this, Team Germany qualified for the semifinals against Australia where Kerber defeated Ajla Tomljanović in three sets, saving two match points in the process and scoring a critical match that allowed Team Germany to qualify for the final against Team Poland. With the win, she recorded her first win since Wimbledon in 2022 and her first win in Australia since 2021. In the final, Kerber lost in straight sets, 3–6, 0–6, against world No. 1 Iga Świątek; Team Germany nevertheless went on to win the tournament after winning the final two matches. Due to the late conclusion in Sydney, Kerber withdrew from the Adelaide International. Kerber then headed to Melbourne, for the first time since 2022, with a protected ranking and lost to Danielle Collins in three sets, ending her Australian summer season.

At Indian Wells, Kerber reached the fourth round, defeating Petra Martić, tenth seed Jeļena Ostapenko, her first top-10 win in more than two years since 2021, and 17th seed Veronika Kudermetova, before losing to Caroline Wozniacki.

Kerber entered the 2024 Miami Open using her protected ranking, but lost in the first round to Sloane Stephens, a setback after a successful tournament at Indian Wells a week earlier.

She was given a wildcard entry to the 2024 Wimbledon Championships but lost in the first-round to Yulia Putintseva.

On 25 July 2024, Kerber announced that she would retire from professional tennis after the Paris Olympics, concluding a career spanning over two decades. She played her last match on 31 July 2024 at the Olympics where she reached the quarterfinals, losing to eventual Olympic champion Zheng Qinwen following a tight final set tiebreak during which Kerber saved three match points.

== Playing style ==
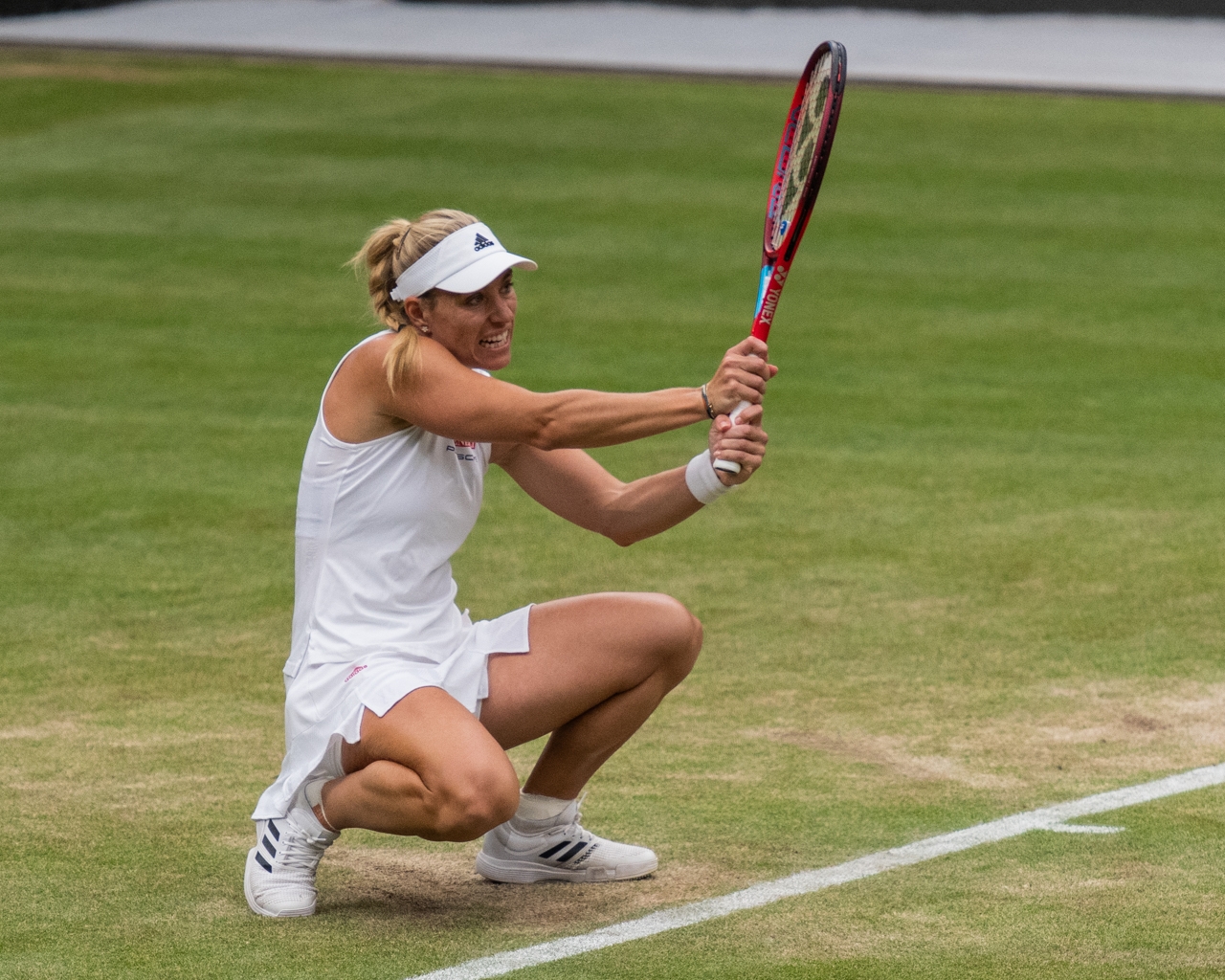
Kerber's squatting backhand position

Kerber is a defensive baseliner who has been noted for her speed, agility, athleticism, and footwork. She is known for her counterpunching style of play, extending rallies to attempt to draw an error out of more aggressive players, and to be able to hit low-risk winners with ease.

Kerber has powerful groundstrokes, allowing her to hit winners from frequently defensive positions. Her forehand is widely considered her most dangerous weapon, with her being able to hit powerful shots with disguise and speed; she is capable of hitting extreme angles with her forehand, which is responsible for many of the winners she accumulates on the court. Her forehand is hit with a short backswing, allowing her to flatten out her forehand, and generate considerable power. Her best shot is her forehand down-the-line. Kerber is known for hitting her backhand whilst squatting, allowing her to generate considerable power and to create sharp angles on the court; she typically utilises her backhand for defensive purposes, however. Her serve is considered her major weakness, rarely serving aces and hitting, on average, fewer service winners than many of her fellow players, with her first serve speed typically peaking at just 104 mph (167 km/h). Her second serve is a particular weakness, and is highly susceptible to attack, meaning that she rarely wins more than 50 percent of second serve points.

Although her serve is considered a weakness, Kerber is effective at returning serve and consistently ranks among the top 50 players in percentage of return points won. Despite her defensive style, she has had her best results when playing aggressively. Her favourite surface is grass, although she has also had success on hard courts.

== Personal life ==
Kerber is currently based in the Polish town of Puszczykowo, a suburb of Poznań, where her maternal grandfather owned an indoor tennis facility.

Kerber speaks German, Polish and English, and also holds dual German-Polish citizenship. She has competed for Germany throughout her career. In an interview, Kerber clarified that, despite strong Polish connection, she considers herself German: "I am German. I play for Germany, I grew up in Germany, and my heart beats for Germany".

A huge football fan, Kerber has cited German club FC Bayern Munich as her favourite team. Kerber has frequently cited former German tennis player Steffi Graf as her childhood idol and her motivation for pursuing tennis.

Kerber was raised Catholic, telling the magazine Emotion in 2020: "[F]aith is important to me... Christian values continue to shape me to this day. In difficult moments, faith in God is an anchor for me. Whereby faith has different forms for me and also comes into play in believing in oneself and one's own path".

On August 24, 2022, Kerber announced that she was taking a break from tennis due to pregnancy. Bild reports the father of Kerber's child is Franco Bianco, manager of a sporting facility in Königstein im Taunus. She gave birth to a daughter in 2023. In 2025, Kerber had her second child, a son.

== Endorsements ==
Kerber has endorsement deals with Adidas, her clothing and shoe sponsor, and Yonex, her racquet sponsor. Kerber uses a discontinued Yonex Vcore SI 100. In early 2015, she became global ambassador of Stuttgart car manufacturer Porsche. In late 2016 she signed a deal with insurance group Generali. In late 2016, she became beauty ambassador for the US cosmetics company Bare Minerals, a Shiseido brand. In 2017, she became the global brand ambassador for Australian health snack brand Slim Secrets and signed with both the Swiss luxury watchmaker Rolex and the software corporation SAP. Kerber has also been named ambassador for children's charity UNICEF. In August 2019, Kerber announced that she became a brand ambassador for Head and Shoulders Suprême. In November 2019, Kerber announced that she became a brand ambassador for Ole Lynggaard Copenhagen. In December 2019, she was named tournament ambassador of the inaugural Bad Homburg Open, which due to the COVID-19 pandemic, did not occur until 2021.

Her portfolio of endorsements has made her the second highest-paid female athlete in the world in the annual Forbes list of 2017.

== Coaches ==
Kerber has been coached in the past by Torben Beltz (2003—2004, 2011–2013, 2015–2017), Wim Fissette (November 2017–October 2018), Rainer Schüttler (November 2018–July 2019) and Dieter Kindlmann (November 2019–July 2020). In July 2020, she began working with Beltz once again, until they split in November 2021.

== Career statistics ==
=== Grand Slam singles performance timeline ===
Key
W	F	SF	QF	#R	RR	Q#	DNQ	A	NH

(W) winner; (F) finalist; (SF) semifinalist; (QF) quarterfinalist; (#R) rounds 4, 3, 2, 1; (RR) round-robin stage; (Q#) qualification round; (DNQ) did not qualify; (A) absent; (NH) not held; (SR) strike rate (events won / competed); (W–L) win–loss record.
To avoid confusion and double counting, these charts are updated at the conclusion of a tournament or when the player's participation has ended.

Tournament	2007	2008	2009	2010	2011	2012	2013	2014	2015	2016	2017	2018	2019	2020	2021	2022	2023	2024	SR	W–L	Win %
Australian Open	Q1	2R	1R	3R	1R	3R	4R	4R	1R	W	4R	SF	4R	4R	1R	1R	A	1R	1 / 16	32–15	68%
French Open	1R	1R	Q2	2R	1R	QF	4R	4R	3R	1R	1R	QF	1R	1R	1R	3R	A	1R	0 / 16	19–16	54%
Wimbledon	1R	1R	Q2	3R	1R	SF	2R	QF	3R	F	4R	W	2R	NH	SF	3R	A	1R	1 / 15	38–14	73%
US Open	1R	Q1	2R	1R	SF	4R	4R	3R	3R	W	1R	3R	1R	4R	4R	A	A	A	1 / 14	31–13	70%
Win–loss	0–3	1–3	1–2	5–4	5–4	14–4	10–4	12–4	6–4	20–2	6–4	18–3	4–4	6–3	8–4	4–3	0–0	0–3	3 / 61	120–58	67%

=== Grand Slam tournament finals ===
==== Singles: 4 (3 titles, 1 runner-up) ====
Result	Year	Championship	Surface	Opponent	Score
Win	2016	Australian Open	Hard	(United States) Serena Williams	6–4, 3–6, 6–4
Loss	2016	Wimbledon	Grass	(United States) Serena Williams	5–7, 3–6
Win	2016	US Open	Hard	(Czech Republic) Karolína Plíšková	6–3, 4–6, 6–4
Win	2018	Wimbledon	Grass	(United States) Serena Williams	6–3, 6–3

=== WTA Championships finals ===
==== Singles: 1 (runner-up) ====
Result	Year	Championship	Surface	Opponent	Score
Loss	2016	WTA Finals, Singapore	Hard (i)	(Slovakia) Dominika Cibulková	3–6, 4–6

=== Olympic finals ===
==== Singles: 1 (silver medal) ====
Result	Year	Location	Surface	Opponent	Score
Silver	2016	Rio Summer Olympics	Hard	(Puerto Rico) Monica Puig	4–6, 6–4, 1–6

== Awards and recognition ==
Kerber has received the following awards:

- WTA Player of the Year (2016)
- German Sportswoman of the Year (2016, 2018)
- US Open Sportsmanship Award (2016)
- ITF World Champion (2016)
- Nominated for the Laureus World Sports Award for Sportswoman of the Year (2016,18)
- Named among espnW's Impact25 (2016)
- Named among "Europe's 30 under 30" by Forbes (2017)
- World's second highest-paid female athlete by Forbes (2017)
- Nominated 2018 WTA Player of the Year

Sporting positions
Preceded by Serena Williams; Serena Williams; Serena Williams	World No. 1; 12 September 2016 – 30 January 2017; 20 March 2017 – 23 April 2017; 15 May 2017 – 16 July 2017	Succeeded by Serena Williams; Serena Williams; Karolína Plíšková
Awards and achievements
Preceded by Serena Williams	WTA Player of The Year; 2016	Garbiñe Muguruza
Preceded by Serena Williams	ITF World Champion; 2016	Garbiñe Muguruza
Preceded by Christina Schwanitz; Laura Dahlmeier	German Sportswoman of the Year; 2016; 2018	Laura Dahlmeier; Malaika Mihambo
