= 2024 United Cup =

- Date: 29 December 2023 – 7 January 2024
- Edition: 2nd
- Category: United Cup
- Draw: 18 teams
- Prize money: A$15,000,000 (US$10,000,000)
- Surface: Hard / outdoor
- Location: Perth, Western Australia; Sydney, New South Wales, Australia
- Venue: RAC Arena; Ken Rosewall Arena

Champions
- Germany
- United Cup

The 2024 United Cup was the second edition of the United Cup, an international outdoor hard court mixed-sex team tennis competition held by the Association of Tennis Professionals (ATP) and the Women's Tennis Association (WTA). Serving as the opener for the 2024 ATP Tour and the 2024 WTA Tour, it was held from 29 December 2023 to 7 January 2024 at two venues in the Australian cities of Perth and Sydney. It offered both ATP rankings and WTA rankings points to its players; a player was able to win a maximum of 500 points.

Team Germany defeated team Poland 2–1 in the final. Team Germany won the title after Alexander Zverev saved two match points in his singles tie against Hubert Hurkacz. All five of team Germany's matches were decided by the final mixed doubles match, with Zverev playing singles and doubles in all the ties. Team United States was the defending champion, but was eliminated in the group stage.

== Format ==
Both cities hosted three groups of three countries in a round robin format. Each tie consisted of one men's and one women's singles match, and one mixed doubles match.

The six group winners and the best runner-up in each city advanced to the quarterfinals.

== Qualification ==
18 countries qualified as follows:

- Six countries qualified based on the ATP ranking of their number one ranked singles player.
- Six countries qualified based on the WTA ranking of their number one ranked singles player.
- The final six countries qualified based on the combined ranking of their number one ranked ATP and WTA players.

In exchange for being the host nation, Australia was guaranteed one of the spots reserved for teams with the best combined ranking should they have failed to qualify on merit, though this was not needed as Australia qualified directly in the fourth ATP ranking spot.

Teams featured up to three players from each tour.

== Venues ==
Perth and Sydney hosted three groups of three countries in a round robin format and two quarterfinals. Sydney hosted the semifinals and the final on the last two days of the tournament.

Image	Name	Opened	Capacity	Location	Events	Map
	RAC Arena	2012	15,500	Perth, Western Australia	Group stage, Quarterfinals	2024 United Cup is located in Australia
	Ken Rosewall Arena	1999	10,500	Sydney, New South Wales	Group stage, Quarterfinals, Semifinals, Final	2024 United Cup is located in Australia

== ATP / WTA ranking points ==
Round	Points per win vs. opponent ranked						
Round	No. 1–10	No. 11–20	No. 21–30	No. 31–50	No. 51–100	No. 101–250	No. 251+
Final	180	140	120	90	60	40	35
Semifinals	130	105	90	60	40	35	25
Quarterfinals	80	65	55	40	35	25	20
Group stage	55	45	40	35	25	20	15

- Maximum 500 points
- WTA only: a player who won five matches received 500 points; a player who won four out of five matches received a minimum of 325 points.

== Prize money ==
The 2024 United Cup had a total prize money pool of US$10,000,000. This was 33.33% lower than 2023 due to fewer matches being played. The distribution was split into three components: participation fee, match wins, and team wins.

=== Participation fee ===
Singles ranking	Number 1 player	Number 2 player	Number 3 player
No. 1–10	$200,000	$200,000	$30,000
No. 11–20	$100,000	$100,000	$30,000
No. 21–30	$60,000	$50,000	$30,000
No. 31–50	$40,000	$30,000	$15,000
No. 51–100	$30,000	$20,000	$15,000
No. 101–250	$25,000	$15,000	$7,500
No. 251+	$20,000	$10,000	$6,000

=== Match wins ===
Round	Number 1 player	Mixed doubles
Final	$251,000	$47,255
Semifinals	$132,000	$24,750
Quarterfinals	$69,500	$13,000
Group stage	$38,325	$7,200

=== Team wins ===
Round	$ per player
Final	$23,155
Semifinals	$13,650
Quarterfinals	$8,025
Group stage	$5,000

== Entries ==
16 countries qualified based on their ATP/WTA singles rankings on 16 October 2023, and players' commitment to play at the event. The remaining two teams qualified based on their ATP/WTA rankings on 20 November.

The first 16 qualified countries, the best 5 by ATP ranking, the best 5 by WTA ranking, plus the best 6 in combined rankings were announced on 19 October 2023. The last 2 qualified countries, the 6th by ATP or WTA rankings, were announced on 21 November 2023.

Seed	Nation	Crit.	No. 1 ATP	Rank	No. 1 WTA	Rank	No. 2 ATP	No. 2 WTA	Doubles ATP	Doubles WTA	Captain	Nat.
1	Poland	WTA #1	Hubert Hurkacz	9	Iga Świątek	1	Daniel Michalski	Katarzyna Kawa	Jan Zieliński	Katarzyna Piter	Tomasz Wiktorowski	(Poland)
2	Greece	WTA #3	Stefanos Tsitsipas	6	Maria Sakkari	9	Stefanos Sakellaridis	Despina Papamichail	Petros Tsitsipas	Valentini Grammatikopoulou	Petros Tsitsipas	(Greece)
3	United States	WTA #2	Taylor Fritz	10	Jessica Pegula	5	Denis Kudla	Alycia Parks	Rajeev Ram	Desirae Krawczyk	David Witt	(United States)
4	France	WTA #5	Adrian Mannarino	22	Caroline Garcia	20	Antoine Escoffier	Amandine Hesse	Édouard Roger-Vasselin	Elixane Lechemia	Édouard Roger-Vasselin	(France)
5	Czech Republic	WTA #4	Jiří Lehečka	31	Markéta Vondroušová	7	Vít Kopřiva	Sára Bejlek	Petr Nouza	Miriam Kolodziejová	David Škoch	(Czech Republic)
6	Croatia	Comb #1	Borna Ćorić	37	Donna Vekić	23	Nino Serdarušić	Petra Marčinko	Ivan Dodig	Tena Lukas (Note: Singles 3 instead of Doubles)	Iva Majoli	(Croatia)
7	Canada	ATP #5	Félix Auger-Aliassime	29	Leylah Fernandez	35	Steven Diez	Stacey Fung	Adil Shamasdin	—	Adil Shamasdin	(Canada)
8	Great Britain	Comb #2	Cameron Norrie	18	Katie Boulter	56	Dan Evans	Francesca Jones	Neal Skupski	Maia Lumsden	Colin Beecher	(United Kingdom)
9	China	Comb #3	Zhizhen Zhang	58	Qinwen Zheng	15	Yunchaokete Bu	Xiaodi You	Fajing Sun	—	Di Wu	(China)
10	Netherlands	Comb #4	Tallon Griekspoor	23	Arantxa Rus	51	Thiemo de Bakker	Arianne Hartono	Wesley Koolhof	Demi Schuurs	Wesley Koolhof	(Netherlands)
11	Spain	Comb #5	Alejandro Davidovich Fokina	26	Sara Sorribes Tormo	48	Roberto Carballés Baena	Marina Bassols Ribera	David Vega Hernández	Rosa Vicens Mas	Jorge Aguirre	(Spain)
12	Italy	Comb #6	Lorenzo Sonego	46	Jasmine Paolini	30	Flavio Cobolli	Nuria Brancaccio	Andrea Pellegrino	Angelica Moratelli	Renzo Furlan	(Italy)
13	Serbia	ATP #1	Novak Djokovic	1	Olga Danilović	119	Hamad Medjedovic	Natalija Stevanović	Nikola Ćaćić	Dejana Radanović	Viktor Troicki	(Serbia)
14	Norway	ATP #2	Casper Ruud	11	Malene Helgø	542	Andreja Petrovic	Ulrikke Eikeri	—	—	Christian Ruud	(Norway)
15	Australia	ATP #4	Alex de Minaur	12	Ajla Tomljanović	33^{PR(291)}	John Millman	Storm Hunter	Matthew Ebden	Ellen Perez	Lleyton Hewitt	(Australia)
16	Germany	ATP #3	Alexander Zverev	7	Angelique Kerber	31^{PR(NR)}	Maximilian Marterer	Tatjana Maria	Kai Wehnelt	Laura Siegemund	Torben Beltz	(Germany)
17	Brazil	WTA #6	Thiago Seyboth Wild	79	Beatriz Haddad Maia	11	Felipe Meligeni Alves	Carolina Alves	Marcelo Melo	—	Rafael Paciaroni	(Brazil)
18	Chile	ATP #6	Nicolás Jarry	19	Daniela Seguel	668	Tomás Barrios Vera	Fernanda Labraña	Gonzalo Lama	—	Jaime Fillol	(Chile)

- Singles rankings are as of 25 December 2023.
- PR = Protected ranking
- NR = Not ranked

== Group stage ==
Qualified for the knockout stage (**in bold**)
Eliminated (in italics)

A country's position within its group is determined by number of ties won and ties played. If three teams are tied with the same number of tie wins, then the team having played fewer total matches (singles and mixed doubles) will be eliminated and the winner of the head-to-head matchup between the two remaining teams advance. If still tied then the following procedures decide the group order: the most match wins (singles and doubles), then the highest percentage of matches won, then percentage of sets and then games won.

=== Overview ===
G = Group, T = Ties, M = Matches, S = Sets

G	Winner				Runner-up				Third			
G	Country	T	M	S	Country	T	M	S	Country	T	M	S
A	Poland	2–0	5–1	11–3	Spain	1–1	3–3	6–7	Brazil	0–2	1–5	3–10
B	Greece	1–1	4–2	10–4	Chile	1–1	3–3	7–8	Canada	1–1	2–4	4–9
C	Australia	1–1	3–3	7–6	United States	1–1	3–3	7–7	Great Britain	1–1	3–3	7–8
D	France	2–0	5–1	11–5	**Germany**	1–1	3–3	8–8	Italy	0–2	1–5	4–10
E	Serbia	2–0	4–2	9–7	**China**	1–1	4–2	9–6	Czech Republic	0–2	1–5	6–11
F^{†}	Norway	1–1	3–3	7–7	Croatia	1–1	3–3	8–8	Netherlands	1–1	3–3	7–7

† Group F standings were determined by percentage of games won.

=== Group A ===
Host city: Perth

Pos.	Country	Ties W–L	Matches W–L	Sets W–L	Games W–L
1	**Poland**	2–0	5–1	11–3 (79%)	79–41 (66%)
2	Spain	1–1	3–3	6–7 (46%)	51–63 (45%)
3	Brazil	0–2	1–5	3–10 (23%)	49–75 (40%)

==== Spain vs. Brazil ====
Spain
2
RAC Arena
29 December 2023

Brazil
1

			1	2	3
1	(Spain) (Brazil)	**Alejandro Davidovich Fokina**; Thiago Seyboth Wild	**6**; 4	**6**; 0
2	(Spain) (Brazil)	Sara Sorribes Tormo; **Beatriz Haddad Maia**	6^{1} **7^{7}**	2; **6**
3	(Spain) (Brazil)	**Sara Sorribes Tormo / Alejandro Davidovich Fokina**; Beatriz Haddad Maia / Marcelo Melo	**6**; 4	**7**; 5

==== Poland vs. Brazil ====
Poland
3
RAC Arena
30 December 2023

Brazil
0

			1	2	3
1	(Poland) (Brazil)	**Iga Świątek**; Beatriz Haddad Maia	**6**; 2	**6**; 2
2	(Poland) (Brazil)	**Hubert Hurkacz**; Thiago Seyboth Wild	6^{4} **7^{7}**	**6**; 2	**6**; 3
3	(Poland) (Brazil)	**Iga Świątek / Hubert Hurkacz**; Beatriz Haddad Maia / Marcelo Melo	**6**; 4	**6**; 3

==== Poland vs. Spain ====
Poland
2
RAC Arena
1 January 2024

Spain
1

			1	2	3
1	(Poland) (Spain)	Hubert Hurkacz; **Alejandro Davidovich Fokina**	**6**; 3	3; **6**	4; **6**
2	(Poland) (Spain)	**Iga Świątek**; Sara Sorribes Tormo	**6**; 2	**6**; 1
3	(Poland) (Spain)	**Iga Świątek / Hubert Hurkacz**; Sara Sorribes Tormo / Alejandro Davidovich Fokina	**6**; 0	**6**; 0

=== Group B ===
Host city: Sydney

Pos.	Country	Ties W–L	Matches W–L	Sets W–L	Games W–L
1	**Greece**	1–1	4–2	10–4 (71%)	74–53 (58%)
2	Chile	1–1	3–3	7–8 (47%)	59–69 (46%)
3	Canada	1–1	2–4	4–9 (31%)	56–67 (46%)

==== Canada vs. Chile ====
Canada
2
Ken Rosewall Arena
31 December 2023

Chile
1

			1	2	3
1	(Canada) (Chile)	**Leylah Fernandez**; Daniela Seguel	**6**; 2	**6**; 3
2	(Canada) (Chile)	Steven Diez; **Nicolás Jarry**	5; **7**	4; **6**
3	(Canada) (Chile)	**Leylah Fernandez / Steven Diez**; Daniela Seguel / Tomás Barrios Vera	**7**; 5	4; **6**	**10**; 8

==== Greece vs. Chile ====
Greece
1
Ken Rosewall Arena
2 January 2024

Chile
2

			1	2	3
1	(Greece) (Chile)	**Maria Sakkari**; Daniela Seguel	**6**; 0	**6**; 1
2	(Greece) (Chile)	Stefanos Sakellaridis; **Nicolás Jarry**	3; **6**	**6**; 3	5; **7**
3	(Greece) (Chile)	Maria Sakkari / Stefanos Tsitsipas; **Daniela Seguel / Tomás Barrios Vera**	**7^{7}** 6^{5}	3; **6**	6; **10**

==== Greece vs. Canada ====
Greece
3
Ken Rosewall Arena
3 January 2024

Canada
0

			1	2	3
1	(Greece) (Canada)	**Stefanos Tsitsipas**; Steven Diez	**6**; 2	**6**; 3
2	(Greece) (Canada)	**Maria Sakkari**; Leylah Fernandez	**7^{7}** 6^{2}	**6**; 3
3	(Greece) (Canada)	**Despina Papamichail / Petros Tsitsipas**; Stacey Fung / Félix Auger-Aliassime	**7**; 5	**6**; 4

=== Group C ===
Host city: Perth

Pos.	Country	Ties W–L	Matches W–L	Sets W–L	Games W–L
1	**Australia**	1–1	3–3	7–6 (54%)	68–59 (54%)
2	United States	1–1	3–3	7–7 (50%)	60–72 (45%)
3	Great Britain	1–1	3–3	7–8 (47%)	75–72 (51%)

==== Great Britain vs. Australia ====
Great Britain
2
RAC Arena
29 December 2023

Australia
1

			1	2	3
1	(United Kingdom) (Australia)	**Cameron Norrie**; Alex de Minaur	**6**; 4	2; **6**	**7^{7}** 6^{2}
2	(United Kingdom) (Australia)	**Katie Boulter**; Ajla Tomljanović	**6**; 2	**6**; 4
3	(United Kingdom) (Australia)	Katie Boulter / Neal Skupski; **Storm Hunter / Matthew Ebden**	3; **6**	6^{5} **7^{7}**

==== United States vs. Great Britain ====
United States
2
RAC Arena
31 December 2023

Great Britain
1

			1	2	3
1	(United States) (United Kingdom)	Jessica Pegula; **Katie Boulter**	**7**; 5	4; **6**	4; **6**
2	(United States) (United Kingdom)	**Taylor Fritz**; Cameron Norrie	**7^{7}** 6^{5}	**6**; 4
3	(United States) (United Kingdom)	**Jessica Pegula / Taylor Fritz**; Katie Boulter / Neal Skupski	1; **6**	**7^{7}** 6^{4}	**10**; 7

==== United States vs. Australia ====
United States
1
RAC Arena
1 January 2024

Australia
2

			1	2	3
1	(United States) (Australia)	Taylor Fritz; **Alex de Minaur**	4; **6**	2; **6**
2	(United States) (Australia)	**Jessica Pegula**; Ajla Tomljanović	**7^{8}** 6^{6}	**6**; 3
3	(United States) (Australia)	Jessica Pegula / Rajeev Ram; **Storm Hunter / Matthew Ebden**	3; **6**	1; **6**

=== Group D ===
Host city: Sydney

Pos.	Country	Ties W–L	Matches W–L	Sets W–L	Games W–L
1	**France**	2–0	5–1	11–5 (69%)	78–71 (52%)
2	**Germany**	1–1	3–3	8–8 (50%)	77–66 (54%)
3	Italy	0–2	1–5	4–10 (29%)	63–81 (44%)

==== Italy vs. Germany ====
Italy
1
Ken Rosewall Arena
30 December 2023

Germany
2

			1	2	3
1	(Italy) (Germany)	**Jasmine Paolini**; Angelique Kerber	**6**; 4	**7**; 5
2	(Italy) (Germany)	Lorenzo Sonego; **Alexander Zverev**	**7^{7}** 6^{5}	3; **6**	4; **6**
3	(Italy) (Germany)	Angelica Moratelli / Lorenzo Sonego; **Angelique Kerber / Alexander Zverev**	3; **6**	0; **6**

==== France vs. Germany ====
France
2
Ken Rosewall Arena
1 January 2024

Germany
1

			1	2	3
1	(France) (Germany)	Adrian Mannarino; **Alexander Zverev**	**6**; 4	4; **6**	3; **6**
2	(France) (Germany)	**Caroline Garcia**; Angelique Kerber	1; **6**	**6**; 2	**6**; 2
3	(France) (Germany)	**Caroline Garcia / Édouard Roger-Vasselin**; Angelique Kerber / Alexander Zverev	**7^{7}** 6^{4}	2; **6**	**12**; 10

==== France vs. Italy ====
France
3
Ken Rosewall Arena
3 January 2024

Italy
0

			1	2	3
1	(France) (Italy)	**Adrian Mannarino**; Lorenzo Sonego	**6**; 4	**6**; 4
2	(France) (Italy)	**Caroline Garcia**; Jasmine Paolini	**6**; 4	5; **7**	**6**; 4
3	(France) (Italy)	**Elixane Lechemia / Édouard Roger-Vasselin**; Nuria Brancaccio / Flavio Cobolli	**7^{7}** 6^{5}	**6**; 4

=== Group E ===
Host city: Perth

Pos.	Country	Ties W–L	Matches W–L	Sets W–L	Games W–L
1	**Serbia**	2–0	4–2	9–7 (56%)	66–63 (51%)
2	**China**	1–1	4–2	9–6 (60%)	70–51 (58%)
3	Czech Republic	0–2	1–5	6–11 (35%)	61–83 (42%)

==== Czech Republic vs. China ====
Czech Republic
0
RAC Arena
30 December 2023

China
3

			1	2	3
1	(Czech Republic) (China)	Jiří Lehečka; **Zhang Zhizhen**	**7**; 5	3; **6**	4; **6**
2	(Czech Republic) (China)	Markéta Vondroušová; **Zheng Qinwen**	1; **6**	**6**; 2	1; **6**
3	(Czech Republic) (China)	Markéta Vondroušová / Jiří Lehečka; **Zheng Qinwen / Zhang Zhizhen**	1; **6**	2; **6**

==== China vs. Serbia ====
China
1
RAC Arena
31 December 2023

Serbia
2

			1	2	3
1	(China) (Serbia)	Zhang Zhizhen; **Novak Djokovic**	3; **6**	2; **6**
2	(China) (Serbia)	**Zheng Qinwen**; Olga Danilović	**6**; 4	**6**; 2
3	(China) (Serbia)	Zheng Qinwen / Zhang Zhizhen; **Olga Danilović / Novak Djokovic**	4; **6**	**6**; 1	6; **10**

==== Czech Republic vs. Serbia ====
Czech Republic
1
RAC Arena
2 January 2024

Serbia
2

			1	2	3
1	(Czech Republic) (Serbia)	**Markéta Vondroušová**; Olga Danilović	**6**; 1	3; **6**	**6**; 3
2	(Czech Republic) (Serbia)	Jiří Lehečka; **Novak Djokovic**	1; **6**	**7^{7}** 6^{3}	1; **6**
3	(Czech Republic) (Serbia)	Miriam Kolodziejová / Petr Nouza; **Olga Danilović / Hamad Medjedovic**	**6**; 4	6^{2} **7^{7}**	8; **10**

=== Group F ===
Host city: Sydney

Pos.	Country	Ties W–L	Matches W–L	Sets W–L	Games W–L
1	**Norway**	1–1	3–3	7–7 (50%)	66–63 (51%)
2	Croatia	1–1	3–3	8–8 (50%)	67–68 (50%)
3	Netherlands	1–1	3–3	7–7 (50%)	66–68 (49%)

==== Netherlands vs. Norway ====
Netherlands
2
Ken Rosewall Arena
30 December 2023

Norway
1

			1	2	3
1	(Netherlands) (Norway)	**Arantxa Rus**; Malene Helgø	**7^{7}** 6^{4}	**6**; 1
2	(Netherlands) (Norway)	Tallon Griekspoor; **Casper Ruud**	3; **6**	4; **6**
3	(Netherlands) (Norway)	**Demi Schuurs / Wesley Koolhof**; Ulrikke Eikeri / Casper Ruud	**7^{7}** 6^{5}	**7**; 5

==== Croatia vs. Norway ====
Croatia
1
Ken Rosewall Arena
1 January 2024

Norway
2

			1	2	3
1	(Croatia) (Norway)	**Donna Vekić**; Malene Helgø	**7**; 5	3; **6**	**6**; 3
2	(Croatia) (Norway)	Borna Ćorić; **Casper Ruud**	4; **6**	1; **6**
3	(Croatia) (Norway)	Donna Vekić / Ivan Dodig; **Ulrikke Eikeri / Casper Ruud**	2; **6**	**6**; 3	7; **10**

==== Croatia vs. Netherlands ====
Croatia
2
Ken Rosewall Arena
2 January 2024

Netherlands
1

			1	2	3
1	(Croatia) (Netherlands)	**Borna Ćorić**; Tallon Griekspoor	**7^{7}** 6^{4}	**6**; 4
2	(Croatia) (Netherlands)	**Donna Vekić**; Arantxa Rus	**6**; 2	3; **6**	**6**; 1
3	(Croatia) (Netherlands)	Donna Vekić / Ivan Dodig; **Demi Schuurs / Wesley Koolhof**	**7^{7}** 6^{3}	3; **6**	12; **14**

=== Ranking of second-placed teams ===
The best runner-up quarter-final spot is determined by the number of ties won and the number of ties played. In a tie between three teams, the team having played fewer total matches (singles and mixed doubles) will be eliminated and, if still tied then the team with the most match wins (singles and doubles). If still tied, then the ranking is determined by, in order: 1 the highest percentage of matches won 2 the highest percentage of sets won, and 3 the highest percentage of games won.

Host city: Perth

Pos.	Country	Ties W–L	Matches W–L	Sets W–L	Games W–L
1	**China**	1–1	4–2	9–6 (60%)	70–51 (58%)
2	United States	1–1	3–3	7–7 (50%)	60–72 (45%)
3	Spain	1–1	3–3	6–7 (46%)	51–63 (45%)

Host city: Sydney

Pos.	Country	Ties W–L	Matches W–L	Sets W–L	Games W–L
1	**Germany**	1–1	3–3	8–8 (50%)	77–66 (54%)
2	Croatia	1–1	3–3	8–8 (50%)	67–68 (50%)
3	Chile	1–1	3–3	7–8 (47%)	59–69 (46%)

== Knockout stage ==
=== Bracket ===
Quarterfinals
3 January – Perth
Poland	3
China	0
4 January – Sydney
France	2
Norway	1
3 January – Perth
Australia	3
Serbia	0
5 January – Sydney
Greece	1
Germany	2

Semifinals
6 January – Sydney
Poland	3
France	0
6 January – Sydney
Australia	1
Germany	2

Final
7 January – Sydney
Poland	1
Germany	2

=== Quarterfinals ===
==== Poland vs. China ====
Poland
3
Perth, RAC Arena
3 January 2024

China
0

			1	2	3
1	(Poland) (China)	Hubert Hurkacz; Zhang Zhizhen	6; 3	6; 4
2	(Poland) (China)	Iga Świątek; Zheng Qinwen	6; 2	6; 3
3	(Poland) (China)	Katarzyna Piter / Jan Zieliński; You Xiaodi / Sun Fajing	6; 3	5; 7	10; 7

==== France vs. Norway ====
France
2
Sydney, Ken Rosewall Arena
4 January 2024

Norway
1

			1	2	3
1	(France) (Norway)	Caroline Garcia; Malene Helgø	6; 2	6^{6} 7^{8}	7^{7} 6^{5}
2	(France) (Norway)	Adrian Mannarino; Casper Ruud	1; 6	4; 6
3	(France) (Norway)	Caroline Garcia / Édouard Roger-Vasselin; Ulrikke Eikeri / Casper Ruud	7; 5	6; 4

==== Australia vs. Serbia ====
Australia
3
Perth, RAC Arena
3 January 2024

Serbia
0

			1	2	3
1	(Australia) (Serbia)	Alex de Minaur; Novak Djokovic	6; 4	6; 4
2	(Australia) (Serbia)	Ajla Tomljanović; Natalija Stevanović	6; 1	6; 1
3	(Australia) (Serbia)	Storm Hunter / Matthew Ebden; Dejana Radanović / Nikola Ćaćić	6; 3	6; 3

==== Greece vs. Germany ====
Greece
1
Sydney, Ken Rosewall Arena
5 January 2024

Germany
2

			1	2	3
1	(Greece) (Germany)	Maria Sakkari; Angelique Kerber	6; 0	6; 3
2	(Greece) (Germany)	Stefanos Tsitsipas; Alexander Zverev	4; 6	4; 6
3	(Greece) (Germany)	Maria Sakkari / Petros Tsitsipas; Laura Siegemund / Alexander Zverev	3; 6	3; 6

=== Semifinals ===
==== Poland vs. France ====
Poland
3
Sydney, Ken Rosewall Arena
6 January 2024

France
0

			1	2	3
1	(Poland) (France)	Hubert Hurkacz; Adrian Mannarino	6; 3	7; 5
2	(Poland) (France)	Iga Świątek; Caroline Garcia	4; 6	6; 1	6; 1
3	(Poland) (France)	Katarzyna Kawa / Jan Zieliński; Elixane Lechemia / Édouard Roger-Vasselin	6; 3	6; 3

==== Australia vs. Germany ====
Australia
1
Sydney, Ken Rosewall Arena
6 January 2024

Germany
2

			1	2	3
1	(Australia) (Germany)	Ajla Tomljanović; Angelique Kerber	6; 4	2; 6	6^{7} 7^{9}
2	(Australia) (Germany)	Alex de Minaur; Alexander Zverev	5; 7	6; 3	6; 4
3	(Australia) (Germany)	Storm Hunter / Matthew Ebden; Laura Siegemund / Alexander Zverev	6^{2} 7^{7}	7^{7} 6^{2}	13; 15

=== Final ===
==== Poland vs. Germany ====
Poland
1
Sydney, Ken Rosewall Arena
7 January 2024

Germany
2

			1	2	3
1	(Poland) (Germany)	Iga Świątek; Angelique Kerber	6; 3	6; 0
2	(Poland) (Germany)	Hubert Hurkacz; Alexander Zverev	7^{7} 6^{3}	6^{6} 7^{8}	4; 6
3	(Poland) (Germany)	Iga Świątek / Hubert Hurkacz; Laura Siegemund / Alexander Zverev	4; 6	7; 5	4; 10
