= Torben Beltz =

German tennis coach

- Country (sports): Germany
- Born: 21 November 1976 (age 49)

Coaching career (2003–)
- Angelique Kerber (2003–2004, 2011–2013, 2015–2017, 2020–2021, 2024); Carina Witthöft (2014); Donna Vekić (2017–2020); Emma Raducanu (2021); Anett Kontaveit (2022)

Coaching achievements
- List of notable tournaments (with champion) 2016 Australian Open (Kerber); 2016 Wimbledon Runner-Up (Kerber); Olympic Silver Medal (Kerber); 2016 US Open (Kerber); 2016 WTA Finals Runner-up (Kerber)
- Last updated on: 27 July 2020.

Torben Beltz (born 21 November 1976) is a German tennis coach. Beltz is best known for having coached Angelique Kerber during her successful 2016 Australian Open and 2016 US Open campaigns.

== Coaching career ==
Beltz first started working with Angelique Kerber when the German turned professional in 2003. However, it was not until 2011 that Kerber made her career breakthrough, reaching the semi-finals of the 2011 US Open when ranked 92nd in the world. Since then, Kerber has achieved a multitude of successes on the WTA Tour, winning her first two career titles in 2012, reaching a then-career high ranking of world number five and qualifying for the prestigious WTA Tour Championships in Istanbul. Beltz then parted ways with Kerber at the end of 2013.

However, in the early part of 2015, Beltz was rehired as Kerber's coach after the German suffered from a series of poor results to start the season, including losing in the first round of the 2015 Australian Open and dropping out of the WTA's top 10 for the first time since 2012. Upon their reunion, Kerber rediscovered the form that catapulted her into the world's top 10, winning four titles but not being able to reach a Grand Slam quarter-final during the year.

Beltz has been credited with helping Kerber win her first Grand Slam title at the 2016 Australian Open, where the German defeated defending champion and then-world number one Serena Williams in the final in three sets. Kerber subsequently won the Olympic Silver Medal and a second Grand Slam title at the US Open (displacing Williams as the world number one in the process); in addition, she also finished runner-up at the WTA Finals and finished the year on top of the world rankings.

On November 16, 2017, Kerber announced on Twitter that she has parted with Beltz, and has hired Wim Fissette as her coach. Shortly after, Beltz accepted Donna Vekic's request to be her coach. They parted ways in July 2020 in a non-conventional manner with Beltz announcing the dissolution of their partnership via Twitter. Just over a week later, Beltz announced he would be rejoining Angelique Kerber's team. In November 2021, Beltz and Kerber announced that they had dissolved their partnership again, and a few days later, Beltz was announced as the new coach of Emma Raducanu. After her surprise win at the US Open under her previous short-term coach, Raducanu had wanted to find a coach with tour experience once that partnership ended; Mats Wilander opined that an elite coach like Beltz could not help an eighteen-year-old (as Raducanu was) who is already elite and instead discovering their own game. After only five months of working together, Raducanu announced a departure from Torben Beltz.
