= Ole Lynggaard Copenhagen =

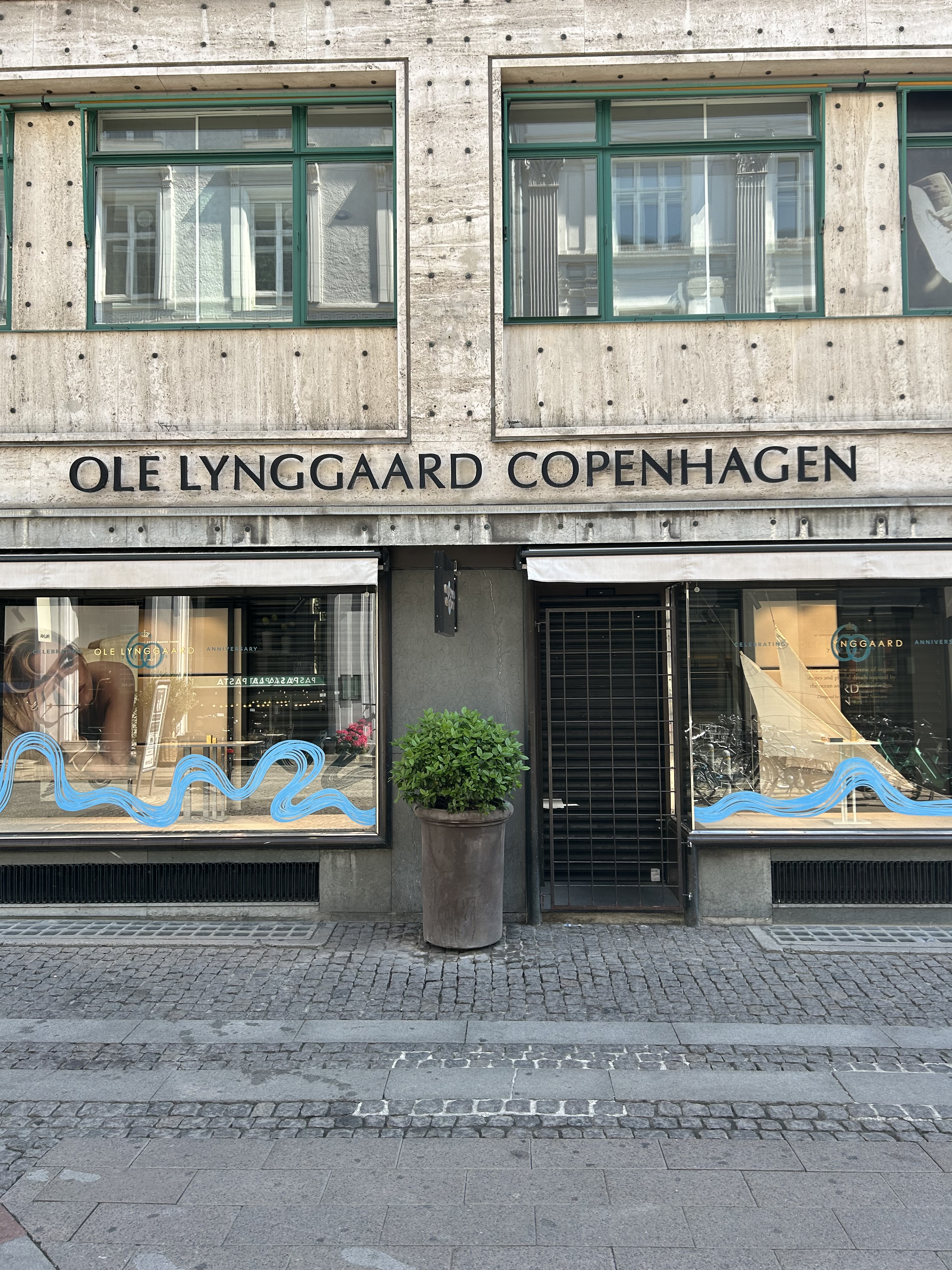
Ole Lynggaard Copenhagen flagship store

Ole Lynggaard Copenhagen was established in Copenhagen in 1963 by Danish goldsmith and fine jewellery designer Ole Lynggaard. Lynggaard studied in Germany, Paris, New York, San Francisco and Japan, before coming back to Denmark where he rented a combined workshop and office space.

Creative director and daughter of Ole Lynggaard, Charlotte Lynggaard, who is a goldsmith and jewellery designer like her father, joined the company in 1987. Søren Lynggaard, son of Ole Lynggaard, also joined the company in 1994 and has been CEO since 2003, while Michel Normann, Charlotte Lynggaard's husband, became CCO in 2006. Hanna Lynggaard, Søren Lynggaard's wife, joined the company's sales team in 2008, and is now Retail Manager.

With more than 100 employees in the Copenhagen-based atelier, all jewellery is designed by the father-daughter duo and made by a team of 40 goldsmiths working in the brand workshops, and by close partners outside Copenhagen.
