= 2011 Brisbane International – Men's singles qualifying =

Coordinates: 27°31′30″S 153°0′26″E

Men's singles qualifying
- 2011 Brisbane International

Events
Singles	men	women
Doubles	men	women
- Brisbane International

The 2011 Brisbane International was a joint ATP and WTA tennis tournament, played on outdoor hard courts. It was the 3rd edition of the tournament and took place at the Queensland Tennis Centre in Tennyson, Brisbane.

== Players ==
=== Seeds ===
1. (France) Adrian Mannarino (qualifier)
2. (Lithuania) Ričardas Berankis (qualifier)
3. (United States) Michael Russell (first round, retired)
4. (Germany) Simon Greul (first round)
5. (Austria) Stefan Koubek (second round)
6. (Australia) Peter Luczak (qualifying round, lucky loser)
7. (Kazakhstan) Evgeny Korolev (first round)
8. (Slovenia) Grega Žemlja (second round)

=== Qualifiers ===
1. (France) Adrian Mannarino
2. (Lithuania) Ričardas Berankis
3. (United States) Ryan Harrison
4. (Australia) Matthew Ebden

=== Lucky losers ===
1. (Australia) Peter Luczak

== Draw ==
Key

- Q = Qualifier
- WC = Wild card
- LL = Lucky loser
- Alt = Alternate
- ITF = ITF entry
- PR = Protected ranking
- SR = Special ranking
- SE = Special exempt
- JE = Junior exempt
- JR = Junior Accelerator Programme entrant
- CO = College Accelerator Programme entrant
- NG = Next Gen Accelerator Program entrant
- w/o = Walkover
- r = Retired
- d = Defaulted

=== First qualifier ===
First round
1	(France) Adrian Mannarino	7	6^{3}	7
(Australia) Carsten Ball	5	7	6^{7}
(Canada) Peter Polansky	6	6^{5}	6
WC	(Australia) Benjamin Mitchell	1	7	3
(Ukraine) Ivan Sergeyev	5	5
(Japan) Tatsuma Ito	7	7
(Colombia) Juan Sebastián Cabal	0	3
5	(Austria) Stefan Koubek	6	6

Second round
1	(France) Adrian Mannarino	6	6
(Canada) Peter Polansky	4	4
(Japan) Tatsuma Ito	6^{3}	6	6
5	(Austria) Stefan Koubek	7	1	4

Qualifying round
1	(France) Adrian Mannarino	7	4	6
(Japan) Tatsuma Ito	5	6	3

=== Second qualifier ===
First round
2	(Lithuania) Ričardas Berankis	6^{4}	6	6
(Monaco) Jean-Rene Lisnard	7	1	3
(Australia) Brydan Klein	6	4	3
(Italy) Marco Crugnola	3	6	6
WC	(Australia) James Duckworth	3	4
(Russia) Dmitry Tursunov	6	6
(Austria) Alexander Peya	6	1	4
6	(Australia) Peter Luczak	4	6	6

Second round
2	(Lithuania) Ričardas Berankis	6	6
(Italy) Marco Crugnola	3	3
(Russia) Dmitry Tursunov	6	6^{6}	4
6	(Australia) Peter Luczak	4	7	6

Qualifying round
2	(Lithuania) Ričardas Berankis	6	5	6
6	(Australia) Peter Luczak	3	7	2

=== Third qualifier ===
First round
3	(United States) Michael Russell	0^{r}
(United States) Ryan Harrison	4
(Colombia) Robert Farah	2	0
(Germany) Matthias Bachinger	6	6
(Germany) Dieter Kindlmann	1	3
(Estonia) Jürgen Zopp	6	6
(United States) Bobby Reynolds	6	6
7	(Kazakhstan) Evgeny Korolev	1	2

Second round
(United States) Ryan Harrison	6	6
(Germany) Matthias Bachinger	4	4
(Estonia) Jürgen Zopp	6	6
(United States) Bobby Reynolds	4	4

Qualifying round
(United States) Ryan Harrison	2	7	6
(Estonia) Jürgen Zopp	6	6^{2}	4

=== Fourth qualifier ===
First round
4	(Germany) Simon Greul	6^{2}	3
WC	(Australia) Greg Jones	7	6
(Germany) Bastian Knittel	6	4	6
(Czech Republic) Dušan Lojda	1	6	3
WC	(Australia) Matthew Ebden	6	4	7
(Romania) Victor Crivoi	2	6	5
WC	(Australia) Samuel Groth	3	6	4
8	(Slovenia) Grega Žemlja	6	3	6

Second round
WC	(Australia) Greg Jones	6	7
(Germany) Bastian Knittel	3	6^{5}
WC	(Australia) Matthew Ebden	5	7	6
8	(Slovenia) Grega Žemlja	7	6	4

Qualifying round
WC	(Australia) Greg Jones	4	1
WC	(Australia) Matthew Ebden	6	6
