= 2014 Brisbane International =

Coordinates: 27°31′30″S 153°0′26″E

- Date: 29 December 2013 – 5 January 2014
- Edition: 6th
- Location: Tennyson, Brisbane, Queensland
- Venue: Queensland Tennis Centre

Champions

Men's singles
- (Australia) Lleyton Hewitt

Women's singles
- (United States) Serena Williams

Men's doubles
- (Poland) Mariusz Fyrstenberg / (Canada) Daniel Nestor

Women's doubles
- (Russia) Alla Kudryavtseva / (Australia) Anastasia Rodionova
- Brisbane International

The 2014 Brisbane International was a joint 2014 ATP World Tour and 2014 WTA Tour tennis tournament, played on outdoor hard courts in Brisbane, Queensland, Australia. It was the sixth edition of the tournament and took place at the Queensland Tennis Centre in Tennyson. It was held from 29 December 2013 to 5 January 2014 and was part of the Australian Open Series in preparation for the first Grand Slam of the year.

In a major coup for the tournament, it was announced on 24 July 2013 that former world no. 1 and 17-time Grand Slam champion Roger Federer had committed to the event for the first time, thus breaking from his tradition of beginning the season in the Middle East. This announcement was dubbed "the biggest announcement in the history of the Brisbane International". Defending champion Serena Williams, two-time Australian Open champion Victoria Azarenka, 2013 Wimbledon finalist Sabine Lisicki, former world number ones Caroline Wozniacki and Jelena Janković and former ATP world No. 1 Lleyton Hewitt were also big drawcards for the event.

== Points and prize money ==
=== Point distribution ===
Event	W	F	SF	QF	Round of 16	Round of 32	Q	Q3	Q2	Q1
Men's singles	250	150	90	45	20	0	12	6	0	0
Men's doubles	250	150	90	45	0	—N/a	—N/a	—N/a	—N/a	—N/a
Women's singles	470	305	185	100	55	1	25	18	13	1
Women's doubles	470	305	185	100	1	—N/a	—N/a	—N/a	—N/a	—N/a

=== Prize money ===
Event	W	F	SF	QF	Round of 16	Round of 32^{1}	Q3	Q2	Q1
Men's singles	$82,040	$43,210	$23,405	$13,335	$7,860	$4,655	$750	$360	—N/a
Men's doubles *	$24,920	$13,100	$7,100	$4,060	$2,380	—N/a	—N/a	—N/a	—N/a
Women's singles	$196,670	$104,890	$56,298	$21,780	$11,681	$6,371	$3,327	$1,770	$1,003
Women's doubles *	$44,835	$23,597	$12,979	$6,607	$3,581	—N/a	—N/a	—N/a	—N/a

_{^{1} Qualifiers prize money is also the Round of 32 prize money}
_{* per team}

== ATP singles main-draw entrants ==
=== Seeds ===
Country	Player	Rank^{1}	Seed
SUI	Roger Federer	6	1
JPN	Kei Nishikori	17	2
FRA	Gilles Simon	19	3
RSA	~~Kevin Anderson~~ (withdrew)	20	4
BUL	Grigor Dimitrov	23	5
ESP	Feliciano López	28	6
RUS	Dmitry Tursunov	29	7
FRA	Jérémy Chardy	34	8

- ^{1} Rankings as of 23 December 2013

=== Other entrants ===
The following players received wildcards into the singles main draw:

- (Australia) James Duckworth
- (Australia) Samuel Groth

The following players received entry from the qualifying draw:

- (Australia) Thanasi Kokkinakis
- (Japan) Yūichi Sugita
- (United States) Ryan Harrison
- (Romania) Marius Copil

The following players received entry as a lucky losers:

- (France) Pierre-Hugues Herbert
- (United States) Alex Kuznetsov

=== Withdrawals ===
Before the tournament

- (South Africa) Kevin Anderson (illness) → replaced by (France) Pierre-Hugues Herbert
- (Australia) Nick Kyrgios (shoulder injury) → replaced by (United States) Alex Kuznetsov
- (Austria) Jürgen Melzer → replaced by (Australia) Matthew Ebden

== ATP doubles main-draw entrants ==
=== Seeds ===
Country	Player	Country	Player	Rank^{1}	Seed
NED	Jean-Julien Rojer	ROU	Horia Tecău	38	1
POL	Mariusz Fyrstenberg	CAN	Daniel Nestor	45	2
GBR	Jamie Murray	AUS	John Peers	59	3
COL	Juan Sebastián Cabal	COL	Robert Farah	91	4

- ^{1} Rankings as of 23 December 2013

=== Other entrants ===
The following pairs received wildcards into the doubles main draw:

- (Australia) Matthew Ebden / (Australia) Thanasi Kokkinakis
- (Australia) Chris Guccione / (Australia) Lleyton Hewitt

== WTA singles main-draw entrants ==
=== Seeds ===
Country	Player	Rank^{1}	Seed
USA	Serena Williams	1	1
BLR	Victoria Azarenka	2	2
RUS	Maria Sharapova	4	3
SRB	Jelena Janković	8	4
GER	Angelique Kerber	9	5
~~DEN~~	~~Caroline Wozniacki~~	~~10~~	~~6~~
GER	Sabine Lisicki	15	7
ESP	Carla Suárez Navarro	17	8
SVK	Dominika Cibulková	23	9

- ^{1} Rankings as of 23 December 2013

=== Other entrants ===
The following players received wildcards into the singles main draw:

- (Australia) Casey Dellacqua
- (Australia) Olivia Rogowska

The following players received entry from the qualifying draw:

- (Australia) Ashleigh Barty
- (Russia) Alla Kudryavtseva
- (Russia) Alexandra Panova
- (United Kingdom) Heather Watson

The following player received entry as a lucky loser:

- (Chinese Taipei) Hsieh Su-wei

=== Withdrawals ===
Before the tournament

- (Denmark) Caroline Wozniacki (shoulder injury) → replaced by (Chinese Taipei) Hsieh Su-wei

During the tournament

- (Australia) Ashleigh Barty (left abductor injury)
- (Germany) Sabine Lisicki (illness)

=== Retirements ===
- (Russia) Anastasia Pavlyuchenkova (left thigh injury)

== WTA doubles main-draw entrants ==
=== Seeds ===
Country	Player	Country	Player	Rank^{1}	Seed
CZE	Květa Peschke	SLO	Katarina Srebotnik	22	1
TPE	Hsieh Su-wei	SRB	Jelena Janković	23	2
AUS	Ashleigh Barty	AUS	Casey Dellacqua	23	3
TPE	Chan Hao-ching	USA	Liezel Huber	48	4

- ^{1} Rankings as of 23 December 2013

=== Other entrants ===
The following pairs received wildcards into the doubles main draw:

- (Australia) Olivia Rogowska / (Australia) Monique Adamczak
- (Italy) Francesca Schiavone / (Spain) Carla Suárez Navarro

=== Withdrawals ===
During the tournament

- (Australia) Ashleigh Barty (left adductor injury)

== Champions ==
=== Men's singles ===
- (Australia) Lleyton Hewitt def. (Switzerland) Roger Federer, 6–1, 4–6, 6–3

=== Women's singles ===
- (United States) Serena Williams def. (Belarus) Victoria Azarenka, 6–4, 7–5

=== Men's doubles ===
- (Poland) Mariusz Fyrstenberg / (Canada) Daniel Nestor def. (Colombia) Juan Sebastián Cabal / (Colombia) Robert Farah, 6–7^{(4–7)}, 6–4, [10–7]

=== Women's doubles ===
- (Russia) Alla Kudryavtseva / (Australia) Anastasia Rodionova def. (France) Kristina Mladenovic / (Kazakhstan) Galina Voskoboeva, 6–3, 6–1
