= 2011 Brisbane International =

Coordinates: 27°31′30″S 153°0′26″E

- Date: 2–9 January 2011
- Edition: 3rd
- Surface: Hard / outdoor
- Location: Brisbane, Australia
- Venue: Queensland Tennis Centre

Champions

Men's singles
- (Sweden) Robin Söderling

Women's singles
- (Czech Republic) Petra Kvitová

Men's doubles
- (Czech Republic) Lukáš Dlouhý / (Australia) Paul Hanley

Women's doubles
- (Russia) Alisa Kleybanova / (Russia) Anastasia Pavlyuchenkova
- Brisbane International

The 2011 Brisbane International was a joint ATP and WTA tennis tournament, played on outdoor hard courts in Brisbane, Queensland in Australia. It was the 3rd edition of the tournament and took place at the Queensland Tennis Centre in Tennyson and was held from 2 to 9 January 2011. It was part of the Australian Open Series in preparation for the first grandslam of the year.

During the tournament, $10 was donated for every ace to the fund supporting the current Queensland floods, which was unfolding during the tournament.

== Finals ==
=== Men's singles ===
(Sweden) Robin Söderling defeated (United States) Andy Roddick, 6–3, 7–5

- It was Soderling's 1st title of the year and 7th of his career.

=== Women's singles ===
(Czech Republic) Petra Kvitová defeated (Germany) Andrea Petkovic, 6–1, 6–3

- It was Kvitová's 1st title of the year and the 2nd of her career.

=== Men's doubles ===
(Czech Republic) Lukáš Dlouhý / (Australia) Paul Hanley defeated (Sweden) Robert Lindstedt / (Romania) Horia Tecău, 6–4, retired.

=== Women's doubles ===
(Russia) Alisa Kleybanova / (Russia) Anastasia Pavlyuchenkova defeated (Poland) Klaudia Jans / (Poland) Alicja Rosolska, 6–3, 7–5

== ATP entrants ==
=== Seeds ===
Country	Player	Rank	Seed
SWE	Robin Söderling	5	1
USA	Andy Roddick	8	2
ESP	Fernando Verdasco	9	3
USA	Mardy Fish	16	4
CYP	Marcos Baghdatis	20	5
ESP	Feliciano López	32	6
GER	Florian Mayer	37	7
UZB	Denis Istomin	40	8

- Rankings are as of 27 December 2010

=== Other entrants ===
The following players received wildcards into the singles main draw:

- (Australia) Marinko Matosevic
- (Australia) John Millman
- (Australia) Bernard Tomic

The following players received entry from the qualifying draw:

- (Lithuania) Ričardas Berankis
- (Australia) Matthew Ebden
- (United States) Ryan Harrison
- (France) Adrian Mannarino

The following players received entry as a lucky loser into the singles main draw:

- (Australia) Peter Luczak

== WTA entrants ==
=== Seeds ===
Country	Player	Rank	Seed
AUS	Samantha Stosur	6	1
ISR	Shahar Pe'er	13	2
RUS	Nadia Petrova	15	3
FRA	Marion Bartoli	16	4
RUS	Anastasia Pavlyuchenkova	21	5
ITA	Flavia Pennetta	24	6
RUS	Alisa Kleybanova	25	7
ROU	Alexandra Dulgheru	29	8

- Rankings as of 27 December 2010.

=== Other entrants ===
The following players received wildcards into the singles main draw:

- (Australia) Jelena Dokić
- (Australia) Sophie Ferguson
- (Australia) Sally Peers

The following players received entry from the qualifying draw:

- (Czech Republic) Lucie Hradecká
- (United States) Vania King
- (Russia) Anastasia Pivovarova
- (Georgia (country)) Anna Tatishvili

The following players received the lucky loser spots:

- (United States) Christina McHale
- (Russia) Ksenia Pervak
