= Taiyo Kogyo Corporation =

Japanese construction engineering company

- Native name: 太陽工業株式会社
- Type: Private (K.K)
- Industry: Construction; Engineering
- Founded: 1922; 104 years ago
- Headquarters: Setagaya-ku, Tokyo 154-0001; Yodogawa-ku, Osaka 532-0012, Japan
- Area served: Worldwide
- Key people: Hidefumi Araki (President)
- Services: Civil engineering design; Construction
- Website: Official website

Taiyo Kogyo Corporation (太陽工業株式会社, Taiyō Kōgyō Kabushiki-gaisha), based in Tokyo and Osaka, Japan, is a specialty contractor for the design, engineering, fabrication and installation of tensile membrane structures.

== History ==
Founded in 1922 as Nohmura Tent Company, the company faced setbacks during World War II, but nonetheless was reconstructed in August 1946 as Nohmura Sewing Factory, eventually renaming its business to Taiyo Kogyo Corporation. Its headquarters are located in Tokyo and Osaka, Japan. Currently, Taiyo Kogyo has 37 subsidiaries across 13 countries.

== Product lines ==
- Tensile membrane structures
- ETFE structures
- PTFE structures
- Textile interiors
- Textile façades
- Tent warehouses
- Civil engineering projects
- Taiyo Multipurpose Truss Space frame structures
- Logistic systems
- Fresh conditioning transportation system
- Transparent Photovoltaic glass

== Domestic subsidiaries ==
- Taiyo Tent Hokuriku Co., Ltd.
- Fukui Taiyo Co., Ltd.
- Taiyo Tent Kantoh co., Ltd.
- Meihan Tekko Co., Ltd.
- Transport & Distribution Service, Inc.
- Higashi-Nihon Container Service Co., Ltd.
- Naka-Nihon Container Service Co., Ltd.
- Osaka Container Service Co., Ltd.
- Mizushima Container Service Co., Ltd.
- Kitakyushu Container Service Co., Ltd.
- Taiyokogyo Geo Techno Service Co., Ltd.
- Taiyo Enesys, Inc.
- Kansai Taiyo Tent co., Ltd.
- Depotrent Inc.
- Dououkentetsu corporation
- En-T Design Co., Ltd
- TSP Taiyo Inc.
- Actio Corporation
- FESTAL-KANSAI, Co., Ltd.
- FESTAL-KANTO, Co., Ltd.
- Rentool Taiyo Co., Ltd.

== Overseas subsidiaries ==
=== Birdair ===
Logo of Birdair, Inc.

Birdair was founded in 1957 in Buffalo, New York by Walter Bird. The company first began building radomes and rapid deployment command shelters and then branched into 1200 major installations in more than 30 countries, requiring over 30,000,000 square feet (2,800,000 m^{2}) of architectural fabric membrane.

In 1992 the company became a division of Taiyo Kogyo Corporation.

In addition to its high-profile structures it deploys collapsible umbrellas for restaurants and non-collapsible umbrellas for bigger projects through its Birdair Architectural Umbrellas subdivision.

Its headquarters is in the Buffalo suburb of Amherst, New York.

=== MakMax Australia ===
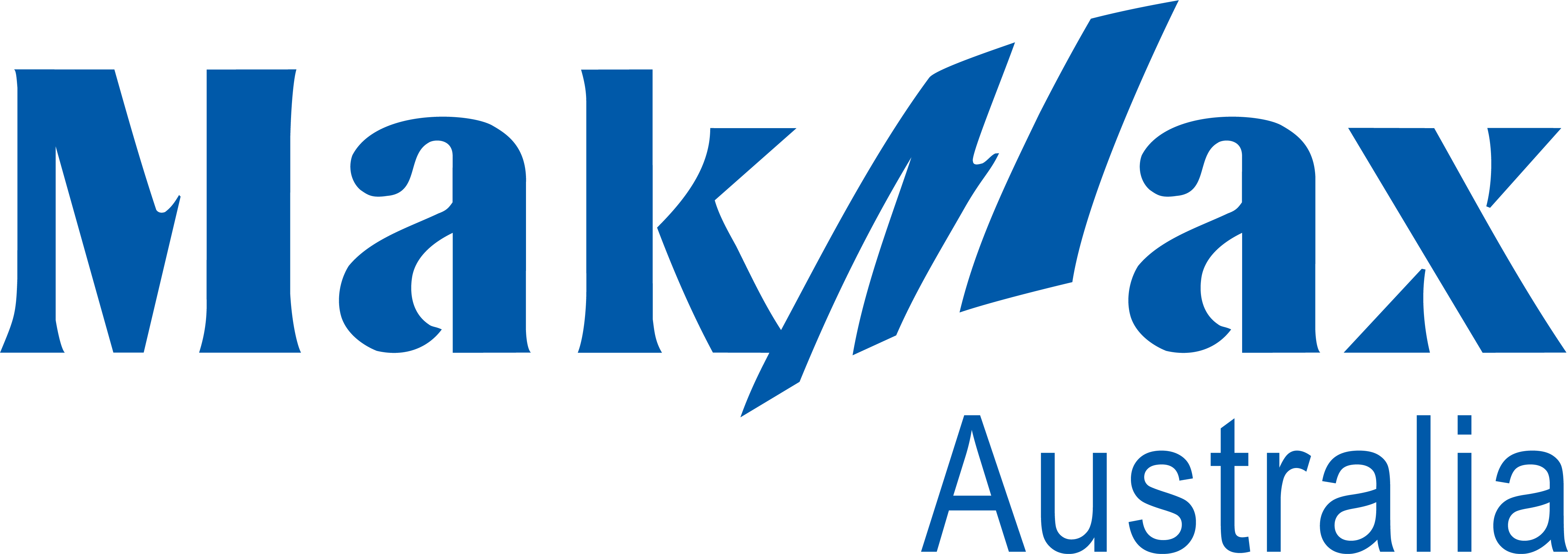

MakMax Australia is a supplier of tensile membrane structures within Australia and the Oceania region. Trading as MakMax Australia, the head office is located in the largely industrial area of Eagle Farm, north-east of the Brisbane CBD in Queensland Australia.

MakMax Australia was formed in 1984 in Australia under the name Shade Structures Pacific and originally raised to prominence through its innovative shade structures for the 1988 World Expo in Brisbane. The company joined the Taiyo Kogyo Group after it joined with USA Company Birdair Inc in 2001 and became Shade Structures Birdair.

In 2003 Shade Structures Birdair was transferred to Taiyo Kogyo Corporation and the company was changed to Taiyo Membrane Corporation. In 2007 Taiyo Membrane Corporation changed their Australian trading name to MakMax Australia whilst still trading under Taiyo Membrane Corporation internationally.

=== Taiyo Middle East LLC ===
Taiyo Middle East LLC or TME was established in 2003 in U.A.E to better serve middle east market, since then it has successfully completed more than 200 projects in the middle east region among them many landmarks such as recent iaa Award of Excellence on its project Al Wasl Dome in EXPO2020 Dubai

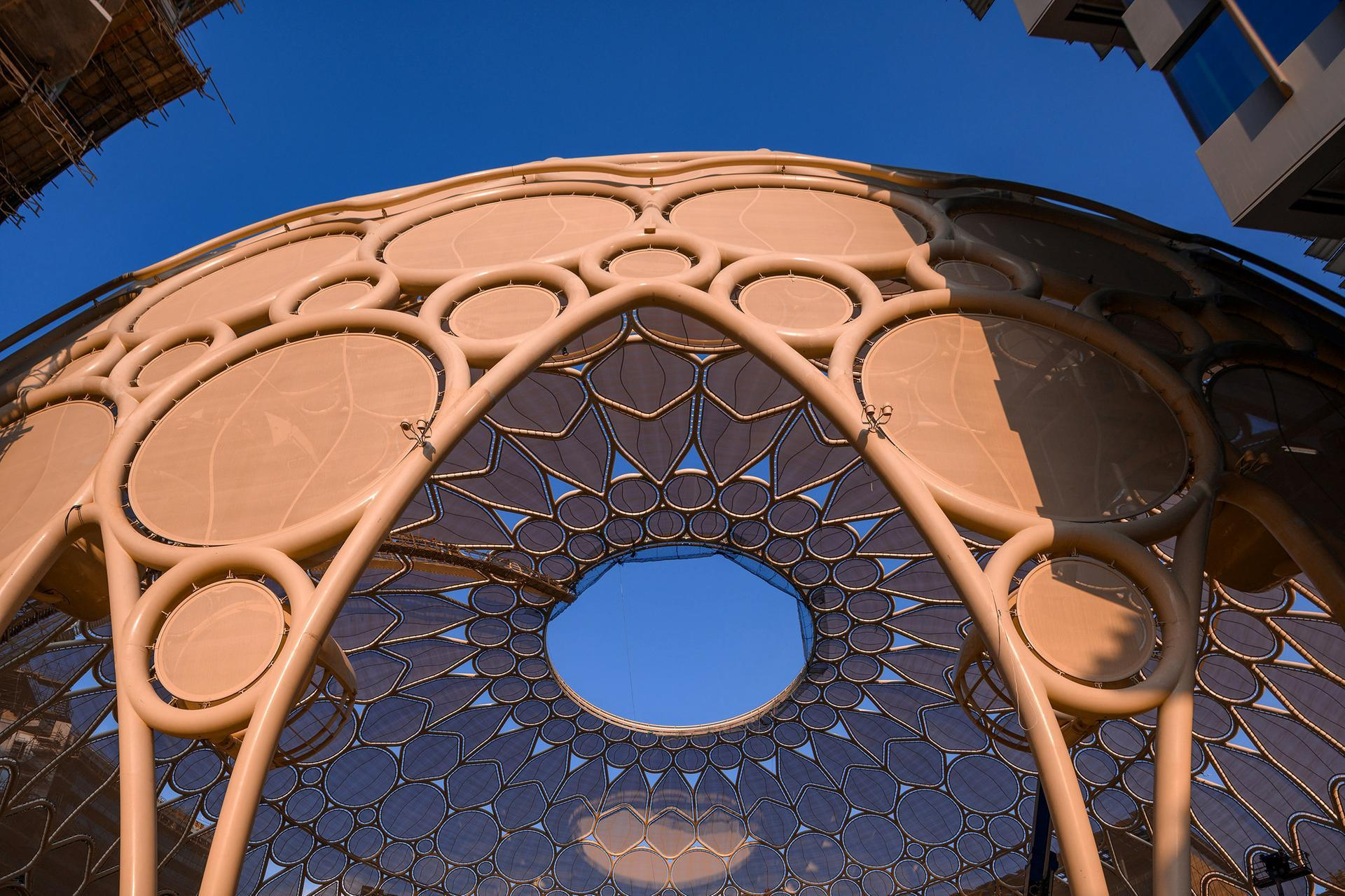
Al Wasl Plaza PTFE mesh at EXPO2020 Dubai

Taiyo Middle East has delivered sports venues, shopping malls and mega cultural venues using ETFE air inflated cushions and tensile fabric structure for over 20 years.

New Khalifa Stadium in Doha Roof FIFA2022

== Notable projects ==
=== Sports facilities ===
- Karaiskákis Stadium, Athens, Greece
- Flemington Racecourse, Melbourne, Victoria, Australia
- Melbourne Sports and Aquatic Centre, Melbourne, Victoria, Australia
- Healesville Sanctuary, Victoria, Australia
- Queensland Tennis Centre, Brisbane, Queensland, Australia
- Warner Bros. Movie World, Gold Coast, Queensland, Australia
- The Gabba, Brisbane, Queensland, Australia
- Anna Mears Velodrome, Membrane Roof and Facade, Brisbane, Australia
- Optus Stadium Halo Roof, Perth, Australia
- Memorial Drive Tennis Centre, Adelaide, South Australia
- Hubert H. Humphrey Metrodome, Minneapolis, Minnesota, United States
- BC Place Stadium, Vancouver, British Columbia, Canada
- Tokyo Dome, Tokyo, Japan
- Donald N. Dedmon Center, Radford, Virginia, United States
- Red Bull Arena, Harrison, New Jersey, United States
- Cape Town Stadium, Cape Town, South Africa
- Durban Stadium, Durban, South Africa
- Nelson Mandela Bay Stadium, Port Elizabeth, South Africa
- Cowboys Stadium, Arlington, Texas, United States
- Tropicana Field, St. Petersburg, Florida, United States
- Stadio Olimpico, Rome, Italy
- Ravenna Sports Palace, Ravenna, Italy
- Georgia Dome, Atlanta, Georgia, United States
- Taoyuan City Stadium, Taoyuan, Taiwan
- Hong Kou Stadium, Shanghai, China
- Cohen Stadium, El Paso, Texas, United States
- Kuwait National Stadium, Safat, Kuwait
- The Home Depot Center, Carson, California, United States
- HSBC Arena, Buffalo, New York, United States
- Shanghai Stadium, Shanghai, China
- Baptist Sports Park, Nashville, Tennessee, United States
- Wuhan Stadium, Wuhan, China
- HSH Nordbank Arena, Hamburg, Germany
- Komatsu Dome, Komatsu, Japan
- Misawa Ice Arena, Misawa, Japan
- Paul Brown Stadium, Cincinnati, Ohio, United States
- Shanghai International Circuit, Shanghai, China
- Shin Amagi Dome, Amagi, Japan
- Arena AufSchalke, Gelsenkirchen, Germany
- Chase Field, Phoenix, Arizona, United States
- Shanghai Sports Facility, Shanghai, China
- Brown University, Providence, Rhode Island, United States
- Reliant Stadium, Houston, Texas, United States
- Incheon Munhak Stadium, Incheon, South Korea
- University of Phoenix Stadium, Glendale, Arizona, United States
- The O2 (Millennium Dome), London, England, UK
- The Yas Island Formula 1 race track (2009)
- Khalifa Stadium Renovation in Doha Qatar FIFA 2022 (2017)
- Al Wasl Dome Plaza at EXPO2020 Dubai(2020)
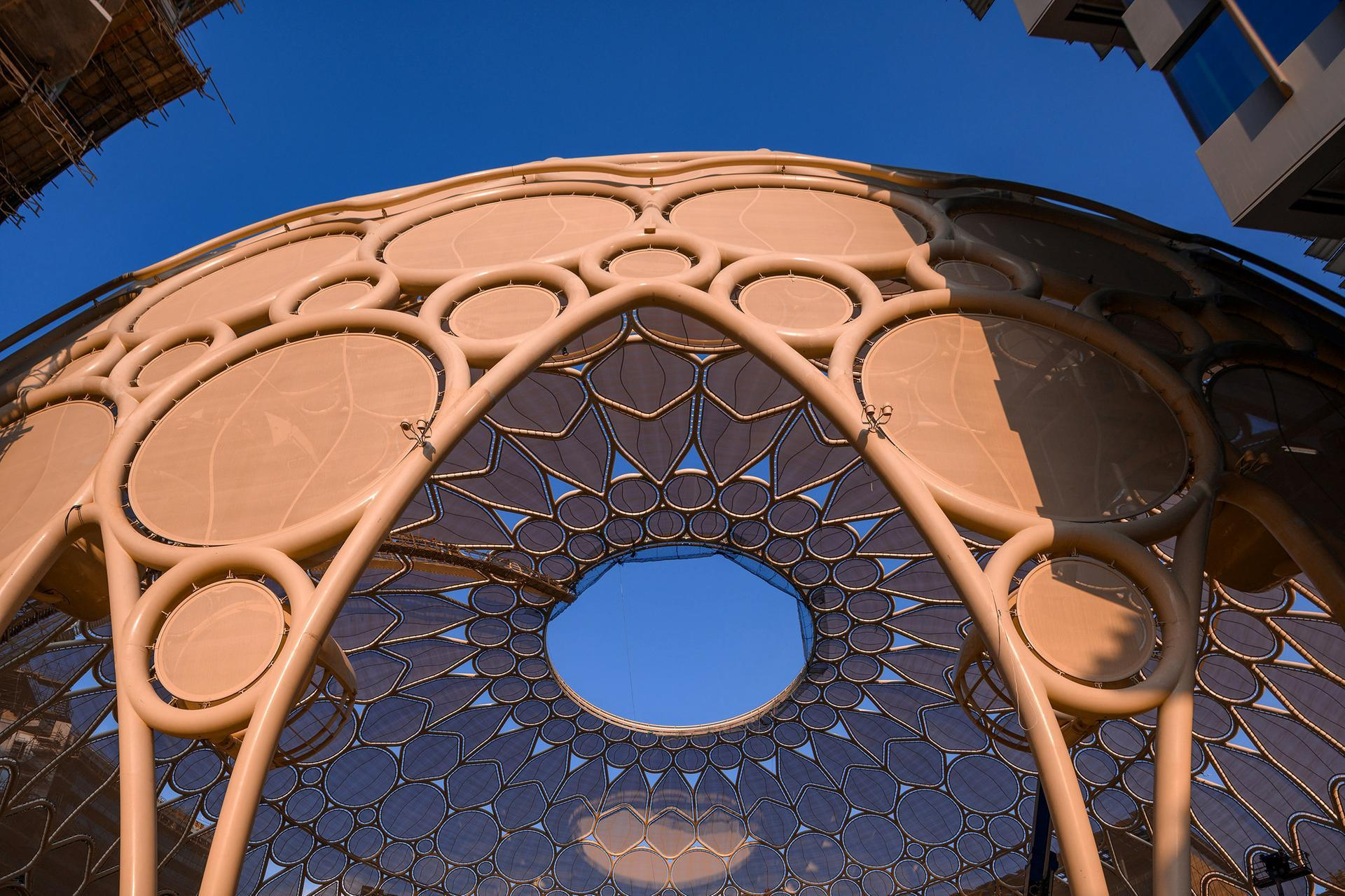
  Al Wasl Plaza PTFE mesh project at EXPO2020

=== Transportation ===
- Denver International Airport, Denver, Colorado, United States
- Amgen Helix Pedestrian Bridge, Seattle, Washington, United States
- Rapid Central Station, Grand Rapids, Michigan, United States
- Palm Springs Airport - S. Bono Terminal, Palm Springs, California, United States
- San Jose De Los Cabos International Airport, Las Cabos, Mexico

=== Commercial ===
- San Diego Convention Center, San Diego, California, United States
- Broward County Convention Center, Fort Lauderdale, Florida, United States
- The Sony Center, Berlin, Germany
- David L. Lawrence Convention Center, Pittsburgh, Pennsylvania, United States

=== Institutional ===
- University of La Verne Sports Science, La Verne, California, United States
- Strong National Museum of Play, Rochester, New York, United States
- Wildwoods Convention Center, Wildwood, New Jersey, United States
