= Tennyson railway station =

Disused railway station in Queensland, Australia

Tennyson
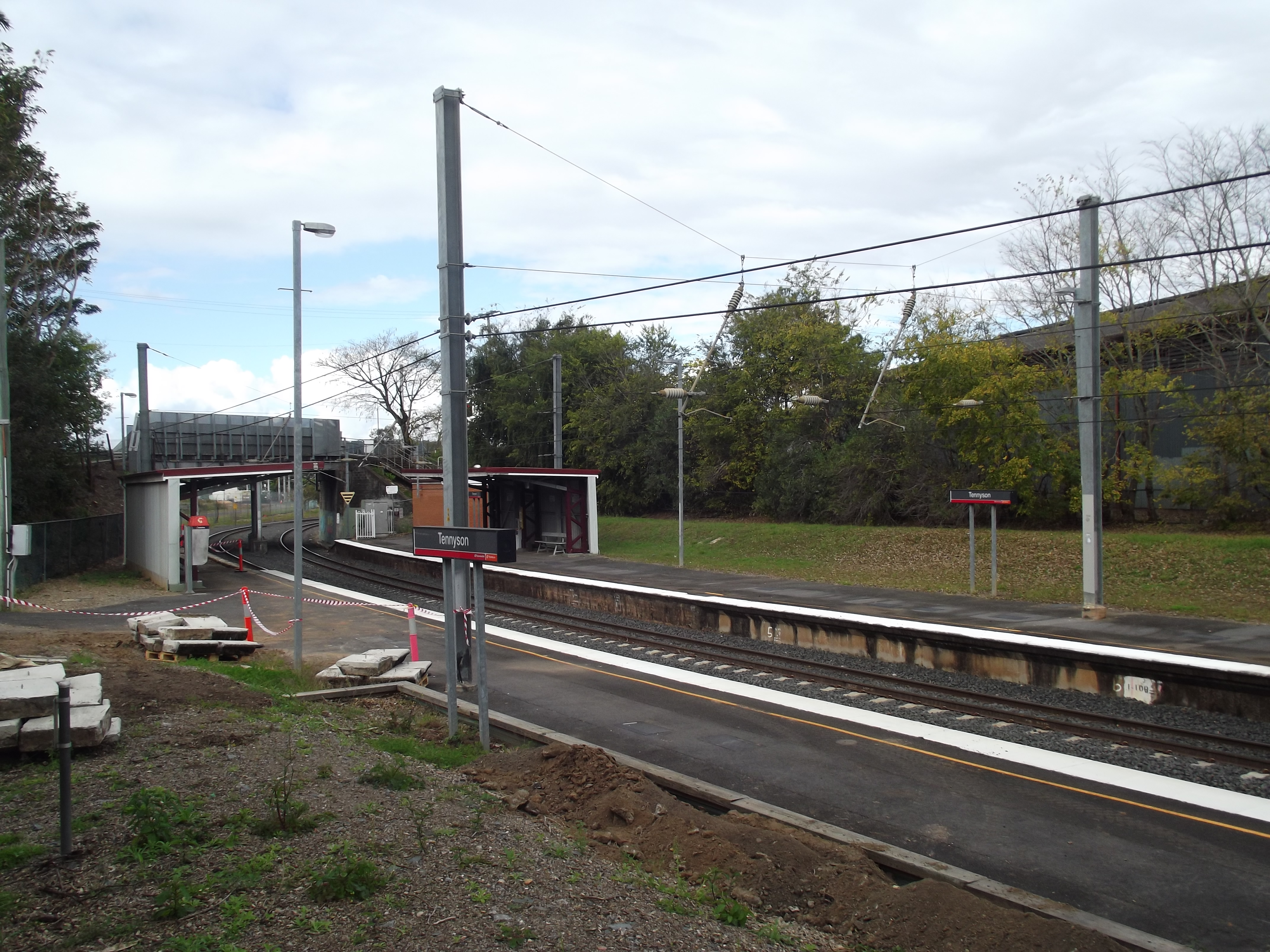

General information
- Location: 2 Myla Terrace, Tennyson
- Coordinates: 27°31′33″S 153°00′17″E
- Owner: Queensland Rail
- Line: Corinda via South Brisbane line
- Platforms: 2 total (2 side platforms) – platform 2 partially demolished

Other information
- Fare zone: Zone 3

History
- Closed: 6 June 2011; 15 years ago

Services
Preceding station	Queensland Rail	Following station
Yeerongpilly towards Bowen Hills	Corinda via South Brisbane line	Corinda Terminus
Location

Tennyson is a closed railway station that was operated by Queensland Rail on the Corinda–Yeerongpilly line. It opened in 1884 and served the Brisbane suburb of Tennyson until its closure in 2011. It is a ground level station, featuring two side platforms, although it has been partially demolished.

== History ==
Prior to the opening of the Merivale Bridge in 1978, through trains ran from South Brisbane to Darra and Ipswich via Tennyson plus a local shuttle service between Yeerongpilly and Corinda calling at Tennyson. After 1978 the line lost its importance and the majority of through trains were withdrawn. The shuttle was suspended briefly from 1 June 1998, but reinstated shortly afterwards, with the occasional morning & afternoon through service from Corinda to Bowen Hills railway station. The shuttle continued until 25 May 2001 when it was replaced by buses, after which the only services to the station ran from Corinda to Bowen Hills via South Brisbane in peak-hours. The last service was a 6-car Suburban Multiple Unit 220 Series from Bowen Hills to Corinda via South Brisbane, with the station closing afterwards.

The station remains completely fenced off to the public, and part of platform 2 has been demolished, leaving only a single usable platform. All go card readers, emergency phones, pay phones, CCTV cameras, and all shelters were removed from the station when it closed in 2011.

== Description ==
Tennyson has a short platform and could only accommodate three cars at a time. Tennyson is now served only by buses.

== See also ==
- List of South East Queensland railway stations
