= 2014 Brisbane International – Women's doubles =

Coordinates: 27°31′30″S 153°0′26″E

Women's doubles
- 2014 Brisbane International

Final
- Champions: (Russia) Alla Kudryavtseva (Australia) Anastasia Rodionova
- Runners-up: (France) Kristina Mladenovic (Kazakhstan) Galina Voskoboeva
- Score: 6–3, 6–1

Details
- Draw: 16
- Seeds: 4

Events
Singles	men	women
Doubles	men	women
- Brisbane International

Bethanie Mattek-Sands and Sania Mirza were the defending champions, but they decided not to participate.

The unseeded team of Alla Kudryavtseva and Anastasia Rodionova won the title, defeating Kristina Mladenovic and Galina Voskoboeva in the final, 6–3, 6–1.

== Seeds ==
1. (Czech Republic) Květa Peschke / (Slovenia) Katarina Srebotnik (quarterfinals)
2. (Chinese Taipei) Hsieh Su-wei / (Serbia) Jelena Janković (first round)
3. (Australia) Ashleigh Barty / (Australia) Casey Dellacqua (quarterfinals; withdrew because of a left adductor injury for Barty)
4. (Chinese Taipei) Chan Hao-ching / (United States) Liezel Huber (quarterfinals)

== Draw ==
Key

- Q = Qualifier
- WC = Wild card
- LL = Lucky loser
- Alt = Alternate
- ITF = ITF entry
- PR = Protected ranking
- SR = Special ranking
- SE = Special exempt
- JE = Junior exempt
- JR = Junior Accelerator Programme entrant
- CO = College Accelerator Programme entrant
- NG = Next Gen Accelerator Program entrant
- w/o = Walkover
- r = Retired
- d = Defaulted

First round
1	(Czech Republic) K Peschke (Slovenia) K Srebotnik	6	6
(Slovakia) D Hantuchová (Germany) S Lisicki	3	4
WC	(Italy) F Schiavone (Spain) C Suárez Navarro	2	5
(France) K Mladenovic (Kazakhstan) G Voskoboeva	6	7
4	(Chinese Taipei) H-c Chan (United States) L Huber	6	6
(Poland) K Piter (Poland) A Rosolska	4	4
(Luxembourg) M Minella (South Africa) C Scheepers	6	7^{7}
(Croatia) D Jurak (Russia) A Panova	2	6^{5}
(Russia) V Dushevina (Spain) A Parra Santonja	3	4
WC	(Australia) M Adamczak (Australia) O Rogowska	6	6
(United States) V Lepchenko (Romania) R Olaru	1	4
3	(Australia) A Barty (Australia) C Dellacqua	6	6
(Uzbekistan) A Amanmuradova (Kazakhstan) Y Shvedova	4	6^{4}
(Russia) A Kudryavtseva (Australia) A Rodionova	6	7^{7}
(Germany) A-L Grönefeld (Croatia) M Lučić-Baroni	6	6
2	(Chinese Taipei) S-w Hsieh (Serbia) J Janković	2	3

Quarterfinals
1	(Czech Republic) K Peschke (Slovenia) K Srebotnik	2	3
(France) K Mladenovic (Kazakhstan) G Voskoboeva	6	6
4	(Chinese Taipei) H-c Chan (United States) L Huber	4	4
(Luxembourg) M Minella (South Africa) C Scheepers	6	6
WC	(Australia) M Adamczak (Australia) O Rogowska	w/o
3	(Australia) A Barty (Australia) C Dellacqua
(Russia) A Kudryavtseva (Australia) A Rodionova	6	6
(Germany) A-L Grönefeld (Croatia) M Lučić-Baroni	4	1

Semifinals
(France) K Mladenovic (Kazakhstan) G Voskoboeva	6	6
(Luxembourg) M Minella (South Africa) C Scheepers	3	4
WC	(Australia) M Adamczak (Australia) O Rogowska	2	2
(Russia) A Kudryavtseva (Australia) A Rodionova	6	6

Final
(France) K Mladenovic (Kazakhstan) G Voskoboeva	3	1
(Russia) A Kudryavtseva (Australia) A Rodionova	6	6
