= 2014 Brisbane International – Women's singles =

Coordinates: 27°31′30″S 153°0′26″E

Women's singles
- 2014 Brisbane International

Final
- Champion: (United States) Serena Williams
- Runner-up: (Belarus) Victoria Azarenka
- Score: 6–4, 7–5

Details
- Draw: 28
- Seeds: 8

Events
Singles	men	women
Doubles	men	women
- Brisbane International

Defending champion Serena Williams defeated Victoria Azarenka in the final, 6–4, 7–5 to win the women's singles tennis title at the 2014 Brisbane International. Williams became the first woman to defend the title at the event, since its inception in 2009.

== Seeds ==
The top two seeds receive a bye into the second round.

1. (United States) Serena Williams (champion)
2. (Belarus) Victoria Azarenka (final)
3. (Russia) Maria Sharapova (semifinals)
4. (Serbia) Jelena Janković (semifinals)
5. (Germany) Angelique Kerber (quarterfinals)
6. (Denmark) Caroline Wozniacki (withdrew because of a right shoulder injury)
7. (Germany) Sabine Lisicki (second round, withdrew because of a gastrointestinal illness)
8. (Spain) Carla Suárez Navarro (second round)
9. (Slovakia) Dominika Cibulková (quarterfinals)

== Draw ==
=== Finals ===
Semifinals
1	(United States) Serena Williams	6	7^{9}
3	(Russia) Maria Sharapova	2	6^{7}
4	(Serbia) Jelena Janković	6	3	4
2	(Belarus) Victoria Azarenka	1	6	6

Final
1	(United States) Serena Williams	6	7
2	(Belarus) Victoria Azarenka	4	5

=== Top half ===
First round
(Germany) A Petkovic	6	7
(United States) B Mattek-Sands	4	5
(Japan) K Date-Krumm	6	7
WC	(Australia) O Rogowska	3	5
Q	(United Kingdom) H Watson	4	3
9	(Slovakia) D Cibulková	6	6
3	(Russia) M Sharapova	6	6
(France) C Garcia	3	0
Q	(Australia) A Barty	6	7
(Slovakia) D Hantuchová	3	5
Q	(Russia) A Panova	3	7	2
(Estonia) K Kanepi	6	6^{8}	6
LL	(Chinese Taipei) S-w Hsieh	2	1
8	(Spain) C Suárez Navarro	6	6

Second round
1	(United States) S Williams	6	6
(Germany) A Petkovic	4	4
(Japan) K Date-Krumm	3	6	3
9	(Slovakia) D Cibulková	6	1	6
3	(Russia) M Sharapova	w/o
Q	(Australia) A Barty
(Estonia) K Kanepi	6	6
8	(Spain) C Suárez Navarro	2	2

Quarterfinals
1	(United States) S Williams	6	6
9	(Slovakia) D Cibulková	3	3
3	(Russia) M Sharapova	4	6	6
(Estonia) K Kanepi	6	3	2

Semifinals
1	(United States) S Williams	6	7^{9}
3	(Russia) M Sharapova	2	6^{7}

=== Bottom half ===
First round
5	(Germany) A Kerber	6	6
(France) K Mladenovic	2	2
Q	(Russia) A Kudryavtseva	6^{4}	6	3
(Russia) A Pavlyuchenkova	7^{7}	4	6
(United States) V Lepchenko	3	3
(Ukraine) E Svitolina	6	6
(Italy) F Schiavone	2	6^{6}
4	(Serbia) J Janković	6	7^{8}
7	(Germany) S Lisicki	6	6
(Slovakia) M Rybáriková	3	4
(Switzerland) S Vögele	6	6
(United States) M Keys	4	3
(Kazakhstan) G Voskoboeva	6	2	3
WC	(Australia) C Dellacqua	3	6	6

Second round
5	(Germany) A Kerber	6	4
(Russia) A Pavlyuchenkova	2	3^{r}
(Ukraine) E Svitolina	1	3
4	(Serbia) J Janković	6	6
7	(Germany) S Lisicki
(Switzerland) S Vögele	w/o
WC	(Australia) C Dellacqua	3	1
2	(Belarus) V Azarenka	6	6

Quarterfinals
5	(Germany) A Kerber	7^{10}	3	1
4	(Serbia) J Janković	6^{8}	6	6
(Switzerland) S Vögele	4	7^{9}	1
2	(Belarus) V Azarenka	6	6^{7}	6

Semifinals
4	(Serbia) J Janković	6	3	4
2	(Belarus) V Azarenka	1	6	6

== Qualifying ==
=== Seeds ===
1. (Kazakhstan) Yaroslava Shvedova (second round)
2. (South Africa) Chanelle Scheepers (second round)
3. (Chinese Taipei) Hsieh Su-wei (qualifying competition, lucky loser)
4. (Netherlands) Kiki Bertens (qualifying competition)
5. (Japan) Misaki Doi (first round)
6. (Israel) Julia Glushko (second round)
7. (Brazil) Teliana Pereira (second round)
8. (Serbia) Vesna Dolonc (first round)

=== Qualifiers ===
1. (Russia) Alla Kudryavtseva
2. (United Kingdom) Heather Watson
3. (Russia) Alexandra Panova
4. (Australia) Ashleigh Barty

=== Lucky loser ===
1. (Chinese Taipei) Hsieh Su-wei

=== Qualifying draw ===
==== First qualifier ====
First round
1	(Kazakhstan) Yaroslava Shvedova	7	6
(Liechtenstein) Stephanie Vogt	5	4
(Australia) Anastasia Rodionova	6	6
(Georgia (country)) Anna Tatishvili	2	2
WC	(Russia) Arina Rodionova	7	4	4
(Russia) Alla Kudryavtseva	5	6	6
(Netherlands) Arantxa Rus	6	6
5	(Japan) Misaki Doi	3	2

Second round
1	(Kazakhstan) Yaroslava Shvedova	1	7^{7}	4
(Australia) Anastasia Rodionova	6	6^{3}	6
(Russia) Alla Kudryavtseva	7^{8}	6
(Netherlands) Arantxa Rus	6^{6}	2

Qualifying competition
(Australia) Anastasia Rodionova	4	3
(Russia) Alla Kudryavtseva	6	6

==== Second qualifier ====
First round
2	(South Africa) Chanelle Scheepers	6	7^{7}
(Ukraine) Maryna Zanevska	3	6^{2}
(Luxembourg) Mandy Minella	6^{5}	5
(United Kingdom) Heather Watson	7^{7}	7
WC	(Australia) Jarmila Gajdošová	4	6	6
(Croatia) Mirjana Lučić-Baroni	6	4	4
(United States) Madison Brengle	6^{12}	0
7	(Brazil) Teliana Pereira	7^{14}	6

Second round
2	(South Africa) Chanelle Scheepers	6	3	0
(United Kingdom) Heather Watson	2	6	6
WC	(Australia) Jarmila Gajdošová	6	6
7	(Brazil) Teliana Pereira	3	1

Qualifying competition
(United Kingdom) Heather Watson	6	6
WC	(Australia) Jarmila Gajdošová	4	4

==== Third qualifier ====
First round
3	(Chinese Taipei) Hsieh Su-wei	6	6
(Russia) Olga Puchkova	2	0
WC	(Australia) Storm Sanders	0	6	6
(Romania) Irina-Camelia Begu	6	0	3
(Poland) Katarzyna Piter	3	4
(Russia) Alexandra Panova	6	6
(France) Alizé Lim	7	6
8	(Serbia) Vesna Dolonc	5	3

Second round
3	(Chinese Taipei) Hsieh Su-wei	4	6	6
WC	(Australia) Storm Sanders	6	3	1
(Russia) Alexandra Panova	6	7^{7}
(France) Alizé Lim	3	6^{5}

Qualifying competition
3	(Chinese Taipei) Hsieh Su-wei	6	2	1
(Russia) Alexandra Panova	4	6	6

==== Fourth qualifier ====
First round
4	(Netherlands) Kiki Bertens	6	7
(Montenegro) Danka Kovinić	3	5
(Russia) Vera Dushevina	6	5	0
(United States) Victoria Duval	1	7	6
(Turkey) Çağla Büyükakçay	5	7^{7}	3
WC	(Australia) Ashleigh Barty	7	6^{4}	6
(Kazakhstan) Yulia Putintseva	6^{3}	1
6	(Israel) Julia Glushko	7^{7}	6

Second round
4	(Netherlands) Kiki Bertens	6	6
(United States) Victoria Duval	2	1
WC	(Australia) Ashleigh Barty	6	6
6	(Israel) Julia Glushko	3	2

Qualifying competition
4	(Netherlands) Kiki Bertens	6	3	5
WC	(Australia) Ashleigh Barty	2	6	7
