= 2014 Brisbane International – Men's singles =

Coordinates: 27°31′30″S 153°0′26″E

Men's singles
- 2014 Brisbane International

Final
- Champion: (Australia) Lleyton Hewitt
- Runner-up: (Switzerland) Roger Federer
- Score: 6–1, 4–6, 6–3

Details
- Draw: 28 (4 Q / 2 WC )
- Seeds: 8

Events
Singles	men	women
Doubles	men	women
- Brisbane International

Andy Murray was the two-time defending champion, but decided to participate in Doha instead.
Lleyton Hewitt won the title, defeating Roger Federer in the final in their 27th and last meeting, 6–1, 4–6, 6–3.

== Seeds ==
The top four seeds receive a bye into the second round.

1. (Switzerland) Roger Federer (final)
2. (Japan) Kei Nishikori (semifinals)
3. (France) Gilles Simon (second round)
4. (South Africa) Kevin Anderson (withdrew because of illness)
5. (Bulgaria) Grigor Dimitrov (second round)
6. (Spain) Feliciano López (second round)
7. (Russia) Dmitry Tursunov (first round)
8. (France) Jérémy Chardy (semifinals)

== Draw ==
=== Finals ===
Semifinals
1	(Switzerland) Roger Federer	6	6^{3}	6
8	(France) Jérémy Chardy	3	7^{7}	3
(Australia) Lleyton Hewitt	5	6	6
2	(Japan) Kei Nishikori	7	4	3

Final
1	(Switzerland) Roger Federer	1	6	3
(Australia) Lleyton Hewitt	6	4	6

=== Top half ===
First round
WC	(Australia) J Duckworth	2	3
(Finland) J Nieminen	6	6
(Australia) M Matosevic	5	6	7^{7}
(France) J Benneteau	7	4	6^{4}
(United States) S Querrey	7	6
7	(Russia) D Tursunov	5	4
WC	(Australia) S Groth	7^{7}	7^{7}
Q	(United States) R Harrison	6^{3}	6^{2}
(Netherlands) I Sijsling	6	4	4
(France) N Mahut	3	6	6
(France) A Mannarino	6^{4}	5
8	(France) J Chardy	7^{7}	7

Second round
1	(Switzerland) R Federer	6	6
(Finland) J Nieminen	4	2
(Australia) M Matosevic	5	7^{7}	6
(United States) S Querrey	7	6^{3}	4
LL	(France) P-H Herbert	6	6^{3}	6^{5}
WC	(Australia) S Groth	4	7^{7}	7^{7}
(France) N Mahut	5	7^{7}	3
8	(France) J Chardy	7	6^{4}	6

Quarterfinals
1	(Switzerland) R Federer	6	6
(Australia) M Matosevic	1	1
WC	(Australia) S Groth	5	4
8	(France) J Chardy	7	6

Semifinals
1	(Switzerland) R Federer	6	6^{3}	6
8	(France) J Chardy	3	7^{7}	3

=== Bottom half ===
First round
6	(Spain) F López	6	6
(Kazakhstan) M Kukushkin	4	4
(Australia) L Hewitt	6	7
Q	(Australia) T Kokkinakis	3	5
Q	(Romania) M Copil	7^{7}	6^{2}	7^{9}
Q	(Japan) Y Sugita	6^{5}	7^{7}	6^{7}
5	(Bulgaria) G Dimitrov	6	6
(Netherlands) R Haase	2	3
(Uzbekistan) D Istomin	7^{7}	6^{5}	4
(Croatia) M Čilić	6^{3}	7^{7}	6
LL	(United States) A Kuznetsov	3	4
(Australia) M Ebden	6	6

Second round
6	(Spain) F López	5	3
(Australia) L Hewitt	7	6
Q	(Romania) M Copil	7	6
3	(France) G Simon	5	3
5	(Bulgaria) G Dimitrov	5	5
(Croatia) M Čilić	7	7
(Australia) M Ebden	2	4
2	(Japan) K Nishikori	6	6

Quarterfinals
(Australia) L Hewitt	6	6
Q	(Romania) M Copil	4	2
(Croatia) M Čilić	4	7	2
2	(Japan) K Nishikori	6	5	6

Semifinals
(Australia) L Hewitt	5	6	6
2	(Japan) K Nishikori	7	4	3

== Qualifying ==
=== Seeds ===
1. (Kazakhstan) Andrey Golubev (second round)
2. (United States) Bradley Klahn (second round)
3. (United States) Ryan Harrison (qualified)
4. (France) Stéphane Robert (first round)
5. (United States) Rhyne Williams (second round)
6. (Lithuania) Ričardas Berankis (second round)
7. (United States) Wayne Odesnik (first round)
8. (United States) Alex Kuznetsov (qualifying competition, Lucky loser)

=== Qualifiers ===
1. (Australia) Thanasi Kokkinakis
2. (Japan) Yūichi Sugita
3. (United States) Ryan Harrison
4. (Romania) Marius Copil

=== Lucky loser ===
1. (United States) Alex Kuznetsov
2. (France) Pierre-Hugues Herbert

=== Qualifying draw ===
==== First qualifier ====
First round
1	(Kazakhstan) Andrey Golubev	6	6^{3}	6
(Australia) Andrew Whittington	2	7^{7}	2
WC	(Australia) Thanasi Kokkinakis	6	6
WC	(Australia) Omar Jasika	2	0
WC	(Australia) Bradley Mousley	2	5
(China) Wu Di	6	7
(Australia) John-Patrick Smith	4	4
5	(United States) Rhyne Williams	6	6

Second round
1	(Kazakhstan) Andrey Golubev	4	5
WC	(Australia) Thanasi Kokkinakis	6	7
(China) Wu Di	6	6
5	(United States) Rhyne Williams	4	1

Qualifying competition
WC	(Australia) Thanasi Kokkinakis	6	6
(China) Wu Di	1	4

==== Second qualifier ====
First round
2	(United States) Bradley Klahn	7^{7}	6
(Australia) Matthew Barton	6^{3}	3
(Australia) Alex Bolt	4	4
(Japan) Yūichi Sugita	6	6
(Australia) Gavin van Peperzeel	2	3
(France) Pierre-Hugues Herbert	6	6
(Australia) Benjamin Mitchell	6	6
7	(United States) Wayne Odesnik	4	4

Second round
2	(United States) Bradley Klahn	4	6	3
(Japan) Yūichi Sugita	6	1	6
(France) Pierre-Hugues Herbert	7	5	7^{7}
(Australia) Benjamin Mitchell	5	7	6^{1}

Qualifying competition
(Japan) Yūichi Sugita	7	7^{7}
(France) Pierre-Hugues Herbert	5	6^{5}

==== Third qualifier ====
First round
3	(United States) Ryan Harrison	6	6
(Australia) Matt Reid	3	4
(Germany) Mischa Zverev	3	4
(Chinese Taipei) Jimmy Wang	6	6
(Japan) Tatsuma Ito	6	6
(Australia) Jordan Thompson	2	3
(Bosnia and Herzegovina) Damir Džumhur	3	4
6	(Lithuania) Ričardas Berankis	6	6

Second round
3	(United States) Ryan Harrison	6	6
(Chinese Taipei) Jimmy Wang	4	4
(Japan) Tatsuma Ito	7^{7}	6
6	(Lithuania) Ričardas Berankis	6^{5}	1

Qualifying competition
3	(United States) Ryan Harrison	1	6	6
(Japan) Tatsuma Ito	6	3	0

==== Fourth qualifier ====
First round
4	(France) Stéphane Robert	2	2
(United Kingdom) James Ward	6	6
(Netherlands) Thiemo de Bakker	3	2
(Romania) Marius Copil	6	6
WC	(Australia) Andrew Harris	1	0^{r}
(Turkey) Marsel İlhan	6	0
(Croatia) Kristijan Mesaroš	1	1^{r}
8	(United States) Alex Kuznetsov	6	3

Second round
(United Kingdom) James Ward	6	4	3
(Romania) Marius Copil	4	6	6
(Turkey) Marsel İlhan	3	6^{4}
8	(United States) Alex Kuznetsov	6	7^{7}

Qualifying competition
(Romania) Marius Copil	6	6
8	(United States) Alex Kuznetsov	4	1
