= Tennyson Power Station =

Power station in Brisbane, Australia

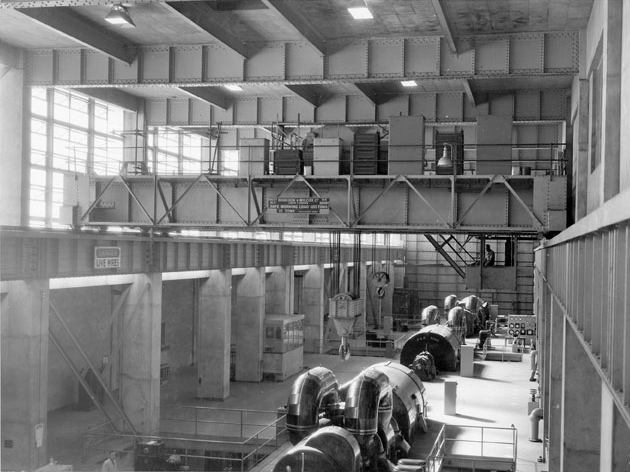
- Turbine room, 1959
- Location of Tennyson Power Station in Queensland
- Country: Australia
- Location: Tennyson, Brisbane
- Coordinates: 27°31′28.4118″S 153°0′23.0754″E
- Status: Decommissioned
- Construction began: 1949
- Commission date: 1955
- Decommission date: 1986
- Operators: Department of Electricity, Brisbane City Council

Thermal power station
- Primary fuel: Subbituminous coal

Power generation
- Units operational: 2 X 5 MW; 4 X 30 MW; 2 X 60 MW
- Make and model: GE; Parsons; Brown Boveri & Cie
- Nameplate capacity: 250 MW

External links
- Commons: Related media on Commons

The Tennyson Power Station was a coal-fired power station in Tennyson, Brisbane, Queensland, Australia, which operated between 1953 and 1986. The power station was the second major plant constructed for Brisbane, the first being the New Farm Powerhouse. It had an installed capacity of 250 MW.

Planning for a new power station started in 1946 as plants at New Farm and Bulimba had reached capacity. Before the Tennyson Power Station was completed demand for power was exceeding capacity. This led to the successful staggering of work hours and some restrictions on electricity use.

The land on which the power station was built was acquired by Brisbane City Council in 1947 as an ideal site to generate power for the city, due to its proximity to the Brisbane central business district and both rail and river access from Ipswich. Construction of the power station began in 1949.

The power plant was fueled by subbituminous coal, transported via the Brisbane River on barges from Ipswich.

After the power station was shut down, demolition was avoided for many years, partially due to the hazardous nature of the asbestos used in construction. The opening scene of the 2002 film Scooby-Doo was filmed here. In 2005, a contract was awarded to the developer Mirvac by the Government of Queensland to develop the site. The power station was demolished and both the Queensland Tennis Centre and Tennyson Reach apartment complex were built in its place.

== See also ==
- List of power stations in Queensland
