= 2014 Brisbane International – Men's doubles =

Coordinates: 27°31′30″S 153°0′26″E

Men's doubles
- 2014 Brisbane International

Final
- Champions: (Poland) Mariusz Fyrstenberg (Canada) Daniel Nestor
- Runners-up: (Colombia) Juan Sebastián Cabal (Colombia) Robert Farah
- Score: 6–7^{(4–7)}, 6–4, [10–7]

Events
Singles	men	women
Doubles	men	women
- Brisbane International

Marcelo Melo and Tommy Robredo were the defending champions, but decided not to participate this year. Mariusz Fyrstenberg and Daniel Nestor won the title, defeating Juan Sebastián Cabal and Robert Farah in the final, 6–7^{(4–7)}, 6–4, [10–7].

== Seeds ==
1. (Netherlands) Jean-Julien Rojer / (Romania) Horia Tecău (first round)
2. (Poland) Mariusz Fyrstenberg / (Canada) Daniel Nestor (champions)
3. (United Kingdom) Jamie Murray / (Australia) John Peers (semifinals)
4. (Colombia) Juan Sebastián Cabal / (Colombia) Robert Farah (final)

== Draw ==
Key

- Q = Qualifier
- WC = Wild card
- LL = Lucky loser
- Alt = Alternate
- ITF = ITF entry
- PR = Protected ranking
- SR = Special ranking
- SE = Special exempt
- JE = Junior exempt
- JR = Junior Accelerator Programme entrant
- CO = College Accelerator Programme entrant
- NG = Next Gen Accelerator Program entrant
- w/o = Walkover
- r = Retired
- d = Defaulted

=== Draw ===
First round
1	(Netherlands) J-J Rojer (Romania) H Tecău	5	6^{5}
(Switzerland) R Federer (France) N Mahut	7	7^{7}
(France) J Chardy (Bulgaria) G Dimitrov	0	6	[10]
PR	(United Kingdom) C Fleming (United Kingdom) R Hutchins	6	4	[4]
4	(Colombia) JS Cabal (Colombia) R Farah	3	7	[10]
WC	(Australia) C Guccione (Australia) L Hewitt	6	5	[7]
(Australia) M Matosevic (Russia) D Tursunov	6	3	[10]
(Japan) K Nishikori (United States) S Querrey	3	6	[8]
(Croatia) M Čilić (Czech Republic) L Dlouhý	2	4
(South Africa) K Anderson (Sweden) R Lindstedt	6	6
(United States) E Butorac (South Africa) R Klaasen	3	4
3	(United Kingdom) J Murray (Australia) J Peers	6	6
WC	(Australia) M Ebden (Australia) T Kokkinakis	6	6
(Finland) J Nieminen (France) G Simon	1	3
(Uzbekistan) D Istomin (Netherlands) I Sijsling	3	6^{4}
2	(Poland) M Fyrstenberg (Canada) D Nestor	6	7^{7}

Quarterfinals
(Switzerland) R Federer (France) N Mahut	7^{7}	6^{5}	[11]
(France) J Chardy (Bulgaria) G Dimitrov	6^{3}	7^{7}	[9]
4	(Colombia) JS Cabal (Colombia) R Farah	7	3	[10]
(Australia) M Matosevic (Russia) D Tursunov	5	6	[3]
(South Africa) K Anderson (Sweden) R Lindstedt	6	6^{2}	[12]
3	(United Kingdom) J Murray (Australia) J Peers	4	7^{7}	[14]
WC	(Australia) M Ebden (Australia) T Kokkinakis	5	6	[8]
2	(Poland) M Fyrstenberg (Canada) D Nestor	7	4	[10]

Semifinals
(Switzerland) R Federer (France) N Mahut	6^{5}	3
4	(Colombia) JS Cabal (Colombia) R Farah	7^{7}	6
3	(United Kingdom) J Murray (Australia) J Peers	5	6^{5}
2	(Poland) M Fyrstenberg (Canada) D Nestor	7	7^{7}

Final
4	(Colombia) JS Cabal (Colombia) R Farah	7^{7}	4	[7]
2	(Poland) M Fyrstenberg (Canada) D Nestor	6^{4}	6	[10]
