= 2011 Brisbane International – Men's singles =

Coordinates: 27°31′30″S 153°0′26″E

Men's singles
- 2011 Brisbane International

Final
- Champion: (Sweden) Robin Söderling
- Runner-up: (United States) Andy Roddick
- Score: 6–3, 7–5

Details
- Draw: 32 (4 Q / 3 WC )
- Seeds: 8

Events
Singles	men	women
Doubles	men	women
- Brisbane International

Andy Roddick was the defending champion, but Robin Söderling defeated him 6–3, 7–5 in the final.

== Seeds ==
1. (Sweden) Robin Söderling (champion)
2. (United States) Andy Roddick (final)
3. (Spain) Fernando Verdasco (first round)
4. (United States) Mardy Fish (second round)
5. (Cyprus) Marcos Baghdatis (quarterfinals)
6. (Spain) Feliciano López (second round)
7. (Germany) Florian Mayer (quarterfinals)
8. (Uzbekistan) Denis Istomin (second round)

== Draw ==
Key

- Q = Qualifier
- WC = Wild card
- LL = Lucky loser
- Alt = Alternate
- ITF = ITF entry
- PR = Protected ranking
- SR = Special ranking
- SE = Special exempt
- JE = Junior exempt
- JR = Junior Accelerator Programme entrant
- CO = College Accelerator Programme entrant
- NG = Next Gen Accelerator Program entrant
- w/o = Walkover
- r = Retired
- d = Defaulted

=== Finals ===
Semifinals
1	(Sweden) Robin Söderling	6	7
(Czech Republic) Radek Štěpánek	3	5
(South Africa) Kevin Anderson	2	6	2
2	(United States) Andy Roddick	6	4	6

Final
1	(Sweden) Robin Söderling	6	7
2	(United States) Andy Roddick	3	5

=== Top half ===
First round
1	(Sweden) R Söderling	6	6
Q	(United States) R Harrison	2	4
(Germany) M Berrer	1	7^{7}	6
(Israel) D Sela	6	6^{3}	2
WC	(Australia) J Millman	6	2	4
Q	(Australia) M Ebden	4	6	6
(Netherlands) T de Bakker	6^{5}	4
8	(Uzbekistan) D Istomin	7^{7}	6
4	(United States) M Fish	6	6
Q	(France) A Mannarino	1	4
(Czech Republic) R Štěpánek	5	6	6
(Germany) T Kamke	7	1	4
(France) A Clément	4	3
Q	(Lithuania) R Berankis	6	6
WC	(Australia) B Tomic	2	2
7	(Germany) F Mayer	6	6

Second round
1	(Sweden) R Söderling	6	7^{9}
(Germany) M Berrer	3	6^{7}
Q	(Australia) M Ebden	6	6
8	(Uzbekistan) D Istomin	4	4
4	(United States) M Fish	3	1
(Czech Republic) R Štěpánek	6	6
Q	(Lithuania) R Berankis	4	6	4
7	(Germany) F Mayer	6	4	6

Quarterfinals
1	(Sweden) R Söderling	6	6
Q	(Australia) M Ebden	3	2
(Czech Republic) R Štěpánek	6	6
7	(Germany) F Mayer	3	3

Semifinals
1	(Sweden) R Söderling	6	7
(Czech Republic) R Štěpánek	3	5

=== Bottom half ===
First round
6	(Spain) F López	6	7^{13}
(Germany) P Petzschner	4	6^{11}
(South Africa) K Anderson	6	6
LL	(Australia) P Luczak	4	4
(France) G Simon	2	3
(Colombia) S Giraldo	6	6
(Germany) B Becker	6	6^{2}	6
3	(Spain) F Verdasco	1	7^{7}	3
5	(Cyprus) M Baghdatis	3	7	6
(France) F Serra	6	5	4
(Germany) D Brands	2	2
(Poland) Ł Kubot	6	6
(Ukraine) A Dolgopolov	6	6
(Russia) I Andreev	4	2
WC	(Australia) M Matosevic	3	2
2	(United States) A Roddick	6	6

Second round
6	(Spain) F López	3	1
(South Africa) K Anderson	6	6
(Colombia) S Giraldo	6	6
(Germany) B Becker	3	4
5	(Cyprus) M Baghdatis	6	6
(Poland) Ł Kubot	2	2
(Ukraine) A Dolgopolov	4	1
2	(United States) A Roddick	6	6

Quarterfinals
(South Africa) K Anderson	2	6	6
(Colombia) S Giraldo	6	3	4
5	(Cyprus) M Baghdatis	2	3
2	(United States) A Roddick	6	6

Semifinals
(South Africa) K Anderson	2	6	2
2	(United States) A Roddick	6	4	6
