= Corinda–Yeerongpilly railway line =

Railway line in Brisbane, Australia

Corinda–Yeerongpilly line
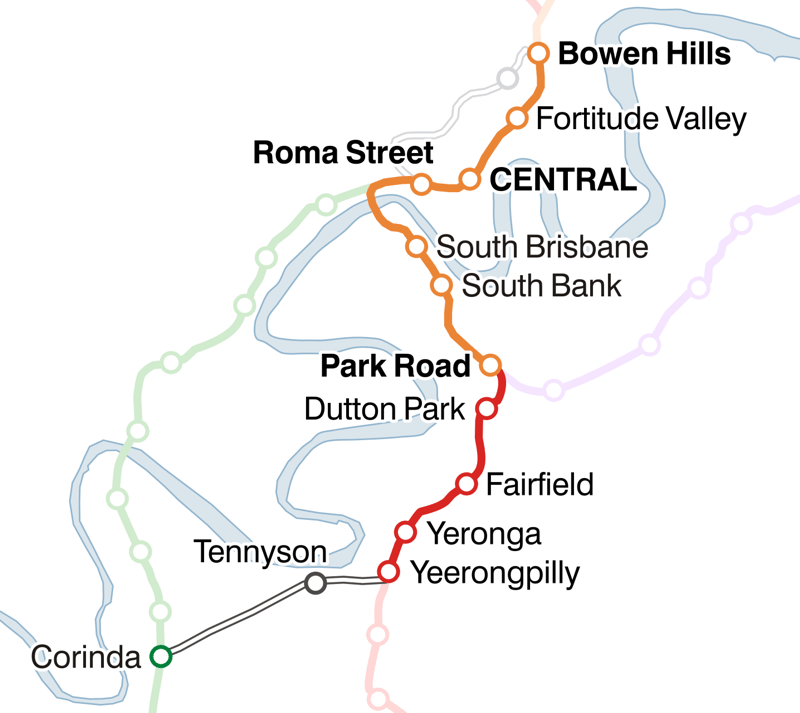

Overview
- Website: queenslandrail.com.au

Technical
- Line length: 3.8 km (2.4 mi)
- Track gauge: 1,067 mm (3 ft 6 in)
- Electrification: 25 kV 50 Hz AC overhead catenary
- Operating speed: 80 km/h (50 mph)

The Corinda–Yeerongpilly line (also known as the Tennyson line) is a railway line in Brisbane, the state capital of Queensland, Australia. It connects the Beenleigh and Ipswich lines for freight trains, but is no longer used for revenue passenger services in normal operation.

During times of disruption in the inner south of Brisbane, certain services can be maintained by running through this line. For example, if there was a disruption at South Brisbane, Gold Coast services could be maintained by travelling along the line via the Ipswich line to Corinda, then via this line to Yeerongpilly, and then south as per normal along the Beenleigh/Gold Coast line.

The line is a major freight corridor, being the main connection between western Queensland freight lines, the Port of Brisbane and the marshalling yards at Moolabin, Clapham and Acacia Ridge.

Revenue passenger services on the line ceased in June 2011. Despite this, the line has continued to be utilised for empty/non-revenue passenger services to perform turn backs and to reposition rolling stock. The line has recently seen greater use due to the construction of the Cross River Rail project, to maintain Beenleigh and Gold Coast services during various track closures beginning in 2023. Such services ran express from either Moorooka or Altandi to Roma Street via the Tennyson Line in both directions.

== History ==
The line was opened in 1884 as part of a line connecting the Ipswich line to the Brisbane River wharves at Stanley Street, South Brisbane, to provide a connection for coal mines exporting and/or refueling ships at the port. When the Beenleigh line was built south from Yeerongpilly, that became the mainline and the line to Corinda became the connecting link.

The line was duplicated in 1916, and electrified in 1982.

In 2021, State MP for Maiwar, Michael Berkman, and Councillor for Tennyson, Nicole Johnston, called for the Tennyson line to be reopened, citing less congestion and better public transport for the 2032 Brisbane Olympics as potential outcomes. This call was rebuked by State MP and Transport Minister Mark Bailey, who stated that the Cross River Rail project will address these needs, without reopening the Tennyson line.

== Line guide and services ==
Prior to the opening of the Merivale Bridge in 1978, the line was the only connection between the northern and southern portions of the Brisbane suburban network. Through trains ran from Stanley Street and later South Brisbane to Corinda, Darra and Ipswich in the morning peak and afternoon school hours with a shuttle between Yeerongpilly and Corinda at other times. After 1978 the line lost some of its importance and most through trains were withdrawn. The shuttle was withdrawn on 1 June 1998 but reinstated soon after. The shuttle continued until 25 May 2001 when it was replaced by buses, with through services from Corinda to Bowen Hills railway station in the morning and afternoon. Through services continued to operate at peak times on weekdays until they were withdrawn in June 2011.
