= 2011 Brisbane International – Women's singles =

Coordinates: 27°31′30″S 153°0′26″E

Women's singles
- 2011 Brisbane International

Final
- Champion: (Czech Republic) Petra Kvitová
- Runner-up: (Germany) Andrea Petkovic
- Score: 6–1, 6–3

Details
- Draw: 32
- Seeds: 8

Events
Singles	men	women
Doubles	men	women
- Brisbane International

Kim Clijsters was the defending champion, but decided not to compete this year.

Petra Kvitová won the title, defeating Andrea Petkovic in the final 6–1, 6–3.

== Seeds ==
1. (Australia) Samantha Stosur (second round)
2. (Israel) Shahar Pe'er (second round)
3. (Russia) Nadia Petrova (first round)
4. (France) Marion Bartoli (semifinals)
5. (Russia) Anastasia Pavlyuchenkova (semifinals)
6. (Italy) ~~Flavia Pennetta~~ (withdrew due to food poisoning)
7. (Russia) Alisa Kleybanova (first round)
8. (Romania) Alexandra Dulgheru (first round)

== Main draw ==
Key

- Q = Qualifier
- WC = Wild card
- LL = Lucky loser
- Alt = Alternate
- ITF = ITF entry
- PR = Protected ranking
- SR = Special ranking
- SE = Special exempt
- JE = Junior exempt
- JR = Junior Accelerator Programme entrant
- CO = College Accelerator Programme entrant
- NG = Next Gen Accelerator Program entrant
- w/o = Walkover
- r = Retired
- d = Defaulted

=== Finals ===
Semifinals
(Germany) Andrea Petkovic	6	6
4	(France) Marion Bartoli	4	2
(Czech Republic) Petra Kvitová	6	4	6
5	(Russia) Anastasia Pavlyuchenkova	4	6	2

Final
(Germany) Andrea Petkovic	1	3
(Czech Republic) Petra Kvitová	6	6

=== Top half ===
First round
1	(Australia) S Stosur	7	6
Q	(Czech Republic) L Hradecká	6^{1}	1
(Australia) J Groth	6	7
(Spain) A Parra Santonja	2	5
WC	(Australia) J Dokić	6	6
Q	(Russia) A Pivovarova	4	3
(Germany) A Petkovic	6	6
8	(Romania) A Dulgheru	3	0
4	(France) M Bartoli	6	6
Q	(United States) V King	1	2
(Slovenia) P Hercog	2	5
(Czech Republic) I Benešová	6	7
(Czech Republic) B Záhlavová-Strýcová	7	6
Q	(Georgia (country)) A Tatishvili	5	2
WC	(Australia) S Peers	3	6	6
7	(Russia) A Kleybanova	6	4	3

Second round
1	(Australia) S Stosur	2	4
(Australia) J Groth	6	6
WC	(Australia) J Dokić	0	1
(Germany) A Petkovic	6	6
4	(France) M Bartoli	6	3	6
(Czech Republic) I Benešová	1	6	0
(Czech Republic) B Záhlavová-Strýcová	6	6
WC	(Australia) S Peers	4	1

Quarterfinals
(Australia) J Groth	3	4
(Germany) A Petkovic	6	6
4	(France) M Bartoli	6	6
(Czech Republic) B Záhlavová-Strýcová	2	1

Semifinals
(Germany) A Petkovic	6	6
4	(France) M Bartoli	4	2

=== Bottom half ===
First round
LL	(United States) C McHale	2	6^{2}
(Italy) R Vinci	6	7
(Italy) S Errani	3	0
(Slovakia) D Cibulková	6	6
LL	(Russia) K Pervak	6	6
(Russia) A Chakvetadze	2	2
(Czech Republic) P Kvitová	7	6
3	(Russia) N Petrova	6^{3}	3
5	(Russia) A Pavlyuchenkova	6	6^{5}	6
(Russia) A Kudryavtseva	2	7	3
(Serbia) B Jovanovski	2	6	6
(Australia) A Rodionova	6	2	3
(Czech Republic) L Šafářová	6	3	6
(Uzbekistan) A Amanmuradova	3	6	2
WC	(Australia) S Ferguson	4	2
2	(Israel) S Pe'er	6	6

Second round
(Italy) R Vinci	2	5
(Slovakia) D Cibulková	6	7
LL	(Russia) K Pervak	6	4	2
(Czech Republic) P Kvitová	1	6	6
5	(Russia) A Pavlyuchenkova	6	7
(Serbia) B Jovanovski	2	5
(Czech Republic) L Šafářová	3	6	7
2	(Israel) S Pe'er	6	1	5

Quarterfinals
(Slovakia) D Cibulková	0	4
(Czech Republic) P Kvitová	6	6
5	(Russia) A Pavlyuchenkova	6	6^{4}	6
(Czech Republic) L Šafářová	2	7	3

Semifinals
(Czech Republic) P Kvitová	6	4	6
5	(Russia) A Pavlyuchenkova	4	6	2

== Qualifying ==
=== Seeds ===
1. (Belarus) Olga Govortsova (first round)
2. (Romania) Monica Niculescu (first round)
3. (United States) Vania King (qualifier)
4. (China) Zhang Shuai (first round)
5. (Romania) Sorana Cîrstea (second round)
6. (Croatia) Karolina Šprem (second round)
7. (Russia) Ksenia Pervak (qualifying competition, lucky loser)
8. (Czech Republic) Andrea Hlaváčková (second round)

=== Qualifiers ===
1. (Russia) Anastasia Pivovarova
2. (Czech Republic) Lucie Hradecká
3. (United States) Vania King
4. (Georgia (country)) Anna Tatishvili

=== Lucky losers ===
1. (United States) Christina McHale
2. (Russia) Ksenia Pervak

=== Qualifying draw ===
==== First qualifier ====
First round
1	(Belarus) Olga Govortsova	4	5
(Russia) Anastasia Pivovarova	6	7
WC	(Australia) Tammi Patterson	0	6^{2}
(Slovenia) Maša Zec Peškirič	6	7
(Russia) Alexandra Panova	7	7
(United States) Coco Vandeweghe	6^{4}	6^{5}
WC	(Australia) Jessica Moore	3	0
7	(Russia) Ksenia Pervak	6	6

Second round
(Russia) Anastasia Pivovarova	6	6
(Slovenia) Maša Zec Peškirič	4	1
(Russia) Alexandra Panova	4	7	4
7	(Russia) Ksenia Pervak	6	6^{3}	6

Qualifying competition
(Russia) Anastasia Pivovarova	6	6^{3}	7
7	(Russia) Ksenia Pervak	3	7	6^{3}

==== Second qualifier ====
First round
2	(Romania) Monica Niculescu	2	2
(United States) Christina McHale	6	6
(Ukraine) Mariya Koryttseva	6	2	3
(Canada) Rebecca Marino	4	6	6
(Czech Republic) Lucie Hradecká	6	6
(Croatia) Petra Martić	4	4
(South Africa) Chanelle Scheepers	3	6	4
5	(Romania) Sorana Cîrstea	6	4	6

Second round
(United States) Christina McHale	0	6	6
(Canada) Rebecca Marino	6	2	2
(Czech Republic) Lucie Hradecká	6	4	6
5	(Romania) Sorana Cîrstea	0	6	4

Qualifying competition
(United States) Christina McHale	3	1
(Czech Republic) Lucie Hradecká	6	6

==== Third qualifier ====
First round
3	(United States) Vania King	6	6
(Kazakhstan) Sesil Karatantcheva	3	3
(Colombia) Mariana Duque Mariño	6^{1}	4
(France) Virginie Razzano	7	6
(United States) Alison Riske	6	6
(Ukraine) Olga Savchuk	4	3
(Belarus) Anastasiya Yakimova	3	1
8	(Czech Republic) Andrea Hlaváčková	6	6

Second round
3	(United States) Vania King	4	6	6
(France) Virginie Razzano	6	4	4
(United States) Alison Riske	6	6
8	(Czech Republic) Andrea Hlaváčková	0	3

Qualifying competition
3	(United States) Vania King	6	7
(United States) Alison Riske	3	6^{3}

==== Fourth qualifier ====
First round
4	(China) Zhang Shuai	0	6	1
WC	(Australia) Olivia Rogowska	6	4	6
WC	(Australia) Isabella Holland	2	2
(Netherlands) Arantxa Rus	6	6
(Belarus) Darya Kustova	6^{4}	6^{1}
(Georgia (country)) Anna Tatishvili	7	7
(Japan) Misaki Doi	4	7	5
6	(Croatia) Karolina Šprem	6	5	7

Second round
WC	(Australia) Olivia Rogowska	1	7	2
(Netherlands) Arantxa Rus	6	6^{5}	6
(Georgia (country)) Anna Tatishvili	2	7	6
6	(Croatia) Karolina Šprem	6	5	3

Qualifying competition
(Netherlands) Arantxa Rus	2	4
(Georgia (country)) Anna Tatishvili	6	6
