= Komatsu Dome =

Indoor sporting arena in Komatsu, Ishikawa, Japan

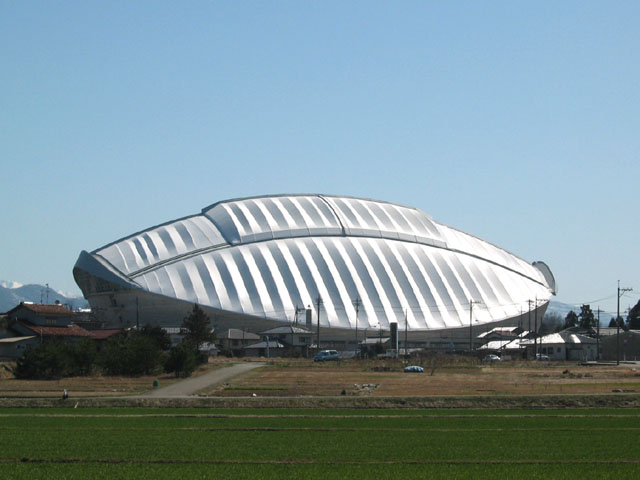
- Interactive map of Komatsu Dome
- Location: Komatsu, Japan
- Coordinates: 36°20′18″N 136°26′3″E
- Owner: City of Komatsu
- Capacity: 1,500
- Surface: Natural grass
- Field size: 105 m × 68 m

Construction
- Opened: 1997

Komatsu Dome (こまつドーム, Komatsu Dōmu) is an indoor sporting arena located in Komatsu, Ishikawa, Japan. The arena was opened in 1997 and has a capacity of 1,500 people.
