= 2011 Brisbane International – Men's doubles =

Coordinates: 27°31′30″S 153°0′26″E

Men's doubles
- 2011 Brisbane International

Final
- Champions: (Czech Republic) Lukáš Dlouhý (Australia) Paul Hanley
- Runners-up: (Sweden) Robert Lindstedt (Romania) Horia Tecău
- Score: 6–4, ret.

Events
Singles	men	women
Doubles	men	women
- Brisbane International

Jérémy Chardy and Marc Gicquel were the defending champions, having beaten Lukáš Dlouhý and Leander Paes in the 2010 final but decided not to participate this year.
Dlouhý and Paul Hanley won this tournament. Their opponents (Robert Lindstedt and Horia Tecău) retired, when the result was 6–4, due to Lindstedt's injury.

== Seeds ==
1. (Belarus) Max Mirnyi / (Canada) Daniel Nestor (semifinals)
2. (Poland) Łukasz Kubot / (Austria) Oliver Marach (first round)
3. (Czech Republic) Lukáš Dlouhý / (Australia) Paul Hanley (champions)
4. (Sweden) Robert Lindstedt / (Romania) Horia Tecău (final, retired due to Lindstedt's right calf muscle injury)

== Draw ==
Key

- Q = Qualifier
- WC = Wild card
- LL = Lucky loser
- Alt = Alternate
- ITF = ITF entry
- PR = Protected ranking
- SR = Special ranking
- SE = Special exempt
- JE = Junior exempt
- JR = Junior Accelerator Programme entrant
- CO = College Accelerator Programme entrant
- NG = Next Gen Accelerator Program entrant
- w/o = Walkover
- r = Retired
- d = Defaulted

=== Draw ===
First round
1	(Belarus) M Mirnyi (Canada) D Nestor	3	6	[10]
(Netherlands) T de Bakker (Russia) D Tursunov	6	3	[5]
(Australia) R Junaid (Germany) T Kamke	4	6	[12]
(Germany) B Becker (Germany) M Kohlmann	6	1	[14]
3	(Czech Republic) L Dlouhý (Australia) P Hanley	7^{7}	6
(Israel) J Erlich (Israel) A Ram	6^{1}	2
ALT	(Ukraine) A Dolgopolov (Uzbekistan) D Istomin	4	4
(France) A Clément (Slovakia) M Mertiňák	6	6
WC	(Australia) M Ebden (Australia) P Luczak	6	6
(France) F Serra (France) G Simon	3	2
(United States) E Butorac (Curaçao) J-J Rojer	7^{7}	6^{8}	[2]
4	(Sweden) R Lindstedt (Romania) H Tecău	6^{2}	7^{10}	[10]
(Germany) P Petzschner (Austria) A Peya	7	3	[11]
(United States) M Fish (United States) A Roddick	5	6	[9]
WC	(Australia) C Ball (Australia) C Guccione	7	4	[10]
2	(Poland) Ł Kubot (Austria) O Marach	5	6	[8]

Quarterfinals
1	(Belarus) M Mirnyi (Canada) D Nestor	6	6
(Germany) B Becker (Germany) M Kohlmann	1	2
3	(Czech Republic) L Dlouhý (Australia) P Hanley	6	7^{7}
(France) A Clément (Slovakia) M Mertiňák	4	6^{3}
WC	(Australia) M Ebden (Australia) P Luczak	3	7^{7}	[11]
4	(Sweden) R Lindstedt (Romania) H Tecău	6	6^{2}	[13]
(Germany) P Petzschner (Austria) A Peya	6	6
WC	(Australia) C Ball (Australia) C Guccione	2	2

Semifinals
1	(Belarus) M Mirnyi (Canada) D Nestor	4	2
3	(Czech Republic) L Dlouhý (Australia) P Hanley	6	6
4	(Sweden) R Lindstedt (Romania) H Tecău	4	6	[10]
(Germany) P Petzschner (Austria) A Peya	6	3	[4]

Final
3	(Czech Republic) L Dlouhý (Australia) P Hanley	6
4	(Sweden) R Lindstedt (Romania) H Tecău	4	r
