= 2011 Brisbane International – Women's doubles =

Coordinates: 27°31′30″S 153°0′26″E

Women's doubles
- 2011 Brisbane International

Final
- Champions: (Russia) Alisa Kleybanova (Russia) Anastasia Pavlyuchenkova
- Runners-up: (Poland) Klaudia Jans (Poland) Alicja Rosolska
- Score: 6–3, 7–5

Events
Singles	men	women
Doubles	men	women
- Brisbane International

Andrea Hlaváčková and Lucie Hradecká were the defending champions, having defeated Melinda Czink and Arantxa Parra Santonja in the 2010 final, but they lost to the number 1 seeds, Cara Black and Anastasia Rodionova, in the quarterfinals.
Alisa Kleybanova and Anastasia Pavlyuchenkova won this year's edition. They defeated Klaudia Jans and Alicja Rosolska in the final.

== Seeds ==
1. (Zimbabwe) Cara Black / (Australia) Anastasia Rodionova (semifinals)
2. (Romania) Monica Niculescu / (China) Yan Zi (semifinals)
3. (Belarus) Olga Govortsova / (Russia) Alla Kudryavtseva (first round)
4. (Italy) Sara Errani / (Italy) Roberta Vinci (quarterfinals)

== Draw ==
Key

- Q = Qualifier
- WC = Wild card
- LL = Lucky loser
- Alt = Alternate
- ITF = ITF entry
- PR = Protected ranking
- SR = Special ranking
- SE = Special exempt
- JE = Junior exempt
- JR = Junior Accelerator Programme entrant
- CO = College Accelerator Programme entrant
- NG = Next Gen Accelerator Program entrant
- w/o = Walkover
- r = Retired
- d = Defaulted

=== Draw ===
First round
1	(Zimbabwe) C Black (Australia) A Rodionova	7	5	[16]
(Uzbekistan) A Amanmuradova (Belarus) D Kustova	5	7	[14]
(Slovenia) P Hercog (Croatia) P Martić	5	2
(Czech Republic) A Hlaváčková (Czech Republic) L Hradecká	7	6
4	(Italy) S Errani (Italy) R Vinci	6	6
(United States) V King (Russia) A Panova	2	1
(United States) R Kops-Jones (United States) A Spears	5	4
(Russia) A Kleybanova (Russia) A Pavlyuchenkova	7	6
WC	(Australia) S Ferguson (Australia) S Peers	6^{4}	5
(Romania) A Dulgheru (Ukraine) O Savchuk	7	7
(Poland) K Jans (Poland) A Rosolska	6^{5}	7	[10]
3	(Belarus) O Govortsova (Russia) A Kudryavtseva	7	6^{4}	[5]
(Russia) M Kondratieva (Belarus) T Poutchek	5	4
WC	(Australia) J Groth (Australia) J Hopper	7	6
(Spain) A Parra Santonja (Israel) S Pe'er	2	7	[9]
2	(Romania) M Niculescu (China) Z Yan	6	5	[11]

Quarterfinals
1	(Zimbabwe) C Black (Australia) A Rodionova	6	3	[10]
(Czech Republic) A Hlaváčková (Czech Republic) L Hradecká	4	6	[2]
4	(Italy) S Errani (Italy) R Vinci	4	6	[3]
(Russia) A Kleybanova (Russia) A Pavlyuchenkova	6	1	[10]
(Romania) A Dulgheru (Ukraine) O Savchuk	1	4
(Poland) K Jans (Poland) A Rosolska	6	6
WC	(Australia) J Groth (Australia) J Hopper	3	4
2	(Romania) M Niculescu (China) Z Yan	6	6

Semifinals
1	(Zimbabwe) C Black (Australia) A Rodionova	3	5
(Russia) A Kleybanova (Russia) A Pavlyuchenkova	6	7
(Poland) K Jans (Poland) A Rosolska	5	7	[10]
2	(Romania) M Niculescu (China) Z Yan	7	6^{4}	[8]

Final
(Russia) A Kleybanova (Russia) A Pavlyuchenkova	6	7
(Poland) K Jans (Poland) A Rosolska	3	5
