= Tennyson, Queensland =

Tennyson
- Suburb
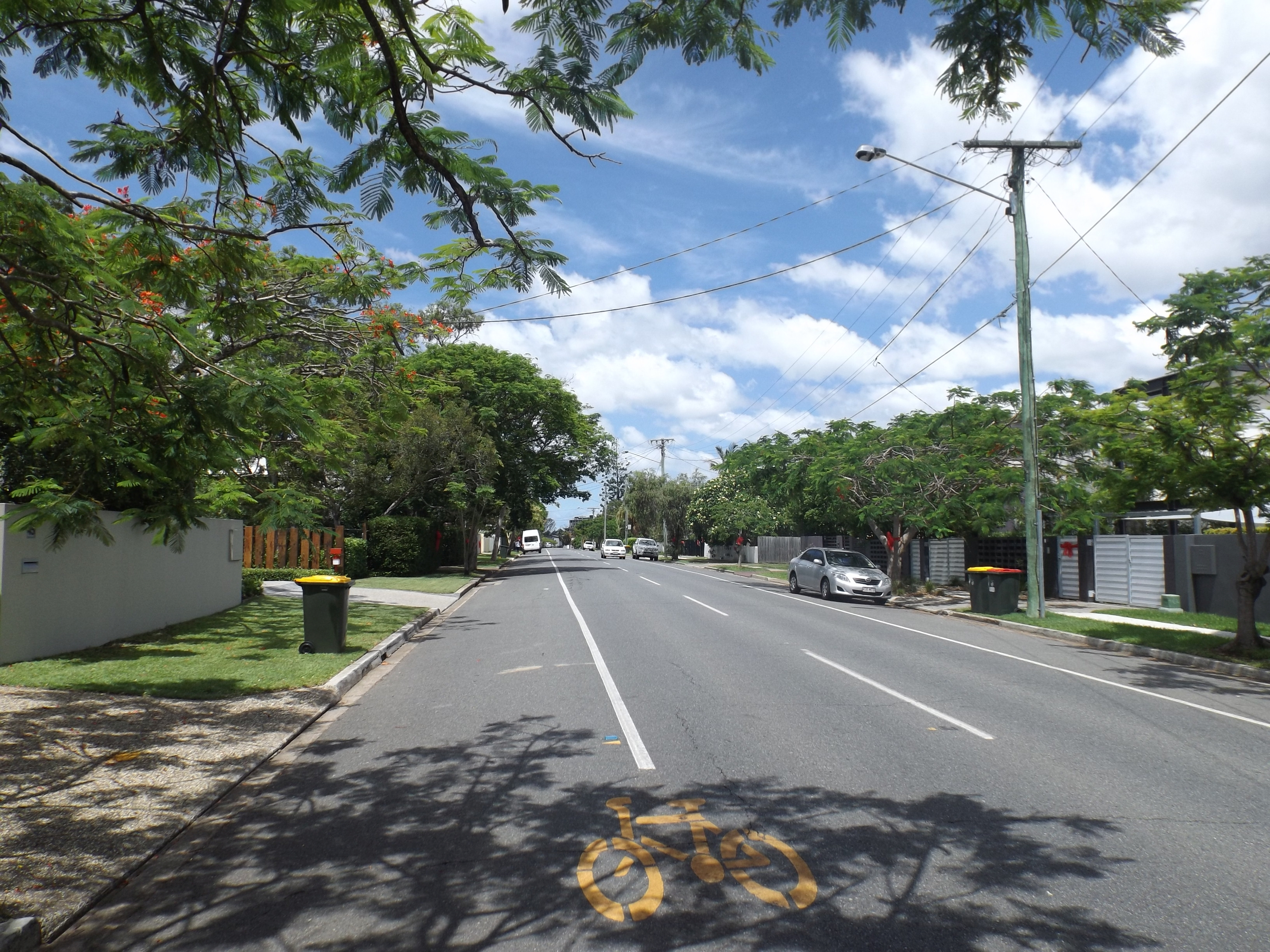
- King Arthur Terrace, 2014

- Interactive map of Tennyson
- Coordinates: 27.5275°S 153.0022°E
- Country: Australia
- State: Queensland
- City: Brisbane
- LGA: City of Brisbane (Tennyson Ward)
- Location: 9.4 km (5.8 mi) SW of Brisbane GPO

Government
  - State electorate: Miller
  - Federal division: Moreton

Area
  - Total: 1.3 km^{2} (0.50 sq mi)
- Elevation: 14 m (46 ft)

Population
  - Total: 1,109 (2021 census)
  - Density: 850/km^{2} (2,210/sq mi)
- Time zone: UTC+10:00 (AEST)
- Postcode: 4105
Suburbs around Tennyson
Indooroopilly	Indooroopilly	Indooroopilly
Graceville	Tennyson	Yeerongpilly
Sherwood	Rocklea	Yeerongpilly

Tennyson is a southern riverside suburb in the City of Brisbane, Queensland, Australia. In the 2021 census, Tennyson had a population of 1,109 people.

== Geography ==
Tennyson is 9.4 kilometres (5.8 mi) by road south-west of the Brisbane GPO. It is on the southern bank of the Brisbane River.

The Corinda–Yeerongpilly railway line (also known as the Tennyson railway line) enters the suburb from the south-west (Sherwood) and exits to the east (Yeerongpilly). The suburb is served by:

- Moolabin Yard railway station, a freight yard (27.5275°S 152.9995°E)
- Tennyson railway station, an abandoned passenger stop (27.5258°S 153.0048°E)

== History ==
The area was originally named Softstone or Softstone Pocket by James Strong, one of the original settlers. In May 1887 it was announced that the Softstone Pocket railway siding on the South Coast railway line would be renamed Tennyson. Local businessman Edgar Wright Walker is said to have proposed the area be renamed Tennyson after the British poet Alfred Tennyson.

In April 1888, 255 suburban lots in the Tennyson Estate were auctioned by R.J. Cottell on behalf of the Queensland Deposit Bank.

Tennyson State School opened on 18 June 1934 at Lofter Street. It closed on 31 December 1972. Tennyson Special School opened on 30 January 1973 on the former Tennyson State School site, being renamed Tennyson Specific Purpose School in 2010.

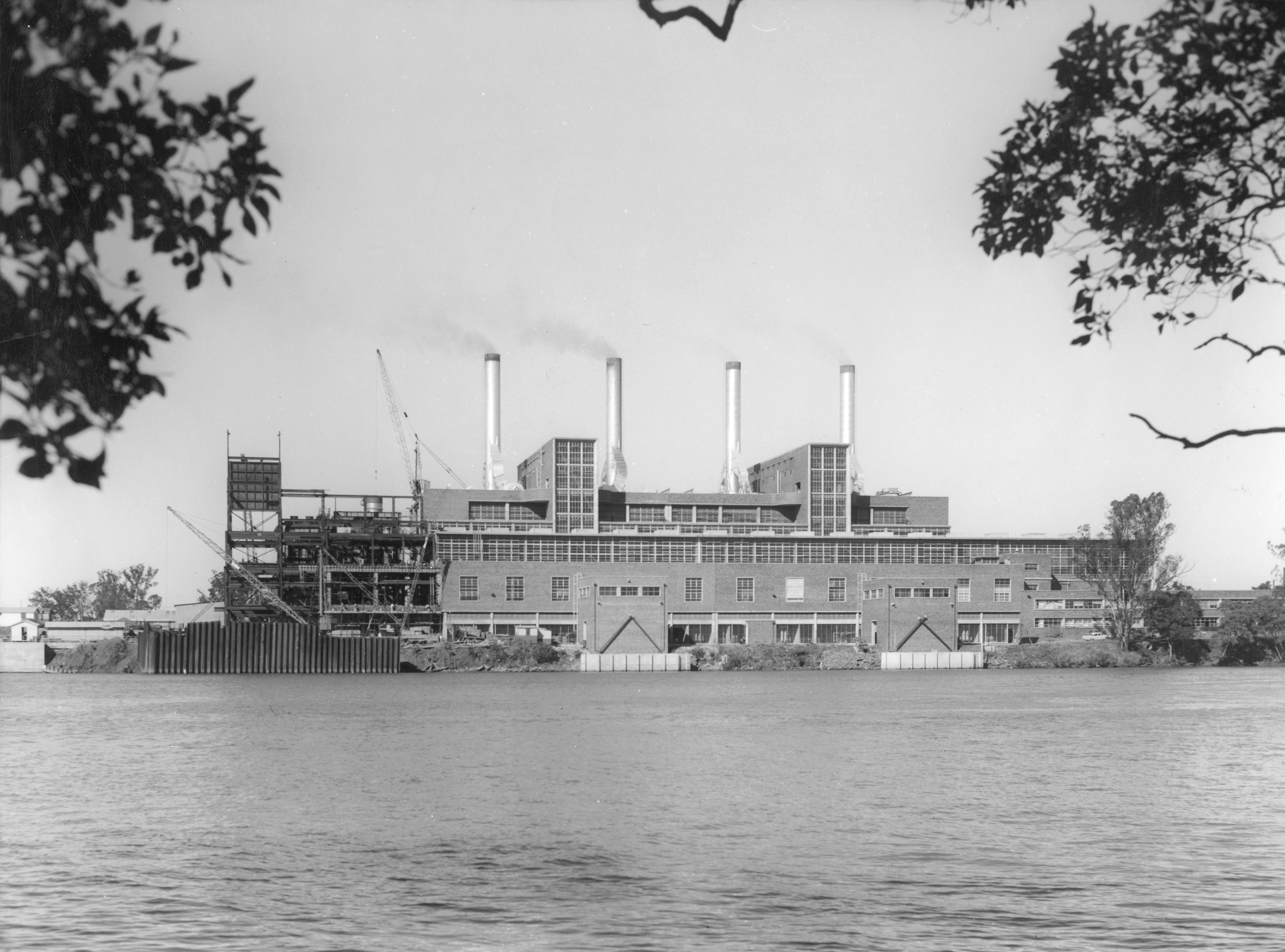
Tennyson Power House (from the Brisbane River), 1961

The Tennyson Power Station opened in 1953. It was a coal-fired power station. It closed in 1986 and subsequently demolished.

Barrett Adolescent Centre Special School opened on 29 January 1985 as a special school at The Park Centre for Mental Health at Wacol for students attending the centre as inpatients or outpatients. In 2014 it relocated to be adjacent to Yeronga State High School and then to former Tennyson State School site.

The Queensland Tennis Centre opened on 2 January 2009 on the site of the former Tennyson Power Station (27.5254°S 153.0074°E). It cost A$82 million. It hosts major tennis competitions, the largest being the Brisbane International Tennis Tournament each January.

== Demographics ==
In the 2011 census, Tennyson had a population of 859 people, 51% female and 49% male. The median age of the Tennyson population was 41 years, four years above the Australian median. 70.8% of people living in Tennyson were born in Australia, compared to the national average of 69.8%. The other top responses for country of birth were England 4.1%, New Zealand 2.4%, Philippines 1.3%, Germany 1.2%, United States of America 1%. 83.6% of people spoke only English at home; the next most popular languages were 1.2% Vietnamese, 0.9% Spanish, 0.8% Invented Languages, 0.8% Korean, 0.6% Filipino.

In the 2016 census, Tennyson had a population of 1,019 people.

In the 2021 census, Tennyson had a population of 1,109 people.

== Education ==
Barrett Adolescent Centre Special School is a specific-purpose secondary (7-12) school for boys and girls with complex mental health needs at 38 Lofter Street (27.5272°S 153.0032°E). In 2018, the school had an enrolment of 24 students with 10 teachers (7 full-time equivalent) and 8 non-teaching staff (4 full-time equivalent).

There are no general-purpose schools in Tennyson. The nearest government primary schools are Sherwood State School in neighbouring Sherwood to the south-west or Yeronga State School in Yeronga to the north-east. The nearest government secondary school is Yeronga State High School, also in Yeronga.

== Sport ==
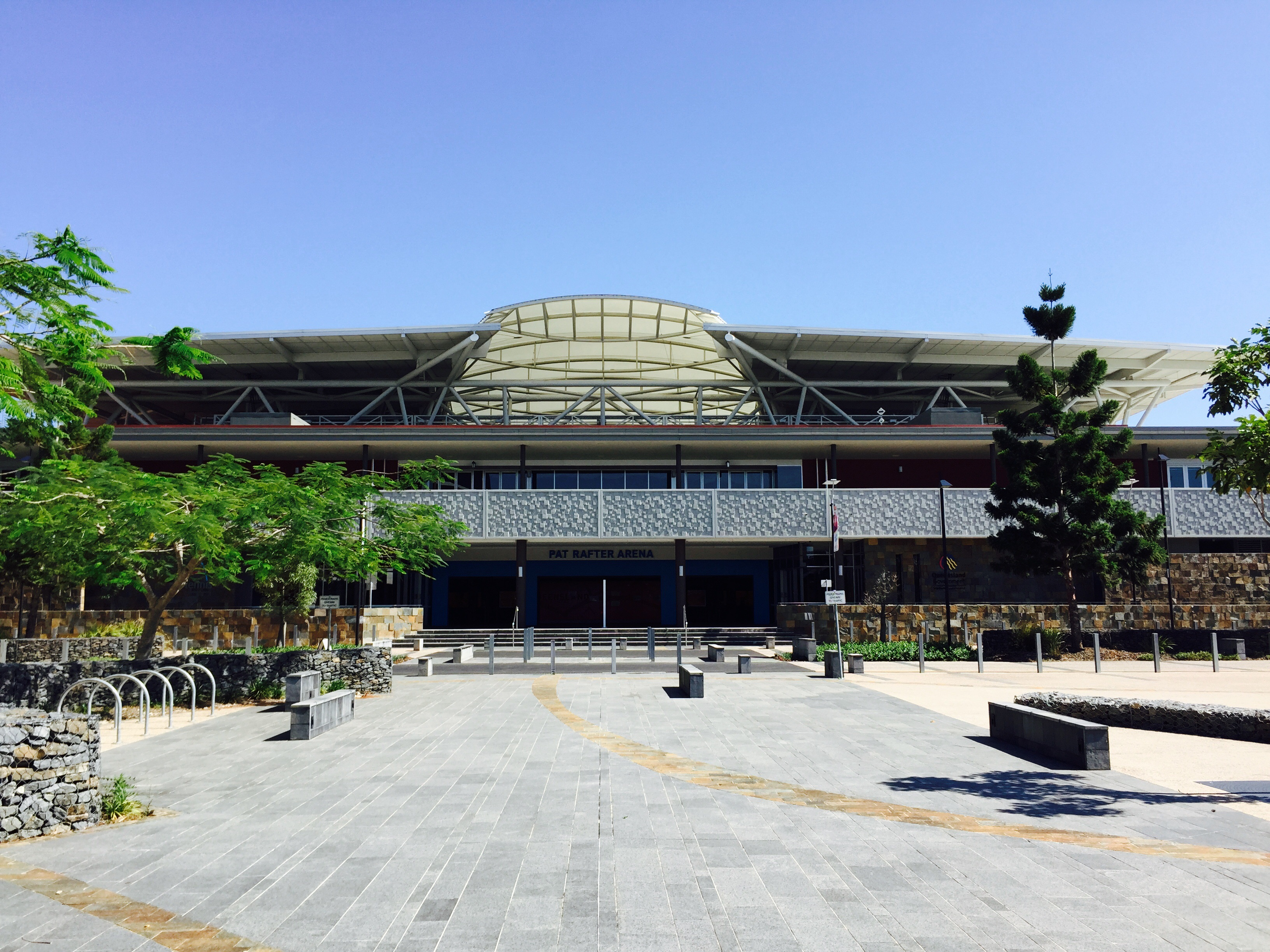
Queensland Tennis Centre

The Queensland Tennis Centre is located in Tennyson. It is built on the site of the demolished Tennyson Power Station.

St Joseph's, Gregory Terrace, an upper primary and secondary boys' school has extensive playing fields and a rowing shed on the banks of Oxley Creek which forms the western boundary of the suburb.

== Transport ==
Services to the Tennyson railway station (27.5256°S 153.0047°E) were suspended after 3 June 2011, with no plans for reinstatement.

For more than half a century bus services have run through the suburb providing access to the CBD and to the suburb of Indooroopilly.
