= Queensland Tennis Centre =

Tennis stadium in Brisbane, Australia

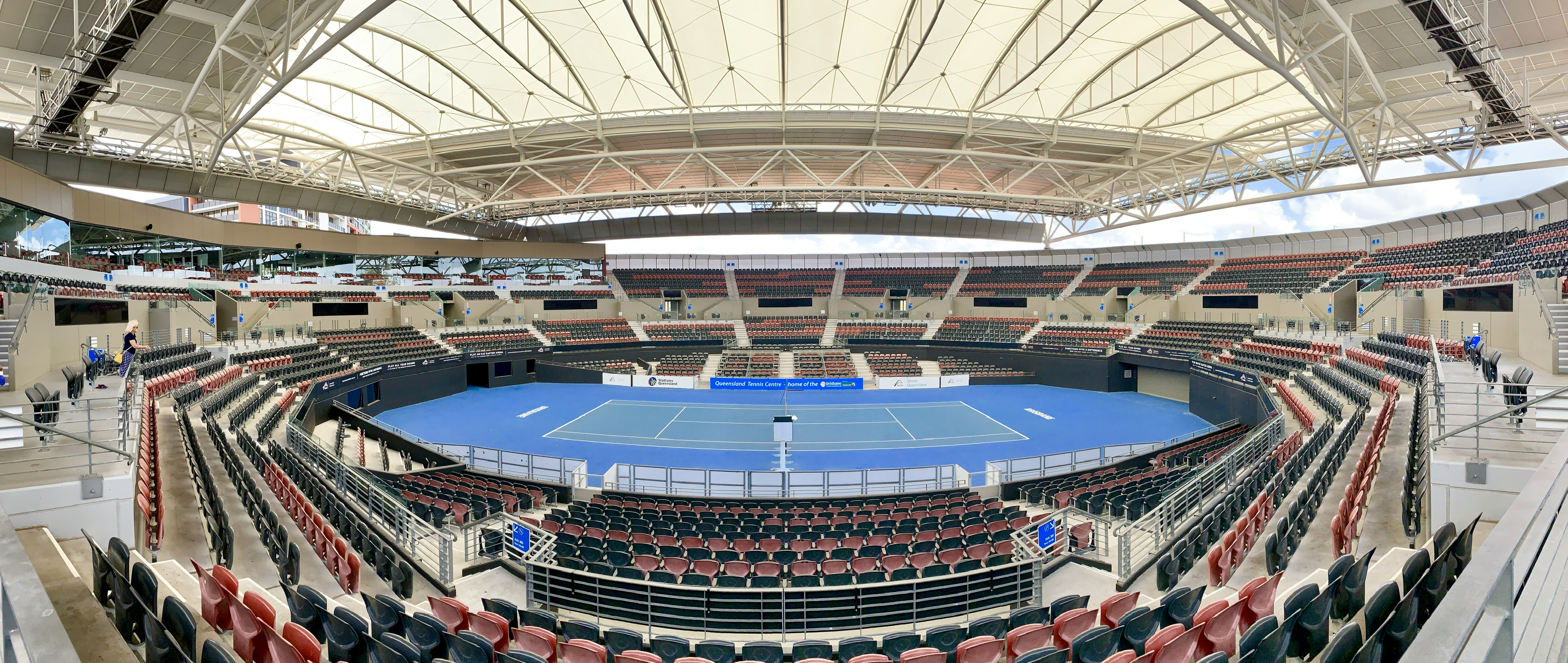
- Centre Court (Pat Rafter Arena) in March 2019
- Interactive map of Queensland Tennis Centre
- Former names: Tennyson Tennis Centre
- Location: Tennyson, Queensland, Brisbane, Australia
- Coordinates: 27°31′30″S 153°0′26″E
- Owner: Queensland Government
- Capacity: 5,500 (extra temporary 7,000)
- Surface: Hard, outdoors

Construction
- Groundbreaking: 2007
- Built: December 2008
- Opened: 2 January 2009
- Cost: A$ 82 million US$ 75 million EUR € 52.5 million
- Architect: HOK Sport Venue Event (now Populous)

Tenants
- Brisbane International (2009–present); Major sporting events hosted; 2020 ATP Cup

Queensland Tennis Centre, known during its development as the Tennyson Tennis Centre, is a tennis venue in Tennyson, Brisbane, Australia. It is an A$82 million tennis facility opened on 2 January 2009 at the site of the demolished Tennyson Power Station.

Since January 2009, the Queensland Tennis Centre has been the host centre for combined men and women's international tennis tournament entitled the Brisbane International, a combination of the former Next Generation Adelaide International event in Adelaide and the Mondial Gold Coast Women's championships.

== Construction ==
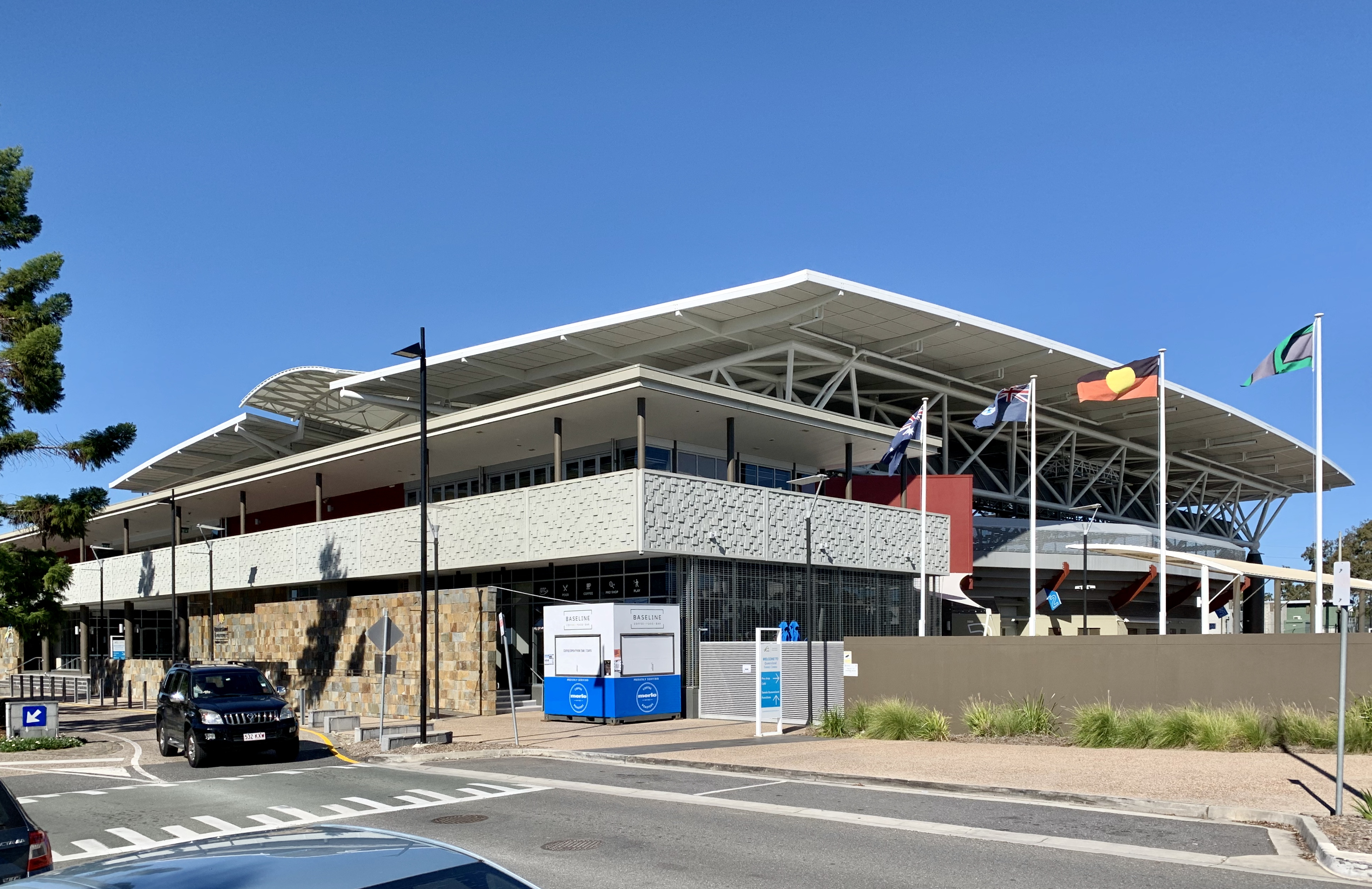
Pat Rafter Arena in July 2020

The venue was designed by the stadium designers HOK Sport Venue Event and The Mirvac Group's in-house architectural practice, HPA Pty Ltd. It was constructed by Mirvac as part of the Tennyson Riverside development.

The main court was designed to incorporate a PTFE glass fibre fabric roof. This tensile membrane structure allows diffused light through into the arena reducing the need for artificial lighting. The light weight of the fabric also reduced the amount of steel required and saved on building costs. Brisbane-based company MakMax Australia (Taiyo Membrane Corporation) supplied and installed this roof along with other smaller outdoor structures at this venue.

It has 23 International Tennis Federation standard tennis courts, including the centre court and two showcase courts, representing all playing surfaces (hardcourt, clay and grass).

The centre court, the "Pat Rafter Arena", is named in honour of the Australian tennis player Patrick Rafter. It has a seating capacity of 5,500 and can be expanded with extra temporary seating of 1,500 (bringing total capacity to 7,000).

== Davis and Fed Cup fixtures ==
The Queensland Tennis Centre has hosted several ties in the Davis Cup and Fed Cup representative tournaments.

| Tournament | Year | Winning nation | Losing nation | Tie score |
|---|---|---|---|---|
| Davis Cup | 2010 | Australia | Japan | 5–0 |
| Davis Cup | 2017 | Australia | United States | 3–2 |
| Fed Cup | 2014 | Germany | Australia | 3–1 |
| Fed Cup | 2016 | United States | Australia | 4–0 |
| Fed Cup | 2019 | Australia | Belarus | 3–2 |
| Fed Cup | 2024 | Australia | Mexico | 4–0 |

== Basketball ==
On 22 September 2026, Pat Rafter Arena hosted its first basketball fixture when the Brisbane Bullets played the New Zealand Breakers in the Bullets' season opener of the 2026–27 NBL season.

== See also ==
- List of tennis stadiums by capacity
- List of indoor arenas in Australia
