= Angelique Kerber career statistics =

Tennis player statistics

Career finals
Discipline	Type	Won	Lost	Total
Singles	Grand Slam	3	1	4
Singles	WTA Finals	–	1	1
Singles	WTA 1000	–	5	5
Singles	WTA Tour	11	10	21
Singles	Olympics	–	1	1
Singles	Total	14	18	32
Doubles	Grand Slam	–	–	–
Doubles	WTA Finals	–	–	–
Doubles	WTA 1000	–	-	–
Doubles	WTA Tour	–	2	2
Doubles	Summer Olympics	–	–	–
Doubles	Total	–	2	2

This is a list of the main career statistics of German former professional tennis player Angelique Kerber. Kerber won 14 career singles titles, including three Grand Slam singles titles at the 2016 Australian Open, 2016 US Open and 2018 Wimbledon Championships. She also won titles on each playing surface (namely, hard, clay and grass). She was also the runner-up at the 2016 Wimbledon Championships and won Silver at the 2016 Rio Olympics. Kerber became the world No. 1 for the first time in her career on 12 September 2016.

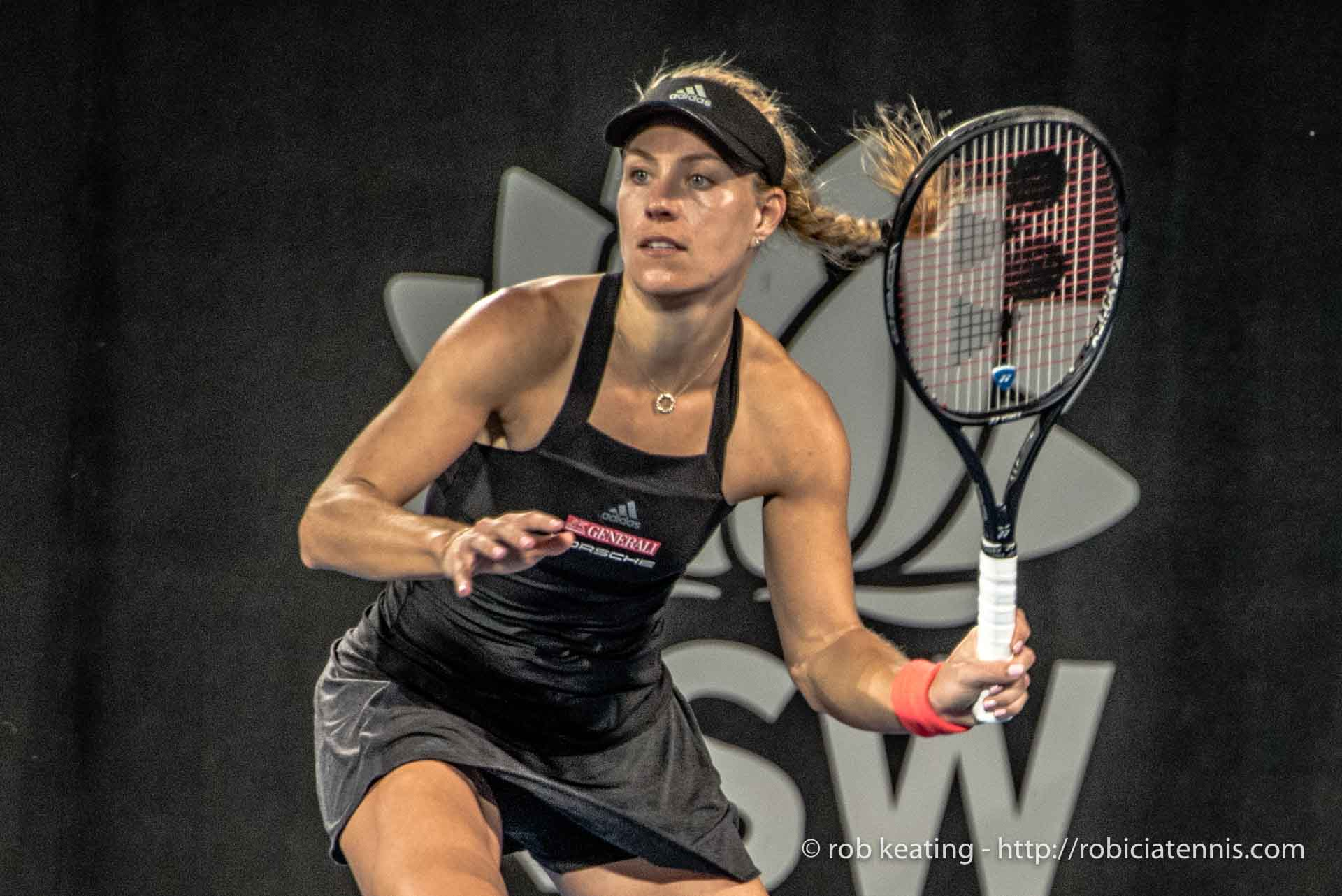
Angelique Kerber in 2019

== Career achievements ==
In 2010, Kerber made her first WTA final, at the Copa Colsanitas where she finished runner-up to Mariana Duque-Mariño. She also recorded the first top-50 finish of her career that year, at world No. 47. The following year, her breakthrough occurred at the US Open where, as the world No. 92, she soared to her first Grand Slam semifinal where she fell in three sets to the ninth seed and eventual champion Samantha Stosur. After the tournament, she rose into the world's top 40, and eventually finished the year ranked No. 32.

In February 2012, Kerber scored her maiden career title, at the Open GDF Suez before reaching her first Premier Mandatory semifinal in Indian Wells where she lost to eventual champion Victoria Azarenka. Her second career title came shortly later, in April, at the Danish Open where she beat former world No. 1, Caroline Wozniacki. She then achieved her career-best result at the French Open by making the quarterfinals, before posting a runner-up result in Eastbourne and a semifinal showing at Wimbledon where she lost to Agnieszka Radwańska. A few weeks later, Kerber progressed to the quarterfinals of the London Olympics, falling to Azarenka once more. before upsetting Serena Williams en route to her maiden Premier 5 final in Cincinnati. Kerber cracked the world's top 5 before the WTA Championships that year, and subsequently finished the year ranked world No. 5.

Between 2013 and 2014, won one title at the Linz Open in 2013, while making Premier 5 finals in Tokyo (2013) and Doha (2014), and advancing to her second quarterfinal at Wimbledon in 2014, where she lost to eventual runner-up Eugenie Bouchard. 2015 saw Kerber reverse her previous season's 0–4 record in singles finals by winning her first four finals in succession, which includes her maiden titles on clay and grass courts, at the Family Circle Cup and Aegon Classic, respectively. She also won her first title on home soil in 2015, doing so in Stuttgart where she beat Wozniacki in the final. Her other finals in 2015 came in Stanford and Hong Kong, the former being her fourth and final title win of the year.

In 2016, Kerber posted a runner-up finish in Brisbane International, and then lifting her maiden Grand Slm title at the Australian Open, where she overcame Serena Williams in the final in three sets. Kerber ascended to a new career-high ranking of world No. 2 as a result. In April, she defended a title for the first time by winning her second title of the year in Stuttgart. On grass, Kerber was a runner-up at the Wimbledon Championships. She then reached back-to-back finals at the Rio Olympics and the Cincinnati Open. At the US Open, Kerber avenged her defeat to Karolína Plíšková in Cincinnati by defeating the Czech in the final in three sets to win her second Grand Slam singles title. Kerber also became the world No. 1 for the first time in her career, after winning the US Open, and is the oldest player to ascend to the top ranking. She then finished runner-up to Dominika Cibulková at the WTA Finals and subsequently concluded the year as world No. 1.

In 2018, Kerber once again beat Serena Williams in a Grand Slam tournament final, this time at Wimbledon, a rematch of their final in 2016, to win her third Grand Slam title, leaving just the French Open as the Grand Slam tournament she has yet to win. Kerber would finish that year as world No. 2.

== Performance timelines ==
Key
W	F	SF	QF	#R	RR	Q#	P#	DNQ	A	Z#	PO	G	S	B	NMS	NTI	P	NH

(W) winner; (F) finalist; (SF) semifinalist; (QF) quarterfinalist; (#R) rounds 4, 3, 2, 1; (RR) round-robin stage; (Q#) qualification round; (P#) preliminary round; (DNQ) did not qualify; (A) absent; (Z#) Davis/Fed Cup Zonal Group (with number indication) or (PO) play-off; (G) gold, (S) silver or (B) bronze Olympic/Paralympic medal; (NMS) not a Masters tournament; (NTI) not a Tier I tournament; (P) postponed; (NH) not held; (SR) strike rate (events won / competed); (W–L) win–loss record.
To avoid confusion and double counting, these charts are updated at the conclusion of a tournament or when the player's participation has ended.

Only results in WTA Tour (incl. Grand Slams) main-draw, Olympic Games and Fed Cup/Billie Jean King Cup are included in win–loss records.

=== Singles ===
Tournament	2003	2004	2005	2006	2007	2008	2009	2010	2011	2012	2013	2014	2015	2016	2017	2018	2019	2020	2021	2022	2023	2024	SR	W–L	Win %
Grand Slam tournaments
Australian Open	A	A	A	A	Q1	2R	1R	3R	1R	3R	4R	4R	1R	W	4R	SF	4R	4R	1R	1R	A	1R	1 / 16	32–15	68%
French Open	A	A	A	A	1R	1R	Q2	2R	1R	QF	4R	4R	3R	1R	1R	QF	1R	1R	1R	3R	A	1R	0 / 16	19–16	54%
Wimbledon	A	A	A	A	1R	1R	Q2	3R	1R	SF	2R	QF	3R	F	4R	W	2R	NH	SF	3R	A	1R	1 / 15	38–14	73%
US Open	A	A	A	A	1R	Q1	2R	1R	SF	4R	4R	3R	3R	W	1R	3R	1R	4R	4R	A	A	A	1 / 14	31–13	70%
Win–loss	0–0	0–0	0–0	0–0	0–3	1–3	1–2	5–4	5–4	15–4	10–4	12–4	6–4	20–2	6–4	18–3	4–4	6–3	8–4	4–3	0–0	0–3	3 / 61	120–58	67%
Year-end championships
WTA Finals	DNQ									RR	RR	Alt	RR	F	DNQ	RR	DNQ	NH	DNQ				0 / 5	7–10	41%
National representation
Summer Olympics	NH	A	NH			A	NH			QF	NH			F-S	NH				A	NH		QF	0 / 3	11–3	79%
Billie Jean King Cup (Note: Formerly known as Fed Cup until 2020.)	A	A	A	A	PO	PO	A	A	A	1R	PO	F	SF	1R	PO	SF	A	A	RR	QR	A	A	0 / 6	14–15	48%
WTA 1000 + former Tier I tournaments
Dubai / Qatar Open (Note: The first Premier 5 event of the year has switched back and forth between the Dubai Championships and the Qatar Total Open since 2009. Dubai was classified as a Premier 5 event from 2009 to 2011 before being succeeded by Doha for the 2012–2014 period. The two tournaments have since alternated status every year. The Premier 5 tournaments were reclassified as WTA 1000 tournaments in 2021. In 2024, both tournaments were WTA 1000 events.)	NTI					1R	A	A	1R	2R	2R	F	3R	2R	SF	QF	3R	A	1R	1R	A	A	0 / 12	12–12	50%
Indian Wells Open	A	A	A	A	A	3R	Q1	A	1R	SF	SF	2R	2R	2R	4R	QF	F	NH	QF	4R	A	4R	0 / 13	26–13	67%
Miami Open	A	A	A	A	A	2R	A	Q2	2R	2R	3R	QF	3R	SF	QF	QF	3R	NH	3R	2R	A	1R	0 / 13	19–13	59%
Madrid Open	NH						A	A	A	3R	QF	1R	1R	1R	3R	A	2R	NH	2R	A	A	A	0 / 8	9–7	56%
Italian Open	A	A	A	A	A	A	A	A	1R	SF	A	2R	2R	2R	2R	QF	A	1R	3R	1R	A	4R	0 / 11	13–11	54%
Canadian Open	A	A	A	A	Q1	A	A	1R	A	3R	2R	3R	3R	SF	3R	2R	1R	NH	A	A	A	A	0 / 9	8–9	47%
Cincinnati Open	NTI						A	A	A	F	3R	3R	1R	F	2R	3R	1R	A	SF	A	A	A	0 / 9	16–9	60%
Pan Pac. / Wuhan Open (Note: In 2014, the Toray Pan Pacific Open was downgraded to a Premier event and replaced by the Wuhan Open. The Premier 5 tournaments were reclassified as WTA 1000 tournaments in 2021.)	A	A	A	A	A	A	A	1R	2R	SF	F	QF	SF	3R	1R	3R	1R	NH				A	0 / 10	14–10	58%
China Open	NTI						A	3R	Q2	QF	QF	3R	QF	3R	2R	3R	2R	NH			A	A	0 / 9	16–9	64%
German Open	Q2	Q1	Q2	A	A	1R	NTI / NH																0 / 1	0–1	0%
Southern California Open	NTI	A	A	A	2R	NTI / NH																	0 / 1	1–1	50%
Zurich Open	A	A	A	A	Q1	NTI / NH																	0 / 0	0–0	–
Win–loss	0–0	0–0	0–0	0–0	1–1	3–4	0–0	2–3	2–5	19–9	15–8	14–9	10–9	13–9	12–9	15–8	9–7	0–1	11–6	2–4	0–0	6–3	0 / 96	134–95	59%
Career statistics
	2003	2004	2005	2006	2007	2008	2009	2010	2011	2012	2013	2014	2015	2016	2017	2018	2019	2020	2021	2022	2023	2024	SR	W–L	Win%
Tournaments	0	0	0	1	10	14	6	19	20	21	22	22	25	22	22	18	20	6	16	10	0	11	Career total: 285		
Titles	0	0	0	0	0	0	0	0	0	2	1	0	4	3	0	2	0	0	1	1	0	0	Career total: 14		
Finals	0	0	0	0	0	0	0	1	0	4	3	4	5	8	1	2	2	0	1	1	0	0	Career total: 32		
Hard win–loss	0–0	0–0	0–0	1–1	2–5	5–7	2–4	9–8	16–13	35–14	34–17	34–17	29–18	45–12	21–17	28–12	19–14	7–4	15–10	2–4	0–0	4–8	7 / 178	308–185	62%
Clay win–loss	0–0	0–0	0–0	0–0	0–1	0–5	1–2	10–8	1–6	13–5	9–4	5–5	17–3	10–4	3–5	8–5	2–2	0–2	4–4	7–5	0–0	6–4	4 / 69	96–70	58%
Grass win–loss	0–0	0–0	0–0	0–0	4–3	2–3	0–0	4–3	0–1	12–3	2–2	8–2	7–1	8–2	5–2	10–2	7–3	0–0	11–2	4–2	0–0	0–3	3 / 37	84–34	71%
Carpet win–loss	0–0	0–0	0–0	0–0	0–3	0–0	discontinued																0 / 1	0–3	0%
Overall win–loss	0–0	0–0	0–0	1–1	6–12	7–15	3–6	23–19	17–20	60–22	45–23	47–24	53–22	63–18	29–24	46–19	28–19	7–6	30–16	13–11	0–0	10–15	14 / 285	488–292	63%
Win %	–	–	–	50%	33%	32%	33%	55%	46%	73%	66%	66%	71%	78%	55%	71%	60%	54%	65%	54%	–	40%	Career total: 63%		
Year-end ranking	433	375	261	214	84	108	106	47	32	5	9	10	10	1	21	2	20	25	16	103	–	–	$32,519,180		

=== Doubles ===
Tournament	2005	2006	2007	2008	2009	2010	2011	2012	2013	2014	2015	2016	2017	2018	2019	2020	2021	2022	2023	2024	SR	W–L
Grand Slam tournaments
Australian Open	A	A	A	1R	A	A	1R	1R	A	A	A	A	A	A	A	A	A	A	A	A	0 / 3	0–3
French Open	A	A	A	A	A	1R	1R	2R	1R	A	A	A	A	A	A	A	A	A	A	A	0 / 4	1–4
Wimbledon	A	A	A	A	A	1R	3R	1R	A	A	A	A	A	A	A	NH	A	A	A	A	0 / 3	2–3
US Open	A	A	1R	A	A	1R	A	3R	A	A	A	A	A	A	A	A	A	A	A	A	0 / 3	2–3
Win–loss	0–0	0–0	0–1	0–1	0–0	0–3	2–3	3–4	0–1	0–0	0–0	0–0	0–0	0–0	0–0	0–0	0–0	0–0	0–0	0–0	0 / 13	5–13
National representation
Summer Olympics	NH			A	NH			2R	NH			1R	NH				A	NH		1R	0 / 3	1–3
WTA 1000 + former Tier I tournaments
Indian Wells Open	A	A	A	A	A	A	A	A	1R	A	1R	1R	A	A	A	NH	A	A	A	A	0 / 3	0–3
Miami Open	A	A	A	A	A	A	A	A	A	A	A	A	A	A	A	NH	2R	A	A	A	0 / 1	1–0
Canadian Open	A	A	A	A	A	A	A	A	1R	A	A	1R	A	A	A	NH	A	A	A	A	0 / 2	0–2
Cincinnati Open	NTI				A	A	A	A	QF	A	A	A	A	A	1R	A	A	A	A	A	0 / 2	2–2
German Open	1R	A	A	A	NTI / NH																0 / 1	0–1
Southern California Open	A	A	1R	NTI / NH																	0 / 1	0–1
Win–loss	0–1	0–0	0–1	0–0	0–0	0–0	0–0	0–0	2–3	0–0	0–1	0–2	0–0	0–0	0–1	0–0	1–0	0–0	0–0	0–0	0 / 10	3–9
Career statistics
Titles	0	0	0	0	0	0	0	0	0	0	0	0	0	0	0	0	0	0	0	0	Career total: 0	
Finals	0	0	0	1	0	0	0	0	0	0	0	1	0	0	0	0	0	0	0	0	Career total: 2	
Year-end ranking	429	–	205	190	240	859	156	165	138	–	407	214	–	–	–	–	380	–	–	–		

== Grand Slam tournament finals ==
=== Singles: 4 (3 titles, 1 runner-up) ===
Result	Year	Championship	Surface	Opponent	Score
Win	2016	Australian Open	Hard	(United States) Serena Williams	6–4, 3–6, 6–4
Loss	2016	Wimbledon	Grass	(United States) Serena Williams	5–7, 3–6
Win	2016	US Open	Hard	(Czech Republic) Karolína Plíšková	6–3, 4–6, 6–4
Win	2018	Wimbledon	Grass	(United States) Serena Williams	6–3, 6–3

== Other significant finals ==
=== WTA Tour Championships ===
==== Singles: 1 (runner-up) ====
Result	Year	Championship	Surface	Opponent	Score
Loss	2016	WTA Finals, Singapore	Hard (i)	(Slovakia) Dominika Cibulková	3–6, 4–6

=== Olympic finals ===
==== Singles: 1 (silver medal) ====
Result	Year	Tournament	Surface	Opponent	Score
Silver	2016	Rio Olympics, Brazil	Hard	(Puerto Rico) Monica Puig	4–6, 6–4, 1–6

=== WTA 1000 finals ===
==== Singles: 5 (5 runner-ups) ====
Result	Year	Tournament	Surface	Opponent	Score
Loss	2012	Cincinnati Open, US	Hard	(China) Li Na	6–1, 3–6, 1–6
Loss	2013	Pan Pacific Open, US	Hard	(Czech Republic) Petra Kvitová	2–6, 6–0, 3–6
Loss	2014	Qatar Open	Hard	(Romania) Simona Halep	2–6, 3–6
Loss	2016	Cincinnati Open, US	Hard	(Czech Republic) Karolína Plíšková	3–6, 1–6
Loss	2019	Indian Wells Open, US	Hard	(Canada) Bianca Andreescu	4–6, 6–3, 4–6

== WTA career finals ==
=== Singles: 32 (14 titles, 18 runner-ups) ===
Legend Grand Slam (3–1) Summer Olympics (0–1) WTA Finals (0–1) Premier 5 & M / WTA 1000 (0–5) Premier / WTA 500 (7–6) International / WTA 250 (4–4)	Finals by surface Hard (7–13) Grass (3–4) Clay (4–1)

Result	W–L	Date	Tournament	Tier	Surface	Opponent	Score
Loss	0–1	Feb 2010	Copa Colsanitas, Colombia	International	Clay	(Colombia) Mariana Duque Mariño	4–6, 3–6
Win	1–1	Feb 2012	Open GDF Suez, France	Premier	Hard (i)	(France) Marion Bartoli	7–6^{(7–3)}, 5–7, 6–3
Win	2–1	Apr 2012	Danish Open, Denmark	International	Hard (i)	(Denmark) Caroline Wozniacki	6–4, 6–4
Loss	2–2	Jun 2012	Eastbourne International, United Kingdom	Premier	Grass	(Austria) Tamira Paszek	7–5, 3–6, 5–7
Loss	2–3	Aug 2012	Cincinnati Open, United States	Premier 5	Hard	(China) Li Na	6–1, 3–6, 1–6
Loss	2–4	Apr 2013	Monterrey Open, Mexico	International	Hard	(Russia) Anastasia Pavlyuchenkova	6–4, 2–6, 4–6
Loss	2–5	Sep 2013	Pan Pacific Open, Japan	Premier 5	Hard	(Czech Republic) Petra Kvitová	2–6, 6–0, 3–6
Win	3–5	Oct 2013	Linz Open, Austria	International	Hard (i)	(Serbia) Ana Ivanovic	6–4, 7–6^{(8–6)}
Loss	3–6	Jan 2014	Sydney International, Australia	Premier	Hard	(Bulgaria) Tsvetana Pironkova	4–6, 4–6
Loss	3–7	Feb 2014	Qatar Open, Qatar	Premier 5	Hard	(Romania) Simona Halep	2–6, 3–6
Loss	3–8	Jun 2014	Eastbourne International, United Kingdom	Premier	Grass	(United States) Madison Keys	3–6, 6–3, 5–7
Loss	3–9	Aug 2014	Silicon Valley Classic, United States	Premier	Hard	(United States) Serena Williams	6–7^{(1–7)}, 3–6
Win	4–9	Apr 2015	Charleston Open, United States	Premier	Clay	(United States) Madison Keys	6–2, 4–6, 7–5
Win	5–9	Apr 2015	Stuttgart Open, Germany	Premier	Clay (i)	(Denmark) Caroline Wozniacki	3–6, 6–1, 7–5
Win	6–9	Jun 2015	Birmingham Classic, United Kingdom	Premier	Grass	(Czech Republic) Karolína Plíšková	6–7^{(5–7)}, 6–3, 7–6^{(7–4)}
Win	7–9	Aug 2015	Silicon Valley Classic, United States	Premier	Hard	(Czech Republic) Karolína Plíšková	6–3, 5–7, 6–4
Loss	7–10	Oct 2015	Hong Kong Open, China	International	Hard	(Serbia) Jelena Janković	6–3, 6–7^{(4–7)}, 1–6
Loss	7–11	Jan 2016	Brisbane International, Australia	Premier	Hard	(Belarus) Victoria Azarenka	3–6, 1–6
Win	8–11	Jan 2016	Australian Open, Australia	Grand Slam	Hard	(United States) Serena Williams	6–4, 3–6, 6–4
Win	9–11	Apr 2016	Stuttgart Open, Germany (2)	Premier	Clay (i)	(Germany) Laura Siegemund	6–4, 6–0
Loss	9–12	Jul 2016	Wimbledon, United Kingdom	Grand Slam	Grass	(United States) Serena Williams	5–7, 3–6
Loss	9–13	Aug 2016	Rio Olympics, Brazil	Olympics	Hard	(Puerto Rico) Monica Puig	4–6, 6–4, 1–6
Loss	9–14	Aug 2016	Cincinnati Open, United States	Premier 5	Hard	(Czech Republic) Karolína Plíšková	3–6, 1–6
Win	10–14	Sep 2016	US Open, United States	Grand Slam	Hard	(Czech Republic) Karolína Plíšková	6–3, 4–6, 6–4
Loss	10–15	Oct 2016	WTA Finals, Singapore	WTA Finals	Hard (i)	(Slovakia) Dominika Cibulková	3–6, 4–6
Loss	10–16	Apr 2017	Monterrey Open, Mexico	International	Hard	(Russia) Anastasia Pavlyuchenkova	4–6, 6–2, 1–6
Win	11–16	Jan 2018	Sydney International, Australia	Premier	Hard	(Australia) Ashleigh Barty	6–4, 6–4
Win	12–16	Jul 2018	Wimbledon, United Kingdom	Grand Slam	Grass	(United States) Serena Williams	6–3, 6–3
Loss	12–17	Mar 2019	Indian Wells Open, United States	Premier M	Hard	(Canada) Bianca Andreescu	4–6, 6–3, 4–6
Loss	12–18	Jun 2019	Eastbourne International, United Kingdom	Premier	Grass	(Czech Republic) Karolína Plíšková	1–6, 4–6
Win	13–18	Jun 2021	Bad Homburg Open, Germany	WTA 250	Grass	(Czech Republic) Kateřina Siniaková	6–3, 6–2
Win	14–18	May 2022	Internationaux de Strasbourg, France	WTA 250	Clay	(Slovenia) Kaja Juvan	7–6^{(7–5)}, 6–7^{(0–7)}, 7–6^{(7–5)}

=== Doubles: 2 (2 runner-ups) ===
Legend Grand Slam (0–0) Premier 5 & M / WTA 1000 (0–0) Premier / WTA 500 (0–1) International / WTA 250 (0–1)	Finals by surface Hard (0–1) Grass (0–1) Clay (0–0)

Result	W–L	Date	Tournament	Tier	Surface	Partner	Opponents	Score
Loss	0–1	Jun 2008	Rosmalen Championships, Netherlands	Tier III	Grass	(Latvia) Līga Dekmeijere	(New Zealand) Marina Erakovic (Netherlands) Michaëlla Krajicek	3–6, 2–6
Loss	0–2	Jan 2016	Brisbane International, Australia	Premier	Hard	(Germany) Andrea Petkovic	(Switzerland) Martina Hingis (India) Sania Mirza	5–7, 1–6

== Team competition finals ==
Finals by tournaments
Fed Cup (0–1)
United Cup (1–0)
Hopman Cup (0–2)

Result	Date	Tournament	Surface	Partner(s)	Opponent team	Opponent players	Score
Loss	Nov 2014	Fed Cup, Czech Republic	Hard (i)	Andrea Petkovic; Sabine Lisicki; Julia Görges	Czech Republic	Petra Kvitová; Lucie Šafářová; Lucie Hradecká; Andrea Hlaváčková	1–3
Loss	Jan 2018	Hopman Cup, Australia	Hard	Alexander Zverev	Switzerland	Roger Federer; Belinda Bencic	1–2
Loss	Jan 2019	Hopman Cup, Australia	Hard	Alexander Zverev	Switzerland	Roger Federer; Belinda Bencic	1–2
Win	Jan 2024	United Cup, Australia	Hard	Alexander Zverev; Laura Siegemund	Poland	Hubert Hurkacz; Iga Świątek	2–1

== ITF Circuit finals ==
Since Kerber's professional debut in 2003, she has won eleven ITF titles in singles. She also reached five ITF doubles finals, winning three titles.

=== Singles: 18 (11 titles, 7 runner-ups) ===
Legend
$100,000 tournaments (0–1)
$75,000 tournaments (1–1)
$50,000 tournaments (3–0)
$25,000 tournaments (7–5)
$10,000 tournaments (0–0)

Result	W–L	Date	Tournament	Tier	Surface	Opponent	Score
Loss	0–1	Feb 2004	ITF Warsaw, Poland	25,000	Carpet (i)	(Poland) Marta Domachowska	6–7^{(5)}, 6–3, 3–6
Win	1–1	Nov 2004	ITF Opole, Poland	25,000	Carpet (i)	(Ukraine) Elena Tatarkova	6–2, 6–2
Loss	0–2	May 2005	ITF Monzón, Spain	25,000	Hard	(Ukraine) Olena Antypina	3–6, 3–6
Win	2–2	Feb 2006	ITF Saguenay, Canada	25,000	Hard (i)	(Canada) Valérie Tétreault	5–7, 7–5, 7–6^{(6)}
Win	3–2	Oct 2006	ITF Jersey, Great Britain	25,000	Hard (i)	(France) Irena Pavlovic	6–0, 6–4
Win	4–2	Oct 2006	ITF Glasgow, Great Britain	25,000	Hard (i)	(Belgium) Kirsten Flipkens	6–4, 6–2
Loss	4–3	Nov 2006	ITF Přerov, Czech Republic	25,000	Carpet (i)	(United Kingdom) Anne Keothavong	4–6, 5–7
Loss	4–4	Feb 2007	ITF Palm Desert, United States	25,000	Hard	(United States) Julie Ditty	1–6, 0–6
Win	5–4	Feb 2007	ITF Saguenay, Canada	50,000	Hard (i)	(Germany) Sabine Lisicki	6–3, 6–4
Win	6–4	Mar 2007	ITF Las Palmas, Spain	25,000	Hard	(Czech Republic) Petra Cetkovská	6–2, 1–6, 6–4
Loss	6–5	Mar 2007	ITF Tenerife, Spain	25,000	Hard	(Czech Republic) Petra Cetkovská	5–7, 7–5, 6–7^{(5)}
Win	7–5	May 2007	ITF Antalya, Turkey	25,000	Hard	(Switzerland) Gaëlle Widmer	3–6, 6–4, 6–1
Loss	7–6	May 2007	ITF Monzón, Spain	75,000	Hard	(United States) Lilia Osterloh	3–6, 6–7^{(4)}
Win	8–6	Jun 2007	ITF Přerov, Czech Republic	75,000	Clay	(Czech Republic) Klára Koukalová	6–3, 1–6, 7–5
Win	9–6	Sep 2008	ITF Madrid, Spain	25,000	Hard	(Spain) Estrella Cabeza Candela	6–1, 6–3
Win	10–6	Oct 2008	ITF Saint-Raphaël, France	50,000	Hard (i)	(France) Séverine Brémond	6–2, 6–1
Win	11–6	Jun 2009	ITF Pozoblanco, Spain	50,000	Hard	(Slovakia) Kristína Kučová	6–3, 6–4
Loss	11–7	Mar 2011	ITF Nassau, Bahamas	100,000	Hard	(Belarus) Anastasiya Yakimova	3–6, 2–6

=== Doubles: 5 (3 titles, 2 runner-ups) ===
Legend
$100,000 tournaments (1–0)
$75,000 tournaments (1–0)
$50,000 tournaments (1–0)
$25,000 tournaments (0–2)
$10,000 tournaments (0–0)

Result	W–L	Date	Tournament	Tier	Surface	Partner	Opponents	Score
Loss	0–1	Jul 2004	ITF Toruń, Poland	25,000	Clay	(Poland) Marta Leśniak	(Hungary) Kira Nagy (Czech Republic) Gabriela Navrátilová	4–6, 6–7^{(2)}
Loss	0–2	Aug 2005	ITF Coimbra, Portugal	25,000	Hard	(Germany) Tatjana Priachin	(Spain) María José Martínez Sánchez (Portugal) Ana Catarina Nogueira	4–6, 6–7^{(1)}
Win	1–2	Feb 2007	ITF Saguenay, Canada	50,000	Hard (i)	(Romania) Ágnes Szatmári	(Germany) Sabine Klaschka (Germany) Angelika Rösch	6–1, 6–4
Win	2–2	Apr 2007	ITF Saint-Malo, France	75,000	Clay (i)	(Austria) Yvonne Meusburger	(France) Stéphanie Foretz (France) Aurélie Védy	6–4, 6–7^{(6)}, 6–2
Win	3–2	Nov 2008	ITF Kraków, Poland	100,000	Hard	(Poland) Urszula Radwańska	(Poland) Olga Brózda (Poland) Sandra Zaniewska	6–3, 6–2

== ITF Junior Circuit finals ==
=== Singles: 4 (4 runner-ups) ===
Legend
Category GA (0–0)
Category G1 (0–1)
Category G2–G5 (0–3)

Result	W–L	Date	Tournament	Tier	Surface	Opponent	Score
Loss	0–1	Jul 2002	26th German Junior Open, Germany	G1	Clay	(Slovakia) Jarmila Gajdošová	0–6, 1–6
Loss	0–2	Oct 2002	Hong Kong Open Junior Championships, China	G2	Hard	(Czech Republic) Lucie Šafářová	4–6, 4–6
Loss	0–3	Aug 2003	BMW Junior Open, Luxembourg	G2	Clay	(Slovenia) Maša Zec Peškirič	2–6, 1–6
Loss	0–4	Jan 2004	Victorian Junior Championships, Australia	G2	Hard	(Switzerland) Timea Bacsinszky	4–6, 4–6

=== Doubles: 2 (2 titles) ===
Legend
Category GA (0–0)
Category G1 (0–0)
Category G2–G5 (2–0)

Result	W–L	Date	Tournament	Tier	Surface	Partner	Opponents	Score
Win	1–0	Mar 2003	Nuremberg Jrs., Germany	G2	Carpet (i)	(Poland) Marta Domachowska	(Germany) Maren Kassens (Germany) Carmen Klaschka	7–5, 6–3
Win	2–0	Jan 2004	Traralgon Jrs., Australia	G2	Hard	(Poland) Marta Leśniak	(Sweden) Mari Andersson (Switzerland) Timea Bacsinszky	6–2, 6–0

== WTA Tour career earnings ==
Year	Grand Slam singles titles	WTA singles titles	Total singles titles	Earnings ($)	Money list rank
2010	0	0	0	277,062	73
2011	0	0	0	623,529	34
2012	0	2	2	1,972,362	9
2013	0	1	1	2,139,358	9
2014	0	0	0	1,862,585	15
2015	0	4	4	1,350,417	14
2016	2	1	3	10,136,615	1
2017	0	0	0	2,148,695	16
2018	1	1	2	5,296,267	3
2019	0	0	0	2,137,816	15
2020	0	0	0	559,321	35
2021	0	1	1	1,462,196	16
2022	0	1	1	558,544	76
2023	0	0	0	–	–
2024	0	0	0	632,712	55
Career	3	11	14	32,519,180	8

- as of 1 August 2024

== Career Grand Slam statistics ==
=== Grand Slam seedings ===
The tournaments won by Kerber are in boldface, and advanced into finals by Kerber are in italics.

Year	Australian Open	French Open	Wimbledon	US Open
2007	did not qualify	not seeded	not seeded	not seeded
2008	not seeded	not seeded	not seeded	did not qualify
2009	not seeded	did not qualify	did not qualify	qualifier
2010	qualifier	not seeded	not seeded	not seeded
2011	not seeded	not seeded	not seeded	not seeded
2012	30th	10th	8th	6th
2013	5th	8th	7th	8th
2014	9th	8th	9th	6th
2015	9th	11th	10th	11th
2016	**7th (1)**	3rd	4th (1)	**2nd (2)**
2017	1st	1st	1st	6th
2018	21st	12th	**11th (3)**	4th
2019	2nd	5th	5th	14th
2020	17th	18th	cancelled	17th
2021	23rd	26th	25th	16th
2022	16th	21st	15th	did not play
2023	did not play	did not play	did not play	did not play
2024	protected ranking	protected ranking	wild card	did not play

=== Best Grand Slam results details ===
Australian Open
2016 Australian Open (7th seed)
Round	Opponent	Rank	Score
1R	(Japan) Misaki Doi	64	6–7^{(4–7)}, 7–6^{(8–6)}, 6–3
2R	(Romania) Alexandra Dulgheru	61	6–2, 6–4
3R	(United States) Madison Brengle	49	6–1, 6–3
4R	(Germany) Annika Beck	55	6–4, 6–0
QF	(Belarus) Victoria Azarenka (14)	16	6–3, 7–5
SF	(United Kingdom) Johanna Konta	47	7–5, 6–2
**W**	(United States) Serena Williams (1)	**1**	6–4, 3–6, 6–4

French Open
2012 French Open (10th Seed)
Round	Opponent	Rank	Score
1R	(China) Zhang Shuai (Q)	169	6–3, 6–4
2R	(Belarus) Olga Govortsova	77	6–3, 6–2
3R	(Italy) Flavia Pennetta (18)	20	4–6, 6–3, 6–2
4R	(Croatia) Petra Martić	50	6–3, 7–5
QF	(Italy) Sara Errani (21)	24	3–6, 6–7^{(2–7)}
2018 French Open (12th Seed)
Round	Opponent	Rank	Score
1R	(Germany) Mona Barthel	117	6–2, 6–3
2R	(Romania) Ana Bogdan	66	6–2, 6–3
3R	(Netherlands) Kiki Bertens (18)	22	7–6^{(7–4)}, 7–6^{(7–4)}
4R	(France) Caroline Garcia (7)	7	6–2, 6–3
QF	(Romania) Simona Halep (1)	**1**	7–6^{(7–2)}, 3–6, 2–6

Wimbledon Championships
2018 Wimbledon (11th seed)
Round	Opponent	Rank	Score
1R	(Russia) Vera Zvonareva (Q)	142	7–5, 6–3
2R	(United States) Claire Liu (Q)	237	3–6, 6–2, 6–4
3R	(Japan) Naomi Osaka (18)	18	6–2, 6–4
4R	(Switzerland) Belinda Bencic	56	6–3, 7–6^{(7–5)}
QF	(Russia) Daria Kasatkina (14)	14	6–3, 7–5
SF	(Latvia) Jeļena Ostapenko (12)	12	6–3, 6–3
**W**	(United States) Serena Williams (25)	181	6–3, 6–3

US Open
2016 US Open (2nd seed)
Round	Opponent	Rank	Score
1R	(Slovenia) Polona Hercog	120	6–0, 1–0 ret.
2R	(Croatia) Mirjana Lučić-Baroni	57	6–2, 7–6^{(9–7)}
3R	(United States) CiCi Bellis (Q)	158	6–1, 6–1
4R	(Czech Republic) Petra Kvitová (14)	16	6–3, 7–5
QF	(Italy) Roberta Vinci (7)	8	7–5, 6–0
SF	(Denmark) Caroline Wozniacki	74	6–4, 6–3
**W**	(Czech Republic) Karolína Plíšková (10)	11	6–3, 4–6, 6–4

== Wins over top-10 players ==
Kerber has a 43–71 record against players who were, at the time the match was played, ranked in the top 10.

Season	2012	2013	2014	2015	2016	2017	2018	2019	2020	2021	2022	2023	2024	Total
Wins	8	3	2	5	12	1	6	2	0	3	0	0	1	43

#	Player	Rk	Event	Surface	Rd	Score	Rk
2012
1.	(Russia) Maria Sharapova	3	Open GDF Suez, France	Hard (i)	QF	6–4, 6–4	27
2.	(France) Marion Bartoli	7	Open GDF Suez, France	Hard (i)	F	7–6^{(7–3)}, 5–7, 6–3	27
3.	(China) Li Na	8	Indian Wells Open, United States	Hard	QF	6–4, 6–2	19
4.	(Denmark) Caroline Wozniacki	6	Danish Open, Denmark	Hard (i)	F	6–4, 6–4	14
5.	(Denmark) Caroline Wozniacki	6	Stuttgart Open, Germany	Clay (i)	2R	6–1, 6–2	14
6.	(Czech Republic) Petra Kvitová	4	Italian Open, Italy	Clay	QF	7–6^{(7–2)}, 1–6, 6–1	11
7.	(United States) Serena Williams	4	Cincinnati Open, United States	Hard	QF	6–4, 6–4	7
8.	(Czech Republic) Petra Kvitová	5	Cincinnati Open, United States	Hard	SF	6–1, 2–6, 6–4	7
2013
9.	(Poland) Agnieszka Radwańska	4	Pan Pacific Open, Japan	Hard	QF	6–4, 6–4	9
10.	(Denmark) Caroline Wozniacki	8	Pan Pacific Open, Japan	Hard	SF	6–4, 7–6^{(7–5)}	9
11.	(Poland) Agnieszka Radwańska	4	WTA Finals, Turkey	Hard (i)	RR	6–2, 6–2	9
2014
12.	(Serbia) Jelena Janković	8	Qatar Open, Qatar	Hard	SF	6–1, 7–6^{(8–6)}	9
13.	(Russia) Maria Sharapova	5	Wimbledon, United Kingdom	Grass	4R	7–6^{(7–4)}, 4–6, 6–4	7
2015
14.	(Russia) Maria Sharapova	2	Stuttgart Open, Germany	Clay (i)	2R	2–6, 7–5, 6–1	14
15.	(Russia) Ekaterina Makarova	8	Stuttgart Open, Germany	Clay (i)	QF	6–3, 6–2	14
16.	(Denmark) Caroline Wozniacki	5	Stuttgart Open, Germany	Clay (i)	F	3–6, 6–1, 7–5	14
17.	(Poland) Agnieszka Radwańska	7	Stanford Classic, United States	Hard	QF	4–6, 6–4, 6–4	14
18.	(Czech Republic) Petra Kvitová	5	WTA Finals, Singapore	Hard (i)	RR	6–2, 7–6^{(7–3)}	7
2016
19.	(United States) Serena Williams	1	Australian Open, Australia	Hard	F	6–4, 3–6, 6–4	6
20.	(Romania) Simona Halep	6	Fed Cup, Romania	Clay (i)	PO	6–2, 6–2	3
21.	(Czech Republic) Petra Kvitová	7	Stuttgart Open, Germany	Clay (i)	SF	6–4, 4–6, 6–2	3
22.	(Romania) Simona Halep	5	Wimbledon, United Kingdom	Grass	QF	7–5, 7–6^{(7–2)}	4
23.	(United States) Venus Williams	8	Wimbledon, United Kingdom	Grass	SF	6–4, 6–4	4
24.	(United States) Madison Keys	9	Rio Olympics, Brazil	Hard	SF	6–3, 7–5	2
25.	(Romania) Simona Halep	4	Cincinnati Open, United States	Hard	SF	6–3, 6–4	2
26.	(Italy) Roberta Vinci	8	US Open, United States	Hard	QF	7–5, 6–0	2
27.	(Slovakia) Dominika Cibulková	8	WTA Finals, Singapore	Hard (i)	RR	7–6^{(7–5)}, 2–6, 6–3	1
28.	(Romania) Simona Halep	4	WTA Finals, Singapore	Hard (i)	RR	6–4, 6–2	1
29.	(United States) Madison Keys	7	WTA Finals, Singapore	Hard (i)	RR	6–3, 6–3	1
30.	(Poland) Agnieszka Radwańska	3	WTA Finals, Singapore	Hard (i)	SF	6–2, 6–1	1
2017
31.	(Czech Republic) Karolína Plíšková	4	Pan Pacific Open, Japan	Hard	QF	7–6^{(7–5)}, 7–5	14
2018
32.	(United States) Venus Williams	5	Sydney International, Australia	Hard	2R	5–7, 6–3, 6–1	22
33.	(Czech Republic) Karolína Plíšková	5	Dubai Championships, UAE	Hard	QF	6–4, 6–3	9
34.	(France) Caroline Garcia	7	Indian Wells Open, United States	Hard	4R	6–1, 6–1	10
35.	(Czech Republic) Petra Kvitová	10	Stuttgart Open, Germany	Clay (i)	1R	6–3, 6–2	12
36.	(France) Caroline Garcia	7	French Open, France	Clay	4R	6–2, 6–3	12
37.	(Japan) Naomi Osaka	4	WTA Finals, Singapore	Hard (i)	RR	6–4, 5–7, 6–4	2
2019
38.	(Belarus) Aryna Sabalenka	9	Indian Wells Open, United States	Hard	4R	6–1, 4–6, 6–4	8
39.	(Romania) Simona Halep	7	Eastbourne International, UK	Grass	QF	6–4, 6–3	5
2021
40.	(Romania) Simona Halep	3	Italian Open, Italy	Clay	2R	1–6, 3–3 ret.	26
41.	(Ukraine) Elina Svitolina	6	Cincinnati Open, United States	Hard	2R	7–5, 2–6, 6–4	22
42.	(Czech Republic) Barbora Krejčíková	3	Billie Jean King Cup, Czech Republic	Hard (i)	RR	6–7^{(5–7)}, 6–0, 6–4	9
2024
43.	(Latvia) Jeļena Ostapenko	10	Indian Wells Open, United States	Hard	2R	5–7, 6–3, 6–3	607

== Longest winning streak ==
11–match singles winning streak (2015)

#	Tournament	Start date	Surface	Rd	Opponent	Rank	Score
–	Miami Open, United States	23 March 2015	Hard	3R	(Russia) Svetlana Kuznetsova (24)	No. 29	3–6, 6–3, 3–6
1	Charleston Open, United States	6 April 2015	Clay	2R	(Russia) Evgeniya Rodina	No. 90	3–6, 6–3, 6–4
2	Charleston Open, United States	6 April 2015	Clay	3R	(Spain) Lara Arruabarrena	No. 83	6–3, 6–0
3	Charleston Open, United States	6 April 2015	Clay	QF	(Romania) Irina-Camelia Begu (13)	No. 36	7–6^{(7–3)}, 7–6^{(7–4)}
4	Charleston Open, United States	6 April 2015	Clay	SF	(Germany) Andrea Petkovic (3)	No. 11	6–4, 6–4
5	Charleston Open, United States	6 April 2015	Clay	F	(United States) Madison Keys (7)	No. 20	6–2, 4–6, 7–5
6	Fed Cup semifinal, Russia	18 April 2015	Clay (i)	–	(Russia) Anastasia Pavlyuchenkova	No. 38	6–1, 6–0
7	Stuttgart Open, Germany	20 April 2015	Clay	1R	(United States) Alexa Glatch (LL)	No. 201	6–2, 7–5
8	Stuttgart Open, Germany	20 April 2015	Clay	2R	(Russia) Maria Sharapova (1)	No. 2	2–6, 7–5, 6–1
9	Stuttgart Open, Germany	20 April 2015	Clay	QF	(Russia) Ekaterina Makarova (6)	No. 8	6–3, 6–2
10	Stuttgart Open, Germany	20 April 2015	Clay	SF	(United States) Madison Brengle	No. 43	6–3, 6–1
11	Stuttgart Open, Germany	20 April 2015	Clay	F	(Denmark) Caroline Wozniacki (4)	No. 5	3–6, 6–1, 7–5
–	Madrid Open, Spain	2 May 2015	Clay	1R	(Australia) Samantha Stosur	No. 26	6–4, 3–6, 3–6

== Double bagel matches (6–0, 6–0) ==
Result	No.	Year	Opponent	Rank	Tournament	Surface	Round	AK Rank
Win	1.	2007	(Russia) Olga Puchkova	No. 32	Birmingham Classic, United Kingdom	Grass	1R	No. 85
Win	2.	2015	(Germany) Carina Witthöft	No. 53	Wimbledon, United Kingdom	Grass	1R	No. 10
Win	3.	2021	(Mexico) Renata Zarazúa	No. 147	Miami Open, United States	Hard	2R	No. 26

== National participation ==
Tournament	2007	2008	2009	2010	2011	2012	2013	2014	2015	2016	2017	2018	2019	2020–21	2022	2023	2024	W–L
Billie Jean King Cup
World Group / Finals	NP	A	NP	A	NP	QF	NP	F	SF	QF	A	SF	A	RR	NP	A	A	9–7
Play-offs / Qualifiers	PO	PO	A	A	A	PO	PO	NP		PO	PO	NP	A	A	QR	A	QR	5–8
Win–loss	0–2	0–1	0–0	0–0	0–0	2–1	1–1	4–2	2–1	3–1	1–1	0–2	0–0	1–1	0–2	0–0	0–0	14–15
Other team competitions
United Cup	not held															A	W	2–5
Hopman Cup	NP		A	A	NP		A	NP		A	A	F	F	not held		NP		12–4

Note: All Billie Jean King Cup matches were singles. United Cup: singles 1–4, mixed doubles 1–1. Hopman Cup: singles 8–0, mixed doubles 4–4.
Levels in which Germany did not compete in a particular year are marked "NP".

=== Olympic Games (12–7) ===
Matches by type Singles (11–3) Doubles (1–3) Mixed doubles (0–1)	Matches by medal finals Gold medal final (0–1)

Venue	Surface	Match type	Round	Opponent player(s)	W/L	Match score
2012
London	Grass	Singles	1R	(Czech Republic) Petra Cetkovská	Win	6–1, 3–0 ret.
London	Grass	Singles	2R	(Hungary) Tímea Babos	Win	6–1, 6–1
London	Grass	Singles	3R	(United States) Venus Williams	Win	7–6^{(7–5)}, 7–6^{(7–5)}
London	Grass	Singles	QF	(Belarus) Victoria Azarenka	Loss	4–6, 5–7
London	Grass	Doubles (w/ Sabine Lisicki)	1R	(United Kingdom) Laura Robson / Heather Watson	Win	4–6, 6–4, 6–3
London	Grass	Doubles (w/ Sabine Lisicki)	2R	(Austria) Serena Williams / Venus Williams	Loss	2–6, 5–7
London	Grass	Mixed doubles (w/ Philipp Petzschner)	1R	(Belarus) Victoria Azarenka / Max Mirnyi	Loss	2–6, 2–6
2016
Rio de Janeiro	Hard	Singles	1R	(Colombia) Mariana Duque Mariño	Win	6–3, 7–5
Rio de Janeiro	Hard	Singles	2R	(Canada) Eugenie Bouchard	Win	6–4, 6–2
Rio de Janeiro	Hard	Singles	3R	(Australia) Samantha Stosur	Win	6–0, 7–5
Rio de Janeiro	Hard	Singles	QF	(United Kingdom) Johanna Konta	Win	6–1, 6–2
Rio de Janeiro	Hard	Singles	SF	(United States) Madison Keys	Win	6–3, 7–5
Rio de Janeiro	Hard	Singles	F	(Puerto Rico) Monica Puig	Loss	4–6, 6–4, 1–6
Rio de Janeiro	Hard	Doubles (w/ Andrea Petkovic)	1R	(Italy) Sara Errani / Roberta Vinci	Loss	2–6, 2–6
2024
Paris	Clay	Singles	1R	(Japan) Naomi Osaka	Win	7–5, 6–3
Paris	Clay	Singles	2R	(Romania) Jaqueline Cristian	Win	6–4, 3–6, 6–4
Paris	Clay	Singles	3R	(Canada) Leylah Fernandez	Win	6–4, 6–3
Paris	Clay	Singles	QF	(China) Zheng Qinwen	Loss	7–6^{(7–4)}, 4–6, 6–7^{(6–8)}
Paris	Clay	Doubles (w/ Laura Siegemund)	1R	(United Kingdom) Katie Boulter / Heather Watson	Loss	2–6, 3–6
