= 2012 e-Boks Open =

- Date: 9–15 April
- Edition: 3rd
- Category: WTA International
- Draw: 32S / 16D
- Prize money: $220,000
- Surface: Hard (i)
- Location: Farum, Denmark

Champions

Singles
- (Germany) Angelique Kerber

Doubles
- (Japan) Kimiko Date-Krumm / (Japan) Rika Fujiwara
- Danish Open

The 2012 e-Boks Open was the third and final edition of the tennis tournament e-Boks Danish Open, an international-level tournament on the 2012 WTA Tour. It took place on indoor hard courts in Farum, Denmark between 9 April and 15 April 2012. Second-seeded Angelique Kerber won the singles title.

== Finals ==
=== Singles ===
(Germany) Angelique Kerber defeated (Denmark) Caroline Wozniacki, 6–4, 6–4

- It was Kerber's 2nd and last singles title of the year and the 2nd of her career.

=== Doubles ===
(Japan) Kimiko Date-Krumm / (Japan) Rika Fujiwara defeated (Sweden) Sofia Arvidsson / (Estonia) Kaia Kanepi, 6–2, 4–6, [10–5]

== Singles main-draw entrants ==
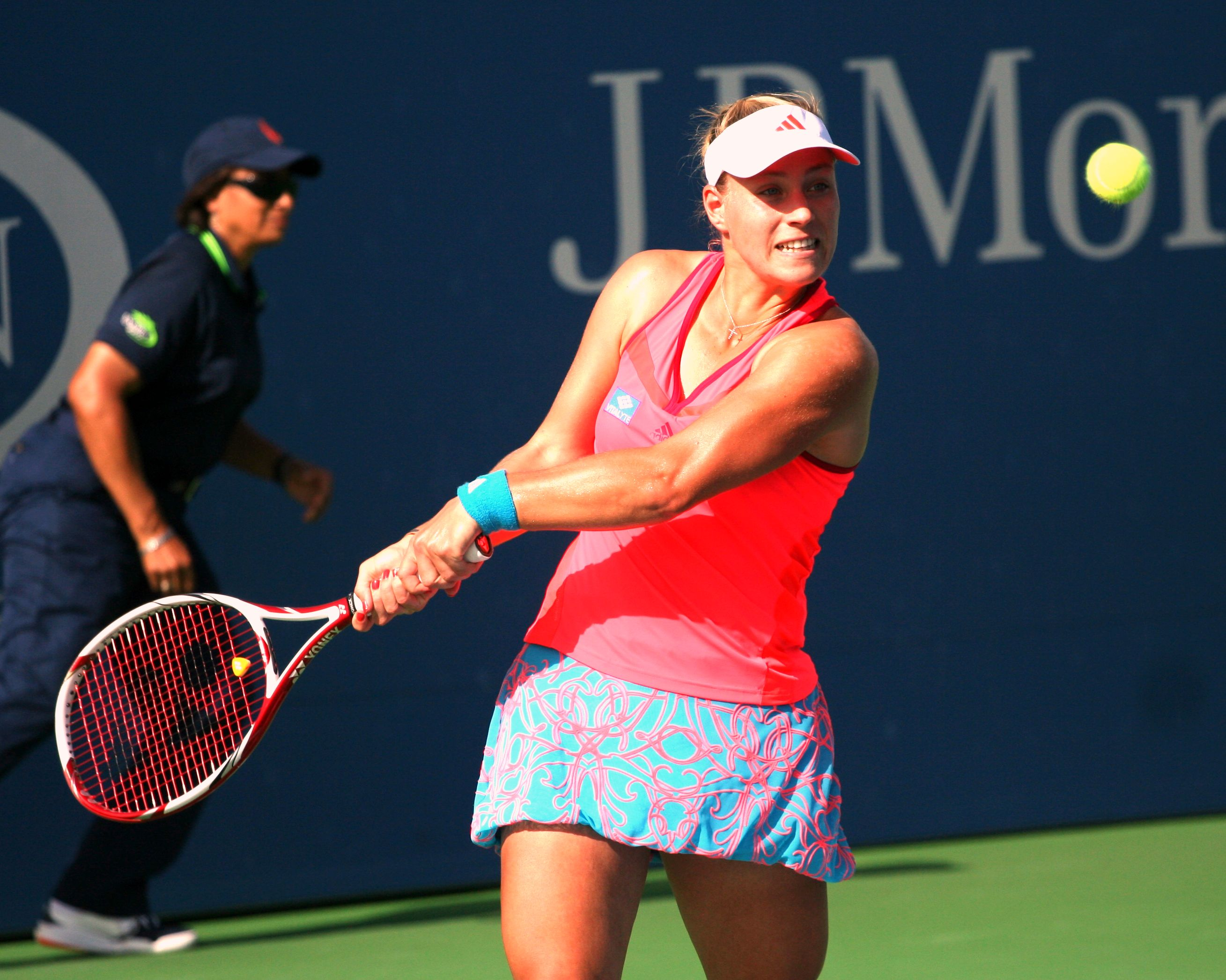
Angelique Kerber at 2012 e-Boks Open

=== Seeds ===
Country	Player	Rank*	Seed
DEN	Caroline Wozniacki	6	1
GER	Angelique Kerber	16	2
SRB	Jelena Janković	17	3
ROU	Monica Niculescu	29	4
EST	Kaia Kanepi	34	5
GER	Mona Barthel	36	6
KAZ	Ksenia Pervak	38	7
SWE	Sofia Arvidsson	55	8

- ^{1} Rankings are as of April 2, 2012

=== Other entrants ===
The following players received wildcards into the main draw:

- (Denmark) Karen Barbat
- (Denmark) Malou Ejdesgaard
- (Russia) Yulia Putintseva

The following players received entry from the qualifying draw:

- (Germany) Annika Beck
- (Russia) Anna Chakvetadze
- (Hungary) Melinda Czink
- (Australia) Johanna Konta

=== Withdrawals ===
- (Luxembourg) Mandy Minella (back injury)
- (Kazakhstan) Galina Voskoboeva

=== Retirements ===
- (Kazakhstan) Ksenia Pervak (gastritis)

== Doubles main-draw entrants ==
=== Seeds ===
Country	Player	Country	Player	Rank^{1}	Seed
GER	Anna-Lena Grönefeld	CRO	Petra Martić	109	1
AUS	Anastasia Rodionova	RUS	Arina Rodionova	119	2
JPN	Kimiko Date-Krumm	JPN	Rika Fujiwara	120	3
GER	Kristina Barrois	ITA	Alberta Brianti	126	4

- ^{1} Rankings are as of April 2, 2012

=== Other entrants ===
The following pairs received wildcards into the doubles main draw:

- (Denmark) Karen Barbat / (Denmark) Mai Grage
- (Denmark) Malou Ejdesgaard / (Denmark) Caroline Wozniacki

The following pair received entry as alternates:

- (Croatia) Maria Abramović / (Australia) Daniella Jeflea

=== Withdrawals ===
- (France) Kristina Mladenovic (right ankle injury)
