= 2016 Brisbane International – Men's doubles =

Coordinates: 27°31′30″S 153°0′26″E

Men's doubles
- 2016 Brisbane International

Final
- Champions: (Finland) Henri Kontinen (Australia) John Peers
- Runners-up: (Australia) James Duckworth (Australia) Chris Guccione
- Score: 7–6^{(7–4)}, 6–1

Events
| Singles | men | women |
| Doubles | men | women |
- Brisbane International

Jamie Murray and John Peers were the defending champions, but Murray chose to compete in Doha instead. Peers played alongside Henri Kontinen and successfully defended his title, defeating James Duckworth and Chris Guccione in the final, 7–6^{(7–4)}, 6–1.

== Seeds ==
1. (France) Pierre-Hugues Herbert / (France) Nicolas Mahut (quarterfinals)
2. (Finland) Henri Kontinen / (Australia) John Peers (champions)
3. (Poland) Łukasz Kubot / (Poland) Marcin Matkowski (quarterfinals)
4. (United Kingdom) Dominic Inglot / (Sweden) Robert Lindstedt (semifinals)

== Draw ==
Key

- Q = Qualifier
- WC = Wild card
- LL = Lucky loser
- Alt = Alternate
- ITF = ITF entry
- PR = Protected ranking
- SR = Special ranking
- SE = Special exempt
- JE = Junior exempt
- JR = Junior Accelerator Programme entrant
- CO = College Accelerator Programme entrant
- NG = Next Gen Accelerator Program entrant
- w/o = Walkover
- r = Retired
- d = Defaulted

=== Draw ===
First round
1 | (France) P-H Herbert (France) N Mahut | 6 | 3 | [13]
(Brazil) T Bellucci (United States) S Johnson | 4 | 6 | [11]
(Bulgaria) G Dimitrov (Japan) K Nishikori | 7^{7} | 6
(Czech Republic) L Dlouhý (Austria) D Thiem | 6^{5} | 2
3 | (Poland) Ł Kubot (Poland) M Matkowski | 6 | 6
(United Kingdom) J Marray (Pakistan) A-u-H Qureshi | 3 | 4
(France) L Pouille (France) G Simon | 6 | 2 | [2]
WC | (Australia) J Duckworth (Australia) C Guccione | 2 | 6 | [10]
WC | (Australia) M Reid (Australia) J-P Smith | 7^{7} | 6
(Croatia) M Pavić (New Zealand) M Venus | 6^{1} | 4
(United States) E Butorac (United States) S Lipsky | 6^{5} | 6 | [7]
4 | (United Kingdom) D Inglot (Sweden) R Lindstedt | 7^{7} | 4 | [10]
(Croatia) I Dodig (Australia) S Groth | 6 | 3 | [10]
(Serbia) D Lajović (Serbia) V Troicki | 3 | 6 | [3]
(Canada) D Nestor (Czech Republic) R Štěpánek | 3 | 3
2 | (Finland) H Kontinen (Australia) J Peers | 6 | 6

Quarterfinals
1 | (France) P-H Herbert (France) N Mahut | 6 | 1 | [7]
(Bulgaria) G Dimitrov (Japan) K Nishikori | 4 | 6 | [10]
3 | (Poland) Ł Kubot (Poland) M Matkowski | 6 | 3 | [4]
WC | (Australia) J Duckworth (Australia) C Guccione | 3 | 6 | [10]
WC | (Australia) M Reid (Australia) J-P Smith | 6^{0} | 2
4 | (United Kingdom) D Inglot (Sweden) R Lindstedt | 7^{7} | 6
(Croatia) I Dodig (Australia) S Groth | 6^{2} | 3
2 | (Finland) H Kontinen (Australia) J Peers | 7^{7} | 6

Semifinals
(Bulgaria) G Dimitrov (Japan) K Nishikori
WC | (Australia) J Duckworth (Australia) C Guccione | w/o
4 | (United Kingdom) D Inglot (Sweden) R Lindstedt | 4 | 3
2 | (Finland) H Kontinen (Australia) J Peers | 6 | 6

Final
WC | (Australia) J Duckworth (Australia) C Guccione | 6^{4} | 1
2 | (Finland) H Kontinen (Australia) J Peers | 7^{7} | 6
