= 2016 Brisbane International – Men's singles =

Men's singles
- 2016 Brisbane International

Final
- Champion: (Canada) Milos Raonic
- Runner-up: (Switzerland) Roger Federer
- Score: 6–4, 6–4

Details
- Draw: 28 (4 Q / 3 WC )
- Seeds: 8

Events
Singles	men	women
Doubles	men	women
- Brisbane International

Roger Federer was the defending champion, but lost in the final to Milos Raonic, 4–6, 4–6.

== Seeds ==
The top four seeds receive a bye into the second round.

1. (Switzerland) Roger Federer (final)
2. (Japan) Kei Nishikori (quarterfinals)
3. (Croatia) Marin Čilić (quarterfinals)
4. (Canada) Milos Raonic (champion)
5. (France) Gilles Simon (first round)
6. (Belgium) David Goffin (second round)
7. (Australia) Bernard Tomic (semifinals)
8. (Austria) Dominic Thiem (semifinals)

== Draw ==
=== Finals ===
Semifinals
1	(Switzerland) Roger Federer	6	6
8	(Austria) Dominic Thiem	1	4
4	(Canada) Milos Raonic	7^{7}	7^{7}
7	(Australia) Bernard Tomic	6^{5}	6^{5}

Final
1	(Switzerland) Roger Federer	4	4
4	(Canada) Milos Raonic	6	6

=== Top half ===
First round
WC	(Australia) B Mitchell	2	4
Q	(Germany) T Kamke	6	6
(Serbia) V Troicki	7^{7}	6
(United States) S Johnson	6^{3}	1
(Bulgaria) G Dimitrov	6	7^{12}
5	(France) G Simon	3	6^{10}
(South Korea) H Chung	7^{10}	6
(Australia) S Groth	6^{8}	4
WC	(Australia) J-P Smith	6	3	2
(United States) D Kudla	4	6	6
WC	(Australia) J Duckworth	6	4	3
8	(Austria) D Thiem	3	6	6

Second round
1	(Switzerland) R Federer	6	6
Q	(Germany) T Kamke	2	1
(Serbia) V Troicki	7	6^{6}	2
(Bulgaria) G Dimitrov	5	7^{8}	6
3	(Croatia) M Čilić	7	7^{7}
(South Korea) H Chung	5	6^{3}
(United States) D Kudla	3	2
8	(Austria) D Thiem	6	6

Quarterfinals
1	(Switzerland) R Federer	6	6^{4}	6
(Bulgaria) G Dimitrov	4	7^{7}	4
3	(Croatia) M Čilić	6	6^{4}	4
8	(Austria) D Thiem	2	7^{7}	6

Semifinals
1	(Switzerland) R Federer	6	6
8	(Austria) D Thiem	1	4

=== Bottom half ===
First round
6	(Belgium) D Goffin	6	6
(Brazil) T Bellucci	4	4
Q	(Japan) Y Nishioka	6	3	5
(France) L Pouille	4	6	7
Q	(Croatia) I Dodig	6	6
Q	(Australia) O Anderson	3	2
7	(Australia) B Tomic	6	6
(France) N Mahut	4	3
PR	(Czech Republic) R Štěpánek	6	6
(Serbia) D Lajović	0	3
(Uzbekistan) D Istomin	2	5
(Kazakhstan) M Kukushkin	6	7

Second round
6	(Belgium) D Goffin	6^{5}	6	3
(France) L Pouille	7^{7}	4	6
Q	(Croatia) I Dodig	7^{7}	1	4
4	(Canada) M Raonic	6^{2}	6	6
7	(Australia) B Tomic	7^{8}	4	7^{7}
PR	(Czech Republic) R Štěpánek	6^{6}	6	6^{4}
(Kazakhstan) M Kukushkin	3	4
2	(Japan) K Nishikori	6	6

Quarterfinals
(France) L Pouille	4	4
4	(Canada) M Raonic	6	6
7	(Australia) B Tomic	6	1	6
2	(Japan) K Nishikori	3	6	3

Semifinals
4	(Canada) M Raonic	7^{7}	7^{7}
7	(Australia) B Tomic	6^{5}	6^{5}

== Qualifying ==
=== Seeds ===
1. (Latvia) Ernests Gulbis (qualifying competition)
2. (Croatia) Ivan Dodig (qualified)
3. (Netherlands) Thiemo de Bakker (first round)
4. (United States) Tim Smyczek (qualifying competition)
5. (Japan) Yoshihito Nishioka (qualified)
6. (United States) Jared Donaldson (qualifying competition)
7. (Slovakia) Norbert Gombos (first round)
8. (United States) Dennis Novikov (first round)

=== Qualifiers ===
1. (Japan) Yoshihito Nishioka
2. (Croatia) Ivan Dodig
3. (Germany) Tobias Kamke
4. (Australia) Oliver Anderson

=== Qualifying draw ===
==== First qualifier ====
First round
1	(Latvia) Ernests Gulbis	6	6
(Romania) Marius Copil	4	2
(Poland) Łukasz Kubot	2	0
5	(Japan) Yoshihito Nishioka	6	6

Qualifying competition
1	(Latvia) Ernests Gulbis	3	4
5	(Japan) Yoshihito Nishioka	6	6

==== Second qualifier ====
First round
2	(Croatia) Ivan Dodig	6	6
WC	(Australia) Omar Jasika	1	3
(France) Pierre-Hugues Herbert	6	3	4
6	(United States) Jared Donaldson	3	6	6

Qualifying competition
2	(Croatia) Ivan Dodig	6	3	6
6	(United States) Jared Donaldson	3	6	4

==== Third qualifier ====
First round
3	(Netherlands) Thiemo de Bakker	4	6^{3}
(Estonia) Jürgen Zopp	6	7^{7}
(Germany) Tobias Kamke	6	7
7	(Slovakia) Norbert Gombos	2	5

Qualifying competition
(Estonia) Jürgen Zopp	3	2
(Germany) Tobias Kamke	6	6

==== Fourth qualifier ====
First round
4	(United States) Tim Smyczek	6	6^{5}	6
(Australia) Matt Reid	3	7^{7}	3
WC	(Australia) Oliver Anderson	3	6	6
8	(United States) Dennis Novikov	6	4	4

Qualifying competition
4	(United States) Tim Smyczek	7^{7}	6^{1}	2
WC	(Australia) Oliver Anderson	6^{3}	7^{7}	6
