= 2012 e-Boks Open – Doubles =

Doubles
- 2012 e-Boks Open

Final
- Champions: (Japan) Kimiko Date-Krumm (Japan) Rika Fujiwara
- Runners-up: (Sweden) Sofia Arvidsson (Estonia) Kaia Kanepi
- Score: 6–2, 4–6, [10–5]

Details
- Draw: 16
- Seeds: 4

Events
Singles	Doubles
- Danish Open

Johanna Larsson and Jasmin Wöhr were the defending champions, but they lost in the second round to second seeded Anastasia Rodionova and Arina Rodionova.
Kimiko Date-Krumm and Rika Fujiwara won the title after defeating Sofia Arvidsson and Kaia Kanepi 6–2, 4–6, [10–5] in the final.

== Seeds ==
1. (Germany) Anna-Lena Grönefeld / (Croatia) Petra Martić (first round)
2. (Australia) Anastasia Rodionova / (Russia) Arina Rodionova (semifinals)
3. (Japan) Kimiko Date-Krumm / (Japan) Rika Fujiwara (champions)
4. (Germany) Kristina Barrois / (Italy) Alberta Brianti (quarterfinals)

== Draw ==
Key

- Q = Qualifier
- WC = Wild card
- LL = Lucky loser
- Alt = Alternate
- ITF = ITF entry
- PR = Protected ranking
- SR = Special ranking
- SE = Special exempt
- JE = Junior exempt
- JR = Junior Accelerator Programme entrant
- CO = College Accelerator Programme entrant
- NG = Next Gen Accelerator Program entrant
- w/o = Walkover
- r = Retired
- d = Defaulted

=== Draw ===
First round
1	(Germany) A-L Grönefeld (Croatia) P Martić	4	3
(France) A Cornet (France) P Parmentier	6	6
(Ukraine) L Kichenok (Ukraine) N Kichenok	6	1	[4]
(France) S Foretz Gacon (Germany) T Malek	4	6	[10]
4	(Germany) K Barrois (Italy) A Brianti	6	6
WC	(Denmark) K Barbat (Denmark) M Grage	3	3
Alt	(Croatia) M Abramović (Australia) D Jeflea	4	2
(Sweden) S Arvidsson (Estonia) K Kanepi	6	6
(United Kingdom) A Keothavong (Russia) V Savinykh	6	4	[9]
(Latvia) L Dekmeijere (Russia) M Kondratieva	0	6	[11]
(Germany) A Kerber (Poland) U Radwańska	6	3	[8]
3	(Japan) K Date-Krumm (Japan) R Fujiwara	2	6	[10]
(Sweden) J Larsson (Germany) J Wöhr	6	6
WC	(Denmark) M Ejdesgaard (Denmark) C Wozniacki	2	4
(Hungary) K Marosi (Germany) K Wörle	2	6	[9]
2	(Australia) An Rodionova (Russia) Ar Rodionova	6	2	[11]

Quarterfinals
(France) A Cornet (France) P Parmentier	6	6
(France) S Foretz Gacon (Germany) T Malek	3	3
4	(Germany) K Barrois (Italy) A Brianti	6^{6}	4
(Sweden) S Arvidsson (Estonia) K Kanepi	7^{8}	6
(Latvia) L Dekmeijere (Russia) M Kondratieva	3	2
3	(Japan) K Date-Krumm (Japan) R Fujiwara	6	6
(Sweden) J Larsson (Germany) J Wöhr	6^{4}	4
2	(Australia) An Rodionova (Russia) Ar Rodionova	7^{7}	6

Semifinals
(France) A Cornet (France) P Parmentier	3	6	[7]
(Sweden) S Arvidsson (Estonia) K Kanepi	6	1	[10]
3	(Japan) K Date-Krumm (Japan) R Fujiwara	6	6
2	(Australia) An Rodionova (Russia) Ar Rodionova	3	0

Final
(Sweden) S Arvidsson (Estonia) K Kanepi	2	6	[5]
3	(Japan) K Date-Krumm (Japan) R Fujiwara	6	4	[10]
