= 2012 e-Boks Open – Singles =

Singles
- 2012 e-Boks Open

Final
- Champion: (Germany) Angelique Kerber
- Runner-up: (Denmark) Caroline Wozniacki
- Score: 6–4, 6–4

Details
- Draw: 32
- Seeds: 8

Events
| Singles | Doubles |
- Danish Open

Caroline Wozniacki was the defending champion, but lost to Angelique Kerber 6–4, 6–4 in the final.

== Seeds ==
1. (Denmark) Caroline Wozniacki (final)
2. (Germany) Angelique Kerber (champion)
3. (Serbia) Jelena Janković (semifinals)
4. (Romania) Monica Niculescu (second round)
5. (Estonia) Kaia Kanepi (quarterfinals)
6. (Germany) Mona Barthel (quarterfinals)
7. (Kazakhstan) Ksenia Pervak (first round, retired)
8. (Sweden) Sofia Arvidsson (first round)

== Draw ==
Key

- Q = Qualifier
- WC = Wild card
- LL = Lucky loser
- Alt = Alternate
- ITF = ITF entry
- PR = Protected ranking
- SR = Special ranking
- SE = Special exempt
- JE = Junior exempt
- JR = Junior Accelerator Programme entrant
- CO = College Accelerator Programme entrant
- NG = Next Gen Accelerator Program entrant
- w/o = Walkover
- r = Retired
- d = Defaulted

=== Finals ===
Semifinals
1 | (Denmark) Caroline Wozniacki | 6 | 6
(Croatia) Petra Martić | 3 | 2
3 | (Serbia) Jelena Janković | 2 | 1
2 | (Germany) Angelique Kerber | 6 | 6

Final
1 | (Denmark) Caroline Wozniacki | 4 | 4
2 | (Germany) Angelique Kerber | 6 | 6

=== Top half ===
First round
1 | (Denmark) C Wozniacki | 7^{7} | 6
(Poland) U Radwańska | 6^{4} | 2
Q | (Russia) A Chakvetadze | 5 | 1
(France) P Parmentier | 7 | 6
(France) A Cornet | 6 | 6
WC | (Denmark) M Ejdesgaard | 0 | 0
(Austria) P Mayr-Achleitner | 7 | 5 | 6
8 | (Sweden) S Arvidsson | 5 | 7 | 1
4 | (Romania) M Niculescu | 6 | 6
(Russia) V Savinykh | 2 | 2
(Serbia) B Jovanovski | 6 | 6
(Switzerland) S Vögele | 3 | 4
Q | (Germany) A Beck | 4 | 4
(Croatia) P Martić | 6 | 6
Q | (Australia) J Konta | 6 | 1
7 | (Kazakhstan) K Pervak | 3 | 0^{r}

Second round
1 | (Denmark) C Wozniacki | 6 | 6
(France) P Parmentier | 2 | 1
(France) A Cornet | 6 | 2 | 7
(Austria) P Mayr-Achleitner | 2 | 6 | 5
4 | (Romania) M Niculescu | 7^{8} | 4 | 1
(Serbia) B Jovanovski | 6^{6} | 6 | 6
(Croatia) P Martić | 6 | 6
Q | (Australia) J Konta | 2 | 3

Quarterfinals
1 | (Denmark) C Wozniacki | 6 | 6
(France) A Cornet | 0 | 3
(Serbia) B Jovanovski | 4 | 6 | 3
(Croatia) P Martić | 6 | 4 | 6

Semifinals
1 | (Denmark) C Wozniacki | 6 | 6
(Croatia) P Martić | 3 | 2

=== Bottom half ===
First round
5 | (Estonia) K Kanepi | 6 | 6
(Australia) A Rodionova | 3 | 4
(Hungary) T Babos | 1 | 7^{7} | 7
(Japan) K Date-Krumm | 6 | 6^{4} | 5
WC | (Russia) Y Putintseva | 6 | 7
WC | (Denmark) K Barbat | 4 | 5
(United Kingdom) L Robson | 4 | 6^{8}
3 | (Serbia) J Janković | 6 | 7^{10}
6 | (Germany) M Barthel | 6 | 6
(Sweden) J Larsson | 3 | 4
(Germany) K Barrois | 2 | 6 | 4
(Italy) A Brianti | 6 | 3 | 6
Q | (Hungary) M Czink | 6 | 2 | 3
(United Kingdom) A Keothavong | 4 | 6 | 6
(France) S Foretz Gacon | 6 | 2 | 5
2 | (Germany) A Kerber | 4 | 6 | 7

Second round
5 | (Estonia) K Kanepi | 7 | 4 | 7^{7}
(Hungary) T Babos | 5 | 6 | 6^{2}
WC | (Russia) Y Putintseva | 3 | 1
3 | (Serbia) J Janković | 6 | 6
6 | (Germany) M Barthel | 6 | 6
(Italy) A Brianti | 3 | 2
(United Kingdom) A Keothavong | 6 | 3 | 3
2 | (Germany) A Kerber | 4 | 6 | 6

Quarterfinals
5 | (Estonia) K Kanepi | 6 | 1 | 3
3 | (Serbia) J Janković | 4 | 6 | 6
6 | (Germany) M Barthel | 2 | 6 | 5
2 | (Germany) A Kerber | 6 | 0 | 7

Semifinals
3 | (Serbia) J Janković | 2 | 1
2 | (Germany) A Kerber | 6 | 6

== Qualifying ==
=== Seeds ===
1. (Ukraine) Lesia Tsurenko (qualifying competition)
2. (Hungary) Melinda Czink (qualified)
3. (Netherlands) Kiki Bertens (first round)
4. (Romania) Mihaela Buzărnescu (first round)
5. (Bulgaria) Elitsa Kostova (first round)
6. (Hungary) Réka-Luca Jani (first round)
7. (France) Kristina Mladenovic (second round)
8. (Germany) Sarah Gronert (second round)

=== Qualifiers ===
1. (Russia) Anna Chakvetadze
2. (Hungary) Melinda Czink
3. (Australia) Johanna Konta
4. (Germany) Annika Beck

=== Draw ===
==== First qualifier ====
First round
1/WC | (Ukraine) Lesia Tsurenko | 6 | 7^{7}
(Russia) Ekaterina Yashina | 3 | 6^{4}
(Netherlands) Richèl Hogenkamp | 6 | 4 | 2
(Slovakia) Kristina Kučová | 4 | 6 | 6
(Russia) Anna Chakvetadze | 6 | 6
WC | (Denmark) Simone Alipieva | 1 | 1
(Slovakia) Zuzana Luknárová | 4 | 6 | 3
8 | (Germany) Sarah Gronert | 6 | 3 | 6

Second round
1/WC | (Ukraine) Lesia Tsurenko | 6 | 6
(Slovakia) Kristina Kučová | 2 | 0
(Russia) Anna Chakvetadze | 6 | 6
8 | (Germany) Sarah Gronert | 1 | 4

Qualifying competition
1/WC | (Ukraine) Lesia Tsurenko | 7 | 4 | 2
(Russia) Anna Chakvetadze | 5 | 6 | 6

==== Second qualifier ====
First round
2 | (Hungary) Melinda Czink | 6 | 7^{7}
(Croatia) Maria Abramović | 3 | 6^{3}
(Germany) Kathrin Wörle | 6 | 6
(Slovakia) Michaela Hončová | 3 | 4
(United Kingdom) Emily Webley-Smith | 6^{5} | 6^{5}
(Switzerland) Amra Sadiković | 7^{7} | 7^{7}
(Russia) Arina Rodionova | 6 | 7^{11}
5 | (Bulgaria) Elitsa Kostova | 4 | 6^{9}

Second round
2 | (Hungary) Melinda Czink | 4 | 6 | 6
(Germany) Kathrin Wörle | 6 | 3 | 2
(Switzerland) Amra Sadiković | 6 | 6
(Russia) Arina Rodionova | 3 | 3

Qualifying competition
2 | (Hungary) Melinda Czink | 2 | 7^{7} | 6
(Switzerland) Amra Sadiković | 6 | 6^{1} | 3

==== Third qualifier ====
First round
3 | (Netherlands) Kiki Bertens | 2 | 1
(Australia) Johanna Konta | 6 | 6
(Slovakia) Lenka Juríková | 6 | 6
WC | (Denmark) Frederikke Svarre | 0 | 0
(Russia) Daria Gavrilova | 1 | 6 | 6
(Ukraine) Irina Buryachok | 6 | 2 | 3
(Lithuania) Lina Stančiūtė | 6 | 6
6 | (Hungary) Réka-Luca Jani | 1 | 0

Second round
(Australia) Johanna Konta | 4 | 6 | 6
(Slovakia) Lenka Juríková | 6 | 4 | 2
(Russia) Daria Gavrilova | 6 | 1 | 6
(Lithuania) Lina Stančiūtė | 3 | 6 | 4

Qualifying competition
(Australia) Johanna Konta | 6 | 6
(Russia) Daria Gavrilova | 3 | 3

==== Fourth qualifier ====
First round
4 | (Romania) Mihaela Buzărnescu | 3 | 6 | 2
(Japan) Rika Fujiwara | 6 | 1 | 6
(Russia) Olga Puchkova | 1 | 2
(Germany) Annika Beck | 6 | 6
WC | (Estonia) Anett Kontaveit | 6 | 6
(Slovakia) Lenka Wienerová | 4 | 1
(Poland) Marta Domachowska | 0 | 3
7 | (France) Kristina Mladenovic | 6 | 6

Second round
(Japan) Rika Fujiwara | 2 | 1
(Germany) Annika Beck | 6 | 6
WC | (Estonia) Anett Kontaveit | 6 | 6^{6} | 6
7 | (France) Kristina Mladenovic | 1 | 7^{8} | 3

Qualifying competition
(Germany) Annika Beck | 4 | 6 | 6
WC | (Estonia) Anett Kontaveit | 6 | 3 | 0
