= 2016 Brisbane International – Women's doubles =

Coordinates: 27°31′30″S 153°0′26″E

Women's doubles
- 2016 Brisbane International

Final
- Champions: (Switzerland) Martina Hingis (India) Sania Mirza
- Runners-up: (Germany) Angelique Kerber (Germany) Andrea Petkovic
- Score: 7–5, 6–1

Details
- Draw: 16
- Seeds: 4

Events
Singles	men	women
Doubles	men	women
- Brisbane International

Martina Hingis and Sabine Lisicki were the defending doubles champions, but Lisicki chose to participate in the Hopman Cup instead. Hingis played alongside Sania Mirza and successfully defended her title, defeating Andrea Petkovic and Angelique Kerber in the final, 7–5, 6–1.

== Seeds ==
1. (Switzerland) Martina Hingis / (India) Sania Mirza (champions)
2. (Chinese Taipei) Chan Hao-ching / (Chinese Taipei) Chan Yung-jan (first round)
3. (Russia) Anastasia Pavlyuchenkova / (Russia) Elena Vesnina (quarterfinals)
4. (Slovenia) Andreja Klepač / (Russia) Alla Kudryavtseva (semifinals)

== Draw ==
Key

- Q = Qualifier
- WC = Wild card
- LL = Lucky loser
- Alt = Alternate
- ITF = ITF entry
- PR = Protected ranking
- SR = Special ranking
- SE = Special exempt
- JE = Junior exempt
- JR = Junior Accelerator Programme entrant
- CO = College Accelerator Programme entrant
- NG = Next Gen Accelerator Program entrant
- w/o = Walkover
- r = Retired
- d = Defaulted

First round
1	(Switzerland) M Hingis (India) S Mirza	6	6
Alt	(Israel) S Pe'er (United States) M Sanchez	1	2
(Switzerland) B Bencic (France) K Mladenovic	6	6
(Italy) S Errani (Spain) C Suárez Navarro	1	2
4	(Slovenia) A Klepač (Russia) A Kudryavtseva	6	6
(Belgium) Y Bonaventure (Romania) R Olaru	2	3
(Canada) G Dabrowski (Poland) A Rosolska	6	7^{8}
(Australia) An Rodionova (Australia) Ar Rodionova	3	6^{6}
(Slovakia) J Husárová (Spain) MJ Martínez Sánchez	4	3
(Spain) A Medina Garrigues (Spain) A Parra Santonja	6	6
(Russia) M Gasparyan (Russia) A Panova	3	0
3	(Russia) A Pavlyuchenkova (Russia) E Vesnina	6	6
WC	(Germany) A Kerber (Germany) A Petkovic	7^{7}	6
(Ukraine) K Bondarenko (Ukraine) O Savchuk	6^{2}	3
(United States) R Atawo (France) A Cornet	7^{7}	3	[10]
2	(Chinese Taipei) H-c Chan (Chinese Taipei) Y-j Chan	6^{3}	6	[5]

Quarterfinals
1	(Switzerland) M Hingis (India) S Mirza	6	4	[10]
(Switzerland) B Bencic (France) K Mladenovic	3	6	[6]
4	(Slovenia) A Klepač (Russia) A Kudryavtseva	7^{7}	6
(Canada) G Dabrowski (Poland) A Rosolska	6^{5}	0
(Spain) A Medina Garrigues (Spain) A Parra Santonja	2	7^{10}	[10]
3	(Russia) A Pavlyuchenkova (Russia) E Vesnina	6	6^{8}	[7]
WC	(Germany) A Kerber (Germany) A Petkovic	6	6
(United States) R Atawo (France) A Cornet	2	3

Semifinals
1	(Switzerland) M Hingis (India) S Mirza	6	7
4	(Slovenia) A Klepač (Russia) A Kudryavtseva	3	5
(Spain) A Medina Garrigues (Spain) A Parra Santonja	6	3	[2]
WC	(Germany) A Kerber (Germany) A Petkovic	2	6	[10]

Final
1	(Switzerland) M Hingis (India) S Mirza	7	6
WC	(Germany) A Kerber (Germany) A Petkovic	5	1
