= 2016 Brisbane International =

Coordinates: 27°31′30″S 153°0′26″E

- Date: 3–10 January 2016
- Edition: 8th
- Prize money: $461,330 (men) $1,000,000 (women)
- Surface: Hard / outdoor
- Location: Tennyson, Brisbane, Queensland, Australia
- Venue: Queensland Tennis Centre

Champions

Men's singles
- (Canada) Milos Raonic

Women's singles
- (Belarus) Victoria Azarenka

Men's doubles
- (Finland) Henri Kontinen / (Australia) John Peers

Women's doubles
- (Switzerland) Martina Hingis / (India) Sania Mirza
- Brisbane International

The 2016 Brisbane International was a tennis tournament of the 2016 ATP World Tour and 2016 WTA Tour. It was played on outdoor hard courts in Brisbane, Queensland, Australia. It was the eighth edition of the tournament and took place at the Queensland Tennis Centre in Tennyson. It was held from 3 to 10 January 2016 as part of the Australian Open Series in preparation for the first Grand Slam of the year.

== Finals ==
=== Men's singles ===
- (Canada) Milos Raonic defeated (Switzerland) Roger Federer, 6–4, 6–4

=== Women's singles ===
- (Belarus) Victoria Azarenka defeated (Germany) Angelique Kerber 6–3, 6–1

=== Men's doubles ===
- (Finland) Henri Kontinen / (Australia) John Peers defeated (Australia) James Duckworth / (Australia) Chris Guccione, 7–6^{(7–4)}, 6–1

=== Women's doubles ===
- (Switzerland) Martina Hingis / (India) Sania Mirza defeated (Germany) Angelique Kerber / (Germany) Andrea Petkovic, 7–5, 6–1

== Points and prize money ==
=== Point distribution ===
Event	W	F	SF	QF	Round of 16	Round of 32	Q	Q3	Q2	Q1
Men's singles	250	150	90	45	20	0	12	6	0	0
Men's doubles	250	150	90	45	0	—N/a	—N/a	—N/a	—N/a	—N/a
Women's singles	470	305	185	100	55	1	25	18	13	1
Women's doubles	470	305	185	100	1	—N/a	—N/a	—N/a	—N/a	—N/a

=== Prize money ===
Event	W	F	SF	QF	Round of 16	Round of 32^{1}	Q3	Q2	Q1
Men's singles	$72,000	$37,900	$20,545	$11,705	$6,900	$4,085	$1,840	$920	—N/a
Men's doubles *	$21,850	$11,500	$6,230	$3,570	$2,090	—N/a	—N/a	—N/a	—N/a
Women's singles	$193,210	$103,850	$55,306	$22,483	$12,077	$6,587	$3,435	$1,830	$1,025
Women's doubles *	$45,990	$24,518	$13,419	$6,830	$3,702	—N/a	—N/a	—N/a	—N/a

_{^{1}Qualifiers prize money is also the Round of 32 prize money.}
_{*per team}

== ATP singles main-draw entrants ==
=== Seeds ===
Country	Player	Rank^{1}	Seed
SUI	Roger Federer	3	1
JPN	Kei Nishikori	8	2
CRO	Marin Čilić	13	3
CAN	Milos Raonic	14	4
FRA	Gilles Simon	15	5
BEL	David Goffin	16	6
AUS	Bernard Tomic	18	7
AUT	Dominic Thiem	20	8

- ^{1} Rankings as of 28 December 2015.

=== Other entrants ===
The following players received wildcards into the singles main draw:

- (Australia) Ben Mitchell
- (Australia) James Duckworth
- (Australia) John-Patrick Smith

The following player received entry using a protected ranking into the singles main draw:

- (Czech Republic) Radek Štěpánek

The following players received entry from the qualifying draw:

- (Australia) Oliver Anderson
- (Croatia) Ivan Dodig
- (Germany) Tobias Kamke
- (Japan) Yoshihito Nishioka

=== Withdrawals ===
Before the tournament

- (Poland) Jerzy Janowicz → replaced by (Serbia) Dušan Lajović
- (United States) Sam Querrey → replaced by (France) Lucas Pouille

== ATP doubles main-draw entrants ==
=== Seeds ===
Country	Player	Country	Player	Rank^{1}	Seed
FRA	Pierre-Hugues Herbert	FRA	Nicolas Mahut	26	1
FIN	Henri Kontinen	AUS	John Peers	39	2
POL	Łukasz Kubot	POL	Marcin Matkowski	45	3
GBR	Dominic Inglot	SWE	Robert Lindstedt	49	4

- ^{1} Rankings as of 28 December 2015.

=== Other entrants ===
The following pairs received wildcards into the doubles main draw:

- (Australia) James Duckworth / (Australia) Chris Guccione
- (Australia) Matt Reid / (Australia) John-Patrick Smith

=== Withdrawals ===
During the tournament

- (Bulgaria) Grigor Dimitrov (shoulder soreness)

== WTA singles main-draw entrants ==
=== Seeds ===
Country	Player	Rank^{1}	Seed
~~ROU~~	~~Simona Halep~~	~~2~~	~~1~~
ESP	Garbiñe Muguruza	3	2
~~RUS~~	~~Maria Sharapova~~	~~4~~	~~3~~
GER	Angelique Kerber	10	4
SUI	Timea Bacsinszky	12	5
ESP	Carla Suárez Navarro	13	6
SUI	Belinda Bencic	14	7
ITA	Roberta Vinci	15	8

- ^{1} Rankings as of 28 December 2015.

=== Other entrants ===
The following players received wildcards into the singles main draw:

- (Australia) Priscilla Hon
- (Croatia) Ajla Tomljanović

The following players received entry from the qualifying draw:

- (Ukraine) Kateryna Bondarenko
- (Slovakia) Jana Čepelová
- (United States) Samantha Crawford
- (Russia) Elena Vesnina

The following players received entry as lucky losers:

- (Belgium) Ysaline Bonaventure
- (Russia) Margarita Gasparyan

=== Withdrawals ===
Before the tournament

- (Romania) Simona Halep (Left leg injury) → replaced by (Belgium) Ysaline Bonaventure
- (Russia) Maria Sharapova (Left forearm injury) → replaced by (Russia) Margarita Gasparyan

=== Retirements ===
- (Spain) Garbiñe Muguruza (Left foot injury)

== WTA doubles main-draw entrants ==
=== Seeds ===
Country	Player	Country	Player	Rank^{1}	Seed
SUI	Martina Hingis	IND	Sania Mirza	3	1
TPE	Chan Hao-ching	TPE	Chan Yung-jan	19	2
RUS	Anastasia Pavlyuchenkova	RUS	Elena Vesnina	35	3
SLO	Andreja Klepač	RUS	Alla Kudryavtseva	54	4

- ^{1} Rankings as of 28 December 2015.

=== Other entrants ===
The following pairs received wildcards into the doubles main draw:

- (Australia) Priscilla Hon / (Croatia) Ajla Tomljanović
- (Germany) Angelique Kerber / (Germany) Andrea Petkovic

The following pair received entry as alternates:

- (Israel) Shahar Pe'er / (United States) Maria Sanchez

=== Withdrawals ===
Before the tournament

- (Croatia) Ajla Tomljanović (abdominal injury)

== Broadcast ==
Selected matches aired in Australia on 7Two, with live coverage of both day and night sessions. Every match was also available to be streamed live through a free 7Tennis mobile app.
