= 2016 Brisbane International – Women's singles =

Coordinates: 27°31′30″S 153°0′26″E

Women's singles
- 2016 Brisbane International

Final
- Champion: (Belarus) Victoria Azarenka
- Runner-up: (Germany) Angelique Kerber
- Score: 6–3, 6–1

Details
- Draw: 30
- Seeds: 8

Events
Singles	men	women
Doubles	men	women
- Brisbane International

Maria Sharapova was the defending champion, but withdrew before her first match due to a forearm injury.

Unseeded Victoria Azarenka won her first title in almost three years, beating Angelique Kerber in the final, 6–3, 6–1.

== Seeds ==
The top two seeds receive a bye into the second round.

1. (Romania) Simona Halep (withdrew due to a leg injury)
2. (Spain) Garbiñe Muguruza (second round, retired due to a left foot injury)
3. (Russia) Maria Sharapova (withdrew due to a wrist injury)
4. (Germany) Angelique Kerber (final)
5. (Switzerland) Timea Bacsinszky (first round)
6. (Spain) Carla Suárez Navarro (semifinals)
7. (Switzerland) Belinda Bencic (second round)
8. (Italy) Roberta Vinci (quarterfinals)

== Draw ==
Key

- Q = Qualifier
- WC = Wild card
- LL = Lucky loser
- Alt = Alternate
- ITF = ITF entry
- PR = Protected ranking
- SR = Special ranking
- SE = Special exempt
- JE = Junior exempt
- JR = Junior Accelerator Programme entrant
- CO = College Accelerator Programme entrant
- NG = Next Gen Accelerator Program entrant
- w/o = Walkover
- r = Retired
- d = Defaulted

=== Finals ===
Semifinals
(Belarus) Victoria Azarenka	6	6
Q	(United States) Samantha Crawford	0	3
4	(Germany) Angelique Kerber	6	6
6	(Spain) Carla Suárez Navarro	2	3

Final
(Belarus) Victoria Azarenka	6	6
4	(Germany) Angelique Kerber	3	1

=== Top half ===
First round
Q	(Russia) E Vesnina	2	0
(Belarus) V Azarenka	6	6
(Belgium) Y Wickmayer	6	4	4
(Slovakia) D Cibulková	3	6	6
(Serbia) J Janković	6	2	4
8	(Italy) R Vinci	3	6	6
LL	(Russia) M Gasparyan	4	6	3
(Russia) E Makarova	6	2	6
(Brazil) T Pereira	1	2
(Germany) A Petkovic	6	6
Q	(United States) S Crawford	6	6
WC	(Australia) P Hon	4	4
(Italy) S Errani	1	2
7	(Switzerland) B Bencic	6	6

Second round
LL	(Belgium) Y Bonaventure	3	2
(Belarus) V Azarenka	6	6
(Slovakia) D Cibulková	1	1
8	(Italy) R Vinci	6	6
(Russia) E Makarova	5	4
(Germany) A Petkovic	7	6
Q	(United States) S Crawford	7	7
7	(Switzerland) B Bencic	5	5

Quarterfinals
(Belarus) V Azarenka	6	6
8	(Italy) R Vinci	1	2
(Germany) A Petkovic	3	0
Q	(United States) S Crawford	6	6

Semifinals
(Belarus) V Azarenka	6	6
Q	(United States) S Crawford	0	3

=== Bottom half ===
First round
5	(Switzerland) T Bacsinszky	2	1
(Russia) A Pavlyuchenkova	6	6
(France) A Cornet	6	6
(France) K Mladenovic	3	4
Q	(Ukraine) K Bondarenko	4	6	4
(United States) M Brengle	6	4	6
(Italy) C Giorgi	7	3	0
4	(Germany) A Kerber	5	6	6
6	(Spain) C Suárez Navarro	6	6
WC	(Croatia) A Tomljanović	1	2
Q	(Slovakia) J Čepelová	4	6	4
(Australia) S Stosur	6	3	6
(United States) V Lepchenko	6	6
(Slovakia) AK Schmiedlová	2	1

Second round
(Russia) A Pavlyuchenkova	6	1	6
(France) A Cornet	2	6	4
(United States) M Brengle	3	0
4	(Germany) A Kerber	6	6
6	(Spain) C Suárez Navarro	6	6^{3}	6
(Australia) S Stosur	1	7^{7}	4
(United States) V Lepchenko	7^{11}	1
2	(Spain) G Muguruza	6^{9}	0^{r}

Quarterfinals
(Russia) A Pavlyuchenkova	4	4
4	(Germany) A Kerber	6	6
6	(Spain) C Suárez Navarro	4	6	7
(United States) V Lepchenko	6	4	5

Semifinals
4	(Germany) A Kerber	6	6
6	(Spain) C Suárez Navarro	2	3

== Qualifying ==
=== Seeds ===
1. (Bulgaria) Tsvetana Pironkova (first round)
2. (Russia) Margarita Gasparyan (qualifying competition, lucky loser)
3. (Slovakia) Daniela Hantuchová (first round)
4. (Ukraine) Kateryna Bondarenko (qualified)
5. (Belarus) Aliaksandra Sasnovich (first round)
6. (Bulgaria) Sesil Karatantcheva (first round)
7. (Russia) Elena Vesnina (qualified)
8. (France) Pauline Parmentier (first round)

=== Qualifiers ===
1. (United States) Samantha Crawford
2. (Slovakia) Jana Čepelová
3. (Russia) Elena Vesnina
4. (Ukraine) Kateryna Bondarenko

=== Lucky losers ===
1. (Russia) Margarita Gasparyan
2. (Belgium) Ysaline Bonaventure

=== Qualifying draw ===
==== First qualifier ====
First round
1	(Bulgaria) Tsvetana Pironkova	6^{1}	4
(United States) Samantha Crawford	7^{7}	6
WC	(Australia) Kimberly Birrell	6^{4}	6	6
(China) Han Xinyun	7^{7}	1	4
WC	(Australia) Sara Tomic	2	7	3
(France) Océane Dodin	6	5	6
(Ukraine) Olga Savchuk	6	6
6	(Bulgaria) Sesil Karatantcheva	1	2

Second round
(United States) Samantha Crawford	6	6
WC	(Australia) Kimberly Birrell	3	4
(France) Océane Dodin	7	6
(Ukraine) Olga Savchuk	5	1

Qualifying competition
(United States) Samantha Crawford	6	4	6
(France) Océane Dodin	4	6	3

==== Second qualifier ====
First round
2	(Russia) Margarita Gasparyan	6	6
(Spain) Sara Sorribes Tormo	1	3
(Croatia) Jana Fett	7	6
(Russia) Alexandra Panova	5	4
(Israel) Shahar Pe'er	1	1
(Slovakia) Jana Čepelová	6	6
(Slovakia) Kristína Kučová	6	6
5	(Belarus) Aliaksandra Sasnovich	3	4

Second round
2	(Russia) Margarita Gasparyan	7^{7}	6
(Croatia) Jana Fett	6^{3}	2
(Slovakia) Jana Čepelová	6	6
(Slovakia) Kristína Kučová	2	3

Qualifying competition
2	(Russia) Margarita Gasparyan	1	4
(Slovakia) Jana Čepelová	6	6

==== Third qualifier ====
First round
3	(Slovakia) Daniela Hantuchová	1	6	2
(Belgium) Ysaline Bonaventure	6	4	6
(Spain) Laura Pous Tió	6	6
Alt	(Poland) Katarzyna Piter	3	1
(France) Mathilde Johansson	6	6
(United States) Maria Sanchez	1	3
WC	(Australia) Tammi Patterson	2	2
7	(Russia) Elena Vesnina	6	6

Second round
(Belgium) Ysaline Bonaventure	3	6	6
(Spain) Laura Pous Tió	6	4	0
(France) Mathilde Johansson	4	6	4
7	(Russia) Elena Vesnina	6	4	6

Qualifying competition
(Belgium) Ysaline Bonaventure	5	5
7	(Russia) Elena Vesnina	7	7

==== Fourth qualifier ====
First round
4	(Ukraine) Kateryna Bondarenko	6	3	7^{7}
(Greece) Maria Sakkari	3	6	6^{5}
(France) Virginie Razzano	4	7^{7}	1
(Estonia) Kaia Kanepi	6	6^{4}	6
(France) Alizé Lim	7^{12}	6
WC	(Australia) Naiktha Bains	6^{10}	4
(Japan) Naomi Osaka	6	6
8	(France) Pauline Parmentier	3	3

Second round
4	(Ukraine) Kateryna Bondarenko	7	2
(Estonia) Kaia Kanepi	5	2^{r}
(France) Alizé Lim	1	2
(Japan) Naomi Osaka	6	6

Qualifying competition
4	(Ukraine) Kateryna Bondarenko	7^{9}	4	6
(Japan) Naomi Osaka	6^{7}	6	4
