= Andrey Rublev career statistics =

Career finals
Discipline	Type	Won	Lost	Total
Singles
Singles	Grand Slam	–	–	–
Singles	ATP Finals	–	–	–
Singles	ATP 1000	2	4	6
Singles	ATP 500	6	6	12
Singles	ATP 250	10	3	13
Singles	Olympics	–	–	–
Singles	Total	18	13	31
Doubles
Doubles	Grand Slam	–	–	–
Doubles	ATP Finals	–	–	–
Doubles	ATP 1000	1	3	4
Doubles	ATP 500	–	–	–
Doubles	ATP 250	3	1	4
Doubles	Olympics	–	–	–
Doubles	Total	4	4	8
Mixed
Mixed	Grand Slam	–	–	–
Mixed	Olympics	1	0	1
Mixed	Total	1	0	1

This is a list of main career statistics of Russian professional tennis player Andrey Rublev. All statistics are according to the ATP World Tour and ITF websites.

== Performance timelines ==
Key
W	F	SF	QF	#R	RR	Q#	P#	DNQ	A	Z#	PO	G	S	B	NMS	NTI	P	NH

(W) winner; (F) finalist; (SF) semifinalist; (QF) quarterfinalist; (#R) rounds 4, 3, 2, 1; (RR) round-robin stage; (Q#) qualification round; (P#) preliminary round; (DNQ) did not qualify; (A) absent; (Z#) Davis/Fed Cup Zonal Group (with number indication) or (PO) play-off; (G) gold, (S) silver or (B) bronze Olympic/Paralympic medal; (NMS) not a Masters tournament; (NTI) not a Tier I tournament; (P) postponed; (NH) not held; (SR) strike rate (events won / competed); (W–L) win–loss record.
To avoid confusion and double counting, these charts are updated at the conclusion of a tournament or when the player's participation has ended.

=== Singles ===
Tournament	2014	2015	2016	2017	2018	2019	2020	2021	2022	2023	2024	2025	2026	SR	W–L	Win%
Grand Slam tournaments
Australian Open	A	A	A	2R	3R	1R	4R	QF	3R	QF	QF	1R	3R	0 / 10	22–10	69%
French Open	A	A	Q2	1R	A	A	QF	1R	QF	3R	3R	4R (Note: Rublev received a walkover in the third round of the 2025 French Open against Arthur Fils, which does not officially count as a win.)	4R	0 / 8	17–8	68%
Wimbledon	A	Q2	Q2	2R	A	2R	NH	4R	A (Note: Russian athletes were banned from competing following the 2022 Russian invasion of Ukraine.)	QF	1R	4R	1R	0 / 7	12–7	63%
US Open	A	1R	Q1	QF	1R	4R	QF	3R	QF	QF	4R	4R	2R	0 / 11	28–11	72%
Win–loss	0–0	0–1	0–0	6–4	2–2	4–3	11–3	9–4	10–3	14–4	9–4	8–4	6–4	0 / 36	79–36	69%
Year-end championships
ATP Finals	did not qualify						RR	RR	SF	RR	RR	DNQ		0 / 5	4–12	25%
National representation
Summer Olympics	NH		A	not held				1R	NH		A	NH		0 / 1	0–1	0%
Davis Cup	Z1	PO	PO	PO	Z1	SF	NH	W	A					1 / 2	12–5	71%
ATP 1000 tournaments
Indian Wells Open	A	A	Q2	Q1	2R	3R	NH	3R	SF	4R	3R	2R	2R	0 / 8	9–8	53%
Miami Open	A	2R	1R	2R	2R	3R	NH	SF	2R	4R	2R	2R	2R	0 / 11	10–11	48%
Monte-Carlo Masters	A	A	1R	Q1	2R	1R	NH	F	3R	W	2R	3R	2R	1 / 9	13–8	62%
Madrid Open	A	A	A	A	A	A	NH	3R	QF	4R	W	3R	2R	1 / 6	11–5	69%
Italian Open	A	Q2	A	A	A	A	2R	QF	2R	4R	3R	2R	QF	0 / 7	9–7	56%
Canadian Open	A	A	A	A	1R	Q1	NH	3R	2R	2R	F	QF	2R	0 / 7	8–7	53%
Cincinnati Open	A	A	A	Q1	1R	QF	1R	F	3R	2R	QF	QF	3R	0 / 9	14–9	61%
Shanghai Masters	A	A	A	2R	1R	3R	NH			F	2R	2R	2R	0 / 7	8–7	53%
Paris Masters	A	A	A	1R	A	1R	3R	2R	3R	SF	2R	3R	1R	0 / 9	7–9	44%
Win–loss	0–0	1–1	0–2	2–3	1–6	8–6	2–3	17–8	9–8	21–8	14–8	9–9	5–9	2 / 73	89–71	56%
Career statistics
	2014	2015	2016	2017	2018	2019	2020	2021	2022	2023	2024	2025	2026	SR	W–L	Win%
Tournaments	1	11	5	17	21	20	14	22	23	25	27	26	21	Total: 233		
Titles	0	0	0	1	0	1	5	1	4	2	2	1	1	Total: 18		
Finals	0	0	0	1	1	2	5	4	4	6	3	2	3	Total: 31		
Hard win–loss	1–1	5–8	3–3	13–13	18–20	32–15	31–8	37–16	37–13	29–19	32–18	22–17	17–12	11 / 161	277–163	63%
Clay win–loss	0–0	3–5	0–2	5–3	2–3	5–3	10–2	9–5	14–6	19–5	11–6	8–6	16–6	7 / 57	102–52	66%
Grass win–loss	0–0	0–0	0–0	3–2	0–0	1–1	0–0	7–2	0–1	8–2	0–2	4–2	0–2	0 / 14	23–14	62%
Overall win–loss	1–1	8–13	3–5	21–18	20–23	38–19	41–10	53–23	51–20	56–26	43–26	34–25	33–20	18 / 233	402–229	64%
Win %	50%	38%	38%	54%	47%	67%	80%	70%	72%	68%	62%	58%	62%	64%		
Year-end ranking	437	185	156	39	68	23	8	5	8	5	8	16		$34,399,267		

=== Doubles ===
Tournament	2014	2015	2016	2017	2018	2019	2020	2021	2022	2023	2024	2025	2026	SR	W–L
Grand Slam tournaments
Australian Open	A	A	A	A	1R	2R	1R	A	A	A	A	A	A	0 / 3	1–3
French Open	A	A	A	A	A	A	A	A	A	A	A	A	A	0 / 0	0–0
Wimbledon	A	A	A	A	A	A	NH	A	A	A	A	A	A	0 / 0	0–0
US Open	A	A	A	3R	A	1R	A	A	A	A	A	A		0 / 2	2–2
Win–loss	0–0	0–0	0–0	2–1	0–1	1–2	0–1	0–0	0–0	0–0	0–0	0–0	0–0	0 / 5	3–5
National representation
Olympics	not held		A	not held				1R	not held		A	not held		0 / 1	0–1
Davis Cup	Z1	PO	PO	PO	Z1	SF	W		A					1 / 2	8–5
ATP 1000 tournaments
Indian Wells Open	A	A	A	A	A	A	NH	F	QF	1R	1R	1R	QF	0 / 6	8–6
Miami Open	A	A	A	1R	F	A	NH	2R	2R	A	A	A	A	0 / 4	6–2
Monte-Carlo Masters	A	A	A	A	1R	A	NH	2R	1R	2R	2R	2R	1R	0 / 7	4–6
Madrid Open	A	A	A	A	A	A	NH	2R	2R	W	A	A	A	1 / 3	7–2
Italian Open	A	A	A	A	A	A	1R	A	A	2R	A	A	A	0 / 2	1–1
Canadian Open	A	A	A	A	A	QF	NH	2R	2R	QF	1R	1R	1R	0 / 7	6–7
Cincinnati Open	A	A	A	A	A	A	1R	2R	2R	2R	1R	A	1R	0 / 6	3–6
Shanghai Masters	A	A	A	A	A	1R	NH			2R	2R	2R		0 / 4	2–2
Paris Masters	A	A	A	1R	A	F	A	A	1R	2R	A	A		0 / 4	4–4
Win–loss	0–0	0–0	0–0	0–2	4–2	6–3	0–2	9–5	6–6	10–6	2–4	2–2	2–4	1 / 43	41–36
Career statistics
	2014	2015	2016	2017	2018	2019	2020	2021	2022	2023	2024	2025	2026	Career	
Tournaments	1	2	1	6	9	10	8	12	12	14	8	8	6	97	
Titles	0	1	0	0	0	0	0	1	1	1	0	0	0	Career total: 4	
Finals	0	1	0	0	1	1	0	2	1	1	0	2	1	Career total: 10	
Overall win–loss	3–1	5–1	3–1	2–6	5–10	11–13	2–8	20–11	11–9	14–14	4–6	7–6	5–6	92–92	
Win %	75%	83%	75%	25%	33%	46%	20%	65%	55%	50%	40%	54%	45%	50%	
Year-end ranking	446	129	419	316	127	75	81	74	115	46	334	178			

== Significant finals ==
=== ATP Masters 1000 tournaments ===
==== Singles: 6 (2 titles, 4 runner-ups) ====
Result	Year	Tournament	Surface	Opponent	Score
Loss	2021	Monte-Carlo Masters	Clay	(Greece) Stefanos Tsitsipas	3–6, 3–6
Loss	2021	Cincinnati Open	Hard	(Germany) Alexander Zverev	2–6, 3–6
Win	2023	Monte-Carlo Masters	Clay	(Denmark) Holger Rune	5–7, 6–2, 7–5
Loss	2023	Shanghai Masters	Hard	(Poland) Hubert Hurkacz	3–6, 6–3, 6–7^{(8–10)}
Win	2024	Madrid Open	Clay	(Canada) Félix Auger-Aliassime	4–6, 7–5, 7–5
Loss	2024	Canadian Open	Hard	(Australia) Alexei Popyrin	2–6, 4–6

==== Doubles: 4 (1 title, 3 runner-ups) ====
Result	Year	Tournament	Surface	Partner	Opponents	Score
Loss	2018	Miami Open	Hard	(Russia) Karen Khachanov	(United States) Bob Bryan (United States) Mike Bryan	6–4, 6–7^{(5–7)}, [4–10]
Loss	2019	Paris Masters	Hard (i)	(Russia) Karen Khachanov	(France) Pierre-Hugues Herbert (France) Nicolas Mahut	4–6, 1–6
Loss	2021	Indian Wells	Hard	(Russia) Aslan Karatsev	(Australia) John Peers (Slovakia) Filip Polášek	3–6, 6–7^{(5–7)}
Win	2023	Madrid Open	Clay	Karen Khachanov	(India) Rohan Bopanna (Australia) Matthew Ebden	6–3, 3–6, [10–3]

=== Summer Olympics ===
==== Mixed doubles: 1 (gold medal) ====
Result	Year	Tournament	Surface	Partner	Opponents	Score
Gold	2021	Tokyo Summer Olympics	Hard	(Russia) Anastasia Pavlyuchenkova	(Russia) Elena Vesnina (Russia) Aslan Karatsev	6–3, 6–7^{(5–7)}, [13–11]

== ATP Tour finals ==
=== Singles: 31 (18 titles, 13 runner-ups) ===
Legend Grand Slam (–) ATP Finals (–) ATP 1000 (2–4) ATP 500 (6–6) ATP 250 (10–3)	Finals by surface Hard (11–6) Clay (7–5) Grass (0–2)	Finals by setting Outdoor (12–13) Indoor (6–0)

Result	W–L	Date	Tournament	Tier	Surface	Opponent	Score
Win	1–0	Jul 2017	Croatia Open, Croatia	ATP 250	Clay	(Italy) Paolo Lorenzi	6–4, 6–2
Loss	1–1	Jan 2018	Qatar Open, Qatar	ATP 250	Hard	(France) Gaël Monfils	2–6, 3–6
Loss	1–2	Jul 2019	Hamburg European Open, Germany	ATP 500	Clay	(Georgia (country)) Nikoloz Basilashvili	5–7, 6–4, 3–6
Win	2–2	Oct 2019	Kremlin Cup, Russia	ATP 250	Hard (i)	(France) Adrian Mannarino	6–4, 6–0
Win	3–2	Jan 2020	Qatar Open, Qatar	ATP 250	Hard	(France) Corentin Moutet	6–2, 7–6^{(7–3)}
Win	4–2	Jan 2020	Adelaide International, Australia	ATP 250	Hard	(South Africa) Lloyd Harris	6–3, 6–0
Win	5–2	Sep 2020	Hamburg European Open, Germany	ATP 500	Clay	(Greece) Stefanos Tsitsipas	6–4, 3–6, 7–5
Win	6–2	Oct 2020	St. Petersburg Open, Russia	ATP 500	Hard (i)	(Croatia) Borna Ćorić	7–6^{(7–5)}, 6–4
Win	7–2	Oct 2020	Vienna Open, Austria	ATP 500	Hard (i)	(Italy) Lorenzo Sonego	6–4, 6–4
Win	8–2	Mar 2021	Rotterdam Open, Netherlands	ATP 500	Hard (i)	(Hungary) Márton Fucsovics	7–6^{(7–4)}, 6–4
Loss	8–3	Apr 2021	Monte-Carlo Masters, France	ATP 1000	Clay	(Greece) Stefanos Tsitsipas	3–6, 3–6
Loss	8–4	Jun 2021	Halle Open, Germany	ATP 500	Grass	(France) Ugo Humbert	3–6, 6–7^{(4–7)}
Loss	8–5	Aug 2021	Cincinnati Open, United States	ATP 1000	Hard	(Germany) Alexander Zverev	2–6, 3–6
Win	9–5	Feb 2022	Open 13, France	ATP 250	Hard (i)	(Canada) Félix Auger-Aliassime	7–5, 7–6^{(7–4)}
Win	10–5	Feb 2022	Dubai Tennis Championships, UAE	ATP 500	Hard	(Czech Republic) Jiří Veselý	6–3, 6–4
Win	11–5	Apr 2022	Serbia Open, Serbia	ATP 250	Clay	(Serbia) Novak Djokovic	6–2, 6–7^{(4–7)}, 6–0
Win	12–5	Oct 2022	Gijón Open, Spain	ATP 250	Hard (i)	(United States) Sebastian Korda	6–2, 6–3
Loss	12–6	Feb 2023	Dubai Tennis Championships, UAE	ATP 500	Hard	Daniil Medvedev	2–6, 2–6
Win	13–6	Apr 2023	Monte-Carlo Masters, France	ATP 1000	Clay	(Denmark) Holger Rune	5–7, 6–2, 7–5
Loss	13–7	Apr 2023	Banja Luka Open, Bosnia and Herzegovina	ATP 250	Clay	(Serbia) Dušan Lajović	3–6, 6–4, 4–6
Loss	13–8	Jun 2023	Halle Open, Germany	ATP 500	Grass	(Kazakhstan) Alexander Bublik	3–6, 6–3, 3–6
Win	14–8	Jul 2023	Swedish Open, Sweden	ATP 250	Clay	(Norway) Casper Ruud	7–6^{(7–3)}, 6–0
Loss	14–9	Oct 2023	Shanghai Masters, China	ATP 1000	Hard	(Poland) Hubert Hurkacz	3–6, 6–3, 6–7^{(8–10)}
Win	15–9	Jan 2024	Hong Kong Open, China SAR	ATP 250	Hard	(Finland) Emil Ruusuvuori	6–4, 6–4
Win	16–9	May 2024	Madrid Open, Spain	ATP 1000	Clay	(Canada) Félix Auger-Aliassime	4–6, 7–5, 7–5
Loss	16–10	Aug 2024	Canadian Open, Canada	ATP 1000	Hard	(Australia) Alexei Popyrin	2–6, 4–6
Win	17–10	Feb 2025	Qatar Open, Qatar (2)	ATP 500	Hard	(United Kingdom) Jack Draper	7–5, 5–7, 6–1
Loss	17–11	May 2025	Hamburg Open, Germany	ATP 500	Clay	(Italy) Flavio Cobolli	2–6, 4–6
Loss	17–12	Apr 2026	Barcelona Open, Spain	ATP 500	Clay	(France) Arthur Fils	2–6, 6–7^{(2–7)}
Win	18–12	Jul 2026	Swedish Open, Sweden (2)	ATP 250	Clay	(Italy) Luciano Darderi	6–4, 6–3
Loss	18–13	Sep 2026	Hangzhou Open, China	ATP 250	Hard	Daniil Medvedev	5–7, 4–6

=== Doubles: 10 (4 titles, 6 runner-ups) ===
Legend Grand Slam (–) ATP 1000 (1–3) ATP 500 (0–1) ATP 250 (3–2)	Finals by surface Hard (3–6) Clay (1–0) Grass (–)	Finals by setting Outdoor (2–4) Indoor (2–2)

Result	W–L	Date	Tournament	Tier	Surface	Partner	Opponents	Score
Win	1–0	Oct 2015	Kremlin Cup, Russia	ATP 250	Hard (i)	(Russia) Dmitry Tursunov	(Moldova) Radu Albot (Czech Republic) František Čermák	2–6, 6–1, [10–6]
Loss	1–1	Mar 2018	Miami Open, United States	ATP 1000	Hard	(Russia) Karen Khachanov	(United States) Bob Bryan (United States) Mike Bryan	6–4, 6–7^{(5–7)}, [4–10]
Loss	1–2	Nov 2019	Paris Masters, France	ATP 1000	Hard (i)	(Russia) Karen Khachanov	(France) Pierre-Hugues Herbert (France) Nicolas Mahut	4–6, 1–6
Win	2–2	Mar 2021	Qatar Open, Qatar	ATP 250	Hard	(Russia) Aslan Karatsev	(New Zealand) Marcus Daniell (Austria) Philipp Oswald	7–5, 6–4
Loss	2–3	Oct 2021	Indian Wells Open, United States	ATP 1000	Hard	(Russia) Aslan Karatsev	(Australia) John Peers (Slovakia) Filip Polášek	3–6, 6–7^{(5–7)}
Win	3–3	Feb 2022	Open 13, France	ATP 250	Hard (i)	(Ukraine) Denys Molchanov	(South Africa) Raven Klaasen (Japan) Ben McLachlan	4–6, 7–5, [10–7]
Win	4–3	May 2023	Madrid Open, Spain	ATP 1000	Clay	Karen Khachanov	(India) Rohan Bopanna (Australia) Matthew Ebden	6–3, 3–6, [10–3]
Loss	4–4	Jan 2025	Hong Kong Open, China SAR	ATP 250	Hard	Karen Khachanov	(Netherlands) Sander Arends (United Kingdom) Luke Johnson	5–7, 6–4, [7–10]
Loss	4–5	Sep 2025	China Open, China	ATP 500	Hard	Karen Khachanov	(Finland) Harri Heliövaara (United Kingdom) Henry Patten	6–4, 3–6, [8–10]
Loss	4–6	Jan 2026	Hong Kong Open, China SAR	ATP 250	Hard	Karen Khachanov	(Italy) Lorenzo Musetti (Italy) Lorenzo Sonego	4–6, 6–2, [1–10]

== ATP Next Generation finals ==
=== Singles: 1 (runner-up) ===
Result	Date	Tournament	Surface	Opponent	Score
Loss	Nov 2017	Next Generation ATP Finals, Italy	Hard (i)	(South Korea) Chung Hyeon	4–3^{(7–5)}, 3–4^{(2–7)}, 2–4, 2–4

== ATP Challenger and ITF Tour finals ==
=== Singles: 10 (5 titles, 5 runner-ups) ===
Legend ATP Challenger Tour (1–3) ITF Futures (4–2)	Finals by surface Hard (3–4) Clay (2–0) Carpet (0–1)

Result	W–L	Date	Tournament	Tier	Surface	Opponent	Score
Win	1–0	Mar 2016	Open de Bretagne, France	Challenger	Hard (i)	(France) Paul-Henri Mathieu	6–7^{(6–8)}, 6–4, 6–4
Loss	1–1	Nov 2016	Internationaux de Vendée, France	Challenger	Hard (i)	(France) Julien Benneteau	5–7, 6–2, 3–6
Loss	1–2	Jan 2017	Open de Rennes, France	Challenger	Hard (i)	(Belarus) Uladzimir Ignatik	7–6^{(8–6)}, 3–6, 6–7^{(5–7)}
Loss	1–3	Mar 2019	Indian Wells Challenger, US	Challenger	Hard	(United Kingdom) Kyle Edmund	3–6, 2–6
Loss	0–1	Aug 2013	F1 Minsk, Belarus	Futures	Hard	(Belarus) Egor Gerasimov	6–7^{(2–7)}, 6–4, 4–6
Win	1–1	Nov 2013	F31 Bradenton, US	Futures	Clay	(Latvia) Mārtiņš Podžus	3–6, 7–6^{(8–6)}, 6–3
Win	2–1	Mar 2014	F2 Aktobe, Kazakhstan	Futures	Hard (i)	(Belarus) Yaraslav Shyla	6–4, 3–6, 6–3
Win	3–1	May 2014	F3 Moscow, Russia	Futures	Clay	(Russia) Stanislav Vovk	6–0, 6–4
Loss	3–2	Nov 2014	F3 Tartu, Estonia	Futures	Carpet (i)	(Belarus) Dzmitry Zhyrmont	4–6, 2–6
Win	4–2	Dec 2014	F4 Santo Domingo, Dominican Republic	Futures	Hard	(United States) Mitchell Krueger	6–2, 6–4

=== Doubles: 5 (3 titles, 2 runner-ups) ===
Legend ATP Challenger Tour (2–0) ITF Futures (1–2)	Finals by surface Hard (1–0) Clay (2–2)

Result	W–L	Date	Tournament	Tier	Surface	Partner	Opponents	Score
Win	1–0	Feb 2015	Dallas Tennis Championships, US	Challenger	Hard (i)	(Ukraine) Denys Molchanov	(Mexico) Hans Hach Verdugo (Mexico) Luis Patiño	6–4, 7–6^{(7–5)}
Win	2–0	Jul 2015	Padova Challenger, Italy	Challenger	Clay	(Russia) Mikhail Elgin	(Italy) Federico Gaio (Italy) Alessandro Giannessi	6–4, 7–6^{(7–4)}
Loss	0–1	Jul 2013	F7 Plovdiv, Bulgaria	Futures	Clay	(Belarus) Yaraslav Shyla	(Bulgaria) Alexandar Lazov (Chile) Laslo Urrutia Fuentes	6–4, 3–6, [8–10]
Win	1–1	May 2014	F1 Teplice, Czech Republic	Futures	Clay	(Poland) Andriej Kapaś	(Czech Republic) David Škoch (Czech Republic) Robin Staněk	7–5, 6–2
Loss	1–2	May 2014	F3 Moscow, Russia	Futures	Clay	(Russia) Denis Matsukevich	(Belarus) Egor Gerasimov (Russia) Stanislav Vovk	6–2, 4–6, [8–10]

== ITF Junior Circuit ==
=== Junior Grand Slam finals ===
==== Singles: 1 (title) ====
Result	Year	Tournament	Surface	Opponent	Score
Win	2014	French Open	Clay	(Spain) Jaume Munar	6–2, 7–5

==== Doubles: 1 (runner-up) ====
Result	Year	Tournament	Surface	Partner	Opponents	Score
Loss	2014	Wimbledon	Grass	(United States) Stefan Kozlov	(Brazil) Orlando Luz (Brazil) Marcelo Zormann	4–6, 6–3, 6–8

=== Youth Olympic Games ===
==== Singles: 1 (bronze medal) ====
Result	Year	Tournament	Surface	Opponent	Score
Bronze	2014	Youth Olympic Games	Hard	(Japan) Jumpei Yamasaki	6–1, 6–3

==== Doubles: 1 (silver medal) ====
Result	Year	Tournament	Surface	Partner	Opponents	Score
Silver	2014	Youth Olympic Games	Hard	(Russia) Karen Khachanov	(Brazil) Orlando Luz (Brazil) Marcelo Zormann	5–7, 6–3, [3–10]

== National and international participation ==
=== Team competitions finals (3 titles, 1 runner-up) ===
Finals by tournaments
Laver Cup (1–1)
ATP Cup (1–0)

Result	Year	Tournament	Surface	Team	Partner(s)	Opponent team	Opponent players	Score
Win	2021	ATP Cup	Hard	Russia	Daniil Medvedev	Italy	Fabio Fognini; Matteo Berrettini	2–0
Win	2021	Laver Cup	Hard (i)	Team Europe	Daniil Medvedev; Stefanos Tsitsipas; Alexander Zverev; Matteo Berrettini; Casper Ruud	Team World	Félix Auger-Aliassime; Denis Shapovalov; Diego Schwartzman; Reilly Opelka; John Isner; Nick Kyrgios	14–1
Win	2021	Davis Cup	Hard (i)	Russia Davis Cup team (RTF)	Daniil Medvedev; Aslan Karatsev; Karen Khachanov; Evgeny Donskoy	Croatia	Marin Čilić; Nino Serdarušić; Borna Gojo; Mate Pavić; Nikola Mektić	2–0
Loss	2023	Laver Cup	Hard (i)	Team Europe	Casper Ruud; Hubert Hurkacz; Alejandro Davidovich; Arthur Fils; Gaël Monfils	Team World	Taylor Fritz; Frances Tiafoe; Tommy Paul; Félix Auger-Aliassime; Ben Shelton; Francisco Cerúndolo	2–13

=== Davis Cup (20–10) ===
Group membership World Group / Finals (12–3) WG Play-off / Qualifiers (1–3) Group I (7–4)	Matches by surface Hard (20–9) Clay (0–1) Grass (0–0)	Matches by type Singles (12–5) Doubles (8–5)

- ▲ ▼ indicates the outcome of the Davis Cup match followed by the score, date, place of event, the zonal classification and its phase, and the court surface.

Result	No.	Rubber	Match type (partner if any)	Opponent nation	Opponent player(s)	Score
▲4–1; 12–14 September 2014; Olympic Stadium, Moscow, Russia; Europe/Africa second round play-off; hard(i) surface
Win	1	III	Doubles (w/ Konstantin Kravchuk)	Portugal	Gastão Elias / João Sousa	6–3, 6–4, 6–4
Win	2	V	Singles	Portugal	Frederico Ferreira Silva	6–4, 6–4
▲4–1; 6–8 March 2015; Sport Complex Gazprom Dobycha Yamburg, Novy Urengoy, Russia; Europe/Africa first round; hard(i) surface
Win	3	III	Doubles (w/ Konstantin Kravchuk)	Denmark	Thomas Kromann / Frederik Nielsen	6–1, 3–6, 6–3, 6–4
Win	4	V	Singles	Denmark	Martin Pedersen	6–4, 6–3
▲3–2; 17–19 July 2015; Fetisov Arena, Vladivostok, Russia; Europe/Africa second round; hard(i) surface
Loss	5	I	Singles	Spain	Tommy Robredo	2–6, 3–6, 3–6
Win	6	V	Singles	Spain	Pablo Andújar	6–4, 7–6^{(7–4)}, 6–3
▼1–4; 18–20 September 2015; Baikal-Arena, Irkutsk, Russia; World Group play-offs; hard(i) surface
Loss	7	II	Singles	Italy	Fabio Fognini	6–7^{(8–10)}, 2–6, 2–6
▲4–1; 15–17 July 2016; National Tennis Centre, Moscow, Russia; Europe/Africa second round; hard surface
Win	8	I	Singles	Netherlands	Robin Haase	7–6^{(7–2)}, 6–3, 6–4
Win	9	III	Doubles (w/ Konstantin Kravchuk)	Netherlands	Robin Haase / Matwé Middelkoop	6–3, 6–4, 7–5
▲3–1; 16–18 September 2016; National Tennis Centre, Moscow, Russia; World Group play-offs; hard surface
Win	10	III	Doubles (w/ Konstantin Kravchuk)	Kazakhstan	Andrey Golubev / Aleksandr Nedovyesov	6–3, 6–7^{(3–7)}, 6–2, 7–5
▼1–3; 15–17 September 2017; Kopaszi Dam, Budapest, Hungary; World Group play-offs; clay surface
Loss	11	I	Singles	Hungary	Márton Fucsovics	2–6, 4–6, 7–5, 6–2, 3–6
▼1–3; 6–7 April 2018; Luzhniki Small Sports Arena, Moscow, Russia; Europe/Africa second round; hard(i) surface
Loss	12	I	Singles	Austria	Dennis Novak	6–7^{(5–7)}, 4–6
Loss	13	III	Doubles (w/ Karen Khachanov)	Austria	Jürgen Melzer / Philipp Oswald	3–6, 6–7^{(3–7)}
▲3–1; 14–15 September 2018; Luzhniki Small Sports Arena, Moscow, Russia; Europe/Africa first round play-offs; hard(i) surface
Loss	14	III	Doubles (w/ Karen Khachanov)	Belarus	Max Mirnyi / Andrei Vasilevski	5–7, 3–6
▲3–1; 1–2 February 2019; Swiss Tennis Arena, Biel/Bienne, Switzerland; qualifying round; hard(i) surface
Loss	15	III	Doubles (w/ Evgeny Donskoy)	Switzerland	Jérôme Kym / Henri Laaksonen	6–4, 3–6, 6–7^{(1–7)}
▲2–1; 18 November 2019; Estadio Manolo Santana, Madrid, Spain; Finals group stage; hard(i) surface
Win	16	I	Singles	Croatia	Borna Gojo	6–3, 6–3
Win	17	III	Doubles (w/ Karen Khachanov)	Croatia	Ivan Dodig / Nikola Mektić	7–6^{(7–3)}, 6–4
▼1–2; 19 November 2019; Estadio Manolo Santana, Madrid, Spain; Finals group stage; hard(i) surface
Win	18	I	Singles	Spain	Roberto Bautista Agut	3–6, 6–3, 7–6^{(7–0)}
Loss	19	III	Doubles (w/ Karen Khachanov)	Spain	Marcel Granollers / Feliciano López	4–6, 6–7^{(5–7)}
▲2–1; 22 November 2019; Estadio Manolo Santana, Madrid, Spain; Finals quarterfinal; hard(i) surface
Win	20	I	Singles	Serbia	Filip Krajinović	6–1, 6–2
Win	21	III	Doubles (w/ Karen Khachanov)	Serbia	Novak Djokovic / Janko Tipsarević	6–4, 4–6, 7–6^{(10–8)}
▼1–2; 23 November 2019; Estadio Manolo Santana, Madrid, Spain; Finals semifinal; hard(i) surface
Win	22	I	Singles	Canada	Vasek Pospisil	6–4, 6–4
Loss	23	III	Doubles (w/ Karen Khachanov)	Canada	Vasek Pospisil / Denis Shapovalov	3–6, 6–3, 6–7^{(5–7)}
▲3–0; 27 November 2021; Madrid Arena, Madrid, Spain; Finals group stage; hard(i) surface
Win	24	I	Singles	Ecuador	Roberto Quiroz	6–3, 4–6, 6–1
Win	25	III	Doubles (w/ Aslan Karatsev)	Ecuador	Gonzalo Escobar / Diego Hidalgo	6–4, 4–6, 6–4
▲2–1; 28 November 2021; Madrid Arena, Madrid, Spain; Finals group stage; hard(i) surface
Loss	26	I	Singles	Spain	Feliciano López	6–2, 3–6, 4–6
Win	27	III	Doubles (w/ Aslan Karatsev)	Spain	Marcel Granollers / Feliciano López	4–6, 6–2, 6–4
▲2–0; 2 December 2021; Madrid Arena, Madrid, Spain; Finals quarterfinal; hard(i) surface
Win	28	I	Singles	Sweden	Elias Ymer	6–2, 5–7, 7–6^{(7–3)}
▲2–1; 4 December 2021; Madrid Arena, Madrid, Spain; Finals semifinal; hard(i) surface
Win	29	I	Singles	Germany	Dominik Koepfer	6–4, 6–0
▲2–0; 5 December 2021; Madrid Arena, Madrid, Spain; Finals final; hard(i) surface
Win	30	I	Singles	Croatia	Borna Gojo	6–4, 7–6^{(7–5)}

=== Laver Cup (3–3) ===
Matches by type
Singles (1–1)
Doubles (2–2)

Result	No.	Day	Match type (partner if any)	Opponent player(s)	Score
▲14–1; 24–26 September 2021; TD Garden, Boston, United States; hard (i) surface
Win	1	1 (1 point)	Singles	(Argentina) Diego Schwartzman	4–6, 6–3, [11–9]
Win	2	2 (2 points)	Doubles (w/ (Greece) Stefanos Tsitsipas)	(United States) John Isner / (Australia) Nick Kyrgios	6–7^{(8–10)}, 6–3, [10–4]
Win	3	3 (3 points)	Doubles (w/ (Germany) Alexander Zverev)	(United States) Reilly Opelka / (Canada) Denis Shapovalov	6–2, 6–7^{(4–7)}, [10–3]
▼2–13; 22–24 September 2023; Rogers Arena, Vancouver, Canada; hard (i) surface
Loss	4	1 (1 point)	Doubles (w/ (France) Arthur Fils)	(United States) Tommy Paul / (United States) Frances Tiafoe	3–6, 6–4, [6–10]
Loss	5	2 (2 points)	Singles	(United States) Taylor Fritz	2–6, 6–7^{(3–7)}
Loss	6	3 (3 points)	Doubles (w/ (Poland) Hubert Hurkacz)	(United States) Ben Shelton / (United States) Frances Tiafoe	6–7^{(4–7)}, 6–7^{(5–7)}

=== ATP Cup (4–1) ===
Matches by type
Singles (4–0)
Doubles (0–1)

Result	No.	Rubber	Match type (partner if any)	Opponent nation	Opponent player(s)	Score
▲2–1; 2–3 February 2021; Melbourne Park, Australia; group stage; hardcourt
Win	1	I	Singles	Argentina	Guido Pella	6–1, 6–2
Loss	2	III	Doubles (w/ Aslan Karatsev)	Argentina	Máximo González / Horacio Zeballos	4–6, 6–7^{(4–7)}
Win	3	I	Singles	Japan	Yoshihito Nishioka	6–1, 6–3
▲2–1; 6–7 February 2021; Melbourne Park, Australia; knockout stage; hardcourt
Win	4	I	Singles	Germany	Jan-Lennard Struff	3–6, 6–1, 6–2
Win	5	I	Singles	Italy	Fabio Fognini	6–1, 6–2

== Wins over top 10 players ==
- Rublev has a 27–50 record against players who were, at the time the match was played, ranked in the top 10.

Season	2014	2015	2016	2017	2018	2019	2020	2021	2022	2023	2024	2025	2026	Total
Wins	0	0	0	1	0	4	4	4	5	5	3	1	0	27

#	Player	Rk	Event	Surface	Rd	Score	Rk	Ref
2017
1.	(Bulgaria) Grigor Dimitrov	9	US Open, United States	Hard	2R	7–5, 7–6^{(7–3)}, 6–3	53	
2019
2.	(Austria) Dominic Thiem	4	Hamburg Open, Germany	Clay	QF	7–6^{(7–3)}, 7–6^{(7–5)}	78	
3.	(Switzerland) Roger Federer	3	Cincinnati Open, US	Hard	3R	6–3, 6–4	70	
4.	(Greece) Stefanos Tsitsipas	8	US Open, United States	Hard	1R	6–4, 6–7^{(5–7)}, 7–6^{(9–7)}, 7–5	43	
5.	(Spain) Roberto Bautista Agut	9	Davis Cup, Spain	Hard (i)	GS	3–6, 6–3, 7–6^{(7–0)}	23	
2020
6.	(Italy) Matteo Berrettini	8	US Open, United States	Hard	4R	4–6, 6–3, 6–3, 6–3	14	
7.	(Greece) Stefanos Tsitsipas	6	Hamburg Open, Germany	Clay	F	6–4, 3–6, 7–5	14	
8.	(Austria) Dominic Thiem	3	Vienna Open, Austria	Hard (i)	QF	7–6^{(7–5)}, 6–2	8	
9.	(Austria) Dominic Thiem	3	ATP Finals, United Kingdom	Hard (i)	RR	6–2, 7–5	8	
2021
10.	(Greece) Stefanos Tsitsipas	6	Rotterdam Open, Netherlands	Hard (i)	SF	6–3, 7–6^{(7–2)}	8	
11.	(Spain) Rafael Nadal	3	Monte-Carlo Masters, Monaco	Clay	QF	6–2, 4–6, 6–2	8	
12.	(Russia) Daniil Medvedev	2	Cincinnati Open, US	Hard	SF	2–6, 6–3, 6–3	7	
13.	(Greece) Stefanos Tsitsipas	4	ATP Finals, Italy	Hard (i)	RR	6–4, 6–4	5	
2022
14.	(Canada) Félix Auger-Aliassime	9	Open 13, France	Hard (i)	F	7–5, 7–6^{(7–4)}	7	
15.	(Serbia) Novak Djokovic	1	Serbia Open, Serbia	Clay	F	6–2, 6–7^{(4–7)}, 6–0	8	
16.	(United Kingdom) Cameron Norrie	9	US Open, United States	Hard	4R	6–4, 6–4, 6–4	11	
17.	Daniil Medvedev	5	ATP Finals, Italy	Hard (i)	RR	6–7^{(7–9)}, 6–3, 7–6^{(9–7)}	7	
18.	(Greece) Stefanos Tsitsipas	3	ATP Finals, Italy	Hard (i)	RR	3–6, 6–3, 6–2	7	
2023
19.	(Denmark) Holger Rune	10	Australian Open, Australia	Hard	4R	6–3, 3–6, 6–3, 4–6, 7–6^{(11–9)}	6	
20.	(United States) Taylor Fritz	10	Monte-Carlo Masters, Monaco	Clay	SF	5–7, 6–1, 6–3	6	
21.	(Denmark) Holger Rune	9	Monte-Carlo Masters, Monaco	Clay	F	5–7, 6–2, 7–5	6	
22.	(Norway) Casper Ruud	4	Swedish Open, Sweden	Clay	F	7–6^{(7–3)}, 6–0	7	
23.	(Germany) Alexander Zverev	10	Vienna Open, Austria	Hard (i)	QF	6–1, 6–7^{(5–7)}, 6–3	5	
2024
24.	(Australia) Alex de Minaur	10	Australian Open, Australia	Hard	4R	6–4, 6–7^{(5–7)}, 6–7^{(4–7)}, 6–3, 6–0	5	
25.	(Spain) Carlos Alcaraz	3	Madrid Open, Spain	Clay	QF	4–6, 6–3, 6–2	8	
26.	(Italy) Jannik Sinner	1	Canadian Open, Canada	Hard	QF	6–3, 1–6, 6–2	8	
2025
27.	(Australia) Alex de Minaur	8	Qatar Open, Qatar	Hard	QF	6–1, 3–6, 7–6^{(10–8)}	10	

* as of 15 August 2026

== Grand Slam seedings ==
Not seeded at all, or not seeded inside the top 10 Seeded 10–4 Seeded no. 3 Seeded no. 2 Seeded no. 1

Year	Australian Open	French Open	Wimbledon	US Open
2015	did not play	did not play	did not qualify	qualifier
2016	did not play	did not qualify	did not qualify	did not qualify
2017	qualifier	lucky loser	qualifier	not seeded
2018	30th	did not play	did not play	not seeded
2019	not seeded	did not play	not seeded	not seeded
2020	17th	13th	tournament cancelled*	10th
2021	7th	7th	5th	5th
2022	5th	7th	did not play	9th
2023	5th	7th	7th	8th
2024	5th	6th	6th	6th
2025	9th	17th	14th	15th
2026	13th	11th	12th	23rd

* Due to the COVID-19 pandemic, the 2020 Wimbledon Championships of the tournament was cancelled.

== ATP Tour career earnings ==
Year	Majors	ATP wins	Total wins	Earnings ($)	Money list rank
2013	0	0	0	$4,946	n/a
2014	0	0	0	$25,882	n/a
2015	0	0	0	$191,601	160
2016	0	0	0	$139,261	193
2017	0	1	1	$1,336,027	32
2018	0	0	0	$1,170,921	43
2019	0	1	1	$1,573,436	26
2020	0	5	5	$2,223,865	6
2021	0	1	1	$3,331,378	5
2022	0	4	4	$4,666,954	7
2023	0	2	2	$6,571,890	5
2024	0	2	2	$5,589,848	7
2025	0	1	1	$3,610,136	11
2026	0	0	0	$1,675,293	13
Career *	0	17	17	$33,679,899	12

* Statistics correct as of 15 June 2026.

== Exhibition matches ==
=== Singles ===
Result	Date	Tournament	Surface	Opponent	Score
Finalist	Jun 2020	Adria Tour, Croatia	Clay	(Serbia) Novak Djokovic	cancelled
Win	Jul 2020	Thiem's Seven, Austria	Clay	(Austria) Dominic Thiem	6–2, 5–7, [10–8]
Win	Dec 2021	Mubadala World Tennis Championship, Abu Dhabi, United Arab Emirates	Hard	(United Kingdom) Andy Murray	6–2, 7–6^{(7–2)}
Loss	Oct 2022	Red Bull Bassline Exhibition, Austria	Hard	(Bulgaria) Grigor Dimitrov	7–5, 5–7, 4–6
Loss	Dec 2022	Mubadala World Tennis Championship, Abu Dhabi, United Arab Emirates	Hard	(Greece) Stefanos Tsitsipas	2–6, 6–4, 2–6
Win	Mar 2023	Tennis Showdown Exhibition, Mexico	Hard	Daniil Medvedev	6–4, 2–6, 7–6^{(7–4)}
Win	Apr 2023	Red Bull Bassline Exhibition, Spain	Clay	(Norway) Casper Ruud	7–4, 7–2
Win	Jun 2023	Boodles Challenge, United Kingdom	Grass	(Italy) Lorenzo Musetti	6–3, 6–2
Win	Jul 2023	Copa del Rey de Ténis, Spain	Clay	(Croatia) Borna Ćorić	6–3, 7–6^{(7–1)}
Win	Sep 2023	Ultimate Tennis Showdown, Frankfurt, Germany	Hard	(Bulgaria) Grigor Dimitrov	14–13, 12–17, 11–10, 17–16
Loss	Dec 2023	Ultimate Tennis Showdown, London, United Kingdom	Hard (i)	(Denmark) Holger Rune	10–20, 11–12, 11–16
Win	Feb 2024	Ultimate Tennis Showdown, Oslo, Norway	Hard (i)	(Australia) Alex de Minaur	14–16, 17–10, 16–13, 20–12
Loss	Mar 2024	World Renowned Tennis Championship, Los Angeles, United States	Hard	Karen Khachanov	3–6, 6–4, [8–10]
Win	Jun 2024	Boodles Challenge, United Kingdom	Grass	(Serbia) Dušan Lajović	6–1, 6–4
Loss	Aug 2024	Ultimate Tennis Showdown, New York City, United States	Hard	(France) Gaël Monfils	12–19, 10–15, 14–18
Win	Dec 2024	MGM Macau Tennis Masters, Macau (SAR), China	Hard (i)	(Norway) Casper Ruud	6–4, 7–5
Loss	Apr 2025	Ultimate Tennis Showdown, Nîmes, France	Clay	(Norway) Casper Ruud	11–15, 8–17, 15–13, 18–12, 0–2
Win	Jun 2025	Boodles Challenge, United Kingdom	Grass	(Belgium) David Goffin	6–3, 6–2
Loss	Oct 2025	Ultimate Tennis Showdown, Hong Kong (SAR), China	Hard (i)	(Argentina) Francisco Cerúndolo	11–16, 16–17, 15–18
Loss	Dec 2025	Ultimate Tennis Showdown, London, United Kingdom	Hard (i)	(Norway) Casper Ruud	11–14, 8–17, 15–13, 18–12, 2–3
Loss	Apr 2026	Ultimate Tennis Showdown, Nîmes, France	Clay	(Canada) Félix Auger-Aliassime	18-11, 11–18, 18–17, 13–14, 2–3

=== Team competitions ===
Result	Date	Tournament	Surface	Team	Partner(s)	Opp. team	Opponent players	Score
Win	Dec 2023	World Tennis League, Abu Dhabi, United Arab Emirates	Hard	PBG Eagle	Daniil Medvedev; Sofia Kenin; Mirra Andreeva	SG Mavericks Kites	Grigor Dimitrov; Stefanos Tsitsipas; Aryna Sabalenka; Paula Badosa	29–26
Win	Dec 2024	World Tennis League, Abu Dhabi, United Arab Emirates	Hard	Falcons Game Changer	Denis Shapovalov; Caroline Garcia; Elena Rybakina	TSL Hawks	Jordan Thompson; Sumit Nagal; Aryna Sabalenka; Mirra Andreeva	20–16
Win	Dec 2024	MGM Macau Tennis Masters, Macau (SAR), China	Hard (i)	Michael Chang Team	Karolína Muchová	Li Na Team	Shang Juncheng; Wang Xinyu	6–4, 6–3
Win	Jan 2025	Australian Open Opening Week - Charity Match, Melbourne, Australia	Hard	World Team	Coco Gauff	Australia Team	Lleyton Hewitt; Daria Saville	7–5
Win	Dec 2025	World Tennis Continental Cup, Shenzhen, China	Hard (i)	World Team	Zhang Zhizhen; Elena Rybakina; Wang Xinyu	Europe Team	Flavio Cobolli; Valentin Vacherot; Iga Świątek; Belinda Bencic	15–7
