= Ultimate Tennis Showdown =

Exhibition tennis competition

- UTS 17

Exhibition
- Founded: 2020; 6 years ago
- Editions: 17
- Location: Changes with each event
- Surface: Hard (outdoor & indoor), Clay
- Website: https://www.uts.live/

The Ultimate Tennis Showdown (UTS) is an international individual tennis league that was founded in 2020. The competition was organised by tennis coach Patrick Mouratoglou and businessman Alex Popyrin, father of professional tennis player Alexei Popyrin. Originally created as a response to the disruption of the professional tennis season due to the COVID-19 pandemic, the UTS has since taken place every year except in 2022.

The first three events were held in 2020; the first two were organized at the Mouratoglou Tennis Academy in Biot near Nice and the third was held in Antwerp. In 2021, UTS returned to the Mouratoglou Academy for its fourth edition. After a two-year absence, UTS returned in July 2023 with a series of three events in the United States, Germany, and South Korea, designed to culminate in a new "Grand Final" at the end of the season, which took place at The ICC London, United Kingdom. The 2024 series featured 4 events, in Norway and then returning to the United States, Frankfurt and the Grand Final once again in the United Kingdom, this time taking place at the Copper Box Arena, London. Event 1 of the 2025 series was in Guadalajara, Mexico and then in Nîmes, France. The UTS Tour is due to make its debut in Asia in October 2025 with Chubb Life UTS Hong Kong by Humansa.

All events use a modified scoring format, with matches divided into eight-minute quarters. Among the features UTS has built into the tournament to differentiate the game are "bonus cards" that mean a player can make the next point worth more in the score.

== Format ==
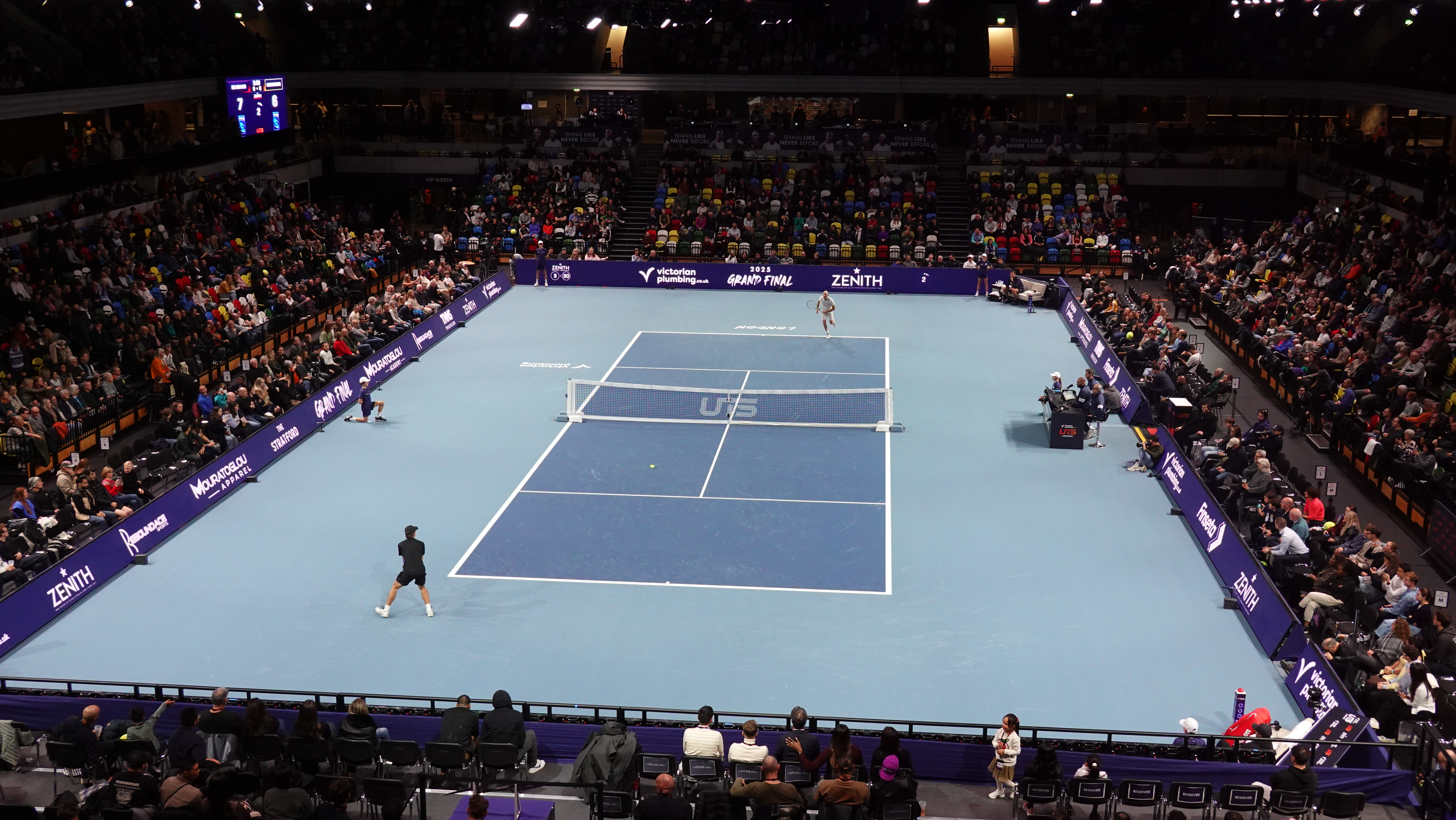
The Finals of the 2025 Ultimate Tennis Showdown was played at the Copper Box Arena, London.

UTS matches use a different format in comparison to traditional rules, including matches being divided into timed quarters rather than sets, a 15-second shot clock for serves and the ability to take a coaching timeout once per-set, and "cards" — which allow players to affect the game (such as taking away the opponent's second serve). Until UTS 4, even if a player had a majority in quarters, all 4 quarters were played for averaging purposes. If two players are equal in the amount of quarters won, a 'sudden death' is played, where the first player to win two consecutive points wins the match. Introduced in UTS 4, players only have one serve per point, where lets are played; and 'KO Mode', where if a player is leading by 10 points in the quarter, it is declared over.

The UTS also does not enforce a code of conduct.

== Past results ==
=== Men ===
Edition	Year	Location	Champions	Runners-up	Score
UTS 1	2020	Biot	(Italy) Matteo Berrettini; The Hammer	(Greece) Stefanos Tsitsipas; The Greek God	16–15, 15–12, 12–14, 8–15, 3–2
UTS 2	2020	Biot	(Germany) Alexander Zverev; The Lion	(Canada) Félix Auger-Aliassime; The Panther	19–10, 11–13, 10–18, 18–8, 3–1
UTS 3	2020	Antwerp	(Australia) Alex de Minaur; The Demon	(France) Richard Gasquet; The Virtuoso	24–9, 15–14, 20–10
UTS 4	2021	Biot	(France) Corentin Moutet; The Tornado	(United States) Taylor Fritz; The Hotshot	12–14, 15–11, 13–12, 16–8
UTS 5	2023	Los Angeles	(China) Wu Yibing; The Great Wall	(United States) Taylor Fritz (2); The Hotshot	11–16, 7–20, 12–11, 16–9, 2–0
UTS 6	2023	Frankfurt	Andrey Rublev; Rublo	(Bulgaria) Grigor Dimitrov; G-Unit	14–13, 12–17, 11–10, 17–16
UTS 7	2023	Seoul	postponed indefinitely		
UTS 8	2023	London	(United Kingdom) Jack Draper; The Power	(Denmark) Holger Rune; The Viking	12–14, 15–12, 13–10, 19–7
UTS 9	2024	Oslo	Andrey Rublev (2); Rublo	(Australia) Alex de Minaur; The Demon	14–16, 17–10, 16–13, 20–12
UTS 10	2024	New York	(France) Gaël Monfils; La Monf	(Kazakhstan) Alexander Bublik; The Bublik Enemy	10–20, 17–12, 17–14, 15–14
UTS 11	2024	Frankfurt	(United States) Ben Shelton; The Mountain	(France) Ugo Humbert; The Commander	10–19, 18–8, 15–11, 19–11
UTS 12	2024	London	(Australia) Alex de Minaur (2); The Demon	(Denmark) Holger Rune (2); The Viking	13–8, 14–11, 16–10
UTS 13	2025	Guadalajara	(Czech Republic) Tomáš Macháč; The Air Machete	(Belgium) David Goffin; The Wall	17–15, 15–14, 19–10
UTS 14	2025	Nîmes	(Norway) Casper Ruud; The Ice Man	(Czech Republic) Tomáš Macháč; The Air Machete	12–13, 16–14, 15–14, 15–11
UTS 15	2025	Hong Kong	(Argentina) Francisco Cerúndolo; El Canon	(United States) Jenson Brooksby; The Show	20–5, 10–12, 15–9, 17–7
UTS 16	2025	London	(Australia) Alex de Minaur (3); The Demon	(Norway) Casper Ruud; The Ice Man	11–15, 15–10, 15–11, 16–7
UTS 17	2026	Nîmes	(Canada) Félix Auger-Aliassime; The Gentle Warrior	(Norway) Casper Ruud (2); The Ice Man	10–11, 14–10, 14–15, 15–11, 2–0
UTS 18	2026	Rio de Janeiro	(United States) Brandon Nakashima; The Blade	(Brazil) Luís Guto Miguel; Guto	15–14, 17–14, 15–13
UTS 19	2026	Gothenburg	TBD		

=== Women ===
Edition	Year	Location	Champions	Runners-up	Score
UTS 2	2020	Biot	(Russia) Anastasia Pavlyuchenkova; The Thunder	(France) Alizé Cornet; The Volcano	16–8, 12–11, 11–14, 9–16, 3–1
