= 2021 ABN AMRO World Tennis Tournament =

- Date: 1–7 March
- Edition: 48th
- Category: ATP Tour 500
- Draw: 32S / 16D
- Prize money: €1,117,900
- Surface: Hard / indoor
- Location: Rotterdam, Netherlands
- Venue: Rotterdam Ahoy

Champions

Singles
- (Russia) Andrey Rublev

Doubles
- (Croatia) Nikola Mektić / (Croatia) Mate Pavić
- Rotterdam Open

The 2021 ABN AMRO World Tennis Tournament (or Rotterdam Open) is a men's tennis tournament played on indoor hard courts. It is taking place at the Rotterdam Ahoy arena in the Dutch city of Rotterdam, between 1 and 7 March 2021. It is the 48th edition of the Rotterdam Open, and part of the ATP Tour 500 series on the 2021 ATP Tour. The tournament also included a Men's Wheelchair Tennis Singles and Doubles draw.

== Finals ==
=== Singles ===
(Russia) Andrey Rublev defeated (Hungary) Márton Fucsovics, 7–6^{(7–4)}, 6–4

- It was Rublev's only singles title of the year and the 8th of his career.

=== Doubles ===
(Croatia) Nikola Mektić / (Croatia) Mate Pavić defeated (Germany) Kevin Krawietz / (Romania) Horia Tecău, 7–6^{(9–7)}, 6–2

== Points and prize money ==
=== Point distribution ===
Event	W	F	SF	QF	Round of 16	Round of 32	Q	Q2	Q1
Singles	500	300	180	90	45	0	20	10	0
Doubles	500	300	180	90	0	—N/a	—N/a	—N/a	—N/a

=== Prize money ===
Event	W	F	SF	QF	Round of 16	Round of 32	Q2	Q1
Singles	€89,265	€66,000	€47,000	€32,000	€20,000	€11,500	€5,300	€2,800
Doubles*	€29,100	€22,500	€16,500	€11,250	€7,700	—N/a	—N/a	—N/a

_{*per team}

== Singles main-draw entrants ==
=== Seeds ===
Country	Player	Ranking^{1}	Seed
RUS	Daniil Medvedev	3	1
GRE	Stefanos Tsitsipas	6	2
GER	Alexander Zverev	7	3
RUS	Andrey Rublev	8	4
ESP	Roberto Bautista Agut	13	5
BEL	David Goffin	15	6
CAN	Félix Auger-Aliassime	19	7
SUI	Stan Wawrinka	20	8

=== Other entrants ===
The following players received wildcards into the main draw:

- (Netherlands) Robin Haase
- (United Kingdom) Andy Murray
- (Netherlands) Botic van de Zandschulp
- (Germany) Alexander Zverev

The following players received entry as Special Exempt into the main draw:

- (Belarus) Egor Gerasimov

The following players received entry from the qualifying draw:

- (France) Jérémy Chardy
- (Hungary) Márton Fucsovics
- (United States) Marcos Giron
- (United Kingdom) Cameron Norrie

=== Withdrawals ===
- (Italy) Matteo Berrettini → replaced by (France) Adrian Mannarino
- (Spain) Pablo Carreño Busta → replaced by (Italy) Lorenzo Sonego
- (United Kingdom) Dan Evans → replaced by (Georgia (country)) Nikoloz Basilashvili
- (United States) Taylor Fritz → replaced by (United States) Tommy Paul
- (Serbia) Filip Krajinović → replaced by (Spain) Alejandro Davidovich Fokina
- (France) Gaël Monfils → replaced by (Japan) Kei Nishikori
- (Spain) Rafael Nadal → replaced by (United States) Reilly Opelka
- (Canada) Milos Raonic → replaced by (Kazakhstan) Alexander Bublik
- (Norway) Casper Ruud → replaced by (Australia) John Millman
- (Canada) Denis Shapovalov → replaced by (Germany) Jan-Lennard Struff

== Doubles main-draw entrants ==
=== Seeds ===
Country	Player	Country	Player	Rank^{1}	Seed
COL	Juan Sebastián Cabal	COL	Robert Farah	3	1
CRO	Nikola Mektić	CRO	Mate Pavić	8	2
NED	Wesley Koolhof	POL	Łukasz Kubot	19	3
BRA	Marcelo Melo	NED	Jean-Julien Rojer	36	4

- ^{1} Rankings as of February 22, 2021.

=== Other entrants ===
The following pairs received wildcards into the doubles main draw:

- (Netherlands) Robin Haase / (Netherlands) Matwé Middelkoop
- (Greece) Petros Tsitsipas / (Greece) Stefanos Tsitsipas

The following pair received entry from the qualifying draw:

- (Netherlands) Sander Arends / (Netherlands) David Pel

=== Withdrawals ===
Before the tournament

- (Croatia) Ivan Dodig / (Slovakia) Filip Polášek → replaced by (Japan) Ben McLachlan / (Japan) Kei Nishikori
- (United States) Rajeev Ram / (United Kingdom) Joe Salisbury → replaced by (Belgium) Sander Gillé / (Belgium) Joran Vliegen
- (Italy) Jannik Sinner / (Switzerland) Stan Wawrinka → replaced by (Serbia) Dušan Lajović / (Switzerland) Stan Wawrinka
- (France) Pierre-Hugues Herbert / (France) Nicolas Mahut → replaced by (France) Pierre-Hugues Herbert / (Germany) Jan-Lennard Struff
