= Fast4 Tennis =

Tennis match format

Fast4 Tennis is a format for playing a tennis match, initiated by Tennis Australia, which leads to a shorter match, by the use of varied rules compared to the traditional rules of tennis.

Whilst the majority of professional tournaments are still run using the traditional format, there have been some pilots of the format, or its variants, in professional tournaments (e.g. the Hopman Cup and the NextGen tournaments). However the 2018 NextGen tournament, for example, did not use the no-let serve, so was not strictly Fast4.

There is significant uptake of the format in some countries (such as the United Kingdom, encouraged by the UK governing body) in lower-level tournaments. The benefits of this include, shorter tournaments (hence less time commitment for players); shorter matches (less wear and tear especially on young players); typically more predictable court usage time. However some criticism exists, including, unpredictability of results in close matches due to the shorter format rules; reduction in on-court time per match (hence less match practice opportunity and effectively increased price per point); the encouragement of this shorter format whilst ignoring valid alternatives which do not have some of the features which are criticised in fast 4 (for example single-set matches, single tie break matches, traditional setting to 4 games).

Fast4 has been described as the tennis equivalent of the Twenty20 format of cricket.

The rules are similar to the traditional format, but are specifically targeted at shortening match time, including:-

- The use of no-let serves (a traditional “let” must be played as a normal point)
- Deciding point (a.k.a. sudden death deuce) in games on reaching deuce (40–40).
- A set is won if a player reaches 4 games with a 2-game lead
- A set tie-break takes place if the set score is 3–3
- The set tie break is won by the first player to win 5 points, with a deciding point if required, at 4–4.
- In some tournaments, the final set (i.e. at 1–1 or 2–2) is run as a match tie-break, which is won by the first player to win 10 points, with a deciding point if required, at 9–9.

With effect from September 2019, the UK governing body (the LTA) has harmonised to a single short match format for all short matches. It is still calling this Fast4, but has the following differences from the Australian Fast4 format:-

- The traditional let serve rule is to be used. Ie the no-let rule has been dropped.
- Traditional set tie break is to be used (first to 7 points with a 2-point margin)
- Traditional match tie break for the third set. This tie break is to 10 points with a 2-point margin.

The following are retained from the Australian Fast4 format

- Sudden death deuce
- A Set is won if a player wins 4 games with a 2-game lead.
- Set tie break at 3–3

== History ==
Trials of the format began in Melbourne in October 2014, with clubs around Australia trialing it.

The first major public match of Fast4 was on January 12, 2015, when Roger Federer and Lleyton Hewitt played in an exhibition match at Qantas Credit Union Arena in Sydney, Federer winning 4–3^{(5–3)}, 2–4, 3–4^{(3–5)}, 4–0, 4–2. The match was broadcast live nationally in Australia on Nine Network as well as some international networks.

Rafael Nadal also participated in the Fast4 promotion with an exhibition match on January 13, 2015 at Melbourne Park, site of the Australian Open. The match was played at Margaret Court Arena. Fernando Verdasco was one of the participants in the exhibition.

In December 2016, it was announced that the 2017 Hopman Cup would be the first official tournament to feature the Fast4 format, being applied only in mixed doubles matches.

In 2020, amid the suspension of the international tennis season due to the COVID-19 pandemic, world men's no. 1 Novak Djokovic organized a series of exhibition tournaments using the Fast4 format known as the Adria Tour.

== Rules ==
Rules expressed as differences from the traditional format

Fast4 Tennis rules are a modification to the traditional rules of tennis, with the major significant changes as shown below. Note that from 1 Sept 2019, the rules are different for UK LTA governed short matches. See the introduction for details of this revised format.

- Playing points
  - A serve which touches the net and then the first bounce is in the receiver's service court, is a legal serve. This is known as a No-let serve format.
  - Everything else about point play, corresponds to the traditional format.
  - Note that some tournaments which are badged as Fast4, either formally or by informal player agreement, do not operate no-let serves (see controversy section)
- Game format
  - Games which do not reach deuce, are identical to the traditional format
  - The winner of the first deuce point reached, wins the game. Ie if deuce is reached, it is treated as a “deciding point” otherwise known as “sudden death deuce”
  - Put simply, the first player to win 4 points in a game, wins the game (one of the reasons for the name of the format)
- Set format. A set can be one of the following:-
  - ‘’’Standard set’’’
    - If a player reaches 4 games, with a 2-game lead, they win the set (I.e. 4–0, 4–1, 4–2)
    - If play reaches 3–3, then a set tie-break takes place. This is similar to a traditional tie-break, but:-
      - The first player to win 5 points wins the tie-break (if 4–4 is reached, the next point is a deciding point I.e sudden death)
      - The players change ends after every 4 points played (including at 4–4)
  - ‘’’Deciding set (match tie break a.k.a. championship tie break)’’’
    - It is common in some Fast4 tournaments to use a match tie break if the match reaches 1 set each (3-set format) or 2 sets each (5-set format)
    - This is run on a more traditional match tie break basis
    - The tie break is won by the first player to win 10 points
    - I.e. If 9-9 is reached, the next point is a deciding point
    - The players change ends each time they have played 6 points (eg at 5–1, 9–3, 9–9)
- Match format. Matches can typically be as follows (as decided by the tournament organiser)
  - Best of 3 ‘standard’ sets
  - Best of 5 ‘standard’ sets
  - As above, but with a deciding set (match tie break)
- Tournament format
  - Fast4 can be, and is used in all types of tournament format, I.e knockout, knockout with back draw, compass draw, round robin etc.
  - Note that some tournaments use traditional format in the ‘main draw’ and to reduce match time, revert to Fast4 format for other matches (e.g. the ‘back draw’.

Summary reasons and explanation of the format

The shortened format offers a "fast" alternative to tennis, with four points, four games and four rules: there are no advantage scores, lets are played, tie-breakers apply at three games all and the first to four games wins the set.

Alternative set tie break format (9 Point Tie-breaker)

Similar to 12 point tiebreaker but with a few format changes especially on service order. First player to 5 points. Each player serves twice starting in deuce court switching sides after 4 points. At 4-all, a coin toss by the umpire (or racquet spin if none is present) determines who will serve the ninth point with the receiving player choosing sides on the final point.

Reference to Tennis Australia description of the rules

The full explanation of the Fast4 format and rules is available at Tennis Australia.

== Controversy ==
The wide uptake of the Fast4 format in competitive tennis in the UK has led to some criticism of some aspects of the format.

No-let serves

This rule means that serves which hit the net and still land in the service box, must be played. This includes serves which hit the net hard, and trickle over, or get significantly slowed by the net contact. This can therefore lead to unplayable serves, sometimes at key points in a match. This approach to lets has also led to confusion when switching between different types of tournament (i.e. the service receiver does not return a legal no-let serve, because in the traditional format this would be treated as a “let”, and re-played).

One main argument in favour of no-let serves, is that it eliminates the possibility of cheating by the receiver on the serve, where the receiver claims a valid serve had touched the net.

Games subject to too many chance events

Whilst the format will normally result in a balanced result between highly differing standards of player, the use of short sets, sudden death deuce, played lets, and short tie break formats can also lead to a strong element of chance between closely matched players. There is often limited opportunity to recover from a poor start, or a chance event such as a 'Fast4 Ace' (Net cord).

Reduction of on-court time in tournaments

There is also a concern that on-court time during tournaments can be reduced due to the shorter format, reducing participation time and effectively increasing the court time cost of tournaments, as some providers are keeping tournament prices and organisation the same for the faster format.

== Alternative shorter formats ==
Thirty30 tennis

In Thirty30 tennis, every game starts at 30–30.

”Modified Fast4”

Fast4 is an emerging format, and as can be seen, has a number of variants. Some variants are used to reduce the likelihood of matches being influenced by chance events. these include:-

- Reverting to traditional let, instead of the no-let rule. This addresses the “Fast4 Ace” issue, but re-introduces the chance of cheating on lets (see controversy section)
- Modified no-let, where the serve must reach the baseline (or even service line) before the second bounce.
- Delaying the deciding point in a game to the second deuce point. Also known as “silver deuce”. This removes the situation where the first player to reach “40”, has two game points.

Other short formats in regular use already

These address some of the features which are criticised in fast 4:-

- They do not normally use no-let serves
- Silver deuce can or should be used to improve match length and court time predictably

Hence there is more time to recover from a mistake, dip in form, or chance event.

Examples include:-

- Single-set matches, normally to 6 games, but also 8 (which is common in US college tennis)
- Single tie break matches
- Traditional setting to 4 games with 3rd set tie break to 10 points.
