= Adria Tour =

Exhibition tennis tournament held in June 2020

Defunct tennis tournament
- Founded: 2020
- Abolished: 2020
- Location: Belgrade, Serbia; Zadar, Croatia
- Category: Exhibition
- Surface: Clay / outdoor

The Adria Tour was an exhibition tennis tour held in June 2020 in Belgrade, Serbia and Zadar, Croatia. It was organized by the world No. 1 ranked player Novak Djokovic during the ATP Tour's shutdown due to the COVID-19 pandemic.

The event fell under heavy criticism due to its lack of social distancing procedures, and allowing a full crowd, unlike the simultaneous Ultimate Tennis Showdown. A planned Montenegrin leg was cancelled due to COVID-19 concerns. During the Croatian leg, Grigor Dimitrov, one of the marquee players, announced that he had tested positive for the virus, leading to the event being abandoned. Borna Ćorić, Dimitrov's last opponent, tested positive the next day. Viktor Troicki and Djokovic himself tested positive over the next two days.

== Tournament ==
After the ATP announced on 12 March that all tennis events would be suspended for at least six weeks due to the COVID-19 pandemic, Novak Djokovic proposed an exhibition tournament in his home region of the Balkans from 13 June to 5 July. The schedule and locations proposed were:

- Belgrade, Serbia — 13–14 June
- Zadar, Croatia — 20–21 June
- Montenegro — 27–28 June
- Banja Luka, Bosnia and Herzegovina — 3–4 July
- Sarajevo, Bosnia and Herzegovina — 5 July

Unusually for events during the pandemic, fans were allowed to attend, but organizers said that a one-meter distance between each spectator would be enforced. This was not the case during the Serbian leg, however, which was tightly packed.

=== Format ===
The matches proposed were a shorter version of tennis called Fast4 Tennis where the first player to win 4 games wins the set, with 2 sets winning the match. Each stop on the tour followed a round-robin system between players in two pools, with the pool winners playing in a final.

=== Participants ===
The following is a list of players for the tournament:

Player	Rank
(Serbia) Novak Djokovic	1
(Austria) Dominic Thiem	3
(Germany) Alexander Zverev	7
(Russia) Andrey Rublev	14
(Bulgaria) Grigor Dimitrov	19
(Serbia) Dušan Lajović	23
(Serbia) Filip Krajinović	32
(Croatia) Borna Ćorić	33
(Croatia) Marin Čilić	37
(Bosnia and Herzegovina) Damir Džumhur	107
(Serbia) Danilo Petrović	157
(Serbia) Viktor Troicki	184
(Serbia) Peđa Krstin	246
(Croatia) Nino Serdarušić	299

- Singles rankings as of 16 March 2020 (rankings are frozen until the resumption of the season in August 2020)

The singles competitors secured for the event were top players, compared to other unofficial tournaments around the same time.

=== Finals ===
In the Belgrade tournament, Dominic Thiem defeated surprise finalist Filip Krajinović in three sets in the first leg. The cancelled final of the second leg was to be between Novak Djokovic and Andrey Rublev.

Location	Champion	Runner-up	Score
(Serbia) Belgrade	(Austria) Dominic Thiem	(Serbia) Filip Krajinović	4–3^{(7–2)}, 2–4, 4–2
(Croatia) Zadar	(Serbia) Novak Djokovic vs. (Russia) Andrey Rublev		Final cancelled
(Montenegro) not determined	Tournament abandoned		
(Bosnia and Herzegovina) Banja Luka	Tournament abandoned		
(Bosnia and Herzegovina) Sarajevo	Tournament abandoned		

== Aftermath ==
It was revealed on 21 June that Grigor Dimitrov tested positive for COVID-19 after participating in the Zadar event and then returning to his home in Monaco. The announcement by Dimitrov on Instagram took place shortly before the final was to be played in Zadar, with the crowd awaiting the players to enter the court. After Dimitrov's announcement, the final was cancelled.

Social media posts and photographs of the players showed them hugging, shaking hands, playing basketball, and dancing together during the event, as well as during the previous event a week and a half earlier in Belgrade.

Borna Ćorić, who played against Dimitrov at the Zadar event and was seen to hug Dimitrov before the game, also revealed on 22 June that he tested positive for COVID-19. Viktor Troicki and his pregnant wife Aleksandra announced they had tested positive hours later.

On 23 June, Djokovic announced that both he and his wife Jelena had also tested positive for COVID-19.

On 26 June, Djokovic's coach Goran Ivanišević confirmed that he had tested positive for the virus as well.

== See also ==
- 2020 Novak Djokovic tennis season
- COVID-19 pandemic in Croatia
- COVID-19 pandemic in Serbia

== Gallery ==
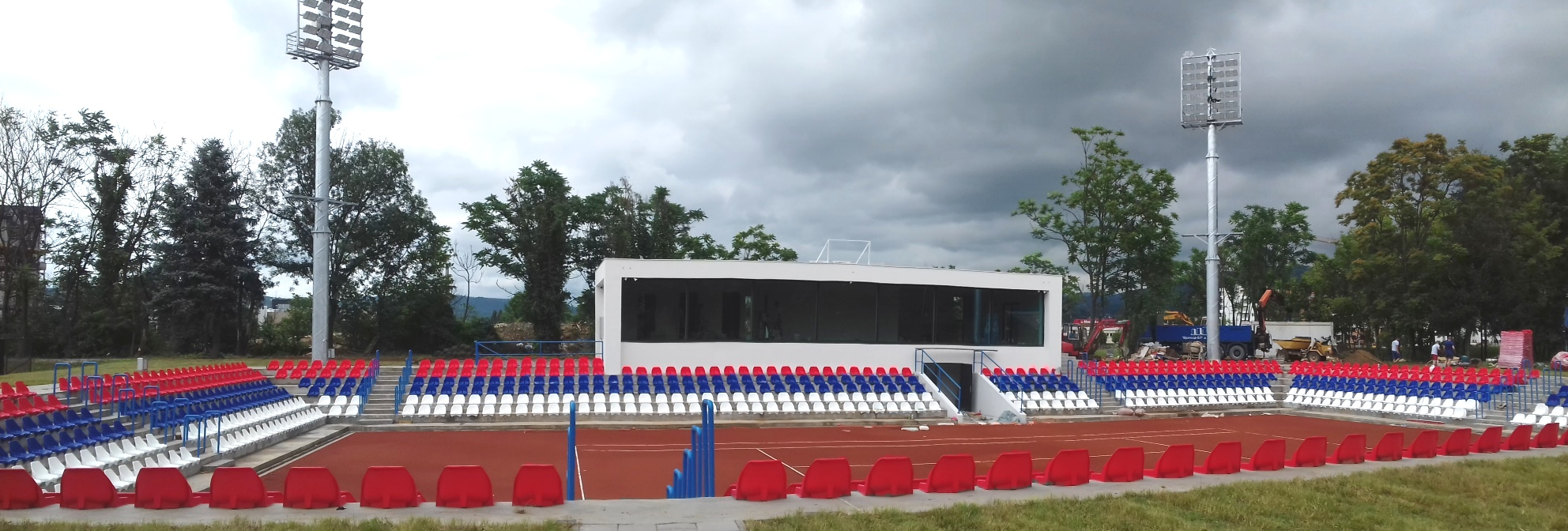
Tennis court in Banja Luka made for Adria tour
