= 2021 ABN AMRO World Tennis Tournament – Doubles =

Doubles
- 2021 ABN AMRO World Tennis Tournament

Final
- Champions: (Croatia) Nikola Mektić (Croatia) Mate Pavić
- Runners-up: (Germany) Kevin Krawietz (Romania) Horia Tecău
- Score: 7–6^{(9–7)}, 6–2

Details
- Draw: 16
- Seeds: 4

Events
Singles	Doubles
← 2020 ·	Rotterdam Open	· 2022 →

Pierre-Hugues Herbert and Nicolas Mahut were the defending champions but Mahut chose not to participate. Herbert partnered Jan-Lennard Struff, but they lost in the quarterfinals to Nikola Mektić and Mate Pavić.

Mektić and Pavić won the title, defeating Kevin Krawietz and Horia Tecău in the final, 7–6^{(9–7)}, 6–2.

== Seeds ==
1. (Colombia) Juan Sebastián Cabal / (Colombia) Robert Farah (first round)
2. (Croatia) Nikola Mektić / (Croatia) Mate Pavić (champions)
3. (Netherlands) Wesley Koolhof / (Poland) Łukasz Kubot (quarterfinals)
4. (Brazil) Marcelo Melo / (Netherlands) Jean-Julien Rojer (first round)

== Draw ==
=== Key ===
- Q = Qualifier
- WC = Wild card
- LL = Lucky loser
- Alt = Alternate
- ITF = ITF entry
- PR = Protected ranking
- SR = Special ranking
- SE = Special exempt
- JE = Junior exempt
- JR = Junior Accelerator Programme entrant
- CO = College Accelerator Programme entrant
- NG = Next Gen Accelerator Program entrant
- w/o = Walkover
- r = Retired
- d = Defaulted

=== Draw ===
First round
1	(Colombia) JS Cabal (Colombia) R Farah	6	3	[9]
(Finland) H Kontinen (France) É Roger-Vasselin	4	6	[11]
(Belgium) S Gillé (Belgium) J Vliegen	2	3
WC	(Greece) Pe Tsitsipas (Greece) S Tsitsipas	6	6
4	(Brazil) M Melo (Netherlands) J-J Rojer	3	6	[9]
(Germany) K Krawietz (Romania) H Tecău	6	3	[11]
(Serbia) D Lajović (Switzerland) S Wawrinka	1	6	[2]
(Russia) K Khachanov (Russia) A Rublev	6	3	[10]
Q	(Netherlands) S Arends (Netherlands) D Pel	4	4
(France) J Chardy (France) F Martin	6	6
PR	(Japan) B McLachlan (Japan) K Nishikori	5	6	[6]
3	(Netherlands) W Koolhof (Poland) Ł Kubot	7	3	[10]
(France) P-H Herbert (Germany) J-L Struff	6^{5}	6	[10]
(Canada) F Auger-Aliassime (Poland) H Hurkacz	7^{7}	3	[8]
WC	(Netherlands) R Haase (Netherlands) M Middelkoop	2	6^{3}
2	(Croatia) N Mektić (Croatia) M Pavić	6	7^{7}

Quarterfinals
(Finland) H Kontinen (France) É Roger-Vasselin	6	7^{7}
WC	(Greece) Pe Tsitsipas (Greece) S Tsitsipas	2	6^{4}
(Germany) K Krawietz (Romania) H Tecău	6	6
(Russia) K Khachanov (Russia) A Rublev	3	4
(France) J Chardy (France) F Martin	6	6
3	(Netherlands) W Koolhof (Poland) Ł Kubot	4	3
(France) P-H Herbert (Germany) J-L Struff	6	3	[7]
2	(Croatia) N Mektić (Croatia) M Pavić	3	6	[10]

Semifinals
(Finland) H Kontinen (France) É Roger-Vasselin	6^{5}	7^{7}	[6]
(Germany) K Krawietz (Romania) H Tecău	7^{7}	6^{3}	[10]
(France) J Chardy (France) F Martin	6^{3}	7^{13}	[4]
2	(Croatia) N Mektić (Croatia) M Pavić	7^{7}	6^{11}	[10]

Final
(Germany) K Krawietz (Romania) H Tecău	6^{7}	2
2	(Croatia) N Mektić (Croatia) M Pavić	7^{9}	6

== Qualifying ==
=== Seeds ===
1. (Denmark) Frederik Nielsen / (Germany) Tim Pütz (first round)
2. (India) Divij Sharan / (Slovakia) Igor Zelenay (qualifying competition)

=== Qualifiers ===
1. (Netherlands) Sander Arends / (Netherlands) David Pel

=== Qualifying draw ===
First round
1	(Denmark) Frederik Nielsen (Germany) Tim Pütz	3	4
(Netherlands) Sander Arends (Netherlands) David Pel	6	6
WC	(Netherlands) Tallon Griekspoor (Netherlands) Botic van de Zandschulp	2	4
2	(India) Divij Sharan (Slovakia) Igor Zelenay	6	6

Qualifying competition
(Netherlands) Sander Arends (Netherlands) David Pel	6	7
2	(India) Divij Sharan (Slovakia) Igor Zelenay	3	5
