= 2023 Laver Cup =

Sixth edition of the Laver Cup, a men's tennis tournament

- Date: 22–24 September 2023
- Edition: 6th
- Surface: Hard (indoor)
- Location: Vancouver, Canada
- Venue: Rogers Arena

Champions
- Team World; 13 – 2
- Laver Cup

The 2023 Laver Cup was the sixth edition of the Laver Cup, a men's tennis tournament between teams from Europe and the rest of the world. It was held on an indoor hard court at the Rogers Arena in Vancouver, Canada from 22 until 24 September.

Team World won their second consecutive title after winning the Laver Cup for the first time last year.

In the 2023 Laver Cup, Team World achieved a dominant 13–2 victory over Team Europe.

== Player selection ==
On 2 February 2023, Félix Auger-Aliassime was the first player to confirm his participation for Team World. On 17 April 2023, Taylor Fritz and Frances Tiafoe were the next players to announce their participation for this team, as well as Nick Kyrgios on 24 April, who withdrew on 11 August.

On 20 April 2023, Stefanos Tsitsipas, Andrey Rublev and, on 25 April, Holger Rune were the first players confirmed for Team Europe. On 14 June 2023, Casper Ruud announced that he would also join this team.

On 23 August 2023, both teams announced their final line-ups. As their final picks, Team Europe captain Björn Borg chose Hubert Hurkacz and Gaël Monfils while Team World captain John McEnroe named Tommy Paul, Francisco Cerúndolo and Ben Shelton. On 14 September 2023, it was announced that Milos Raonic would be joining Team World as an alternate. Shortly before the start of the tournament, Rune and Tsitsipas withdrew due to injuries and were replaced by Alejandro Davidovich Fokina and Arthur Fils.

== Participants ==
Team Europe
Captain: (Sweden) Björn Borg
Vice-captain: (Sweden) Thomas Enqvist
| Player | Rank |
| (Denmark) ~~Holger Rune~~ | 4 |
| (Greece) ~~Stefanos Tsitsipas~~ | 5 |
| Andrey Rublev | 6 |
| (Norway) Casper Ruud | 9 |
| (Poland) Hubert Hurkacz | 16 |
| (Spain) Alejandro Davidovich Fokina | 25 |
| (France) Gaël Monfils | 35^{PR(142)} |
| (France) Arthur Fils | 44 |

Team World
Captain: (United States) John McEnroe
Vice-captain: (United States) Patrick McEnroe
| Player | Rank |
| (United States) Taylor Fritz | 8 |
| (United States) Frances Tiafoe | 11 |
| (United States) Tommy Paul | 13 |
| (Canada) Félix Auger-Aliassime | 14 |
| (United States) Ben Shelton | 19 |
| (Argentina) Francisco Cerúndolo | 21 |
| (Australia) ~~Nick Kyrgios~~ | 21^{PR(472)} |
| (United States) Christopher Eubanks | 32 |
| (Canada) Milos Raonic | 33^{PR(322)} |

- Singles rankings as of 18 September 2023
- PR = Protected ranking

| Withdrew |
| Alternate |

Team Europe

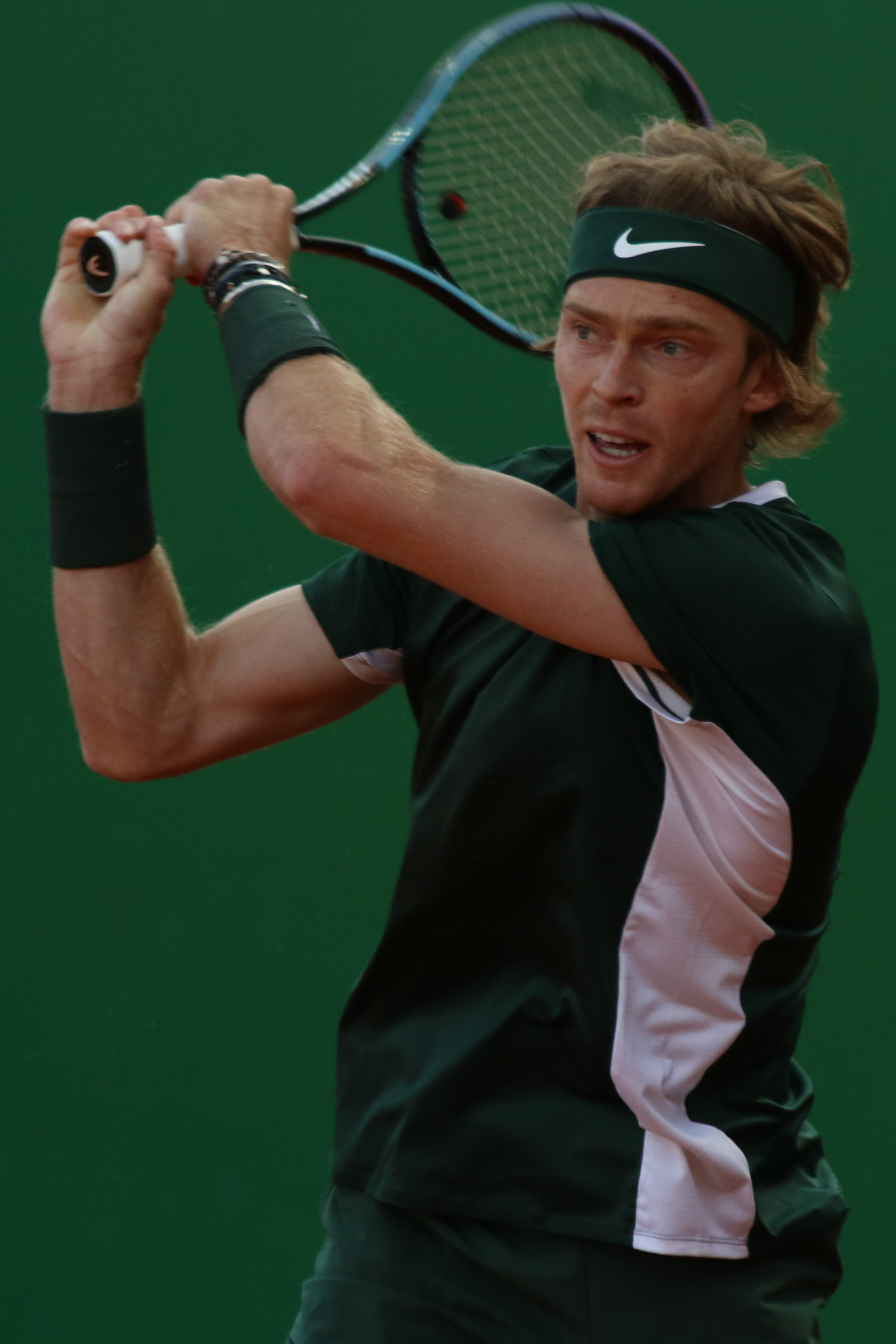
Rublev

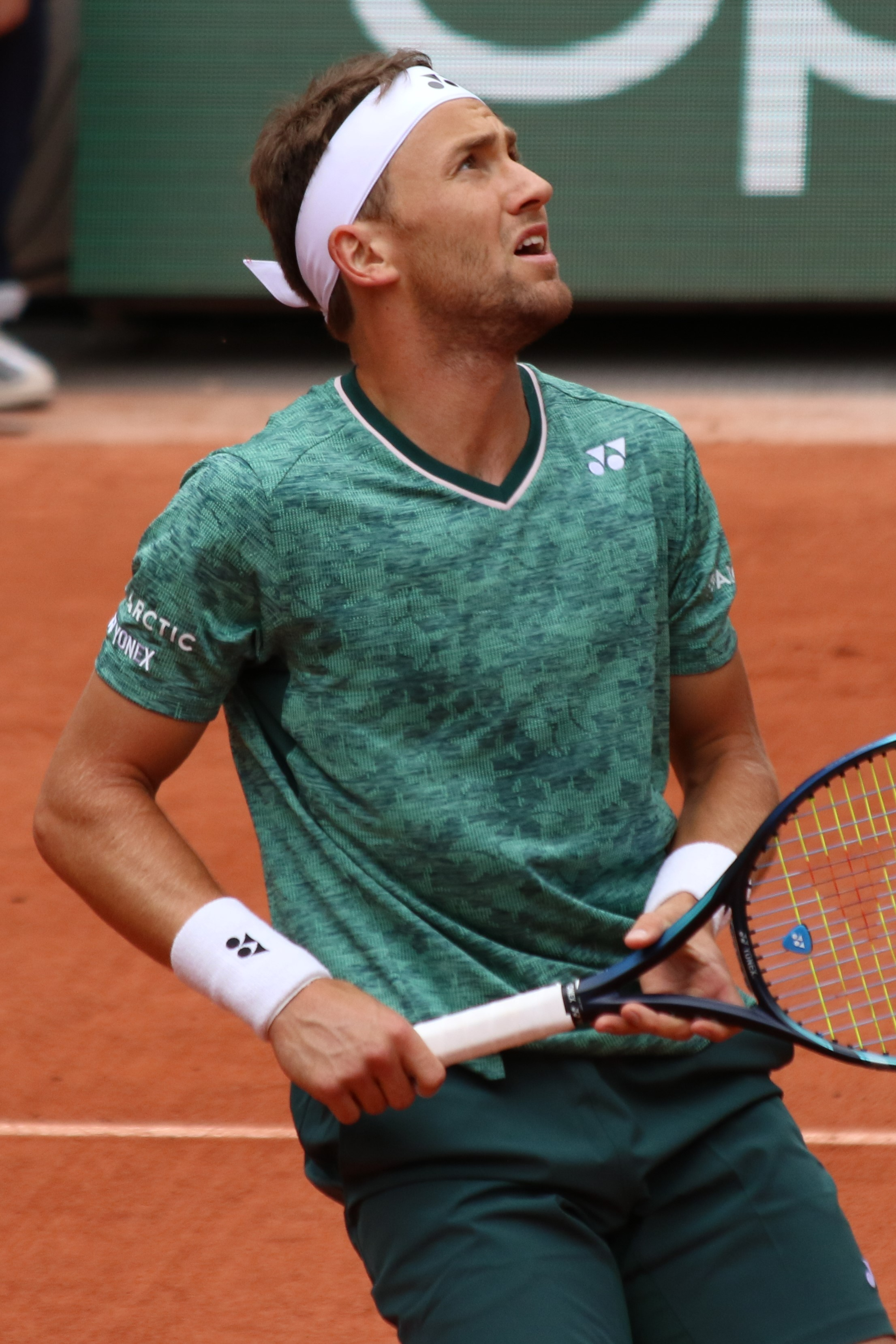
Ruud

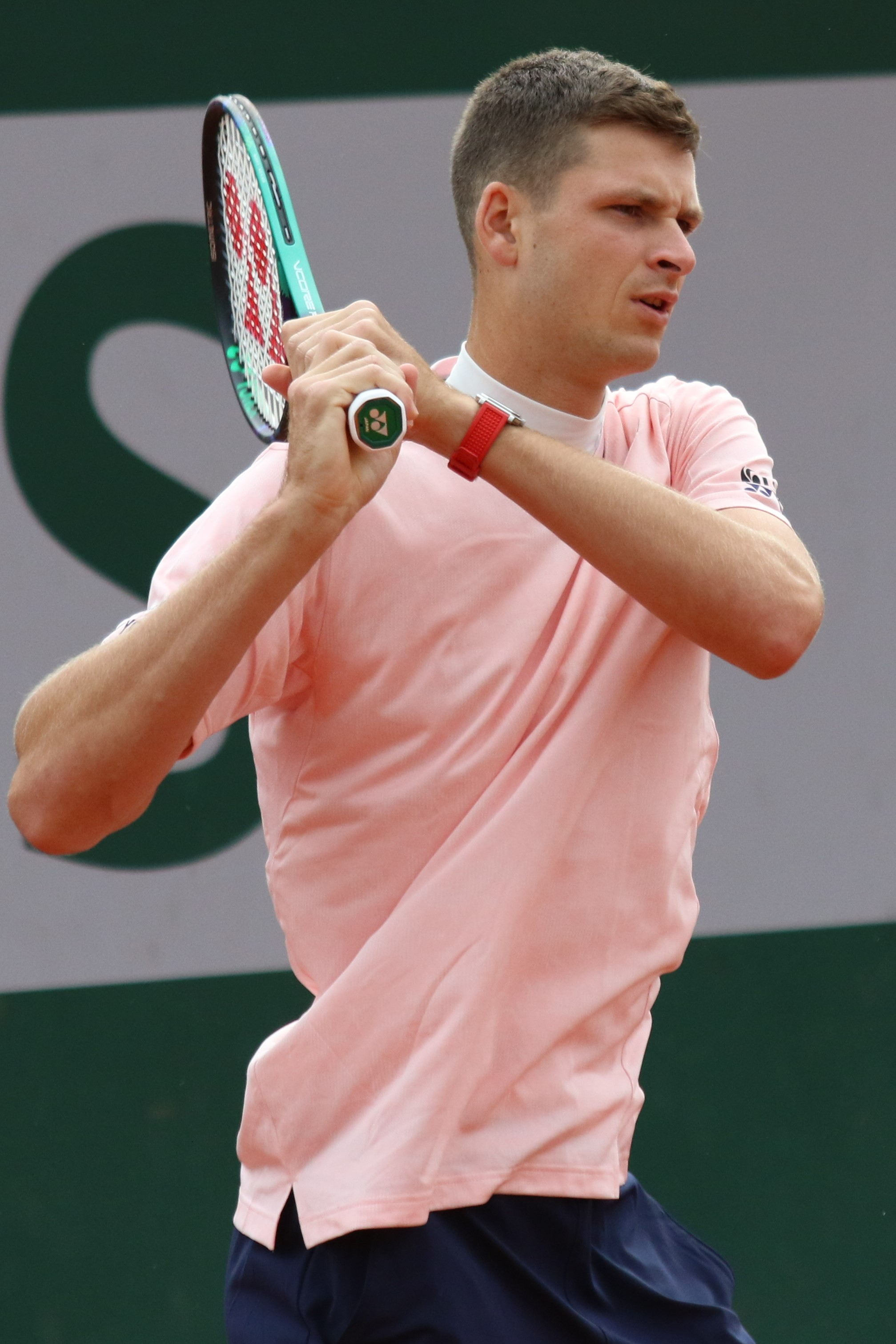
Hurkacz

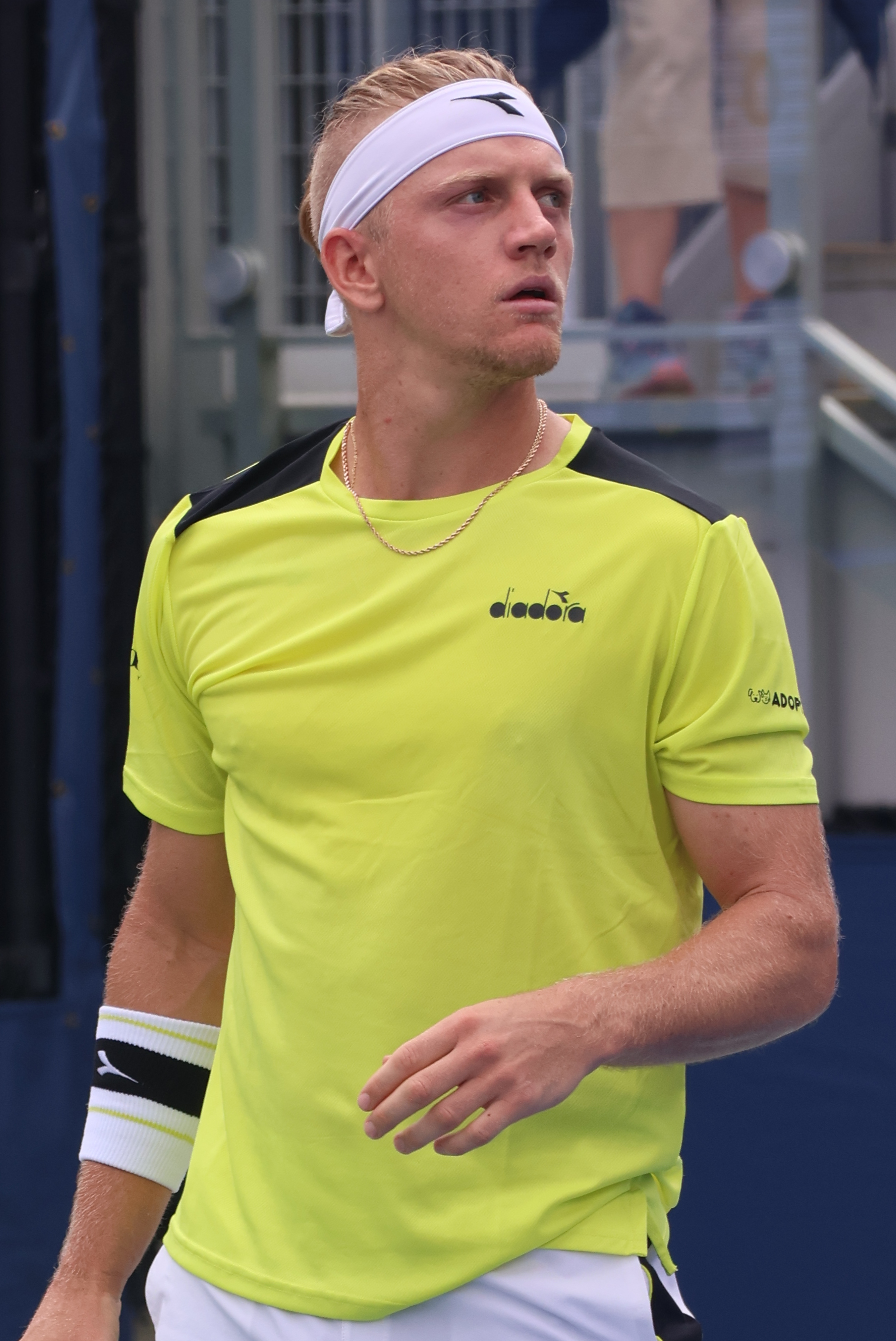
Davidovich Fokina

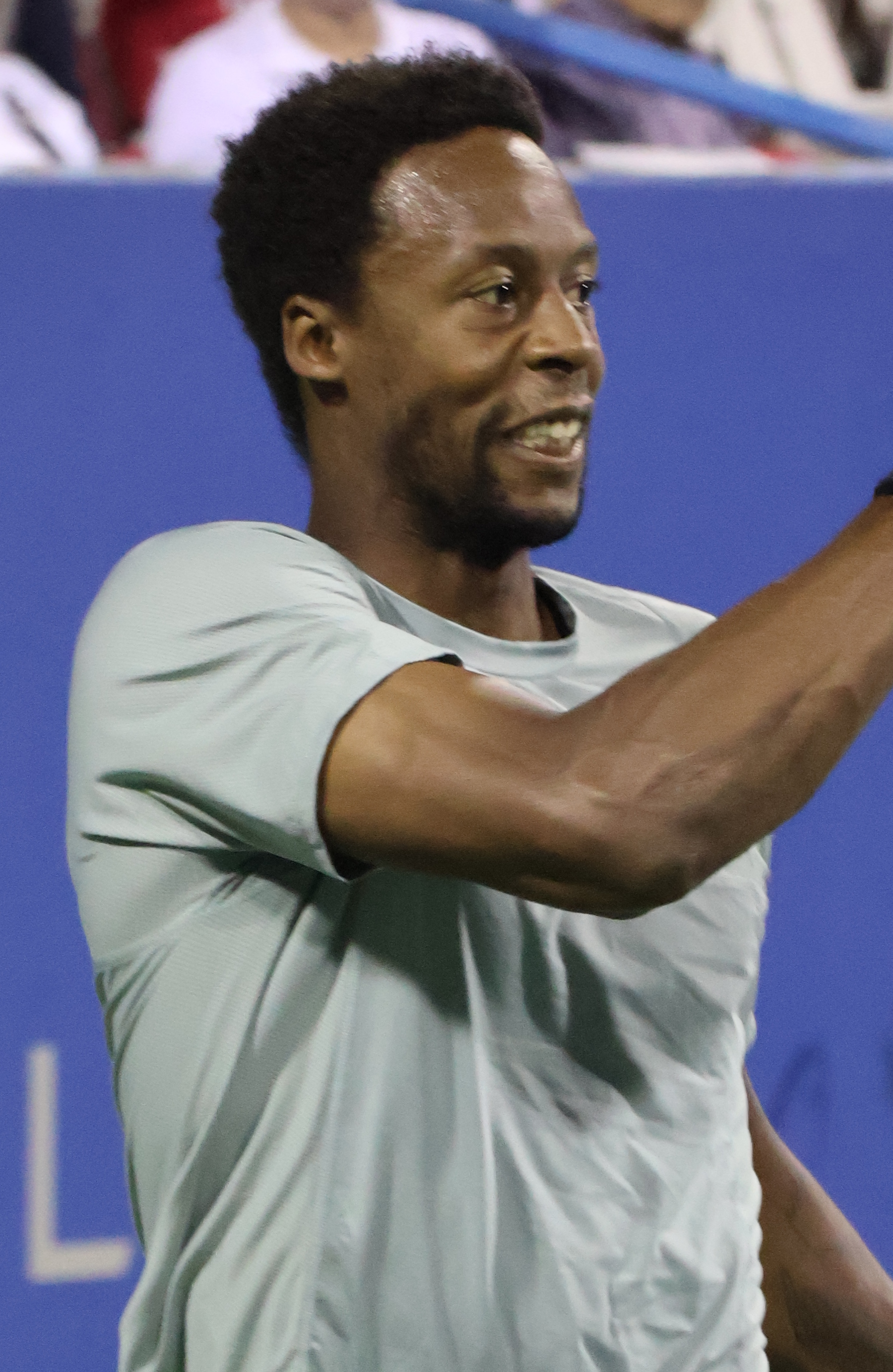
Monfils

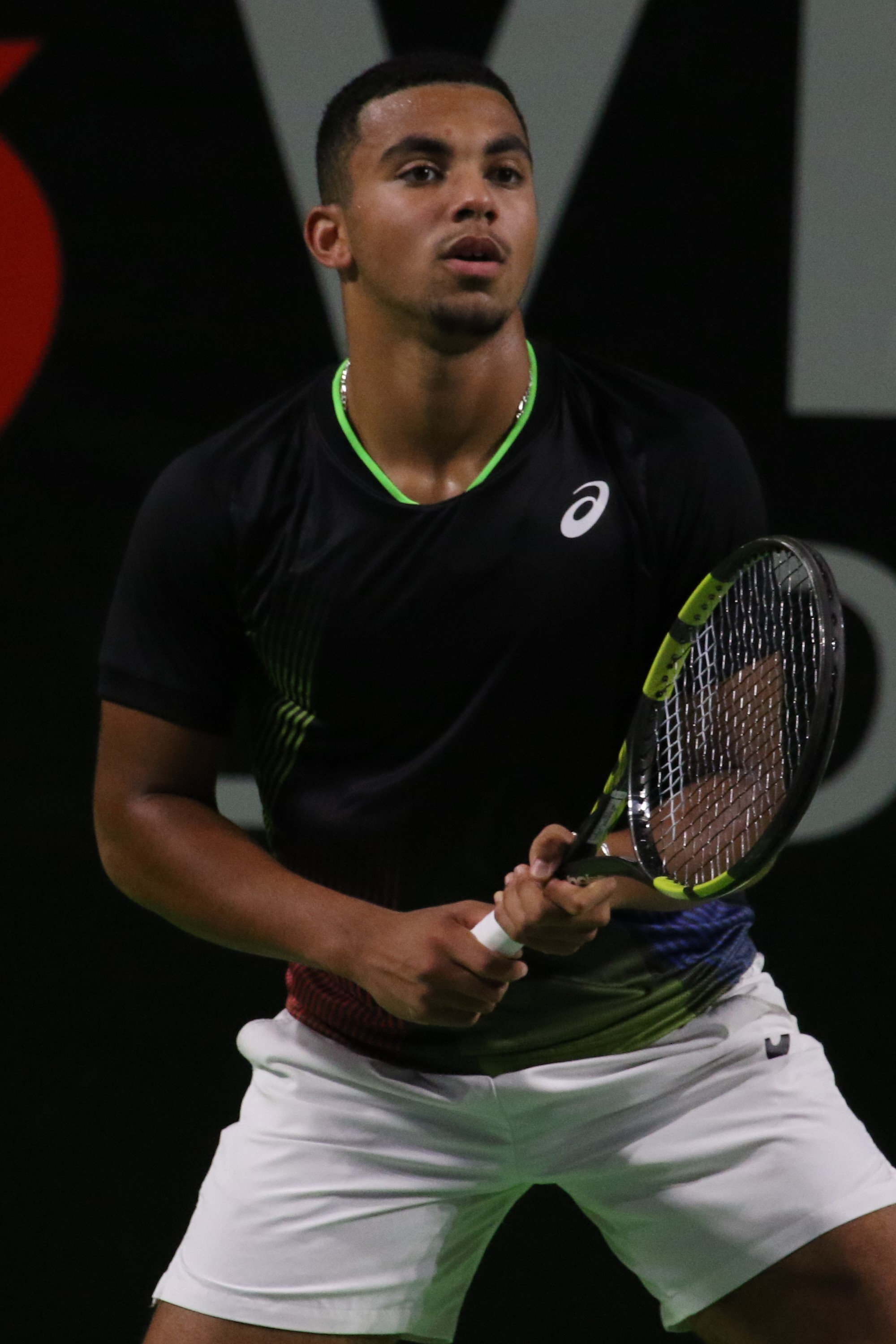
Fils

Team World

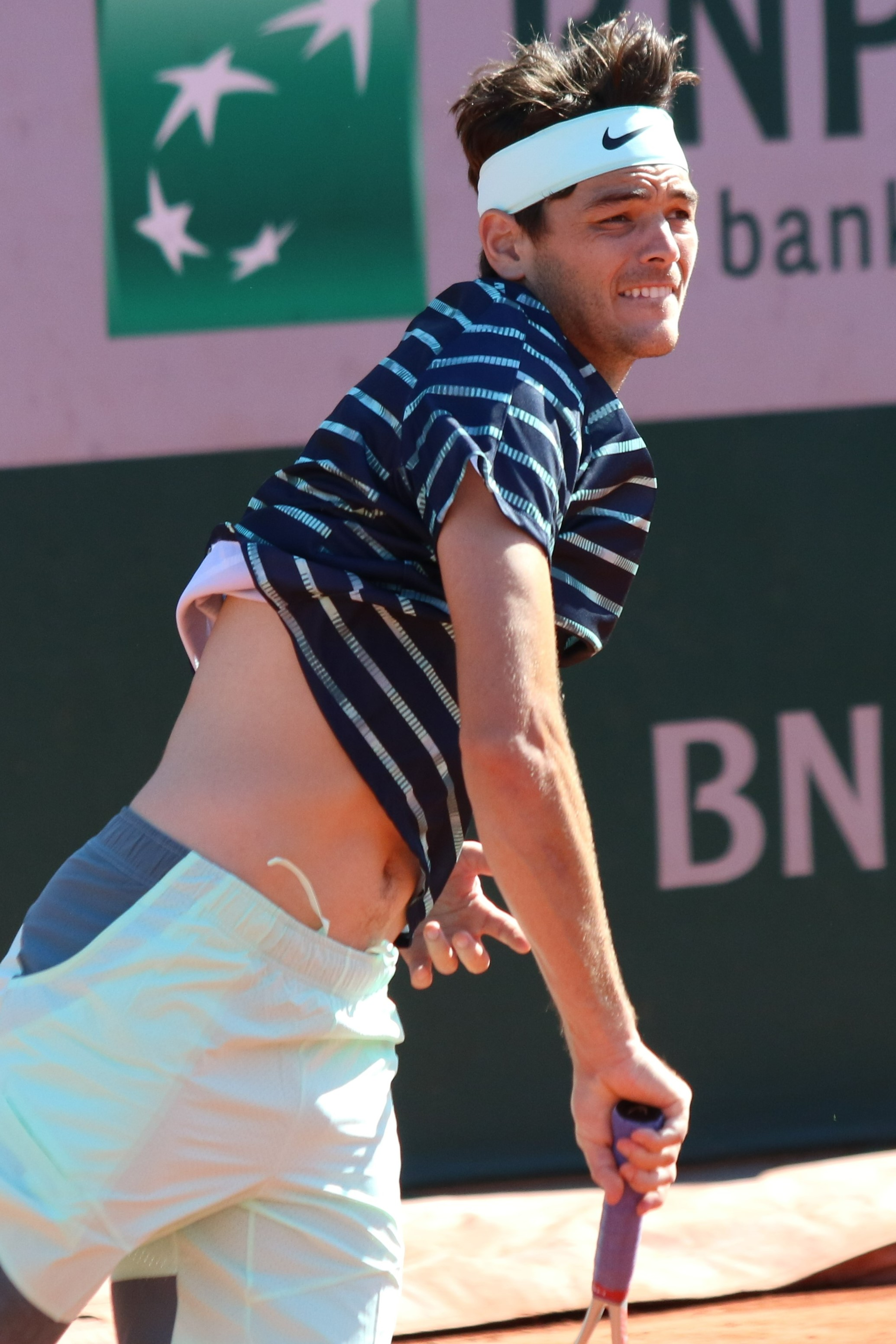
Fritz

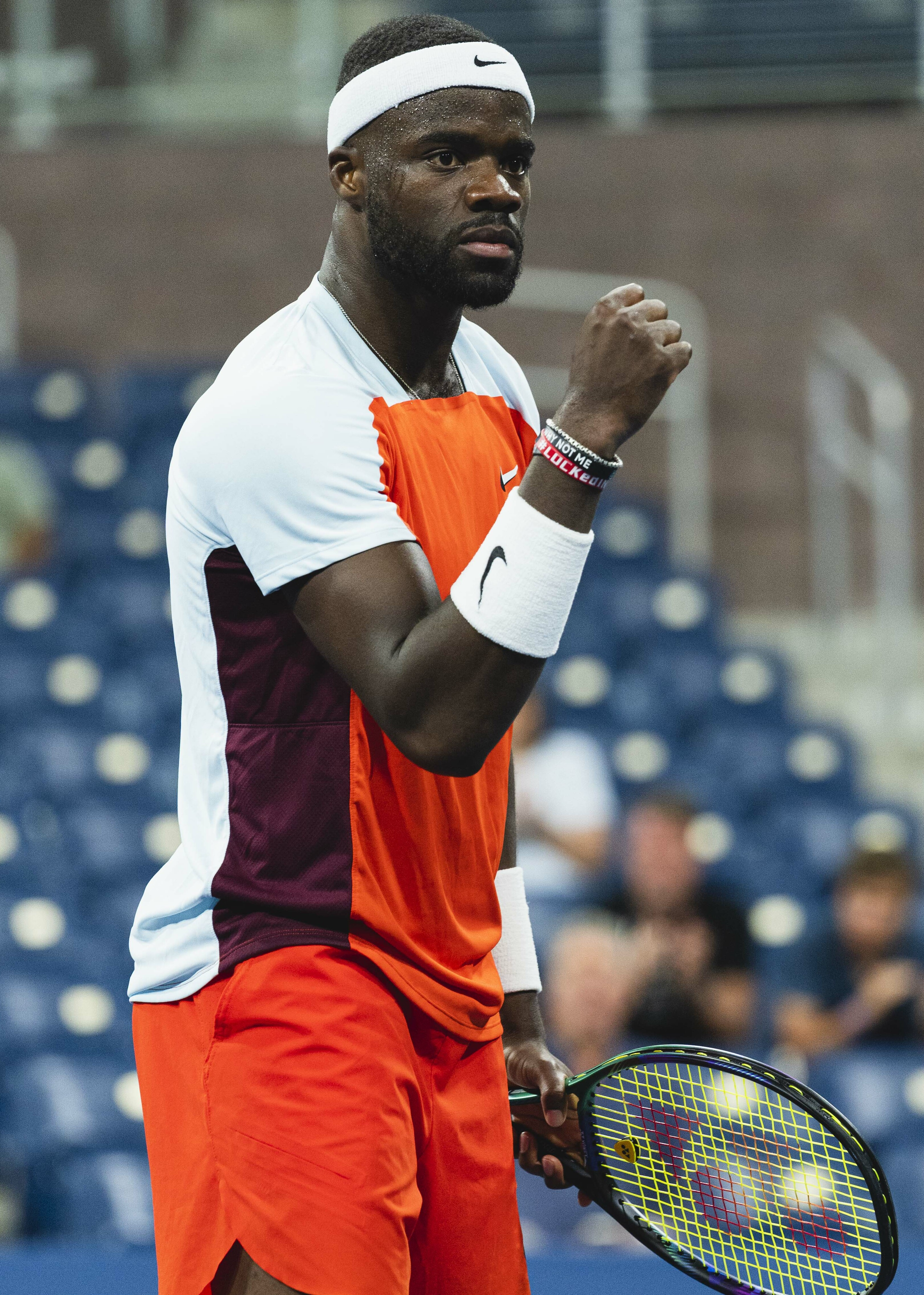
Tiafoe

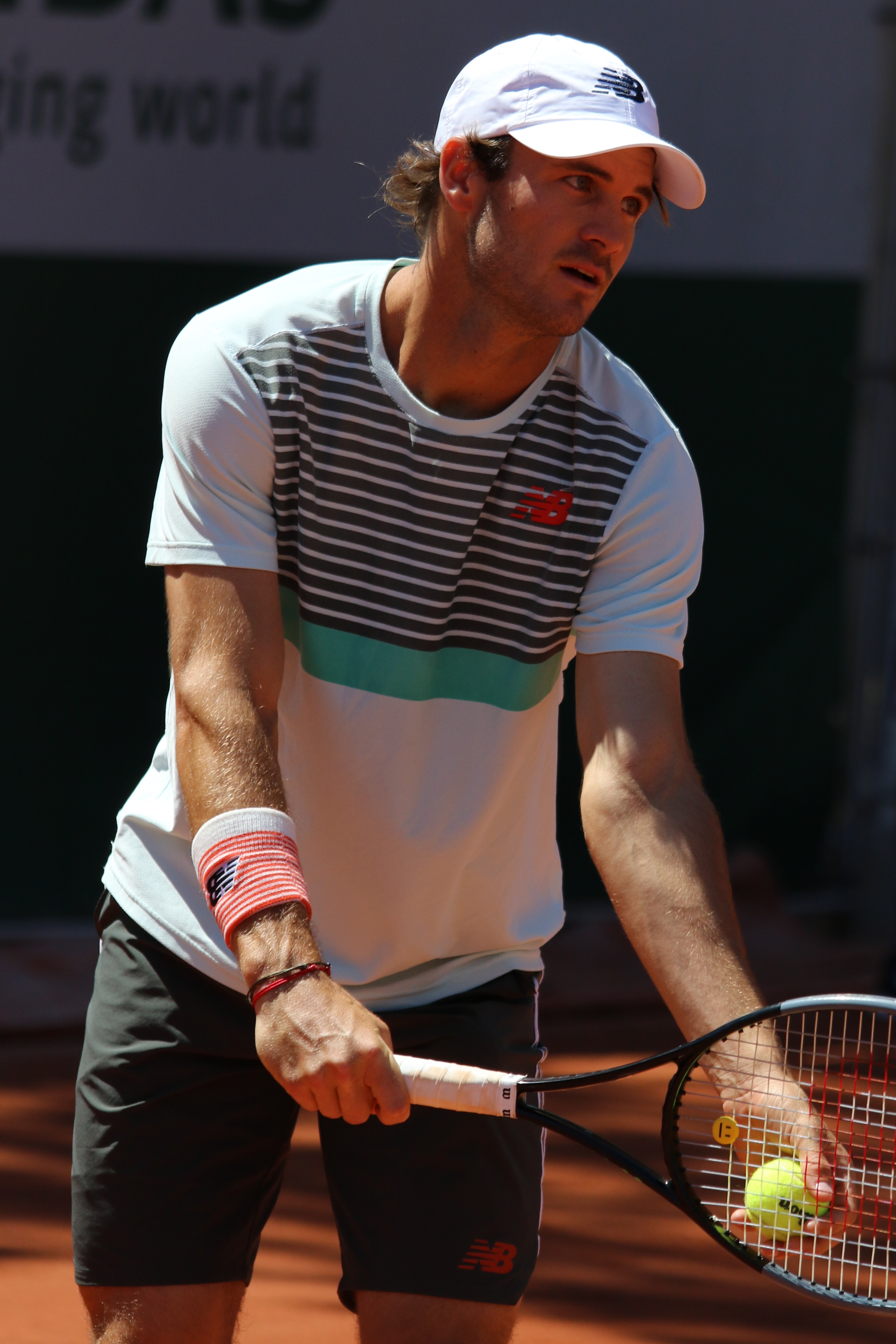
Paul

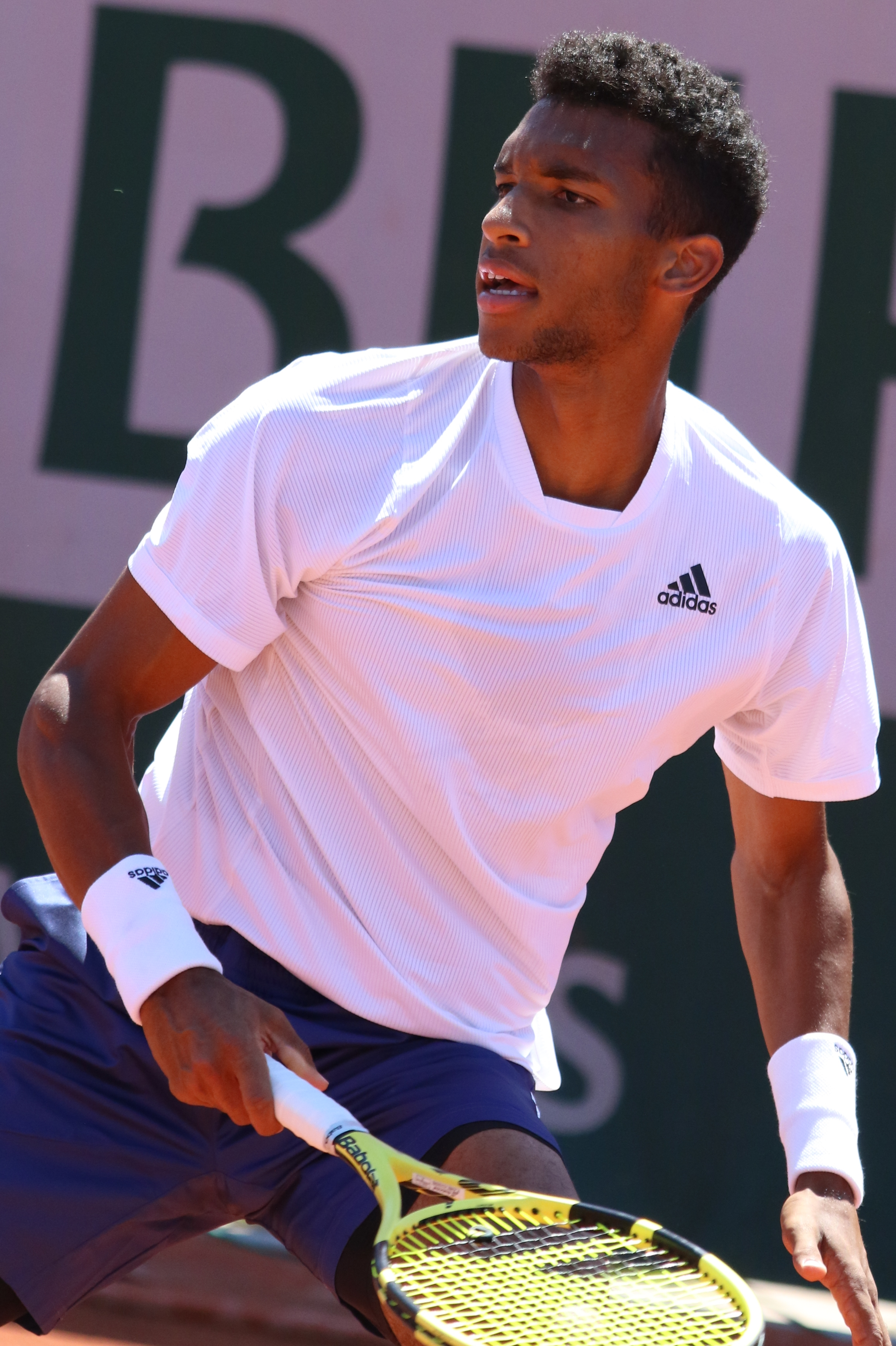
Auger-Aliassime

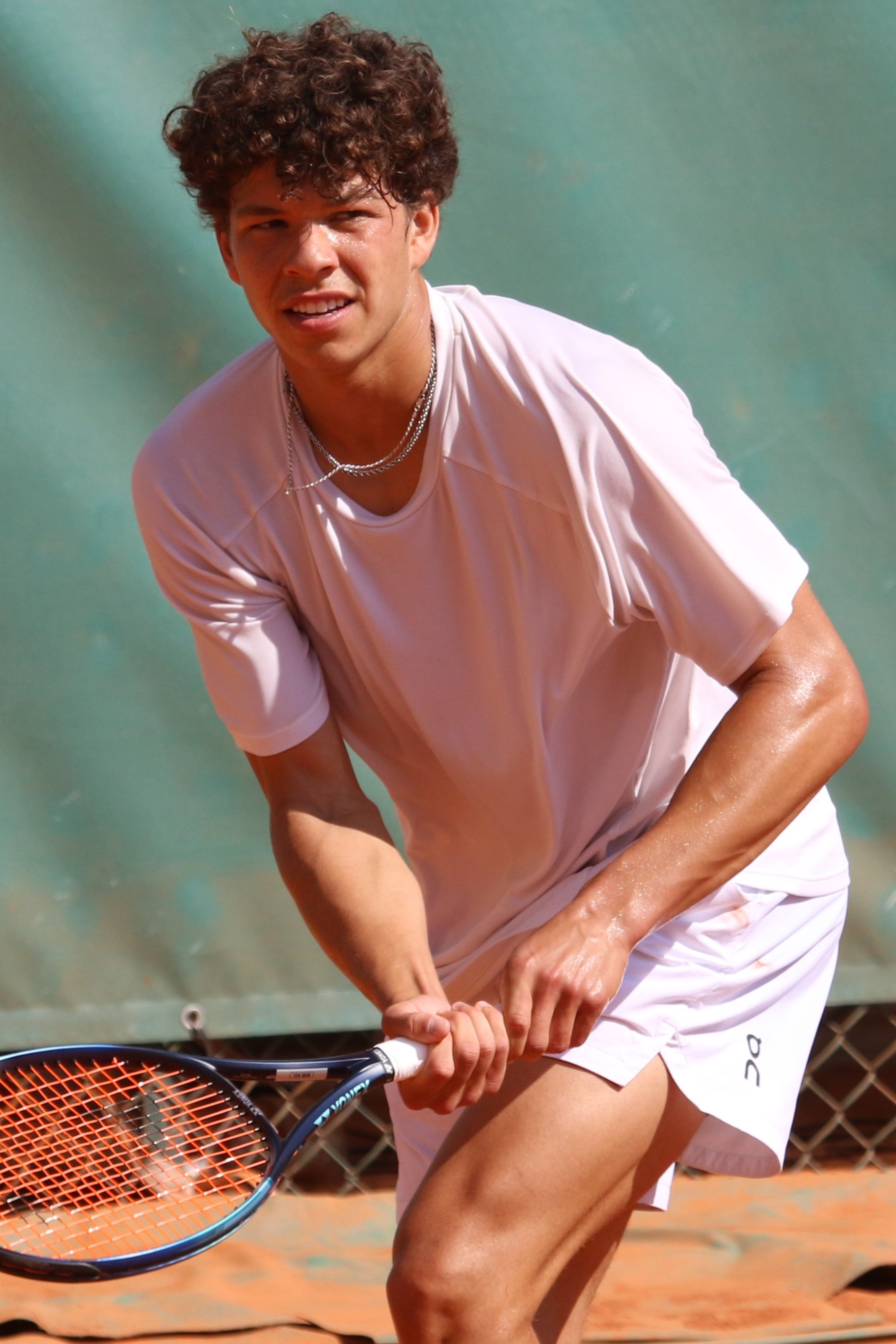
Shelton

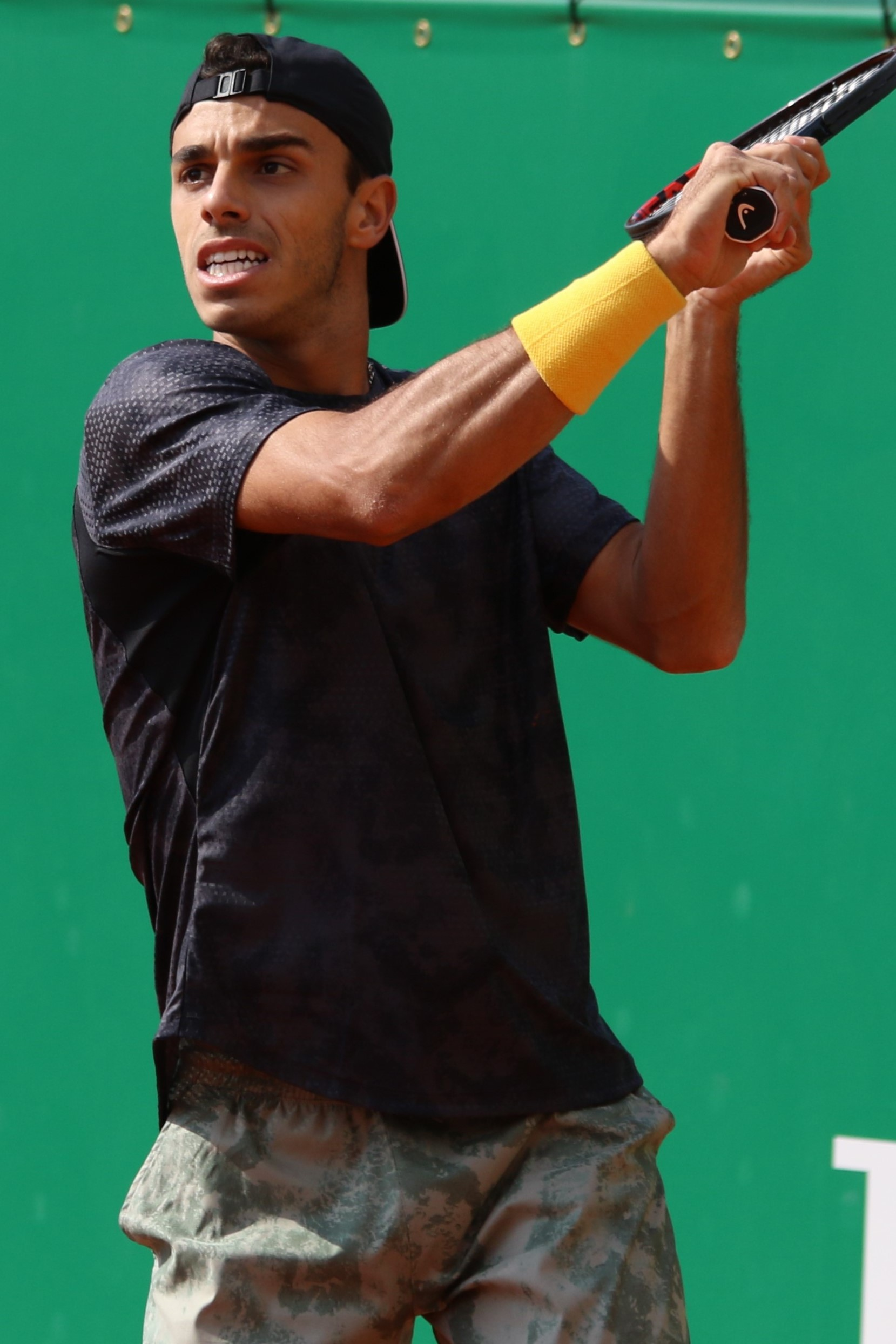
Cerúndolo

== Matches ==
Each match win on day 1 is worth one point, on day 2 two points, and on day 3 three points. The first team to 13 points will win.

| Day | Date | Match type | Team Europe | Team World | Score | Team points after match |
|---|---|---|---|---|---|---|
| 1 | 22 Sep | Singles | (France) Arthur Fils | (United States) Ben Shelton | 6–7^{(4–7)}, 1–6 | 0–1 |
| 1 | 22 Sep | Singles | (Spain) Alejandro Davidovich Fokina | (Argentina) Francisco Cerúndolo | 3–6, 5–7 | 0–2 |
| 1 | 22 Sep | Singles | (France) Gaël Monfils | (Canada) Félix Auger-Aliassime | 4–6, 3–6 | 0–3 |
| 1 | 22 Sep | Doubles | (France) A Fils / (Russia) A Rublev | (United States) T Paul / (United States) F Tiafoe | 3–6, 6–4, [6–10] | 0–4 |
| 2 | 23 Sep | Singles | (Russia) Andrey Rublev | (United States) Taylor Fritz | 2–6, 6–7^{(3–7)} | 0–6 |
| 2 | 23 Sep | Singles | (Norway) Casper Ruud | (United States) Tommy Paul | 7–6^{(8–6)}, 6–2 | 2–6 |
| 2 | 23 Sep | Singles | (Poland) Hubert Hurkacz | (United States) Frances Tiafoe | 5–7, 3–6 | 2–8 |
| 2 | 23 Sep | Doubles | (Poland) H Hurkacz / (France) G Monfils | (Canada) F Auger-Aliassime / (United States) B Shelton | 5–7, 4–6 | 2–10 |
| 3 | 24 Sep | Doubles | (Poland) H Hurkacz / (Russia) A Rublev | (United States) B Shelton / (United States) F Tiafoe | 6–7^{(4–7)}, 6–7^{(5–7)} | 2–13 |
| 3 | 24 Sep | Singles | (Norway) Casper Ruud | (United States) Taylor Fritz | not played | |
| 3 | 24 Sep | Singles | (Russia) Andrey Rublev | (United States) Frances Tiafoe | not played | |
| 3 | 24 Sep | Singles | (Poland) Hubert Hurkacz | (Canada) Félix Auger-Aliassime | not played | |

== Player statistics ==
| Player | Team | Nat | Matches | Matches win–loss | | | Points win–loss | | |
| Player | Team | Nat | Matches | Singles | Doubles | Total | Singles | Doubles | Total |
|---|---|---|---|---|---|---|---|---|---|
| Félix Auger-Aliassime | World | (Canada) | 2 | 1–0 | 1–0 | 2–0 | 1–0 | 2–0 | 3–0 |
| Francisco Cerúndolo | World | (Argentina) | 1 | 1–0 | 0–0 | 1–0 | 1–0 | 0–0 | 1–0 |
| Alejandro Davidovich Fokina | Europe | (Spain) | 1 | 0–1 | 0–0 | 0–1 | 0–1 | 0–0 | 0–1 |
| Arthur Fils | Europe | (France) | 2 | 0–1 | 0–1 | 0–2 | 0–1 | 0–1 | 0–2 |
| Taylor Fritz | World | (United States) | 1 | 1–0 | 0–0 | 1–0 | 2–0 | 0–0 | 2–0 |
| Hubert Hurkacz | Europe | (Poland) | 3 | 0–1 | 0–2 | 0–3 | 0–2 | 0–5 | 0–7 |
| Gaël Monfils | Europe | (France) | 2 | 0–1 | 0–1 | 0–2 | 0–1 | 0–2 | 0–3 |
| Tommy Paul | World | (United States) | 2 | 0–1 | 1–0 | 1–1 | 0–2 | 1–0 | 1–2 |
| Andrey Rublev | Europe | | 3 | 0–1 | 0–2 | 0–3 | 0–2 | 0–4 | 0–6 |
| Casper Ruud | Europe | (Norway) | 1 | 1–0 | 0–0 | 1–0 | 2–0 | 0–0 | 2–0 |
| Ben Shelton | World | (United States) | 3 | 1–0 | 2–0 | 3–0 | 1–0 | 5–0 | 6–0 |
| Frances Tiafoe | World | (United States) | 3 | 1–0 | 2–0 | 3–0 | 2–0 | 4–0 | 6–0 |

== Post-tournament exhibition doubles match ==
As only one match was required on Day 3 of the 2023 Laver Cup, an exhibition match was played following the trophy ceremony.

| Day | Date | Match type | Team Europe | Team World | Score |
|---|---|---|---|---|---|
| 3 | 24 Sep | Exhibition doubles | (Spain) A Davidovich Fokina / (France) A Fils | (United States) C Eubanks / (Canada) M Raonic | 3–6, 6–3, [8–10] |
