= 2021 ABN AMRO World Tennis Tournament – Singles =

Singles
- 2021 ABN AMRO World Tennis Tournament

Final
- Champion: (Russia) Andrey Rublev
- Runner-up: (Hungary) Márton Fucsovics
- Score: 7–6^{(7–4)}, 6–4

Details
- Draw: 32 (4 Q / 4 WC )
- Seeds: 8

Events
Singles	Doubles
- ABN AMRO World Tennis Tournament

Andrey Rublev defeated Márton Fucsovics in the final, 7–6^{(7–4)}, 6–4 to capture the men's singles tennis title at the 2021 Rotterdam Open. It was Rublev's fourth consecutive ATP Tour 500 victory, dating back to the 2020 Hamburg Open.

Gaël Monfils was the two-time defending champion, but chose not to defend his title.

Daniil Medvedev was in contention to become the first player outside of the Big Four to reach the world No. 2 ranking since July 24, 2005 if he reached the final. However, he lost in the first round to Dušan Lajović.

== Seeds ==
1. (Russia) Daniil Medvedev (first round)
2. (Greece) Stefanos Tsitsipas (semifinals)
3. (Germany) Alexander Zverev (first round)
4. (Russia) Andrey Rublev (champion)
5. (Spain) Roberto Bautista Agut (first round)
6. (Belgium) David Goffin (second round)
7. (Canada) Félix Auger-Aliassime (first round)
8. (Switzerland) Stan Wawrinka (first round)

== Draw ==
Key

- Q = Qualifier
- WC = Wild card
- LL = Lucky loser
- Alt = Alternate
- ITF = ITF entry
- PR = Protected ranking
- SR = Special ranking
- SE = Special exempt
- JE = Junior exempt
- JR = Junior Accelerator Programme entrant
- CO = College Accelerator Programme entrant
- NG = Next Gen Accelerator Program entrant
- w/o = Walkover
- r = Retired
- d = Defaulted

=== Finals ===
Semifinals
(Croatia) Borna Ćorić	4	1
Q	(Hungary) Márton Fucsovics	6	6
4	(Russia) Andrey Rublev	6	7^{7}
2	(Greece) Stefanos Tsitsipas	3	6^{2}

Final
Q	(Hungary) Márton Fucsovics	6^{4}	4
4	(Russia) Andrey Rublev	7^{7}	6

=== Top half ===
First round
1	(Russia) D Medvedev	6^{4}	4
(Serbia) D Lajović	7^{7}	6
(Croatia) B Ćorić	6	7^{7}
WC	(Netherlands) B van de Zandschulp	4	6^{4}
(Australia) A de Minaur	6	6
(Australia) J Millman	1	4
(Japan) K Nishikori	7^{7}	6
7	(Canada) F Auger-Aliassime	6^{4}	1
3/WC	(Germany) A Zverev	5	3
(Kazakhstan) A Bublik	7	6
(United States) T Paul	6	7^{9}
(Italy) L Sonego	4	6^{7}
Q	(Hungary) M Fucsovics	7^{7}	6^{4}	7^{7}
(United States) R Opelka	6^{2}	7^{7}	6^{4}
(Spain) A Davidovich Fokina	6	7^{7}
5	(Spain) R Bautista Agut	2	6^{3}

Second round
(Serbia) D Lajović	3	2
(Croatia) B Ćorić	6	6
(Australia) A de Minaur	3	6	5
(Japan) K Nishikori	6	2	7
(Kazakhstan) A Bublik	7^{7}	3	1
(United States) T Paul	6^{5}	6	6
Q	(Hungary) M Fucsovics	6	6
(Spain) A Davidovich Fokina	3	2

Quarterfinals
(Croatia) B Ćorić	7^{7}	7^{7}
(Japan) K Nishikori	6^{2}	6^{4}
(United States) T Paul	4	3
Q	(Hungary) M Fucsovics	6	6

Semifinals
(Croatia) B Ćorić	4	1
Q	(Hungary) M Fucsovics	6	6

=== Bottom half ===
First round
6	(Belgium) D Goffin	6	6
(Germany) J-L Struff	4	0
Q	(France) J Chardy	4	7^{7}	7^{7}
(France) U Humbert	6	6^{5}	6^{4}
WC	(Netherlands) R Haase	6	6^{2}	3
WC	(United Kingdom) A Murray	2	7^{7}	6
Q	(United States) M Giron	6^{1}	3
4	(Russia) A Rublev	7^{7}	6
8	(Switzerland) S Wawrinka	4	5
(Russia) K Khachanov	6	7
(Georgia (country)) N Basilashvili	0	3
Q	(United Kingdom) C Norrie	6	6
(Poland) H Hurkacz	6	7^{8}
(France) A Mannarino	3	6^{6}
SE	(Belarus) E Gerasimov	6^{4}	5
2	(Greece) S Tsitsipas	7^{7}	7

Second round
6	(Belgium) D Goffin	6^{3}	6^{5}
Q	(France) J Chardy	7^{7}	7^{7}
WC	(United Kingdom) A Murray	5	2
4	(Russia) A Rublev	7	6
(Russia) K Khachanov	6	6
Q	(United Kingdom) C Norrie	2	2
(Poland) H Hurkacz	4	6	5
2	(Greece) S Tsitsipas	6	4	7

Quarterfinals
Q	(France) J Chardy	6^{2}	7^{7}	4
4	(Russia) A Rublev	7^{7}	6^{2}	6
(Russia) K Khachanov	6	3	5
2	(Greece) S Tsitsipas	4	6	7

Semifinals
4	(Russia) A Rublev	6	7^{7}
2	(Greece) S Tsitsipas	3	6^{2}

== Qualifying ==
=== Seeds ===
1. (Hungary) Márton Fucsovics (qualified)
2. (France) Jérémy Chardy (qualified)
3. (United Kingdom) Cameron Norrie (qualified)
4. (United States) Marcos Giron (qualified)
5. (France) Pierre-Hugues Herbert (qualifying competition)
6. (Slovakia) Norbert Gombos (qualifying competition)
7. (Italy) Andreas Seppi (qualifying competition)
8. (France) Antoine Hoang (qualifying competition)

=== Qualifiers ===
1. (Hungary) Márton Fucsovics
2. (France) Jérémy Chardy
3. (United Kingdom) Cameron Norrie
4. (United States) Marcos Giron

=== Qualifying draw ===
==== First qualifier ====
First round
1	(Hungary) Márton Fucsovics	6	6
(France) Arthur Rinderknech	2	4
(Czech Republic) Václav Šafránek	6^{4}	2
5	(France) Pierre-Hugues Herbert	7^{7}	6

Qualifying competition
1	(Hungary) Márton Fucsovics	6	6
5	(France) Pierre-Hugues Herbert	4	3

==== Second qualifier ====
First round
2	(France) Jérémy Chardy	6	4	6
(Netherlands) Tallon Griekspoor	4	6	0
WC	(Netherlands) Ryan Nijboer	4	0
8	(France) Antoine Hoang	6	6

Qualifying competition
2	(France) Jérémy Chardy	6	5	6
8	(France) Antoine Hoang	4	7	4

==== Third qualifier ====
First round
3	(United Kingdom) Cameron Norrie	6	6
Alt	(Netherlands) Miliaan Niesten	2	0
(United States) Maxime Cressy	4	1
7	(Italy) Andreas Seppi	6	6

Qualifying competition
3	(United Kingdom) Cameron Norrie	6	6
7	(Italy) Andreas Seppi	3	2

==== Fourth qualifier ====
First round
4	(United States) Marcos Giron	6	5	6
WC	(Netherlands) Tim van Rijthoven	2	7	4
WC	(Netherlands) Jelle Sels	3	6^{2}
6	(Slovakia) Norbert Gombos	6	7^{7}

Qualifying competition
4	(United States) Marcos Giron	6	6
6	(Slovakia) Norbert Gombos	3	4
