= UTS 9 =

2024 tennis tournament

The ninth edition of the tournament, the first of 2024, took place from 9 February to 11 February at the Telenor Arena in Oslo.

"The Viking" Holger Rune and "Thieminho" Dominic Thiem withdrew after the first day due to illness. Thiem got replaced by Norway's top junior "The Junior" Nicolai Budkov Kjær.

"La Monf" Gaël Monfils got disqualified due to a code of conduct violation after his first match stemming from an incident in the locker room, which resulted in a minor injury to the supervisor. He got replaced by "The French Flair" Lucas Pouille.

== Groups ==
=== Group A ===
- "The Ice Man", Casper Ruud
- "The Viking", Holger Rune
- "The Bublik Enemy", Alexander Bublik
- "Thieminho", Dominic Thiem
- "The Junior", Nicolai Budkov Kjær

=== Group B ===
- "Rublo", Andrey Rublev
- "The Demon", Alex de Minaur
- "La Monf", Gaël Monfils
- "The Rebel", Benoît Paire
- "The French Flair", Lucas Pouille

== Group Stage ==
=== Group A ===
	"The Ice Man" (Norway) Ruud	"The Viking" (Denmark) Rune	"The Bublik Enemy" (Kazakhstan) Bublik	"Thieminho" (Austria) Thiem "The Junior" (Norway) Budkov Kjær	RR; W–L	Quarter; W–L	Point; W–L	Standings
"The Ice Man" (Norway) Casper Ruud		6-21, 14-13, 17-12, 13-12	18-12, 19-8, 10-18, 12-15, [2-0]	16-9, 14-13, 14-13 (w/ Budkov Kjær)	3-0	9–3 (75%)	155–146 (51%)	1
"The Viking" (Denmark) Holger Rune	21-6, 13-14, 12-17, 12-13		0-15, 0-15, 0-15 (w.o.)	16-8, 11-14, 13-10, 11-13, [2-1] (w/ Thiem)	1-2	4–8 (33%)	111–141 (44%)	3
"The Bublik Enemy" (Kazakhstan) Alexander Bublik	12-18, 8-19, 18-10, 15-12, [0-2]	15-0, 15-0, 15-0 (w.o.)		16-13, 17-14, 16-17, 13-12 (w/ Thiem)	2-1	8–4 (67%)	160–117 (58%)	2
"Thieminho" (Austria) Dominic Thiem "The Junior" (Norway) Nicolai Budkov Kjær	9-16, 13-14, 13-14 (w/ Budkov Kjær)	8-16, 14-11, 10-13, 13-11, [1-2] (w/ Thiem)	13-16, 14-17, 17-16, 12-13 (w/ Thiem)		0–2; 0–1	3–6 (33%); 0–3 (0%)	102–115 (47%); 35–44 (44%)	4; 5

=== Group B ===
	"Rublo"; Rublev	"The Demon" (Australia) de Minaur	"The Rebel" (France) Paire	"La Monf" (France) Monfils "The French Flair" (France) Pouille	RR; W–L	Quarter; W–L	Point; W–L	Standings
"Rublo"; Andrey Rublev		13-15, 18-10, 17-14, 17-12	20-12, 20-14, 22-16	18-14, 15-18, 20-9, 17-11 (w/ Pouille)	3-0	9–2 (82%)	197–145 (58%)	1
"The Demon" (Australia) Alex de Minaur	15-13, 10-18, 14-17, 12-17		15-19, 15-16, 19-11, 14-13, [2-0]	15-12, 17-8, 16-9 (w/ Monfils)	2-1	7–3 (70%)	164–153 (52%)	2
"The Rebel" (France) Benoît Paire	12-20, 14-20, 16-22	19-15, 16-15, 11-19, 13-14, [0-2]		20-13, 15-18, 16-18, 23-15, [2-1] (w/ Pouille)	1-2	5–8 (38%)	177–192 (48%)	3
"La Monf" (France) Gaël Monfils "The French Flair" (France) Lucas Pouille	14-18, 18-15, 9-20, 11-17 (w/ Pouille)	12-15, 8-17, 9-16 (w/ Monfils)	13-20, 18-15, 18-16, 15-23, [1-2] (w/ Pouille)		0–1; 0–2	0–3 (0%); 3–6 (33%)	29–48 (38%); 117–146 (44%)	5; 4

== Finals ==
Semifinals
(Norway) Casper Ruud "The Ice Man"	9	9	10
(Australia) Alex de Minaur "The Demon"	15	17	14
Andrey Rublev "Rublo"	25	25	26
(Kazakhstan) Alexander Bublik "The Bublik Enemy"	11	12	11

Final
(Australia) Alex de Minaur "The Demon"	16	10	13	12
Andrey Rublev "Rublo"	14	17	16	20
