= UTS 6 =

The sixth edition of the tournament, the second of 2023 and known as UTS Frankfurt, took place from 15 September to 17 September at the Süwag Energie Arena in Frankfurt. It was the second in a series of three events in 2023 leading up to the "Grand Final" in December 2023.

== Groups ==
Group placements were announced on 3 August 2023.

=== Group A ===
- "G-Unit", Grigor Dimitrov (Note: Dimitrov replaced "The Chessmaster" (Daniil Medvedev) after Medvedev withdrew due to fatigue.) (Note: Dimitrov changed his nickname to "G-Unit" after formerly bearing the nickname of "Grigor" in his first UTS appearance in UTS 2.)
- "The Thunder", Jan-Lennard Struff (Note: Struff replaced "The King" (Nick Kyrgios) after Kyrgios withdrew due to injury.)
- "The Iceman", Casper Ruud (Note: Ruud replaced "The Bot" (Reilly Opelka) after Opelka withdrew due to injury.)
- "The Rebel", Benoît Paire

=== Group B ===
- "Rublo", Andrey Rublev
- "El Peque", Diego Schwartzman
- "La Monf", Gaël Monfils
- "The Rocket", Christopher Eubanks

== Group Stage ==
=== Group A ===
	"G-Unit" (Bulgaria) Dimitrov	"The Thunder" (Germany) Struff	"The Iceman" (Norway) Ruud	"The Rebel" (France) Paire	RR; W–L	Quarter; W–L	Point; W–L	Standings
"G-Unit" (Bulgaria) Grigor Dimitrov		14–17, 18–11, 17–9, 14–13	9–15, 15–18, 17–11, 13–10, [0–2]	11–17, 11–16, 15–14, 19–15, [4–3]	2–1	9–5 (64%)	177–171 (51%)	2
"The Thunder" (Germany) Jan-Lennard Struff	17–14, 11–18, 9–17, 13–14		6–22, 13–12, 8–17, 11–16	13–16, 16–17, 14–16	0–3	2–9 (18%)	131–179 (42%)	4
"The Iceman" (Norway) Casper Ruud	15–9, 18–15, 11–17, 10–13, [2–0]	22–6, 12–13, 17–8, 16–11		9–14, 12–13, 19–15, 12–13	2–1	7–6 (54%)	175–147 (54%)	3
"The Rebel" (France) Benoît Paire	17–11, 16–11, 14–15, 15–19, [3–4]	16–13, 17–16, 16–14	14–9, 13–12, 5–19, 13–12		2–1	8–4 (67%)	159–155 (51%)	1

=== Group B ===
	"Rublo"; Rublev	"El Peque" (Argentina) Schwartzman	"La Monf" (France) Monfils	"The Rocket" (United States) Eubanks	RR; W–L	Quarter; W–L	Point; W–L	Standings
"Rublo"; Andrey Rublev		10–14, 13–16, 16–7, 8–16	19–11, 16–14, 12–13, 13–12	18–12, 18–12, 20–15	2–1	7–4 (64%)	163–142 (53%)	2
"El Peque" (Argentina) Diego Schwartzman	14–10, 16–13, 7–16, 16–8		18–9, 24–5, 16–13	15–12, 19–12, 22–11	3–0	9–1 (90%)	167–109 (61%)	1
"La Monf" (France) Gaël Monfils	11–19, 14–16, 13–12, 12–13	9–18, 5–24, 13–16		19–16, 13–15, 14–15, 11–20	0–3	2–9 (18%)	137–184 (43%)	4
"The Rocket" (United States) Christopher Eubanks	12–18, 12–18, 15–20	12–15, 12–19, 11–22	16–19, 15–13, 15–14, 20–11		1–2	3–7 (30%)	140–169 (45%)	3

== Finals ==
Semifinals
(Argentina) Diego Schwartzman "El Peque"	9	9	21	22	0
(Bulgaria) Grigor Dimitrov "G-Unit"	15	14	7	4	2
(France) Benoît Paire "The Rebel"	8	13	13
Andrey Rublev "Rublo"	21	14	17

Final
(Bulgaria) Grigor Dimitrov "G-Unit"	13	17	10	16
Andrey Rublev "Rublo"	14	12	11	17
