= UTS 10 =

The tenth edition of the tournament, the second of 2024, took place from 22 August to 23 August at Forest Hills Stadium in New York.

Rather than a group stage into a top 4 stage, the event featured a standard singles bracket with 8 players.

== Seeds ==
1. (Australia) "The Demon", Alex de Minaur (semifinals)
2. (Norway) "The Ice Man", Casper Ruud (quarterfinals)
3. "Rublo", Andrey Rublev (quarterfinals)
4. (Greece) "El Greco", Stefanos Tsitsipas (Note: Tsitsipas replaced "The King" (Nick Kyrgios) after Kyrgios withdrew from semifinals due to injury.) (semifinals)

=== Other Players ===
- (Kazakhstan) "The Bublik Enemy", Alexander Bublik (final)
- (France) "La Monf", Gaël Monfils (champion)
- (Canada) "Shapo", Denis Shapovalov (quarterfinals)
- (Australia) "King Kyrgios", Nick Kyrgios (semifinals, withdrew)

== Finals ==
Quarterfinals
1	(Australia) Alex de Minaur "The Demon"	17	19	19
(Canada) Denis Shapovalov "Shapo"	16	13	13
4	(Greece) Stefanos Tsitsipas "El Greco"	12	17	17	21	[3]
(Kazakhstan) Alexander Bublik "The Bublik Enemy"	20	11	18	10	[5]
3	Andrey Rublev "Rublo"	12	10	14
(France) Gaël Monfils "La Monf"	19	15	18
2	(Norway) Casper Ruud "The Ice Man"	8	9	11
(Australia) Nick Kyrgios "King Kyrgios"	17	21	15

Final Four
1	(Australia) Alex de Minaur "The Demon"	12	16	14	11
(Kazakhstan) Alexander Bublik "The Bublik Enemy"	19	13	16	18
(France) Gaël Monfils "La Monf"	17	15	16	15	[2]
4	(Greece) Stefanos Tsitsipas "El Greco"	12	18	14	18	[0]

Final
(Kazakhstan) Alexander Bublik "The Bublik Enemy"	20	12	14	14
(France) Gaël Monfils "La Monf"	10	17	17	15
