= UTS 8 =

2023 tennis tournament

UTS hosted its inaugural Grand Final from 15 December to 17 December 2023 following the conclusion of all three global events held throughout the year. Each champion from UTS 5, UTS 6, and UTS 7 automatically qualified for the tournament.

== Groups ==
=== Group A ===
- "Rublo", Andrey Rublev
- "The Ice Man", Casper Ruud
- "El Peque", Diego Schwartzman
- "The Rebel", Benoît Paire

=== Group B ===
- "The Viking", Holger Rune
- "The Bublik Enemy", Alexander Bublik
- "The Power", Jack Draper
- "La Monf", Gaël Monfils

== Group Stage ==
=== Group A ===
	"Rublo"; Rublev	"The Ice Man" (Norway) Ruud	"El Peque" (Argentina) Schwartzman	"The Rebel" (France) Paire	RR; W–L	Quarter; W–L	Point; W–L	Standings
"Rublo"; Andrey Rublev		12–14, 19–8, 18–12, 18–9	15–13, 12–13, 13–12, 10–16, [4–2]	26–10, 16–13, 19–12	3–0	9–3 (75%)	182–134 (58%)	1
"The Ice Man" (Norway) Casper Ruud	14–12, 8–19, 12–18, 9–18		16–10, 7–16, 13–12, 17–8	17–12, 18–9, 16–10	2–1	7–4 (64%)	147–144 (51%)	2
"El Peque" (Argentina) Diego Schwartzman	13–15, 13–12, 12–13, 16–10, [2–4]	10–16, 16–7, 12–13, 8–17		11–17, 14–13, 21–10, 16–17, [5–4]	1–2	6–8 (43%)	169–168 (50%)	3
"The Rebel" (France) Benoît Paire	10–26, 13–16, 12–19	12–17, 9–18, 10–16	17–11, 13–14, 10–21, 17–16, [4–5]		0–3	2–9 (18%)	117–179 (40%)	4

=== Group B ===
	"The Viking" (Denmark) Rune	"The Bublik Enemy" (Kazakhstan) Bublik	"The Power" (United Kingdom) Draper	"La Monf" (France) Monfils	RR; W–L	Quarter; W–L	Point; W–L	Standings
"The Viking" (Denmark) Holger Rune		15–11, 12–18, 12–19, 15–14, [2–1]	8–16, 7–16, 11–17	17–9, 15–14, 9–19, 16–13	2–1	6–6 (50%)	139–167 (45%)	2
"The Bublik Enemy" (Kazakhstan) Alexander Bublik	11–15, 18–12, 19–12, 14–15, [1–2]		11–12, 15–13, 12–13, 10–13	12–14, 16–10, 7–16, 13–20	0–3	4–9 (31%)	159–167 (49%)	4
"The Power" (United Kingdom) Jack Draper	16–8, 16–7, 17–11	12–11, 13–15, 13–12, 13–10		10–0, 10–0, 10–0	3–0	9–1 (90%)	130–74 (64%)	1
"La Monf" (France) Gaël Monfils	9–17, 14–15, 19–9, 13–16	14–12, 10–16, 16–7, 20–13	0–10, 0–10, 0–10		1–2	4–7 (36%)	114–135 (46%)	3

== Finals ==
Semifinals
Andrey Rublev "Rublo"	10	11	11
(Denmark) Holger Rune "The Viking"	20	12	16
(United Kingdom) Jack Draper "The Power"	14	12	14
(Norway) Casper Ruud "The Iceman"	13	11	13

Final
(Denmark) Holger Rune "The Viking"	14	12	10	7
(United Kingdom) Jack Draper "The Power"	12	15	13	19
