= 2021 BNP Paribas Open =

- Date: October 6–17
- Edition: 47th (ATP) / 32nd (WTA)
- Category: ATP Tour Masters 1000 (Men); WTA 1000 (Women)
- Draw: 96S / 32D
- Surface: Hard
- Location: Indian Wells, California, United States
- Venue: Indian Wells Tennis Garden

Champions

Men's singles
- (United Kingdom) Cameron Norrie

Women's singles
- (Spain) Paula Badosa

Men's doubles
- (Australia) John Peers / (Slovakia) Filip Polášek

Women's doubles
- (Chinese Taipei) Hsieh Su-wei / (Belgium) Elise Mertens
← 2019 ·	Indian Wells Open	· 2022 →

The 2021 Indian Wells Open (also known as the BNP Paribas Open for sponsorship reasons) was a professional men's and women's tennis tournament played in Indian Wells, California. After the event was cancelled the preceding year amid the beginning of the COVID-19 pandemic, the event was initially scheduled to take place on March 10–21, 2021, but was postponed to October 6–17, 2021 to accommodate logistics disruptions owing to the pandemic.

It was the 47th edition of the men's event and 32nd of the women's event, and was classified as an ATP Tour Masters 1000 event on the 2021 ATP Tour and a WTA 1000 event on the 2021 WTA Tour. Both the men's and the women's qualifying and main draw events took place at the Indian Wells Tennis Garden from October 4 through October 17, 2021 on outdoor hard courts.

Dominic Thiem was the defending men's singles champion from when the tournament was last held in 2019. However, after Thiem ended his season early due to an ongoing wrist injury, he withdrew from the tournament. Cameron Norrie won the men's singles title to become the first British man to win the Indian Wells Masters and earn his first ATP Masters 1000 title. Bianca Andreescu was the defending women's singles champion from 2019, but she lost in the third round to Anett Kontaveit. Paula Badosa won the women's singles title to become the first Spanish woman to win the Indian Wells Masters and earn her first WTA 1000 title.

The teams of Nikola Mektić and Horacio Zeballos and Elise Mertens and Aryna Sabalenka were the defending champions in the men's and women's doubles draws, respectively. Mektić and Zeballos chose not to participate together. Mektić played alongside partner Mate Pavić as the top seeds, but the pair lost in the quarterfinals. Zeballos played alongside partner Marcel Granollers, but were eliminated in the first round. Sabalenka chose not to defend her title and Mertens entered alongside partner Hsieh Su-wei. Mertens successfully defended her title with Hsieh, making it Mertens' second and Hsieh's third Indian Wells title, respectively.

== Champions ==
=== Men's singles ===
- (United Kingdom) Cameron Norrie def. (Georgia (country)) Nikoloz Basilashvili, 3–6, 6–4, 6–1

=== Women's singles ===
- (Spain) Paula Badosa def. (Belarus) Victoria Azarenka, 7–6^{(7–5)}, 2–6, 7–6^{(7–2)}

This was Badosa's second WTA Tour singles title, and first at the WTA 1000 level.

=== Men's doubles ===
- (Australia) John Peers / (Slovakia) Filip Polášek def. (Russia) Aslan Karatsev / (Russia) Andrey Rublev, 6–3, 7–6^{(7–5)}

=== Women's doubles ===
- (Chinese Taipei) Hsieh Su-wei / (Belgium) Elise Mertens def. (Russia) Veronika Kudermetova / (Kazakhstan) Elena Rybakina, 7–6^{(7–1)}, 6–3

== Points and prize money ==
=== Point distribution ===
Event	W	F	SF	QF	R16	R32	R64	R128	Q	Q2	Q1
Men's singles	1000	600	360	180	90	45	25*	10	16	8	0
Men's doubles	1000	600	360	180	90	0	—	—	—	—	—
Women's singles	1000	650	390	215	120	65	35*	10	30	20	2
Women's doubles	1000	650	390	215	120	10	—	—	—	—	—

=== Prize money ===
Event	W	F	SF	QF	R16	R32	R64	R128	Q2	Q1
Men's singles	$1,209,730	$640,000	$335,000	$175,000	$92,000	$51,895	$29,045	$18,155	$9,110	$4,785
Women's singles	$1,209,730	$640,000	$335,000	$175,000	$92,000	$51,895	$29,045	$18,155	$9,110	$4,785
Men's doubles*	$414,500	$220,000	$117,240	$59,740	$31,500	$16,870	—	—	—	—
Women's doubles*	$414,500	$220,000	$117,240	$59,740	$31,500	$16,870	—	—	—	—

- per team

== ATP singles main-draw entrants ==
=== Seeds ===
The following are the seeded players. Seedings are based on ATP rankings as of October 4, 2021. Rank and points before are as of October 4, 2021.

As a result of pandemic-related adjustments to the ranking system, players are defending their points from the 2019 tournament (which had already been reduced by 50%), as well as from tournaments held during the weeks of 7 and 14 October 2019 (Shanghai, Stockholm, Antwerp and/or Moscow) and 12 October 2020 (St. Petersburg, Cologne or Sardinia). Points from 2019 and 2020 tournaments are included in the table only if they counted towards the player's ranking as of October 4, 2021.

Seed	Rank	Player	Points before	Points dropped from 2019 and/or 2020	Points won	Points after	Status
1	2	(Russia) Daniil Medvedev	10,575	1,000+45	90+10	9,630	Fourth round, lost to (Bulgaria) Grigor Dimitrov [23]
2	3	(Greece) Stefanos Tsitsipas	8,175	360	180	7,995	Quarterfinals, lost to (Georgia (country)) Nikoloz Basilashvili [29]
3	4	(Germany) Alexander Zverev	7,603	23+600+250	180+10+10	6,930	Quarterfinals lost to (United States) Taylor Fritz [31]
4	5	(Russia) Andrey Rublev	6,130	90+250+500	45+90+90	5,560^{^}	Third round, lost to (United States) Tommy Paul
5	7	(Italy) Matteo Berrettini	5,173	360	45	4,858	Third round, lost to (United States) Taylor Fritz [31]
6	10	(Norway) Casper Ruud	3,615	(90)^{†}	90	3,615	Fourth round, lost to (Argentina) Diego Schwartzman [11]
7	11	(Canada) Félix Auger-Aliassime	3,368	45+150	10+45	3,263^{^}	Second round, lost to (Spain) Albert Ramos Viñolas
8	12	(Poland) Hubert Hurkacz	3,333	90+90	180+45	3,378	Quarterfinals, lost to (Bulgaria) Grigor Dimitrov [23]
9	13	(Canada) Denis Shapovalov	3,265	45+250+180	45+45+23	2,903	Third round, lost to (Russia) Aslan Karatsev [19]
10	14	(Italy) Jannik Sinner	3,100	90	90	3,100	Fourth round, lost to (United States) Taylor Fritz [31]
11	15	(Argentina) Diego Schwartzman	2,800	10	180	2,970	Quarterfinals, lost to (United Kingdom) Cameron Norrie [21]
12	16	(Spain) Pablo Carreño Busta	2,550	70+90	45+10	2,445	Third round, lost to (Russia) Karen Khachanov [24]
13	17	(Chile) Cristian Garín	2,510	45	45	2,510	Third round, lost to (Australia) Alex de Minaur [22]
14	18	(France) Gaël Monfils	2,418	90+45	90+10	2,383	Fourth round, lost to (Germany) Alexander Zverev [3]
15	19	(Spain) Roberto Bautista Agut	2,360	90+90	45+45	2,270	Third round, lost to (United Kingdom) Cameron Norrie [21]
16	20	(United States) Reilly Opelka	2,161	45+90	45+0	2,071	Third round, lost to (Bulgaria) Grigor Dimitrov [23]
17	21	(Italy) Lorenzo Sonego	2,122	10	10	2,125^{^}	Second round, lost to (South Africa) Kevin Anderson
18	22	(United Kingdom) Daniel Evans	2,122	(23)^{†}	45	2,144	Third round, lost to (Argentina) Diego Schwartzman [11]
19	23	(Russia) Aslan Karatsev	2,109	45	90	2,154	Fourth round, lost to (Poland) Hubert Hurkacz [8]
20	24	(United States) John Isner	2,091	45+90	45+0	2,001	Third round, withdrew
21	26	(United Kingdom) Cameron Norrie	2,015	70+90	1,000+40	2,895	Champion, defeated (Georgia (country)) Nikoloz Basilashvili [29]
22	27	(Australia) Alex de Minaur	1,991	10	90	2,071	Fourth round, lost to (Greece) Stefanos Tsitsipas [2]
23	28	(Bulgaria) Grigor Dimitrov	1,881	(10)^{†}	360	2,231	Semifinals, lost to (United Kingdom) Cameron Norrie [21]
24	29	(Russia) Karen Khachanov	1,830	90+90+90	90+45+23	1,718	Fourth round, lost to (Georgia (country)) Nikoloz Basilashvili [29]
25	30	(Italy) Fabio Fognini	1,664	180	45	1,529	Third round, lost to (Greece) Stefanos Tsitsipas [2]
26	31	(South Africa) Lloyd Harris	1,652	57	45	1,640	Third round, lost to (Norway) Casper Ruud [6]
27	34	(Serbia) Filip Krajinović	1,589	53+10+150	45+28+23	1,472	Third round, lost to (Russia) Daniil Medvedev [1]
28	35	(Serbia) Dušan Lajović	1,565	10+45	10+23	1,556^{^}	Second round, lost to (United States) Tommy Paul
29	36	(Georgia (country)) Nikoloz Basilashvili	1,556	90	600	2,066	Runner-up, lost to (United Kingdom) Cameron Norrie [21]
30	38	(Spain) Carlos Alcaraz	1,499	80+80	10+6	1,355	Second round, lost to (United Kingdom) Andy Murray [WC]
31	39	(United States) Taylor Fritz	1,495	45	360	1,810	Semifinals vs (Georgia (country)) Nikoloz Basilashvili [29]
32	40	(United States) Sebastian Korda	1,469	(10)^{†}	10	1,469	Second round, lost to (United States) Frances Tiafoe

† The player is not defending points from either 2019 or 2020. Accordingly, his 19th best result is shown in this column instead.
^ Because the 2021 tournament is non-mandatory, the player substituted his 19th best result in place of the points won in this tournament.

=== Other entrants ===
The following players received wildcards into the singles main draw:

- (United Kingdom) Andy Murray
- (Denmark) Holger Rune
- (United States) Jack Sock
- (United States) Zachary Svajda
- (United States) J. J. Wolf

The following player received entry using a protected ranking into the singles main draw:

- (Germany) Philipp Kohlschreiber

The following players received entry from the qualifying draw:

- (Italy) Salvatore Caruso
- (United States) Maxime Cressy
- (United States) Ernesto Escobedo
- (United States) Christopher Eubanks
- (Ecuador) Emilio Gómez
- (Turkey) Cem İlkel
- (Italy) Roberto Marcora
- (Argentina) Renzo Olivo
- (Portugal) João Sousa
- (Chile) Alejandro Tabilo
- (Netherlands) Botic van de Zandschulp
- (Australia) Aleksandar Vukic

=== Withdrawals ===
Before the tournament

- (Slovenia) Aljaž Bedene → replaced by (Germany) Daniel Altmaier
- (Kazakhstan) Alexander Bublik → replaced by (Spain) Carlos Taberner
- (France) Jérémy Chardy → replaced by (Brazil) Thiago Monteiro
- (Croatia) Marin Čilić → replaced by (United States) Jenson Brooksby
- (Croatia) Borna Ćorić → replaced by (Argentina) Guido Pella
- (Uruguay) Pablo Cuevas → replaced by (Spain) Roberto Carballés Baena
- (Serbia) Novak Djokovic → replaced by (Spain) Feliciano López
- (Switzerland) Roger Federer → replaced by (Germany) Philipp Kohlschreiber
- (Belgium) David Goffin → replaced by (Belarus) Egor Gerasimov
- (France) Ugo Humbert → replaced by (United States) Steve Johnson
- (Belarus) Ilya Ivashka → replaced by (Colombia) Daniel Elahi Galán
- (Spain) Rafael Nadal → replaced by (United States) Brandon Nakashima
- (Canada) Milos Raonic → replaced by (United States) Denis Kudla
- (Austria) Dominic Thiem → replaced by (Argentina) Facundo Bagnis
- (Switzerland) Stan Wawrinka → replaced by (United States) Tennys Sandgren
- (Sweden) Mikael Ymer → replaced by (Japan) Taro Daniel

During the tournament

- (United States) John Isner

== ATP doubles main-draw entrants ==
=== Seeds ===
Country	Player	Country	Player	Rank	Seed
CRO	Nikola Mektić	CRO	Mate Pavić	1	1
USA	Rajeev Ram	GBR	Joe Salisbury	2	2
ESP	Marcel Granollers	ARG	Horacio Zeballos	3	3
COL	Juan Sebastián Cabal	COL	Robert Farah	13	4
GER	Kevin Krawietz	ROU	Horia Tecău	20	5
GBR	Jamie Murray	BRA	Bruno Soares	19	6
AUS	John Peers	SVK	Filip Polášek	8	7
CRO	Ivan Dodig	BRA	Marcelo Melo	30	8

- Rankings are as of October 4, 2021.

=== Other entrants ===
The following pairs received wildcards into the doubles main draw:

- (United States) John Isner / (United States) Jack Sock
- (United States) Steve Johnson / (United States) Sam Querrey
- (United States) Mackenzie McDonald / (United States) Brandon Nakashima

The following pair received entry as alternates:

- (Serbia) Filip Krajinović / (Serbia) Dušan Lajović

=== Withdrawals ===
Before the tournament

- (Italy) Matteo Berrettini / (Italy) Jannik Sinner → replaced by (Serbia) Filip Krajinović / (Serbia) Dušan Lajović
- (Brazil) Marcelo Demoliner / (Russia) Daniil Medvedev → replaced by (Chile) Cristian Garín / (Mexico) Santiago González

During the tournament

- (United States) John Isner / (United States) Jack Sock

== WTA singles main-draw entrants ==
=== Seeds ===
The following are the seeded players. Seedings are based on WTA rankings as of September 27, 2021. Rankings and points before are as of October 4, 2021.

As a result of pandemic-related adjustments to the ranking system and changes to the WTA Tour calendar in 2020 and 2021, players will have the following potential adjustments to their ranking points after the tournament:

- players who have points from the 2020 French Open counting towards their ranking on October 4, 2021, will have those points replaced by points from the 2021 French Open;
- players will be dropping points from tournaments held during the weeks of 7 and 14 October 2019 (Tianjin, Linz, Moscow and Luxembourg); and
- players who are not defending points from October 2019 will have their 16th best result replaced by their points from the 2021 Indian Wells tournament.

Points from the 2019 Indian Wells tournament will be dropped on November 8, 2021.

Seed	Rank	Player	Points before	2020 French Open Points^{†}	2021 French Open Points^{†}	Points dropped from 2019 (or 16th best result)	Points won	Points after	Status
1	3	(Czech Republic) Karolína Plíšková	5,285	-	-	30	65	5,320	Third round, lost to (Brazil) Beatriz Haddad Maia [LL]
2	4	(Poland) Iga Świątek	4,756	2,000	430	0	120	3,306	Fourth round, lost to (Latvia) Jeļena Ostapenko [24]
3	5	(Czech Republic) Barbora Krejčíková	4,668	-	-	40	120	4,748	Fourth round, lost to (Spain) Paula Badosa [21]
4	7	(Ukraine) Elina Svitolina	4,376	430	130	100	120	4,096	Fourth round, lost to (United States) Jessica Pegula [19]
5	6	(Spain) Garbiñe Muguruza	4,595	130	10	60	10	4,425	Second round, lost to (Australia) Ajla Tomljanović
6	9	(Greece) Maria Sakkari	4,055	-	-	60	10	4,005	Second round, lost to (Switzerland) Viktorija Golubic
7	11	(Czech Republic) Petra Kvitová	3,735	780	70	55	65	3,035	Third round, lost to (Belarus) Victoria Azarenka [27]
8	10	(Switzerland) ~~Belinda Bencic~~	3,835	-	-	470	0	3,365	Withdrew due to knee injury
9	13	(Russia) Anastasia Pavlyuchenkova	3,255	-	-	305+30	65+1	2,986	Third round, lost to (Canada) Leylah Fernandez [23]
10	15	(Germany) Angelique Kerber	3,105	-	-	55	215	3,265	Quarterfinals, lost to (Spain) Paula Badosa [21]
11	17	(Romania) Simona Halep	2,982	240	0	0	65	2,807	Third round, lost to (Belarus) Aliaksandra Sasnovich
12	14	(Tunisia) Ons Jabeur	3,220	-	-	110	390	3,500	Semifinals, lost to (Spain) Paula Badosa [21]
13	16	(Kazakhstan) Elena Rybakina	2,983	-	-	110	10	2,883	Second round, lost to (Kazakhstan) Yulia Putintseva
14	18	(Belgium) Elise Mertens	2,885	-	-	60	10	2,835	Second round, lost to (Italy) Jasmine Paolini [LL]
15	19	(United States) Coco Gauff	2,815	-	-	280	65	2,600	Third round, lost to (Spain) Paula Badosa [21]
16	21	(Canada) Bianca Andreescu	2,563	-	-	0	65	2,628	Third round, lost to (Estonia) Anett Kontaveit [18]
17	22	(United Kingdom) Emma Raducanu	2,558	-	-	0	10	2,568	Second round, lost to (Belarus) Aliaksandra Sasnovich
18	20	(Estonia) Anett Kontaveit	2,616	-	-	65	215	2,766	Quarterfinals, lost to (Tunisia) Ons Jabeur [12]
19	24	(United States) Jessica Pegula	2,470	-	-	35	215	2,650	Quarterfinals, lost to (Belarus) Victoria Azarenka [27]
20	30	(Russia) Daria Kasatkina	2,195	-	-	55	65	2,205	Third round, lost to (Germany) Angelique Kerber [10]
21	27	(Spain) Paula Badosa	2,298	-	-	50	1,000	3,248	Champion, defeated (Belarus) Victoria Azarenka [27]
22	25	(United States) Danielle Collins	2,361	430	130	100	65	2,026	Third round, lost to (Tunisia) Ons Jabeur [12]
23	28	(Canada) Leylah Fernandez	2,254	130	70	25	120	2,289	Fourth round, lost to (United States) Shelby Rogers
24	29	(Latvia) Jeļena Ostapenko	2,205	130	10	180+280	390+55	2,070	Semifinals, lost to (Belarus) Victoria Azarenka [27]
25	31	(Russia) Veronika Kudermetova	2,045	-	-	110+100	65+80	1,980	Third round, lost to (Poland) Iga Świątek [2]
26	33	(Slovenia) Tamara Zidanšek	1,841	-	-	30	65	1,876	Third round, lost to (Australia) Ajla Tomljanović
27	32	(Belarus) Victoria Azarenka	1,856	-	-	1	650	2,505	Runner-up, lost to (Spain) Paula Badosa [21]
28	35	(Spain) Sara Sorribes Tormo	1,760	-	-	55	10	1,715	Second round, lost to (Russia) Anna Kalinskaya [Q]
29	36	(Argentina) ~~Nadia Podoroska~~	1,722	820	10	50	0	862	Withdrew due to physical ailments
30	38	(Italy) Camila Giorgi	1,660	-	-	10	10	1,660	Second round, lost to (United States) Amanda Anisimova
31	39	(Switzerland) Jil Teichmann	1,650	10	0	30	10	1,620	Second round, lost to (Romania) Irina-Camelia Begu
32	40	(Romania) Sorana Cîrstea	1,594	-	-	30	65	1,629	Third round, lost to (Ukraine) Elina Svitolina [4]

† Only players who were counting their 2020 French Open points in their rankings as of October 4, 2021 are shown in these columns.

=== Other entrants ===
The following players received wildcards into the singles main draw:

- (Belgium) Kim Clijsters
- (France) Elsa Jacquemot
- (United States) Ashlyn Krueger
- (United States) Claire Liu
- ~~(United States) Caty McNally~~
- (United Kingdom) Emma Raducanu
- (United States) Katrina Scott
- (United States) Katie Volynets

The following players received entry using a protected ranking into the singles main draw:

- (China) Zheng Saisai

The following players received entry from the qualifying draw:

- (United States) Usue Maitane Arconada
- (Kazakhstan) Zarina Diyas
- (Belgium) Kirsten Flipkens
- (Poland) Magdalena Fręch
- (Japan) Mai Hontama
- (Russia) Anna Kalinskaya
- (Ukraine) Kateryna Kozlova
- (Chinese Taipei) Liang En-shuo
- (United States) Alycia Parks
- (Romania) Elena-Gabriela Ruse
- (Australia) Astra Sharma
- (Italy) Martina Trevisan

The following players received entry as lucky losers:

- (Brazil) Beatriz Haddad Maia
- (Slovakia) Kristína Kučová
- (Italy) Jasmine Paolini

=== Withdrawals ===
Before the tournament

- (Russia) Ekaterina Alexandrova → replaced by (Czech Republic) Marie Bouzková
- (Australia) Ashleigh Barty → replaced by (Slovenia) Polona Hercog
- (Switzerland) Belinda Bencic → replaced by (Slovakia) Kristína Kučová
- (United States) Jennifer Brady → replaced by (Colombia) Camila Osorio
- (United States) Sofia Kenin → replaced by (Croatia) Ana Konjuh
- (United Kingdom) Johanna Konta → replaced by (Chinese Taipei) Hsieh Su-wei
- (United States) Caty McNally → replaced by (Italy) Jasmine Paolini
- (France) Kristina Mladenovic → replaced by (Spain) Nuria Párrizas Díaz
- (Czech Republic) Karolína Muchová → replaced by (Belarus) Aliaksandra Sasnovich
- (Japan) Naomi Osaka → replaced by (Japan) Misaki Doi
- (Argentina) Nadia Podoroska → replaced by (Brazil) Beatriz Haddad Maia
- (Belarus) Aryna Sabalenka → replaced by (United States) Lauren Davis
- (Belgium) Alison Van Uytvanck → replaced by (Egypt) Mayar Sherif
- (Russia) Elena Vesnina → replaced by (Slovakia) Anna Karolína Schmiedlová
- (United States) Serena Williams → replaced by (United States) Madison Brengle

== WTA doubles main-draw entrants ==
=== Seeds ===
Country	Player	Country	Player	Rank	Seed
CZE	Barbora Krejčiková	CZE	Kateřina Siniaková	3	1
TPE	Hsieh Su-wei	BEL	Elise Mertens	7	2
JPN	Shuko Aoyama	JPN	Ena Shibahara	16	3
CHI	Alexa Guarachi	USA	Desirae Krawczyk	31	4
USA	Nicole Melichar-Martinez	NED	Demi Schuurs	35	5
USA	Hayley Carter	CAN	Gabriela Dabrowski	41	6
CRO	Darija Jurak	SLO	Andreja Klepač	46	7
CAN	Sharon Fichman	MEX	Giuliana Olmos	57	8

- Rankings are as of September 27, 2021.

=== Other entrants ===
The following pairs received wildcards into the doubles main draw:

- (United States) Amanda Anisimova / (Ukraine) Dayana Yastremska
- (United States) Reese Brantmeier / (United States) Katrina Scott
- (Romania) Simona Halep / (Romania) Elena-Gabriela Ruse

The following pairs received entry using protected rankings:

- (Japan) Nao Hibino / (Poland) Alicja Rosolska
- (Germany) Julia Lohoff / (Russia) Alexandra Panova
- (Australia) Anastasia Rodionova / (Australia) Arina Rodionova
- (United Kingdom) Heather Watson / (China) Zheng Saisai

=== Withdrawals ===
Before the tournament

- (Russia) Anna Blinkova / (Belarus) Aliaksandra Sasnovich → replaced by (Norway) Ulrikke Eikeri / (Belarus) Aliaksandra Sasnovich
- (France) Caroline Garcia / (France) Kristina Mladenovic → replaced by (Belgium) Kirsten Flipkens / (Spain) Sara Sorribes Tormo

== See also ==
- 2021 ATP Tour
- ATP Tour Masters 1000
- List of ATP Tour top-level tournament singles champions
- Tennis Masters Series records and statistics
- 2021 WTA Tour
- WTA 1000 tournaments
- WTA Premier Mandatory/5
- List of WTA Tour top-level tournament singles champions
