= 2022 BNP Paribas Open =

- Date: March 9–20
- Edition: 48th (ATP) / 33rd (WTA)
- Category: ATP Tour Masters 1000 (Men); WTA 1000 (Women)
- Draw: 96S / 32D
- Prize money: $9,554,920 (ATP) $8,369,455 (WTA)
- Surface: Hard
- Location: Indian Wells, California, United States
- Venue: Indian Wells Tennis Garden

Champions

Men's singles
- (United States) Taylor Fritz

Women's singles
- (Poland) Iga Świątek

Men's doubles
- (United States) John Isner / (United States) Jack Sock

Women's doubles
- (China) Xu Yifan / (China) Yang Zhaoxuan
← 2021 ·	Indian Wells Open	· 2023 →

The 2022 Indian Wells Open (branded as the 2022 BNP Paribas Open for sponsorship reasons) was a professional men's and women's tennis tournament played in Indian Wells, California. It was the 48th edition of the men's event and 33rd of the women's event and was classified as an ATP Tour Masters 1000 event on the 2022 ATP Tour and a WTA 1000 event on the 2022 WTA Tour. Both the men's and the women's qualifying and main draw events took place from March 7 through March 20, 2022 on outdoor hard courts at the Indian Wells Tennis Garden. It was returned to its traditional March schedule for the first time since 2019 after the previous tournament was held five months earlier in October 2021 due to the COVID-19 pandemic.

Cameron Norrie was the defending men's singles champion, but he lost in the quarterfinals to Carlos Alcaraz. Taylor Fritz defeated Rafael Nadal in the final to win his first ATP Masters 1000 title, making him the first American to win at Indian Wells since Andre Agassi in 2001. Paula Badosa was the defending women's singles champion, but she lost in the semifinals to Maria Sakkari. Iga Świątek defeated Sakkari in the final to win her first Indian Wells title and her second consecutive WTA 1000 title of the year, making her the first Polish player to win at Indian Wells.

John Peers and Filip Polášek were the defending men's doubles champions, but they lost in the first round to Marcelo Arévalo and Jean-Julien Rojer. John Isner and Jack Sock defeated Santiago González and Édouard Roger-Vasselin in the final to win their second Indian Wells doubles title together after winning their first in 2018. Hsieh Su-wei and Elise Mertens were the defending women's doubles champions, but only Mertens returned to compete. She partnered with Veronika Kudermetova, but lost in the first round to Eri Hozumi and Makoto Ninomiya. Xu Yifan and Yang Zhaoxuan defeated Asia Muhammad and Ena Shibahara in the final to win their first WTA 1000 doubles title and become the first Chinese champions at Indian Wells since Peng Shuai in 2014.

== Champions ==
=== Men's singles ===
- (United States) Taylor Fritz def. (Spain) Rafael Nadal, 6–3, 7–6^{(7–5)}

This was Fritz's first ATP Tour singles title of the year, and second overall. This was his first title at ATP Masters 1000 level.

=== Women's singles ===
- (Poland) Iga Świątek def. (Greece) Maria Sakkari, 6–4, 6–1.

This was Świątek's second WTA title of the year, and her fifth overall.

=== Men's doubles ===
- (United States) John Isner / (United States) Jack Sock def. (Mexico) Santiago González / (France) Édouard Roger-Vasselin, 7–6^{(7–4)}, 6–3

=== Women's doubles ===
- (China) Xu Yifan / (China) Yang Zhaoxuan def. (United States) Asia Muhammad / (Japan) Ena Shibahara, 7–5, 7–6^{(7–4)}

== Points and prize money ==
=== Point distribution ===
Event	W	F	SF	QF	R16	R32	R64	R128	Q	Q2	Q1
Men's singles	1000	600	360	180	90	45	25*	10	16	8	0
Men's doubles	1000	600	360	180	90	0	—	—	—	—	—
Women's singles	1000	650	390	215	120	65	35*	10	30	20	2
Women's doubles	1000	650	390	215	120	10	—	—	—	—	—

* Players with byes receive first round points.

=== Prize money ===
The prize money for the 2022 BNP Paribas Open was $17,168,110 (ATP: $8,584,055, WTA $8,584,055). All prize money is in US Dollars.

Event	W	F	SF	QF	R16	R32	R64	R128	Q2	Q1
Men's singles	$1,231,245	$646,110	$343,985	$179,940	$94,575	$54,400	$30,130	$18,200	$9,205	$5,025
Women's singles	$1,231,245	$646,110	$343,985	$179,940	$94,575	$54,400	$30,130	$18,200	$9,205	$5,025
Men's doubles*	$426,010	$225,980	$120,520	$61,100	$32,630	$17,580	—	—	—	—
Women's doubles*	$426,010	$225,980	$120,520	$61,100	$32,630	$17,580	—	—	—	—

*per team

== See also ==
- 2022 ATP Tour
- ATP Tour Masters 1000
- List of ATP Tour top-level tournament singles champions
- Tennis Masters Series records and statistics
- 2022 WTA Tour
- WTA 1000 tournaments
- WTA Premier Mandatory/5
- List of WTA Tour top-level tournament singles champions
