= 2021 BNP Paribas Open – Men's singles =

Tennis tournament event

Men's singles
- 2021 BNP Paribas Open

Final
- Champion: (United Kingdom) Cameron Norrie
- Runner-up: (Georgia (country)) Nikoloz Basilashvili
- Score: 3–6, 6–4, 6–1

Details
- Draw: 96 (12 Q / 5 WC )
- Seeds: 32

Events
Singles	men	women
Doubles	men	women
- Indian Wells Masters

Cameron Norrie defeated Nikoloz Basilashvili in the final, 3–6, 6–4, 6–1 to win the men's singles tennis title at the 2021 Indian Wells Masters.It was his first ATP Tour Masters 1000 title, and he became the first Briton to win the title. Basilashvili became the first Georgian to reach a Masters-level final since Alex Metreveli in 1968, and the first to do so while representing Georgia as an independent nation.

Dominic Thiem was the reigning champion from when the event was last held in 2019, but did not participate due to a long-standing wrist injury.

With no former champions participating, a new Indian Wells champion was guaranteed. For the first time, all four semifinalists at a Masters event were ranked outside of the world's top 25.

== Seeds ==
All seeds received a bye into the second round.

1. (Russia) Daniil Medvedev (fourth round)
2. (Greece) Stefanos Tsitsipas (quarterfinals)
3. (Germany) Alexander Zverev (quarterfinals)
4. (Russia) Andrey Rublev (third round)
5. (Italy) Matteo Berrettini (third round)
6. (Norway) Casper Ruud (fourth round)
7. (Canada) Félix Auger-Aliassime (second round)
8. (Poland) Hubert Hurkacz (quarterfinals)
9. (Canada) Denis Shapovalov (third round)
10. (Italy) Jannik Sinner (fourth round)
11. (Argentina) Diego Schwartzman (quarterfinals)
12. (Spain) Pablo Carreño Busta (third round)
13. (Chile) Cristian Garín (third round)
14. (France) Gaël Monfils (fourth round)
15. (Spain) Roberto Bautista Agut (third round)
16. (United States) Reilly Opelka (third round)

17. (Italy) Lorenzo Sonego (second round)
18. (United Kingdom) Daniel Evans (third round)
19. (Russia) Aslan Karatsev (fourth round)
20. (United States) John Isner (third round, withdrew)
21. (United Kingdom) Cameron Norrie (champion)
22. (Australia) Alex de Minaur (fourth round)
23. (Bulgaria) Grigor Dimitrov (semifinals)
24. (Russia) Karen Khachanov (fourth round)
25. (Italy) Fabio Fognini (third round)
26. (South Africa) Lloyd Harris (third round)
27. (Serbia) Filip Krajinović (third round)
28. (Serbia) Dušan Lajović (second round)
29. (Georgia (country)) Nikoloz Basilashvili (final)
30. (Spain) Carlos Alcaraz (second round)
31. (United States) Taylor Fritz (semifinals)
32. (United States) Sebastian Korda (second round)

Click on the seed number of a player to go to their draw section.

== Draw ==
Key

- Q = Qualifier
- WC = Wild card
- LL = Lucky loser
- Alt = Alternate
- ITF = ITF entry
- PR = Protected ranking
- SR = Special ranking
- SE = Special exempt
- JE = Junior exempt
- JR = Junior Accelerator Programme entrant
- CO = College Accelerator Programme entrant
- NG = Next Gen Accelerator Program entrant
- w/o = Walkover
- r = Retired
- d = Defaulted

=== Finals ===
Quarterfinals
23	(Bulgaria) Grigor Dimitrov	3	6	7^{7}
8	(Poland) Hubert Hurkacz	6	4	6^{2}
21	(United Kingdom) Cameron Norrie	6	6
11	(Argentina) Diego Schwartzman	0	2
31	(United States) Taylor Fritz	4	6	7^{7}
3	(Germany) Alexander Zverev	6	3	6^{3}
29	(Georgia (country)) Nikoloz Basilashvili	6	2	6
2	(Greece) Stefanos Tsitsipas	4	6	4

Semifinals
23	(Bulgaria) Grigor Dimitrov	2	4
21	(United Kingdom) Cameron Norrie	6	6
31	(United States) Taylor Fritz	6^{5}	3
29	(Georgia (country)) Nikoloz Basilashvili	7^{7}	6

Final
21	(United Kingdom) Cameron Norrie	3	6	6
29	(Georgia (country)) Nikoloz Basilashvili	6	4	1

=== Top half ===
==== Section 1 ====
First round
(United States) M McDonald	6	6
(Australia) J Duckworth	3	3
(United States) M Giron	6^{7}	6	6
Q	(Netherlands) B van de Zandschulp	7^{9}	2	4
(Germany) D Altmaier	6	6
(United States) S Querrey	2	4
PR	(Germany) P Kohlschreiber	2	4
(Japan) T Daniel	6	6

Second round
1	(Russia) D Medvedev	6	6
(United States) M McDonald	4	2
(United States) M Giron	6^{2}	5
27	(Serbia) F Krajinović	7^{7}	7
23	(Bulgaria) G Dimitrov	6	6
(Germany) D Altmaier	4	2
(Japan) T Daniel	5	3
16	(United States) R Opelka	7	6

Third round
1	(Russia) D Medvedev	6	7^{7}
27	(Serbia) F Krajinović	2	6^{1}
23	(Bulgaria) G Dimitrov	6	6
16	(United States) R Opelka	3	4

Fourth round
1	(Russia) D Medvedev	6	4	3
23	(Bulgaria) G Dimitrov	4	6	6

==== Section 2 ====
First round
(Canada) V Pospisil	6	4	6
WC	(United States) J. J. Wolf	4	6	4
Q	(Italy) S Caruso	6	6
WC	(United States) Z Svajda	3	1
(France) B Paire	4	4
(United States) F Tiafoe	6	6
(Australia) A Popyrin	6	7^{7}
(Serbia) M Kecmanović	3	6^{4}

Second round
9	(Canada) D Shapovalov	3
(Canada) V Pospisil	0^{r}
Q	(Italy) S Caruso	0	2
19	(Russia) A Karatsev	6	6
32	(United States) S Korda	0	4
(United States) F Tiafoe	6	6
(Australia) A Popyrin	1	5
8	(Poland) H Hurkacz	6	7

Third round
9	(Canada) D Shapovalov	5	2
19	(Russia) A Karatsev	7	6
(United States) F Tiafoe	3	2
8	(Poland) H Hurkacz	6	6

Fourth round
19	(Russia) A Karatsev	1	3
8	(Poland) H Hurkacz	6	6

==== Section 3 ====
First round
(Spain) C Taberner	6	6
(Spain) J Munar	3	3
(United States) T Paul	6	7^{7}
(Spain) F López	3	6^{3}
(Brazil) T Monteiro	4	3
(United States) T Sandgren	6	6
(South Korea) S-w Kwon	6	3	4
(Argentina) G Pella	1	6	6

Second round
4	(Russia) A Rublev	6	6
(Spain) C Taberner	3	4
(United States) T Paul	6	6
28	(Serbia) D Lajović	2	3
21	(United Kingdom) C Norrie	6	5	6
(United States) T Sandgren	4	7	0
(Argentina) G Pella	5	3
15	(Spain) R Bautista Agut	7	6

Third round
4	(Russia) A Rublev	4	6	5
(United States) T Paul	6	3	7
21	(United Kingdom) C Norrie	6	5	6
15	(Spain) R Bautista Agut	4	7	3

Fourth round
(United States) T Paul	4	6	2
21	(United Kingdom) C Norrie	6	4	6

==== Section 4 ====
First round
Q	(United States) M Cressy	6^{3}	6	7
(Serbia) L Đere	7^{7}	1	5
(Japan) K Nishikori	6^{5}	6	6
Q	(Portugal) J Sousa	7^{7}	3	2
(Spain) A Davidovich Fokina	6^{5}	6	7
(United States) S Johnson	7^{7}	3	5
Q	(Argentina) R Olivo	5	5
(Spain) R Carballés Baena	7	7

Second round
11	(Argentina) D Schwartzman	6	3	7
Q	(United States) M Cressy	2	6	5
(Japan) K Nishikori	6	3	4
18	(United Kingdom) D Evans	4	6	6
26	(South Africa) L Harris	6	6
(Spain) A Davidovich Fokina	3	3
(Spain) R Carballés Baena	1	2
6	(Norway) C Ruud	6	6

Third round
11	(Argentina) D Schwartzman	5	6	6
18	(United Kingdom) D Evans	7	4	0
26	(South Africa) L Harris	7^{7}	4	4
6	(Norway) C Ruud	6^{4}	6	6

Fourth round
11	(Argentina) D Schwartzman	6	6
6	(Norway) C Ruud	3	3

=== Bottom half ===
==== Section 5 ====
First round
(United States) D Kudla	1	6^{0}
Q	(Chile) A Tabilo	6	7^{7}
(Argentina) F Coria	3	2
(United States) B Nakashima	6	6
(Argentina) F Delbonis	3	6	6^{2}
(Japan) Y Nishioka	6	3	7^{7}
WC	(United States) J Sock	5	6	3
(Australia) J Millman	7	4	6

Second round
5	(Italy) M Berrettini	6	7
Q	(Chile) A Tabilo	4	5
(United States) B Nakashima	3	4
31	(United States) T Fritz	6	6
20	(United States) J Isner	6	6
(Japan) Y Nishioka	3	4
(Australia) J Millman	2	2
10	(Italy) J Sinner	6	6

Third round
5	(Italy) M Berrettini	4	3
31	(United States) T Fritz	6	6
20	(United States) J Isner
10	(Italy) J Sinner	w/o

Fourth round
31	(United States) T Fritz	6	6
10	(Italy) J Sinner	4	3

==== Section 6 ====
First round
(Hungary) M Fucsovics	6	3	2
(Italy) G Mager	1	6	6
(South Africa) K Anderson	7	6
(Australia) J Thompson	5	2
WC	(United Kingdom) A Murray	6	6
(France) A Mannarino	3	2
Q	(Turkey) C İlkel	6^{5}	4
(United States) J Brooksby	7^{7}	6

Second round
14	(France) G Monfils	6	6
(Italy) G Mager	4	2
(South Africa) K Anderson	7^{9}	7^{7}
17	(Italy) L Sonego	6^{7}	6^{3}
30	(Spain) C Alcaraz	7	3	2
WC	(United Kingdom) A Murray	5	6	6
(United States) J Brooksby	4	6	1
3	(Germany) A Zverev	6	3	6

Third round
14	(France) G Monfils	7	6
(South Africa) K Anderson	5	2
WC	(United Kingdom) A Murray	4	6^{4}
3	(Germany) A Zverev	6	7^{7}

Fourth round
14	(France) G Monfils	1	3
3	(Germany) A Zverev	6	6

==== Section 7 ====
First round
(Spain) A Ramos Viñolas	6	6
(Italy) L Musetti	1	3
(Belarus) E Gerasimov	3	3
Q	(United States) C Eubanks	6	6
(Germany) D Koepfer	7^{7}	2	0
(Finland) E Ruusuvuori	6^{3}	6	6
(Argentina) F Bagnis	3	1
Q	(Ecuador) E Gómez	6	6

Second round
7	(Canada) F Auger-Aliassime	4	2
(Spain) A Ramos Viñolas	6	6
Q	(United States) C Eubanks	4	3
29	(Georgia (country)) N Basilashvili	6	6
24	(Russia) K Khachanov	6	7
(Finland) E Ruusuvuori	2	5
Q	(Ecuador) E Gómez	1	4
12	(Spain) P Carreño Busta	6	6

Third round
(Spain) A Ramos Viñolas	6	6^{2}	2
29	(Georgia (country)) N Basilashvili	4	7^{7}	6
24	(Russia) K Khachanov	6	6
12	(Spain) P Carreño Busta	0	4

Fourth round
29	(Georgia (country)) N Basilashvili	6	7^{8}
24	(Russia) K Khachanov	4	6^{6}

==== Section 8 ====
First round
WC	(Denmark) H Rune	4	1
Q	(United States) E Escobedo	6	6
Q	(Australia) A Vukic	7	6
(Spain) P Andújar	5	4
(Germany) J-L Struff	7^{7}	6
(Colombia) DE Galán	6^{4}	3
(Spain) P Martínez	6	6
Q	(Italy) R Marcora	4	0

Second round
13	(Chile) C Garín	7	6
Q	(United States) E Escobedo	5	2
Q	(Australia) A Vukic	4	5
22	(Australia) A de Minaur	6	7
25	(Italy) F Fognini	6	4	6
(Germany) J-L Struff	4	6	3
(Spain) P Martínez	2	4
2	(Greece) S Tsitsipas	6	6

Third round
13	(Chile) C Garín	4	2
22	(Australia) A de Minaur	6	6
25	(Italy) F Fognini	6	3	4
2	(Greece) S Tsitsipas	2	6	6

Fourth round
22	(Australia) A de Minaur	7^{7}	6^{3}	2
2	(Greece) S Tsitsipas	6^{3}	7^{7}	6

== Qualifying ==
=== Seeds ===
1. (Netherlands) Botic van de Zandschulp (qualified)
2. (Italy) Salvatore Caruso (qualified)
3. (Australia) Alex Bolt (first round)
4. (United States) Maxime Cressy (qualified)
5. (Kazakhstan) Mikhail Kukushkin (qualifying competition)
6. (Russia) Evgeny Donskoy (qualifying competition)
7. (Italy) Federico Gaio (first round)
8. (United States) Mitchell Krueger (first round)
9. (Chinese Taipei) Jason Jung (first round, retired)
10. (Turkey) Altuğ Çelikbilek (qualifying competition)
11. (Ecuador) Emilio Gómez (qualified)
12. (United States) Bjorn Fratangelo (qualifying competition)
13. (United States) Ernesto Escobedo (qualified)
14. (Turkey) Cem İlkel (qualified)
15. (Portugal) João Sousa (qualified)
16. (Australia) Thanasi Kokkinakis (first round)
17. (Chile) Alejandro Tabilo (qualified)
18. (France) Enzo Couacaud (qualifying competition)
19. (India) Ramkumar Ramanathan (first round)
20. (United States) Christopher Eubanks (qualified)
21. (Latvia) Ernests Gulbis (first round)
22. (Argentina) Renzo Olivo (qualified)
23. (Croatia) Ivo Karlović (qualifying competition)
24. (Australia) Aleksandar Vukic (qualified)

=== Qualifiers ===
1. (Netherlands) Botic van de Zandschulp
2. (Italy) Salvatore Caruso
3. (Italy) Roberto Marcora
4. (United States) Maxime Cressy
5. (United States) Ernesto Escobedo
6. (Chile) Alejandro Tabilo
7. (Argentina) Renzo Olivo
8. (Turkey) Cem İlkel
9. (United States) Christopher Eubanks
10. (Portugal) João Sousa
11. (Ecuador) Emilio Gómez
12. (Australia) Aleksandar Vukic

=== Qualifying draw ===
==== First qualifier ====
First round
1	(Netherlands) Botic van de Zandschulp	6	6
(Canada) Peter Polansky	3	3
(United States) Thai-Son Kwiatkowski	6	6
21	(Latvia) Ernests Gulbis	4	2

Qualifying competition
1	(Netherlands) Botic van de Zandschulp	6	4	6
(United States) Thai-Son Kwiatkowski	4	6	2

==== Second qualifier ====
First round
2	(Italy) Salvatore Caruso	6	6
(Australia) Jason Kubler	0	3
(Ecuador) Roberto Quiroz	6	3	6
19	(India) Ramkumar Ramanathan	4	6	4

Qualifying competition
2	(Italy) Salvatore Caruso	6	6
(Ecuador) Roberto Quiroz	4	4

==== Third qualifier ====
First round
3	(Australia) Alex Bolt	7^{7}	6^{5}	2
(Italy) Roberto Marcora	6^{5}	7^{7}	6
(Italy) Matteo Viola	6	3	7^{11}
16	(Australia) Thanasi Kokkinakis	3	6	6^{9}

Qualifying competition
(Italy) Roberto Marcora	6	7
(Italy) Matteo Viola	2	5

==== Fourth qualifier ====
First round
4	(United States) Maxime Cressy	6	4	6
(Japan) Hiroki Moriya	4	6	3
(United States) Christian Harrison	3	7	6^{2}
18	(France) Enzo Couacaud	6	5	7^{7}

Qualifying competition
4	(United States) Maxime Cressy	7	6^{2}	6
18	(France) Enzo Couacaud	5	7^{7}	2

==== Fifth qualifier ====
First round
5	(Kazakhstan) Mikhail Kukushkin	5
(Canada) Steven Diez	2^{r}
PR	(Uzbekistan) Denis Istomin	3	2
13	(United States) Ernesto Escobedo	6	6

Qualifying competition
5	(Kazakhstan) Mikhail Kukushkin	2	4
13	(United States) Ernesto Escobedo	6	6

==== Sixth qualifier ====
First round
6	(Russia) Evgeny Donskoy	6^{10}	7^{7}	7
(Spain) Adrián Menéndez Maceiras	7^{12}	6^{2}	5
(United States) Michael Mmoh	3	4
17	(Chile) Alejandro Tabilo	6	6

Qualifying competition
6	(Russia) Evgeny Donskoy	2	1
17	(Chile) Alejandro Tabilo	6	6

==== Seventh qualifier ====
First round
7	(Italy) Federico Gaio	3	6	3
(Italy) Andrea Arnaboldi	6	3	6
WC	(Japan) Shintaro Mochizuki	3	2
22	(Argentina) Renzo Olivo	6	6

Qualifying competition
(Italy) Andrea Arnaboldi	1	7^{8}	3
22	(Argentina) Renzo Olivo	6	6^{6}	6

==== Eighth qualifier ====
First round
8	(United States) Mitchell Krueger	6	6^{10}	5
WC	(United States) Govind Nanda	0	7^{12}	7
(France) Maxime Janvier	2	7^{7}	6^{4}
14	(Turkey) Cem İlkel	6	6^{4}	7^{7}

Qualifying competition
WC	(United States) Govind Nanda	1	6	4
14	(Turkey) Cem İlkel	6	2	6

==== Ninth qualifier ====
First round
9	(Chinese Taipei) Jason Jung	3	6	2^{r}
WC	(United States) Stefan Kozlov	6	3	5
(Belgium) Michael Geerts	1	3
20	(United States) Christopher Eubanks	6	6

Qualifying competition
WC	(United States) Stefan Kozlov	6	0	5
20	(United States) Christopher Eubanks	2	6	7

==== Tenth qualifier ====
First round
10	(Turkey) Altuğ Çelikbilek	2	6	6
(Italy) Thomas Fabbiano	6	2	1
WC	(United States) Victor Lilov	2	0
15	(Portugal) João Sousa	6	6

Qualifying competition
10	(Turkey) Altuğ Çelikbilek	3	5
15	(Portugal) João Sousa	6	7

==== Eleventh qualifier ====
First round
11	(Ecuador) Emilio Gómez	6	6
WC	(United States) Aleksandar Kovacevic	4	2
(Canada) Brayden Schnur	6	6^{5}	6^{7}
23	(Croatia) Ivo Karlović	4	7^{7}	7^{9}

Qualifying competition
11	(Ecuador) Emilio Gómez	6	7^{9}
23	(Croatia) Ivo Karlović	3	6^{7}

==== Twelfth qualifier ====
First round
12	(United States) Bjorn Fratangelo	6	6
(Denmark) Mikael Torpegaard	2	1
(United States) Ulises Blanch	2	5
24	(Australia) Aleksandar Vukic	6	7

Qualifying competition
12	(United States) Bjorn Fratangelo	1	4
24	(Australia) Aleksandar Vukic	6	6
