= 2019 BNP Paribas Open =

- Date: March 4–17
- Edition: 46th (ATP) / 31st (WTA)
- Category: ATP Tour Masters 1000 (Men); WTA Premier Mandatory (Women)
- Draw: 96S / 32D
- Prize money: $9,314,875 (ATP) $9,035,428 (WTA)
- Surface: Hard
- Location: Indian Wells, California, United States
- Venue: Indian Wells Tennis Garden

Champions

Men's singles
- (Austria) Dominic Thiem

Women's singles
- (Canada) Bianca Andreescu

Men's doubles
- (Croatia) Nikola Mektić / (Argentina) Horacio Zeballos

Women's doubles
- (Belgium) Elise Mertens / (Belarus) Aryna Sabalenka
← 2018 ·	Indian Wells Open	· 2021 →

The 2019 Indian Wells Open (also known as the 2019 BNP Paribas Open for sponsorship reasons) was a professional tennis tournament played at Indian Wells, California in March 2019. It was the 46th edition of the men's event and 31st of the women's event, and was classified as an ATP Tour Masters 1000 event on the 2019 ATP Tour and a Premier Mandatory event on the 2019 WTA Tour. Both the men's and the women's events took place at the Indian Wells Tennis Garden in Indian Wells, California, from March 4 through March 17, 2019, on outdoor hard courts.

All top 75 ranked WTA and ATP Tour singles players were included in the initial entry list, but two-time champion Maria Sharapova announced her withdrawal three weeks before the tournament due to a right shoulder injury.

Juan Martín del Potro and Naomi Osaka were the defending champions in the men's and women's draw respectively. Del Potro withdrew before the tournament began due to a knee injury. Osaka lost in the fourth round to Belinda Bencic.

== Points and prize money ==
=== Point distribution ===
Event	W	F	SF	QF	Round of 16	Round of 32	Round of 64	Round of 128	Q	Q2	Q1
Men's singles	1000	600	360	180	90	45	25*	10	16	8	0
Men's doubles	1000	600	360	180	90	0	—	—	—	—	—
Women's singles	1000	650	390	215	120	65	35*	10	30	20	2
Women's doubles	1000	650	390	215	120	10	—	—	—	—	—

- Players with byes receive first-round points.

=== Prize money ===
Event	W	F	SF	QF	Round of 16	Round of 32	Round of 64	Round of 128	Q2	Q1
Men's singles	$1,354,010	$686,000	$354,000	$182,000	$91,205	$48,775	$26,430	$16,425	$6,790	$3,395
Women's singles	$1,354,010	$686,000	$354,000	$182,000	$91,205	$48,775	$26,430	$16,425	$6,790	$3,395
Men's doubles	$457,290	$223,170	$111,170	$57,000	$30,060	$16,090	—	—	—	—
Women's doubles	$457,290	$223,170	$111,170	$57,000	$30,060	$16,090	—	—	—	—

== ATP singles main-draw entrants ==
=== Seeds ===
The following are the seeded players. Rankings and seedings are based on ATP rankings as of March 4, 2019.

Seed	Rank	Player	Points before	Points defending	Points won	Points after	Status
1	1	(Serbia) Novak Djokovic	10,955	10	45	10,990	Third round lost to (Germany) Philipp Kohlschreiber
2	2	(Spain) Rafael Nadal	8,365	0	360	8,725	Semifinals withdrew due to right knee injury
3	3	(Germany) Alexander Zverev	6,595	10	45	6,630	Third round lost to (Germany) Jan-Lennard Struff
4	4	(Switzerland) Roger Federer	4,600	600	600	4,600	Runner-up, lost to (Austria) Dominic Thiem [7]
~~5~~	~~6~~	(South Africa) ~~Kevin Anderson~~	4,295	180	0	4,115	Withdrew due to elbow injury
6	7	(Japan) Kei Nishikori	4,190	0	45	4,235	Third round lost to (Poland) Hubert Hurkacz
7	8	(Austria) Dominic Thiem	3,800	45	1,000	4,755	Champion, defeated (Switzerland) Roger Federer [4]
8	9	(United States) John Isner	3,405	10	90	3,485	Fourth round lost to (Russia) Karen Khachanov [12]
9	10	(Greece) Stefanos Tsitsipas	3,175	25	10	3,160	Second round lost to (Canada) Félix Auger-Aliassime [WC]
10	11	(Croatia) Marin Čilić	3,095	45	45	3,095	Third round lost to (Canada) Denis Shapovalov [24]
11	12	(Croatia) Borna Ćorić	2,695	360	10	2,345	Second round lost to (Croatia) Ivo Karlović
12	13	(Russia) Karen Khachanov	2,675	10	180	2,845	Quarterfinals lost to (Spain) Rafael Nadal [2]
13	14	(Canada) Milos Raonic	2,275	360	360	2,275	Semifinals lost to (Austria) Dominic Thiem [7]
14	15	(Russia) Daniil Medvedev	2,230	45	45	2,230	Third round lost to (Serbia) Filip Krajinović [Q]
15	16	(Italy) Marco Cecchinato	2,091	(80)^{†}	10	2,021	Second round lost to (Spain) Albert Ramos Viñolas
16	17	(Italy) Fabio Fognini	1,885	10	10	1,885	Second round lost to (Moldova) Radu Albot [Q]
17	18	(Georgia (country)) Nikoloz Basilashvili	1,865	10	10	1,865	Second round lost to (India) Prajnesh Gunneswaran [Q]
18	19	(France) Gaël Monfils	1,740	45	180	1,875	Quarterfinals withdrew due to Achilles tendon injury
~~19~~	~~20~~	(Spain) ~~Pablo Carreño Busta~~	1,705	90	0	1,615	Withdrew due to shoulder injury
20	21	(Belgium) David Goffin	1,650	0	10	1,660	Second round lost to (Serbia) Filip Krajinović [Q]
21	22	(Spain) Roberto Bautista Agut	1,545	45	10	1,510	Second round lost to (Japan) Yoshihito Nishioka
22	23	(United Kingdom) Kyle Edmund	1,520	10	90	1,600	Fourth round lost (Switzerland) Roger Federer [4]
23	24	(Australia) Alex de Minaur	1,508	25	10	1,493	Second round lost to (United States) Marcos Giron [Q]
24	25	(Canada) Denis Shapovalov	1,485	25	90	1,550	Fourth round lost to (Poland) Hubert Hurkacz
25	26	(Argentina) Diego Schwartzman	1,485	10	45	1,520	Third round lost to (Spain) Rafael Nadal [2]
~~26~~	~~28~~	(Bulgaria) ~~Grigor Dimitrov~~	1,310	10	0	1,300	Withdrew due to shoulder injury
27	29	(France) Gilles Simon	1,305	10	45	1,340	Third round lost to (Austria) Dominic Thiem [7]
28	30	(France) Lucas Pouille	1,265	10	10	1,265	Second round lost to (Poland) Hubert Hurkacz
29	31	(Hungary) Márton Fucsovics	1,220	25	10	1,205	Second round lost to (Switzerland) Stan Wawrinka
30	32	(Serbia) Laslo Đere	1,211	10	45	1,246	Third round lost to (Serbia) Miomir Kecmanović [LL]
31	33	(Australia) Nick Kyrgios	1,205	0	10	1,215	Second round lost to (Germany) Philipp Kohlschreiber
32	34	(Argentina) Guido Pella	1,205	10	45	1,240	Third round lost to (United States) John Isner [8]

† The player did not qualify for the tournament in 2018, but was defending points from an ATP Challenger Tour tournament.

=== Withdrawals ===
Rank	Player	Points before	Points defending	Points after	Reason
5	(Argentina) Juan Martín del Potro	4,585	1,000	3,585	Knee injury
27	(France) Richard Gasquet	1,340	0	1,340	Groin injury

=== Other entrants ===
The following players received wildcards into the singles main draw:

- (Canada) Félix Auger-Aliassime
- (Serbia) Laslo Đere
- (United States) Jared Donaldson
- (United States) Reilly Opelka
- (United States) Donald Young

The following players received entry from the qualifying draw:

- (Moldova) Radu Albot
- (Australia) Alex Bolt
- (United Kingdom) Dan Evans
- (United States) Bjorn Fratangelo
- (United States) Marcos Giron
- (India) Prajnesh Gunneswaran
- (France) Ugo Humbert
- (Uzbekistan) Denis Istomin
- (Japan) Tatsuma Ito
- (Serbia) Filip Krajinović
- (Australia) Alexei Popyrin
- (Sweden) Elias Ymer

The following players received entry as lucky losers:

- (Lithuania) Ričardas Berankis
- (Serbia) Miomir Kecmanović
- (Russia) Andrey Rublev

=== Withdrawals ===
Before the tournament

- (South Africa) Kevin Anderson → replaced by (Serbia) Miomir Kecmanović
- (Slovenia) Aljaž Bedene → replaced by (United States) Ryan Harrison
- (Spain) Pablo Carreño Busta → replaced by (Russia) Andrey Rublev
- (South Korea) Chung Hyeon → replaced by (Belarus) Ilya Ivashka
- (Argentina) Juan Martín del Potro → replaced by (Japan) Taro Daniel
- (Bulgaria) Grigor Dimitrov → replaced by (Lithuania) Ričardas Berankis
- (France) Richard Gasquet → replaced by (Argentina) Federico Delbonis
- (Canada) Vasek Pospisil → replaced by (United States) Mackenzie McDonald
- (Spain) Fernando Verdasco → replaced by (Latvia) Ernests Gulbis

During the tournament

- (France) Gaël Monfils
- (Spain) Rafael Nadal

=== Retirements ===
- (Slovakia) Martin Kližan
- (Japan) Yoshihito Nishioka

== ATP doubles main-draw entrants ==
=== Seeds ===
Country	Player	Country	Player	Rank^{1}	Seed
FRA	Pierre-Hugues Herbert	FRA	Nicolas Mahut	7	1
GBR	Jamie Murray	BRA	Bruno Soares	11	2
AUT	Oliver Marach	CRO	Mate Pavić	16	3
USA	Bob Bryan	USA	Mike Bryan	18	4
COL	Juan Sebastián Cabal	COL	Robert Farah	20	5
POL	Łukasz Kubot	BRA	Marcelo Melo	20	6
RSA	Raven Klaasen	NZL	Michael Venus	26	7
FIN	Henri Kontinen	AUS	John Peers	34	8

- ^{1} Rankings as of March 4, 2019.

=== Other entrants ===
The following pairs received wildcards into the doubles main draw:

- (United States) Taylor Fritz / (Australia) Nick Kyrgios
- (United States) Mackenzie McDonald / (United States) Reilly Opelka
- (France) Lucas Pouille / (Switzerland) Stan Wawrinka

The following pair received entry as alternates:

- (France) Adrian Mannarino / (France) Gaël Monfils

=== Withdrawals ===
- (Spain) Pablo Carreño Busta (shoulder injury)

== WTA singles main-draw entrants ==
=== Seeds ===
The following are the seeded players. Seedings are based on WTA rankings as of February 25, 2019. Rankings and points before are as of March 4, 2019.

Seed	Rank	Player	Points before	Points defending	Points won	Points after	Status
1	1	(Japan) Naomi Osaka	6,871	1,000	120	5,991	Fourth round lost to (Switzerland) Belinda Bencic [23]
2	2	(Romania) Simona Halep	5,727	390	120	5,457	Fourth round lost to (Czech Republic) Markéta Vondroušová
3	3	(Czech Republic) Petra Kvitová	5,605	65	10	5,550	Second round lost to (United States) Venus Williams
4	4	(United States) Sloane Stephens	5,277	65	10	5,222	Second round lost to (Switzerland) Stefanie Vögele [Q]
5	5	(Czech Republic) Karolína Plíšková	5,145	215	215	5,145	Quarterfinals lost to (Switzerland) Belinda Bencic [23]
6	6	(Ukraine) Elina Svitolina	4,900	65	390	5,225	Semifinals lost to (Canada) Bianca Andreescu [WC]
7	7	(Netherlands) Kiki Bertens	4,885	10	120	4,995	Fourth round lost to (Spain) Garbiñe Muguruza [20]
8	8	(Germany) Angelique Kerber	4,880	215	650	5,315	Runner-up, lost to (Canada) Bianca Andreescu [WC]
9	9	(Belarus) Aryna Sabalenka	3,565	65	120	3,620	Fourth round lost to (Germany) Angelique Kerber [8]
10	10	(United States) Serena Williams	3,406	65	65	3,406	Third round retired against (Spain) Garbiñe Muguruza [20]
11	11	(Latvia) Anastasija Sevastova	3,325	120	65	3,270	Third round retired against (Estonia) Anett Kontaveit [21]
12	12	(Australia) Ashleigh Barty	3,285	10	120	3,395	Fourth round lost to (Ukraine) Elina Svitolina [6]
13	13	(Denmark) Caroline Wozniacki	3,118	120	10	3,008	Second round lost to (Russia) Ekaterina Alexandrova
14	14	(Russia) Daria Kasatkina	2,985	650	10	2,345	Second round lost to (Czech Republic) Markéta Vondroušová
15	15	(Germany) Julia Görges	2,780	65	65	2,780	Third round lost to (Germany) Mona Barthel
16	16	(Belgium) Elise Mertens	2,745	10	65	2,800	Third round lost to (China) Wang Qiang [18]
17	17	(United States) Madison Keys	2,726	10	10	2,726	Second round lost to (Germany) Mona Barthel
18	18	(China) Wang Qiang	2,607	120	120	2,607	Fourth round lost to (Canada) Bianca Andreescu [WC]
19	19	(France) Caroline Garcia	2,460	120	10	2,350	Second round lost to (United States) Jennifer Brady [WC]
20	20	(Spain) Garbiñe Muguruza	2,430	10	215	2,635	Quarterfinals lost to (Canada) Bianca Andreescu [WC]
21	21	(Estonia) Anett Kontaveit	2,355	10	120	2,465	Fourth round lost to (Czech Republic) Karolína Plíšková [5]
22	22	(Latvia) Jeļena Ostapenko	2,251	65	65	2,251	Third round lost to (Czech Republic) Markéta Vondroušová
23	23	(Switzerland) Belinda Bencic	2,065	35	390	2,420	Semifinals lost to (Germany) Angelique Kerber [8]
24	28	(Ukraine) Lesia Tsurenko	1,751	10	65	1,806	Third round lost to (Belarus) Aryna Sabalenka [9]
25	25	(United States) Danielle Collins	1,906	120	65	1,851	Third round lost to (Japan) Naomi Osaka [1]
26	24	(Spain) Carla Suárez Navarro	1,923	215	10	1,718	Second round lost to (Russia) Natalia Vikhlyantseva [Q]
27	27	(Chinese Taipei) Hsieh Su-wei	1,865	65	10	1,810	Second round lost to (United Kingdom) Johanna Konta
28	26	(Croatia) Donna Vekić	1,875	10	10	1,875	Second round lost to (Belgium) Ysaline Bonaventure [Q]
29	31	(Romania) Mihaela Buzărnescu	1,650	10	10	1,650	Second round lost to (Australia) Daria Gavrilova
30	32	(Russia) Anastasia Pavlyuchenkova	1,565	10	10	1,565	Second round lost to (United States) Christina McHale [Q]
31	34	(Belarus) Aliaksandra Sasnovich	1,550	65	10	1,495	Second round lost to (Ukraine) Kateryna Kozlova [Q]
32	35	(Slovakia) Dominika Cibulková	1,502	10	10	1,502	Second round lost to (Canada) Bianca Andreescu [WC]

=== Withdrawals ===
Rank	Player	Points before	Points defending	Points after	Reason
29	(Russia) Maria Sharapova	1,716	10	1,706	Right shoulder injury
30	(Italy) Camila Giorgi	1,705	0	1,705	Injury

=== Other entrants ===
The following players received wildcards into the singles main draw:

- (Canada) Bianca Andreescu
- (United States) Amanda Anisimova
- (United States) Jennifer Brady
- (United States) Madison Brengle
- (United States) Lauren Davis
- (United States) Jessica Pegula
- (United States) Taylor Townsend
- (United States) Sachia Vickery

The following player received entry using a protected ranking into the singles main draw:

- (Germany) Laura Siegemund

The following players received entry from the qualifying draw:

- (Belgium) Ysaline Bonaventure
- (Kazakhstan) Zarina Diyas
- (Japan) Misaki Doi
- (Switzerland) Viktorija Golubic
- (Japan) Nao Hibino
- (Australia) Priscilla Hon
- (Ukraine) Kateryna Kozlova
- (United States) Christina McHale
- (United States) Caty McNally
- (Russia) Natalia Vikhlyantseva
- (Switzerland) Stefanie Vögele
- (China) Zhu Lin

=== Withdrawals ===
Before the tournament

- (Italy) Camila Giorgi → replaced by (Canada) Eugenie Bouchard
- (Thailand) Luksika Kumkhum → replaced by (Poland) Magda Linette
- (Russia) Ekaterina Makarova → replaced by (Sweden) Johanna Larsson
- (Russia) Maria Sharapova (right shoulder injury) → replaced by (Germany) Mona Barthel

=== Retirements ===
- (Latvia) Anastasija Sevastova (viral illness)
- (United States) Serena Williams (viral illness)

== WTA doubles main-draw entrants ==
=== Seeds ===
Country	Player	Country	Player	Rank^{1}	Seed
CZE	Barbora Krejčíková	CZE	Kateřina Siniaková	3	1
HUN	Tímea Babos	FRA	Kristina Mladenovic	8	2
TPE	Hsieh Su-wei	CZE	Barbora Strýcová	20	3
USA	Nicole Melichar	CZE	Květa Peschke	22	4
CAN	Gabriela Dabrowski	CHN	Xu Yifan	30	5
AUS	Samantha Stosur	CHN	Zhang Shuai	35	6
SLO	Andreja Klepač	ESP	María José Martínez Sánchez	38	7
TPE	Chan Hao-ching	TPE	Latisha Chan	39	8

- ^{1} Rankings as of February 25, 2019.

=== Other entrants ===
The following pairs received wildcards into the doubles main draw:

- (Belarus) Victoria Azarenka / (Ukraine) Elina Svitolina
- (Canada) Eugenie Bouchard / (United States) Sloane Stephens
- ~~(United States) Serena Williams / (United States) Venus Williams~~ (Withdrew to focus on singles)

The following pairs received entry as alternates:

- (Spain) Garbiñe Muguruza / (Spain) Carla Suárez Navarro
- (Russia) Anastasia Pavlyuchenkova / (Latvia) Anastasija Sevastova

=== Withdrawals ===
Before the tournament

- (United States) Serena Williams (change of schedule)
- (United States) Venus Williams (change of schedule)
- (Russia) Vera Zvonareva

During the tournament

- (Spain) Carla Suárez Navarro (hip injury)

== Champions ==
=== Men's singles ===
- (Austria) Dominic Thiem def. (Switzerland) Roger Federer, 3–6, 6–3, 7–5

=== Women's singles ===
- (Canada) Bianca Andreescu def. (Germany) Angelique Kerber, 6–4, 3–6, 6–4

=== Men's doubles ===
- (Croatia) Nikola Mektić / (Argentina) Horacio Zeballos def. (Poland) Łukasz Kubot / (Brazil) Marcelo Melo, 4–6, 6–4, [10–3]

=== Women's doubles ===
- (Belgium) Elise Mertens / (Belarus) Aryna Sabalenka def. (Czech Republic) Barbora Krejčíková / (Czech Republic) Kateřina Siniaková, 6–3, 6–2
