= 2021 BNP Paribas Open – Men's doubles =

Men's doubles
- 2021 BNP Paribas Open

Final
- Champions: (Australia) John Peers (Slovakia) Filip Polášek
- Runners-up: (Russia) Aslan Karatsev (Russia) Andrey Rublev
- Score: 6–3, 7–6^{(7–5)}

Events
Singles	men	women
Doubles	men	women
- BNP Paribas Open

John Peers and Filip Polášek defeated Aslan Karatsev and Andrey Rublev in the final, 6–3, 7–6^{(7–5)} to win the men's doubles tennis title at the 2021 Indian Wells Masters.

Nikola Mektić and Horacio Zeballos were the defending champions from when the tournament was last held in 2019, but chose to compete with different partners. Mektić played alongside Mate Pavić, but lost to Peers and Polášek in the quarterfinals. Zeballos played alongside Marcel Granollers, but lost to Fabio Fognini and Lorenzo Sonego in the first round.

Mektić usurped his doubles partner Pavić for the ATP No. 1 doubles ranking after the event, as the latter dropped points from the 2019 Shanghai Masters.

== Seeds ==
1. (Croatia) Nikola Mektić / (Croatia) Mate Pavić (quarterfinals)
2. (United States) Rajeev Ram / (United Kingdom) Joe Salisbury (second round)
3. (Spain) Marcel Granollers / (Argentina) Horacio Zeballos (first round)
4. (Colombia) Juan Sebastián Cabal / (Colombia) Robert Farah (first round)
5. (Germany) Kevin Krawietz / (Romania) Horia Tecău (quarterfinals)
6. (United Kingdom) Jamie Murray / (Brazil) Bruno Soares (first round)
7. (Australia) John Peers / (Slovakia) Filip Polášek (champions)
8. (Croatia) Ivan Dodig / (Brazil) Marcelo Melo (semifinals)

== Draw ==
Key

- Q = Qualifier
- WC = Wild card
- LL = Lucky loser
- Alt = Alternate
- ITF = ITF entry
- PR = Protected ranking
- SR = Special ranking
- SE = Special exempt
- JE = Junior exempt
- JR = Junior Accelerator Programme entrant
- CO = College Accelerator Programme entrant
- NG = Next Gen Accelerator Program entrant
- w/o = Walkover
- r = Retired
- d = Defaulted

=== Finals ===
Semifinals
7	(Australia) John Peers (Slovakia) Filip Polášek	6	7^{7}
8	(Croatia) Ivan Dodig (Brazil) Marcelo Melo	4	6^{1}
(Russia) Aslan Karatsev (Russia) Andrey Rublev	6	4	[10]
(Germany) Tim Pütz (New Zealand) Michael Venus	3	6	[5]

Final
7	(Australia) John Peers (Slovakia) Filip Polášek	6	7^{7}
(Russia) Aslan Karatsev (Russia) Andrey Rublev	3	6^{5}

=== Top half ===
First round
1	(Croatia) N Mektić (Croatia) M Pavić	6	6
WC	(United States) M McDonald (United States) B Nakashima	2	2
(South Africa) R Klaasen (Japan) B McLachlan	2	6	[9]
(El Salvador) M Arévalo (Netherlands) M Middelkoop	6	0	[11]
(Netherlands) W Koolhof (Netherlands) J-J Rojer	1	7^{7}	[10]
PR	(United States) A Krajicek (Germany) A Mies	6	6^{4}	[5]
(Uruguay) A Behar (Ecuador) G Escobar	5	7^{7}	[7]
7	(Australia) J Peers (Slovakia) F Polášek	7	6^{1}	[10]
3	(Spain) M Granollers (Argentina) H Zeballos	6	3	[8]
(Italy) F Fognini (Italy) L Sonego	3	6	[10]
(United Kingdom) D Evans (United Kingdom) N Skupski	3	4
WC	(United States) J Isner (United States) J Sock	6	6
(Spain) R Bautista Agut (Spain) A Davidovich Fokina	6	3	[9]
(Belgium) S Gillé (Belgium) J Vliegen	4	6	[11]
(Chile) C Garín (Mexico) S González	7^{8}	5	[2]
8	(Croatia) I Dodig (Brazil) M Melo	6^{6}	7	[10]

Second round
1	(Croatia) N Mektić (Croatia) M Pavić	6	6
(El Salvador) M Arévalo (Netherlands) M Middelkoop	1	3
(Netherlands) W Koolhof (Netherlands) J-J Rojer	4	6^{5}
7	(Australia) J Peers (Slovakia) F Polášek	6	7^{7}
(Italy) F Fognini (Italy) L Sonego	w/o
WC	(United States) J Isner (United States) J Sock
(Belgium) S Gillé (Belgium) J Vliegen	4	6	[5]
8	(Croatia) I Dodig (Brazil) M Melo	6	4	[10]

Quarterfinals
1	(Croatia) N Mektić (Croatia) M Pavić	2	3
7	(Australia) J Peers (Slovakia) F Polášek	6	6
(Italy) F Fognini (Italy) L Sonego	3	6	[8]
8	(Croatia) I Dodig (Brazil) M Melo	6	4	[10]

Semifinals
7	(Australia) J Peers (Slovakia) F Polášek	6	7^{7}
8	(Croatia) I Dodig (Brazil) M Melo	4	6^{1}

=== Bottom half ===
First round
6	(United Kingdom) J Murray (Brazil) B Soares	4	4
(Germany) J-L Struff (Germany) A Zverev	6	6
(India) R Bopanna (Canada) D Shapovalov	6	2	[10]
(Canada) F Auger-Aliassime (Poland) H Hurkacz	1	6	[4]
(Russia) A Karatsev (Russia) A Rublev	6	6
(Australia) A de Minaur (United States) R Opelka	4	4
(Italy) S Bolelli (Argentina) M González	2	6	[11]
4	(Colombia) JS Cabal (Colombia) R Farah	6	3	[9]
5	(Germany) K Krawietz (Romania) H Tecău	6	6
Alt	(Serbia) F Krajinović (Serbia) D Lajović	2	3
(South Africa) L Harris (Argentina) D Schwartzman	3	7^{7}	[7]
WC	(United States) S Johnson (United States) S Querrey	6	6^{2}	[10]
(Germany) T Pütz (New Zealand) M Venus	7	6^{5}	[15]
(Spain) C Alcaraz (Spain) P Carreño Busta	5	7^{7}	[13]
(United Kingdom) C Norrie (Australia) L Saville	6	3	[8]
2	(United States) R Ram (United Kingdom) J Salisbury	4	6	[10]

Second round
(Germany) J-L Struff (Germany) A Zverev	5	3
(India) R Bopanna (Canada) D Shapovalov	7	6
(Russia) A Karatsev (Russia) A Rublev	6	5	[10]
(Italy) S Bolelli (Argentina) M González	3	7	[3]
5	(Germany) K Krawietz (Romania) H Tecău	7^{9}	7^{7}
WC	(United States) S Johnson (United States) S Querrey	6^{7}	6^{4}
(Germany) T Pütz (New Zealand) M Venus	4	6	[10]
2	(United States) R Ram (United Kingdom) J Salisbury	6	4	[6]

Quarterfinals
(India) R Bopanna (Canada) D Shapovalov	4	4
(Russia) A Karatsev (Russia) A Rublev	6	6
5	(Germany) K Krawietz (Romania) H Tecău	4	2
(Germany) T Pütz (New Zealand) M Venus	6	6

Semifinals
(Russia) A Karatsev (Russia) A Rublev	6	4	[10]
(Germany) T Pütz (New Zealand) M Venus	3	6	[5]
