= 2021 BNP Paribas Open – Women's singles =

Women's singles
- 2021 BNP Paribas Open

Final
- Champion: (Spain) Paula Badosa
- Runner-up: (Belarus) Victoria Azarenka
- Score: 7–6^{(7–5)}, 2–6, 7–6^{(7–2)}

Details
- Draw: 96 (12Q, 6WC, 1PR)
- Seeds: 32

Events
Singles	men	women
Doubles	men	women
← 2019 ·	Indian Wells Open	· 2022 →

Paula Badosa defeated Victoria Azarenka in the final, 7–6^{(7–5)}, 2–6, 7–6^{(7–2)} to win the women's singles tennis title at the 2021 Indian Wells Masters. It was her first WTA 1000 title and second career WTA Tour singles title. Badosa was the first Spanish woman to win the title. Azarenka was aiming to become the first woman to win the title three times. At three hours and four minutes, it was the longest-ever Indian Wells women's final.

Bianca Andreescu was the defending champion from when the tournament was last held in 2019, but lost in the third round to Anett Kontaveit. Two-time champion Kim Clijsters made her return to the event for the first time since 2011; she lost in the first round to Kateřina Siniaková. Lucky loser Beatriz Haddad Maia became the first Brazilian woman to defeat a player ranked in the world's top three, defeating world No. 3 Karolína Plíšková in the third round. By reaching the semifinals, Ons Jabeur became the first Arab player to enter the top 10 of the world rankings.

== Seeds ==
All seeds receive a bye into the second round.

1. (Czech Republic) Karolína Plíšková (third round)
2. (Poland) Iga Świątek (fourth round)
3. (Czech Republic) Barbora Krejčíková (fourth round)
4. (Ukraine) Elina Svitolina (fourth round)
5. (Spain) Garbiñe Muguruza (second round)
6. (Greece) Maria Sakkari (second round)
7. (Czech Republic) Petra Kvitová (third round)
8. (Switzerland) Belinda Bencic (withdrew)
9. (Russia) Anastasia Pavlyuchenkova (third round)
10. (Germany) Angelique Kerber (quarterfinals)
11. (Romania) Simona Halep (third round)
12. (Tunisia) Ons Jabeur (semifinals)
13. (Kazakhstan) Elena Rybakina (second round)
14. (Belgium) Elise Mertens (second round)
15. (United States) Coco Gauff (third round)
16. (Canada) Bianca Andreescu (third round)

17. (United Kingdom) Emma Raducanu (second round)
18. (Estonia) Anett Kontaveit (quarterfinals)
19. (United States) Jessica Pegula (quarterfinals)
20. (Russia) Daria Kasatkina (third round)
21. (Spain) Paula Badosa (champion)
22. (United States) Danielle Collins (third round)
23. (Canada) Leylah Fernandez (fourth round)
24. (Latvia) Jeļena Ostapenko (semifinals)
25. (Russia) Veronika Kudermetova (third round)
26. (Slovenia) Tamara Zidanšek (third round)
27. (Belarus) Victoria Azarenka (final)
28. (Spain) Sara Sorribes Tormo (second round)
29. (Argentina) Nadia Podoroska (withdrew)
30. (Italy) Camila Giorgi (second round)
31. (Switzerland) Jil Teichmann (second round)
32. (Romania) Sorana Cîrstea (third round)

Click on the seed number of a player to go to their draw section.

== Draw ==
=== Key ===
- Q = Qualifier
- WC = Wild card
- LL = Lucky loser
- Alt = Alternate
- SE = Special exempt
- PR = Protected ranking
- ITF = ITF entry
- JE = Junior exempt
- w/o = Walkover
- r = Retired
- d = Defaulted
- SR = Special ranking

=== Finals ===
Quarterfinals
18	(Estonia) Anett Kontaveit	5	3
12	(Tunisia) Ons Jabeur	7	6
21	(Spain) Paula Badosa	6	7
10	(Germany) Angelique Kerber	4	5
27	(Belarus) Victoria Azarenka	6	6
19	(United States) Jessica Pegula	4	2
(United States) Shelby Rogers	4	6	3
24	(Latvia) Jeļena Ostapenko	6	4	6

Semifinals
12	(Tunisia) Ons Jabeur	3	3
21	(Spain) Paula Badosa	6	6
27	(Belarus) Victoria Azarenka	3	6	7
24	(Latvia) Jeļena Ostapenko	6	3	5

Final
21	(Spain) Paula Badosa	7^{7}	2	7^{7}
27	(Belarus) Victoria Azarenka	6^{5}	6	6^{2}

=== Top half ===
==== Section 1 ====
First round
PR	(China) S Zheng	1	4
Q	(Poland) M Fręch	6	6
(Egypt) M Sherif	6	6
(Montenegro) D Kovinić	1	3
Q	(Italy) M Trevisan	6	6^{8}	6
(Czech Republic) M Bouzková	4	7^{10}	4
Q	(Chinese Taipei) E-s Liang	2	2
(United States) A Riske	6	6

Second round
1	(Czech Republic) Ka Plíšková	7	6
Q	(Poland) M Fręch	5	2
(Egypt) M Sherif	3	0
LL	(Brazil) B Haddad Maia	6	6
18	(Estonia) A Kontaveit	6	5
Q	(Italy) M Trevisan	3	2^{r}
(United States) A Riske	6^{2}	7	2
16	(Canada) B Andreescu	7^{7}	5	6

Third round
1	(Czech Republic) Ka Plíšková	3	5
LL	(Brazil) B Haddad Maia	6	7
18	(Estonia) A Kontaveit	7^{7}	6
16	(Canada) B Andreescu	6^{5}	3

Fourth round
LL	(Brazil) B Haddad Maia	0	2
18	(Estonia) A Kontaveit	6	6

==== Section 2 ====
First round
(Latvia) A Sevastova	3	6	6
(Slovenia) P Hercog	6	2	0
(United States) L Davis	6	7
(Spain) N Párrizas Díaz	2	5
WC	(United States) C Liu	3	6	1
Q	(Russia) A Kalinskaya	6	2	6
(Czech Republic) M Vondroušová	1	6	3
(Switzerland) V Golubic	6	4	6

Second round
12	(Tunisia) O Jabeur	6	6^{5}	6
(Latvia) A Sevastova	2	7^{7}	3
(United States) L Davis	1	0^{r}
22	(United States) D Collins	6	0
28	(Spain) S Sorribes Tormo	3	6	2
Q	(Russia) A Kalinskaya	6	4	6
(Switzerland) V Golubic	5	6	6
6	(Greece) M Sakkari	7	3	2

Third round
12	(Tunisia) O Jabeur	6	6
22	(United States) D Collins	1	3
Q	(Russia) A Kalinskaya	1	6	6
(Switzerland) V Golubic	6	1	3

Fourth round
12	(Tunisia) O Jabeur	6	6
Q	(Russia) A Kalinskaya	2	2

==== Section 3 ====
First round
(Japan) N Hibino	3	3
Q	(Kazakhstan) Z Diyas	6	6
(United States) A Anisimova	6	6
WC	(United States) K Scott	1	1
WC	(France) E Jacquemot	2	4
(Ukraine) D Yastremska	6	6
(France) C Garcia	5	6	6
Q	(Belgium) K Flipkens	7	4	0

Second round
3	(Czech Republic) B Krejčíková	6	3	6
Q	(Kazakhstan) Z Diyas	4	6	1
(United States) A Anisimova	6	6
30	(Italy) C Giorgi	4	1
21	(Spain) P Badosa	6	2	6
(Ukraine) D Yastremska	4	6	2
(France) C Garcia	3	7^{7}	1
15	(United States) C Gauff	6	6^{2}	6

Third round
3	(Czech Republic) B Krejčíková	6	6
(United States) A Anisimova	2	3
21	(Spain) P Badosa	6	6
15	(United States) C Gauff	2	2

Fourth round
3	(Czech Republic) B Krejčíková	1	5
21	(Spain) P Badosa	6	7

==== Section 4 ====
First round
(Czech Republic) K Siniaková	6	2	6
WC	(Belgium) K Clijsters	1	6	2
(Croatia) D Vekić	4	6	3
Q	(Australia) A Sharma	6	2	6
(Slovakia) AK Schmiedlová	2	2
(Croatia) A Konjuh	6	6
Q	(United States) UM Arconada	0	2
(Australia) A Tomljanović	6	6

Second round
10	(Germany) A Kerber	6	6^{4}	7
(Czech Republic) K Siniaková	1	7^{7}	5
Q	(Australia) A Sharma	4^{r}
20	(Russia) D Kasatkina	3
26	(Slovenia) T Zidanšek	6	5	6
(Croatia) A Konjuh	4	7	3
(Australia) A Tomljanović	6	1	6
5	(Spain) G Muguruza	3	6	3

Third round
10	(Germany) A Kerber	6	1	6
20	(Russia) D Kasatkina	2	6	4
26	(Slovenia) T Zidanšek	4	3
(Australia) A Tomljanović	6	6

Fourth round
10	(Germany) A Kerber	6	6
(Australia) A Tomljanović	4	1

=== Bottom half ===
==== Section 5 ====
First round
(Netherlands) A Rus	6	6
Q	(United States) A Parks	0	1
(Poland) M Linette	3	6	6
(Sweden) R Peterson	6	3	2
(Colombia) C Osorio	0	4
(Belarus) A Sasnovich	6	6
(Ukraine) M Kostyuk	6	1	6
(China) S Zhang	3	6	2

Second round
7	(Czech Republic) P Kvitová	6	6
(Netherlands) A Rus	2	2
(Poland) M Linette	5	0^{r}
27	(Belarus) V Azarenka	7	3
17/WC	(United Kingdom) E Raducanu	2	4
(Belarus) A Sasnovich	6	6
(Ukraine) M Kostyuk	6^{2}	1
11	(Romania) S Halep	7^{7}	6

Third round
7	(Czech Republic) P Kvitová	5	4
27	(Belarus) V Azarenka	7	6
(Belarus) A Sasnovich	7	6
11	(Romania) S Halep	5	4

Fourth round
27	(Belarus) V Azarenka	6	6
(Belarus) A Sasnovich	3	4

==== Section 6 ====
First round
Q	(Japan) M Hontama	0	6	2
LL	(Italy) J Paolini	6	3	6
(United States) S Stephens	6^{5}	7	6
(United Kingdom) H Watson	7^{7}	5	1
(United States) A Li	2	7	5
(Japan) M Doi	6	5	7
(Czech Republic) T Martincová	6	7^{7}
WC	(United States) A Krueger	2	6^{1}

Second round
14	(Belgium) E Mertens	6	4	4
LL	(Italy) J Paolini	3	6	6
(United States) S Stephens	2	3
19	(United States) J Pegula	6	6
32	(Romania) S Cîrstea	6	6
(Japan) M Doi	2	3
(Czech Republic) T Martincová	2	5
4	(Ukraine) E Svitolina	6	7

Third round
LL	(Italy) J Paolini	4	1
19	(United States) J Pegula	6	6
32	(Romania) S Cîrstea	6	4	6^{3}
4	(Ukraine) E Svitolina	4	6	7^{7}

Fourth round
19	(United States) J Pegula	6	6
4	(Ukraine) E Svitolina	1	1

==== Section 7 ====
First round
(United States) S Rogers	7^{7}	6
(Ukraine) A Kalinina	6^{2}	2
(Romania) I-C Begu	6	7^{7}
(France) F Ferro	2	6^{2}
Q	(Romania) E-G Ruse	3	6^{5}
(France) A Cornet	6	7^{7}
(Estonia) K Kanepi	0	5
(United States) M Keys	6	7

Second round
LL	(Slovakia) K Kučová	2	2
(United States) S Rogers	6	6
(Romania) I-C Begu	7	6
31	(Switzerland) J Teichmann	5	1
23	(Canada) L Fernandez	6	6
(France) A Cornet	2	3
(United States) M Keys	3	1
9	(Russia) A Pavlyuchenkova	6	6

Third round
(United States) S Rogers	6	6
(Romania) I-C Begu	0	2
23	(Canada) L Fernandez	5	6	6
9	(Russia) A Pavlyuchenkova	7	3	4

Fourth round
(United States) S Rogers	2	6	7^{7}
23	(Canada) L Fernandez	6	1	6^{4}

==== Section 8 ====
First round
(Germany) A Petkovic	6^{2}	1
(Kazakhstan) Y Putintseva	7^{7}	6
(United States) M Brengle	1	6^{4}
(Chinese Taipei) S-w Hsieh	6	7^{7}
Q	(Ukraine) K Kozlova	4	6^{6}
(Russia) L Samsonova	6	7^{8}
WC	(United States) K Volynets	4	4
(Croatia) P Martić	6	6

Second round
13	(Kazakhstan) E Rybakina	2	6^{5}
(Kazakhstan) Y Putintseva	6	7^{7}
(Chinese Taipei) S-w Hsieh	3	0
24	(Latvia) J Ostapenko	6	6
25	(Russia) V Kudermetova	6	6
(Russia) L Samsonova	2	3
(Croatia) P Martić	1	3
2	(Poland) I Świątek	6	6

Third round
(Kazakhstan) Y Putintseva	3	6	3
24	(Latvia) J Ostapenko	6	2	6
25	(Russia) V Kudermetova	1	0
2	(Poland) I Świątek	6	6

Fourth round
24	(Latvia) J Ostapenko	6	6
2	(Poland) I Świątek	4	3

== Qualifying ==
=== Seeds ===
1. (Italy) Jasmine Paolini (qualifying competition, lucky loser)
2. (Italy) Martina Trevisan (qualified)
3. (Romania) Elena-Gabriela Ruse (qualified)
4. (Australia) Astra Sharma (qualified)
5. (Poland) Magdalena Fręch (qualified)
6. (Kazakhstan) Zarina Diyas (qualified)
7. (Slovakia) Kristína Kučová (qualifying competition, lucky loser)
8. (Bulgaria) Viktoriya Tomova (first round, retired)
9. (Brazil) Beatriz Haddad Maia (qualifying competition, lucky loser)
10. (China) Wang Xinyu (first round)
11. (Australia) Maddison Inglis (qualifying competition)
12. (Belgium) Kirsten Flipkens (qualified)
13. (Belarus) Olga Govortsova (qualifying competition)
14. (Hungary) Panna Udvardy (first round)
15. (Ukraine) Kateryna Kozlova (qualified)
16. (United States) CoCo Vandeweghe (first round)
17. (Netherlands) Lesley Pattinama Kerkhove (qualifying competition)
18. (Australia) Arina Rodionova (first round)
19. (Russia) Anna Kalinskaya (qualified)
20. (United Kingdom) Katie Boulter (first round)
21. (Canada) Rebecca Marino (qualifying competition)
22. (United States) Grace Min (first round)
23. (Poland) Katarzyna Kawa (qualifying competition)
24. (Switzerland) Leonie Küng (first round)

=== Qualifiers ===
1. (Ukraine) Kateryna Kozlova
2. (Italy) Martina Trevisan
3. (Romania) Elena-Gabriela Ruse
4. (Australia) Astra Sharma
5. (Poland) Magdalena Fręch
6. (Kazakhstan) Zarina Diyas
7. (Japan) Mai Hontama
8. (Russia) Anna Kalinskaya
9. (United States) Usue Maitane Arconada
10. (Chinese Taipei) Liang En-shuo
11. (United States) Alycia Parks
12. (Belgium) Kirsten Flipkens

=== Lucky losers ===
1. (Italy) Jasmine Paolini
2. (Slovakia) Kristína Kučová
3. (Brazil) Beatriz Haddad Maia

=== Qualifying draw ===
==== First qualifier ====
First round
1	(Italy) Jasmine Paolini	6	6
(Russia) Natalia Vikhlyantseva	1	4
(Germany) Tatjana Maria	3	1
15	(Ukraine) Kateryna Kozlova	6	6

Qualifying competition
1	(Italy) Jasmine Paolini	1	3
15	(Ukraine) Kateryna Kozlova	6	6

==== Second qualifier ====
First round
2	(Italy) Martina Trevisan	6	6
(United States) Hailey Baptiste	2	4
WC	(United States) Reese Brantmeier	7	6
20	(United Kingdom) Katie Boulter	5	2

Qualifying competition
2	(Italy) Martina Trevisan	6	6
WC	(United States) Reese Brantmeier	1	2

==== Third qualifier ====
First round
3	(Romania) Elena-Gabriela Ruse	7	6
WC	(United States) Ellie Douglas	5	2
(United States) Sachia Vickery	2	7	3
17	(Netherlands) Lesley Pattinama Kerkhove	6	5	6

Qualifying competition
3	(Romania) Elena-Gabriela Ruse	6	6
17	(Netherlands) Lesley Pattinama Kerkhove	3	2

==== Fourth qualifier ====
First round
4	(Australia) Astra Sharma	4	6	6
WC	(United States) Elvina Kalieva	6	1	3
WC	(United States) Peyton Stearns	6	7
16	(United States) CoCo Vandeweghe	4	5

Qualifying competition
4	(Australia) Astra Sharma	7	6
WC	(United States) Peyton Stearns	5	0

==== Fifth qualifier ====
First round
5	(Poland) Magdalena Fręch	7^{7}	6
(Australia) Lizette Cabrera	6^{2}	2
(United States) Francesca Di Lorenzo	1	2
21	(Canada) Rebecca Marino	6	6

Qualifying competition
5	(Poland) Magdalena Fręch	6	4	6
21	(Canada) Rebecca Marino	3	6	3

==== Sixth qualifier ====
First round
6	(Kazakhstan) Zarina Diyas	6	6
(Japan) Kurumi Nara	4	3
(Japan) Mayo Hibi	2	6	1
13	(Belarus) Olga Govortsova	6	3	6

Qualifying competition
6	(Kazakhstan) Zarina Diyas	6	6
13	(Belarus) Olga Govortsova	3	3

==== Seventh qualifier ====
First round
7	(Slovakia) Kristína Kučová	6	6
PR	(China) Yuan Yue	2	1
(Japan) Mai Hontama	7	7
14	(Hungary) Panna Udvardy	5	5

Qualifying competition
7	(Slovakia) Kristína Kučová	3	4
(Japan) Mai Hontama	6	6

==== Eighth qualifier ====
First round
8	(Bulgaria) Viktoriya Tomova	3	0^{r}
PR	(Australia) Priscilla Hon	6	4
(United States) Asia Muhammad	1	2
19	(Russia) Anna Kalinskaya	6	6

Qualifying competition
PR	(Australia) Priscilla Hon	4	5
19	(Russia) Anna Kalinskaya	6	7

==== Ninth qualifier ====
First round
9	(Brazil) Beatriz Haddad Maia	6	6
(Italy) Lucrezia Stefanini	4	1
WC	(United States) Usue Maitane Arconada	6	6
18	(Australia) Arina Rodionova	3	0

Qualifying competition
9	(Brazil) Beatriz Haddad Maia	6	4	0
WC	(United States) Usue Maitane Arconada	4	6	6

==== Tenth qualifier ====
First round
10	(China) Wang Xinyu	6^{4}	6	4
PR	(Chinese Taipei) Liang En-shuo	7^{7}	3	6
(United States) Caroline Dolehide	7	6
22	(United States) Grace Min	5	1

Qualifying competition
PR	(Chinese Taipei) Liang En-shuo	6	6^{2}	6
(United States) Caroline Dolehide	4	7^{7}	3

==== Eleventh qualifier ====
First round
11	(Australia) Maddison Inglis	7^{7}	6
(Georgia (country)) Mariam Bolkvadze	6^{2}	2
(United States) Alycia Parks	6^{4}	6	7^{7}
24	(Switzerland) Leonie Küng	7^{7}	1	6^{1}

Qualifying competition
11	(Australia) Maddison Inglis	3	4
(United States) Alycia Parks	6	6

==== Twelfth qualifier ====
First round
12	(Belgium) Kirsten Flipkens	5	7^{7}	6
WC	(United States) Theadora Rabman	7	6^{3}	1
(Argentina) Paula Ormaechea	3	1
23	(Poland) Katarzyna Kawa	6	6

Qualifying competition
12	(Belgium) Kirsten Flipkens	2	6	6
23	(Poland) Katarzyna Kawa	6	2	3
