= 2019 BNP Paribas Open – Women's singles =

Women's singles
- 2019 BNP Paribas Open

Final
- Champion: (Canada) Bianca Andreescu
- Runner-up: (Germany) Angelique Kerber
- Score: 6–4, 3–6, 6–4

Details
- Draw: 96
- Seeds: 32

Events
Singles	men	women
Doubles	men	women
← 2018 ·	Indian Wells Open	· 2021 →

Bianca Andreescu defeated Angelique Kerber in the final, 6–4, 3–6, 6–4 to win the women's singles tennis title at the 2019 Indian Wells Open. It was her first WTA Tour title, and she was the first wildcard champion in tournament history. This marked the second consecutive year when a player won the tournament as her first WTA Tour singles title.

Naomi Osaka was the defending champion, but lost to Belinda Bencic in the fourth round. Osaka retained the world No. 1 singles ranking despite failing to defend her title. Petra Kvitová, Simona Halep, Sloane Stephens and Karolína Plíšková were also in contention for the top ranking.

== Seeds ==
All seeds received a bye into the second round.

1. (Japan) Naomi Osaka (fourth round)
2. (Romania) Simona Halep (fourth round)
3. (Czech Republic) Petra Kvitová (second round)
4. (United States) Sloane Stephens (second round)
5. (Czech Republic) Karolína Plíšková (quarterfinals)
6. (Ukraine) Elina Svitolina (semifinals)
7. (Netherlands) Kiki Bertens (fourth round)
8. (Germany) Angelique Kerber (final)
9. (Belarus) Aryna Sabalenka (fourth round)
10. (United States) Serena Williams (third round, retired)
11. (Latvia) Anastasija Sevastova (third round, retired)
12. (Australia) Ashleigh Barty (fourth round)
13. (Denmark) Caroline Wozniacki (second round)
14. (Russia) Daria Kasatkina (second round)
15. (Germany) Julia Görges (third round)
16. (Belgium) Elise Mertens (third round)

17. (United States) Madison Keys (second round)
18. (China) Wang Qiang (fourth round)
19. (France) Caroline Garcia (second round)
20. (Spain) Garbiñe Muguruza (quarterfinals)
21. (Estonia) Anett Kontaveit (fourth round)
22. (Latvia) Jeļena Ostapenko (third round)
23. (Switzerland) Belinda Bencic (semifinals)
24. (Ukraine) Lesia Tsurenko (third round)
25. (United States) Danielle Collins (third round)
26. (Spain) Carla Suárez Navarro (second round)
27. (Chinese Taipei) Hsieh Su-wei (second round)
28. (Croatia) Donna Vekić (second round)
29. (Romania) Mihaela Buzărnescu (second round)
30. (Russia) Anastasia Pavlyuchenkova (second round)
31. (Belarus) Aliaksandra Sasnovich (second round)
32. (Slovakia) Dominika Cibulková (second round)

Click on the seed number of a player to go to their draw section.

== Draw ==
=== Key ===
- Q = Qualifier
- WC = Wild card
- LL = Lucky loser
- Alt = Alternate
- SE = Special exempt
- PR = Protected ranking
- ITF = ITF entry
- JE = Junior exempt
- w/o = Walkover
- r = Retired
- d = Defaulted
- SR = Special ranking

=== Finals ===
Quarterfinals
23	(Switzerland) Belinda Bencic	6	4	6
5	(Czech Republic) Karolína Plíšková	3	6	3
(United States) Venus Williams	6^{3}	3
8	(Germany) Angelique Kerber	7^{7}	6
20	(Spain) Garbiñe Muguruza	0	1
WC	(Canada) Bianca Andreescu	6	6
6	(Ukraine) Elina Svitolina	4	6	6
(Czech Republic) Markéta Vondroušová	6	4	4

Semifinals
23	(Switzerland) Belinda Bencic	4	2
8	(Germany) Angelique Kerber	6	6
WC	(Canada) Bianca Andreescu	6	2	6
6	(Ukraine) Elina Svitolina	3	6	4

Final
8	(Germany) Angelique Kerber	4	6	4
WC	(Canada) Bianca Andreescu	6	3	6

=== Top half ===
==== Section 1 ====
First round
(France) K Mladenovic	7	6
(China) S Zheng	5	2
(Belgium) K Flipkens	7	3	7
(Canada) E Bouchard	5	6	5
(United States) A Riske	6^{1}	4
(Belgium) A Van Uytvanck	7^{7}	6
(Sweden) R Peterson	5	6	2
(Russia) E Alexandrova	7	3	6

Second round
1	(Japan) N Osaka	6	6
(France) K Mladenovic	3	4
(Belgium) K Flipkens	4	1
25	(United States) D Collins	6	6
23	(Switzerland) B Bencic	6	6
(Belgium) A Van Uytvanck	4	1
(Russia) E Alexandrova	7	2	7
13	(Denmark) C Wozniacki	5	6	5

Third round
1	(Japan) N Osaka	6	6
25	(United States) D Collins	4	2
23	(Switzerland) B Bencic	6	6
(Russia) E Alexandrova	4	2

Fourth round
1	(Japan) N Osaka	3	1
23	(Switzerland) B Bencic	6	6

==== Section 2 ====
First round
WC	(United States) M Brengle	6	6
(Australia) S Stosur	2	3
(Puerto Rico) M Puig	6	6
(Russia) E Rodina	0	4
Q	(Belgium) Y Bonaventure	6^{3}	7	6
WC	(United States) T Townsend	7^{7}	5	2
Q	(Japan) M Doi	6	6
(Tunisia) O Jabeur	3	3

Second round
11	(Latvia) A Sevastova	6	6
WC	(United States) M Brengle	3	4
(Puerto Rico) M Puig	3	6^{4}
21	(Estonia) A Kontaveit	6	7^{7}
28	(Croatia) D Vekić	6	6^{5}	4
Q	(Belgium) Y Bonaventure	1	7^{7}	6
Q	(Japan) M Doi	7^{7}	1	1
5	(Czech Republic) Ka Plíšková	6^{4}	6	6

Third round
11	(Latvia) A Sevastova	0^{r}
21	(Estonia) A Kontaveit	5
Q	(Belgium) Y Bonaventure	3	2
5	(Czech Republic) Ka Plíšková	6	6

Fourth round
21	(Estonia) A Kontaveit	6^{0}	6	2
5	(Czech Republic) Ka Plíšková	7^{7}	4	6

==== Section 3 ====
First round
(United States) V Williams	6	0	6
(Germany) A Petkovic	4	6	3
Q	(United States) C McHale	7	6
(Greece) M Sakkari	5	0
Q	(China) L Zhu	4	7^{7}	5
(Germany) M Barthel	6	6^{4}	7
(Sweden) J Larsson	2	2
(Estonia) K Kanepi	6	6

Second round
3	(Czech Republic) P Kvitová	6	5	4
(United States) V Williams	4	7	6
Q	(United States) C McHale	6	3	6
30	(Russia) A Pavlyuchenkova	4	6	4
17	(United States) M Keys	6	1	5
(Germany) M Barthel	3	6	7
(Estonia) K Kanepi	3	6	3
15	(Germany) J Görges	6	2	6

Third round
(United States) V Williams	6	7
Q	(United States) C McHale	2	5
(Germany) M Barthel	7	1	6
15	(Germany) J Görges	5	6	4

Fourth round
(United States) V Williams	6	6
(Germany) M Barthel	4	4

==== Section 4 ====
First round
(Australia) A Tomljanović	7	6
(France) A Cornet	5	3
WC	(United States) J Pegula	6	6
Q	(Kazakhstan) Z Diyas	1	1
Q	(Russia) N Vikhlyantseva	6	6
Q	(Australia) P Hon	1	1
(Kazakhstan) Y Putintseva	6	6
(Hungary) T Babos	1	3

Second round
9	(Belarus) A Sabalenka	6	4	6
(Australia) A Tomljanović	3	6	0
WC	(United States) J Pegula	6	5	4
24	(Ukraine) L Tsurenko	3	7	6
26	(Spain) C Suárez Navarro	2	0
Q	(Russia) N Vikhlyantseva	6	6
(Kazakhstan) Y Putintseva	0	2
8	(Germany) A Kerber	6	6

Third round
9	(Belarus) A Sabalenka	6	7
24	(Ukraine) L Tsurenko	2	5
Q	(Russia) N Vikhlyantseva	6	1	3
8	(Germany) A Kerber	3	6	6

Fourth round
9	(Belarus) A Sabalenka	1	6	4
8	(Germany) A Kerber	6	4	6

=== Bottom half ===
==== Section 5 ====
First round
(Croatia) P Martić	3	6	6^{5}
(Poland) M Linette	6	4	7^{7}
(United Kingdom) J Konta	6	6
(France) P Parmentier	2	3
(Slovakia) AK Schmiedlová	6^{2}	2
WC	(United States) L Davis	7^{7}	6
(Belarus) V Lapko	2	3
(Belarus) V Azarenka	6	6

Second round
7	(Netherlands) K Bertens	6	6
(Poland) M Linette	4	1
(United Kingdom) J Konta	6	6
27	(Chinese Taipei) S-w Hsieh	0	2
20	(Spain) G Muguruza	6	6
WC	(United States) L Davis	1	3
(Belarus) V Azarenka	5	3
10	(United States) S Williams	7	6

Third round
7	(Netherlands) K Bertens	7^{12}	6
(United Kingdom) J Konta	6^{10}	4
20	(Spain) G Muguruza	6	1
10	(United States) S Williams	3	0^{r}

Fourth round
7	(Netherlands) K Bertens	7	1	4
20	(Spain) G Muguruza	5	6	6

==== Section 6 ====
First round
(Serbia) A Krunić	0	4
WC	(United States) A Anisimova	6	6
(United States) B Pera	6	6
Q	(United States) C McNally	2	1
WC	(Canada) B Andreescu	6^{3}	6	6
(Romania) I-C Begu	7^{7}	3	3
Q	(Switzerland) S Vögele	7	6
WC	(United States) S Vickery	5	2

Second round
16	(Belgium) E Mertens	6	6
WC	(United States) A Anisimova	4	2
(United States) B Pera	6^{5}	2
18	(China) Q Wang	7^{7}	6
32	(Slovakia) D Cibulková	2	2
WC	(Canada) B Andreescu	6	6
Q	(Switzerland) S Vögele	6	6
4	(United States) S Stephens	3	0

Third round
16	(Belgium) E Mertens	6^{4}	7^{7}	3
18	(China) Q Wang	7^{7}	6^{4}	6
WC	(Canada) B Andreescu	6	6
Q	(Switzerland) S Vögele	1	2

Fourth round
18	(China) Q Wang	5	2
WC	(Canada) B Andreescu	7	6

==== Section 7 ====
First round
(China) Y Wang	6	5	4
(United States) S Kenin	1	7	6
(Australia) D Gavrilova	6	5	6
(Ukraine) D Yastremska	2	7	2
Q	(Japan) N Hibino	5	3
WC	(United States) J Brady	7	6
(Germany) T Maria	6	6
(Slovakia) M Rybáriková	3	2

Second round
6	(Ukraine) E Svitolina	3	7^{7}	6
(United States) S Kenin	6	6^{5}	4
(Australia) D Gavrilova	6	6
29	(Romania) M Buzărnescu	2	2
19	(France) C Garcia	3	6	0
WC	(United States) J Brady	6	3	6
(Germany) T Maria	4	4
12	(Australia) A Barty	6	6

Third round
6	(Ukraine) E Svitolina	7	6
(Australia) D Gavrilova	5	4
WC	(United States) J Brady	3	2
12	(Australia) A Barty	6	6

Fourth round
6	(Ukraine) E Svitolina	7^{10}	5	6
12	(Australia) A Barty	6^{8}	7	4

==== Section 8 ====
First round
(Czech Republic) M Vondroušová	6	7^{8}
PR	(Germany) L Siegemund	4	6^{6}
(China) S Zhang	6	6
(Slovakia) V Kužmová	2	4
(Czech Republic) K Siniaková	5	2
Q	(Ukraine) K Kozlova	7	6
(Czech Republic) B Strýcová	6	7^{7}
Q	(Switzerland) V Golubic	2	6^{4}

Second round
14	(Russia) D Kasatkina	2	1
(Czech Republic) M Vondroušová	6	6
(China) S Zhang	2	1
22	(Latvia) J Ostapenko	6	6
31	(Belarus) A Sasnovich	4	6	0
Q	(Ukraine) K Kozlova	6	2	6
(Czech Republic) B Strýcová	2	4
2	(Romania) S Halep	6	6

Third round
(Czech Republic) M Vondroušová	4	6	6
22	(Latvia) J Ostapenko	6	3	4
Q	(Ukraine) K Kozlova	6^{3}	5
2	(Romania) S Halep	7^{7}	7

Fourth round
(Czech Republic) M Vondroušová	6	3	6
2	(Romania) S Halep	2	6	2

== Qualifying ==
=== Seeds ===
1. (Russia) Anastasia Potapova (first round)
2. (Spain) Sara Sorribes Tormo (qualifying competition)
3. (Switzerland) Stefanie Vögele (qualified)
4. (Russia) Vera Zvonareva (qualifying competition, retired)
5. (Slovenia) Dalila Jakupović (qualifying competition)
6. (United Kingdom) Katie Boulter (qualifying competition)
7. (Spain) Lara Arruabarrena (first round)
8. (Czech Republic) Kristýna Plíšková (first round)
9. (China) Zhu Lin (qualified)
10. (Kazakhstan) Zarina Diyas (qualified)
11. (Romania) Sorana Cîrstea (qualifying competition)
12. (Luxembourg) Mandy Minella (first round)
13. (Russia) Veronika Kudermetova (qualifying competition)
14. (Switzerland) Viktorija Golubic (qualified)
15. (Russia) Anna Blinkova (qualifying competition)
16. (France) Fiona Ferro (first round)
17. (Russia) Natalia Vikhlyantseva (qualified)
18. (United Kingdom) Heather Watson (first round)
19. (Switzerland) Timea Bacsinszky (qualifying competition)
20. (Ukraine) Kateryna Kozlova (qualified)
21. (Serbia) Olga Danilović (first round)
22. (Japan) Nao Hibino (qualified)
23. (Japan) Misaki Doi (qualified)
24. (Hungary) Fanny Stollár (first round)

=== Qualifiers ===
1. (Australia) Priscilla Hon
2. (Ukraine) Kateryna Kozlova
3. (Switzerland) Stefanie Vögele
4. (United States) Christina McHale
5. (Russia) Natalia Vikhlyantseva
6. (Switzerland) Viktorija Golubic
7. (Belgium) Ysaline Bonaventure
8. (United States) Caty McNally
9. (China) Zhu Lin
10. (Kazakhstan) Zarina Diyas
11. (Japan) Nao Hibino
12. (Japan) Misaki Doi

=== Draw ===
==== First qualifier ====
First round
1	(Russia) Anastasia Potapova	7^{7}	4	0
(Australia) Priscilla Hon	6^{3}	6	6
(Spain) Paula Badosa Gibert	3	2
13	(Russia) Veronika Kudermetova	6	6

Qualifying competition
(Australia) Priscilla Hon	6	6
13	(Russia) Veronika Kudermetova	4	2

==== Second qualifier ====
First round
2	(Spain) Sara Sorribes Tormo	6	6
(Israel) Julia Glushko	2	4
WC	(United States) Ashley Kratzer	4	1
20	(Ukraine) Kateryna Kozlova	6	6

Qualifying competition
2	(Spain) Sara Sorribes Tormo	1	6^{6}
20	(Ukraine) Kateryna Kozlova	6	7^{8}

==== Third qualifier ====
First round
3	(Switzerland) Stefanie Vögele	6	3	6
(United States) Caroline Dolehide	2	6	3
(Italy) Sara Errani	6	6^{3}	6
18	(United Kingdom) Heather Watson	2	7^{7}	4

Qualifying competition
3	(Switzerland) Stefanie Vögele	6	7^{7}
(Italy) Sara Errani	2	6^{4}

==== Fourth qualifier ====
First round
4	(Russia) Vera Zvonareva	6	6
(Russia) Irina Khromacheva	2	3
(United States) Christina McHale	6	3	7
24	(Hungary) Fanny Stollár	0	6	5

Qualifying competition
4	(Russia) Vera Zvonareva	0	0^{r}
(United States) Christina McHale	6	2

==== Fifth qualifier ====
First round
5	(Slovenia) Dalila Jakupović	6	6
(Netherlands) Arantxa Rus	3	4
WC	(South Africa) Zoe Kruger	0	0
17	(Russia) Natalia Vikhlyantseva	6	6

Qualifying competition
5	(Slovenia) Dalila Jakupović	6^{2}	1
17	(Russia) Natalia Vikhlyantseva	7^{7}	6

==== Sixth qualifier ====
First round
6	(United Kingdom) Katie Boulter	7	5	6
(United States) Allie Kiick	5	7	2
(Czech Republic) Marie Bouzková	6^{5}	2
14	(Switzerland) Viktorija Golubic	7^{7}	6

Qualifying competition
6	(United Kingdom) Katie Boulter	4	3
14	(Switzerland) Viktorija Golubic	6	6

==== Seventh qualifier ====
First round
7	(Spain) Lara Arruabarrena	1	7^{8}	2
(Poland) Iga Świątek	6	6^{6}	6
(Belgium) Ysaline Bonaventure	6^{8}	6	6
21	(Serbia) Olga Danilović	7^{10}	4	4

Qualifying competition
(Poland) Iga Świątek	6	2	4
(Belgium) Ysaline Bonaventure	1	6	6

==== Eighth qualifier ====
First round
8	(Czech Republic) Kristýna Plíšková	6	6^{6}	5
WC	(United States) Caty McNally	2	7^{8}	7
(Switzerland) Conny Perrin	7	0	1
19	(Switzerland) Timea Bacsinszky	5	6	6

Qualifying competition
WC	(United States) Caty McNally	4	6	6
19	(Switzerland) Timea Bacsinszky	6	0	4

==== Ninth qualifier ====
First round
9	(China) Zhu Lin	3	6	6
(China) Wang Xiyu	6	2	3
(Romania) Monica Niculescu	5	4
15	(Russia) Anna Blinkova	7	6

Qualifying competition
9	(China) Zhu Lin	4	6	7
15	(Russia) Anna Blinkova	6	4	5

==== Tenth qualifier ====
First round
10	(Kazakhstan) Zarina Diyas	6	7
(United States) Varvara Lepchenko	4	5
(United States) Nicole Gibbs	6	6
16	(France) Fiona Ferro	2	1

Qualifying competition
10	(Kazakhstan) Zarina Diyas	7^{7}	7
(United States) Nicole Gibbs	6^{4}	5

==== Eleventh qualifier ====
First round
11	(Romania) Sorana Cîrstea	6	6
WC	(United States) Danielle Lao	3	4
(United States) Claire Liu	3	3
22	(Japan) Nao Hibino	6	6

Qualifying competition
11	(Romania) Sorana Cîrstea	6	1	0
22	(Japan) Nao Hibino	4	6	6

==== Twelfth qualifier ====
First round
12	(Luxembourg) Mandy Minella	2	3
(Belgium) Yanina Wickmayer	6	6
WC	(United States) Francesca Di Lorenzo	3	4
23	(Japan) Misaki Doi	6	6

Qualifying competition
(Belgium) Yanina Wickmayer	6^{2}	5
23	(Japan) Misaki Doi	7^{7}	7
