= 2019 BNP Paribas Open – Men's singles =

Men's singles
- 2019 BNP Paribas Open

Final
- Champion: (Austria) Dominic Thiem
- Runner-up: (Switzerland) Roger Federer
- Score: 3–6, 6–3, 7–5

Details
- Draw: 96 (12 Q / 5 WC )
- Seeds: 32

Events
Singles	men	women
Doubles	men	women
- Indian Wells Masters

Dominic Thiem defeated Roger Federer in the final, 3–6, 6–3, 7–5 to win the men's singles tennis title at the 2019 Indian Wells Masters. It was his maiden ATP Tour Masters 1000 title, and he became the first Austrian to win a Masters title since Thomas Muster won the 1997 Miami Open.

Juan Martín del Potro was the reigning champion, but withdrew due to a knee injury before the tournament.

== Seeds ==
All seeds received a bye into the second round.

1. (Serbia) Novak Djokovic (third round)
2. (Spain) Rafael Nadal (semifinals, withdrew)
3. (Germany) Alexander Zverev (third round)
4. (Switzerland) Roger Federer (final)
5. (South Africa) ~~Kevin Anderson~~ (withdrew)
6. (Japan) Kei Nishikori (third round)
7. (Austria) Dominic Thiem (champion)
8. (United States) John Isner (fourth round)
9. (Greece) Stefanos Tsitsipas (second round)
10. (Croatia) Marin Čilić (third round)
11. (Croatia) Borna Ćorić (second round)
12. (Russia) Karen Khachanov (quarterfinals)
13. (Canada) Milos Raonic (semifinals)
14. (Russia) Daniil Medvedev (third round)
15. (Italy) Marco Cecchinato (second round)
16. (Italy) Fabio Fognini (second round)

17. (Georgia (country)) Nikoloz Basilashvili (second round)
18. (France) Gaël Monfils (quarterfinals, withdrew)
19. (Spain) ~~Pablo Carreño Busta~~ (withdrew)
20. (Belgium) David Goffin (second round)
21. (Spain) Roberto Bautista Agut (second round)
22. (United Kingdom) Kyle Edmund (fourth round)
23. (Australia) Alex de Minaur (second round)
24. (Canada) Denis Shapovalov (fourth round)
25. (Argentina) Diego Schwartzman (third round)
26. (Bulgaria) ~~Grigor Dimitrov~~ (withdrew)
27. (France) Gilles Simon (third round)
28. (France) Lucas Pouille (second round)
29. (Hungary) Márton Fucsovics (second round)
30. (Serbia) Laslo Đere (third round)
31. (Australia) Nick Kyrgios (second round)
32. (Argentina) Guido Pella (third round)

Click on the seed number of a player to go to their draw section.

== Draw ==
Key

- Q = Qualifier
- WC = Wild card
- LL = Lucky loser
- Alt = Alternate
- ITF = ITF entry
- PR = Protected ranking
- SR = Special ranking
- SE = Special exempt
- JE = Junior exempt
- JR = Junior Accelerator Programme entrant
- CO = College Accelerator Programme entrant
- NG = Next Gen Accelerator Program entrant
- w/o = Walkover
- r = Retired
- d = Defaulted

=== Finals ===
Quarterfinals
18	(France) Gaël Monfils
7	(Austria) Dominic Thiem	w/o
13	(Canada) Milos Raonic	6	6
LL	(Serbia) Miomir Kecmanović	3	4
(Poland) Hubert Hurkacz	4	4
4	(Switzerland) Roger Federer	6	6
12	(Russia) Karen Khachanov	6^{2}	6^{2}
2	(Spain) Rafael Nadal	7^{7}	7^{7}

Semifinals
7	(Austria) Dominic Thiem	7^{7}	6^{3}	6
13	(Canada) Milos Raonic	6^{3}	7^{7}	4
4	(Switzerland) Roger Federer	w/o
2	(Spain) Rafael Nadal

Final
7	(Austria) Dominic Thiem	3	6	7
4	(Switzerland) Roger Federer	6	3	5

=== Top half ===
==== Section 1 ====
First round
Q	(United States) B Fratangelo	4	6	6
Q	(Sweden) E Ymer	6	2	2
(France) P-H Herbert	4	0
(Germany) P Kohlschreiber	6	6
WC	(United States) R Opelka	6^{6}	6^{2}
(Argentina) L Mayer	7^{8}	7^{7}
(Bosnia and Herzegovina) D Džumhur	1	2
(Spain) A Ramos Viñolas	6	6

Second round
1	(Serbia) N Djokovic	7^{7}	6
Q	(United States) B Fratangelo	6^{5}	2
(Germany) P Kohlschreiber	6	6
31	(Australia) N Kyrgios	4	4
18	(France) G Monfils	6	3	6
(Argentina) L Mayer	4	6	3
(Spain) A Ramos Viñolas	6	6
15	(Italy) M Cecchinato	4	2

Third round
1	(Serbia) N Djokovic	4	4
(Germany) P Kohlschreiber	6	6
18	(France) G Monfils	6	6
(Spain) A Ramos Viñolas	0	3

Fourth round
(Germany) P Kohlschreiber	0	2
18	(France) G Monfils	6	6

==== Section 2 ====
First round
(Croatia) I Karlović	7^{7}	7^{7}
(Australia) M Ebden	6^{3}	6^{3}
Q	(India) P Gunneswaran	7^{7}	6
(France) B Paire	6^{5}	4
(United States) B Klahn	4	2
(Tunisia) M Jaziri	6	6
(Argentina) F Delbonis	4	7^{8}	6^{5}
(Australia) J Thompson	6	6^{6}	7^{7}

Second round
11	(Croatia) B Ćorić	4	6^{2}
(Croatia) I Karlović	6	7^{7}
Q	(India) P Gunneswaran	6	6^{6}	7^{7}
17	(Georgia (country)) N Basilashvili	4	7^{8}	6^{4}
27	(France) G Simon	6	6^{6}	6
(Tunisia) M Jaziri	3	7^{8}	4
(Australia) J Thompson	4	5
7	(Austria) D Thiem	6	7

Third round
(Croatia) I Karlović	6	7^{7}
Q	(India) P Gunneswaran	3	6^{3}
27	(France) G Simon	3	1
7	(Austria) D Thiem	6	6

Fourth round
(Croatia) I Karlović	4	3
7	(Austria) D Thiem	6	6

==== Section 3 ====
First round
(Slovakia) M Kližan	6	6
(Germany) M Zverev	1	4
(Australia) J Millman	1	3
(Germany) J-L Struff	6	6
Q	(United States) M Giron	7^{7}	7^{7}
(France) J Chardy	6^{3}	6^{1}
(Italy) M Berrettini	6^{5}	6	4
(United States) S Querrey	7^{7}	2	6

Second round
3	(Germany) A Zverev	6	2
(Slovakia) M Kližan	3	0^{r}
(Germany) J-L Struff	3	6	6
LL	(Lithuania) R Berankis	6	3	2
23	(Australia) A de Minaur	6	4	2
Q	(United States) M Giron	1	6	6
(United States) S Querrey	6^{1}	4
13	(Canada) M Raonic	7^{7}	6

Third round
3	(Germany) A Zverev	3	1
(Germany) J-L Struff	6	6
Q	(United States) M Giron	6	4	4
13	(Canada) M Raonic	4	6	6

Fourth round
(Germany) J-L Struff	4	3
13	(Canada) M Raonic	6	6

==== Section 4 ====
First round
WC	(Canada) F Auger-Aliassime	6	6
(United Kingdom) C Norrie	3	2
(United States) D Kudla	6	3	2
(Japan) Y Nishioka	3	6	6
(Belarus) I Ivashka	6^{3}	4
(Argentina) G Andreozzi	7^{7}	6
(Germany) M Marterer	6	6
Q	(France) U Humbert	4	2

Second round
9	(Greece) S Tsitsipas	4	2
WC	(Canada) F Auger-Aliassime	6	6
(Japan) Y Nishioka	7^{7}	6
21	(Spain) R Bautista Agut	6^{3}	4
30/WC	(Serbia) L Đere	6	6
(Argentina) G Andreozzi	3	4
(Germany) M Marterer	3	2
LL	(Serbia) M Kecmanović	6	6

Third round
WC	(Canada) F Auger-Aliassime	7^{7}	4	6^{5}
(Japan) Y Nishioka	6^{2}	6	7^{7}
30/WC	(Serbia) L Đere	2	6^{3}
LL	(Serbia) M Kecmanović	6	7^{7}

Fourth round
(Japan) Y Nishioka	4	0^{r}
LL	(Serbia) M Kecmanović	6	0

=== Bottom half ===
==== Section 5 ====
First round
(United States) T Sandgren	2	7^{7}	1
(France) A Mannarino	6	6^{5}	6
WC	(United States) D Young	3	3
(Poland) H Hurkacz	6	6
(United States) T Fritz	3	3
(United States) S Johnson	6	6
(Japan) T Daniel	6^{6}	4
(Serbia) D Lajović	7^{8}	6

Second round
6	(Japan) K Nishikori	6	4	7^{7}
(France) A Mannarino	4	6	6^{4}
(Poland) H Hurkacz	6	3	6
28	(France) L Pouille	2	6	4
24	(Canada) D Shapovalov	6	6
(United States) S Johnson	3	4
(Serbia) D Lajović	3	4
10	(Croatia) M Čilić	6	6

Third round
6	(Japan) K Nishikori	6	4	3
(Poland) H Hurkacz	4	6	6
24	(Canada) D Shapovalov	6	6
10	(Croatia) M Čilić	4	2

Fourth round
(Poland) H Hurkacz	7^{7}	2	6
24	(Canada) D Shapovalov	6^{3}	6	3

==== Section 6 ====
First round
(Romania) M Copil	2	2
Q	(Moldova) R Albot	6	6
(Chile) N Jarry	6	4	7
(United States) F Tiafoe	4	6	5
Q	(United Kingdom) D Evans	7^{7}	3	3
(Switzerland) S Wawrinka	6^{4}	6	6
(Germany) P Gojowczyk	7	6
(Italy) A Seppi	5	4

Second round
16	(Italy) F Fognini	0	6^{4}
Q	(Moldova) R Albot	6	7^{7}
(Chile) N Jarry	2	0
22	(United Kingdom) K Edmund	6	6
29	(Hungary) M Fucsovics	4	7^{7}	5
(Switzerland) S Wawrinka	6	6^{5}	7
(Germany) P Gojowczyk	1	5
4	(Switzerland) R Federer	6	7

Third round
Q	(Moldova) R Albot	3	3
22	(United Kingdom) K Edmund	6	6
(Switzerland) S Wawrinka	3	4
4	(Switzerland) R Federer	6	6

Fourth round
22	(United Kingdom) K Edmund	1	4
4	(Switzerland) R Federer	6	6

==== Section 7 ====
First round
(Spain) J Munar	6^{7}	3
Q	(Australia) A Popyrin	7^{9}	6
(Latvia) E Gulbis	3	7	2
Q	(Australia) A Bolt	6	5	6
(Netherlands) R Haase	7^{7}	6
Q	(Uzbekistan) D Istomin	6^{2}	1
(Czech Republic) T Berdych	6^{3}	6^{2}
(Spain) F López	7^{7}	7^{7}

Second round
8	(United States) J Isner	6	6
Q	(Australia) A Popyrin	0	2
Q	(Australia) A Bolt	6^{5}	6	3
32	(Argentina) G Pella	7^{7}	2	6
LL	(Russia) A Rublev	6	3	6
(Netherlands) R Haase	3	6	3
(Spain) F López	3	6	4
12	(Russia) K Khachanov	6	1	6

Third round
8	(United States) J Isner	6	6
32	(Argentina) G Pella	3	4
LL	(Russia) A Rublev	5	3
12	(Russia) K Khachanov	7	6

Fourth round
8	(United States) J Isner	4	6^{1}
12	(Russia) K Khachanov	6	7^{7}

==== Section 8 ====
First round
(United States) M McDonald	6	3	6
(Portugal) J Sousa	4	6	3
(Kazakhstan) M Kukushkin	3	4
Q	(Serbia) F Krajinović	6	6
(Spain) R Carballés Baena	6	7
(United States) R Harrison	3	5
Q	(Japan) T Ito	3	5
WC	(United States) J Donaldson	6	7

Second round
14	(Russia) D Medvedev	7	6
(United States) M McDonald	5	0
Q	(Serbia) F Krajinović	6	6
20	(Belgium) D Goffin	3	3
25	(Argentina) D Schwartzman	6	6
(Spain) R Carballés Baena	3	1
WC	(United States) J Donaldson	1	1
2	(Spain) R Nadal	6	6

Third round
14	(Russia) D Medvedev	3	2
Q	(Serbia) F Krajinović	6	6
25	(Argentina) D Schwartzman	3	1
2	(Spain) R Nadal	6	6

Fourth round
Q	(Serbia) F Krajinović	3	4
2	(Spain) R Nadal	6	6

== Qualifying ==
=== Seeds ===
1. (Moldova) Radu Albot (qualified)
2. (Argentina) Juan Ignacio Londero (first round)
3. (France) Ugo Humbert (qualified)
4. (Australia) Bernard Tomic (first round)
5. (Italy) Thomas Fabbiano (first round)
6. (South Africa) Lloyd Harris (first round)
7. (Norway) Casper Ruud (first round)
8. (Lithuania) Ričardas Berankis (qualifying competition, lucky loser)
9. (India) Prajnesh Gunneswaran (qualified)
10. (United Kingdom) Dan Evans (qualified)
11. (Uzbekistan) Denis Istomin (qualified)
12. (Russia) Andrey Rublev (qualifying competition, lucky loser)
13. (Italy) Paolo Lorenzi (first round, retired)
14. (Argentina) Marco Trungelliti (first round)
15. (Serbia) Filip Krajinović (qualified)
16. (Slovakia) Jozef Kovalík (first round)
17. (Sweden) Elias Ymer (qualified)
18. (Germany) Yannick Maden (first round)
19. (Russia) Evgeny Donskoy (first round)
20. (Switzerland) Henri Laaksonen (first round)
21. (Australia) Alex Bolt (qualified)
22. (Canada) Peter Polansky (first round)
23. (United States) Bjorn Fratangelo (qualified)
24. (Serbia) Miomir Kecmanović (qualifying competition, lucky loser)

=== Qualifiers ===
1. (Moldova) Radu Albot
2. (Sweden) Elias Ymer
3. (France) Ugo Humbert
4. (Australia) Alexei Popyrin
5. (United States) Marcos Giron
6. (Australia) Alex Bolt
7. (Japan) Tatsuma Ito
8. (Serbia) Filip Krajinović
9. (India) Prajnesh Gunneswaran
10. (United Kingdom) Dan Evans
11. (Uzbekistan) Denis Istomin
12. (United States) Bjorn Fratangelo

=== Lucky losers ===
1. (Lithuania) Ričardas Berankis
2. (Russia) Andrey Rublev
3. (Serbia) Miomir Kecmanović

=== Qualifying draw ===
==== First qualifier ====
First round
1	(Moldova) Radu Albot	6	6
(United States) Mitchell Krueger	1	4
(Slovakia) Lukáš Lacko	6	6^{5}	7^{7}
22	(Canada) Peter Polansky	4	7^{7}	6^{3}

Qualifying competition
1	(Moldova) Radu Albot	7^{7}	7^{7}
(Slovakia) Lukáš Lacko	6^{4}	6^{2}

==== Second qualifier ====
First round
2	(Argentina) Juan Ignacio Londero	3	6^{7}
WC	(United States) Christian Harrison	6	7^{9}
(Barbados) Darian King	6	1	2
17	(Sweden) Elias Ymer	1	6	6

Qualifying competition
WC	(United States) Christian Harrison	7^{7}	4	2
17	(Sweden) Elias Ymer	6^{3}	6	6

==== Third qualifier ====
First round
3	(France) Ugo Humbert	6	6
(Estonia) Jürgen Zopp	3	1
WC	(United States) J. J. Wolf	6	6
14	(Argentina) Marco Trungelliti	4	1

Qualifying competition
3	(France) Ugo Humbert	7	7
WC	(United States) J. J. Wolf	5	5

==== Fourth qualifier ====
First round
4	(Australia) Bernard Tomic	6^{5}	6	3
(Czech Republic) Lukáš Rosol	7^{7}	2	6
(Australia) Alexei Popyrin	6	6
16	(Slovakia) Jozef Kovalík	3	3

Qualifying competition
(Czech Republic) Lukáš Rosol	5	3
(Australia) Alexei Popyrin	7	6

==== Fifth qualifier ====
First round
5	(Italy) Thomas Fabbiano	3	6	4
WC	(United States) Marcos Giron	6	2	6
(Italy) Luca Vanni	3	2
24	(Serbia) Miomir Kecmanović	6	6

Qualifying competition
WC	(United States) Marcos Giron	6^{3}	7	7^{7}
24	(Serbia) Miomir Kecmanović	7^{7}	5	6^{4}

==== Sixth qualifier ====
First round
6	(South Africa) Lloyd Harris	5	5
(United States) Christopher Eubanks	7	7
(Italy) Gianluigi Quinzi	4	5
21	(Australia) Alex Bolt	6	7

Qualifying competition
(United States) Christopher Eubanks	6^{3}	6^{4}
21	(Australia) Alex Bolt	7^{7}	7^{7}

==== Seventh qualifier ====
First round
7	(Norway) Casper Ruud	7^{7}	1	4
(Japan) Tatsuma Ito	6^{3}	6	6
WC	(United States) JC Aragone	6	6
20	(Switzerland) Henri Laaksonen	2	2

Qualifying competition
(Japan) Tatsuma Ito	7^{8}	6
WC	(United States) JC Aragone	6^{6}	3

==== Eighth qualifier ====
First round
8	(Lithuania) Ričardas Berankis	6	6^{4}	6
(Japan) Yasutaka Uchiyama	4	7^{7}	2
(India) Ramkumar Ramanathan	4	0
15	(Serbia) Filip Krajinović	6	6

Qualifying competition
8	(Lithuania) Ričardas Berankis	3	5
15	(Serbia) Filip Krajinović	6	7

==== Ninth qualifier ====
First round
9	(India) Prajnesh Gunneswaran	7	6
(Chinese Taipei) Jason Jung	5	4
(Italy) Salvatore Caruso	5
13	(Italy) Paolo Lorenzi	4^{r}

Qualifying competition
9	(India) Prajnesh Gunneswaran	6	3	6
(Italy) Salvatore Caruso	2	6	2

==== Tenth qualifier ====
First round
10	(United Kingdom) Dan Evans	6	6
(Belgium) Ruben Bemelmans	4	4
(United States) Noah Rubin	6	3	6
18	(Germany) Yannick Maden	4	6	1

Qualifying competition
10	(United Kingdom) Dan Evans	6	6
(United States) Noah Rubin	1	1

==== Eleventh qualifier ====
First round
11	(Uzbekistan) Denis Istomin	6	6
WC	(United States) Evan Song	3	4
(Belarus) Egor Gerasimov	6	6
19	(Russia) Evgeny Donskoy	3	3

Qualifying competition
11	(Uzbekistan) Denis Istomin	6	6
(Belarus) Egor Gerasimov	4	4

==== Twelfth qualifier ====
First round
12	(Russia) Andrey Rublev	2	6	6
(Poland) Kamil Majchrzak	6	4	4
(Spain) Adrián Menéndez Maceiras	4	2
23	(United States) Bjorn Fratangelo	6	6

Qualifying competition
12	(Russia) Andrey Rublev	7^{7}	6^{6}	0
23	(United States) Bjorn Fratangelo	6^{1}	7^{8}	6
