= Indian Wells Tennis Garden =

Tennis facility near Palm Springs, California

Coordinates: 33°43′26.72″N 116°18′20.17″W

- Evening view of the grounds during the 2023 BNP Paribas Open.
- Interactive map of Indian Wells Tennis Garden
- Location: Indian Wells, California, United States
- Owner: Larry Ellison
- Operator: Charlie Pasarell and Raymond Moore (PM Sports Management)
- Capacity: Stadium 1: 16,100; Stadium 2: 8,000
- Surface: Hard (Laykold), Outdoors

Construction
- Opened: March 2000
- Reopened: March 3, 2014 (expansion)
- Cost: $77 million ($11 million 2014 expansion)
- Architect: Rossetti Architects

The Indian Wells Tennis Garden is a tennis facility in Indian Wells, near Palm Springs, California, in the Coachella Valley. The 16,100-capacity Stadium 1 is the largest stadium at the tennis complex, and the second largest outdoor tennis stadium in the world (after Arthur Ashe Stadium at the US Open).

It is the home of the BNP Paribas Open (previously the Pacific Life Open), a joint event of both the men's ATP World Tour and the women's WTA Tour, and constitutes the fifth largest tournament in the world, held each year in March. The Indian Wells Tennis Garden also hosts junior and adult United States Tennis Association events year-round and previously hosted ATP Challenger and WTA 125 events as part of the Oracle Challenger Series – Indian Wells. The stadium hosted the 2026 WTA Finals. In addition to these large events, during the week members can use the courts for recreational play, and the Tennis Garden sets up matches for individuals who want to play. Additionally, the venue offers clinics, and there are professionals on staff available for a fee.

== History ==
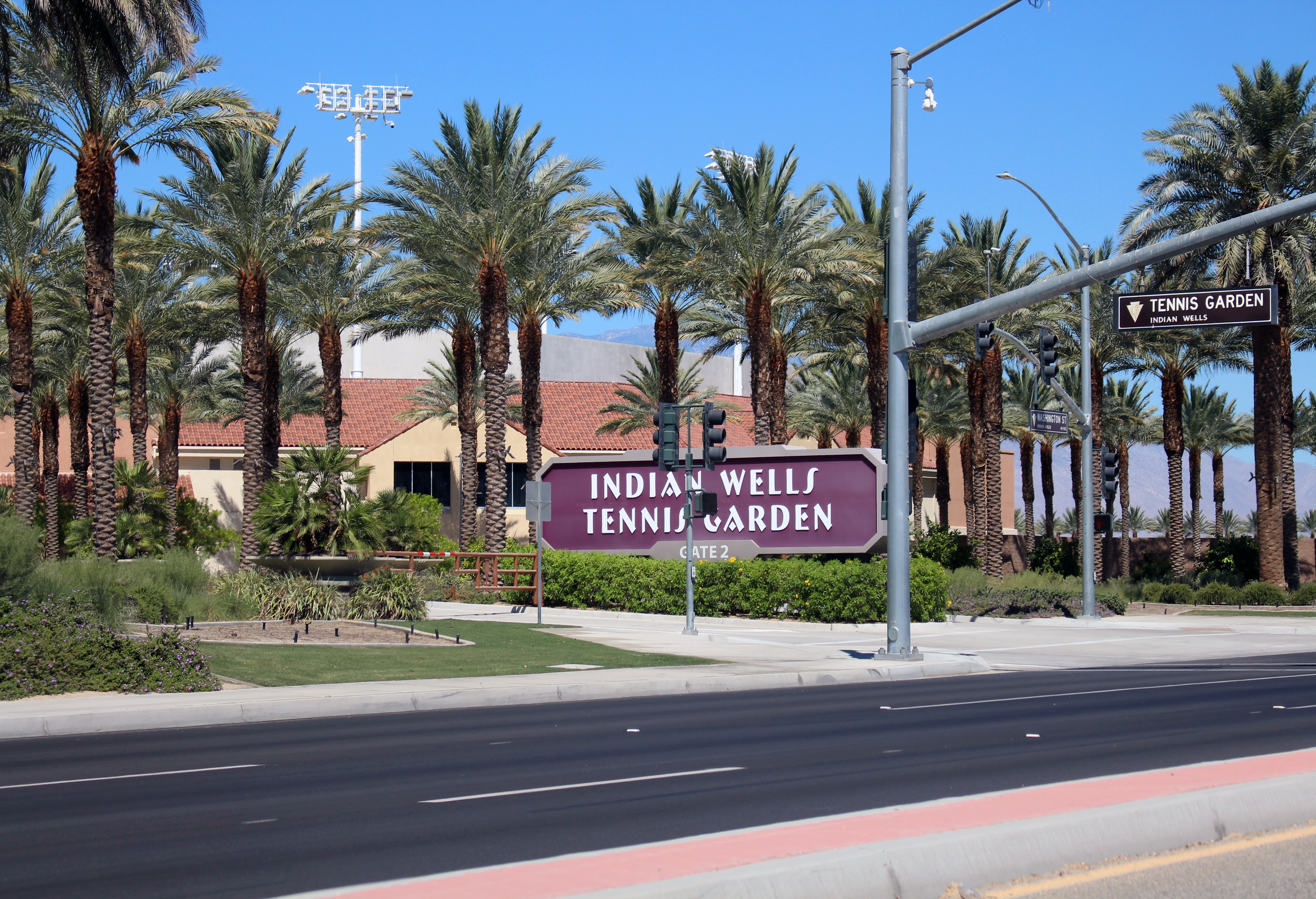
The Tennis Garden and roadside signage as seen by passerby.

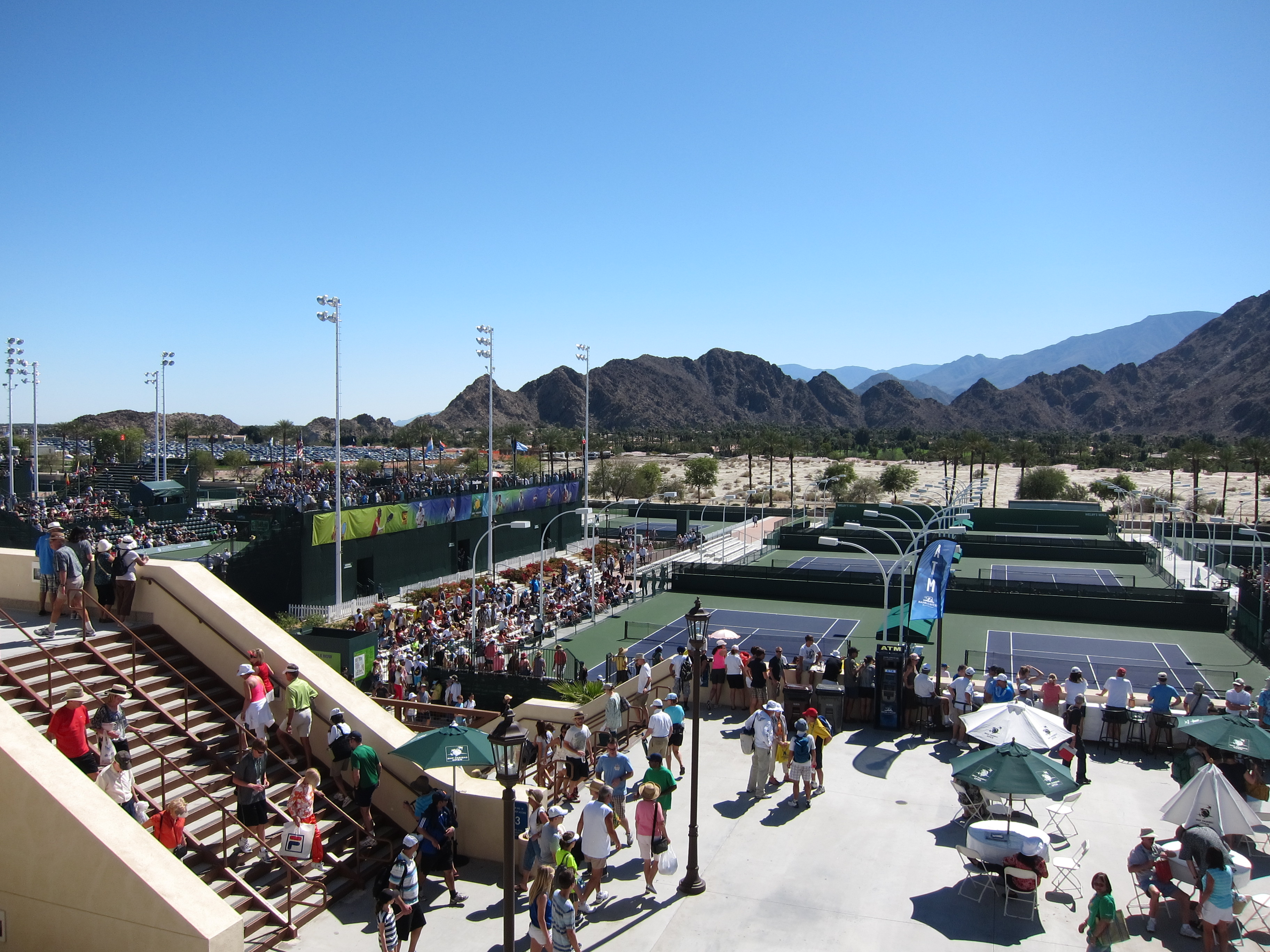
Evening view of the grounds during the 2013 BNP Paribas Open.

The $77 million facility was built in March 2000, and was designed by Rossetti Associates Architects. It was a result of former no. 1 US player, tournament chairman and owner of the BNP Paribas Open, Charlie Pasarell, partnering with Raymond Moore, to privately raise the money to fund the $77 million development. It was financed by IMG, led by Bob Kain. When Pasarell and his partners first purchased 88 acres of sand in the middle of the Coachella Valley, many doubted its ability to attract people, as all other major tournaments are located in large metropolitan areas, such as Paris, London, New York City, and Melbourne. However, subsequent owners have shared and built on Pasarell's vision for the center.

In 2006, the Indian Wells Tennis Garden was bought by a group of private investors including Tennis Magazine owners George Mackin and Bob Miller, Pete Sampras, Chris Evert, Billie Jean King, Greg Norman, Charlie Pasarell, and Raymond Moore. In December 2009, Larry Ellison, co-founder and CEO of Oracle Corporation, became the owner of both the Indian Wells Tennis Garden and the BNP Paribas Open. A long-term tennis enthusiast, Ellison continually invests in upgrading the facility, including a new, permanent Stadium 2 with 8,000 seats, two 19,000-square-foot shade structures, 29 world-class courts, 23 lighted courts, upgraded locker rooms and fitness areas, a 108-seat press room and 18 broadcast booths, eight acres of outdoor exposition space and 54 acres of outdoor parking.

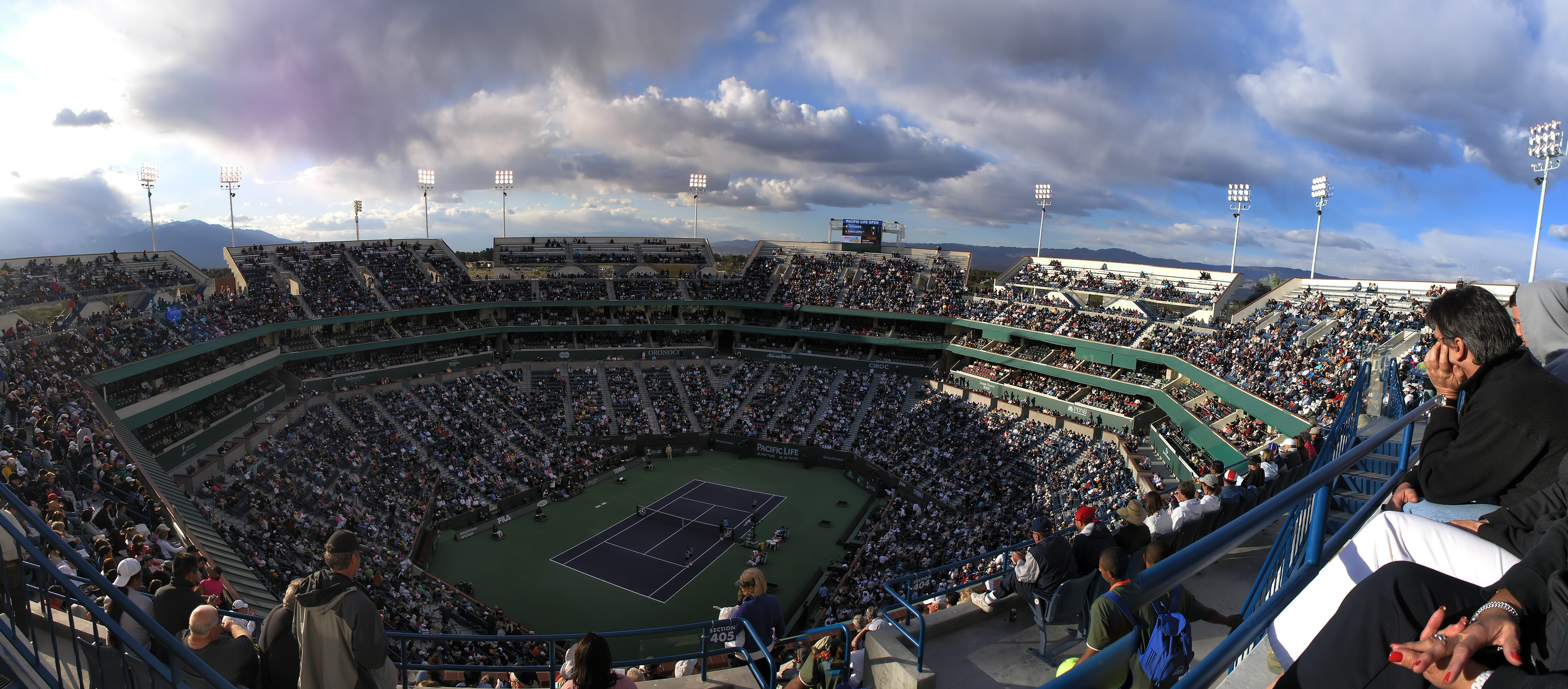
Stadium 1 during Roger Federer's evening match in 2008

In total, the Tennis Garden contains 29 tennis courts, including a 16,100-seat Stadium 1, 9 match courts and 6 practice courts. Stadium 1 is the second largest tennis-specific stadium in the world.

As well as tennis, the venue has hosted concerts by artists such as The Eagles, The Who, Tom Petty, Andrea Bocelli, and RBD. The NBA has played three pre-season exhibition games at Indian Wells, with all these events involving the Phoenix Suns. The first game featured the Suns against the Denver Nuggets on October 11, 2008; the NBA's first outdoor game since September 1972. On October 10, 2009, the Suns played the Golden State Warriors and on October 9, 2010, the game featured the Suns and the Dallas Mavericks.

== Indian Wells Masters ==
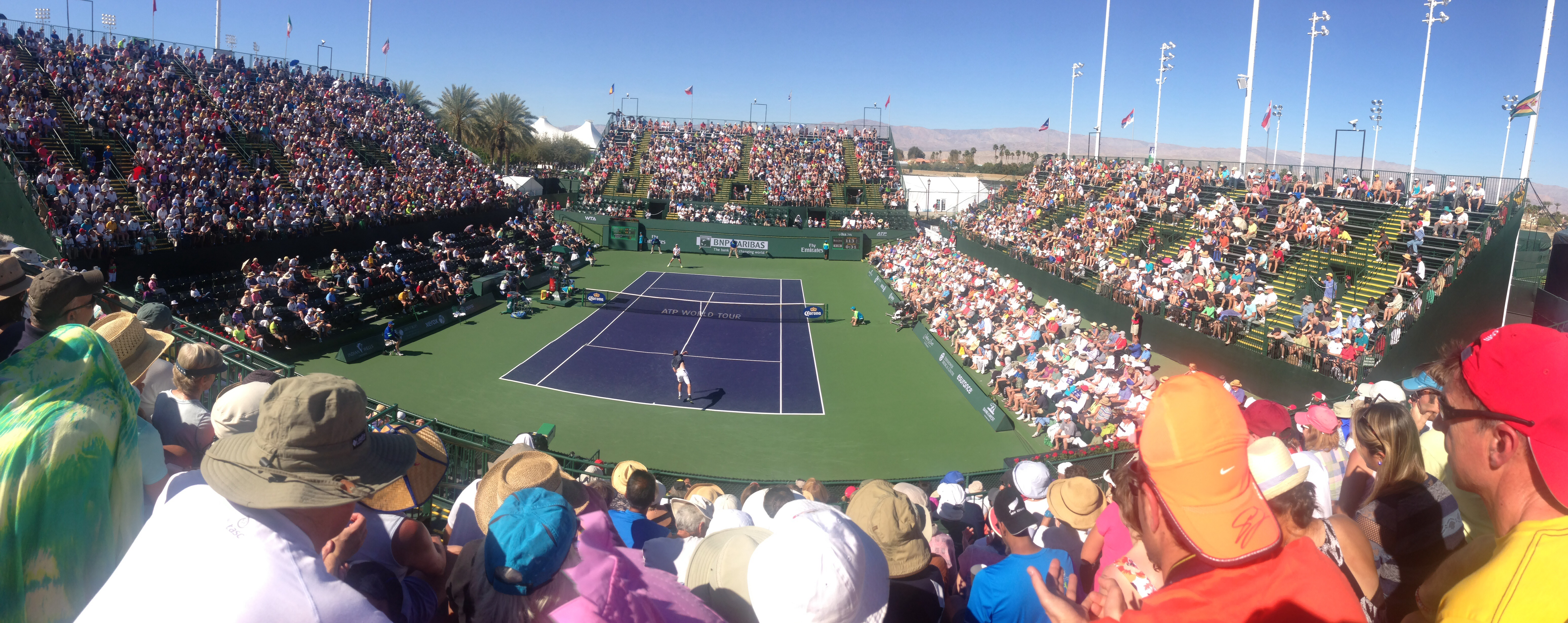
Afternoon view of Stadium 3 during the 2013 BNP Paribas Open.

The Indian Wells Masters, also known by its currently sponsored name BNP Paribas Open, has been held at the Indian Wells Tennis Garden since 2009. Previously, it was home to the Pacific Life Open and the Indian Wells Masters tennis events. The tournament is held annually at the Indian Wells Tennis Garden in the second week of March. The tournament is an ATP Tour Masters 1000 on the ATP Tour and a WTA 1000 on the WTA Tour. The tournament also helps local charities with donations, and the tennis stars themselves sometimes help out.

== Expansion ==
After the conclusion of the 2013 BNP Paribas Open, the Tennis Garden underwent an expansion, including a new permanent Stadium 2 with a capacity of 8,000 and containing three new restaurants overlooking the court, a new Tennis Garden Village (18,000 sq ft), and additional seating to the outer and practice courts. A grand entrance to the tennis grounds on Washington Street, with a new box office and an additional 2,000 paved parking spots. Numerous video walls were added throughout the Tennis Garden with new information towers. The expansion was complete by the start of the 2014 BNP Paribas Open. The revamping of the tennis center also included a "Pro Purple" interior court color created specifically for the ATP Masters Series and first used at Indian Wells, citing the purple color being 180 degrees opposite the yellow of the ball on the color wheel.

== See also ==
- List of tennis stadiums by capacity

Preceded by Hyatt Regency Indian Wells Resort and Spa	Indian Wells Open; Venue; 2000–present	Succeeded by Incumbent
Preceded by King Saud University Indoor Arena; Riyadh	WTA Finals; Venue; 2026	Succeeded by To be announced
