= 2021 WTA 1000 tournaments =

Women's professional tennis tour

2021 WTA 1000
Details
- Duration: March 8 – October 17
- Edition: 32nd
- Tournaments: 7

Achievements (singles)
- Most titles: (Australia) Ashleigh Barty (2)
- Most finals: (Australia) Ashleigh Barty (3)

The WTA 1000 Mandatory and non-Mandatory tournaments, which are part of the WTA 1000 tournaments, make up the elite tour for professional women's tennis organised by the WTA called the WTA Tour. There are four 1000 Mandatory tournaments: Indian Wells, Miami, Madrid and Beijing and five non-Mandatory tournaments: Dubai, Rome, Canada, Cincinnati and Wuhan.

== Tournaments ==
Tournament	Country	Location	Surface	Date	Prize money
Dubai Tennis Championships	United Arab Emirates	Dubai	Hard	Mar 8 – 14	$1,835,490
Indian Wells Open	United States	Indian Wells	Hard	Oct 4 – 17 (rescheduled)	$8,761,725
Miami Open	United States	Miami Gardens	Hard	Mar 22 – Apr 4	$3,260,190
Madrid Open	Spain	Madrid	Clay (red)	April 29 – May 8	€2,549,105
Italian Open	Italy	Rome	Clay (red)	May 10 – 16	€1,577,613
Canadian Open	Canada	Montreal	Hard	Aug 9 – 15	$1,835,490
Cincinnati Open	United States	Mason	Hard	Aug 16 – 22	$2,114,989
Wuhan Open	China	Wuhan	Hard	Sep 27 – Oct 3 (cancelled)	—
China Open	China	Beijing	Hard	Oct 4 – 10 (cancelled)	—

== Results ==
* First-time champion

Tournament	Singles champions	Runners-up	Score	Doubles champions	Runners-up	Score
Dubai Singles – Doubles	(Spain) Garbiñe Muguruza	(Czech Republic) Barbora Krejčíková	7–6^{(8–6)}, 6–3	(Chile) Alexa Guarachi* (Croatia) Darija Jurak*	(China) Xu Yifan (China) Yang Zhaoxuan	6–0, 6–3
Miami Singles – Doubles	(Australia) Ashleigh Barty	(Canada) Bianca Andreescu	6–3, 4–0, ret.	(Japan) Shuko Aoyama* (Japan) Ena Shibahara*	(United States) Hayley Carter (Brazil) Luisa Stefani	6–2, 7–5
Madrid Singles – Doubles	(Belarus) Aryna Sabalenka	(Australia) Ashleigh Barty	6–0, 3–6, 6–4	(Czech Republic) Barbora Krejčíková (Czech Republic) Kateřina Siniaková	(Canada) Gabriela Dabrowski (Netherlands) Demi Schuurs	6–4, 6–3
Rome Singles – Doubles	(Poland) Iga Świątek*	(Czech Republic) Karolína Plíšková	6–0, 6–0	(Canada) Sharon Fichman* (Mexico) Giuliana Olmos*	(France) Kristina Mladenovic (Czech Republic) Markéta Vondroušová	4–6, 7–5, [10–5]
Montréal Singles – Doubles	(Italy) Camila Giorgi*	(Czech Republic) Karolína Plíšková	6–3, 7–5	(Canada) Gabriela Dabrowski	(Croatia) Darija Jurak (Slovenia) Andreja Klepač	6–3, 6–4
Montréal Singles – Doubles	(Italy) Camila Giorgi*	(Czech Republic) Karolína Plíšková	6–3, 7–5	(Brazil) Luisa Stefani*	(Croatia) Darija Jurak (Slovenia) Andreja Klepač	6–3, 6–4
Cincinnati Singles – Doubles	(Australia) Ashleigh Barty (2)	(Switzerland) Jil Teichmann	6–3, 6–1	(Australia) Samantha Stosur	(Canada) Gabriela Dabrowski (Brazil) Luisa Stefani	7–5, 6–3
Cincinnati Singles – Doubles	(Australia) Ashleigh Barty (2)	(Switzerland) Jil Teichmann	6–3, 6–1	(China) Zhang Shuai*	(Canada) Gabriela Dabrowski (Brazil) Luisa Stefani	7–5, 6–3
Indian Wells Singles – Doubles	(Spain) Paula Badosa*	(Belarus) Victoria Azarenka	7–6^{(7–5)}, 2–6, 7–6^{(7–2)}	(Chinese Taipei) Hsieh Su-wei (Belgium) Elise Mertens	(Russia) Veronika Kudermetova (Kazakhstan) Elena Rybakina	7–6^{(7–1)}, 6–3
Wuhan	Cancelled due to the COVID-19 pandemic.					
Beijing	Cancelled due to the COVID-19 pandemic.					

== Tournaments details ==
Key

- Q = Qualifier
- WC = Wild card
- LL = Lucky loser
- Alt = Alternate
- ITF = ITF entry
- PR = Protected ranking
- SR = Special ranking
- SE = Special exempt
- JE = Junior exempt
- JR = Junior Accelerator Programme entrant
- CO = College Accelerator Programme entrant
- NG = Next Gen Accelerator Program entrant
- w/o = Walkover
- r = Retired
- d = Defaulted

=== Dubai ===
==== Singles ====
Quarterfinals
(Czech Republic) Barbora Krejčíková	6	6
WC	(Russia) Anastasia Potapova	0	2
(Switzerland) Jil Teichmann	6	6
WC	(United States) Coco Gauff	3	3
9	(Spain) Garbiñe Muguruza	3	6	6
3	(Belarus) Aryna Sabalenka	6	3	2
10	(Belgium) Elise Mertens	5	7	6
(United States) Jessica Pegula	7	5	0

Semifinals
(Czech Republic) Barbora Krejčíková	7	6
(Switzerland) Jil Teichmann	5	2
9	(Spain) Garbiñe Muguruza	6	7^{7}
10	(Belgium) Elise Mertens	4	6^{5}

Final
(Czech Republic) Barbora Krejčíková	6^{6}	3
9	(Spain) Garbiñe Muguruza	7^{8}	6

==== Doubles ====
Semifinals
(United States) Bethanie Mattek-Sands (United States) Jessica Pegula	4	3
8	(Chile) Alexa Guarachi (Croatia) Darija Jurak Schreiber	6	6
(China) Xu Yifan (China) Yang Zhaoxuan	6	7
5	(Hungary) Tímea Babos (Russia) Veronika Kudermetova	3	5

Final
8	(Chile) Alexa Guarachi (Croatia) Darija Jurak Schreiber	6	6
(China) Xu Yifan (China) Yang Zhaoxuan	0	3

=== Miami ===
==== Singles ====
Quarterfinals
1	(Australia) Ashleigh Barty	6	6^{5}	6
7	(Belarus) Aryna Sabalenka	4	7^{7}	3
(Latvia) Anastasija Sevastova	3	2
5	(Ukraine) Elina Svitolina	6	6
8	(Canada) Bianca Andreescu	6	3	6
(Spain) Sara Sorribes Tormo	4	6	3
23	(Greece) Maria Sakkari	6	6
2	(Japan) Naomi Osaka	0	4

Semifinals
1	(Australia) Ashleigh Barty	6	6
5	(Ukraine) Elina Svitolina	3	3
8	(Canada) Bianca Andreescu	7^{9}	3	7^{7}
23	(Greece) Maria Sakkari	6^{7}	6	6^{4}

Final
1	(Australia) Ashleigh Barty	6	4
8	(Canada) Bianca Andreescu	3	0^{r}

==== Doubles ====
Semifinals
(United States) Bethanie Mattek-Sands (Poland) Iga Świątek	6	6^{4}	[2]
5	(Japan) Shuko Aoyama (Japan) Ena Shibahara	3	7^{7}	[10]
8	(United States) Hayley Carter (Brazil) Luisa Stefani	2	6	[10]
(Canada) Gabriela Dabrowski (Mexico) Giuliana Olmos	6	3	[8]

Final
5	(Japan) Shuko Aoyama (Japan) Ena Shibahara	6	7
8	(United States) Hayley Carter (Brazil) Luisa Stefani	2	5

=== Madrid ===
==== Singles ====
Quarterfinals
1	(Australia) Ashleigh Barty	6	3	6
9	(Czech Republic) Petra Kvitová	1	6	3
WC	(Spain) Paula Badosa	6	7
8	(Switzerland) Belinda Bencic	4	5
5	(Belarus) Aryna Sabalenka	6	4
13	(Belgium) Elise Mertens	1	0^{r}
(Russia) Anastasia Pavlyuchenkova	7^{7}	7^{7}
(Czech Republic) Karolína Muchová	6^{4}	6^{2}

Semifinals
1	(Australia) Ashleigh Barty	6	6
WC	(Spain) Paula Badosa	4	3
5	(Belarus) Aryna Sabalenka	6	6
(Russia) Anastasia Pavlyuchenkova	2	3

Final
1	(Australia) Ashleigh Barty	0	6	4
5	(Belarus) Aryna Sabalenka	6	3	6

==== Doubles ====
Semifinals
(Latvia) Jeļena Ostapenko (Russia) Anastasia Pavlyuchenkova	7	4	[6]
3	(Canada) Gabriela Dabrowski (Netherlands) Demi Schuurs	5	6	[10]
(Switzerland) Belinda Bencic (Switzerland) Jil Teichmann	2	4
2	(Czech Republic) Barbora Krejčíková (Czech Republic) Kateřina Siniaková	6	6

Final
3	(Canada) Gabriela Dabrowski (Netherlands) Demi Schuurs	4	3
2	(Czech Republic) Barbora Krejčíková (Czech Republic) Kateřina Siniaková	6	6

=== Rome ===
==== Singles ====
Quarterfinals
1	(Australia) Ashleigh Barty	6	2^{r}
(United States) Coco Gauff	4	1
15	(Poland) Iga Świątek	6	7
5	(Ukraine) Elina Svitolina	2	5
9	(Czech Republic) Karolína Plíšková	4	7	7^{7}
(Latvia) Jeļena Ostapenko	6	5	6^{1}
(Croatia) Petra Martić	7	6
(United States) Jessica Pegula	5	4

Semifinals
(United States) Coco Gauff	6^{3}	3
15	(Poland) Iga Świątek	7^{7}	6
9	(Czech Republic) Karolína Plíšková	6	3	6
(Croatia) Petra Martić	1	6	2

Final
15	(Poland) Iga Świątek	6	6
9	(Czech Republic) Karolína Plíšková	0	0

==== Doubles ====
Semifinals
Alt	(Canada) Sharon Fichman (Mexico) Giuliana Olmos	6	6
4	(Japan) Shuko Aoyama (Japan) Ena Shibahara	3	2
WC	(Romania) Irina-Camelia Begu (Italy) Sara Errani	2	3
(France) Kristina Mladenovic (Czech Republic) Markéta Vondroušová	6	6

Final
Alt	(Canada) Sharon Fichman (Mexico) Giuliana Olmos	4	7	[10]
(France) Kristina Mladenovic (Czech Republic) Markéta Vondroušová	6	5	[5]

=== Montreal ===
==== Singles ====
Quarterfinals
1	(Belarus) Aryna Sabalenka	6	6
8	(Belarus) Victoria Azarenka	2	4
4	(Czech Republic) Karolína Plíšková	6	6
(Spain) Sara Sorribes Tormo	4	0
(Italy) Camila Giorgi	6	7^{7}
15	(United States) Coco Gauff	4	6^{2}
(United States) Jessica Pegula	1	7^{7}	6
13	(Tunisia) Ons Jabeur	6	6^{4}	0

Semifinals
1	(Belarus) Aryna Sabalenka	3	4
4	(Czech Republic) Karolína Plíšková	6	6
(Italy) Camila Giorgi	6	3	6
(United States) Jessica Pegula	3	6	1

Final
4	(Czech Republic) Karolína Plíšková	3	5
(Italy) Camila Giorgi	6	7

==== Doubles ====
Semifinals
5	(Canada) Gabriela Dabrowski (Brazil) Luisa Stefani	6	6
(Russia) Veronika Kudermetova (Kazakhstan) Elena Rybakina	2	3
6	(Croatia) Darija Jurak (Slovenia) Andreja Klepač	7	6
(Poland) Magda Linette (United States) Bernarda Pera	5	4

Final
5	(Canada) Gabriela Dabrowski (Brazil) Luisa Stefani	6	6
6	(Croatia) Darija Jurak (Slovenia) Andreja Klepač	3	4

=== Cincinnati ===
==== Singles ====
Quarterfinals
1	(Australia) Ashleigh Barty	6	6
9	(Czech Republic) Barbora Krejčíková	2	4
(Germany) Angelique Kerber	6	3
11	(Czech Republic) Petra Kvitová	4	3^{r}
5	(Czech Republic) Karolína Plíšková	7	2
(Spain) Paula Badosa	5	0^{r}
10	(Switzerland) Belinda Bencic	3	2
WC	(Switzerland) Jil Teichmann	6	6

Semifinals
1	(Australia) Ashleigh Barty	6	7
(Germany) Angelique Kerber	2	5
5	(Czech Republic) Karolína Plíšková	2	4
WC	(Switzerland) Jil Teichmann	6	6

Final
1	(Australia) Ashleigh Barty	6	6
WC	(Switzerland) Jil Teichmann	3	1

==== Doubles ====
Semifinals
(Russia) Anna Blinkova (Belarus) Aliaksandra Sasnovich	6	5	[5]
(Australia) Samantha Stosur (China) Zhang Shuai	4	7	[10]
6	(Canada) Gabriela Dabrowski (Brazil) Luisa Stefani	7	3	[10]
2	(Czech Republic) Barbora Krejčíková (Czech Republic) Kateřina Siniaková	5	6	[7]

Final
(Australia) Samantha Stosur (China) Zhang Shuai	7	6
6	(Canada) Gabriela Dabrowski (Brazil) Luisa Stefani	5	3

=== Indian Wells ===
==== Singles ====
Quarterfinals
18	(Estonia) Anett Kontaveit	5	3
12	(Tunisia) Ons Jabeur	7	6
21	(Spain) Paula Badosa	6	7
10	(Germany) Angelique Kerber	4	5
27	(Belarus) Victoria Azarenka	6	6
19	(United States) Jessica Pegula	4	2
(United States) Shelby Rogers	4	6	3
24	(Latvia) Jeļena Ostapenko	6	4	6

Semifinals
12	(Tunisia) Ons Jabeur	3	3
21	(Spain) Paula Badosa	6	6
27	(Belarus) Victoria Azarenka	3	6	7
24	(Latvia) Jeļena Ostapenko	6	3	5

Final
21	(Spain) Paula Badosa	7^{7}	2	7^{7}
27	(Belarus) Victoria Azarenka	6^{5}	6	6^{2}

==== Doubles ====
Semifinals
(Ukraine) Lyudmyla Kichenok (Latvia) Jeļena Ostapenko	4	3
(Russia) Veronika Kudermetova (Kazakhstan) Elena Rybakina	6	6
3	(Japan) Shuko Aoyama (Japan) Ena Shibahara	2	0
2	(Chinese Taipei) Hsieh Su-wei (Belgium) Elise Mertens	6	6

Final
(Russia) Veronika Kudermetova (Kazakhstan) Elena Rybakina	6^{1}	3
2	(Chinese Taipei) Hsieh Su-wei (Belgium) Elise Mertens	7^{7}	6

== See also ==
- WTA 1000 tournaments
- 2021 WTA Tour
- 2021 ATP Tour Masters 1000
- 2021 ATP Tour
