= 2021 ATP Masters 1000 tournaments =

Men's professional tennis tour

2021 ATP Masters 1000
Details
- Duration: March 22 – November 7
- Edition: 32nd
- Tournaments: 8

Achievements (singles)
- Most titles: (Germany) Alexander Zverev (2)
- Most finals: (Germany) Alexander Zverev (Russia) Andrey Rublev (Serbia) Novak Djokovic (2)

The thirty-second edition of the ATP Masters Series. The champion of each ATP Masters 1000 event is awarded 1,000 rankings points.

== Tournaments ==
Tournament	Country	Location	Surface	Date	Prize money
Indian Wells Open	USA	Indian Wells, California	Hard	Oct 4 – 17 (rescheduled)	$9,146,125
Miami Open	USA	Miami Gardens, Florida	Hard	Mar 22 – Apr 4	$4,299,205
Monte-Carlo Masters	France	Roquebrune-Cap-Martin	Clay	Apr 11 – 18	€2,460,585
Madrid Open	Spain	Madrid	Clay	Apr 30 – May 9	€3,226,325
Italian Open	Italy	Rome	Clay	May 8 – 16	€2,563,710
Canadian Open	Canada	Toronto	Hard	Aug 6 – 15	$3,487,915
Cincinnati Open	USA	Mason, Ohio	Hard	Aug 14 – 22	$6,615,690
Shanghai Masters	China	Shanghai	Hard	Oct 11 – 17 (cancelled)	—
Paris Masters	France	Paris	Hard (indoor)	Nov 1 – 7	€3,151,145

== Results ==
* First-time champion

Masters	Singles champions	Runners-up	Score	Doubles champions	Runners-up	Score
Miami Open Singles – Doubles	(Poland) Hubert Hurkacz*	(Italy) Jannik Sinner	7–6^{(7–4)}, 6–4	(Croatia) Nikola Mektić (Croatia) Mate Pavić	(United Kingdom) Dan Evans (United Kingdom) Neal Skupski	6–4, 6–4
Monte-Carlo Masters Singles – Doubles	(Greece) Stefanos Tsitsipas*	(Russia) Andrey Rublev	6–3, 6–3	(Croatia) Nikola Mektić (Croatia) Mate Pavić	(United Kingdom) Dan Evans (United Kingdom) Neal Skupski	6–3, 4–6, [10–7]
Madrid Open Singles – Doubles	(Germany) Alexander Zverev	(Italy) Matteo Berrettini	6–7^{(8–10)}, 6–4, 6–3	(Spain) Marcel Granollers (Argentina) Horacio Zeballos	(Croatia) Nikola Mektić (Croatia) Mate Pavić	1–6, 6–3, [10–8]
Italian Open Singles – Doubles	(Spain) Rafael Nadal	(Serbia) Novak Djokovic	7–5, 1–6, 6–3	(Croatia) Nikola Mektić (Croatia) Mate Pavić	(United States) Rajeev Ram (United Kingdom) Joe Salisbury	6–4, 7–6^{(7–4)}
Canadian Open Singles – Doubles	(Russia) Daniil Medvedev	(United States) Reilly Opelka	6–4, 6–3	(United States) Rajeev Ram	(Croatia) Nikola Mektić (Croatia) Mate Pavić	6–3, 4–6, [10–3]
Canadian Open Singles – Doubles	(Russia) Daniil Medvedev	(United States) Reilly Opelka	6–4, 6–3	(United Kingdom) Joe Salisbury*	(Croatia) Nikola Mektić (Croatia) Mate Pavić	6–3, 4–6, [10–3]
Cincinnati Open Singles – Doubles	(Germany) Alexander Zverev	(Russia) Andrey Rublev	6–2, 6–3	(Spain) Marcel Granollers (Argentina) Horacio Zeballos	(United States) Steve Johnson (United States) Austin Krajicek	7–6^{(7–5)}, 7–6^{(7–5)}
Shanghai Masters	Not held due to the COVID-19 pandemic.					
Indian Wells Open Singles – Doubles	(United Kingdom) Cameron Norrie*	(Georgia (country)) Nikoloz Basilashvili	3–6, 6–4, 6–1	(Australia) John Peers (Slovakia) Filip Polášek	(Russia) Aslan Karatsev (Russia) Andrey Rublev	6–3, 7–6^{(7–5)}
Paris Masters Singles – Doubles	(Serbia) Novak Djokovic	(Russia) Daniil Medvedev	4–6, 6–3, 6–3	(Germany) Tim Pütz* (New Zealand) Michael Venus*	(France) Pierre-Hugues Herbert (France) Nicolas Mahut	6–3, 6–7^{(4–7)}, [11–9]

== Tournament details ==
Key

- Q = Qualifier
- WC = Wild card
- LL = Lucky loser
- Alt = Alternate
- ITF = ITF entry
- PR = Protected ranking
- SR = Special ranking
- SE = Special exempt
- JE = Junior exempt
- JR = Junior Accelerator Programme entrant
- CO = College Accelerator Programme entrant
- NG = Next Gen Accelerator Program entrant
- w/o = Walkover
- r = Retired
- d = Defaulted

=== Miami Open ===
==== Singles ====
Quarterfinals
1	(Russia) Daniil Medvedev	4	2
7	(Spain) Roberto Bautista Agut	6	6
21	(Italy) Jannik Sinner	7^{7}	6
32	(Kazakhstan) Alexander Bublik	6^{5}	4
(United States) Sebastian Korda	5	6^{7}
4	(Russia) Andrey Rublev	7	7^{9}
26	(Poland) Hubert Hurkacz	2	6	6
2	(Greece) Stefanos Tsitsipas	6	3	4

Semifinals
7	(Spain) Roberto Bautista Agut	7	4	4
21	(Italy) Jannik Sinner	5	6	6
4	(Russia) Andrey Rublev	3	4
26	(Poland) Hubert Hurkacz	6	6

Final
21	(Italy) Jannik Sinner	6^{4}	4
26	(Poland) Hubert Hurkacz	7^{7}	6

==== Doubles ====
Semifinals
(United Kingdom) Dan Evans (United Kingdom) Neal Skupski	7^{7}	1	[10]
4	(Croatia) Ivan Dodig (Slovakia) Filip Polášek	6^{4}	6	[8]
7	(United States) Rajeev Ram (United Kingdom) Joe Salisbury	3	6^{5}
2	(Croatia) Nikola Mektić (Croatia) Mate Pavić	6	7^{7}

Final
(United Kingdom) Dan Evans (United Kingdom) Neal Skupski	4	4
2	(Croatia) Nikola Mektić (Croatia) Mate Pavić	6	6

=== Monte-Carlo Masters ===
==== Singles ====
Quarterfinals
(United Kingdom) Dan Evans	5	6	6
11	(Belgium) David Goffin	7	3	4
4	(Greece) Stefanos Tsitsipas	7	0
(Spain) Alejandro Davidovich Fokina	5	0^{r}
6	(Russia) Andrey Rublev	6	4	6
3	(Spain) Rafael Nadal	2	6	2
(Norway) Casper Ruud	6	6
15	(Italy) Fabio Fognini	4	3

Semifinals
(United Kingdom) Dan Evans	2	1
4	(Greece) Stefanos Tsitsipas	6	6
6	(Russia) Andrey Rublev	6	7
(Norway) Casper Ruud	3	5

Final
4	(Greece) Stefanos Tsitsipas	6	6
6	(Russia) Andrey Rublev	3	3

==== Doubles ====
Semifinals
1	(Colombia) Juan Sebastián Cabal (Colombia) Robert Farah	6^{0}	6	[4]
(United Kingdom) Dan Evans (United Kingdom) Neal Skupski	7^{7}	2	[10]
4	(Spain) Marcel Granollers (Argentina) Horacio Zeballos	6	5	[4]
2	(Croatia) Nikola Mektić (Croatia) Mate Pavić	3	7	[10]

Final
(United Kingdom) Dan Evans (United Kingdom) Neal Skupski	3	6	[7]
2	(Croatia) Nikola Mektić (Croatia) Mate Pavić	6	4	[10]

=== Madrid Open ===
==== Singles ====
Quarterfinals
1	(Spain) Rafael Nadal	4	4
5	(Germany) Alexander Zverev	6	6
3	(Austria) Dominic Thiem	3	6	6
(United States) John Isner	6	3	4
(Kazakhstan) Alexander Bublik	5	1
(Norway) Casper Ruud	7	6
8	(Italy) Matteo Berrettini	5	6	6
16	(Chile) Cristian Garín	7	3	0

Semifinals
5	(Germany) Alexander Zverev	6	6
3	(Austria) Dominic Thiem	3	4
(Norway) Casper Ruud	4	4
8	(Italy) Matteo Berrettini	6	6

Final
5	(Germany) Alexander Zverev	6^{8}	6	6
8	(Italy) Matteo Berrettini	7^{10}	4	3

==== Doubles ====
Semifinals
(Germany) Tim Pütz (Germany) Alexander Zverev
3	(Spain) Marcel Granollers (Argentina) Horacio Zeballos	w/o
(Belgium) Sander Gillé (Belgium) Joran Vliegen	4	2
2	(Croatia) Nikola Mektić (Croatia) Mate Pavić	6	6

Final
3	(Spain) Marcel Granollers (Argentina) Horacio Zeballos	1	6	[10]
2	(Croatia) Nikola Mektić (Croatia) Mate Pavić	6	3	[8]

=== Italian Open ===
==== Singles ====
Quarterfinals
1	(Serbia) Novak Djokovic	4	7	7
5	(Greece) Stefanos Tsitsipas	6	5	5
(Italy) Lorenzo Sonego	3	6	6
7	(Russia) Andrey Rublev	6	4	3
Q	(Argentina) Federico Delbonis	5	6^{2}
(United States) Reilly Opelka	7	7^{7}
6	(Germany) Alexander Zverev	3	4
2	(Spain) Rafael Nadal	6	6

Semifinals
1	(Serbia) Novak Djokovic	6	6^{5}	6
(Italy) Lorenzo Sonego	3	7^{7}	2
(United States) Reilly Opelka	4	4
2	(Spain) Rafael Nadal	6	6

Final
1	(Serbia) Novak Djokovic	5	6	3
2	(Spain) Rafael Nadal	7	1	6

==== Doubles ====
Semifinals
Alt	(El Salvador) Marcelo Arévalo (Netherlands) Matwé Middelkoop	4	4
5	(United States) Rajeev Ram (United Kingdom) Joe Salisbury	6	6
(Australia) John Peers (New Zealand) Michael Venus	6^{5}	6^{4}
2	(Croatia) Nikola Mektić (Croatia) Mate Pavić	7^{7}	7^{7}

Final
5	(United States) Rajeev Ram (United Kingdom) Joe Salisbury	4	6^{4}
2	(Croatia) Nikola Mektić (Croatia) Mate Pavić	6	7^{7}

=== Canadian Open ===
==== Singles ====
Quarterfinals
1	(Russia) Daniil Medvedev	2	7^{8}	7^{7}
7	(Poland) Hubert Hurkacz	6	6^{6}	6^{5}
(United States) John Isner	7^{7}	6
11	(France) Gaël Monfils	6^{5}	4
6	(Norway) Casper Ruud	1	4
3	(Greece) Stefanos Tsitsipas	6	6
10	(Spain) Roberto Bautista Agut	3	6^{1}
(United States) Reilly Opelka	6	7^{7}

Semifinals
1	(Russia) Daniil Medvedev	6	6
(United States) John Isner	2	2
3	(Greece) Stefanos Tsitsipas	7^{7}	6^{4}	4
(United States) Reilly Opelka	6^{2}	7^{7}	6

Final
1	(Russia) Daniil Medvedev	6	6
(United States) Reilly Opelka	4	3

==== Doubles ====
Semifinals
1	(Croatia) Nikola Mektić (Croatia) Mate Pavić	7^{7}	7^{14}
4	(Germany) Kevin Krawietz (Romania) Horia Tecău	6^{3}	6^{12}
3	(United States) Rajeev Ram (United Kingdom) Joe Salisbury	6	7
(Belgium) Sander Gillé (Belgium) Joran Vliegen	3	5

Final
1	(Croatia) Nikola Mektić (Croatia) Mate Pavić	3	6	[3]
3	(United States) Rajeev Ram (United Kingdom) Joe Salisbury	6	4	[10]

=== Cincinnati Open ===
==== Singles ====
Quarterfinals
1	(Russia) Daniil Medvedev	6	6
7	(Spain) Pablo Carreño Busta	1	1
4	(Russia) Andrey Rublev	6	3	6
(France) Benoît Paire	2	6	3
8	(Norway) Casper Ruud	1	3
3	(Germany) Alexander Zverev	6	6
12	(Canada) Félix Auger-Aliassime	2	7	1
2	(Greece) Stefanos Tsitsipas	6	5	6

Semifinals
1	(Russia) Daniil Medvedev	6	3	3
4	(Russia) Andrey Rublev	2	6	6
3	(Germany) Alexander Zverev	6	3	7^{7}
2	(Greece) Stefanos Tsitsipas	4	6	6^{4}

Final
4	(Russia) Andrey Rublev	2	3
3	(Germany) Alexander Zverev	6	6

==== Doubles ====
Semifinals
WC	(United States) Steve Johnson (United States) Austin Krajicek	7^{7}	6^{8}	[10]
3	(Colombia) Juan Sebastián Cabal (Colombia) Robert Farah	6^{5}	7^{10}	[3]
Alt	(El Salvador) Marcelo Arévalo (Italy) Fabio Fognini	3	4
2	(Spain) Marcel Granollers (Argentina) Horacio Zeballos	6	6

Final
WC	(United States) Steve Johnson (United States) Austin Krajicek	6^{5}	6^{5}
2	(Spain) Marcel Granollers (Argentina) Horacio Zeballos	7^{7}	7^{7}

=== Indian Wells Open ===
==== Singles ====
Quarterfinals
23	(Bulgaria) Grigor Dimitrov	3	6	7^{7}
8	(Poland) Hubert Hurkacz	6	4	6^{2}
21	(United Kingdom) Cameron Norrie	6	6
11	(Argentina) Diego Schwartzman	0	2
31	(United States) Taylor Fritz	4	6	7^{7}
3	(Germany) Alexander Zverev	6	3	6^{3}
29	(Georgia (country)) Nikoloz Basilashvili	6	2	6
2	(Greece) Stefanos Tsitsipas	4	6	4

Semifinals
23	(Bulgaria) Grigor Dimitrov	2	4
21	(United Kingdom) Cameron Norrie	6	6
31	(United States) Taylor Fritz	6^{5}	3
29	(Georgia (country)) Nikoloz Basilashvili	7^{7}	6

Final
21	(United Kingdom) Cameron Norrie	3	6	6
29	(Georgia (country)) Nikoloz Basilashvili	6	4	1

==== Doubles ====
Semifinals
7	(Australia) John Peers (Slovakia) Filip Polášek	6	7^{7}
8	(Croatia) Ivan Dodig (Brazil) Marcelo Melo	4	6^{1}
(Russia) Aslan Karatsev (Russia) Andrey Rublev	6	4	[10]
(Germany) Tim Pütz (New Zealand) Michael Venus	3	6	[5]

Final
7	(Australia) John Peers (Slovakia) Filip Polášek	6	7^{7}
(Russia) Aslan Karatsev (Russia) Andrey Rublev	3	6^{5}

=== Paris Masters ===
==== Singles ====
Quarterfinals
1	(Serbia) Novak Djokovic	6	6
(United States) Taylor Fritz	4	3
(Australia) James Duckworth	2	7^{7}	5
7	(Poland) Hubert Hurkacz	6	6^{4}	7
6	(Norway) Casper Ruud	5	4
4	(Germany) Alexander Zverev	7	6
Q	(France) Hugo Gaston	6^{7}	4
2	(Russia) Daniil Medvedev	7^{9}	6

Semifinals
1	(Serbia) Novak Djokovic	3	6	7^{7}
7	(Poland) Hubert Hurkacz	6	0	6^{5}
4	(Germany) Alexander Zverev	2	2
2	(Russia) Daniil Medvedev	6	6

Final
1	(Serbia) Novak Djokovic	4	6	6
2	(Russia) Daniil Medvedev	6	3	3

==== Doubles ====
Semifinals
6	(Australia) John Peers (Slovakia) Filip Polášek	6	3	[9]
3	(France) Pierre-Hugues Herbert (France) Nicolas Mahut	2	6	[11]
(United Kingdom) Jamie Murray (Brazil) Bruno Soares	5	3
(Germany) Tim Pütz (New Zealand) Michael Venus	7	6

Final
3	(France) Pierre-Hugues Herbert (France) Nicolas Mahut	3	7^{7}	[9]
(Germany) Tim Pütz (New Zealand) Michael Venus	6	6^{4}	[11]

== See also ==
- ATP Masters 1000 tournaments
- 2021 ATP Tour
- 2021 WTA 1000 tournaments
- 2021 WTA Tour
