= 2016 BRD Bucharest Open =

- Date: 11–17 July
- Edition: 3rd
- Category: WTA International
- Draw: 32S / 16D
- Prize money: $250,000
- Surface: Clay
- Location: Bucharest, Romania
- Venue: Arenele BNR

Champions

Singles
- (Romania) Simona Halep

Doubles
- (Australia) Jessica Moore / (Thailand) Varatchaya Wongteanchai
- BRD Bucharest Open

The 2016 BRD Bucharest Open was a women's professional tennis tournament played on red clay courts. It was the third edition of the tournament and was part of the WTA International category of the 2016 WTA Tour. It took place at Arenele BNR in Bucharest, Romania from 11 July until 17 July 2016. First-seeded Simona Halep won the singles title, her second at the event after 2014.

== Finals ==
=== Singles ===
- (Romania) Simona Halep defeated (Latvia) Anastasija Sevastova, 6–0, 6–0

=== Doubles ===
- (Australia) Jessica Moore / (Thailand) Varatchaya Wongteanchai defeated (Romania) Alexandra Cadanțu / (Poland) Katarzyna Piter, 6–3, 7–6^{(7–5)}

== Points and prize money ==
=== Point distribution ===
Event	W	F	SF	QF	Round of 16	Round of 32	Q	Q3	Q2	Q1
Singles	280	180	110	60	30	1	18	14	10	1
Doubles	280	180	110	60	1	—N/a	—N/a	—N/a	—N/a	—N/a

=== Prize money ===
Event	W	F	SF	QF	Round of 16	Round of 32	Q3	Q2	Q1
Singles	$43,000	$21,400	$11,300	$5,900	$3,310	$1,925	$1,005	$730	$530
Doubles	$12,300	$6,400	$3,435	$1,820	$960	—N/a	—N/a	—N/a	

== Singles main-draw entrants ==
=== Seeds ===
Country	Player	Rank^{1}	Seed
ROU	Simona Halep	5	1
ITA	Sara Errani	21	2
SVK	Anna Karolína Schmiedlová	40	3
GER	Laura Siegemund	42	4
ROU	Monica Niculescu	47	5
MNE	Danka Kovinić	52	6
LAT	Anastasija Sevastova	66	7
TUR	Çağla Büyükakçay	77	8

- ^{1} Rankings as of June 27, 2016.

=== Other entrants ===
The following players received wildcards into the main draw:

- (Romania) Ioana Mincă
- (Romania) Elena Gabriela Ruse
- (Italy) Francesca Schiavone

The following players received entry using a protected ranking:

- (United States) Vania King

The following players received entry from the qualifying draw:

- (Japan) Misa Eguchi
- (Bulgaria) Elitsa Kostova
- (Argentina) Nadia Podoroska
- (Bulgaria) Isabella Shinikova

The following player received entry as a lucky loser:

- (China) Xu Shilin

=== Withdrawals ===
Before the tournament

- (Czech Republic) Denisa Allertová → replaced by (Czech Republic) Barbora Krejčiková
- (Kazakhstan) Zarina Diyas → replaced by (Poland) Paula Kania
- (Italy) Karin Knapp → replaced by (Bulgaria) Sesil Karatantcheva
- (Kazakhstan) Yulia Putintseva → replaced by (Spain) María Teresa Torró Flor
- (Kazakhstan) Yaroslava Shvedova (viral illness) → replaced by (China) Xu Shilin
- (United States) Anna Tatishvili → replaced by (Russia) Polina Leykina

=== Retirements ===
- (Italy) Francesca Schiavone (right shoulder injury)

== Doubles main-draw entrants ==
=== Seeds ===
Country	Player	Country	Player	Rank^{1}	Seed
GEO	Oksana Kalashnikova	KAZ	Yaroslava Shvedova	53	1
POL	Paula Kania	CZE	Barbora Krejčíková	101	2
ROU	Andreea Mitu	POL	Alicja Rosolska	153	3
BEL	Ysaline Bonaventure	ROU	Raluca Olaru	167	4

- ^{1} Rankings as of June 27, 2016.

=== Other entrants ===
The following pairs received wildcards into the main draw:

- (Romania) Cristina Dinu / (Romania) Elena Gabriela Ruse
- (Romania) Irina Maria Bara / (Romania) Nicoleta Dascălu
