= 2018 Masters =

2018 Masters may refer to:

- 2018 Masters Tournament, the 82nd edition of The Masters golf tournament, held at Augusta National Golf Club in Georgia, United States
- 2018 Masters (curling), a Grand Slam of Curling event held during the 2018–19 curling season
- 2018 Masters (darts), sixth staging of the professional darts tournament held by the Professional Darts Corporation
- 2018 Masters (snooker), the 44th edition of the professional invitational snooker tournament held in London, England
- 2018 ATP World Tour Masters 1000, series of nine top-tier men’s tennis tournaments held during the 2018 season

== See also ==
- Masters (disambiguation)
