= 2021 Italian Open – Women's singles =

Women's singles
- 2021 Italian Open

Final
- Champion: (Poland) Iga Świątek
- Runner-up: (Czech Republic) Karolína Plíšková
- Score: 6–0, 6–0

Details
- Draw: 56 (8 Q / 5 WC )
- Seeds: 16

Events
Singles	men	women
Doubles	men	women
← 2020 ·	Italian Open	· 2022 →

Iga Świątek defeated Karolína Plíšková in the final, 6–0, 6–0 to win the women's singles tennis title at the 2021 Italian Open. It was her first WTA 1000 singles title, and the 13 points Świątek lost in the championship match is the fewest on record in a WTA 1000-level final (Serena Williams previously held the record, from the 2015 Miami Open final). This was the first WTA Tour singles final to be resolved with a 'double bagel' scoreline since Simona Halep defeated Anastasija Sevastova at the 2016 Bucharest Open, and was just the tenth such final in WTA Tour history. With the win, Świątek broke into the top 10 of the WTA rankings for the first time. Both finalists saved match points in prior rounds – Świątek saved two match points in her third round match against Barbora Krejčíková, whilst Plíšková saved three match points in her quarterfinal match against Jeļena Ostapenko.

This was Serena Williams' last appearance in Rome, which was ended by the hands of Nadia Podoroska in the straight sets loss in the second round. The loss also ended Williams' 21-match winning streak in the tournament dating back to 2012. The streak includes three Italian Open titles. The last loss before this tournament was in 2010 against Jelena Janković, despite Williams having a match point in the final set.

Simona Halep was the defending champion, but retired due to a left calf muscle tear in the second round against Angelique Kerber.

== Seeds ==
The top nine seeds received a bye into the second round.

1. (Australia) Ashleigh Barty (quarterfinals, retired)
2. (Japan) Naomi Osaka (second round)
3. (Romania) Simona Halep (second round, retired)
4. (United States) Sofia Kenin (second round)
5. (Ukraine) Elina Svitolina (quarterfinals)
6. (Canada) Bianca Andreescu (withdrew)
7. (Belarus) Aryna Sabalenka (third round)
8. (United States) Serena Williams (second round)
9. (Czech Republic) Karolína Plíšková (final)
10. (Switzerland) Belinda Bencic (first round)
11. (Czech Republic) Petra Kvitová (second round)
12. (Spain) Garbiñe Muguruza (third round)
13. (United States) Jennifer Brady (second round, withdrew)
14. (Belgium) Elise Mertens (first round)
15. (Poland) Iga Świątek (champion)
16. (United Kingdom) Johanna Konta (first round)
17. (Greece) Maria Sakkari (second round)

Click on the seed number of a player to go to their draw section.

== Draw ==
=== Key ===
- Q = Qualifier
- WC = Wild card
- LL = Lucky loser
- Alt = Alternate
- ITF = ITF entry
- PR = Protected ranking
- SR = Special ranking
- SE = Special exempt
- JE = Junior exempt
- JR = Junior Accelerator Programme entrant
- CO = College Accelerator Programme entrant
- NG = Next Gen Accelerator Program entrant
- w/o = Walkover
- r = Retired
- d = Defaulted

=== Finals ===
Quarterfinals
1	(Australia) Ashleigh Barty	6	2^{r}
(United States) Coco Gauff	4	1
15	(Poland) Iga Świątek	6	7
5	(Ukraine) Elina Svitolina	2	5
9	(Czech Republic) Karolína Plíšková	4	7	7^{7}
(Latvia) Jeļena Ostapenko	6	5	6^{1}
(Croatia) Petra Martić	7	6
(United States) Jessica Pegula	5	4

Semifinals
(United States) Coco Gauff	6^{3}	3
15	(Poland) Iga Świątek	7^{7}	6
9	(Czech Republic) Karolína Plíšková	6	3	6
(Croatia) Petra Martić	1	6	2

Final
15	(Poland) Iga Świątek	6	6
9	(Czech Republic) Karolína Plíšková	0	0

=== Top half ===
==== Section 1 ====
First round
WC	(Italy) M Trevisan	6	6^{4}	6^{6}
PR	(Kazakhstan) Y Shvedova	0	7^{7}	7^{8}
WC	(France) C Garcia	7^{10}	6
WC	(Italy) E Cocciaretto	6^{8}	2
(Russia) V Kudermetova	4	6	6
14	(Belgium) E Mertens	6	2	3
17	(Greece) M Sakkari	7^{8}	3	6
Q	(Slovenia) P Hercog	6^{6}	6	2
(Kazakhstan) Y Putintseva	5	6	4
(United States) C Gauff	7	4	6
(Spain) S Sorribes Tormo	7^{7}	6^{7}	7
WC	(Italy) C Giorgi	6^{4}	7^{9}	5

Second round
1	(Australia) A Barty	6	6
PR	(Kazakhstan) Y Shvedova	4	1
WC	(France) C Garcia	4	4
(Russia) V Kudermetova	6	6
17	(Greece) M Sakkari	1	6	1
(United States) C Gauff	6	1	6
(Spain) S Sorribes Tormo	5	1
7	(Belarus) A Sabalenka	7	6

Third round
1	(Australia) A Barty	6	6
(Russia) V Kudermetova	3	3
(United States) C Gauff	7	6
7	(Belarus) A Sabalenka	5	3

Quarterfinals
1	(Australia) A Barty	6	2^{r}
(United States) C Gauff	4	1

==== Section 2 ====
First round
PR	(China) S Zheng	2	0
(Czech Republic) B Krejčíková	6	6
LL	(United States) S Stephens	6	2	5
(United States) M Keys	4	6	7
(United States) A Riske	4^{r}
15	(Poland) I Świątek	5
12	(Spain) G Muguruza	6	6
LL	(Romania) PM Țig	1	2
Q	(United States) B Pera	6	6
Q	(Slovenia) T Zidanšek	3	2
(China) Q Wang	5	3
(United States) A Anisimova	7	6

Second round
4	(United States) S Kenin	1	4
(Czech Republic) B Krejčíková	6	6
(United States) M Keys	5	1
15	(Poland) I Świątek	7	6
12	(Spain) G Muguruza	2	6	7
Q	(United States) B Pera	6	0	5
(United States) A Anisimova	6	3	4
5	(Ukraine) E Svitolina	2	6	6

Third round
(Czech Republic) B Krejčíková	6	6^{5}	5
15	(Poland) I Świątek	3	7^{7}	7
12	(Spain) G Muguruza	4	2
5	(Ukraine) E Svitolina	6	6

Quarterfinals
15	(Poland) I Świątek	6	7
5	(Ukraine) E Svitolina	2	5

=== Bottom half ===
==== Section 3 ====
First round
(Latvia) A Sevastova	3	6	6
(Switzerland) J Teichmann	6	1	3
Q	(United States) C McHale	3	0
Q	(Russia) V Zvonareva	6	6
(Poland) M Linette	6	0	2
11	(Czech Republic) P Kvitová	1	6	6
16	(United Kingdom) J Konta	3	1
(Latvia) J Ostapenko	6	6
Q	(Australia) A Tomljanović	6	6
(Czech Republic) M Vondroušová	4	2
(Germany) A Kerber	6	7
Q	(France) A Cornet	2	5

Second round
9	(Czech Republic) Ka Plíšková	6	6
(Latvia) A Sevastova	2	3
Q	(Russia) V Zvonareva	6	3	6
11	(Czech Republic) P Kvitová	4	6	4
(Latvia) J Ostapenko	6	7^{7}
Q	(Australia) A Tomljanović	2	6^{3}
(Germany) A Kerber	1	3
3	(Romania) S Halep	6	3^{r}

Third round
9	(Czech Republic) Ka Plíšková	7	6
Q	(Russia) V Zvonareva	5	3
(Latvia) J Ostapenko	4	6	6
(Germany) A Kerber	6	3	4

Quarterfinals
9	(Czech Republic) Ka Plíšková	4	7	7^{7}
(Latvia) J Ostapenko	6	5	6^{1}

==== Section 4 ====
First round
LL	(Germany) L Siegemund	6	6^{3}	1
(Argentina) N Podoroska	2	7^{7}	6
(Croatia) P Martić	5	6	6
(United States) S Rogers	7	3	4
LL	(France) K Mladenovic	6	6
10	(Switzerland) B Bencic	3	4
13	(United States) J Brady	6	6
(China) S Zhang	1	4
Q	(Ukraine) M Kostyuk	3	1
(Russia) E Alexandrova	6	6
(Russia) D Kasatkina	5	3
(United States) J Pegula	7	6

Second round
8	(United States) S Williams	6^{6}	5
(Argentina) N Podoroska	7^{8}	7
(Croatia) P Martić	7	6
LL	(France) K Mladenovic	5	3
13	(United States) J Brady
(Russia) E Alexandrova	w/o
(United States) J Pegula	7^{7}	6
2	(Japan) N Osaka	6^{2}	2

Third round
(Argentina) N Podoroska	6	1	2
(Croatia) P Martić	3	6	6
(Russia) E Alexandrova	2	4
(United States) J Pegula	6	6

Quarterfinals
(Croatia) P Martić	7	6
(United States) J Pegula	5	4

== Qualifying ==
=== Seeds ===
1. (United States) Sloane Stephens (qualifying competition, lucky loser)
2. (France) Kristina Mladenovic (qualifying competition, lucky loser)
3. (Germany) Laura Siegemund (qualifying competition, lucky loser)
4. (France) Alizé Cornet (qualified)
5. (Romania) Patricia Maria Țig (qualifying competition, lucky loser)
6. (Chinese Taipei) Hsieh Su-wei (first round)
7. (United Kingdom) Heather Watson (first round)
8. (United States) Bernarda Pera (qualified)
9. (Canada) Leylah Annie Fernandez (first round)
10. (Slovenia) Polona Hercog (qualified)
11. (Romania) Irina-Camelia Begu (first round)
12. (Russia) Anastasia Potapova (qualifying competition)
13. (Ukraine) Marta Kostyuk (qualified)
14. (Australia) Ajla Tomljanović (qualified)
15. (Japan) Misaki Doi (first round)
16. (Slovenia) Tamara Zidanšek (qualified)

=== Qualifiers ===
1. (Slovenia) Tamara Zidanšek
2. (Russia) Vera Zvonareva
3. (Australia) Ajla Tomljanović
4. (France) Alizé Cornet
5. (United States) Christina McHale
6. (Ukraine) Marta Kostyuk
7. (Slovenia) Polona Hercog
8. (United States) Bernarda Pera

=== Lucky losers ===
1. (France) Kristina Mladenovic
2. (Germany) Laura Siegemund
3. (United States) Sloane Stephens
4. (Romania) Patricia Maria Țig

=== Draw ===
==== First qualifier ====
First round
1	(United States) Sloane Stephens	6	6
(Spain) Aliona Bolsova	3	4
WC	(Italy) Bianca Turati	1	1
16	(Slovenia) Tamara Zidanšek	6	6

Qualifying competition
1	(United States) Sloane Stephens	4	5
16	(Slovenia) Tamara Zidanšek	6	7

==== Second qualifier ====
First round
2	(France) Kristina Mladenovic	6	2	6
(Switzerland) Leonie Küng	3	6	2
PR	(Russia) Vera Zvonareva	4	6	6
15	(Japan) Misaki Doi	6	3	3

Qualifying competition
2	(France) Kristina Mladenovic	2	5
PR	(Russia) Vera Zvonareva	6	7

==== Third qualifier ====
First round
3	(Germany) Laura Siegemund	6	6
PR	(Russia) Elena Vesnina	3	3
(Czech Republic) Tereza Martincová	6	2	3
14	(Australia) Ajla Tomljanović	2	6	6

Qualifying competition
3	(Germany) Laura Siegemund	7^{7}	3	2
14	(Australia) Ajla Tomljanović	6^{5}	6	6

==== Fourth qualifier ====
First round
4	(France) Alizé Cornet	7^{9}	6^{4}	6
WC	(Italy) Giulia Gatto-Monticone	6^{7}	7^{7}	4
PR	(Germany) Andrea Petkovic	6	5	6
11	(Romania) Irina-Camelia Begu	4	7	3

Qualifying competition
4	(France) Alizé Cornet	6	7^{7}
PR	(Germany) Andrea Petkovic	2	6^{5}

==== Fifth qualifier ====
First round
5	(Romania) Patricia Maria Țig	0	6	7^{7}
PR	(China) Wang Yafan	6	3	6^{4}
(United States) Christina McHale	7^{7}	6
9	(Canada) Leylah Annie Fernandez	6^{2}	4

Qualifying competition
5	(Romania) Patricia Maria Țig	3	6	2
(United States) Christina McHale	6	2	6

==== Sixth qualifier ====
First round
6	(Chinese Taipei) Hsieh Su-wei	2	0
(Japan) Nao Hibino	6	6
WC	(Italy) Nuria Brancaccio	4	0
13	(Ukraine) Marta Kostyuk	6	6

Qualifying competition
(Japan) Nao Hibino	5	3
13	(Ukraine) Marta Kostyuk	7	6

==== Seventh qualifier ====
First round
7	(United Kingdom) Heather Watson	3	2
(Italy) Sara Errani	6	6
WC	(Italy) Lucia Bronzetti	4	3
10	(Slovenia) Polona Hercog	6	6

Qualifying competition
(Italy) Sara Errani	2	3
10	(Slovenia) Polona Hercog	6	6

==== Eighth qualifier ====
First round
8	(United States) Bernarda Pera	6	6
(Russia) Liudmila Samsonova	3	4
(Russia) Margarita Gasparyan	4	6^{1}
12	(Russia) Anastasia Potapova	6	7^{7}

Qualifying competition
8	(United States) Bernarda Pera	6	6
12	(Russia) Anastasia Potapova	4	1

== Championship match statistics ==
Category	(Poland) Świątek	(Czech Republic) Plíšková
1st serve %	15/28 (54%)	18/36 (50%)
1st serve points won	14 of 15 = 93%	8 of 18 = 44%
2nd serve points won	11 of 13 = 85%	2 of 18 = 11%
Total service points won	25 of 28 = 89.29%	10 of 36 = 27.78%
Aces	1	1
Double faults	0	6
Winners	17	5
Unforced errors	4	19
Net points won	2 of 2 = 100%	3 of 5 = 60%
Break points converted	6 of 8 = 75%	0 of 2 = 0%
Return points won	26 of 36 = 72%	3 of 28 = 11%
Total points won	51	13

== WTA singles main-draw entrants ==
=== Seeds ===
The following are the seeded players. Seedings are based on WTA rankings as of 26 April 2021. Rankings and points before are as of 10 May 2021.

Seed	Rank	Player	Points before	Points defending (Note: This also includes points earned in 2020, will count toward a player's ranking until October 2021)	Next best tournament or Rome 2020	Points won	Points after	Status
1	1	(Australia) Ashleigh Barty	10,090	105	100	190	10,175	Quarterfinals, retired against (United States) Coco Gauff
2	2	(Japan) Naomi Osaka	7,650	190	0	1	7,461	Second round, lost to (United States) Jessica Pegula
3	3	(Romania) Simona Halep	6,520	(900)	900	1	6,520	Second round, retired against (Germany) Angelique Kerber
4	5	(United States) Sofia Kenin	5,905	105	65	1	5,865	Second round, lost to (Czech Republic) Barbora Krejčíková
5	6	(Ukraine) Elina Svitolina	5,835	(190)	190	190	5,835	Quarterfinals, lost to (Poland) Iga Świątek [15]
~~6~~	~~7~~	~~(Canada) Bianca Andreescu~~	5,265	(0)	0	0	5,265	Withdrew due to COVID-19 protocols
7	4	(Belarus) Aryna Sabalenka	6,195	(1)	190	105	6,195	Third round, lost to (United States) Coco Gauff
8	8	(United States) Serena Williams	4,850	60	0	1	4,791	Second round, lost to (Argentina) Nadia Podoroska
9	9	(Czech Republic) Karolína Plíšková	4,660	900	585	585	4,345	Runner-up, lost to (Poland) Iga Świątek [15]
10	11	(Switzerland) Belinda Bencic	4,140	(60)	65	1	4,140	First round, lost to (France) Kristina Mladenovic [LL]
11	10	(Czech Republic) Petra Kvitová	4,160	105	1	60	4,115	Second round, lost to (Russia) Vera Zvonareva [Q]
12	12	(Spain) Garbiñe Muguruza	4,110	(350)	350	105	4,110	Third round, lost to (Ukraine) Elina Svitolina [5]
13	13	(United States) Jennifer Brady	3,830	(0)	60	60	3,830	Second round, withdrew due to left foot injury
14	14	(Belgium) Elise Mertens	3,685	(190)	190	1	3,685	First round, lost to (Russia) Veronika Kudermetova
15	15	(Poland) Iga Świątek	3,555	(1)	20	900	4,435	Champion, defeated (Czech Republic) Karolína Plíšková [9]
16	18	(United Kingdom) Johanna Konta	3,236	585	105	1	2,756	First round, lost to (Latvia) Jeļena Ostapenko
17	19	(Greece) Maria Sakkari	3,130	380	80	60	2,830	Second round, lost to (United States) Coco Gauff

=== Other entrants ===
The following players received wild cards into the main singles draw:

- (Italy) Elisabetta Cocciaretto
- (France) Caroline Garcia
- (Italy) Camila Giorgi
- (Italy) Martina Trevisan
- ~~(United States) Venus Williams~~

The following players received entry using a protected ranking:

- (Kazakhstan) Yaroslava Shvedova
- (China) Zheng Saisai

The following players received entry from the singles qualifying draw:

- (France) Alizé Cornet
- (Slovenia) Polona Hercog
- (Ukraine) Marta Kostyuk
- (United States) Christina McHale
- (United States) Bernarda Pera
- (Australia) Ajla Tomljanović
- (Slovenia) Tamara Zidanšek
- (Russia) Vera Zvonareva

The following players received entry as lucky losers:

- (France) Kristina Mladenovic
- (Germany) Laura Siegemund
- (United States) Sloane Stephens
- (Romania) Patricia Maria Țig

=== Withdrawals ===
Before the tournament

- (Canada) Bianca Andreescu → replaced by (France) Kristina Mladenovic
- (Belarus) Victoria Azarenka → replaced by (Poland) Magda Linette
- (Netherlands) Kiki Bertens → replaced by (Latvia) Anastasija Sevastova
- (Tunisia) Ons Jabeur → replaced by (Switzerland) Jil Teichmann
- (Estonia) Anett Kontaveit → replaced by (Spain) Sara Sorribes Tormo
- (Russia) Svetlana Kuznetsova → replaced by (United States) Shelby Rogers
- (Czech Republic) Karolína Muchová → replaced by (United States) Sloane Stephens
- (Russia) Anastasia Pavlyuchenkova → replaced by (Romania) Patricia Maria Țig
- (Kazakhstan) Elena Rybakina → replaced by (Kazakhstan) Yaroslava Shvedova
- (Croatia) Donna Vekić → replaced by (Argentina) Nadia Podoroska
- (United States) Venus Williams → replaced by (Germany) Laura Siegemund
- (Ukraine) Dayana Yastremska → replaced by (Latvia) Jeļena Ostapenko

During the tournament

- (United States) Jennifer Brady

=== Retirements ===
- (Australia) Ashleigh Barty
- (Romania) Simona Halep
- (United States) Alison Riske
