= 2018 WTA Premier Mandatory and Premier 5 tournaments =

Women's professional tennis tour

2018 Premier Mandatory / Premier 5
Details
- Duration: February 12 – October 7
- Edition: 29th
- Tournaments: 9

Achievements (singles)
- Most titles: (Czech Republic) Petra Kvitová (2)
- Most finals: (Romania) Simona Halep (3)

The WTA Premier Mandatory and Premier 5 tournaments, which are part of the WTA Premier tournaments, make up the elite tour for professional women's tennis organised by the WTA called the WTA Tour. There are four Premier Mandatory tournaments: Indian Wells, Miami, Madrid and Beijing and five Premier 5 tournaments: Doha, Rome, Canada, Cincinnati and Wuhan.

== Tournaments ==
Tournament	Country	Location	Surface	Date	Prize money
Qatar Open	Qatar	Doha	Hard	Feb 12 – 18	$3,198,000
Indian Wells Open	United States	Indian Wells	Hard	Mar 5 – 18	$8,648,508
Miami Open	United States	Key Biscayne	Hard	Mar 19 – Apr 1	$8,648,508
Madrid Open	Spain	Madrid	Clay (red)	May 7 – 13	€6,685,828
Italian Open	Italy	Rome	Clay (red)	May 14 – 20	$3,351,720
Canadian Open	Canada	Montreal	Hard	Aug 6 – 12	$2,820,000
Cincinnati Open	United States	Mason	Hard	Aug 13 – 19	$2,874,299
Wuhan Open	China	Wuhan	Hard	Sep 24 – 30	$2,746,000
China Open	China	Beijing	Hard	Oct 1 – 7	$8,285,274

== Results ==
* First-time champion

Tournament	Singles champions	Runners-up	Score	Doubles champions	Runners-up	Score
Doha Singles – Doubles	(Czech Republic) Petra Kvitová	(Spain) Garbiñe Muguruza	3–6, 6–3, 6–4	(Canada) Gabriela Dabrowski	(Slovenia) Andreja Klepač (Spain) María José Martínez Sánchez	6–3, 6–3
Doha Singles – Doubles	(Czech Republic) Petra Kvitová	(Spain) Garbiñe Muguruza	3–6, 6–3, 6–4	(Latvia) Jeļena Ostapenko*	(Slovenia) Andreja Klepač (Spain) María José Martínez Sánchez	6–3, 6–3
Indian Wells Singles – Doubles	(Japan) Naomi Osaka*	(Russia) Daria Kasatkina	6–3, 6–2	(Chinese Taipei) Hsieh Su-wei (Czech Republic) Barbora Strýcová	(Russia) Ekaterina Makarova (Russia) Elena Vesnina	6–4, 6–4
Miami Singles – Doubles	(United States) Sloane Stephens*	(Latvia) Jeļena Ostapenko	7–6^{(7–5)}, 6–1	(Australia) Ashleigh Barty*	(Czech Republic) Barbora Krejčíková (Czech Republic) Kateřina Siniaková	6–2, 6–1
Miami Singles – Doubles	(United States) Sloane Stephens*	(Latvia) Jeļena Ostapenko	7–6^{(7–5)}, 6–1	(United States) CoCo Vandeweghe	(Czech Republic) Barbora Krejčíková (Czech Republic) Kateřina Siniaková	6–2, 6–1
Madrid Singles – Doubles	(Czech Republic) Petra Kvitová (2)	(Netherlands) Kiki Bertens	7–6^{(8–6)}, 4–6, 6–3	(Russia) Ekaterina Makarova (Russia) Elena Vesnina	(Hungary) Tímea Babos (France) Kristina Mladenovic	2–6, 6–4, [10–8]
Rome Singles – Doubles	(Ukraine) Elina Svitolina	(Romania) Simona Halep	6–0, 6–4	(Australia) Ashleigh Barty (2)	(Czech Republic) Andrea Sestini Hlaváčková (Czech Republic) Barbora Strýcová	6–3, 6–4
Rome Singles – Doubles	(Ukraine) Elina Svitolina	(Romania) Simona Halep	6–0, 6–4	(Netherlands) Demi Schuurs*	(Czech Republic) Andrea Sestini Hlaváčková (Czech Republic) Barbora Strýcová	6–3, 6–4
Montréal Singles – Doubles	(Romania) Simona Halep	(United States) Sloane Stephens	7–6^{(8–6)}, 3–6, 6–4	(Australia) Ashleigh Barty (3) (Netherlands) Demi Schuurs (2)	(Chinese Taipei) Latisha Chan (Russia) Ekaterina Makarova	4–6, 6–3, [10–8]
Cincinnati Singles – Doubles	(Netherlands) Kiki Bertens*	(Romania) Simona Halep	2–6, 7–6^{(8–6)}, 6–2	(Czech Republic) Lucie Hradecká (Russia) Ekaterina Makarova (2)	(Belgium) Elise Mertens (Netherlands) Demi Schuurs	6–2, 7–5
Wuhan Singles – Doubles	(Belarus) Aryna Sabalenka*	(Estonia) Anett Kontaveit	6–3, 6–3	(Belgium) Elise Mertens*	(Czech Republic) Andrea Sestini Hlaváčková (Czech Republic) Barbora Strýcová	6–3, 6–3
Wuhan Singles – Doubles	(Belarus) Aryna Sabalenka*	(Estonia) Anett Kontaveit	6–3, 6–3	(Netherlands) Demi Schuurs (3)	(Czech Republic) Andrea Sestini Hlaváčková (Czech Republic) Barbora Strýcová	6–3, 6–3
Beijing Singles – Doubles	(Denmark) Caroline Wozniacki	(Latvia) Anastasija Sevastova	6–3, 6–3	(Czech Republic) Andrea Sestini Hlaváčková (Czech Republic) Barbora Strýcová (2)	(Canada) Gabriela Dabrowski (China) Xu Yifan	4–6, 6–4, [10–8]

== See also ==
- WTA Premier tournaments
- 2018 WTA Tour
- 2018 ATP Masters 1000
- 2018 ATP Tour
