= 2016 BRD Bucharest Open – Doubles =

Doubles
- 2016 BRD Bucharest Open

Final
- Champions: (Australia) Jessica Moore (Thailand) Varatchaya Wongteanchai
- Runners-up: (Romania) Alexandra Cadanțu (Poland) Katarzyna Piter
- Score: 6–3, 7–6^{(7–5)}

Details
- Draw: 16
- Seeds: 4

Events
Singles	Doubles
- BRD Bucharest Open

Oksana Kalashnikova and Demi Schuurs were the defending champions, but Schuurs chose to compete in Gstaad instead. Kalashnikova played alongside Yaroslava Shvedova, but lost in the quarterfinals to Lenka Kunčíková and Karolína Stuchlá.

Jessica Moore and Varatchaya Wongteanchai won the title, defeating Alexandra Cadanțu and Katarzyna Piter in the final, 6–3, 7–6^{(7–5)}.

== Seeds ==
1. (Georgia (country)) Oksana Kalashnikova / (Kazakhstan) Yaroslava Shvedova (quarterfinals)
2. (Poland) Paula Kania / (Czech Republic) Barbora Krejčíková (semifinals)
3. (Romania) Andreea Mitu / (Poland) Alicja Rosolska (quarterfinals)
4. (Belgium) Ysaline Bonaventure / (Romania) Raluca Olaru (first round)

== Draw ==
Key

- Q = Qualifier
- WC = Wild card
- LL = Lucky loser
- Alt = Alternate
- ITF = ITF entry
- PR = Protected ranking
- SR = Special ranking
- SE = Special exempt
- JE = Junior exempt
- JR = Junior Accelerator Programme entrant
- CO = College Accelerator Programme entrant
- NG = Next Gen Accelerator Program entrant
- w/o = Walkover
- r = Retired
- d = Defaulted

First round
1	(Georgia (country)) O Kalashnikova (Kazakhstan) Y Shvedova	6	6
(Switzerland) C Perrin (Brazil) L Pigossi	4	4
(Spain) G García Pérez (Spain) MJ Martínez Sánchez	5	7	[5]
(Czech Republic) L Kunčíková (Czech Republic) K Stuchlá	7	5	[10]
3	(Romania) A Mitu (Poland) A Rosolska	6	6
(Russia) V Ivakhnenko (Russia) M Melnikova	4	4
(Australia) J Moore (Thailand) Vara Wongteanchai	4	7	[10]
(Romania) E Bogdan (Hungary) RL Jani	6	5	[6]
WC	(Romania) C Dinu (Romania) EG Ruse	6	6
(Turkey) B Eraydın (Belarus) L Marozava	3	3
(Romania) A Cadanțu (Poland) K Piter	7	6
4	(Belgium) Y Bonaventure (Romania) R Olaru	5	3
WC	(Romania) IM Bara (Romania) N Dascălu	4	4
(Bulgaria) I Shinikova (Czech Republic) R Voráčová	6	6
(Poland) J Jegiołka (China) S Xu	2	3
2	(Poland) P Kania (Czech Republic) B Krejčíková	6	6

Quarterfinals
1	(Georgia (country)) O Kalashnikova (Kazakhstan) Y Shvedova	1	7	[4]
(Czech Republic) L Kunčíková (Czech Republic) K Stuchlá	6	5	[10]
3	(Romania) A Mitu (Poland) A Rosolska	6	5	[15]
(Australia) J Moore (Thailand) Vara Wongteanchai	2	7	[17]
WC	(Romania) C Dinu (Romania) EG Ruse	6	4	[6]
(Romania) A Cadanțu (Poland) K Piter	1	6	[10]
(Bulgaria) I Shinikova (Czech Republic) R Voráčová	4	6	[6]
2	(Poland) P Kania (Czech Republic) B Krejčíková	6	2	[10]

Semifinals
(Czech Republic) L Kunčíková (Czech Republic) K Stuchlá	6	5	[8]
(Australia) J Moore (Thailand) Vara Wongteanchai	3	7	[10]
(Romania) A Cadanțu (Poland) K Piter	6	7
2	(Poland) P Kania (Czech Republic) B Krejčíková	4	5

Final
(Australia) J Moore (Thailand) Vara Wongteanchai	6	7^{7}
(Romania) A Cadanțu (Poland) K Piter	3	6^{5}
