= 2021 Italian Open – Men's doubles =

Men's doubles
- 2021 Italian Open

Final
- Champions: (Croatia) Nikola Mektić (Croatia) Mate Pavić
- Runners-up: (United States) Rajeev Ram (United Kingdom) Joe Salisbury
- Score: 6–4, 7–6^{(7–4)}

Events
Singles	men	women
Doubles	men	women
- Italian Open

Nikola Mektić and Mate Pavić defeated Rajeev Ram and Joe Salisbury in the final, 6–4, 7–6^{(7–4)}, to win the men's doubles tennis title at the 2021 Italian Open. The second seeds did not drop a set en route to their third ATP Tour Masters 1000 victory together and their sixth title overall of the season. The all-Croatian pair also became the second doubles team to have reached the finals of the first four Masters 1000 tournaments in a season after the Bryan brothers, who last accomplished the feat in 2018. Ram and Salisbury were competing for their first title of the season and their fourth title together.

Marcel Granollers and Horacio Zeballos were the defending champions, but they lost in the quarterfinals to Ram and Salisbury.

== Seeds ==
1. (Colombia) Juan Sebastián Cabal / (Colombia) Robert Farah (first round)
2. (Croatia) Nikola Mektić / (Croatia) Mate Pavić (champions)
3. (Croatia) Ivan Dodig / (Slovakia) Filip Polášek (second round)
4. (Spain) Marcel Granollers / (Argentina) Horacio Zeballos (quarterfinals)
5. (United States) Rajeev Ram / (United Kingdom) Joe Salisbury (final)
6. (United Kingdom) Jamie Murray / (Brazil) Bruno Soares (first round)
7. (Netherlands) Wesley Koolhof / (Netherlands) Jean-Julien Rojer (quarterfinals)
8. (Germany) Kevin Krawietz / (Romania) Horia Tecău (quarterfinals)

== Draw ==
Key

- Q = Qualifier
- WC = Wild card
- LL = Lucky loser
- Alt = Alternate
- ITF = ITF entry
- PR = Protected ranking
- SR = Special ranking
- SE = Special exempt
- JE = Junior exempt
- JR = Junior Accelerator Programme entrant
- CO = College Accelerator Programme entrant
- NG = Next Gen Accelerator Program entrant
- w/o = Walkover
- r = Retired
- d = Defaulted

=== Finals ===
Semifinals
Alt	(El Salvador) Marcelo Arévalo (Netherlands) Matwé Middelkoop	4	4
5	(United States) Rajeev Ram (United Kingdom) Joe Salisbury	6	6
(Australia) John Peers (New Zealand) Michael Venus	6^{5}	6^{4}
2	(Croatia) Nikola Mektić (Croatia) Mate Pavić	7^{7}	7^{7}

Final
5	(United States) Rajeev Ram (United Kingdom) Joe Salisbury	4	6^{4}
2	(Croatia) Nikola Mektić (Croatia) Mate Pavić	6	7^{7}

=== Top half ===
First round
1	(Colombia) JS Cabal (Colombia) R Farah	6^{7}	4
WC	(Italy) F Fognini (Italy) L Musetti	7^{9}	6
Alt	(El Salvador) M Arévalo (Netherlands) M Middelkoop	6	6
(United Kingdom) D Evans (United Kingdom) N Skupski	3	2
Alt	(Uruguay) A Behar (Ecuador) G Escobar	3	7	[16]
(Finland) H Kontinen (France) É Roger-Vasselin	6	5	[14]
WC	(Italy) M Cecchinato (Italy) S Travaglia	6	1	[7]
7	(Netherlands) W Koolhof (Netherlands) J-J Rojer	4	6	[10]
4	(Spain) M Granollers (Argentina) H Zeballos	6	7
(Argentina) A Molteni (Argentina) D Schwartzman	3	5
Alt	(Greece) Pe Tsitsipas (Greece) S Tsitsipas	6^{7}	3
(Poland) Ł Kubot (Croatia) F Škugor	7^{9}	6
(Argentina) M González (France) F Martin	7^{9}	4	[6]
(South Africa) R Klaasen (Japan) B McLachlan	6^{7}	6	[10]
(Belgium) S Gillé (Belgium) J Vliegen	3	6	[10]
5	(United States) R Ram (United Kingdom) J Salisbury	6	2	[12]

Second round
WC	(Italy) F Fognini (Italy) L Musetti	6^{4}	7^{7}	[9]
Alt	(El Salvador) M Arévalo (Netherlands) M Middelkoop	7^{7}	6^{5}	[11]
Alt	(Uruguay) A Behar (Ecuador) G Escobar	6	3	[8]
7	(Netherlands) W Koolhof (Netherlands) J-J Rojer	4	6	[10]
4	(Spain) M Granollers (Argentina) H Zeballos	7	4	[12]
(Poland) Ł Kubot (Croatia) F Škugor	5	6	[10]
(South Africa) R Klaasen (Japan) B McLachlan	3	2
5	(United States) R Ram (United Kingdom) J Salisbury	6	6

Quarterfinals
Alt	(El Salvador) M Arévalo (Netherlands) M Middelkoop	2	7^{7}	[10]
7	(Netherlands) W Koolhof (Netherlands) J-J Rojer	6	6^{3}	[5]
4	(Spain) M Granollers (Argentina) H Zeballos	6^{3}	6	[2]
5	(United States) R Ram (United Kingdom) J Salisbury	7^{7}	3	[10]

Semifinals
Alt	(El Salvador) M Arévalo (Netherlands) M Middelkoop	4	4
5	(United States) R Ram (United Kingdom) J Salisbury	6	6

=== Bottom half ===
First round
8	(Germany) K Krawietz (Romania) H Tecău	6	6
(Croatia) M Čilić (Brazil) M Melo	4	2
(Australia) M Purcell (Australia) L Saville	7	6^{5}	[6]
Alt	(United Kingdom) L Broady (United Kingdom) A Murray	5	7^{7}	[10]
(Australia) J Peers (New Zealand) M Venus	7^{9}	7^{7}
(United States) A Krajicek (Austria) O Marach	6^{7}	6^{4}
(Australia) A de Minaur (Germany) J-L Struff	6^{5}	7	[7]
3	(Croatia) I Dodig (Slovakia) F Polášek	7^{7}	5	[10]
6	(United Kingdom) J Murray (Brazil) B Soares	6	6^{5}	[4]
(Brazil) M Demoliner (Russia) D Medvedev	3	7^{7}	[10]
WC	(Italy) L Sonego (Italy) A Vavassori	5	6	[8]
(France) A Mannarino (France) B Paire	7	4	[10]
(India) R Bopanna (Canada) D Shapovalov	4	4
(New Zealand) M Daniell (Austria) P Oswald	6	6
(Kazakhstan) A Bublik (Chile) C Garín	4	5
2	(Croatia) N Mektić (Croatia) M Pavić	6	7

Second round
8	(Germany) K Krawietz (Romania) H Tecău	6	6
Alt	(United Kingdom) L Broady (United Kingdom) A Murray	3	4
(Australia) J Peers (New Zealand) M Venus	6	7^{7}
3	(Croatia) I Dodig (Slovakia) F Polášek	1	6^{2}
(Brazil) M Demoliner (Russia) D Medvedev	3	6^{2}
(France) A Mannarino (France) B Paire	6	7^{7}
(New Zealand) M Daniell (Austria) P Oswald	6^{4}	6^{2}
2	(Croatia) N Mektić (Croatia) M Pavić	7^{7}	7^{7}

Quarterfinals
8	(Germany) K Krawietz (Romania) H Tecău	6^{5}	5
(Australia) J Peers (New Zealand) M Venus	7^{7}	7
(France) A Mannarino (France) B Paire	4	2
2	(Croatia) N Mektić (Croatia) M Pavić	6	6

Semifinals
(Australia) J Peers (New Zealand) M Venus	6^{5}	6^{4}
2	(Croatia) N Mektić (Croatia) M Pavić	7^{7}	7^{7}

== ATP doubles main-draw entrants ==
=== Seeds ===
Country	Player	Country	Player	Rank^{1}	Seed
COL	Juan Sebastián Cabal	COL	Robert Farah	5	1
CRO	Nikola Mektić	CRO	Mate Pavić	5	2
CRO	Ivan Dodig	SVK	Filip Polášek	17	3
ESP	Marcel Granollers	ARG	Horacio Zeballos	18	4
USA	Rajeev Ram	GBR	Joe Salisbury	25	5
GBR	Jamie Murray	BRA	Bruno Soares	30	6
NED	Wesley Koolhof	NED	Jean-Julien Rojer	36	7
GER	Kevin Krawietz	ROU	Horia Tecău	38	8

- Rankings are as of May 3, 2021.

=== Other entrants ===
The following pairs received wildcards into the doubles main draw:

- (Italy) Marco Cecchinato / (Italy) Stefano Travaglia
- (Italy) Fabio Fognini / (Italy) Lorenzo Musetti
- (Italy) Lorenzo Sonego / (Italy) Andrea Vavassori

The following pairs received entry into the doubles main draw as alternates:

- (El Salvador) Marcelo Arévalo / (Netherlands) Matwé Middelkoop
- (Uruguay) Ariel Behar / (Ecuador) Gonzalo Escobar
- (United Kingdom) Liam Broady / (United Kingdom) Andy Murray
- (Greece) Petros Tsitsipas / (Greece) Stefanos Tsitsipas

=== Withdrawals ===
Before the tournament

- (Canada) Félix Auger-Aliassime / (Poland) Hubert Hurkacz → replaced by (United Kingdom) Liam Broady / (United Kingdom) Andy Murray
- (Hungary) Márton Fucsovics / (Norway) Casper Ruud → replaced by (El Salvador) Marcelo Arévalo / (Netherlands) Matwé Middelkoop
- (Russia) Karen Khachanov / (Russia) Andrey Rublev → replaced by (Greece) Petros Tsitsipas / (Greece) Stefanos Tsitsipas
- (Germany) Tim Pütz / (Germany) Alexander Zverev → replaced by (Uruguay) Ariel Behar / (Ecuador) Gonzalo Escobar
