= 2016 BRD Bucharest Open – Singles =

Singles
- 2016 BRD Bucharest Open

Final
- Champion: (Romania) Simona Halep
- Runner-up: (Latvia) Anastasija Sevastova
- Score: 6–0, 6–0

Details
- Draw: 32
- Seeds: 8

Events
Singles	Doubles
- BRD Bucharest Open

Anna Karolína Schmiedlová was the defending champion, but lost in the first round to Aliaksandra Sasnovich.

Simona Halep won the title for the second time, defeating Anastasija Sevastova in the final, 6–0, 6–0. This was only the ninth WTA singles final in history to be won with a 6–0, 6–0 (a "double bagel") scoreline, and the first since Agnieszka Radwańska won the 2013 Sydney International.

== Seeds ==
1. (Romania) Simona Halep (champion)
2. (Italy) Sara Errani (quarterfinals)
3. (Slovakia) Anna Karolína Schmiedlová (first round)
4. (Germany) Laura Siegemund (semifinals)
5. (Romania) Monica Niculescu (second round)
6. (Montenegro) Danka Kovinić (quarterfinals)
7. (Latvia) Anastasija Sevastova (final)
8. (Turkey) Çağla Büyükakçay (second round)

== Draw ==
Key

- Q = Qualifier
- WC = Wild card
- LL = Lucky loser
- Alt = Alternate
- ITF = ITF entry
- PR = Protected ranking
- SR = Special ranking
- SE = Special exempt
- JE = Junior exempt
- JR = Junior Accelerator Programme entrant
- CO = College Accelerator Programme entrant
- NG = Next Gen Accelerator Program entrant
- w/o = Walkover
- r = Retired
- d = Defaulted

=== Finals ===
Semifinals
1	(Romania) Simona Halep	6^{3}	6	6
PR	(United States) Vania King	7^{7}	4	3
4	(Germany) Laura Siegemund	3	2
7	(Latvia) Anastasija Sevastova	6	6

Final
1	(Romania) Simona Halep	6	6
7	(Latvia) Anastasija Sevastova	0	0

=== Top half ===
First round
1	(Romania) S Halep	3	6	6
(Czech Republic) B Krejčíková	6	1	1
(Ukraine) K Kozlova	2	6	3
Q	(Bulgaria) I Shinikova	6	3	6
(Russia) P Leykina	1	6	7^{9}
LL	(China) S Xu	6	1	6^{7}
Q	(Argentina) N Podoroska	1	0
6	(Montenegro) D Kovinić	6	6
3	(Slovakia) AK Schmiedlová	4	6	5
(Belarus) A Sasnovich	6	1	7
(Belgium) Y Bonaventure	4	2
(France) P Parmentier	6	6
(Poland) P Kania	6^{4}	0
PR	(United States) V King	7^{7}	6
(Slovakia) K Kučová	0	5
8	(Turkey) Ç Büyükakçay	6	7

Second round
1	(Romania) S Halep	6	6
Q	(Bulgaria) I Shinikova	4	3
(Russia) P Leykina	3	2
6	(Montenegro) D Kovinić	6	6
(Belarus) A Sasnovich	6^{3}	4
(France) P Parmentier	7^{7}	6
PR	(United States) V King	7^{7}	4	6
8	(Turkey) Ç Büyükakçay	6^{5}	6	1

Quarterfinals
1	(Romania) S Halep	6	6
6	(Montenegro) D Kovinić	4	2
(France) P Parmentier	3	1
PR	(United States) V King	6	6

Semifinals
1	(Romania) S Halep	6^{3}	6	6
PR	(United States) V King	7^{7}	4	3

=== Bottom half ===
First round
5	(Romania) M Niculescu	6	6
(Romania) A Mitu	2	4
(Bulgaria) S Karatantcheva	1	6	2
(Slovenia) P Hercog	6	2	6
Q	(Japan) M Eguchi	6	6
(Spain) MT Torró Flor	1	2
(Brazil) T Pereira	2	2
4	(Germany) L Siegemund	6	6
7	(Latvia) A Sevastova	6	6
WC	(Romania) EG Ruse	3	4
(Romania) PM Țig	7^{7}	6
WC	(Romania) I Mincă	6^{5}	3
Q	(Bulgaria) E Kostova	2	6^{3}
WC	(Italy) F Schiavone	6	7^{7}
(Serbia) A Krunić	3	2
2	(Italy) S Errani	6	6

Second round
5	(Romania) M Niculescu	4	3
(Slovenia) P Hercog	6	6
Q	(Japan) M Eguchi	4	1
4	(Germany) L Siegemund	6	6
7	(Latvia) A Sevastova	6	6
(Romania) PM Țig	2	2
WC	(Italy) F Schiavone	6	2	0^{r}
2	(Italy) S Errani	1	6	0

Quarterfinals
(Slovenia) P Hercog	2	1
4	(Germany) L Siegemund	6	6
7	(Latvia) A Sevastova	7^{7}	6
2	(Italy) S Errani	6^{4}	3

Semifinals
4	(Germany) L Siegemund	3	2
7	(Latvia) A Sevastova	6	6

== Qualifying ==
=== Seeds ===
1. (Japan) Misa Eguchi (qualified)
2. (Bulgaria) Isabella Shinikova (qualified)
3. (Bulgaria) Elitsa Kostova (qualified)
4. (Russia) Marina Melnikova (second round)
5. (Sweden) Susanne Celik (second round)
6. (Slovakia) Rebecca Šramková (second round)
7. (China) Xu Shilin (qualifying competition, lucky loser)
8. (Serbia) Jovana Jakšić (first round)

=== Qualifiers ===
1. (Japan) Misa Eguchi
2. (Bulgaria) Isabella Shinikova
3. (Bulgaria) Elitsa Kostova
4. (Argentina) Nadia Podoroska

=== Lucky loser ===
1. (China) Xu Shilin

=== Draw ===
==== First qualifier ====
First round
1	(Japan) Misa Eguchi	6	6
(Greece) Valentini Grammatikopoulou	4	1
(Russia) Natalia Vikhlyantseva	6	6
(Chile) Daniela Seguel	0	4
(Thailand) Varatchaya Wongteanchai	5	6^{5}
(Hungary) Réka Luca Jani	7	7^{7}
(Romania) Cristina Dinu	6	6^{4}	6
8	(Serbia) Jovana Jakšić	2	7^{7}	4

Second round
1	(Japan) Misa Eguchi	1	6	6
(Russia) Natalia Vikhlyantseva	6	0	1
(Hungary) Réka Luca Jani	6	6^{3}	7^{7}
(Romania) Cristina Dinu	4	7^{7}	6^{5}

Qualifying competition
1	(Japan) Misa Eguchi	6	6
(Hungary) Réka Luca Jani	1	3

==== Second qualifier ====
First round
2	(Bulgaria) Isabella Shinikova	2	6	6
(Russia) Viktoria Kamenskaya	6	2	1
(Romania) Nicoleta Dascălu	6	6
(Russia) Valentyna Ivakhnenko	4	4
(Italy) Nastassja Burnett	3	2
(Italy) Martina Caregaro	6	6
(Romania) Alexandra Cadanțu	2	2
7	(China) Xu Shilin	6	6

Second round
2	(Bulgaria) Isabella Shinikova	7	3	6
(Romania) Nicoleta Dascălu	5	6	4
(Italy) Martina Caregaro	2	1
7	(China) Xu Shilin	6	6

Qualifying competition
2	(Bulgaria) Isabella Shinikova	1	6	6
7	(China) Xu Shilin	6	4	4

==== Third qualifier ====
First round
3	(Bulgaria) Elitsa Kostova	4	6	6
WC	(Romania) Gabriela Tătăruș	6	1	2
(Spain) Georgina García Pérez	6	4	6
(Australia) Jessica Moore	4	6	1
(Poland) Katarzyna Piter	6	6
WC	(Romania) Miriam Bulgaru	1	4
(Netherlands) Indy de Vroome	3	0^{r}
5	(Sweden) Susanne Celik	6	0

Second round
3	(Bulgaria) Elitsa Kostova	7^{7}	6
(Spain) Georgina García Pérez	6^{4}	3
(Poland) Katarzyna Piter	6	6^{7}	6
5	(Sweden) Susanne Celik	1	7^{9}	3

Qualifying competition
3	(Bulgaria) Elitsa Kostova	6	6
(Poland) Katarzyna Piter	4	2

==== Fourth qualifier ====
First round
4	(Russia) Marina Melnikova	6	3	6
WC	(Hungary) Panna Udvardy	1	6	3
(Bulgaria) Viktoriya Tomova	6	6
(Turkey) Başak Eraydın	2	2
WC	(Hungary) Vanda Lukács	6	5	3
(Argentina) Nadia Podoroska	3	7	6
(Switzerland) Conny Perrin	7^{7}	2	5
6	(Slovakia) Rebecca Šramková	6^{1}	6	7

Second round
4	(Russia) Marina Melnikova	6	6^{3}	2
(Bulgaria) Viktoriya Tomova	4	7^{7}	6
(Argentina) Nadia Podoroska	6	6
6	(Slovakia) Rebecca Šramková	4	4

Qualifying competition
(Bulgaria) Viktoriya Tomova	3	1
(Argentina) Nadia Podoroska	6	6
