= 2021 Italian Open – Women's doubles =

Women's doubles
- 2021 Italian Open

Final
- Champions: (Canada) Sharon Fichman (Mexico) Giuliana Olmos
- Runners-up: (France) Kristina Mladenovic (Czech Republic) Markéta Vondroušová
- Score: 4–6, 7–5, [10–5]

Details
- Draw: 28
- Seeds: 8

Events
Singles	men	women
Doubles	men	women
← 2020 ·	Italian Open	· 2022 →

Hsieh Su-wei and Barbora Strýcová were the defending champions, but Strýcová retired from professional tennis in May 2021. Hsieh played alongside Elise Mertens, but lost in the second round to Sharon Fichman and Giuliana Olmos.

The alternates Fichman and Olmos went on to win the title, defeating Kristina Mladenovic and Markéta Vondroušová in the final, 4–6, 7–5, [10–5], saving 2 championship points, in the process. By reaching the final, Mladenovic usurped newly crowned Mertens for the doubles number 1 ranking.

== Seeds ==
1. (Chinese Taipei) Hsieh Su-wei / (Belgium) Elise Mertens (second round)
2. (Czech Republic) Barbora Krejčíková / (Czech Republic) Kateřina Siniaková (quarterfinals)
3. (United States) Nicole Melichar / (Netherlands) Demi Schuurs (second round)
4. (Japan) Shuko Aoyama / (Japan) Ena Shibahara (semifinals)
5. (Chile) Alexa Guarachi / (United States) Desirae Krawczyk (first round)
6. (Chinese Taipei) Chan Hao-ching / (Chinese Taipei) Latisha Chan (quarterfinals)
7. (China) Xu Yifan / (China) Zhang Shuai (first round)
8. (Canada) Gabriela Dabrowski / (United States) Asia Muhammad (second round)

== Draw ==
=== Key ===
- Q = Qualifier
- WC = Wild card
- LL = Lucky loser
- Alt = Alternate
- ITF = ITF entry
- PR = Protected ranking
- SR = Special ranking
- SE = Special exempt
- JE = Junior exempt
- JR = Junior Accelerator Programme entrant
- CO = College Accelerator Programme entrant
- NG = Next Gen Accelerator Program entrant
- w/o = Walkover
- r = Retired
- d = Defaulted

=== Finals ===
Semifinals
Alt	(Canada) Sharon Fichman (Mexico) Giuliana Olmos	6	6
4	(Japan) Shuko Aoyama (Japan) Ena Shibahara	3	2
WC	(Romania) Irina-Camelia Begu (Italy) Sara Errani	2	3
(France) Kristina Mladenovic (Czech Republic) Markéta Vondroušová	6	6

Final
Alt	(Canada) Sharon Fichman (Mexico) Giuliana Olmos	4	7	[10]
(France) Kristina Mladenovic (Czech Republic) Markéta Vondroušová	6	5	[5]

=== Top half ===
First round
(United States) B Mattek-Sands (United States) J Pegula	6	2	[3]
Alt	(Canada) S Fichman (Mexico) G Olmos	3	6	[10]
WC	(Italy) N Brancaccio (Italy) L Bronzetti	0	0
(United States) C Gauff (Russia) V Kudermetova	6	6
PR	(Russia) A Kudryavtseva (Romania) M Niculescu	2	1
8	(Canada) G Dabrowski (United States) A Muhammad	6	6
(Ukraine) L Kichenok (Latvia) J Ostapenko	3	2
WC	(Italy) G Gatto-Monticone (Italy) B Turati	6	6
(Croatia) D Jurak (Slovenia) A Klepač	2	7	[10]
(Ukraine) N Kichenok (Romania) R Olaru	6	5	[5]
(Russia) D Kasatkina (Croatia) P Martić	2	3
6	(Chinese Taipei) H-c Chan (Chinese Taipei) L Chan	6	6

Second round
1	(Chinese Taipei) S-w Hsieh (Belgium) E Mertens	6	4	[4]
Alt	(Canada) S Fichman (Mexico) G Olmos	1	6	[10]
(United States) C Gauff (Russia) V Kudermetova	7^{7}	6
8	(Canada) G Dabrowski (United States) A Muhammad	6^{2}	2
4	(Japan) S Aoyama (Japan) E Shibahara	6	6
WC	(Italy) G Gatto-Monticone (Italy) B Turati	1	0
(Croatia) D Jurak (Slovenia) A Klepač	3	4
6	(Chinese Taipei) H-c Chan (Chinese Taipei) L Chan	6	6

Quarterfinals
Alt	(Canada) S Fichman (Mexico) G Olmos	1	7^{8}	[10]
(United States) C Gauff (Russia) V Kudermetova	6	6^{6}	[6]
4	(Japan) S Aoyama (Japan) E Shibahara	4	7	[10]
6	(Chinese Taipei) H-c Chan (Chinese Taipei) L Chan	6	5	[6]

Semifinals
Alt	(Canada) S Fichman (Mexico) G Olmos	6	6
4	(Japan) S Aoyama (Japan) E Shibahara	3	2

=== Bottom half ===
First round
7	(China) Y Xu (China) S Zhang	3	1
(Australia) E Perez (China) S Zheng	6	6
WC	(Romania) I-C Begu (Italy) S Errani	1	7	[10]
Alt	(China) Q Wang (China) Y Wang	6	5	[4]
PR	(Russia) E Vesnina (Russia) V Zvonareva	4	6	[10]
(Russia) E Alexandrova (China) Z Yang	6	4	[3]
5	(Chile) A Guarachi (United States) D Krawczyk	4	4
(France) K Mladenovic (Czech Republic) M Vondroušová	6	6
PR	(Japan) M Ninomiya (Kazakhstan) Y Shvedova	4	7	[7]
(Czech Republic) L Hradecká (Germany) L Siegemund	6	5	[10]
(France) C Garcia (Argentina) N Podoroska	1	2
(United States) H Carter (Brazil) L Stefani	6	6

Second round
(Australia) E Perez (China) S Zheng	3	6	[7]
WC	(Romania) I-C Begu (Italy) S Errani	6	3	[10]
PR	(Russia) E Vesnina (Russia) V Zvonareva	7	1	[11]
3	(United States) N Melichar (Netherlands) D Schuurs	5	6	[9]
(France) K Mladenovic (Czech Republic) M Vondroušová	1	6	[10]
(Czech Republic) L Hradecká (Germany) L Siegemund	6	4	[8]
(United States) H Carter (Brazil) L Stefani	2	3
2	(Czech Republic) B Krejčíková (Czech Republic) K Siniaková	6	6

Quarterfinals
WC	(Romania) I-C Begu (Italy) S Errani	6	4	[10]
PR	(Russia) E Vesnina (Russia) V Zvonareva	2	6	[8]
(France) K Mladenovic (Czech Republic) M Vondroušová	2	6	[10]
2	(Czech Republic) B Krejčíková (Czech Republic) K Siniaková	6	4	[3]

Semifinals
WC	(Romania) I-C Begu (Italy) S Errani	2	3
(France) K Mladenovic (Czech Republic) M Vondroušová	6	6

== WTA doubles main draw entrants ==
=== Seeds ===
Country	Player	Country	Player	Rank^{1}	Seed
TPE	Hsieh Su-wei	BEL	Elise Mertens	4	1
CZE	Barbora Krejčíková	CZE	Kateřina Siniaková	15	2
USA	Nicole Melichar	NED	Demi Schuurs	21	3
JPN	Shuko Aoyama	JPN	Ena Shibahara	26	4
CHI	Alexa Guarachi	USA	Desirae Krawczyk	34	5
TPE	Chan Hao-ching	TPE	Latisha Chan	42	6
CHN	Xu Yifan	CHN	Zhang Shuai	47	7
CAN	Gabriela Dabrowski	USA	Asia Muhammad	48	8

- Rankings are as of April 26, 2021.

=== Other entrants ===
The following pairs received wildcards into the doubles main draw:

- (Romania) Irina-Camelia Begu / (Italy) Sara Errani
- (Italy) Nuria Brancaccio / (Italy) Lucia Bronzetti
- (Italy) Giulia Gatto-Monticone / (Italy) Bianca Turati

The following pairs received entry into the doubles main draw using protected rankings:

- (Russia) Alla Kudryavtseva / (Romania) Monica Niculescu
- (Japan) Makoto Ninomiya / (Kazakhstan) Yaroslava Shvedova
- (Russia) Elena Vesnina / (Russia) Vera Zvonareva

The following pairs received entry into the doubles main draw as alternates:

- (Canada) Sharon Fichman / (Mexico) Giuliana Olmos
- (China) Wang Qiang / (China) Wang Yafan

=== Withdrawals ===
Before the tournament

- (Hungary) Tímea Babos / (Russia) Veronika Kudermetova → replaced by (United States) Coco Gauff / (Russia) Veronika Kudermetova
- (Australia) Ashleigh Barty / (United States) Jennifer Brady → replaced by (Canada) Sharon Fichman / (Mexico) Giuliana Olmos
- (United States) Sofia Kenin / (United States) Alison Riske → replaced by (China) Wang Qiang / (China) Wang Yafan
