= 2021 Italian Open – Men's singles =

Tennis tournament

Men's singles
- 2021 Italian Open

Final
- Champion: (Spain) Rafael Nadal
- Runner-up: (Serbia) Novak Djokovic
- Score: 7–5, 1–6, 6–3

Details
- Draw: 56 (8 Q / 5 WC )
- Seeds: 16

Events
Singles	men	women
Doubles	men	women
- Italian Open

Rafael Nadal defeated defending champion Novak Djokovic in the final, 7–5, 1–6, 6–3 to win the men's singles tennis title at the 2021 Italian Open. It was his record-extending tenth Italian Open title and record-equaling 36th and last Masters 1000 title overall (matching Djokovic's tally). Nadal saved two match points en route to the title, in the third round against Denis Shapovalov. This marked the fourth tournament won by Nadal on 10 or more occasions (in addition to the French Open, the Monte-Carlo Masters, and the Barcelona Open), making him the only men’s tennis player to win more than two tournaments 10 or more times.

It was Djokovic's sixth runner-up finish at the Italian Open, a record for the most runners-up finishes at one event on the ATP Tour (Djokovic equaled this record later that year at the US Open). The final marked Djokovic and Nadal's sixth meeting in the Italian Open final (following 2009, 2011, 2012, 2014, and 2019).

Lorenzo Sonego was the first Italian man to reach the semifinals in Rome since Filippo Volandri in 2007.

== Seeds ==
The top eight seeds received a bye into the second round.

1. (Serbia) Novak Djokovic (final)
2. (Spain) Rafael Nadal (champion)
3. (Russia) Daniil Medvedev (second round)
4. (Austria) Dominic Thiem (third round)
5. (Greece) Stefanos Tsitsipas (quarterfinals)
6. (Germany) Alexander Zverev (quarterfinals)
7. (Russia) Andrey Rublev (quarterfinals)
8. (Argentina) Diego Schwartzman (second round)

9. (Italy) Matteo Berrettini (third round)
10. (Spain) Roberto Bautista Agut (third round)
11. (Spain) Pablo Carreño Busta (second round, withdrew)
12. (Belgium) David Goffin (second round)
13. (Canada) Denis Shapovalov (third round)
14. (France) Gaël Monfils (first round)
15. (Poland) Hubert Hurkacz (first round, retired)
16. (Bulgaria) Grigor Dimitrov (first round)

Click on the seed number of a player to go to their draw section.

== Draw ==
Key

- Q = Qualifier
- WC = Wild card
- LL = Lucky loser
- Alt = Alternate
- ITF = ITF entry
- PR = Protected ranking
- SR = Special ranking
- SE = Special exempt
- JE = Junior exempt
- JR = Junior Accelerator Programme entrant
- CO = College Accelerator Programme entrant
- NG = Next Gen Accelerator Program entrant
- w/o = Walkover
- r = Retired
- d = Defaulted

=== Finals ===
Quarterfinals
1	(Serbia) Novak Djokovic	4	7	7
5	(Greece) Stefanos Tsitsipas	6	5	5
(Italy) Lorenzo Sonego	3	6	6
7	(Russia) Andrey Rublev	6	4	3
Q	(Argentina) Federico Delbonis	5	6^{2}
(United States) Reilly Opelka	7	7^{7}
6	(Germany) Alexander Zverev	3	4
2	(Spain) Rafael Nadal	6	6

Semifinals
1	(Serbia) Novak Djokovic	6	6^{5}	6
(Italy) Lorenzo Sonego	3	7^{7}	2
(United States) Reilly Opelka	4	4
2	(Spain) Rafael Nadal	6	6

Final
1	(Serbia) Novak Djokovic	5	6	3
2	(Spain) Rafael Nadal	7	1	6

=== Top half ===
==== Section 1 ====
First round
(United Kingdom) D Evans	3	2
(United States) T Fritz	6	6
Q	(Spain) R Carballés Baena	4	4
Q	(United Kingdom) C Norrie	6	6
Q	(Spain) A Davidovich Fokina	6	7^{7}
16	(Bulgaria) G Dimitrov	4	6^{2}
9	(Italy) M Berrettini	4	6	6
(Georgia (country)) N Basilashvili	6	2	4
(Australia) J Millman	6	6
(Serbia) D Lajović	3	4
(Croatia) M Čilić	4	6	6
(Kazakhstan) A Bublik	6	2	3

Second round
1	(Serbia) N Djokovic	6	7^{7}
(United States) T Fritz	3	6^{5}
Q	(United Kingdom) C Norrie	2	3
Q	(Spain) A Davidovich Fokina	6	6
9	(Italy) M Berrettini	6	6
(Australia) J Millman	4	2
(Croatia) M Čilić	5	2
5	(Greece) S Tsitsipas	7	6

Third round
1	(Serbia) N Djokovic	6	6
Q	(Spain) A Davidovich Fokina	2	1
9	(Italy) M Berrettini	6^{3}	2
5	(Greece) S Tsitsipas	7^{7}	6

Quarterfinals
1	(Serbia) N Djokovic	4	7	7
5	(Greece) S Tsitsipas	6	5	5

==== Section 2 ====
First round
LL	(Japan) Y Nishioka	0	2
(Hungary) M Fucsovics	6	6
WC	(Italy) G Mager	6	6
(Australia) A de Minaur	4	3
(Italy) L Sonego	6	5	6
14	(France) G Monfils	4	7	4
10	(Spain) R Bautista Agut	6	6
Q	(United States) T Paul	3	4
(South Africa) L Harris	5	2
(Chile) C Garín	7	6
LL	(Slovenia) A Bedene	3	1
(Germany) J-L Struff	6	6

Second round
4	(Austria) D Thiem	3	7^{7}	6
(Hungary) M Fucsovics	6	6^{5}	0
WC	(Italy) G Mager	4	4
(Italy) L Sonego	6	6
10	(Spain) R Bautista Agut	7^{7}	6
(Chile) C Garín	6^{5}	3
(Germany) J-L Struff	7^{9}	1	4
7	(Russia) A Rublev	6^{7}	6	6

Third round
4	(Austria) D Thiem	4	7^{7}	6^{5}
(Italy) L Sonego	6	6^{5}	7^{7}
10	(Spain) R Bautista Agut	4	4
7	(Russia) A Rublev	6	6

Quarterfinals
(Italy) L Sonego	3	6	6
7	(Russia) A Rublev	6	4	3

=== Bottom half ===
==== Section 3 ====
First round
(Serbia) F Krajinović	3	7^{7}	4
(Canada) F Auger-Aliassime	6	6^{5}	6
(Russia) K Khachanov	6	4	0
Q	(Argentina) F Delbonis	3	6	6
WC	(Italy) S Caruso	4	1
12	(Belgium) D Goffin	6	6
15	(Poland) H Hurkacz	4	0^{r}
WC	(Italy) L Musetti	6	2
(France) R Gasquet	1	5
(United States) R Opelka	6	7
(Serbia) M Kecmanović	6^{2}	4
(Russia) A Karatsev	7^{7}	6

Second round
8	(Argentina) D Schwartzman	1	3
(Canada) F Auger-Aliassime	6	6
Q	(Argentina) F Delbonis	6	6
12	(Belgium) D Goffin	2	1
WC	(Italy) L Musetti	4	4
(United States) R Opelka	6	6
(Russia) A Karatsev	6	6
3	(Russia) D Medvedev	2	4

Third round
(Canada) F Auger-Aliassime	6^{3}	1
Q	(Argentina) F Delbonis	7^{7}	6
(United States) R Opelka	7^{8}	6
(Russia) A Karatsev	6^{6}	4

Quarterfinals
Q	(Argentina) F Delbonis	5	6^{2}
(United States) R Opelka	7	7^{7}

==== Section 4 ====
First round
Q	(Bolivia) H Dellien	2	7	6
(France) A Mannarino	6	5	2
(Japan) K Nishikori	6	6
(Italy) F Fognini	3	4
(Serbia) L Đere	6	3	1
11	(Spain) P Carreño Busta	4	6	6
13	(Canada) D Shapovalov	6	6
Q	(Poland) K Majchrzak	1	3
WC	(Italy) S Travaglia	6	6
(France) B Paire	4	3
(France) U Humbert	2	4
(Italy) J Sinner	6	6

Second round
6	(Germany) A Zverev	6	6
Q	(Bolivia) H Dellien	2	2
(Japan) K Nishikori	w/o
11	(Spain) P Carreño Busta
13	(Canada) D Shapovalov	7^{7}	6
WC	(Italy) S Travaglia	6^{2}	3
(Italy) J Sinner	5	4
2	(Spain) R Nadal	7	6

Third round
6	(Germany) A Zverev	4	6	6
(Japan) K Nishikori	6	3	4
13	(Canada) D Shapovalov	6	4	6^{3}
2	(Spain) R Nadal	3	6	7^{7}

Quarterfinals
6	(Germany) A Zverev	3	4
2	(Spain) R Nadal	6	6

== Qualifying ==
=== Seeds ===
1. (United Kingdom) Cameron Norrie (qualified)
2. (Spain) Alejandro Davidovich Fokina (qualified)
3. (Slovenia) Aljaž Bedene (qualifying competition, lucky loser)
4. (United States) Tommy Paul (qualified)
5. (Japan) Yoshihito Nishioka (qualifying competition, lucky loser)
6. (United States) Tennys Sandgren (first round)
7. (United States) Frances Tiafoe (qualifying competition, retired)
8. (France) Corentin Moutet (qualifying competition)
9. (Belarus) Egor Gerasimov (first round)
10. (Australia) Alexei Popyrin (first round)
11. (Argentina) Federico Delbonis (qualified)
12. (Brazil) Thiago Monteiro (qualifying competition)
13. (Moldova) Radu Albot (withdrew)
14. (Spain) Jaume Munar (first round)

=== Qualifiers ===
1. (United Kingdom) Cameron Norrie
2. (Spain) Alejandro Davidovich Fokina
3. (Bolivia) Hugo Dellien
4. (United States) Tommy Paul
5. (Poland) Kamil Majchrzak
6. (Spain) Roberto Carballés Baena
7. (Argentina) Federico Delbonis

=== Lucky losers ===
1. (Slovenia) Aljaž Bedene
2. (Japan) Yoshihito Nishioka

=== Qualifying draw ===
==== First qualifier ====
First round
1	(United Kingdom) Cameron Norrie	6	6
(Uruguay) Pablo Cuevas	1	3
(Italy) Marco Cecchinato	6^{4}	6	6
9	(Belarus) Egor Gerasimov	7^{7}	2	3

Qualifying competition
1	(United Kingdom) Cameron Norrie	6	2	6
(Italy) Marco Cecchinato	4	6	4

==== Second qualifier ====
First round
2	(Spain) Alejandro Davidovich Fokina	6	2
WC	(Italy) Flavio Cobolli	2	0^{r}
WC	(Italy) Andrea Pellegrino	6^{5}	2
8	(France) Corentin Moutet	7^{7}	6

Qualifying competition
2	(Spain) Alejandro Davidovich Fokina	6	7^{7}
8	(France) Corentin Moutet	4	6^{5}

==== Third qualifier ====
First round
3	(Slovenia) Aljaž Bedene	6	3	6
WC	(Italy) Gian Marco Moroni	2	6	4
(Bolivia) Hugo Dellien	6	6
14	(Spain) Jaume Munar	4	1

Qualifying competition
3	(Slovenia) Aljaž Bedene	2	1
(Bolivia) Hugo Dellien	6	6

==== Fourth qualifier ====
First round
4	(United States) Tommy Paul	7^{7}	6
(Argentina) Juan Ignacio Londero	6^{5}	3
(Kazakhstan) Mikhail Kukushkin	6^{3}	6^{1}
12	(Brazil) Thiago Monteiro	7^{7}	7^{7}

Qualifying competition
4	(United States) Tommy Paul	7	4	7^{7}
12	(Brazil) Thiago Monteiro	5	6	6^{4}

==== Fifth qualifier ====
First round
5	(Japan) Yoshihito Nishioka	6	7^{7}
(France) Grégoire Barrère	4	6^{1}
(Poland) Kamil Majchrzak	7^{8}	6^{4}	6
10	(Australia) Alexei Popyrin	6^{6}	7^{7}	3

Qualifying competition
5	(Japan) Yoshihito Nishioka	3	1
(Poland) Kamil Majchrzak	6	6

==== Sixth qualifier ====
First round
6	(United States) Tennys Sandgren	5	3
(Spain) Roberto Carballés Baena	7	6
WC	(Italy) Raúl Brancaccio	3	6	6
Alt	(Italy) Federico Gaio	6	4	4

Qualifying competition
(Spain) Roberto Carballés Baena	7	6
WC	(Italy) Raúl Brancaccio	5	4

==== Seventh qualifier ====
First round
7	(United States) Frances Tiafoe	6	7
(Slovakia) Jozef Kovalík	2	5
(United States) Marcos Giron	3	3
11	(Argentina) Federico Delbonis	6	6

Qualifying competition
7	(United States) Frances Tiafoe	7	4	2^{r}
11	(Argentina) Federico Delbonis	5	6	4

== ATP singles main-draw entrants ==
=== Seeds ===
The following are the seeded players. Seedings are based on ATP rankings as of 3 May 2021. Rankings and points before are as of 10 May 2021.

Seed	Rank	Player	Points before	Points defending (Note: Points earned from 2019 and 2020 tournaments will be dropped depending on the best result during those periods. Only 2020 points will be dropped by 50%, including their 2020 points whichever is greater. 2019 points which are higher will still be dropped as normal.)	Points won	Points after	Status
1	1	(Serbia) Novak Djokovic	11,463	1,000	600	11,063	Runner-up, lost to (Spain) Rafael Nadal [2]
2	3	(Spain) Rafael Nadal	9,630	1,000	1,000	9,630	Champion, defeated (Serbia) Novak Djokovic [1]
3	2	(Russia) Daniil Medvedev	9,780	10	45	9,815	Second round lost to (Russia) Aslan Karatsev
4	4	(Austria) Dominic Thiem	8,365	10	90	8,445	Third round lost to (Italy) Lorenzo Sonego
5	5	(Greece) Stefanos Tsitsipas	7,610	360	180	7,430	Quarterfinals lost to (Serbia) Novak Djokovic [1]
6	6	(Germany) Alexander Zverev	6,945	10	180	7,115	Quarterfinals lost to (Spain) Rafael Nadal [2]
7	7	(Russia) Andrey Rublev	6,000	90	180	6,090	Quarterfinals lost to (Italy) Lorenzo Sonego
8	10	(Argentina) Diego Schwartzman	3,765	345	45	3,465	Second round lost to (Canada) Félix Auger-Aliassime
9	9	(Italy) Matteo Berrettini	4,048	180	90	3,958	Third round lost to (Greece) Stefanos Tsitsipas [5]
10	11	(Spain) Roberto Bautista Agut	3,170	0	45	3,215	Third round lost to (Russia) Andrey Rublev [7]
11	12	(Spain) Pablo Carreño Busta	3,050	10	45	3,085	Second round, withdrew due to a low back injury
12	13	(Belgium) David Goffin	2,875	45	45	2,875	Second round lost to (Argentina) Federico Delbonis [Q]
13	14	(Canada) Denis Shapovalov	2,855	360	180	2,675	Third round lost to (Spain) Rafael Nadal [2]
14	15	(France) Gaël Monfils	2,703	10	10	2,703	First round lost to (Italy) Lorenzo Sonego
15	19	(Poland) Hubert Hurkacz	2,543	55	10	2,498	First round retired against (Italy) Lorenzo Musetti [WC]
16	17	(Bulgaria) Grigor Dimitrov	2,586	90	0	2,496	First round lost to (Spain) Alejandro Davidovich Fokina [Q]

=== Other entrants ===
The following players received wild cards into the main singles draw:

- (Italy) Salvatore Caruso
- (Italy) Gianluca Mager
- (Italy) Lorenzo Musetti
- (Italy) Stefano Travaglia

The following players received entry from the singles qualifying draw:

- (Spain) Roberto Carballés Baena
- (Spain) Alejandro Davidovich Fokina
- (Argentina) Federico Delbonis
- (Bolivia) Hugo Dellien
- (Poland) Kamil Majchrzak
- (United Kingdom) Cameron Norrie
- (United States) Tommy Paul

The following players received entry as lucky losers:

- (Slovenia) Aljaž Bedene
- (Japan) Yoshihito Nishioka

=== Withdrawals ===
Before the tournament

- (Croatia) Borna Ćorić → replaced by (Serbia) Miomir Kecmanović
- (Switzerland) Roger Federer → replaced by (United States) Reilly Opelka
- (United States) John Isner → replaced by (Serbia) Laslo Đere
- (Argentina) Guido Pella → replaced by (Japan) Yoshihito Nishioka
- (Norway) Casper Ruud → replaced by (Slovenia) Aljaž Bedene
- (Switzerland) Stan Wawrinka → replaced by (South Africa) Lloyd Harris

During the tournament

- (Spain) Pablo Carreño Busta

=== Retirements ===
- (Poland) Hubert Hurkacz
