= Jessica Moore (tennis) =

Australian tennis player

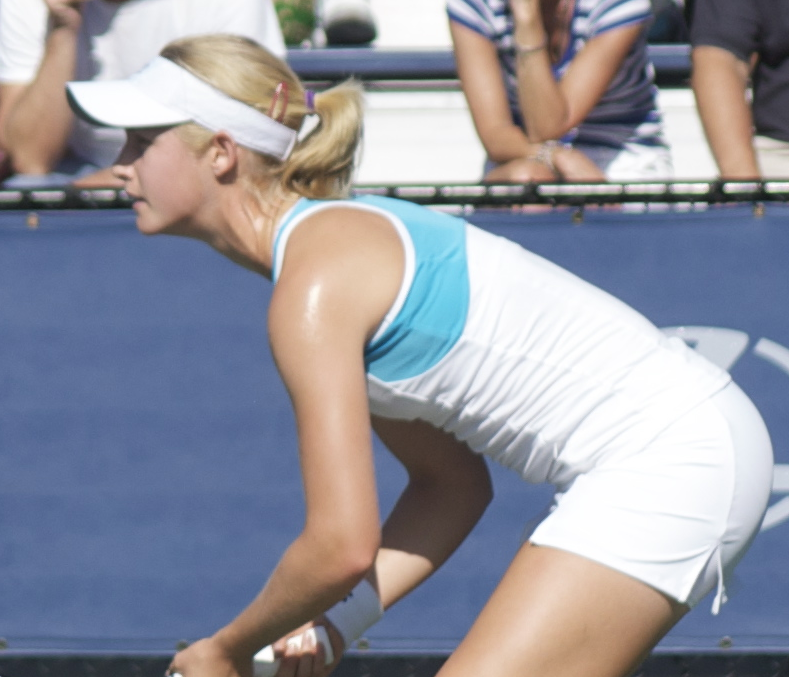
- Country (sports): Australia
- Residence: Williams, Western Australia
- Born: 16 August 1990 (age 36) Perth, Western Australia
- Height: 1.67 m (5 ft 6 in)
- Turned pro: 2008
- Retired: 2020
- Plays: Right-handed (two-handed backhand)
- Prize money: $541,674

Singles
- Career record: 257–223
- Career titles: 4 ITF
- Highest ranking: No. 132 (27 October 2008)

Grand Slam singles results
- Australian Open: 2R (2008, 2009)
- US Open: 2R (2008)

Doubles
- Career record: 301–214
- Career titles: 2 WTA, 31 ITF
- Highest ranking: No. 52 (13 May 2019)

Grand Slam doubles results
- Australian Open: 2R (2016, 2018, 2019)
- French Open: 1R (2019)
- Wimbledon: 1R (2011, 2017, 2018)
- US Open: 1R (2019)

Grand Slam mixed doubles results
- Australian Open: 2R (2008, 2019)
- French Open: 1R (2017, 2019)
Medal record
Representing Australia
Commonwealth Games
Silver medal – second place	2010 Delhi	Women's Doubles

Jessica Moore (born 16 August 1990) is a former professional tennis player from Australia.

Moore won two doubles titles on the WTA Tour, as well as four singles and 31 doubles titles on the ITF Women's Circuit. On 27 October 2008, she reached her best singles ranking of world No. 132. On 13 May 2019, she peaked at No. 52 in the WTA doubles rankings.

Playing for Australia Fed Cup team, Moore has a win–loss record of 1–2.

== Tennis career ==
=== 2008–2009 ===
Moore reached the second round of the 2008 Australian Open, wherein lost to 17th seed Shahar Pe'er. This made her the youngest Australian to win a match at the Australian Open since Jelena Dokić in 1999. Moore also reached the final of the 2008 Australian Open girls' singles, defeating future world No. 1, Simona Halep, in the semifinals. In the final, she lost to Arantxa Rus. She was the first Australian to make the final in 13 years.

After recovering from a shoulder injury, Moore won both the French Open and Wimbledon junior doubles titles with Slovenia's Polona Hercog. At the final Grand Slam tournament of the year, she reached the second round of the US Open after defeating American wildcard Melanie Oudin. However, she lost in the second round to Anna-Lena Grönefeld of Germany.

Moore was awarded a wildcard into the 2009 Australian Open, after improving her ranking up 230 places to 140 in 2008. In the first round, she defeated fellow wildcard Christina McHale, before losing to 12th seed Flavia Pennetta.

=== 2011 ===
In February, Moore and Noppawan Lertcheewakarn reached the final of the Malaysian Open where they lost to Dinara Safina and Galina Voskoboeva. This was Moore's first WTA Tour tournament final.

She then competed in WTA qualifying events, and $100k and $50k events up until July, with a win–loss record of 10–12. After a few years of constantly being on the road, she decided to take an indefinite break and to experience what it was like to live an ordinary life.

=== Since 2015 ===
Moore commenced 2015 by losing in qualifying rounds of the Sydney International and Australian Open before returning to the Australian circuit, where she made three consecutive quarterfinals in Clare, Port Pirie and Mildura (in February and March). Moore then headed to the USA and continued to play on the ITF Circuit. Following a quarterfinal result at Indian Harbour Beach, Moore's ranking re-entered the top 300.

In July 2016, she won her first WTA doubles title at the Bucharest Open, partnering Varatchaya Wongteanchai, to defeat Alexandra Cadanțu and Katarzyna Piter in the final in straight sets.

Moore retired from professional tennis in January 2020.

== WTA Tour finals ==
=== Doubles: 5 (2 titles, 3 runner-ups) ===
Legend Grand Slam tournaments Premier M & Premier 5 Premier International (2–3)	Finals by surface Hard (1–3) Clay (1–0) Grass (0–0) Carpet (0–0)

Outcome	No.	Date	Tournament	Surface	Partner	Opponents	Score
Runner-up	1.	6 March 2011	Malaysian Open	Hard	(Thailand) Noppawan Lertcheewakarn	(Russia) Dinara Safina (Kazakhstan) Galina Voskoboeva	5–7, 6–2, [5–10]
Winner	1.	17 July 2016	Bucharest Open, Romania	Clay	(Thailand) Varatchaya Wongteanchai	(Romania) Alexandra Cadanțu (Poland) Katarzyna Piter	6–3, 7–6^{(7–5)}
Winner	2.	22 September 2018	Guangzhou Open, China	Hard	(Australia) Monique Adamczak	(Montenegro) Danka Kovinić (Belarus) Vera Lapko	4–6, 7–5, [10–4]
Runner-up	2.	14 October 2018	Tianjin Open, China	Hard	(Australia) Monique Adamczak	(United States) Nicole Melichar (Czech Republic) Květa Peschke	4–6, 2–6
Runner-up	3.	7 April 2019	Monterrey Open, Mexico	Hard	(Australia) Monique Adamczak	(United States) Asia Muhammad (United States) Maria Sanchez	6–7^{(2–7)}, 4–6

== ITF Circuit finals ==
Legend
$100,000 tournaments
$50/60,000 tournaments
$25,000 tournaments
$15,000 tournaments
$10,000 tournaments

=== Singles: 10 (4 titles, 6 runner-ups) ===
Result	No.	Date	Tournament	Surface	Opponent	Score
Loss	1.	Jun 2007	ITF Davos, Switzerland	Clay	(Liechtenstein) Stephanie Vogt	4–6, 6–4, 3–6
Win	1.	Jul 2007	ITF Ilkley, England	Grass	(South Africa) Lizaan du Plessis	6–4, 6–2
Win	2.	Oct 2007	ITF Traralgon, Australia	Hard	(Indonesia) Sandy Gumulya	6–4, 6–4
Win	3.	Jul 2008	ITF Rome, Italy	Clay	(Austria) Patricia Mayr-Achleitner	6–3, 6–2
Loss	2.	May 2012	ITF Hilton Head, United States	Hard	(Japan) Mayo Hibi	3–6, 1–6
Win	4.	Jul 2012	ITF Knokke, Belgium	Clay	(Belgium) Ysaline Bonaventure	6–1, 7–6^{(7)}
Loss	3.	Mar 2013	ITF Sydney, Australia	Hard	(Australia) Viktorija Rajicic	7–5, 3–6, 2–6
Loss	4.	Jun 2013	ITF Bethany Beach, United States	Clay	(United States) Brianna Morgan	6–7^{(7)}, 3–6
Loss	5.	Sep 2013	ITF Cairns, Australia	Hard	(Australia) Azra Hadzic	3–6, 6–3, 2–6
Loss	6.	Oct 2014	ITF Toowoomba, Australia	Hard	(Sweden) Ellen Allgurin	1–6, 3–6

=== Doubles: 43 (31 titles, 12 runner-ups) ===
Result	No.	Date	Tournament	Surface	Partner	Opponents	Score
Win	1.	May 2007	ITF Bournemouth, England	Clay	(Australia) Alenka Hubacek	(Austria) Melanie Klaffner (Switzerland) Nicole Riner	5–7, 6–4, 6–4
Loss	1.	Oct 2007	ITF Rockhampton, Australia	Hard	(Australia) Alison Bai	(United States) Courtney Nagle (United States) Robin Stephenson	4–6, 3–6
Win	2.	May 2008	ITF Galatina, Italy	Clay	(Austria) Melanie Klaffner	(Brazil) Maria Fernanda Alves (Argentina) María Irigoyen	3–6, 6–1, [10–6]
Loss	2.	Jun 2008	ITF Campobasso, Italy	Clay	(Italy) Nicole Clerico	(Argentina) María Irigoyen (Brazil) Roxane Vaisemberg	3–6, 2–6
Loss	3.	Oct 2008	ITF Traralgon, Australia	Hard	(Australia) Jarmila Gajdošová	(South Africa) Natalie Grandin (United States) Robin Stephenson	4–6, 2–6
Win	3.	Feb 2010	Burnie International, Australia	Hard	(Russia) Arina Rodionova	(Hungary) Tímea Babos (Russia) Anna Arina Marenko	6–1, 6–4
Win	4.	Feb 2010	ITF Mildura, Australia	Grass	(Australia) Casey Dellacqua	(Australia) Jarmila Groth (Australia) Jade Hopper	6–2, 7–6
Win	5.	Mar 2010	ITF Sydney, Australia	Hard	(Australia) Casey Dellacqua	(Australia) Sophie Ferguson (Australia) Trudi Musgrave	w/o
Win	6.	May 2010	ITF Bundaberg, Australia	Clay	(Australia) Marija Mirkovic	(Australia) Viktorija Rajicic (Australia) Emelyn Starr	6–3, 1–6, [10–7]
Win	7.	Nov 2010	ITF Kalgoorlie, Australia	Hard	(Australia) Daniella Jeflea	(Hungary) Tímea Babos (Australia) Monika Wejnert	6–4, 2–6, 6–4
Win	8.	Nov 2010	ITF Esperance, Australia	Hard	(Australia) Daniella Jeflea	(Japan) Chiaki Okadaue (Japan) Remi Tezuka	7–6^{(7)}, 6–3
Win	9.	Apr 2012	ITF Indian Harbour Beach, United States	Clay	(Brazil) Maria Fernanda Alves	(Canada) Marie-Ève Pelletier (Ukraine) Alyona Sotnikova	6–7^{(6)}, 6–3, [10–8]
Loss	4.	Jan 2013	Burnie International, Australia	Hard	(Australia) Bojana Bobusic	(Japan) Shuko Aoyama (Japan) Erika Sema	w/o
Loss	5.	Mar 2013	ITF Sydney, Australia	Hard	(Australia) Anja Dokic	(Australia) Alison Bai (Australia) Tyra Calderwood	6–7, 4–6
Loss	6.	May 2013	ITF Raleigh, United States	Clay	(Australia) Sally Peers	(United States) Asia Muhammad (United States) Allie Will	3–6, 3–6
Win	10.	Feb 2014	ITF Port Pirie, Australia	Hard	(Bulgaria) Aleksandrina Naydenova	(Japan) Miyabi Inoue (Japan) Hiroko Kuwata	6–4, 6–3
Loss	7.	Mar 2014	ITF Mildura, Australia	Grass	(Bulgaria) Aleksandrina Naydenova	(South Korea) Jang Su-jeong (South Korea) Lee So-ra	1–6, 6–1, [4–10]
Win	11.	Apr 2014	ITF Glen Iris, Australia	Clay	(Bulgaria) Aleksandrina Naydenova	(Australia) Tammi Patterson (Australia) Ellen Perez	6–4, 6–2
Win	12.	Apr 2014	ITF Melbourne, Australia	Clay	(Bulgaria) Aleksandrina Naydenova	(Japan) Miyu Kato (Japan) Yuuki Tanaka	7–5, 6–7^{(5)}, [10–7]
Win	13.	Oct 2014	ITF Cairns, Australia	Hard	(Australia) Abbie Myers	(Japan) Ayaka Okuno (Australia) Alison Bai	6–2, 6–2
Win	14.	Oct 2014	ITF Toowoomba, Australia	Hard	(Australia) Abbie Myers	(Australia) Lizette Cabrera (Australia) Priscilla Hon	6–3, 6–3
Loss	8.	Oct 2014	ITF Perth, Australia	Hard	(Australia) Abbie Myers	(Ukraine) Veronika Kapshay (France) Alizé Lim	2–6, 6–2, [7–10]
Win	15.	Nov 2014	Bendigo International, Australia	Hard	(Australia) Abbie Myers	(Australia) Naiktha Bains (Australia) Karolina Wlodarczak	6–4, 6–0
Win	16.	Nov 2014	Bendigo International, Australia	Hard	(Australia) Abbie Myers	(Thailand) Varatchaya Wongteanchai (Thailand) Varunya Wongteanchai	3–6, 6–1, [10–6]
Win	17.	Feb 2015	ITF Clare, Australia	Hard	(United States) Jennifer Elie	(Japan) Mana Ayukawa (Japan) Kotomi Takahata	6–3, 7–5
Win	18.	Mar 2015	ITF Port Pirie, Australia	Hard	(Australia) Abbie Myers	(China) Liu Chang (China) Tian Ran	6–0, 6–3
Loss	9.	Apr 2015	ITF Jackson, United States	Clay	(Czech Republic) Kateřina Kramperová	(United States) Alexa Guarachi (United States) Caitlin Whoriskey	7–6^{(4)}, 3–6, [9–11]
Win	19.	Jul 2015	Challenger de Granby, Canada	Hard	(Australia) Storm Sanders	(United Kingdom) Laura Robson (Canada) Erin Routliffe	7–5, 6–2
Win	20.	Aug 2015	ITF Gatineau, Canada	Hard	(Canada) Carol Zhao	(Mexico) Victoria Rodríguez (Mexico) Marcela Zacarías	6–3, 6–4
Win	21.	Aug 2015	ITF Landisville, United States	Hard	(Serbia) Ivana Jorović	(United States) Brynn Boren (United States) Nadja Gilchrist	6–1, 6–3
Win	22.	Oct 2015	ITF Cairns, Australia	Hard	(Australia) Storm Sanders	(United States) Jennifer Elie (United States) Asia Muhammad	6–0, 6–3
Win	23.	Feb 2016	ITF Perth, Australia	Hard	(Australia) Ashleigh Barty	(Australia) Alison Bai (Australia) Abbie Myers	3–6, 6–4, [10–8]
Win	24.	Oct 2016	Canberra International, Australia	Hard	(Australia) Storm Sanders	(Australia) Alison Bai (Australia) Lizette Cabrera	6–3, 6–4
Loss	10.	Mar 2017	ITF Mornington, Australia	Clay	(Thailand) Varatchaya Wongteanchai	(Australia) Priscilla Hon (Hungary) Fanny Stollár	1–6, 5–7
Loss	11.	Apr 2017	ITF Mornington, Australia	Clay	(Thailand) Varatchaya Wongteanchai	(Israel) Julia Glushko (Czech Republic) Barbora Krejčíková	4–6, 6–2, [9–11]
Win	25.	Aug 2017	Vancouver Open, Canada	Hard	(United Kingdom) Jocelyn Rae	(United States) Desirae Krawczyk (Mexico) Giuliana Olmos	6–1, 7–5
Loss	12.	Nov 2017	Canberra International, Australia	Hard	(Australia) Ellen Perez	(United States) Asia Muhammad (Australia) Arina Rodionova	4–6, 4–6
Win	26.	Feb 2018	Launceston International, Australia	Hard	(Australia) Ellen Perez	(United Kingdom) Laura Robson (Russia) Valeria Savinykh	7–6^{(5)}, 6–4
Win	27.	Feb 2018	ITF Perth, Australia	Hard	(Australia) Ellen Perez	(Australia) Olivia Tjandramulia (Australia) Belinda Woolcock	6–7^{(6)}, 6–1, [7–9] ret.
Win	28.	Feb 2018	ITF Perth, Australia	Hard	(Australia) Olivia Tjandramulia	(Australia) Alison Bai (China) Lu Jiajing	7–5, 6–7^{(8)}, [11–9]
Win	29.	Apr 2018	Chiasso Open, Switzerland	Clay	(Croatia) Darija Jurak	(Netherlands) Cindy Burger (Netherlands) Rosalie van der Hoek	7–6^{(6)}, 4–6, [10–8]
Win	30.	May 2018	Empire Slovak Open, Slovakia	Clay	(Kazakhstan) Galina Voskoboeva	(Switzerland) Xenia Knoll (United Kingdom) Anna Smith	0–6, 6–3, [10–7]
Win	31.	Jun 2018	Surbiton Trophy, England	Grass	(Australia) Ellen Perez	(Australia) Arina Rodionova (Belgium) Yanina Wickmayer	4–6, 7–5, [10–3]

== Junior Grand Slam finals ==
=== Girls' singles (0–1) ===
Outcome	Year	Championship	Surface	Opponent	Score
Runner-up	2008	(Australia) Australian Open	Hard	(Netherlands) Arantxa Rus	3–6, 4–6

=== Girls' doubles (2–0) ===
Outcome	Year	Championship	Surface	Partner	Opponents	Score
Winner	2008	French Open	Clay	(Slovenia) Polona Hercog	(Netherlands) Lesley Kerkhove (Netherlands) Arantxa Rus	5–7, 6–1, [10–7]
Winner	2008	Wimbledon	Grass	(Slovenia) Polona Hercog	(Australia) Isabella Holland (Australia) Sally Peers	6–3, 1–6, 6–2
