= 2018 ATP World Tour Masters 1000 =

Men's professional tennis tour

2018 ATP Masters 1000
Details
- Duration: March 8 – November 4
- Edition: 29th
- Tournaments: 9

Achievements (singles)
- Most titles: (Spain) Rafael Nadal (3)
- Most finals: (Serbia) Novak Djokovic (Spain) Rafael Nadal (Germany) Alexander Zverev (3)

The twenty-ninth edition of the ATP Masters Series. The champion of each Masters event is awarded 1,000 rankings points.

== Tournaments ==
Tournament	Country	Location	Surface	Prize money
Indian Wells Masters	USA	Indian Wells, California	Hard	$8,909,960
Miami Open	USA	Key Biscayne, Florida	Hard	$8,909,960
Monte-Carlo Masters	France	Roquebrune-Cap-Martin	Clay	€5,238,735
Madrid Open	Spain	Madrid	Clay	€7,190,930
Italian Open	Italy	Rome	Clay	€5,444,985
Canadian Open	Canada	Toronto	Hard	$5,939,970
Cincinnati Masters	USA	Mason, Ohio	Hard	$6,335,970
Shanghai Masters	China	Shanghai	Hard	$9,219,970
Paris Masters	France	Paris	Hard (indoor)	€5,444,985

== Results ==
* First-time champion
§ Career Golden Masters

Masters	Singles champions	Runners-up	Score	Doubles champions	Runners-up	Score
Indian Wells Singles – Doubles	(Argentina) Juan Martin del Potro*	(Switzerland) Roger Federer	6–4, 6–7^{(8–10)}, 7–6^{(7–2)}	(United States) John Isner (United States) Jack Sock	(United States) Bob Bryan (United States) Mike Bryan	7–6^{(7–4)}, 7–6^{(7–2)}
Miami Singles – Doubles	(United States) John Isner*	(Germany) Alexander Zverev	6–7^{(4–7)}, 6–4, 6–4	(United States) Bob Bryan (United States) Mike Bryan	(Russia) Karen Khachanov (Russia) Andrey Rublev	4–6, 7–6 ^{(7–5)}, [10–4]
Monte Carlo Singles – Doubles	(Spain) Rafael Nadal	(Japan) Kei Nishikori	6–3, 6–2	(United States) Bob Bryan (United States) Mike Bryan	(Austria) Oliver Marach (Croatia) Mate Pavić	7–6 ^{(7–5)}, 6–3
Madrid Singles – Doubles	(Germany) Alexander Zverev	(Austria) Dominic Thiem	6–4, 6–4	(Austria) Alexander Peya	(United States) Bob Bryan (United States) Mike Bryan	5–3 ret.
Madrid Singles – Doubles	(Germany) Alexander Zverev	(Austria) Dominic Thiem	6–4, 6–4	(Croatia) Nikola Mektić*	(United States) Bob Bryan (United States) Mike Bryan	5–3 ret.
Rome Singles – Doubles	(Spain) Rafael Nadal	(Germany) Alexander Zverev	6–1, 1–6, 6–3	(Colombia) Juan Sebastián Cabal* (Colombia) Robert Farah*	(Spain) Pablo Carreño Busta (Portugal) João Sousa	3–6, 6–4, [10–4]
Toronto Singles – Doubles	(Spain) Rafael Nadal	(Greece) Stefanos Tsitsipas	6–2, 7–6^{(7–4)}	(Finland) Henri Kontinen (Australia) John Peers	(South Africa) Raven Klaasen (New Zealand) Michael Venus	6–2, 6–7 ^{(7–9)}, [10–6]
Cincinnati Singles – Doubles	(Serbia) Novak Djokovic^{§}	(Switzerland) Roger Federer	6–4, 6–4	(United Kingdom) Jamie Murray	(Colombia) Juan Sebastián Cabal (Colombia) Robert Farah	4–6, 6–3, [10–6]
Cincinnati Singles – Doubles	(Serbia) Novak Djokovic^{§}	(Switzerland) Roger Federer	6–4, 6–4	(Brazil) Bruno Soares	(Colombia) Juan Sebastián Cabal (Colombia) Robert Farah	4–6, 6–3, [10–6]
Shanghai Singles – Doubles	(Serbia) Novak Djokovic	(Croatia) Borna Ćorić	6–3, 6–4	(Poland) Łukasz Kubot (Brazil) Marcelo Melo	(United Kingdom) Jamie Murray (Brazil) Bruno Soares	6–4, 6–2
Paris Singles – Doubles	(Russia) Karen Khachanov*	(Serbia) Novak Djokovic	7–5, 6–4	(Spain) Marcel Granollers (United States) Rajeev Ram	(Netherlands) Jean-Julien Rojer (Romania) Horia Tecau	6–4, 6–4

== Tournament details ==
Key

- Q = Qualifier
- WC = Wild card
- LL = Lucky loser
- Alt = Alternate
- ITF = ITF entry
- PR = Protected ranking
- SR = Special ranking
- SE = Special exempt
- JE = Junior exempt
- JR = Junior Accelerator Programme entrant
- CO = College Accelerator Programme entrant
- NG = Next Gen Accelerator Program entrant
- w/o = Walkover
- r = Retired
- d = Defaulted

=== Indian Wells Masters ===
==== Singles ====
Quarterfinals
1	(Switzerland) Roger Federer	7	6
23	(South Korea) Chung Hyeon	5	1
(Croatia) Borna Ćorić	2	6	7^{7}
7	(South Africa) Kevin Anderson	6	4	6^{3}
18	(United States) Sam Querrey	5	6	3
32	(Canada) Milos Raonic	7	2	6
6	(Argentina) Juan Martín del Potro	3	6	6
31	(Germany) Philipp Kohlschreiber	6	3	4

Semifinals
1	(Switzerland) Roger Federer	5	6	6
(Croatia) Borna Ćorić	7	4	4
32	(Canada) Milos Raonic	2	3
6	(Argentina) Juan Martín del Potro	6	6

Final
1	(Switzerland) Roger Federer	4	7^{10}	6^{2}
6	(Argentina) Juan Martín del Potro	6	6^{8}	7^{7}

==== Doubles ====
Semifinals
(United States) John Isner (United States) Jack Sock	6	6
3	(Austria) Oliver Marach (Croatia) Mate Pavić	3	2
(Uruguay) Pablo Cuevas (Argentina) Horacio Zeballos	6^{5}	4
7	(United States) Bob Bryan (United States) Mike Bryan	7^{7}	6

Final
(United States) John Isner (United States) Jack Sock	7^{7}	7^{7}
7	(United States) Bob Bryan (United States) Mike Bryan	6^{4}	6^{2}

=== Miami Open ===
==== Singles ====
Quarterfinals
16	(Spain) Pablo Carreño Busta	6	5	7^{8}
6	(South Africa) Kevin Anderson	4	7	6^{6}
4	(Germany) Alexander Zverev	6	6
29	(Croatia) Borna Ćorić	4	4
5	(Argentina) Juan Martín del Potro	5	7^{7}	7^{7}
20	(Canada) Milos Raonic	7	6^{1}	6^{3}
19	(South Korea) Chung Hyeon	1	4
14	(United States) John Isner	6	6

Semifinals
16	(Spain) Pablo Carreño Busta	6^{4}	2
4	(Germany) Alexander Zverev	7^{7}	6
5	(Argentina) Juan Martín del Potro	1	6^{2}
14	(United States) John Isner	6	7^{7}

Final
4	(Germany) Alexander Zverev	7^{7}	4	4
14	(United States) John Isner	6^{4}	6	6

==== Doubles ====
Semifinals
(United States) Steve Johnson (United States) Sam Querrey	3	1
(Russia) Karen Khachanov (Russia) Andrey Rublev	6	6
4	(United States) Bob Bryan (United States) Mike Bryan	7	6
(Japan) Ben McLachlan (Germany) Jan-Lennard Struff	5	4

Final
(Russia) Karen Khachanov (Russia) Andrey Rublev	6	6^{5}	[4]
4	(United States) Bob Bryan (United States) Mike Bryan	4	7^{7}	[10]

=== Monte-Carlo Masters ===
==== Singles ====
Quarterfinals
1	(Spain) Rafael Nadal	6	6
5	(Austria) Dominic Thiem	0	2
4	(Bulgaria) Grigor Dimitrov	6	7^{7}
6	(Belgium) David Goffin	4	6^{5}
(France) Richard Gasquet	6	2	5
3	(Germany) Alexander Zverev	4	6	7
(Japan) Kei Nishikori	6	6^{1}	6
2	(Croatia) Marin Čilić	4	7^{7}	3

Semifinals
1	(Spain) Rafael Nadal	6	6
4	(Bulgaria) Grigor Dimitrov	4	1
3	(Germany) Alexander Zverev	6	3	4
(Japan) Kei Nishikori	3	6	6

Final
1	(Spain) Rafael Nadal	6	6
(Japan) Kei Nishikori	3	2

==== Doubles ====
Semifinals
WC	(Italy) Simone Bolelli (Italy) Fabio Fognini	6	3	[7]
4	(United States) Bob Bryan (United States) Mike Bryan	4	6	[10]
3	(Austria) Oliver Marach (Croatia) Mate Pavić	7^{7}	4	[10]
(India) Rohan Bopanna (France) Édouard Roger-Vasselin	6^{4}	6	[7]

Final
4	(United States) Bob Bryan (United States) Mike Bryan	7^{7}	6
3	(Austria) Oliver Marach (Croatia) Mate Pavić	6^{5}	3

=== Madrid Open ===
==== Singles ====
Quarterfinals
1	(Spain) Rafael Nadal	5	3
5	(Austria) Dominic Thiem	7	6
Q	(Serbia) Dušan Lajović	6^{3}	6	3
6	(South Africa) Kevin Anderson	7^{7}	3	6
(United Kingdom) Kyle Edmund	5	7^{8}	4
(Canada) Denis Shapovalov	7	6^{6}	6
7	(United States) John Isner	4	5
2	(Germany) Alexander Zverev	6	7

Semifinals
5	(Austria) Dominic Thiem	6	6
6	(South Africa) Kevin Anderson	4	2
(Canada) Denis Shapovalov	4	1
2	(Germany) Alexander Zverev	6	6

Final
5	(Austria) Dominic Thiem	4	4
2	(Germany) Alexander Zverev	6	6

==== Doubles ====
Semifinals
6	(Colombia) Juan Sebastián Cabal (Colombia) Robert Farah	3	6	[3]
(Croatia) Nikola Mektić (Austria) Alexander Peya	6	3	[10]
4	(France) Pierre-Hugues Herbert (France) Nicolas Mahut	1	6^{2}
2	(United States) Bob Bryan (United States) Mike Bryan	6	7^{7}

Final
(Croatia) Nikola Mektić (Austria) Alexander Peya	5
2	(United States) Bob Bryan (United States) Mike Bryan	3^{r}

=== Italian Open ===
==== Singles ====
Quarterfinals
1	(Spain) Rafael Nadal	4	6	6
(Italy) Fabio Fognini	6	1	2
(Japan) Kei Nishikori	6	1	3
11	(Serbia) Novak Djokovic	2	6	6
10	(Spain) Pablo Carreño Busta	3	3
4	(Croatia) Marin Čilić	6	6
9	(Belgium) David Goffin	4	6	3
2	(Germany) Alexander Zverev	6	3	6

Semifinals
1	(Spain) Rafael Nadal	7^{7}	6
11	(Serbia) Novak Djokovic	6^{4}	3
4	(Croatia) Marin Čilić	6^{13}	5
2	(Germany) Alexander Zverev	7^{15}	7

Final
1	(Spain) Rafael Nadal	6	1	6
2	(Germany) Alexander Zverev	1	6	3

==== Doubles ====
Semifinals
6	(Colombia) Juan Sebastián Cabal (Colombia) Robert Farah	7^{7}	3	[10]
5	(United Kingdom) Jamie Murray (Brazil) Bruno Soares	6^{4}	6	[8]
Alt	(Spain) Pablo Carreño Busta (Portugal) João Sousa	3	7^{7}	[10]
(Uruguay) Pablo Cuevas (Spain) Marcel Granollers	6	6^{5}	[5]

Final
6	(Colombia) Juan Sebastián Cabal (Colombia) Robert Farah	3	6	[10]
Alt	(Spain) Pablo Carreño Busta (Portugal) João Sousa	6	4	[4]

=== Canadian Open ===
==== Singles ====
Quarterfinals
1	(Spain) Rafael Nadal	2	6	6
6	(Croatia) Marin Čilić	6	4	4
(Netherlands) Robin Haase	3	1
(Russia) Karen Khachanov	6	6
5	(Bulgaria) Grigor Dimitrov	2	2
4	(South Africa) Kevin Anderson	6	6
(Greece) Stefanos Tsitsipas	3	7^{13}	6
2	(Germany) Alexander Zverev	6	6^{11}	4

Semifinals
1	(Spain) Rafael Nadal	7^{7}	6
(Russia) Karen Khachanov	6^{3}	4
4	(South Africa) Kevin Anderson	7^{7}	4	6^{7}
(Greece) Stefanos Tsitsipas	6^{4}	6	7^{9}

Final
1	(Spain) Rafael Nadal	6	7^{7}
(Greece) Stefanos Tsitsipas	2	6^{4}

==== Doubles ====
Semifinals
1	(Austria) Oliver Marach (Croatia) Mate Pavić	6	6^{5}	[3]
(South Africa) Raven Klaasen (New Zealand) Michael Venus	4	7^{7}	[10]
(Croatia) Nikola Mektić (Austria) Alexander Peya	6^{2}	6	[10]
2	(Finland) Henri Kontinen (Australia) John Peers	7^{7}	4	[12]

Final
(South Africa) Raven Klaasen (New Zealand) Michael Venus	2	7^{9}	[6]
2	(Finland) Henri Kontinen (Australia) John Peers	6	6^{7}	[10]

=== Cincinnati Masters ===
==== Singles ====
Quarterfinals
(Canada) Milos Raonic	5	6	3
10	(Serbia) Novak Djokovic	7	4	6
13	(Spain) Pablo Carreño Busta	6^{7}	4
7	(Croatia) Marin Čilić	7^{9}	6
11	(Belgium) David Goffin	7^{7}	7^{7}
4	(Argentina) Juan Martín del Potro	6^{5}	6^{4}
WC	(Switzerland) Stan Wawrinka	7^{7}	6^{6}	2
2	(Switzerland) Roger Federer	6^{2}	7^{8}	6

Semifinals
10	(Serbia) Novak Djokovic	6	3	6
7	(Croatia) Marin Čilić	4	6	3
11	(Belgium) David Goffin	6^{3}	1^{r}
2	(Switzerland) Roger Federer	7^{7}	1

Final
10	(Serbia) Novak Djokovic	6	6
2	(Switzerland) Roger Federer	4	4

==== Doubles ====
Semifinals
7	(Colombia) Juan Sebastián Cabal (Colombia) Robert Farah	7^{7}	6
(Germany) Philipp Kohlschreiber (Spain) Fernando Verdasco	6^{5}	4
4	(United Kingdom) Jamie Murray (Brazil) Bruno Soares	6^{7}	6	[10]
6	(Netherlands) Jean-Julien Rojer (Romania) Horia Tecău	7^{9}	2	[6]

Final
7	(Colombia) Juan Sebastián Cabal (Colombia) Robert Farah	6	3	[6]
4	(United Kingdom) Jamie Murray (Brazil) Bruno Soares	4	6	[10]

=== Shanghai Masters ===
==== Singles ====
Quarterfinals
1	(Switzerland) Roger Federer	6	7^{7}
8	(Japan) Kei Nishikori	4	6^{4}
13	(Croatia) Borna Ćorić	7	6
(Australia) Matthew Ebden	5	4
11	(United Kingdom) Kyle Edmund	4	4
4	(Germany) Alexander Zverev	6	6
7	(South Africa) Kevin Anderson	6^{1}	3
2	(Serbia) Novak Djokovic	7^{7}	6

Semifinals
1	(Switzerland) Roger Federer	4	4
13	(Croatia) Borna Ćorić	6	6
4	(Germany) Alexander Zverev	2	1
2	(Serbia) Novak Djokovic	6	6

Final
13	(Croatia) Borna Ćorić	3	4
2	(Serbia) Novak Djokovic	6	6

==== Doubles ====
Semifinals
5	(Colombia) Juan Sebastián Cabal (Colombia) Robert Farah	3	4
6	(United Kingdom) Jamie Murray (Brazil) Bruno Soares	6	6
3	(Poland) Łukasz Kubot (Brazil) Marcelo Melo	6	7
2	(Austria) Oliver Marach (Croatia) Mate Pavić	2	5

Final
6	(United Kingdom) Jamie Murray (Brazil) Bruno Soares	4	2
3	(Poland) Łukasz Kubot (Brazil) Marcelo Melo	6	6

=== Paris Masters ===
==== Singles ====
Quarterfinals
16	(United States) Jack Sock	6	4	4
6	(Austria) Dominic Thiem	4	6	6
4	(Germany) Alexander Zverev	1	2
(Russia) Karen Khachanov	6	6
10	(Japan) Kei Nishikori	4	4
3	(Switzerland) Roger Federer	6	6
5	(Croatia) Marin Čilić	6	2	3
2	(Serbia) Novak Djokovic	4	6	6

Semifinals
6	(Austria) Dominic Thiem	4	1
(Russia) Karen Khachanov	6	6
3	(Switzerland) Roger Federer	6^{6}	7	6^{3}
2	(Serbia) Novak Djokovic	7^{8}	5	7^{7}

Final
(Russia) Karen Khachanov	7	6
2	(Serbia) Novak Djokovic	5	4

==== Doubles ====
Semifinals
1	(Austria) Oliver Marach (Croatia) Mate Pavić
(Spain) Marcel Granollers (United States) Rajeev Ram	w/o
(Netherlands) Jean-Julien Rojer (Romania) Horia Tecău	6	7
2	(United States) Mike Bryan (United States) Jack Sock	1	5

Final
(Spain) Marcel Granollers (United States) Rajeev Ram	6	6
(Netherlands) Jean-Julien Rojer (Romania) Horia Tecău	4	4

== See also ==
- ATP Tour Masters 1000
- 2018 ATP Tour
- 2018 WTA Premier Mandatory and Premier 5 tournaments
- 2018 WTA Tour
