= 2021 Italian Open (tennis) =

- Date: 9–16 May
- Edition: 78th
- Category: ATP Masters 1000 (men); WTA 1000 (women)
- Draw: 56S / 32D (men); 56S / 28D (women)
- Prize money: €2,563,710 (men) €1,577,613 (women)
- Surface: Clay / outdoor
- Location: Rome, Italy
- Venue: Foro Italico

Champions

Men's singles
- (Spain) Rafael Nadal

Women's singles
- (Poland) Iga Świątek

Men's doubles
- (Croatia) Nikola Mektić / (Croatia) Mate Pavić

Women's doubles
- (Canada) Sharon Fichman / (Mexico) Giuliana Olmos
← 2020 ·	Italian Open	· 2022 →

The 2021 Italian Open (also known as the Rome Masters or the Internazionali BNL d'Italia for sponsorship reasons) was a professional tennis tournament played on outdoor clay courts at the Foro Italico in Rome, Italy, 9–16 May 2021. It was the 78th edition of the Italian Open and is classified as an ATP Tour Masters 1000 event on the 2021 ATP Tour and a WTA 1000 event on the 2021 WTA Tour.

== Finals ==
=== Men's singles ===
- (Spain) Rafael Nadal defeated (Serbia) Novak Djokovic, 7–5, 1–6, 6–3

=== Women's singles ===
- (Poland) Iga Świątek defeated (Czech Republic) Karolína Plíšková, 6–0, 6–0

=== Men's doubles ===
- (Croatia) Nikola Mektić / (Croatia) Mate Pavić defeated (United States) Rajeev Ram / (United Kingdom) Joe Salisbury, 6–4, 7–6^{(7–4)}

=== Women's doubles ===
- (Canada) Sharon Fichman / (Mexico) Giuliana Olmos defeated (France) Kristina Mladenovic / (Czech Republic) Markéta Vondroušová, 4–6, 7–5, [10–5]

== Points and prize money ==
=== Point distribution ===
Event	W	F	SF	QF	Round of 16	Round of 32	Round of 64	Q	Q2	Q1
Men's singles	1000	600	360	180	90	45	10	25	16	0
Men's doubles	1000	600	360	180	90	0	—	—	—	—
Women's singles	900	585	350	190	105	60	1	30	20	1
Women's doubles	900	585	350	190	105	1	—	—	—	—

=== Prize money ===
Event	W	F	SF	QF	Round of 16	Round of 32	Round of 64	Q2	Q1
Men's singles	€245,085	€145,000	€82,300	€45,100	€28,200	€18,000	€12,000	€6,100	€3,250
Women's singles	€178,630	€132,258	€70,161	€33,468	€16,935	€10,726	€8,670	€5,080	€2,620
Men's doubles*	€50,000	€35,000	€24,000	€16,250	€11,000	€7,500	—	—	—
Women's doubles*	€50,000	€35,000	€24,000	€16,250	€11,000	€7,500	—	—	—

_{*per team}
