= 2021 Daniil Medvedev tennis season =

- Full name: Daniil Medvedev
- Country: Russia
- Calendar prize money: $8,291,274

Singles
- Season record: 63–13
- Calendar titles: 4
- Current ranking: No. 2
- Ranking change from previous year: ▲2

Grand Slam & significant results
- Australian Open: F
- French Open: QF
- Wimbledon: 4R
- US Open: W

Doubles
- Season record: 2–4
- Calendar titles: 0
- Current ranking: No. 280
- Ranking change from previous year: ▼76

The 2021 Daniil Medvedev tennis season officially began on 2 January 2021, with the start of the ATP Cup.

The season saw him win his first grand slam at the 2021 US Open where he defeated then-world No. 1 Novak Djokovic in the final to deny him the calendar-year Grand Slam.

== All matches ==
This table chronicles all the matches of Daniil Medvedev in 2021.

Key
W	F	SF	QF	#R	RR	Q#	P#	DNQ	A	Z#	PO	G	S	B	NMS	NTI	P	NH

(W) winner; (F) finalist; (SF) semifinalist; (QF) quarterfinalist; (#R) rounds 4, 3, 2, 1; (RR) round-robin stage; (Q#) qualification round; (P#) preliminary round; (DNQ) did not qualify; (A) absent; (Z#) Davis/Fed Cup Zonal Group (with number indication) or (PO) play-off; (G) gold, (S) silver or (B) bronze Olympic/Paralympic medal; (NMS) not a Masters tournament; (NTI) not a Tier I tournament; (P) postponed; (NH) not held; (SR) strike rate (events won / competed); (W–L) win–loss record.
To avoid confusion and double counting, these charts are updated at the conclusion of a tournament or when the player's participation has ended.

=== Singles matches ===
Tournament	Match	Round	Opponent (seed or key)	Rank	Result	Score
ATP Cup; Melbourne, Australia; ATP Cup; Hard, outdoor 2–7 February 2021
ATP Cup; Melbourne, Australia; ATP Cup; Hard, outdoor 2–7 February 2021	1 / 246	RR	(Argentina) Diego Schwartzman	9	Win	7–5, 6–3
ATP Cup; Melbourne, Australia; ATP Cup; Hard, outdoor 2–7 February 2021	2 / 247	RR	(Japan) Kei Nishikori	41	Win	6–2, 6–4
ATP Cup; Melbourne, Australia; ATP Cup; Hard, outdoor 2–7 February 2021	3 / 248	SF	(Germany) Alexander Zverev (6)	7	Win	3–6, 6–3, 7–5
ATP Cup; Melbourne, Australia; ATP Cup; Hard, outdoor 2–7 February 2021	4 / 249	W	(Italy) Matteo Berrettini	10	Win (1)	6–4, 6–2
Australian Open; Melbourne, Australia; Grand Slam tournament Hard, outdoor 8–21 February 2021
Australian Open; Melbourne, Australia; Grand Slam tournament Hard, outdoor 8–21 February 2021	5 / 250	1R	(Canada) Vasek Pospisil	63	Win	6–2, 6–2, 6–4
Australian Open; Melbourne, Australia; Grand Slam tournament Hard, outdoor 8–21 February 2021	6 / 251	2R	(Spain) Roberto Carballés Baena	99	Win	6–2, 7–5, 6–1
Australian Open; Melbourne, Australia; Grand Slam tournament Hard, outdoor 8–21 February 2021	7 / 252	3R	(Serbia) Filip Krajinović (28)	33	Win	6–3, 6–3, 4–6, 3–6, 6–0
Australian Open; Melbourne, Australia; Grand Slam tournament Hard, outdoor 8–21 February 2021	8 / 253	4R	(United States) Mackenzie McDonald (PR)	192	Win	6–4, 6–2, 6–3
Australian Open; Melbourne, Australia; Grand Slam tournament Hard, outdoor 8–21 February 2021	9 / 254	QF	(Russia) Andrey Rublev (7)	8	Win	7–5, 6–3, 6–2
Australian Open; Melbourne, Australia; Grand Slam tournament Hard, outdoor 8–21 February 2021	10 / 255	SF	(Greece) Stefanos Tsitsipas (5)	6	Win	6–4, 6–2, 7–5
Australian Open; Melbourne, Australia; Grand Slam tournament Hard, outdoor 8–21 February 2021	11 / 256	F	(Serbia) Novak Djokovic (1)	1	Loss	5–7, 2–6, 2–6
Rotterdam Open; Rotterdam, Netherlands; ATP 500; Hard, indoor 1–7 March 2021
Rotterdam Open; Rotterdam, Netherlands; ATP 500; Hard, indoor 1–7 March 2021	12 / 257	1R	(Serbia) Dušan Lajović	27	Loss	6–7^{(4–7)}, 4–6
Marseille Open; Marseille, France; ATP 250; Hard, indoor 8 – 14 March 2021
Marseille Open; Marseille, France; ATP 250; Hard, indoor 8 – 14 March 2021	–	1R	Bye			
Marseille Open; Marseille, France; ATP 250; Hard, indoor 8 – 14 March 2021	13 / 258	2R	(Belarus) Egor Gerasimov	76	Win	6–2, 6–4
Marseille Open; Marseille, France; ATP 250; Hard, indoor 8 – 14 March 2021	14 / 259	QF	(Italy) Jannik Sinner	34	Win	6–2, 6–4
Marseille Open; Marseille, France; ATP 250; Hard, indoor 8 – 14 March 2021	15 / 260	SF	(Australia) Matthew Ebden (Q)	287	Win	6–4, 3–0 ret.
Marseille Open; Marseille, France; ATP 250; Hard, indoor 8 – 14 March 2021	16 / 261	W	(France) Pierre-Hugues Herbert	93	Win (2)	6–4, 6–7^{(4–7)}, 6–4
Miami Open; Miami Gardens, United States; ATP 1000; Hard, outdoor 22 March – 4 April 2021
Miami Open; Miami Gardens, United States; ATP 1000; Hard, outdoor 22 March – 4 April 2021	–	1R	Bye			
Miami Open; Miami Gardens, United States; ATP 1000; Hard, outdoor 22 March – 4 April 2021	17 / 262	2R	(Chinese Taipei) Lu Yen-hsun (PR)	1020	Win	6–2, 6–2
Miami Open; Miami Gardens, United States; ATP 1000; Hard, outdoor 22 March – 4 April 2021	18 / 263	3R	(Australia) Alexei Popyrin	86	Win	7–6^{(7–3)}, 6–7^{(7–9)}, 6–4
Miami Open; Miami Gardens, United States; ATP 1000; Hard, outdoor 22 March – 4 April 2021	19 / 264	4R	(United States) Frances Tiafoe	58	Win	6–4, 6–3
Miami Open; Miami Gardens, United States; ATP 1000; Hard, outdoor 22 March – 4 April 2021	20 / 265	QF	(Spain) Roberto Bautista Agut (7)	12	Loss	4–6, 2–6
Monte-Carlo Masters; Monte Carlo, Monaco; ATP 1000; Clay, outdoor 11–18 April 2021
Monte-Carlo Masters; Monte Carlo, Monaco; ATP 1000; Clay, outdoor 11–18 April 2021	Withdrew					
Madrid Open; Madrid, Spain; ATP 1000; Clay, outdoor 3–9 May 2021
Madrid Open; Madrid, Spain; ATP 1000; Clay, outdoor 3–9 May 2021	–	1R	Bye			
Madrid Open; Madrid, Spain; ATP 1000; Clay, outdoor 3–9 May 2021	21 / 266	2R	(Spain) Alejandro Davidovich Fokina (7)	49	Win	4–6, 6–4, 6–2
Madrid Open; Madrid, Spain; ATP 1000; Clay, outdoor 3–9 May 2021	22 / 267	3R	(Chile) Cristian Garín (16)	25	Loss	4–6, 7–6^{(7–2)}, 1–6
Italian Open; Rome, Italy; ATP 1000; Clay, outdoor 9–16 May 2021
Italian Open; Rome, Italy; ATP 1000; Clay, outdoor 9–16 May 2021	–	1R	Bye			
Italian Open; Rome, Italy; ATP 1000; Clay, outdoor 9–16 May 2021	23 / 268	2R	(Russia) Aslan Karatsev	27	Loss	2–6, 4–6
French Open; Paris, France; Grand Slam tournament Clay, outdoor 30 May – 13 June 2021
French Open; Paris, France; Grand Slam tournament Clay, outdoor 30 May – 13 June 2021	24 / 269	1R	(Kazakhstan) Alexander Bublik	37	Win	6–3, 6–3, 7–5
French Open; Paris, France; Grand Slam tournament Clay, outdoor 30 May – 13 June 2021	25 / 270	2R	(United States) Tommy Paul	52	Win	3–6, 6–1, 6–4, 6–3
French Open; Paris, France; Grand Slam tournament Clay, outdoor 30 May – 13 June 2021	26 / 271	3R	(United States) Reilly Opelka (32)	35	Win	6–4, 6–2, 6–4
French Open; Paris, France; Grand Slam tournament Clay, outdoor 30 May – 13 June 2021	27 / 272	4R	(Chile) Cristian Garín (22)	23	Win	6–2, 6–1, 7–5
French Open; Paris, France; Grand Slam tournament Clay, outdoor 30 May – 13 June 2021	28 / 273	QF	(Greece) Stefanos Tsitsipas (5)	5	Loss	3–6, 6–7^{(3–7)}, 5–7
Halle Open; Halle, Germany; ATP 500; Grass, outdoor 14–20 June 2021
Halle Open; Halle, Germany; ATP 500; Grass, outdoor 14–20 June 2021	29 / 274	1R	(Germany) Jan-Lennard Struff	45	Loss	6–7^{(6–8)}, 3–6
Mallorca Championships; Mallorca, Spain; ATP 250; Grass, outdoor 21–26 June 2021
Mallorca Championships; Mallorca, Spain; ATP 250; Grass, outdoor 21–26 June 2021	–	1R	Bye			
Mallorca Championships; Mallorca, Spain; ATP 250; Grass, outdoor 21–26 June 2021	30 / 275	2R	(France) Corentin Moutet	85	Win	6–4, 6–2
Mallorca Championships; Mallorca, Spain; ATP 250; Grass, outdoor 21–26 June 2021	31 / 276	QF	(Norway) Casper Ruud	14	Win	7–5, 6–1
Mallorca Championships; Mallorca, Spain; ATP 250; Grass, outdoor 21–26 June 2021	32 / 277	SF	(Spain) Pablo Carreño Busta (4)	13	Win	3–6, 6–3, 6–2
Mallorca Championships; Mallorca, Spain; ATP 250; Grass, outdoor 21–26 June 2021	33 / 278	W	(United States) Sam Querrey	60	Win (3)	6–4, 6–2
Wimbledon Championships; London, United Kingdom; Grand Slam tournament Grass, outdoor 28 June – 11 July 2021
Wimbledon Championships; London, United Kingdom; Grand Slam tournament Grass, outdoor 28 June – 11 July 2021	34 / 279	1R	(Germany) Jan-Lennard Struff	45	Win	6–4, 6–1, 4–6, 7–6^{(7–3)}
Wimbledon Championships; London, United Kingdom; Grand Slam tournament Grass, outdoor 28 June – 11 July 2021	35 / 280	2R	(Spain) Carlos Alcaraz (WC)	75	Win	6–4, 6–1, 6–2
Wimbledon Championships; London, United Kingdom; Grand Slam tournament Grass, outdoor 28 June – 11 July 2021	36 / 281	3R	(Croatia) Marin Čilić (32)	37	Win	6–7^{(3–7)}, 3–6, 6–3, 6–3, 6–2
Wimbledon Championships; London, United Kingdom; Grand Slam tournament Grass, outdoor 28 June – 11 July 2021	37 / 282	4R	(Poland) Hubert Hurkacz (14)	18	Loss	6–2, 6–7^{(2–7)}, 6–3, 3–6, 3–6
Summer Olympics; Tokyo, Japan; Olympics; Hard, outdoor 24 July – 1 August 2021
Summer Olympics; Tokyo, Japan; Olympics; Hard, outdoor 24 July – 1 August 2021	38 / 283	1R	(Kazakhstan) Alexander Bublik	39	Win	6–4, 7–6^{(10–8)}
Summer Olympics; Tokyo, Japan; Olympics; Hard, outdoor 24 July – 1 August 2021	39 / 284	2R	(India) Sumit Nagal (ITF)	160	Win	6–2, 6–1
Summer Olympics; Tokyo, Japan; Olympics; Hard, outdoor 24 July – 1 August 2021	40 / 285	3R	(Italy) Fabio Fognini (15)	31	Win	6–2, 3–6, 6–2
Summer Olympics; Tokyo, Japan; Olympics; Hard, outdoor 24 July – 1 August 2021	41 / 286	QF	(Spain) Pablo Carreño Busta (6)	11	Loss	2–6, 6–7^{(5–7)}
Canadian Open; Montreal, Canada; ATP 1000; Hard, outdoor 6–15 August 2021
Canadian Open; Montreal, Canada; ATP 1000; Hard, outdoor 6–15 August 2021	–	1R	Bye			
Canadian Open; Montreal, Canada; ATP 1000; Hard, outdoor 6–15 August 2021	42 / 287	2R	(Kazakhstan) Alexander Bublik	39	Win	4–6, 6–3, 6–4
Canadian Open; Montreal, Canada; ATP 1000; Hard, outdoor 6–15 August 2021	43 / 288	3R	(Australia) James Duckworth (Q)	85	Win	6–2, 6–4
Canadian Open; Montreal, Canada; ATP 1000; Hard, outdoor 6–15 August 2021	44 / 289	QF	(Poland) Hubert Hurkacz (7)	13	Win	2–6, 7–6^{(8–6)}, 7–6^{(7–5)}
Canadian Open; Montreal, Canada; ATP 1000; Hard, outdoor 6–15 August 2021	45 / 290	SF	(United States) John Isner	13	Win	6–2, 6–2
Canadian Open; Montreal, Canada; ATP 1000; Hard, outdoor 6–15 August 2021	46 / 291	W	(United States) Reilly Opelka	13	Win (4)	6–4, 6–3
Cincinnati Masters; Cincinnati, United States; ATP 1000; Hard, outdoor 16–22 August 2021
Cincinnati Masters; Cincinnati, United States; ATP 1000; Hard, outdoor 16–22 August 2021	–	1R	Bye			
Cincinnati Masters; Cincinnati, United States; ATP 1000; Hard, outdoor 16–22 August 2021	47 / 292	2R	(United States) Mackenzie McDonald (WC)	64	Win	6–2, 6–2
Cincinnati Masters; Cincinnati, United States; ATP 1000; Hard, outdoor 16–22 August 2021	48 / 293	3R	(Bulgaria) Grigor Dimitrov	21	Win	6–3, 6–3
Cincinnati Masters; Cincinnati, United States; ATP 1000; Hard, outdoor 16–22 August 2021	49 / 294	QF	(Spain) Pablo Carreño Busta (7)	12	Win	6–1, 6–1
Cincinnati Masters; Cincinnati, United States; ATP 1000; Hard, outdoor 16–22 August 2021	50 / 295	SF	(Russia) Andrey Rublev (4)	7	Loss	6–2, 3–6, 3–6
US Open; New York City, United States; Grand Slam tournament Hard, outdoor 30 August – 12 September 2021
US Open; New York City, United States; Grand Slam tournament Hard, outdoor 30 August – 12 September 2021	51 / 296	1R	(France) Richard Gasquet	79	Win	6–4, 6–3, 6–1
US Open; New York City, United States; Grand Slam tournament Hard, outdoor 30 August – 12 September 2021	52 / 297	2R	(Germany) Dominik Koepfer	57	Win	6–4, 6–1, 6–2
US Open; New York City, United States; Grand Slam tournament Hard, outdoor 30 August – 12 September 2021	53 / 298	3R	(Spain) Pablo Andújar	74	Win	6–0, 6–4, 6–3
US Open; New York City, United States; Grand Slam tournament Hard, outdoor 30 August – 12 September 2021	54 / 299	4R	(United Kingdom) Dan Evans (24)	27	Win	6–3, 6–4, 6–3
US Open; New York City, United States; Grand Slam tournament Hard, outdoor 30 August – 12 September 2021	55 / 300	QF	(Netherlands) Botic van de Zandschulp (Q)	117	Win	6–3, 6–0, 4–6, 7–5
US Open; New York City, United States; Grand Slam tournament Hard, outdoor 30 August – 12 September 2021	56 / 301	SF	(Canada) Félix Auger-Aliassime (12)	15	Win	6–4, 7–5, 6–2
US Open; New York City, United States; Grand Slam tournament Hard, outdoor 30 August – 12 September 2021	57 / 302	W	(Serbia) Novak Djokovic (1)	1	Win (5)	6–4, 6–4, 6–4
Laver Cup; Boston, United States; Laver Cup; Hard, indoor 24 – 26 September 2021
Laver Cup; Boston, United States; Laver Cup; Hard, indoor 24 – 26 September 2021	58 / 303	Day 2	(Canada) Denis Shapovalov	12	Win	6–4, 6–0
Laver Cup; Boston, United States; Laver Cup; Hard, indoor 24 – 26 September 2021	–	Day 3	(Argentina) Diego Schwartzman	15	not played	N/A
Indian Wells Masters; Indian Wells, United States; ATP 1000; Hard, outdoor 4–17 October 2021
Indian Wells Masters; Indian Wells, United States; ATP 1000; Hard, outdoor 4–17 October 2021	–	1R	Bye			
Indian Wells Masters; Indian Wells, United States; ATP 1000; Hard, outdoor 4–17 October 2021	59 / 304	2R	(United States) Mackenzie McDonald (WC)	57	Win	6–4, 6–2
Indian Wells Masters; Indian Wells, United States; ATP 1000; Hard, outdoor 4–17 October 2021	60 / 305	3R	(Serbia) Filip Krajinović (27)	34	Win	6–2, 7–6^{(7–1)}
Indian Wells Masters; Indian Wells, United States; ATP 1000; Hard, outdoor 4–17 October 2021	61 / 306	4R	(Bulgaria) Grigor Dimitrov (23)	28	Loss	6–4, 4–6, 3–6
Paris Masters; Paris, France; ATP 1000; Hard, indoor 1–7 November 2021
Paris Masters; Paris, France; ATP 1000; Hard, indoor 1–7 November 2021	–	1R	Bye			
Paris Masters; Paris, France; ATP 1000; Hard, indoor 1–7 November 2021	62 / 307	2R	Ilya Ivashka	46	Win	7–5, 6–4
Paris Masters; Paris, France; ATP 1000; Hard, indoor 1–7 November 2021	63 / 308	3R	(United States) Sebastian Korda	39	Win	4–6, 6–1, 6–3
Paris Masters; Paris, France; ATP 1000; Hard, indoor 1–7 November 2021	64 / 309	QF	(France) Hugo Gaston (Q)	103	Win	7–6^{(9–7)}, 6–4
Paris Masters; Paris, France; ATP 1000; Hard, indoor 1–7 November 2021	65 / 310	SF	(Germany) Alexander Zverev (4)	4	Win	6–2, 6–2
Paris Masters; Paris, France; ATP 1000; Hard, indoor 1–7 November 2021	66 / 311	F	(Serbia) Novak Djokovic (1)	1	Loss	6–4, 3–6, 3–6
ATP Finals; Turin, Italy; ATP Finals; Hard, indoor 15–22 November 2021
ATP Finals; Turin, Italy; ATP Finals; Hard, indoor 15–22 November 2021	67 / 312	RR	(Poland) Hubert Hurkacz (7)	9	Win	6–7^{(5–7)}, 6–3, 6–4
ATP Finals; Turin, Italy; ATP Finals; Hard, indoor 15–22 November 2021	68 / 313	RR	(Germany) Alexander Zverev (3)	3	Win	6–0, 6–7^{(3–7)}, 7–6^{(8–6)}
ATP Finals; Turin, Italy; ATP Finals; Hard, indoor 15–22 November 2021	69 / 314	RR	(Italy) Jannik Sinner (9)	11	Win	6–0, 6–7^{(5–7)}, 7–6^{(10–8)}
ATP Finals; Turin, Italy; ATP Finals; Hard, indoor 15–22 November 2021	70 / 315	SF	(Norway) Casper Ruud (8)	8	Win	6–4, 6–2
ATP Finals; Turin, Italy; ATP Finals; Hard, indoor 15–22 November 2021	71 / 316	F	(Germany) Alexander Zverev (3)	3	Loss	4–6, 4–6
Davis Cup Finals; Group stage Knockout stage Madrid, Spain; Davis Cup; Hard, indoor 25 November – 5 December 2021
Davis Cup Finals; Group stage Knockout stage Madrid, Spain; Davis Cup; Hard, indoor 25 November – 5 December 2021	72 / 317	RR	(Ecuador) Emilio Gómez	149	Win	6–0, 6–2
Davis Cup Finals; Group stage Knockout stage Madrid, Spain; Davis Cup; Hard, indoor 25 November – 5 December 2021	73 / 318	RR	(Spain) Pablo Carreño Busta	20	Win	6–2, 7–6^{(7–3)}
Davis Cup Finals; Group stage Knockout stage Madrid, Spain; Davis Cup; Hard, indoor 25 November – 5 December 2021	74 / 319	QF	(Sweden) Mikael Ymer	93	Win	6–4, 6–4
Davis Cup Finals; Group stage Knockout stage Madrid, Spain; Davis Cup; Hard, indoor 25 November – 5 December 2021	75 / 320	SF	(Germany) Jan-Lennard Struff	51	Win	6–4, 6–4
Davis Cup Finals; Group stage Knockout stage Madrid, Spain; Davis Cup; Hard, indoor 25 November – 5 December 2021	76 / 321	W	(Croatia) Marin Čilić	30	Win	7–6^{(9–7)}, 6–2

=== Doubles matches ===
Tournament	Match	Round	Opponents (seed or key)	Ranks	Result	Score
Madrid Open; Madrid, Spain; ATP 1000; Clay, outdoor 3–9 May 2021; Partner: (Brazil) Marcelo Demoliner
Madrid Open; Madrid, Spain; ATP 1000; Clay, outdoor 3–9 May 2021; Partner: (Brazil) Marcelo Demoliner	1 / 29	1R	(United Kingdom) Dan Evans / (United Kingdom) Neal Skupski	52 / 19	Win	6–3, 7–6^{(7–4)}
Madrid Open; Madrid, Spain; ATP 1000; Clay, outdoor 3–9 May 2021; Partner: (Brazil) Marcelo Demoliner	2 / 30	2R	(Netherlands) Wesley Koolhof / (Poland) Łukasz Kubot (7)	17 / 10	Loss	5–7, 7–6^{(7–4)}. [3–10]
Italian Open; Rome, Italy; ATP 1000; Clay, outdoor 9–16 May 2021; Partner: (Brazil) Marcelo Demoliner
Italian Open; Rome, Italy; ATP 1000; Clay, outdoor 9–16 May 2021; Partner: (Brazil) Marcelo Demoliner	3 / 31	1R	(United Kingdom) Jamie Murray / (Brazil) Bruno Soares (6)	23 / 8	Win	3–6, 7–6^{(7–5)}, [10–4]
Italian Open; Rome, Italy; ATP 1000; Clay, outdoor 9–16 May 2021; Partner: (Brazil) Marcelo Demoliner	4 / 32	2R	(France) Adrian Mannarino / (France) Benoît Paire	190 / 88	Loss	3–6, 6–7^{(2–7)}
Summer Olympics; Tokyo, Japan; Olympics; Hard, outdoor 24 July – 1 August 2024; Partner: (Russia) Aslan Karatsev
Summer Olympics; Tokyo, Japan; Olympics; Hard, outdoor 24 July – 1 August 2024; Partner: (Russia) Aslan Karatsev	5 / 33	1R	(Slovakia) Lukáš Klein / (Slovakia) Filip Polášek	263 / 11	Loss	5–7, 4–6

== Schedule ==
=== Singles schedule ===
Date	Tournament	Location	Tier	Surface	Prev. result	Prev. points	New points	Result
1 February 2021– 7 February 2021	ATP Cup	Melbourne (AUS)	ATP Cup	Hard	SF	255	500	Champion (defeated Italy, 2–0)
8 February 2021– 21 February 2021	Australian Open	Melbourne (AUS)	Grand Slam	Hard	R16	180	1200	Final (lost to (Serbia) Novak Djokovic, 5–7, 2–6, 2–6)
1 March 2021– 7 March 2021	Rotterdam Open	Rotterdam (NED)	500 series	Hard (i)	R32	0	0	First round (lost to (Serbia) Dušan Lajović, 6–7^{(4–7)}, 4–6)
8 March 2021– 14 March 2021	Open 13	Marseille (FRA)	250 series	Hard (i)	QF	45	250	Champion (defeated (France) Pierre-Hugues Herbert, 6–4, 6–7^{(4–7)}, 6–4)
22 March 2021– 4 April 2021	Miami Open	Miami (USA)	Masters 1000	Hard	NH	45 (Note: Points carried over due to the Best of 24-month ranking being extended through and including the week of 1 March 2021.)	180	Quarterfinals (lost to (Spain) Roberto Bautista Agut, 4–6, 2–6)
12 April 2021– 18 April 2021	Monte Carlo Masters	Monte Carlo (MON)	Masters 1000	Clay	SF	180	0 (180)	Withdrew
19 April 2021– 25 April 2021	Barcelona Open	Barcelona (ESP)	500 Series	Clay	F	150	0 (150)	Withdrew
3 May 2021– 9 May 2021	Madrid Open	Madrid (ESP)	Masters 1000	Clay	R64	5	90	Third round (lost to (Chile) Cristian Garín, 4–6, 7–6^{(7–2)}, 1–6)
10 May 2021– 16 May 2021	Italian Open	Rome (ITA)	Masters 1000	Clay	R64	10	10	Second round (lost to (Russia) Aslan Karatsev, 2–6, 4–6)
31 May 2021– 13 June 2021	French Open	Paris (FRA)	Grand Slam	Clay	R128	5	360	Quarterfinals (lost to (Greece) Stefanos Tsitsipas, 3–6, 6–7^{(3–7)}, 5–7)
14 June 2021– 20 June 2021	Halle Open	Halle (GER)	500 Series	Grass	N/A	N/A	0	First round (lost to (Germany) Jan-Lennard Struff, 6–7^{(6–8)}, 3–6)
14 June 2021– 20 June 2021	Queen's Club	London (GBR)	500 Series	Grass	SF	90	0 (90)	Withdrew
21 June 2021– 26 June 2021	Mallorca Championships	Mallorca (ESP)	250 Series	Grass	N/A	N/A	250	Champion (defeated (United States) Sam Querrey, 6–4, 6–2)
28 June 2021– 11 July 2021	Wimbledon	London (GBR)	Grand Slam	Grass	R32	45	180	Fourth round (lost to (Poland) Hubert Hurkacz, 6–2, 6–7^{(2–7)}, 6–3, 3–6, 3–6)
24 July 2021– 1 August 2021	Summer Olympics	Tokyo (JPN)	Olympic Games	Hard	NH	N/A	N/A	Quarterfinals (lost to (Spain) Pablo Carreño Busta, 2–6, 6–7^{(5–7)})
31 July 2021– 8 August 2021	Citi Open	Washington (USA)	500 Series	Hard	F	150	0 (150)	Withdrew
9 August 2021– 15 August 2021	Canadian Open	Toronto (CAN)	Masters 1000	Hard	NH	300	1000	Champion (defeated (United States) Reilly Opelka, 6–4, 6–3)
16 August 2021– 22 August 2021	Cincinnati Masters	Cincinnati (USA)	Masters 1000	Hard	QF	180	360	Semifinals (lost to (Russia) Andrey Rublev, 6–2, 3–6, 3–6)
30 August 2021– 12 September 2021	US Open	New York (USA)	Grand Slam	Hard	SF	720	2000	Champion (defeated (Serbia) Novak Djokovic, 6–4, 6–4, 6–4)
4 October 2021– 17 October 2021	Indian Wells Masters	Indian Wells (USA)	Masters 1000	Hard	NH	23	90	Fourth round (lost to (Bulgaria) Grigor Dimitrov, 6–4, 4–6, 3–6)
1 November 2021– 7 November 2021	Paris Masters	Paris (FRA)	Masters 1000	Hard (i)	W	1000	600	Final (lost to (Serbia) Novak Djokovic, 6–4, 3–6, 3–6)
15 November 2021– 21 November 2021	ATP Finals	Turin (ITA)	ATP Finals	Hard (i)	W	1500	1000	Final (lost to (Germany) Alexander Zverev, 4–6, 4–6)
25 November 2021– 5 December 2021	Davis Cup Finals Knockout stage	Madrid (ESP)	Davis Cup	Hard (i)	W	N/A	N/A	Winner ( Russia defeated Croatia, 2–0)
Total year-end points						8470	8640	▲170 difference

== Yearly Records ==
=== Earnings ===
- **Bold** font denotes tournament win

**Singles**
Event	Prize money	Year-to-date
**ATP Cup**	**$576,725**	$8,276,287
Australian Open	A$1,500,000	$8,276,287
Rotterdam Open	€13,800	$8,276,287
**Open 13**	**€52,500**	$8,276,287
Miami Open	$61,000	$8,276,287
Madrid Open	€36,400	$8,276,287
Italian Open	€18,000	$8,276,287
French Open	€255,000	$8,276,287
Halle Open	€14,650	$8,276,287
**Mallorca Championships**	**€70,620**	$8,276,287
Wimbledon	£181,000	$8,276,287
**Canadian Open**	**$370,290**	$8,276,287
Cincinnati Masters	$285,000	$8,276,287
**US Open**	**$2,500,000**	$8,276,287
Indian Wells Masters	$92,000	$8,276,287
Paris Masters	€433,045	$8,276,287
ATP Finals	$1,222,000	$8,276,287
Bonus Pool	$810,000	$8,276,287
		$8,276,287
**Doubles**
Event	Prize money	Year-to-date
Madrid Open	€6,905	$14,987
Italian Open	€5,500	$14,987
		$14,987
**Total**
		**$8,291,274**

Figures in United States dollars (USD) unless noted.

- source：2021 Singles Activity
- source：2021 Doubles Activity

== See also ==
- 2021 ATP Tour
- 2021 Rafael Nadal tennis season
- 2021 Novak Djokovic tennis season
