= 2021 Novak Djokovic tennis season =

- Full name: Novak Djokovic
- Country: Serbia
- Calendar prize money: $9,100,547 (singles & doubles)

Singles
- Season record: 55–7
- Calendar titles: 5
- Year-end ranking: No. 1
- Ranking change from previous year: Steady

Grand Slam & significant results
- Australian Open: W
- French Open: W
- Wimbledon: W
- US Open: F
- Other tournaments
- Tour Finals: SF
- Olympic Games: 4th

Doubles
- Season record: 6–4
- Current ranking: No. 255
- Ranking change from previous year: ▼97

Mixed doubles
- Season record: 2–1

Grand Slam mixed doubles results
- Olympic Games: 4th place

The 2021 Novak Djokovic tennis season is considered one of Djokovic's best. It saw him become the second man in tennis history to achieve the Surface Slam (winning majors on the three different surfaces of clay, grass and hard court in the same calendar year) following Rafael Nadal in 2010, and repeat his feat from 2015 of reaching all four major finals in a season. He won five tournaments, three of them majors: the Australian Open, the French Open, and the Wimbledon Championships. Djokovic reached the final of the US Open in an attempt to achieve the Grand Slam, but finished runner-up to Daniil Medvedev. He also won the Paris Masters and Belgrade Open, and reached his first final in a doubles tournament since 2010 at the Mallorca Open.

During this season, Djokovic:

- Surpassed Roger Federer's record number of 310 weeks spent with the ATP No. 1 singles ranking to 353.
- Surpassed Pete Sampras' record of six year-end No. 1 ranking finishes to seven.
- Surpassed his record (joint with Nadal) of 36 Masters 1000 titles to 37.
- Surpassed Federer's record of 224 wins over top 10 players to 229.
- Tied Federer and Nadal's all-time record total of 20 men's singles major titles.
- Tied Federer's all-time record of 31 major finals reached.
- Tied Federer's all-time record of 13 Olympic singles victories.

== Yearly summary ==
=== ATP Cup ===
Novak Djokovic began his official season by taking part in Serbia's national team in the ATP Cup. Looking to defend the past year's title, Serbia met Canada and Germany in Group A. Djokovic defeated Denis Shapovalov in straight sets, and teamed with Filip Krajinović to defeat Shapovalov and Milos Raonic in doubles, to help Serbia defeat Canada. However, Serbia's tournament ended with a loss against Germany. Djokovic defeated Alexander Zverev in three sets, but lost in doubles with Nikola Ćaćić against Zverev and Jan-Lennard Struff.

=== Australian Open ===
Djokovic started the Australian open with a straight set win against Jérémy Chardy and a four-set win against Frances Tiafoe. Djokovic won a five-set thriller against Taylor Fritz in the third round, despite an injury scare. He continued his dominance at the Australian Open by overwhelming Milos Raonic and Zverev in four sets. He defeated Russians Aslan Karatsev and Daniil Medvedev in straight sets in the semi-finals and finals, to win the Australian Open again. The victory marked his record-extending ninth men's singles title at the tournament, and also his 18th major title overall.

=== Miami Open ===
Djokovic withdrew from the 2021 Miami Open, citing a desire to rest after the Australian Open and spend more time with family. He also wanted to prepare for the upcoming clay court season.

=== Spring clay court season ===
==== Monte-Carlo Masters ====
After a straight sets win over Sinner, Djokovic was upset by Dan Evans in the third round, marking his first singles loss of the season.

==== Serbia Open ====
After straight-sets wins over Kwon Soon-woo and compatriot Miomir Kecmanović, Djokovic lost in the semifinals to Karatsev in three tight sets.

==== Italian Open ====
Djokovic started the defense of his Italian Open title with straight sets wins over Fritz and Alejandro Davidovich Fokina. After this, he had an early scare, down a set and a break in a rainy match against Stefanos Tsitsipas that was postponed. The next day, he made a comeback and won. The same day, he also won his semifinal against Lorenzo Sonego in three sets. Djokovic then lost to Rafael Nadal in the final in three sets.

==== Serbia Open Part 2 ====
Djokovic started the Serbia Open part 2 with straight sets wins over Mats Moraing and Federico Coria. After reaching the final with a three set win over Andrej Martin, Djokovic won his 83rd title, at home, defeating Alex Molčan in straight sets.

==== French Open ====
Djokovic began with straight set wins against Tennys Sandgren, Pablo Cuevas, and Ričardas Berankis in the first three rounds. In the fourth round, Lorenzo Musetti led by two sets to love, but Djokovic then won all but one game afterwards; Musetti retired in the fifth set. After a four set win in the quarterfinals against Matteo Berrettini, Djokovic shockingly defeated Nadal in the semifinals in four brutal sets, only the second time he had beaten Nadal at Roland Garros, and only the third time Nadal lost at the event. Djokovic then defeated Stefanos Tsitsipas in the final in five sets, after losing the first two. It was his 19th major title, and he completed a double Career Grand Slam. He became the first player in the Open Era to win a Major after coming back from a two-set deficit in two separate matches in the same tournament (in the fourth round and the final). He also became the first player to beat Nadal on the way to winning Roland Garros.

=== Grass court season ===
==== Mallorca Open ====
Djokovic's grass-court season began at the Mallorca Championships, where he competed in doubles alongside Carlos Gómez-Herrera. The team advanced to the final, but they withdrew before the match due to an injury to Gómez-Herrera.

==== Wimbledon ====
Djokovic entered Wimbledon as the defending champion from 2019 and the favorite for the title. He won a four-set first round over British wildcard Jack Draper. He reached the final with five straight set wins, defeating Denis Kudla, former runner-up Kevin Anderson, Márton Fucsovics, Chilean seed Cristian Garín, and Denis Shapovalov. He then recovered from a one-set deficit in the final against Matteo Berrettini to claim his sixth Wimbledon title and 20th men's singles major title overall, equaling Roger Federer and Nadal's all-time record.

=== Late hard court season ===
==== Tokyo Olympics ====
Djokovic opened his summer hard court season at the Tokyo Olympics, where he sought to improve on his bronze medal result from Beijing 2008 and pursue a potential calendar-year and career Golden Slam. He won his first four rounds in straight sets, against Hugo Dellien Struff, Davidovich Fokina and hometown player Kei Nishikori, to reach the semifinals, where he lost to Alexander Zverev in 3 sets despite being a set and a break up. He then lost his bronze medal match to Pablo Carreño Busta in 3 tight sets. He also participated in the mixed doubles alongside Nina Stojanović, where the pair won their first two matches in straight sets but lost in the semifinals and withdrew from the bronze medal match. Djokovic thus left the Olympics without any medals.

==== US Open ====
Djokovic entered the tournament in contention for the Grand Slam, a feat in men's singles tennis achieved only by Don Budge in 1938 and Rod Laver in 1962 and 1969. Djokovic won in four sets against Holger Rune and against Tallon Griekspoor in straight sets. He then proceeded to lose the first set and win the subsequent three in each of his next three matches, against Nishikori, Jenson Brooksby, and Berrettini. He then defeated Zverev in five sets in the semifinals. Djokovic then lost in the final to Medvedev in straight sets, ending his Grand Slam bid.

=== European indoor hard court season ===
==== Paris Masters ====
Djokovic played in men's doubles, partnering Krajinovic. They won in the first round, but lost the next round in straight sets. In singles, Djokovic defeated Márton Fucsovics in 3 sets, and advanced to the quarter-finals after a walkover by Gaël Monfils in the Round of 16. He won the semifinals against Hubert Hurkacz in three sets in the semifinals, securing the year-end No. 1 ranking for a record seventh time. In the final, he avenged his US Open final loss by beating Medvedev in three sets, winning a record-extending sixth Paris Masters title, and a record 37th Masters title overall.

==== ATP Finals ====
Djokovic won all of his round-robin matches (against Casper Ruud, Andrey Rublev, and Cameron Norrie) in straight sets to advance to the semifinals, but then lost a 3-setter to Alexander Zverev.

== All matches ==
This table lists all the matches of Djokovic in 2021, including walkovers (W/O)

Key
W	F	SF	QF	#R	RR	Q#	P#	DNQ	A	Z#	PO	G	S	B	NMS	NTI	P	NH

(W) winner; (F) finalist; (SF) semifinalist; (QF) quarterfinalist; (#R) rounds 4, 3, 2, 1; (RR) round-robin stage; (Q#) qualification round; (P#) preliminary round; (DNQ) did not qualify; (A) absent; (Z#) Davis/Fed Cup Zonal Group (with number indication) or (PO) play-off; (G) gold, (S) silver or (B) bronze Olympic/Paralympic medal; (NMS) not a Masters tournament; (NTI) not a Tier I tournament; (P) postponed; (NH) not held; (SR) strike rate (events won / competed); (W–L) win–loss record.
To avoid confusion and double counting, these charts are updated at the conclusion of a tournament or when the player's participation has ended.

=== Singles matches ===
Tournament	Match	Round	Opponent (seed or key)	Rank	Result	Score
ATP Cup; Melbourne, Australia; ATP Cup; Hard, outdoor 2–7 February 2021
ATP Cup; Melbourne, Australia; ATP Cup; Hard, outdoor 2–7 February 2021	1 / 1127	RR	(Canada) Denis Shapovalov	12	Win	7–5, 7–5
ATP Cup; Melbourne, Australia; ATP Cup; Hard, outdoor 2–7 February 2021	2 / 1128	RR	(Germany) Alexander Zverev	7	Win	6–7^{(3–7)}, 6–2, 7–5
Australian Open; Melbourne, Australia; Grand Slam tournament Hard, outdoor 8–21 February 2021
Australian Open; Melbourne, Australia; Grand Slam tournament Hard, outdoor 8–21 February 2021	3 / 1129	1R	(France) Jérémy Chardy	61	Win	6–3, 6–1, 6–2
Australian Open; Melbourne, Australia; Grand Slam tournament Hard, outdoor 8–21 February 2021	4 / 1130	2R	(United States) Frances Tiafoe	64	Win	6–3, 6–7^{(3–7)}, 7–6^{(7–2)}, 6–3
Australian Open; Melbourne, Australia; Grand Slam tournament Hard, outdoor 8–21 February 2021	5 / 1131	3R	(United States) Taylor Fritz (27)	31	Win	7–6^{(7–1)}, 6–4, 3–6, 4–6, 6–2
Australian Open; Melbourne, Australia; Grand Slam tournament Hard, outdoor 8–21 February 2021	6 / 1132	4R	(Canada) Milos Raonic (14)	14	Win	7–6^{(7–4)}, 4–6, 6–1, 6–4
Australian Open; Melbourne, Australia; Grand Slam tournament Hard, outdoor 8–21 February 2021	7 / 1133	QF	(Germany) Alexander Zverev (6)	7	Win	6–7^{(6–8)}, 6–2, 6–4, 7–6^{(8–6)}
Australian Open; Melbourne, Australia; Grand Slam tournament Hard, outdoor 8–21 February 2021	8 / 1134	SF	(Russia) Aslan Karatsev (Q)	114	Win	6–3, 6–4, 6–2
Australian Open; Melbourne, Australia; Grand Slam tournament Hard, outdoor 8–21 February 2021	9 / 1135	W	(Russia) Daniil Medvedev (4)	4	Win (1)	7–5, 6–2, 6–2
Monte-Carlo Masters; Monte Carlo, Monaco; ATP 1000; Clay, outdoor 12–18 April 2021
Monte-Carlo Masters; Monte Carlo, Monaco; ATP 1000; Clay, outdoor 12–18 April 2021	–	1R	Bye			
Monte-Carlo Masters; Monte Carlo, Monaco; ATP 1000; Clay, outdoor 12–18 April 2021	10 / 1136	2R	(Italy) Jannik Sinner	22	Win	6–4, 6–2
Monte-Carlo Masters; Monte Carlo, Monaco; ATP 1000; Clay, outdoor 12–18 April 2021	11 / 1137	3R	(United Kingdom) Dan Evans	33	Loss	4–6, 5–7
Serbia Open; Belgrade, Serbia; ATP 250; Clay, outdoor 19–25 April 2021
Serbia Open; Belgrade, Serbia; ATP 250; Clay, outdoor 19–25 April 2021	–	1R	Bye			
Serbia Open; Belgrade, Serbia; ATP 250; Clay, outdoor 19–25 April 2021	12 / 1138	2R	(South Korea) Kwon Soon-woo	85	Win	6–1, 6–3
Serbia Open; Belgrade, Serbia; ATP 250; Clay, outdoor 19–25 April 2021	13 / 1139	QF	(Serbia) Miomir Kecmanović (8)	47	Win	6–1, 6–3
Serbia Open; Belgrade, Serbia; ATP 250; Clay, outdoor 19–25 April 2021	14 / 1140	SF	(Russia) Aslan Karatsev (3)	28	Loss	5–7, 6–4, 4–6
Italian Open; Rome, Italy; ATP 1000; Clay, outdoor 9–16 May 2021
Italian Open; Rome, Italy; ATP 1000; Clay, outdoor 9–16 May 2021	–	1R	Bye			
Italian Open; Rome, Italy; ATP 1000; Clay, outdoor 9–16 May 2021	15 / 1141	2R	(United States) Taylor Fritz	31	Win	6–3, 7–6^{(7–5)}
Italian Open; Rome, Italy; ATP 1000; Clay, outdoor 9–16 May 2021	16 / 1142	3R	(Spain) Alejandro Davidovich Fokina (Q)	48	Win	6–2, 6–1
Italian Open; Rome, Italy; ATP 1000; Clay, outdoor 9–16 May 2021	17 / 1143	QF	(Greece) Stefanos Tsitsipas (5)	5	Win	4–6, 7–5, 7–5
Italian Open; Rome, Italy; ATP 1000; Clay, outdoor 9–16 May 2021	18 / 1144	SF	(Italy) Lorenzo Sonego	28	Win	6–3, 6–7^{(5–7)}, 6–2
Italian Open; Rome, Italy; ATP 1000; Clay, outdoor 9–16 May 2021	19 / 1145	F	(Spain) Rafael Nadal (2)	3	Loss	5–7, 6–1, 3–6
Belgrade Open; Belgrade, Serbia; ATP 250; Clay, outdoor 24–30 May 2021
Belgrade Open; Belgrade, Serbia; ATP 250; Clay, outdoor 24–30 May 2021	–	1R	Bye			
Belgrade Open; Belgrade, Serbia; ATP 250; Clay, outdoor 24–30 May 2021	20 / 1146	2R	(Germany) Mats Moraing (LL)	253	Win	6–2, 7–6^{(7–4)}
Belgrade Open; Belgrade, Serbia; ATP 250; Clay, outdoor 24–30 May 2021	21 / 1147	QF	(Argentina) Federico Coria (Alt)	96	Win	6–1, 6–0
Belgrade Open; Belgrade, Serbia; ATP 250; Clay, outdoor 24–30 May 2021	22 / 1148	SF	(Slovakia) Andrej Martin (Q)	119	Win	6–1, 4–6, 6–0
Belgrade Open; Belgrade, Serbia; ATP 250; Clay, outdoor 24–30 May 2021	23 / 1149	W	(Slovakia) Alex Molčan (Q)	255	Win (2)	6–4, 6–3
French Open; Paris, France; Grand Slam tournament Clay, outdoor 30 May – 13 June 2021
French Open; Paris, France; Grand Slam tournament Clay, outdoor 30 May – 13 June 2021	24 / 1150	1R	(United States) Tennys Sandgren	66	Win	6–2, 6–4, 6–2
French Open; Paris, France; Grand Slam tournament Clay, outdoor 30 May – 13 June 2021	25 / 1151	2R	(Uruguay) Pablo Cuevas	92	Win	6–3, 6–2, 6–4
French Open; Paris, France; Grand Slam tournament Clay, outdoor 30 May – 13 June 2021	26 / 1152	3R	(Lithuania) Ričardas Berankis	93	Win	6–1, 6–4, 6–1
French Open; Paris, France; Grand Slam tournament Clay, outdoor 30 May – 13 June 2021	27 / 1153	4R	(Italy) Lorenzo Musetti	76	Win	6–7^{(7–9)}, 6–7^{(2–7)}, 6–1, 6–0, 4–0 ret.
French Open; Paris, France; Grand Slam tournament Clay, outdoor 30 May – 13 June 2021	28 / 1154	QF	(Italy) Matteo Berrettini (9)	9	Win	6–3, 6–2, 6–7^{(5–7)}, 7–5
French Open; Paris, France; Grand Slam tournament Clay, outdoor 30 May – 13 June 2021	29 / 1155	SF	(Spain) Rafael Nadal (3)	3	Win	3–6, 6–3, 7–6^{(7–4)}, 6–2
French Open; Paris, France; Grand Slam tournament Clay, outdoor 30 May – 13 June 2021	30 / 1156	W	(Greece) Stefanos Tsitsipas (5)	5	Win (3)	6–7^{(6–8)}, 2–6, 6–3, 6–2, 6–4
Wimbledon Championships; London, United Kingdom; Grand Slam tournament Grass, outdoor 28 June – 11 July 2021
Wimbledon Championships; London, United Kingdom; Grand Slam tournament Grass, outdoor 28 June – 11 July 2021	31 / 1157	1R	(United Kingdom) Jack Draper (WC)	253	Win	4–6, 6–1, 6–2, 6–2
Wimbledon Championships; London, United Kingdom; Grand Slam tournament Grass, outdoor 28 June – 11 July 2021	32 / 1158	2R	(South Africa) Kevin Anderson	102	Win	6–3, 6–3, 6–3
Wimbledon Championships; London, United Kingdom; Grand Slam tournament Grass, outdoor 28 June – 11 July 2021	33 / 1159	3R	(United States) Denis Kudla (Q)	114	Win	6–4, 6–3, 7–6^{(9–7)}
Wimbledon Championships; London, United Kingdom; Grand Slam tournament Grass, outdoor 28 June – 11 July 2021	34 / 1160	4R	(Chile) Cristian Garín (17)	20	Win	6–2, 6–4, 6–2
Wimbledon Championships; London, United Kingdom; Grand Slam tournament Grass, outdoor 28 June – 11 July 2021	35 / 1161	QF	(Hungary) Márton Fucsovics	48	Win	6–3, 6–4, 6–4
Wimbledon Championships; London, United Kingdom; Grand Slam tournament Grass, outdoor 28 June – 11 July 2021	36 / 1162	SF	(Canada) Denis Shapovalov (10)	12	Win	7–6^{(7–3)}, 7–5, 7–5
Wimbledon Championships; London, United Kingdom; Grand Slam tournament Grass, outdoor 28 June – 11 July 2021	37 / 1163	W	(Italy) Matteo Berrettini (7)	9	Win (4)	6–7^{(4–7)}, 6–4, 6–4, 6–3
Summer Olympics; Tokyo, Japan; Olympics; Hard, outdoor 24 July – 1 August 2021
Summer Olympics; Tokyo, Japan; Olympics; Hard, outdoor 24 July – 1 August 2021	38 / 1164	1R	(Bolivia) Hugo Dellien	139	Win	6–2, 6–2
Summer Olympics; Tokyo, Japan; Olympics; Hard, outdoor 24 July – 1 August 2021	39 / 1165	2R	(Germany) Jan-Lennard Struff	48	Win	6–4, 6–3
Summer Olympics; Tokyo, Japan; Olympics; Hard, outdoor 24 July – 1 August 2021	40 / 1166	3R	(Spain) Alejandro Davidovich Fokina (16)	34	Win	6–3, 6–1
Summer Olympics; Tokyo, Japan; Olympics; Hard, outdoor 24 July – 1 August 2021	41 / 1167	QF	(Japan) Kei Nishikori	69	Win	6–2, 6–0
Summer Olympics; Tokyo, Japan; Olympics; Hard, outdoor 24 July – 1 August 2021	42 / 1168	SF	(Germany) Alexander Zverev (4)	5	Loss	6–1, 3–6, 1–6
Summer Olympics; Tokyo, Japan; Olympics; Hard, outdoor 24 July – 1 August 2021	43 / 1169	SF-B	(Spain) Pablo Carreño Busta (6)	11	Loss	4–6, 7–6^{(8–6)}, 3–6
US Open; New York City, United States; Grand Slam tournament Hard, outdoor 30 August – 12 September 2021
US Open; New York City, United States; Grand Slam tournament Hard, outdoor 30 August – 12 September 2021	44 / 1170	1R	(Denmark) Holger Rune (Q)	145	Win	6–1, 6–7^{(5–7)}, 6–2, 6–1
US Open; New York City, United States; Grand Slam tournament Hard, outdoor 30 August – 12 September 2021	45 / 1171	2R	(Netherlands) Tallon Griekspoor	121	Win	6–2, 6–3, 6–2
US Open; New York City, United States; Grand Slam tournament Hard, outdoor 30 August – 12 September 2021	46 / 1172	3R	(Japan) Kei Nishikori	56	Win	6–7^{(4–7)}, 6–3, 6–3, 6–2
US Open; New York City, United States; Grand Slam tournament Hard, outdoor 30 August – 12 September 2021	47 / 1173	4R	(United States) Jenson Brooksby (WC)	99	Win	1–6, 6–3, 6–2, 6–2
US Open; New York City, United States; Grand Slam tournament Hard, outdoor 30 August – 12 September 2021	48 / 1174	QF	(Italy) Matteo Berrettini (6)	8	Win	5–7, 6–2, 6–2, 6–3
US Open; New York City, United States; Grand Slam tournament Hard, outdoor 30 August – 12 September 2021	49 / 1175	SF	(Germany) Alexander Zverev (4)	4	Win	4–6, 6–2, 6–4, 4–6, 6–2
US Open; New York City, United States; Grand Slam tournament Hard, outdoor 30 August – 12 September 2021	50 / 1176	F	(Russia) Daniil Medvedev (2)	2	Loss	4–6, 4–6, 4–6
Paris Masters; Paris, France; ATP 1000; Hard, indoor 1–7 November 2021
Paris Masters; Paris, France; ATP 1000; Hard, indoor 1–7 November 2021	–	1R	Bye			
Paris Masters; Paris, France; ATP 1000; Hard, indoor 1–7 November 2021	51 / 1177	2R	(Hungary) Márton Fucsovics	40	Win	6–2, 4–6, 6–3
Paris Masters; Paris, France; ATP 1000; Hard, indoor 1–7 November 2021	–	3R	(France) Gaël Monfils (15)	22	Walkover	N/A
Paris Masters; Paris, France; ATP 1000; Hard, indoor 1–7 November 2021	52 / 1178	QF	(United States) Taylor Fritz	26	Win	6–4, 6–3
Paris Masters; Paris, France; ATP 1000; Hard, indoor 1–7 November 2021	53 / 1179	SF	(Poland) Hubert Hurkacz (7)	10	Win	3–6, 6–0, 7–6^{(7–5)}
Paris Masters; Paris, France; ATP 1000; Hard, indoor 1–7 November 2021	54 / 1180	W	(Russia) Daniil Medvedev (2)	2	Win (5)	4–6, 6–3, 6–3
ATP Finals; Turin, Italy; ATP Finals; Hard, indoor 14–21 November 2021
ATP Finals; Turin, Italy; ATP Finals; Hard, indoor 14–21 November 2021	55 / 1181	RR	(Norway) Casper Ruud (8)	8	Win	7–6^{(7–4)}, 6–2
ATP Finals; Turin, Italy; ATP Finals; Hard, indoor 14–21 November 2021	56 / 1182	RR	(Russia) Andrey Rublev (5)	5	Win	6–3, 6–2
ATP Finals; Turin, Italy; ATP Finals; Hard, indoor 14–21 November 2021	57 / 1183	RR	(United Kingdom) Cameron Norrie (Alt)	12	Win	6–2, 6–1
ATP Finals; Turin, Italy; ATP Finals; Hard, indoor 14–21 November 2021	58 / 1184	SF	(Germany) Alexander Zverev (3)	3	Loss	6–7^{(4–7)}, 6–4, 3–6
Davis Cup Finals; Group stage Innsbruck, Austria; Davis Cup; Hard, indoor 26–28 November 2021
Davis Cup Finals; Group stage Innsbruck, Austria; Davis Cup; Hard, indoor 26–28 November 2021	59 / 1185	RR	(Austria) Dennis Novak	118	Win	6–3, 6–2
Davis Cup Finals; Group stage Innsbruck, Austria; Davis Cup; Hard, indoor 26–28 November 2021	60 / 1186	RR	(Germany) Jan-Lennard Struff	51	Win	6–2, 6–4
Davis Cup Finals; Knockout stage Madrid, Spain; Davis Cup; Hard, indoor 1–5 December 2021
Davis Cup Finals; Knockout stage Madrid, Spain; Davis Cup; Hard, indoor 1–5 December 2021	61 / 1187	QF	(Kazakhstan) Alexander Bublik	36	Win	6–3, 6–4
Davis Cup Finals; Knockout stage Madrid, Spain; Davis Cup; Hard, indoor 1–5 December 2021	62 / 1188	SF	(Croatia) Marin Čilić	30	Win	6–4, 6–2

=== Doubles matches ===
Tournament	Match	Round	Opponents (seed or key)	Ranks	Result	Score
ATP Cup; Melbourne, Australia; ATP Cup; Hard, outdoor 2–7 February 2021; Partner: (Serbia) Filip Krajinović (vs. Canada) (Serbia) Nikola Ćaćić (vs. Germany)
ATP Cup; Melbourne, Australia; ATP Cup; Hard, outdoor 2–7 February 2021; Partner: (Serbia) Filip Krajinović (vs. Canada) (Serbia) Nikola Ćaćić (vs. Germany)	1 / 128	RR	(Canada) Milos Raonic / (Canada) Denis Shapovalov	385 / 49	Win	7–5, 7–6^{(7–4)}
ATP Cup; Melbourne, Australia; ATP Cup; Hard, outdoor 2–7 February 2021; Partner: (Serbia) Filip Krajinović (vs. Canada) (Serbia) Nikola Ćaćić (vs. Germany)	2 / 129	RR	(Germany) Jan-Lennard Struff / (Germany) Alexander Zverev	53 / 180	Loss	6–7^{(4–7)}, 7–5, [7–10]
Mallorca Championships; Santa Ponsa, Spain; ATP 250; Grass, outdoor 21–27 June 2021; Partner: (Spain) Carlos Gómez-Herrera
Mallorca Championships; Santa Ponsa, Spain; ATP 250; Grass, outdoor 21–27 June 2021; Partner: (Spain) Carlos Gómez-Herrera	3 / 130	1R	(Bosnia and Herzegovina) Tomislav Brkić / (Serbia) Nikola Ćaćić	56 / 45	Win	5–7, 6–4, [13–11]
Mallorca Championships; Santa Ponsa, Spain; ATP 250; Grass, outdoor 21–27 June 2021; Partner: (Spain) Carlos Gómez-Herrera	4 / 131	QF	(Spain) Marcel Granollers / (Argentina) Horacio Zeballos (1)	10 / 7	Win	4–6, 7–6^{(7–3)}, [10–8]
Mallorca Championships; Santa Ponsa, Spain; ATP 250; Grass, outdoor 21–27 June 2021; Partner: (Spain) Carlos Gómez-Herrera	5 / 132	SF	(Austria) Oliver Marach / (Pakistan) Aisam-ul-Haq Qureshi (3)	30 / 55	Win	6–3, 7–6^{(7–4)}
Mallorca Championships; Santa Ponsa, Spain; ATP 250; Grass, outdoor 21–27 June 2021; Partner: (Spain) Carlos Gómez-Herrera	–	F	(Italy) Simone Bolelli / (Argentina) Máximo González (4)	54 / 39	Withdrew	N/A
Paris Masters; Paris, France; ATP 1000; Hard, indoor 1–7 November 2021; Partner: (Serbia) Filip Krajinović
Paris Masters; Paris, France; ATP 1000; Hard, indoor 1–7 November 2021; Partner: (Serbia) Filip Krajinović	6 / 133	1R	(Australia) Alex de Minaur / (Australia) Luke Saville	133 / 27	Win	4–6, 6–4, [10–7]
Paris Masters; Paris, France; ATP 1000; Hard, indoor 1–7 November 2021; Partner: (Serbia) Filip Krajinović	7 / 134	2R	(Australia) John Peers / (Slovakia) Filip Polášek (6)	14 / 9	Loss	6–7^{(2–7)}, 4–6
Davis Cup Finals; Innsbruck, Austria; Davis Cup; Hard, indoor 26–28 November 2021; Partner: (Serbia) Nikola Ćaćić
Davis Cup Finals; Innsbruck, Austria; Davis Cup; Hard, indoor 26–28 November 2021; Partner: (Serbia) Nikola Ćaćić	8 / 135	RR	(Germany) Kevin Krawietz / (Germany) Tim Pütz	14 / 18	Loss	6–7^{(5–7)}, 6–3, 6–7^{(5–7)}
Davis Cup Finals; Knockout stage Madrid, Spain; Davis Cup; Hard, indoor 1–5 December 2021; Partner: (Serbia) Nikola Ćaćić (vs. Kazakhstan); (Serbia) Filip Krajinović (vs. Croatia)
Davis Cup Finals; Knockout stage Madrid, Spain; Davis Cup; Hard, indoor 1–5 December 2021; Partner: (Serbia) Nikola Ćaćić (vs. Kazakhstan); (Serbia) Filip Krajinović (vs. Croatia)	9 / 136	RR	(Kazakhstan) Andrey Golubev / (Kazakhstan) Aleksandr Nedovyesov	28 / 72	Win	6–2, 2–6, 6–3
Davis Cup Finals; Knockout stage Madrid, Spain; Davis Cup; Hard, indoor 1–5 December 2021; Partner: (Serbia) Nikola Ćaćić (vs. Kazakhstan); (Serbia) Filip Krajinović (vs. Croatia)	10 / 137	SF	(Croatia) Nikola Mektić / (Croatia) Mate Pavić	2 / 1	Loss	5–7, 1–6

=== Mixed doubles matches ===
Tournament	Match	Round	Opponents (seed or key)	Ranks	Result	Score
2020 Summer Olympics; Tokyo, Japan; Olympics; Hard, outdoor 28 July – 1 August 2021; Partner: (Serbia) Nina Stojanović
2020 Summer Olympics; Tokyo, Japan; Olympics; Hard, outdoor 28 July – 1 August 2021; Partner: (Serbia) Nina Stojanović	1 / 3	1R	(Brazil) Luisa Stefani / (Brazil) Marcelo Melo	23 / 18	Win	6–3, 6–4
2020 Summer Olympics; Tokyo, Japan; Olympics; Hard, outdoor 28 July – 1 August 2021; Partner: (Serbia) Nina Stojanović	2 / 4	QF	(Germany) Laura Siegemund / (Germany) Kevin Krawietz	34 / 15	Win	6–1, 6–2
2020 Summer Olympics; Tokyo, Japan; Olympics; Hard, outdoor 28 July – 1 August 2021; Partner: (Serbia) Nina Stojanović	3 / 5	SF	(Russia) Elena Vesnina / (Russia) Aslan Karatsev	56 / 203	Loss	6–7^{(4–7)}, 5–7
2020 Summer Olympics; Tokyo, Japan; Olympics; Hard, outdoor 28 July – 1 August 2021; Partner: (Serbia) Nina Stojanović	–	SF-B	(Australia) Ashleigh Barty / (Australia) John Peers	36 / 25	Withdrew	N/A

== Exhibition matches ==
=== Singles ===
Tournament	Match	Round	Opponent (seed or key)	Rank	Result	Score
A Day at the Drive; Adelaide, Australia Hard, outdoor 29 January 2021
A Day at the Drive; Adelaide, Australia Hard, outdoor 29 January 2021	1	–	(Italy) Jannik Sinner	36	Win	6–3

== Schedule ==
Per Novak Djokovic, this is his current 2021 schedule (subject to change). The ATP rankings are currently affected by the COVID-19 pandemic; they are on a Best of 24-month basis through the week of 15 March 2021. Until then, all the events are non-mandatory and players can use the best result from the same event in that 24-month span.

=== Singles schedule ===
Date	Tournament	Location	Tier	Surface	Prev. result	Prev. points	New points	Result
2 February 2021– 7 February 2021	ATP Cup	Melbourne (AUS)	ATP Cup	Hard	W	665	140 (665 (Note: Points carried over due to the Best of 24-month ranking being extended through and including the week of 1 March 2021.))	Round robin ( Serbia lost to Germany, 1–2)
8 February 2021– 21 February 2021	Australian Open	Melbourne (AUS)	Grand Slam	Hard	W	2000	2000	Champion (defeated Daniil Medvedev, 7–5, 6–2, 6–2)
15 March 2021– 21 March 2021	Dubai Open	Dubai (UAE)	500 Series	Hard	W	500	0 (500)	Withdrew
24 March 2021– 4 April 2021	Miami Open	Miami (USA)	Masters 1000	Hard	4R	90	0 (45 (Note: Points carried over due to the Best of 24-month ranking being used for events between 4 March – 5 August 2019, that were not played in 2020, but weighted at 50%.))	Withdrew
12 April 2021– 18 April 2021	Monte Carlo Masters	Monte Carlo (MON)	Masters 1000	Clay	QF	180	90	Third round (lost to Dan Evans, 4–6, 5–7)
19 April 2021– 25 April 2021	Serbia Open	Belgrade (SRB)	250 Series	Clay	NH	N/A	90	Semifinals (lost to Aslan Karatsev, 5–7, 6–4, 4–6)
3 May 2021– 9 May 2021	Madrid Open	Madrid (ESP)	Masters 1000	Clay	W	1000	0 (500)	Withdrew
9 May 2021– 16 May 2021	Italian Open	Rome (ITA)	Masters 1000	Clay	W	1000	600	Final (lost to Rafael Nadal, 5–7, 6–1, 3–6)
24 May 2021– 30 May 2021	Belgrade Open	Belgrade (SRB)	250 Series	Clay	NH	N/A	250	Champion (defeated Alex Molčan, 6–4, 6–3)
31 May 2021– 13 June 2021	French Open	Paris (FRA)	Grand Slam	Clay	F	1200	2000	Champion (defeated Stefanos Tsitsipas, 6–7^{(6–8)}, 2–6, 6–3, 6–2, 6–4)
28 June 2021– 11 July 2021	Wimbledon	London (GBR)	Grand Slam	Grass	W	2000	2000	Champion (defeated Matteo Berrettini, 6–7^{(4–7)}, 6–4, 6–4, 6–3)
24 July 2021– 1 August 2021	Summer Olympics	Tokyo (JPN)	Olympic Games	Hard	NH	N/A	N/A	4th place (lost to Pablo Carreño Busta, 4–6, 7–6^{(8–6)}, 3–6)
16 August 2021– 22 August 2021	Cincinnati Masters	Cincinnati (USA)	Masters 1000	Hard	W	1000	0	Withdrew
30 August 2021– 12 September 2021	US Open	New York (USA)	Grand Slam	Hard	4R	180	1200	Final (lost to Daniil Medvedev, 4–6, 4–6, 4–6)
4 October 2021– 10 October 2021	Japan Open	Tokyo (JAP)	500 Series	Hard	W	500	0	Tournament cancelled due to the coronavirus pandemic
4 October 2021– 17 October 2021	Indian Wells Masters	Indian Wells (USA)	Masters 1000	Hard	3R	45	0	Withdrew
11 October 2021– 17 October 2021	Shanghai Masters	Shanghai (CHN)	Masters 1000	Hard	QF	180	0	Tournament cancelled due to the coronavirus pandemic
25 October 2021– 31 October 2021	Vienna Open	Vienna (AUT)	500 Series	Hard	QF	90	0	Withdrew
1 November 2021– 7 November 2021	Paris Masters	Paris (FRA)	Masters 1000	Hard	W	1000	1000	Champion (defeated Daniil Medvedev, 4–6, 6–3, 6–3)
14 November 2021– 21 November 2021	ATP Finals	Turin (ITA)	Tour Finals	Hard (i)	SF	400	600	Semifinals (lost to Alexander Zverev, 6–7^{(4–7)}, 6–4, 3–6)
25 November 2021– 5 December 2021	Davis Cup Finals	Innsbruck (AUT); Madrid (ESP)	Davis Cup	Hard (i)	QF	N/A	N/A	Semifinals ( Serbia lost to Croatia, 1–2)
Total year-end points						12030	11540	▼490 difference

=== Doubles schedule ===
Date	Tournament	Location	Tier	Surface	Prev. result	Prev. points	New points	Result
2 February 2021– 7 February 2021	ATP Cup	Melbourne (AUS)	ATP Cup	Hard	W	120	50 (120)	Round robin ( Serbia lost to Germany, 1–2)
21 June 2021– 27 June 2021	Mallorca Open	Santa Ponsa (ESP)	250 Series	Grass	NH	0	90	Final (withdrew)
4 October 2021– 17 October 2021	Indian Wells Masters	Indian Wells (USA)	Masters 1000	Hard	SF	360	0	Withdrew
11 October 2021– 17 October 2021	Shanghai Masters	Shanghai (CHN)	Masters 1000	Hard	2R	90	0	Tournament cancelled due to the coronavirus pandemic
1 November 2021– 7 November 2021	Paris Masters	Paris (FRA)	Masters 1000	Hard	N/A	N/A	90	2R (lost to John Peers / Filip Polášek, 6–7^{(2–7)}, 4–6)
22 November 2021– 5 December 2021	Davis Cup Finals	Innsbruck (AUT); Madrid (ESP)	Davis Cup	Hard (i)	QF	N/A	N/A	Semifinals ( Serbia lost to Croatia, 1–2)
Total year-end points						570	300	▼270 difference

== Yearly records ==
=== Head-to-head matchups ===
Novak Djokovic has a 55–7 ATP match win–loss record in the 2021 season. His record against players who were part of the ATP rankings Top Ten at the time of their meetings is 14–4. Bold indicates player was ranked top 10 at the time of at least one meeting. The following list is ordered by number of wins:

- (Italy) **Matteo Berrettini** 3–0
- (United States) Taylor Fritz 3–0
- (Germany) **Alexander Zverev** 3–2
- (Russia) **Daniil Medvedev** 2–1
- (Spain) Alejandro Davidovich Fokina 2–0
- (Hungary) Márton Fucsovics 2–0
- (Japan) Kei Nishikori 2–0
- (Canada) Denis Shapovalov 2–0
- (Germany) Jan-Lennard Struff 2–0
- (Greece) **Stefanos Tsitsipas** 2–0
- (Russia) Aslan Karatsev 1–1
- (Spain) **Rafael Nadal** 1–1
- (South Africa) Kevin Anderson 1–0
- (Lithuania) Ričardas Berankis 1–0
- (United States) Jenson Brooksby 1–0
- (Kazakhstan) Alexander Bublik 1–0
- (France) Jérémy Chardy 1–0
- (Croatia) Marin Čilić 1–0
- (Argentina) Federico Coria 1–0
- (Uruguay) Pablo Cuevas 1–0
- (Bolivia) Hugo Dellien 1–0
- (United Kingdom) Jack Draper 1–0
- (Chile) Cristian Garín 1–0
- (Netherlands) Tallon Griekspoor 1–0
- (Poland) **Hubert Hurkacz** 1–0
- (Serbia) Miomir Kecmanović 1–0
- (United States) Denis Kudla 1–0
- (Slovakia) Andrej Martin 1–0
- (Slovakia) Alex Molčan 1–0
- (Germany) Mats Moraing 1–0
- (Italy) Lorenzo Musetti 1–0
- (United Kingdom) Cameron Norrie 1–0
- (Austria) Dennis Novak 1–0
- (Canada) Milos Raonic 1–0
- (Russia) **Andrey Rublev** 1–0
- (Denmark) Holger Rune 1–0
- (Norway) **Casper Ruud** 1–0
- (United States) Tennys Sandgren 1–0
- (Italy) Jannik Sinner 1–0
- (Italy) Lorenzo Sonego 1–0
- (South Korea) Kwon Soon-woo 1–0
- (United States) Frances Tiafoe 1–0
- (Spain) Pablo Carreño Busta 0–1
- (United Kingdom) Dan Evans 0–1

* Statistics correct as of 3 December 2021.

=== Finals ===
==== Singles: 7 (5 titles, 2 runners-up) ====
Category Grand Slam (3–1) ATP Finals (0–0) Masters 1000 (1–1) 500 Series (0–0) 250 Series (1–0)	Titles by surface Hard (2–1) Clay (2–1) Grass (1–0)	Titles by setting Outdoor (4–2) Indoor (1–0)

Result	W–L	Date	Tournament	Tier	Surface	Opponent	Score
Win	1–0	Feb 2021	Australian Open, Australia (9)	Grand Slam	Hard	(Russia) Daniil Medvedev	7–5, 6–2, 6–2
Loss	1–1	May 2021	Italian Open, Italy	Masters 1000	Clay	(Spain) Rafael Nadal	5–7, 6–1, 3–6
Win	2–1	May 2021	Belgrade Open, Serbia	250 Series	Clay	(Slovakia) Alex Molčan	6–4, 6–3
Win	3–1	Jun 2021	French Open, France (2)	Grand Slam	Clay	(Greece) Stefanos Tsitsipas	6–7^{(6–8)}, 2–6, 6–3, 6–2, 6–4
Win	4–1	Jul 2021	Wimbledon, United Kingdom (6)	Grand Slam	Grass	(Italy) Matteo Berrettini	6–7^{(4–7)}, 6–4, 6–4, 6–3
Loss	4–2	Sep 2021	US Open, United States	Grand Slam	Hard	(Russia) Daniil Medvedev	4–6, 4–6, 4–6
Win	5–2	Nov 2021	Paris Masters, France	Masters	Hard (i)	(Russia) Daniil Medvedev	4–6, 6–3, 6–3

==== Doubles: 1 (1 runner-up) ====
Category Grand Slam (0–0) ATP Finals (0–0) Masters 1000 (0–0) 500 Series (0–0) 250 Series (0–1)	Titles by surface Hard (0–0) Clay (0–0) Grass (0–1)	Titles by setting Outdoor (0–1) Indoor (0–0)

Result	W–L	Date	Tournament	Tier	Surface	Partner	Opponents	Score
Walkover	0–1	Jun 2021	Mallorca Open, Spain	250 Series	Grass	(Spain) Carlos Gómez-Herrera	(Italy) Simone Bolelli (Argentina) Máximo González	Walkover

=== Earnings ===
- **Bold** font denotes tournament win

**Singles**
Event	Prize money	Year-to-date
ATP Cup	$191,000	$191,000
**Australian Open**	**A$2,750,000**	$2,081,075
Monte-Carlo Masters	€29,000	$2,115,570
Serbia Open	€34,710	$2,156,858
Italian Open	€145,000	$2,333,207
**Belgrade Open**	**€78,795**	$2,428,895
**French Open**	**€1,400,000**	$4,135,635
**Wimbledon Championships**	**£1,700,000**	$6,195,865
US Open	$1,250,000	$7,445,865
**Paris Masters**	**€800,000**	$8,377,225
ATP Finals	$692,000	$9,069,225
		$9,069,225
**Doubles**
Event	Prize money	Year-to-date
ATP Cup	$7,000	$7,000
Mallorca Open	€9,440	$18,591
Paris Masters	€10,935	$31,322
		$31,322
**Total**
		**$9,100,547**

Figures in United States dollars (USD) unless noted.

- source：2021 Singles Activity
- source：2021 Doubles Activity

== See also ==
- 2021 ATP Tour
- 2021 Rafael Nadal tennis season
- 2021 Daniil Medvedev tennis season
- List of Grand Slam men's singles champions
