= 2021 Rafael Nadal tennis season =

Statistics for Spanish tennis player

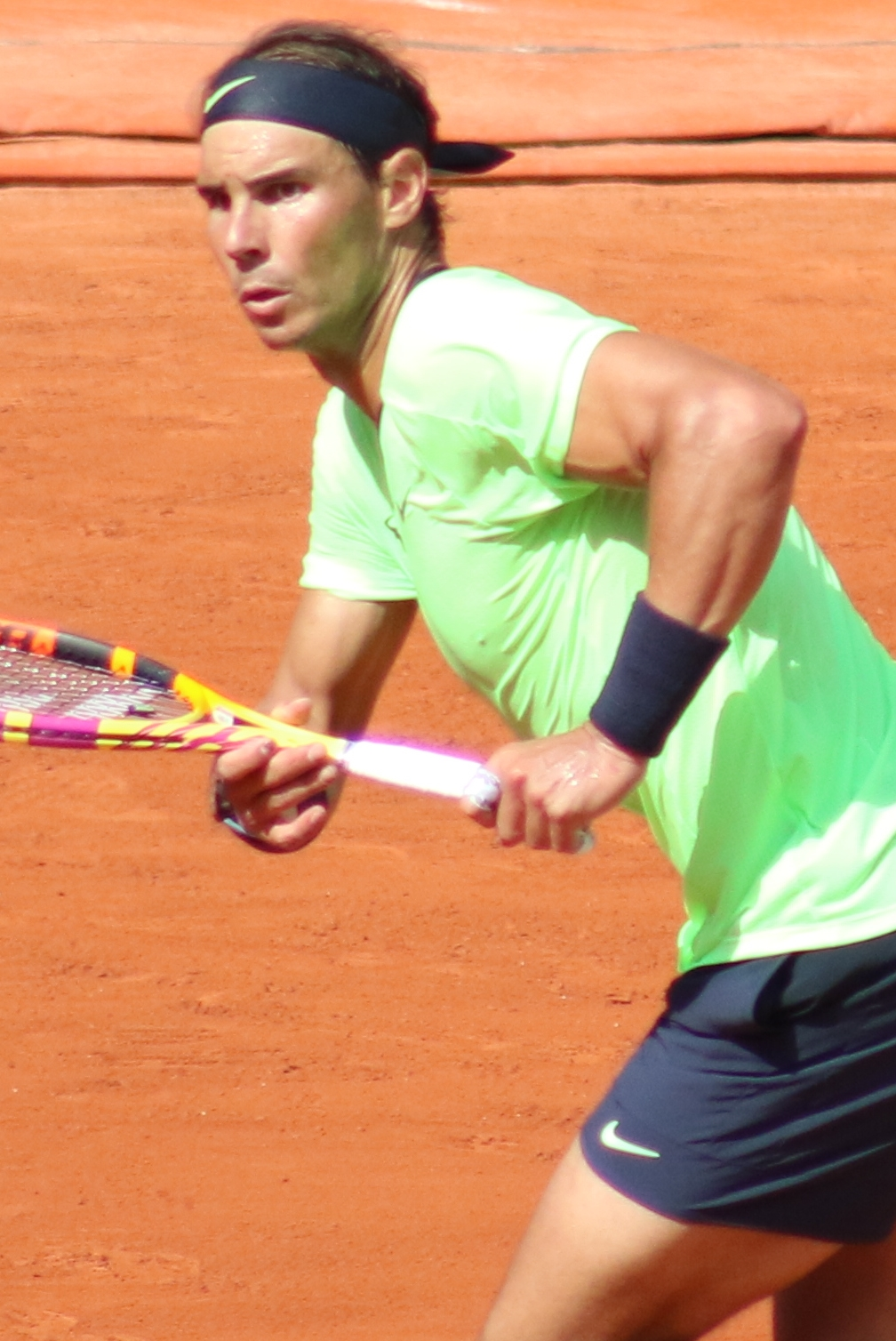
- Full name: Rafael Nadal Parera
- Country: Spain
- Calendar prize money: $1,478,832

Singles
- Season record: 24–5
- Calendar titles: 2
- Current ranking: No. 6
- Ranking change from previous year: ▼4

Grand Slam & significant results
- Australian Open: QF
- French Open: SF
- Wimbledon: A
- US Open: A

Doubles
- Season record: 0–0
- Current ranking: No. 511
- Ranking change from previous year: ▼36

The 2021 Rafael Nadal tennis season officially began on 9 February 2021, with the start of the Australian Open.

== Yearly summary ==
=== Early hard court season ===
==== ATP Cup ====
Rafael Nadal was scheduled to begin his season at the ATP Cup. However, despite being on the Spanish team, he did not play any matches due to minor back issues.

==== Australian Open ====
At the 2021 Australian Open, Nadal lost in the quarterfinals to Stefanos Tsitsipas, despite being two sets to love up. This marked only the second time Nadal has lost a grand slam match after being two sets up. It was overall the third time he lost from 2 sets up, the others happened at the US Open 2015 to Fabio Fognini, and Miami 2005 to Roger Federer in the final when Masters finals were best of 5.

==== Indian Wells Masters ====
Indian Wells Masters was scheduled to take place in March 2021 but was postponed due to coronavirus concerns.

==== Miami Open ====
Nadal withdrew from the Miami Open.

=== Spring clay court season ===
==== Monte-Carlo Masters ====
Nadal won his first two matches losing a total of just 5 games in both combined, but then lost to Andrey Rublev in the quarterfinals in three sets.

==== Barcelona Open ====
Nadal saved a match point to defeat Stefanos Tsitsipas, in 3 hours and 38 minutes, the longest final since 1991 (when records began). This was his record-extending 12th title at the event.

==== Madrid Open ====
Nadal lost to Alexander Zverev in the quarterfinals.

==== Italian Open ====
Nadal saved two match points to defeat Denis Shapovalov. He then beat Alexander Zverev and Reilly Opelka to reach the final, where he defeated longtime rival Novak Djokovic in three sets.

==== French Open ====
At the French Open, Nadal entered as the heavy favorite seeking to become the first man to win 21 majors. He reached the semifinals after wins over Jannik Sinner and Diego Schwartzman, where he encountered Novak Djokovic in a rematch of the previous year's final. There, Nadal was upset by eventual champion Djokovic in four sets, in only his third-ever loss at the French Open.

=== Grass court season ===
==== Wimbledon ====
Nadal withdrew from both Wimbledon and the Olympics, citing schedule reasons.

=== North American hard court season ===
==== Washington (Citi Open) ====
Nadal made his Washington debut in 2021. He faced Jack Sock in his opener, his first match since losing to Novak Djokovic at the French Open. Nadal recovered from a break down in the third set, prevailing in a final set tiebreak. He lost in the round of 16 to Lloyd Harris in three sets.

Following more injury problems, Nadal withdrew from Toronto and Cincinnati, and, on August 20, ended his season, citing his ongoing foot injury as the main issue.

== All matches ==
This table chronicles all the matches of Rafael Nadal in 2021.

Key
| W | F | SF | QF | #R | RR | Q# | P# | DNQ | A | Z# | PO | G | S | B | NMS | NTI | P | NH |

(W) winner; (F) finalist; (SF) semifinalist; (QF) quarterfinalist; (#R) rounds 4, 3, 2, 1; (RR) round-robin stage; (Q#) qualification round; (P#) preliminary round; (DNQ) did not qualify; (A) absent; (Z#) Davis/Fed Cup Zonal Group (with number indication) or (PO) play-off; (G) gold, (S) silver or (B) bronze Olympic/Paralympic medal; (NMS) not a Masters tournament; (NTI) not a Tier I tournament; (P) postponed; (NH) not held; (SR) strike rate (events won / competed); (W–L) win–loss record.
To avoid confusion and double counting, these charts are updated at the conclusion of a tournament or when the player's participation has ended.

=== Singles matches ===
| Tournament | Match | Round | Opponent (seed or key) | Rank | Result | Score |
|---|---|---|---|---|---|---|
ATP Cup; Melbourne, Australia; ATP Cup; Hard, outdoor 2 – 7 February 2021
| ATP Cup; Melbourne, Australia; ATP Cup; Hard, outdoor 2 – 7 February 2021 | Withdrew | | | | | |
Australian Open; Melbourne, Australia; Grand Slam tournament Hard, outdoor 8 – 21 February 2021
| Australian Open; Melbourne, Australia; Grand Slam tournament Hard, outdoor 8 – 21 February 2021 | 1 / 1209 | 1R | (Serbia) Laslo Đere | 56 | Win | 6–3, 6–4, 6–1 |
| Australian Open; Melbourne, Australia; Grand Slam tournament Hard, outdoor 8 – 21 February 2021 | 2 / 1210 | 2R | (United States) Michael Mmoh (Q) | 177 | Win | 6–1, 6–4, 6–2 |
| Australian Open; Melbourne, Australia; Grand Slam tournament Hard, outdoor 8 – 21 February 2021 | 3 / 1211 | 3R | (United Kingdom) Cameron Norrie | 69 | Win | 7–5, 6–2, 7–5 |
| Australian Open; Melbourne, Australia; Grand Slam tournament Hard, outdoor 8 – 21 February 2021 | 4 / 1212 | 4R | (Italy) Fabio Fognini (16) | 17 | Win | 6–3, 6–4, 6–2 |
| Australian Open; Melbourne, Australia; Grand Slam tournament Hard, outdoor 8 – 21 February 2021 | 5 / 1213 | QF | (Greece) Stefanos Tsitsipas (5) | 6 | Loss | 6–3, 6–2, 6–7^{(4–7)}, 4–6, 5–7 |
Monte-Carlo Masters; Monte Carlo, Monaco; ATP 1000; Clay, outdoor 12 – 18 April 2021
| Monte-Carlo Masters; Monte Carlo, Monaco; ATP 1000; Clay, outdoor 12 – 18 April 2021 | – | 1R | Bye | | | |
| Monte-Carlo Masters; Monte Carlo, Monaco; ATP 1000; Clay, outdoor 12 – 18 April 2021 | 6 / 1214 | 2R | (Argentina) Federico Delbonis (Q) | 87 | Win | 6–1, 6–2 |
| Monte-Carlo Masters; Monte Carlo, Monaco; ATP 1000; Clay, outdoor 12 – 18 April 2021 | 7 / 1215 | 3R | (Bulgaria) Grigor Dimitrov (14) | 17 | Win | 6–1, 6–1 |
| Monte-Carlo Masters; Monte Carlo, Monaco; ATP 1000; Clay, outdoor 12 – 18 April 2021 | 8 / 1216 | QF | (Russia) Andrey Rublev (6) | 8 | Loss | 2–6, 6–4, 2–6 |
Barcelona Open; Barcelona, Spain; ATP 500; Clay, outdoor 19 – 25 April 2021
| Barcelona Open; Barcelona, Spain; ATP 500; Clay, outdoor 19 – 25 April 2021 | – | 1R | Bye | | | |
| Barcelona Open; Barcelona, Spain; ATP 500; Clay, outdoor 19 – 25 April 2021 | 9 / 1217 | 2R | (Belarus) Ilya Ivashka (Q) | 111 | Win | 3–6, 6–2, 6–4 |
| Barcelona Open; Barcelona, Spain; ATP 500; Clay, outdoor 19 – 25 April 2021 | 10 / 1218 | 3R | (Japan) Kei Nishikori | 39 | Win | 6–0, 2–6, 6–2 |
| Barcelona Open; Barcelona, Spain; ATP 500; Clay, outdoor 19 – 25 April 2021 | 11 / 1219 | QF | (United Kingdom) Cameron Norrie | 58 | Win | 6–1, 6–4 |
| Barcelona Open; Barcelona, Spain; ATP 500; Clay, outdoor 19 – 25 April 2021 | 12 / 1220 | SF | (Spain) Pablo Carreño Busta (6) | 13 | Win | 6–3, 6–2 |
| Barcelona Open; Barcelona, Spain; ATP 500; Clay, outdoor 19 – 25 April 2021 | 13 / 1221 | W | (Greece) Stefanos Tsitsipas (2) | 5 | Win (1) | 6–4, 6–7^{(6–8)}, 7–5 |
Madrid Open; Madrid, Spain; ATP 1000; Clay, outdoor 2 – 9 May 2021
| Madrid Open; Madrid, Spain; ATP 1000; Clay, outdoor 2 – 9 May 2021 | – | 1R | Bye | | | |
| Madrid Open; Madrid, Spain; ATP 1000; Clay, outdoor 2 – 9 May 2021 | 14 / 1222 | 2R | (Spain) Carlos Alcaraz (WC) | 120 | Win | 6–1, 6–2 |
| Madrid Open; Madrid, Spain; ATP 1000; Clay, outdoor 2 – 9 May 2021 | 15 / 1223 | 3R | (Australia) Alexei Popyrin (Q) | 76 | Win | 6–3, 6–3 |
| Madrid Open; Madrid, Spain; ATP 1000; Clay, outdoor 2 – 9 May 2021 | 16 / 1224 | QF | (Germany) Alexander Zverev (5) | 6 | Loss | 4–6, 4–6 |
Italian Open; Rome, Italy; ATP 1000; Clay, outdoor 9 – 16 May 2021
| Italian Open; Rome, Italy; ATP 1000; Clay, outdoor 9 – 16 May 2021 | – | 1R | Bye | | | |
| Italian Open; Rome, Italy; ATP 1000; Clay, outdoor 9 – 16 May 2021 | 17 / 1225 | 2R | (Italy) Jannik Sinner | 18 | Win | 7–5, 6–4 |
| Italian Open; Rome, Italy; ATP 1000; Clay, outdoor 9 – 16 May 2021 | 18 / 1226 | 3R | (Canada) Denis Shapovalov (13) | 14 | Win | 3–6, 6–4, 7–6^{(7–3)} |
| Italian Open; Rome, Italy; ATP 1000; Clay, outdoor 9 – 16 May 2021 | 19 / 1227 | QF | (Germany) Alexander Zverev (6) | 6 | Win | 6–3, 6–4 |
| Italian Open; Rome, Italy; ATP 1000; Clay, outdoor 9 – 16 May 2021 | 20 / 1228 | SF | (United States) Reilly Opelka | 47 | Win | 6–4, 6–4 |
| Italian Open; Rome, Italy; ATP 1000; Clay, outdoor 9 – 16 May 2021 | 21 / 1229 | W | (Serbia) Novak Djokovic (1) | 1 | Win (2) | 7–5, 1–6, 6–3 |
French Open; Paris, France; Grand Slam tournament Clay, outdoor 30 May – 13 June 2021
| French Open; Paris, France; Grand Slam tournament Clay, outdoor 30 May – 13 June 2021 | 22 / 1230 | 1R | (Australia) Alexei Popyrin | 63 | Win | 6–3, 6–2, 7–6^{(7–3)} |
| French Open; Paris, France; Grand Slam tournament Clay, outdoor 30 May – 13 June 2021 | 23 / 1231 | 2R | (France) Richard Gasquet | 53 | Win | 6–0, 7–5, 6–2 |
| French Open; Paris, France; Grand Slam tournament Clay, outdoor 30 May – 13 June 2021 | 24 / 1232 | 3R | (United Kingdom) Cameron Norrie | 45 | Win | 6–3, 6–3, 6–3 |
| French Open; Paris, France; Grand Slam tournament Clay, outdoor 30 May – 13 June 2021 | 25 / 1233 | 4R | (Italy) Jannik Sinner (18) | 19 | Win | 7–5, 6–3, 6–0 |
| French Open; Paris, France; Grand Slam tournament Clay, outdoor 30 May – 13 June 2021 | 26 / 1234 | QF | (Argentina) Diego Schwartzman (10) | 10 | Win | 6–3, 4–6, 6–4, 6–0 |
| French Open; Paris, France; Grand Slam tournament Clay, outdoor 30 May – 13 June 2021 | 27 / 1235 | SF | (Serbia) Novak Djokovic (1) | 1 | Loss | 6–3, 3–6, 6–7^{(4–7)}, 2–6 |
Citi Open; Washington, United States; ATP 500; Hard, outdoor 31 July – 8 August 2021
| Citi Open; Washington, United States; ATP 500; Hard, outdoor 31 July – 8 August 2021 | – | 1R | Bye | | | |
| Citi Open; Washington, United States; ATP 500; Hard, outdoor 31 July – 8 August 2021 | 28 / 1236 | 2R | (United States) Jack Sock (WC) | 192 | Win | 6–2, 4–6, 7–6^{(7–1)} |
| Citi Open; Washington, United States; ATP 500; Hard, outdoor 31 July – 8 August 2021 | 29 / 1237 | 3R | (South Africa) Lloyd Harris (14) | 50 | Loss | 4–6, 6–1, 4–6 |
Canadian Open; Toronto, Canada; ATP 1000; Hard, outdoor 6 – 15 August 2021
| Canadian Open; Toronto, Canada; ATP 1000; Hard, outdoor 6 – 15 August 2021 | Withdrew | | | | | |

== Exhibition matches ==
=== Singles ===
| Tournament | Match | Round | Opponent (seed or key) | Rank | Result | Score |
|---|---|---|---|---|---|---|
A Day at the Drive; Adelaide, Australia Hard, outdoor 29 January 2021
| A Day at the Drive; Adelaide, Australia Hard, outdoor 29 January 2021 | 1 | – | (Austria) Dominic Thiem | 3 | Win | 7–5, 6–4 |

== Schedule ==
Per Rafael Nadal, this is his current 2021 schedule (subject to change). The ATP rankings are currently affected by the COVID-19 pandemic; they are on a Best of 24-month basis through the week of 15 March 2021. Until then, all the events are non-mandatory and players can use the best result from the same event in that 24-month span.

=== Singles schedule ===
| Date | Tournament | Location | Tier | Surface | Prev. result | Prev. points | New points | Result |
|---|---|---|---|---|---|---|---|---|
| 2 February 2021– 7 February 2021 | ATP Cup | Melbourne (AUS) | ATP Cup | Hard | F | 250 | 0 (250 (Note: Points carried over due to the Best of 24-month ranking being extended through and including the week of 1 March 2021.)) | Withdrew due to minor back issues |
| 8 February 2021– 21 February 2021 | Australian Open | Melbourne (AUS) | Grand Slam | Hard | QF | 360 | 360 | Quarterfinals (lost to (Greece) Stefanos Tsitsipas, 6–3, 6–2, 6–7^{(4–7)}, 4–6, 5–7) |
| 15 March 2021– 20 March 2021 | Mexican Open | Acapulco (MEX) | 500 Series | Hard | W | 500 | 0 (500) | Withdrew |
| 22 March 2021– 4 April 2021 | Miami Open | Miami (USA) | Masters 1000 | Hard | NH | N/A | N/A | Withdrew |
| 12 April 2021– 18 April 2021 | Monte Carlo Masters | Monte Carlo (MON) | Masters 1000 | Clay | SF | 360 | 180 | Quarterfinals (lost to (Russia) Andrey Rublev, 2–6, 6–4, 2–6) |
| 19 April 2021– 25 April 2021 | Barcelona Open | Barcelona (ESP) | 500 Series | Clay | SF | 180 | 500 | Champion (defeated (Greece) Stefanos Tsitsipas, 6-4, 6–7^{(6–8)}, 7–5) |
| 3 May 2021– 9 May 2021 | Madrid Open | Madrid (ESP) | Masters 1000 | Clay | SF | 360 | 180 | Quarterfinals (lost to (Germany) Alexander Zverev, 4–6, 4–6) |
| 9 May 2021– 16 May 2021 | Italian Open | Rome (ITA) | Masters 1000 | Clay | QF | 180 (1000) | 1000 | Champion (defeated (Serbia) Novak Djokovic, 7-5, 1–6, 6–3) |
| 31 May 2021– 13 June 2021 | French Open | Paris (FRA) | Grand Slam | Clay | W | 2000 | 720 (1000 (Note: Points carried over due to the Best of 24-month ranking being used for events between 4 March – 5 August 2019, that were not played in 2020, but weighted at 50%.)) | Semifinals (lost to (Serbia) Novak Djokovic, 6–3, 3–6, 6–7^{(4–7)}, 2–6) |
| 28 June 2021– 11 July 2021 | Wimbledon | London (GBR) | Grand Slam | Grass | SF | 720 | 0 (360) | Withdrew |
| 31 July 2021– 8 August 2021 | Citi Open | Washington (USA) | 500 Series | Hard | A | N/A | 45 | Third round (lost to L Harris, 4–6, 6–1,4-6) |
| 6 August 2021– 15 August 2021 | Canadian Open | Toronto (CAN) | Masters 1000 | Hard | NH | 1000 | 0 (500) | Withdrew |
| 15 August 2021– 22 August 2021 | Cincinnati Masters | Mason (USA) | Masters 1000 | Hard | A | 0 | 0 | Withdrew |
| 6 August 2021– 15 August 2021 | US Open | New York (USA) | Grand Slam | Hard | A | 0 (2000) | 0 | Withdrew |
| 4 October 2021– 11 October 2021 | Indian Wells Masters | Indian Wells (USA) | Masters 1000 | Hard | NH | 360 | 0 | Withdrew |
| 1 November 2021– 7 November 2021 | Paris Masters | Paris (FRA) | Masters 1000 | Hard | SF | 360 | 0 | Withdrew |
| Total year-end points | | | | | | 9850 | 4875 | ▼4975 difference |

== Yearly records ==
=== Head-to-head matchups ===
Rafael Nadal has a 24–5 ATP match win–loss record in the 2021 season. His record against players who were part of the ATP rankings Top Ten at the time of their meetings is 4–4. Bold indicates player was ranked top 10 at the time of at least one meeting. The following list is ordered by number of wins:

- (United Kingdom) Cameron Norrie 3–0
- (Australia) Alexei Popyrin 2–0
- (Italy) Jannik Sinner 2–0
- (Spain) Carlos Alcaraz 1–0
- (Spain) Pablo Carreño Busta 1–0
- (Argentina) Federico Delbonis 1–0
- (Serbia) Laslo Đere 1–0
- (Bulgaria) Grigor Dimitrov 1–0
- (Italy) Fabio Fognini 1–0
- (France) Richard Gasquet 1–0
- (Belarus) Ilya Ivashka 1–0
- (United States) Michael Mmoh 1–0
- (Japan) Kei Nishikori 1–0
- (United States) Reilly Opelka 1–0
- (Argentina) **Diego Schwartzman** 1–0
- (Canada) Denis Shapovalov 1–0
- (United States) Jack Sock 1–0
- (Greece) **Stefanos Tsitsipas** 1–1
- (Germany) **Alexander Zverev** 1–1
- (Serbia) **Novak Djokovic** 1–1
- (South Africa) Lloyd Harris 0–1
- (Russia) **Andrey Rublev** 0–1

* Statistics correct as of 5 August 2021.

=== Top 10 wins ===
| # | Player | Rank | Event | Surface | Rd | Score | RNR |
|---|---|---|---|---|---|---|---|
| 1/175. | (Greece) Stefanos Tsitsipas | 5 | Barcelona, Spain | Clay | F | 6–4, 6–7^{(6–8)}, 7–5 | 3 |
| 2/176. | (Germany) Alexander Zverev | 6 | Rome, Italy | Clay | QF | 6–3, 6–4 | 3 |
| 3/177. | (Serbia) Novak Djokovic | 1 | Rome, Italy | Clay | F | 7–5, 1–6, 6–3 | 3 |
| 4/178. | (Argentina) Diego Schwartzman | 10 | French Open, Paris, France | Clay | QF | 6–3, 4–6, 6–4, 6–0 | 3 |

=== Finals ===
==== Singles: 2 (2 titles) ====
| Category Grand Slam (0–0) ATP Finals (0–0) Masters 1000 (1–0) 500 Series (1–0) 250 Series (0–0) | Titles by surface Hard (0–0) Clay (2–0) Grass (0–0) | Titles by setting Outdoor (2–0) Indoor (0–0) |

| Result | W–L | Date | Tournament | Tier | Surface | Opponent | Score |
|---|---|---|---|---|---|---|---|
| Win | 1–0 | Apr 2021 | Barcelona Open, Spain** (12) | 500 Series | Clay | (Greece) Stefanos Tsitsipas | 6–4, 6–7^{(6–8)}, 7–5 |
| Win | 2–0 | May 2021 | Italian Open, Italy** (10) | Masters 1000 | Clay | (Serbia) Novak Djokovic | 7–5, 1–6, 6–3 |

(**) signifies tournaments where Nadal won the title after saving at least one match point.

=== Earnings ===
- **Bold** font denotes tournament win

**Singles**
| Event | Prize money | Year-to-date |
| Australian Open | A$525,000 | $360,832 |
| Monte-Carlo Masters | €46,500 | $416,144 |
| **Barcelona Open** | **€178,985** | $629,046 |
| Madrid Open | €58,370 | $699,195 |
| **Italian Open** | **€245,085** | $997,268 |
| French Open | €375,000 | $1,454,432 |
| Washington Open | $24,400 | $1,478,832 |
| | | $1,478,832 |
**Total**
| | | **$1,478,832** |

Figures in United States dollars (USD) unless noted.

- source：2021 Singles Activity
- source：2021 Doubles Activity

== See also ==
- 2021 ATP Tour
- 2021 Novak Djokovic tennis season
