= 2021 Western & Southern Open – Women's doubles =

Women's doubles
- 2021 Western & Southern Open

Final
- Champions: (Australia) Samantha Stosur (China) Zhang Shuai
- Runners-up: (Canada) Gabriela Dabrowski (Brazil) Luisa Stefani
- Score: 7–5, 6–3

Details
- Seeds: 8

Events
Singles	men	women
Doubles	men	women
← 2020 ·	Western & Southern Open	· 2022 →

Květa Peschke and Demi Schuurs were the defending champions, but chose to compete with different partners. Peschke partnered Ellen Perez, and Schuurs partnered Nicole Melichar. Both teams lost to Samantha Stosur and Zhang Shuai; Perez and Peschke did so in the second round, whilst Melichar and Schuurs lost in the quarterfinals.

Stosur and Zhang went on to win the title, defeating Gabriela Dabrowski and Luisa Stefani in the final, 7–5, 6–3.

== Seeds ==
The top four seeds received a bye into the second round.

1. (Chinese Taipei) Hsieh Su-wei / (Belgium) Elise Mertens (second round)
2. (Czech Republic) Barbora Krejčíková / (Czech Republic) Kateřina Siniaková (semifinals)
3. (Japan) Shuko Aoyama / (Japan) Ena Shibahara (quarterfinals)
4. (United States) Nicole Melichar / (Netherlands) Demi Schuurs (quarterfinals)
5. (Chile) Alexa Guarachi / (United States) Desirae Krawczyk (first round)
6. (Canada) Gabriela Dabrowski / (Brazil) Luisa Stefani (final)
7. (Chinese Taipei) Chan Hao-ching / (Chinese Taipei) Latisha Chan (first round)
8. (Croatia) Darija Jurak / (Slovenia) Andreja Klepač (second round)

== Draw ==
=== Key ===
- Q = Qualifier
- WC = Wild card
- LL = Lucky loser
- Alt = Alternate
- ITF = ITF entry
- PR = Protected ranking
- SR = Special ranking
- SE = Special exempt
- JE = Junior exempt
- JR = Junior Accelerator Programme entrant
- CO = College Accelerator Programme entrant
- NG = Next Gen Accelerator Program entrant
- w/o = Walkover
- r = Retired
- d = Defaulted

=== Finals ===
Semifinals
(Russia) Anna Blinkova (Belarus) Aliaksandra Sasnovich	6	5	[5]
(Australia) Samantha Stosur (China) Zhang Shuai	4	7	[10]
6	(Canada) Gabriela Dabrowski (Brazil) Luisa Stefani	7	3	[10]
2	(Czech Republic) Barbora Krejčíková (Czech Republic) Kateřina Siniaková	5	6	[7]

Final
(Australia) Samantha Stosur (China) Zhang Shuai	7	6
6	(Canada) Gabriela Dabrowski (Brazil) Luisa Stefani	5	3

=== Top half ===
First round
(United States) H Carter (United States) S Santamaria	5	4
(Russia) A Blinkova (Belarus) A Sasnovich	7	6
(Ukraine) N Kichenok (Romania) R Olaru	3	2
(Spain) P Badosa (Spain) S Sorribes Tormo	6	6
(United States) C Gauff (United States) C McNally	6	6
5	(Chile) A Guarachi (United States) D Krawczyk	3	3
(Russia) V Kudermetova (Kazakhstan) E Rybakina	7	6
PR	(Tunisia) O Jabeur (India) S Mirza	5	2
WC	(Poland) M Linette (United States) B Pera	6	4	[4]
(Australia) S Stosur (China) S Zhang	4	6	[10]
(Australia) E Perez (Czech Republic) K Peschke	2	7^{7}	[10]
7	(Chinese Taipei) H-c Chan (Chinese Taipei) L Chan	6	6^{1}	[6]

Second round
1	(Chinese Taipei) S-w Hsieh (Belgium) E Mertens	5	7	[5]
(Russia) A Blinkova (Belarus) A Sasnovich	7	5	[10]
(Spain) P Badosa (Spain) S Sorribes Tormo	6	3	[10]
(United States) C Gauff (United States) C McNally	4	6	[8]
4	(United States) N Melichar (Netherlands) D Schuurs	6	6
(Russia) V Kudermetova (Kazakhstan) E Rybakina	4	4
(Australia) S Stosur (China) S Zhang	6	3	[10]
(Australia) E Perez (Czech Republic) K Peschke	3	6	[6]

Quarterfinals
(Russia) A Blinkova (Belarus) A Sasnovich	4	6	[10]
(Spain) P Badosa (Spain) S Sorribes Tormo	6	4	[3]
4	(United States) N Melichar (Netherlands) D Schuurs	3	7^{7}	[4]
(Australia) S Stosur (China) S Zhang	6	6^{5}	[10]

Semifinals
(Russia) A Blinkova (Belarus) A Sasnovich	6	5	[5]
(Australia) S Stosur (China) S Zhang	4	7	[10]

=== Bottom half ===
First round
6	(Canada) G Dabrowski (Brazil) L Stefani	6	6
PR	(Kazakhstan) A Danilina (Kazakhstan) Y Shvedova	3	4
(Belarus) V Azarenka (United States) J Pegula	6	2	[10]
(Ukraine) L Kichenok (Japan) M Ninomiya	2	6	[6]
(Latvia) J Ostapenko (Switzerland) J Teichmann	6	6
PR	(Kazakhstan) G Voskoboeva (Russia) V Zvonareva	3	3
8	(Croatia) D Jurak (Slovenia) A Klepač	4	6	[10]
(Czech Republic) M Bouzková (Czech Republic) L Hradecká	6	3	[7]
(United States) B Mattek-Sands (Poland) I Świątek	2	7	[10]
(Croatia) P Martić (United States) S Rogers	6	5	[5]
WC	(United States) E Navarro (United States) P Stearns	2	5
(Russia) D Kasatkina (Estonia) A Kontaveit	6	7

Second round
6	(Canada) G Dabrowski (Brazil) L Stefani	6	4	[10]
(Belarus) V Azarenka (United States) J Pegula	4	6	[7]
(Latvia) J Ostapenko (Switzerland) J Teichmann	3	3
3	(Japan) S Aoyama (Japan) E Shibahara	6	6
8	(Croatia) D Jurak (Slovenia) A Klepač	6	1	[3]
(United States) B Mattek-Sands (Poland) I Świątek	4	6	[10]
(Russia) D Kasatkina (Estonia) A Kontaveit	2	1
2	(Czech Republic) B Krejčíková (Czech Republic) K Siniaková	6	6

Quarterfinals
6	(Canada) G Dabrowski (Brazil) L Stefani	6	6
3	(Japan) S Aoyama (Japan) E Shibahara	3	3
(United States) B Mattek-Sands (Poland) I Świątek	4	3
2	(Czech Republic) B Krejčíková (Czech Republic) K Siniaková	6	6

Semifinals
6	(Canada) G Dabrowski (Brazil) L Stefani	7	3	[10]
2	(Czech Republic) B Krejčíková (Czech Republic) K Siniaková	5	6	[7]
