= ATP Cup =

Outdoor hard court men's tennis tournament

Defunct tennis tournament
- Founded: 15 November 2018
- Abolished: 7 August 2022
- Editions: 3
- Location: Brisbane, Melbourne, Perth, Sydney; Australia
- Venue: Pat Rafter Arena; Melbourne Park; Perth Arena; Ken Rosewall Arena
- Surface: Hardcourt
- Draw: 12–24 teams
- Prize money: USD 10,000,000
- Current champion: Canada (1st title)
- Website: www.atpcup.com

The ATP Cup was an international outdoor hard court men's tennis team tournament, which ran from 2020 to 2022. The tournament was played across one or three Australian cities over ten days in the lead up to the Australian Open, and featured teams from 12, 16 or 24 countries. The event was the first ATP team competition since the ATP World Team Cup, which was held in Düsseldorf from 1978 to 2012.

== History ==
On 2 July 2018, ATP director Chris Kermode announced that he had plans to organise a men's team tennis tournament in response to the Davis Cup changing their format six months earlier. The tournament at the time of the announcement had the name World Team Cup, taking from the previous World Team Cup that took place in Düsseldorf from 1978 to 2012.

On 15 November, the ATP and Tennis Australia announced that the tournament would be known as the ATP Cup, with 24 teams playing at three cities in preparation for the Australian Open. Those cities would later be revealed to be Sydney, Brisbane and Perth; the new event would also result in the cancellation of the similar mixed-gender Hopman Cup tournament previously played in Perth (it would later be revived in 2023, relocated to Nice, France).

The tournament took place in Sydney, Brisbane, and Perth, with Sydney the hosts of the quarter-finals onwards. In 2021, the tournament was deferred several weeks, and moved to Melbourne Park with 12 teams, due to the restrictions on domestic travel in Australia stemming from the COVID-19 pandemic. The 2022 event would be held in Sydney with 16 teams as these restrictions were ongoing.

Following the 2022 Russian invasion of Ukraine, the ITF barred Russia and Belarus from competing at the tournament.

On 7 August 2022, amid an unsuccessful run hampered by low attendance and COVID-19-related issues, Tennis Australia announced that the ATP Cup would be replaced by a new mixed team event known as the United Cup beginning in 2023. The new event is a collaboration between Tennis Australia, the ATP, and the WTA, with players in the group stage also eligible to receive ATP and WTA rankings points.

== Qualification ==
The teams that participated in the Cup were determined by the singles ranking of their best player. In the week after the US Open, 18 teams were announced, based on the best player singles ranking. For a country to qualify, it had to have at least three players with ATP ranking, and two of them with singles ranking. The next six teams were announced the week of the ATP Finals. If the host did not qualify on the first deadline of September, it would be awarded a wild card, leaving only five spots for the November deadline.

== Tournament ==
The format saw 24 teams divided into six groups of four teams each. The teams faced in ties composed of two singles matches and one doubles match. The match between the No. 2 of each team opened the tie, then the No.1 of each team, and the doubles match closing the tie. The doubles match would be played regardless whether the tie is decided or not. The winner from each group was joined by the two best second placed teams in the quarterfinals of the tournament for three knock-out rounds, culminating in the champion being crowned.

== Prize money and trophies ==
In 2020 ABC Bullion, a Pallion company, was awarded the rights to make the Cup. The cups were produced by W.J. Sanders, a sister division within Pallion and took over 250 hours to produce.

== Finals ==
| Year | Champions | Runners-up | Score |
|---|---|---|---|
| 2020 | Serbia | Spain | 2–1 |
| 2021 | Russia | Italy | 2–0 |
| 2022 | Canada | Spain | 2–0 |

== Results by nation ==
| Country | 2020 | | 2021 | | 2022 | | Overall | | |
| Country | Rnd | W–L | Rnd | W–L | Rnd | W–L | Yrs | Won | W–L |
|---|---|---|---|---|---|---|---|---|---|
| Argentina | QF | 2–2 | RR | 1–1 | RR | 2–1 | 3 | 0 | 5–4 |
| Australia | SF | 4–1 | RR | 1–1 | RR | 2–1 | 3 | 0 | 7–3 |
| Austria | RR | 1–2 | RR | 0–2 | – | – | 2 | 0 | 1–4 |
| Belgium | QF | 2–2 | – | – | – | – | 1 | 0 | 2–2 |
| Bulgaria | RR | 2–1 | – | – | – | – | 1 | 0 | 2–1 |
| Canada | QF | 2–2 | RR | 0–2 | W | 4–1 | 3 | 1 | 6–5 |
| Chile | RR | 0–3 | – | – | RR | 2–1 | 2 | 0 | 2–4 |
| Croatia | RR | 2–1 | – | – | – | – | 1 | 0 | 2–1 |
| France | RR | 1–2 | RR | 1–1 | RR | 0–3 | 3 | 0 | 2–6 |
| Georgia | RR | 1–2 | – | – | RR | 0–3 | 2 | 0 | 1–5 |
| Germany | RR | 1–2 | SF | 2–1 | RR | 1–2 | 3 | 0 | 4–5 |
| Great Britain | QF | 2–2 | – | – | RR | 2–1 | 2 | 0 | 4–3 |
| Greece | RR | 0–3 | RR | 1–1 | RR | 1–2 | 3 | 0 | 2–6 |
| Italy | RR | 2–1 | F | 3–1 | RR | 1–2 | 3 | 0 | 6–4 |
| Japan | RR | 2–1 | RR | 0–2 | – | – | 2 | 0 | 2–3 |
| Moldova | RR | 0–3 | – | – | – | – | 1 | 0 | 0–3 |
| Norway | RR | 1–2 | – | – | RR | 0–3 | 2 | 0 | 1–5 |
| Poland | RR | 1–2 | – | – | SF | 3–1 | 2 | 0 | 4–3 |
| Russia | SF | 4–1 | W | 4–0 | SF | 3–1 | 3 | 1 | 11–2 |
| Serbia | W | 6–0 | RR | 1–1 | RR | 1–2 | 3 | 1 | 8–3 |
| South Africa | RR | 2–1 | – | – | – | – | 1 | 0 | 2–1 |
| Spain | F | 5–1 | SF | 1–2 | F | 4–1 | 3 | 0 | 10–4 |
| United States | RR | 0–3 | – | – | RR | 1–2 | 2 | 0 | 1–5 |
| Uruguay | RR | 0–3 | – | – | – | – | 1 | 0 | 0–3 |

== See also ==
- Davis Cup
- Billie Jean King Cup
- United Cup
- Hopman Cup
