= 2021 Western & Southern Open =

- Date: August 15–22
- Edition: 120th (men) / 93rd (women)
- Category: ATP Tour Masters 1000 (men); WTA 1000 (women)
- Surface: Hard
- Location: Mason, Ohio, United States
- Venue: Lindner Family Tennis Center

Champions

Men's singles
- (Germany) Alexander Zverev

Women's singles
- (Australia) Ashleigh Barty

Men's doubles
- (Spain) Marcel Granollers / (Argentina) Horacio Zeballos

Women's doubles
- (Australia) Samantha Stosur / (China) Zhang Shuai
- Cincinnati Open

The 2021 Western & Southern Open was a men's and women's tennis tournament played on outdoor hard courts from August 15–22, 2021, as part of the US Open Series. It was a Masters 1000 tournament on the 2021 ATP Tour and a WTA 1000 tournament on the 2021 WTA Tour.

The 2021 tournament was the 120th men's edition and the 93rd women's edition of the Cincinnati Open and took place at the Lindner Family Tennis Center in Mason, Ohio, a northern suburb of Cincinnati, in the United States, making its return to Ohio for the first time since the 2019 tournament after being held in New York City for 2020 due to the COVID-19 pandemic in the United States. It operated at full spectator capacity as participants were required to have tested negative for COVID-19 or be fully vaccinated.

== Champions ==
=== Men's singles ===
- (Germany) Alexander Zverev def. (Russia) Andrey Rublev, 6–2, 6–3

=== Women's singles ===
- (Australia) Ashleigh Barty def. (Switzerland) Jil Teichmann, 6–3, 6–1

This was Barty's 13th WTA singles title, and fifth of the year.

=== Men's doubles ===
- (Spain) Marcel Granollers / (Argentina) Horacio Zeballos def. (United States) Steve Johnson / (United States) Austin Krajicek, 7–6^{(7–5)}, 7–6^{(7–5)}

=== Women's doubles ===
- (Australia) Samantha Stosur / (China) Zhang Shuai def. (Canada) Gabriela Dabrowski / (Brazil) Luisa Stefani, 7–5, 6–3

== ATP singles main-draw entrants ==
=== Seeds ===
The following were the seeded players. Seedings were based on ATP rankings as of August 9, 2021. Rank and points before were as of August 16, 2021.

For the first time since the ATP Tour resumed from its pandemic suspension in August 2020, ATP rankings points were added and dropped per traditional methodology beginning 23 August 2021 (the rankings after the 2021 Western & Southern Open in Cincinnati). A player's current Western & Southern Open ATP ranking points (the greater from 2019 and 2020) dropped 23 August 2021 and were replaced with points earned by the player at this year's Western & Southern Open. Those new points would stay on a player's breakdown for 52 weeks, dropping 22 August 2022. Players who had Western & Southern Open points in their breakdown and did not compete in this year's event also had their existing Cincinnati ranking points drop on 23 August 2021.

Seed	Rank	Player	Points before	Points defending from 2019 or 2020	Points won	Points after	Status
1	2	(Russia) Daniil Medvedev	10,620	1,000	360	9,980	Semifinals lost to (Russia) Andrey Rublev [4]
2	3	(Greece) Stefanos Tsitsipas	8,350	360	360	8,350	Semifinals lost to (Germany) Alexander Zverev [3]
3	5	(Germany) Alexander Zverev	7,250	10	1000	8,240	Champion, defeated (Russia) Andrey Rublev [4]
4	7	(Russia) Andrey Rublev	6,005	205	600	6,400	Runner-up, lost to (Germany) Alexander Zverev [3]
5	8	(Italy) Matteo Berrettini	5,533	90	90	5,533	Third round lost to (Canada) Félix Auger-Aliassime [12]
6	10	(Canada) Denis Shapovalov	3,625	45+90^{†}	10+45	3,580^{^}	Second round lost to (France) Benoît Paire
7	12	(Spain) Pablo Carreño Busta	3,260	115	180	3,325	Quarterfinals lost to (Russia) Daniil Medvedev [1]
8	11	(Norway) Casper Ruud	3,310	35	180	3,455	Quarterfinals lost to (Germany) Alexander Zverev [3]
9	13	(Poland) Hubert Hurkacz	3,253	10+250^{†}	90+45	3,128	Third round lost to (Spain) Pablo Carreño Busta [7]
10	14	(Argentina) Diego Schwartzman	2,980	90	90	2,980	Third round lost to (Norway) Casper Ruud [8]
11	15	(Italy) Jannik Sinner	2,745	(40)^{‡}	45	2,750	Second round lost to (United States) John Isner
12	17	(Canada) Félix Auger-Aliassime	2,693	45	180	2,828	Quarterfinals lost to (Greece) Stefanos Tsitsipas [2]
13	16	(Spain) Roberto Bautista Agut	2,720	360	10	2,405^{^}	First round lost to (Bulgaria) Grigor Dimitrov
14	18	(Australia) Alex de Minaur	2,600	90	45	2,555	Second round lost to (France) Gaël Monfils
15	19	(Belgium) David Goffin	2,513	600	10	1,933^{^}	First round lost to (Argentina) Guido Pella [PR]
16	20	(Chile) Cristian Garín	2,475	10	10	2,510^{^}	First round lost to (United States) Tommy Paul [Q]

† The player is also defending points from the 2019 Winston-Salem Open, which was played during this calendar week in 2019.

‡ The player did not qualify for the tournament in 2019 or 2020. Accordingly, points for his 19th best result are deducted instead.

^ Because the 2021 tournament was non-mandatory, the player substituted his 19th best result in place of the points won in this tournament.

=== Other entrants ===
The following players received wild cards into the main singles draw:

- (United States) Mackenzie McDonald
- (United Kingdom) Andy Murray
- (United States) Brandon Nakashima
- (United States) Frances Tiafoe

The following player received entry using a protected ranking into the main singles draw:

- (Argentina) Guido Pella

The following players received entry from the singles qualifying draw:

- (Spain) Carlos Alcaraz
- (South Africa) Kevin Anderson
- (France) Richard Gasquet
- (United States) Marcos Giron
- (France) Corentin Moutet
- (Japan) Yoshihito Nishioka
- (United States) Tommy Paul

The following player received entry as a lucky loser:

- (Germany) Dominik Koepfer

=== Withdrawals ===
Before the tournament

- (Croatia) Borna Ćorić → replaced by (United States) Sebastian Korda
- (Serbia) Novak Djokovic → replaced by (Germany) Jan-Lennard Struff
- (Switzerland) Roger Federer → replaced by (Argentina) Federico Delbonis
- (France) Adrian Mannarino → replaced by (Serbia) Miomir Kecmanović
- (Australia) John Millman → replaced by (Germany) Dominik Koepfer
- (Spain) Rafael Nadal → replaced by (Argentina) Guido Pella
- (Japan) Kei Nishikori → replaced by (Serbia) Laslo Đere
- (Canada) Milos Raonic → replaced by (France) Benoît Paire
- (Austria) Dominic Thiem → replaced by (Germany) Dominik Koepfer
- (Switzerland) Stan Wawrinka → replaced by (Serbia) Dušan Lajović

== ATP doubles main-draw entrants ==
=== Seeds ===
Country	Player	Country	Player	Rank^{1}	Seed
CRO	Nikola Mektić	CRO	Mate Pavić	3	1
ESP	Marcel Granollers	ARG	Horacio Zeballos	12	2
COL	Juan Sebastián Cabal	COL	Robert Farah	13	3
USA	Rajeev Ram	GBR	Joe Salisbury	19	4
GER	Kevin Krawietz	ROU	Horia Tecău	37	5
AUS	John Peers	SVK	Filip Polášek	37	6
POL	Łukasz Kubot	BRA	Marcelo Melo	37	7
RSA	Raven Klaasen	JPN	Ben McLachlan	51	8

- Rankings are as of August 9, 2021.

=== Other entrants ===
The following pairs received wildcards into the doubles main draw:

- (United States) Steve Johnson / (United States) Austin Krajicek
- (United States) Nicholas Monroe / (United States) Frances Tiafoe
- ~~(Canada) Denis Shapovalov / (United States) Jack Sock~~

The following pairs received entry as an alternates:

- (El Salvador) Marcelo Arévalo / (Italy) Fabio Fognini
- (Russia) Aslan Karatsev / (Serbia) Dušan Lajović

=== Withdrawals ===
Before the tournament

- (Netherlands) Wesley Koolhof / (Netherlands) Jean-Julien Rojer → replaced by (Netherlands) Wesley Koolhof / (Germany) Jan-Lennard Struff
- (France) Nicolas Mahut / (France) Fabrice Martin → replaced by (Serbia) Filip Krajinović / (France) Fabrice Martin
- (United Kingdom) Jamie Murray / (Australia) Max Purcell → replaced by (Russia) Aslan Karatsev / (Serbia) Dušan Lajović
- (Canada) Denis Shapovalov / (United States) Jack Sock → replaced by (El Salvador) Marcelo Arévalo / (Italy) Fabio Fognini

== WTA singles main-draw entrants ==
=== Seeds ===
Country	Player	Rank^{1}	Seed
AUS	Ashleigh Barty	1	1
JPN	Naomi Osaka	2	2
BLR	Aryna Sabalenka	3	3
UKR	Elina Svitolina	5	4
CZE	Karolína Plíšková	6	5
POL	Iga Świątek	7	6
CAN	Bianca Andreescu	8	7
ESP	Garbiñe Muguruza	9	8
CZE	Barbora Krejčíková	10	9
SUI	Belinda Bencic	11	10
CZE	Petra Kvitová	12	11
ROU	Simona Halep	13	12
USA	Jennifer Brady	14	13
BLR	Victoria Azarenka	15	14
BEL	Elise Mertens	16	15
~~RUS~~	~~Anastasia Pavlyuchenkova~~	~~17~~	~~16~~

- ^{1} Rankings are as of August 9, 2021

=== Other entrants ===
The following players received wild cards into the main singles draw:

- (United States) Caty McNally
- (United States) Bernarda Pera
- (United States) Sloane Stephens
- (Australia) Samantha Stosur
- (Switzerland) Jil Teichmann

The following player received entry using a special exempt into the main singles draw:

- (Italy) Camila Giorgi

The following players received entry from the singles qualifying draw:

- (Canada) Leylah Annie Fernandez
- (France) Caroline Garcia
- (Chinese Taipei) Hsieh Su-wei
- (Italy) Jasmine Paolini
- (Russia) Liudmila Samsonova
- (Belarus) Aliaksandra Sasnovich
- (United Kingdom) Heather Watson
- (China) Zhang Shuai

The following player received entry as a lucky loser:

- (Sweden) Rebecca Peterson

=== Withdrawals ===
Before the tournament

- (United States) Sofia Kenin → replaced by (Poland) Magda Linette
- (Russia) Anastasia Pavlyuchenkova → replaced by (Sweden) Rebecca Peterson
- (United States) Serena Williams → replaced by (Ukraine) Dayana Yastremska

During the tournament

- (Romania) Simona Halep (right adductor injury)

=== Retirements ===
- (Spain) Paula Badosa (right shoulder injury)
- (United States) Jennifer Brady (right knee injury)
- (United States) Danielle Collins (exhaustion)
- (Czech Republic) Petra Kvitová (stomach issue)
- (Czech Republic) Karolína Muchová (abdominal injury)

== WTA doubles main-draw entrants ==
=== Seeds ===
Country	Player	Country	Player	Rank^{1}	Seed
TPE	Hsieh Su-wei	BEL	Elise Mertens	3	1
CZE	Barbora Krejčíková	CZE	Kateřina Siniaková	11	2
JPN	Shuko Aoyama	JPN	Ena Shibahara	18	3
USA	Nicole Melichar	NED	Demi Schuurs	23	4
CHI	Alexa Guarachi	USA	Desirae Krawczyk	33	5
CAN	Gabriela Dabrowski	BRA	Luisa Stefani	37	6
TPE	Chan Hao-ching	TPE	Latisha Chan	40	7
CRO	Darija Jurak	SLO	Andreja Klepač	44	8

- Rankings are as of August 9, 2021.

=== Other entrants ===
The following pairs received wildcards into the doubles main draw:

- (Poland) Magda Linette / (United States) Bernarda Pera
- (United States) Emma Navarro / (United States) Peyton Stearns

The following pairs received entry using protected rankings:

- (Kazakhstan) Anna Danilina / (Kazakhstan) Yaroslava Shvedova
- (Tunisia) Ons Jabeur / (India) Sania Mirza
- (Kazakhstan) Galina Voskoboeva / (Russia) Vera Zvonareva

=== Withdrawals ===
Before the tournament

- (United States) Sofia Kenin / (Latvia) Jeļena Ostapenko → replaced by (Latvia) Jeļena Ostapenko / (Switzerland) Jil Teichmann
- (Russia) Veronika Kudermetova / (Russia) Elena Vesnina → replaced by (Russia) Anna Blinkova / (Belarus) Aliaksandra Sasnovich

== Points and prize money ==
=== Point distribution ===
Event	W	F	SF	QF	Round of 16	Round of 32	Round of 64	Q	Q2	Q1
Men's singles	1000	600	360	180	90	45	10	25	16	0
Men's doubles	1000	600	360	180	90	0	—N/a	—N/a	—N/a	—N/a
Women's singles	900	585	350	190	105	60	1	30	20	1
Women's doubles	900	585	350	190	105	5	—N/a	—N/a	—N/a	—N/a

=== Prize money ===
Event	W	F	SF	QF	Round of 16	Round of 32	Round of 64	Q2	Q1
Men's singles	$654,815	$354,720	$197,710	$116,655	$68,325	$41,500	$23,650	$12,595	$6,655
Women's singles	$255,220	$188,945	$100,250	$47,820	$24,200	$15,330	$12,385	$7,258	$3,745
Men's doubles*	$159,030	$102,000	$63,960	$40,710	$23,260	$12,910	—N/a	—N/a	—N/a
Women's doubles*	$77,200	$50,700	$31,700	$15,900	$10,020	$7,490	—N/a	—N/a	—N/a

_{*per team}
