= 2021 Mutua Madrid Open =

- Date: 2−9 May (men); 29 April – 8 May (women)
- Edition: 19th (men); 12th (women)
- Category: ATP Tour Masters 1000 (men); WTA 1000 (women)
- Draw: 56S / 28D (men); 64S / 30D (women)
- Prize money: €3,226,325 (men) €2,549,105 (women)
- Surface: Clay / outdoor
- Location: Madrid, Spain
- Venue: Park Manzanares

Champions

Men's singles
- (Germany) Alexander Zverev

Women's singles
- (Belarus) Aryna Sabalenka

Men's doubles
- (Spain) Marcel Granollers / (Argentina) Horacio Zeballos

Women's doubles
- (Czech Republic) Barbora Krejčíková / (Czech Republic) Kateřina Siniaková
← 2019 ·	Madrid Open	· 2022 →

The 2021 Madrid Open (sponsored by Mutua) was a professional tennis tournament played on outdoor clay courts at the Park Manzanares in Madrid, Spain from 29 April – 9 May 2021. It was the 19th edition of the tournament on the ATP Tour and 12th on the WTA Tour. It was classified as an ATP Tour Masters 1000 event on the 2021 ATP Tour and a WTA 1000 event on the 2021 WTA Tour.

The tournament's 2020 edition, which was originally scheduled for 1 to 10 May 2020, and that was later rescheduled to 12 to 20 September 2020 was effectively cancelled on 4 August 2020 after an onset of the COVID-19 pandemic in Spain.

Ion Țiriac, the event owner, eventually sold the tournament at the end of the year to IMG for approximately $283 Million.

== Finals ==
=== Men's singles ===
- (Germany) Alexander Zverev def. (Italy) Matteo Berrettini, 6–7^{(8–10)}, 6–4, 6–3.

=== Women's singles ===
- (Belarus) Aryna Sabalenka def. (Australia) Ashleigh Barty, 6–0, 3–6, 6–4

=== Men's doubles ===
- (Spain) Marcel Granollers / (Argentina) Horacio Zeballos def. (Croatia) Nikola Mektić / (Croatia) Mate Pavić, 1–6, 6–3, [10–8]

=== Women's doubles ===
- (Czech Republic) Barbora Krejčíková / (Czech Republic) Kateřina Siniaková def. (Canada) Gabriela Dabrowski / (Netherlands) Demi Schuurs, 6–4, 6–3

== Points and prize money ==
=== Point distribution ===
Event	W	F	SF	QF	Round of 16	Round of 32	Round of 64	Q	Q2	Q1
Men's singles	1000	600	360	180	90	45	10	25	16	0
Men's doubles	1000	600	360	180	90	10	—	—	—	—
Women's singles	1000	650	390	215	120	65	10	30	20	2
Women's doubles	1000	650	390	215	120	10	—	—	—	—

=== Prize money ===
Event	W	F	SF	QF	Round of 16	Round of 32	Round of 64	Q2	Q1
Men's singles	€315,160	€188,280	€106,690	€58,370	€36,400	€22,720	€15,060	€7,655	€4,080
Women's singles	€315,160	€188,280	€106,690	€58,370	€34,048	€20,000	€12,655	€4,025	€2,600
Men's doubles*	€62,760	€43,940	€30,120	€20,400	€13,810	€9,410	—	—	—
Women's doubles*	€62,760	€43,940	€30,120	€20,400	€13,810	€9,410	—	—	—

_{*per team}
