= 2021 Monte-Carlo Masters =

- Date: 11–18 April
- Edition: 114th
- Category: Masters 1000
- Draw: 56S / 28D
- Prize money: €2,460,585
- Surface: Clay / outdoor
- Location: Roquebrune-Cap-Martin, France (billed as Monte Carlo, Monaco)
- Venue: Monte Carlo Country Club

Champions

Singles
- (Greece) Stefanos Tsitsipas

Doubles
- (Croatia) Nikola Mektić / (Croatia) Mate Pavić
- Monte-Carlo Masters

The 2021 Monte-Carlo Masters (also known as the Rolex Monte-Carlo Masters for sponsorship reasons) was a tennis tournament for male professional players played on outdoor clay courts. It was the 114th edition of the annual Monte Carlo Masters tournament. It took place at the Monte Carlo Country Club in Roquebrune-Cap-Martin, France (though billed as Monte Carlo, Monaco) as a part of the Masters 1000 event on the 2021 ATP Tour.

The tournament's 2020 edition, which was scheduled for 13–19 April 2020, was cancelled due to the onset of the COVID-19 pandemic in France. Due to COVID-19 restrictions, there were no spectators in all stadiums during the 2021 tournament.

== Champions ==
=== Singles ===
- (Greece) Stefanos Tsitsipas def. (Russia) Andrey Rublev, 6–3, 6–3

=== Doubles ===
- (Croatia) Nikola Mektić / (Croatia) Mate Pavić def. (United Kingdom) Dan Evans / (United Kingdom) Neal Skupski, 6–3, 4–6, [10–7]

== Points and prize money ==
=== Points ===
Because the Monte Carlo Masters is the non-mandatory Masters 1000 event, special rules regarding points distribution are in place. The Monte Carlo Masters counts as one of a player's 500 level tournaments, while distributing Masters 1000 points.

Event	W	F	SF	QF	Round of 16	Round of 32	Round of 64	Q	Q2	Q1
Men's singles	1,000	600	360	180	90	45	10	25	16	0
Men's doubles	1,000	600	360	180	90	0	—N/a	—N/a	—N/a	—N/a

=== Prize money ===
Event	W	F	SF	QF	Round of 16	Round of 32	Round of 64	Q2	Q1
Singles	€251,085	€150,000	€85,000	€46,500	€29,000	€18,100	€12,000	€6,100	€3,250
Doubles*	€50,000	€35,000	€24,000	€16,250	€11,000	€7,500	—N/a	—N/a	—N/a

_{*per team}

== Singles main-draw entrants ==
=== Seeds ===
Country	Player	Rank^{1}	Seed
SRB	Novak Djokovic	1	1
~~RUS~~	~~Daniil Medvedev~~	~~2~~	~~2~~
ESP	Rafael Nadal	3	3
GRE	Stefanos Tsitsipas	5	4
GER	Alexander Zverev	6	5
RUS	Andrey Rublev	8	6
ARG	Diego Schwartzman	9	7
ITA	Matteo Berrettini	10	8
ESP	Roberto Bautista Agut	11	9
~~FRA~~	~~Gaël Monfils~~	~~13~~	~~10~~
BEL	David Goffin	14	11
ESP	Pablo Carreño Busta	15	12
POL	Hubert Hurkacz	16	13
BUL	Grigor Dimitrov	17	14
ITA	Fabio Fognini	18	15
CHI	Cristian Garín	20	16

- Rankings are as of 5 April 2021

=== Other entrants ===
The following players received wildcards into the main draw:

- (Monaco) Lucas Catarina
- (Italy) Lorenzo Musetti
- (France) Lucas Pouille
- (Denmark) Holger Rune

The following players received entry via the qualifying draw:

- (Italy) Salvatore Caruso
- (Italy) Marco Cecchinato
- (Argentina) Federico Delbonis
- (Italy) Thomas Fabbiano
- (Germany) Dominik Koepfer
- (Australia) Alexei Popyrin
- (Italy) Stefano Travaglia

The following players received entry as lucky losers:

- (Argentina) Juan Ignacio Londero
- (Spain) Pedro Martínez

=== Withdrawals ===
Before the tournament

- (Croatia) Borna Ćorić → replaced by (United States) Tommy Paul
- (United States) John Isner → replaced by (Spain) Pablo Andújar
- (Russia) Daniil Medvedev → replaced by (Argentina) Juan Ignacio Londero
- (France) Gaël Monfils → replaced by (Spain) Pedro Martínez
- (Japan) Kei Nishikori → replaced by (Serbia) Laslo Đere
- (United States) Reilly Opelka → replaced by (France) Jérémy Chardy
- (Austria) Dominic Thiem → replaced by (Spain) Alejandro Davidovich Fokina
- (Switzerland) Stan Wawrinka → replaced by (Australia) Jordan Thompson

=== Retirements ===
- (Georgia (country)) Nikoloz Basilashvili
- (Spain) Alejandro Davidovich Fokina
- (Spain) Pedro Martínez

== Doubles main-draw entrants ==
=== Seeds ===
Country	Player	Country	Player	Rank^{1}	Seed
COL	Juan Sebastián Cabal	COL	Robert Farah	5	1
CRO	Nikola Mektić	CRO	Mate Pavić	5	2
CRO	Ivan Dodig	SVK	Filip Polášek	17	3
ESP	Marcel Granollers	ARG	Horacio Zeballos	20	4
USA	Rajeev Ram	GBR	Joe Salisbury	23	5
NED	Wesley Koolhof	POL	Łukasz Kubot	26	6
FRA	Pierre-Hugues Herbert	FRA	Nicolas Mahut	29	7
GER	Kevin Krawietz	ROU	Horia Tecău	42	8

- Rankings are as of 5 April 2021.

=== Other entrants ===
The following pairs received wildcards into the doubles main draw:

- (Monaco) Romain Arneodo / (Monaco) Hugo Nys
- (Italy) Simone Bolelli / (Italy) Jannik Sinner
- (Greece) Petros Tsitsipas / (Greece) Stefanos Tsitsipas

The following pairs received entry into the doubles main draw as alternates:

- (Kazakhstan) Alexander Bublik / (Serbia) Dušan Lajović
- (Uruguay) Ariel Behar / (Ecuador) Gonzalo Escobar

=== Withdrawals ===
Before the tournament

- (Germany) Jan-Lennard Struff / (Austria) Dominic Thiem → replaced by (Kazakhstan) Alexander Bublik / (Serbia) Dušan Lajović
- (United Kingdom) Jamie Murray / (Brazil) Bruno Soares → replaced by (United Kingdom) Jamie Murray / (Germany) Jan-Lennard Struff
- (Germany) Tim Pütz / (Germany) Alexander Zverev → replaced by (Uruguay) Ariel Behar / (Ecuador) Gonzalo Escobar

=== Retirements ===
- (Monaco) Romain Arneodo / (Monaco) Hugo Nys
