= 2021 ATP Cup =

- Date: 2–7 February
- Edition: 2nd
- Category: ATP Cup
- Draw: 12 teams
- Prize money: $4,500,000
- Surface: Hard
- Location: Melbourne, Australia
- Venue: Melbourne Park

Champions
- Russia
- ATP Cup

The 2021 ATP Cup was the second edition of the ATP Cup, an international outdoor hard court men's team tennis tournament held by the Association of Tennis Professionals (ATP). It was held with 12 teams at Melbourne Park in Australia, from 2 to 7 February 2021.

It was originally supposed to take place with 24 teams in Brisbane, Perth and Sydney from 1 to 10 January 2021, but was changed due to the impact of the COVID-19 pandemic.

Following a case of COVID-19 in the tournament's quarantine hotel, all matches scheduled for 4 February have been suspended.

Team Serbia was the defending champion, but got eliminated in the group stage. Team Russia won the tournament, defeating Italy 2–0 in the final.

== ATP ranking points ==
Type	Player ranked	Round	Points per win vs. opponent ranked						
Type	Player ranked	Round	No. 1–10	No. 11–20	No. 21–30	No. 31–50	No. 51–100	No. 101–250	No. 251+
Singles	No. 1–250	Final	220	180	140	100	75	45	30
Singles	No. 1–250	Semifinals	150	130	100	70	45	30	20
Singles	No. 1–250	Group stage	75	65	50	35	25	20	15
Singles	No. 251+	Final	55					45	30
Singles	No. 251+	Semifinals	45					30	20
Singles	No. 251+	Group stage	25					15	10
Doubles	Any	Final	100						
Doubles	Any	Semifinals	75						
Doubles	Any	Group stage	50						

- Maximum 500 points for undefeated singles player, 250 points for doubles.

== Entries ==
11 countries qualified based on the ATP ranking of its highest-ranked singles player on 4 January 2021, and their commitment to play at the event. Host country Australia received a wild card. Switzerland withdrew after world number 5 Roger Federer was ruled unfit to compete at the event due to a knee injury.

#	Nation	No. 1 player	Rank	No. 2 player	Rank	No. 3 player	No. 4 player	Captain
1	Serbia	Novak Djokovic	1	Dušan Lajović	26	Filip Krajinović	Nikola Ćaćić	Viktor Troicki
2	Spain	Rafael Nadal	2	Roberto Bautista Agut	13	Pablo Carreño Busta	Marcel Granollers	Pepe Vendrell
3	Austria	Dominic Thiem	3	Dennis Novak	100	Philipp Oswald	Tristan-Samuel Weissborn	Wolfgang Thiem
4	Russia	Daniil Medvedev	4	Andrey Rublev	8	Aslan Karatsev	Evgeny Donskoy	Evgeny Donskoy
5	Greece	Stefanos Tsitsipas	6	Michail Pervolarakis	462	Markos Kalovelonis	Petros Tsitsipas	Apostolos Tsitsipas
6	Germany	Alexander Zverev	7	Jan-Lennard Struff	37	Kevin Krawietz	Andreas Mies	Mischa Zverev
7	Argentina	Diego Schwartzman	9	Guido Pella	44	Horacio Zeballos	Máximo González	Diego Schwartzman
8	Italy	Matteo Berrettini	10	Fabio Fognini	17	Simone Bolelli	Andrea Vavassori	Vincenzo Santopadre
9	Japan	Kei Nishikori	10 (PR)	Yoshihito Nishioka	57	Ben McLachlan	Toshihide Matsui	Max Mirnyi
10	France	Gaël Monfils	11	Benoît Paire	28	Nicolas Mahut	Édouard Roger-Vasselin	Richard Ruckelshausen
11	Canada	Denis Shapovalov	12	Milos Raonic	14	Steven Diez	Peter Polansky	Peter Polansky
12 (WC)	Australia	Alex de Minaur	23	John Millman	38	John Peers	Luke Saville	Lleyton Hewitt

- Rankings are as of 1 February 2021.

== Group stage ==
The 12 teams were divided into four groups of three teams each in a round-robin format. The winners of each group will qualify for the semifinals.

Qualified for the knockout stage
Eliminated

=== Overview ===
T = Ties, M = Matches, S = Sets

Group	First place				Second place				Third place			
Group	Nation	T	M	S	Nation	T	M	S	Nation	T	M	S
A	Germany	2–0	4–2	10–7	Serbia	1–1	3–3	8–7	Canada	0–2	2–4	5–9
B	Spain	1–1	4–2	8–3	Greece	1–1	3–3	5–6	Australia	1–1	2–4	5–9
C	Italy	2–0	4–2	8–4	France	1–1	3–3	6–4	Austria	0–2	2–4	2–8
D	Russia	2–0	4–2	9–4	Argentina	1–1	4–2	8–5	Japan	0–2	1–5	3–11

=== Group A ===
Pos.	Country	Ties	Matches	Sets	S %	Games	G %
1	Germany	2–0	4–2	10–7	58.8	88–87	50.3
2	Serbia	1–1	3–3	8–7	53.3	80–75	51.6
3	Canada	0–2	2–4	5–9	35.7	75–81	48.1

==== Serbia vs. Canada ====
Serbia
2

2 February 2021

Canada
1

			1	2	3
1	(Serbia) (Canada)	Dušan Lajović; Milos Raonic	3; 6	4; 6
2	(Serbia) (Canada)	Novak Djokovic; Denis Shapovalov	7; 5	7; 5
3	(Serbia) (Canada)	Novak Djokovic / Filip Krajinović; Milos Raonic / Denis Shapovalov	7; 5	7^{7} 6^{4}

==== Germany vs. Canada ====
Germany
2

3 February 2021

Canada
1

			1	2	3
1	(Germany) (Canada)	Jan-Lennard Struff; Milos Raonic	7^{7} 6^{4}	7^{7} 6^{2}
2	(Germany) (Canada)	Alexander Zverev; Denis Shapovalov	6^{5} 7^{7}	6; 3	7^{7} 6^{4}
3	(Germany) (Canada)	Kevin Krawietz / Jan-Lennard Struff; Steven Diez / Peter Polansky	6^{4} 7^{7}	7^{8} 6^{6}	3; 10

==== Serbia vs. Germany ====
Serbia
1

5 February 2021

Germany
2

			1	2	3
1	(Serbia) (Germany)	Dušan Lajović; Jan-Lennard Struff	6; 3	3; 6	4; 6
2	(Serbia) (Germany)	Novak Djokovic; Alexander Zverev	6^{3} 7^{7}	6; 2	7; 5
3	(Serbia) (Germany)	Nikola Ćaćić / Novak Djokovic; Jan-Lennard Struff / Alexander Zverev	6^{4} 7^{7}	7; 5	[7] [10]

=== Group B ===
Pos.	Country	Ties	Matches	Sets	S %	Games	G %
1	Spain	1–1	4–2	8–3	72.7	63–50	55.8
2	Greece	1–1	3–3	5–6	45.5	48–53	47.5
3	Australia	1–1	2–4	5–9	35.7	60–68	46.9

==== Spain vs. Australia ====
Spain
3

2 February 2021

Australia
0

			1	2	3
1	(Spain) (Australia)	Pablo Carreño Busta; John Millman	6; 2	6; 4
2	(Spain) (Australia)	Roberto Bautista Agut; Alex de Minaur	4; 6	6; 4	6; 4
3	(Spain) (Australia)	Pablo Carreño Busta / Marcel Granollers; John Peers / Luke Saville	6; 4	7; 5

==== Greece vs. Australia ====
Greece
1

3 February 2021

Australia
2

			1	2	3
1	(Greece) (Australia)	Michail Pervolarakis; John Millman	2; 6	3; 6
2	(Greece) (Australia)	Stefanos Tsitsipas; Alex de Minaur	6; 3	7; 5
3	(Greece) (Australia)	Michail Pervolarakis / Stefanos Tsitsipas; John Peers / Luke Saville	3; 6	6; 4	5; 10

==== Spain vs. Greece ====
Spain
1

5 February 2021

Greece
2

			1	2	3
1	(Spain) (Greece)	Pablo Carreño Busta; Michail Pervolarakis	6; 3	6; 4
2	(Spain) (Greece)	Roberto Bautista Agut; Stefanos Tsitsipas	5; 7	5; 7
3	(Spain) (Greece)	Pablo Carreño Busta / Marcel Granollers; Markos Kalovelonis / Stefanos Tsitsipas	0; 1			retired

Note: By ATP Cup rules retired match is not counting into percentage of sets and games.

=== Group C ===
Pos.	Country	Ties	Matches	Sets	S %	Games	G %
1	Italy	2–0	4–2	8–4	66.7	61–48	56.0
2	France	1–1	3–3	6–4	60.0	50–46	52.1
3	Austria	0–2	2–4	2–8	20.0	37–54	40.7

==== Austria vs. Italy ====
Austria
1

2 February 2021

Italy
2

			1	2	3
1	(Austria) (Italy)	Dennis Novak; Fabio Fognini	6; 3	6; 2
2	(Austria) (Italy)	Dominic Thiem; Matteo Berrettini	2; 6	4; 6
3	(Austria) (Italy)	Dennis Novak / Dominic Thiem; Matteo Berrettini / Fabio Fognini	1; 6	4; 6

==== Italy vs. France ====
Italy
2

3 February 2021

France
1

			1	2	3
1	(Italy) (France)	Fabio Fognini; Benoît Paire	6; 1	7^{7} 6^{2}
2	(Italy) (France)	Matteo Berrettini; Gaël Monfils	6; 4	6; 2
3	(Italy) (France)	Simone Bolelli / Andrea Vavassori; Nicolas Mahut / Édouard Roger-Vasselin	3; 6	4; 6

==== Austria vs. France ====
Austria
1

5 February 2021

France
2

			1	2	3
1	(Austria) (France)	Dennis Novak; Nicolas Mahut	6^{2} 7^{7}	2; 6
2	(Austria) (France)	Dominic Thiem; Benoît Paire	6; 1	0; 0		retired
3	(Austria) (France)	Philipp Oswald / Tristan-Samuel Weissborn; Nicolas Mahut / Édouard Roger-Vasselin	3; 6	3; 6

Note: By ATP Cup rules retired match is not counting into percentage of sets and games.

=== Group D ===
Pos.	Country	Ties	Matches	Sets	S %	Games	G %
1	Russia	2–0	4–2	9–4	69.2	68–45	60.2
2	Argentina	1–1	4–2	8–5	61.5	67–56	54.5
3	Japan	0–2	1–5	3–11	21.4	42–76	35.6

==== Russia vs. Argentina ====
Russia
2

2 February 2021

Argentina
1

			1	2	3
1	(Russia) (Argentina)	Andrey Rublev; Guido Pella	6; 1	6; 2
2	(Russia) (Argentina)	Daniil Medvedev; Diego Schwartzman	7; 5	6; 3
3	(Russia) (Argentina)	Aslan Karatsev / Andrey Rublev; Máximo González / Horacio Zeballos	4; 6	6^{4} 7^{7}

==== Russia vs. Japan ====
Russia
2

3 February 2021

Japan
1

			1	2	3
1	(Russia) (Japan)	Andrey Rublev; Yoshihito Nishioka	6; 1	6; 3
2	(Russia) (Japan)	Daniil Medvedev; Kei Nishikori	6; 2	6; 4
3	(Russia) (Japan)	Evgeny Donskoy / Aslan Karatsev; Ben McLachlan / Yoshihito Nishioka	6; 4	3; 6	10; 12

==== Argentina vs. Japan ====
Argentina
3

6 February 2021

Japan
0

			1	2	3
1	(Argentina) (Japan)	Guido Pella; Yoshihito Nishioka	6; 3	7^{7} 6^{4}
2	(Argentina) (Japan)	Diego Schwartzman; Kei Nishikori	6; 1	6^{4} 7^{7}	6; 0
3	(Argentina) (Japan)	Máximo González / Horacio Zeballos; Toshihide Matsui / Ben McLachlan	6; 2	6; 2

== Knockout stage ==
=== Bracket ===
Semi-finals
6	Germany	1
4	Russia	2
8	Italy	3
2	Spain	0

Final
4	Russia	2
8	Italy	0

=== Semi-finals ===
==== Germany vs. Russia ====
Germany
1

6 February 2021

Russia
2

			1	2	3
1	(Germany) (Russia)	Jan-Lennard Struff; Andrey Rublev	6; 3	1; 6	2; 6
2	(Germany) (Russia)	Alexander Zverev; Daniil Medvedev	6; 3	3; 6	5; 7
3	(Germany) (Russia)	Kevin Krawietz / Jan-Lennard Struff; Evgeny Donskoy / Aslan Karatsev	6; 3	7^{7} 6^{2}

==== Italy vs. Spain ====
Italy
3

6 February 2021

Spain
0

			1	2	3
1	(Italy) (Spain)	Fabio Fognini; Pablo Carreño Busta	6; 2	1; 6	6; 4
2	(Italy) (Spain)	Matteo Berrettini; Roberto Bautista Agut	6; 3	7; 5
3	(Italy) (Spain)	Simone Bolelli / Andrea Vavassori; Pablo Carreño Busta / Marcel Granollers				w/o

=== Final ===
==== Russia vs. Italy ====
Russia
2

7 February 2021

Italy
0

			1	2	3
1	(Russia) (Italy)	Andrey Rublev; Fabio Fognini	6; 1	6; 2
2	(Russia) (Italy)	Daniil Medvedev; Matteo Berrettini	6; 4	6; 2
3	(Russia) (Italy)	Evgeny Donskoy / Aslan Karatsev; Simone Bolelli / Andrea Vavassori				not played
