= 2021 ATP Tour =

Men's tennis circuit

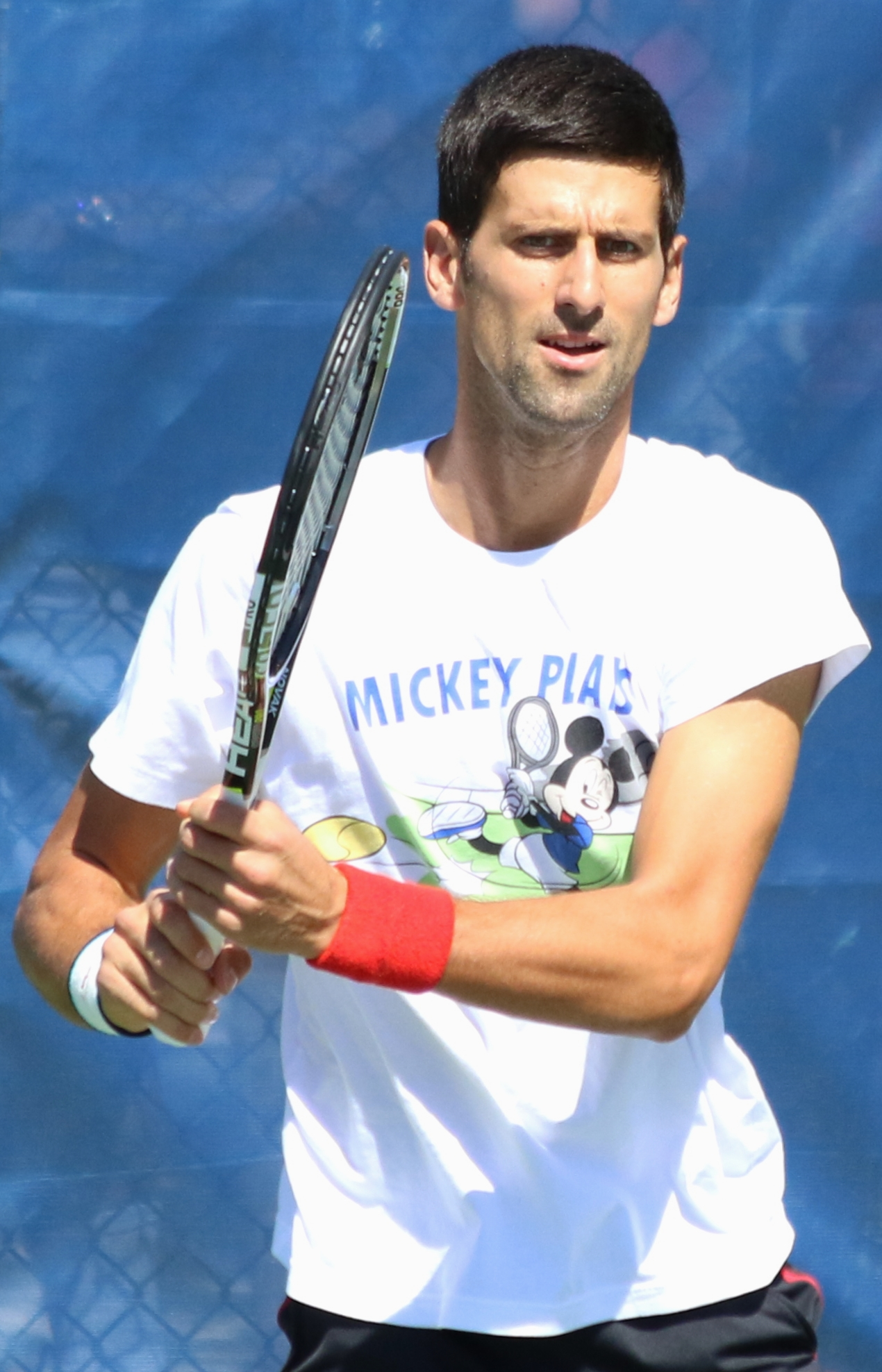
- Novak Djokovic finished the year as world No. 1 for a record-breaking seventh time. He won five tournaments during the season, including three majors at the Australian Open, the French Open (completing the double career Grand Slam), and the Wimbledon Championships. He also won a Masters 1000 title and finished runner-up at the fourth major, the US Open.

Details
- Duration: 7 Jan 2021 – 5 Dec 2021
- Edition: 52nd
- Tournaments: 68
- Categories: Grand Slam (4); Summer Olympic Games; ATP Finals; ATP Masters 1000 (8); ATP Cup; ATP 500 (9); ATP 250 (39); Next Gen Finals; Davis Cup; Laver Cup

Achievements (singles)
- Most titles: (Germany) Alexander Zverev (6)
- Most finals: (Serbia) Novak Djokovic (Russia) Daniil Medvedev (7)
- Prize money leader: (Serbia) Novak Djokovic ($9,100,547)
- Points leader: (Serbia) Novak Djokovic (9,370)

Awards
- Player of the year: (Serbia) Novak Djokovic
- Doubles team of the year: (Croatia) Mate Pavić (Croatia) Nikola Mektić
- Most improved player of the year: (Russia) Aslan Karatsev
- Newcomer of the year: (United States) Jenson Brooksby
- Comeback player of the year: (United States) Mackenzie McDonald

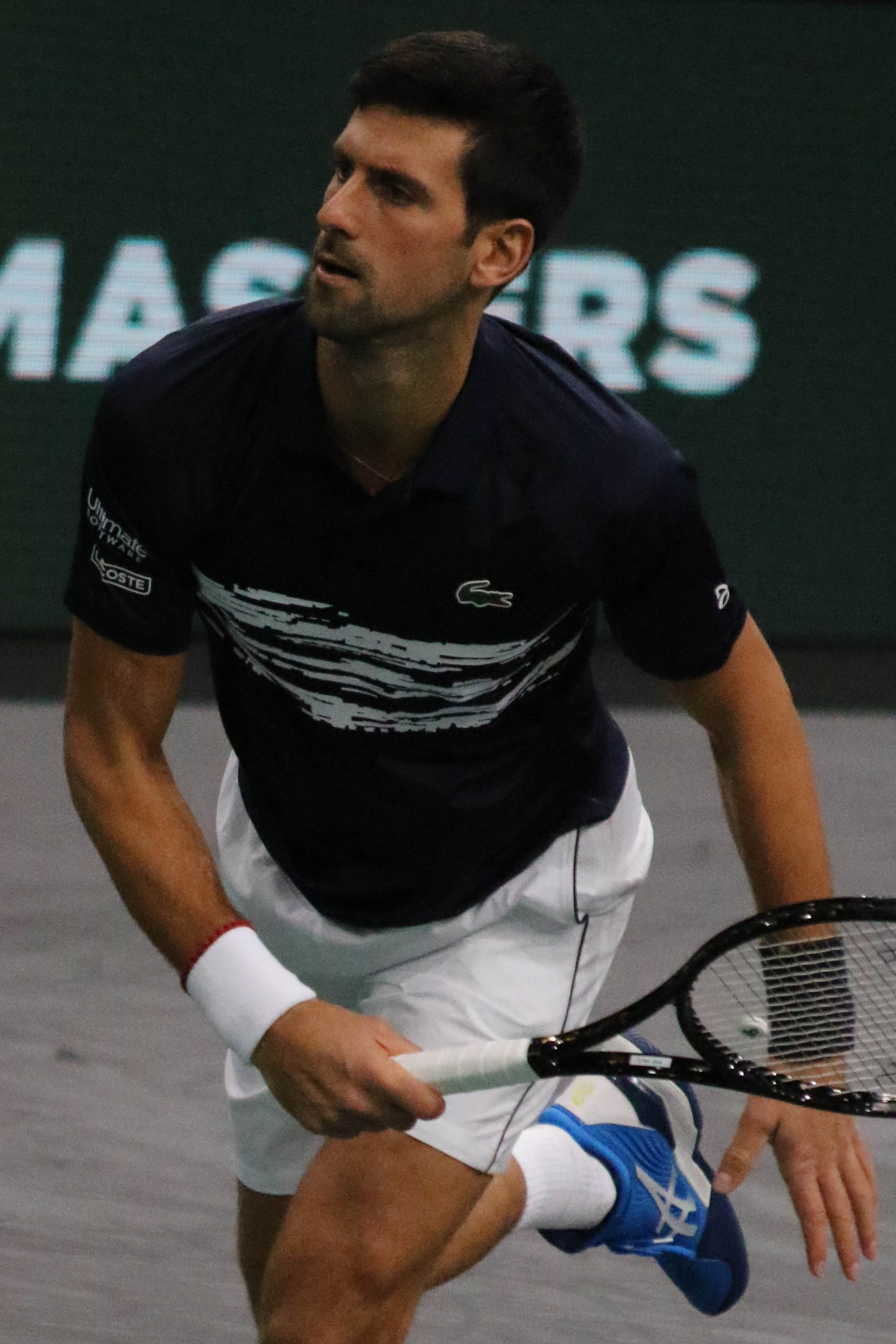
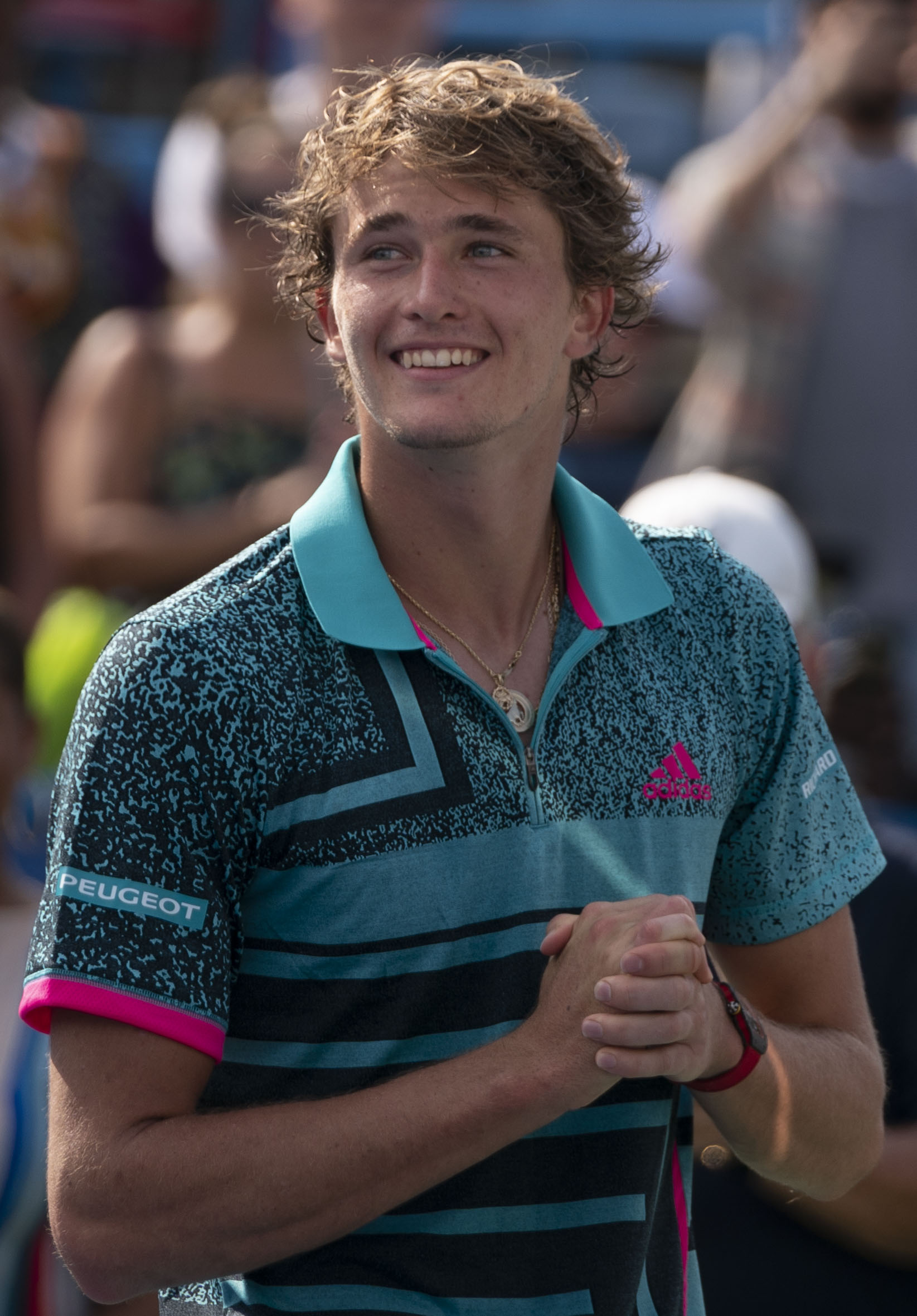
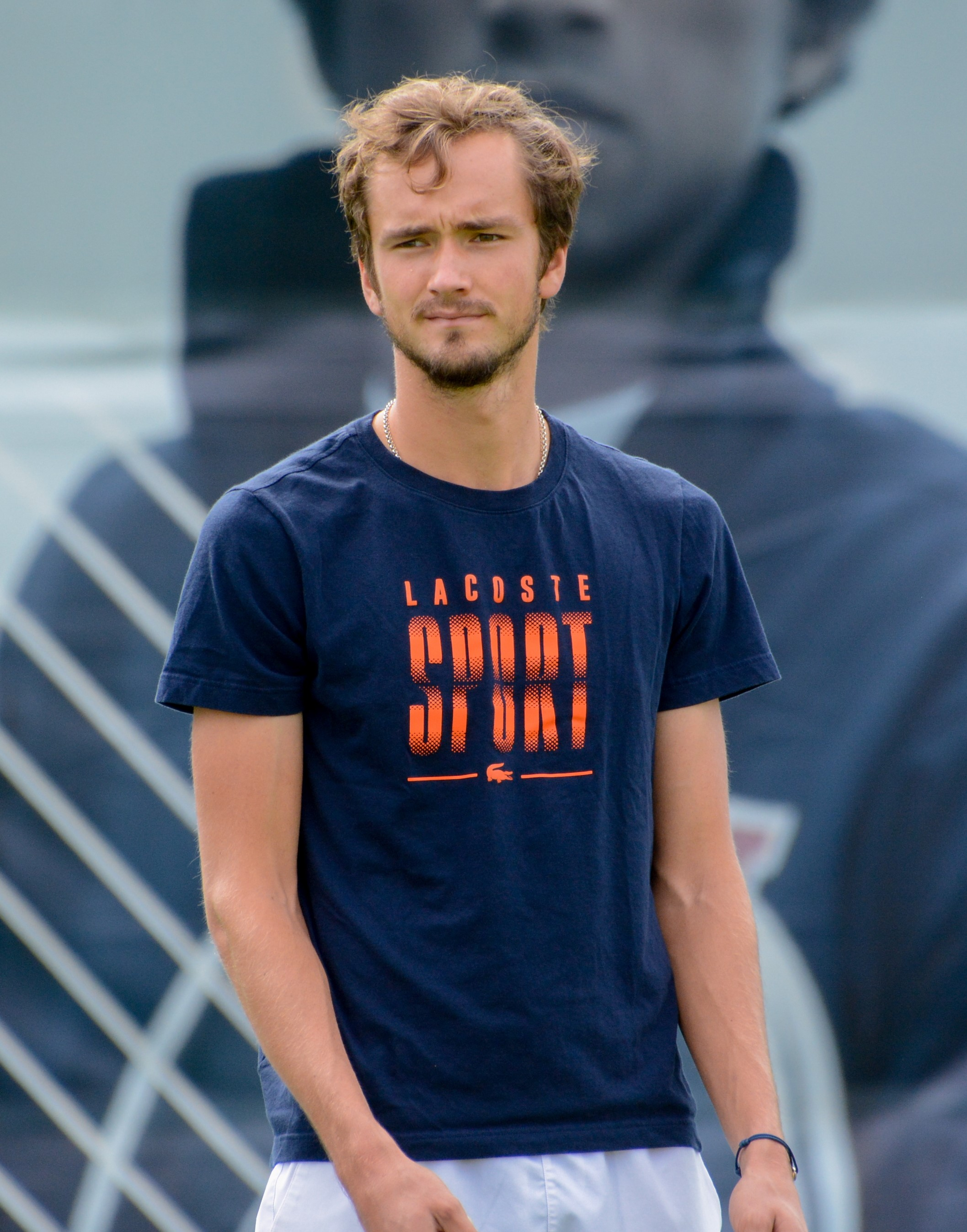
Novak Djokovic won a record-extending ninth Australian Open and 18th major overall, defeating Daniil Medvedev in the final. Djokovic also defeated Stefanos Tsitsipas to win the French Open, becoming the first man in the Open Era to complete the double career Grand Slam. Djokovic then defeated Matteo Berrettini to win a sixth Wimbledon title and record-equalling 20th major title overall, tying Roger Federer and Rafael Nadal's all-time record. Alexander Zverev won the gold medal at the Tokyo Olympics, defeating Karen Khachanov in the final. Daniil Medvedev defeated Djokovic to win his first major title at the US Open, denying Djokovic the Grand Slam.

The 2021 ATP Tour was the global elite men's professional tennis circuit organised by the Association of Tennis Professionals (ATP) for the 2021 tennis season. The 2021 ATP Tour calendar comprised the Grand Slam tournaments (supervised by the International Tennis Federation (ITF)), the ATP Finals, the ATP Masters 1000, the ATP Cup, the ATP 500 series and the ATP 250 series. Also included in the 2021 calendar were the Davis Cup (organised by the ITF), the Summer Olympics in Tokyo (rescheduled from 2020), Next Gen ATP Finals, Laver Cup (postponed from 2020), none of which distributed ranking points. During this year also, several tournaments were cancelled or postponed due to the COVID-19 pandemic on both the ATP and WTA tours, thus making the season still pandemic-affected.

== Schedule ==
This is the complete schedule of events on the 2021 calendar.

Key
Grand Slam
ATP Finals
ATP Masters
Summer Olympics
ATP 500
ATP 250
Team events

=== January ===
Week	Tournament	Champions	Runners-up	Semifinalists	Quarterfinalists
4 Jan; 11 Jan	Delray Beach Open; Delray Beach, United States; ATP 250; Hard – $418,195 – 28S/16Q/16D; Singles – Doubles	(Poland) Hubert Hurkacz; 6–3, 6–3	(United States) Sebastian Korda	(United States) Christian Harrison (United Kingdom) Cameron Norrie	(Italy) Gianluca Mager (Ecuador) Roberto Quiroz (United States) Frances Tiafoe (United States) John Isner
4 Jan; 11 Jan	Delray Beach Open; Delray Beach, United States; ATP 250; Hard – $418,195 – 28S/16Q/16D; Singles – Doubles	(Uruguay) Ariel Behar (Ecuador) Gonzalo Escobar; 6–7^{(5–7)}, 7–6^{(7–4)}, [10–4]	(United States) Christian Harrison (United States) Ryan Harrison	(United States) Christian Harrison (United Kingdom) Cameron Norrie	(Italy) Gianluca Mager (Ecuador) Roberto Quiroz (United States) Frances Tiafoe (United States) John Isner
4 Jan; 11 Jan	Antalya Open; Antalya, Turkey; ATP 250; Hard – €361,800 – 32S/24Q/16D; Singles – Doubles	(Australia) Alex de Minaur; 2–0, ret.	(Kazakhstan) Alexander Bublik	(France) Jérémy Chardy (Belgium) David Goffin	(Italy) Matteo Berrettini (Germany) Jan-Lennard Struff (Georgia (country)) Nikoloz Basilashvili (Italy) Stefano Travaglia
4 Jan; 11 Jan	Antalya Open; Antalya, Turkey; ATP 250; Hard – €361,800 – 32S/24Q/16D; Singles – Doubles	(Croatia) Nikola Mektić (Croatia) Mate Pavić; 6–2, 6–4	(Croatia) Ivan Dodig (Slovakia) Filip Polášek	(France) Jérémy Chardy (Belgium) David Goffin	(Italy) Matteo Berrettini (Germany) Jan-Lennard Struff (Georgia (country)) Nikoloz Basilashvili (Italy) Stefano Travaglia

=== February ===
Week	Tournament	Champions	Runners-up	Semifinalists	Quarterfinalists
1 Feb	ATP Cup; Melbourne, Australia; Hard – $4,500,000 – 12 teams	Russia; 2–0	Italy	Germany; Spain	
1 Feb	Great Ocean Road Open; Melbourne, Australia; ATP 250; Hard – $382,575 – 56S/24D; Singles – Doubles	(Italy) Jannik Sinner; 7–6^{(7–4)}, 6–4	(Italy) Stefano Travaglia	(Brazil) Thiago Monteiro (Russia) Karen Khachanov	(Australia) Jordan Thompson (Poland) Hubert Hurkacz (Serbia) Miomir Kecmanović (Netherlands) Botic van de Zandschulp
1 Feb	Great Ocean Road Open; Melbourne, Australia; ATP 250; Hard – $382,575 – 56S/24D; Singles – Doubles	(United Kingdom) Jamie Murray (Brazil) Bruno Soares; 6–3, 7–6^{(9–7)}	(Colombia) Juan Sebastián Cabal (Colombia) Robert Farah	(Brazil) Thiago Monteiro (Russia) Karen Khachanov	(Australia) Jordan Thompson (Poland) Hubert Hurkacz (Serbia) Miomir Kecmanović (Netherlands) Botic van de Zandschulp
1 Feb	Murray River Open; Melbourne, Australia; ATP 250; Hard – $382,575 – 56S/24D; Singles – Doubles	(United Kingdom) Dan Evans; 6–2, 6–3	(Canada) Félix Auger-Aliassime	(France) Jérémy Chardy (France) Corentin Moutet	(Switzerland) Stan Wawrinka (Croatia) Borna Ćorić (Czech Republic) Jiří Veselý (Bulgaria) Grigor Dimitrov
1 Feb	Murray River Open; Melbourne, Australia; ATP 250; Hard – $382,575 – 56S/24D; Singles – Doubles	(Croatia) Nikola Mektić (Croatia) Mate Pavić; 7–6^{(7–2)}, 6–3	(France) Jérémy Chardy (France) Fabrice Martin	(France) Jérémy Chardy (France) Corentin Moutet	(Switzerland) Stan Wawrinka (Croatia) Borna Ćorić (Czech Republic) Jiří Veselý (Bulgaria) Grigor Dimitrov
8 Feb; 15 Feb	Australian Open (Note: Qualifying matches were held at Khalifa International Tennis and Squash Complex in Doha, Qatar from 10–13 January due to Australia's quarantine restrictions.); Melbourne, Australia; Grand Slam; Hard – A$32,790,000; 128S/128Q/64D/32X; Singles – Doubles – Mixed	(Serbia) Novak Djokovic; 7–5, 6–2, 6–2	(Russia) Daniil Medvedev	(Russia) Aslan Karatsev (Greece) Stefanos Tsitsipas	(Germany) Alexander Zverev (Bulgaria) Grigor Dimitrov (Russia) Andrey Rublev (Spain) Rafael Nadal
8 Feb; 15 Feb	Australian Open; Melbourne, Australia; Grand Slam; Hard – A$32,790,000; 128S/128Q/64D/32X; Singles – Doubles – Mixed	(Croatia) Ivan Dodig (Slovakia) Filip Polášek; 6–3, 6–4	(United States) Rajeev Ram (United Kingdom) Joe Salisbury	(Russia) Aslan Karatsev (Greece) Stefanos Tsitsipas	(Germany) Alexander Zverev (Bulgaria) Grigor Dimitrov (Russia) Andrey Rublev (Spain) Rafael Nadal
8 Feb; 15 Feb	Australian Open; Melbourne, Australia; Grand Slam; Hard – A$32,790,000; 128S/128Q/64D/32X; Singles – Doubles – Mixed	(Czech Republic) Barbora Krejčíková (United States) Rajeev Ram; 6–1, 6–4	(Australia) Samantha Stosur (Australia) Matthew Ebden	(Russia) Aslan Karatsev (Greece) Stefanos Tsitsipas	(Germany) Alexander Zverev (Bulgaria) Grigor Dimitrov (Russia) Andrey Rublev (Spain) Rafael Nadal
22 Feb	Open Sud de France; Montpellier, France; ATP 250; Hard (i) – €323,970 – 28S/16Q/16D; Singles – Doubles	(Belgium) David Goffin; 5–7, 6–4, 6–2	(Spain) Roberto Bautista Agut	(Germany) Peter Gojowczyk (Belarus) Egor Gerasimov	(France) Ugo Humbert (Austria) Dennis Novak (Spain) Alejandro Davidovich; Fokina (Italy) Lorenzo Sonego
22 Feb	Open Sud de France; Montpellier, France; ATP 250; Hard (i) – €323,970 – 28S/16Q/16D; Singles – Doubles	(Finland) Henri Kontinen (France) Édouard Roger-Vasselin; 6–2, 7–5	(Israel) Jonathan Erlich (Belarus) Andrei Vasilevski	(Germany) Peter Gojowczyk (Belarus) Egor Gerasimov	(France) Ugo Humbert (Austria) Dennis Novak (Spain) Alejandro Davidovich; Fokina (Italy) Lorenzo Sonego
22 Feb	Córdoba Open; Córdoba, Argentina; ATP 250; Clay (red) – $393,935 – 28S/32Q/16D; Singles – Doubles	(Argentina) Juan Manuel Cerúndolo; 6–0, 2–6, 6–2	(Spain) Albert Ramos Viñolas	(Argentina) Facundo Bagnis (Argentina) Federico Coria	(Argentina) Diego Schwartzman (Slovakia) Jozef Kovalík (Brazil) Thiago Monteiro (France) Benoît Paire
22 Feb	Córdoba Open; Córdoba, Argentina; ATP 250; Clay (red) – $393,935 – 28S/32Q/16D; Singles – Doubles	(Brazil) Rafael Matos (Brazil) Felipe Meligeni Alves; 6–4, 6–1	(Monaco) Romain Arneodo (France) Benoît Paire	(Argentina) Facundo Bagnis (Argentina) Federico Coria	(Argentina) Diego Schwartzman (Slovakia) Jozef Kovalík (Brazil) Thiago Monteiro (France) Benoît Paire
22 Feb	Singapore Open; Singapore, Singapore; ATP 250; Hard (i) – $361,800 – 28S/16Q/16D; Singles – Doubles	(Australia) Alexei Popyrin; 4–6, 6–0, 6–2	(Kazakhstan) Alexander Bublik	(Moldova) Radu Albot (Croatia) Marin Čilić	(France) Adrian Mannarino (Japan) Yoshihito Nishioka (South Korea) Kwon Soon-woo (Australia) Matthew Ebden
22 Feb	Singapore Open; Singapore, Singapore; ATP 250; Hard (i) – $361,800 – 28S/16Q/16D; Singles – Doubles	(Belgium) Sander Gillé (Belgium) Joran Vliegen; 6–2, 6–3	(Australia) Matthew Ebden (Australia) John-Patrick Smith	(Moldova) Radu Albot (Croatia) Marin Čilić	(France) Adrian Mannarino (Japan) Yoshihito Nishioka (South Korea) Kwon Soon-woo (Australia) Matthew Ebden

=== March ===
Week	Tournament	Champions	Runners-up	Semifinalists	Quarterfinalists
1 Mar	Rotterdam Open; Rotterdam, Netherlands; ATP 500; Hard (i) – €1,117,900 – 32S/16Q/16D; Singles – Doubles	(Russia) Andrey Rublev; 7–6^{(7–4)}, 6–4	(Hungary) Márton Fucsovics	(Croatia) Borna Ćorić (Greece) Stefanos Tsitsipas	(Japan) Kei Nishikori (United States) Tommy Paul (France) Jérémy Chardy (Russia) Karen Khachanov
1 Mar	Rotterdam Open; Rotterdam, Netherlands; ATP 500; Hard (i) – €1,117,900 – 32S/16Q/16D; Singles – Doubles	(Croatia) Nikola Mektić (Croatia) Mate Pavić; 7–6^{(9–7)}, 6–2	(Germany) Kevin Krawietz (Romania) Horia Tecău	(Croatia) Borna Ćorić (Greece) Stefanos Tsitsipas	(Japan) Kei Nishikori (United States) Tommy Paul (France) Jérémy Chardy (Russia) Karen Khachanov
1 Mar	Argentina Open; Buenos Aires, Argentina; ATP 250; Clay (red) – $411,940 – 28S/32Q/16D; Singles – Doubles	(Argentina) Diego Schwartzman; 6–1, 6–2	(Argentina) Francisco Cerúndolo	(Serbia) Miomir Kecmanović (Spain) Albert Ramos Viñolas	(Spain) Jaume Munar (Serbia) Laslo Đere (Spain) Pablo Andújar (India) Sumit Nagal
1 Mar	Argentina Open; Buenos Aires, Argentina; ATP 250; Clay (red) – $411,940 – 28S/32Q/16D; Singles – Doubles	(Bosnia and Herzegovina) Tomislav Brkić (Serbia) Nikola Ćaćić; 6–3, 7–5	(Uruguay) Ariel Behar (Ecuador) Gonzalo Escobar	(Serbia) Miomir Kecmanović (Spain) Albert Ramos Viñolas	(Spain) Jaume Munar (Serbia) Laslo Đere (Spain) Pablo Andújar (India) Sumit Nagal
8 Mar	Qatar Open; Doha, Qatar; ATP 250; Hard – $890,920 – 28S/16Q/16D; Singles – Doubles	(Georgia (country)) Nikoloz Basilashvili; 7–6^{(7–5)}, 6–2	(Spain) Roberto Bautista Agut	(Russia) Andrey Rublev (United States) Taylor Fritz	(Austria) Dominic Thiem (Hungary) Márton Fucsovics (Canada) Denis Shapovalov (Switzerland) Roger Federer
8 Mar	Qatar Open; Doha, Qatar; ATP 250; Hard – $890,920 – 28S/16Q/16D; Singles – Doubles	(Russia) Aslan Karatsev (Russia) Andrey Rublev; 7–5, 6–4	(New Zealand) Marcus Daniell (Austria) Philipp Oswald	(Russia) Andrey Rublev (United States) Taylor Fritz	(Austria) Dominic Thiem (Hungary) Márton Fucsovics (Canada) Denis Shapovalov (Switzerland) Roger Federer
8 Mar	Open 13; Marseille, France; ATP 250; Hard (i) – €409,765 – 28S/16Q/16D; Singles – Doubles	(Russia) Daniil Medvedev; 6–4, 6–7^{(4–7)}, 6–4	(France) Pierre-Hugues Herbert	(Australia) Matthew Ebden (France) Ugo Humbert	(Italy) Jannik Sinner (Russia) Karen Khachanov (France) Arthur Rinderknech (Greece) Stefanos Tsitsipas
8 Mar	Open 13; Marseille, France; ATP 250; Hard (i) – €409,765 – 28S/16Q/16D; Singles – Doubles	(United Kingdom) Lloyd Glasspool (Finland) Harri Heliövaara; 7–5, 7–6^{(7–4)}	(Netherlands) Sander Arends (Netherlands) David Pel	(Australia) Matthew Ebden (France) Ugo Humbert	(Italy) Jannik Sinner (Russia) Karen Khachanov (France) Arthur Rinderknech (Greece) Stefanos Tsitsipas
8 Mar	Chile Open; Santiago, Chile; ATP 250; Clay (red) – $393,935 – 28S/32Q/16D; Singles – Doubles	(Chile) Cristian Garín; 6–4, 6–7^{(3–7)}, 7–5	(Argentina) Facundo Bagnis	(Colombia) Daniel Elahi Galán (Argentina) Federico Delbonis	(Peru) Juan Pablo Varillas (Spain) Roberto Carballés Baena (Serbia) Laslo Đere (Denmark) Holger Rune
8 Mar	Chile Open; Santiago, Chile; ATP 250; Clay (red) – $393,935 – 28S/32Q/16D; Singles – Doubles	(Italy) Simone Bolelli (Argentina) Máximo González; 7–6^{(7–4)}, 6–4	(Argentina) Federico Delbonis (Spain) Jaume Munar	(Colombia) Daniel Elahi Galán (Argentina) Federico Delbonis	(Peru) Juan Pablo Varillas (Spain) Roberto Carballés Baena (Serbia) Laslo Đere (Denmark) Holger Rune
15 Mar	Dubai Tennis Championships; Dubai, United Arab Emirates; ATP 500; Hard – $2,048,855 – 48S/24Q/16D; Singles – Doubles	(Russia) Aslan Karatsev; 6–3, 6–2	(South Africa) Lloyd Harris	(Canada) Denis Shapovalov (Russia) Andrey Rublev	(Japan) Kei Nishikori (France) Jérémy Chardy (Italy) Jannik Sinner (Hungary) Márton Fucsovics
15 Mar	Dubai Tennis Championships; Dubai, United Arab Emirates; ATP 500; Hard – $2,048,855 – 48S/24Q/16D; Singles – Doubles	(Colombia) Juan Sebastián Cabal (Colombia) Robert Farah; 7–6^{(7–0)}, 7–6^{(7–4)}	(Croatia) Nikola Mektić (Croatia) Mate Pavić	(Canada) Denis Shapovalov (Russia) Andrey Rublev	(Japan) Kei Nishikori (France) Jérémy Chardy (Italy) Jannik Sinner (Hungary) Márton Fucsovics
15 Mar	Mexican Open; Acapulco, Mexico; ATP 500; Hard – $1,204,960 – 32S/32Q/16D; Singles – Doubles	(Germany) Alexander Zverev; 6–4, 7–6^{(7–3)}	(Greece) Stefanos Tsitsipas	(Italy) Lorenzo Musetti (Germany) Dominik Koepfer	(Canada) Félix Auger-Aliassime (Bulgaria) Grigor Dimitrov (United Kingdom) Cameron Norrie (Norway) Casper Ruud
15 Mar	Mexican Open; Acapulco, Mexico; ATP 500; Hard – $1,204,960 – 32S/32Q/16D; Singles – Doubles	(United Kingdom) Ken Skupski (United Kingdom) Neal Skupski; 7–6^{(7–3)}, 6–4	(Spain) Marcel Granollers (Argentina) Horacio Zeballos	(Italy) Lorenzo Musetti (Germany) Dominik Koepfer	(Canada) Félix Auger-Aliassime (Bulgaria) Grigor Dimitrov (United Kingdom) Cameron Norrie (Norway) Casper Ruud
22 Mar; 29 Mar	Miami Open; Miami Gardens, United States; ATP Masters 1000; Hard – $3,343,785 – 96S/48Q/32D; Singles – Doubles	(Poland) Hubert Hurkacz; 7–6^{(7–4)}, 6–4	(Italy) Jannik Sinner	(Spain) Roberto Bautista Agut (Russia) Andrey Rublev	(Russia) Daniil Medvedev (Kazakhstan) Alexander Bublik (United States) Sebastian Korda (Greece) Stefanos Tsitsipas
22 Mar; 29 Mar	Miami Open; Miami Gardens, United States; ATP Masters 1000; Hard – $3,343,785 – 96S/48Q/32D; Singles – Doubles	(Croatia) Nikola Mektić (Croatia) Mate Pavić; 6–4, 6–4	(United Kingdom) Dan Evans (United Kingdom) Neal Skupski	(Spain) Roberto Bautista Agut (Russia) Andrey Rublev	(Russia) Daniil Medvedev (Kazakhstan) Alexander Bublik (United States) Sebastian Korda (Greece) Stefanos Tsitsipas

=== April ===
Week	Tournament	Champions	Runners-up	Semifinalists	Quarterfinalists
5 Apr	Andalucía Open; Marbella, Spain; ATP 250; Clay (red) – €408,800 – 28S/16Q/16D; Singles – Doubles	(Spain) Pablo Carreño Busta; 6–1, 2–6, 6–4	(Spain) Jaume Munar	(Spain) Albert Ramos Viñolas (Spain) Carlos Alcaraz	(South Korea) Kwon Soon-woo (Slovakia) Norbert Gombos (Norway) Casper Ruud (Belarus) Ilya Ivashka
5 Apr	Andalucía Open; Marbella, Spain; ATP 250; Clay (red) – €408,800 – 28S/16Q/16D; Singles – Doubles	(Uruguay) Ariel Behar (Ecuador) Gonzalo Escobar; 6–2, 6–4	(Bosnia and Herzegovina) Tomislav Brkić (Serbia) Nikola Ćaćić	(Spain) Albert Ramos Viñolas (Spain) Carlos Alcaraz	(South Korea) Kwon Soon-woo (Slovakia) Norbert Gombos (Norway) Casper Ruud (Belarus) Ilya Ivashka
5 Apr	Sardegna Open; Cagliari, Italy; ATP 250; Clay (red) – €408,800 – 28S/16Q/16D; Singles – Doubles	(Italy) Lorenzo Sonego; 2–6, 7–6^{(7–5)}, 6–4	(Serbia) Laslo Đere	(Georgia (country)) Nikoloz Basilashvili (United States) Taylor Fritz	(Italy) Lorenzo Musetti (Germany) Jan-Lennard Struff (Germany) Yannick Hanfmann (Slovenia) Aljaž Bedene
5 Apr	Sardegna Open; Cagliari, Italy; ATP 250; Clay (red) – €408,800 – 28S/16Q/16D; Singles – Doubles	(Italy) Lorenzo Sonego (Italy) Andrea Vavassori; 6–3, 6–4	(Italy) Simone Bolelli (Argentina) Andrés Molteni	(Georgia (country)) Nikoloz Basilashvili (United States) Taylor Fritz	(Italy) Lorenzo Musetti (Germany) Jan-Lennard Struff (Germany) Yannick Hanfmann (Slovenia) Aljaž Bedene
12 Apr	Monte-Carlo Masters; Roquebrune-Cap-Martin, France; ATP Masters 1000; Clay (red) – €2,082,960 – 56S/28Q/28D; Singles – Doubles	(Greece) Stefanos Tsitsipas; 6–3, 6–3	(Russia) Andrey Rublev	(United Kingdom) Dan Evans (Norway) Casper Ruud	(Belgium) David Goffin (Spain) Alejandro Davidovich; Fokina (Spain) Rafael Nadal (Italy) Fabio Fognini
12 Apr	Monte-Carlo Masters; Roquebrune-Cap-Martin, France; ATP Masters 1000; Clay (red) – €2,082,960 – 56S/28Q/28D; Singles – Doubles	(Croatia) Nikola Mektić (Croatia) Mate Pavić; 6–3, 4–6, [10–7]	(United Kingdom) Dan Evans (United Kingdom) Neal Skupski	(United Kingdom) Dan Evans (Norway) Casper Ruud	(Belgium) David Goffin (Spain) Alejandro Davidovich; Fokina (Spain) Rafael Nadal (Italy) Fabio Fognini
19 Apr	Barcelona Open; Barcelona, Spain; ATP 500; Clay (red) – €1,702,800 – 48S/24Q/16D; Singles – Doubles	(Spain) Rafael Nadal; 6–4, 6–7^{(6–8)}, 7–5	(Greece) Stefanos Tsitsipas	(Spain) Pablo Carreño Busta (Italy) Jannik Sinner	(United Kingdom) Cameron Norrie (Argentina) Diego Schwartzman (Russia) Andrey Rublev (Canada) Félix Auger-Aliassime
19 Apr	Barcelona Open; Barcelona, Spain; ATP 500; Clay (red) – €1,702,800 – 48S/24Q/16D; Singles – Doubles	(Colombia) Juan Sebastián Cabal (Colombia) Robert Farah; 6–4, 6–2	(Germany) Kevin Krawietz (Romania) Horia Tecău	(Spain) Pablo Carreño Busta (Italy) Jannik Sinner	(United Kingdom) Cameron Norrie (Argentina) Diego Schwartzman (Russia) Andrey Rublev (Canada) Félix Auger-Aliassime
19 Apr	Serbia Open; Belgrade, Serbia; ATP 250; Clay (red) – €711,800 – 28S/16Q/16D; Singles – Doubles	(Italy) Matteo Berrettini; 6–1, 3–6, 7–6^{(7–0)}	(Russia) Aslan Karatsev	(Serbia) Novak Djokovic (Japan) Taro Daniel	(Serbia) Miomir Kecmanović (Italy) Gianluca Mager (Argentina) Federico Delbonis (Serbia) Filip Krajinović
19 Apr	Serbia Open; Belgrade, Serbia; ATP 250; Clay (red) – €711,800 – 28S/16Q/16D; Singles – Doubles	(Croatia) Ivan Sabanov (Croatia) Matej Sabanov; 6–3, 7–6^{(7–5)}	(Uruguay) Ariel Behar (Ecuador) Gonzalo Escobar	(Serbia) Novak Djokovic (Japan) Taro Daniel	(Serbia) Miomir Kecmanović (Italy) Gianluca Mager (Argentina) Federico Delbonis (Serbia) Filip Krajinović
26 Apr	Estoril Open; Cascais, Portugal; ATP 250; Clay (red) – €481,270 – 28S/16Q/16D; Singles – Doubles	(Spain) Albert Ramos Viñolas; 4–6, 6–3, 7–6^{(7–3)}	(United Kingdom) Cameron Norrie	(Spain) Alejandro Davidovich; Fokina (Croatia) Marin Čilić	(France) Corentin Moutet (France) Ugo Humbert (South Africa) Kevin Anderson (Chile) Cristian Garín
26 Apr	Estoril Open; Cascais, Portugal; ATP 250; Clay (red) – €481,270 – 28S/16Q/16D; Singles – Doubles	(Monaco) Hugo Nys (Germany) Tim Pütz; 7–5, 3–6, [10–3]	(United Kingdom) Luke Bambridge (United Kingdom) Dominic Inglot	(Spain) Alejandro Davidovich; Fokina (Croatia) Marin Čilić	(France) Corentin Moutet (France) Ugo Humbert (South Africa) Kevin Anderson (Chile) Cristian Garín
26 Apr	Bavarian International Tennis; Championships; Munich, Germany; ATP 250; Clay (red) – €481,270 – 28S/16Q/16D; Singles – Doubles	(Georgia (country)) Nikoloz Basilashvili; 6–4, 7–6^{(7–5)}	(Germany) Jan-Lennard Struff	(Belarus) Ilya Ivashka (Norway) Casper Ruud	(Germany) Alexander Zverev (Serbia) Filip Krajinović (Slovakia) Norbert Gombos (Australia) John Millman
26 Apr	Bavarian International Tennis; Championships; Munich, Germany; ATP 250; Clay (red) – €481,270 – 28S/16Q/16D; Singles – Doubles	(Netherlands) Wesley Koolhof (Germany) Kevin Krawietz; 4–6, 6–4, [10–5]	(Belgium) Sander Gillé (Belgium) Joran Vliegen	(Belarus) Ilya Ivashka (Norway) Casper Ruud	(Germany) Alexander Zverev (Serbia) Filip Krajinović (Slovakia) Norbert Gombos (Australia) John Millman

=== May ===
Week	Tournament	Champions	Runners-up	Semifinalists	Quarterfinalists
3 May	Madrid Open; Madrid, Spain; ATP Masters 1000; Clay (red) – €2,614,465 – 56S/28Q/28D; Singles – Doubles	(Germany) Alexander Zverev; 6–7^{(8–10)}, 6–4, 6–3	(Italy) Matteo Berrettini	(Austria) Dominic Thiem (Norway) Casper Ruud	(Spain) Rafael Nadal (United States) John Isner (Kazakhstan) Alexander Bublik (Chile) Cristian Garín
3 May	Madrid Open; Madrid, Spain; ATP Masters 1000; Clay (red) – €2,614,465 – 56S/28Q/28D; Singles – Doubles	(Spain) Marcel Granollers (Argentina) Horacio Zeballos; 1–6, 6–3, [10–8]	(Croatia) Nikola Mektić (Croatia) Mate Pavić	(Austria) Dominic Thiem (Norway) Casper Ruud	(Spain) Rafael Nadal (United States) John Isner (Kazakhstan) Alexander Bublik (Chile) Cristian Garín
10 May	Italian Open; Rome, Italy; ATP Masters 1000; Clay (red) – €2,082,960 – 56S/28Q/32D; Singles – Doubles	(Spain) Rafael Nadal; 7–5, 1–6, 6–3	(Serbia) Novak Djokovic	(Italy) Lorenzo Sonego (United States) Reilly Opelka	(Greece) Stefanos Tsitsipas (Russia) Andrey Rublev (Argentina) Federico Delbonis (Germany) Alexander Zverev
10 May	Italian Open; Rome, Italy; ATP Masters 1000; Clay (red) – €2,082,960 – 56S/28Q/32D; Singles – Doubles	(Croatia) Nikola Mektić (Croatia) Mate Pavić; 6–4, 7–6^{(7–4)}	(United States) Rajeev Ram (United Kingdom) Joe Salisbury	(Italy) Lorenzo Sonego (United States) Reilly Opelka	(Greece) Stefanos Tsitsipas (Russia) Andrey Rublev (Argentina) Federico Delbonis (Germany) Alexander Zverev
17 May	Geneva Open; Geneva, Switzerland; ATP 250; Clay (red) – €481,270 – 28S/16Q/16D; Singles – Doubles	(Norway) Casper Ruud; 7–6^{(8–6)}, 6–4	(Canada) Denis Shapovalov	(Spain) Pablo Andújar (Uruguay) Pablo Cuevas	(Switzerland) Dominic Stricker (Germany) Dominik Koepfer (Bulgaria) Grigor Dimitrov (Serbia) Laslo Đere
17 May	Geneva Open; Geneva, Switzerland; ATP 250; Clay (red) – €481,270 – 28S/16Q/16D; Singles – Doubles	(Australia) John Peers (New Zealand) Michael Venus; 6–2, 7–5	(Italy) Simone Bolelli (Argentina) Máximo González	(Spain) Pablo Andújar (Uruguay) Pablo Cuevas	(Switzerland) Dominic Stricker (Germany) Dominik Koepfer (Bulgaria) Grigor Dimitrov (Serbia) Laslo Đere
17 May	Lyon Open; Lyon, France; ATP 250; Clay (red) – €481,270 – 28S/16Q/16D; Singles – Doubles	(Greece) Stefanos Tsitsipas; 6–3, 6–3	(United Kingdom) Cameron Norrie	(Russia) Karen Khachanov (Italy) Lorenzo Musetti	(France) Arthur Rinderknech (France) Richard Gasquet (Slovenia) Aljaž Bedene (Japan) Yoshihito Nishioka
17 May	Lyon Open; Lyon, France; ATP 250; Clay (red) – €481,270 – 28S/16Q/16D; Singles – Doubles	(Monaco) Hugo Nys (Germany) Tim Pütz; 6–4, 5–7, [10–8]	(France) Pierre-Hugues Herbert (France) Nicolas Mahut	(Russia) Karen Khachanov (Italy) Lorenzo Musetti	(France) Arthur Rinderknech (France) Richard Gasquet (Slovenia) Aljaž Bedene (Japan) Yoshihito Nishioka
24 May	Emilia-Romagna Open; Parma, Italy; ATP 250; Clay (red) – €480,000 – 28S/16Q/16D; Singles – Doubles	(United States) Sebastian Korda; 6–2, 6–4	(Italy) Marco Cecchinato	(United States) Tommy Paul (Spain) Jaume Munar	(Japan) Yoshihito Nishioka (Germany) Jan-Lennard Struff (Slovakia) Norbert Gombos (France) Richard Gasquet
24 May	Emilia-Romagna Open; Parma, Italy; ATP 250; Clay (red) – €480,000 – 28S/16Q/16D; Singles – Doubles	(Italy) Simone Bolelli (Argentina) Máximo González; 6–3, 6–3	(Austria) Oliver Marach (Pakistan) Aisam-ul-Haq Qureshi	(United States) Tommy Paul (Spain) Jaume Munar	(Japan) Yoshihito Nishioka (Germany) Jan-Lennard Struff (Slovakia) Norbert Gombos (France) Richard Gasquet
24 May	Belgrade Open; Belgrade, Serbia; ATP 250; Clay (red) – €511,000 – 28S/16Q/16D; Singles – Doubles	(Serbia) Novak Djokovic; 6–4, 6–3	(Slovakia) Alex Molčan	(Slovakia) Andrej Martin (Argentina) Federico Delbonis	(Argentina) Federico Coria (Serbia) Dušan Lajović (Spain) Fernando Verdasco (Spain) Roberto Carballés Baena
24 May	Belgrade Open; Belgrade, Serbia; ATP 250; Clay (red) – €511,000 – 28S/16Q/16D; Singles – Doubles	(Israel) Jonathan Erlich (Belarus) Andrei Vasilevski; 6–4, 6–1	(Sweden) André Göransson (Brazil) Rafael Matos	(Slovakia) Andrej Martin (Argentina) Federico Delbonis	(Argentina) Federico Coria (Serbia) Dušan Lajović (Spain) Fernando Verdasco (Spain) Roberto Carballés Baena
31 May; 7 Jun	French Open; Paris, France; Grand Slam; Clay (red) – €16,813,510; 128S/128Q/64D/16X; Singles – Doubles – Mixed	(Serbia) Novak Djokovic; 6–7^{(6–8)}, 2–6, 6–3, 6–2, 6–4	(Greece) Stefanos Tsitsipas	(Spain) Rafael Nadal (Germany) Alexander Zverev	(Italy) Matteo Berrettini (Argentina) Diego Schwartzman (Spain) Alejandro Davidovich; Fokina (Russia) Daniil Medvedev
31 May; 7 Jun	French Open; Paris, France; Grand Slam; Clay (red) – €16,813,510; 128S/128Q/64D/16X; Singles – Doubles – Mixed	(France) Pierre-Hugues Herbert (France) Nicolas Mahut; 4–6, 7–6^{(7–1)}, 6–4	(Kazakhstan) Alexander Bublik (Kazakhstan) Andrey Golubev	(Spain) Rafael Nadal (Germany) Alexander Zverev	(Italy) Matteo Berrettini (Argentina) Diego Schwartzman (Spain) Alejandro Davidovich; Fokina (Russia) Daniil Medvedev
31 May; 7 Jun	French Open; Paris, France; Grand Slam; Clay (red) – €16,813,510; 128S/128Q/64D/16X; Singles – Doubles – Mixed	(United States) Desirae Krawczyk (United Kingdom) Joe Salisbury; 2–6, 6–4, [10–5]	(Russia) Elena Vesnina (Russia) Aslan Karatsev	(Spain) Rafael Nadal (Germany) Alexander Zverev	(Italy) Matteo Berrettini (Argentina) Diego Schwartzman (Spain) Alejandro Davidovich; Fokina (Russia) Daniil Medvedev

=== June ===
Week	Tournament	Champions	Runners-up	Semifinalists	Quarterfinalists
7 Jun	Stuttgart Open; Stuttgart, Germany; ATP 250; Grass – €618,735 – 28S/16Q/16D; Singles – Doubles	(Croatia) Marin Čilić; 7–6^{(7–2)}, 6–3	(Canada) Félix Auger-Aliassime	(Austria) Jurij Rodionov (United States) Sam Querrey	(Canada) Denis Shapovalov (Australia) Alex de Minaur (France) Ugo Humbert (Switzerland) Dominic Stricker
7 Jun	Stuttgart Open; Stuttgart, Germany; ATP 250; Grass – €618,735 – 28S/16Q/16D; Singles – Doubles	(Brazil) Marcelo Demoliner (Mexico) Santiago González; 4–6, 6–3, [10–8]	(Uruguay) Ariel Behar (Ecuador) Gonzalo Escobar	(Austria) Jurij Rodionov (United States) Sam Querrey	(Canada) Denis Shapovalov (Australia) Alex de Minaur (France) Ugo Humbert (Switzerland) Dominic Stricker
14 Jun	Halle Open; Halle, Germany; ATP 500; Grass – €1,455,925 – 32S/24Q/24D; Singles – Doubles	(France) Ugo Humbert; 6–3, 7–6^{(7–4)}	(Russia) Andrey Rublev	(Canada) Félix Auger-Aliassime (Georgia (country)) Nikoloz Basilashvili	(United States) Marcos Giron (United States) Sebastian Korda (Germany) Philipp Kohlschreiber (South Africa) Lloyd Harris
14 Jun	Halle Open; Halle, Germany; ATP 500; Grass – €1,455,925 – 32S/24Q/24D; Singles – Doubles	(Germany) Kevin Krawietz (Romania) Horia Tecău; 7–6^{(7–4)}, 6–4	(Canada) Félix Auger-Aliassime (Poland) Hubert Hurkacz	(Canada) Félix Auger-Aliassime (Georgia (country)) Nikoloz Basilashvili	(United States) Marcos Giron (United States) Sebastian Korda (Germany) Philipp Kohlschreiber (South Africa) Lloyd Harris
14 Jun	Queen's Club Championships; London, United Kingdom; ATP 500; Grass – €1,427,455 – 32S/16Q/24D; Singles – Doubles	(Italy) Matteo Berrettini; 6–4, 6–7^{(5–7)}, 6–3	(United Kingdom) Cameron Norrie	(Australia) Alex de Minaur (Canada) Denis Shapovalov	(United Kingdom) Dan Evans (Croatia) Marin Čilić (United Kingdom) Jack Draper (United States) Frances Tiafoe
14 Jun	Queen's Club Championships; London, United Kingdom; ATP 500; Grass – €1,427,455 – 32S/16Q/24D; Singles – Doubles	(France) Pierre-Hugues Herbert (France) Nicolas Mahut; 6–4, 7–5	(United States) Reilly Opelka (Australia) John Peers	(Australia) Alex de Minaur (Canada) Denis Shapovalov	(United Kingdom) Dan Evans (Croatia) Marin Čilić (United Kingdom) Jack Draper (United States) Frances Tiafoe
21 Jun	Eastbourne International; Eastbourne, United Kingdom; ATP 250; Grass – €609,065 – 28S/16Q/16D; Singles – Doubles	(Australia) Alex de Minaur; 4–6, 6–4, 7–6^{(7–5)}	(Italy) Lorenzo Sonego	(Australia) Max Purcell (South Korea) Kwon Soon-woo	(Italy) Andreas Seppi (Kazakhstan) Alexander Bublik (Belarus) Ilya Ivashka (Canada) Vasek Pospisil
21 Jun	Eastbourne International; Eastbourne, United Kingdom; ATP 250; Grass – €609,065 – 28S/16Q/16D; Singles – Doubles	(Croatia) Nikola Mektić (Croatia) Mate Pavić; 6–4, 6–3	(United States) Rajeev Ram (United Kingdom) Joe Salisbury	(Australia) Max Purcell (South Korea) Kwon Soon-woo	(Italy) Andreas Seppi (Kazakhstan) Alexander Bublik (Belarus) Ilya Ivashka (Canada) Vasek Pospisil
21 Jun	Mallorca Championships; Santa Ponsa, Spain; ATP 250; Grass – €783,655 – 28S/16Q/16D; Singles – Doubles	(Russia) Daniil Medvedev; 6–4, 6–2	(United States) Sam Querrey	(Spain) Pablo Carreño Busta (France) Adrian Mannarino	(Norway) Casper Ruud (Australia) Jordan Thompson (Spain) Roberto Bautista Agut (Spain) Feliciano López
21 Jun	Mallorca Championships; Santa Ponsa, Spain; ATP 250; Grass – €783,655 – 28S/16Q/16D; Singles – Doubles	(Italy) Simone Bolelli (Argentina) Máximo González; Walkover	(Serbia) Novak Djokovic (Spain) Carlos Gómez-Herrera	(Spain) Pablo Carreño Busta (France) Adrian Mannarino	(Norway) Casper Ruud (Australia) Jordan Thompson (Spain) Roberto Bautista Agut (Spain) Feliciano López
28 Jun; 5 Jul	Wimbledon; London, United Kingdom; Grand Slam; Grass – £17,066,000; 128S/128Q/64D/48X; Singles – Doubles – Mixed	(Serbia) Novak Djokovic; 6–7^{(4–7)}, 6–4, 6–4, 6–3	(Italy) Matteo Berrettini	(Canada) Denis Shapovalov (Poland) Hubert Hurkacz	(Hungary) Márton Fucsovics (Russia) Karen Khachanov (Canada) Félix Auger-Aliassime (Switzerland) Roger Federer
28 Jun; 5 Jul	Wimbledon; London, United Kingdom; Grand Slam; Grass – £17,066,000; 128S/128Q/64D/48X; Singles – Doubles – Mixed	(Croatia) Nikola Mektić (Croatia) Mate Pavić; 6–4, 7–6^{(7–5)}, 2–6, 7–5	(Spain) Marcel Granollers (Argentina) Horacio Zeballos	(Canada) Denis Shapovalov (Poland) Hubert Hurkacz	(Hungary) Márton Fucsovics (Russia) Karen Khachanov (Canada) Félix Auger-Aliassime (Switzerland) Roger Federer
28 Jun; 5 Jul	Wimbledon; London, United Kingdom; Grand Slam; Grass – £17,066,000; 128S/128Q/64D/48X; Singles – Doubles – Mixed	(United Kingdom) Neal Skupski (United States) Desirae Krawczyk; 6–2, 7–6^{(7–1)}	(United Kingdom) Joe Salisbury (United Kingdom) Harriet Dart	(Canada) Denis Shapovalov (Poland) Hubert Hurkacz	(Hungary) Márton Fucsovics (Russia) Karen Khachanov (Canada) Félix Auger-Aliassime (Switzerland) Roger Federer

=== July ===
Week	Tournament	Champions	Runners-up	Semifinalists	Quarterfinalists
12 Jul	Hamburg Open; Hamburg, Germany; ATP 500; Clay (red) – €1,168,220 – 28S/24Q/16D; Singles – Doubles	(Spain) Pablo Carreño Busta; 6–2, 6–4	(Serbia) Filip Krajinović	(Serbia) Laslo Đere (Argentina) Federico Delbonis	(Greece) Stefanos Tsitsipas (Georgia (country)) Nikoloz Basilashvili (France) Benoît Paire (Serbia) Dušan Lajović
12 Jul	Hamburg Open; Hamburg, Germany; ATP 500; Clay (red) – €1,168,220 – 28S/24Q/16D; Singles – Doubles	(Germany) Tim Pütz (New Zealand) Michael Venus; 6–3, 6–7^{(7–3)}, [10–8]	(Germany) Kevin Krawietz (Romania) Horia Tecău	(Serbia) Laslo Đere (Argentina) Federico Delbonis	(Greece) Stefanos Tsitsipas (Georgia (country)) Nikoloz Basilashvili (France) Benoît Paire (Serbia) Dušan Lajović
12 Jul	Hall of Fame Open; Newport, United States; ATP 250; Grass – $535,535 – 28S/16Q/16D; Singles – Doubles	(South Africa) Kevin Anderson; 7–6^{(10–8)}, 6–4	(United States) Jenson Brooksby	(Kazakhstan) Alexander Bublik (Australia) Jordan Thompson	(Chinese Taipei) Jason Jung (United States) Jack Sock (Germany) Peter Gojowczyk (United States) Maxime Cressy
12 Jul	Hall of Fame Open; Newport, United States; ATP 250; Grass – $535,535 – 28S/16Q/16D; Singles – Doubles	(United States) William Blumberg (United States) Jack Sock; 6–2, 7–6^{(7–3)}	(United States) Austin Krajicek (Canada) Vasek Pospisil	(Kazakhstan) Alexander Bublik (Australia) Jordan Thompson	(Chinese Taipei) Jason Jung (United States) Jack Sock (Germany) Peter Gojowczyk (United States) Maxime Cressy
12 Jul	Swedish Open; Båstad, Sweden; ATP 250; Clay (red) – €481,270 – 28S/16Q/16D; Singles – Doubles	(Norway) Casper Ruud; 6–3, 6–3	(Argentina) Federico Coria	(Spain) Roberto Carballés Baena (Germany) Yannick Hanfmann	(Switzerland) Henri Laaksonen (Slovakia) Norbert Gombos (France) Arthur Rinderknech (Chile) Cristian Garín
12 Jul	Swedish Open; Båstad, Sweden; ATP 250; Clay (red) – €481,270 – 28S/16Q/16D; Singles – Doubles	(Netherlands) Sander Arends (Netherlands) David Pel; 6–4, 6–2	(Germany) Andre Begemann (France) Albano Olivetti	(Spain) Roberto Carballés Baena (Germany) Yannick Hanfmann	(Switzerland) Henri Laaksonen (Slovakia) Norbert Gombos (France) Arthur Rinderknech (Chile) Cristian Garín
19 Jul	Croatia Open; Umag, Croatia; ATP 250; Clay (red) – €481,270 – 28S/16Q/16D; Singles – Doubles	(Spain) Carlos Alcaraz; 6–2, 6–2	(France) Richard Gasquet	(Spain) Albert Ramos Viñolas (Germany) Daniel Altmaier	(Italy) Stefano Travaglia (Serbia) Filip Krajinović (Bosnia and Herzegovina) Damir Džumhur (Serbia) Dušan Lajović
19 Jul	Croatia Open; Umag, Croatia; ATP 250; Clay (red) – €481,270 – 28S/16Q/16D; Singles – Doubles	(Brazil) Fernando Romboli (Spain) David Vega Hernández; 6–3, 7–5	(Bosnia and Herzegovina) Tomislav Brkić (Serbia) Nikola Ćaćić	(Spain) Albert Ramos Viñolas (Germany) Daniel Altmaier	(Italy) Stefano Travaglia (Serbia) Filip Krajinović (Bosnia and Herzegovina) Damir Džumhur (Serbia) Dušan Lajović
19 Jul	Swiss Open; Gstaad, Switzerland; ATP 250; Clay (red) – €481,270 – 28S/16Q/16D; Singles – Doubles	(Norway) Casper Ruud; 6–3, 6–2	(France) Hugo Gaston	(Czech Republic) Vít Kopřiva (Serbia) Laslo Đere	(Sweden) Mikael Ymer (France) Benoît Paire (Chile) Cristian Garín (France) Arthur Rinderknech
19 Jul	Swiss Open; Gstaad, Switzerland; ATP 250; Clay (red) – €481,270 – 28S/16Q/16D; Singles – Doubles	(Switzerland) Marc-Andrea Hüsler (Switzerland) Dominic Stricker; 6–1, 7–6^{(9–7)}	(Poland) Szymon Walków (Poland) Jan Zieliński	(Czech Republic) Vít Kopřiva (Serbia) Laslo Đere	(Sweden) Mikael Ymer (France) Benoît Paire (Chile) Cristian Garín (France) Arthur Rinderknech
19 Jul	Los Cabos Open; Cabo San Lucas, Mexico; ATP 250; Hard – $694,655 – 28S/16Q/16D; Singles – Doubles	(United Kingdom) Cameron Norrie; 6–2, 6–2	(United States) Brandon Nakashima	(United States) Taylor Fritz (United States) John Isner	(United States) Ernesto Escobedo (United States) Steve Johnson (Australia) Jordan Thompson (Australia) Alex Bolt
19 Jul	Los Cabos Open; Cabo San Lucas, Mexico; ATP 250; Hard – $694,655 – 28S/16Q/16D; Singles – Doubles	(Mexico) Hans Hach Verdugo (United States) John Isner; 5–7, 6–2, [10–4]	(United States) Hunter Reese (Netherlands) Sem Verbeek	(United States) Taylor Fritz (United States) John Isner	(United States) Ernesto Escobedo (United States) Steve Johnson (Australia) Jordan Thompson (Australia) Alex Bolt
26 Jul	Summer Olympics; Tokyo, Japan; Olympic Games; Hard – 64S/32D/16X; Singles – Doubles – Mixed	Gold	Silver	Bronze	Fourth place
26 Jul	Summer Olympics; Tokyo, Japan; Olympic Games; Hard – 64S/32D/16X; Singles – Doubles – Mixed	(Germany) Alexander Zverev; 6–3, 6–1	(Russia) Karen Khachanov	(Spain) Pablo Carreño Busta; 6–4, 6–7^{(6–8)}, 6–3	(Serbia) Novak Djokovic
26 Jul	Summer Olympics; Tokyo, Japan; Olympic Games; Hard – 64S/32D/16X; Singles – Doubles – Mixed	(Croatia) Nikola Mektić (Croatia) Mate Pavić; 6–4, 3–6, [10–6]	(Croatia) Marin Čilić (Croatia) Ivan Dodig	(New Zealand) Marcus Daniell (New Zealand) Michael Venus; 7–6^{(7–3)}, 6–2	(United States) Austin Krajicek (United States) Tennys Sandgren
26 Jul	Summer Olympics; Tokyo, Japan; Olympic Games; Hard – 64S/32D/16X; Singles – Doubles – Mixed	(Russia) Anastasia Pavlyuchenkova (Russia) Andrey Rublev; 6–3, 6–7^{(5–7)}, [13–11]	(Russia) Elena Vesnina (Russia) Aslan Karatsev	(Australia) Ashleigh Barty (Australia) John Peers; Walkover	(Serbia) Nina Stojanović (Serbia) Novak Djokovic
26 Jul	Atlanta Open; Atlanta, United States; ATP 250; Hard – $638,385 – 28S/16Q/16D; Singles – Doubles	(United States) John Isner; 7–6 ^{(10–8)}, 7–5	(United States) Brandon Nakashima	(Finland) Emil Ruusuvuori (United States) Taylor Fritz	(Australia) Jordan Thompson (United Kingdom) Cameron Norrie (United States) Reilly Opelka (Australia) Christopher O'Connell
26 Jul	Atlanta Open; Atlanta, United States; ATP 250; Hard – $638,385 – 28S/16Q/16D; Singles – Doubles	(United States) Reilly Opelka (Italy) Jannik Sinner; 6–4, 6–7^{(6–8)}, [10–3]	(United States) Steve Johnson (Australia) Jordan Thompson	(Finland) Emil Ruusuvuori (United States) Taylor Fritz	(Australia) Jordan Thompson (United Kingdom) Cameron Norrie (United States) Reilly Opelka (Australia) Christopher O'Connell
26 Jul	Austrian Open; Kitzbühel, Austria; ATP 250; Clay (red) – €481,270 – 28S/16Q/16D; Singles – Doubles	(Norway) Casper Ruud; 6–1, 4–6, 6–3	(Spain) Pedro Martínez	(France) Arthur Rinderknech (Germany) Daniel Altmaier	(Sweden) Mikael Ymer (Serbia) Filip Krajinović (Italy) Gianluca Mager (Slovakia) Jozef Kovalík
26 Jul	Austrian Open; Kitzbühel, Austria; ATP 250; Clay (red) – €481,270 – 28S/16Q/16D; Singles – Doubles	(Austria) Alexander Erler (Austria) Lucas Miedler; 7–5, 7–6^{(7–5)}	(Czech Republic) Roman Jebavý (Netherlands) Matwé Middelkoop	(France) Arthur Rinderknech (Germany) Daniel Altmaier	(Sweden) Mikael Ymer (Serbia) Filip Krajinović (Italy) Gianluca Mager (Slovakia) Jozef Kovalík

=== August ===
Week	Tournament	Champions	Runners-up	Semifinalists	Quarterfinalists
2 Aug	Washington Open; Washington, D.C., United States; ATP 500; Hard – $2,046,340 – 48S/24Q/16D; Singles – Doubles	(Italy) Jannik Sinner; 7–5, 4–6, 7–5	(United States) Mackenzie McDonald	(Japan) Kei Nishikori (United States) Jenson Brooksby	(South Africa) Lloyd Harris (United States) Denis Kudla (United States) Steve Johnson (Australia) John Millman
2 Aug	Washington Open; Washington, D.C., United States; ATP 500; Hard – $2,046,340 – 48S/24Q/16D; Singles – Doubles	(South Africa) Raven Klaasen (Japan) Ben McLachlan; 7–6^{(7–4)}, 6–4	(United Kingdom) Neal Skupski (New Zealand) Michael Venus	(Japan) Kei Nishikori (United States) Jenson Brooksby	(South Africa) Lloyd Harris (United States) Denis Kudla (United States) Steve Johnson (Australia) John Millman
9 Aug	Canadian Open; Toronto, Canada; ATP Masters 1000; Hard – $2,850,970 – 48S/24Q/28D; Singles – Doubles	(Russia) Daniil Medvedev; 6–4, 6–3	(United States) Reilly Opelka	(United States) John Isner (Greece) Stefanos Tsitsipas	(Poland) Hubert Hurkacz (France) Gaël Monfils (Norway) Casper Ruud (Spain) Roberto Bautista Agut
9 Aug	Canadian Open; Toronto, Canada; ATP Masters 1000; Hard – $2,850,970 – 48S/24Q/28D; Singles – Doubles	(United States) Rajeev Ram (United Kingdom) Joe Salisbury; 6–3, 4–6, [10–3]	(Croatia) Nikola Mektić (Croatia) Mate Pavić	(United States) John Isner (Greece) Stefanos Tsitsipas	(Poland) Hubert Hurkacz (France) Gaël Monfils (Norway) Casper Ruud (Spain) Roberto Bautista Agut
16 Aug	Cincinnati Open; Mason, United States; ATP Masters 1000; Hard – $4,845,025 – 56S/28Q/28D; Singles – Doubles	(Germany) Alexander Zverev; 6–2, 6–3	(Russia) Andrey Rublev	(Russia) Daniil Medvedev (Greece) Stefanos Tsitsipas	(Spain) Pablo Carreño Busta (France) Benoît Paire (Norway) Casper Ruud (Canada) Félix Auger-Aliassime
16 Aug	Cincinnati Open; Mason, United States; ATP Masters 1000; Hard – $4,845,025 – 56S/28Q/28D; Singles – Doubles	(Spain) Marcel Granollers (Argentina) Horacio Zeballos; 7–6^{(7–5)}, 7–6^{(7–5)}	(United States) Steve Johnson (United States) Austin Krajicek	(Russia) Daniil Medvedev (Greece) Stefanos Tsitsipas	(Spain) Pablo Carreño Busta (France) Benoît Paire (Norway) Casper Ruud (Canada) Félix Auger-Aliassime
23 Aug	Winston-Salem Open; Winston-Salem, United States; ATP 250; Hard – $807,210 – 48S/16Q/16D; Singles – Doubles	(Belarus) Ilya Ivashka; 6–0, 6–2	(Sweden) Mikael Ymer	(Finland) Emil Ruusuvuori (Spain) Carlos Alcaraz	(Spain) Pablo Carreño Busta (France) Richard Gasquet (United States) Marcos Giron (United States) Frances Tiafoe
23 Aug	Winston-Salem Open; Winston-Salem, United States; ATP 250; Hard – $807,210 – 48S/16Q/16D; Singles – Doubles	(El Salvador) Marcelo Arévalo (Netherlands) Matwé Middelkoop; 6–7^{(5–7)}, 7–5, [10–6]	(Croatia) Ivan Dodig (United States) Austin Krajicek	(Finland) Emil Ruusuvuori (Spain) Carlos Alcaraz	(Spain) Pablo Carreño Busta (France) Richard Gasquet (United States) Marcos Giron (United States) Frances Tiafoe
30 Aug; 6 Sep	US Open; New York City, United States; Grand Slam; Hard – $26,562,000; 128S/128Q/64D/32X; Singles – Doubles – Mixed	(Russia) Daniil Medvedev; 6–4, 6–4, 6–4	(Serbia) Novak Djokovic	(Germany) Alexander Zverev (Canada) Félix Auger-Aliassime	(Italy) Matteo Berrettini (South Africa) Lloyd Harris (Spain) Carlos Alcaraz (Netherlands) Botic van de Zandschulp
30 Aug; 6 Sep	US Open; New York City, United States; Grand Slam; Hard – $26,562,000; 128S/128Q/64D/32X; Singles – Doubles – Mixed	(United States) Rajeev Ram (United Kingdom) Joe Salisbury; 3–6, 6–2, 6–2	(United Kingdom) Jamie Murray (Brazil) Bruno Soares	(Germany) Alexander Zverev (Canada) Félix Auger-Aliassime	(Italy) Matteo Berrettini (South Africa) Lloyd Harris (Spain) Carlos Alcaraz (Netherlands) Botic van de Zandschulp
30 Aug; 6 Sep	US Open; New York City, United States; Grand Slam; Hard – $26,562,000; 128S/128Q/64D/32X; Singles – Doubles – Mixed	(United States) Desirae Krawczyk (United Kingdom) Joe Salisbury; 7–5, 6–2	(Mexico) Giuliana Olmos (El Salvador) Marcelo Arévalo	(Germany) Alexander Zverev (Canada) Félix Auger-Aliassime	(Italy) Matteo Berrettini (South Africa) Lloyd Harris (Spain) Carlos Alcaraz (Netherlands) Botic van de Zandschulp

=== September ===
Week	Tournament	Champions	Runners-up	Semifinalists	Quarterfinalists
13 Sep	No tournaments scheduled.				
20 Sep	Laver Cup; Boston, United States; Hard (i) – $2,250,000	Team Europe; 14–1	Team World		
20 Sep	Astana Open; Astana, Kazakhstan; ATP 250; Hard (i) – $541,800 – 28S/16Q/16D; Singles – Doubles	(South Korea) Kwon Soon-woo; 7–6^{(8–6)}, 6–3	(Australia) James Duckworth	(Belarus) Ilya Ivashka (Kazakhstan) Alexander Bublik	(Finland) Emil Ruusuvuori (Australia) John Millman (Serbia) Laslo Đere (Spain) Carlos Taberner
20 Sep	Astana Open; Astana, Kazakhstan; ATP 250; Hard (i) – $541,800 – 28S/16Q/16D; Singles – Doubles	(Mexico) Santiago González (Argentina) Andrés Molteni; 6–1, 6–2	(Israel) Jonathan Erlich (Belarus) Andrei Vasilevski	(Belarus) Ilya Ivashka (Kazakhstan) Alexander Bublik	(Finland) Emil Ruusuvuori (Australia) John Millman (Serbia) Laslo Đere (Spain) Carlos Taberner
20 Sep	Moselle Open; Metz, France; ATP 250; Hard (i) – $481,270 – 28S/16Q/16D; Singles – Doubles	(Poland) Hubert Hurkacz; 7–6^{(7–2)}, 6–3	(Spain) Pablo Carreño Busta	(Germany) Peter Gojowczyk (France) Gaël Monfils	(United Kingdom) Andy Murray (United States) Marcos Giron (Georgia (country)) Nikoloz Basilashvili (Denmark) Holger Rune
20 Sep	Moselle Open; Metz, France; ATP 250; Hard (i) – $481,270 – 28S/16Q/16D; Singles – Doubles	(Poland) Hubert Hurkacz (Poland) Jan Zieliński; 7–5, 6–3	(Monaco) Hugo Nys (France) Arthur Rinderknech	(Germany) Peter Gojowczyk (France) Gaël Monfils	(United Kingdom) Andy Murray (United States) Marcos Giron (Georgia (country)) Nikoloz Basilashvili (Denmark) Holger Rune
27 Sep	San Diego Open; San Diego, United States; ATP 250; Hard – $600,000 – 28S/16Q/16D; Singles – Doubles	(Norway) Casper Ruud; 6–0, 6–2	(United Kingdom) Cameron Norrie	(Russia) Andrey Rublev (Bulgaria) Grigor Dimitrov	(Argentina) Diego Schwartzman (Canada) Denis Shapovalov (Russia) Aslan Karatsev (Italy) Lorenzo Sonego
27 Sep	San Diego Open; San Diego, United States; ATP 250; Hard – $600,000 – 28S/16Q/16D; Singles – Doubles	(United Kingdom) Joe Salisbury (United Kingdom) Neal Skupski; 7–6^{(7–2)}, 3–6, [10–5]	(Australia) John Peers (Slovakia) Filip Polášek	(Russia) Andrey Rublev (Bulgaria) Grigor Dimitrov	(Argentina) Diego Schwartzman (Canada) Denis Shapovalov (Russia) Aslan Karatsev (Italy) Lorenzo Sonego
27 Sep	Sofia Open; Sofia, Bulgaria; ATP 250; Hard (i) – €389,270 – 28S/16Q/16D; Singles – Doubles	(Italy) Jannik Sinner; 6–3, 6–4	(France) Gaël Monfils	(Serbia) Filip Krajinović (United States) Marcos Giron	(Australia) James Duckworth (Poland) Kamil Majchrzak (Australia) John Millman (Italy) Gianluca Mager
27 Sep	Sofia Open; Sofia, Bulgaria; ATP 250; Hard (i) – €389,270 – 28S/16Q/16D; Singles – Doubles	(United Kingdom) Jonny O'Mara (United Kingdom) Ken Skupski; 6–3, 6–4	(Austria) Oliver Marach (Austria) Philipp Oswald	(Serbia) Filip Krajinović (United States) Marcos Giron	(Australia) James Duckworth (Poland) Kamil Majchrzak (Australia) John Millman (Italy) Gianluca Mager

=== October ===
Week	Tournament	Champions	Runners-up	Semifinalists	Quarterfinalists
4 Oct; 11 Oct	Indian Wells Open; Indian Wells, United States; ATP Masters 1000; Hard – $8,359,455 – 96S/48Q/32D; Singles – Doubles	(United Kingdom) Cameron Norrie; 3–6, 6–4, 6–1	(Georgia (country)) Nikoloz Basilashvili	(Bulgaria) Grigor Dimitrov (United States) Taylor Fritz	(Poland) Hubert Hurkacz (Argentina) Diego Schwartzman (Germany) Alexander Zverev (Greece) Stefanos Tsitsipas
4 Oct; 11 Oct	Indian Wells Open; Indian Wells, United States; ATP Masters 1000; Hard – $8,359,455 – 96S/48Q/32D; Singles – Doubles	(Australia) John Peers (Slovakia) Filip Polášek; 6–3, 7–6^{(7–5)}	(Russia) Aslan Karatsev (Russia) Andrey Rublev	(Bulgaria) Grigor Dimitrov (United States) Taylor Fritz	(Poland) Hubert Hurkacz (Argentina) Diego Schwartzman (Germany) Alexander Zverev (Greece) Stefanos Tsitsipas
18 Oct	Kremlin Cup; Moscow, Russia; ATP 250; Hard (i) – $779,515 – 28S/16Q/16D; Singles – Doubles	(Russia) Aslan Karatsev; 6–2, 6–4	(Croatia) Marin Čilić	(Lithuania) Ričardas Berankis (Russia) Karen Khachanov	(France) Adrian Mannarino (Spain) Pedro Martínez (Australia) John Millman (France) Gilles Simon
18 Oct	Kremlin Cup; Moscow, Russia; ATP 250; Hard (i) – $779,515 – 28S/16Q/16D; Singles – Doubles	(Finland) Harri Heliövaara (Netherlands) Matwé Middelkoop; 7–5, 4–6, [11–9]	(Bosnia and Herzegovina) Tomislav Brkić (Serbia) Nikola Ćaćić	(Lithuania) Ričardas Berankis (Russia) Karen Khachanov	(France) Adrian Mannarino (Spain) Pedro Martínez (Australia) John Millman (France) Gilles Simon
18 Oct	European Open; Antwerp, Belgium; ATP 250; Hard (i) – €584,125 – 28S/16Q/16D; Singles – Doubles	(Italy) Jannik Sinner; 6–2, 6–2	(Argentina) Diego Schwartzman	(South Africa) Lloyd Harris (United States) Jenson Brooksby	(France) Arthur Rinderknech (Hungary) Márton Fucsovics (Spain) Alejandro Davidovich; Fokina (United States) Brandon Nakashima
18 Oct	European Open; Antwerp, Belgium; ATP 250; Hard (i) – €584,125 – 28S/16Q/16D; Singles – Doubles	(France) Nicolas Mahut (France) Fabrice Martin; 6–0, 6–1	(Netherlands) Wesley Koolhof (Netherlands) Jean-Julien Rojer	(South Africa) Lloyd Harris (United States) Jenson Brooksby	(France) Arthur Rinderknech (Hungary) Márton Fucsovics (Spain) Alejandro Davidovich; Fokina (United States) Brandon Nakashima
25 Oct	Vienna Open; Vienna, Austria; ATP 500; Hard (i) – €1,974,510 – 32S/16Q/16D; Singles – Doubles	(Germany) Alexander Zverev; 7–5, 6–4	(United States) Frances Tiafoe	(Italy) Jannik Sinner (Spain) Carlos Alcaraz	(Argentina) Diego Schwartzman (Norway) Casper Ruud (Italy) Matteo Berrettini (Canada) Félix Auger-Aliassime
25 Oct	Vienna Open; Vienna, Austria; ATP 500; Hard (i) – €1,974,510 – 32S/16Q/16D; Singles – Doubles	(Colombia) Juan Sebastián Cabal (Colombia) Robert Farah; 6–4, 6–2	(United States) Rajeev Ram (United Kingdom) Joe Salisbury	(Italy) Jannik Sinner (Spain) Carlos Alcaraz	(Argentina) Diego Schwartzman (Norway) Casper Ruud (Italy) Matteo Berrettini (Canada) Félix Auger-Aliassime
25 Oct	St. Petersburg Open; St. Petersburg, Russia; ATP 250; Hard (i) – $932,370 – 28S/16Q/16D; Singles – Doubles	(Croatia) Marin Čilić; 7–6^{(7–3)}, 4–6, 6–4	(United States) Taylor Fritz	(Netherlands) Botic van de Zandschulp (Germany) Jan-Lennard Struff	(Russia) Andrey Rublev (Spain) Roberto Bautista Agut (Australia) John Millman (Canada) Denis Shapovalov
25 Oct	St. Petersburg Open; St. Petersburg, Russia; ATP 250; Hard (i) – $932,370 – 28S/16Q/16D; Singles – Doubles	(United Kingdom) Jamie Murray (Brazil) Bruno Soares; 6–3, 6–4	(Kazakhstan) Andrey Golubev (Monaco) Hugo Nys	(Netherlands) Botic van de Zandschulp (Germany) Jan-Lennard Struff	(Russia) Andrey Rublev (Spain) Roberto Bautista Agut (Australia) John Millman (Canada) Denis Shapovalov

=== November ===
Week	Tournament	Champions	Runners-up	Semifinalists	Quarterfinalists
1 Nov	Paris Masters; Paris, France; ATP Masters 1000; Hard (i) – €2,603,700 – 56S/28Q/24D; Singles – Doubles	(Serbia) Novak Djokovic; 4–6, 6–3, 6–3	(Russia) Daniil Medvedev	(Poland) Hubert Hurkacz (Germany) Alexander Zverev	(United States) Taylor Fritz (Australia) James Duckworth (Norway) Casper Ruud (France) Hugo Gaston
1 Nov	Paris Masters; Paris, France; ATP Masters 1000; Hard (i) – €2,603,700 – 56S/28Q/24D; Singles – Doubles	(Germany) Tim Pütz (New Zealand) Michael Venus; 6–3, 6–7^{(4–7)}, [11–9]	(France) Pierre-Hugues Herbert (France) Nicolas Mahut	(Poland) Hubert Hurkacz (Germany) Alexander Zverev	(United States) Taylor Fritz (Australia) James Duckworth (Norway) Casper Ruud (France) Hugo Gaston
8 Nov	Stockholm Open; Stockholm, Sweden; ATP 250; Hard (i) – €635,750 – 28S/16Q/16D; Singles – Doubles	(United States) Tommy Paul; 6–4, 2–6, 6–4	(Canada) Denis Shapovalov	(United States) Frances Tiafoe (Canada) Félix Auger-Aliassime	(United Kingdom) Andy Murray (United Kingdom) Dan Evans (France) Arthur Rinderknech (Netherlands) Botic van de Zandschulp
8 Nov	Stockholm Open; Stockholm, Sweden; ATP 250; Hard (i) – €635,750 – 28S/16Q/16D; Singles – Doubles	(Mexico) Santiago González (Argentina) Andrés Molteni; 6–2, 6–2	(Pakistan) Aisam-ul-Haq Qureshi (Netherlands) Jean-Julien Rojer	(United States) Frances Tiafoe (Canada) Félix Auger-Aliassime	(United Kingdom) Andy Murray (United Kingdom) Dan Evans (France) Arthur Rinderknech (Netherlands) Botic van de Zandschulp
8 Nov	Next Gen ATP Finals; Milan, Italy; Next Generation ATP Finals; Hard (i) – $1,300,000 – 8S (RR); Singles	(Spain) Carlos Alcaraz; 4–3^{(7–5)}, 4–2, 4–2	(United States) Sebastian Korda	(Argentina) Sebastián Báez (United States) Brandon Nakashima	Round robin (Argentina) Juan Manuel Cerúndolo (France) Hugo Gaston (Italy) Lorenzo Musetti (Denmark) Holger Rune
15 Nov	ATP Finals; Turin, Italy; ATP Finals; Hard (i) – $7,250,000 – 8S/8D (RR); Singles – Doubles	(Germany) Alexander Zverev; 6–4, 6–4	(Russia) Daniil Medvedev	(Serbia) Novak Djokovic (Norway) Casper Ruud	Round robin (Italy) Matteo Berrettini (Poland) Hubert Hurkacz (United Kingdom) Cameron Norrie (Russia) Andrey Rublev (Italy) Jannik Sinner (Greece) Stefanos Tsitsipas
15 Nov	ATP Finals; Turin, Italy; ATP Finals; Hard (i) – $7,250,000 – 8S/8D (RR); Singles – Doubles	(France) Pierre-Hugues Herbert (France) Nicolas Mahut; 6–4, 7–6^{(7–0)}	(United States) Rajeev Ram (United Kingdom) Joe Salisbury	(Serbia) Novak Djokovic (Norway) Casper Ruud	Round robin (Italy) Matteo Berrettini (Poland) Hubert Hurkacz (United Kingdom) Cameron Norrie (Russia) Andrey Rublev (Italy) Jannik Sinner (Greece) Stefanos Tsitsipas
22 Nov; 29 Nov	Davis Cup Finals; Madrid, Spain; Turin, Italy; Innsbruck, Austria; Hard (i)	RTF; 2–0	Croatia	Germany; Serbia	Sweden; Great Britain; Italy; Kazakhstan

=== Affected tournaments ===
The COVID-19 pandemic affected tournaments on both the ATP and WTA tours. The following tournaments were cancelled or postponed due to the COVID-19 pandemic.

Week of	Tournament	Status
4 Jan	ATP Cup; Brisbane, Perth, Sydney, Australia; Hard – 24 teams	Postponed to 1 February, reduced to 12 teams, and moved to Melbourne
4 Jan	Qatar Open; Doha, Qatar; ATP 250; Hard	Postponed to 8 March
11 Jan	Auckland Open; Auckland, New Zealand; ATP 250; Hard	Cancelled
11 Jan	Adelaide International; Adelaide, Australia; ATP 250; Hard	Postponed to 1 February and moved to Melbourne
18 Jan; 25 Jan	Australian Open; Melbourne, Australia; Grand Slam; Hard	Postponed to 8 February
1 Feb	Maharashtra Open; Pune, India; ATP 250; Hard	Cancelled
1 Feb	Córdoba Open; Córdoba, Argentina; ATP 250; Clay	Postponed to 22 February
1 Feb	Open Sud de France Montpellier, France; ATP 250; Hard (i)	Postponed to 22 February
8 Feb	Rotterdam Open; Rotterdam, Netherlands; ATP 500; Hard (i)	Postponed to 1 March
8 Feb	Argentina Open; Buenos Aires, Argentina; ATP 250; Clay	Postponed to 1 March
15 Feb	Rio Open; Rio de Janeiro, Brazil; ATP 500 Clay (red)	Cancelled
8 Mar; 15 Mar	Indian Wells Open; Indian Wells, United States; ATP Masters 1000; Hard	Postponed to 4 October
5 Apr	U.S. Men's Clay Court Championships; Houston, United States; ATP 250; Clay (maroon)	Cancelled
5 Apr	Grand Prix Hassan II; Marrakesh, Morocco; ATP 250; Clay (red)	Cancelled
24 May	French Open; Paris, France; Grand Slam; Clay (red)	Postponed to 31 May
7 Jun	Rosmalen Grass Court Championships 's-Hertogenbosch, Netherlands; ATP 250; Grass	Cancelled
27 Sep	Chengdu Open; Chengdu, China; ATP 250; Hard	Cancelled
27 Sep	Zhuhai Championships; Zhuhai, China; ATP 250; Hard	Cancelled
4 Oct	China Open; Beijing, China; ATP 500; Hard	Cancelled
4 Oct	Japan Open; Tokyo, Japan; ATP 500; Hard	Cancelled
11 Oct	Shanghai Masters; Shanghai, China; ATP Masters 1000; Hard	Cancelled
25 Oct	Swiss Indoors; Basel, Switzerland; ATP 500; Hard (i)	Cancelled

== Statistical information ==
These tables present the number of singles (S), doubles (D), and mixed doubles (X) titles won by each player and each nation during the season, within all the tournament categories of the 2021 ATP Tour: the Grand Slam tournaments, the ATP Finals, the ATP Masters 1000, the ATP 500 series, and the ATP 250 series. The players/nations are sorted by:

1. Total number of titles (a doubles title won by two players representing the same nation counts as only one win for the nation);
2. Cumulated importance of those titles (one Grand Slam win equalling two Masters 1000 wins, one undefeated ATP Finals win equalling one-and-a-half Masters 1000 win, one Masters 1000 win equalling two 500 events wins, one 500 event win equalling two 250 events wins);
3. A singles > doubles > mixed doubles hierarchy;
4. Alphabetical order (by family names for players).

Key
Grand Slam
Summer Olympics
ATP Finals
ATP Masters 1000
ATP 500
ATP 250

=== Titles won by player ===
Total	Player	Grand Slam			Olympic Games			ATP Finals		Masters 1000		Tour 500		Tour 250		Total		
Total	Player	S	D	X	S	D	X	S	D	S	D	S	D	S	D	S	D	X
9	Nikola Mektić (CRO)		●			●					● ● ●		●		● ● ●	0	9	0
9	Mate Pavić (CRO)		●			●					● ● ●		●		● ● ●	0	9	0
6	Alexander Zverev (GER)				●			●		● ●		● ●				6	0	0
5	Novak Djokovic (SRB)	● ● ●								●				●		5	0	0
5	Joe Salisbury (GBR)		●	● ●							●				●	0	3	2
5	Jannik Sinner (ITA)											●		● ● ●	●	4	1	0
5	Casper Ruud (NOR)													● ● ● ● ●		5	0	0
4	Daniil Medvedev (RUS)	●								●				● ●		4	0	0
4	Nicolas Mahut (FRA)		●						●				●		●	0	4	0
4	Hubert Hurkacz (POL)									●				● ●	●	3	1	0
4	Tim Pütz (GER)										●		●		● ●	0	4	0
3	Rajeev Ram (USA)		●	●							●					0	2	1
3	Pierre-Hugues Herbert (FRA)		●						●				●			0	3	0
3	Neal Skupski (GBR)			●									●		●	0	2	1
3	Andrey Rublev (RUS)						●					●			●	1	1	1
3	Michael Venus (NZL)										●		●		●	0	3	0
3	Juan Sebastián Cabal (COL)												● ● ●			0	3	0
3	Robert Farah (COL)												● ● ●			0	3	0
3	Aslan Karatsev (RUS)											●		●	●	2	1	0
3	Simone Bolelli (ITA)														● ● ●	0	3	0
3	Máximo González (ARG)														● ● ●	0	3	0
3	Santiago González (MEX)														● ● ●	0	3	0
2	Filip Polášek (SVK)		●								●					0	2	0
2	Marcel Granollers (ESP)										● ●					0	2	0
2	Horacio Zeballos (ARG)										● ●					0	2	0
2	Rafael Nadal (ESP)									●		●				2	0	0
2	Cameron Norrie (GBR)									●				●		2	0	0
2	Stefanos Tsitsipas (GRE)									●				●		2	0	0
2	John Peers (AUS)										●				●	0	2	0
2	Matteo Berrettini (ITA)											●		●		2	0	0
2	Pablo Carreño Busta (ESP)											●		●		2	0	0
2	Kevin Krawietz (GER)												●		●	0	2	0
2	Ken Skupski (GBR)												●		●	0	2	0
2	Nikoloz Basilashvili (GEO)													● ●		2	0	0
2	Marin Čilić (CRO)													● ●		2	0	0
2	Alex de Minaur (AUS)													● ●		2	0	0
2	John Isner (USA)													●	●	1	1	0
2	Lorenzo Sonego (ITA)													●	●	1	1	0
2	Ariel Behar (URU)														● ●	0	2	0
2	Gonzalo Escobar (ECU)														● ●	0	2	0
2	Harri Heliövaara (FIN)														● ●	0	2	0
2	Matwé Middelkoop (NED)														● ●	0	2	0
2	Andrés Molteni (ARG)														● ●	0	2	0
2	Jamie Murray (GBR)														● ●	0	2	0
2	Hugo Nys (MON)														● ●	0	2	0
2	Bruno Soares (BRA)														● ●	0	2	0
1	Ivan Dodig (CRO)		●													0	1	0
1	Ugo Humbert (FRA)											●				1	0	0
1	Raven Klaasen (RSA)												●			0	1	0
1	Ben McLachlan (JPN)												●			0	1	0
1	Horia Tecău (ROU)												●			0	1	0
1	Carlos Alcaraz (ESP)													●		1	0	0
1	Kevin Anderson (RSA)													●		1	0	0
1	Juan Manuel Cerúndolo (ARG)													●		1	0	0
1	Dan Evans (GBR)													●		1	0	0
1	Cristian Garín (CHI)													●		1	0	0
1	David Goffin (BEL)													●		1	0	0
1	Ilya Ivashka (BLR)													●		1	0	0
1	Sebastian Korda (USA)													●		1	0	0
1	Kwon Soon-woo (KOR)													●		1	0	0
1	Tommy Paul (USA)													●		1	0	0
1	Alexei Popyrin (AUS)													●		1	0	0
1	Diego Schwartzman (ARG)													●		1	0	0
1	Albert Ramos Viñolas (ESP)													●		1	0	0
1	Sander Arends (NED)														●	0	1	0
1	Marcelo Arévalo (ESA)														●	0	1	0
1	William Blumberg (USA)														●	0	1	0
1	Tomislav Brkić (BIH)														●	0	1	0
1	Nikola Ćaćić (SRB)														●	0	1	0
1	Marcelo Demoliner (BRA)														●	0	1	0
1	Alexander Erler (AUT)														●	0	1	0
1	Jonathan Erlich (ISR)														●	0	1	0
1	Sander Gillé (BEL)														●	0	1	0
1	Lloyd Glasspool (GBR)														●	0	1	0
1	Hans Hach Verdugo (MEX)														●	0	1	0
1	Marc-Andrea Hüsler (SUI)														●	0	1	0
1	Henri Kontinen (FIN)														●	0	1	0
1	Wesley Koolhof (NED)														●	0	1	0
1	Fabrice Martin (FRA)														●	0	1	0
1	Rafael Matos (BRA)														●	0	1	0
1	Felipe Meligeni Alves (BRA)														●	0	1	0
1	Lucas Miedler (AUT)														●	0	1	0
1	Jonny O'Mara (GBR)														●	0	1	0
1	Reilly Opelka (USA)														●	0	1	0
1	David Pel (NED)														●	0	1	0
1	Édouard Roger-Vasselin (FRA)														●	0	1	0
1	Fernando Romboli (BRA)														●	0	1	0
1	Ivan Sabanov (CRO)														●	0	1	0
1	Matej Sabanov (CRO)														●	0	1	0
1	Jack Sock (USA)														●	0	1	0
1	Dominic Stricker (SUI)														●	0	1	0
1	Andrei Vasilevski (BLR)														●	0	1	0
1	Andrea Vavassori (ITA)														●	0	1	0
1	David Vega Hernández (ESP)														●	0	1	0
1	Joran Vliegen (BEL)														●	0	1	0
1	Jan Zieliński (POL)														●	0	1	0

=== Titles won by nation ===
Total	Nation	Grand Slam			Olympic Games			ATP Finals		Masters 1000		Tour 500		Tour 250		Total		
Total	Nation	S	D	X	S	D	X	S	D	S	D	S	D	S	D	S	D	X
14	Great Britain (GBR)		1	3						1	1		1	2	5	3	8	3
13	Croatia (CRO)		2			1					3		1	2	4	2	11	0
12	Germany (GER)				1			1		2	1	2	2		3	6	6	0
12	Italy (ITA)											2		5	5	7	5	0
9	United States (USA)		1	1							1			3	3	3	5	1
9	Russia (RUS)	1					1			1		2		3	1	7	1	1
9	Spain (ESP)									1	2	2		3	1	6	3	0
9	Argentina (ARG)										2			2	5	2	7	0
6	Serbia (SRB)	3								1				1	1	5	1	0
6	France (FRA)		1						1			1	1		2	1	5	0
5	Australia (AUS)										1			3	1	3	2	0
5	Norway (NOR)													5		5	0	0
5	Brazil (BRA)														5	0	5	0
4	Poland (POL)									1				2	1	3	1	0
4	Mexico (MEX)														4	0	4	0
4	Netherlands (NED)														4	0	4	0
3	New Zealand (NZL)										1		1		1	0	3	0
3	Colombia (COL)												3			0	3	0
3	Finland (FIN)														3	0	3	0
2	Slovakia (SVK)		1								1					0	2	0
2	Greece (GRE)									1				1		2	0	0
2	South Africa (RSA)												1	1		1	1	0
2	Georgia (GEO)													2		2	0	0
2	Belarus (BLR)													1	1	1	1	0
2	Belgium (BEL)													1	1	1	1	0
2	Ecuador (ECU)														2	0	2	0
2	Monaco (MON)														2	0	2	0
2	Uruguay (URU)														2	0	2	0
1	Japan (JPN)												1			0	1	0
1	Romania (ROU)												1			0	1	0
1	Chile (CHI)													1		1	0	0
1	South Korea (KOR)													1		1	0	0
1	Austria (AUT)														1	0	1	0
1	Bosnia and Herzegovina (BIH)														1	0	1	0
1	El Salvador (ESA)														1	0	1	0
1	Israel (ISR)														1	0	1	0
1	Switzerland (SUI)														1	0	1	0

=== Titles information ===
The following players won their first main circuit title in singles, doubles or mixed doubles:

Singles

- (United Kingdom) Dan Evans (30 years, 259 days) – Melbourne 2 (draw)
- (Australia) Alexei Popyrin (21 years, 207 days) – Singapore (draw)
- (Argentina) Juan Manuel Cerúndolo (19 years, 105 days) – Córdoba (draw)
- (Russia) Aslan Karatsev (27 years, 197 days) – Dubai (draw)
- (United States) Sebastian Korda (20 years, 328 days) – Parma (draw)
- (United Kingdom) Cameron Norrie (25 years, 335 days) – Los Cabos (draw)
- (Spain) Carlos Alcaraz (18 years, 81 days) – Umag (draw)
- (Belarus) Ilya Ivashka (27 years, 185 days) – Winston-Salem (draw)
- (South Korea) Kwon Soon-woo (23 years, 298 days) – Nur Sultan (draw)
- (United States) Tommy Paul (24 years, 180 days) – Stockholm (draw)

Doubles

- (Uruguay) Ariel Behar – Delray Beach (draw)
- (Ecuador) Gonzalo Escobar – Delray Beach (draw)
- (Brazil) Rafael Matos – Córdoba (draw)
- (Brazil) Felipe Meligeni Alves – Córdoba (draw)
- (Bosnia and Herzegovina) Tomislav Brkić – Buenos Aires (draw)
- (Russia) Aslan Karatsev – Doha (draw)
- (United Kingdom) Lloyd Glasspool – Marseille (draw)
- (Finland) Harri Heliövaara – Marseille (draw)
- (Italy) Lorenzo Sonego – Cagliari (draw)
- (Italy) Andrea Vavassori – Cagliari (draw)
- (Croatia) Ivan Sabanov – Belgrade (draw)
- (Croatia) Matej Sabanov – Belgrade (draw)
- (Belarus) Andrei Vasilevski – Belgrade 2 (draw)
- (Netherlands) Sander Arends – Båstad (draw)
- (Netherlands) David Pel – Båstad (draw)
- (United States) William Blumberg – Newport (draw)
- (Brazil) Fernando Romboli – Umag (draw)
- (Spain) David Vega Hernández – Umag (draw)
- (Mexico) Hans Hach Verdugo – Los Cabos (draw)
- (Switzerland) Marc-Andrea Hüsler – Gstaad (draw)
- (Switzerland) Dominic Stricker – Gstaad (draw)
- (Austria) Alexander Erler – Kitzbühel (draw)
- (Austria) Lucas Miedler – Kitzbühel (draw)
- (United States) Reilly Opelka – Atlanta (draw)
- (Italy) Jannik Sinner – Atlanta (draw)
- (Poland) Jan Zieliński – Metz (draw)

Mixed Doubles

- (United Kingdom) Joe Salisbury – **French Open (draw)**
- (United Kingdom) Neal Skupski – **Wimbledon (draw)**
- Andrey Rublev (ROC) – 2020 Summer Olympics (draw)

The following players defended a main circuit title in singles, doubles, or mixed doubles:

Singles

- (Serbia) Novak Djokovic – **Australian Open (draw)**, **Wimbledon (draw)**
- (Italy) Jannik Sinner – Sofia (draw)

Doubles

- (Croatia) Nikola Mektić – Monte-Carlo (draw)
- (Colombia) Juan Sebastián Cabal – Barcelona (draw)
- (Colombia) Robert Farah – Barcelona (draw)
- (New Zealand) Michael Venus – Hamburg (draw)
- (South Africa) Raven Klaasen – Washington (draw)

=== Best ranking ===
The following players achieved their career high ranking in this season inside top 50 (in bold the players who entered the top 10 for the first time):

Singles

- (Serbia) Miomir Kecmanović (reached No. 38 on March 8)
- (Russia) Daniil Medvedev (reached **No. 2** on March 15)
- (France) Ugo Humbert (reached No. 25 on June 21)
- (Australia) Alex de Minaur (reached No. 15 on June 28)
- (Greece) Stefanos Tsitsipas (reached **No. 3** on August 9)
- (Spain) Alejandro Davidovich Fokina (reached No. 32 on August 30)
- (Russia) Andrey Rublev (reached **No. 5** on September 13)
- (Italy) Matteo Berrettini (reached **No. 7** on September 13)
- (Chile) Cristian Garín (reached No. 17 on September 13)
- (United States) Reilly Opelka (reached No. 19 on September 13)
- (South Africa) Lloyd Harris (reached No. 31 on September 13)
- (Kazakhstan) Alexander Bublik (reached No. 34 on September 13)
- (United Kingdom) Dan Evans (reached No. 22 on September 27)
- (Italy) Lorenzo Sonego (reached No. 21 on October 4)
- (United States) Sebastian Korda (reached No. 38 on October 18)
- (Belarus) Ilya Ivashka (reached No. 43 on October 18)
- (Norway) **Casper Ruud** (reached **No. 8** on October 25)
- (Italy) **Jannik Sinner** (reached **No. 9** on November 1)
- (South Korea) Kwon Soon-woo (reached No. 52 on November 1)
- (Poland) **Hubert Hurkacz** (reached **No. 9** on November 8)
- (United Kingdom) Cameron Norrie (reached No. 12 on November 8)
- (Russia) Aslan Karatsev (reached No. 15 on November 8)
- (United States) Taylor Fritz (reached No. 23 on November 8)
- (Spain) Carlos Alcaraz (reached No. 32 on November 8)
- (Australia) James Duckworth (reached No. 47 on November 8)
- (Canada) **Félix Auger-Aliassime** (reached **No. 10** on November 15)
- (United States) Tommy Paul (reached No. 43 on November 15)

Doubles

- (Belgium) Joran Vliegen (reached No. 28 on June 14)
- (Austria) Philipp Oswald (reached No. 31 on June 21)
- (United Kingdom) Neal Skupski (reached No. 14 on August 9)
- (United States) Rajeev Ram (reached **No. 4** on September 20)
- (Netherlands) Matwé Middelkoop (reached No. 26 on October 4)
- (Croatia) Nikola Mektić (reached **No. 1** on October 18)
- (Australia) Max Purcell (reached No. 28 on October 18)
- (Poland) Hubert Hurkacz (reached No. 44 on October 25)
- (Australia) Luke Saville (reached No. 23 on November 8)
- (Belgium) Sander Gillé (reached No. 24 on November 8)
- (Kazakhstan) Andrey Golubev (reached No. 25 on November 8)
- (El Salvador) Marcelo Arévalo (reached No. 31 on November 8)
- (Serbia) Nikola Ćaćić (reached No. 35 on November 8)
- (Monaco) Hugo Nys (reached No. 41 on November 8)
- (Bosnia and Herzegovina) Tomislav Brkić (reached No. 46 on November 8)
- (Kazakhstan) Alexander Bublik (reached No. 47 on November 8)
- (Germany) Tim Pütz (reached No. 17 on November 15)
- (Ecuador) Gonzalo Escobar (reached No. 38 on November 15)
- (Uruguay) Ariel Behar (reached No. 41 on November 15)

== ATP ranking ==
These are the ATP rankings and yearly ATP race rankings of the top 20 singles players, doubles players and doubles teams at the current date of the 2021 season.

=== Singles ===
Final Singles Race Rankings
#	Player	Points	Tours
1	Novak Djokovic (SRB)	9,370	10
2	Daniil Medvedev (RUS)	7,070	16
3	Alexander Zverev (GER)	5,955	17
4	Stefanos Tsitsipas (GRE)	5,695	20
5	Andrey Rublev (RUS)	4,210	21
6	Matteo Berrettini (ITA)	4,090	14
7	Hubert Hurkacz (POL)	3,315	22
8	Casper Ruud (NOR)	3,275	21
9	Jannik Sinner (ITA)	3,015	24
10	Rafael Nadal (ESP)	2,985	7
11	Cameron Norrie (GBR)	2,945	24
12	Félix Auger-Aliassime (CAN)	2,545	22
13	Aslan Karatsev (RUS)	2,290	21
14	Denis Shapovalov (CAN)	2,030	21
15	Diego Schwartzman (ARG)	1,990	21
16	Pablo Carreño Busta (ESP)	1,970	19
17	Nikoloz Basilashvili (GEO)	1,920	28
18	Roberto Bautista Agut (ESP)	1,685	24
19	Taylor Fritz (USA)	1,580	22
20	Reilly Opelka (USA)	1,550	21

Competed at the 2021 ATP Finals.

Year-end rankings 2021 (27 December 2021)
#	Player	Points	#Trn	'20 Rk	High	Low	'20→'21
1	Novak Djokovic (SRB)	11,540	14	1	1	1	Steady
2	Daniil Medvedev (RUS)	8,640	23	4	2	4	▲2
3	Alexander Zverev (GER)	7,840	23	7	3	7	▲4
4	Stefanos Tsitsipas (GRE)	6,540	26	6	3	6	▲2
5	Andrey Rublev (RUS)	5,150	28	8	5	8	▲3
6	Rafael Nadal (ESP)	4,875	11	2	2	6	▼4
7	Matteo Berrettini (ITA)	4,568	21	10	7	10	▲3
8	Casper Ruud (NOR)	4,160	35	27	8	28	▲19
9	Hubert Hurkacz (POL)	3,706	32	34	9	37	▲25
10	Jannik Sinner (ITA)	3,350	42	37	9	36	▲27
11	Félix Auger-Aliassime (CAN)	3,308	28	21	10	22	▲10
12	Cameron Norrie (GBR)	2,945	31	71	12	74	▲59
13	Diego Schwartzman (ARG)	2,625	25	9	9	16	▼4
14	Denis Shapovalov (CAN)	2,475	28	12	10	19	▼2
15	Dominic Thiem (AUT)	2,425	15	3	3	15	▼12
16	Roger Federer (SUI)	2,385	8	5	5	16	▼11
17	Cristian Garín (CHI)	2,353	30	22	17	25	▲5
18	Aslan Karatsev (RUS)	2,351	40	112	15	114	▲94
19	Roberto Bautista Agut (ESP)	2,260	27	13	10	21	▼6
20	Pablo Carreño Busta (ESP)	2,230	25	16	11	20	▼4

==== No. 1 ranking ====
Holder	Date gained	Date forfeited
Novak Djokovic (SRB)	Year end 2020	Year end 2021

=== Doubles ===
Final Doubles Team Race Rankings
#	Team	Points	Tours
1	Mate Pavić (CRO); Nikola Mektić (CRO)	9,275	20
2	Rajeev Ram (USA); Joe Salisbury (GBR)	8,140	19
3	Pierre-Hugues Herbert (FRA); Nicolas Mahut (FRA)	5,990	13
4	Marcel Granollers (ESP); Horacio Zeballos (ARG)	4,935	14
5	Juan Sebastián Cabal (COL); Robert Farah (COL)	4,460	21
6	Ivan Dodig (CRO); Filip Polášek (SVK)	3,430	13
7	Kevin Krawietz (GER); Horia Tecău (ROU)	3,310	15
8	Jamie Murray (GBR); Bruno Soares (BRA)	3,230	16
9	John Peers (AUS); Filip Polášek (SVK)	2,500	8
10	Simone Bolelli (ITA); Máximo González (ARG)	2,385	19

Competed at the 2021 ATP Finals.

Year-end rankings 2021 (27 December 2021)
#	Player	Points	#Trn	'20 Rank	High	Low	'20→'21
1	Mate Pavić (CRO)	10,265	29	4	1	4	▲3
2	Nikola Mektić (CRO)	9,830	29	8	1	8	▲6
3	Joe Salisbury (GBR)	9,610	27	12	3	15	▲9
4	Rajeev Ram (USA)	9,400	26	14	4	17	▲10
5	Nicolas Mahut (FRA)	7,735	26	6	2	8	▲1
6	Horacio Zeballos (ARG)	7,100	22	3	3	8	▼3
7	Marcel Granollers (ESP)	7,043	23	9	5	13	▲2
8	Pierre-Hugues Herbert (FRA)	6,660	20	23	5	25	▲15
9	Filip Polášek (SVK)	6,460	32	17	8	17	▲8
10T	Juan Sebastián Cabal (COL)	5,525	25	2	2	15	▼8
10T	Robert Farah (COL)	5,525	25	1	1	12	▼9
12	Ivan Dodig (CRO)	5,165	31	16	7	16	▲4
13	John Peers (AUS)	5,080	27	28	12	28	▲15
14	Kevin Krawietz (GER)	4,698	32	19	11	20	▲5
15	Michael Venus (NZL)	4,511	25	13	13	21	▼2
16	Bruno Soares (BRA)	4,465	24	7	4	16	▼9
17	Horia Tecău (ROU)	4,410	22	22	15	24	▲5
18	Tim Pütz (GER)	4,218	28	61	17	62	▲43
19	Jamie Murray (GBR)	4,108	31	24	17	24	▲5
20	Neal Skupski (GBR)	3,578	35	27	14	27	▲7

==== No. 1 ranking ====
Holder	Date gained	Date forfeited
Robert Farah (COL)	Year end 2020	4 April 2021
Mate Pavić (CRO)	5 April 2021	17 October 2021
Nikola Mektić (CRO)	18 October 2021	7 November 2021
Mate Pavić (CRO)	8 November 2021	Year end 2021

== Point distribution ==
Points are awarded as follows:

Category	W	F	SF	QF	R16	R32	R64	R128	Q	Q3	Q2	Q1
Grand Slam (128S)	2000	1200	720	360	180	90	45	10	25	16	8	0
Grand Slam (64D)	2000	1200	720	360	180	90	0	–	25	–	0	0
ATP Finals (8S/8D)	1500 (max) 1100 (min)	1000 (max) 600 (min)	600 (max); 200 (min)	200 for each round robin match win, +400 for a semifinal win, +500 for the final win.								
ATP Masters 1000 (96S)	1000	600	360	180	90	45	25	10	16	–	8	0
ATP Masters 1000 (56S/48S)	1000	600	360	180	90	45	10	–	25	–	16	0
ATP Masters 1000 (32D)	1000	600	360	180	90	0	–	–	–	–	–	–
Summer Olympics (64S)	–	–	–	–	–	–	–	–	–	–	–	–
ATP 500 (48S)	500	300	180	90	45	20	0	–	10	–	4	0
ATP 500 (32S)	500	300	180	90	45	0	–	–	20	–	10	0
ATP 500 (16D)	500	300	180	90	0	–	–	–	45	–	25	0
ATP 250 (56S/48S)	250	150	90	45	20	10	0	–	5	–	3	0
ATP 250 (32S/28S)	250	150	90	45	20	0	–	–	12	–	6	0
ATP 250 (16D)	250	150	90	45	0	–	–	–	–	–	–	–
ATP Cup	S 500 (max) D 250 (max)	For details, see 2021 ATP Cup										

== Prize money leaders ==
Prize money in US$ as of 22 November 2021
#	Player	Singles	Doubles	Year-to-date
1	Novak Djokovic (SRB)	$9,069,225	$31,322	$9,100,547
2	Daniil Medvedev (RUS)	$7,466,284	$14,987	$7,481,271
3	Alexander Zverev (GER)	$6,361,173	$59,171	$6,420,344
4	Stefanos Tsitsipas (GRE)	$3,503,608	$75,547	$3,579,155
5	Andrey Rublev (RUS)	$3,131,467	$199,911	$3,331,378
6	Matteo Berrettini (ITA)	$3,201,126	$30,782	$3,231,908
7	Cameron Norrie (GBR)	$2,518,782	$105,099	$2,623,881
8	Casper Ruud (NOR)	$2,230,592	$84,037	$2,314,629
9	Hubert Hurkacz (POL)	$2,173,247	$140,042	$2,313,289
10	Jannik Sinner (ITA)	$2,159,534	$73,665	$2,233,199

== Best matches by ATPTour.com ==
=== Best 5 Grand Slam tournament matches ===
	Event	Round	Surface	Winner	Opponent	Result
1.	French Open	SF	Clay	(Serbia) Novak Djokovic	(Spain) Rafael Nadal	3–6, 6–3, 7–6^{(7–4)}, 6–2
2.	US Open	SF	Hard	(Serbia) Novak Djokovic	(Germany) Alexander Zverev	4–6, 6–2, 6–4, 4–6, 6–2
3.	US Open	R3	Hard	(United States) Frances Tiafoe	(Russia) Andrey Rublev	4–6, 6–3, 7–6^{(8–6)}, 4–6, 6–1
4.	Australian Open	R2	Hard	(Greece) Stefanos Tsitsipas	(Australia) Thanasi Kokkinakis	6–7^{(5–7)}, 6–4, 6–1, 6–7^{(5–7)}, 6–4
5.	Wimbledon	R2	Grass	(United Kingdom) Andy Murray	(Germany) Oscar Otte	6–3, 4–6, 4–6, 6–4, 6–2

=== Best 5 ATP Tour matches ===
	Event	Round	Surface	Winner	Opponent	Result
1.	Barcelona Open	F	Clay	(Spain) Rafael Nadal	(Greece) Stefanos Tsitsipas	6–4, 6–7^{(6–8)}, 7–5
2.	ATP Finals	RR	Hard (i)	(Russia) Daniil Medvedev	(Germany) Alexander Zverev	6–3, 6–7^{(3–7)}, 7–6^{(8–6)}
3.	European Open	R1	Hard (i)	(United Kingdom) Andy Murray	(United States) Frances Tiafoe	7–6^{(7–2)}, 6–7^{(7–9)}, 7–6^{(10–8)}
4.	Serbia Open	SF	Clay	(Russia) Aslan Karatsev	(Serbia) Novak Djokovic	7–5, 4–6, 6–4
5.	Paris Masters	F	Hard (i)	(Serbia) Novak Djokovic	(Russia) Daniil Medvedev	4–6, 6–3, 6–3

== Retirements ==
The following is a list of notable players (winners of a main tour title, and/or part of the ATP rankings top 100 in singles, or top 100 in doubles, for at least one week) who announced their retirement from professional tennis, became inactive (after not playing for more than 52 weeks), or were permanently banned from playing, during the 2021 season:

- Alexandr Dolgopolov (born 7 November 1988 in Kyiv, Ukraine) joined the professional tour in 2006 and reached a career-high ranking of No. 13 in singles and No. 42 in doubles, both in January 2012. He won three titles in singles and one title in doubles, as well as reaching one Grand Slam quarterfinal in singles. Having been inactive since his wrist injury in 2018 including his attempted comeback which was slated in 2020, Dolgopolov announced his retirement from the ATP Tour in May 2021.
- Jared Donaldson (born 9 October 1996 in Providence, United States) joined the professional tour in 2014 and with a career-high ranking of No. 48 in singles in March 2018. He announced his retirement in December 2021 due to surgeries in the last two years and decided to start his collegiate education.
- Guillermo García López (born 4 June 1983 in La Roda, Spain) joined the professional tour in 2002 and reached a career-high ranking of No. 23 in singles in February 2011 and No. 27 in doubles in May 2017. He won five titles in singles and played for the Spanish Davis Cup team. In doubles, he won three titles, reached the final of the 2016 US Open and the semifinals of the 2017 Australian Open. In January 2021, he announced that he would retire after the 2021 season.
- Daniel Gimeno Traver (born 7 August 1985 in Valencia, Spain) joined the professional tour in 2004 and reached a career-high ranking of No. 48 in singles in March 2013 and No. 63 in doubles in February 2012. He won one title in doubles. Gimeno Traver retired from professional tennis in the season.
- Martin Kližan (born 11 July 1989 in Bratislava, Czechoslovakia (now Slovakia)) joined the professional tour in 2007 and reached a career-high ranking of No. 24 in singles in April 2015 and No. 73 in doubles in May 2015. He won six titles in singles and four titles in doubles. He also won the 2006 Junior French Open and achieved world No. 1 on the junior circuit in January 2007. He won two of his titles at ATP 500 level (Rotterdam 2016 and Hamburg 2016) and recorded four victories over top-10 players with his most notable being against Rafael Nadal at Beijing 2014 who was ranked No. 2 in the world at the time. He played his last match at 2021 Wimbledon qualifying where he lost in the first round to Zdeněk Kolář. He announced his retirement in August.
- Julian Knowle (born 29 April 1974 in Lauterach, Austria), former World No. 6 in doubles, won 19 doubles titles.
- Robert Lindstedt (born 19 March 1977 in Sundbyberg, Sweden), former World No. 3 in doubles, won 23 doubles titles. His last ATP tournament in his career was the 2021 Stockholm Open.
- Paolo Lorenzi (born 15 December 1981 in Rome, Italy) joined the professional tour in 1999 and reached a career-high ranking of No. 33 in singles in May 2017 and No. 82 in doubles in January 2018. He won one title in singles and one in doubles. He won 21 ATP Challenger Tour titles (third in the all-time leaderboard). He was part of the Italian Davis Cup team. Lorenzi announced the 2021 US Open would be his last professional tournament, and he lost to Maxime Janvier in the second qualifying round.
- (Chinese Taipei) Lu Yen-hsun (born 14 August 1983 in Taipei, Taiwan) joined the professional tour in 2001 and reached a career-high ranking of No. 33 in singles in November 2010 and No. 86 in doubles in January 2005. In singles, he won 29 challenger titles, the most anyone has won, and reached the Quarterfinals in the 2010 Wimbledon Championships. Lu announced in June that Wimbledon and the Tokyo Olympics would be his last tournaments on the tour.
- Leonardo Mayer (born 15 May 1987 in Corrientes, Argentina]) joined the professional tour in 2003 and reached a career-high ranking of No. 21 in singles in June 2015 and No. 48 in doubles in January 2019. He won two titles in singles, both times at the German Open. Mayer retired from tennis in October 2021.
- Jürgen Melzer (born 22 May 1981 in Deutsch-Wagram, Austria) joined the professional tour in 1999 and reached a career-high ranking of No. 8 in singles in April 2011 and No. 6 in doubles in November 2010. He won five titles in singles and reached the semifinals of the 2010 French Open. In doubles, he won 17 titles, including the 2010 Wimbledon Championships and the 2011 US Open. Melzer retired from singles in October 2018, but continued to play doubles competitions on the ATP Tour afterwards. In October 2020, he announced that the 2021 Australian Open would be his last professional tournament. However, he did not play the Australian Open due to the COVID-19 quarantine measures and instead played at the French Open, Wimbledon and the US Open. He played his final tournament on the ATP Tour at the Vienna Open, where he partnered Alexander Zverev.
- Viktor Troicki (born 10 February 1986 in Belgrade, SR Serbia, Yugoslavia (now Serbia)) joined the professional tour in 2006 and reached a career-high ranking of 12 in singles in June 2011 and 49 in doubles in October 2010. He won three titles in singles and 2 in doubles. In team competitions, he was part of the Serbia Davis Cup team who won the Davis Cup in 2010, as well as part of the Serbian team who won the inaugural ATP Cup in 2020. Troicki announced on 17 June 2021 that Wimbledon would be his last professional tournament.
- Luca Vanni (born 4 June 1985 in Castel del Piano, Italy) joined the professional tour in 2006 and reached a career-high ranking of No. 100 in singles in May 2015.
- James Ward (born 9 February 1987 in London, England, United Kingdom) joined the professional tour in 2006 and reached a career-high ranking of No. 89 in singles in July 2015. Ward retired from professional tennis on 17 December 2021.

=== Inactivity ===
- (Australia) Chris Guccione became inactive after not playing for more than a year.

== Comebacks ==
The following is a list of notable players (winners of a main tour title, and/or part of the ATP rankings top 100 in singles, or top 100 in doubles, for at least one week) who returned from retirement during the 2021 season:

- (Belgium) Xavier Malisse

== See also ==
- 2021 ATP Challenger Tour
- 2021 ITF Men's World Tennis Tour
- 2021 WTA Tour
