= 2021 Argentina Open =

- Date: 1 – 7 March
- Edition: 24th
- Category: ATP Tour 250 series
- Draw: 28S / 16D
- Prize money: $411,940
- Surface: Clay / outdoor
- Location: Buenos Aires, Argentina
- Venue: Buenos Aires Lawn Tennis Club

Champions

Singles
- (Argentina) Diego Schwartzman

Doubles
- (Bosnia and Herzegovina) Tomislav Brkić / (Serbia) Nikola Ćaćić
- ATP Buenos Aires

The 2021 Argentina Open was a men's tennis tournament played on outdoor clay courts. It was the 24th edition of the ATP Buenos Aires event and part of the ATP Tour 250 series of the 2021 ATP Tour. It took place in Buenos Aires, Argentina, from 1–7 March 2021.

== Finals ==
=== Singles ===
- (Argentina) Diego Schwartzman defeated (Argentina) Francisco Cerúndolo, 6–1, 6–2.

=== Doubles ===
- (Bosnia and Herzegovina) Tomislav Brkić / (Serbia) Nikola Ćaćić defeated (Uruguay) Ariel Behar / (Ecuador) Gonzalo Escobar, 6–3, 7–5.

== Points and prize money ==
=== Point distribution ===
Event	W	F	SF	QF	Round of 16	Round of 32	Q	Q3	Q2	Q1
Singles	250	150	90	45	20	0	12	6	3	0
Doubles	250	150	90	45	0	—N/a	—N/a	—N/a	—N/a	—N/a

=== Prize money ===
Event	W	F	SF	QF	Round of 16	Round of 32	Q3	Q2	Q1
Singles	$24,400	$18,030	$13,510	$9,240	$6,310	$4,505	$3,470	$2,310	$1,275
Doubles	$8,510	$6,230	$4,730	$3,390	$2,480	—N/a	—N/a	—N/a	—N/a
Doubles prize money per team

== Singles main draw entrants ==
=== Seeds ===
Country	Player	Rank^{1}	Seed
ARG	Diego Schwartzman	9	1
CHI	Cristian Garín	22	2
FRA	Benoît Paire	29	3
SRB	Miomir Kecmanović	41	4
ESP	Albert Ramos Viñolas	47	5
ESP	Pablo Andújar	55	6
SRB	Laslo Đere	59	7
USA	Frances Tiafoe	62	8

- ^{1} Rankings are as of February 22, 2021

=== Other entrants ===
The following players received wildcards into the singles main draw:

- (Argentina) Thiago Agustín Tirante
- (Argentina) Facundo Díaz Acosta
- (Denmark) Holger Rune

The following players received special exemptions into the singles main draw:

- (Argentina) Facundo Bagnis
- (Argentina) Juan Manuel Cerúndolo

The following players received entry from the qualifying draw:

- (Argentina) Francisco Cerúndolo
- (Slovakia) Lukáš Klein
- (Spain) Jaume Munar
- (India) Sumit Nagal

=== Withdrawals ===
Before the tournament

- (Uruguay) Pablo Cuevas → replaced by (Italy) Gianluca Mager
- (Spain) Pedro Martínez → replaced by (Slovakia) Andrej Martin
- (Argentina) Guido Pella → replaced by (Spain) Roberto Carballés Baena

== Doubles main draw entrants ==
=== Seeds ===
Country	Player	Country	Player	Rank^{1}	Seed
USA	Austin Krajicek	CRO	Franko Škugor	74	1
BRA	Marcelo Demoliner	MEX	Santiago González	93	2
ITA	Simone Bolelli	ARG	Máximo González	115	3
URU	Ariel Behar	ECU	Gonzalo Escobar	123	4

- ^{1} Rankings are as of February 22, 2021

=== Other entrants ===
The following pairs received wildcards into the doubles main draw:

- (Argentina) Francisco Cerúndolo / (Argentina) Federico Coria
- (Argentina) Facundo Díaz Acosta / (Argentina) Thiago Agustín Tirante

=== Withdrawals ===
Before the tournament

- (Italy) Marco Cecchinato / (Argentina) Guido Pella → replaced by (Spain) Roberto Carballes Baena / (Italy) Salvatore Caruso
- (Uruguay) Pablo Cuevas / (Austria) Oliver Marach → replaced by (Austria) Oliver Marach / (Venezuela) Luis David Martínez
- (Spain) Pablo Andújar / (Spain) Pedro Martinez → replaced by (Spain) Pablo Andújar / (Spain) Jaume Munar

During the tournament

- (Sweden) André Göransson / (Brazil) Thiago Monteiro
