= 2021 Atlanta Open =

- Date: July 24– August 1
- Edition: 33rd
- Surface: Hard, Sport Master
- Location: Atlanta, United States
- Venue: Atlantic Station

Champions

Singles
- (United States) John Isner

Doubles
- (United States) Reilly Opelka / (Italy) Jannik Sinner
← 2019 ·	Atlanta Open	· 2022 →

The 2021 Atlanta Open (also known as the Truist Atlanta Open for sponsorship reasons) is a professional tennis tournament to be played on hard courts. It is the 33rd edition of the tournament, and part of the 2021 ATP Tour. It take place at Atlantic Station in Atlanta, United States between July 24 and August 1, 2021. The tournament is hosted in the same week as the 2020 Summer Olympics.

== Finals ==
=== Singles ===
- (United States) John Isner defeated (United States) Brandon Nakashima 7–6^{(10–8)}, 7–5

It was Isner's 6th title in Atlanta and 16th title overall.

=== Doubles ===
- (United States) Reilly Opelka / (Italy) Jannik Sinner defeated (United States) Steve Johnson / (Australia) Jordan Thompson 6–4, 6–7^{(6–8)}, [10–3].

== Points and prize money ==
=== Point distribution ===
Event	W	F	SF	QF	Round of 16	Round of 32	Q	Q2	Q1
Singles	250	150	90	45	20	0	12	6	0
Doubles	250	150	90	45	0	—	—	—	—

=== Prize money ===
Event	W	F	SF	QF	Round of 16	Round of 32	Q2	Q1
Singles	€54,535	€39,100	€27,840	€18,555	€11,930	€7,175	€3,505	€1,825
Doubles	€20,360	€14,580	€9,610	€6,240	€3,660	—	—	—
Doubles prize money per team

== Singles main-draw entrants ==
=== Seeds ===
Country	Player	Rank^{1}	Seed
CAN	Milos Raonic	22	1
ITA	Jannik Sinner	23	2
GBR	Cameron Norrie	30	3
USA	Reilly Opelka	32	4
USA	Taylor Fritz	37	5
USA	John Isner	39	6
FRA	Benoît Paire	49	7
RSA	Lloyd Harris	51	8

- ^{1} Rankings are as of July 19, 2021.

=== Other entrants ===
The following players received wildcards into the main draw:

- (United States) Trent Bryde
- (Canada) Milos Raonic
- (United States) Jack Sock

The following player received entry using a protected ranking:

- (United States) J. J. Wolf

The following player received entry as special exempt:

- (United States) Brandon Nakashima

The following players received entry from the qualifying draw:

- (Russia) Evgeny Donskoy
- (United States) Bjorn Fratangelo
- (Germany) Peter Gojowczyk
- (Australia) Christopher O'Connell

=== Withdrawals ===
Before the tournament

- (Bulgaria) Grigor Dimitrov → replaced by (Japan) Yasutaka Uchiyama
- (Belarus) Egor Gerasimov → replaced by (United States) Mackenzie McDonald
- (United States) Sebastian Korda → replaced by (United States) Denis Kudla
- (France) Adrian Mannarino → replaced by (Lithuania) Ričardas Berankis
- (United States) Tommy Paul → replaced by (Italy) Andreas Seppi
- (Argentina) Guido Pella → replaced by (South Africa) Kevin Anderson

== Doubles main-draw entrants ==
=== Seeds ===
Country	Player	Country	Player	Rank^{1}	Seed
GBR	Luke Bambridge	GBR	Ken Skupski	124	1
ISR	Jonathan Erlich	MEX	Santiago González	124	2
PAK	Aisam-ul-Haq Qureshi	IND	Divij Sharan	138	3
AUS	Matthew Ebden	AUS	John-Patrick Smith	147	4

- ^{1} Rankings are as of July 19, 2021.

=== Other entrants ===
The following pairs received wildcards into the doubles main draw:

- (United States) Keshav Chopra / (United States) Andres Martin
- (Australia) Nick Kyrgios / (United States) Jack Sock
