= 2021 Barcelona Open Banc Sabadell =

- Date: 19–25 April
- Edition: 68th
- Category: ATP Tour 500
- Draw: 48S / 16D
- Prize money: €1,702,800
- Surface: Clay
- Location: Barcelona, Spain
- Venue: Real Club de Tenis Barcelona

Champions

Singles
- (Spain) Rafael Nadal

Doubles
- (Colombia) Juan Sebastián Cabal / (Colombia) Robert Farah
← 2019 ·	Barcelona Open	· 2022 →

The 2021 Barcelona Open Banc Sabadell (also known as the Torneo Godó) was a men's tennis tournament played on outdoor clay courts. It was the 68th edition of the event and part of the ATP Tour 500 series of the 2021 ATP Tour. It took place at the Real Club de Tenis Barcelona in Barcelona, Spain, from 19 to 25 April 2021.

The 2020 tournament was originally scheduled to be played on 20 to 26 April 2020. Due to the COVID-19 pandemic, local restrictions, and the suspension of all play on the ATP Tour, the 2020 edition was cancelled in March 2020.

== Champions ==
=== Singles ===
- (Spain) Rafael Nadal def. (Greece) Stefanos Tsitsipas, 6–4, 6–7^{(6–8)}, 7–5

=== Doubles ===
- (Colombia) Juan Sebastián Cabal / (Colombia) Robert Farah def. (Germany) Kevin Krawietz / (Romania) Horia Tecău, 6–4, 6–2

== Points and prize money ==
=== Points distribution ===
Event	W	F	SF	QF	Round of 16	Round of 32	Round of 64	Q	Q2	Q1
Singles	500	300	180	90	45	20	0	10	4	0
Doubles	500	300	180	90	0	—	—	45	25	0

=== Prize money ===
Event	W	F	SF	QF	Round of 16	Round of 32	Round of 64	Q2	Q1
Singles	€178,985	€111,600	€69,840	€42,180	€24,900	€14,700	€8,700	€3,960	€2,100
Doubles*	€58,500	€39,300	€26,100	€17,100	€10,800	—	—	—	—

_{*per team}

== Singles main-draw entrants ==
=== Seeds ===
Country	Player	Rank^{1}	Seed
ESP	Rafael Nadal	3	1
GRE	Stefanos Tsitsipas	5	2
RUS	Andrey Rublev	8	3
ARG	Diego Schwartzman	9	4
ESP	Roberto Bautista Agut	11	5
BEL	David Goffin	12	6
ESP	Pablo Carreño Busta	13	7
CAN	Denis Shapovalov	14	8
ITA	Fabio Fognini	18	9
CAN	Félix Auger-Aliassime	21	10
ITA	Jannik Sinner	22	11
RUS	Karen Khachanov	23	12
CHI	Cristian Garín	24	13
AUS	Alex de Minaur	25	14
~~NOR~~	~~Casper Ruud~~	~~27~~	~~15~~
GBR	Dan Evans	33	16
FRA	Adrian Mannarino	34	17

- ^{1} Rankings as of April 12, 2021.

=== Other entrants ===
The following players received wildcards into the main draw:

- (Spain) Carlos Alcaraz
- (Spain) Jaume Munar
- (Italy) Lorenzo Musetti
- (Russia) Andrey Rublev

The following players received entry from the qualifying draw:

- (Netherlands) Tallon Griekspoor
- (Belarus) Ilya Ivashka
- (Russia) Andrey Kuznetsov
- (India) Sumit Nagal
- (Denmark) Holger Rune
- (Spain) Bernabé Zapata Miralles

The following player received entry as a lucky loser:

- (Italy) Federico Gaio

=== Withdrawals ===
Before the tournament

- (Bulgaria) Grigor Dimitrov → replaced by (Italy) Salvatore Caruso
- (South Africa) Lloyd Harris → replaced by (Brazil) Thiago Monteiro
- (Australia) Nick Kyrgios → replaced by (France) Jo-Wilfried Tsonga
- (United States) Reilly Opelka → replaced by (France) Pierre-Hugues Herbert
- (Norway) Casper Ruud → replaced by (Italy) Federico Gaio
- (Germany) Jan-Lennard Struff → replaced by (France) Gilles Simon

=== Defaults ===
- (Italy) Fabio Fognini

=== Retirements ===
- (Belgium) David Goffin

== Doubles main-draw entrants ==
=== Seeds ===
Country	Player	Country	Player	Rank^{1}	Seed
COL	Juan Sebastián Cabal	COL	Robert Farah	5	1
ESP	Marcel Granollers	ARG	Horacio Zeballos	20	2
USA	Rajeev Ram	GBR	Joe Salisbury	23	3
NED	Wesley Koolhof	POL	Łukasz Kubot	26	4

- Rankings are as of April 12, 2021.

=== Other entrants ===
The following pairs received wildcards into the doubles main draw:

- (Spain) Carlos Alcaraz / (Spain) Pablo Carreño Busta
- (Spain) Feliciano López / (Spain) Marc López

The following pair received entry from the qualifying draw:

- (France) Adrian Mannarino / (France) Benoît Paire

=== Withdrawals ===
Before the tournament

- (United Kingdom) Jamie Murray / (Brazil) Bruno Soares → (Chile) Cristian Garín / (Argentina) Guido Pella
- (Croatia) Ivan Dodig / (Croatia) Franko Škugor → (Croatia) Ivan Dodig / (United Kingdom) Jamie Murray

During the tournament

- (Spain) Carlos Alcaraz / (Spain) Pablo Carreño Busta
