= 2021 Barcelona Open Banc Sabadell – Doubles =

Doubles
- 2021 Barcelona Open Banc Sabadell

Final
- Champions: (Colombia) Juan Sebastián Cabal (Colombia) Robert Farah
- Runners-up: (Germany) Kevin Krawietz (Romania) Horia Tecău
- Score: 6–4, 6–2

Events
Singles	Doubles
- Barcelona Open Banc Sabadell

Defending champions Juan Sebastián Cabal and Robert Farah successfully defended their title, defeating Kevin Krawietz and Horia Tecău in the final, 6–4, 6–2, to win the doubles tennis title at the 2021 Barcelona Open. The top seeds did not drop a set en route to their 18th career ATP Tour doubles title together. Krawietz and Tecău were in contention to win their first title as a team.

== Seeds ==
1. (Colombia) Juan Sebastián Cabal / (Colombia) Robert Farah (champions)
2. (Spain) Marcel Granollers / (Argentina) Horacio Zeballos (first round)
3. (United States) Rajeev Ram / (United Kingdom) Joe Salisbury (semifinals)
4. (Netherlands) Wesley Koolhof / (Poland) Łukasz Kubot (first round)

== Draw ==
Key

- Q = Qualifier
- WC = Wild card
- LL = Lucky loser
- Alt = Alternate
- ITF = ITF entry
- PR = Protected ranking
- SR = Special ranking
- SE = Special exempt
- JE = Junior exempt
- JR = Junior Accelerator Programme entrant
- CO = College Accelerator Programme entrant
- NG = Next Gen Accelerator Program entrant
- w/o = Walkover
- r = Retired
- d = Defaulted

=== Draw ===
First round
1	(Colombia) JS Cabal (Colombia) R Farah	6	6
(France) P-H Herbert (France) N Mahut	2	4
(United Kingdom) D Evans (United Kingdom) N Skupski	6	5	[13]
(Finland) H Kontinen (France) É Roger-Vasselin	4	7	[11]
4	(Netherlands) W Koolhof (Poland) Ł Kubot	4	1
WC	(Spain) C Alcaraz (Spain) P Carreño Busta	6	6
(France) J Chardy (France) F Martin	7^{7}	6^{4}	[10]
Q	(France) A Mannarino (France) B Paire	6^{1}	7^{7}	[8]
WC	(Spain) F López (Spain) M López	3	1
(Croatia) I Dodig (United Kingdom) J Murray	6	6
(Chile) C Garín (Argentina) G Pella	0	3
3	(United States) R Ram (United Kingdom) J Salisbury	6	6
(Australia) J Peers (Australia) L Saville	6	6
(Brazil) M Melo (Netherlands) J-J Rojer	1	4
(Germany) K Krawietz (Romania) H Tecău	7^{7}	7^{7}
2	(Spain) M Granollers (Argentina) H Zeballos	6^{4}	6^{3}

Quarterfinals
1	(Colombia) JS Cabal (Colombia) R Farah	6	6
(United Kingdom) D Evans (United Kingdom) N Skupski	3	4
WC	(Spain) C Alcaraz (Spain) P Carreño Busta
(France) J Chardy (France) F Martin	w/o
(Croatia) I Dodig (United Kingdom) J Murray	3	4
3	(United States) R Ram (United Kingdom) J Salisbury	6	6
(Australia) J Peers (Australia) L Saville	4	3
(Germany) K Krawietz (Romania) H Tecău	6	6

Semifinals
1	(Colombia) JS Cabal (Colombia) R Farah	7	6
(France) J Chardy (France) F Martin	5	1
3	(United States) R Ram (United Kingdom) J Salisbury	6	3	[9]
(Germany) K Krawietz (Romania) H Tecău	1	6	[11]

Final
1	(Colombia) JS Cabal (Colombia) R Farah	6	6
(Germany) K Krawietz (Romania) H Tecău	4	2

== Qualifying ==
=== Seeds ===
1. (Belgium) Sander Gillé / (Belgium) Joran Vliegen (first round)
2. (New Zealand) Marcus Daniell / (Austria) Philipp Oswald (qualifying competition)

=== Qualifiers ===
1. (France) Adrian Mannarino / (France) Benoît Paire

=== Qualifying draw ===
First round
1	(Belgium) Sander Gillé (Belgium) Joran Vliegen	4	4
(France) Adrian Mannarino (France) Benoît Paire	6	6
WC	(Spain) David Marrero (Spain) Tommy Robredo	3	3
2	(New Zealand) Marcus Daniell (Austria) Philipp Oswald	6	6

Qualifying competition
(France) Adrian Mannarino (France) Benoît Paire	1	7^{7}	[10]
2	(New Zealand) Marcus Daniell (Austria) Philipp Oswald	6	6^{0}	[7]
