= 2021 Atlanta Open – Singles =

Atlanta Open (tennis)

Singles
- 2021 Atlanta Open

Final
- Champion: (United States) John Isner
- Runner-up: (United States) Brandon Nakashima
- Score: 7–6^{(10–8)}, 7–5

Details
- Draw: 28 (4 Q / 3 WC )
- Seeds: 8

Events
Singles	Doubles
← 2019 ·	Atlanta Open	· 2022 →

Alex de Minaur was the reigning champion from when the tournament was last held in 2019, but chose not to participate this year.

John Isner won his sixth Atlanta Open title, defeating Brandon Nakashima in the final, 7–6^{(10–8)}, 7–5.

== Seeds ==
The top four seeds receive a bye into the second round.

1. (Canada) Milos Raonic (second round)
2. (Italy) Jannik Sinner (second round)
3. (United Kingdom) Cameron Norrie (quarterfinals)
4. (United States) Reilly Opelka (quarterfinals)
5. (United States) Taylor Fritz (semifinals)
6. (United States) John Isner (champion)
7. (France) Benoît Paire (second round, retired)
8. (South Africa) Lloyd Harris (first round)

== Draw ==
=== Key ===
- Q = Qualifier
- WC = Wild card
- LL = Lucky loser
- Alt = Alternate
- SE = Special exempt
- PR = Protected ranking
- ITF = ITF entry
- JE = Junior exempt
- w/o = Walkover
- r = Retired
- d = Defaulted
- SR = Special ranking

=== Finals ===
Semifinals
SE	(United States) Brandon Nakashima	3	6	6
(Finland) Emil Ruusuvuori	6	4	3
5	(United States) Taylor Fritz	6^{4}	7	3
6	(United States) John Isner	7^{7}	5	6

Final
SE	(United States) Brandon Nakashima	6^{8}	5
6	(United States) John Isner	7^{10}	7

=== Top half ===
First round
WC	(United States) T Bryde	1	7^{7}	4
SE	(United States) B Nakashima	6	6^{5}	6
Q	(Germany) P Gojowczyk	4	7^{7}	7^{7}
(United States) S Querrey	6	6^{3}	6^{5}
(Australia) J Thompson	7^{7}	1	6
8	(South Africa) L Harris	6^{2}	6	2
(South Africa) K Anderson	6^{4}	3
(Australia) N Kyrgios	7^{7}	6
(United States) M McDonald	6^{3}	5
(Finland) E Ruusuvuori	7^{7}	7
(Japan) Y Uchiyama	5	7^{7}	4
7	(France) B Paire	7	6^{2}	6

Second round
1/WC	(Canada) M Raonic	7	3	6^{4}
SE	(United States) B Nakashima	5	6	7^{7}
Q	(Germany) P Gojowczyk	6^{6}	4
(Australia) J Thompson	7^{8}	6
3	(United Kingdom) C Norrie	6	6
(Australia) N Kyrgios	1	4
(Finland) E Ruusuvuori	4	6	3
7	(France) B Paire	6	4	0^{r}

Quarterfinals
SE	(United States) B Nakashima	7^{7}	7
(Australia) J Thompson	6^{5}	5
3	(United Kingdom) C Norrie	6^{1}	3
(Finland) E Ruusuvuori	7^{7}	6

Semifinals
SE	(United States) B Nakashima	3	6	6
(Finland) E Ruusuvuori	6	4	3

=== Bottom half ===
First round
5	(United States) T Fritz	6	6
Q	(Russia) E Donskoy	3	4
(Australia) A Popyrin	6^{4}	3
(United States) S Johnson	7^{7}	6
(Italy) A Seppi	5	6^{5}
Q	(United States) B Fratangelo	7	7^{7}
6	(United States) J Isner	6	6^{3}	6
PR	(United States) J. J. Wolf	4	7^{7}	4
WC	(United States) J Sock	6^{4}	6	7
(Lithuania) R Berankis	7^{7}	4	5
Q	(Australia) C O'Connell	4	6	6
(United States) D Kudla	6	3	3

Second round
5	(United States) T Fritz	6^{5}	6	6
(United States) S Johnson	7^{7}	4	1
Q	(United States) B Fratangelo	6^{3}	6^{4}
4	(United States) R Opelka	7^{7}	7^{7}
6	(United States) J Isner	7^{8}	6
WC	(United States) J Sock	6^{6}	4
Q	(Australia) C O'Connell	7^{9}	6
2	(Italy) J Sinner	6^{7}	4

Quarterfinals
5	(United States) T Fritz	7^{7}	6^{3}	7^{7}
4	(United States) R Opelka	6^{5}	7^{7}	6^{4}
6	(United States) J Isner	7^{7}	6^{3}	6
Q	(Australia) C O'Connell	6^{5}	7^{7}	4

Semifinals
5	(United States) T Fritz	6^{4}	7	3
6	(United States) J Isner	7^{7}	5	6

== Qualifying ==
=== Seeds ===
1. (Germany) Peter Gojowczyk (qualified)
2. (Australia) Christopher O'Connell (qualified)
3. (Russia) Evgeny Donskoy (qualified)
4. (Chinese Taipei) Jason Jung (qualifying competition)
5. (Ukraine) Illya Marchenko (first round)
6. (Austria) Sebastian Ofner (qualifying competition, retired)
7. (Sweden) Elias Ymer (first round)
8. (Japan) Go Soeda (first round)

=== Qualifiers ===
1. (Germany) Peter Gojowczyk
2. (Australia) Christopher O'Connell
3. (Russia) Evgeny Donskoy
4. (United States) Bjorn Fratangelo

=== Qualifying draw ===
==== First qualifier ====
First round
1	(Germany) Peter Gojowczyk	6	6
WC	(United States) Donald Young	4	1
Alt	(United Kingdom) James Ward	6	7^{7}
5	(Ukraine) Illya Marchenko	3	6^{1}

Qualifying competition
1	(Germany) Peter Gojowczyk	6	6
Alt	(United Kingdom) James Ward	2	4

==== Second qualifier ====
First round
2	(Australia) Christopher O'Connell	7	6
(Japan) Yosuke Watanuki	5	4
WC	(United States) Samir Banerjee	5	4
6	(Austria) Sebastian Ofner	7	6

Qualifying competition
2	(Australia) Christopher O'Connell	4
6	(Austria) Sebastian Ofner	2^{r}

==== Third qualifier ====
First round
3	(Russia) Evgeny Donskoy	3	6	6
(United States) Noah Rubin	6	3	4
(Australia) Matthew Ebden	6	7^{7}
8	(Japan) Go Soeda	3	6^{4}

Qualifying competition
3	(Russia) Evgeny Donskoy	6	6
(Australia) Matthew Ebden	4	4

==== Fourth qualifier ====
First round
4	(Chinese Taipei) Jason Jung	6	6^{4}	6
(Slovakia) Lukáš Lacko	4	7^{7}	3
(United States) Bjorn Fratangelo	7^{7}	6
7	(Sweden) Elias Ymer	6^{5}	3

Qualifying competition
4	(Chinese Taipei) Jason Jung	3	6	5
(United States) Bjorn Fratangelo	6	1	7
