= 2021 Argentina Open – Doubles =

Doubles
- 2021 Argentina Open

Final
- Champions: (Bosnia and Herzegovina) Tomislav Brkić (Serbia) Nikola Ćaćić
- Runners-up: (Uruguay) Ariel Behar (Ecuador) Gonzalo Escobar
- Score: 6–3, 7–5

Events
Singles	Doubles
- Argentina Open

Marcel Granollers and Horacio Zeballos were the defending champions, but they decided not to participate this year.

Tomislav Brkić and Nikola Ćaćić won the title, defeating Ariel Behar and Gonzalo Escobar in the final, 6–3, 7–5.

== Seeds ==
1. (United States) Austin Krajicek / (Croatia) Franko Škugor (semifinals)
2. (Brazil) Marcelo Demoliner / (Mexico) Santiago González (first round)
3. (Italy) Simone Bolelli / (Argentina) Máximo González (quarterfinals)
4. (Uruguay) Ariel Behar / (Ecuador) Gonzalo Escobar (final)

== Draw ==
Key

- Q = Qualifier
- WC = Wild card
- LL = Lucky loser
- Alt = Alternate
- ITF = ITF entry
- PR = Protected ranking
- SR = Special ranking
- SE = Special exempt
- JE = Junior exempt
- JR = Junior Accelerator Programme entrant
- CO = College Accelerator Programme entrant
- NG = Next Gen Accelerator Program entrant
- w/o = Walkover
- r = Retired
- d = Defaulted

=== Draw ===
First round
1	(United States) A Krajicek (Croatia) F Škugor	2	6	[10]
(Spain) P Andújar (Spain) J Munar	6	3	[8]
(United States) N Monroe (New Zealand) A Sitak	6	6^{3}	[7]
WC	(Argentina) F Cerúndolo (Argentina) F Coria	3	7^{7}	[10]
4	(Uruguay) A Behar (Ecuador) G Escobar	6	6^{9}	[10]
(Serbia) M Kecmanović (Italy) G Mager	3	7^{11}	[6]
(Austria) O Marach (Venezuela) LD Martínez	6	3	[11]
(Monaco) R Arneodo (France) B Paire	4	6	[9]
(Argentina) G Durán (Argentina) A Molteni	2	1
(Germany) D Koepfer (Portugal) J Sousa	6	6
WC	(Argentina) F Díaz Acosta (Argentina) TA Tirante	6^{5}	1
3	(Italy) S Bolelli (Argentina) M González	7^{7}	6
(Bosnia and Herzegovina) T Brkić (Serbia) N Ćaćić	6	6
Alt	(Spain) R Carballés Baena (Italy) S Caruso	3	4
(Sweden) A Göransson (Brazil) T Monteiro	6	6
2	(Brazil) M Demoliner (Mexico) S González	4	2

Quarterfinals
1	(United States) A Krajicek (Croatia) F Škugor	6	6
WC	(Argentina) F Cerúndolo (Argentina) F Coria	4	2
4	(Uruguay) A Behar (Ecuador) G Escobar	6	7^{7}
(Austria) O Marach (Venezuela) LD Martínez	2	6^{3}
(Germany) D Koepfer (Portugal) J Sousa	4	7^{7}	[10]
3	(Italy) S Bolelli (Argentina) M González	6	6^{4}	[5]
(Bosnia and Herzegovina) T Brkić (Serbia) N Ćaćić	w/o
(Sweden) A Göransson (Brazil) T Monteiro

Semifinals
1	(United States) A Krajicek (Croatia) F Škugor	6^{6}	6	[3]
4	(Uruguay) A Behar (Ecuador) G Escobar	7^{8}	4	[10]
(Germany) D Koepfer (Portugal) J Sousa	6	6^{5}	[5]
(Bosnia and Herzegovina) T Brkić (Serbia) N Ćaćić	3	7^{7}	[10]

Final
4	(Uruguay) A Behar (Ecuador) G Escobar	3	5
(Bosnia and Herzegovina) T Brkić (Serbia) N Ćaćić	6	7
