= 2021 Atlanta Open – Doubles =

Doubles
- 2021 Atlanta Open

Final
- Champions: (United States) Reilly Opelka (Italy) Jannik Sinner
- Runners-up: (United States) Steve Johnson (Australia) Jordan Thompson
- Score: 6–4, 6–7^{(6–8)}, [10–3]

Events
Singles	Doubles
← 2019 ·	Atlanta Open	· 2022 →

Dominic Inglot and Austin Krajicek were the reigning champions from the tournament's previous edition in 2019, but chose not to participate in 2021.

Reilly Opelka and Jannik Sinner won the title, defeating Steve Johnson and Jordan Thompson in the final, 6–4, 6–7^{(6–8)}, [10–3].

== Seeds ==
1. (United Kingdom) Luke Bambridge / (United Kingdom) Ken Skupski (quarterfinals)
2. (Israel) Jonathan Erlich / (Mexico) Santiago González (first round)
3. (Pakistan) Aisam-ul-Haq Qureshi / (India) Divij Sharan (first round)
4. (Australia) Matthew Ebden / (Australia) John-Patrick Smith (quarterfinals)

== Draw ==
=== Key ===
- Q = Qualifier
- WC = Wild card
- LL = Lucky loser
- Alt = Alternate
- ITF = ITF entry
- PR = Protected ranking
- SR = Special ranking
- SE = Special exempt
- JE = Junior exempt
- JR = Junior Accelerator Programme entrant
- CO = College Accelerator Programme entrant
- NG = Next Gen Accelerator Program entrant
- w/o = Walkover
- r = Retired
- d = Defaulted

=== Draw ===
First round
1	(United Kingdom) L Bambridge (United Kingdom) K Skupski	6	6^{6}	[10]
(United Kingdom) L Glasspool (United States) N Monroe	3	7^{8}	[6]
(Sweden) A Göransson (Denmark) F Nielsen	6^{4}	6	[9]
(Australia) A Popyrin (Australia) M Reid	7^{7}	2	[11]
3	(Pakistan) A-u-H Qureshi (India) D Sharan	1	3
WC	(Australia) N Kyrgios (United States) J Sock	6	6
(United States) S Johnson (Australia) J Thompson	6	7
(United States) N Lammons (United States) J Withrow	4	5
(El Salvador) M Arévalo (Mexico) MÁ Reyes-Varela	6	6
WC	(United States) K Chopra (United States) A Martin	1	4
(United States) T Fritz (United Kingdom) C Norrie	2	6^{1}
4	(Australia) M Ebden (Australia) J-P Smith	6	7^{7}
(Philippines) T Huey (France) B Paire	7^{7}	7^{7}
(Finland) H Heliövaara (Finland) E Ruusuvuori	6^{2}	6^{2}
(United States) R Opelka (Italy) J Sinner	6	6
2	(Israel) J Erlich (Mexico) S González	2	2

Quarterfinals
1	(United Kingdom) L Bambridge (United Kingdom) K Skupski	6	4	[6]
(Australia) A Popyrin (Australia) M Reid	3	6	[10]
WC	(Australia) N Kyrgios (United States) J Sock	3	4
(United States) S Johnson (Australia) J Thompson	6	6
(El Salvador) M Arévalo (Mexico) MÁ Reyes-Varela	6	3	[11]
4	(Australia) M Ebden (Australia) J-P Smith	3	6	[9]
(Philippines) T Huey (France) B Paire	6^{4}	4
(United States) R Opelka (Italy) J Sinner	7^{7}	6

Semifinals
(Australia) A Popyrin (Australia) M Reid	6	3	[8]
(United States) S Johnson (Australia) J Thompson	4	6	[10]
(El Salvador) M Arévalo (Mexico) MÁ Reyes-Varela	3	4
(United States) R Opelka (Italy) J Sinner	6	6

Final
(United States) S Johnson (Australia) J Thompson	4	7^{8}	[3]
(United States) R Opelka (Italy) J Sinner	6	6^{6}	[10]
