= 2021 ATP Finals =

- Date: 14–21 November
- Edition: 52nd (singles) / 47th (doubles)
- Category: ATP Finals
- Draw: 8S/8D
- Prize money: $7,250,000
- Surface: Hard (indoor)
- Location: Turin, Italy
- Venue: Pala Alpitour

Champions

Singles
- (Germany) Alexander Zverev

Doubles
- (France) Pierre-Hugues Herbert / (France) Nicolas Mahut
- ATP Finals

The 2021 ATP Finals (also known as the 2021 Nitto ATP Finals for Nitto sponsorship) was a men's tennis year-end tournament played on indoor hard courts at the Pala Alpitour in Turin, Italy, from 14 to 21 November 2021. It was the season-ending event for the highest-ranked singles players and doubles teams on the 2021 ATP Tour.

This was the 52nd edition of the tournament (47th in doubles), and the first time Turin hosted the ATP Tour year-end championships.

== Champions ==
=== Singles ===
(Germany) Alexander Zverev def. (Russia) Daniil Medvedev, 6–4, 6–4

=== Doubles ===
(France) Pierre-Hugues Herbert / (France) Nicolas Mahut def. (United States) Rajeev Ram / (United Kingdom) Joe Salisbury, 6–4, 7–6^{(7–0)}

=== Day-by-day summaries ===
Session	Event	Group / round	Winner	Loser	Score
Day 1 (14 November)
Afternoon	Doubles	Green Group	(Croatia) Nikola Mektić / (Croatia) Mate Pavić [1]	(Germany) Kevin Krawietz / (Romania) Horia Tecău [8]	6–4, 6–4
Afternoon	Singles	Red Group	(Russia) Daniil Medvedev [2]	(Poland) Hubert Hurkacz [7]	6–7^{(5–7)}, 6–3, 6–4
Evening	Doubles	Green Group	(Spain) Marcel Granollers / (Argentina) Horacio Zeballos [4]	(Croatia) Ivan Dodig / (Slovakia) Filip Polášek [6]	4–6, 7–6^{(12–10)}, [10–6]
Evening	Singles	Red Group	(Germany) Alexander Zverev [3]	(Italy) Matteo Berrettini [6]	7–6^{(9–7)}, 1–0, ret.
Day 2 (15 November)
Afternoon	Doubles	Red Group	(United States) Rajeev Ram / (United Kingdom) Joe Salisbury [2]	(United Kingdom) Jamie Murray / (Brazil) Bruno Soares [7]	6–1, 7–6^{(7–5)}
Afternoon	Singles	Green Group	(Serbia) Novak Djokovic [1]	(Norway) Casper Ruud [8]	7–6^{(7–4)}, 6–2
Evening	Doubles	Red Group	(France) Pierre-Hugues Herbert / (France) Nicolas Mahut [3]	(Colombia) Juan Sebastián Cabal / (Colombia) Robert Farah [5]	7–6^{(7–1)}, 6–4
Evening	Singles	Green Group	(Russia) Andrey Rublev [5]	Stefanos Tsitsipas [4]	6–4, 6–4
Day 3 (16 November)
Afternoon	Doubles	Green Group	(Spain) Marcel Granollers / (Argentina) Horacio Zeballos [4]	(Croatia) Nikola Mektić / (Croatia) Mate Pavić [1]	6–4, 7–6^{(7–4)}
Afternoon	Singles	Red Group	(Russia) Daniil Medvedev [2]	(Germany) Alexander Zverev [3]	6–3, 6–7^{(3–7)}, 7–6^{(8–6)}
Evening	Doubles	Green Group	(Croatia) Ivan Dodig / (Slovakia) Filip Polášek [6]	(Germany) Kevin Krawietz / (Romania) Horia Tecău [8]	7–6^{(7–2)}, 7–5
Evening	Singles	Red Group	(Italy) Jannik Sinner [Alt.]	(Poland) Hubert Hurkacz [7]	6–2, 6–2
Day 4 (17 November)
Afternoon	Doubles	Red Group	(Colombia) Juan Sebastián Cabal / (Colombia) Robert Farah [5]	(United Kingdom) Jamie Murray / (Brazil) Bruno Soares [7]	6–2, 6–4
Afternoon	Singles	Green Group	(Serbia) Novak Djokovic [1]	(Russia) Andrey Rublev [5]	6–3, 6–2
Evening	Doubles	Red Group	(United States) Rajeev Ram / (United Kingdom) Joe Salisbury [2]	(France) Pierre-Hugues Herbert / (France) Nicolas Mahut [3]	6–7^{(7–9)}, 6–0, [13–11]
Evening	Singles	Green Group	(Norway) Casper Ruud [8]	(United Kingdom) Cameron Norrie [Alt.]	1–6, 6–3, 6–4
Day 5 (18 November)
Afternoon	Doubles	Green Group	(Germany) Kevin Krawietz / (Romania) Horia Tecău [8]	(Spain) Marcel Granollers / (Argentina) Horacio Zeballos [4]	6–3, 6–7^{(1–7)}, [10–5]
Afternoon	Singles	Red Group	(Germany) Alexander Zverev [3]	(Poland) Hubert Hurkacz [7]	6–2, 6–4
Evening	Doubles	Green Group	(Croatia) Nikola Mektić / (Croatia) Mate Pavić [1]	(Croatia) Ivan Dodig / (Slovakia) Filip Polášek [6]	6–4, 7–6^{(8–6)}
Evening	Singles	Red Group	(Russia) Daniil Medvedev [2]	(Italy) Jannik Sinner [Alt.]	6–0, 6–7^{(5–7)}, 7–6^{(10–8)}
Day 6 (19 November)
Afternoon	Doubles	Red Group	(United States) Rajeev Ram / (United Kingdom) Joe Salisbury [2]	(Colombia) Juan Sebastián Cabal / (Colombia) Robert Farah [5]	7–5, 2–6, [11–9]
Afternoon	Singles	Green Group	(Norway) Casper Ruud [8]	(Russia) Andrey Rublev [5]	2–6, 7–5, 7–6^{(7–5)}
Evening	Doubles	Red Group	(France) Pierre-Hugues Herbert / (France) Nicolas Mahut [3]	(United Kingdom) Jamie Murray / (Brazil) Bruno Soares [7]	6–3, 7–6^{(7–5)}
Evening	Singles	Green Group	(Serbia) Novak Djokovic [1]	(United Kingdom) Cameron Norrie [Alt.]	6–2, 6–1
Day 7 (20 November)
Afternoon	Doubles	Semifinals	(United States) Rajeev Ram / (United Kingdom) Joe Salisbury [2]	(Croatia) Nikola Mektić / (Croatia) Mate Pavić [1]	4–6, 7–6^{(7–3)}, [10–4]
Afternoon	Singles	Semifinals	(Russia) Daniil Medvedev [2]	(Norway) Casper Ruud [8]	6–4, 6–2
Evening	Doubles	Semifinals	(France) Pierre-Hugues Herbert / (France) Nicolas Mahut [3]	(Spain) Marcel Granollers / (Argentina) Horacio Zeballos [4]	6–3, 6–4
Evening	Singles	Semifinals	(Germany) Alexander Zverev [3]	(Serbia) Novak Djokovic [1]	7–6^{(7–4)}, 4–6, 6–3
Day 8 (21 November)
Afternoon	Doubles	Final	(France) Pierre-Hugues Herbert / (France) Nicolas Mahut [3]	(United States) Rajeev Ram / (United Kingdom) Joe Salisbury [2]	6–4, 7–6^{(7–0)}
Afternoon	Singles	Final	(Germany) Alexander Zverev [3]	(Russia) Daniil Medvedev [2]	6–4, 6–4

== Points and prize money ==
The ATP Finals currently (2021) rewards the following points and prize money, per victory:

Stage	Singles	Doubles^{1}	Points
Final win	$1,094,000	$164,000	RR + 400 + 500
Semi-final win	$530,000	$84,000	RR + 400
Round robin win per match	$173,000	$33,000	200
Participation fee	3 matches = $173,000; 2 matches = $129,750; 1 match = $86,500	3 matches = $82,000; 2 matches = $61,000; 1 match = $32,000	—N/a
Alternates	$93,000	$33,000	—N/a
RR is the points or prize money won in the round robin stage.

- ^{1} Prize money for doubles is per team.
- An undefeated champion would earn the maximum 1,500 points, and $2,316,000 in singles or $429,000 in doubles.

== Tournament ==
=== Format ===
The ATP Finals group stage had a round-robin format, with eight players/teams divided into two groups of four and each player/team in a group playing the other three in the group. The eight seeds were determined by the ATP rankings and ATP Doubles Team Rankings on the Monday after the last ATP Tour tournament of the calendar year. All singles matches, including the final, were best of three sets with tie-breaks in each set including the third. All doubles matches were two sets (no ad) and a Match Tie-break.

In deciding placement within a group, the following criteria were used, in order:

1. Most wins.
2. Most matches played (e.g., a 2–1 record beats a 2–0 record).
3. Head-to-head result between tied players/teams.
4. Highest percentage of sets won.
5. Highest percentage of games won.
6. ATP rank after the last ATP Tour tournament of the year.

Criteria 4–6 were used only in the event of a three-way tie; if one of these criteria decided a winner or loser among the three, the remaining two would have been ranked by head-to-head result.

The top two of each group advanced to semifinals, with the winner of each group playing the runner-up of the other group. The winners of the semifinals then played for the title.

=== Qualification ===
==== Singles ====
Eight players compete at the tournament, with two named alternates. Players receive places in the following order of precedence:

1. First, the top 7 players in the ATP Race to Turin on the Monday after the final tournament of the ATP Tour, that is, after the Stockholm Open.
2. Second, up to two 2021 Grand Slam tournament winners ranked anywhere 8th–20th, in ranking order
3. Third, the eighth ranked player in the ATP rankings

In the event of this totaling more than 8 players, those lower down in the selection order become the alternates. If further alternates are needed, these players are selected by the ATP.

Provisional rankings are published weekly as the ATP Race to Turin, which only counts events played in 2021. Points are accumulated in Grand Slam, ATP Tour, ATP Cup, ATP Challenger Tour and ITF Tour tournaments. Players accrue points across 19 tournaments, usually made up of:

- The 4 Grand Slam tournaments
- The 8 mandatory ATP Masters 1000 tournaments
- The best results from any 7 other tournaments that carry ranking points (ATP Cup, ATP 500, ATP 250, Challenger, ITF)

All players must include the ranking points for mandatory Masters tournaments for which they are on the original acceptance list and for all Grand Slams for which they would be eligible, even if they do not compete (in which case they receive zero points). Furthermore, players who finished 2020 in the world's top 30 are commitment players who must (if not injured) include points for the 8 mandatory Masters tournament regardless of whether they enter, and who must compete in at least 4 ATP 500 tournaments (though the Monte Carlo Masters may count to this total), of which one must take place after the US Open. Zero point scores may also be taken from withdrawals by non-injured players from ATP 500 tournaments according to certain other conditions outlined by the ATP. Beyond these rules, however, a player may substitute his next best tournament result for missed Masters and Grand Slam tournaments.

Players may have their ATP Tour Masters 1000 commitment reduced by one tournament, by reaching each of the following milestones:

1. 600 tour level matches (as of January 1, 2021),
2. 12 years of service,
3. 31 years of age (as of January 1, 2021).

If a player satisfies all three of these conditions, their mandatory ATP Tour Masters 1000 commitment is dropped entirely. Players must be in good standing as defined by the ATP as to avail of the reduced commitment.

==== Doubles ====
Eight teams compete at the tournament, with one named alternates. The eight competing teams receive places according to the same order of precedence as in singles. The named alternate will be offered first to any unaccepted teams in the selection order, then to the highest ranked unaccepted team, and then to a team selected by the ATP. Points are accumulated in the same competitions as for the singles tournament. However, for Doubles teams there are no commitment tournaments, so teams are ranked according to their 19 highest points scoring results from any tournaments on the ATP Tour.

== Qualified players ==
=== Singles ===
#	Players	Points	Date qualified
1	(Serbia) Novak Djokovic	9,370	11 July
2	(Russia) Daniil Medvedev	7,070	13 September
3	(Germany) Alexander Zverev	5,955	11 October
4	(Greece) Stefanos Tsitsipas	5,695	13 September
5	(Russia) Andrey Rublev	4,210	23 October
6	(Italy) Matteo Berrettini	4,090	25 October
7	(Poland) Hubert Hurkacz	3,315	5 November
8	(Norway) Casper Ruud	3,275	4 November
Berrettini and Tsitsipas withdrew due to injury.
9	(Italy) Jannik Sinner	3,015	16 November
10	(United Kingdom) Cameron Norrie	2,945	17 November

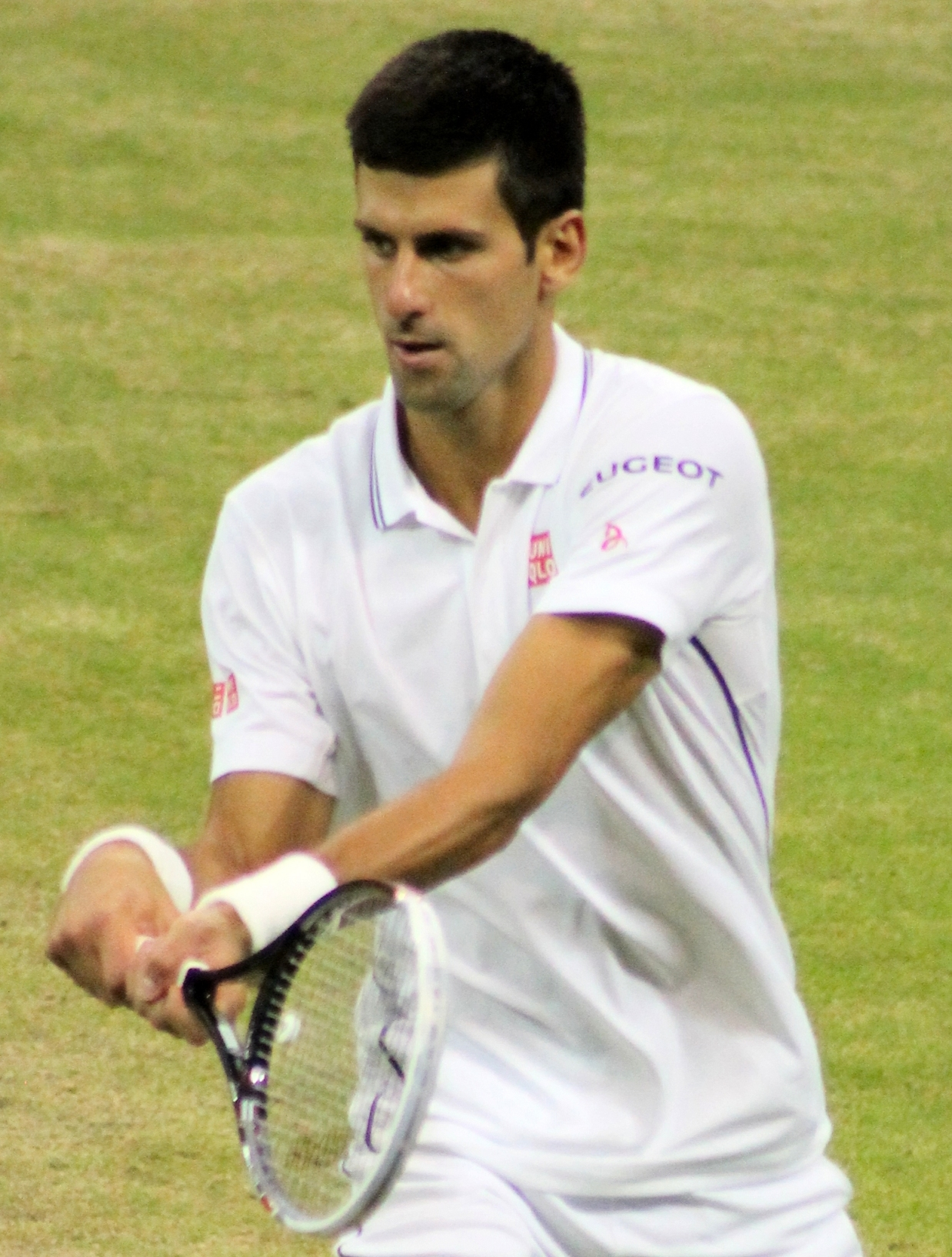
Djokovic

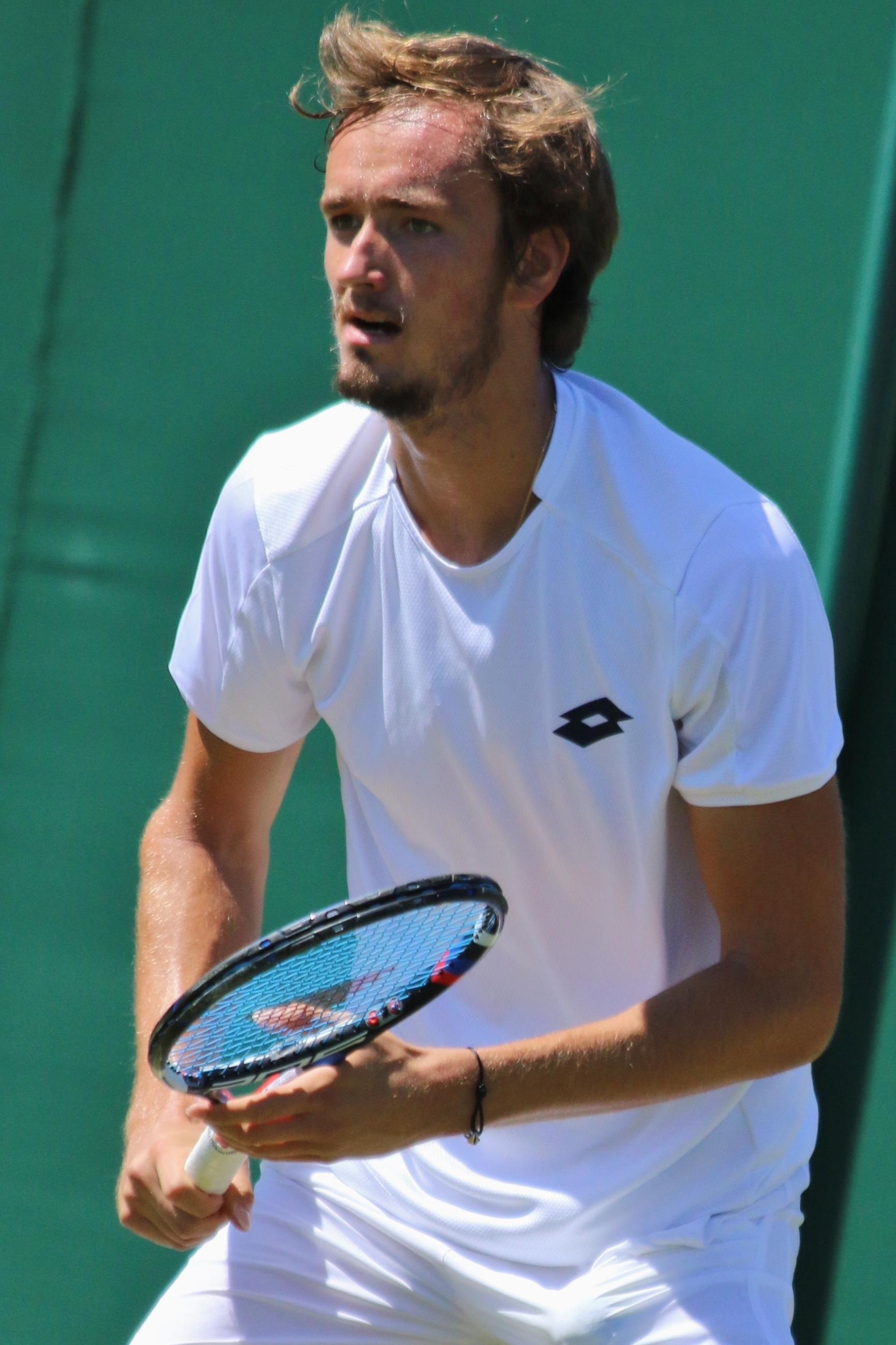
Medvedev

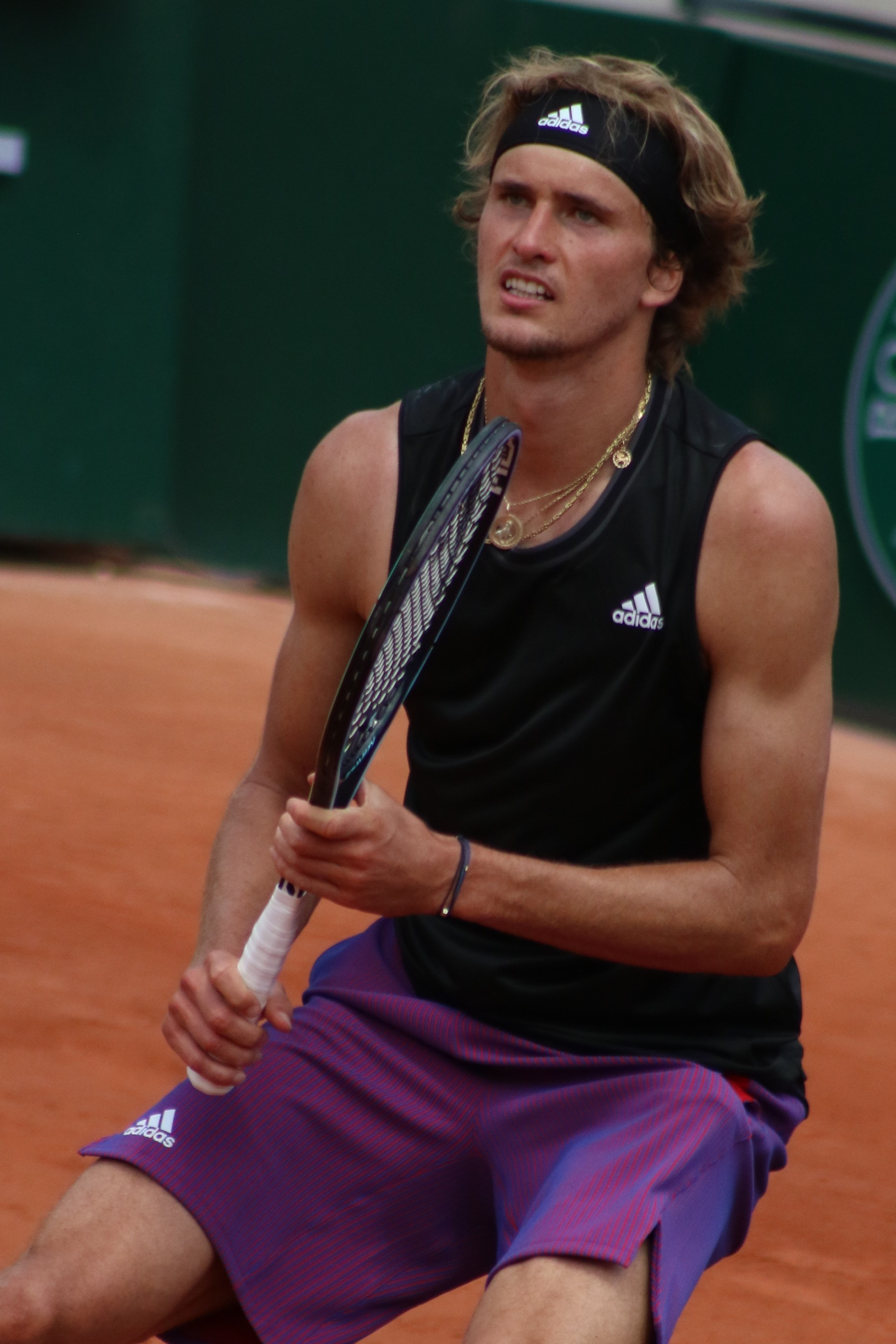
Zverev

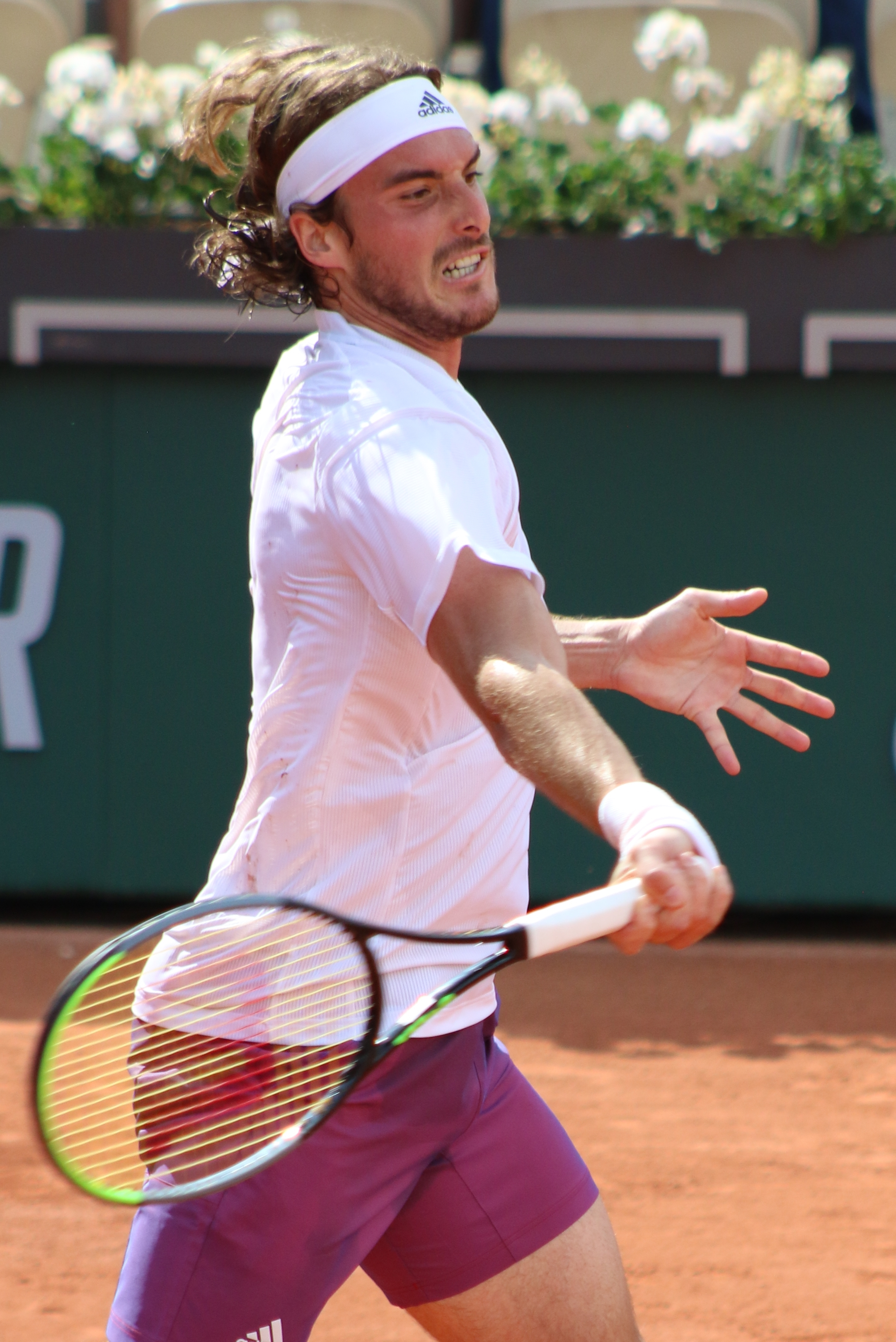
Tsitsipas

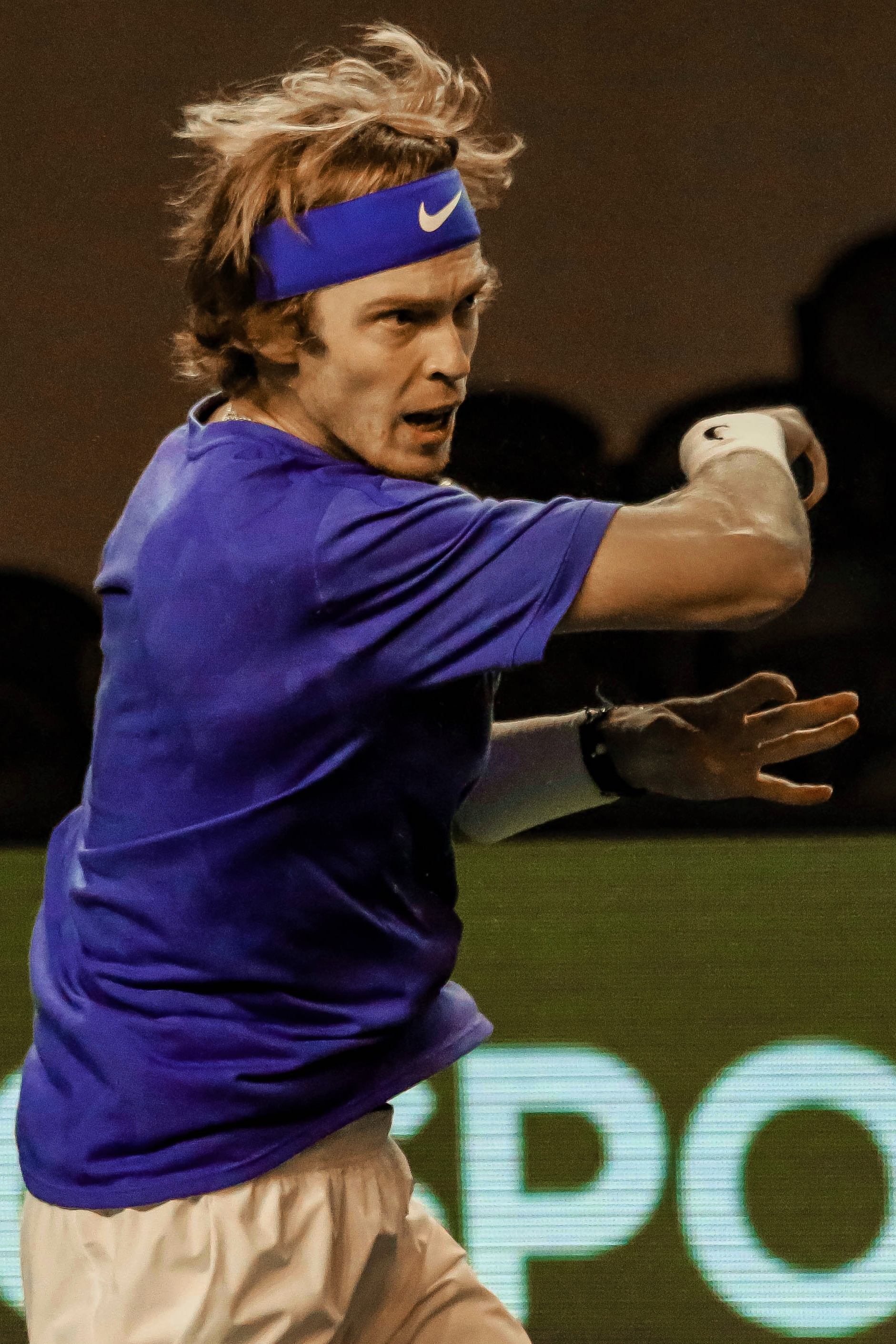
Rublev

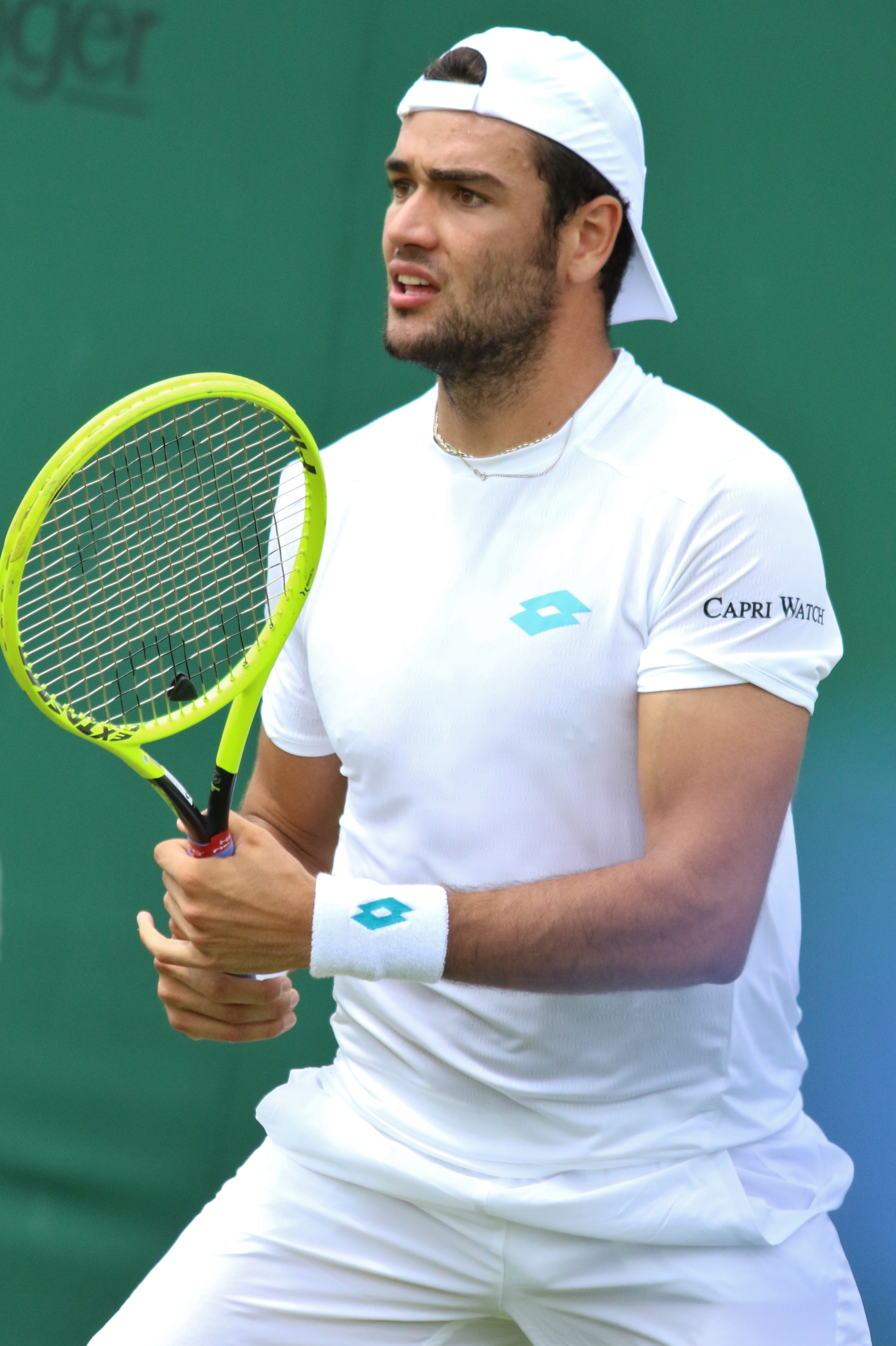
Berrettini

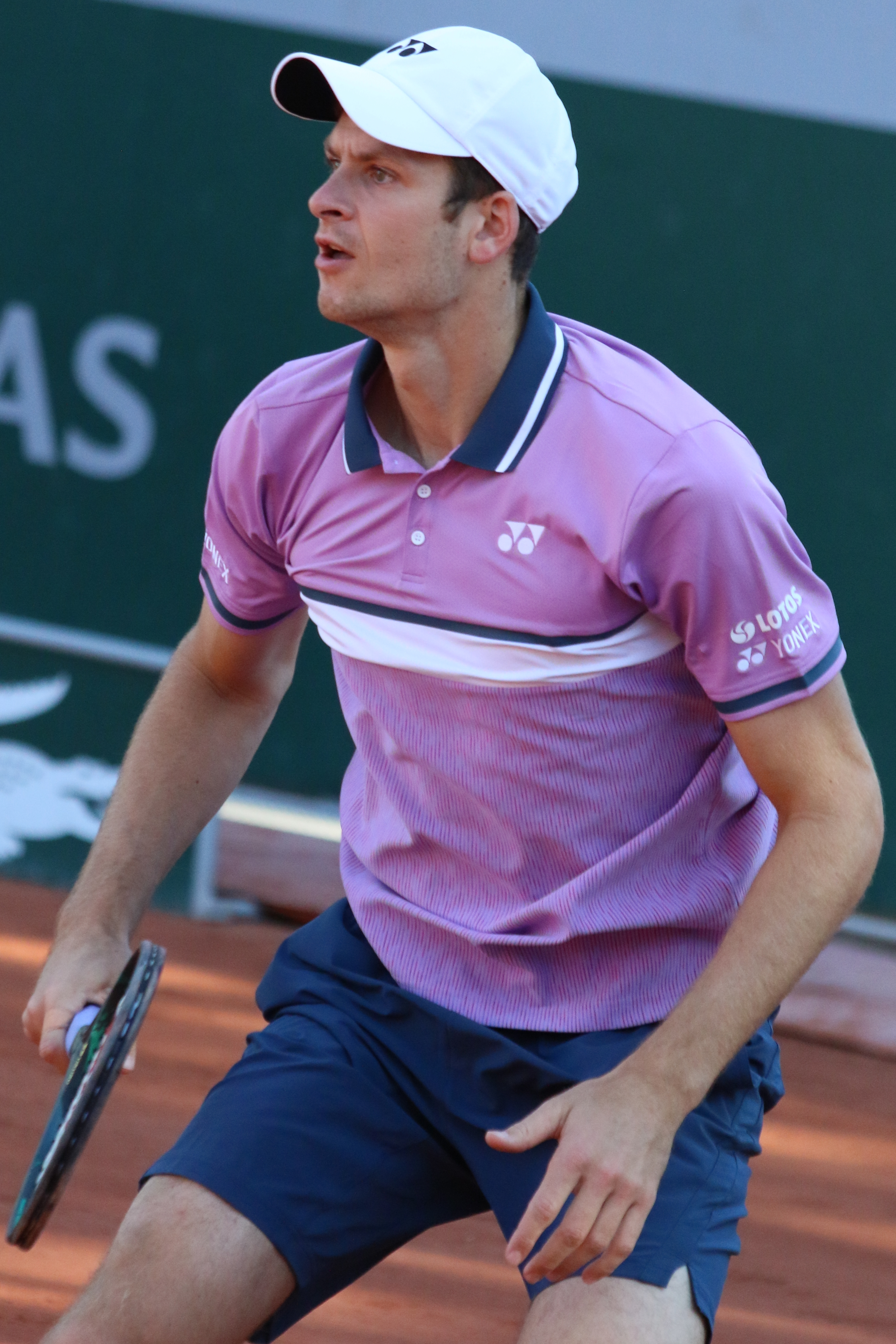
Hurkacz

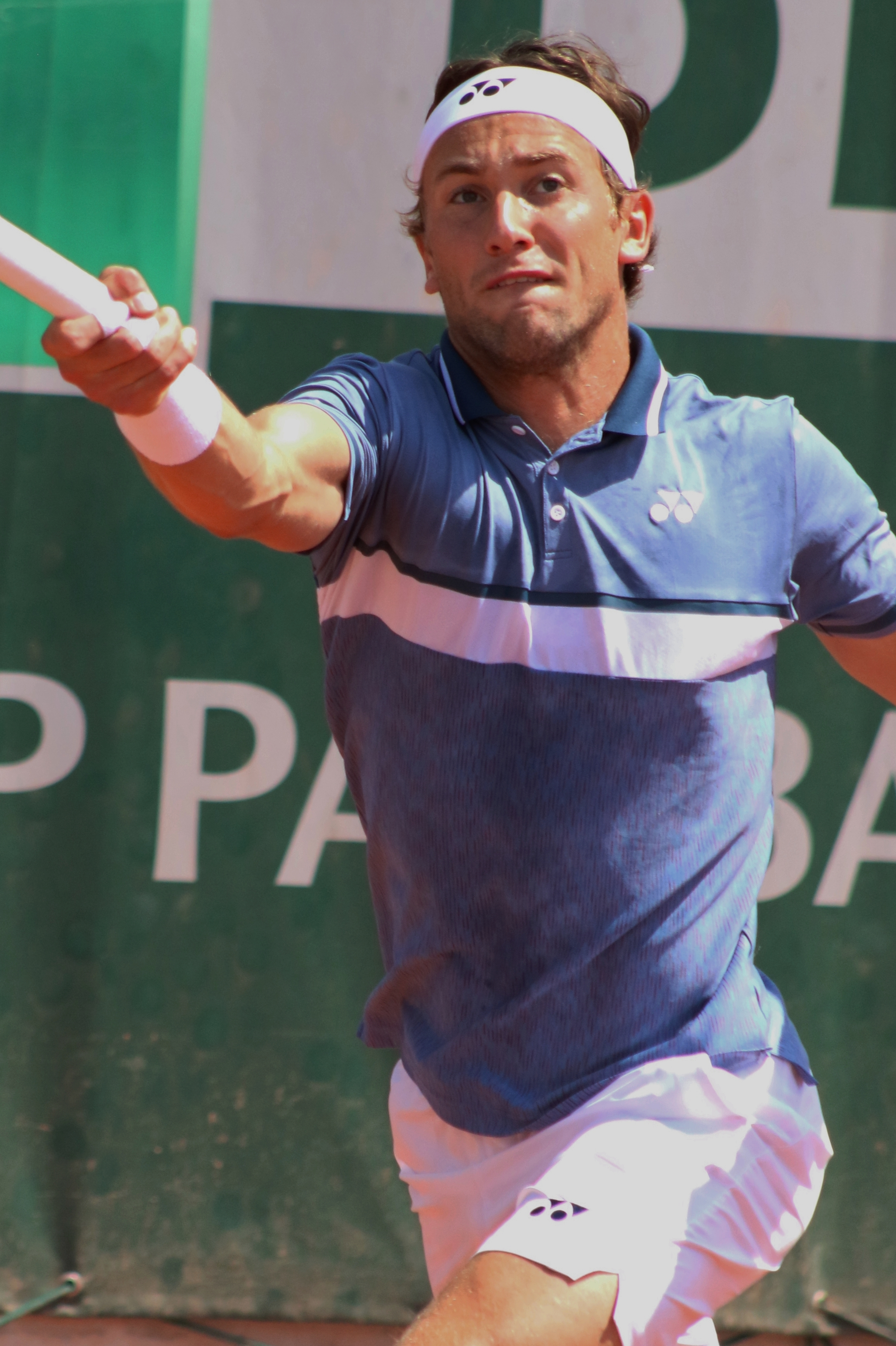
Ruud

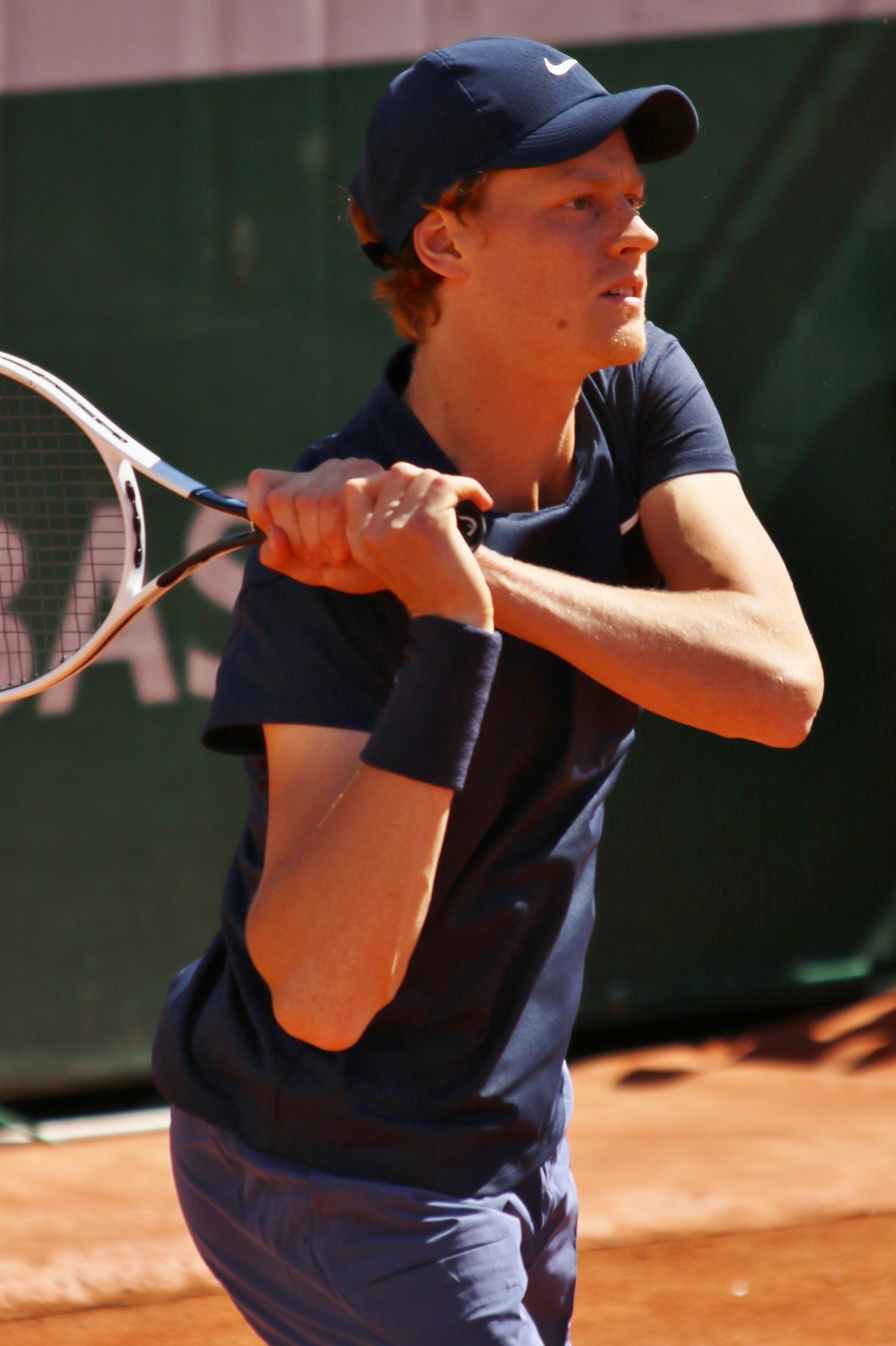
Sinner

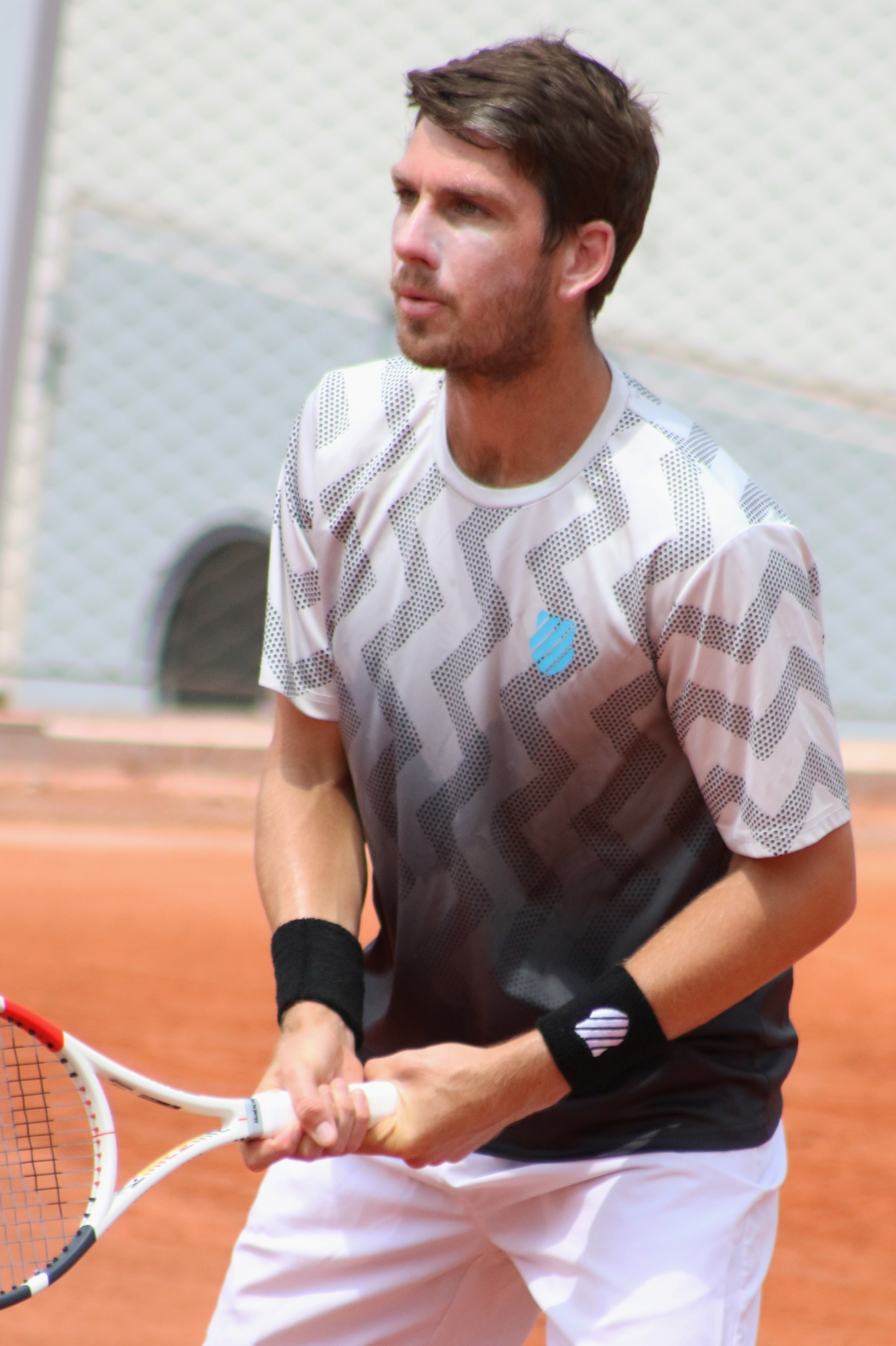
Norrie

=== Doubles ===
#	Players	Points	Date qualified
1	(Croatia) Nikola Mektić (Croatia) Mate Pavić	8,875	6 July
2	(United States) Rajeev Ram (United Kingdom) Joe Salisbury	7,185	3 September
3	(France) Pierre-Hugues Herbert (France) Nicolas Mahut	4,690	13 September
4	(Spain) Marcel Granollers (Argentina) Horacio Zeballos	4,535	30 September
5	(Colombia) Juan Sebastián Cabal (Colombia) Robert Farah	4,260	26 October
6	(Croatia) Ivan Dodig (Slovakia) Filip Polášek	3,230	20 October
7	(United Kingdom) Jamie Murray (Brazil) Bruno Soares	3,230	4 November
8	(Germany) Kevin Krawietz (Romania) Horia Tecău	3,110	4 November

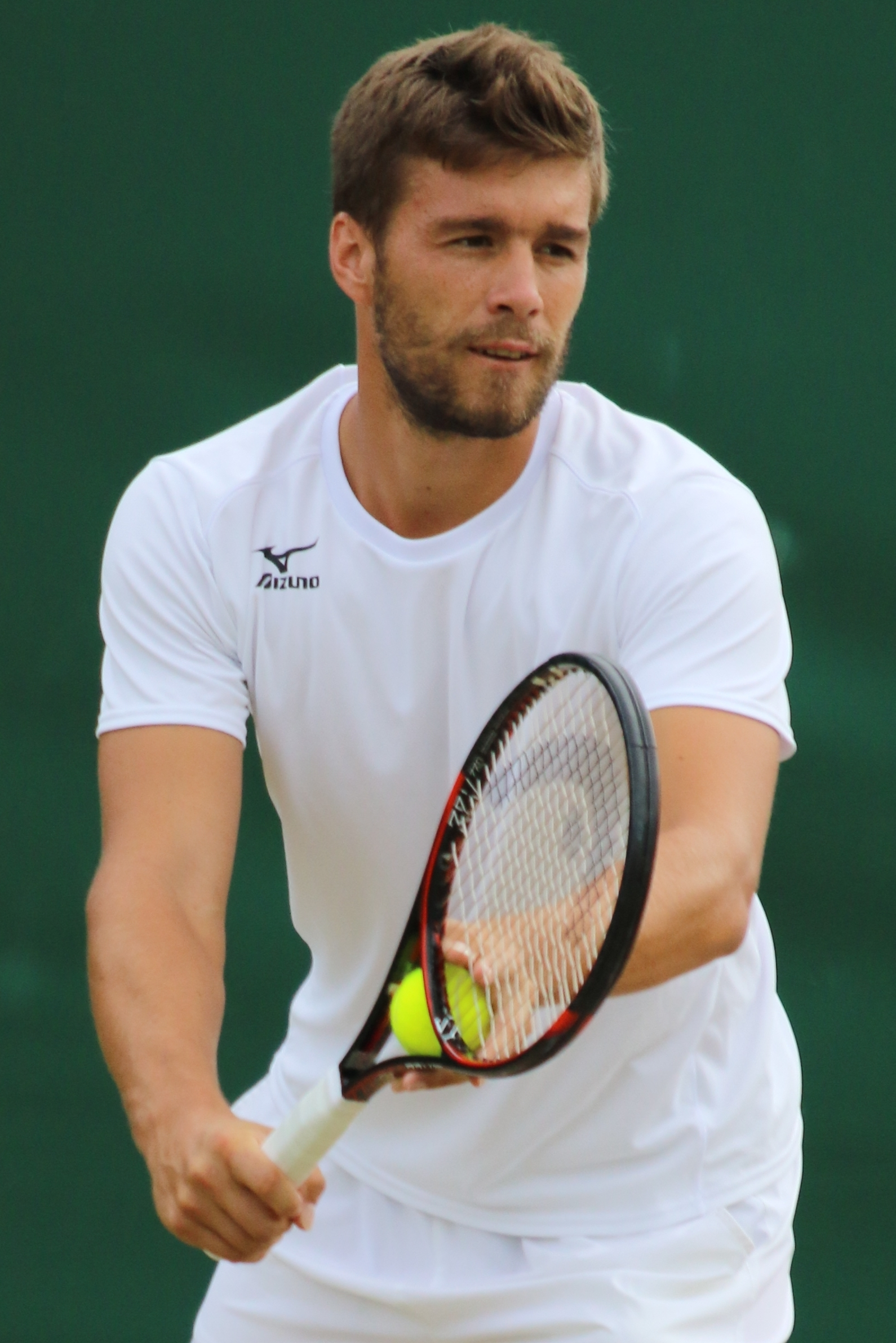
Mektić

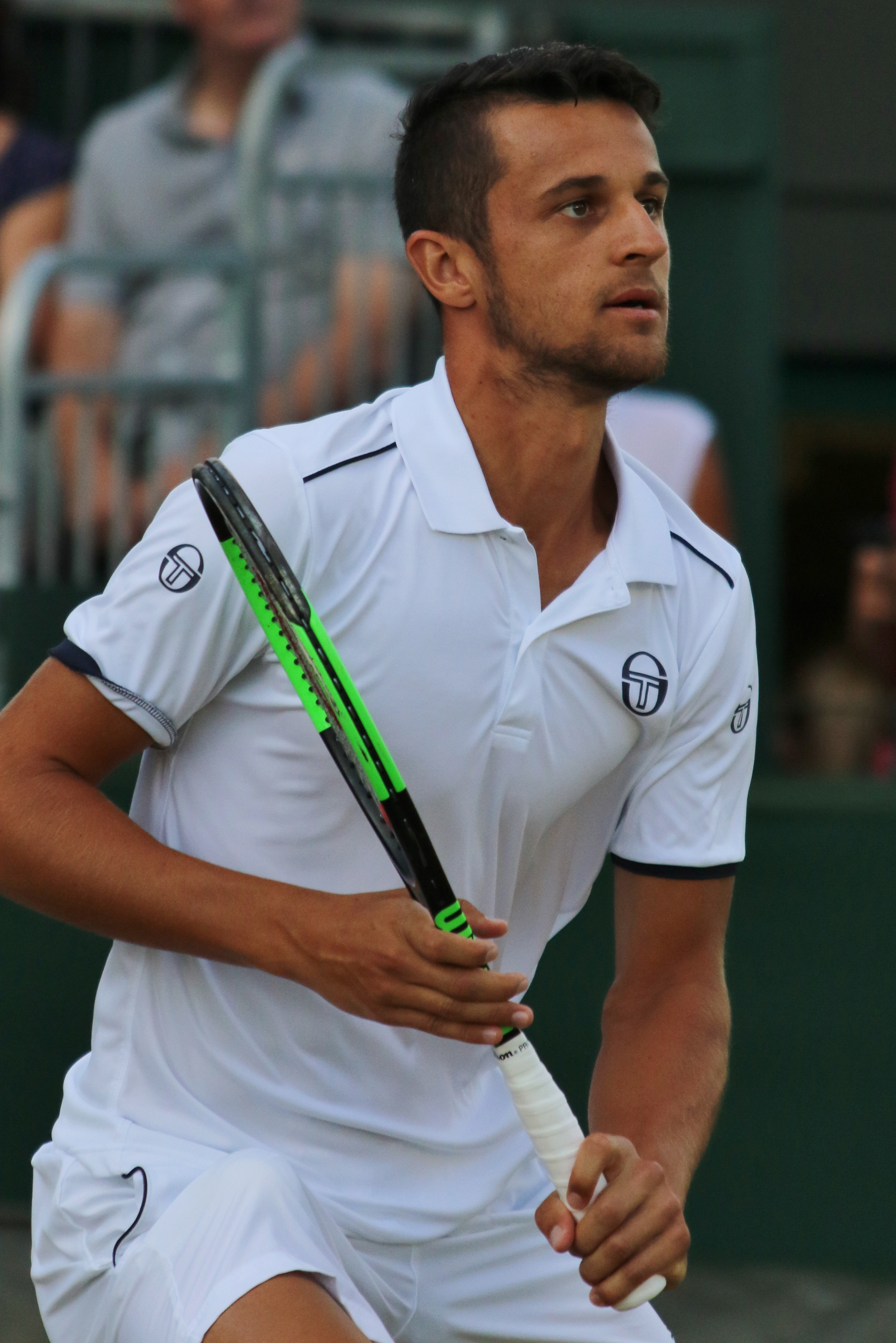
Pavić

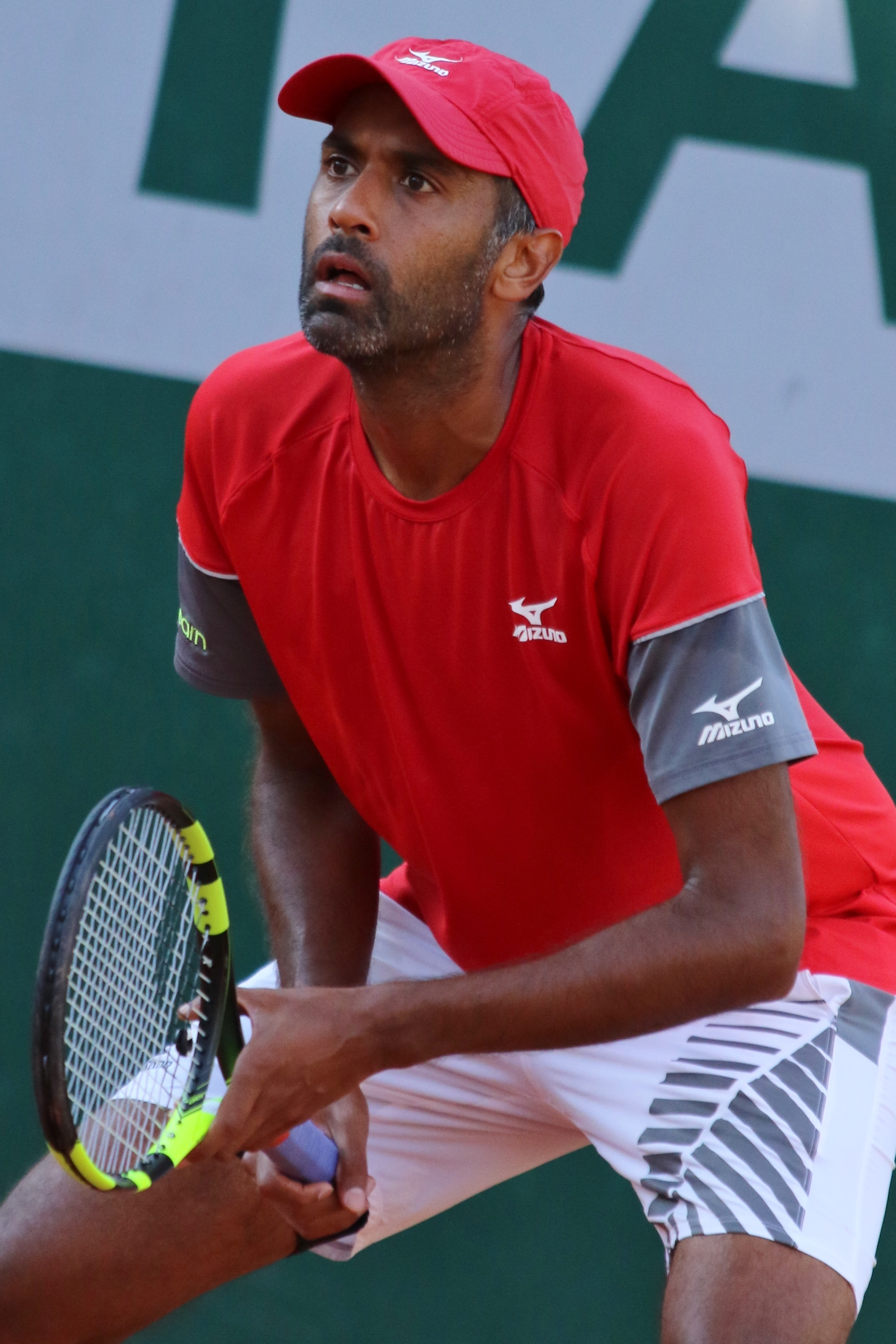
Ram

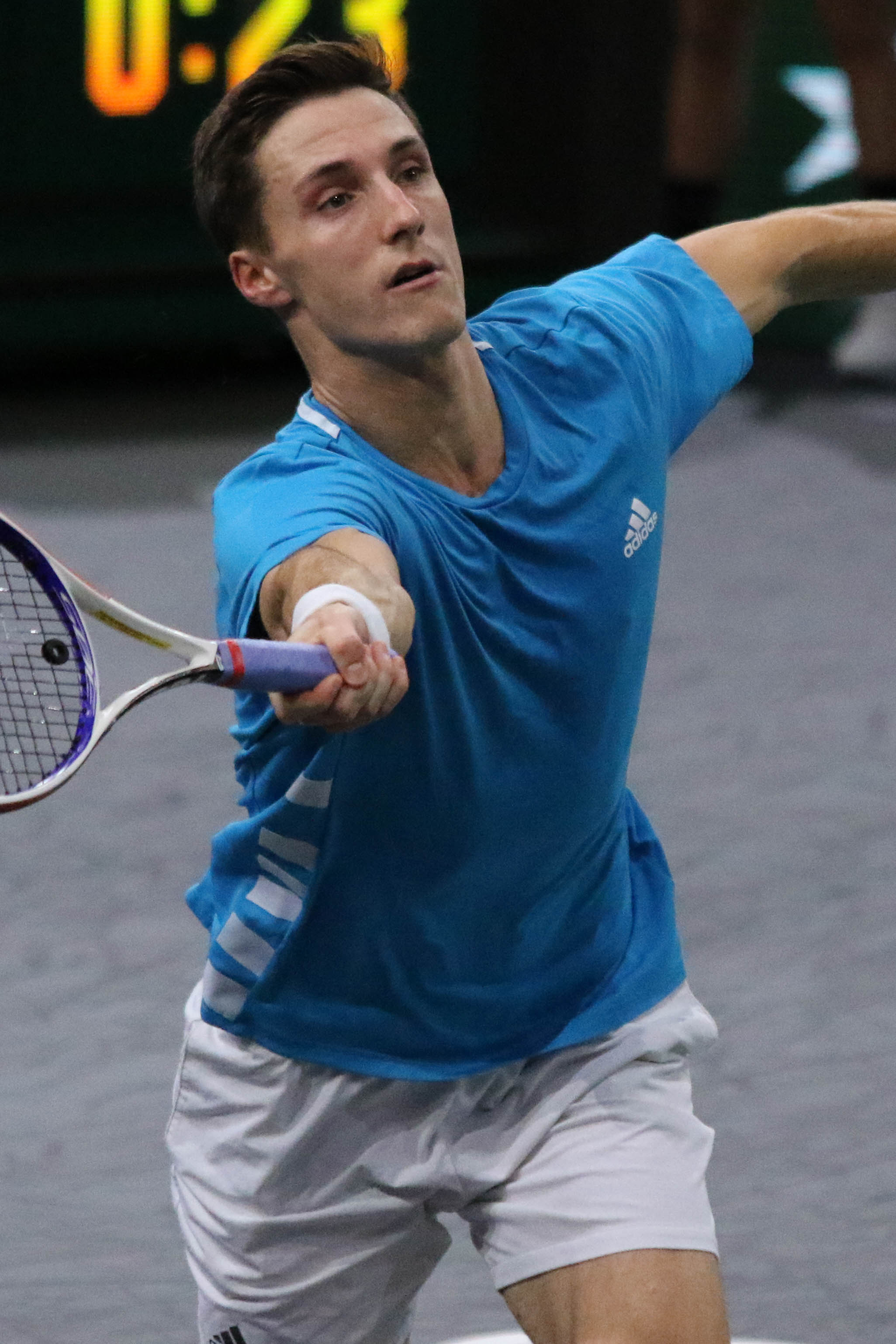
Salisbury

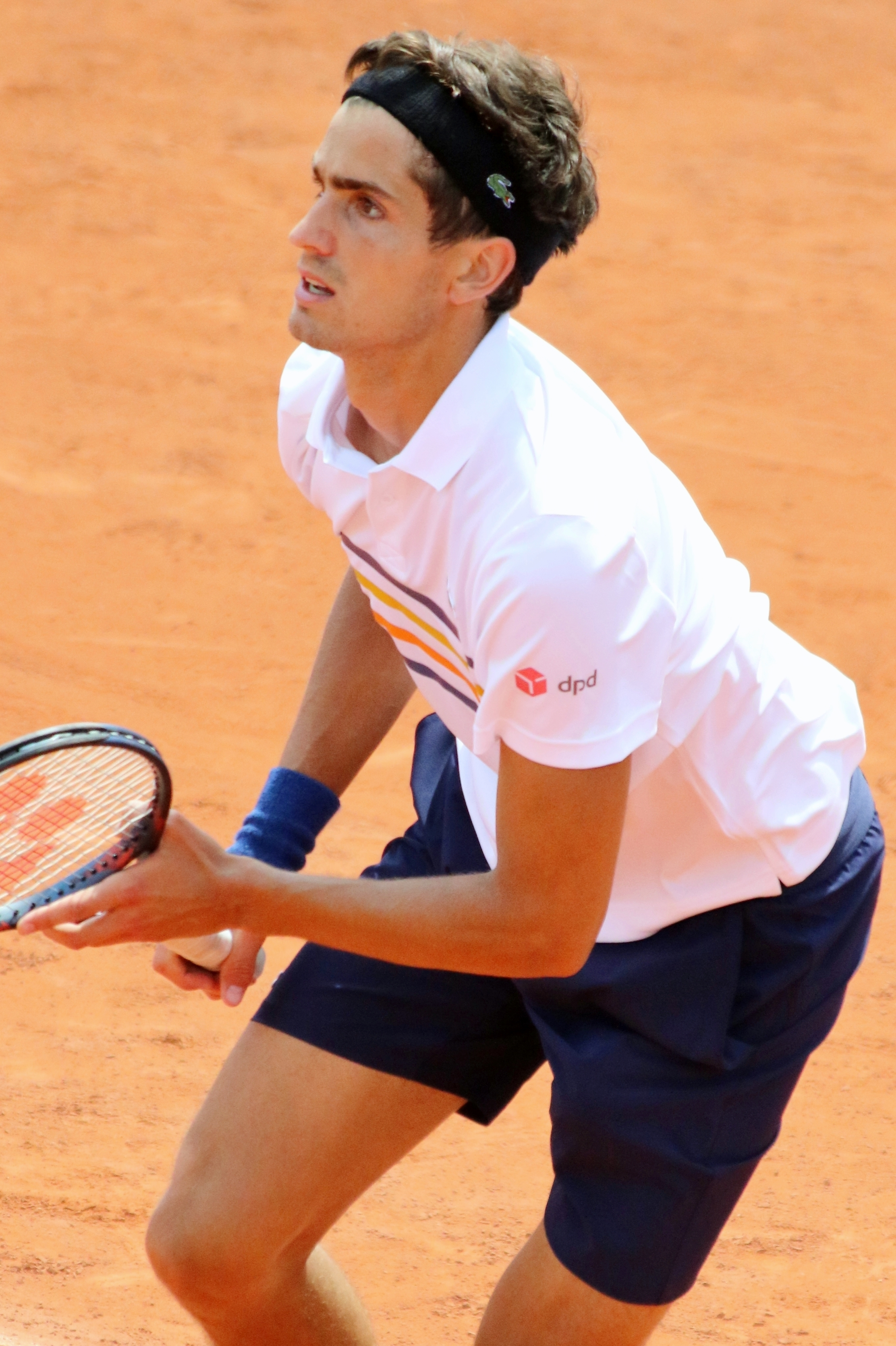
Herbert

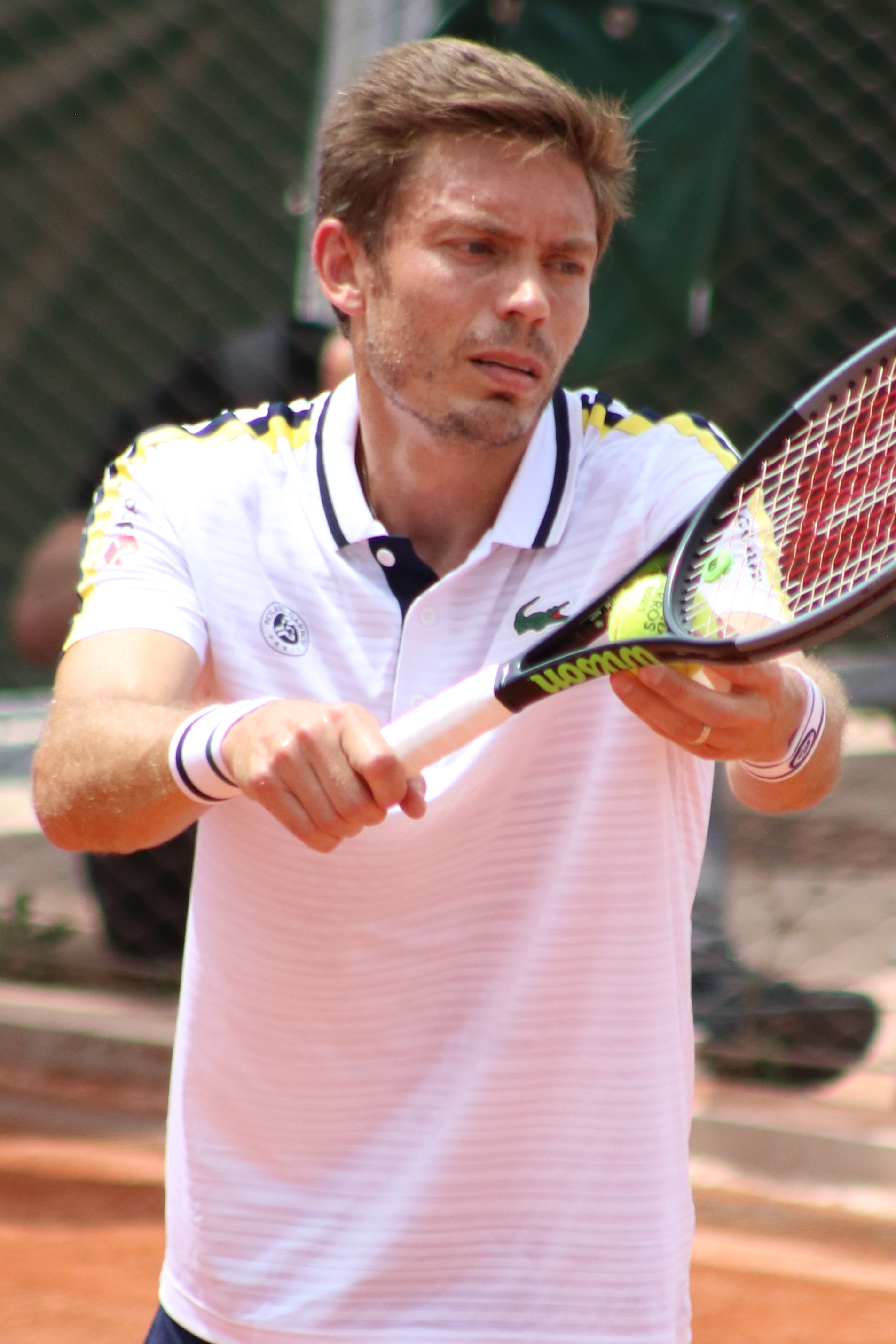
Mahut

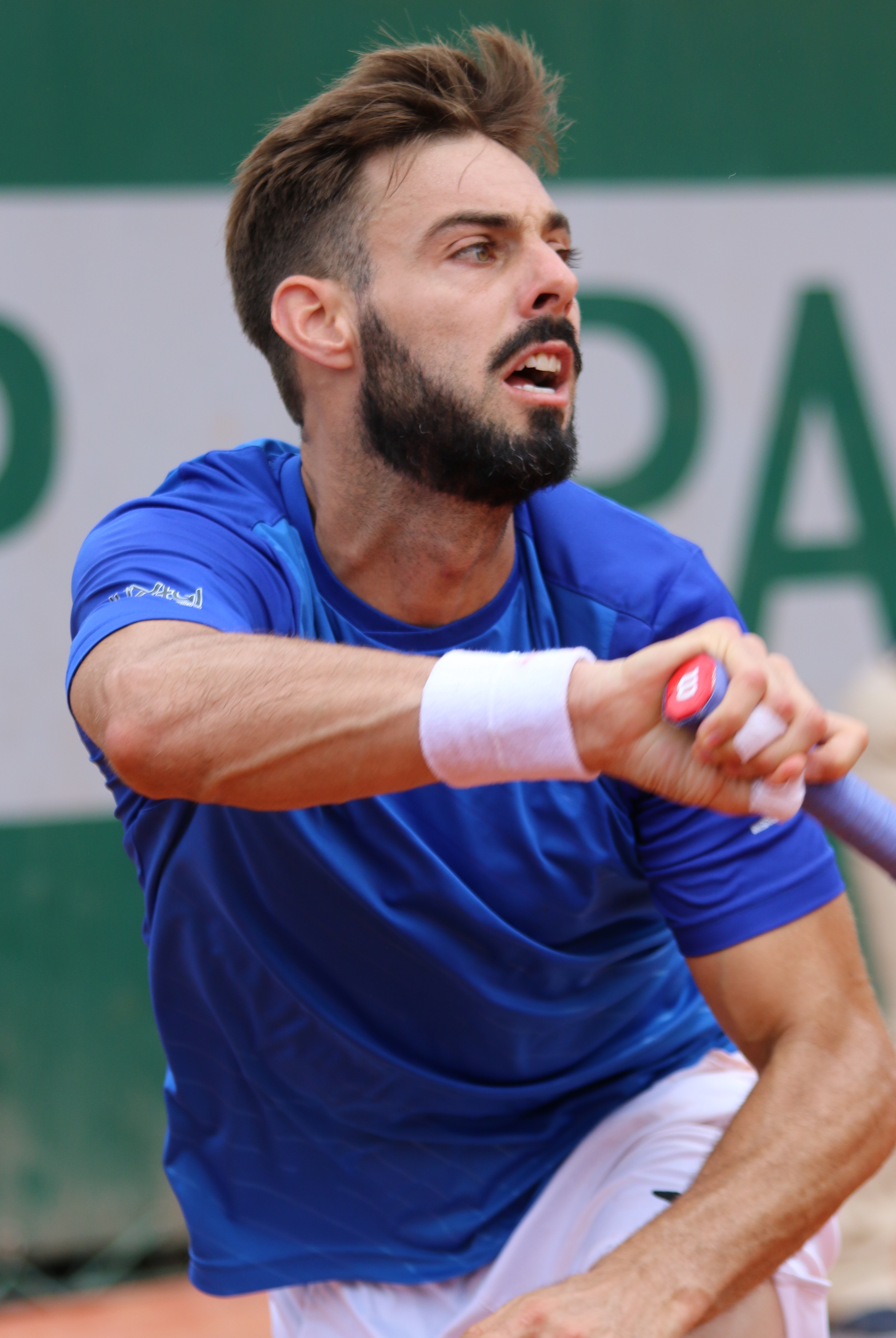
Granollers

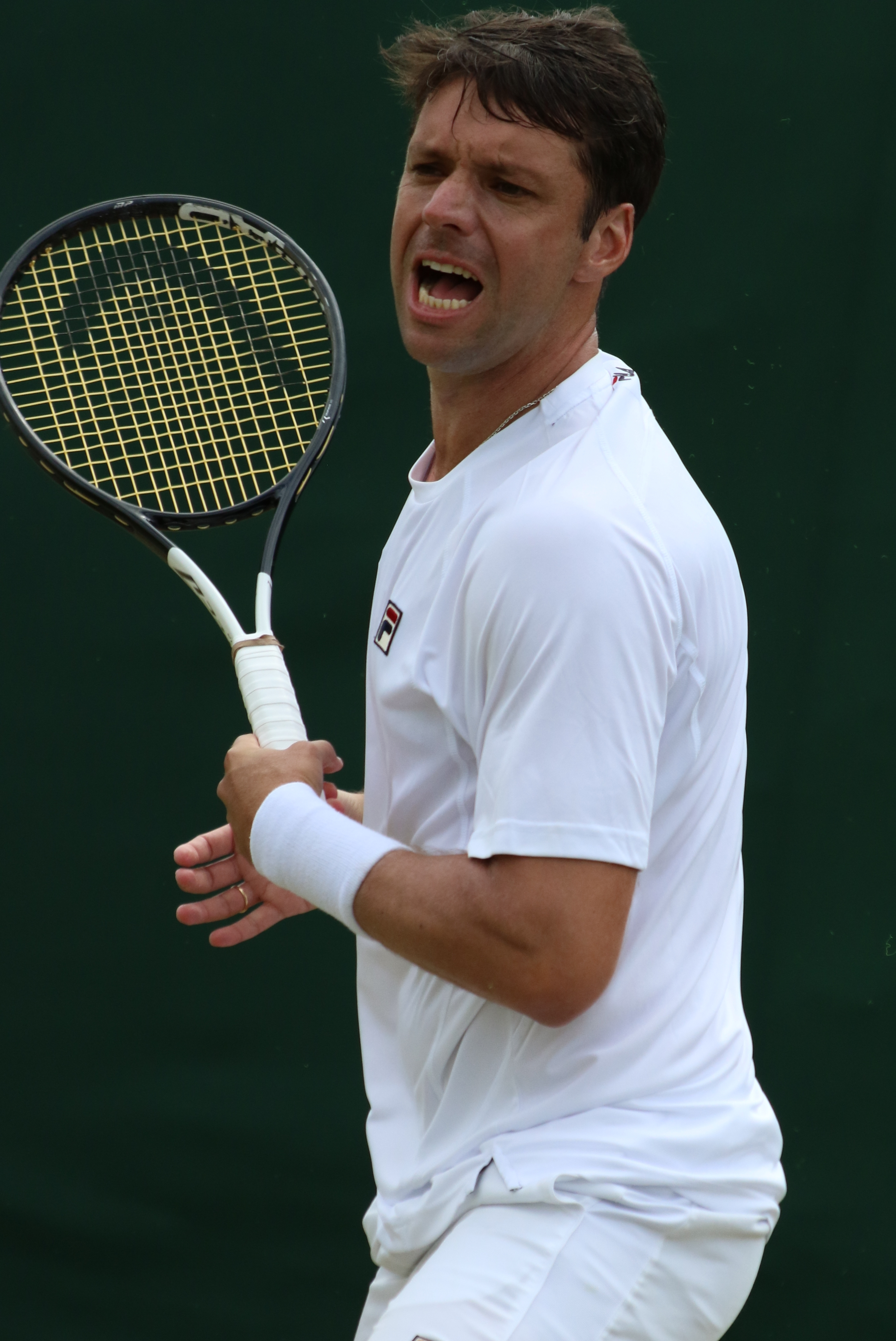
Zeballos

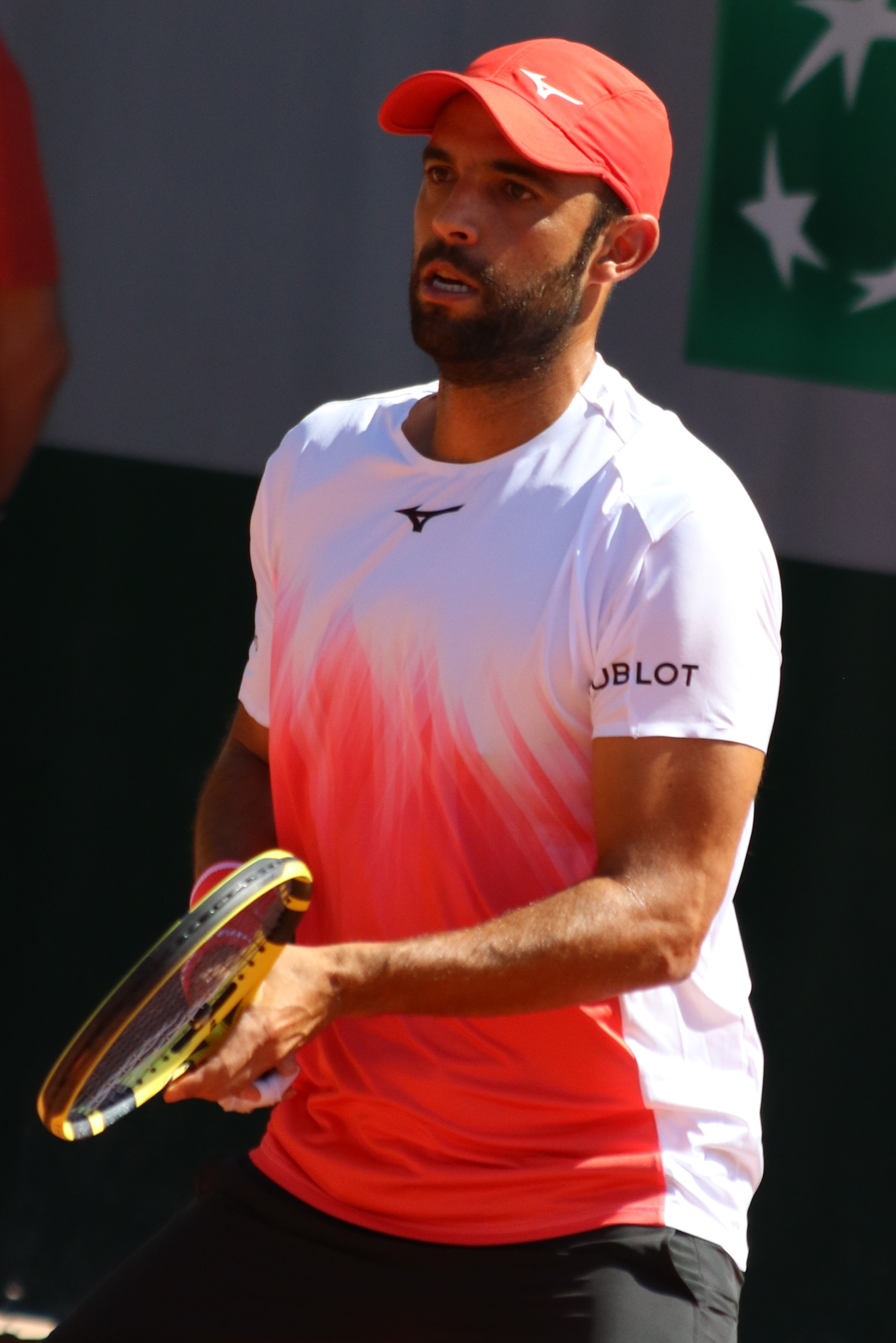
Cabal

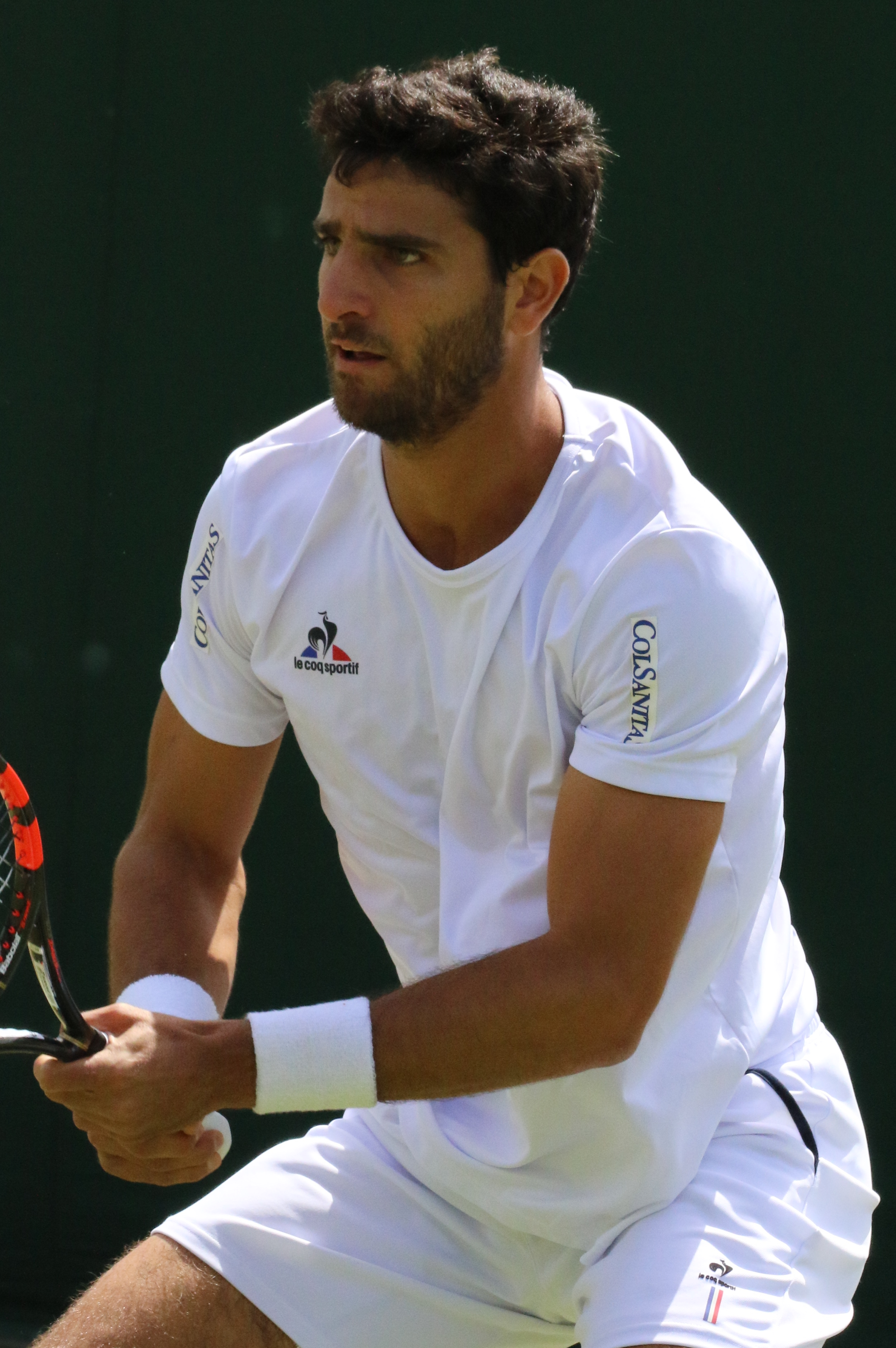
Farah

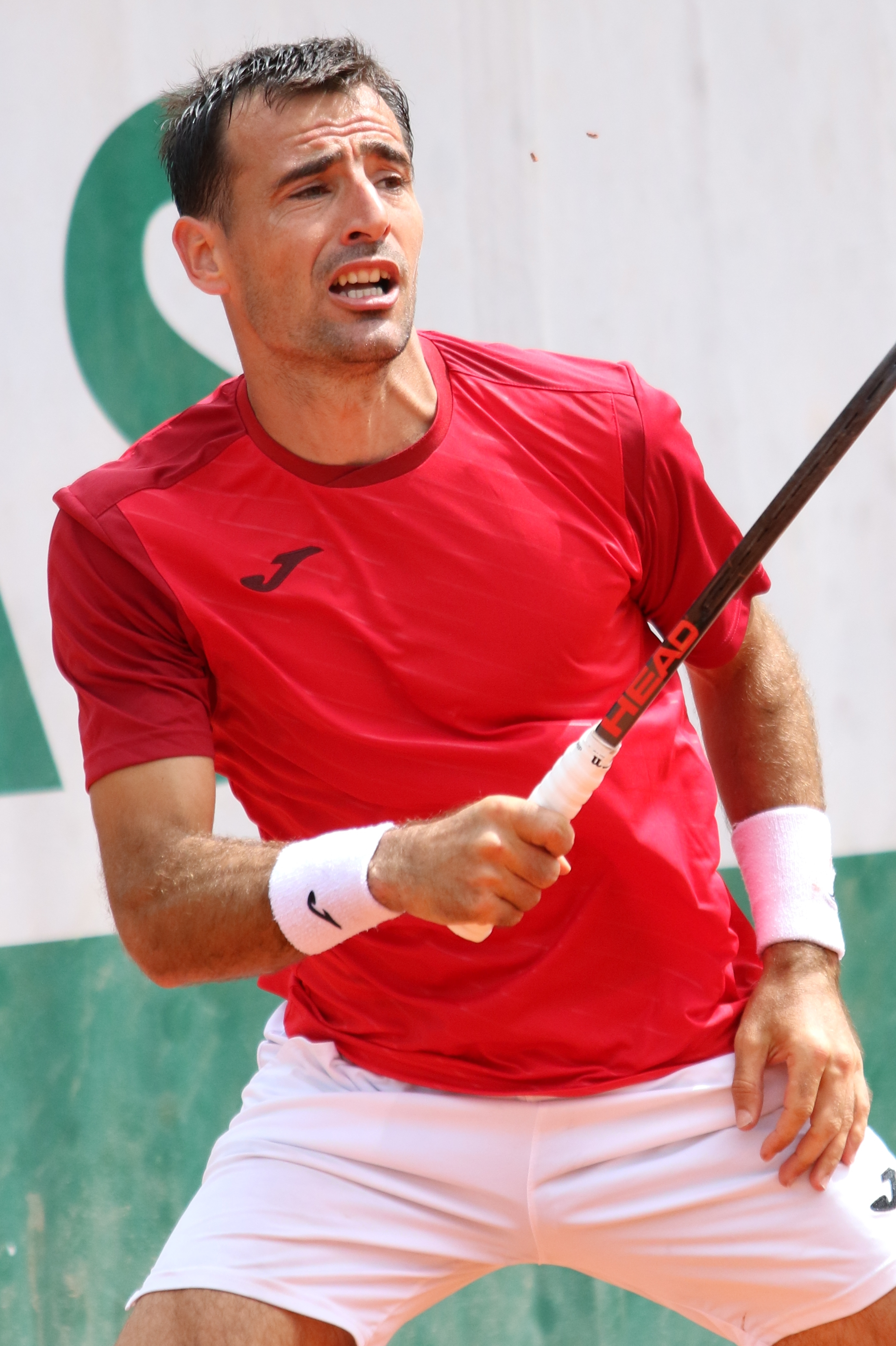
Dodig

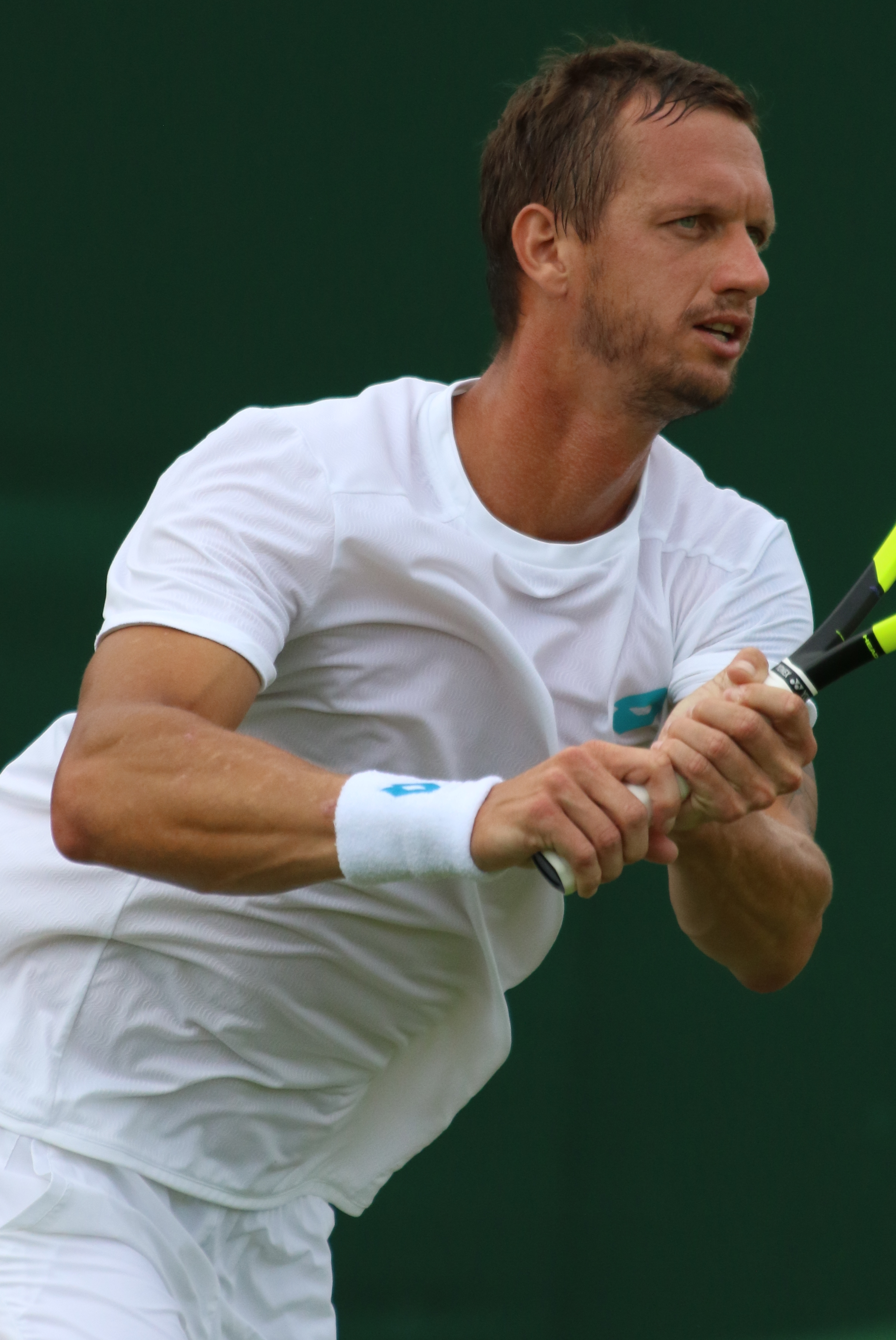
Polášek

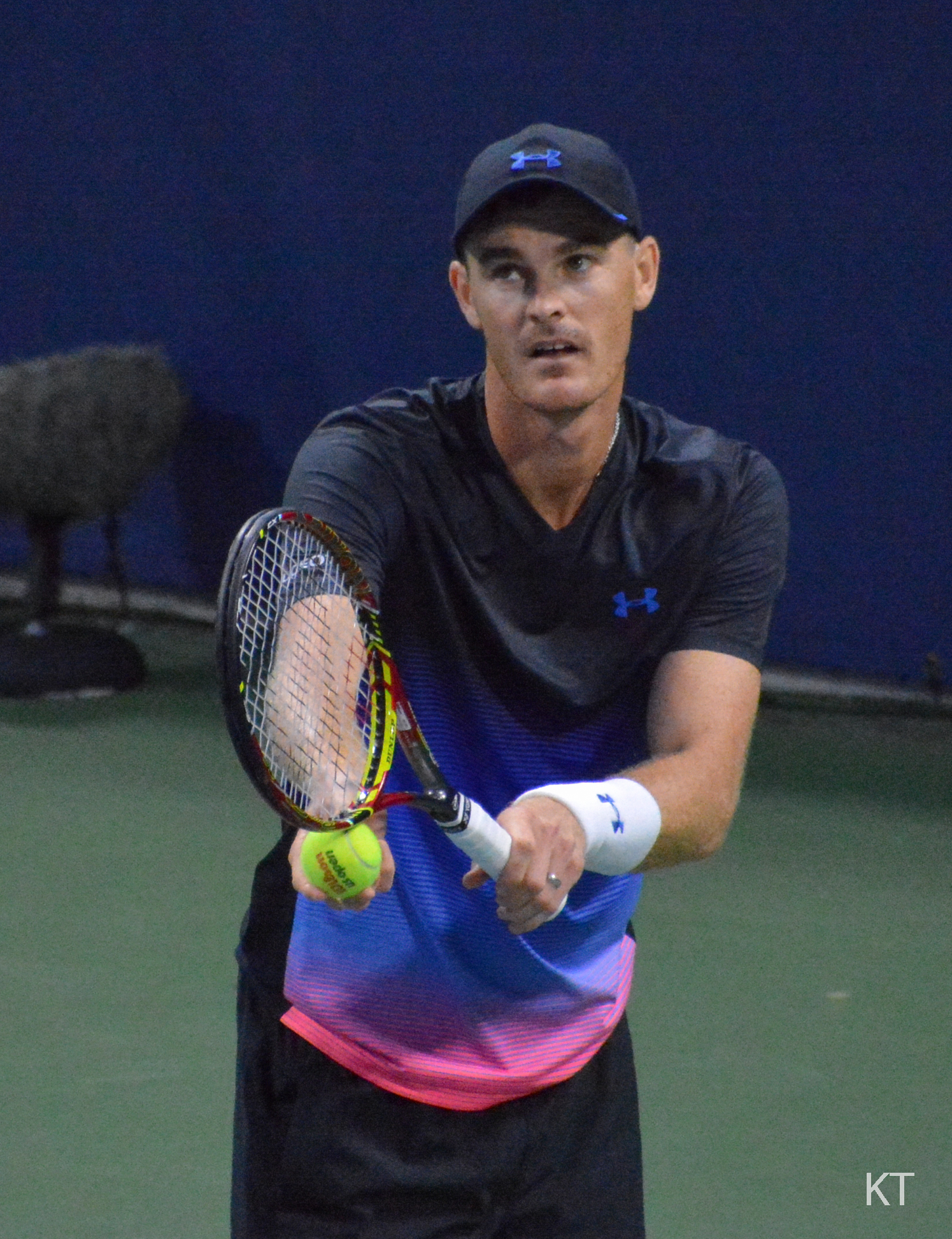
Murray

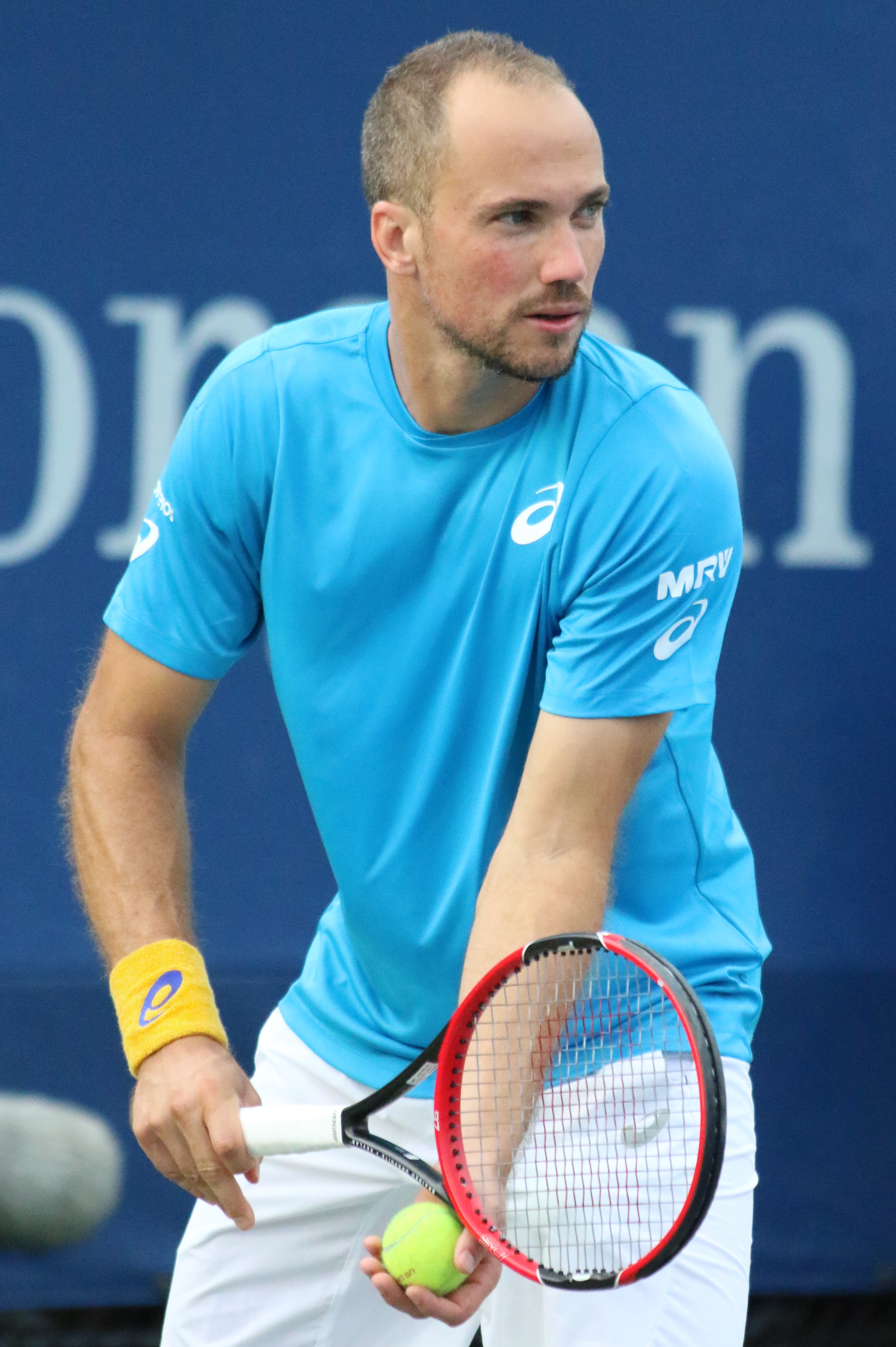
Soares

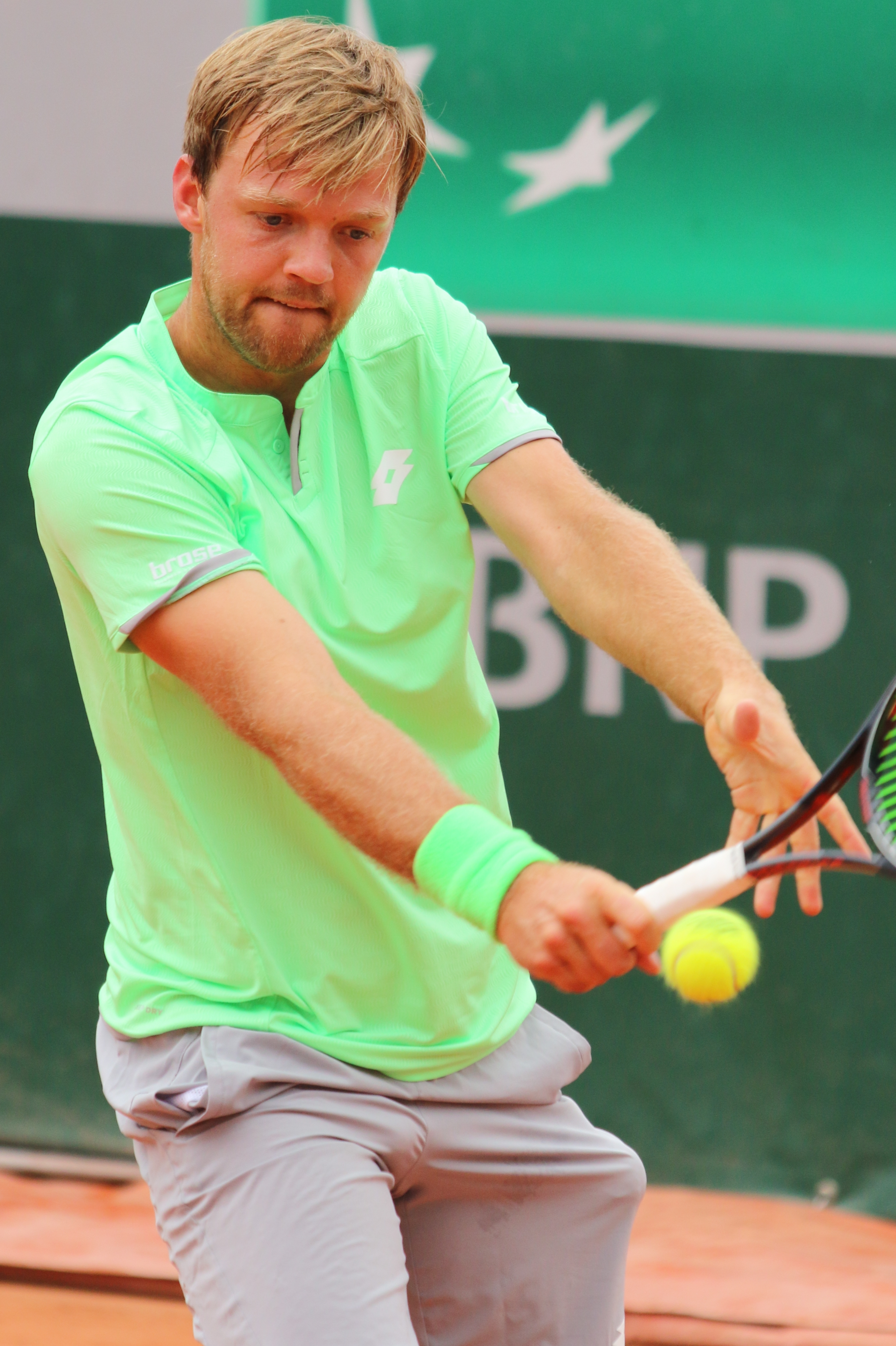
Krawietz

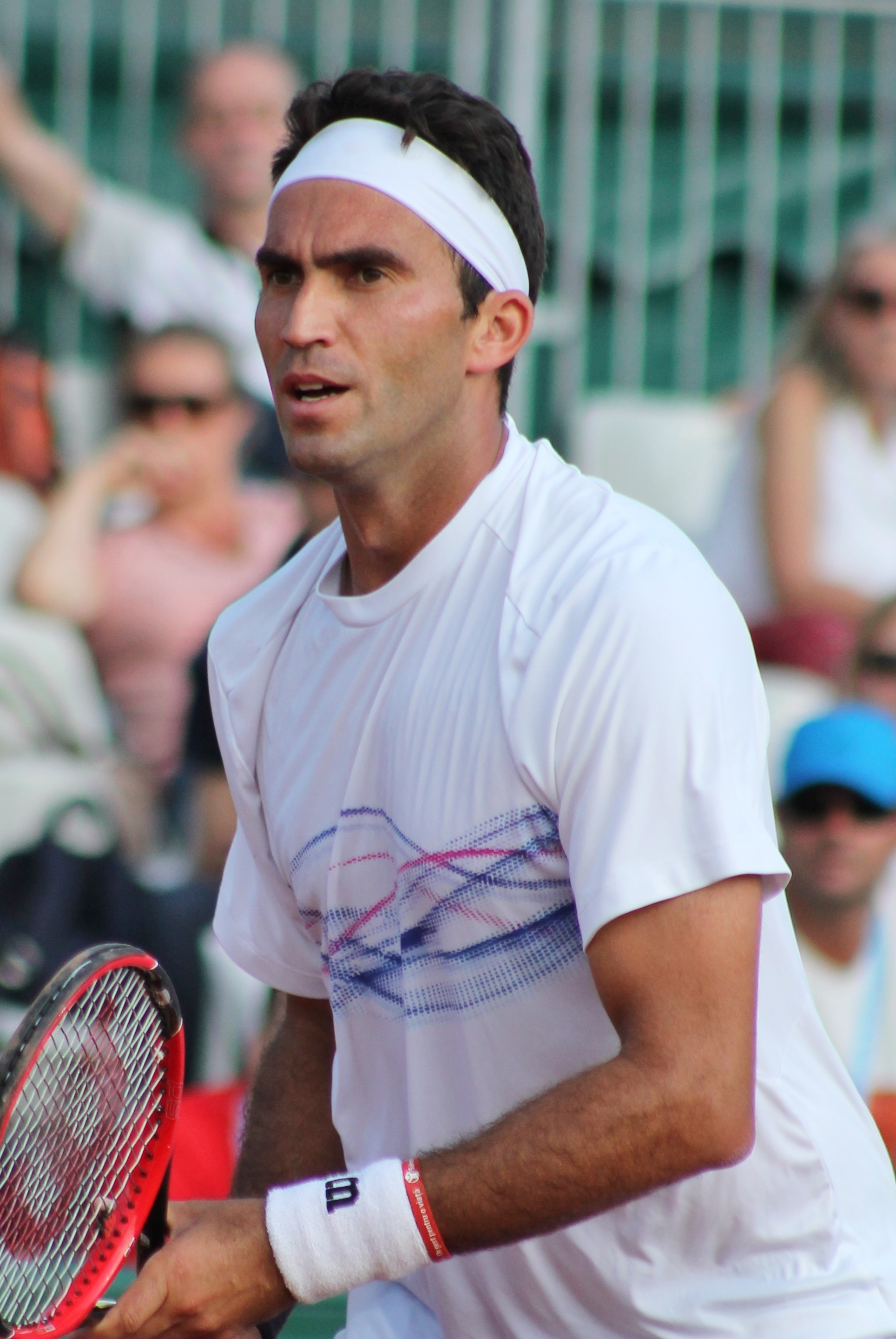
Tecău

== Groupings ==
=== Singles ===
The singles draw of the 2021 edition of the Year–end Championships will feature one number one, two major champions and three major finalists. The competitors were divided into two groups.

Green Group
(Serbia) Novak Djokovic [1]
(Greece) Stefanos Tsitsipas [4]
(Russia) Andrey Rublev [5]
(Norway) Casper Ruud [8]
Tsitsipas injury – November 17

(United Kingdom) Cameron Norrie [10]

| class="col-break " style=" padding-left: 4em;" |

Red Group
(Russia) Daniil Medvedev [2]
(Germany) Alexander Zverev [3]
(Italy) Matteo Berrettini [6]
(Poland) Hubert Hurkacz [7]
Berrettini injury – November 16

(Italy) Jannik Sinner [9]

=== Doubles ===
The doubles draw of the 2021 edition of the Year–end Championships will feature four number-ones, six major champions and one major finalist team. The pairs were divided into two groups.

Green Group
(Croatia) Nikola Mektić / (Croatia) Mate Pavić [1]
(Spain) Marcel Granollers / (Argentina) Horacio Zeballos [4]
(Croatia) Ivan Dodig / (Slovakia) Filip Polášek [6]
(Germany) Kevin Krawietz / (Romania) Horia Tecău [8]

| class="col-break " style=" padding-left: 4em;" |

Red Group
(United States) Rajeev Ram / (United Kingdom) Joe Salisbury [2]
(France) Pierre-Hugues Herbert / (France) Nicolas Mahut [3]
(Colombia) Juan Sebastián Cabal / (Colombia) Robert Farah [5]
(United Kingdom) Jamie Murray / (Brazil) Bruno Soares [7]

== Points breakdown ==
=== Singles ===
Player qualified for the ATP Finals.
Player withdrew due to injury.

Rank	Player	Grand Slam				ATP Masters 1000 (Note: The Shanghai Masters was cancelled due to the impact of the COVID-19 pandemic in mainland China.)								Best other							Total points	Tourn
Rank	Player	AUS	FRA	WIM	USO	MI	MC	MA	IT	CA	CI	IW (Note: The Indian Wells Masters, usually the first Masters of the season, was rescheduled to October due to the COVID-19 pandemic.)	PA	1	2	3	4	5	6	7	Total points	Tourn
1	(Serbia) Novak Djokovic	W 2000	W 2000	W 2000	F 1200	A 0	R16; 90	A 0	F 600	A 0	A 0	A 0	W 1000	W 250	RR; 140	SF; 90					9,370	10
2	(Russia) Daniil Medvedev	F 1200	QF; 360	R16; 180	W 2000	QF; 180	A 0	R16; 90	R32; 10	W 1000	SF; 360	R16; 90	F 600	W 500	W 250	W 250	R32; 0	R32; 0			7,070	16
3	(Germany) Alexander Zverev	QF; 360	SF; 720	R16; 180	SF; 720	R64; 10	R16; 90	W 1000	QF; 180	A 0	W 1000	QF; 180	SF; 360	W 500	W 500	SF; 65	R16; 45	QF; 45	R32; 0		5,955	17
4	(Greece) Stefanos Tsitsipas	SF; 720	F 1200	QF; 45	R32; 90	QF; 180	W 1000	R16; 90	QF; 180	SF; 360	SF; 360	QF; 180	R32; 10	F 300	F 300	W 250	SF; 180	RR; 115	QF; 90	R16; 45	5,695	20
5	(Russia) Andrey Rublev	QF; 360	QF; 45	R16; 180	R32; 90	SF; 360	F 600	R16; 90	QF; 180	R16; 90	F 600	R32; 45	R32; 10	W 500	W 310	F 300	SF; 180	QF; 90	SF; 90	SF; 90	4,210	21
6	(Italy) Matteo Berrettini	R16; 180	QF; 360	F 1200	QF; 360	A 0	R32; 10	F 600	R16; 90	A 0	R16; 90	R32; 45	A 0	W 500	F 270	W 250	QF; 90	QF; 45			4,090	14
7	(Poland) Hubert Hurkacz	R128; 10	R128; 10	SF; 720	R64; 45	W 1000	R32; 45	R64; 10	R64; 10	QF; 180	R16; 90	QF; 180	SF; 360	W 250	W 250	R16; 45	R16; 45	QF; 45	R16; 20	R32; 0	3,315	22
8	(Norway) Casper Ruud	R16; 180	R32; 90	SF; 90	R64; 45	QF; 45	SF; 360	SF; 360	QF; 45	QF; 180	QF; 180	R16; 90	QF; 180	W 250	W 250	W 250	W 250	W 250	QF; 90	QF; 90	3,275	21
Alternates
9	(Italy) Jannik Sinner	QF; 45	R16; 180	R16; 20	R16; 180	F 600	R32; 45	R32; 45	R32; 45	R32; 10	R32; 45	R16; 90	R32; 10	W 500	W 250	W 250	W 250	SF; 180	SF; 180	QF; 90	3,015	25
–	(Spain) Rafael Nadal	QF; 360	SF; 720	A 0	A 0	A 0	QF; 180	QF; 180	W 1000	A 0	A 0	A 0	A 0	W 500	R16; 45						2,985	7
10	(United Kingdom) Cameron Norrie	R32; 90	R32; 90	R32; 90	SF; 90	R32; 45	R16; 65	R16; 45	R32; 70	R16; 45	QF; 45	W 1000	R16; 90	F 300	W 250	F 150	F 150	F 150	QF; 90	QF; 90	2,945	24
–	(Canada) Félix Auger-Aliassime	R16; 180	R128; 10	QF; 360	SF; 720	R32; 45	R16; 45	R64; 10	R16; 90	R32; 10	QF; 180	R64; 10	R32; 45	SF; 180	F 150	F 150	QF; 90	QF; 90	QF; 90	SF; 90	2,545	22
11	(Russia) Aslan Karatsev	SF; 745	R64; 45	R128; 10	R32; 90	R32; 45	R32; 45	R16; 90	R16; 90	R32; 45	R64; 10	R16; 90	R64; 10	W 500	W 250	F 150	R16; 45	QF; 45	R16; 20	R16; 0	2,290	21

* Ranking points in italics indicate that a player used a better result than in a Grand Slam or Masters 1000 tournament, because all events were non-mandatory this season.

=== Doubles ===
Team qualified for the ATP Finals.
Team could not qualify because they had a player who qualified separately with another partner.

Rank	Player	Points																			Total points	Tourn
Rank	Player	1	2	3	4	5	6	7	8	9	10	11	12	13	14	15	16	17	18	19	Total points	Tourn
1	(Croatia) Nikola Mektić (Croatia) Mate Pavić	W 2000	W 1000	W 1000	W 1000	SF; 720	F 600	F 600	W 500	F 300	W 250	W 250	W 250	QF; 180	QF; 90	QF; 90	QF; 45	R64; 0	R16; 0	R16; 0	8,875	19
2	(United States) Rajeev Ram (United Kingdom) Joe Salisbury	W 2000	F 1200	W 1000	SF; 720	F 600	SF; 360	F 300	QF; 180	SF; 180	SF; 180	F 150	R32; 90	R16; 90	R16; 90	R16; 0	R32; 0	R16; 0	R16; 0		7,140	18
3	(France) Pierre-Hugues Herbert (France) Nicolas Mahut	W 2000	F 600	W 500	QF; 360	QF; 360	QF; 180	QF; 180	SF; 180	F 150	R32; 90	R16; 90	R16; 0								4,690	12
4	(Spain) Marcel Granollers (Argentina) Horacio Zeballos	F 1200	W 1000	W 1000	QF; 360	SF; 360	F 300	QF; 180	R32; 90	QF; 45	R32; 0	R64; 0	R32; 0	R16; 0							4,535	13
5	(Colombia) Juan Sebastián Cabal (Colombia) Robert Farah	SF; 720	W 500	W 500	W 500	QF; 360	SF; 360	SF; 360	QF; 180	QF; 180	F 150	R32; 90	R16; 90	QF; 90	SF; 90	SF; 90	R64; 0	R32; 0	R32; 0	R16; 0	4,260	20
6	(Croatia) Ivan Dodig (Slovakia) Filip Polášek	W 2000	SF; 360	QF; 180	SF; 180	F 150	R32; 90	R32; 90	R16; 90	SF; 90	R16; 0	R16; 0	R16; 0								3,230	12
7	(United Kingdom) Jamie Murray (Brazil) Bruno Soares	F 1200	SF; 720	SF; 360	W 250	W 250	R16; 180	R32; 90	R16; 90	QF; 90	R32; 0	R32; 0	R32; 0	R16; 0	R16; 0	R16; 0					3,230	15
8	(Germany) Kevin Krawietz (Romania) Horia Tecău	W 500	QF; 360	QF; 360	SF; 360	F 300	F 300	F 300	QF; 180	QF; 180	R32; 90	R16; 90	R16; 90	R16; 0	R32; 0						3,110	14
Alternates
–	(Australia) John Peers (Slovakia) Filip Polášek	W 1000	SF; 720	SF; 360	SF; 180	F 150	R16; 90	R32; 0	R16; 0												2,500	8
9	(Italy) Simone Bolelli (Argentina) Máximo González	SF; 720	W 250	W 250	W 250	R16; 180	R16; 180	F 150	R32; 90	R16; 90	R16; 90	QF; 45	QF; 45	QF; 45	R32; 0	R32; 0	R32; 0	R16; 0	R16; 0	Q1; 0	2,385	19
10	(Germany) Tim Pütz (New Zealand) Michael Venus	W 1000	W 500	SF; 360	QF; 180	SF; 180	R64; 0	R64; 0	R32; 0	R16; 0											2,220	9

== Head-to-head records ==
Below are the head-to-head records as they approached the tournament.

=== Singles ===
Overall

		Djokovic	Medvedev	Zverev	Tsitsipas	Rublev	Berrettini	Hurkacz	Ruud	Overall	YTD W–L
1	(Serbia) Novak Djokovic		6–4	7–3	6–2	0–0	4–0	3–0	1–0	27–9	48–6
2	(Russia) Daniil Medvedev	4–6		5–5	6–2	4–1	2–0	1–1	2–0	24–15	54–12
3	(Germany) Alexander Zverev	3–7	5–5		3–6	5–0	3–1	1–0	2–0	22–19	55–14
4	(Greece) Stefanos Tsitsipas	2–6	2–6	6–3		4–3	2–0	6–2	1–1	23–21	55–18
5	(Russia) Andrey Rublev	0–0	1–4	0–5	3–4		2–3	0–2	4–0	10–18	48–20
6	(Italy) Matteo Berrettini	0–4	0–2	1–3	0–2	3–2		2–1	2–2	8–16	41–11
7	(Poland) Hubert Hurkacz	0–3	1–1	0–1	2–6	2–0	1–2		0–0	6–12	36–20
8	(Norway) Casper Ruud	0–1	0–2	0–2	1–1	0–4	2–2	0–0		3–12	53–15

=== Doubles ===
		Mektić; Pavić	Ram; Salisbury	Herbert; Mahut	Granollers; Zeballos	Cabal; Farah	Dodig; Polášek	Murray; Soares	Krawietz; Tecău	Overall	YTD W–L
1	(Croatia) Nikola Mektić (Croatia) Mate Pavić		4–1	2–0	2–1	0–1	2–1	0–0	2–0	12–4	59–11
2	(United States) Rajeev Ram (United Kingdom) Joe Salisbury	1–4		0–1	4–2	3–1	1–2	2–0	0–1	11–11	40–16
3	(France) Pierre-Hugues Herbert (France) Nicolas Mahut	0–2	1–0		0–2	5–2	0–0	2–2	0–0	8–8	30–11
4	(Spain) Marcel Granollers (Argentina) Horacio Zeballos	1–2	2–4	2–0		0–1	1–0	0–2	0–1	6–10	24–11
5	(Colombia) Juan Sebastián Cabal (Colombia) Robert Farah	1–0	1–3	2–5	1–0		1–0	3–7	1–0	10–15	36–18
6	(Croatia) Ivan Dodig (Slovakia) Filip Polášek	1–2	2–1	0–0	0–1	0–1		0–0	1–0	4–5	20–11
7	(United Kingdom) Jamie Murray (Brazil) Bruno Soares	0–0	0–2	2–2	2–0	7–3	0–0		0–1	11–8	25–13
8	(Germany) Kevin Krawietz (Romania) Horia Tecău	0–2	1–0	0–0	1–0	0–1	0–1	1–0		3–4	28–13

== See also ==
- ATP rankings
- 2021 WTA Finals
- 2021 Next Generation ATP Finals
- ATP Finals appearances
