= 2021 ATP Finals – Doubles =

2021 tennis tournament

Doubles
- 2021 ATP Finals

Final
- Champions: (France) Pierre-Hugues Herbert (France) Nicolas Mahut
- Runners-up: (United States) Rajeev Ram (United Kingdom) Joe Salisbury
- Score: 6–4, 7–6^{(7–0)}

Details
- Draw: 8 (round robin)

Events
Singles	Doubles
- ATP Finals

Pierre-Hugues Herbert and Nicolas Mahut defeated Rajeev Ram and Joe Salisbury in the final, 6–4, 7–6^{(7–0)} to win the doubles tennis title at the 2021 ATP Finals. It was their second ATP Finals title.

Wesley Koolhof and Nikola Mektić were the reigning champions, but only Mektić qualified this season after playing with Mate Pavić. Mektić and Pavić lost in the semifinals to Ram and Salisbury.

Pavić secured the individual year-end No. 1 ranking after winning two round-robin matches. Salisbury was also in contention for the top ranking.

For the first time since 2007, the top four seeded teams reached the semifinals.

== Seeds ==
1. (Croatia) Nikola Mektić / (Croatia) Mate Pavić (semifinals)
2. (United States) Rajeev Ram / (United Kingdom) Joe Salisbury (final)
3. (France) Pierre-Hugues Herbert / (France) Nicolas Mahut (champions)
4. (Spain) Marcel Granollers / (Argentina) Horacio Zeballos (semifinals)
5. (Colombia) Juan Sebastián Cabal / (Colombia) Robert Farah (round robin)
6. (Croatia) Ivan Dodig / (Slovakia) Filip Polášek (round robin)
7. (United Kingdom) Jamie Murray / (Brazil) Bruno Soares (round robin)
8. (Germany) Kevin Krawietz / (Romania) Horia Tecău (round robin)

== Alternates ==
1. (Italy) Simone Bolelli / (Argentina) Máximo González (Did not play)
2. (Germany) Tim Pütz / (New Zealand) Michael Venus (Did not play)

== Draw ==
=== Finals ===
Semifinals
4	(Spain) Marcel Granollers (Argentina) Horacio Zeballos	3	4
3	(France) Pierre-Hugues Herbert (France) Nicolas Mahut	6	6
2	(United States) Rajeev Ram (United Kingdom) Joe Salisbury	4	7^{7}	[10]
1	(Croatia) Nikola Mektić (Croatia) Mate Pavić	6	6^{3}	[4]

Final
3	(France) Pierre-Hugues Herbert (France) Nicolas Mahut	6	7^{7}
2	(United States) Rajeev Ram (United Kingdom) Joe Salisbury	4	6^{0}

=== Green group ===
		(Croatia) Mektić (Croatia) Pavić	(Spain) Granollers (Argentina) Zeballos	(Croatia) Dodig (Slovakia) Polášek	(Germany) Krawietz (Romania) Tecău	RR W–L	Set W–L	Game W–L	Standings
1	(Croatia) Nikola Mektić (Croatia) Mate Pavić		4–6, 6–7^{(4–7)}	6–4, 7–6^{(8–6)}	6–4, 6–4	2–1	4–2 (67%)	35–31 (53%)	2
4	(Spain) Marcel Granollers (Argentina) Horacio Zeballos	6–4, 7–6^{(7–4)}		4–6, 7–6^{(12–10)}, [10–6]	3–6, 7–6^{(7–1)}, [6–10]	2–1	5–3 (63%)	35–35 (50%)	1
6	(Croatia) Ivan Dodig (Slovakia) Filip Polášek	4–6, 6–7^{(6–8)}	6–4, 6–7^{(10–12)}, [6–10]		7–6^{(7–2)}, 7–5	1–2	3–4 (43%)	36–36 (50%)	3
8	(Germany) Kevin Krawietz (Romania) Horia Tecău	4–6, 4–6	6–3, 6–7^{(1–7)}, [10–6]	6–7^{(2–7)}, 5–7		1–2	2–5 (29%)	32–36 (47%)	4

=== Red group ===
		(United States) Ram (United Kingdom) Salisbury	(France) Herbert (France) Mahut	(Colombia) Cabal (Colombia) Farah	(United Kingdom) Murray (Brazil) Soares	RR W–L	Set W–L	Game W–L	Standings
2	(United States) Rajeev Ram (United Kingdom) Joe Salisbury		6–7^{(7–9)}, 6–0, [13–11]	7–5, 2–6, [11–9]	6–1, 7–6^{(7–5)}	3–0	6–2 (75%)	36–25 (59%)	1
3	(France) Pierre-Hugues Herbert (France) Nicolas Mahut	7–6^{(9–7)}, 0–6, [11–13]		7–6^{(7–1)}, 6–4	6–3, 7–6^{(7–5)}	2–1	5–2 (71%)	33–32 (51%)	2
5	(Colombia) Juan Sebastián Cabal (Colombia) Robert Farah	5–7, 6–2, [9–11]	6–7^{(1–7)}, 4–6		6–2, 6–4	1–2	3–4 (43%)	33–29 (53%)	3
7	(United Kingdom) Jamie Murray (Brazil) Bruno Soares	1–6, 6–7^{(5–7)}	3–6, 6–7^{(5–7)}	2–6, 4–6		0–3	0–6 (0%)	22–38 (37%)	4

Standings are determined by: 1. number of wins; 2. number of matches; 3. in two-teams-ties, head-to-head records; 4. in three-teams-ties, percentage of sets won, then percentage of games won; 5. ATP rankings.
