= 2021 ATP Finals – Singles =

2021 tennis tournament

Singles
- 2021 ATP Finals

Final
- Champion: (Germany) Alexander Zverev
- Runner-up: (Russia) Daniil Medvedev
- Score: 6–4, 6–4

Details
- Draw: 8 (round robin)

Events
Singles	Doubles
- ATP Finals

Alexander Zverev defeated defending champion Daniil Medvedev in the final, 6–4, 6–4 to win the singles tennis title at the 2021 ATP Finals. It was his second ATP Finals title. With the win, Zverev ended a six-year streak of different winners at the tournament, dating to 2015.

Hubert Hurkacz, Casper Ruud, Jannik Sinner (as an alternate replacing Matteo Berrettini) and Cameron Norrie (as an alternate replacing Stefanos Tsitsipas) made their tournament debuts. Sinner became the youngest player to win a Tour Finals match since Lleyton Hewitt in 2000. He was the youngest to compete since Juan Martín del Potro in 2008 and the first alternate to win a match since Janko Tipsarević in 2011.

Novak Djokovic was attempting to equal Roger Federer's record of six Tour Finals titles, but was defeated in the semifinals by Zverev.

== Seeds ==
1. (Serbia) Novak Djokovic (semifinals)
2. (Russia) Daniil Medvedev (final)
3. (Germany) Alexander Zverev (champion)
4. (Greece) Stefanos Tsitsipas (round robin, withdrew due to right elbow injury)
5. (Russia) Andrey Rublev (round robin)
6. (Italy) Matteo Berrettini (round robin, withdrew due to abdominal injury)
7. (Poland) Hubert Hurkacz (round robin)
8. (Norway) Casper Ruud (semifinals)

== Alternates ==
1. (Italy) Jannik Sinner (replaced Berrettini, round robin)
2. (United Kingdom) Cameron Norrie (replaced Tsitsipas, round robin)
3. (Russia) Aslan Karatsev (Did not play)

== Draw ==
=== Finals ===
Semifinals
1	(Serbia) Novak Djokovic	6^{4}	6	3
3	(Germany) Alexander Zverev	7^{7}	4	6
2	(Russia) Daniil Medvedev	6	6
8	(Norway) Casper Ruud	4	2

Final
3	(Germany) Alexander Zverev	6	6
2	(Russia) Daniil Medvedev	4	4

=== Green group ===
		(Serbia) Djokovic	(Greece) Tsitsipas (United Kingdom) Norrie	(Russia) Rublev	(Norway) Ruud	RR W–L	Set W–L	Game W–L	Standings
1	(Serbia) Novak Djokovic		6–2, 6–1 (w/ Norrie)	6–3, 6–2	7–6^{(7–4)}, 6–2	3–0	6–0 (100%)	37–16 (70%)	1
4; 10	(Greece) Stefanos Tsitsipas (United Kingdom) Cameron Norrie	2–6, 1–6 (w/ Norrie)		4–6, 4–6 (w/ Tsitsipas)	6–1, 3–6, 4–6 (w/ Norrie)	0–1; 0–2	0–2 (0%); 1–4 (20%)	8–12 (40%); 16–25 (39%)	X 4
5	(Russia) Andrey Rublev	3–6, 2–6	6–4, 6–4 (w/ Tsitsipas)		6–2, 5–7, 6–7^{(5–7)}	1–2	3–4 (43%)	34–36 (49%)	3
8	(Norway) Casper Ruud	6–7^{(4–7)}, 2–6	1–6, 6–3, 6–4 (w/ Norrie)	2–6, 7–5, 7–6^{(7–5)}		2–1	4–4 (50%)	37–43 (46%)	2

=== Red group ===
		(Russia) Medvedev	(Germany) Zverev	(Italy) Berrettini (Italy) Sinner	(Poland) Hurkacz	RR W–L	Set W–L	Game W–L	Standings
2	(Russia) Daniil Medvedev		6–3, 6–7^{(3–7)}, 7–6^{(8–6)}	6–0, 6–7^{(5–7)}, 7–6^{(10–8)} (w/ Sinner)	6–7^{(5–7)}, 6–3, 6–4	3–0	6–3 (67%)	56–43 (57%)	1
3	(Germany) Alexander Zverev	3–6, 7–6^{(7–3)}, 6–7^{(6–8)}		7–6^{(9–7)}, 1–0, ret. (w/ Berrettini)	6–2, 6–4	2–1	5–2 (71%)	36–31 (54%)	2
6; 9	(Italy) Matteo Berrettini (Italy) Jannik Sinner	0–6, 7–6^{(7–5)}, 6–7^{(8–10)} (w/ Sinner)	6–7^{(7–9)}, 0–1, ret. (w/ Berrettini)		6–2, 6–2 (w/ Sinner)	0–1; 1–1	0–2 (0%)^{†} 3–2 (60%)	0–0 (0%); 25–23 (52%)	X 3
7	(Poland) Hubert Hurkacz	7–6^{(7–5)}, 3–6, 4–6	2–6, 4–6	2–6, 2–6 (w/ Sinner)		0–3	1–6 (14%)	24–42 (36%)	4

† Following ATP rules, Berrettini's retirement against Zverev was counted as a straight-set loss in determining round robin standings.

Standings are determined by: 1. number of wins; 2. number of matches played; 3. in two-players-ties, head-to-head records; 4. in three-players-ties, percentage of sets won, then percentage of games won; 5. ATP rankings.
