= 2021 Halle Open – Singles =

Singles
- 2021 Halle Open

Final
- Champion: (France) Ugo Humbert
- Runner-up: (Russia) Andrey Rublev
- Score: 6–3, 7–6^{(7–4)}

Details
- Draw: 32 (6Q / 4WC)
- Seeds: 8

Events
Singles	Doubles
← 2019 ·	Halle Open	· 2022 →

Ugo Humbert defeated Andrey Rublev in the final 6–3, 7–6^{(7–4)}, to win the singles tennis title at the 2021 Halle Open. Humbert's win earned him his third career ATP Tour singles title and his first ATP 500 victory, and also made him the first French player to win the tournament since Henri Leconte won the inaugural edition in 1993. Both Humbert and Rublev were contesting their first career final on grass.

Roger Federer was the defending champion from when the event was last held in 2019, but he lost in the second round to Félix Auger-Aliassime.

== Seeds ==
1. (Russia) Daniil Medvedev (first round)
2. (Greece) Stefanos Tsitsipas (withdrew)
3. (Germany) Alexander Zverev (second round)
4. (Russia) Andrey Rublev (final)
5. (Switzerland) Roger Federer (second round)
6. (Spain) Roberto Bautista Agut (first round)
7. (Belgium) David Goffin (first round, retired)
8. (France) Gaël Monfils (first round)

== Draw ==
=== Key ===
- Q = Qualifier
- WC = Wild card
- LL = Lucky loser
- Alt = Alternate
- SE = Special exempt
- PR = Protected ranking
- ITF = ITF entry
- JE = Junior exempt
- w/o = Walkover
- r = Retired
- d = Defaulted
- SR = Special ranking

=== Finals ===
Semifinals
(Canada) Félix Auger-Aliassime	4	6	6^{5}
(France) Ugo Humbert	6	3	7^{7}
4	(Russia) Andrey Rublev	6	3	6
Q	(Georgia (country)) Nikoloz Basilashvili	1	6	3

Final
(France) Ugo Humbert	6	7^{7}
4	(Russia) Andrey Rublev	3	6^{4}

=== Top half ===
First round
1	(Russia) D Medvedev	6^{6}	3
(Germany) J-L Struff	7^{8}	6
(Canada) V Pospisil	6^{4}	6^{6}
Q	(United States) M Giron	7^{7}	7^{8}
(Canada) F Auger-Aliassime	6	7
(Poland) H Hurkacz	3	5
Q	(Belarus) I Ivashka	6^{4}	5
5	(Switzerland) R Federer	7^{7}	7
3	(Germany) A Zverev	6	3	6
(Germany) D Koepfer	4	6	3
(France) U Humbert	4	7^{7}	7^{7}
(United States) S Querrey	6	6^{4}	6^{5}
Q	(Lithuania) R Berankis	3	6	2
(Japan) K Nishikori	6	2	6
(United States) S Korda	6	7^{7}
6	(Spain) R Bautista Agut	3	6^{0}

Second round
(Germany) J-L Struff	7^{7}	3	4
Q	(United States) M Giron	6^{1}	6	6
(Canada) F Auger-Aliassime	4	6	6
5	(Switzerland) R Federer	6	3	2
3	(Germany) A Zverev	6^{4}	6	3
(France) U Humbert	7^{7}	3	6
(Japan) K Nishikori	6	3	5
(United States) S Korda	2	6	7

Quarterfinals
Q	(United States) M Giron	3	2
(Canada) F Auger-Aliassime	6	6
(France) U Humbert	6	6^{5}	6
(United States) S Korda	2	7^{7}	4

Semifinals
(Canada) F Auger-Aliassime	4	6	6^{5}
(France) U Humbert	6	3	7^{7}

=== Bottom half ===
First round
7	(Belgium) D Goffin	6	5	0^{r}
(France) C Moutet	1	7	0
SE	(Austria) J Rodionov	4	3
WC	(Germany) P Kohlschreiber	6	6
(Australia) J Thompson	6	7^{7}
WC	(Germany) D Altmaier	2	6^{4}
(Russia) K Khachanov	3	6^{5}
4	(Russia) A Rublev	6	7^{7}
8/WC	(France) G Monfils	4	4
(South Africa) L Harris	6	6
(Argentina) G Pella	7^{7}	5	1
Q	(Slovakia) L Lacko	6^{5}	7	6
Q	(Georgia (country)) N Basilashvili	6	3	6
(France) G Simon	1	6	4
Q	(France) A Rinderknech	7	6
LL	(Germany) Y Hanfmann	5	3

Second round
(France) C Moutet	4	6^{4}
WC	(Germany) P Kohlschreiber	6	7^{7}
(Australia) J Thompson	4	4
4	(Russia) A Rublev	6	6
(South Africa) L Harris	6	7^{10}
Q	(Slovakia) L Lacko	3	6^{8}
Q	(Georgia (country)) N Basilashvili	6	7
Q	(France) A Rinderknech	2	5

Quarterfinals
WC	(Germany) P Kohlschreiber	6^{4}	2
4	(Russia) A Rublev	7^{7}	6
(South Africa) L Harris	4	6^{5}
Q	(Georgia (country)) N Basilashvili	6	7^{7}

Semifinals
4	(Russia) A Rublev	6	3	6
Q	(Georgia (country)) N Basilashvili	1	6	3

== Qualifying ==
=== Seeds ===
1. (Georgia (country)) Nikoloz Basilashvili (qualified)
2. (Belarus) Egor Gerasimov (first round)
3. (United States) Marcos Giron (qualified)
4. (Moldova) Radu Albot (first round)
5. (Belarus) Ilya Ivashka (qualified)
6. (Lithuania) Ričardas Berankis (qualified)
7. (Germany) Yannick Hanfmann (qualifying competition, lucky loser)
8. (Australia) James Duckworth (qualifying competition)
9. (Colombia) Daniel Elahi Galán (qualifying competition)
10. (Austria) Dennis Novak (qualifying competition)
11. (Portugal) João Sousa (qualifying competition)
12. (France) Arthur Rinderknech (qualified)

=== Qualifiers ===
1. (Georgia (country)) Nikoloz Basilashvili
2. (Slovakia) Lukáš Lacko
3. (United States) Marcos Giron
4. (France) Arthur Rinderknech
5. (Belarus) Ilya Ivashka
6. (Lithuania) Ričardas Berankis

=== Lucky loser ===
1. (Germany) Yannick Hanfmann

=== Qualifying draw ===
==== First qualifier ====
First round
1	(Georgia (country)) Nikoloz Basilashvili	7^{9}	7^{7}
WC	(Germany) Rudolf Molleker	6^{7}	6^{5}
(France) Alexandre Müller	6	0	5
7	(Germany) Yannick Hanfmann	2	6	7

Qualifying competition
1	(Georgia (country)) Nikoloz Basilashvili	7^{7}	6
7	(Germany) Yannick Hanfmann	6^{3}	4

==== Second qualifier ====
First round
2	(Belarus) Egor Gerasimov	4	5
PR	(Slovakia) Lukáš Lacko	6	7
(France) Grégoire Barrère	6	6^{5}	4
11	(Portugal) João Sousa	3	7^{7}	6

Qualifying competition
PR	(Slovakia) Lukáš Lacko	4	6	6
11	(Portugal) João Sousa	6	4	3

==== Third qualifier ====
First round
3	(United States) Marcos Giron	6	7
WC	(Switzerland) Dominic Stricker	4	5
WC	(Spain) Nicola Kuhn	6^{2}	6	6^{4}
9	(Colombia) Daniel Elahi Galán	7^{7}	4	7^{7}

Qualifying competition
3	(United States) Marcos Giron	6	7^{7}
9	(Colombia) Daniel Elahi Galán	4	6^{5}

==== Fourth qualifier ====
First round
4	(Moldova) Radu Albot	6	3	5
(Australia) Christopher O'Connell	4	6	7
(Ukraine) Sergiy Stakhovsky	4	4
12	(France) Arthur Rinderknech	6	6

Qualifying competition
(Australia) Christopher O'Connell	6	4	2
12	(France) Arthur Rinderknech	3	6	6

==== Fifth qualifier ====
First round
5	(Belarus) Ilya Ivashka	6	6
PR	(Japan) Tatsuma Ito	1	3
(Latvia) Ernests Gulbis	7	5	2
8	(Australia) James Duckworth	5	7	6

Qualifying competition
5	(Belarus) Ilya Ivashka	2	6	6
8	(Australia) James Duckworth	6	4	0

==== Sixth qualifier ====
First round
6/Alt	(Lithuania) Ričardas Berankis	6	2
(Germany) Cedrik-Marcel Stebe	4	1^{r}
(Germany) Yannick Maden	4	0^{r}
10	(Austria) Dennis Novak	6	0

Qualifying competition
6/Alt	(Lithuania) Ričardas Berankis	6	6
10	(Austria) Dennis Novak	4	3
