= 2021 National Bank Open – Men's doubles =

Tennis tournament

Men's doubles
- 2021 National Bank Open

Final
- Champions: (United States) Rajeev Ram (United Kingdom) Joe Salisbury
- Runners-up: (Croatia) Nikola Mektić (Croatia) Mate Pavić
- Score: 6–3, 4–6, [10–3]

Details
- Draw: 28
- Seeds: 8

Events
Singles	men	women
Doubles	men	women
- National Bank Open

Marcel Granollers and Horacio Zeballos were the defending champions from when the tournament was last held in 2019, but withdrew before the tournament began.

Rajeev Ram and Joe Salisbury won the title, defeating Nikola Mektić and Mate Pavić in the final, 6–3, 4–6, [10–3]. By reaching the finals, the Croatian tandem became the second team since the Bryans in 2014, to reach 5 consecutive Masters 1000 finals.

== Seeds ==
The top four seeds receive a bye into the second round.

1. (Croatia) Nikola Mektić / (Croatia) Mate Pavić (final)
2. (Colombia) Juan Sebastián Cabal / (Colombia) Robert Farah (quarterfinals)
3. (United States) Rajeev Ram / (United Kingdom) Joe Salisbury (champions)
4. (Germany) Kevin Krawietz / (Romania) Horia Tecău (semifinals)
5. (Poland) Łukasz Kubot / (Brazil) Marcelo Melo (second round)
6. (Australia) John Peers / (Slovakia) Filip Polášek (first round)
7. (Germany) Tim Pütz / (New Zealand) Michael Venus (first round)
8. (India) Rohan Bopanna / (Croatia) Ivan Dodig (quarterfinals)

== Draw ==
Key

- Q = Qualifier
- WC = Wild card
- LL = Lucky loser
- Alt = Alternate
- ITF = ITF entry
- PR = Protected ranking
- SR = Special ranking
- SE = Special exempt
- JE = Junior exempt
- JR = Junior Accelerator Programme entrant
- CO = College Accelerator Programme entrant
- NG = Next Gen Accelerator Program entrant
- w/o = Walkover
- r = Retired
- d = Defaulted

=== Finals ===
Semifinals
1	(Croatia) Nikola Mektić (Croatia) Mate Pavić	7^{7}	7^{14}
4	(Germany) Kevin Krawietz (Romania) Horia Tecău	6^{3}	6^{12}
3	(United States) Rajeev Ram (United Kingdom) Joe Salisbury	6	7
(Belgium) Sander Gillé (Belgium) Joran Vliegen	3	5

Final
1	(Croatia) Nikola Mektić (Croatia) Mate Pavić	3	6	[3]
3	(United States) Rajeev Ram (United Kingdom) Joe Salisbury	6	4	[10]

=== Top half ===
First round
Alt	(Serbia) M Kecmanović (Norway) C Ruud	5	3
(United Kingdom) D Evans (United Kingdom) N Skupski	7	6
(United Kingdom) J Murray (Australia) M Purcell	7^{7}	1	[11]
(Netherlands) M Middelkoop (Australia) L Saville	6^{5}	6	[13]
(Kazakhstan) A Bublik (Chile) C Garín	6	6
6	(Australia) J Peers (Slovakia) F Polášek	4	4
(Uruguay) A Behar (Ecuador) G Escobar	7	3	[11]
(Austria) O Marach (Austria) P Oswald	5	6	[13]
(Australia) A de Minaur (United Kingdom) C Norrie	4	7^{7}	[8]
(Russia) A Karatsev (Serbia) D Lajović	6	6^{4}	[10]
(Poland) H Hurkacz (Italy) J Sinner	5	4
5	(Poland) Ł Kubot (Brazil) M Melo	7	6

Second round
1	(Croatia) N Mektić (Croatia) M Pavić	3	7	[13]
(United Kingdom) D Evans (United Kingdom) N Skupski	6	5	[11]
(Netherlands) M Middelkoop (Australia) L Saville	6	1
(Kazakhstan) A Bublik (Chile) C Garín	3	0^{r}
4	(Germany) K Krawietz (Romania) H Tecău	6	1	[12]
(Austria) O Marach (Austria) P Oswald	2	6	[10]
(Russia) A Karatsev (Serbia) D Lajović	6	6
5	(Poland) Ł Kubot (Brazil) M Melo	4	4

Quarterfinals
1	(Croatia) N Mektić (Croatia) M Pavić	6	6^{6}	[10]
(Netherlands) M Middelkoop (Australia) L Saville	3	7^{8}	[7]
4	(Germany) K Krawietz (Romania) H Tecău	6	3	[10]
(Russia) A Karatsev (Serbia) D Lajović	3	6	[3]

Semifinals
1	(Croatia) N Mektić (Croatia) M Pavić	7^{7}	7^{14}
4	(Germany) K Krawietz (Romania) H Tecău	6^{3}	6^{12}

=== Bottom half ===
First round
8	(India) R Bopanna (Croatia) I Dodig	6	7^{7}
(Italy) F Fognini (Italy) L Sonego	4	6^{4}
WC	(Canada) P Polansky (Canada) B Schnur	4	1
(Italy) S Bolelli (Argentina) M González	6	6
(Croatia) M Čilić (Germany) J-L Struff	4	7	[11]
(Kazakhstan) A Golubev (Germany) A Mies	6	5	[13]
7	(Germany) T Pütz (New Zealand) M Venus	5	6^{3}
(Belgium) S Gillé (Belgium) J Vliegen	7	7^{7}
(South Africa) R Klaasen (Japan) B McLachlan	4	6^{4}
(Netherlands) W Koolhof (United States) A Krajicek	6	7^{7}
(Russia) K Khachanov (Russia) A Rublev	6	7^{8}
WC	(Canada) F Auger-Aliassime (Canada) A Galarneau	4	6^{6}

Second round
8	(India) R Bopanna (Croatia) I Dodig	6	6
(Italy) S Bolelli (Argentina) M González	4	3
(Kazakhstan) A Golubev (Germany) A Mies	3	2
3	(United States) R Ram (United Kingdom) J Salisbury	6	6
(Belgium) S Gillé (Belgium) J Vliegen	7^{7}	2	[10]
(Netherlands) W Koolhof (United States) A Krajicek	6^{5}	6	[8]
(Russia) K Khachanov (Russia) A Rublev	3	4
2	(Colombia) JS Cabal (Colombia) R Farah	6	6

Quarterfinals
8	(India) R Bopanna (Croatia) I Dodig	6	3	[4]
3	(United States) R Ram (United Kingdom) J Salisbury	4	6	[10]
(Belgium) S Gillé (Belgium) J Vliegen	6^{5}	6	[10]
2	(Colombia) JS Cabal (Colombia) R Farah	7^{7}	2	[8]

Semifinals
3	(United States) R Ram (United Kingdom) J Salisbury	6	7
(Belgium) S Gillé (Belgium) J Vliegen	3	5
