= 2021 Abierto Mexicano Telcel – Doubles =

Doubles
- 2021 Abierto Mexicano Telcel

Final
- Champion: (United Kingdom) Ken Skupski (United Kingdom) Neal Skupski
- Runner-up: (Spain) Marcel Granollers (Argentina) Horacio Zeballos
- Score: 7–6^{(7–3)}, 6–4

Events
Singles	Doubles
- Abierto Mexicano Telcel

Łukasz Kubot and Marcelo Melo were the defending champions, but they decided to participate in Dubai instead.

Ken and Neal Skupski won the title, defeating Marcel Granollers and Horacio Zeballos in the final, 7–6^{(7–3)}, 6–4.

== Seeds ==
1. (Spain) Marcel Granollers / (Argentina) Horacio Zeballos (final)
2. (United Kingdom) Jamie Murray / (Brazil) Bruno Soares (quarterfinals)
3. (France) Pierre-Hugues Herbert / (France) Nicolas Mahut (semifinals)
4. (United States) Rajeev Ram / (United Kingdom) Joe Salisbury (semifinals)

== Draw ==
Key

- Q = Qualifier
- WC = Wild card
- LL = Lucky loser
- Alt = Alternate
- ITF = ITF entry
- PR = Protected ranking
- SR = Special ranking
- SE = Special exempt
- JE = Junior exempt
- JR = Junior Accelerator Programme entrant
- CO = College Accelerator Programme entrant
- NG = Next Gen Accelerator Program entrant
- w/o = Walkover
- r = Retired
- d = Defaulted

=== Draw ===
First round
1	(Spain) M Granollers (Argentina) H Zeballos	6	6
(Croatia) M Čilić (Austria) O Marach	2	3
WC	(Germany) A Zverev (Germany) M Zverev	2	5
Q	(Australia) L Saville (Australia) J-P Smith	6	7
3	(France) P-H Herbert (France) N Mahut	6	6
(South Africa) R Klaasen (Japan) B McLachlan	4	4
(United States) A Krajicek (Croatia) F Škugor	6	3	[6]
(Serbia) L Đere (France) B Paire	2	6	[10]
WC	(Brazil) M Demoliner (Mexico) S González	7	4	[10]
LL	(Germany) D Koepfer (New Zealand) A Sitak	5	6	[8]
(Bulgaria) G Dimitrov (United States) T Paul	4	6	[8]
4	(United States) R Ram (United Kingdom) J Salisbury	6	3	[10]
(Argentina) D Schwartzman (Portugal) J Sousa	4	6^{7}
(United Kingdom) K Skupski (United Kingdom) N Skupski	6	7^{9}
(India) R Bopanna (Pakistan) A-u-H Qureshi	7^{7}	2	[1]
2	(United Kingdom) J Murray (Brazil) B Soares	6^{4}	6	[10]

Quarterfinals
1	(Spain) M Granollers (Argentina) H Zeballos	5	6	[10]
Q	(Australia) L Saville (Australia) J-P Smith	7	2	[8]
3	(France) P-H Herbert (France) N Mahut	6	6
(Serbia) L Đere (France) B Paire	4	1
WC	(Brazil) M Demoliner (Mexico) S González	6	3	[7]
4	(United States) R Ram (United Kingdom) J Salisbury	4	6	[10]
(United Kingdom) K Skupski (United Kingdom) N Skupski	6	3	[12]
2	(United Kingdom) J Murray (Brazil) B Soares	3	6	[10]

Semifinals
1	(Spain) M Granollers (Argentina) H Zeballos	6	7^{8}
3	(France) P-H Herbert (France) N Mahut	3	6^{6}
4	(United States) R Ram (United Kingdom) J Salisbury	4	6^{5}
(United Kingdom) K Skupski (United Kingdom) N Skupski	6	7^{7}

Final
1	(Spain) M Granollers (Argentina) H Zeballos	6^{3}	4
(United Kingdom) K Skupski (United Kingdom) N Skupski	7^{7}	6

== Qualifying ==
=== Seeds ===
1. (Australia) Luke Saville / (Australia) John-Patrick Smith (qualified)
2. (Germany) Dominik Koepfer / (New Zealand) Artem Sitak (qualifying competition, lucky losers)

=== Qualifiers ===
1. (Australia) Luke Saville / (Australia) John-Patrick Smith

=== Lucky losers ===
1. (Germany) Dominik Koepfer / (New Zealand) Artem Sitak

=== Qualifying draw ===
First round
1	(Australia) Luke Saville (Australia) John-Patrick Smith	6	1	[10]
(United States) Steve Johnson (United States) Tennys Sandgren	4	6	[6]
WC	(Mexico) Gerardo López Villaseñor (Mexico) Luis Patiño	4	7^{12}	[3]
2	(Germany) Dominik Koepfer (New Zealand) Artem Sitak	6	6^{10}	[10]

Qualifying competition
1	(Australia) Luke Saville (Australia) John-Patrick Smith	6	6
2	(Germany) Dominik Koepfer (New Zealand) Artem Sitak	3	2
