= 2021 WTA Finals =

- Date: 10–17 November
- Edition: 50th (singles) / 45th (doubles)
- Draw: 8S / 8D
- Prize money: $5,000,000
- Surface: Hard / outdoor
- Location: Zapopan, Mexico
- Venue: Panamerican Tennis Center

Champions

Singles
- (Spain) Garbiñe Muguruza

Doubles
- (Czech Republic) Barbora Krejčíková / (Czech Republic) Kateřina Siniaková
- WTA Finals

The 2021 WTA Finals, also known by its sponsored name Akron WTA Finals Guadalajara, was the women's year-end championship tennis tournament run by the Women's Tennis Association (WTA) as part of the 2021 WTA Tour. It took place at the Panamerican Tennis Center in Zapopan, Mexico from 10–17 November 2021.

== Champions ==
=== Singles ===
- (Spain) Garbiñe Muguruza def. (Estonia) Anett Kontaveit, 6–3, 7–5

=== Doubles ===
- (Czech Republic) Barbora Krejčíková / (Czech Republic) Kateřina Siniaková def. (Chinese Taipei) Hsieh Su-wei / (Belgium) Elise Mertens, 6–3, 6–4

== Tournament ==
Following the cancellation of the 2020 WTA Finals, the tournament was originally scheduled to take place at the Shenzhen Bay Sports Center in Shenzhen, China. Due to travel restrictions owing to the COVID-19 pandemic in mainland China, it was announced on September 13, 2021 that the tournament would move to Guadalajara for the year. This was the first time Mexico would host the WTA Finals. The tournament was the 50th edition of the singles event and the 45th of the doubles competition. It was contested by eight singles players and eight doubles teams.

=== Qualifying ===
In the singles, point totals are calculated by combining points from sixteen tournaments (excluding ITF and WTA 125 tournaments). Of these sixteen tournaments, a player's results from the four Grand Slam events, the four WTA 1000 tournaments with 1,000 points for the winner, and (for the players who played the main draw least two such tournaments) the best results from two WTA 1000 tournaments with 900 points maximum must be included.

In the doubles, point totals are calculated by any combination of eleven tournaments throughout the year. Unlike in the singles, this combination does not need to include results from the Grand Slam or Premier-level tournaments.

=== Format ===
Both the singles and doubles event features eight players/teams in a round robin event, split into two groups of four. Over the first four days of competition, each player/team meets the other three players/teams in her group, with the top two in each group advancing to the semifinals. The first-placed player/team in one group meets the second-placed player/team in the other group, and vice versa. The winners of each semifinal meet in the championship match.

==== Round robin tie-breaking methods ====
The final standings are made using these methods:

1. Greatest number of [match] wins.
2. Greatest number of matches played.
3. Head-to-head results if only two players are tied, or if three players are tied then:

a. If three players each have the same number of wins, a player having played less than all three matches is automatically eliminated and the player advancing to the single elimination competition is the winner of the match-up of the two remaining tied players.
b. Highest percentage of sets won.
c. Highest percentage of games won.

== Prize money and points ==
The total prize money for the 2021 WTA Finals is US$5,000,000. The tables below are based on the updated draw sheet information.

Stage	Prize money		Points
Stage	Singles	Doubles^{2}	Points
Champion	RR^{1} + $1,240,000	RR^{1} + $250,000	RR + 750
Runner-up	RR + $420,000	RR + $80,000	RR + 330
Semifinalist	RR + $30,000	RR + $0	RR
Round robin win per match	+$110,000	+$20,000	250
Round robin loss per match	—N/a	—N/a	125
Participation fee	3 matches = $110,000; 2 matches = $90,000; 1 match = $70,000	3 matches = $50,000; 2 matches = $40,000; 1 match = $30,000	—N/a
Alternates	2 matches = $80,000; 1 match = $60,000; 0 matches = $40,000	2 matches = $ 1 match = $ 0 matches = $	—N/a
^{1} RR means prize money or points won in the round robin round.

* ^{2} Prize money for doubles is per team.

* An undefeated champion would earn the maximum 1,500 points, and $1,680,000 in singles or $360,000 in doubles.

== Qualified players ==
=== Singles ===
#	Player	Points	Date qualified
–	(Australia) Ashleigh Barty	6,411	withdrew
1	(Belarus) Aryna Sabalenka	4,768	20 September
2	(Czech Republic) Barbora Krejčíková	4,518	20 September
3	(Czech Republic) Karolína Plíšková	4,036	4 October
4	(Greece) Maria Sakkari	3,341	21 October
5	(Poland) Iga Świątek	3,226	25 October
6	(Spain) Garbiñe Muguruza	3,195	25 October
7	(Spain) Paula Badosa	3,112	25 October
8	(Estonia) Anett Kontaveit	3,096	31 October

Ashleigh Barty, Aryna Sabalenka and Barbora Krejčíková were announced as the first three qualifiers on September 20.

Ashleigh Barty began 2021 by defeating Garbiñe Muguruza in the final of the Yarra Valley Classic, the Australian's first tour event in 11 months. After a defeat by Karolína Muchová in the quarterfinals of the Australian Open, Barty defended her title at the Miami Open, won Stuttgart, and reached the final in Madrid, losing only to Aryna Sabalenka and Paula Badosa during that time.

Injury forced her to retire from matches at Rome and the French Open, but Barty rebounded by winning Wimbledon, defeating Karolína Plíšková in the final. Barty suffered a shock first-round exit at the Olympics, then won the title in Cincinnati. At the US Open, Barty lost to Shelby Rogers in the third round after serving for the match twice.

On October 23, Barty withdrew from the WTA Finals, citing the toll of spending eight consecutive months away from home.

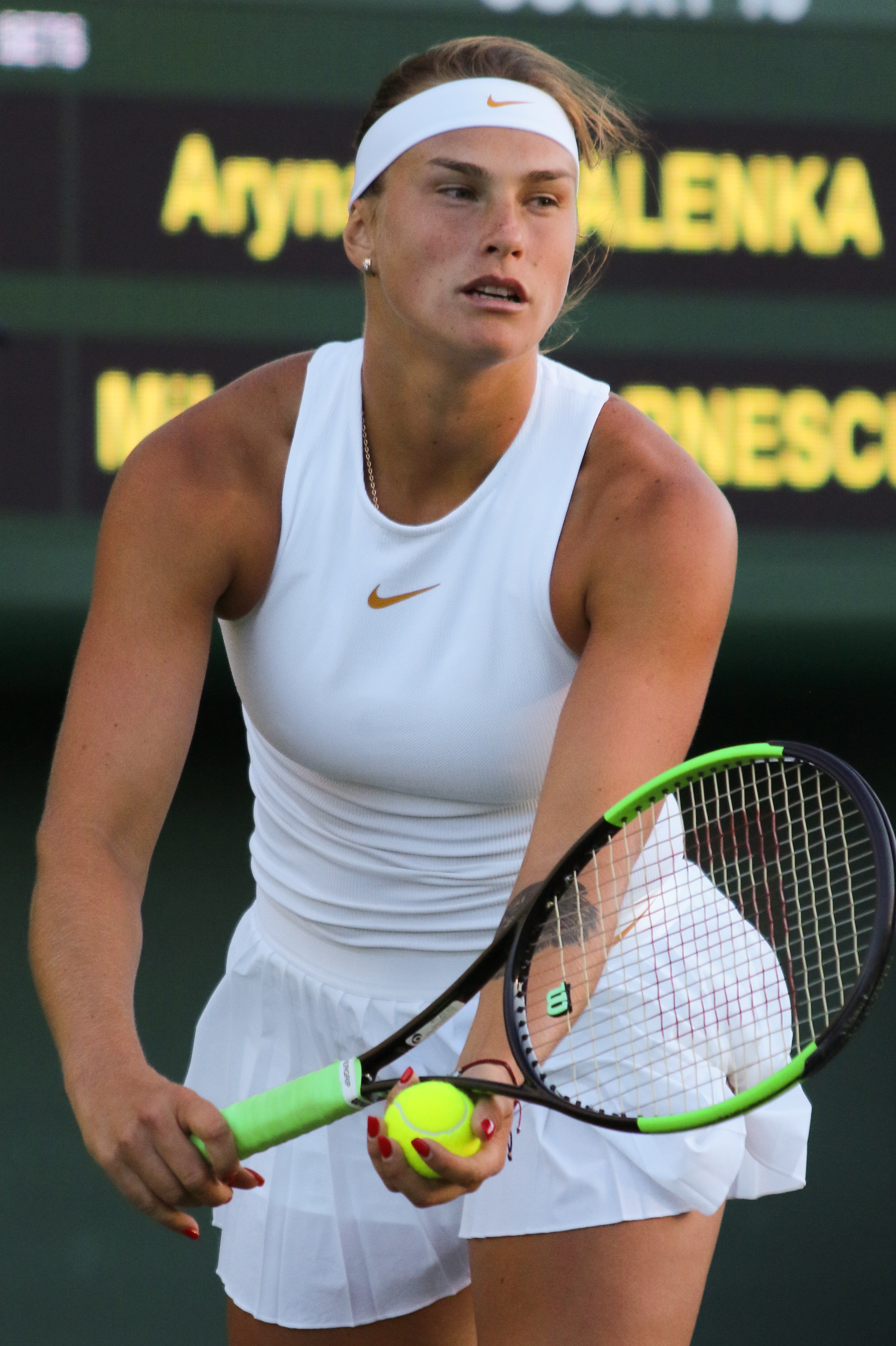
Aryna Sabalenka qualified at the WTA Finals for the first time in singles.

Aryna Sabalenka carried her dominant form from the end of 2020 into the start of 2021, winning the first tournament of the year in Abu Dhabi. A string of three-set losses followed: to Serena Williams in the Australian Open fourth round, to Muguruza in Doha and Dubai, and to Barty in Miami and the final of Stuttgart. Sabalenka avenged the losses to Barty in the final of Madrid to claim the biggest title of her career. Sabalenka was upset in the third round of the French Open by eventual finalist Anastasia Pavlyuchenkova. She reached her first Grand Slam semifinal at Wimbledon, losing in three sets to Plíšková. Sabalenka lost in the second round of the Olympics, then reached the semifinals at Montréal, falling again to Plíšková. Sabalenka reached another semifinal at the US Open, but lost to Leylah Fernandez.

After arriving in Indian Wells, Sabalenka tested positive for COVID-19 and was forced to withdraw. She accepted a wild card to play in Moscow and suffered only her second straight set loss of the season in the quarterfinals. Sabalenka was making her WTA Finals debut.

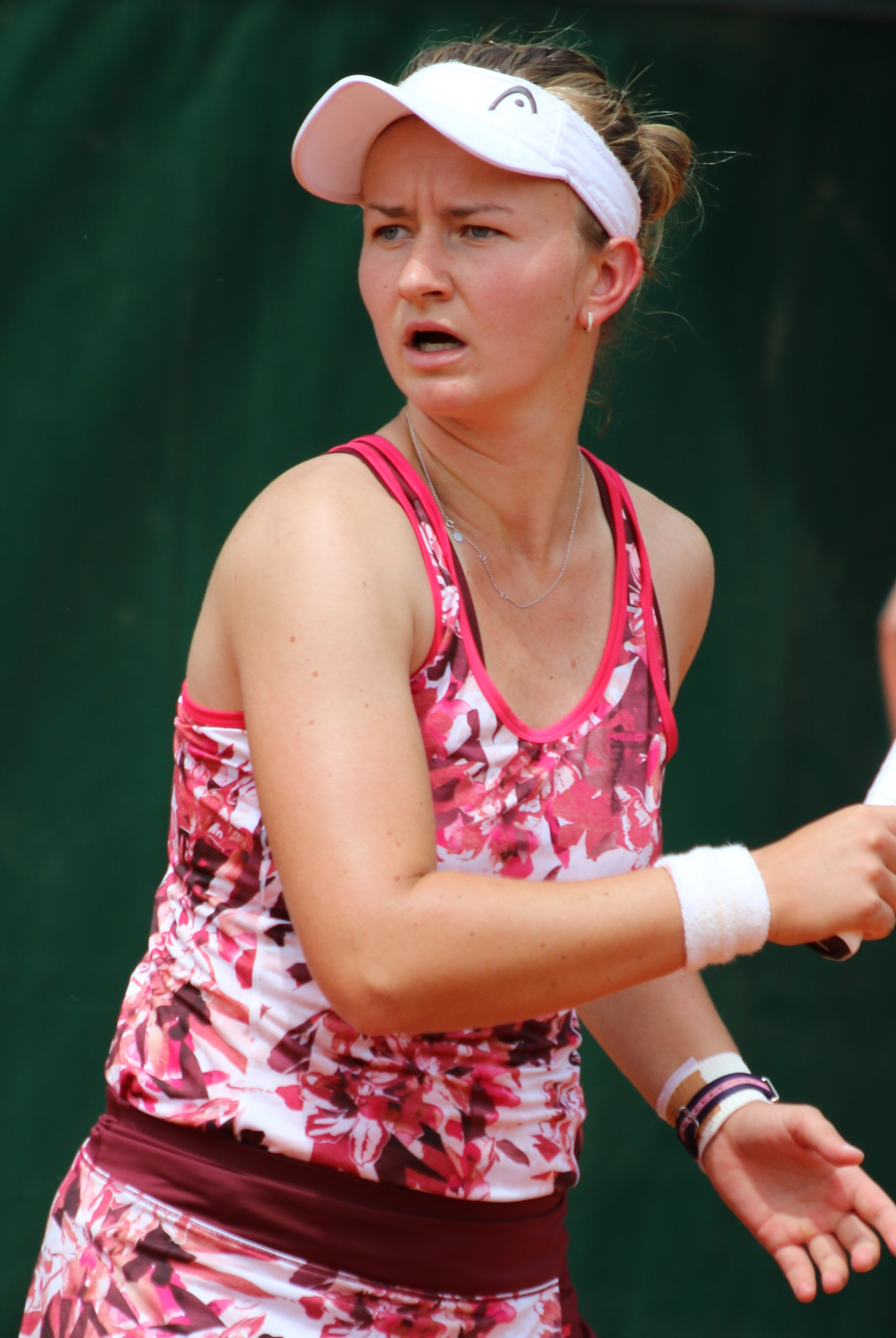
Barbora Krejčíková won the French Open.

Barbora Krejčíková lost in the second round of her first four tournaments of 2021. In Dubai, she reached the final without dropping a set and lost to Muguruza. After a first round loss to Paula Badosa in Madrid, Krejcikova held match points against Iga Świątek in Rome. She did not lose a match for the next eight weeks, winning her first WTA title in Strasbourg and her first singles Grand Slam at the French Open. At the French Open, Krejčíková saved match points against Maria Sakkari in the semifinals, and defeated Anastasia Pavlyuchenkova in three sets in the final. Barty snapped her winning streak in the fourth round of Wimbledon, but the Czech captured her third title of the year in Prague. After a third round loss at the Olympics, Krejčíková notched two victories over Muguruza en route to quarterfinals at Cincinnati and the US Open. Krejčíková was expected to represent the Czech Republic at the Billie Jean King Cup in Prague before making her singles debut at the WTA Finals.

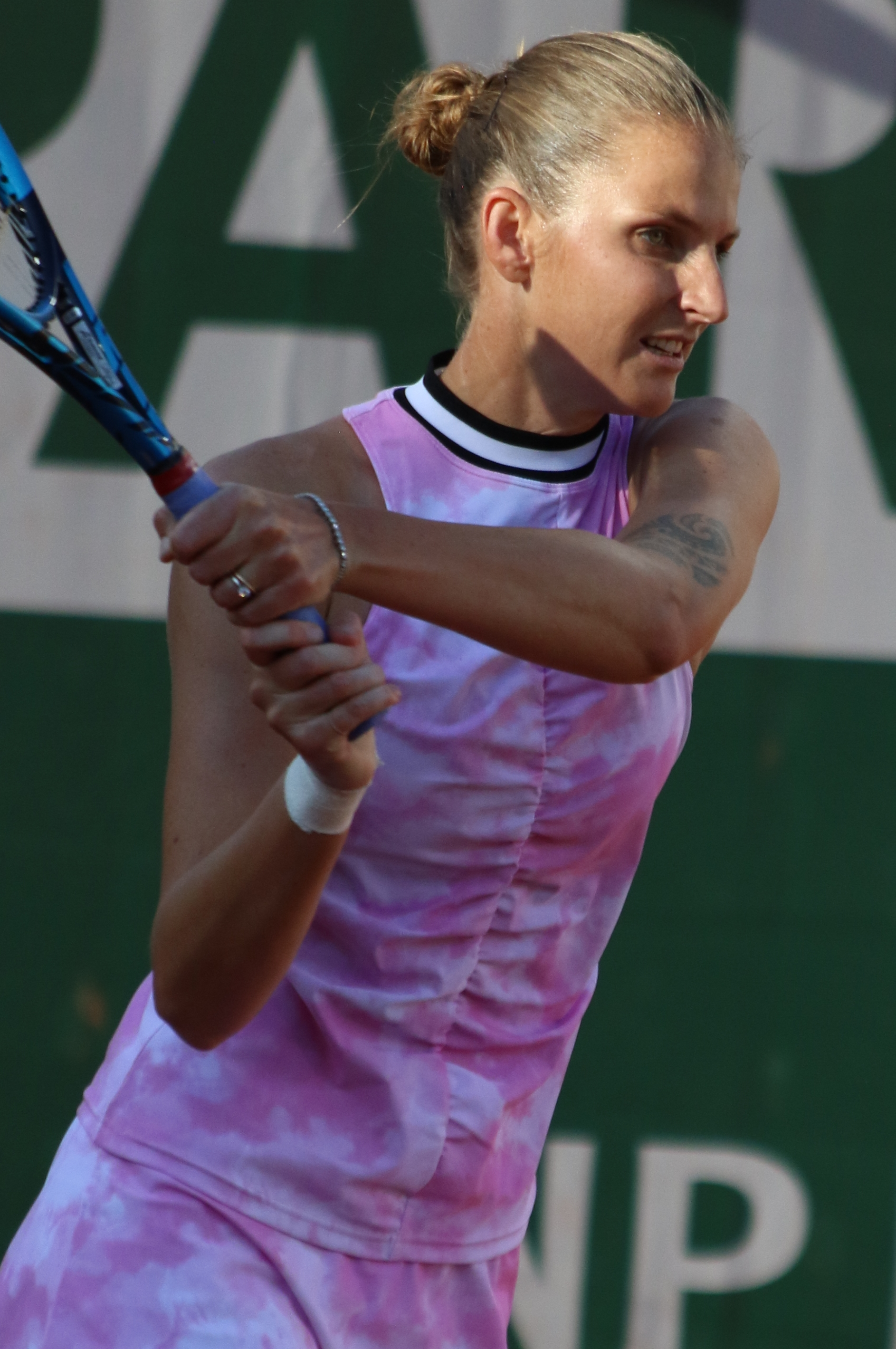
Karolína Plíšková reached the final of the Wimbledon Championships.

Karolína Plíšková was announced as the fourth qualifier on October 4. She had a nightmare start to the year, losing to Karolína Muchová in the third round of the Australian after blowing a 5–0 lead in the second set. Jessica Pegula eliminated her in the early rounds of Doha, Dubai, and Miami. She served for the match against Barty in Stuttgart, but lost in three sets. Plíšková made the final of Rome but lost to Iga Świątek, 6–0 6–0. She lost to Sloane Stephens in the second round of the French Open and failed to defend her title in Eastbourne. Entering Wimbledon outside the top 10 for the first time since 2016, Plíšková made the final with a comeback win over Sabalenka in the semifinals. In the championship match, Plíšková lost to Ashleigh Barty in three sets. After losing to Camila Giorgi in the second round of the Olympics, Plíšková made the final of Montréal (losing again to Giorgi), the semifinals of Cincinnati, and the quarterfinals of the US Open (falling to Maria Sakkari). She lost in the third round of Indian Wells to Beatriz Haddad Maia. Plíšková was making her fifth consecutive singles appearance at the WTA Finals.

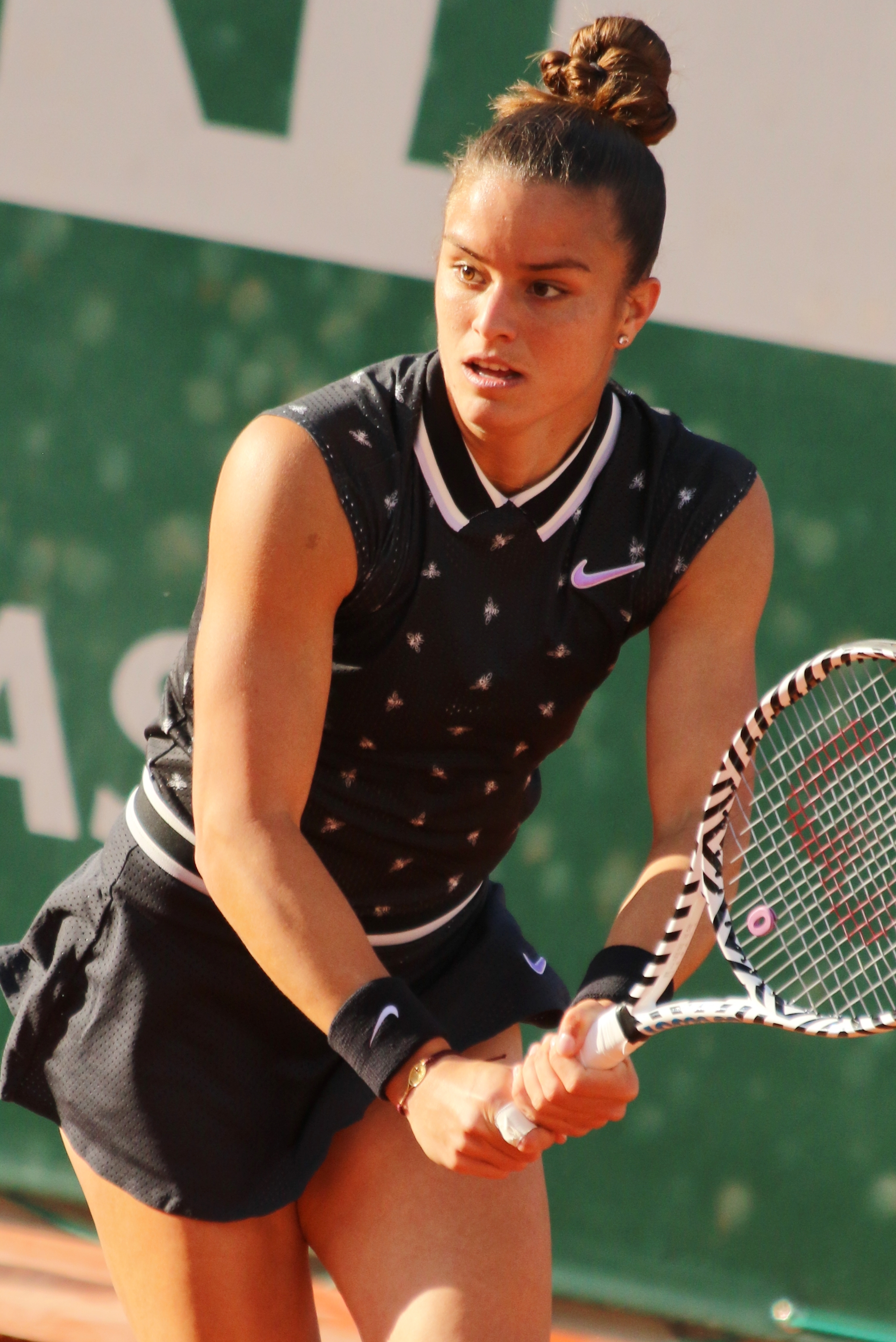
Maria Sakkari qualified for the first time at the WTA Finals.

On October 21, Maria Sakkari was announced as the fifth qualifier. She was the first Greek player to qualify for the WTA Finals. She had a very strong start to the season, reaching consecutive semifinals in Abu Dhabi and Melbourne's Grampians Trophy. A first round loss at the Australian Open was followed by a quarterfinal appearance in Doha. In Miami, she ended Naomi Osaka's 23 match-winning streak en route to the semifinal. An average clay season culminated into a run to her first ever grand slam semifinal at the French Open, where she lost 7–9 in the third set to the eventual champion Krejčíková, despite having a match point. Prior to that defeat, she had already eliminated Sofia Kenin and Iga Świątek, both of whom contested the 2020 French Open final. She lost in the second round of Wimbledon to Shelby Rogers. At the US Open, Sakkari defeated Petra Kvitová, Bianca Andreescu, and Karolína Plíšková to reach her second career grand slam semifinal, where she lost to the eventual champion, Emma Raducanu. During the European indoor hardcourt fall season, she reached the final in Ostrava, losing to Anett Kontaveit and semifinal in Moscow, where she retired against Ekaterina Alexandrova.

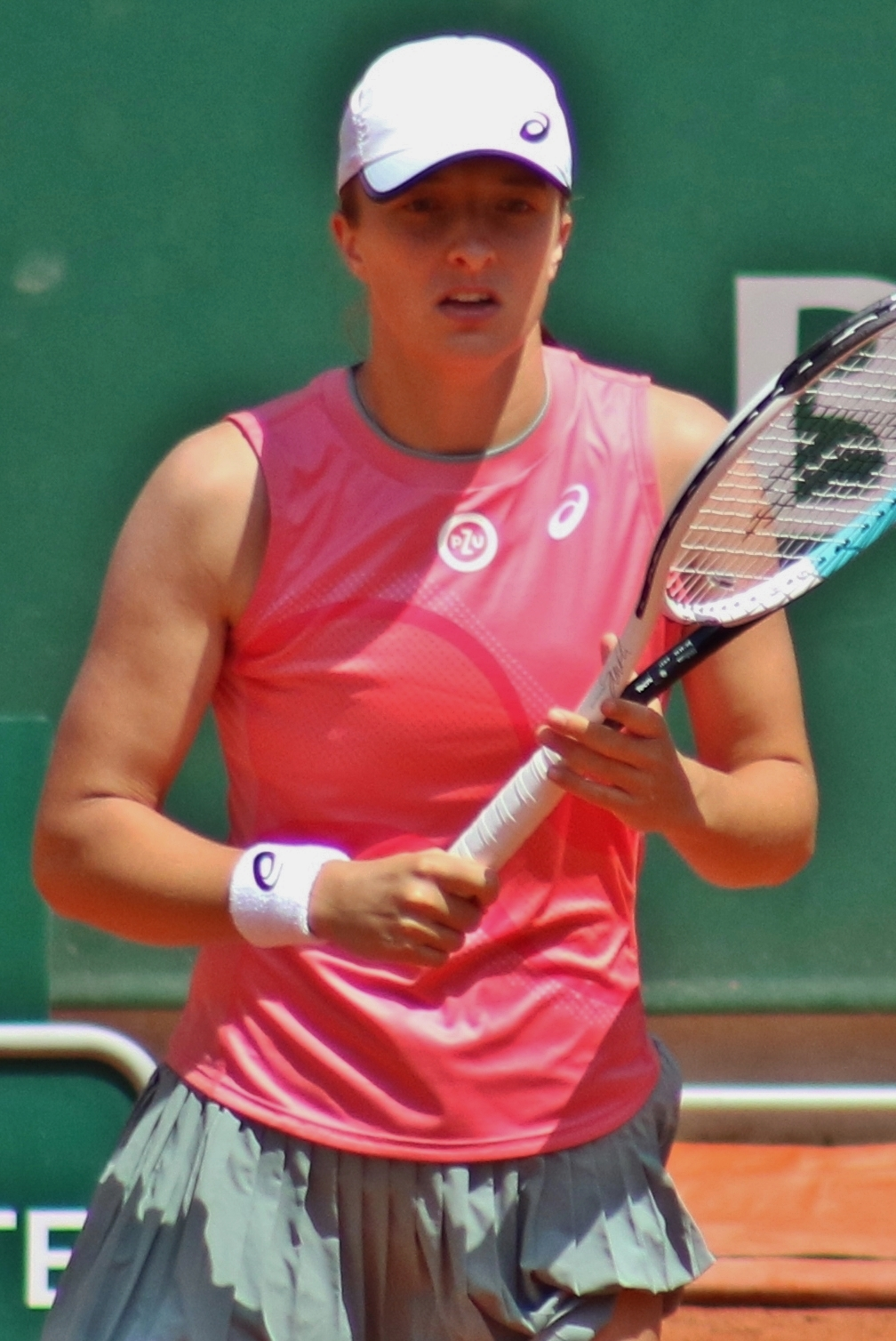
Iga Świątek became the first player born in the 21st century to qualify at the WTA Finals.

On October 25, Iga Świątek, Garbiñe Muguruza, and Paula Badosa were announced as the next three qualifiers.

Iga Świątek was the first player born in the 21st century to qualify for the WTA Finals on October 25. She was the only player this year to have reached the second week of all four grand slam tournaments, although she lost in the fourth round of three of those four majors. Only at the French Open did she reach the quarterfinals, where her title defense was ended by Sakkari. Among the WTA events, she won her second career title in Adelaide in February, defeating Belinda Bencic in the final. After three straight third round losses in Dubai, Miami and Madrid, Świątek won her third WTA singles title in Rome, defeating former champions Elina Svitolina and Plíšková en route to the title. At the Olympics, she suffered a second round defeat at the hands of Paula Badosa. During the fall season, she made the semifinal in Ostrava, losing to Sakkari again, and also losing in the fourth round at Indian Wells to Jeļena Ostapenko in a battle between two former Roland Garros champions.

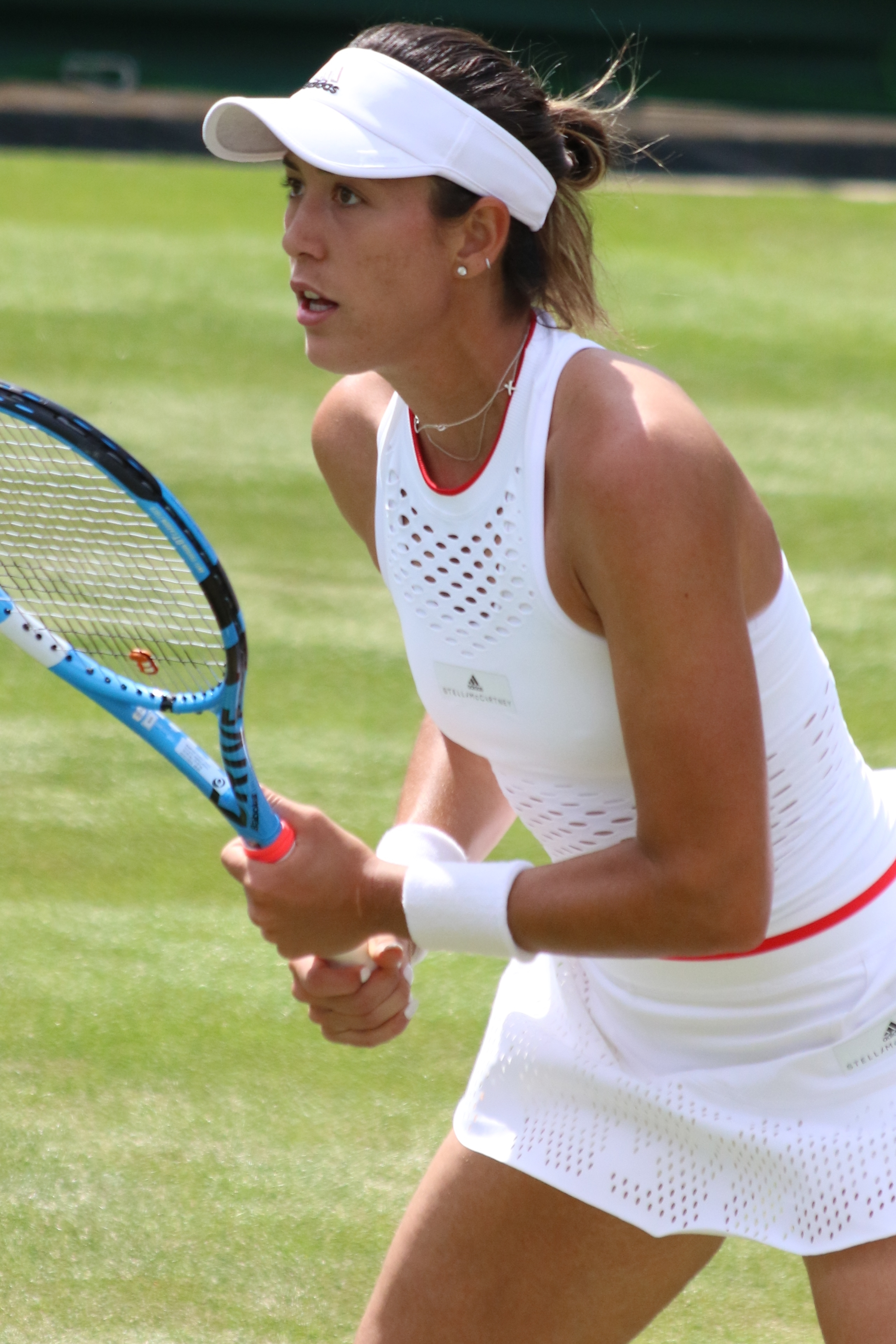
Garbiñe Muguruza qualified at the WTA Finals for the fourth time.

Garbiñe Muguruza qualified for the WTA Finals for the fourth time in her career. She reached the final in just her second event of the season, at Melbourne's Yarra Valley Classic, losing to Barty in the title match. At the Australian Open, she was leading 5-3 in the final set of her fourth round match against the eventual champion, Naomi Osaka, before losing four games in a row, and the match. She continued her strong run during the Gulf swing, reaching the final in Doha, where she lost to Petra Kvitová. She won her eighth career title in Dubai, defeating Krejčíková in the final. In Miami, she lost in the third round to Bianca Andreescu. In Charleston, she suffered an injury during her third round match against Yulia Putintseva which derailed her clay season, as she was forced to withdraw from her home event in Madrid. She lost in the third and first round of Rome and Roland Garros respectively. A quarterfinal appearance in Berlin on grass was followed by a third round loss to Ons Jabeur at Wimbledon. She also lost in the first round in Montréal to Kateřina Siniaková, and the third round and fourth round of Cincinnati and US Open respectively, to Krejčíková on both occasions. She won her ninth WTA title in Chicago, defeating Jabeur in the final before losing her opening match in Indian Wells. In Moscow, she reached the quarterfinals, losing to Anett Kontaveit.

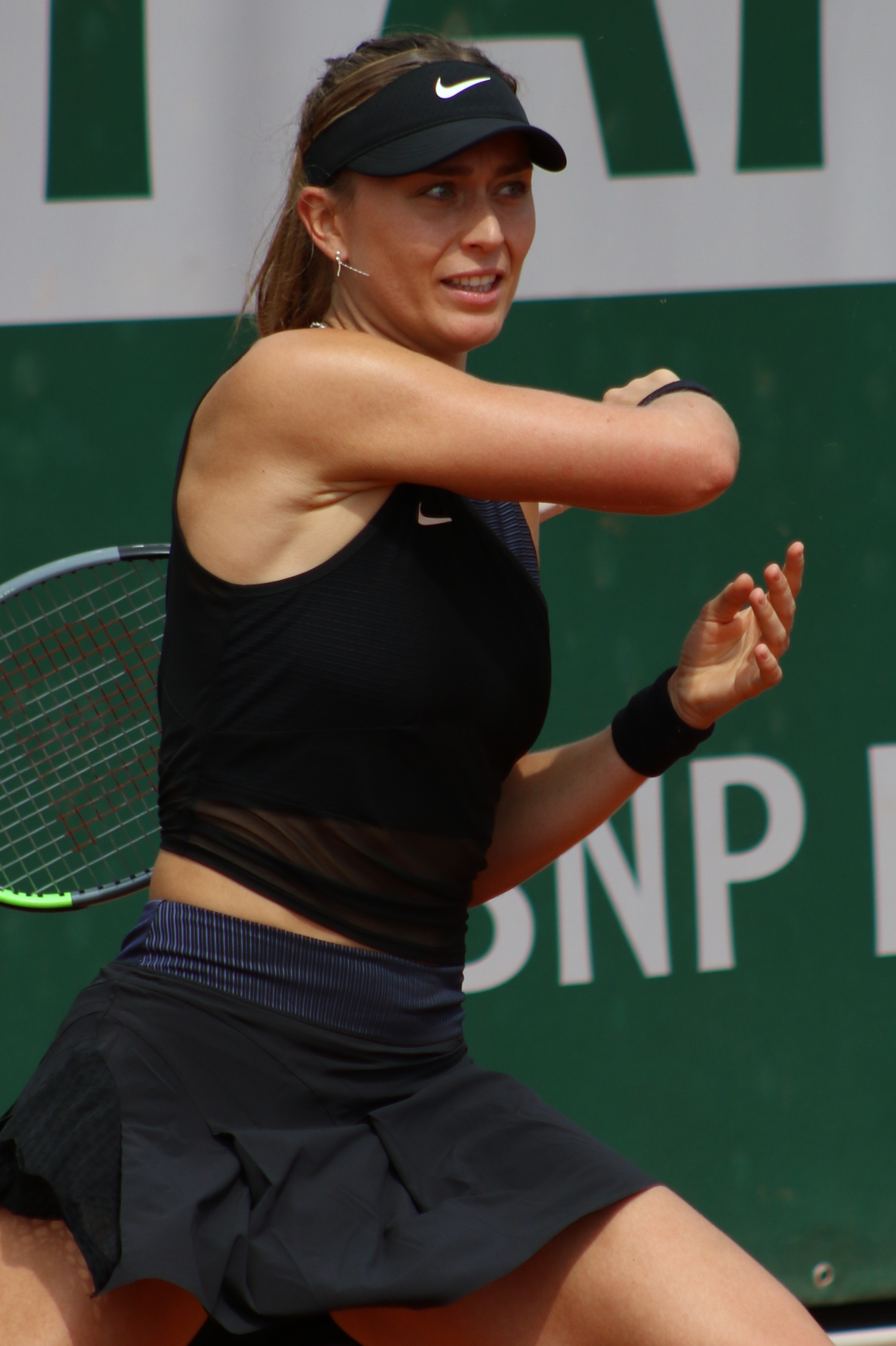
Paola Badosa qualified at the WTA Finals for the first time.

Paula Badosa qualified for the WTA Finals for the first time in her career. After a third round defeat in Abu Dhabi and first round loss at the Australian Open, she reached her first semifinal of the season in Lyon, losing to eventual champion Clara Tauson. After suffering some hiccups in St. Petersburg and Miami, Badosa went on a tear during the clay season, defeating Belinda Bencic and World No. 1, Barty to reach the semifinals in Charleston, losing to eventual champion Veronika Kudermetova. She defeated Krejčíková and Bencic again en route to her first ever WTA 1000 semifinal in Madrid, becoming the first home player to reach the semifinal stage of the tournament. She won her first career WTA singles title in Belgrade, without dropping a set. At the French Open, she reached her first grand slam quarterfinal, losing to Tamara Zidanšek 6–8 in the third set. She made the fourth round at Wimbledon, losing to Karolína Muchová. She reached the quarterfinals at both the Tokyo Olympics, where she had to retire due to heatstroke, and Cincinnati, where she also retired due to shoulder pain. That made Badosa arrive at the US Open not 100% fit, suffering a shocking second round defeat to Varvara Gracheva. Following a second round loss in Ostrava, Badosa won the second and the biggest title of her career in Indian Wells, with wins over Dayana Yastremska, Coco Gauff, Krejćíková, Angelique Kerber, Ons Jabeur and Victoria Azarenka along the way. She also became the first Spanish woman to win that tournament.

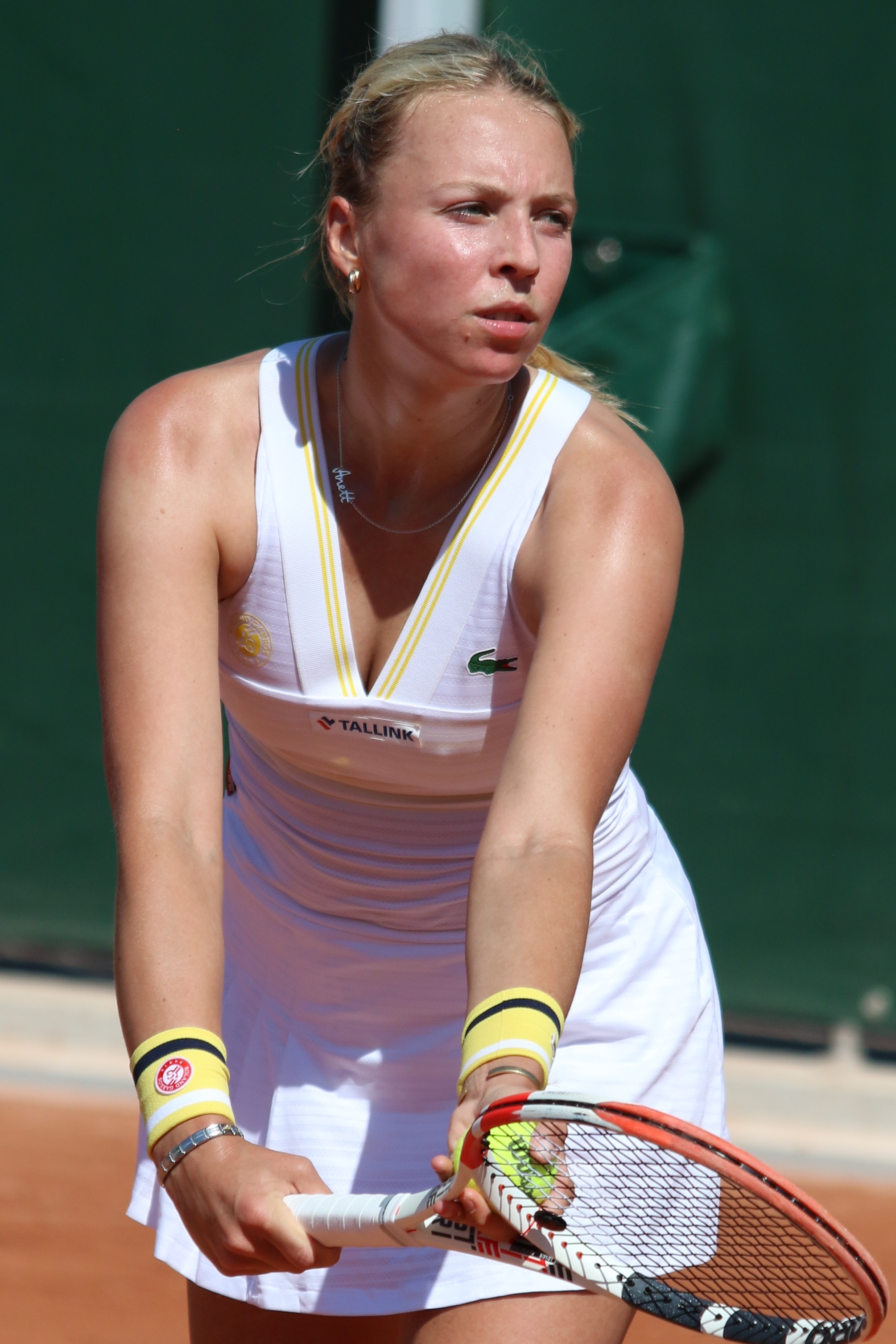
Anett Kontaveit claimed four titles in the year to qualify for the first time at the WTA Finals.

On October 31, Anett Kontaveit was announced as the final qualifier on 31 October, after winning the title in Cluj-Napoca.

Anett Kontaveit qualified for the WTA Finals for the first time in her career, and was the first Estonian player to qualify for the WTA Finals. After an opening round loss to Veronika Kudermetova in Abu Dhabi, Kontaveit reached her first final of the year at the Grampians Trophy in Melbourne, although she and Ann Li were unable to contest the final match. She lost to Shelby Rogers at the Australian Open, and reached the quarterfinals at Doha, losing to Petra Kvitová, and lost in the third round at Dubai to Aryna Sabalenka. She lost in Miami to Elise Mertens, and lost again to Sabalenka in Stuttgart. After a loss to Sakkari in Madrid, she withdrew from Rome, and lost to Iga Świątek at the French Open. She next reached the final at Eastbourne, losing to Jeļena Ostapenko after defeating No. 7 Bianca Andreescu, before suffering a four-match losing streak at Wimbledon, the Olympics, Montréal, and Cincinnati. She began working with Dmitry Tursunov in August, and immediately won her first title since 2017 at Cleveland, defeating Irina-Camelia Begu in the final, before losing once again to Świątek, this time at the US Open. She won the title at Ostrava without dropping a set, defeating Paula Badosa, Belinda Bencic, Kvitová, and Sakkari, before reaching the quarterfinals at Indian Wells, defeating Andreescu for the second time, before falling to Ons Jabeur. She next won back-to-back titles in Moscow and Cluj-Napoca, defeating Ekaterina Alexandrova and Simona Halep in the two finals.

=== Doubles ===
#	Players	Points	Date qualified
1	(Czech Republic) Barbora Krejčíková (Czech Republic) Kateřina Siniaková	6,450	20 September
2	(Japan) Shuko Aoyama (Japan) Ena Shibahara	5,070	20 September
3	(Chinese Taipei) Hsieh Su-wei (Belgium) Elise Mertens	3,892	19 October 2021
4	(United States) Nicole Melichar-Martinez (Netherlands) Demi Schuurs	3,440	19 October 2021
5	(Australia) Samantha Stosur (China) Zhang Shuai	2,911	19 October 2021
inj.	(United States) Coco Gauff (United States) Caty McNally	2,770	withdrew
6	(Chile) Alexa Guarachi (United States) Desirae Krawczyk	2,695	28 October 2021
7	(Croatia) Darija Jurak (Slovenia) Andreja Klepač	2,650	28 October 2021
inj.	(Canada) Gabriela Dabrowski (Brazil) Luisa Stefani	2,570	withdrew
8	(Canada) Sharon Fichman (Mexico) Giuliana Olmos	2,491	28 October 2021

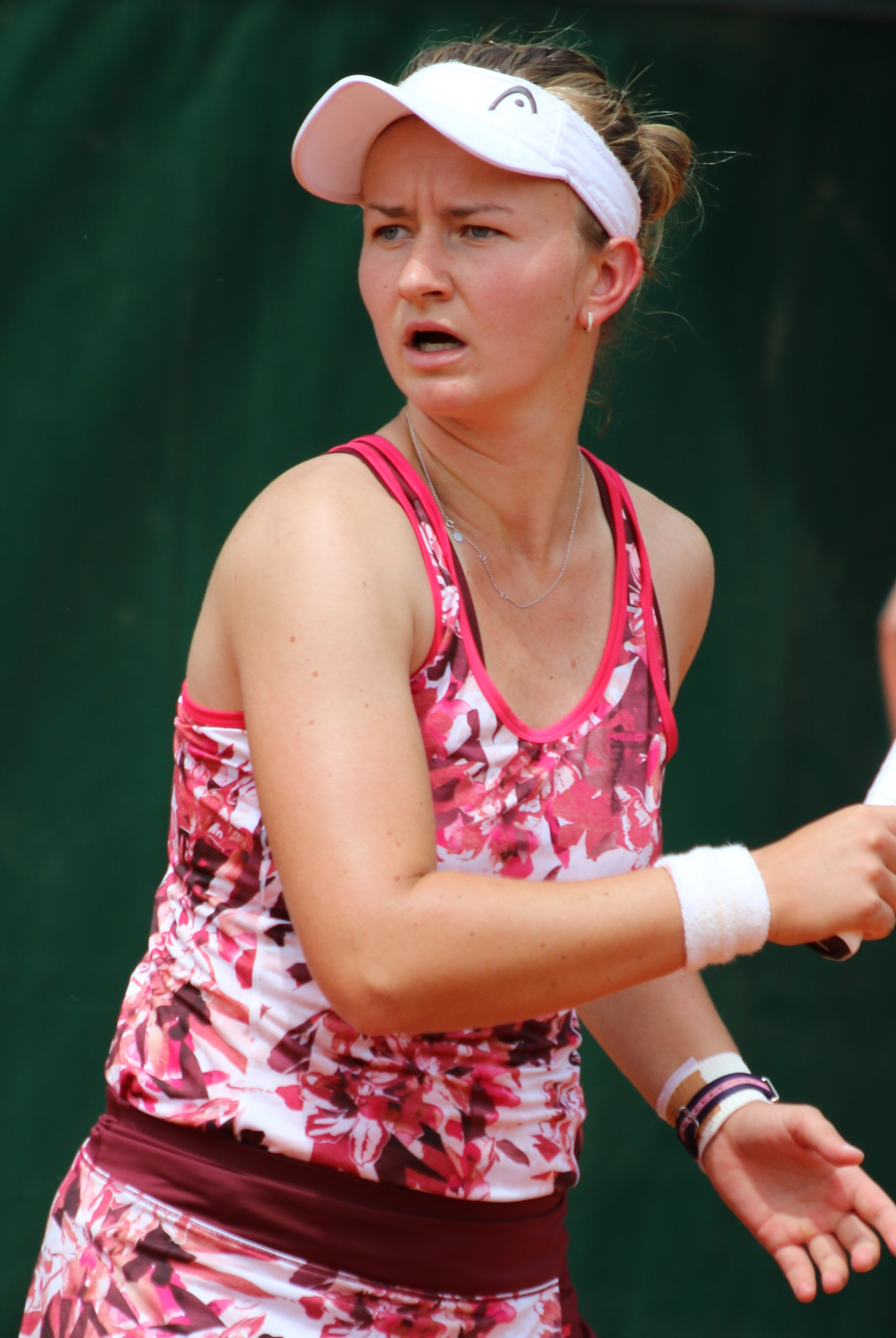
Krejčíková

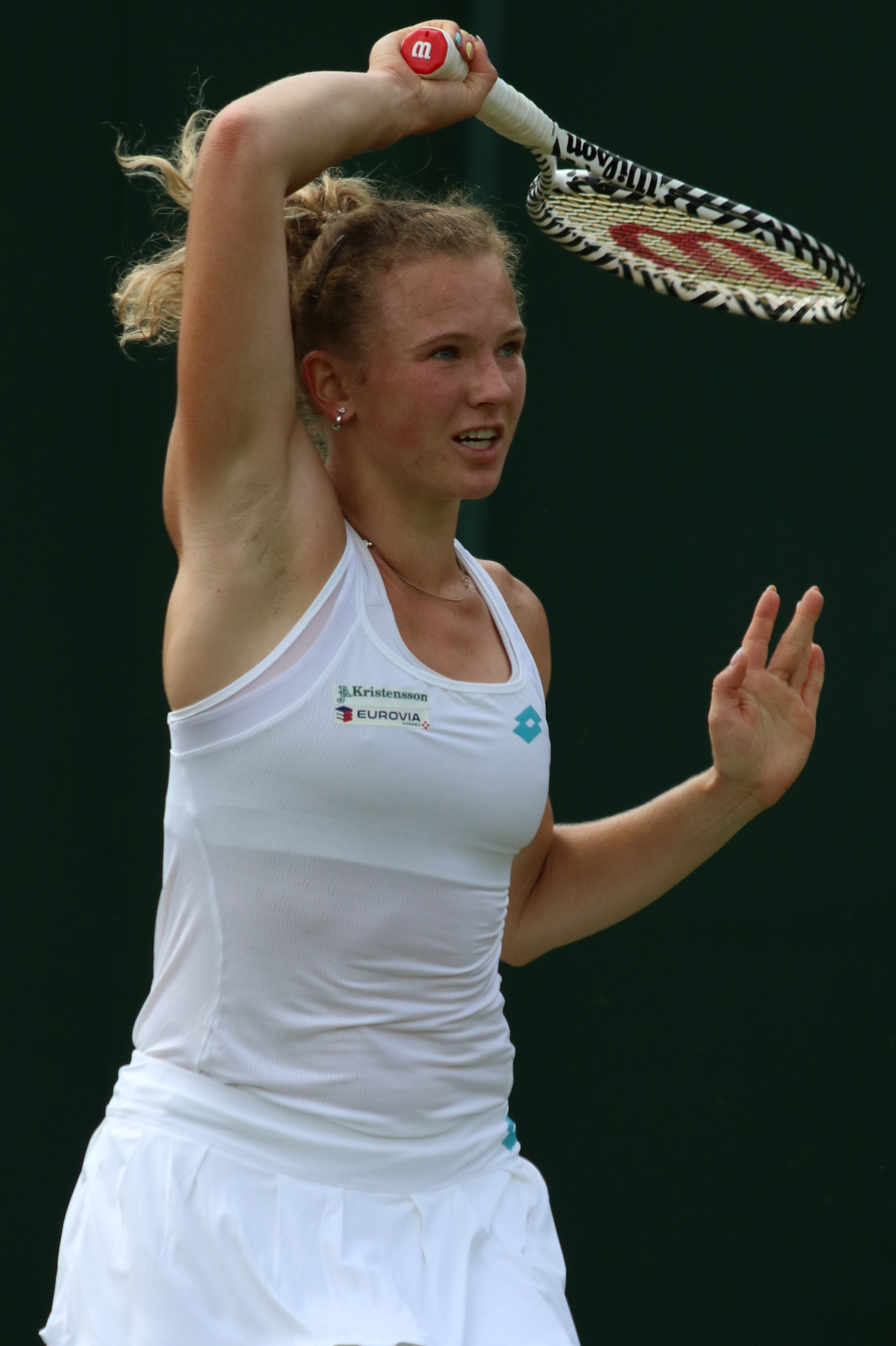
Siniaková

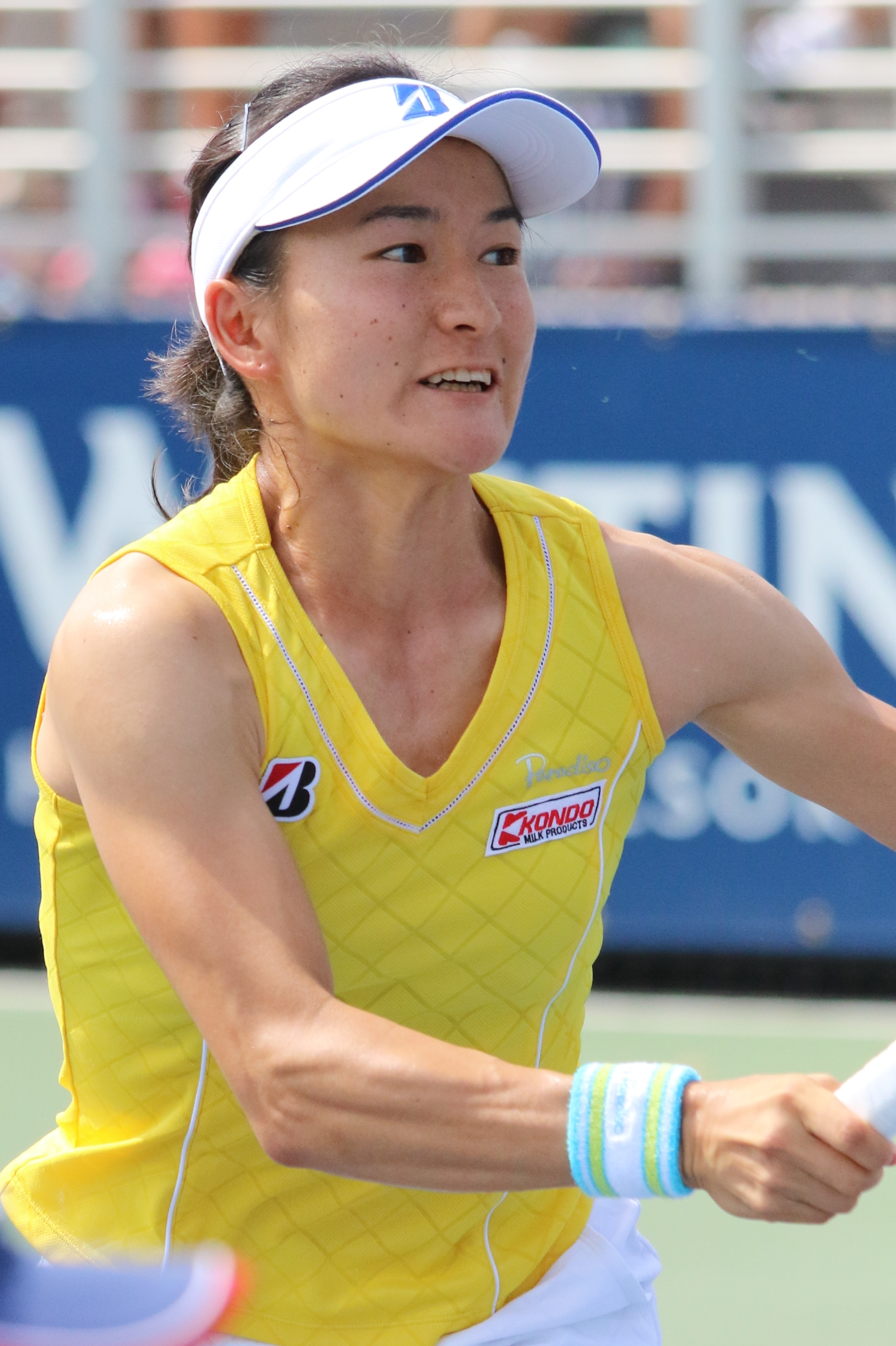
Aoyama

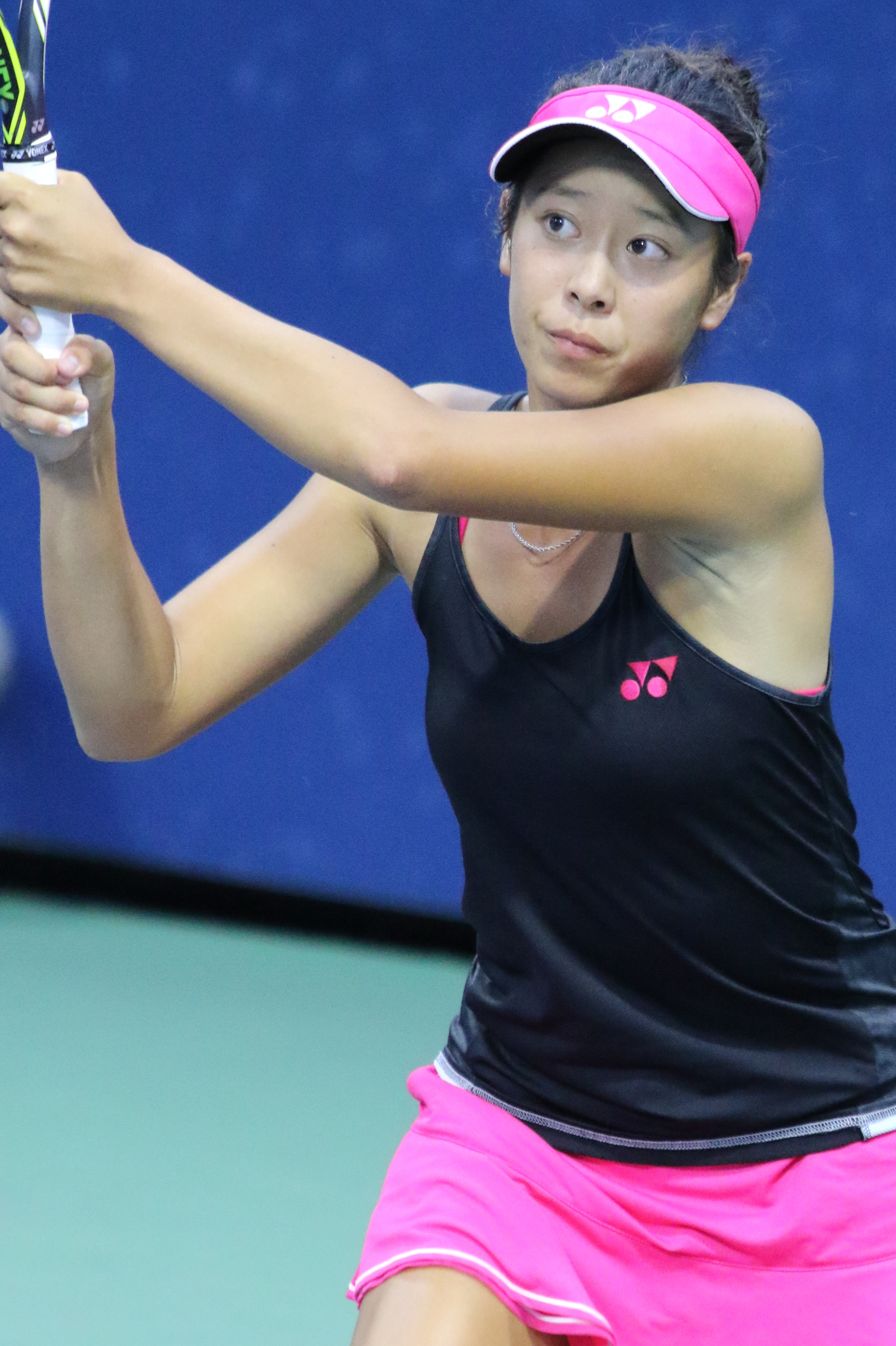
Shibahara

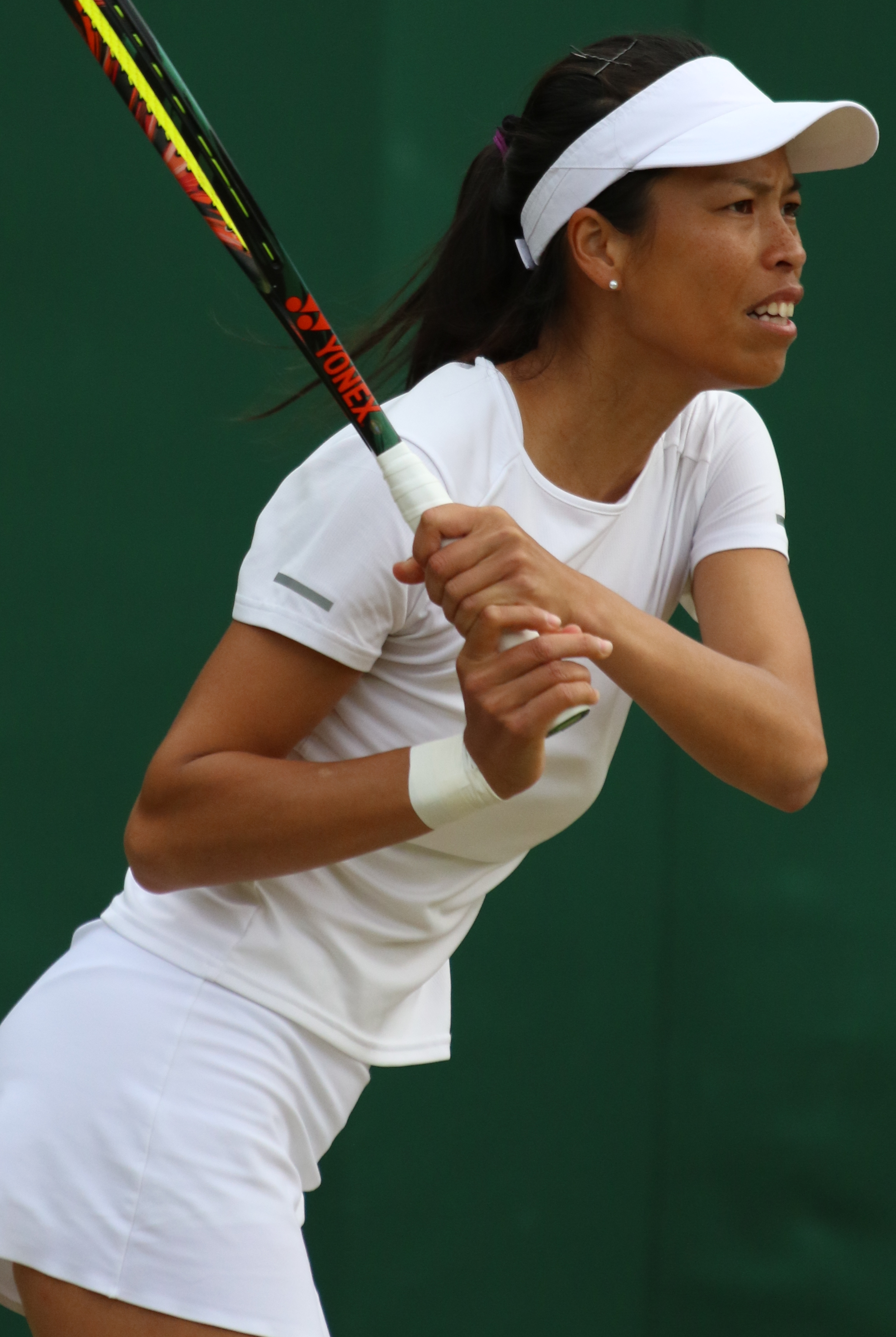
Hsieh

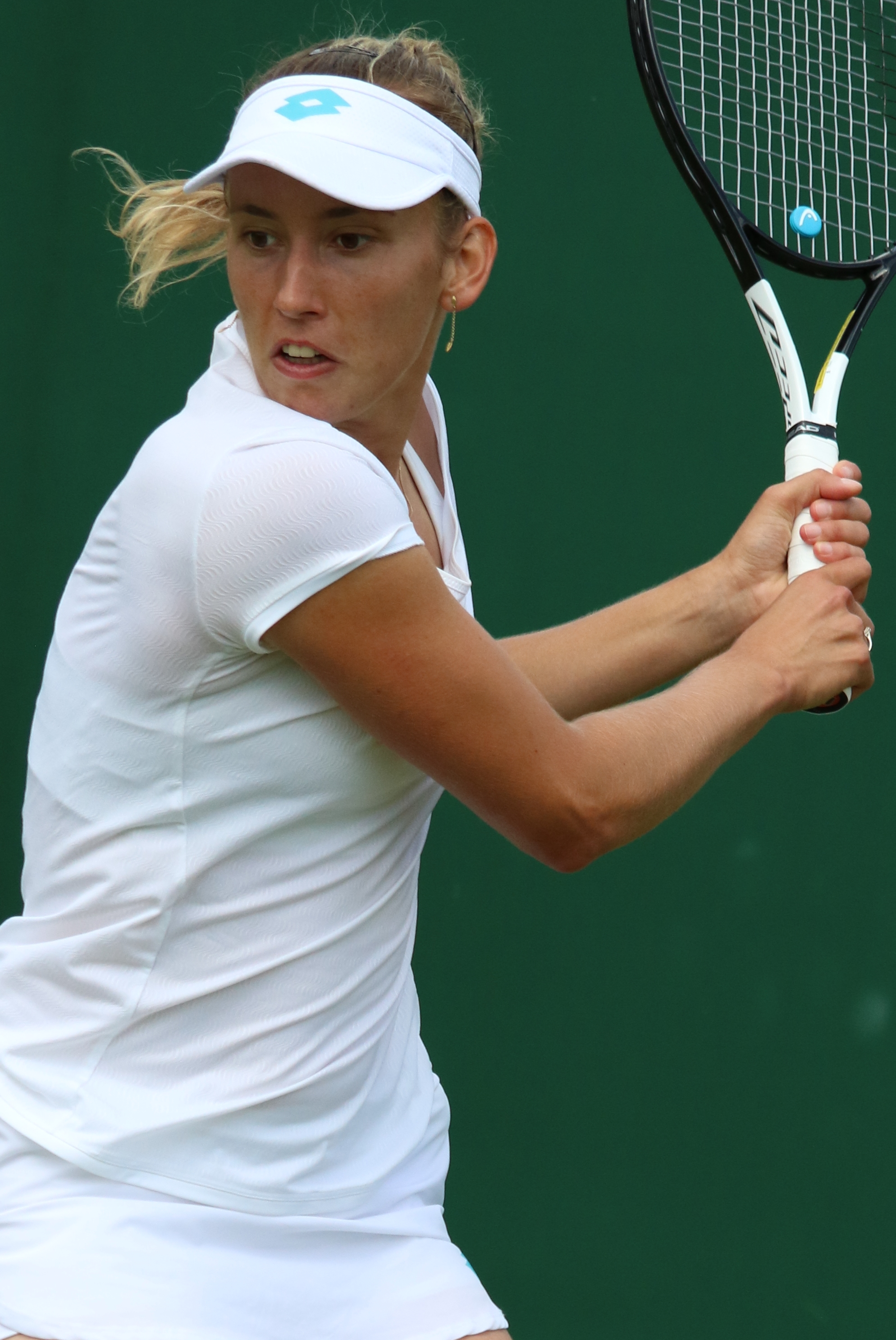
Mertens

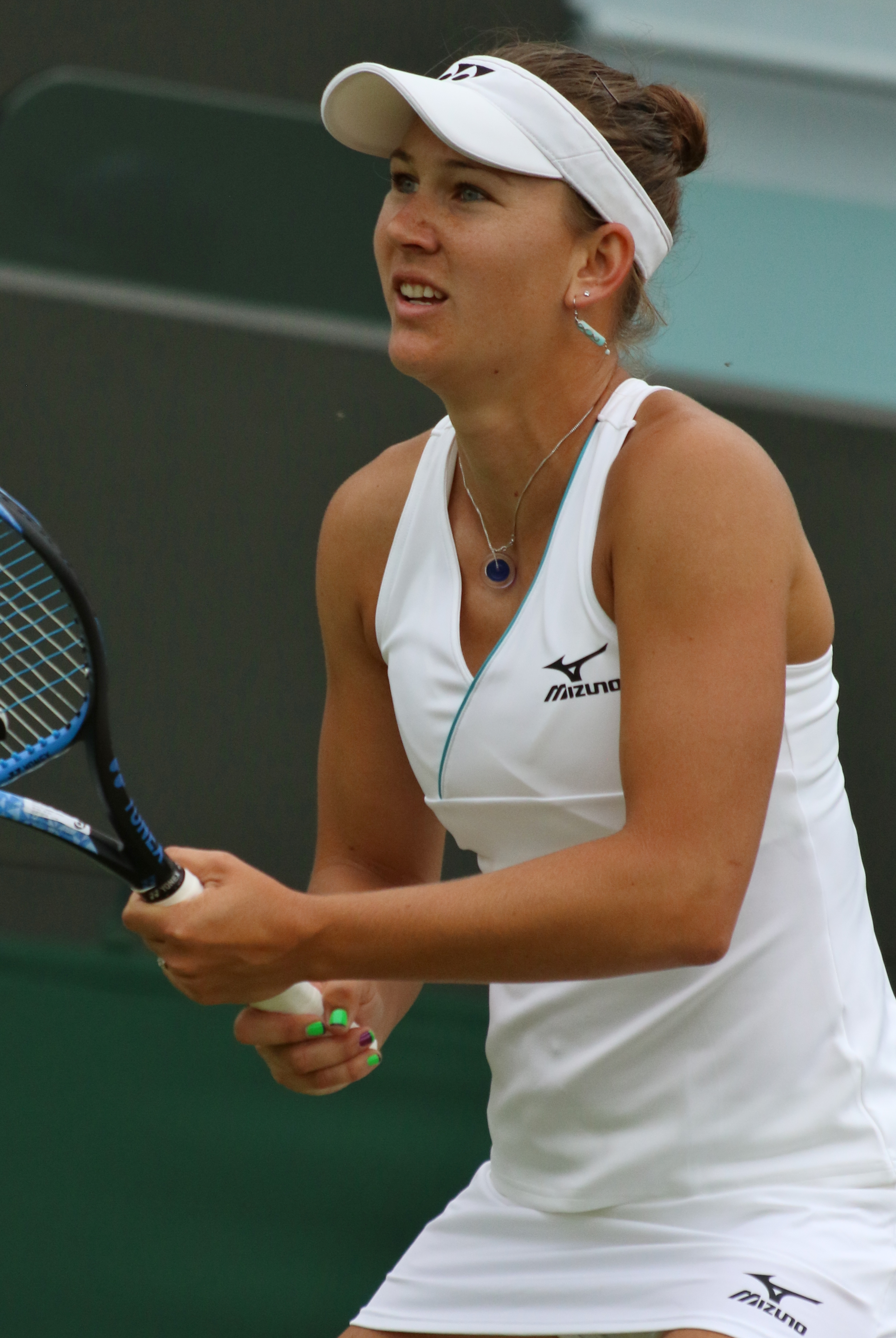
Melichar-Martinez

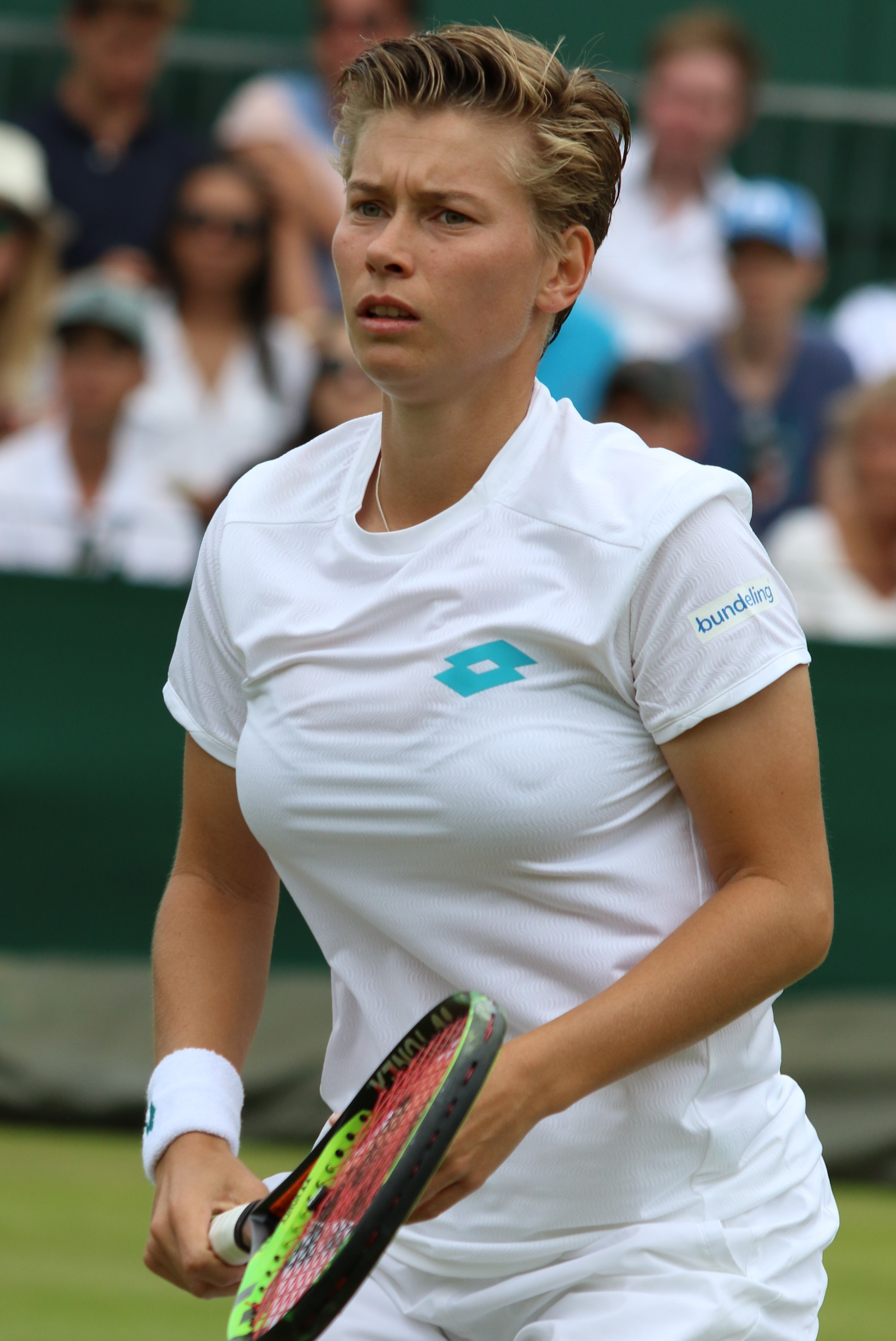
Schuurs

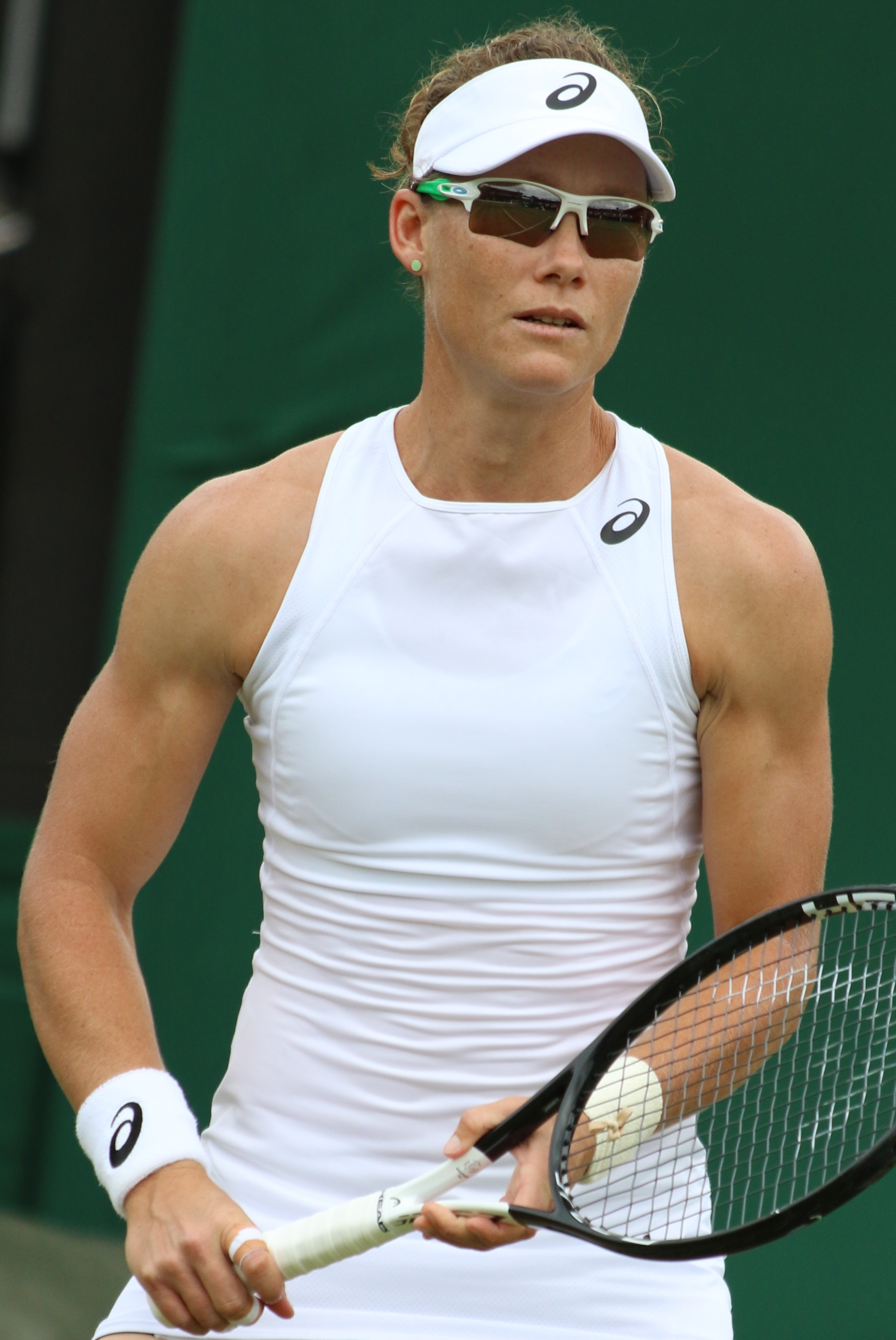
Stosur

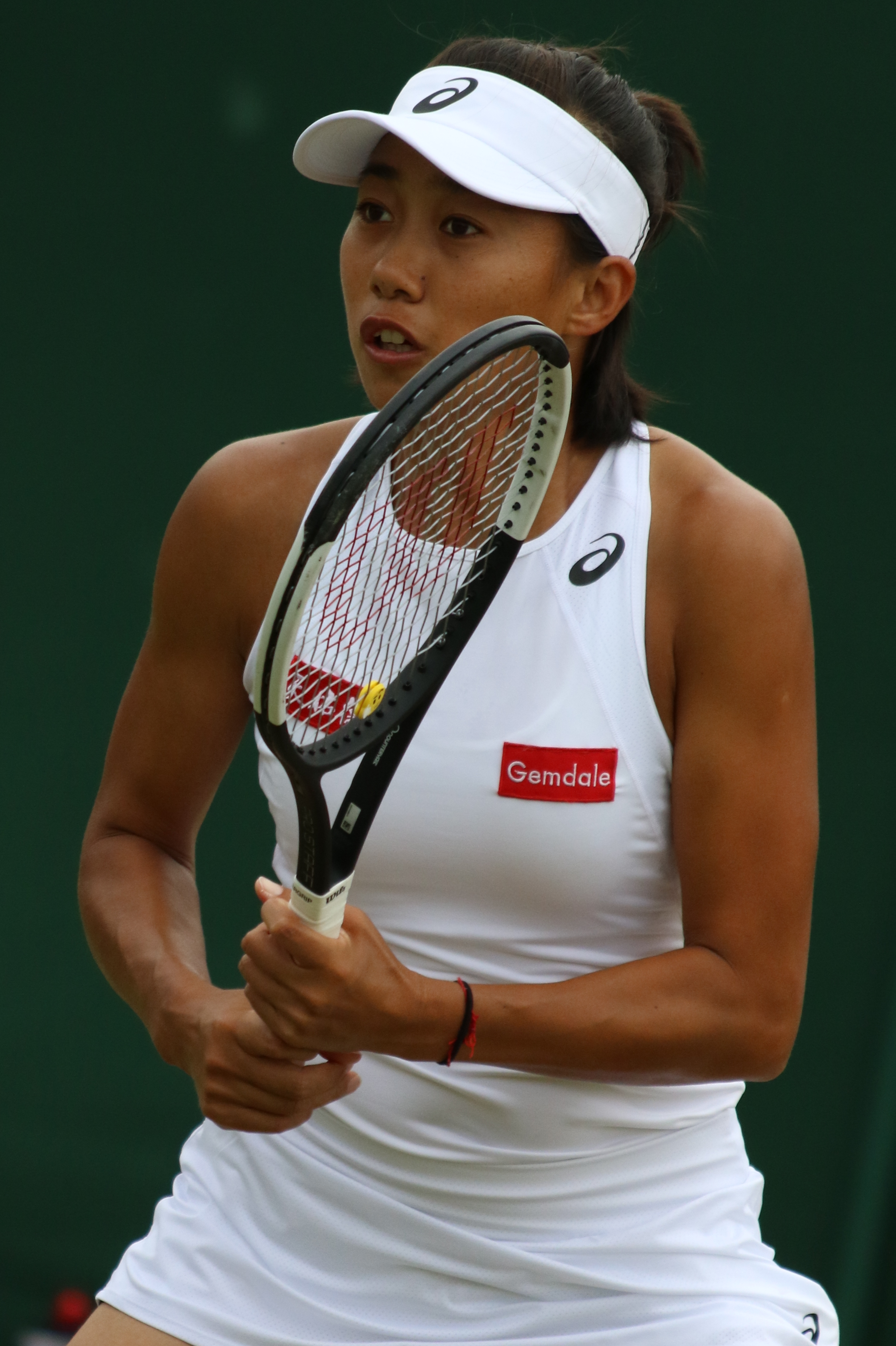
Zhang

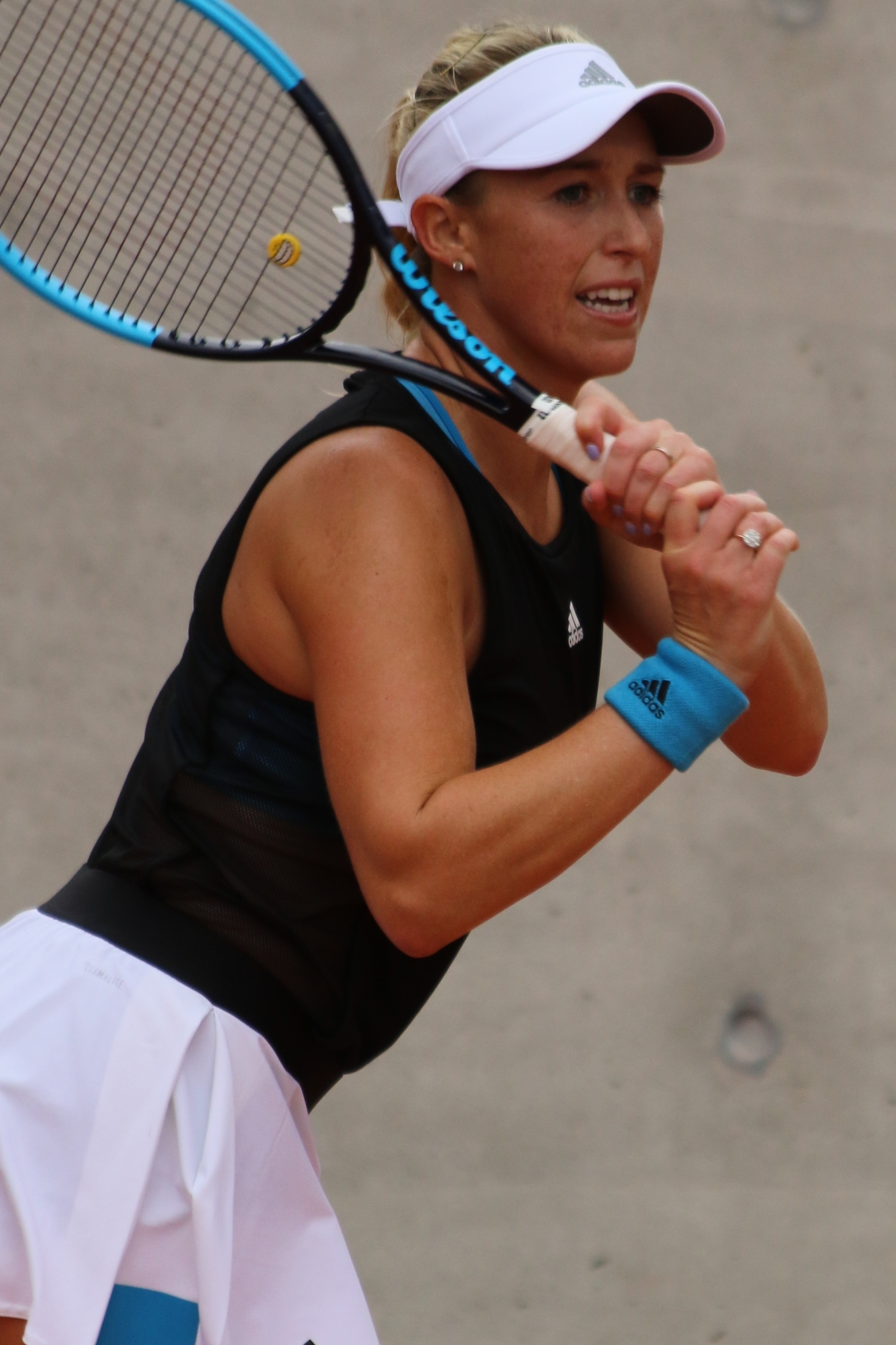
Guarachi

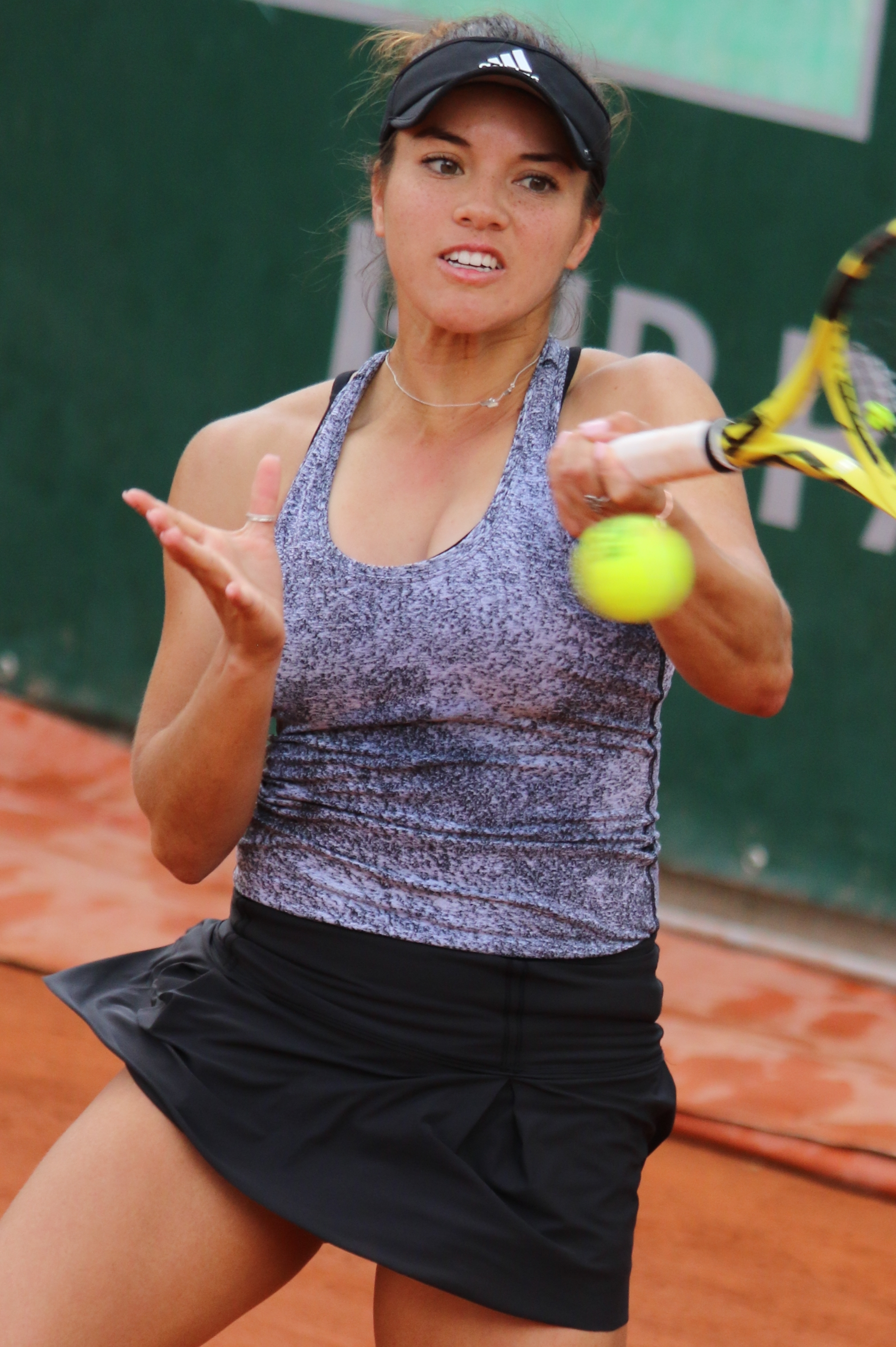
Krawczyk

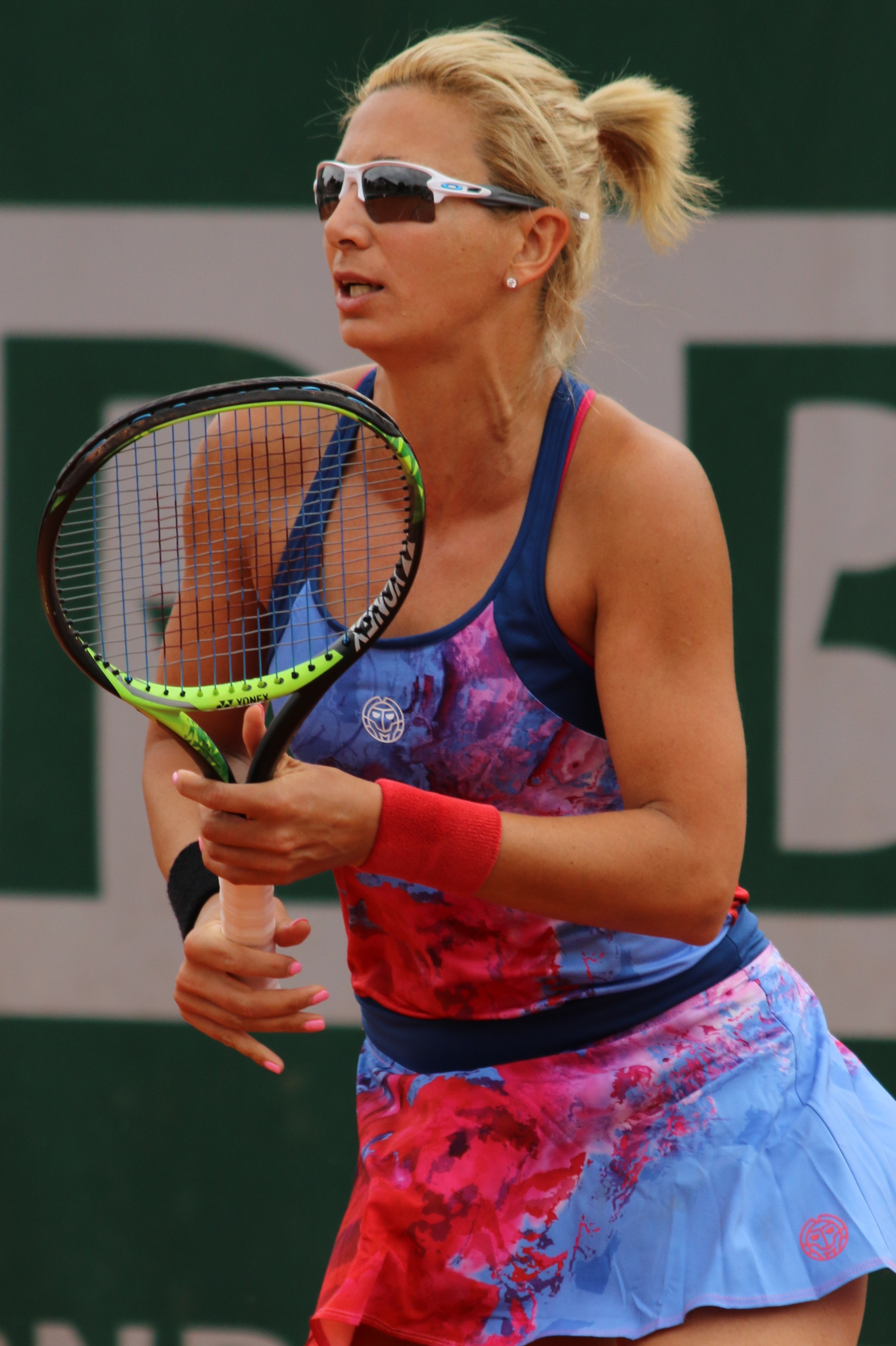
Jurak

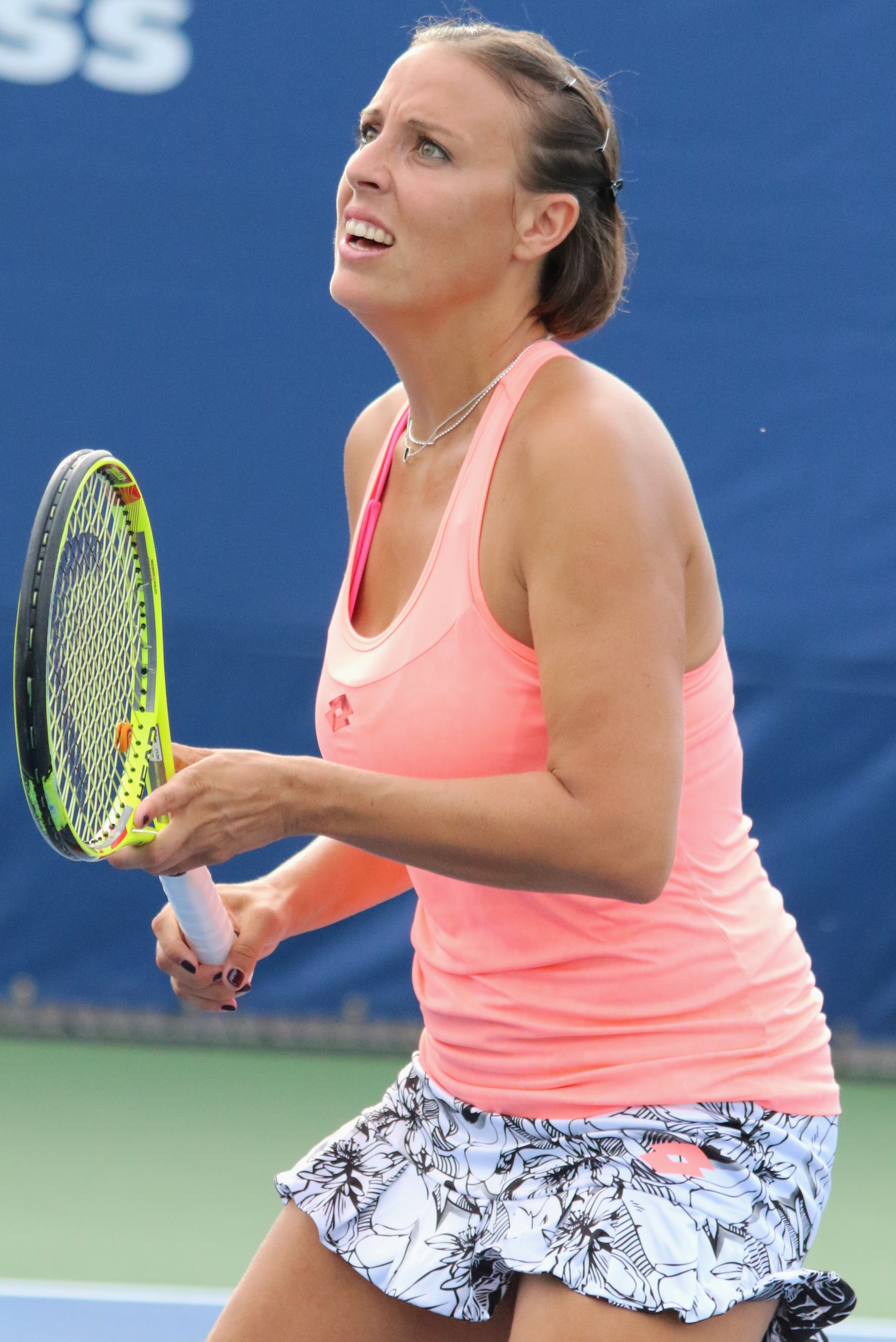
Klepač

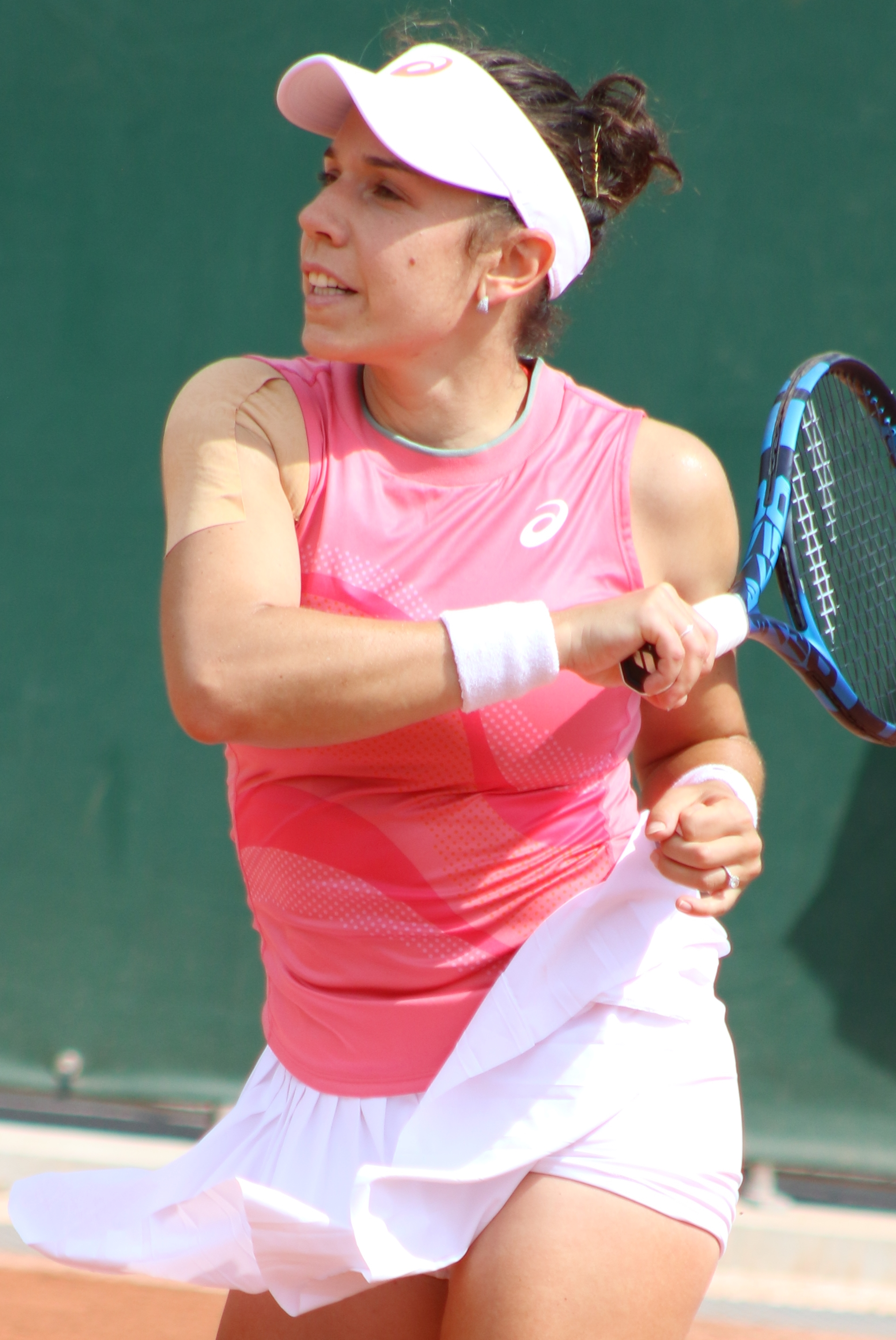
Fichman

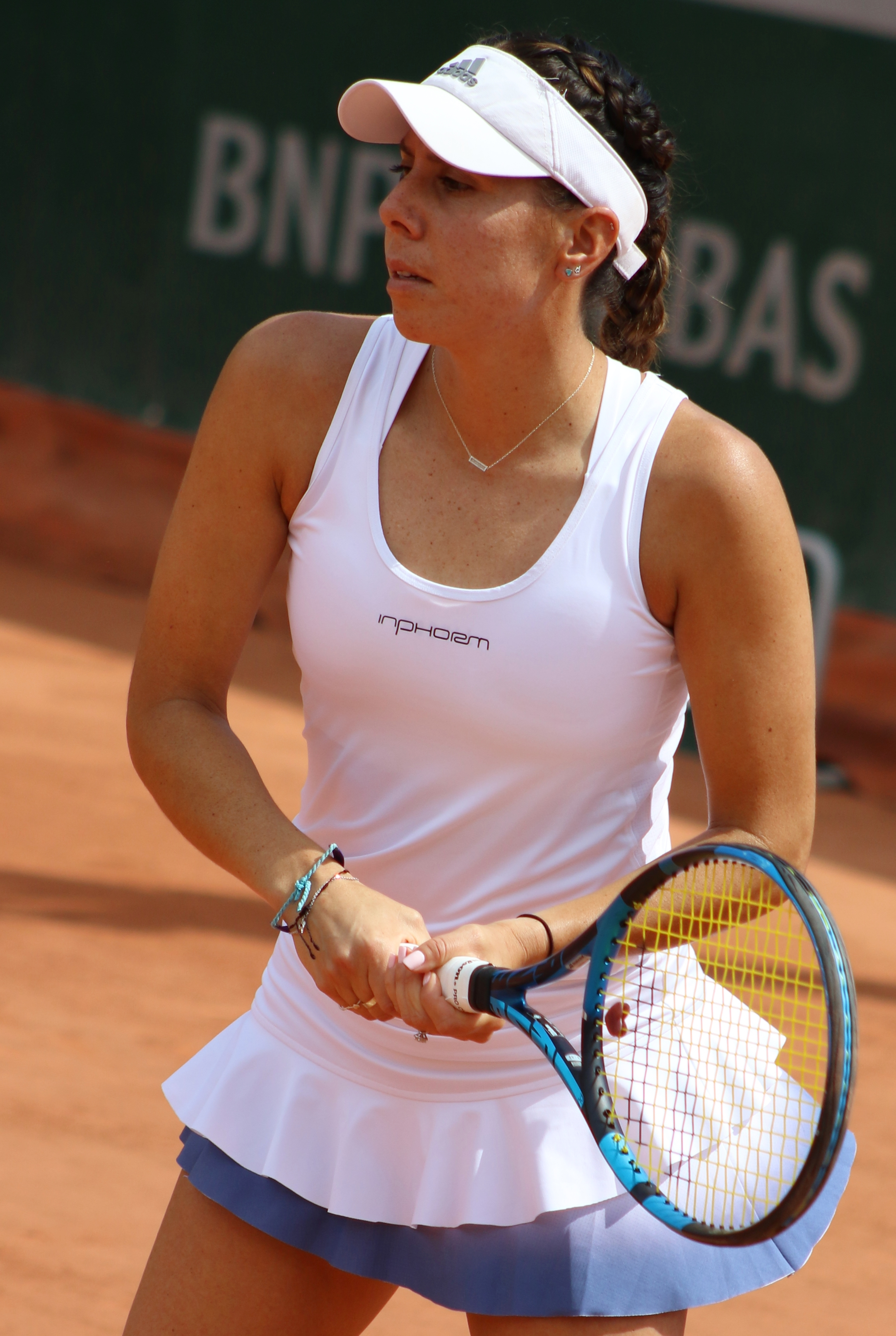
Olmos

== Groupings ==
=== Singles ===
The singles draw of the 2021 edition of the Year–end Championships featured three major champions and one major finalist. The competitors were divided into two groups.

Group Chichén Itzá (Belarus) Aryna Sabalenka [1] (Greece) Maria Sakkari [4] (Poland) Iga Świątek [5] (Spain) Paula Badosa [7]	Group Teotihuacán (Czech Republic) Barbora Krejčíková [2] (Czech Republic) Karolína Plíšková [3] (Spain) Garbiñe Muguruza [6] (Estonia) Anett Kontaveit [8]

=== Doubles ===
The doubles draw of the 2021 edition of the Year–end Championships featured two number-ones, three major champions, and one major finalist team. The pairs were divided into two groups.

Group El Tajín (Czech Republic) Barbora Krejčíková [1] (Czech Republic) Kateřina Siniaková [1] (Chinese Taipei) Hsieh Su-wei [3] (Belgium) Elise Mertens [3] (Chile) Alexa Guarachi [6] (United States) Desirae Krawczyk [6] (Canada) Sharon Fichman [8] (Mexico) Giuliana Olmos [8]	Group Tenochtitlán (Japan) Shuko Aoyama [2] (Japan) Ena Shibahara [2] (United States) Nicole Melichar-Martinez [4] (Netherlands) Demi Schuurs [4] (Australia) Samantha Stosur [5] (China) Zhang Shuai [5] (Croatia) Darija Jurak [7] (Slovenia) Andreja Klepač [7]

== Points breakdown ==
Updated as of 8 November 2021.

=== Singles ===
Player qualified for the WTA Finals.
Player withdrew.

Rank	Player	Grand Slam				WTA 1000					Best other							Total points	Tourn	Titles
Rank	Player	Grand Slam				Mandatory (Note: The China Open was cancelled due to travel restrictions related to the COVID-19 pandemic in mainland China.)			Best two		Best other							Total points	Tourn	Titles
Rank	Player	AUS	FRA	WIM	USO	MI	MA	IW (Note: The Indian Wells Masters was rescheduled to October due to the COVID-19 pandemic.)	1	2	1	2	3	4	5	6	7	Total points	Tourn	Titles
–	(Australia) Ashleigh Barty	QF; 430	R64; 70	W 2000	R32; 130	W 1000	F 650	A 0	W 900	QF; 190	W 470	W 470	QF; 100	R16; 1				6,411	12	5
1	(Belarus) Aryna Sabalenka	R16; 240	R32; 130	SF; 780	SF; 780	QF; 215	W 1000	R16; 1	SF; 350	QF; 190	W 470	F 305	R16; 105	QF; 100	QF; 100	R32; 1	R16; 1	4,768	16	2
2	(Czech Republic) Barbora Krejčíková	R64; 70	W 2000	R16; 240	QF; 430	R64; 35	R64; 10	R16; 120	F 585	QF; 190	W 280	W 280	R16; 105	QF; 100	R16; 30	R32; 30	Q2; 13	4,518	16	3
3	(Czech Republic) Karolína Plíšková	R32; 130	R64; 70	F 1300	QF; 430	R32; 65	R32; 65	R32; 65	F 585	F 585	SF; 350	R16; 105	QF; 100	QF; 100	R16; 55	R32; 30	R16; 1	4,036	17	0
4	(Greece) Maria Sakkari	R128; 10	SF; 780	R64; 70	SF; 780	SF; 390	R16; 120	R64; 10	R16; 105	R32; 60	F 305	SF; 185	SF; 185	SF; 185	QF; 100	R16; 55	R64; 1	3,341	17	0
5	(Poland) Iga Świątek	R16; 240	QF; 430	R16; 240	R16; 240	R32; 65	R16; 120	R16; 120	W 900	R16; 105	W 470	SF; 185	R16; 55	R16; 55	R32; 1			3,226	14	2
6	(Spain) Garbiñe Muguruza	R16; 240	R128; 10	R32; 130	R16; 240	R16; 120	A 0	R64; 10	W 900	R16; 105	W 470	F 305	F 305	R16; 105	QF; 100	QF; 100	R16; 55	3,195	17	2
7	(Spain) Paula Badosa	R128; 10	QF; 430	R16; 240	R64; 70	R64; 35	SF; 390	W 1000	QF; 190	R32; 60	W 280	SF; 185	SF; 110	R16; 55	R16; 55	R32; 1	R32; 1	3,112	16	2
8	(Estonia) Anett Kontaveit	R32; 130	R32; 130	R128; 10	R32; 130	QF; 100	R32; 65	QF; 215	R16; 105	R64; 1	W 470	W 470	F 305	F 305	W 280	W 280	QF; 100	3,096	20	4
Alternates
–	(Tunisia) Ons Jabeur	R32; 130	R16; 240	QF; 430	R32; 130	R16; 120	R16; 120	SF; 390	QF; 190	R16; 105	F 305	W 280	SF; 185	F 180	R16; 105	R16; 55	R16; 55	3,020	19	1
–	(Japan) Naomi Osaka	W 2000	R64; 70	A 0	R32; 130	QF; 215	R32; 65	A 0	R16; 105	R32; 1	SF; 185							2,771	8	1
–	(Russia) Anastasia Pavlyuchenkova	R128; 10	F 1300	R32; 130	R16; 240	R32; 1	SF; 390	R32; 65	R32; 60	R64; 1	QF; 100	R16; 55	R16; 55	R16; 55	R16; 55	R16; 30	R32; 1	2,548	18	0
–	(Ukraine) Elina Svitolina	R16; 240	R32; 130	R64; 70	QF; 430	SF; 390	R64; 10	R16; 120	QF; 190	R32; 1	W 280	SF; 185	QF; 100	QF; 100	QF; 100	QF; 100	R16; 55	2,501	19	1
9	(United States) Jessica Pegula	QF; 430	R32; 130	R64; 70	R32; 130	R16; 120	R16; 120	QF; 215	SF; 350	QF; 190	SF; 210	QF; 190	R16; 105	QF; 100	R16; 55	R16; 55	R16; 30	2,500	18	0
10	(Belgium) Elise Mertens	R16; 240	R32; 130	R32; 130	R16; 240	R16; 120	QF; 215	R64; 10	SF; 350	R32; 60	W 470	SF; 185	F 180	QF; 60	R16; 55	R64; 1	R32; 1	2,447	19	1

=== Doubles ===
Team qualified for the WTA Finals.
Team withdrew due to injury.

Rank	Team	Points											Total points	Tourn	Titles
Rank	Team	1	2	3	4	5	6	7	8	9	10	11 (Note: Points earned at the WTA Finals would replace the 11th best result points at the conclusion of the tournament.)	Total points	Tourn	Titles
1	(Czech Republic) Barbora Krejčíková (Czech Republic) Kateřina Siniaková	W 2000	F 1300	W 1000	W 470	QF; 430	SF; 350	QF; 215	QF; 190	QF; 190	SF; 185	R16; 120	6,450	12	3
2	(Japan) Shuko Aoyama (Japan) Ena Shibahara	W 1000	SF; 780	W 470	W 470	W 470	QF; 430	SF; 390	SF; 350	W 280	R16; 240	QF; 190	5,070	19	5
3	(Chinese Taipei) Hsieh Su-wei (Belgium) Elise Mertens	W 2000	W 1000	QF; 430	R16; 240	SF; 110	QF; 100	R16; 10	R16; 1	R16; 1			3,892	9	2
4	(United States) Nicole Melichar-Martinez (Netherlands) Demi Schuurs	SF; 780	W 470	W 470	F 305	F 305	R16; 240	QF; 190	QF; 190	SF; 185	SF; 185	R16; 120	3,440	17	2
5	(Australia) Samantha Stosur (China) Zhang Shuai	W 2000	W 900	R64; 10	R32; 1								2,911	4	2
–	(United States) Coco Gauff (United States) Caty McNally	F 1300	QF; 430	W 280	R16; 240	QF; 215	R16; 105	QF; 100	QF; 100				2,770	8	1
6	(Chile) Alexa Guarachi (United States) Desirae Krawczyk	SF; 780	W 470	W 280	R16; 240	QF; 190	SF; 185	R16; 120	R16; 120	SF; 110	QF; 100	QF; 100	2,695	20	2
7	(Croatia) Darija Jurak (Slovenia) Andreja Klepač	F 585	W 470	QF; 430	W 280	R16; 240	SF; 185	F 180	R16; 105	R16; 105	QF; 60	R32; 10	2,650	15	2
–	(Canada) Gabriela Dabrowski (Brazil) Luisa Stefani	W 900	SF; 780	F 585	F 305								2,570	4	1
8	(Canada) Sharon Fichman (Mexico) Giuliana Olmos	W 900	QF; 430	R16; 240	R16; 240	SF; 185	R16; 120	R16; 120	QF; 100	QF; 100	R16; 55	R32; 1	2,491	12	1
Alternates
9	(Ukraine) Nadiia Kichenok (Romania) Raluca Olaru	W 470	F 305	W 280	R16; 240	R16; 240	SF; 185	F 180	R32; 130	R16; 120	R16; 105	R16; 55	2,310	16	2
10	(Czech Republic) Marie Bouzková (Czech Republic) Lucie Hradecká	QF; 430	QF; 430	F 305	W 280	W 280	QF; 215	SF; 185	QF; 60	R16; 55	R16; 1	R32; 1	2,242	11	2

== Player head-to-head ==
Below are the head-to-head records as they approached the tournament.

=== Singles ===
		Sabalenka	Krejčíková	Plíšková	Sakkari	Świątek	Muguruza	Badosa	Kontaveit	Overall	YTD W–L
1	(Belarus) Aryna Sabalenka		2–0	2–2	4–1	0–0	1–2	0–1	4–0	13–6	44–16
2	(Czech Republic) Barbora Krejčíková	0–2		0–2	3–0	0–2	2–1	0–2	0–0	5–9	45–16
3	(Czech Republic) Karolína Plíšková	2–2	2–0		1–2	0–1	8–2	2–0	3–0	18–7	35–18
4	(Greece) Maria Sakkari	1–4	0–3	2–1		2–0	1–1	0–0	6–5	12–14	36–18
5	(Poland) Iga Świątek	0–0	2–0	1–0	0–2		0–1	0–1	2–2	5–6	35–13
6	(Spain) Garbiñe Muguruza	2–1	1–2	2–8	1–1	1–0		0–0	2–2	9–14	38–16
7	(Spain) Paula Badosa	1–0	2–0	0–2	0–0	1–0	0–0		0–1	4–3	41–15
8	(Estonia) Anett Kontaveit	0–4	0–0	0–3	5–6	2–2	2–2	1–0		10–17	45–15

=== Doubles ===
		Krejčíková; Siniaková	Aoyama; Shibahara	Hsieh; Mertens	Melichar; Schuurs	Stosur; Zhang	Guarachi; Krawczyk	Jurak; Klepač	Fichman; Olmos	Overall	YTD
1	(Czech Republic) Barbora Krejčíková (Czech Republic) Kateřina Siniaková		0–0	0–0	0–0	0–2	0–0	0–0	1–0	1–2	40–11
2	(Japan) Shuko Aoyama (Japan) Ena Shibahara	0–0		0–2	2–1	0–1	0–1	0–1	1–2	3–8	39–16
3	(Chinese Taipei) Hsieh Su-wei (Belgium) Elise Mertens	0–0	2–0		0–0	0–0	0–0	0–0	0–1	2–1	20–7
4	(United States) Nicole Melichar-Martinez (Netherlands) Demi Schuurs	0–0	1–2	0–0		0–1	0–0	0–0	0–0	1–3	30–16
5	(Australia) Samantha Stosur (China) Zhang Shuai	2–0	1–0	0–0	1–0		1–0	0–0	0–0	5–0	11–2
6	(Chile) Alexa Guarachi (United States) Desirae Krawczyk	0–0	1–0	0–0	0–0	0–1		0–1	0–0	1–2	25–20
7	(Croatia) Darija Jurak (Slovenia) Andreja Klepač	0–0	1–0	0–0	0–0	0–0	1–0		0–0	2–0	27–13
8	(Canada) Sharon Fichman (Mexico) Giuliana Olmos	0–1	2–1	1–0	0–0	0–0	0–0	0–0		2–2	22–11

== See also ==
- 2021 WTA Tour
- 2021 ATP Finals
