= 2021 Kremlin Cup =

Tennis tournament in Moscow

- Date: 18–24 October
- Edition: 31st (men) / 25th (women)
- Category: ATP 250 (men); WTA 500 (women)
- Prize money: ATP $697,125; WTA $565,530
- Surface: Hard (indoor)
- Location: Moscow, Russia
- Venue: Irina Viner-Usmanova Gymnastics Palace; Luzhniki Palace of Sports

Champions

Men's singles
- (Russia) Aslan Karatsev

Women's singles
- (Estonia) Anett Kontaveit

Men's doubles
- (Finland) Harri Heliövaara / (Netherlands) Matwé Middelkoop

Women's doubles
- (Latvia) Jeļena Ostapenko / (Czech Republic) Kateřina Siniaková
- Kremlin Cup

The 2021 Kremlin Cup (also known as the 2021 VTB Kremlin Cup for sponsorship reasons) was a professional tennis tournament played on indoor hard courts. It was the 31st edition of the Kremlin Cup for the men and the 25th edition for the women. The tournament was part of the ATP 250 series of the 2021 ATP Tour, and of the WTA 500 series of the 2021 WTA Tour. It was held at the Irina Viner-Usmanova Gymnastics Palace and the Luzhniki Palace of Sports in Moscow, Russia, from 18 October through 24 October 2021.

== Champions ==
=== Men's singles ===
- (Russia) Aslan Karatsev def. (Croatia) Marin Čilić, 6–2, 6–4

=== Women's singles ===
- (Estonia) Anett Kontaveit def. (Russia) Ekaterina Alexandrova, 4–6, 6–4, 7–5.

This was Kontaveit's 4th WTA title, and 3rd of the year.

=== Men's doubles ===
- (Finland) Harri Heliövaara / (Netherlands) Matwé Middelkoop def. (Bosnia and Herzegovina) Tomislav Brkić / (Serbia) Nikola Ćaćić, 7–5, 4–6, [11–9]

=== Women's doubles ===
- (Latvia) Jeļena Ostapenko / (Czech Republic) Kateřina Siniaková def. (Ukraine) Nadiia Kichenok / (Romania) Raluca Olaru, 6–2, 4–6, [10–8]

== ATP singles main-draw entrants ==
=== Seeds ===
Country	Player	Rank^{1}	Seed
RUS	Andrey Rublev	5	1
RUS	Aslan Karatsev	23	2
RUS	Karen Khachanov	29	3
KAZ	Alexander Bublik	34	4
SRB	Filip Krajinović	37	5
CRO	Marin Čilić	41	6
~~BLR~~	~~Ilya Ivashka~~	~~45~~	~~7~~
SRB	Laslo Đere	47	8

- Rankings are as of October 4, 2021

=== Other entrants ===
The following players received wildcards into the singles main draw:

- (Russia) Evgeny Donskoy
- (Russia) Alibek Kachmazov
- (Russia) Roman Safiullin

The following players received entry using a protected ranking:

- (Argentina) Guido Pella
- (France) Gilles Simon

The following players received entry from the qualifying draw:

- (Bosnia and Herzegovina) Damir Džumhur
- (Belarus) Egor Gerasimov
- (Croatia) Borna Gojo
- (Ukraine) Illya Marchenko

The following player received entry as a lucky loser:

- (Lithuania) Ričardas Berankis

=== Withdrawals ===
Before the tournament

- (Spain) Pablo Andújar → replaced by (Argentina) Federico Coria
- (Belarus) Ilya Ivashka → replaced by (Lithuania) Ričardas Berankis
- (United States) Sebastian Korda → replaced by (France) Gilles Simon
- (Russia) Daniil Medvedev → replaced by (Sweden) Mikael Ymer

== ATP doubles main-draw entrants ==
=== Seeds ===
Country	Player	Country	Player	Rank^{1}	Seed
RSA	Raven Klaasen	JPN	Ben McLachlan	57	1
KAZ	Andrey Golubev	MON	Hugo Nys	94	2
AUS	Luke Saville	AUS	John-Patrick Smith	96	3
BIH	Tomislav Brkić	SRB	Nikola Ćaćić	97	4

- ^{1} Rankings are as of October 4, 2021

=== Other entrants ===
The following pairs received wildcards into the doubles main draw:

- (Russia) Aslan Karatsev / (Russia) Richard Muzaev
- (Russia) Pavel Kotov / (Russia) Roman Safiullin

=== Withdrawals ===
Before the tournament

- (Spain) Pablo Andújar / (Serbia) Laslo Đere → replaced by (Serbia) Laslo Đere / (Argentina) Guido Pella
- (El Salvador) Marcelo Arévalo / (Netherlands) Matwé Middelkoop → replaced by (Finland) Harri Heliövaara / (Netherlands) Matwé Middelkoop
- (Croatia) Marin Čilić / (United States) Sebastian Korda → replaced by (Belarus) Ilya Ivashka / (Spain) Pedro Martínez

== WTA singles main-draw entrants ==
=== Seeds ===
Country	Player	Rank^{1}	Seed
BLR	Aryna Sabalenka	2	1
ESP	Garbiñe Muguruza	6	2
GRE	Maria Sakkari	9	3
RUS	Anastasia Pavlyuchenkova	13	4
TUN	Ons Jabeur	14	5
~~GER~~	~~Angelique Kerber~~	~~15~~	~~6~~
KAZ	Elena Rybakina	16	7
ROU	Simona Halep	17	8
EST	Anett Kontaveit	20	9

- Rankings are as of October 4, 2021 .

=== Other entrants ===
The following players received wildcards into the singles main draw:

- (Romania) Simona Halep
- (Estonia) Anett Kontaveit
- (Russia) Anastasia Potapova
- (Belarus) Aryna Sabalenka

The following players received entry from the qualifying draw:

- (Russia) Anna Kalinskaya
- (Serbia) Aleksandra Krunić
- (United States) Bernarda Pera
- (Russia) Oksana Selekhmeteva
- (Ukraine) Lesia Tsurenko
- (China) Zheng Qinwen

The following player received entry as a lucky loser:

- (Romania) Irina Bara

=== Withdrawals ===
Before the tournament

- (Canada) Bianca Andreescu → replaced by (Ukraine) Anhelina Kalinina
- (Spain) Paula Badosa → replaced by (Germany) Andrea Petkovic
- (Switzerland) Belinda Bencic → replaced by (Ukraine) Dayana Yastremska
- (United States) Danielle Collins → replaced by (Czech Republic) Markéta Vondroušová
- (Germany) Angelique Kerber → replaced by (Romania) Irina Bara
- (Croatia) Petra Martić → replaced by (Czech Republic) Kateřina Siniaková
- (Belgium) Elise Mertens → replaced by (Russia) Liudmila Samsonova
- (United Kingdom) Emma Raducanu → replaced by (Czech Republic) Tereza Martincová

== WTA doubles main-draw entrants ==
=== Seeds ===
Country	Player	Country	Player	Rank^{1}	Seed
CHI	Alexa Guarachi	USA	Desirae Krawczyk	29	1
LAT	Jeļena Ostapenko	CZE	Kateřina Siniaková	35	2
CZE	Marie Bouzková	CZE	Lucie Hradecká	70	3
UKR	Nadiia Kichenok	ROU	Raluca Olaru	72	4

- ^{1} Rankings are as of October 4, 2021

=== Other entrants ===
The following pair received a wildcard into the doubles main draw:

- (Russia) Oksana Selekhmeteva / (Russia) Anastasia Tikhonova

The following pair received entry using a protected ranking:

- (Belarus) Vera Lapko / (Belarus) Lidziya Marozava

=== Withdrawals ===
Before the tournament

- (Canada) Sharon Fichman / (Mexico) Giuliana Olmos → replaced by (Russia) Anna Kalinskaya / (Russia) Anastasia Potapova
- (Russia) Veronika Kudermetova / (Russia) Elena Vesnina → replaced by (Russia) Natela Dzalamidze / (Russia) Kamilla Rakhimova
- (Australia) Arina Rodionova / (Belarus) Aliaksandra Sasnovich → replaced by (Kazakhstan) Anna Danilina / (Australia) Arina Rodionova
- (Romania) Monica Niculescu / (Romania) Elena-Gabriela Ruse → replaced by (Belarus) Vera Lapko / (Belarus) Lidziya Marozava
