= 2021 WTA Finals – Singles =

Singles
- 2021 WTA Finals

Final
- Champion: (Spain) Garbiñe Muguruza
- Runner-up: (Estonia) Anett Kontaveit
- Score: 6–3, 7–5

Details
- Draw: 8 (RR + elimination)
- Seeds: 8

Events
Singles	Doubles
- WTA Finals

Garbiñe Muguruza defeated Anett Kontaveit in the final, 6–3, 7–5 to win the singles tennis title at the 2021 WTA Finals. It was her 10th career WTA Tour title.

Ashleigh Barty was the reigning champion from when the event was last held in 2019, but withdrew to prioritize her recovery and prepare for the upcoming season.

Aryna Sabalenka, Barbora Krejčíková, Maria Sakkari, Iga Świątek, Paula Badosa, and Kontaveit made their singles debuts at the event. Krejčíková was the only player in this edition to qualify for both the singles and doubles tournaments.

== Seeds ==
1. (Belarus) Aryna Sabalenka (round robin)
2. (Czech Republic) Barbora Krejčíková (round robin)
3. (Czech Republic) Karolína Plíšková (round robin)
4. (Greece) Maria Sakkari (semifinals)
5. (Poland) Iga Świątek (round robin)
6. (Spain) Garbiñe Muguruza (champion)
7. (Spain) Paula Badosa (semifinals)
8. (Estonia) Anett Kontaveit (final)

== Alternates ==
1. (United States) Jessica Pegula (did not play)
2. (Belgium) Elise Mertens (did not play)

Notes:

- Ons Jabeur, Naomi Osaka, Anastasia Pavlyuchenkova, and Elina Svitolina all qualified as alternates but withdrew before the start of the event

== Draw ==
=== Finals ===
Semifinals
7	(Spain) Paula Badosa	3	3
6	(Spain) Garbiñe Muguruza	6	6
8	(Estonia) Anett Kontaveit	6	3	6
4	(Greece) Maria Sakkari	1	6	3

Final
6	(Spain) Garbiñe Muguruza	6	7
8	(Estonia) Anett Kontaveit	3	5

=== Group Chichén Itzá ===
		(Belarus) Sabalenka	(Greece) Sakkari	(Poland) Świątek	(Spain) Badosa	RR; W–L	Set; W–L	Game; W–L	Standings
1	(Belarus) Aryna Sabalenka		6–7^{(1–7)}, 7–6^{(8–6)}, 3–6	2–6, 6–2, 7–5	4–6, 0–6	1–2	3–5 (38%)	35–44 (44%)	3
4	(Greece) Maria Sakkari	7–6^{(7–1)}, 6–7^{(6–8)}, 6–3		6–2, 6–4	6–7^{(4–7)}, 4–6	2–1	4–3 (57%)	41–35 (54%)	2
5	(Poland) Iga Świątek	6–2, 2–6, 5–7	2–6, 4–6		7–5, 6–4	1–2	3–4 (43%)	32–36 (47%)	4
7	(Spain) Paula Badosa	6–4, 6–0	7–6^{(7–4)}, 6–4	5–7, 4–6		2–1	4–2 (67%)	34–27 (56%)	1

=== Group Teotihuacán ===
		(Czech Republic) Krejčíková	(Czech Republic) Plíšková	(Spain) Muguruza	(Estonia) Kontaveit	RR; W–L	Set; W–L	Game; W–L	Standings
2	(Czech Republic) Barbora Krejčíková		6–0, 4–6, 4–6	6–2, 3–6, 4–6	3–6, 4–6	0–3	2–6 (25%)	34–38 (47%)	4
3	(Czech Republic) Karolína Plíšková	0–6, 6–4, 6–4		4–6, 6–2, 7–6^{(8–6)}	4–6, 0–6	2–1	4–4 (50%)	33–40 (45%)	3
6	(Spain) Garbiñe Muguruza	2–6, 6–3, 6–4	6–4, 2–6, 6–7^{(6–8)}		6–4, 6–4	2–1	5–3 (63%)	40–38 (51%)	2
8	(Estonia) Anett Kontaveit	6–3, 6–4	6–4, 6–0	4–6, 4–6		2–1	4–2 (67%)	32–23 (58%)	1

Standings are determined by: 1. number of wins; 2. number of matches; 3. in two-player ties, head-to-head records; 4. in three-player ties, (a) percentage of sets won (head-to-head records if two players remain tied), then (b) percentage of games won (head-to-head records if two players remain tied), then (c) WTA rankings.
