= 2021 Kremlin Cup – Men's singles =

Men's singles
- 2021 Kremlin Cup

Final
- Champion: (Russia) Aslan Karatsev
- Runner-up: (Croatia) Marin Čilić
- Score: 6–2, 6–4

Details
- Draw: 28 (4 Q / 3 WC )
- Seeds: 8

Events
Singles	men	women
Doubles	men	women
← 2019 ·	Kremlin Cup	· 2022 →

Andrey Rublev was the reigning champion from when the tournament was last held in 2019, but lost to Adrian Mannarino in the second round in a rematch of the 2019 final.

Aslan Karatsev won the title, defeating Marin Čilić in the final, 6–2, 6–4.

== Seeds ==
The top four seeds received a bye into the second round.

1. (Russia) Andrey Rublev (second round)
2. (Russia) Aslan Karatsev (champion)
3. (Russia) Karen Khachanov (semifinals)
4. (Serbia) Filip Krajinović (second round)
5. (Kazakhstan) Alexander Bublik (first round)
6. (Croatia) Marin Čilić (final)
7. (Belarus) Ilya Ivashka (withdrew)
8. (Serbia) Laslo Đere (first round)

== Draw ==
=== Key ===
- Q = Qualifier
- WC = Wild card
- LL = Lucky loser
- Alt = Alternate
- SE = Special exempt
- PR = Protected ranking
- ITF = ITF entry
- JE = Junior exempt
- w/o = Walkover
- r = Retired
- d = Defaulted
- SR = Special ranking

=== Finals ===
Semifinals
LL	(Lithuania) Ričardas Berankis	3	4
6	(Croatia) Marin Čilić	6	6
3	(Russia) Karen Khachanov	6^{7}	1
2	(Russia) Aslan Karatsev	7^{9}	6

Final
6	(Croatia) Marin Čilić	2	4
2	(Russia) Aslan Karatsev	6	6

=== Top half ===
First round
WC	(Russia) R Safiullin	6	6^{6}	4
(France) A Mannarino	1	7^{8}	6
(Argentina) F Coria	6	5	6
WC	(Russia) A Kachmazov	2	7	2
WC	(Russia) E Donskoy	1	3
LL	(Lithuania) R Berankis	6	6
PR	(Argentina) G Pella	2	0^{r}
(Spain) P Martínez	6	0
(United States) T Paul	7^{9}	7
(Sweden) M Ymer	6^{7}	5
Q	(Bosnia and Herzegovina) D Džumhur	7^{7}	1	1
6	(Croatia) M Čilić	6^{4}	6	6

Second round
1	(Russia) A Rublev	7	6^{4}	3
(France) A Mannarino	5	7^{7}	6
(Argentina) F Coria	2	1
LL	(Lithuania) R Berankis	6	6
4	(Serbia) F Krajinović	3	4
(Spain) P Martínez	6	6
(United States) T Paul	5	3
6	(Croatia) M Čilić	7	6

Quarterfinals
(France) A Mannarino	2	6^{1}
LL	(Lithuania) R Berankis	6	7^{7}
(Spain) P Martínez	1	2
6	(Croatia) M Čilić	6	6

Semifinals
LL	(Lithuania) R Berankis	3	4
6	(Croatia) M Čilić	6	6

=== Bottom half ===
First round
5	(Kazakhstan) A Bublik	4	3
Q	(Ukraine) I Marchenko	6	6
(Australia) J Millman	6^{5}	6	6
(France) B Bonzi	7^{7}	4	3
(Australia) J Duckworth	3	7	6
Q	(Croatia) B Gojo	6	5	2
8	(Serbia) L Đere	7^{7}	5	3
PR	(France) G Simon	6^{3}	7	6
(United States) M McDonald	6	6
(Japan) Y Nishioka	3	4
(Serbia) M Kecmanović	3	6	4
Q	(Belarus) E Gerasimov	6	1	6

Second round
Q	(Ukraine) I Marchenko	1	7	4
(Australia) J Millman	6	5	6
(Australia) J Duckworth	6	3	1
3	(Russia) K Khachanov	3	6	6
PR	(France) G Simon	6	6
(United States) M McDonald	3	2
Q	(Belarus) E Gerasimov	4	3
2	(Russia) A Karatsev	6	6

Quarterfinals
(Australia) J Millman	5	6^{4}
3	(Russia) K Khachanov	7	7^{7}
PR	(France) G Simon	4	3
2	(Russia) A Karatsev	6	6

Semifinals
3	(Russia) K Khachanov	6^{7}	1
2	(Russia) A Karatsev	7^{9}	6

== Qualifying ==
=== Seeds ===
1. (Belarus) Egor Gerasimov (qualified)
2. (Lithuania) Ričardas Berankis (qualifying competition, lucky loser)
3. (Moldova) Radu Albot (first round)
4. (Bosnia and Herzegovina) Damir Džumhur (qualified)
5. (Austria) Jurij Rodionov (qualifying competition)
6. (Czech Republic) Zdeněk Kolář (qualifying competition)
7. (Australia) Marc Polmans (first round)
8. (Sweden) Elias Ymer (qualifying competition)

=== Qualifiers ===
1. (Belarus) Egor Gerasimov
2. (Croatia) Borna Gojo
3. (Ukraine) Illya Marchenko
4. (Bosnia and Herzegovina) Damir Džumhur

=== Lucky loser ===
1. (Lithuania) Ričardas Berankis

=== Qualifying draw ===
==== First qualifier ====
First round
1	(Belarus) Egor Gerasimov	6	6
(India) Ramkumar Ramanathan	3	4
Alt	(Russia) Pavel Kotov	2	3
8	(Sweden) Elias Ymer	6	6

Qualifying competition
1	(Belarus) Egor Gerasimov	6	1	6
8	(Sweden) Elias Ymer	4	6	2

==== Second qualifier ====
First round
2	(Lithuania) Ričardas Berankis	6	6
(Kazakhstan) Dmitry Popko	4	1
(Croatia) Borna Gojo	7^{7}	6
7	(Australia) Marc Polmans	6^{5}	2

Qualifying competition
2	(Lithuania) Ričardas Berankis	6	5	4
(Croatia) Borna Gojo	4	7	6

==== Third qualifier ====
First round
3	(Moldova) Radu Albot	6^{5}	3
(Ukraine) Illya Marchenko	7^{7}	6
PR	(Uzbekistan) Denis Istomin	4	2
5	(Austria) Jurij Rodionov	6	6

Qualifying competition
(Ukraine) Illya Marchenko	6	6
5	(Austria) Jurij Rodionov	4	1

==== Fourth qualifier ====
First round
4	(Bosnia and Herzegovina) Damir Džumhur	6^{9}	6	6
WC	(Russia) Maxim Zhukov	7^{11}	0	4
WC	(Russia) Yaroslav Demin	4	2
6	(Czech Republic) Zdeněk Kolář	6	6

Qualifying competition
4	(Bosnia and Herzegovina) Damir Džumhur	7	6
6	(Czech Republic) Zdeněk Kolář	5	3
