= 2021 Kremlin Cup – Men's doubles =

Tennis tournament

Men's doubles
- 2021 Kremlin Cup

Final
- Champions: (Finland) Harri Heliövaara (Netherlands) Matwé Middelkoop
- Runners-up: (Bosnia and Herzegovina) Tomislav Brkić (Serbia) Nikola Ćaćić
- Score: 7–5, 4–6, [11–9]

Details
- Draw: 16
- Seeds: 4

Events
Singles	men	women
Doubles	men	women
- Kremlin Cup

Marcelo Demoliner and Matwé Middelkoop were the reigning champions from when the tournament was last held in 2019, but chose to compete with different partners. Demoliner played alongside Marcus Daniell, but lost in the first round to Ariel Behar and Gonzalo Escobar.

Middelkoop teamed up with Harri Heliövaara to successfully defend the title, defeating Tomislav Brkić and Nikola Ćaćić in the final, 7–5, 4–6, [11–9].

== Seeds ==
1. (South Africa) Raven Klaasen / (Japan) Ben McLachlan (first round)
2. (Kazakhstan) Andrey Golubev / (Monaco) Hugo Nys (first round)
3. (Australia) Luke Saville / (Australia) John-Patrick Smith (first round)
4. (Bosnia and Herzegovina) Tomislav Brkić / (Serbia) Nikola Ćaćić (final)

== Draw ==
Key

- Q = Qualifier
- WC = Wild card
- LL = Lucky loser
- Alt = Alternate
- ITF = ITF entry
- PR = Protected ranking
- SR = Special ranking
- SE = Special exempt
- JE = Junior exempt
- JR = Junior Accelerator Programme entrant
- CO = College Accelerator Programme entrant
- NG = Next Gen Accelerator Program entrant
- w/o = Walkover
- r = Retired
- d = Defaulted

=== Draw ===
First round
1	(South Africa) R Klaasen (Japan) B McLachlan	2	4
(India) R Bopanna (Pakistan) A-u-H Qureshi	6	6
PR	(Serbia) L Đere (Argentina) G Pella	5	7^{7}	[6]
(Belarus) I Ivashka (Spain) P Martínez	7	6^{2}	[10]
4	(Bosnia and Herzegovina) T Brkić (Serbia) N Ćaćić	6	6
(Kazakhstan) A Bublik (France) A Mannarino	2	1
WC	(Russia) P Kotov (Russia) R Safiullin	3	4
PR	(United Kingdom) D Inglot (United Kingdom) K Skupski	6	6
(Finland) H Heliövaara (Netherlands) M Middelkoop	6	6
WC	(Russia) A Karatsev (Russia) R Muzaev	4	4
(Russia) K Khachanov (Russia) A Rublev	6	7
3	(Australia) L Saville (Australia) J-P Smith	2	5
(New Zealand) M Daniell (Brazil) M Demoliner	3	7^{7}	[7]
(Uruguay) A Behar (Ecuador) G Escobar	6	6^{3}	[10]
(Mexico) S González (Argentina) A Molteni	7	6^{6}	[10]
2	(Kazakhstan) A Golubev (Monaco) H Nys	5	7^{8}	[7]

Quarterfinals
(India) R Bopanna (Pakistan) A-u-H Qureshi	6^{4}	7	[8]
(Belarus) I Ivashka (Spain) P Martínez	7^{7}	5	[10]
4	(Bosnia and Herzegovina) T Brkić (Serbia) N Ćaćić	7^{7}	5	[10]
PR	(United Kingdom) D Inglot (United Kingdom) K Skupski	6^{4}	7	[8]
(Finland) H Heliövaara (Netherlands) M Middelkoop	6	2	[10]
(Russia) K Khachanov (Russia) A Rublev	4	6	[7]
(Uruguay) A Behar (Ecuador) G Escobar	7	3	[10]
(Mexico) S González (Argentina) A Molteni	5	6	[7]

Semifinals
(Belarus) I Ivashka (Spain) P Martínez	4	6	[8]
4	(Bosnia and Herzegovina) T Brkić (Serbia) N Ćaćić	6	4	[10]
(Finland) H Heliövaara (Netherlands) M Middelkoop	6^{4}	6	[10]
(Uruguay) A Behar (Ecuador) G Escobar	7^{7}	3	[8]

Final
4	(Bosnia and Herzegovina) T Brkić (Serbia) N Ćaćić	5	6	[9]
(Finland) H Heliövaara (Netherlands) M Middelkoop	7	4	[11]
