= 2021 Kremlin Cup – Women's doubles =

Tennis event in Moscow, Russia

Women's doubles
- 2021 Kremlin Cup

Final
- Champions: (Latvia) Jeļena Ostapenko (Czech Republic) Kateřina Siniaková
- Runners-up: (Ukraine) Nadiia Kichenok (Romania) Raluca Olaru
- Score: 6–2, 4–6, [10–8]

Events
Singles	men	women
Doubles	men	women
← 2019 ·	Kremlin Cup	· 2022 →

Shuko Aoyama and Ena Shibahara were the defending champions, having won the previous event in 2019, but chose not to participate.

Jeļena Ostapenko and Kateřina Siniaková won the title, defeating Nadiia Kichenok and Raluca Olaru in the final, 6–2, 4–6, [10–8]. Ostapenko and Siniaková won the title after saving three match points in their quarterfinal match against Viktória Kužmová and Alexandra Panova. This was the first time that Siniaková won a doubles title without regular partner Barbora Krejčíková since January 2019.

== Seeds ==
1. (Chile) Alexa Guarachi / (United States) Desirae Krawczyk (first round)
2. (Latvia) Jeļena Ostapenko / (Czech Republic) Kateřina Siniaková (champions)
3. (Czech Republic) Marie Bouzková / (Czech Republic) Lucie Hradecká (semifinals)
4. (Ukraine) Nadiia Kichenok / (Romania) Raluca Olaru (final)

== Draw ==
=== Key ===
- Q = Qualifier
- WC = Wild card
- LL = Lucky loser
- Alt = Alternate
- ITF = ITF entry
- PR = Protected ranking
- SR = Special ranking
- SE = Special exempt
- JE = Junior exempt
- JR = Junior Accelerator Programme entrant
- CO = College Accelerator Programme entrant
- NG = Next Gen Accelerator Program entrant
- w/o = Walkover
- r = Retired
- d = Defaulted

=== Draw ===
First round
1	(Chile) A Guarachi (United States) D Krawczyk	3	1
(Russia) E Alexandrova (Russia) Y Sizikova	6	6
WC	(Russia) O Selekhmeteva (Russia) A Tikhonova	4	7	[8]
(Russia) N Dzalamidze (Russia) K Rakhimova	6	5	[10]
4	(Ukraine) N Kichenok (Romania) R Olaru	0	6	[10]
(Czech Republic) T Martincová (Czech Republic) M Vondroušová	6	2	[4]
(United States) K Christian (New Zealand) E Routliffe	4	0
(Russia) A Kalinskaya (Russia) A Potapova	6	6
(France) E Lechemia (United States) S Santamaria	1	6	[7]
(Georgia (country)) O Kalashnikova (Japan) M Kato	6	4	[10]
(Kazakhstan) A Danilina (Australia) Ar Rodionova	1	1
3	(Czech Republic) M Bouzková (Czech Republic) L Hradecká	6	6
(Slovakia) V Kužmová (Russia) A Panova	7	6
(Russia) V Diatchenko (Romania) M Niculescu	5	2
PR	(Belarus) V Lapko (Belarus) L Marozava	3	2
2	(Latvia) J Ostapenko (Czech Republic) K Siniaková	6	6

Quarterfinals
(Russia) E Alexandrova (Russia) Y Sizikova	1	6	[7]
(Russia) N Dzalamidze (Russia) K Rakhimova	6	4	[10]
4	(Ukraine) N Kichenok (Romania) R Olaru	5
(Russia) A Kalinskaya (Russia) A Potapova	2^{r}
(Georgia (country)) O Kalashnikova (Japan) M Kato	4	2
3	(Czech Republic) M Bouzková (Czech Republic) L Hradecká	6	6
(Slovakia) V Kužmová (Russia) A Panova	7	3	[9]
2	(Latvia) J Ostapenko (Czech Republic) K Siniaková	5	6	[11]

Semifinals
(Russia) N Dzalamidze (Russia) K Rakhimova	5	5
4	(Ukraine) N Kichenok (Romania) R Olaru	7	7
3	(Czech Republic) M Bouzková (Czech Republic) L Hradecká	2	7	[2]
2	(Latvia) J Ostapenko (Czech Republic) K Siniaková	6	5	[10]

Final
4	(Ukraine) N Kichenok (Romania) R Olaru	2	6	[8]
2	(Latvia) J Ostapenko (Czech Republic) K Siniaková	6	4	[10]
