= 2021 Kremlin Cup – Women's singles =

Women's singles
- 2021 Kremlin Cup

Final
- Champion: (Estonia) Anett Kontaveit
- Runner-up: (Russia) Ekaterina Alexandrova
- Score: 4–6, 6–4, 7–5

Details
- Draw: 28
- Seeds: 8

Events
Singles	men	women
Doubles	men	women
← 2019 ·	Kremlin Cup	· 2022 →

Belinda Bencic was the defending champion, having won the previous edition in 2019, but she withdrew before the tournament began.

Anett Kontaveit won the title, defeating Ekaterina Alexandrova in the final, 4–6, 6–4, 7–5.

== Seeds ==
The top four seeds received a bye into the second round.

1. (Belarus) Aryna Sabalenka (quarterfinals)
2. (Spain) Garbiñe Muguruza (quarterfinals)
3. (Greece) Maria Sakkari (semifinals, retired)
4. (Russia) Anastasia Pavlyuchenkova (quarterfinals)
5. (Tunisia) Ons Jabeur (first round, retired)
6. (Germany) Angelique Kerber (withdrew)
7. (Kazakhstan) Elena Rybakina (first round)
8. (Romania) Simona Halep (quarterfinals)
9. (Estonia) Anett Kontaveit (champion)

== Draw ==
=== Key ===
- Q = Qualifier
- WC = Wild card
- LL = Lucky loser
- Alt = Alternate
- SE = Special exempt
- PR = Protected ranking
- ITF = ITF entry
- JE = Junior exempt
- w/o = Walkover
- r = Retired
- d = Defaulted
- SR = Special ranking

=== Finals ===
Semifinals
(Russia) Ekaterina Alexandrova	4
3	(Greece) Maria Sakkari	1^{r}
(Czech Republic) Markéta Vondroušová	3	4
9/WC	(Estonia) Anett Kontaveit	6	6

Final
(Russia) Ekaterina Alexandrova	6	4	5
9/WC	(Estonia) Anett Kontaveit	4	6	7

=== Top half ===
First round
(Russia) L Samsonova	2	4
(Australia) A Tomljanović	6	6
(Russia) D Kasatkina	2	3
(Ukraine) A Kalinina	6	6
(Russia) E Alexandrova	6	1
5	(Tunisia) O Jabeur	1	0^{r}
(Ukraine) D Yastremska	6^{5}	4
Q	(Russia) A Kalinskaya	7^{7}	6
(Russia) V Kudermetova	4	7^{7}	6
Q	(Russia) O Selekhmeteva	6	6^{3}	4
WC	(Russia) A Potapova	1	4
8/WC	(Romania) S Halep	6	6

Second round
1/WC	(Belarus) A Sabalenka	7^{7}	4	6
(Australia) A Tomljanović	6^{2}	6	1
(Ukraine) A Kalinina	4	1
(Russia) E Alexandrova	6	6
3	(Greece) M Sakkari	6	1
Q	(Russia) A Kalinskaya	2	0^{r}
(Russia) V Kudermetova	1	6^{4}
8/WC	(Romania) S Halep	6	7^{7}

Quarterfinals
1/WC	(Belarus) A Sabalenka	3	4
(Russia) E Alexandrova	6	6
3	(Greece) M Sakkari	6	6
8/WC	(Romania) S Halep	4	4

Semifinals
(Russia) E Alexandrova	4
3	(Greece) M Sakkari	1^{r}

=== Bottom half ===
First round
7	(Kazakhstan) E Rybakina	4	4
(Czech Republic) M Vondroušová	6	6
Q	(China) Q Zheng	4	3
Q	(Ukraine) L Tsurenko	6	6
Q	(Serbia) A Krunić	6^{3}	3
Q	(United States) B Pera	7^{7}	6
9/WC	(Estonia) A Kontaveit	6	6
(Czech Republic) K Siniaková	3	3
(Latvia) J Ostapenko	6	0	0^{r}
(Germany) A Petkovic	2	6	2
LL	(Romania) I Bara	0	5
(Czech Republic) T Martincová	6	7

Second round
(Czech Republic) M Vondroušová	6	6
Q	(Ukraine) L Tsurenko	3	3
Q	(United States) B Pera	2	5
4	(Russia) A Pavlyuchenkova	6	7
9/WC	(Estonia) A Kontaveit	6	6
(Germany) A Petkovic	1	4
(Czech Republic) T Martincová	4	6	3
2	(Spain) G Muguruza	6	4	6

Quarterfinals
(Czech Republic) M Vondroušová	6	6
4	(Russia) A Pavlyuchenkova	4	2
9/WC	(Estonia) A Kontaveit	6	6
2	(Spain) G Muguruza	1	1

Semifinals
(Czech Republic) M Vondroušová	3	4
9/WC	(Estonia) A Kontaveit	6	6

== Qualifying ==
=== Seeds ===
1. (United States) Bernarda Pera (qualified)
2. (Russia) Kamilla Rakhimova (first round)
3. (Romania) Irina Bara (qualifying competition, lucky loser)
4. (Bulgaria) Viktoriya Tomova (first round)
5. (Germany) Anna-Lena Friedsam (qualifying competition)
6. (Russia) Vitalia Diatchenko (qualifying competition)
7. (Russia) Anastasia Gasanova (first round)
8. (Serbia) Aleksandra Krunić (qualified)
9. (Ukraine) Lesia Tsurenko (qualified)
10. (Italy) Lucia Bronzetti (first round)
11. (Russia) Anna Kalinskaya (qualified)
12. (Australia) Arina Rodionova (first round)

=== Qualifiers ===
1. (United States) Bernarda Pera
2. (Russia) Oksana Selekhmeteva
3. (China) Zheng Qinwen
4. (Serbia) Aleksandra Krunić
5. (Ukraine) Lesia Tsurenko
6. (Russia) Anna Kalinskaya

=== Lucky loser ===
1. (Romania) Irina Bara

=== Qualifying draw ===
==== First qualifier ====
First round
1	(United States) Bernarda Pera	6	6
WC	(Russia) Erika Andreeva	2	3
PR	(Belarus) Vera Lapko	6	6
10	(Italy) Lucia Bronzetti	3	1

Qualifying competition
1	(United States) Bernarda Pera	6	6
PR	(Belarus) Vera Lapko	1	4

==== Second qualifier ====
First round
2	(Russia) Kamilla Rakhimova	4	2
WC	(Russia) Diana Shnaider	6	6
WC	(Russia) Oksana Selekhmeteva	6	3	6
12	(Australia) Arina Rodionova	3	6	4

Qualifying competition
WC	(Russia) Diana Shnaider	4	6^{2}
WC	(Russia) Oksana Selekhmeteva	6	7^{7}

==== Third qualifier ====
First round
3	(Romania) Irina Bara	6	6
(Russia) Natalia Vikhlyantseva	2	4
(China) Zheng Qinwen	6	6
7	(Russia) Anastasia Gasanova	4	2

Qualifying competition
3	(Romania) Irina Bara	0	1
(China) Zheng Qinwen	6	6

==== Fourth qualifier ====
First round
4	(Bulgaria) Viktoriya Tomova	6	4	6^{5}
WC	(Russia) Anastasia Tikhonova	4	6	7^{7}
(United Kingdom) Katie Boulter	6^{10}	2
8	(Serbia) Aleksandra Krunić	7^{12}	6

Qualifying competition
WC	(Russia) Anastasia Tikhonova	1	1
8	(Serbia) Aleksandra Krunić	6	6

==== Fifth qualifier ====
First round
5	(Germany) Anna-Lena Friedsam	6	6
(Greece) Valentini Grammatikopoulou	3	0
(Slovakia) Rebecca Šramková	2	5
9	(Ukraine) Lesia Tsurenko	6	7

Qualifying competition
5	(Germany) Anna-Lena Friedsam	1	1
9	(Ukraine) Lesia Tsurenko	6	6

==== Sixth qualifier ====
First round
6/PR	(Russia) Vitalia Diatchenko	6	7
(Georgia (country)) Ekaterine Gorgodze	3	5
(Slovakia) Viktória Kužmová	3	7^{7}	1
11	(Russia) Anna Kalinskaya	6	6^{2}	6

Qualifying competition
6/PR	(Russia) Vitalia Diatchenko	4	2
11	(Russia) Anna Kalinskaya	6	6
