= 2021 Grampians Trophy – Singles =

2021 Grampians Trophy
- Date: 3–7 February
- Edition: 1st
- Category: WTA 500
- Draw: 28S
- Prize money: $235,820
- Surface: Hard
- Location: Melbourne, Australia
- Venue: Melbourne Park

Champions

Singles
- No champion. Final match not played.
Australian Open Series	· 2022 →

The Grampians Trophy was a new addition to the WTA Tour in 2021. This tournament was created for players who had originally intended to participate in the 2021 Yarra Valley Classic or the 2021 Gippsland Trophy, but were forced to undergo strict quarantine measures upon arrival in Australia due to confirmed COVID-19 cases found on several of the chartered player flights to Australia.

Due to a delayed schedule because of a COVID-19 case at a tournament quarantine hotel and the semifinals taking place just one day before the start of the Australian Open, the final was not played. This meant that both the finalists Anett Kontaveit and Ann Li received the finalist's prize money of US$33,520 and the finalist's ranking points of 305 points, not "the prize money they would have pocketed from winning the title outright".

== Seeds ==
1. (Canada) Bianca Andreescu (withdrew)
2. (Switzerland) Belinda Bencic (second round)
3. (Belarus) Victoria Azarenka (quarterfinals, withdrew)
4. (Kazakhstan) Elena Rybakina (second round)
5. (Greece) Maria Sakkari (semifinals)
6. (Estonia) Anett Kontaveit (final)
7. (United States) Jennifer Brady (semifinals)
8. (Germany) Angelique Kerber (quarterfinals)
9. (United States) Alison Riske (withdrew)

== Draw ==
=== Key ===
- Q = Qualifier
- WC = Wild card
- LL = Lucky loser
- Alt = Alternate
- ITF = ITF entry
- PR = Protected ranking
- SR = Special ranking
- SE = Special exempt
- JE = Junior exempt
- JR = Junior Accelerator Programme entrant
- CO = College Accelerator Programme entrant
- NG = Next Gen Accelerator Program entrant
- w/o = Walkover
- r = Retired
- d = Defaulted

=== Finals ===
Semifinals
5	(Greece) Maria Sakkari	6	3	[9]
6	(Estonia) Anett Kontaveit	2	6	[11]
7	(United States) Jennifer Brady	6^{5}	7^{7}	[6]
(United States) Ann Li	7^{7}	6^{5}	[10]

Final
6	(Estonia) Anett Kontaveit
(United States) Ann Li

Final not played due to schedule delays. Both Kontaveit and Li received the runners-up points (305) and prize money (US$33,520).

=== Top half ===
First round
(Canada) LA Fernandez	6	6
(United States) S Stephens	3	1
(Tunisia) O Jabeur	6	6
(Russia) A Blinkova	1	1
(Czech Republic) K Siniaková	3	6	3
8	(Germany) A Kerber	6	4	6
(Kazakhstan) Y Putintseva	7^{7}	6
(Spain) G García Pérez	6^{1}	4
(Czech Republic) B Strýcová	6^{3}	2
(United States) B Mattek-Sands	7^{7}	6
(United States) C McHale	1	3
6	(Estonia) A Kontaveit	6	6

Second round
5	(Greece) M Sakkari	6	6
(Canada) LA Fernandez	2	2
(Tunisia) O Jabeur	4	4
8	(Germany) A Kerber	6	6
3	(Belarus) V Azarenka	6	1	[11]
(Kazakhstan) Y Putintseva	4	6	[9]
(United States) B Mattek-Sands	5	5
6	(Estonia) A Kontaveit	7	7

Quarterfinals
5	(Greece) M Sakkari	6	6
8	(Germany) A Kerber	4	2
3	(Belarus) V Azarenka
6	(Estonia) A Kontaveit	w/o

Semifinals
5	(Greece) M Sakkari	6	3	[9]
6	(Estonia) A Kontaveit	2	6	[11]

=== Bottom half ===
First round
7	(United States) J Brady	6	6
(Russia) S Kuznetsova	3	0
(Canada) G Dabrowski	0	3
(Ukraine) M Kostyuk	6	6
(United States) L Davis	4	6	4
(Czech Republic) B Krejčíková	6	4	6
Alt	(Australia) E Perez	3^{r}
(United States) A Li	5
(United Kingdom) H Watson	2	2
(Russia) V Kudermetova	6	6
(Romania) S Cîrstea	6	6
Alt	(Georgia (country)) O Kalashnikova	1	1

Second round
7	(United States) J Brady	6	6
(Ukraine) M Kostyuk	1	4
(Czech Republic) B Krejčíková	4	6	[10]
4	(Kazakhstan) E Rybakina	6	2	[6]
(United States) A Li	7	6
(Russia) V Kudermetova	5	3
(Romania) S Cîrstea	7	6
2	(Switzerland) B Bencic	5	2

Quarterfinals
7	(United States) J Brady	7^{7}	6
(Czech Republic) B Krejčíková	6^{5}	4
(United States) A Li	6	6
(Romania) S Cîrstea	3	1

Semifinals
7	(United States) J Brady	6^{5}	7^{7}	[6]
(United States) A Li	7^{7}	6^{5}	[10]
