= 2021 Yarra Valley Classic =

- Date: 31 January – 7 February
- Edition: 1st
- Category: WTA 500
- Draw: 54S / 28D
- Prize money: $447,620
- Surface: Hard
- Location: Melbourne, Australia
- Venue: Melbourne Park

Champions

Singles
- (Australia) Ashleigh Barty

Doubles
- (Japan) Shuko Aoyama / (Japan) Ena Shibahara
- Australian Open Series

The 2021 Yarra Valley Classic was a tournament on the 2021 WTA Tour, one of six events in the 2021 Melbourne Summer Series. It was played on outdoor hard courts in Melbourne, Australia. It was organised as a lead-up tournament to the 2021 Australian Open, and was held at the same venue, due to other tournaments in Australia being cancelled as a result from the COVID-19 pandemic. This tournament took place simultaneously with the 2021 Gippsland Trophy and the 2021 Grampians Trophy. Players who had originally intended to participate in this tournament or the Gippsland Trophy, but were forced to undergo strict quarantine measures upon arrival in Australia, were able to participate in the 2021 Grampians Trophy. The entry list of 2021 Australian Open was used to determine the entry list of this tournament; with half the players (selected randomly) playing the Yarra Valley Classic, and the other half playing the 2021 Gippsland Trophy.

In the women's singles final, Ashleigh Barty defeated Garbiñe Muguruza in straight sets, while Shuko Aoyama and Ena Shibahara won in women's doubles.

== Champions ==
=== Singles ===
- (Australia) Ashleigh Barty def. (Spain) Garbiñe Muguruza 7–6^{(7–3)}, 6–4

=== Doubles ===
- (Japan) Shuko Aoyama / (Japan) Ena Shibahara def. (Russia) Anna Kalinskaya / (Slovakia) Viktória Kužmová, 6–3, 6–4

== Singles main-draw entrants ==
=== Seeds ===
Country	Player	Rank^{1}	Seed
AUS	Ashleigh Barty	1	1
USA	Sofia Kenin	4	2
CZE	Karolína Plíšková	6	3
CZE	Petra Kvitová	9	4
USA	Serena Williams	11	5
ESP	Garbiñe Muguruza	15	6
CRO	Petra Martić	18	7
CZE	Markéta Vondroušová	21	8
CRO	Donna Vekić	32	9
~~CHN~~	~~Zhang Shuai~~	~~35~~	~~10~~
RUS	Anastasia Pavlyuchenkova	39	11
FRA	Fiona Ferro	43	12
USA	Danielle Collins	46	13
ARG	Nadia Podoroska	47	14
FRA	Kristina Mladenovic	50	15
CZE	Marie Bouzková	52	16

- ^{1} Rankings are as of 25 January 2021

=== Other entrants ===
The following players received wildcards into the main draw:

- (Australia) Kimberly Birrell
- (Australia) Lizette Cabrera
- (Australia) Daria Gavrilova
- (Australia) Maddison Inglis

The following players received entry using a protected ranking into the Australian Open singles main draw, and hence this tournament as well:

- (Germany) Mona Barthel
- (Kazakhstan) Yaroslava Shvedova
- (China) Zhu Lin
- (Russia) Vera Zvonareva

The following players received entry from the Australian Open qualifying draw:

- (France) Clara Burel
- (Italy) Elisabetta Cocciaretto
- (Serbia) Olga Danilović
- (United Kingdom) Francesca Jones
- (Belgium) Greet Minnen
- (Bulgaria) Tsvetana Pironkova
- (Russia) Liudmila Samsonova
- (Egypt) Mayar Sherif

The following players received entry into this tournament as they were potential lucky losers for the Australian Open singles main draw:

- (Belgium) Ysaline Bonaventure
- (India) Ankita Raina
- (Russia) Kamilla Rakhimova

The following players received entry as an alternate:

- (United States) Caroline Dolehide
- (Belarus) Vera Lapko

=== Withdrawals ===
Before the tournament

- (Belgium) Kirsten Flipkens → replaced by (Belarus) Vera Lapko
- (China) Zhang Shuai → replaced by (United States) Caroline Dolehide

During the tournament

- (United States) Serena Williams

=== Retirements ===
- (Italy) Camila Giorgi

== Doubles main-draw entrants ==
=== Seeds ===
Country	Player	Country	Player	Rank^{1}	Seed
~~HUN~~	~~Tímea Babos~~	~~FRA~~	~~Kristina Mladenovic~~	~~7~~	~~1~~
USA	Nicole Melichar	NED	Demi Schuurs	23	2
JPN	Shuko Aoyama	JPN	Ena Shibahara	38	3
CHN	Duan Yingying	CHN	Zheng Saisai	47	4
CHI	Alexa Guarachi	USA	Desirae Krawczyk	51	5
CHN	Xu Yifan	CHN	Yang Zhaoxuan	64	6
UKR	Lyudmyla Kichenok	LAT	Jeļena Ostapenko	67	7
AUS	Ashleigh Barty	USA	Jennifer Brady	80	8

- Rankings are as of 25 January 2021

=== Other entrants ===
The following pairs received a wildcard into the doubles main draw:

- (Australia) Lizette Cabrera / (Australia) Maddison Inglis
- (Australia) Jaimee Fourlis / (Australia) Charlotte Kempenaers-Pocz
- (Australia) Olivia Gadecki / (Australia) Belinda Woolcock

The following pair received entry as alternates:

- (Canada) Leylah Annie Fernandez / (Russia) Anastasia Potapova
- (Montenegro) Danka Kovinić / (Italy) Jasmine Paolini
- (Serbia) Aleksandra Krunić / (Italy) Martina Trevisan

=== Withdrawals ===
Before the tournament

- (Hungary) Tímea Babos / (France) Kristina Mladenovic → replaced by (Canada) Leylah Annie Fernandez / (Russia) Anastasia Potapova
- (Japan) Misaki Doi / (Japan) Nao Hibino → replaced by (Serbia) Aleksandra Krunić / (Italy) Martina Trevisan
- (Russia) Anastasia Pavlyuchenkova / (Latvia) Anastasija Sevastova → replaced by (Montenegro) Danka Kovinić / (Italy) Jasmine Paolini

During the tournament

- (Ukraine) Marta Kostyuk / (Belarus) Aliaksandra Sasnovich

=== Retirements ===
- (Czech Republic) Karolína Muchová / (Czech Republic) Markéta Vondroušová

== Points and prize money ==
=== Point distribution ===
Event	W	F	SF	QF	Round of 16	Round of 32	Round of 64
Singles	470	305	185	100	55	30	1
Doubles	470	305	185	100	55	1	—N/a

=== Prize money ===
Event	W	F	SF	QF	Round of 16	Round of 32	Round of 64
Singles	$50,000	$33,520	$18,610	$8,770	$5,500	$4,250	$3,000
Doubles*	$20,890	$13,370	$8,350	$4,310	$2,670	$2,020	—N/a

_{*per team}

== See also ==
Other events in the 2021 Melbourne Summer Series:

- 2021 Phillip Island Trophy
- 2021 Grampians Trophy
- 2021 Great Ocean Road Open
- 2021 Murray River Open
- 2021 Gippsland Trophy
