= 2021 Grampians Trophy =

WTA tennis tournament in Melbourne

- Date: 3–7 February
- Edition: 1st
- Category: WTA 500
- Draw: 28S
- Prize money: $235,820
- Surface: Hard
- Location: Melbourne, Australia
- Venue: Melbourne Park

Champions

Singles
- No champion. Final match not played.
Australian Open Series	· 2022 →

The 2021 Grampians Trophy was a tournament on the 2021 WTA Tour. It was played on outdoor hardcourts in Melbourne, Australia. It was organised as a lead-up tournament to the 2021 Australian Open, and was held at the same venue, due to other tournaments in Australia being cancelled due to the COVID-19 pandemic. This tournament was created for players who had originally intended to participate in the 2021 Yarra Valley Classic or the 2021 Gippsland Trophy, but were forced to undergo strict quarantine measures upon arrival in Australia due to confirmed COVID-19 cases found on several of the chartered player flights to Australia. There was no doubles event.

Due to a delayed schedule because of a COVID-19 case at a tournament quarantine hotel and the semifinals taking place just one day before the start of the Australian Open, the final was not played.

== Champions ==
=== Singles ===
- (Estonia) Anett Kontaveit vs. (United States) Ann Li
- Final not held due to delay in schedule. Both finalists received the points and prize money reserved for runners-up finishes: 305 points and $33,520.

== Points and prize money ==
=== Point distribution ===
Event	W	F	SF	QF	Round of 16	Round of 32
Singles	470	305	185	100	55	1

=== Prize money ===
Event	W	F	SF	QF	Round of 16	Round of 32
Singles	$50,000	$33,520	$18,610	$8,770	$5,500	$3,000

_{*per team}

== Singles main-draw entrants ==
=== Seeds ===
Country	Player	Rank^{1}	Seed
~~CAN~~	~~Bianca Andreescu~~	~~8~~	~~1~~
SUI	Belinda Bencic	12	2
BLR	Victoria Azarenka	13	3
KAZ	Elena Rybakina	19	4
GRE	Maria Sakkari	22	5
EST	Anett Kontaveit	23	6
USA	Jennifer Brady	24	7
GER	Angelique Kerber	25	8
~~USA~~	~~Alison Riske~~	~~26~~	~~9~~

- ^{1} Rankings are as of 25 January 2021

=== Other entrants ===
The following players received entry as an alternate:

- (Georgia (country)) Oksana Kalashnikova
- (Australia) Ellen Perez

=== Withdrawals ===
before the tournament

- (Canada) Bianca Andreescu → replaced by (Georgia (country)) Oksana Kalashnikova
- (Spain) Paula Badosa → replaced by (United States) Bethanie Mattek-Sands
- (United States) Alison Riske → replaced by (Australia) Ellen Perez
- (Ukraine) Dayana Yastremska → replaced by (Canada) Gabriela Dabrowski

during the tournament

- (Belarus) Victoria Azarenka
