= 2021 Yarra Valley Classic – Doubles =

Doubles
- 2021 Yarra Valley Classic

Final
- Champions: (Japan) Shuko Aoyama (Japan) Ena Shibahara
- Runners-up: (Russia) Anna Kalinskaya (Slovakia) Viktória Kužmová
- Score: 6–3, 6–4

Events
Singles	Doubles
Australian Open Series	· 2022 →

This was the first edition of the tournament. Shuko Aoyama and Ena Shibahara won the title, defeating Anna Kalinskaya and Viktória Kužmová in the final, 6–3, 6–4.

== Seeds ==
1. (Hungary) Tímea Babos / (France) Kristina Mladenovic (withdrew)
2. (United States) Nicole Melichar / (Netherlands) Demi Schuurs (semifinals)
3. (Japan) Shuko Aoyama / (Japan) Ena Shibahara (champions)
4. (China) Duan Yingying / (China) Zheng Saisai (semifinals)
5. (Chile) Alexa Guarachi / (United States) Desirae Krawczyk (first round)
6. (China) Xu Yifan / (China) Yang Zhaoxuan (second round)
7. (Ukraine) Lyudmyla Kichenok / (Latvia) Jeļena Ostapenko (first round)
8. (Australia) Ashleigh Barty / (United States) Jennifer Brady (quarterfinals)

== Draw ==
=== Key ===
- Q = Qualifier
- WC = Wild card
- LL = Lucky loser
- Alt = Alternate
- SE = Special exempt
- PR = Protected ranking
- ITF = ITF entry
- JE = Junior exempt
- w/o = Walkover
- r = Retired
- d = Defaulted
- SR = Special ranking

=== Finals ===
Semifinals
(Russia) Anna Kalinskaya (Slovakia) Viktória Kužmová	0	6	[10]
4	(China) Duan Yingying (China) Zheng Saisai	6	2	[5]
3	(Japan) Shuko Aoyama (Japan) Ena Shibahara	6^{5}	7	[13]
2	(United States) Nicole Melichar (Netherlands) Demi Schuurs	7^{7}	5	[11]

Final
(Russia) Anna Kalinskaya (Slovakia) Viktória Kužmová	3	4
3	(Japan) Shuko Aoyama (Japan) Ena Shibahara	6	6

=== Top half ===
First round
Alt	(Serbia) A Krunić (Italy) M Trevisan	7^{7}	6
(United States) B Pera (Sweden) R Peterson	6^{1}	2
(Netherlands) A Rus (Slovenia) T Zidanšek	6	6
(Romania) A Mitu (Romania) R Olaru	3	4
(Russia) A Kalinskaya (Slovakia) V Kužmová	4	6	[10]
5	(Chile) A Guarachi (United States) D Krawczyk	6	4	[5]
WC	(Australia) O Gadecki (Australia) B Woolcock	6	7
WC	(Australia) J Fourlis (Australia) C Kempenaers-Pocz	3	5
(Ukraine) M Kostyuk (Belarus) A Sasnovich	6	3	[10]
(United States) A Muhammad (United States) J Pegula	2	6	[8]
Alt	(Montenegro) D Kovinić (Italy) J Paolini	4	4
6	(China) Y Xu (China) Z Yang	6	6

Second round
Alt	(Canada) LA Fernandez (Russia) A Potapova	7	5	[10]
Alt	(Serbia) A Krunić (Italy) M Trevisan	5	7	[4]
(Netherlands) A Rus (Slovenia) T Zidanšek	5	6	[8]
(Russia) A Kalinskaya (Slovakia) V Kužmová	7	4	[10]
4	(China) Y Duan (China) S Zheng	3	7^{7}	[11]
WC	(Australia) O Gadecki (Australia) B Woolcock	6	6^{2}	[9]
(Ukraine) M Kostyuk (Belarus) A Sasnovich	5	6	[10]
6	(China) Y Xu (China) Z Yang	7	4	[6]

Quarterfinals
Alt	(Canada) LA Fernandez (Russia) A Potapova	3	4
(Russia) A Kalinskaya (Slovakia) V Kužmová	6	6
4	(China) Y Duan (China) S Zheng	w/o
(Ukraine) M Kostyuk (Belarus) A Sasnovich

Semifinals
(Russia) A Kalinskaya (Slovakia) V Kužmová	0	6	[10]
4	(China) Y Duan (China) S Zheng	6	2	[5]

=== Bottom half ===
First round
7	(Ukraine) L Kichenok (Latvia) J Ostapenko	3	4
(United States) C Gauff (United States) C McNally	6	6
(Czech Republic) K Muchová (Czech Republic) M Vondroušová	6	6
WC	(Australia) L Cabrera (Australia) M Inglis	3	3
(India) A Raina (Netherlands) R van der Hoek	7^{7}	6
(Sweden) C Lister (Belgium) A Van Uytvanck	6^{5}	4
8	(Australia) A Barty (United States) J Brady	7^{7}	6
(Canada) S Fichman (Mexico) G Olmos	6^{2}	1
(Tunisia) O Jabeur (United States) C McHale	6	3	[10]
(Greece) M Sakkari (Croatia) D Vekić	1	6	[5]
(France) F Ferro (Switzerland) J Teichmann	6	6
(United States) S Santamaria (Russia) Y Sizikova	1	3

Second round
(United States) C Gauff (United States) C McNally	6	0
(Czech Republic) K Muchová (Czech Republic) M Vondroušová	2	0^{r}
(India) A Raina (Netherlands) R van der Hoek	2	6^{2}
3	(Japan) S Aoyama (Japan) E Shibahara	6	7^{7}
8	(Australia) A Barty (United States) J Brady	6	6
(Tunisia) O Jabeur (United States) C McHale	2	3
(France) F Ferro (Switzerland) J Teichmann	6^{1}	2
2	(United States) N Melichar (Netherlands) D Schuurs	7^{7}	6

Quarterfinals
(United States) C Gauff (United States) C McNally	3	6	[7]
3	(Japan) S Aoyama (Japan) E Shibahara	6	3	[10]
8	(Australia) A Barty (United States) J Brady	5	4
2	(United States) N Melichar (Netherlands) D Schuurs	7	6

Semifinals
3	(Japan) S Aoyama (Japan) E Shibahara	6^{5}	7	[13]
2	(United States) N Melichar (Netherlands) D Schuurs	7^{7}	5	[11]
