= 2021 Gippsland Trophy – Doubles =

Doubles
- 2021 Gippsland Trophy

Final
- Champions: (Czech Republic) Barbora Krejčíková (Czech Republic) Kateřina Siniaková
- Runners-up: (Chinese Taipei) Chan Hao-ching (Chinese Taipei) Latisha Chan
- Score: 6–3, 7–6^{(7–4)}

Events
Singles	Doubles
Australian Open Series	· 2022 →

The Gippsland Trophy was a new addition to the WTA Tour in 2021.

Barbora Krejčíková and Kateřina Siniaková won the title, defeating Chan Hao-ching and Latisha Chan in the final, 6–3, 7–6^{(7–4)}.

== Seeds ==
1. (Czech Republic) Barbora Krejčíková / (Czech Republic) Kateřina Siniaková (champions)
2. (Chinese Taipei) Chan Hao-ching / (Chinese Taipei) Latisha Chan (final)
3. (Canada) Gabriela Dabrowski / (United States) Bethanie Mattek-Sands (second round)
4. (Slovenia) Andreja Klepač / (Belgium) Elise Mertens (second round)
5. (Australia) Samantha Stosur / (China) Zhang Shuai (first round)
6. (United States) Hayley Carter / (Brazil) Luisa Stefani (second round)
7. (Germany) Laura Siegemund / (Russia) Vera Zvonareva (quarterfinals)
8. (Russia) Anna Blinkova / (Russia) Veronika Kudermetova (semifinals)

== Draw ==
=== Key ===
- Q = Qualifier
- WC = Wild card
- LL = Lucky loser
- Alt = Alternate
- SE = Special exempt
- PR = Protected ranking
- ITF = ITF entry
- JE = Junior exempt
- w/o = Walkover
- r = Retired
- d = Defaulted
- SR = Special ranking

=== Finals ===
Semifinals
1	(Czech Republic) Barbora Krejčíková (Czech Republic) Kateřina Siniaková	7	6
(Romania) Mihaela Buzărnescu (France) Alizé Cornet	5	2
8	(Russia) Anna Blinkova (Russia) Veronika Kudermetova	2	6	[9]
2	(Chinese Taipei) Chan Hao-ching (Chinese Taipei) Latisha Chan	6	3	[11]

Final
1	(Czech Republic) Barbora Krejčíková (Czech Republic) Kateřina Siniaková	6	7^{7}
2	(Chinese Taipei) Chan Hao-ching (Chinese Taipei) Latisha Chan	3	6^{4}

=== Top half ===
First round
(Ukraine) K Bondarenko (Ukraine) N Kichenok	4	6	[7]
WC	(Australia) D Aiava (Australia) A Sharma	6	4	[10]
(United States) C Dolehide (United States) S Rogers	7	1	[7]
(Spain) L Arruabarrena (United States) K Christian	5	6	[10]
(Romania) I-C Begu (China) Q Wang	2	3
7	(Germany) L Siegemund (Russia) V Zvonareva	6	6
(Switzerland) B Bencic (Czech Republic) B Strýcová	2	2
WC	(Australia) D Gavrilova (Romania) S Halep	6	6
(Romania) M Buzărnescu (France) A Cornet	6	2	[10]
(Japan) M Ninomiya (Czech Republic) R Voráčová	4	6	[2]
(Czech Republic) L Hradecká (Czech Republic) Kr Plíšková	1	6^{4}
6	(United States) H Carter (Brazil) L Stefani	6	7^{7}

Second round
1	(Czech Republic) B Krejčíková (Czech Republic) K Siniaková	6	2	[10]
WC	(Australia) D Aiava (Australia) A Sharma	4	6	[8]
(Spain) L Arruabarrena (United States) K Christian	6^{5}	2
7	(Germany) L Siegemund (Russia) V Zvonareva	7^{7}	6
3	(Canada) G Dabrowski (United States) B Mattek-Sands	6^{4}	6	[2]
WC	(Australia) D Gavrilova (Romania) S Halep	7^{7}	2	[10]
(Romania) M Buzărnescu (France) A Cornet	6	6
6	(United States) H Carter (Brazil) L Stefani	3	1

Quarterfinals
1	(Czech Republic) B Krejčíková (Czech Republic) K Siniaková	3	6	[10]
7	(Germany) L Siegemund (Russia) V Zvonareva	6	1	[6]
WC	(Australia) D Gavrilova (Romania) S Halep
(Romania) M Buzărnescu (France) A Cornet	w/o

Semifinals
1	(Czech Republic) B Krejčíková (Czech Republic) K Siniaková	7	6
(Romania) M Buzărnescu (France) A Cornet	5	2

=== Bottom half ===
First round
8	(Russia) A Blinkova (Russia) V Kudermetova	6	2	[10]
(United States) A Riske (Australia) A Tomljanović	1	6	[7]
WC	(Australia) A Myers (Australia) I Popovic	6	6
(Spain) G García Pérez (Georgia (country)) O Kalashnikova	1	2
(Romania) M Niculescu (Romania) PM Țig	5	7^{7}	[10]
(France) C Garcia (Argentina) N Podoroska	7	6^{3}	[6]
5	(Australia) S Stosur (China) S Zhang	6^{5}	3
(Australia) Ar Rodionova (Australia) S Sanders	7^{7}	6
PR	(Germany) M Barthel (China) L Zhu	2	4
(Czech Republic) M Bouzková (Spain) S Sorribes Tormo	6	6
(Croatia) D Jurak (Serbia) N Stojanović	6	6
(Kazakhstan) E Rybakina (Kazakhstan) Y Shvedova	4	2

Second round
8	(Russia) A Blinkova (Russia) V Kudermetova	6	6
WC	(Australia) A Myers (Australia) I Popovic	4	1
(Romania) M Niculescu (Romania) PM Țig	6	6
4	(Slovenia) A Klepač (Belgium) E Mertens	3	3
(Australia) Ar Rodionova (Australia) S Sanders	5	6	[8]
(Czech Republic) M Bouzková (Spain) S Sorribes Tormo	7	2	[10]
(Croatia) D Jurak (Serbia) N Stojanović	3	5
2	(Chinese Taipei) H-c Chan (Chinese Taipei) L Chan	6	7

Quarterfinals
8	(Russia) A Blinkova (Russia) V Kudermetova	2	6	[10]
(Romania) M Niculescu (Romania) PM Țig	6	2	[8]
(Czech Republic) M Bouzková (Spain) S Sorribes Tormo	4	4
2	(Chinese Taipei) H-c Chan (Chinese Taipei) L Chan	6	6

Semifinals
8	(Russia) A Blinkova (Russia) V Kudermetova	2	6	[9]
2	(Chinese Taipei) H-c Chan (Chinese Taipei) L Chan	6	3	[11]
