= 2021 Murray River Open – Singles =

Singles
- 2021 Murray River Open

Final
- Champion: (United Kingdom) Dan Evans
- Runner-up: (Canada) Félix Auger-Aliassime
- Score: 6–2, 6–3

Events
Singles	Doubles
- Australian Open Series

Dan Evans defeated Félix Auger-Aliassime in the final, 6–2, 6–3 to win the inaugural singles tennis title at the 2021 Murray River Open. It was his first ATP Tour title. The final marked Auger-Aliassime's seventh career runner-up finish from seven ATP Tour finals appearances.

== Seeds ==
The top eight seeds received a bye into the second round.

1. (Switzerland) Stan Wawrinka (quarterfinals, withdrew)
2. (Bulgaria) Grigor Dimitrov (quarterfinals)
3. (Canada) Félix Auger-Aliassime (final)
4. (Croatia) Borna Ćorić (quarterfinals)
5. (Norway) Casper Ruud (second round)
6. (United States) Taylor Fritz (third round)
7. (France) Ugo Humbert (second round)
8. (United Kingdom) Dan Evans (champion)

9. (Italy) Lorenzo Sonego (first round)
10. (France) Adrian Mannarino (second round)
11. (Croatia) Marin Čilić (first round)
12. (Spain) Albert Ramos Viñolas (second round)
13. (Australia) Nick Kyrgios (third round)
14. (France) Richard Gasquet (first round)
15. (United States) Tommy Paul (second round)
16. (Hungary) Márton Fucsovics (second round)

Click on the seed number of a player to go to their draw section.

== Draw ==
Key

- Q = Qualifier
- WC = Wild card
- LL = Lucky loser
- Alt = Alternate
- ITF = ITF entry
- PR = Protected ranking
- SR = Special ranking
- SE = Special exempt
- JE = Junior exempt
- JR = Junior Accelerator Programme entrant
- CO = College Accelerator Programme entrant
- NG = Next Gen Accelerator Program entrant
- w/o = Walkover
- r = Retired
- d = Defaulted

=== Finals ===
Quarterfinals
1	(Switzerland) Stan Wawrinka
(France) Jérémy Chardy	w/o
4	(Croatia) Borna Ćorić	5	6^{1}
8	(United Kingdom) Dan Evans	7	7^{7}
(Czech Republic) Jiří Veselý	6^{3}	0^{r}
3	(Canada) Félix Auger-Aliassime	7^{7}	0
(France) Corentin Moutet	7	6
2	(Bulgaria) Grigor Dimitrov	5	2

Semifinals
(France) Jérémy Chardy	2	2
8	(United Kingdom) Dan Evans	6	6
3	(Canada) Félix Auger-Aliassime	6	6
(France) Corentin Moutet	1	2

Final
8	(United Kingdom) Dan Evans	6	6
3	(Canada) Félix Auger-Aliassime	2	3

=== Top half ===
==== Section 1 ====
First round
(Argentina) JI Londero	6	5	2
(Kazakhstan) M Kukushkin	4	7	6
PR	(Australia) T Kokkinakis	6	4	3
(Australia) A Bolt	2	6	6
(United States) M McDonald	7^{7}	7
14	(France) R Gasquet	6^{2}	5
11	(Croatia) M Čilić	6	3	6^{8}
(France) J Chardy	2	6	7^{10}
(Sweden) E Ymer	4	4
(France) G Simon	6	6
(Moldova) R Albot	6^{3}	4
(Argentina) F Coria	7^{7}	6

Second round
1	(Switzerland) S Wawrinka	4	6	6
(Kazakhstan) M Kukushkin	6	3	1
(Australia) A Bolt	6	6^{7}	7
(United States) M McDonald	4	7^{9}	5
(France) J Chardy	6	6
(France) G Simon	3	4
(Argentina) F Coria	2	1
6	(United States) T Fritz	6	6

Third round
1	(Switzerland) S Wawrinka	6	4	7^{7}
(Australia) A Bolt	4	6	6^{5}
(France) J Chardy	6	6
6	(United States) T Fritz	2	4

Quarterfinals
1	(Switzerland) S Wawrinka
(France) J Chardy	w/o

==== Section 2 ====
First round
(Serbia) V Troicki	3	4
(Finland) E Ruusuvuori	6	6
Alt	(Australia) H Bourchier	6	6
(Australia) M Polmans	4	4
(France) A Müller	6	4	6^{4}
13	(Australia) N Kyrgios	3	6	7^{7}
10	(France) A Mannarino	7	6
(Sweden) M Ymer	5	2
(United States) M Giron	6	7
(United States) M Mmoh	1	5
(Portugal) P Sousa	6	7^{7}
WC	(Australia) L Tu	4	6^{5}

Second round
4	(Croatia) B Ćorić	7	6
(Finland) E Ruusuvuori	5	4
Alt	(Australia) H Bourchier	2	6^{7}
13	(Australia) N Kyrgios	6	7^{9}
10	(France) A Mannarino	3	4
(United States) M Giron	6	6
(Portugal) P Sousa	3	5
8	(United Kingdom) D Evans	6	7

Third round
4	(Croatia) B Ćorić	6	6
13	(Australia) N Kyrgios	3	4
(United States) M Giron	4	6^{4}
8	(United Kingdom) D Evans	6	7^{7}

Quarterfinals
4	(Croatia) B Ćorić	5	6^{1}
8	(United Kingdom) D Evans	7	7^{7}

=== Bottom half ===
==== Section 3 ====
First round
(Portugal) F Ferreira Silva	4	4
(Czech Republic) J Veselý	6	6
(India) S Nagal	2	2
(Lithuania) R Berankis	6	6
WC	(Australia) J Kubler	3	6	6
9	(Italy) L Sonego	6	3	4
16	(Hungary) M Fucsovics	7^{10}	6
(Italy) M Cecchinato	6^{8}	3
(Belarus) E Gerasimov	6	7
(South Africa) L Harris	3	5
(Japan) Y Sugita	3	7^{7}	7
(France) Q Halys	6	6^{3}	5

Second round
5	(Norway) C Ruud	7	6^{4}	3
(Czech Republic) J Veselý	5	7^{7}	6
(Lithuania) R Berankis	7^{7}	7
WC	(Australia) J Kubler	6^{2}	5
16	(Hungary) M Fucsovics	3	6	3
(Belarus) E Gerasimov	6	1	6
(Japan) Y Sugita	3	1
3	(Canada) F Auger-Aliassime	6	6

Third round
(Czech Republic) J Veselý	6	6
(Lithuania) R Berankis	4	2
(Belarus) E Gerasimov	6	3	6^{6}
3	(Canada) F Auger-Aliassime	3	6	7^{8}

Quarterfinals
(Czech Republic) J Veselý	6^{3}	0^{r}
3	(Canada) F Auger-Aliassime	7^{7}	0

==== Section 4 ====
First round
(Australia) J Duckworth	6	6
(Czech Republic) T Macháč	3	4
(United States) F Tiafoe	6	4	4
(France) C Moutet	3	6	6
WC	(Australia) B Mott	2	4
12	(Spain) A Ramos Viñolas	6	6
15	(United States) T Paul	4	7^{7}	6
(United Kingdom) C Norrie	6	6^{2}	3
(Croatia) B Gojo	7^{10}	6^{2}	6^{7}
(Australia) A Popyrin	6^{8}	7^{7}	7^{9}
WC	(Australia) A Harris	5	6	7
(Japan) T Daniel	7	4	5

Second round
7	(France) U Humbert	6^{6}	4
(Australia) J Duckworth	7^{8}	6
(France) C Moutet	6	6
12	(Spain) A Ramos Viñolas	4	4
15	(United States) T Paul	4	3
(Australia) A Popyrin	6	6
WC	(Australia) A Harris	3	3
2	(Bulgaria) G Dimitrov	6	6

Third round
(Australia) J Duckworth	6^{4}	4
(France) C Moutet	7^{7}	6
(Australia) A Popyrin	4	7^{7}	3
2	(Bulgaria) G Dimitrov	6	6^{5}	6

Quarterfinals
(France) C Moutet	7	6
2	(Bulgaria) G Dimitrov	5	2
