= 2021 Great Ocean Road Open – Singles =

Singles
- 2021 Great Ocean Road Open

Final
- Champion: (Italy) Jannik Sinner
- Runner-up: (Italy) Stefano Travaglia
- Score: 7–6^{(7–4)}, 6–4

Details
- Draw: 48
- Seeds: 16

Events
Singles	Doubles
- Australian Open Series

The Great Ocean Road Open was a new addition to the ATP Tour in 2021.

Jannik Sinner won the title, defeating Stefano Travaglia in the final, 7–6^{(7–4)}, 6–4. He saved a match point against Karen Khachanov in the semifinal.

== Seeds ==
The top eight seeds received a bye into the second round.

1. (Belgium) David Goffin (second round)
2. (Russia) Karen Khachanov (semifinals)
3. (Poland) Hubert Hurkacz (quarterfinals)
4. (Italy) Jannik Sinner (champion)
5. (Georgia (country)) Nikoloz Basilashvili (second round)
6. (United States) Reilly Opelka (third round)
7. (Serbia) Miomir Kecmanović (quarterfinals)
8. (Kazakhstan) Alexander Bublik (third round)
9. (United States) Tennys Sandgren (second round)
10. (United States) Sam Querrey (second round)
11. (Australia) Jordan Thompson (quarterfinals)
12. (Serbia) Laslo Đere (first round)
13. (Slovenia) Aljaž Bedene (third round)
14. (Spain) Pablo Andújar (first round)
15. (Canada) Vasek Pospisil (withdrew)
16. (Spain) Feliciano López (first round)

Click on the seed number of a player to go to their draw section.

== Draw ==
Key

- Q = Qualifier
- WC = Wild card
- LL = Lucky loser
- Alt = Alternate
- ITF = ITF entry
- PR = Protected ranking
- SR = Special ranking
- SE = Special exempt
- JE = Junior exempt
- JR = Junior Accelerator Programme entrant
- CO = College Accelerator Programme entrant
- NG = Next Gen Accelerator Program entrant
- w/o = Walkover
- r = Retired
- d = Defaulted

=== Finals ===
Quarterfinals
(Brazil) Thiago Monteiro	6	6
11	(Australia) Jordan Thompson	4	4
3	(Poland) Hubert Hurkacz	6	3	5
(Italy) Stefano Travaglia	3	6	7
7	(Serbia) Miomir Kecmanović	6^{10}	4
4	(Italy) Jannik Sinner	7^{12}	6
(Netherlands) Botic van de Zandschulp	7^{8}	5	3
2	(Russia) Karen Khachanov	6^{6}	7	6

Semifinals
(Brazil) Thiago Monteiro	3	4
(Italy) Stefano Travaglia	6	6
4	(Italy) Jannik Sinner	7^{7}	4	7^{7}
2	(Russia) Karen Khachanov	6^{4}	6	6^{4}

Final
(Italy) Stefano Travaglia	6^{4}	4
4	(Italy) Jannik Sinner	7^{7}	6

=== Top half ===
==== Section 1 ====
First round
(Spain) C Alcaraz	2
(Hungary) A Balázs	2^{r}
Alt	(Australia) M Ebden	6	7^{8}
(Argentina) F Delbonis	3	6^{6}
(Brazil) T Monteiro	6	6
Alt	(Australia) T Fancutt	4	4
11	(Australia) J Thompson	4	6	6
(Italy) G Mager	6	4	3
(United States) M Cressy	7^{7}	6^{2}	5
(France) P-H Herbert	6^{2}	7^{7}	7
(Germany) Y Hanfmann	6^{2}	4
(Spain) M Vilella Martínez	7^{7}	6

Second round
1	(Belgium) D Goffin	3	3
(Spain) C Alcaraz	6	6
Alt	(Australia) M Ebden	7^{7}	4	3
(Brazil) T Monteiro	6^{4}	6	6
11	(Australia) J Thompson	6	3	6
(France) P-H Herbert	4	6	3
(Spain) M Vilella Martínez	7	6
5	(Georgia (country)) N Basilashvili	5	3

Third round
(Spain) C Alcaraz	6^{3}	3
(Brazil) T Monteiro	7^{7}	6
11	(Australia) J Thompson	6	6
(Spain) M Vilella Martínez	4	4

Quarterfinals
(Brazil) T Monteiro	6	6
11	(Australia) J Thompson	4	4

==== Section 2 ====
First round
(Denmark) M Torpegaard	6	7
(Spain) P Martínez	4	5
(Belgium) K Coppejans	4	3
(Netherlands) R Haase	6	6
(Uruguay) P Cuevas	6	6
14	(Spain) P Andújar	4	2
10	(United States) S Querrey	4	7^{7}	6
(Switzerland) H Laaksonen	6	6^{5}	0
(Spain) R Carballés Baena	6	5	6^{2}
(Italy) S Travaglia	2	7	7^{7}
(Germany) D Koepfer	7	4	1
(Australia) C O'Connell	5	6	6

Second round
3	(Poland) H Hurkacz	6	6
(Denmark) M Torpegaard	4	3
(Netherlands) R Haase	5	3
(Uruguay) P Cuevas	7	6
10	(United States) S Querrey	7^{9}	3	4
(Italy) S Travaglia	6^{7}	6	6
(Australia) C O'Connell	6^{2}	7^{8}	4
8	(Kazakhstan) A Bublik	7^{7}	6^{6}	6

Third round
3	(Poland) H Hurkacz	7	7
(Uruguay) P Cuevas	5	5
(Italy) S Travaglia	6	7
8	(Kazakhstan) A Bublik	1	5

Quarterfinals
3	(Poland) H Hurkacz	6	3	5
(Italy) S Travaglia	3	6	7

=== Bottom half ===
==== Section 3 ====
First round
(Slovakia) A Martin	3	7^{7}	6^{4}
(South Korea) S-w Kwon	6	6^{5}	7^{7}
(Italy) A Seppi	5	6^{5}
(Italy) S Caruso	7	7^{7}
WC	(Australia) J-P Smith	3	7	4
9	(United States) T Sandgren	6	5	6
13	(Slovenia) A Bedene	7^{7}	7^{7}
(Japan) Y Uchiyama	6^{5}	6^{5}
Alt	(South Korea) J-s Nam	6^{4}	5
WC	(Australia) D Sweeny	7^{7}	7
PR	(Chinese Taipei) Y-h Lu	4	5
(Australia) A Vukic	6	7

Second round
7	(Serbia) M Kecmanović	6	6
(South Korea) S-w Kwon	3	4
(Italy) S Caruso	6	6^{2}	6
9	(United States) T Sandgren	4	7^{7}	1
13	(Slovenia) A Bedene	6	6
WC	(Australia) D Sweeny	0	4
(Australia) A Vukic	2	4
4	(Italy) J Sinner	6	6

Third round
7	(Serbia) M Kecmanović	7^{7}	5	7
(Italy) S Caruso	6^{5}	7	5
13	(Slovenia) A Bedene	6^{6}	2
4	(Italy) J Sinner	7^{8}	6

Quarterfinals
7	(Serbia) M Kecmanović	6^{10}	4
4	(Italy) J Sinner	7^{12}	6

==== Section 4 ====
First round
(Russia) R Safiullin	7^{7}	4	3
(Ukraine) S Stakhovsky	6^{5}	6	6
(Netherlands) B van de Zandschulp	6	7
WC	(Australia) T Schoolkate	4	5
PR	(Poland) K Majchrzak	6	6
12	(Serbia) L Đere	3	4
16	(Spain) F López	4	5
(South Africa) K Anderson	6	7
(Bolivia) H Dellien	4	4
(Germany) C-M Stebe	6	6
(Slovakia) N Gombos	4	4
WC	(Australia) M Purcell	6	6

Second round
6	(United States) R Opelka	7^{10}	6
(Ukraine) S Stakhovsky	6^{8}	4
(Netherlands) B van de Zandschulp	6	3	6
PR	(Poland) K Majchrzak	4	6	4
(South Africa) K Anderson	6	6
(Germany) C-M Stebe	4	2
WC	(Australia) M Purcell	6^{5}	3
2	(Russia) K Khachanov	7^{7}	6

Third round
6	(United States) R Opelka	6^{6}	6^{4}
(Netherlands) B van de Zandschulp	7^{8}	7^{7}
(South Africa) K Anderson	3	6^{5}
2	(Russia) K Khachanov	6	7^{7}

Quarterfinals
(Netherlands) B van de Zandschulp	7^{8}	5	3
2	(Russia) K Khachanov	6^{6}	7	6
