= 2021 Murray River Open – Doubles =

Doubles
- 2021 Murray River Open

Final
- Champions: (Croatia) Nikola Mektić (Croatia) Mate Pavić
- Runners-up: (France) Jérémy Chardy (France) Fabrice Martin
- Score: 7–6^{(7–2)}, 6–3

Events
Singles	Doubles
- Australian Open Series

The Murray River Open was a new addition to the ATP Tour in 2021.

Top seeds Nikola Mektić and Mate Pavić won the title, defeating Jérémy Chardy and Fabrice Martin in the final, 7–6^{(7–2)}, 6–3.

== Seeds ==
1. (Croatia) Nikola Mektić / (Croatia) Mate Pavić (champions)
2. (Netherlands) Wesley Koolhof / (Poland) Łukasz Kubot (quarterfinals)
3. (United States) Rajeev Ram / (United Kingdom) Joe Salisbury (second round)
4. (Brazil) Marcelo Melo / (Romania) Horia Tecău (quarterfinals)
5. (France) Jérémy Chardy / (France) Fabrice Martin (final)
6. (Belgium) Sander Gillé / (Belgium) Joran Vliegen (quarterfinals)
7. (United Kingdom) Ken Skupski / (United Kingdom) Neal Skupski (second round)
8. (Brazil) Marcelo Demoliner / (Mexico) Santiago González (semifinals)

== Draw ==
Key

- Q = Qualifier
- WC = Wild card
- LL = Lucky loser
- Alt = Alternate
- ITF = ITF entry
- PR = Protected ranking
- SR = Special ranking
- SE = Special exempt
- JE = Junior exempt
- JR = Junior Accelerator Programme entrant
- CO = College Accelerator Programme entrant
- NG = Next Gen Accelerator Program entrant
- w/o = Walkover
- r = Retired
- d = Defaulted

=== Finals ===
Semifinals
1	(Croatia) Nikola Mektić (Croatia) Mate Pavić	6^{4}	7	[10]
(Uruguay) Ariel Behar (Ecuador) Gonzalo Escobar	7^{7}	5	[7]
8	(Brazil) Marcelo Demoliner (Mexico) Santiago González	6^{4}	7^{7}	[8]
5	(France) Jérémy Chardy (France) Fabrice Martin	7^{7}	6^{2}	[10]

Final
1	(Croatia) Nikola Mektić (Croatia) Mate Pavić	7^{7}	6
5	(France) Jérémy Chardy (France) Fabrice Martin	6^{2}	3

=== Top half ===
First round
(Bosnia and Herzegovina) T Brkić (Pakistan) A-u-H Qureshi	6	6
(Italy) M Cecchinato (Italy) L Sonego	4	2
(Argentina) A Molteni (Monaco) H Nys	4	2
PR	(United States) M McDonald (United States) T Paul	6	6
(Australia) N Kyrgios (Australia) M Reid	5	4
(United States) N Monroe (United States) F Tiafoe	7	6
WC	(Australia) A Harris (Australia) A Popyrin	1	2
(Uruguay) A Behar (Ecuador) G Escobar	6	6

Second round
1	(Croatia) N Mektić (Croatia) M Pavić	7^{7}	2	[10]
(Bosnia and Herzegovina) T Brkić (Pakistan) A-u-H Qureshi	6^{5}	6	[7]
PR	(United States) M McDonald (United States) T Paul	4	7^{7}	[8]
6	(Belgium) S Gillé (Belgium) J Vliegen	6	6^{4}	[10]
4	(Brazil) M Melo (Romania) H Tecău	7^{8}	6
(United States) N Monroe (United States) F Tiafoe	6^{6}	2
(Uruguay) A Behar (Ecuador) G Escobar	7^{7}	4	[10]
7	(United Kingdom) K Skupski (United Kingdom) N Skupski	6^{4}	6	[7]

Quarterfinals
1	(Croatia) N Mektić (Croatia) M Pavić	7^{7}	3	[10]
6	(Belgium) S Gillé (Belgium) J Vliegen	6^{4}	6	[6]
4	(Brazil) M Melo (Romania) H Tecău	6^{4}	3
(Uruguay) A Behar (Ecuador) G Escobar	7^{7}	6

Semifinals
1	(Croatia) N Mektić (Croatia) M Pavić	6^{4}	7	[10]
(Uruguay) A Behar (Ecuador) G Escobar	7^{7}	5	[7]

=== Bottom half ===
First round
(India) R Bopanna (Denmark) F Nielsen	4	3
WC	(Australia) J Duckworth (Australia) M Polmans	6	6
(United Kingdom) C Norrie (United Kingdom) J O'Mara	6	6
(Lithuania) R Berankis (Kazakhstan) M Kukushkin	3	4
(Argentina) G Durán (Spain) A Ramos Viñolas	6	3	[8]
(India) D Sharan (Slovakia) I Zelenay	4	6	[10]
Alt	(Australia) H Bourchier (Australia) J Kubler	1	6	[6]
(Moldova) R Albot (Belarus) E Gerasimov	6	4	[10]

Second round
8	(Brazil) M Demoliner (Mexico) S González	6	6
WC	(Australia) J Duckworth (Australia) M Polmans	4	2
(United Kingdom) C Norrie (United Kingdom) J O'Mara	4	6	[10]
3	(United States) R Ram (United Kingdom) J Salisbury	6	3	[7]
5	(France) J Chardy (France) F Martin	7^{7}	6
(India) D Sharan (Slovakia) I Zelenay	6^{5}	4
(Moldova) R Albot (Belarus) E Gerasimov	2	6	[7]
2	(Netherlands) W Koolhof (Poland) Ł Kubot	6	3	[10]

Quarterfinals
8	(Brazil) M Demoliner (Mexico) S González	4	7	[10]
(United Kingdom) C Norrie (United Kingdom) J O'Mara	6	5	[3]
5	(France) J Chardy (France) F Martin	7^{10}	6
2	(Netherlands) W Koolhof (Poland) Ł Kubot	6^{8}	3

Semifinals
8	(Brazil) M Demoliner (Mexico) S González	6^{4}	7^{7}	[8]
5	(France) J Chardy (France) F Martin	7^{7}	6^{2}	[10]
