= 2021 Great Ocean Road Open – Doubles =

Doubles
- 2021 Great Ocean Road Open

Final
- Champions: (United Kingdom) Jamie Murray (Brazil) Bruno Soares
- Runners-up: (Colombia) Juan Sebastián Cabal (Colombia) Robert Farah
- Score: 6–3, 7–6^{(9–7)}

Events
Singles	Doubles
← 2020 ·	Australian Open Series	· 2022 →

The Great Ocean Road Open was a new addition to the ATP Tour in 2021.

Jamie Murray and Bruno Soares won the title, defeating Juan Sebastián Cabal and Robert Farah in the final, 6–3, 7–6^{(9–7)}.

== Seeds ==
1. (Colombia) Juan Sebastián Cabal / (Colombia) Robert Farah (final)
2. (United Kingdom) Jamie Murray / (Brazil) Bruno Soares (champions)
3. (Croatia) Ivan Dodig / (Slovakia) Filip Polášek (semifinals)
4. (France) Pierre-Hugues Herbert / (Finland) Henri Kontinen (second round)
5. (New Zealand) Marcus Daniell / (New Zealand) Michael Venus (quarterfinals)
6. (El Salvador) Marcelo Arévalo / (Netherlands) Matwé Middelkoop (quarterfinals)
7. (United Kingdom) Luke Bambridge / (United Kingdom) Dominic Inglot (second round)
8. (Kazakhstan) Alexander Bublik / (Kazakhstan) Andrey Golubev (quarterfinals)

== Draw ==
=== Key ===
- Q = Qualifier
- WC = Wild card
- LL = Lucky loser
- Alt = Alternate
- SE = Special exempt
- PR = Protected ranking
- ITF = ITF entry
- JE = Junior exempt
- w/o = Walkover
- r = Retired
- d = Defaulted
- SR = Special ranking

=== Finals ===
Semifinals
1	(Colombia) Juan Sebastián Cabal (Colombia) Robert Farah	6	6
(Australia) Matthew Ebden (Australia) John-Patrick Smith	4	4
3	(Croatia) Ivan Dodig (Slovakia) Filip Polášek	2	6^{0}
2	(United Kingdom) Jamie Murray (Brazil) Bruno Soares	6	7^{7}

Final
1	(Colombia) Juan Sebastián Cabal (Colombia) Robert Farah	3	6^{7}
2	(United Kingdom) Jamie Murray (Brazil) Bruno Soares	6	7^{9}

=== Top half ===
First round
(Australia) M Purcell (Australia) J Thompson	6	5
(Georgia (country)) N Basilashvili (Germany) A Begemann	4	4^{r}
WC	(Netherlands) R Haase (United States) S Querrey	6	2
Alt	(Australia) T Schoolkate (Australia) D Sweeny	4	1^{r}
(Poland) H Hurkacz (Italy) J Sinner	6	6
(Australia) S Puodziunas (Australia) C Puttergill	3	3
(Australia) M Ebden (Australia) J-P Smith	7^{7}	6
WC	(Australia) C O'Connell (Australia) A Vukic	6^{5}	4

Second round
1	(Colombia) JS Cabal (Colombia) R Farah	w/o
(Australia) M Purcell (Australia) J Thompson
WC	(Netherlands) R Haase (United States) S Querrey	4	4
6	(El Salvador) M Arévalo (Netherlands) M Middelkoop	6	6
4	(France) P-H Herbert (Finland) H Kontinen	1	4
(Poland) H Hurkacz (Italy) J Sinner	6	6
(Australia) M Ebden (Australia) J-P Smith	6	6
7	(United Kingdom) L Bambridge (United Kingdom) D Inglot	4	4

Quarterfinals
1	(Colombia) JS Cabal (Colombia) R Farah	6	6
6	(El Salvador) M Arévalo (Netherlands) M Middelkoop	3	4
(Poland) H Hurkacz (Italy) J Sinner
(Australia) M Ebden (Australia) J-P Smith	w/o

Semifinals
1	(Colombia) JS Cabal (Colombia) R Farah	6	6
(Australia) M Ebden (Australia) J-P Smith	4	4

=== Bottom half ===
First round
(Argentina) F Delbonis (New Zealand) A Sitak	6^{6}	6	[10]
(Germany) D Koepfer (United States) T Sandgren	7^{8}	3	[8]
Alt	(Spain) R Carballés Baena (Uruguay) P Cuevas	3	6	[10]
(South Korea) J-s Nam (South Korea) M-k Song	6	3	[4]
(Serbia) M Kecmanović (Russia) K Khachanov	2	6	[10]
(Monaco) R Arneodo (Italy) S Caruso	6	4	[3]
(Serbia) L Đere (Italy) S Travaglia	5	3
(Spain) P Andújar (Spain) P Martínez	7	6

Second round
5	(New Zealand) M Daniell (New Zealand) M Venus	7^{8}	6
(Argentina) F Delbonis (New Zealand) A Sitak	6^{6}	2
Alt	(Spain) R Carballés Baena (Uruguay) P Cuevas	7	4	[7]
3	(Croatia) I Dodig (Slovakia) F Polášek	5	6	[10]
8	(Kazakhstan) A Bublik (Kazakhstan) A Golubev	w/o
(Serbia) M Kecmanović (Russia) K Khachanov
(Spain) P Andújar (Spain) P Martínez	6^{4}	3
2	(United Kingdom) J Murray (Brazil) B Soares	7^{7}	6

Quarterfinals
5	(New Zealand) M Daniell (New Zealand) M Venus	2	3
3	(Croatia) I Dodig (Slovakia) F Polášek	6	6
8	(Kazakhstan) A Bublik (Kazakhstan) A Golubev	4	6	[7]
2	(United Kingdom) J Murray (Brazil) B Soares	6	4	[10]

Semifinals
3	(Croatia) I Dodig (Slovakia) F Polášek	2	6^{0}
2	(United Kingdom) J Murray (Brazil) B Soares	6	7^{7}
