= 2021 Phillip Island Trophy – Doubles =

Doubles
- 2021 Phillip Island Trophy

Final
- Champions: (India) Ankita Raina (Russia) Kamilla Rakhimova
- Runners-up: (Russia) Anna Blinkova (Russia) Anastasia Potapova
- Score: 2–6, 6–4, [10–7]

Events
Singles	Doubles
Australian Open Series	· 2022 →

The Phillip Island Trophy was a new addition to the WTA Tour in 2021.

Ankita Raina and Kamilla Rakhimova won the title, defeating Anna Blinkova and Anastasia Potapova in the final, 2–6, 6–4, [10–7].

== Seeds ==
1. (Chinese Taipei) Chan Hao-ching / (Chinese Taipei) Latisha Chan (quarterfinals)
2. (Romania) Monica Niculescu / (China) Yang Zhaoxuan (second round)
3. (United States) Kaitlyn Christian / (United States) Sabrina Santamaria (second round)
4. (Romania) Andreea Mitu / (Romania) Raluca Olaru (second round)
5. (Georgia (country)) Oksana Kalashnikova / (Sweden) Cornelia Lister (second round)
6. (Belgium) Kirsten Flipkens / (Belgium) Greet Minnen (second round)
7. (Japan) Makoto Ninomiya / (China) Wang Yafan (semifinals)
8. (Japan) Misaki Doi / (Japan) Nao Hibino (first round, withdrew)

== Draw ==
=== Key ===
- Q = Qualifier
- WC = Wild card
- LL = Lucky loser
- Alt = Alternate
- SE = Special exempt
- PR = Protected ranking
- ITF = ITF entry
- JE = Junior exempt
- w/o = Walkover
- r = Retired
- d = Defaulted
- SR = Special ranking

=== Finals ===
Semifinals
7	(Japan) Makoto Ninomiya (China) Wang Yafan	4	3
(Russia) Anna Blinkova (Russia) Anastasia Potapova	6	6
(India) Ankita Raina (Russia) Kamilla Rakhimova	4	6	[11]
(United Kingdom) Francesca Jones (Argentina) Nadia Podoroska	6	4	[9]

Final
(Russia) Anna Blinkova (Russia) Anastasia Potapova	6	4	[7]
(India) Ankita Raina (Russia) Kamilla Rakhimova	2	6	[10]

=== Top half ===
First round
(United States) C McHale (Russia) V Savinykh	6	6
(Russia) Y Sizikova (Czech Republic) R Voráčová	3	2
(Czech Republic) M Bouzková (Spain) S Sorribes Tormo
(Australia) K Birrell (Australia) O Gadecki	w/o
(Russia) A Blinkova (Russia) A Potapova	6	6
(Australia) L Cabrera (Australia) M Inglis	1	1
(United States) M Brengle (United States) L Davis	4	0
(Ukraine) K Bondarenko (Ukraine) N Kichenok	6	6

Second round
1	(Chinese Taipei) H-c Chan (Chinese Taipei) L Chan	7^{7}	6
(United States) C McHale (Russia) V Savinykh	6^{5}	4
(Australia) K Birrell (Australia) O Gadecki
7	(Japan) M Ninomiya (China) Y Wang	w/o
4	(Romania) A Mitu (Romania) R Olaru	6^{8}	6^{3}
(Russia) A Blinkova (Russia) A Potapova	7^{10}	7^{7}
(Ukraine) K Bondarenko (Ukraine) N Kichenok	7	7
6	(Belgium) K Flipkens (Belgium) G Minnen	5	5

Quarterfinals
1	(Chinese Taipei) H-c Chan (Chinese Taipei) L Chan	3	6^{6}
7	(Japan) M Ninomiya (China) Y Wang	6	7^{8}
(Russia) A Blinkova (Russia) A Potapova	6	7
(Ukraine) K Bondarenko (Ukraine) N Kichenok	2	5

Semifinals
7	(Japan) M Ninomiya (China) Y Wang	4	3
(Russia) A Blinkova (Russia) A Potapova	6	6

=== Bottom half ===
First round
(Romania) M Buzărnescu (Romania) PM Țig	1	6^{3}
(India) A Raina (Russia) K Rakhimova	6	7^{7}
(Belarus) V Lapko (Belarus) A Sasnovich	6	6
WC	(Australia) D Aiava (Australia) C Kempenaers-Pocz	0	4
8	(Japan) M Doi (Japan) N Hibino
(Australia) G Da Silva-Fick (India) P Yadlapalli	w/o
(Australia) A Osborne (Australia) A Sharma	2	4
(Croatia) P Martić (Latvia) A Sevastova	6	6
(United Kingdom) F Jones (Argentina) N Podoroska	6	6
(Italy) E Cocciaretto (United States) A Muhammad	4	3

Second round
5	(Georgia (country)) O Kalashnikova (Sweden) C Lister	3	4
(India) A Raina (Russia) K Rakhimova	6	6
(Belarus) V Lapko (Belarus) A Sasnovich	6	6
3	(United States) K Christian (United States) S Santamaria	4	3
(Australia) G Da Silva-Fick (India) P Yadlapalli	3	6	[6]
(Croatia) P Martić (Latvia) A Sevastova	6	2	[10]
(United Kingdom) F Jones (Argentina) N Podoroska	6	4	[10]
2	(Romania) M Niculescu (China) Z Yang	4	6	[8]

Quarterfinals
(India) A Raina (Russia) K Rakhimova	6	7^{7}
(Belarus) V Lapko (Belarus) A Sasnovich	4	6^{2}
(Croatia) P Martić (Latvia) A Sevastova	3	2
(United Kingdom) F Jones (Argentina) N Podoroska	6	6

Semifinals
(India) A Raina (Russia) K Rakhimova	4	6	[11]
(United Kingdom) F Jones (Argentina) N Podoroska	6	4	[9]
