= 2021 Gippsland Trophy – Singles =

Singles
- 2021 Gippsland Trophy

Final
- Champion: (Belgium) Elise Mertens
- Runner-up: (Estonia) Kaia Kanepi
- Score: 6–4, 6–1

Events
Singles	Doubles
- Australian Open Series

The Gippsland Trophy was a new addition to the WTA Tour in 2021.

Elise Mertens won the title, defeating Kaia Kanepi in the final, 6–4, 6–1.

Due to a delayed schedule caused by a COVID-19 case at a tournament quarantine hotel, all matches from the quarterfinals onward used a match tiebreaker in the final set (first to ten points, win by two).

== Seeds ==
The top ten seeds received a bye into the second round.

1. (Romania) Simona Halep (quarterfinals)
2. (Japan) Naomi Osaka (semifinals, withdrew)
3. (Ukraine) Elina Svitolina (quarterfinals)
4. (Belarus) Aryna Sabalenka (second round)
5. (United Kingdom) Johanna Konta (third round)
6. (Poland) Iga Świątek (third round)
7. (Belgium) Elise Mertens (champion)
8. (Czech Republic) Karolína Muchová (quarterfinals, withdrew)
9. (Russia) Ekaterina Alexandrova (semifinals)
10. (China) Wang Qiang (second round)
11. (China) Zheng Saisai (first round)
12. (France) Caroline Garcia (third round)
13. (Latvia) Jeļena Ostapenko (third round)
14. (United States) Coco Gauff (second round)
15. (Slovenia) Polona Hercog (second round)
16. (Germany) Laura Siegemund (third round)

Click on the seed number of a player to go to their draw section.

== Draw ==
Key

- Q = Qualifier
- WC = Wild card
- LL = Lucky loser
- Alt = Alternate
- ITF = ITF entry
- PR = Protected ranking
- SR = Special ranking
- SE = Special exempt
- JE = Junior exempt
- JR = Junior Accelerator Programme entrant
- CO = College Accelerator Programme entrant
- NG = Next Gen Accelerator Program entrant
- w/o = Walkover
- r = Retired
- d = Defaulted

=== Finals ===
Quarterfinals
1	(Romania) Simona Halep	2	1
9	(Russia) Ekaterina Alexandrova	6	6
(Estonia) Kaia Kanepi	w/o
8	(Czech Republic) Karolína Muchová
7	(Belgium) Elise Mertens	6	5	[10]
3	(Ukraine) Elina Svitolina	3	7	[6]
(Romania) Irina-Camelia Begu	5	1
2	(Japan) Naomi Osaka	7	6

Semifinals
9	(Russia) Ekaterina Alexandrova	3	6^{6}
(Estonia) Kaia Kanepi	6	7^{8}
7	(Belgium) Elise Mertens	w/o
2	(Japan) Naomi Osaka

Final
(Estonia) Kaia Kanepi	4	1
7	(Belgium) Elise Mertens	6	6

=== Top half ===
==== Section 1 ====
First round
(United States) W Osuigwe	3	0
PR	(Russia) A Potapova	6	6
WC	(Australia) D Aiava	6	4	6
(France) C Paquet	1	6	4
Alt	(Romania) M Niculescu	5	4
16	(Germany) L Siegemund	7	6
(Slovakia) AK Schmiedlová	6	6
(Russia) V Savinykh	1	3
(Slovenia) K Juvan	4	6	6
PR	(China) Y Wang	6	1	4

Second round
1	(Romania) S Halep	6	6
PR	(Russia) A Potapova	4	4
WC	(Australia) D Aiava	2	2
16	(Germany) L Siegemund	6	6
9	(Russia) E Alexandrova	4	6	6
(Slovakia) AK Schmiedlová	6	4	2
(Slovenia) K Juvan	6	2	1
6	(Poland) I Świątek	2	6	6

Third round
1	(Romania) S Halep	6	6
16	(Germany) L Siegemund	2	4
9	(Russia) E Alexandrova	6	6
6	(Poland) I Świątek	4	2

Quarterfinals
1	(Romania) S Halep	2	1
9	(Russia) E Alexandrova	6	6

==== Section 2 ====
First round
WC	(Australia) A Sharma	6	5	2
(Estonia) K Kanepi	1	7	6
(Romania) M Buzărnescu	1	1
(Russia) D Kasatkina	6	6
(Russia) M Gasparyan	6	3	3
15	(Slovenia) P Hercog	2	6	6
(Italy) J Paolini	7^{7}	6
PR	(Canada) R Marino	6^{2}	3
Alt	(United States) C McNally	6	6^{3}	6
(Spain) S Sorribes Tormo	2	7^{7}	3

Second round
4	(Belarus) A Sabalenka	1	6	1
(Estonia) K Kanepi	6	2	6
(Russia) D Kasatkina	6	6
15	(Slovenia) P Hercog	4	3
10	(China) Q Wang	6	5	4
(Italy) J Paolini	3	7	6
Alt	(United States) C McNally	1	1
8	(Czech Republic) K Muchová	6	6

Third round
(Estonia) K Kanepi	7	6
(Russia) D Kasatkina	5	1
(Italy) J Paolini	2	6	4
8	(Czech Republic) K Muchová	6	4	6

Quarterfinals
(Estonia) K Kanepi	w/o
8	(Czech Republic) K Muchová

=== Bottom half ===
==== Section 3 ====
First round
(United States) V Lepchenko	4	7^{7}	1
(Japan) M Hibi	6	6^{3}	6
(Romania) PM Țig	6^{5}	3
(Hungary) T Babos	7^{7}	6
WC	(Australia) Ar Rodionova	3	4
12	(France) C Garcia	6	6
13	(Latvia) J Ostapenko	4	6	6
(Italy) S Errani	6	3	1
(Montenegro) D Kovinić	6	6
(Slovenia) T Zidanšek	3	3
(Italy) M Trevisan	1	6	5
(Germany) A Petkovic	6	3	7

Second round
7	(Belgium) E Mertens	6	6
(Japan) M Hibi	2	2
(Hungary) T Babos	4	4
12	(France) C Garcia	6	6
13	(Latvia) J Ostapenko	6	7
(Montenegro) D Kovinić	4	5
(Germany) A Petkovic	1	4
3	(Ukraine) E Svitolina	6	6

Third round
7	(Belgium) E Mertens	7^{7}	6
12	(France) C Garcia	6^{1}	3
13	(Latvia) J Ostapenko	7^{7}	3	2
3	(Ukraine) E Svitolina	6^{4}	6	6

Quarterfinals
7	(Belgium) E Mertens	6	5	[10]
3	(Ukraine) E Svitolina	3	7	[6]

==== Section 4 ====
First round
(United States) B Pera	6^{2}	6	6
WC	(Australia) O Gadecki	7^{7}	3	3
(Ukraine) L Tsurenko	6	4	4
(Belarus) A Sasnovich	3	6	6
(Romania) I-C Begu	3	7	6
11	(China) S Zheng	6	5	4
14	(United States) C Gauff	6	6^{6}	7^{7}
(Switzerland) J Teichmann	3	7^{8}	6^{5}
(Russia) A Kalinskaya	1	3
PR	(United Kingdom) K Boulter	6	6
(France) A Cornet	5	6	6
(Australia) A Tomljanović	7	1	3

Second round
5	(United Kingdom) J Konta	6	6
(United States) B Pera	2	3
(Belarus) A Sasnovich	7	4	4
(Romania) I-C Begu	5	6	6
14	(United States) C Gauff	6	5	2
PR	(United Kingdom) K Boulter	3	7	6
(France) A Cornet	2	2
2	(Japan) N Osaka	6	6

Third round
5	(United Kingdom) J Konta	6	6^{10}	6^{4}
(Romania) I-C Begu	4	7^{12}	7^{7}
PR	(United Kingdom) K Boulter	6	3	1
2	(Japan) N Osaka	3	6	6

Quarterfinals
(Romania) I-C Begu	5	1
2	(Japan) N Osaka	7	6
