= 2021 Phillip Island Trophy – Singles =

Singles
- 2021 Phillip Island Trophy

Final
- Champion: (Russia) Daria Kasatkina
- Runner-up: (Czech Republic) Marie Bouzková
- Score: 4–6, 6–2, 6–2

Details
- Draw: 56
- Seeds: 16

Events
Singles	Doubles
Australian Open Series	· 2022 →

The Phillip Island Trophy was a new addition to the WTA Tour in 2021.

Daria Kasatkina won the title, defeating Marie Bouzková in the final, 4–6, 6–2, 6–2.

== Seeds ==
The top eight seeds received a bye into the second round.

1. (United States) Sofia Kenin (second round)
2. (Canada) Bianca Andreescu (semifinals)
3. (United Kingdom) Johanna Konta (withdrew)
4. (Croatia) Petra Martić (quarterfinals)
5. (China) Wang Qiang (third round)
6. (China) Zhang Shuai (withdrew)
7. (Russia) Anastasia Pavlyuchenkova (third round)
8. (United States) Danielle Collins (semifinals)

9. (United States) Sloane Stephens (first round)
10. (France) Caroline Garcia (first round)
11. (China) Zheng Saisai (first round)
12. (Argentina) Nadia Podoroska (first round)
13. (Czech Republic) Marie Bouzková (final)
14. (Latvia) Anastasija Sevastova (first round)
15. (France) Alizé Cornet (first round)
16. (Sweden) Rebecca Peterson (quarterfinals)

== Draw ==
=== Key ===
- Q = Qualifier
- WC = Wild card
- LL = Lucky loser
- Alt = Alternate
- SE = Special exempt
- PR = Protected ranking
- ITF = ITF entry
- JE = Junior exempt
- w/o = Walkover
- r = Retired
- d = Defaulted
- SR = Special ranking

=== Finals ===
Quarterfinals
16	(Sweden) Rebecca Peterson	1	2
8	(United States) Danielle Collins	6	6
4	(Croatia) Petra Martić	0	4
(Russia) Daria Kasatkina	6	6
(Switzerland) Jil Teichmann	3	6	2
13	(Czech Republic) Marie Bouzková	6	4	6
(Romania) Irina-Camelia Begu	3	6	6^{5}
2/WC	(Canada) Bianca Andreescu	6	4	7^{7}

Semifinals
8	(United States) Danielle Collins	2	7^{8}	1
(Russia) Daria Kasatkina	6	6^{6}	6
13	(Czech Republic) Marie Bouzková	6^{9}	6	7
2/WC	(Canada) Bianca Andreescu	7^{11}	2	5

Final
(Russia) Daria Kasatkina	4	6	6
13	(Czech Republic) Marie Bouzková	6	2	2

=== Top half ===
==== Section 1 ====
First round
WC	(Australia) O Gadecki	6	6
WC	(Australia) D Aiava	4	4
(Belgium) G Minnen	6	6
(Hungary) T Babos	2	2
(Russia) A Potapova	4	6	3
16	(Sweden) R Peterson	6	4	6
10	(France) C Garcia	5	3
(Japan) M Doi	7	6
(Spain) S Sorribes Tormo	6^{6}	6	7^{7}
(Russia) L Samsonova	7^{8}	1	6^{4}
Q	(United States) V Lepchenko	6	3
(Japan) N Hibino	3	0^{r}

Second round
1/WC	(United States) S Kenin	6	6^{4}	4
WC	(Australia) O Gadecki	2	7^{7}	6
(Belgium) G Minnen	5	3
16	(Sweden) R Peterson	7	6
(Japan) M Doi	w/o
(Spain) S Sorribes Tormo
Q	(United States) V Lepchenko	7^{7}	1	3
8	(United States) D Collins	6^{3}	6	6

Third round
WC	(Australia) O Gadecki	5	3
16	(Sweden) R Peterson	7	6
(Japan) M Doi	4	2
8	(United States) D Collins	6	6

Quarterfinals
16	(Sweden) R Peterson	1	2
8	(United States) D Collins	6	6

==== Section 2 ====
First round
Q	(Germany) M Barthel	4	3
Q	(Canada) R Marino	6	6
(Italy) E Cocciaretto	7	1	2
Q	(India) A Raina	5	6	6
WC	(Australia) K Birrell	6	7
15	(France) A Cornet	2	5
9	(United States) S Stephens	2	2
(Russia) V Gracheva	6	6
(Russia) D Kasatkina	6	6
PR	(United Kingdom) K Boulter	4	2
Q	(Australia) L Cabrera	3	4
(Australia) A Tomljanović	6	6

Second round
4	(Croatia) P Martić	6	5	6
Q	(Canada) R Marino	2	7	4
Q	(India) A Raina	3	6	4
WC	(Australia) K Birrell	6	3	6
(Russia) V Gracheva	4	3
(Russia) D Kasatkina	6	6
(Australia) A Tomljanović	7	4	2
7	(Russia) A Pavlyuchenkova	5	6	6

Third round
4	(Croatia) P Martić	6	6
WC	(Australia) K Birrell	1	3
(Russia) D Kasatkina	2	6	6
7	(Russia) A Pavlyuchenkova	6	1	4

Quarterfinals
4	(Croatia) P Martić	0	4
(Russia) D Kasatkina	6	6

=== Bottom half ===
==== Section 3 ====
First round
Q	(Romania) M Buzărnescu	7^{7}	3	3
(Switzerland) J Teichmann	6^{5}	6	6
LL	(Ukraine) L Tsurenko	6	2	3
(Romania) PM Țig	2	6	6
Q	(United Kingdom) F Jones	6	3	6
11	(China) S Zheng	2	6	2
13	(Czech Republic) M Bouzková	3	5
(Montenegro) D Kovinić	6	0^{r}
(Italy) S Errani	2	3
PR	(China) L Zhu	6	6
(Belarus) A Sasnovich	6	6
(United States) L Davis	3	2

Second round
LL	(Romania) M Niculescu	2	2
(Switzerland) J Teichmann	6	6
(Romania) PM Țig	6	6
Q	(United Kingdom) F Jones	1	4
13	(Czech Republic) M Bouzková	6	6
PR	(China) L Zhu	4	2
(Belarus) A Sasnovich	3	6	6^{6}
LL	(Australia) G Da Silva-Fick	6	2	7^{8}

Third round
(Switzerland) J Teichmann	6	3
(Romania) PM Țig	3	3^{r}
13	(Czech Republic) M Bouzková	6	6
LL	(Australia) G Da Silva-Fick	1	1

Quarterfinals
(Switzerland) J Teichmann	3	6	2
13	(Czech Republic) M Bouzková	6	4	6

==== Section 4 ====
First round
Q	(Russia) K Rakhimova	3	3
(Australia) M Inglis	6	6
(Russia) A Blinkova	4	7^{7}	6
(Germany) A Petkovic	6	6^{3}	4
(Romania) I-C Begu	6	6
12	(Argentina) N Podoroska	3	3
14	(Latvia) A Sevastova	6	3	3
(Romania) A Bogdan	4	6	6
(United States) C McHale	6	3	1
(Kazakhstan) Z Diyas	3	6	6
(China) Y Wang	3	4
(United States) M Brengle	6	6

Second round
5	(China) Q Wang	6	6
(Australia) M Inglis	4	2
(Russia) A Blinkova	3	2
(Romania) I-C Begu	6	6
(Romania) A Bogdan	4	7	2
(Kazakhstan) Z Diyas	6	5	6
(United States) M Brengle	6^{4}	6	3
2/WC	(Canada) B Andreescu	7^{7}	4	6

Third round
5	(China) Q Wang	7^{7}	2	1
(Romania) I-C Begu	6^{2}	6	6
(Kazakhstan) Z Diyas	1	0^{r}
2/WC	(Canada) B Andreescu	6	0

Quarterfinals
(Romania) I-C Begu	3	6	6^{5}
2/WC	(Canada) B Andreescu	6	4	7^{7}

== Qualifying ==
=== Seeds ===
1. (Romania) Mihaela Buzărnescu (qualified)
2. (Australia) Lizette Cabrera (qualified)
3. (Romania) Monica Niculescu (qualifying competition, lucky loser)
4. (Ukraine) Lesia Tsurenko (qualifying competition, lucky loser)
5. (Russia) Kamilla Rakhimova (qualified)
6. (Japan) Mayo Hibi (qualifying competition)
7. (India) Ankita Raina (qualified)
8. (United States) Varvara Lepchenko (qualified)

=== Qualifiers ===
1. (Romania) Mihaela Buzărnescu
2. (Australia) Lizette Cabrera
3. (United Kingdom) Francesca Jones
4. (Germany) Mona Barthel
5. (Russia) Kamilla Rakhimova
6. (Canada) Rebecca Marino
7. (India) Ankita Raina
8. (United States) Varvara Lepchenko

=== Lucky losers ===
1. (Ukraine) Lesia Tsurenko
2. (Romania) Monica Niculescu
3. (Australia) Gabriella Da Silva-Fick

=== Draw ===
==== First qualifier ====
Qualifying competition
1	(Romania) Mihaela Buzărnescu	6	6
	(France) Chloé Paquet	2	4

==== Second qualifier ====
Qualifying competition
2	(Australia) Lizette Cabrera	6	6
WC	(Australia) Charlotte Kempenaers-Pocz	2	0

==== Third qualifier ====
Qualifying competition
3	(Romania) Monica Niculescu	2	2
	(United Kingdom) Francesca Jones	6	6

==== Fourth qualifier ====
Qualifying competition
4	(Ukraine) Lesia Tsurenko	7^{7}	5	3
	(Germany) Mona Barthel	6^{1}	7	6

==== Fifth qualifier ====
Qualifying competition
5	(Russia) Kamilla Rakhimova	7^{9}	6
	(Serbia) Olga Danilović	6^{7}	4

==== Sixth qualifier ====
Qualifying competition
6	(Japan) Mayo Hibi	4	3
	(Canada) Rebecca Marino	6	6

==== Seventh qualifier ====
Qualifying competition
7	(India) Ankita Raina	6	4	6
WC	(Australia) Gabriella Da Silva-Fick	0	6	4

==== Eighth qualifier ====
Qualifying competition
8	(United States) Varvara Lepchenko	6	6
	(Russia) Valeria Savinykh	0	4
