= 2021 Yarra Valley Classic – Singles =

Singles
- 2021 Yarra Valley Classic

Final
- Champion: (Australia) Ashleigh Barty
- Runner-up: (Spain) Garbiñe Muguruza
- Score: 7–6^{(7–3)}, 6–4

Details
- Draw: 54
- Seeds: 16

Events
Singles	Doubles
Australian Open Series	· 2022 →

The Yarra Valley Classic was a new addition to the WTA Tour in 2021.

Ashleigh Barty won the title, defeating Garbiñe Muguruza in the final, 7–6^{(7–3)}, 6–4.

Due to a delayed schedule because of a COVID-19 case at a tournament quarantine hotel, all matches from the quarterfinal stage forward played a match tiebreaker in the final set (first to ten points, win by two).

== Seeds ==
The top ten seeds received a bye into the second round.

1. (Australia) Ashleigh Barty (champion)
2. (United States) Sofia Kenin (quarterfinals)
3. (Czech Republic) Karolína Plíšková (third round)
4. (Czech Republic) Petra Kvitová (third round)
5. (United States) Serena Williams (semifinals, withdrew because of right shoulder injury)
6. (Spain) Garbiñe Muguruza (final)
7. (Croatia) Petra Martić (third round)
8. (Czech Republic) Markéta Vondroušová (semifinals)

9. (Croatia) Donna Vekić (second round)
10. (China) Zhang Shuai (withdrew)
11. (Russia) Anastasia Pavlyuchenkova (third round)
12. (France) Fiona Ferro (first round)
13. (United States) Danielle Collins (quarterfinals)
14. (Argentina) Nadia Podoroska (quarterfinals)
15. (France) Kristina Mladenovic (first round)
16. (Czech Republic) Marie Bouzková (third round)

Click on the seed number of a player to go to their draw section.

== Draw ==
=== Key ===
- Q = Qualifier
- WC = Wild card
- LL = Lucky loser
- Alt = Alternate
- SE = Special exempt
- PR = Protected ranking
- ITF = ITF entry
- JE = Junior exempt
- w/o = Walkover
- r = Retired
- d = Defaulted
- SR = Special ranking

=== Finals ===
Quarterfinals
1	(Australia) Ashleigh Barty	7	2	[10]
(United States) Shelby Rogers	5	6	[4]
13	(United States) Danielle Collins	2	6	[6]
5	(United States) Serena Williams	6	4	[10]
8	(Czech Republic) Markéta Vondroušová	4	6	[10]
14	(Argentina) Nadia Podoroska	6	3	[4]
6	(Spain) Garbiñe Muguruza	6	6
2	(United States) Sofia Kenin	2	2

Semifinals
1	(Australia) Ashleigh Barty	w/o
5	(United States) Serena Williams
8	(Czech Republic) Markéta Vondroušová	1	0
6	(Spain) Garbiñe Muguruza	6	6

Final
1	(Australia) Ashleigh Barty	7^{7}	6
6	(Spain) Garbiñe Muguruza	6^{3}	4

=== Top half ===
==== Section 1 ====
First round
(Romania) A Bogdan	6	6
(Russia) K Rakhimova	2	2
(India) A Raina	3	0
(Spain) A Bolsova	6	6
(Australia) S Stosur	2	0
16	(Czech Republic) M Bouzková	6	6
12	(France) F Ferro	2	5
(United States) S Rogers	6	7
(Sweden) R Peterson	6	6
WC	(Australia) M Inglis	2	1
PR	(Kazakhstan) Y Shvedova	6	2	4
Alt	(Belarus) V Lapko	4	6	6

Second round
1	(Australia) A Barty	6	6
(Romania) A Bogdan	3	3
(Spain) A Bolsova	3	7^{8}	2
16	(Czech Republic) M Bouzková	6	6^{6}	6
(United States) S Rogers	6	5	6
(Sweden) R Peterson	4	7	2
Alt	(Belarus) V Lapko	6	3	2
7	(Croatia) P Martić	4	6	6

Third round
1	(Australia) A Barty	6	4	6
16	(Czech Republic) M Bouzková	0	6	3
(United States) S Rogers	7^{7}	6
7	(Croatia) P Martić	6^{1}	3

Quarterfinals
1	(Australia) A Barty	7	2	[10]
(United States) S Rogers	5	6	[4]

==== Section 2 ====
First round
(Italy) E Cocciaretto	0	6	7
PR	(China) L Zhu	6	3	5
(Egypt) M Sherif	3	2
(Serbia) N Stojanović	6	6
(Belgium) Y Bonaventure	3	3
13	(United States) D Collins	6	6
PR	(Bulgaria) T Pironkova	6	6
(Russia) L Samsonova	2	1
(Slovakia) V Kužmová	2	0
WC	(Australia) D Gavrilova	6	6

Second round
3	(Czech Republic) Ka Plíšková	6	6
(Italy) E Cocciaretto	3	2
(Serbia) N Stojanović	2	1
13	(United States) D Collins	6	6
9	(Croatia) D Vekić	6	4	2
PR	(Bulgaria) T Pironkova	1	6	6
WC	(Australia) D Gavrilova	1	4
5	(United States) S Williams	6	6

Third round
3	(Czech Republic) Ka Plíšková	6^{5}	6^{3}
13	(United States) D Collins	7^{7}	7^{7}
PR	(Bulgaria) T Pironkova	1	4
5	(United States) S Williams	6	6

Quarterfinals
13	(United States) D Collins	2	6	[6]
5	(United States) S Williams	6	4	[10]

=== Bottom half ===
==== Section 3 ====
First round
(Russia) V Gracheva	2	6	6
WC	(Australia) L Cabrera	6	4	2
PR	(Russia) V Zvonareva	6	6^{4}	6
(Czech Republic) Kr Plíšková	4	7^{7}	3
14	(Argentina) N Podoroska	6	6
(United Kingdom) F Jones	1	3
(Serbia) O Danilović	4	4
(Belgium) G Minnen	6	6
(Netherlands) A Rus	1	3
(United States) V Williams	6	6

Second round
8	(Czech Republic) M Vondroušová	6	6
(Russia) V Gracheva	4	0
PR	(Russia) V Zvonareva	6	6
Alt	(United States) C Dolehide	2	4
14	(Argentina) N Podoroska	6	6
(Belgium) G Minnen	3	4
(United States) V Williams	6^{6}	5
4	(Czech Republic) P Kvitová	7^{8}	7

Third round
8	(Czech Republic) M Vondroušová	7^{7}	6^{4}	6
PR	(Russia) V Zvonareva	6^{4}	7^{7}	4
14	(Argentina) N Podoroska	5	6	7^{9}
4	(Czech Republic) P Kvitová	7	1	6^{7}

Quarterfinals
8	(Czech Republic) M Vondroušová	4	6	[10]
14	(Argentina) N Podoroska	6	3	[4]

==== Section 4 ====
First round
(Chinese Taipei) S-w Hsieh	2	0
(Belgium) A Van Uytvanck	6	6
(Latvia) A Sevastova	6	6
(United States) M Brengle	4	2
(Japan) M Doi	1	4
11	(Russia) A Pavlyuchenkova	6	6
15	(France) K Mladenovic	4	1
(United States) J Pegula	6	6
WC	(Australia) K Birrell	5	3
PR	(Germany) M Barthel	7	6
(France) C Burel	4	3
(Italy) C Giorgi	6	6

Second round
6	(Spain) G Muguruza	6	6
(Belgium) A Van Uytvanck	2	0
(Latvia) A Sevastova	0	3
11	(Russia) A Pavlyuchenkova	6	6
(United States) J Pegula	6	7
PR	(Germany) M Barthel	4	5
(Italy) C Giorgi	5	0^{r}
2	(United States) S Kenin	7	0

Third round
6	(Spain) G Muguruza	6	6
11	(Russia) A Pavlyuchenkova	1	2
(United States) J Pegula	7	5	2
2	(United States) S Kenin	5	7	6

Quarterfinals
6	(Spain) G Muguruza	6	6
2	(United States) S Kenin	2	2
