= 2021 Great Ocean Road Open =

Tennis tournament

- Date: 1–7 February
- Category: ATP Tour 250
- Draw: 56S / 24D
- Prize money: $382,575 (2021)
- Surface: Hard
- Location: Melbourne, Australia
- Venue: Melbourne Park

Champions

Singles
- (Italy) Jannik Sinner

Doubles
- (United Kingdom) Jamie Murray / (Brazil) Bruno Soares
- Australian Open Series

The 2021 Great Ocean Road Open was a tournament on the 2021 ATP Tour, one of six events in the 2021 Melbourne Summer Series. It was played on outdoor hard courts in Melbourne, Australia. It was organised as a lead-up tournament to the 2021 Australian Open, and was held at the same venue, due to other tournaments in Australia being cancelled as a result of the COVID-19 pandemic. This tournament took place simultaneously with the 2021 Murray River Open and the 2021 ATP Cup, and was considered a relocation of the men's 2021 Adelaide International.

== Finals ==
=== Singles ===
- (Italy) Jannik Sinner defeated (Italy) Stefano Travaglia, 7–6^{(7–4)}, 6–4

=== Doubles ===
- (United Kingdom) Jamie Murray / (Brazil) Bruno Soares defeated (Colombia) Juan Sebastián Cabal / (Colombia) Robert Farah, 6–3, 7–6^{(9–7)}

== Points and prize money ==
=== Point distribution ===
Event	W	F	SF	QF	Round of 16	Round of 32	Round of 64
Singles	250	150	90	45	20	10	0
Doubles	250	150	90	45	20	0	—N/a

=== Prize money ===
Event	W	F	SF	QF	Round of 16	Round of 32	Round of 64
Singles	$19,500	$13,255	$10,000	$7,400	$5,500	$4,000	$2,500
Doubles*	$7,200	$5,760	$4,560	$3,360	$2,160	$1,200	—N/a

_{*per team}

== Singles main-draw entrants ==
=== Seeds ===
Country	Player	Rank^{1}	Seed
BEL	David Goffin	14	1
RUS	Karen Khachanov	20	2
POL	Hubert Hurkacz	29	3
ITA	Jannik Sinner	36	4
GEO	Nikoloz Basilashvili	39	5
USA	Reilly Opelka	40	6
SRB	Miomir Kecmanović	42	7
KAZ	Alexander Bublik	45	8
USA	Tennys Sandgren	50	9
USA	Sam Querrey	51	10
AUS	Jordan Thompson	52	11
SRB	Laslo Đere	56	12
SLO	Aljaž Bedene	58	13
ESP	Pablo Andújar	59	14
~~CAN~~	~~Vasek Pospisil~~	~~61~~	~~15~~
ESP	Feliciano López	63	16

- ^{1} Rankings are as of January 25, 2021

=== Other entrants ===
The following players received wildcards into the main draw:

- (Australia) Max Purcell
- (Australia) Tristan Schoolkate
- (Australia) John-Patrick Smith
- (Australia) Dane Sweeny

The following players have been accepted directly into the main draw using a protected or a special ranking:

- (Chinese Taipei) Lu Yen-hsun
- (Poland) Kamil Majchrzak

The following players received entry as an alternate:

- (Australia) Matthew Ebden
- (Australia) Thomas Fancutt
- (South Korea) Nam Ji-sung

=== Withdrawals ===
Before the tournament

- (Bosnia and Herzegovina) Damir Džumhur → replaced by (Australia) Matthew Ebden
- (United Kingdom) Kyle Edmund → replaced by (Italy) Gianluca Mager
- (Chile) Cristian Garín → replaced by (Japan) Yasutaka Uchiyama
- (United States) John Isner → replaced by (Italy) Andreas Seppi
- (Belarus) Ilya Ivashka → replaced by (South Korea) Nam Ji-sung
- (United States) Steve Johnson → replaced by (Poland) Kamil Majchrzak
- (Canada) Vasek Pospisil → replaced by (Australia) Thomas Fancutt

=== Retirements ===
- (Hungary) Attila Balázs

== Doubles main-draw entrants ==
=== Seeds ===
Country	Player	Country	Player	Rank^{1}	Seed
COL	Juan Sebastián Cabal	COL	Robert Farah	3	1
GBR	Jamie Murray	BRA	Bruno Soares	30	2
CRO	Ivan Dodig	SVK	Filip Polášek	33	3
FRA	Pierre-Hugues Herbert	FIN	Henri Kontinen	56	4
NZL	Marcus Daniell	NZL	Michael Venus	58	5
ESA	Marcelo Arévalo	NED	Matwé Middelkoop	97	6
GBR	Luke Bambridge	GBR	Dominic Inglot	122	7
KAZ	Alexander Bublik	KAZ	Andrey Golubev	178	8

- Rankings are as of January 25, 2021.

=== Other entrants ===
The following pairs received wildcards into the doubles main draw:

- (Netherlands) Robin Haase / (United States) Sam Querrey
- (Australia) Christopher O'Connell / (Australia) Aleksandar Vukic

The following pairs received entry as alternates into the doubles main draw:

- (Spain) Roberto Carballés Baena / (Uruguay) Pablo Cuevas
- (Australia) Tristan Schoolkate / (Australia) Dane Sweeny

=== Withdrawals ===
Before the tournament

- (Netherlands) Robin Haase / (Austria) Oliver Marach → replaced by (Australia) Scott Puodziunas / (Australia) Calum Puttergill
- (United States) Steve Johnson / (United States) Sam Querrey → replaced by (Spain) Roberto Carballés Baena / (Uruguay) Pablo Cuevas
- (United States) Reilly Opelka / (Canada) Vasek Pospisil → replaced by (Australia) Tristan Schoolkate / (Australia) Dane Sweeny

During the tournament

- (Poland) Hubert Hurkacz / (Italy) Jannik Sinner
- (Serbia) Miomir Kecmanović / (Russia) Karen Khachanov
- (Australia) Max Purcell / (Australia) Jordan Thompson

=== Retirements ===
- (Georgia (country)) Nikoloz Basilashvili / (Germany) Andre Begemann
- (Australia) Tristan Schoolkate / (Australia) Dane Sweeny
