= 2021 Murray River Open =

- Date: 1–7 February
- Edition: 1st
- Category: ATP Tour 250
- Draw: 56S / 24D
- Prize money: $320,775
- Surface: Hard
- Location: Melbourne, Australia
- Venue: Melbourne Park

Champions

Singles
- (United Kingdom) Dan Evans

Doubles
- (Croatia) Nikola Mektić / (Croatia) Mate Pavić
Australian Open Series	· 2022 →

The 2021 Murray River Open was a tournament on the 2021 ATP Tour. It was played on outdoor hard courts in Melbourne, Australia. It was organised as a lead-up tournament to the 2021 Australian Open, and was held at the same venue, due to other tournaments in Australia being cancelled as a result from the COVID-19 pandemic. This tournament took place simultaneously with the 2021 Great Ocean Road Open and the 2021 ATP Cup.

== Points and prize money ==
=== Point distribution ===
Event	W	F	SF	QF	Round of 16	Round of 32	Round of 64
Singles	250	150	90	45	20	10	0
Doubles	250	150	90	45	20	0	—

=== Prize money ===
Event	W	F	SF	QF	Round of 16	Round of 32	Round of 64
Singles	$19,500	$13,255	$10,000	$7,400	$5,500	$4,000	$2,500
Doubles*	$7,200	$5,760	$4,560	$3,360	$2,160	$1,200	—

_{*per team}

== Singles main-draw entrants ==
=== Seeds ===
Country	Player	Rank^{1}	Seed
SUI	Stan Wawrinka	18	1
BUL	Grigor Dimitrov	19	2
CAN	Félix Auger-Aliassime	21	3
CRO	Borna Ćorić	25	4
NOR	Casper Ruud	27	5
USA	Taylor Fritz	30	6
FRA	Ugo Humbert	32	7
GBR	Daniel Evans	33	8
ITA	Lorenzo Sonego	34	9
FRA	Adrian Mannarino	35	10
CRO	Marin Čilić	43	11
ESP	Albert Ramos Viñolas	46	12
AUS	Nick Kyrgios	47	13
FRA	Richard Gasquet	48	14
USA	Tommy Paul	53	15
HUN	Márton Fucsovics	55	16

- ^{1} Rankings are as of January 25, 2021

=== Other entrants ===
The following players received wildcards into the main draw:

- (Australia) Andrew Harris
- (Australia) Jason Kubler
- (Australia) Blake Mott
- (Australia) Li Tu

The following players have been accepted directly into the main draw using a protected or a special ranking:

- (Australia) Thanasi Kokkinakis

The following player received entry as an alternate:

- (Australia) Harry Bourchier

=== Withdrawals ===
Before the tournament

- (Spain) Alejandro Davidovich Fokina → replaced by (Japan) Yūichi Sugita
- (Portugal) João Sousa → replaced by (Australia) James Duckworth
- (Australia) Bernard Tomic → replaced by (Australia) Harry Bourchier

During the tournament

- (Switzerland) Stan Wawrinka

=== Retirements ===
- (Czech Republic) Jiří Veselý

== Doubles main-draw entrants ==
=== Seeds ===
Country	Player	Country	Player	Rank^{1}	Seed
CRO	Nikola Mektić	CRO	Mate Pavić	10	1
NED	Wesley Koolhof	POL	Łukasz Kubot	14	2
USA	Rajeev Ram	GBR	Joe Salisbury	27	3
BRA	Marcelo Melo	ROU	Horia Tecău	31	4
FRA	Jérémy Chardy	FRA	Fabrice Martin	60	5
BEL	Sander Gillé	BEL	Joran Vliegen	75	6
GBR	Ken Skupski	GBR	Neal Skupski	84	7
BRA	Marcelo Demoliner	MEX	Santiago González	92	8

- Rankings are as of January 25, 2021.

=== Other entrants ===
The following pairs received wildcards into the doubles main draw:

- (Australia) James Duckworth / (Australia) Marc Polmans
- (Australia) Andrew Harris / (Australia) Alexei Popyrin

The following pair received entry using a protected ranking:

- (United States) Mackenzie McDonald / (United States) Tommy Paul

== Champions ==
=== Singles ===
- (United Kingdom) Dan Evans def. (Canada) Félix Auger-Aliassime, 6–2, 6–3

=== Doubles ===
- (Croatia) Nikola Mektić / (Croatia) Mate Pavić def. (France) Jérémy Chardy / (France) Fabrice Martin, 7–6^{(7–2)}, 6–3
