= 2021 Gippsland Trophy =

- Date: 31 January – 7 February
- Edition: 1st
- Category: WTA 500
- Draw: 54S / 28D
- Prize money: $447,620
- Surface: Hard
- Location: Melbourne, Australia
- Venue: Melbourne Park

Champions

Singles
- (Belgium) Elise Mertens

Doubles
- (Czech Republic) Barbora Krejčíková / (Czech Republic) Kateřina Siniaková
Australian Open Series	· 2022 →

The 2021 Gippsland Trophy was a tournament on the 2021 WTA Tour. It was played on outdoor hard courts in Melbourne, Australia. It was organised as a lead-up tournament to the 2021 Australian Open, and was held at the same venue, due to other tournaments in Australia being cancelled as a result from the COVID-19 pandemic. This tournament took place simultaneously with the 2021 Yarra Valley Classic and the 2021 Grampians Trophy. Players who had originally intended to participate in this tournament or the Yarra Valley Classic, but were forced to undergo strict quarantine measures upon arrival in Australia, were able to participate in the 2021 Grampians Trophy. The entry list of 2021 Australian Open was used to determine the entry list of this tournament; with half the players (selected randomly) playing the Gippsland Trophy, and the other half playing the 2021 Yarra Valley Classic.

== Champions ==
=== Singles ===
- (Belgium) Elise Mertens def. (Estonia) Kaia Kanepi, 6–4, 6–1

=== Doubles ===
- (Czech Republic) Barbora Krejčíková / (Czech Republic) Kateřina Siniaková def. (Chinese Taipei) Chan Hao-ching / (Chinese Taipei) Latisha Chan, 6–3, 7–6^{(7–4)}

== Points and prize money ==
=== Point distribution ===
Event	W	F	SF	QF	Round of 16	Round of 32	Round of 64
Singles	470	305	185	100	55	30	1
Doubles	470	305	185	100	55	1	—

=== Prize money ===
Event	W	F	SF	QF	Round of 16	Round of 32	Round of 64
Singles	$50,000	$33,520	$18,610	$8,770	$5,500	$4,250	$3,000
Doubles*	$20,890	$13,370	$8,350	$4,310	$2,670	$2,020	—

_{*per team}

== Singles main-draw entrants ==
=== Seeds ===
Country	Player	Rank^{1}	Seed
ROU	Simona Halep	2	1
JPN	Naomi Osaka	3	2
UKR	Elina Svitolina	5	3
BLR	Aryna Sabalenka	7	4
GBR	Johanna Konta	14	5
POL	Iga Świątek	17	6
BEL	Elise Mertens	20	7
CZE	Karolína Muchová	27	8
RUS	Ekaterina Alexandrova	33	9
CHN	Wang Qiang	34	10
CHN	Zheng Saisai	42	11
FRA	Caroline Garcia	44	12
LAT	Jeļena Ostapenko	45	13
USA	Cori Gauff	48	14
SLO	Polona Hercog	49	15
GER	Laura Siegemund	51	16

- ^{1} Rankings are as of 25 January 2021

=== Other entrants ===
The following players received wildcards:

- (Australia) Destanee Aiava
- (Australia) Olivia Gadecki
- (Australia) Arina Rodionova
- (Australia) Astra Sharma

The following players received entry using a protected ranking into the Australian Open singles main draw, and hence this tournament as well:

- (United Kingdom) Katie Boulter
- (Russia) Anastasia Potapova
- (China) Wang Yafan

The following players received entry from the Australian Open qualifying draw:

- (Hungary) Tímea Babos
- (Italy) Sara Errani
- (Japan) Mayo Hibi
- (Slovenia) Kaja Juvan
- (Canada) Rebecca Marino
- (United States) Whitney Osuigwe
- (France) Chloé Paquet
- (Russia) Valeria Savinykh

The following players received entry into this tournament as they were potential lucky losers for the Australian Open singles main draw:

- (Romania) Mihaela Buzărnescu
- (Russia) Margarita Gasparyan
- (United States) Varvara Lepchenko
- (Slovakia) Anna Karolína Schmiedlová
- (Ukraine) Lesia Tsurenko

The following players received entry as an alternate:

- (United States) Caty McNally
- (Romania) Monica Niculescu

=== Withdrawals ===
Before the tournament

- (Kazakhstan) Zarina Diyas → replaced by (Romania) Monica Niculescu
- (Japan) Nao Hibino → replaced by (United States) Caty McNally

During the tournament

- (Czech Republic) Karolína Muchová
- (Japan) Naomi Osaka

== Doubles main-draw entrants ==
=== Seeds ===
Country	Player	Country	Player	Rank^{1}	Seed
CZE	Barbora Krejčíková	CZE	Kateřina Siniaková	15	1
TPE	Chan Hao-Ching	TPE	Latisha Chan	30	2
CAN	Gabriela Dabrowski	USA	Bethanie Mattek-Sands	32	3
SLO	Andreja Klepač	BEL	Elise Mertens	46	4
AUS	Samantha Stosur	CHN	Zhang Shuai	60	5
USA	Hayley Carter	BRA	Luisa Stefani	64	6
GER	Laura Siegemund	RUS	Vera Zvonareva	75	7
RUS	Anna Blinkova	RUS	Veronika Kudermetova	75	8

- Rankings are as of 25 January 2021

=== Other entrants ===
The following pairs received a wildcard into the doubles main draw:

- (Australia) Destanee Aiava / (Australia) Astra Sharma
- (Australia) Daria Gavrilova / (Romania) Simona Halep
- (Australia) Abbie Myers / (Australia) Ivana Popovic

The following pair received entry using a protected ranking:

- (Germany) Mona Barthel / (China) Zhu Lin

=== Withdrawals ===
During the tournament

- (Australia) Daria Gavrilova / (Romania) Simona Halep
