= 2021 Phillip Island Trophy =

Tournament on the 2021 WTA Tour

- Date: 13–19 February
- Edition: 1st
- Category: WTA 250
- Draw: 56S / 16Q / 24D
- Prize money: $235,238
- Surface: Hard
- Location: Melbourne, Australia
- Venue: Melbourne Park

Champions

Singles
- (Russia) Daria Kasatkina

Doubles
- (India) Ankita Raina / (Russia) Kamilla Rakhimova
| Australian Open Series |

The 2021 Phillip Island Trophy is a tournament on the 2021 WTA Tour, one of six events in the 2021 Melbourne Summer Series. It was played on outdoor hard courts in Melbourne, Australia. It was organised as a lead-up tournament to the 2021 Australian Open, and was held at the same venue, due to other tournaments in Australia being cancelled as a result from the COVID-19 pandemic. This tournament took place simultaneously with the second week of the 2021 Australian Open.

== Champions ==
=== Singles ===
- (Russia) Daria Kasatkina def. (Czech Republic) Marie Bouzková 4–6, 6–2, 6–2

=== Doubles ===
- (India) Ankita Raina / (Russia) Kamilla Rakhimova def. (Russia) Anna Blinkova / (Russia) Anastasia Potapova 2–6, 6–4, [10–7]

== Points and prize money ==
=== Point distribution ===
| Event | W | F | SF | QF | Round of 16 | Round of 32 | Round of 64 | Q | Q1 |
| Singles | 280 | 180 | 110 | 60 | 30 | 16 | 1 | 12 | 1 |
| Doubles | 280 | 180 | 110 | 60 | 30 | 1 | — | — | — |

=== Prize money ===
| Event | W | F | SF | QF | Round of 16 | Round of 32 | Round of 64 | Q1 |
| Singles | $28,500 | $20,850 | $11,100 | $5,250 | $2,700 | $1,900 | $1,400 | $1,211 |
| Doubles* | $8,000 | $5,000 | $3,000 | $1,500 | $1,300 | $1,000 | — | — |

_{*per team}

== Singles main-draw entrants ==
=== Seeds ===
| Country | Player | Rank^{a} | Seed |
|---|---|---|---|
| USA | Sofia Kenin | 4 | 1 |
| CAN | Bianca Andreescu | 9 | 2 |
| ~~GBR~~ | ~~Johanna Konta~~ | ~~15~~ | ~~3~~ |
| CRO | Petra Martić | 19 | 4 |
| CHN | Wang Qiang | 34 | 5 |
| ~~CHN~~ | ~~Zhang Shuai~~ | ~~35~~ | ~~6~~ |
| RUS | Anastasia Pavlyuchenkova | 39 | 7 |
| USA | Danielle Collins | 40 | 8 |
| USA | Sloane Stephens | 41 | 9 |
| FRA | Caroline Garcia | 43 | 10 |
| CHN | Zheng Saisai | 44 | 11 |
| ARG | Nadia Podoroska | 45 | 12 |
| CZE | Marie Bouzková | 50 | 13 |
| LAT | Anastasija Sevastova | 53 | 14 |
| FRA | Alizé Cornet | 54 | 15 |
| SWE | Rebecca Peterson | 55 | 16 |

^{a} Rankings are as of 8 February 2021

=== Other entrants ===
The following players received wildcards into the singles main draw:

- (Australia) Destanee Aiava
- (Canada) Bianca Andreescu
- (Australia) Kimberly Birrell
- (Australia) Olivia Gadecki
- (United States) Sofia Kenin

The following players used a protected ranking to enter the singles main draw:

- (United Kingdom) Katie Boulter
- (China) Zhu Lin

The following players received entry from the qualifying draw:

- (Germany) Mona Barthel
- (Romania) Mihaela Buzărnescu
- (Australia) Lizette Cabrera
- (United Kingdom) Francesca Jones
- (United States) Varvara Lepchenko
- (Canada) Rebecca Marino
- (India) Ankita Raina
- (Russia) Kamilla Rakhimova

The following players received entry as lucky losers:

- (Australia) Gabriella Da Silva-Fick
- (Romania) Monica Niculescu
- (Ukraine) Lesia Tsurenko

=== Withdrawals ===
Before the tournament

- (Russia) Ekaterina Alexandrova → replaced by (Ukraine) Lesia Tsurenko
- (United States) Amanda Anisimova → replaced by (Australia) Ajla Tomljanović
- (United States) Catherine Bellis → replaced by (Russia) Daria Kasatkina
- (Switzerland) Belinda Bencic → replaced by (Japan) Nao Hibino
- (United States) Jennifer Brady → replaced by (China) Zhu Lin
- (France) Fiona Ferro → replaced by (United States) Lauren Davis
- (United States) Coco Gauff → replaced by (Montenegro) Danka Kovinić
- (Slovenia) Polona Hercog → replaced by (Romania) Irina-Camelia Begu
- (United States) Madison Keys → replaced by (Russia) Anna Blinkova
- (United Kingdom) Johanna Konta → replaced by (Australia) Gabriella Da Silva-Fick
- (Russia) Veronika Kudermetova → replaced by (Kazakhstan) Zarina Diyas
- (Russia) Svetlana Kuznetsova → replaced by (United States) Christina McHale
- (Tunisia) Ons Jabeur → replaced by (United States) Madison Brengle
- (Poland) Magda Linette → replaced by (Japan) Misaki Doi
- (Belgium) Elise Mertens → replaced by (United Kingdom) Katie Boulter
- (France) Kristina Mladenovic → replaced by (Belarus) Aliaksandra Sasnovich
- (Spain) Garbiñe Muguruza → replaced by (Romania) Ana Bogdan
- (Latvia) Jeļena Ostapenko → replaced by (Russia) Varvara Gracheva
- (Kazakhstan) Yulia Putintseva → replaced by (China) Wang Yafan
- (United States) Alison Riske → replaced by (Russia) Anastasia Potapova
- (Kazakhstan) Elena Rybakina → replaced by (Germany) Andrea Petkovic
- (Germany) Laura Siegemund → replaced by (Belgium) Greet Minnen
- (Czech Republic) Barbora Strýcová → replaced by (Hungary) Tímea Babos
- (Poland) Iga Świątek → replaced by (Russia) Liudmila Samsonova
- (Croatia) Donna Vekić → replaced by (Australia) Maddison Inglis
- (Czech Republic) Markéta Vondroušová → replaced by (Italy) Sara Errani
- (United Kingdom) Heather Watson → replaced by (Italy) Elisabetta Cocciaretto
- (Ukraine) Dayana Yastremska → replaced by (Spain) Sara Sorribes Tormo
- (China) Zhang Shuai → replaced by (Romania) Monica Niculescu

During the tournament

- (Spain) Sara Sorribes Tormo

=== Retirements ===
- (Kazakhstan) Zarina Diyas
- (Montenegro) Danka Kovinić
- (Romania) Patricia Maria Țig

== Doubles main-draw entrants ==
=== Seeds ===
| Country | Player | Country | Player | Rank^{b} | Seed |
|---|---|---|---|---|---|
| TPE | Chan Hao-ching | TPE | Latisha Chan | 32 | 1 |
| ROU | Monica Niculescu | CHN | Yang Zhaoxuan | 108 | 2 |
| USA | Kaitlyn Christian | USA | Sabrina Santamaria | 132 | 3 |
| ROU | Andreea Mitu | ROU | Raluca Olaru | 138 | 4 |
| GEO | Oksana Kalashnikova | SWE | Cornelia Lister | 143 | 5 |
| BEL | Kirsten Flipkens | BEL | Greet Minnen | 145 | 6 |
| JPN | Makoto Ninomiya | CHN | Wang Yafan | 147 | 7 |
| JPN | Misaki Doi | JPN | Nao Hibino | 151 | 8 |

^{b} Rankings are as of 8 February 2021.

=== Other entrants ===
The following pair received a wildcard into the doubles main draw:

- (Australia) Destanee Aiava / (Australia) Charlotte Kempenaers-Pocz

=== Withdrawals ===
During the tournament

- (Australia) Kimberly Birrell / (Australia) Olivia Gadecki
- (Japan) Misaki Doi / (Japan) Nao Hibino
- (Czech Republic) Marie Bouzková / (Spain) Sara Sorribes Tormo
