= Australian Open Series =

Annual selection of tennis tournaments

The Australian Open Series is a selection of tennis tournaments held annually prior to the start of the Australian Open in Melbourne. In 2023, there are five official Australian Open Series tournaments held across Australia in preparation for the first Grand Slam of the year, as designated by Tennis Australia.

== Tournaments ==
=== Week 1 ===
==== United Cup ====
- Finals: Ken Rosewall Arena, Sydney
- Group Stages: RAC Arena, Perth, and Sydney Olympic Park Tennis Centre, Sydney

The United Cup has been announced to launch in 2023 as a lead up event to the Australian Open. The concept of the United Cup is to be a multi-gender tournament where players form teams to represent their countries. The United Cup was brought in to replace the unpopular ATP Cup in the Australian summer of tennis schedule.

==== Brisbane International ====
- Queensland Tennis Centre, Brisbane

The Brisbane International is a professional tennis tournament played on outdoor hard courts in Brisbane, Queensland. It formed part of the Women's Tennis Association (WTA) and Association of Tennis Professionals (ATP) Tours. It was held annually in January at the Queensland Tennis Centre, between 2009 and 2019 before reverting to a WTA only event for 2020 to accommodate the ATP Cup which would be played in Brisbane, Sydney and Perth. The tournament was not seen in 2021 and 2022 due to the COVID-19 pandemic, and was dropped entirely from Tennis Australia's schedule for 2023. The Tournament returned to both the ATP and WTA calendars in 2024.

==== Canberra International ====
- Canberra Tennis Centre, Canberra

The Canberra International will form part of the Australian Open Series schedule in 2023. The tournament will be an ATP Challenger 100 event for the men's draw, and an ITF 60 event for the women's draw. The event took on greater status amongst the Australian summer schedule for 2023, whilst returning from a 3-year hiatus due to the 2019-20 Australian bushfire season and then the COVID-19 pandemic. From 2024, the event is an ATP Challenger 125 and a WTA Challenger 125.

=== Week 2 ===
==== Adelaide International ====
- Memorial Drive Park, Adelaide

The Adelaide International forms part of the Women's Tennis Association (WTA) Tour and Association of Tennis Professionals (ATP) Tour. The inaugural tournament was staged in January 2020 and took place at the upgraded Memorial Drive Park facility. In 2022 and 2023 there were two events ("Adelaide International 1" and "Adelaide International 2") held in consecutive weeks in the lead up to the Australian Open. In 2024, with the return of the Brisbane International in Week 1, the Adelaide International returned to a single tournament in the week leading into the Australian Open.

==== Hobart International ====
- Hobart International Tennis Centre, Hobart

The Hobart International is a women's professional tennis tournament held at the Hobart International Tennis Centre in Hobart, Australia. Held since 1994, it forms a part of the Women's Tennis Association (WTA) Tour and is classed as an International tournament (previously Tier IV). It is competed on outdoor hardcourts, and is held in the run-up to the first Grand Slam tournament of the year, the Australian Open.

==== Kooyong Classic ====
- Kooyong Lawn Tennis Club, Melbourne

The Kooyong Classic is an exhibition tournament played in the lead-up to the Australian Open. The format for the Classic altered in accordance with the number of players participating, though in most years it featured both men's and women's singles matches. Kooyong was the original home of the Australian Open before the tournament moved to Melbourne Park in 1988.

=== Weeks 3 and 4 ===
==== Australian Open ====
The Australian Open is one of four Grand Slam events on the international tennis schedule. First played in 1905, it is held at Melbourne Park in Melbourne in the second half of January. It is the official Grand Slam of the Asia-Pacific.

== Former tournaments ==
=== ATP Cup ===
The ATP Cup was introduced in 2020 as a representative multi-city tournament where men's players form teams to represent their countries. The ATP Cup was initially supposed to be an annual tournament played across the cities of Sydney, Brisbane and Perth. The initial season in 2020 was played under this format, before the COVID-19 pandemic meant the tournament was staged in Melbourne in 2021 in the immediate lead up to the 2021 Australian Open, before the tournament was staged entirely in Sydney in 2022.

The ATP Cup lasted 3 editions before being discontinued after the 2022 edition due to poor attendance and a general lack of popularity amongst fans and players alike. It was replaced by a mixed-sex national team tournament known as the United Cup for 2023.

=== Hopman Cup ===
- Perth Arena, Perth

The Hopman Cup was an eight-nation tournament featuring one male and one female player representing their country. The tournament was originally played at the Burswood Dome before being moved to the Perth Arena in 2014. It has featured several of the top players, including Roger Federer, who won the last edition for Switzerland with compatriot Belinda Bencic.

=== Sydney International ===
- Sydney Olympic Park Tennis Centre, Sydney

The Sydney International (formerly known as the Championship of New South Wales and New South Wales Open) was played in the lead-up to the Australian Open for both men and women. The tournament was removed from the calendar in 2020 to make way for the ATP Cup. The tournament returned for a one-off edition in 2022, known as the Sydney Tennis Classic.

=== World Tennis Challenge ===
- Memorial Drive Park, Adelaide

The World Tennis Challenge was a three-night exhibition tournament held in the week before the Australian Open in Adelaide, South Australia. The tournament was created by a consortium of past players. It usually had four teams of two players, a 'legend' and a current player were paired into areas e.g. Americas or represent their countries. The current players played each other in a best of 3 match with a match tiebreaker for a 3rd set. The legends played a pro set, and the doubles if needed was a normal set with no a rules before a super tie break.

=== 2021 and 2022 COVID-19 alternative tournaments ===
In 2021 most of the usual tournaments were either relocated to Melbourne Park or not held at all, as a result of international and domestic travel restrictions imposed by the COVID-19 pandemic. The 2021 ATP Cup was moved to Melbourne Park but cut to 12 teams, whilst two WTA tournaments (the Gippsland Trophy and Yarra Valley Classic) and two ATP tournaments (the Great Ocean Road Open and Murray River Open) were held at the park in the lead-up to the 2021 Australian Open. An additional WTA tournament, the Grampians Trophy was later added for players who had to undergo strict quarantine measures upon arrival in Australia, serving as preparation for the Australian Open. Two other WTA tournaments, the Phillip Island Trophy and Adelaide International, were staged in the last week and week after the Open. All of the new alternative tournaments except one (sans Adelaide) take place in Melbourne Park but are named after various places in the state of Victoria.

In 2022, the series also had an abnormal calendar. Two new tournaments were created in Melbourne Park for the WTA and one new tournament was created for the ATP. The tournaments were named Melbourne Summer Set 1 and Melbourne Summer Set 2. Men did not have a tournament for the Melbourne Summer Set 2.

== See also ==
- Australian Open
