= 2011 Aircel Chennai Open – Singles qualifying =

Singles qualifying
- 2011 Aircel Chennai Open

Events
Singles	Doubles
← 2010 ·	Aircel Chennai Open	· 2012 →

The 2011 Aircel Chennai Open was a tennis tournament played on outdoor hard courts. It was the 16th edition of the Chennai Open, and part of the 250 series of the 2011 ATP World Tour. It took place at the SDAT Tennis Stadium in Chennai, India, from 3 January through 9 January 2011.

== Players ==
=== Seeds ===
1. (Japan) Go Soeda (qualifying competition)
2. (France) Édouard Roger-Vasselin (Qualifier)
3. (Republic of Ireland) Conor Niland (first round)
4. (Russia) Konstantin Kravchuk (qualifying competition)
5. (Canada) Milos Raonic (qualifying competition)
6. (Russia) Alexander Kudryavtsev (Qualifier)
7. (Czech Republic) Ivo Minář (second round)
8. (Japan) Yūichi Sugita (Qualifier)

=== Qualifiers ===
1. (Belgium) David Goffin
2. (France) Édouard Roger-Vasselin
3. (Russia) Alexander Kudryavtsev
4. (Japan) Yūichi Sugita

== Draw ==
=== Key ===
- Q = Qualifier
- WC = Wild card
- LL = Lucky loser
- Alt = Alternate
- ITF = ITF entry
- PR = Protected ranking
- SR = Special ranking
- SE = Special exempt
- JE = Junior exempt
- JR = Junior Accelerator Programme entrant
- CO = College Accelerator Programme entrant
- NG = Next Gen Accelerator Program entrant
- w/o = Walkover
- r = Retired
- d = Defaulted

=== First qualifier ===
First round
1	(Japan) Go Soeda	5
WC	(Germany) Daniel Puttkammer	2^{r}
(India) Karunuday Singh	6	6
WC	(Germany) Andreas Gremelmayr	2	2
(Belgium) David Goffin	6	6
(India) Akash Wagh	1	1
(India) Vijay Sundar Prashanth	1	3
7	(Czech Republic) Ivo Minář	6	6

Second round
1	(Japan) Go Soeda	6	7
(India) Karunuday Singh	3	5
(Belgium) David Goffin	4	6	6
7	(Czech Republic) Ivo Minář	6	3	1

Qualifying competition
1	(Japan) Go Soeda	3	4
(Belgium) David Goffin	6	6

=== Second qualifier ===
First round
2	(France) Édouard Roger-Vasselin	6	6
(India) Shahbaaz Khan	0	0
(Croatia) Franko Škugor	6	6
(India) Sanam Singh	1	2
WC	(India) Ajai Selvaraj	4	1
(Russia) Evgeny Kirillov	6	6
(Bosnia and Herzegovina) Aldin Šetkić	2	4
5	(Canada) Milos Raonic	6	6

Second round
2	(France) Édouard Roger-Vasselin	6	3	6
(Croatia) Franko Škugor	4	6	3
(Russia) Evgeny Kirillov	2	5
5	(Canada) Milos Raonic	6	7

Qualifying competition
2	(France) Édouard Roger-Vasselin	7^{7}	3	7^{7}
5	(Canada) Milos Raonic	6^{2}	6	6^{5}

=== Third qualifier ===
First round
3	(Republic of Ireland) Conor Niland	6	5	4
(India) Vishnu Vardhan	4	7	6
(Croatia) Ante Pavić	6	6
(Pakistan) Aisam-ul-Haq Qureshi	4	4
(India) Karan Rastogi	6^{4}	3
(United States) Rajeev Ram	7^{7}	6
(India) Purav Raja	0	1
6	(Russia) Alexander Kudryavtsev	6	6

Second round
(India) Vishnu Vardhan	1	4
(Croatia) Ante Pavić	6	6
(United States) Rajeev Ram	0	6	5
6	(Russia) Alexander Kudryavtsev	6	4	7

Qualifying Round
(Croatia) Ante Pavić	2	6	2
6	(Russia) Alexander Kudryavtsev	6	0	6

=== Fourth qualifier ===
First round
4	(Russia) Konstantin Kravchuk	6	7^{7}
(India) Divij Sharan	2	6^{3}
(India) Vignesh Peranamallur	4	6^{6}
WC	(India) Rupesh Roy	6	7^{8}
(Czech Republic) Leoš Friedl	6	3	6
(United States) David Martin	4	6	3
(India) Ranjeet Virali-Murugesan	3	0
8	(Japan) Yūichi Sugita	6	6

Second round
4	(Russia) Konstantin Kravchuk	6	6
WC	(India) Rupesh Roy	3	1
(Czech Republic) Leoš Friedl	w/o
8	(Japan) Yūichi Sugita

Qualifying competition
4	(Russia) Konstantin Kravchuk	2	3
8	(Japan) Yūichi Sugita	6	6
