= 2021 Erste Bank Open – Singles =

Singles
- 2021 Erste Bank Open

Final
- Champion: (Germany) Alexander Zverev
- Runner-up: (United States) Frances Tiafoe
- Score: 7–5, 6–4

Details
- Draw: 32 (4 Q / 3 WC )
- Seeds: 8

Events
Singles	Doubles
← 2020 ·	Vienna Open	· 2022 →

Andrey Rublev was the defending champion, but chose to compete in St. Petersburg instead.

Alexander Zverev won the title, defeating Frances Tiafoe in the final, 7–5, 6–4.

== Seeds ==
1. (Greece) Stefanos Tsitsipas (second round)
2. (Germany) Alexander Zverev (champion)
3. (Italy) Matteo Berrettini (quarterfinals)
4. (Norway) Casper Ruud (quarterfinals)
5. (Poland) Hubert Hurkacz (first round)
6. (Canada) Félix Auger-Aliassime (quarterfinals)
7. (Italy) Jannik Sinner (semifinals)
8. (Argentina) Diego Schwartzman (quarterfinals)

== Draw ==
=== Key ===
- Q = Qualifier
- WC = Wild card
- LL = Lucky loser
- Alt = Alternate
- SE = Special exempt
- PR = Protected ranking
- ITF = ITF entry
- JE = Junior exempt
- w/o = Walkover
- r = Retired
- d = Defaulted
- SR = Special ranking

=== Finals ===
Semifinals
Q	(United States) Frances Tiafoe	3	7	6
7	(Italy) Jannik Sinner	6	5	2
(Spain) Carlos Alcaraz	3	3
2	(Germany) Alexander Zverev	6	6

Final
Q	(United States) Frances Tiafoe	5	4
2	(Germany) Alexander Zverev	7	6

=== Top half ===
First round
1	(Greece) S Tsitsipas	7^{8}	6
(Bulgaria) G Dimitrov	6^{6}	4
(Serbia) D Lajović	4	4
Q	(United States) F Tiafoe	6	6
(France) G Monfils	7^{7}	6
WC	(Italy) L Musetti	6^{2}	4
(Italy) F Fognini	2	5
8	(Argentina) D Schwartzman	6	7
4	(Norway) C Ruud	7	7^{7}
(South Africa) L Harris	5	6^{2}
(Italy) L Sonego	6	6
LL	(Germany) D Koepfer	4	3
WC	(Austria) D Novak	7^{7}	7^{7}
Q	(Italy) G Mager	6^{4}	6^{4}
(United States) R Opelka	4	2
7	(Italy) J Sinner	6	6

Second round
1	(Greece) S Tsitsipas	6	3	4
Q	(United States) F Tiafoe	3	6	6
(France) G Monfils	6^{5}	6	2
8	(Argentina) D Schwartzman	7^{7}	4	6
4	(Norway) C Ruud	7	4	6
(Italy) L Sonego	5	6	4
WC	(Austria) D Novak	4	2
7	(Italy) J Sinner	6	6

Quarterfinals
Q	(United States) F Tiafoe	6	7^{8}
8	(Argentina) D Schwartzman	4	6^{6}
4	(Norway) C Ruud	5	1
7	(Italy) J Sinner	7	6

Semifinals
Q	(United States) F Tiafoe	3	7	6
7	(Italy) J Sinner	6	5	2

=== Bottom half ===
First round
5	(Poland) H Hurkacz	4	7^{8}	3
WC	(United Kingdom) A Murray	6	6^{6}	6
(Spain) C Alcaraz	6	6
(United Kingdom) D Evans	4	3
(Georgia (country)) N Basilashvili	7	4	6
(Spain) P Carreño Busta	5	6	3
Q	(Australia) A Popyrin	6^{3}	3
3	(Italy) M Berrettini	7^{7}	6
6	(Canada) F Auger-Aliassime	6	6
SE	(Lithuania) R Berankis	3	2
(United Kingdom) C Norrie	7^{7}	6
(Hungary) M Fucsovics	6^{4}	1
(Australia) A de Minaur	6	7^{7}
Q	(South Africa) K Anderson	3	6^{3}
(Serbia) F Krajinović	2	5
2	(Germany) A Zverev	6	7

Second round
WC	(United Kingdom) A Murray	3	4
(Spain) C Alcaraz	6	6
(Georgia (country)) N Basilashvili	7^{7}	2	3
3	(Italy) M Berrettini	6^{5}	6	6
6	(Canada) F Auger-Aliassime	2	7^{8}	6
(United Kingdom) C Norrie	6	6^{6}	4
(Australia) A de Minaur	2	6	2
2	(Germany) A Zverev	6	3	6

Quarterfinals
(Spain) C Alcaraz	6	6^{2}	7^{7}
3	(Italy) M Berrettini	1	7^{7}	6^{5}
6	(Canada) F Auger-Aliassime	4	6	3
2	(Germany) A Zverev	6	3	6

Semifinals
(Spain) C Alcaraz	3	3
2	(Germany) A Zverev	6	6

== Qualifying ==
=== Seeds ===
1. (United States) Frances Tiafoe (qualified)
2. (United States) Marcos Giron (first round)
3. (South Africa) Kevin Anderson (qualified)
4. (Germany) Dominik Koepfer (qualifying competition, lucky loser)
5. (Italy) Gianluca Mager (qualified)
6. (Australia) Alexei Popyrin (qualified)
7. (Spain) Roberto Carballés Baena (qualifying competition)
8. (Germany) Peter Gojowczyk (first round)

=== Qualifiers ===
1. (United States) Frances Tiafoe
2. (Australia) Alexei Popyrin
3. (South Africa) Kevin Anderson
4. (Italy) Gianluca Mager

=== Lucky loser ===
1. (Germany) Dominik Koepfer

=== Qualifying draw ===
==== First qualifier ====
First round
1	(United States) Frances Tiafoe	6	3	6
(Slovakia) Alex Molčan	4	6	1
WC	(Austria) Lucas Miedler	7^{7}	6
8	(Germany) Peter Gojowczyk	6^{4}	2

Qualifying competition
1	(United States) Frances Tiafoe	6^{5}	6	6
WC	(Austria) Lucas Miedler	7^{7}	4	3

==== Second qualifier ====
First round
2	(United States) Marcos Giron	6^{5}	4
(Slovakia) Norbert Gombos	7^{7}	6
(Spain) Feliciano López	5	6^{8}
6	(Australia) Alexei Popyrin	7	7^{10}

Qualifying competition
(Slovakia) Norbert Gombos	6^{3}	7^{7}	5
6	(Australia) Alexei Popyrin	7^{7}	6^{0}	7

==== Third qualifier ====
First round
3	(South Africa) Kevin Anderson	6	6
Alt	(Austria) Jurij Rodionov	1	4
WC	(Switzerland) Dominic Stricker	4	6	1
7	(Spain) Roberto Carballés Baena	6	3	6

Qualifying competition
3	(South Africa) Kevin Anderson	7	4	7^{7}
7	(Spain) Roberto Carballés Baena	5	6	6^{5}

==== Fourth qualifier ====
First round
4	(Germany) Dominik Koepfer	7^{8}	6
Alt	(Australia) Alex Bolt	6^{6}	1
WC	(Austria) Alexander Erler	7^{7}	2	4
5	(Italy) Gianluca Mager	6^{2}	6	6

Qualifying competition
4	(Germany) Dominik Koepfer	3	6	3
5	(Italy) Gianluca Mager	6	3	6
