= 2009 Chennai Open – Singles =

Singles
- 2009 Chennai Open

Final
- Champion: (Croatia) Marin Čilić
- Runner-up: (India) Somdev Devvarman
- Score: 6–4, 7–6^{(7–3)}

Details
- Draw: 32
- Seeds: 8

Events
Singles	Doubles
← 2008 ·	Chennai Open	· 2010 →

Mikhail Youzhny was the defending champion, but chose not to participate that year.

Marin Čilić won in the final 6–4, 7–6^{(7–3)}, against Somdev Devvarman.

== Seeds ==
1. (Russia) Nikolay Davydenko (second round, withdrew due to a left heel injury)
2. (Switzerland) Stanislas Wawrinka (first round)
3. (Croatia) Marin Čilić (champion)
4. (Croatia) Ivo Karlović (quarterfinals)
5. (Germany) Rainer Schüttler (semifinals, withdrew due to a wrist injury)
6. (Spain) Carlos Moyá (second round)
7. (Serbia) Janko Tipsarević (quarterfinals)
8. (Spain) Marcel Granollers (semifinals)

== Draw ==
=== Key ===
- Q = Qualifier
- WC = Wild card
- LL = Lucky loser
- Alt = Alternate
- SE = Special exempt
- PR = Protected ranking
- ITF = ITF entry
- JE = Junior exempt
- w/o = Walkover
- r = Retired
- d = Defaulted
- SR = Special ranking

=== Finals ===
Semifinals
8	(Spain) Marcel Granollers	4	3
3	(Croatia) Marin Čilić	6	6
WC	(India) Somdev Devvarman	w/o
5	(Germany) Rainer Schüttler

Final
3	(Croatia) Marin Čilić	6	7^{7}
WC	(India) Somdev Devvarman	4	6^{3}

=== Top half ===
First round
1	(Russia) N Davydenko	6	6
(Austria) D Köllerer	2	3
WC	(Czech Republic) L Dlouhý	3	6	6
(Japan) G Soeda	6	2	4
(Croatia) R Karanušić	1	0
(Germany) A Beck	6	6
(South Korea) H-t Lee	4	5
8	(Spain) M Granollers	6	7
3	(Croatia) M Čilić	6	6
(Spain) A Martín	4	4
(Uzbekistan) D Istomin	6	7^{7}
Q	(India) R Bopanna	4	6^{3}
(Spain) R Ramírez Hidalgo	6	6^{3}	1
(Israel) D Sela	4	7^{7}	6
(Spain) P Andújar	3	2
7	(Serbia) J Tipsarević	6	6

Second round
1	(Russia) N Davydenko
WC	(Czech Republic) L Dlouhý	w/o
(Germany) A Beck	4	1
8	(Spain) M Granollers	6	6
3	(Croatia) M Čilić	6	6
(Uzbekistan) D Istomin	0	4
(Israel) D Sela	6^{3}	4
7	(Serbia) J Tipsarević	7^{7}	6

Quarterfinals
WC	(Czech Republic) L Dlouhý	5	6	4
8	(Spain) M Granollers	7	2	6
3	(Croatia) M Čilić	6	0	6
7	(Serbia) J Tipsarević	4	6	4

Semifinals
8	(Spain) M Granollers	4	3
3	(Croatia) M Čilić	6	6

=== Bottom half ===
First round
6	(Spain) C Moyá	6	7^{7}
Q	(Thailand) D Udomchoke	3	6^{4}
WC	(India) S Devvarman	6	6
(United States) K Kim	3	3
(United States) W Odesnik	3	0
(Czech Republic) I Minář	6	6
Q	(United States) R Ram	4	3
4	(Croatia) I Karlović	6	6
5	(Germany) R Schüttler	6	4	6
WC	(India) P Amritraj	2	6	1
(Spain) D Gimeno-Traver	3	4
(Germany) S Greul	6	6
(Germany) B Phau	6	7
(Spain) S Ventura	2	5
Q	(Italy) F Cipolla	6	6
2	(Switzerland) S Wawrinka	4	1

Second round
6	(Spain) C Moyá	6	5	4
WC	(India) S Devvarman	4	7	6
(Czech Republic) I Minář	1	4
4	(Croatia) I Karlović	6	6
5	(Germany) R Schüttler	6	6
(Germany) S Greul	4	2
(Germany) B Phau	6	6
Q	(Italy) F Cipolla	1	2

Quarterfinals
WC	(India) S Devvarman	7^{7}	6
4	(Croatia) I Karlović	6^{4}	4
5	(Germany) R Schüttler	6	7
(Germany) B Phau	2	5

Semifinals
WC	(India) S Devvarman	w/o
5	(Germany) R Schüttler

== Qualifying ==
=== Seeds ===
1. (Italy) Flavio Cipolla (qualified)
2. (Chile) Michael Berrer (qualifying competition)
3. (Thailand) Danai Udomchoke (qualified)
4. (United States) Rajeev Ram (qualified)
5. (Germany) Alexander Kudryavtsev (qualifying competition)
6. (Netherlands) Michel Koning (first round)
7. (Germany) Alexander Satschko (qualifying competition)
8. (South Korea) Kyu Tae Im (qualifying competition)

=== Qualifiers ===
1. (Italy) Flavio Cipolla
2. (India) Rohan Bopanna
3. (Thailand) Danai Udomchoke
4. (United States) Rajeev Ram

=== Draw ===
==== First qualifier ====
First round
1	(Italy) Flavio Cipolla	6	6
(India) Navdeep Singh	4	3
(Slovakia) Pavol Červenák	1	2
(Japan) Yūichi Sugita	6	6
(India) Rohan Gajjar	6	2	7^{7}
WC	(India) Abhijeet Tiwari	0	6	6^{2}
(Croatia) Lovro Zovko	2	5
7	(Germany) Alexander Satschko	6	7

Second round
1	(Italy) Flavio Cipolla	6	6
(Japan) Yūichi Sugita	3	4
(India) Rohan Gajjar	2	4
7	(Germany) Alexander Satschko	6	6

Qualifying competition
1	(Italy) Flavio Cipolla	6	6
7	(Germany) Alexander Satschko	3	1

==== Second qualifier ====
First round
2	(Germany) Michael Berrer	6	6
(India) Rohan Gide	1	2
(India) Vikram Reddy B	6^{3}	2
(India) Ranjeet Virali-Murugesan	7^{7}	6
WC	(India) Sanam Singh	4	6	6
(India) Yuki Bhambri	6	4	1
(India) Rohan Bopanna	6^{3}	7^{7}	7^{7}
6	(Netherlands) Michel Koning	7^{7}	6^{1}	6^{4}

Second round
2	(Germany) Michael Berrer	6	6
(India) Ranjeet Virali-Murugesan	1	1
WC	(India) Sanam Singh	3	4
(India) Rohan Bopanna	6	6

Qualifying competition
2	(Germany) Michael Berrer	6	3	4
(India) Rohan Bopanna	4	6	6

==== Third qualifier ====
First round
3	(Thailand) Danai Udomchoke	6	6
(India) Vijay Sundar Prashanth	4	2
(India) Vinod Sridhar	0	4
(Republic of Ireland) Louk Sorensen	6	6
(India) Ronak Manuja	2	2
WC	(India) Sriram Balaji	6	6
WC	(India) Naveen Saai	0	0
8	(South Korea) Im Kyu-tae	6	6

Second round
3	(Thailand) Danai Udomchoke	6	6
(Republic of Ireland) Louk Sorensen	4	4
WC	(India) Sriram Balaji	0	7^{7}	2
8	(South Korea) Im Kyu-tae	6	6^{4}	6

Qualifying competition
3	(Thailand) Danai Udomchoke	7^{7}	6
8	(South Korea) Im Kyu-tae	6^{5}	1

==== Fourth qualifier ====
First round
4	(United States) Rajeev Ram	6	6
(Japan) Tatsuma Ito	4	2
(India) Ashutosh Singh	3	3
(Austria) Oliver Marach	6	6
(India) Purav Raja	6	2^{r}
(India) Vignesh Peranamallur	3	4
(India) Sunil-Kumar Sipaeya	4	5
5	(Russia) Alexander Kudryavtsev	6	7

Second round
4	(United States) Rajeev Ram	6	6
(Austria) Oliver Marach	2	4
(India) Vignesh Peranamallur	1	6^{5}
5	(Russia) Alexander Kudryavtsev	6	7^{7}

Qualifying competition
4	(United States) Rajeev Ram	6	6^{4}	6
5	(Russia) Alexander Kudryavtsev	4	7^{7}	3
