= 2010 Aircel Chennai Open – Singles =

Singles
- 2010 Aircel Chennai Open

Final
- Champion: (Croatia) Marin Čilić
- Runner-up: (Switzerland) Stanislas Wawrinka
- Score: 7–6^{(7–2)}, 7–6^{(7–3)}

Details
- Draw: 32 (4 Q / 3 WC )
- Seeds: 8

Events
Singles	Doubles
← 2009 ·	Aircel Chennai Open	· 2011 →

Marin Čilić was the defending champion, and won in the final over Stanislas Wawrinka, 7–6^{(7–2)}, 7–6^{(7–3)}.

== Seeds ==
1. (Sweden) Robin Söderling (first round)
2. (Croatia) Marin Čilić (champion)
3. (Switzerland) Stanislas Wawrinka (final)
4. (Serbia) Janko Tipsarević (semifinals)
5. (Israel) Dudi Sela (semifinals)
6. (Germany) Simon Greul (first round)
7. (Germany) Michael Berrer (quarterfinals)
8. (United States) Rajeev Ram (first round)

== Draw ==
=== Key ===
- Q = Qualifier
- WC = Wild card
- LL = Lucky loser
- Alt = Alternate
- SE = Special exempt
- PR = Protected ranking
- ITF = ITF entry
- JE = Junior exempt
- w/o = Walkover
- r = Retired
- d = Defaulted
- SR = Special ranking

=== Finals ===
Semifinals
5	(Israel) Dudi Sela	4	6	5
3	(Switzerland) Stanislas Wawrinka	6	2	7
4	(Serbia) Janko Tipsarević	1	3
2	(Croatia) Marin Čilić	6	6

Final
3	(Switzerland) Stanislas Wawrinka	6^{2}	6^{3}
2	(Croatia) Marin Čilić	7^{7}	7^{7}

=== Top half ===
First round
1	(Sweden) R Söderling	4	5
(United States) R Ginepri	6	7
(Chinese Taipei) Y-h Lu	4	3
(Slovakia) L Lacko	6	6
(Germany) D Brands	2	2
(United States) K Kim	6	6
(Uzbekistan) D Istomin	1	2
5	(Israel) D Sela	6	6
3	(Switzerland) S Wawrinka	6	6
WC	(India) R Bopanna	1	4
Q	(India) P Amritaj	3	1
(United States) M Russell	6	6
Q	(Republic of Ireland) L Sorensen	2	1
(France) S Robert	6	6
(Spain) S Ventura	3	2
7	(Germany) M Berrer	6	6

Second round
(United States) R Ginepri	6^{3}	4
(Slovakia) L Lacko	7^{7}	6
(United States) K Kim	6^{3}	2
5	(Israel) D Sela	7^{7}	6
3	(Switzerland) S Wawrinka	6	6
(United States) M Russell	3	4
(France) S Robert	6^{7}	3
7	(Germany) M Berrer	7^{9}	6

Quarterfinals
(Slovakia) L Lacko	6^{3}	5
5	(Israel) D Sela	7^{7}	7
3	(Switzerland) S Wawrinka	7^{7}	6
7	(Germany) M Berrer	6^{5}	4

Semifinals
5	(Israel) D Sela	4	6	5
3	(Switzerland) S Wawrinka	6	2	7

=== Bottom half ===
First round
8	(United States) R Ram	1	1
(Netherlands) T de Bakker	6	6
(Netherlands) R Haase	6	6
Q	(Chinese Taipei) T-h Yang	4	3
WC	(India) S Devvarman	7	6
(Germany) R Schüttler	5	2
WC	(Spain) C Moyá	3	6^{2}
4	(Serbia) J Tipsarević	6	7^{7}
6	(Germany) S Greul	6	2	4
(Czech Republic) J Hájek	3	6	6
(Colombia) S Giraldo	6	6^{6}	6
(Germany) B Phau	4	7^{8}	3
(Spain) M Granollers	5	6	6
Q	(United Kingdom) J Ward	7	2	2
(Russia) I Kunitsyn	2	4
2	(Croatia) M Čilić	6	6

Second round
(Netherlands) T de Bakker	6	6
(Netherlands) R Haase	3	4
WC	(India) S Devvarman	2	1
4	(Serbia) J Tipsarević	6	6
(Czech Republic) J Hájek	4	2
(Colombia) S Giraldo	6	6
(Spain) M Granollers	7^{7}	3	4
2	(Croatia) M Čilić	6^{3}	6	6

Quarterfinals
(Netherlands) T de Bakker	5	5
4	(Serbia) J Tipsarević	7	7
(Colombia) S Giraldo	6^{3}	1
2	(Croatia) M Čilić	7^{7}	6

Semifinals
4	(Serbia) J Tipsarević	1	2
2	(Croatia) M Čilić	6	6

== Qualifying ==
=== Seeds ===
1. (Ukraine) Illya Marchenko (second round)
2. (Chile) Paul Capdeville (first round)
3. (Germany) Dustin Brown (qualifying competition)
4. (Turkey) Marsel İlhan (second round)
5. (Germany) Dieter Kindlmann (first round)
6. (Canada) Peter Polansky (second round)
7. (United States) Donald Young (second round)
8. (Japan) Tatsuma Ito (second round)

=== Qualifiers ===
1. (Republic of Ireland) Louk Sorensen
2. (India) Prakash Amritraj
3. (Chinese Taipei) Yang Tsung-hua
4. (United Kingdom) James Ward

=== Draw ===
==== First qualifier ====
First round
1	(Ukraine) Illya Marchenko	6	6
(Germany) Denis Gremelmayr	4	2
(India) Yuki Bhambri	7	6
(India) Ranjeet Virali-Murugesan	5	4
(Monaco) Benjamin Balleret	0	6	2
(Republic of Ireland) Louk Sorensen	6	2	6
(Pakistan) Aisam-ul-Haq Qureshi	4	4
7	(United States) Donald Young	6	6

Second round
1	(Ukraine) Illya Marchenko	6^{2}	3
(India) Yuki Bhambri	7^{7}	6
(Republic of Ireland) Louk Sorensen	7^{7}	7^{10}
7	(United States) Donald Young	6^{4}	6^{8}

Qualifying competition
(India) Yuki Bhambri	2	7^{8}	2
(Republic of Ireland) Louk Sorensen	6	6^{6}	6

==== Second qualifier ====
First round
2	(Chile) Paul Capdeville	4	6	1
(Germany) Lars Pörschke	6	4	6
(South Africa) Rik de Voest	6	7
(Switzerland) George Bastl	2	5
(India) Prakash Amritraj	7	6
(India) Vishnu Vardhan	5	3
(India) Rohan Gajjar	3	6^{8}
6	(Canada) Peter Polansky	6	7^{10}

Second round
(Germany) Lars Pörschke	4	6	7
(South Africa) Rik de Voest	6	3	5
(India) Prakash Amritraj	4	6	7^{11}
6	(Canada) Peter Polansky	6	3	6^{9}

Qualifying competition
(Germany) Lars Pörschke	6^{5}	3
(India) Prakash Amritraj	7^{7}	6

==== Third qualifier ====
First round
3	(Germany) Dustin Brown	6	6
(United States) Todd Widom	4	3
WC	(India) Mohit Mayur Jayaprakash	4	2
(Czech Republic) Jan Minář	6	6
(Germany) Matthias Bachinger	2	2^{r}
(Italy) Riccardo Ghedin	6	4
(Chinese Taipei) Yang Tsung-hua	6^{6}	7^{7}	6
5	(Germany) Dieter Kindlmann	7^{8}	6^{3}	4

Second round
3	(Germany) Dustin Brown	6	6
(Czech Republic) Jan Minář	4	4
(Italy) Riccardo Ghedin	3	4
(Chinese Taipei) Yang Tsung-hua	6	6

Qualifying competition
3	(Germany) Dustin Brown	2	5
(Chinese Taipei) Yang Tsung-hua	6	7

==== Fourth qualifier ====
First round
4	(Turkey) Marsel İlhan	7	3	6
WC	(India) Sanam Singh	5	6	2
WC	(Hong Kong) Karan Rastogi	2	4
(United Kingdom) James Ward	6	6
(Israel) Noam Okun	6	6
WC	(India) Sriram Balaji	2	3
(Russia) Alex Bogomolov Jr.	6^{1}	3
8	(Japan) Tatsuma Ito	7^{7}	6

Second round
4	(Turkey) Marsel İlhan	6	2	4
(United Kingdom) James Ward	3	6	6
(Israel) Noam Okun	6	6
8	(Japan) Tatsuma Ito	2	2

Qualifying competition
(United Kingdom) James Ward	6	6
(Israel) Noam Okun	2	3
