= 2021 St. Petersburg Open – Doubles =

Doubles
- 2021 St. Petersburg Open

Final
- Champions: (United Kingdom) Jamie Murray (Brazil) Bruno Soares
- Runners-up: (Kazakhstan) Andrey Golubev (Monaco) Hugo Nys
- Score: 6–3, 6–4

Events
Singles	Doubles
- St. Petersburg Open

Jürgen Melzer and Édouard Roger-Vasselin were the defending champions, but Roger-Vasselin chose not to participate and Melzer chose to compete in Vienna instead.

Jamie Murray and Bruno Soares won the title, defeating Andrey Golubev and Hugo Nys in the final, 6–3, 6–4.

== Seeds ==
1. (United Kingdom) Jamie Murray / (Brazil) Bruno Soares (champions)
2. (South Africa) Raven Klaasen / (Japan) Ben McLachlan (first round)
3. (El Salvador) Marcelo Arévalo / (Netherlands) Matwé Middelkoop (first round)
4. (Kazakhstan) Andrey Golubev / (Monaco) Hugo Nys (final)

== Draw ==
Key

- Q = Qualifier
- WC = Wild card
- LL = Lucky loser
- Alt = Alternate
- ITF = ITF entry
- PR = Protected ranking
- SR = Special ranking
- SE = Special exempt
- JE = Junior exempt
- JR = Junior Accelerator Programme entrant
- CO = College Accelerator Programme entrant
- NG = Next Gen Accelerator Program entrant
- w/o = Walkover
- r = Retired
- d = Defaulted

=== Draw ===
First round
1	(United Kingdom) J Murray (Brazil) B Soares	6	6
WC	(Israel) J Erlich (Belarus) A Vasilevski	1	4
PR	(United Kingdom) D Inglot (United Kingdom) K Skupski	4	5
(Australia) L Saville (Australia) J-P Smith	6	7
3	(El Salvador) M Arévalo (Netherlands) M Middelkoop	6	5	[7]
(New Zealand) M Daniell (Brazil) M Demoliner	3	7	[10]
(Uruguay) A Behar (Ecuador) G Escobar	4	5
(United States) T Fritz (United States) T Paul	6	7
(Bosnia and Herzegovina) T Brkić (Serbia) N Ćaćić	4	6	[7]
(Mexico) S González (Argentina) A Molteni	6	2	[10]
(Kazakhstan) A Bublik (Belarus) I Ivashka	3	1
4	(Kazakhstan) A Golubev (Monaco) H Nys	6	6
(Russia) K Khachanov (Russia) A Rublev	6	6
WC	(Russia) D Golubev (Russia) E Tiurnev	1	1
(India) R Bopanna (Canada) D Shapovalov	7	6
2	(South Africa) R Klaasen (Japan) B McLachlan	5	4

Quarterfinals
1	(United Kingdom) J Murray (Brazil) B Soares	7^{7}	3	[10]
(Australia) L Saville (Australia) J-P Smith	6^{0}	6	[6]
(New Zealand) M Daniell (Brazil) M Demoliner	6	3	[10]
(United States) T Fritz (United States) T Paul	0	6	[7]
(Mexico) S González (Argentina) A Molteni	6^{4}	3
4	(Kazakhstan) A Golubev (Monaco) H Nys	7^{7}	6
(Russia) K Khachanov (Russia) A Rublev	4	7	[7]
(India) R Bopanna (Canada) D Shapovalov	6	5	[10]

Semifinals
1	(United Kingdom) J Murray (Brazil) B Soares	7	6
(New Zealand) M Daniell (Brazil) M Demoliner	5	3
4	(Kazakhstan) A Golubev (Monaco) H Nys	6	2	[10]
(India) R Bopanna (Canada) D Shapovalov	4	6	[4]

Final
1	(United Kingdom) J Murray (Brazil) B Soares	6	6
4	(Kazakhstan) A Golubev (Monaco) H Nys	3	4
