= 2010 Aircel Chennai Open – Doubles =

Doubles
- 2010 Aircel Chennai Open

Final
- Champions: (Spain) Marcel Granollers (Spain) Santiago Ventura
- Runners-up: (Chinese Taipei) Lu Yen-hsun (Serbia) Janko Tipsarević
- Score: 7–5, 6–2

Details
- Draw: 16
- Seeds: 4

Events
Singles	Doubles
← 2009 ·	Aircel Chennai Open	· 2011 →

Eric Butorac and Rajeev Ram were the defending champions, but lost in the first round to Yves Allegro and Stanislas Wawrinka.

In the final, Marcel Granollers and Santiago Ventura defeated Lu Yen-hsun and Janko Tipsarević, 7–5, 6–2.

== Seeds ==
1. (United States) Eric Butorac / (United States) Rajeev Ram (first round)
2. (Spain) Marcel Granollers / (Spain) Santiago Ventura (champions)
3. (India) Mahesh Bhupathi / (India) Rohan Bopanna (quarterfinals)
4. (South Africa) Rik de Voest / (United States) Scott Lipsky (first round)

== Draw ==
Key

- Q = Qualifier
- WC = Wild card
- LL = Lucky loser
- Alt = Alternate
- ITF = ITF entry
- PR = Protected ranking
- SR = Special ranking
- SE = Special exempt
- JE = Junior exempt
- JR = Junior Accelerator Programme entrant
- CO = College Accelerator Programme entrant
- NG = Next Gen Accelerator Program entrant
- w/o = Walkover
- r = Retired
- d = Defaulted

=== Draw ===
First round
1	(United States) E Butorac (United States) R Ram	6	4	[5]
(Switzerland) Y Allegro (Switzerland) S Wawrinka	3	6	[10]
(Chinese Taipei) Y-h Lu (Serbia) J Tipsarević	6	7
(Germany) M Berrer (Germany) S Greul	2	5
4	(South Africa) R de Voest (United States) S Lipsky	2	5
WC	(India) S Devvarman (India) S Singh	6	7
(South Africa) J Coetzee (Netherlands) R Wassen	6	6
(Russia) I Kunitsyn (Pakistan) A-u-H Qureshi	4	0
(United Kingdom) C Fleming (United Kingdom) K Skupski	6	6
(Czech Republic) J Hájek (Slovakia) L Lacko	4	4
(United States) J Cerretani (United States) T Rettenmaier	3	6^{5}
3	(India) M Bhupathi (India) R Bopanna	6	7^{7}
WC	(India) Y Bhambri (Spain) C Moyá	6	4	[10]
(United States) R Ginepri (Israel) D Sela	2	6	[5]
(Germany) M Kohlmann (Germany) R Schüttler	6^{5}	3
2	(Spain) M Granollers (Spain) S Ventura	7^{7}	6

Quarterfinals
(Switzerland) Y Allegro (Switzerland) S Wawrinka	2	2
(Chinese Taipei) Y-h Lu (Serbia) J Tipsarević	6	6
WC	(India) S Devvarman (India) S Singh	6	6
(South Africa) J Coetzee (Netherlands) R Wassen	2	3
(United Kingdom) C Fleming (United Kingdom) K Skupski	4	6	[10]
3	(India) M Bhupathi (India) R Bopanna	6	3	[2]
WC	(India) Y Bhambri (Spain) C Moyá	5	1
2	(Spain) M Granollers (Spain) S Ventura	7	6

Semifinals
(Chinese Taipei) Y-h Lu (Serbia) J Tipsarević	6	4	[10]
WC	(India) S Devvarman (India) S Singh	3	6	[5]
(United Kingdom) C Fleming (United Kingdom) K Skupski	6	3	[8]
2	(Spain) M Granollers (Spain) S Ventura	3	6	[10]

Finals
(Chinese Taipei) Y-h Lu (Serbia) J Tipsarević	5	2
2	(Spain) M Granollers (Spain) S Ventura	7	6
