= 2011 Aircel Chennai Open – Doubles =

Doubles
- 2011 Aircel Chennai Open

Final
- Champions: (India) Mahesh Bhupathi (India) Leander Paes
- Runners-up: (Netherlands) Robin Haase (United States) David Martin
- Score: 6–2, 6–7^{(3–7)}, [10–7]

Details
- Draw: 16
- Seeds: 4

Events
Singles	Doubles
← 2010 ·	Aircel Chennai Open	· 2012 →

Marcel Granollers and Santiago Ventura were the defending champions but decided not to participate.
Mahesh Bhupathi and Leander Paes clinched the title. They defeated Robin Haase and David Martin 6–2, 6–7^{(3–7)}, [10–7] in the final.

== Seeds ==
1. (India) Mahesh Bhupathi / (India) Leander Paes (champions)
2. (India) Rohan Bopanna / (Pakistan) Aisam-ul-Haq Qureshi (quarterfinals)
3. (Germany) Dustin Brown / (Netherlands) Rogier Wassen (first round)
4. (United Kingdom) Colin Fleming / (United Kingdom) Ross Hutchins (first round)

== Draw ==
=== Key ===
- Q = Qualifier
- WC = Wild card
- LL = Lucky loser
- Alt = Alternate
- SE = Special exempt
- PR = Protected ranking
- ITF = ITF entry
- JE = Junior exempt
- w/o = Walkover
- r = Retired
- d = Defaulted
- SR = Special ranking

=== Draw ===
First round
1	(India) M Bhupathi (India) L Paes	3	7^{10}	[10]
(Canada) F Dancevic (Switzerland) S Wawrinka	6	6^{8}	[4]
(Belgium) X Malisse (United Kingdom) J Murray	3	1
(Germany) P Marx (United Kingdom) K Skupski	6	6
4	(United Kingdom) C Fleming (United Kingdom) R Hutchins	6^{7}	1
(Thailand) Sa Ratiwatana (Thailand) So Ratiwatana	7^{7}	6
(Croatia) M Čilić (Croatia) I Dodig	6	7
(Czech Republic) L Friedl (Australia) J Kerr	0	5
WC	(India) D Sharan (India) V Vardhan	2	2
(Italy) S Bolelli (Serbia) J Tipsarević	6	6
(United States) S Lipsky (United States) R Ram	6	6
3	(Germany) D Brown (Netherlands) R Wassen	1	2
WC	(India) S Devvarman (India) S Singh	7	2	[8]
(Netherlands) R Haase (United States) D Martin	5	6	[10]
(Brazil) M Daniel (Argentina) E Schwank	3	6^{3}
2	(India) R Bopanna (Pakistan) A-u-H Qureshi	6	7^{7}

Quarterfinals
1	(India) M Bhupathi (India) L Paes	6	7^{7}
(Germany) P Marx (United Kingdom) K Skupski	4	6^{3}
(Thailand) Sa Ratiwatana (Thailand) So Ratiwatana	2	4
(Croatia) M Čilić (Croatia) I Dodig	6	6
(Italy) S Bolelli (Serbia) J Tipsarević	6	6
(United States) S Lipsky (United States) R Ram	4	2
(Netherlands) R Haase (United States) D Martin	6	7
2	(India) R Bopanna (Pakistan) A-u-H Qureshi	4	5

Semifinals
1	(India) M Bhupathi (India) L Paes	6	6^{4}	[10]
(Croatia) M Čilić (Croatia) I Dodig	1	7^{7}	[5]
(Italy) S Bolelli (Serbia) J Tipsarević	6	3	[7]
(Netherlands) R Haase (United States) D Martin	2	6	[10]

Final
1	(India) M Bhupathi (India) L Paes	6	6^{3}	[10]
(Netherlands) R Haase (United States) D Martin	2	7^{7}	[7]
