= 2021 St. Petersburg Open =

Tennis tournament

- Date: October 25–31
- Edition: 26th
- Category: ATP World Tour 250 Series
- Draw: 32S / 16D
- Prize money: $863,705
- Surface: Hard (indoor)
- Location: St. Petersburg, Russia
- Venue: Sibur Arena

Champions

Singles
- (Croatia) Marin Čilić

Doubles
- (United Kingdom) Jamie Murray / (Brazil) Bruno Soares
- St. Petersburg Open

The 2021 St. Petersburg Open was a tennis tournament played on indoor hard courts. It was the 26th edition of the St. Petersburg Open, and part of the ATP World Tour 250 Series of the 2021 ATP Tour. It took place at the Sibur Arena in Saint Petersburg, Russia, from October 25 through 31, 2021.

== Champions ==
=== Singles ===
(Croatia) Marin Čilić def. (United States) Taylor Fritz, 7–6^{(7–3)}, 4–6, 6–4

=== Doubles ===
(United Kingdom) Jamie Murray / (Brazil) Bruno Soares def. (Kazakhstan) Andrey Golubev / (Monaco) Hugo Nys, 6–3, 6–4

== Singles main-draw entrants ==
=== Seeds ===
Country	Player	Rank^{1}	Seed
RUS	Andrey Rublev	6	1
CAN	Denis Shapovalov	14	2
ESP	Roberto Bautista Agut	20	3
RUS	Aslan Karatsev	22	4
USA	Taylor Fritz	30	5
RUS	Karen Khachanov	31	6
KAZ	Alexander Bublik	35	7
USA	Sebastian Korda	38	8

- Rankings are as of 18 October 2021

=== Other entrants ===
The following players received wildcards into the singles main draw:

- (Israel) Yshai Oliel
- (Croatia) Nino Serdarušić
- (Russia) Evgenii Tiurnev

The following player received entry using a protected ranking:

- (Spain) Pablo Andújar

The following players received entry from the qualifying draw:

- (Belarus) Egor Gerasimov
- (Japan) Yoshihito Nishioka
- (Finland) Emil Ruusuvuori
- (Netherlands) Botic van de Zandschulp

== Doubles main-draw entrants ==
=== Seeds ===
Country	Player	Country	Player	Rank^{1}	Seed
GBR	Jamie Murray	BRA	Bruno Soares	33	1
RSA	Raven Klaasen	JPN	Ben McLachlan	54	2
ESA	Marcelo Arévalo	NED	Matwé Middelkoop	71	3
KAZ	Andrey Golubev	MON	Hugo Nys	87	4

- Rankings are as of October 18, 2021

=== Other entrants ===
The following pairs received wildcards into the doubles main draw:

- (Israel) Jonathan Erlich / (Belarus) Andrei Vasilevski
- (Russia) Daniil Golubev / (Russia) Evgenii Tiurnev
