= 2021 St. Petersburg Open – Singles =

Singles
- 2021 St. Petersburg Open

Final
- Champion: (Croatia) Marin Čilić
- Runner-up: (United States) Taylor Fritz
- Score: 7–6^{(7–3)}, 4–6, 6–4

Details
- Draw: 28 (4 Q / 3 WC )
- Seeds: 8

Events
Singles	Doubles
← 2020 ·	St. Petersburg Open	· 2022 →

Andrey Rublev was the defending champion, but lost in the quarterfinals to Botic van de Zandschulp.

Marin Čilić won the title, defeating Taylor Fritz in the final, 7–6^{(7–3)}, 4–6, 6–4.

== Seeds ==
The top four seeds received a bye into the second round.

1. (Russia) Andrey Rublev (quarterfinals)
2. (Canada) Denis Shapovalov (quarterfinals)
3. (Spain) Roberto Bautista Agut (quarterfinals)
4. (Russia) Aslan Karatsev (second round)
5. (United States) Taylor Fritz (final)
6. (Russia) Karen Khachanov (second round)
7. (Kazakhstan) Alexander Bublik (second round)
8. (United States) Sebastian Korda (second round)

== Draw ==
=== Key ===
- Q = Qualifier
- WC = Wild card
- LL = Lucky loser
- Alt = Alternate
- SE = Special exempt
- PR = Protected ranking
- ITF = ITF entry
- JE = Junior exempt
- w/o = Walkover
- r = Retired
- d = Defaulted
- SR = Special ranking

=== Finals ===
Semifinals
Q	(Netherlands) Botic van de Zandschulp	3	3
(Croatia) Marin Čilić	6	6
5	(United States) Taylor Fritz	5	6	6
(Germany) Jan-Lennard Struff	7	1	3

Final
(Croatia) Marin Čilić	7^{7}	4	6
5	(United States) Taylor Fritz	6^{3}	6	4

=== Top half ===
First round
(Serbia) L Đere	3	2
(Belarus) I Ivashka	6	6
Q	(Netherlands) B van de Zandschulp	6	6
Q	(Japan) Y Nishioka	2	2
WC	(Croatia) N Serdarušić	6^{2}	5
8	(United States) S Korda	7^{7}	7
Q	(Belarus) E Gerasimov	5	4
(United States) M McDonald	7	6
(Croatia) M Čilić	6	6
(Spain) A Ramos Viñolas	2	3
(France) A Mannarino	3	3
6	(Russia) K Khachanov	6	6

Second round
1	(Russia) A Rublev	6	6
(Belarus) I Ivashka	4	4
Q	(Netherlands) B van de Zandschulp	6	7
8	(United States) S Korda	2	5
3	(Spain) R Bautista Agut	6	6
(United States) M McDonald	3	2
(Croatia) M Čilić	6	6^{1}	6
6	(Russia) K Khachanov	4	7^{7}	4

Quarterfinals
1	(Russia) A Rublev	3	4
Q	(Netherlands) B van de Zandschulp	6	6
3	(Spain) R Bautista Agut	4	6	3
(Croatia) M Čilić	6	3	6

Semifinals
Q	(Netherlands) B van de Zandschulp	3	3
(Croatia) M Čilić	6	6

=== Bottom half ===
First round
5	(United States) T Fritz	6	6
Q	(Finland) E Ruusuvuori	1	4
(Spain) P Martínez	3	2
(United States) T Paul	6	6
(Australia) J Millman	6	6
WC	(Israel) Y Oliel	1	1
7	(Kazakhstan) A Bublik	6	6
WC	(Russia) E Tiurnev	3	4
(Germany) J-L Struff	7^{7}	6
(Australia) J Duckworth	6^{3}	3
(Argentina) F Delbonis	2	6^{1}
PR	(Spain) P Andújar	6	7^{7}

Second round
5	(United States) T Fritz	7^{7}	6
(United States) T Paul	6^{3}	4
(Australia) J Millman	6	6
4	(Russia) A Karatsev	3	2
7	(Kazakhstan) A Bublik	4	3
(Germany) J-L Struff	6	6
PR	(Spain) P Andújar	6	3	0
2	(Canada) D Shapovalov	2	6	6

Quarterfinals
5	(United States) T Fritz	6	6
(Australia) J Millman	4	2
(Germany) J-L Struff	6	6
2	(Canada) D Shapovalov	4	3

Semifinals
5	(United States) T Fritz	5	6	6
(Germany) J-L Struff	7	1	3

== Qualifying ==
=== Seeds ===
1. (Netherlands) Botic van de Zandschulp (qualified)
2. (France) Benjamin Bonzi (first round)
3. (Argentina) Federico Coria (first round)
4. (Serbia) Miomir Kecmanović (qualifying competition)
5. (Finland) Emil Ruusuvuori (qualified)
6. (Japan) Yoshihito Nishioka (qualified)
7. (Sweden) Mikael Ymer (first round)
8. (Belarus) Egor Gerasimov (qualified)

=== Qualifiers ===
1. (Netherlands) Botic van de Zandschulp
2. (Finland) Emil Ruusuvuori
3. (Belarus) Egor Gerasimov
4. (Japan) Yoshihito Nishioka

=== Qualifying draw ===
==== First qualifier ====
First round
1	(Netherlands) Botic van de Zandschulp	6
Alt	(Australia) Marc Polmans	6^{r}
Alt	(Russia) Evgeny Donskoy	6	7
7	(Sweden) Mikael Ymer	2	5

Qualifying competition
1	(Netherlands) Botic van de Zandschulp	5	6	6
Alt	(Russia) Evgeny Donskoy	7	3	2

==== Second qualifier ====
First round
2	(France) Benjamin Bonzi	6	6^{4}	2
WC	(Kazakhstan) Dmitry Popko	4	7^{7}	6
PR	(France) Gilles Simon	0	3
5	(Finland) Emil Ruusuvuori	6	6

Qualifying competition
WC	(Kazakhstan) Dmitry Popko	6^{2}	4
5	(Finland) Emil Ruusuvuori	7^{7}	6

==== Third qualifier ====
First round
3	(Argentina) Federico Coria	3	4
(Moldova) Radu Albot	6	6
(Bosnia and Herzegovina) Damir Džumhur	1	6^{6}
8	(Belarus) Egor Gerasimov	6	7^{8}

Qualifying competition
(Moldova) Radu Albot	6^{2}	4
8	(Belarus) Egor Gerasimov	7^{7}	6

==== Fourth qualifier ====
First round
4	(Serbia) Miomir Kecmanović	2	6	6
WC	(Russia) Evgeny Karlovskiy	6	4	1
Alt	(Russia) Roman Safiullin	5	2
6	(Japan) Yoshihito Nishioka	7	6

Qualifying competition
4	(Serbia) Miomir Kecmanović	3	6	2
6	(Japan) Yoshihito Nishioka	6	4	6
