= 2010 Aircel Chennai Open =

- Date: 4–10 January
- Edition: 15th
- Category: 250 series
- Draw: 32S / 16D
- Prize money: $398,250
- Surface: Hard / outdoors
- Location: Chennai, India
- Venue: SDAT Tennis Stadium

Champions

Singles
- (Croatia) Marin Čilić

Doubles
- (Spain) Marcel Granollers / (Spain) Santiago Ventura
← 2009 ·	Aircel Chennai Open	· 2011 →

The 2010 Aircel Chennai Open was a tennis tournament played on outdoor hard courts. It is the 15th edition of the Chennai Open, and part of the 250 series of the 2010 ATP World Tour. It takes place at the SDAT Tennis Stadium in Chennai, India, from 4 January through 10 January 2010. Second-seeded Marin Čilić won the singles title.

== ATP entrants ==
=== Seeds ===
Country	Player	Rank^{1}	Seed
SWE	Robin Söderling	8	1
CRO	Marin Čilić	14	2
SUI	Stanislas Wawrinka	21	3
SRB	Janko Tipsarević	38	4
ISR	Dudi Sela	43	5
GER	Simon Greul	59	6
GER	Michael Berrer	74	7
USA	Rajeev Ram	79	8

=== Other entrants ===
The following players received wildcards into the singles main draw:

- (India) Rohan Bopanna
- (India) Somdev Devvarman
- (Spain) Carlos Moyá

The following players received entry from the qualifying draw:

- (India) Prakash Amritraj
- (Republic of Ireland) Louk Sorensen
- (United Kingdom) James Ward
- (Chinese Taipei) Yang Tsung-hua

== Finals ==
=== Singles ===
(Croatia) Marin Čilić defeated (Switzerland) Stanislas Wawrinka, 7–6^{(7–2)}, 7–6^{(7–3)}.

- It was Cilic's first title of the year, fourth overall, and his second consecutive title at the event.

=== Doubles ===
(Spain) Marcel Granollers / (Spain) Santiago Ventura defeated (Chinese Taipei) Lu Yen-hsun / (Serbia) Janko Tipsarević, 7–5, 6–2.
