= 2009 Chennai Open – Doubles =

Doubles
- 2009 Chennai Open

Final
- Champions: (United States) Eric Butorac; (United States) Rajeev Ram
- Runners-up: (Switzerland) Jean-Claude Scherrer; (Switzerland) Stanislas Wawrinka
- Score: 6–3, 6–4

Details
- Draw: 16
- Seeds: 4

Events
Singles	Doubles
← 2008 ·	Chennai Open	· 2010 →

Sanchai Ratiwatana and Sonchat Ratiwatana were the defending champions, but chose not participate that year.

Eric Butorac and Rajeev Ram won in the final, 6–3, 6–4, over Jean-Claude Scherrer and Stanislas Wawrinka.

== Seeds ==
1. (India) Mahesh Bhupathi / (The Bahamas) Mark Knowles (quarterfinals)
2. (Czech Republic) Lukáš Dlouhý / (India) Leander Paes (first round)
3. (Netherlands) Rogier Wassen / (Croatia) Lovro Zovko (quarterfinals)
4. (United States) Scott Lipsky / (United States) David Martin (semifinals)

== Draw ==
=== Key ===
- Q = Qualifier
- WC = Wild card
- LL = Lucky loser
- Alt = Alternate
- SE = Special exempt
- PR = Protected ranking
- ITF = ITF entry
- JE = Junior exempt
- w/o = Walkover
- r = Retired
- d = Defaulted
- SR = Special ranking

=== Draw ===
First round

Quarterfinals

Semifinals

Final

1
- (India) M Bhupathi
- (The Bahamas) M Knowles
7^{7}
7^{10}

WC
- (India) P Amritraj
- (India) S Devvarman
6^{3}
6^{8}

1
- (India) M Bhupathi
- (The Bahamas) M Knowles
6
3
[8]

- (Switzerland) J-C Scherrer
- (Switzerland) S Wawrinka
7^{7}
6

- (Switzerland) J-C Scherrer
- (Switzerland) S Wawrinka
3
6
[10]

- (Switzerland) Y Allegro
- (Romania) H Tecău
6^{5}
4

- (Switzerland) J-C Scherrer
- (Switzerland) S Wawrinka
6
6

4
- (United States) S Lipsky
- (United States) D Martin
7^{11}
6

4
- (United States) S Lipsky
- (United States) D Martin
4
4

- (India) R Bopanna
- (Italy) F Cipolla
6^{9}
3

4
- (United States) S Lipsky
- (United States) D Martin
6^{8}
7
[10]

- (Austria) O Marach
- (Serbia) J Tipsarević
3
6
[10]

- (Austria) O Marach
- (Serbia) J Tipsarević
7^{10}
5
[8]

- (Spain) P Andújar
- (Spain) C Moyá
6
3
[4]

- (Switzerland) J-C Scherrer
- (Switzerland) S Wawrinka
3
4

- (United States) E Butorac
- (United States) R Ram
6
6

- (United States) E Butorac
- (United States) R Ram
6
6

WC
- (India) Y Bhambri
- (India) H Mankad
1
2

- (United States) E Butorac
- (United States) R Ram
6
6

- (Spain) A Martín
- (Israel) D Sela
3
1

3
- (Netherlands) R Wassen
- (Croatia) L Zovko
2
3

3
- (Netherlands) R Wassen
- (Croatia) L Zovko
6
6

- (United States) E Butorac
- (United States) R Ram
w/o

- (Spain) D Gimeno Traver
- (Spain) R Ramírez Hidalgo
4
2

- (Germany) B Phau
- (Germany) R Schüttler

- (Spain) M Granollers
- (Spain) S Ventura
6
6

- (Spain) M Granollers
- (Spain) S Ventura
3
7^{7}
[7]

- (Germany) B Phau
- (Germany) R Schüttler
4
6
[10]

- (Germany) B Phau
- (Germany) R Schüttler
6
6^{4}
[10]

2
- (Czech Republic) L Dlouhý
- (India) L Paes
6
2
[7]
