= 2011 Aircel Chennai Open – Singles =

Singles
- 2011 Aircel Chennai Open

Final
- Champion: (Switzerland) Stanislas Wawrinka
- Runner-up: (Belgium) Xavier Malisse
- Score: 7–5, 4–6, 6–1

Details
- Draw: 32 (4 Q / 3 WC )
- Seeds: 8

Events
Singles	Doubles
← 2010 ·	Aircel Chennai Open	· 2012 →

Marin Čilić was the two-time defending champion, but lost in the first round to Kei Nishikori. 3rd seed Stanislas Wawrinka defeated 7th seed Xavier Malisse 7–5, 4–6, 6–1 in the final match.

== Seeds ==
1. (Czech Republic) Tomáš Berdych (semifinals)
2. (Croatia) Marin Čilić (first round)
3. (Switzerland) Stanislas Wawrinka (champion)
4. (France) Richard Gasquet (second round)
5. (France) Jérémy Chardy (first round)
6. (Serbia) Janko Tipsarević (semifinals)
7. (Belgium) Xavier Malisse (final)
8. (Netherlands) Robin Haase (quarterfinals)

== Draw ==
=== Key ===
- Q = Qualifier
- WC = Wild card
- LL = Lucky loser
- Alt = Alternate
- SE = Special exempt
- PR = Protected ranking
- ITF = ITF entry
- JE = Junior exempt
- w/o = Walkover
- r = Retired
- d = Defaulted
- SR = Special ranking

=== Finals ===
Semifinals
1	(Czech Republic) Tomáš Berdych	4	1
3/WC	(Switzerland) Stanislas Wawrinka	6	6
7	(Belgium) Xavier Malisse	3	6	6
6	(Serbia) Janko Tipsarević	6	3	2

Final
3/WC	(Switzerland) Stanislas Wawrinka	7	4	6
7	(Belgium) Xavier Malisse	5	6	1

=== Top half ===
First round
1	(Czech Republic) T Berdych	6	6
(Portugal) F Gil	0	1
(Brazil) M Daniel	2	2
(Croatia) I Dodig	6	6
(Germany) D Gremelmayr	6^{1}	4
(United States) R Kendrick	7^{7}	6
(Slovenia) B Kavčič	6	6
5	(France) J Chardy	3	2
3/WC	(Switzerland) S Wawrinka	6	6
WC	(India) R Bopanna	4	4
Q	(Belgium) D Goffin	6	6
(India) S Devvarman	2	4
(Germany) D Brown	4	6	2
Q	(Japan) Y Sugita	6	2	6
PR	(Canada) F Dancevic	7^{8}	4	4
8	(Netherlands) R Haase	6^{6}	6	6

Second round
1	(Czech Republic) T Berdych	6	6
(Croatia) I Dodig	2	4
(United States) R Kendrick	2	2
(Slovenia) B Kavčič	6	6
3/WC	(Switzerland) S Wawrinka	7^{7}	7^{7}
Q	(Belgium) D Goffin	6^{3}	6^{3}
Q	(Japan) Y Sugita	6	3	4
8	(Netherlands) R Haase	4	6	6

Quarterfinals
1	(Czech Republic) T Berdych	6	6
(Slovenia) B Kavčič	3	3
3/WC	(Switzerland) S Wawrinka	3	6	6
8	(Netherlands) R Haase	6	3	3

Semifinals
1	(Czech Republic) T Berdych	4	1
3/WC	(Switzerland) S Wawrinka	6	6

=== Bottom half ===
First round
7	(Belgium) X Malisse	6	6
(Turkey) M İlhan	3	1
(France) S Robert	6	6
(Austria) A Haider-Maurer	4	4
(Italy) S Bolelli	2	2
(Germany) B Phau	6	6
Q	(France) É Roger-Vasselin	1	3
4	(France) R Gasquet	6	6
6	(Serbia) J Tipsarević	6	6
(Argentina) E Schwank	3	4
WC	(India) Y Bhambri	2	1
Q	(Russia) A Kudryavtsev	6	6
(Colombia) A Falla	7	6
(Portugal) R Machado	5	3
(Japan) K Nishikori	4	7^{7}	6
2	(Croatia) M Čilić	6	6^{0}	2

Second round
7	(Belgium) X Malisse	6	6
(France) S Robert	2	2
(Germany) B Phau	1	7^{7}	7^{7}
4	(France) R Gasquet	6	6^{5}	6^{4}
6	(Serbia) J Tipsarević	6	7^{7}
Q	(Russia) A Kudryavtsev	2	6^{3}
(Colombia) A Falla	6	3	2
(Japan) K Nishikori	4	6	6

Quarterfinals
7	(Belgium) X Malisse	6	6
(Germany) B Phau	0	2
6	(Serbia) J Tipsarević	6	6
(Japan) K Nishikori	4	4

Semifinals
7	(Belgium) X Malisse	3	6	6
6	(Serbia) J Tipsarević	6	3	2
