= 2021 Erste Bank Open =

- Date: 25–31 October
- Edition: 47th
- Category: ATP Tour 500 Series
- Draw: 32S / 16D
- Prize money: €1,952,015
- Surface: Hard (indoor)
- Location: Vienna, Austria
- Venue: Wiener Stadthalle

Champions

Singles
- (Germany) Alexander Zverev

Doubles
- (Colombia) Juan Sebastián Cabal / (Colombia) Robert Farah
- Vienna Open

The 2021 Erste Bank Open was a men's tennis tournament played on indoor hard courts. It was the 47th edition of the event, and part of the ATP Tour 500 Series of the 2021 ATP Tour. It was held at the Wiener Stadthalle in Vienna, Austria, from 25 until 31 October 2021. Second-seeded Alexander Zverev won the singles title.

== Finals ==
=== Singles ===
- (Germany) Alexander Zverev def. (United States) Frances Tiafoe, 7–5, 6–4

=== Doubles ===
- (Colombia) Juan Sebastián Cabal / (Colombia) Robert Farah def. (United States) Rajeev Ram / (United Kingdom) Joe Salisbury, 6–4, 6–2

== Singles main-draw entrants ==
=== Seeds ===
Country	Player	Rank^{1}	Seed
GRE	Stefanos Tsitsipas	3	1
GER	Alexander Zverev	4	2
ITA	Matteo Berrettini	7	3
NOR	Casper Ruud	9	4
POL	Hubert Hurkacz	10	5
CAN	Félix Auger-Aliassime	12	6
ITA	Jannik Sinner	13	7
ARG	Diego Schwartzman	14	8

- Rankings are as of October 18, 2021

=== Other entrants ===
The following players received wildcards into the singles main draw:

- (United Kingdom) Andy Murray
- (Italy) Lorenzo Musetti
- (Austria) Dennis Novak

The following player received entry using a special exempt:

- (Lithuania) Ričardas Berankis

The following players received entry from the qualifying draw:

- (South Africa) Kevin Anderson
- (Italy) Gianluca Mager
- (Australia) Alexei Popyrin
- (United States) Frances Tiafoe

The following player received entry as a lucky loser:

- (Germany) Dominik Koepfer

=== Withdrawals ===
Before the tournament

- (Chile) Cristian Garín → replaced by (Germany) Dominik Koepfer
- (France) Ugo Humbert → replaced by (Hungary) Márton Fucsovics

== Doubles main-draw entrants ==
=== Seeds ===
Country	Player	Country	Player	Rank^{1}	Seed
CRO	Nikola Mektić	CRO	Mate Pavić	3	1
USA	Rajeev Ram	GBR	Joe Salisbury	7	2
AUS	John Peers	SVK	Filip Polášek	22	3
COL	Juan Sebastián Cabal	COL	Robert Farah	27	4

- Rankings are as of 18 October 2021

=== Other entrants ===
The following pairs received wildcards into the doubles main draw:

- (Spain) Feliciano López / (Greece) Stefanos Tsitsipas
- (Austria) Oliver Marach / (Austria) Philipp Oswald

The following pair received entry from the qualifying draw:

- (Austria) Alexander Erler / (Austria) Lucas Miedler

The following pair received entry as lucky losers:

- (Belgium) Sander Gillé / (Germany) Dominik Koepfer

=== Withdrawals ===
Before the tournament

- (Chile) Cristian Garín / (United Kingdom) Cameron Norrie → replaced by (Belgium) Sander Gillé / (Germany) Dominik Koepfer
- (Germany) Kevin Krawietz / (Romania) Horia Tecău → replaced by (South Africa) Lloyd Harris / (Romania) Horia Tecău
