= 2009 Chennai Open =

- Date: 5–10 January
- Edition: 14th
- Category: 250 series
- Draw: 32S / 16D
- Prize money: $398,250
- Surface: Hard / outdoors
- Location: Chennai, India
- Venue: SDAT Tennis Stadium

Champions

Singles
- (Croatia) Marin Čilić

Doubles
- (United States) Eric Butorac / (United States) Rajeev Ram
- Chennai Open

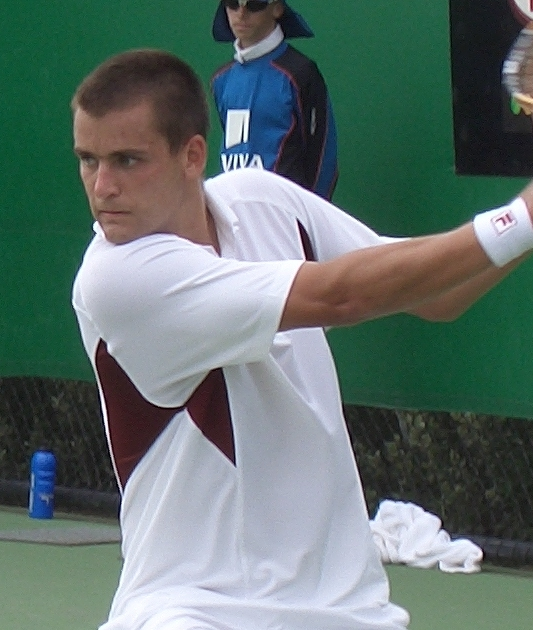
Singles 2008 Chennai Open champion Mikhail Youzhny chose to compete in Doha

The 2009 Chennai Open was a tennis tournament played on outdoor hard courts. It was the 14th edition of the Chennai Open, and part of the ATP World Tour 250 series of the 2009 ATP World Tour. It took place at the SDAT Tennis Stadium in Chennai, Tamil Nadu, India, from 5 through 10 January 2009.

The singles line up was led by Association of Tennis Professionals (ATP) No. 5, Tennis Masters Cup runner-up, Miami Masters, Pörtschach and Warsaw champion Nikolay Davydenko, Rome Masters finalist and Beijing Olympics doubles gold medalist Stanislas Wawrinka, and Costa do Sauípe and Bucharest runner-up, 2004 and 2005 Chennai champion Carlos Moyá.

== Finals ==
=== Singles ===
(Croatia) Marin Čilić defeated (India) Somdev Devvarman, 6–4, 7–6^{(7–3)}

- It was Čilić's first singles title of the year and 2nd of his career.

=== Doubles ===
(United States) Eric Butorac / (United States) Rajeev Ram defeated (Switzerland) Jean-Claude Scherrer / (Switzerland) Stanislas Wawrinka, 6–3, 6–4

== Review ==
=== Day one ===
Marin Čilić, Simon Greul and Björn Phau were the early winners in the singles event. The no. 3 seed Čilić overcame Alberto Martín from Spain 6–4, 6–4. The German player Greul had a comfortable 6–3, 6–4 victory over Daniel Gimeno Traver while compatriot Phau beat Santiago Ventura 6–2, 7–5. Greul will now play another German, the no. 5 seed Rainer Schüttler, who took three sets to emerge victorious against home-favourite Prakash Amritraj 6–2, 4–6, 6–1. In the other completed matches, seeded player Marcel Granollers (8) reached the second round without too much difficulty, beating Hyung Taik-Lee of South Korea 6–4, 7–5. The only non-Indian wildcard Lukáš Dlouhý recorded a 3–6, 6–2, 6–4 win against Go Soeda from Japan and Israel's top player Dudi Sela overcame Spaniard Rubén Ramírez Hidalgo 4–6, 7–6(3), 6–1.

The men's doubles also started on the first day. The only seeds in action, American Scott Lipsky and David Martin of Sweden progressed to the second round with a 7–6(9), 6–3 victory over home player Rohan Bopanna and Italian Flavio Cipolla. American duo Eric Butorac and Rajeev Ram advanced 6–1, 6–2 against home wildcards Yuki Bhambri and Harsh Mankad. Oliver Marach of Austria and Serbian Janko Tipsarević beat Spaniards Carlos Moyá and Pablo Andújar 3–6, 6–3, [10-4] (champions tiebreak) to set up a match with Lipsky and Martin in round two.

- Seeded players out (singles): None
- Seeded players out (doubles): None

=== Day two ===
In the remaining first round matches, world #5 and top seed, Russian Nikolay Davydenko, eased to a 6–2, 6–3 victory over Austrian Daniel Köllerer in his first match. He was joined by #4 seed Ivo Karlović of Croatia (defeated American Rajeev Ram 6–0, 6–3), #6 Carlos Moyá of Spain (triumphed against Danai Udomchoke 6–3, 7–6(4)), and #7 Janko Tipsarević of Serbia, comfortably advancing with a 6–2, 6–3 victory over Spaniard Pablo Andújar.#2 seed Stanislas Wawrinka of Switzerland wasn't as fortunate, falling to Italian qualifier Flavio Cipolla 6–4, 6–1. The winners were also joined by Uzbek Denis Istomin who will play Čilić following a 6–4, 7–6 triumph against home player Rohan Bopanna; German Andreas Beck who will play Marcel Granollers after thrashing Roko Karanušić 6–0, 6–1 and Czech Ivo Minář, who beat Wayne Odesnik of America 6–0, 6–3 and proceeded to face Karlović in round two.

On the doubles side, #3 seeds Rogier Wassen & Lovro Zovko won their first match, beating Alberto Martín & Dudi Sela 6–3, 6–1. They will next face Eric Butorac and Rajeev Ram in the quarter-finals. In an all-Spanish match between Daniel Gimeno Traver / Rubén Ramírez Hidalgo and Marcel Granollers / Santiago Ventura, the latter pair comfortably won 6–4, 6–2.

- Seeded players out (singles): [2] Stanislas Wawrinka
- Seeded players out (doubles): None

=== Day three ===
Because of rain, no matches were played. However, Lukáš Dlouhý advanced when top seed Nikolay Davydenko was forced to withdraw because of a heel inflammation, which will also keep him out of the Australian Open.

- Seeded players out (singles): [1] Nikolay Davydenko (withdrew)
- Seeded players out (doubles): None

=== Day four ===
- Seeded players out (singles): [6] Carlos Moyá
- Seeded players out (doubles): [3] Rogier Wassen /Lovro Zovko

=== Day five ===
- Seeded players out (singles): [4] Ivo Karlović, [7] Janko Tipsarević
- Seeded players out (doubles): [1] Mahesh Bhupathi /Mark Knowles

=== Day six ===
- Seeded players out (singles): [8] Marcel Granollers, [5] Rainer Schüttler (withdrew)
- Seeded players out (doubles): [4] Scott Lipsky /David Martin

=== Day seven ===
Marin Čilić won his 2nd career title by defeating Devvarman in straight sets.
