= 2011 Aircel Chennai Open =

- Date: 3–9 January
- Edition: 16th
- Category: 250 series
- Draw: 32S / 16D
- Prize money: $398,250
- Surface: Hard / outdoor
- Location: Chennai, India
- Venue: SDAT Tennis Stadium

Champions

Singles
- (Switzerland) Stan Wawrinka

Doubles
- (India) Mahesh Bhupathi / (India) Leander Paes
← 2010 ·	Aircel Chennai Open	· 2012 →

The 2011 Aircel Chennai Open was a men's tennis tournament played on outdoor hard courts. It was the 16th edition of the Chennai Open, and part of the 250 series of the 2011 ATP World Tour. It took place at the SDAT Tennis Stadium in Chennai, India, from 3 January through 9 January 2011. Third-seeded Stan Wawrinka won the singles title.

== Finals ==
=== Singles ===
(Switzerland) Stan Wawrinka defeated (Belgium) Xavier Malisse, 7–5, 4–6, 6–1

- It was Wawrinka's first title of the year and 3rd of his career.

=== Doubles ===
(India) Mahesh Bhupathi / (India) Leander Paes defeated (Netherlands) Robin Haase / (United States) David Martin, 6–2, 6–7^{(3–7)}, [10–7]

== ATP entrants ==
=== Seeds ===
Country	Player	Rank^{1}	Seed
CZE	Tomáš Berdych	6	1
CRO	Marin Čilić	14	2
SUI	Stan Wawrinka	21	3
FRA	Richard Gasquet	30	4
FRA	Jérémy Chardy	45	5
SRB	Janko Tipsarević	49	6
BEL	Xavier Malisse	60	7
NED	Robin Haase	65	8

- Rankings are as of 27 December 2010.

=== Other entrants ===
The following players received wildcards into the singles main draw:

- (India) Yuki Bhambri
- (India) Rohan Bopanna
- (Switzerland) Stan Wawrinka

The following players received entry from the qualifying draw:

- (Belgium) David Goffin
- (Russia) Alexander Kudryavtsev
- (Japan) Yūichi Sugita
- (France) Édouard Roger-Vasselin
