= 2021 Erste Bank Open – Doubles =

Doubles
- 2021 Erste Bank Open

Final
- Champions: (Colombia) Juan Sebastián Cabal (Colombia) Robert Farah
- Runners-up: (United States) Rajeev Ram (United Kingdom) Joe Salisbury
- Score: 6–4, 6–2

Details
- Draw: 16
- Seeds: 4

Events
Singles	Doubles
← 2020 ·	Vienna Open	· 2022 →

Łukasz Kubot and Marcelo Melo were the defending champions, but Kubot chose not to participate. Melo played alongside Ivan Dodig, but lost in the first round to Feliciano López and Stefanos Tsitsipas.

Juan Sebastián Cabal and Robert Farah won the title, defeating Rajeev Ram and Joe Salisbury in the final, 6–4, 6–2.

== Seeds ==
1. (Croatia) Nikola Mektić / (Croatia) Mate Pavić (quarterfinals)
2. (United States) Rajeev Ram / (United Kingdom) Joe Salisbury (final)
3. (Australia) John Peers / (Slovakia) Filip Polášek (semifinals)
4. (Colombia) Juan Sebastián Cabal / (Colombia) Robert Farah (champions)

== Draw ==
=== Key ===
- Q = Qualifier
- WC = Wild card
- LL = Lucky loser
- Alt = Alternate
- SE = Special exempt
- PR = Protected ranking
- ITF = ITF entry
- JE = Junior exempt
- w/o = Walkover
- r = Retired
- d = Defaulted
- SR = Special ranking

=== Draw ===
First round
1	(Croatia) N Mektić (Croatia) M Pavić	6	6
(Germany) T Pütz (New Zealand) M Venus	4	4
(France) N Mahut (France) F Martin	6^{4}	3
LL	(Belgium) S Gillé (Germany) D Koepfer	7^{7}	6
4	(Colombia) JS Cabal (Colombia) R Farah	4	6	[10]
PR	(Netherlands) W Koolhof (Netherlands) J-J Rojer	6	3	[8]
(Croatia) I Dodig (Brazil) M Melo	3	6	[8]
WC	(Spain) F López (Greece) S Tsitsipas	6	3	[10]
Q	(Austria) A Erler (Austria) L Miedler	3	5
WC	(Austria) O Marach (Austria) P Oswald	6	7
(Austria) J Melzer (Germany) A Zverev	6^{3}	5
3	(Australia) J Peers (Slovakia) F Polášek	7^{7}	7
(Canada) F Auger-Aliassime (Germany) A Mies	6	6
(United Kingdom) D Evans (United Kingdom) N Skupski	4	3
(South Africa) L Harris (Romania) H Tecău	3	0
2	(United States) R Ram (United Kingdom) J Salisbury	6	6

Quarterfinals
1	(Croatia) N Mektić (Croatia) M Pavić	6	6^{2}	[9]
LL	(Belgium) S Gillé (Germany) D Koepfer	3	7^{7}	[11]
4	(Colombia) JS Cabal (Colombia) R Farah	7^{7}	6^{7}	[10]
WC	(Spain) F López (Greece) S Tsitsipas	6^{5}	7^{9}	[8]
WC	(Austria) O Marach (Austria) P Oswald	7^{7}	3	[4]
3	(Australia) J Peers (Slovakia) F Polášek	6^{4}	6	[10]
(Canada) F Auger-Aliassime (Germany) A Mies	3	7^{9}	[6]
2	(United States) R Ram (United Kingdom) J Salisbury	6	6^{7}	[10]

Semifinals
LL	(Belgium) S Gillé (Germany) D Koepfer	6	3	[8]
4	(Colombia) JS Cabal (Colombia) R Farah	3	6	[10]
3	(Australia) J Peers (Slovakia) F Polášek	6	6^{2}	[7]
2	(United States) R Ram (United Kingdom) J Salisbury	3	7^{7}	[10]

Final
4	(Colombia) JS Cabal (Colombia) R Farah	6	6
2	(United States) R Ram (United Kingdom) J Salisbury	4	2

== Qualifying ==
=== Seeds ===
1. (Italy) Simone Bolelli / (Argentina) Máximo González (first round)
2. (Belgium) Sander Gillé / (Germany) Dominik Koepfer (qualifying competition, lucky losers)

=== Qualifiers ===
1. (Austria) Alexander Erler / (Austria) Lucas Miedler

=== Lucky losers ===
1. (Belgium) Sander Gillé / (Germany) Dominik Koepfer

=== Qualifying draw ===
First round
1	(Italy) Simone Bolelli (Argentina) Máximo González	3	2
WC	(Austria) Alexander Erler (Austria) Lucas Miedler	6	6
(Sweden) André Göransson (Netherlands) David Pel	3	3
2	(Belgium) Sander Gillé (Germany) Dominik Koepfer	6	6

Qualifying competition
WC	(Austria) Alexander Erler (Austria) Lucas Miedler	7	6
2	(Belgium) Sander Gillé (Germany) Dominik Koepfer	5	4
