= Marin Čilić =

Croatian tennis player (born 1988)

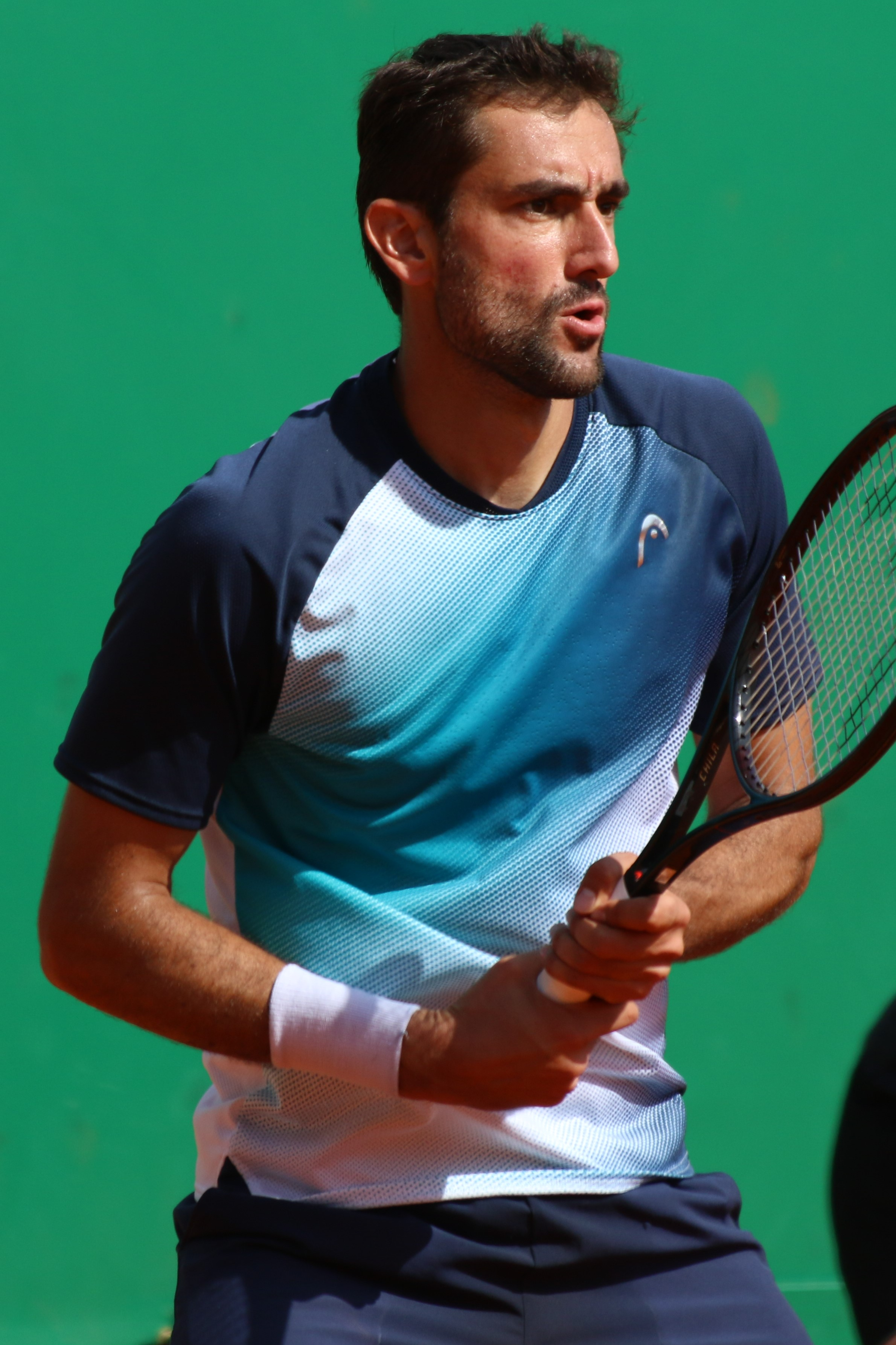
- Čilić at the 2022 Monte-Carlo Masters
- Country (sports): Croatia
- Residence: Monte Carlo, Monaco
- Born: 28 September 1988 (age 38) Medjugorje, SR Bosnia and Herzegovina, SFR Yugoslavia
- Height: 1.98 m (6 ft 6 in)
- Turned pro: 2005
- Plays: Right-handed (two-handed backhand)
- Coach: Bob Brett (2004–2013); Goran Ivanišević (2013–2016); Jonas Björkman (2016–2017); Vedran Martić (2020–2021); Ivan Cinkuš (2017–2020, 2021–2023); Vilim Višak (2020–)
- Prize money: US $34,507,613: 13th all-time leader in earnings
- Official website: marincilic.com

Singles
- Career record: 610–367
- Career titles: 21
- Highest ranking: No. 3 (29 January 2018)
- Current ranking: No. 97 (9 November 2026)

Grand Slam singles results
- Australian Open: F (2018)
- French Open: SF (2022)
- Wimbledon: F (2017)
- US Open: W (2014)

Other tournaments
- Tour Finals: RR (2014, 2016, 2017, 2018)
- Olympic Games: 3R (2016)

Doubles
- Career record: 89–100
- Career titles: 0
- Highest ranking: No. 49 (15 April 2013)

Other doubles tournaments
- Olympic Games: F (2021)

Team competitions
- Davis Cup: W (2018)
Medal record
Representing Croatia
Olympic Games
Silver medal – second place	2020 Tokyo	Men's Doubles
- Last updated on: 19 October 2026.

Marin Čilić (Croatian pronunciation: [mâriːn tʃǐːlitɕ]; born 28 September 1988) is a Croatian professional tennis player. He has been ranked as high as world No. 3 in men's singles by the Association of Tennis Professionals (ATP), achieved in January 2018. Čilić has won 21 ATP Tour-level singles titles, including a major at the 2014 US Open. He was also runner-up at the 2017 Wimbledon Championships and the 2018 Australian Open, and won an ATP Masters 1000 event at the 2016 Cincinnati Open.

Playing for his country, Čilić was pivotal in the Croatian team's victory at the 2018 Davis Cup, and won an Olympic silver medal in men's doubles at the 2020 Tokyo Olympics partnering Ivan Dodig. Alongside Goran Ivanišević and Iva Majoli, he is widely considered to be one of the greatest Croatian tennis players in history.

Čilić has reached the semifinal stage or better at all four majors, and the quarterfinal stage or better at all nine Masters tournaments. He is one of only six active players with 20 or more titles.

== Early life ==
Marin Čilić was born in Medjugorje, SR Bosnia and Herzegovina, a town in Herzegovina, to Bosnian Croat parents. He was raised as a Catholic. His father Zdenko Čilić was determined that his sons – Marin and older brothers Vinko and Goran – would have the opportunities he lacked in playing sports. When the first tennis courts in the town were built in 1991, Marin and his friends were among the first to play on them. At the recommendation of Goran Ivanišević, in 2004, at the age of 15, Čilić moved to Sanremo, Italy, to work with Ivanišević's former coach, Bob Brett.

== Personal life ==
On 28 April 2018, Čilić married his long-time girlfriend, Kristina Milković in Cavtat. They have two children together, sons Baldo and Vito.

=== Humanitarian work ===
Through Zaklada Marin Čilić ("Marin Čilić Fund"), he organized a humanitarian tournament Gem set Hrvatska ("Gem set Croatia") in Zagreb, Petrinja, Zadar and Karlovac, supported by colleagues (Borna Gojo, Ivan Dodig, Franko Škugor, Antonia Ružić, Iva Primorac) and various Croatian sportsmen, most notable being Dejan Lovren (footballer), Jerko Leko (footballer), Doris Bačić (footballer), Ivano Balić (handballer), Igor Karačić (handballer), Luka Stepančić (handballer), Martin Sinković (rower), Valent Sinković (rower), Dina Levačić (swimmer), Matea Jelić (taekwondo), Zrinka Ljutić (skier), Karlo Matković (basketballer), Andrija Stipanović (basketballer), Iva Todorić (basketballer) etc.

== Career ==
=== 2004–05: Junior circuit ===
Čilić began playing on the junior ITF circuit in spring 2004. At the start he played on clay courts, winning the La Vie Junior Cup Villach in singles and the Dutch Junior Open in doubles. He then qualified for the 2004 US Open, where he lost in the second round to Sam Querrey. In 2005, he won the French Open title in Boys' singles, beating Andy Murray in the semifinal and Antal van der Duim in the final. He finished 2005 ranked number two behind American Donald Young. While on the junior circuit, he won six tournaments in singles and four in doubles with his Canadian partner, Greg Kates.

Before representing Croatia, he played for Bosnia and Herzegovina as a junior with partner Zachary Rosen.

=== 2005–2007: ATP Tour ===
In 2004, Čilić played one Futures event (Croatia F1), at which he reached the second round; he finished the year tied at No. 1463 on the rankings of the ATP Tour. He played seven Futures tournaments in 2005, winning one, the Croatia F3 event; two Challenger tournaments, in Zagreb and Geneva; and one ATP International Series tournament, the Croatia Open, where he lost in the opening round. He finished the year ranked No. 587.

In 2006, he played three Futures, winning the Croatia F1 and Croatia F2 events. He also played in nine Challengers, nine International Series events (reaching the semifinals at Gstaad), and two Davis Cup ties, against Austria and Argentina. By the end of the year, he was ranked No. 170.

In 2007, he won the first and second professional tournaments of his career: the Casablanca Challenger (in April) and the Rijeka Challenger (in May). In June, at the Queen's Club Championships, he beat Tim Henman in the first round after trailing 2–4 in the final set, and reached the quarterfinals, where he fell to Andy Roddick. After that performance, he reached a new career-high ranking of No. 101 on 18 June 2007.

In the World Group playoffs in the first round of the 2007 Davis Cup, Čilić beat Benjamin Becker of Germany; however, Croatia went on to lose the tie, three matches to two.

=== 2008: First ATP singles title ===
In 2008, Čilić reached the semifinals at the Chennai Open, in both singles and doubles. In the singles, he was defeated by Mikhail Youzhny, who went on to win the tournament. Čilić made it to the fourth round of the 2008 Australian Open, taking out two seeds on his way, including 2007 Australian Open finalist Fernando González. James Blake beat him in the fourth round. He had achieved his goal for the year of reaching the top 40. His fourth-round result at the Australian Open put him at no. 39 in the ATP rankings.

Čilić also made it to the fourth round of Wimbledon, beating Jarkko Nieminen in five sets in the second round and knocking-out 14th seed Paul-Henri Mathieu. At the 2008 Olympics, he reached the second round of the men's singles, beating Juan Mónaco before losing to Fernando González. He lost in straight sets to Arnaud Clément. At the Canada Masters, he defeated Andy Roddick in reaching the quarterfinal stage, giving his best performance in a Masters Series tournament to date. He lost in three sets to Gilles Simon in the quarterfinals.

Čilić played the Pilot Pen Tennis tournament in New Haven, Connecticut, where he won his first ATP title. He defeated Viktor Troicki, Jürgen Melzer, and Igor Andreev in early rounds, then 2007 finalist Mardy Fish in the final. Čilić, seeded for the first time at a Grand Slam tournament, reached the third round of the US Open, but lost to Novak Djokovic in a match that lasted almost four hours. Čilić came back from a break down in each of the second, third, and fourth sets. In the first round, he had defeated Julien Benneteau in five sets in a match that lasted more than four hours, winning the deciding set.

=== 2009: US Open quarterfinals ===
Čilić won his first title of 2009 and second career ATP title at the Chennai Open, defeating first-time finalist Somdev Devvarman.

He reached the fourth round of the Australian Open after beating David Ferrer in straight sets, equalling his 2008 record. In the fourth round, he was defeated by Juan Martín del Potro in four sets. Later in the year, Čilić won the PBZ Zagreb Indoors, defeating compatriot Mario Ančić in the final. He helped his country defeat Chilean opponents in the Davis Cup first-round tie by winning the opening singles match and joining forces with Mario Ančić to win the doubles rubber.

Čilić reached a career best at the French Open when he beat 18th seed Radek Štěpánek in the third round in straight sets. After two competitive sets against the third-seeded Andy Murray, Čilić lost the match.

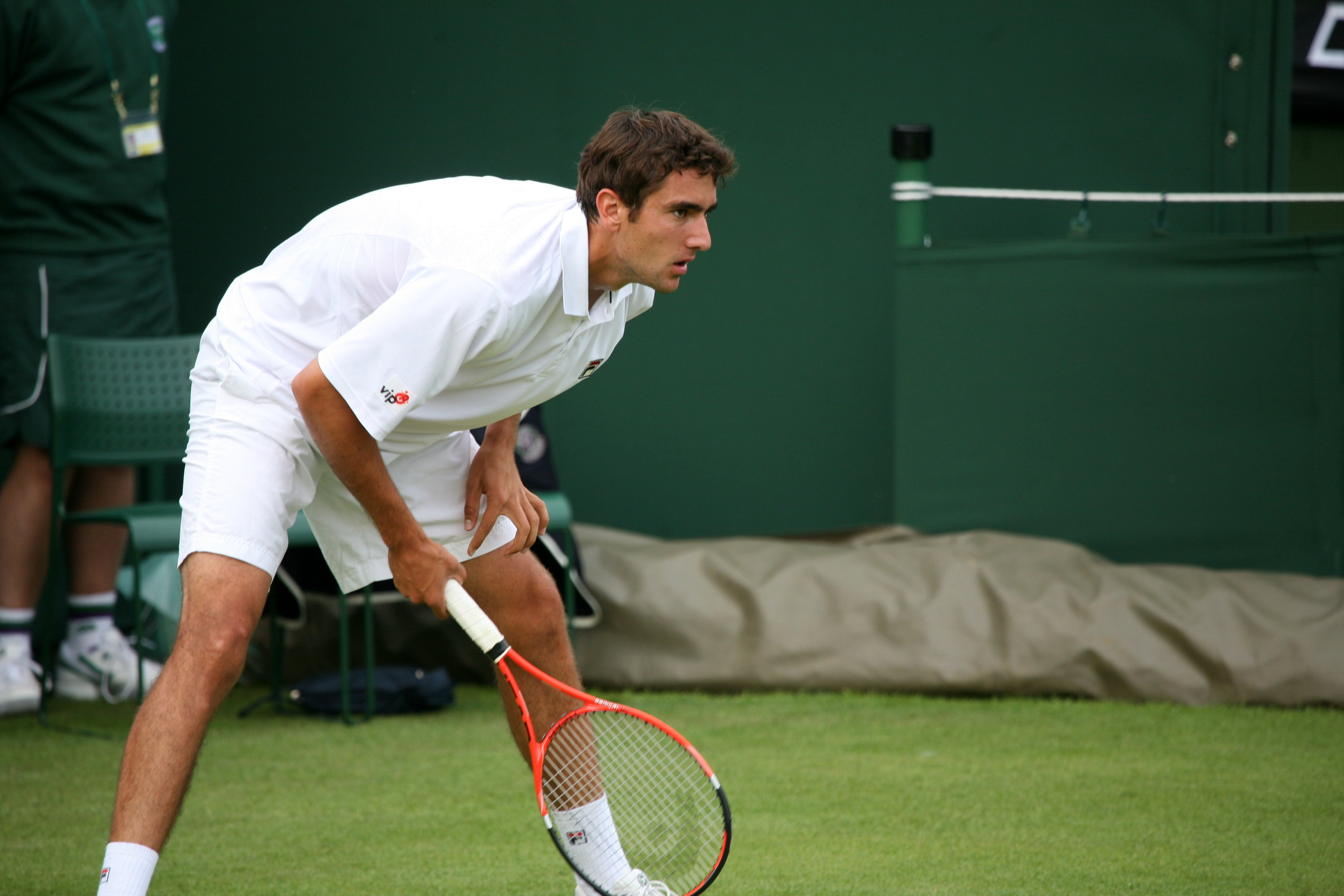
Čilić at the 2009 Wimbledon Championships

He reached the second round of the Queen's Club Championships, an ATP World Tour 250 series event, where he was defeated by Nicolas Mahut of France. He beat Alberto Martín to make it into the second round at Wimbledon and won a five-set match (spread over two days) against Sam Querrey. He played another five-set match in the third round against Tommy Haas. He recovered from two sets down, but lost 10–8 in the deciding set, having held a match point.

During the hard-court season, Čilić was defeated in back-to-back events in the first round. At Washington, he was defeated in straight sets by Somdev Devvarman. He then failed to duplicate his quarterfinal appearance in Canada, losing to Mikhail Youzhny. In the US Open, as the 16th seed, he reached the fourth round, after defeating Ryan Sweeting, Jesse Levine, and Denis Istomin. He defeated Levine after being down two sets to love, coming back to win. He then scored the biggest upset of the 2009 US Open with a straight-sets victory over second-seeded Andy Murray in the fourth round. Čilić outclassed Murray by saving all the break points he faced and took advantage of Murray's unforced errors. After the match, he said it was the biggest win of his career to date. However, in the quarterfinals, he lost to the eventual champion Juan Martín del Potro, despite leading by one set and an opening break in the second set.

Following his impressive US Open run, Čilić participated in the China Open in Beijing as the eighth seed. He won his opening match against Russian Igor Andreev, followed by a three-set victory over Frenchman Julien Benneteau. In the quarterfinals, he defeated fourth seed Nikolay Davydenko, before stunning world No. 2 and top seed (in the tournament) Rafael Nadal in a straightforward win. In the final, Čilić went down to second seed Novak Djoković in straight sets.

He reached the fifth final of his career at the Bank Austria Tennis Trophy as top seed; however, he lost. He received a wild card for the Davidoff Swiss Indoors, where he finished in the quarterfinals, losing to Radek Štěpánek. His final tournament of the year was the BNP Paribas Masters. Entered as 12th seed, he came from a set down to defeat Łukasz Kubot in the second round, and then from a set down again to defeat seventh seed Fernando Verdasco, before coming to a halt in the quarterfinals against eventual finalist Gaël Monfils.

=== 2010: First major semifinal and top 10 debut ===
Čilić won the Chennai Open final, beating Stan Wawrinka of Switzerland in straight sets.

Seeded 14th at the Australian Open, he defeated Fabrice Santoro, Bernard Tomic, and Stan Wawrinka in the first three rounds. In the fourth round, he faced fourth seed and reigning US Open champion del Potro; it was their third meeting in the past five majors. In a match that lasted more than four and a half hours, Čilić defeated Del Potro to reach his second major quarterfinal appearance. In the quarterfinals, he defeated seventh seed Andy Roddick in another five-set victory. In doing so, he became the first Croatian to reach the semifinals at the Australian Open. However, Čilić eventually lost in four sets to Andy Murray, despite winning the first set. Čilić followed up his Australian campaign by defending his title in Zagreb, defeating Michael Berrer in the final. Čilić achieved a new career-high ranking of No. 9 as a result. Čilić was selected to play singles and doubles partnering with Karlović for the Croatia Davis Cup team against Ecuador in March 2010. Čilić, seeded eighth, lost in the second round to Guillermo García-López at the BNP Paribas Open.

At the French Open, Čilić lost to Robin Söderling in the fourth round. Čilić was defeated in the first round of Wimbledon by Florian Mayer.

He reached the semifinals of the Legg Mason Tennis Classic in Washington D.C., ending Mardy Fish's 11-match winning-streak in the third round. Čilić was defeated by eventual champion David Nalbandian.

At the US Open, Čilić lost to Kei Nishikori in the second round.

=== 2011: Sixth ATP title ===
Čilić began the season with a first-round loss to Kei Nishikori in Chennai, failing to defend his title. At the Australian Open he progressed to the fourth round, defeating Donald Young, Santiago Giraldo, and then John Isner in a five-set. In the fourth round, he lost to world No. 1, Rafael Nadal. Next, he went to Zagreb to defend another title. Again, he was unable to do so, falling to Florian Mayer in the quarterfinals.

Čilić played next in Rotterdam and lost to Viktor Troicki in the quarterfinals. He then played in Marseille, where he was unseeded. He defeated Tomáš Berdych in the quarterfinals and saved one match point in a comeback win against Mikhail Youzhny. He lost to Robin Söderling in the final. Čilić played for Croatia in the World Group playoffs in the first round of the 2011 Davis Cup, defeating Florian Mayer in the opening singles rubber. He levelled the tie at 2–2 by defeating Philipp Kohlschreiber in the first reverse singles rubber. However, Germany ultimately won the tie.

Čilić lost in the first round of the French Open to Rubén Ramírez Hidalgo and at Wimbledon to his compatriot Ivan Ljubičić.

At Umag, Čilić became the first Croatian man to reach the finals in over 20 years, losing to Alexandr Dolgopolov. He upset Juan Martín del Potro in the second round of the Rogers Cup and reached the third round of the US Open, losing to Roger Federer. In ATP 500 in Beijing, he lost the final against world No. 6, Tomáš Berdych, in three sets. The next week he was upset by Albert Ramos in the Shanghai Rolex Masters. He won his sixth career title in Saint Petersburg by defeating world No. 10 Janko Tipsarević in the final. En route to the final, he defeated Sergei Bubka, Somdev Devvarman, Andreas Seppi, and Mikhail Youzhny.

=== 2012: Two ATP titles ===
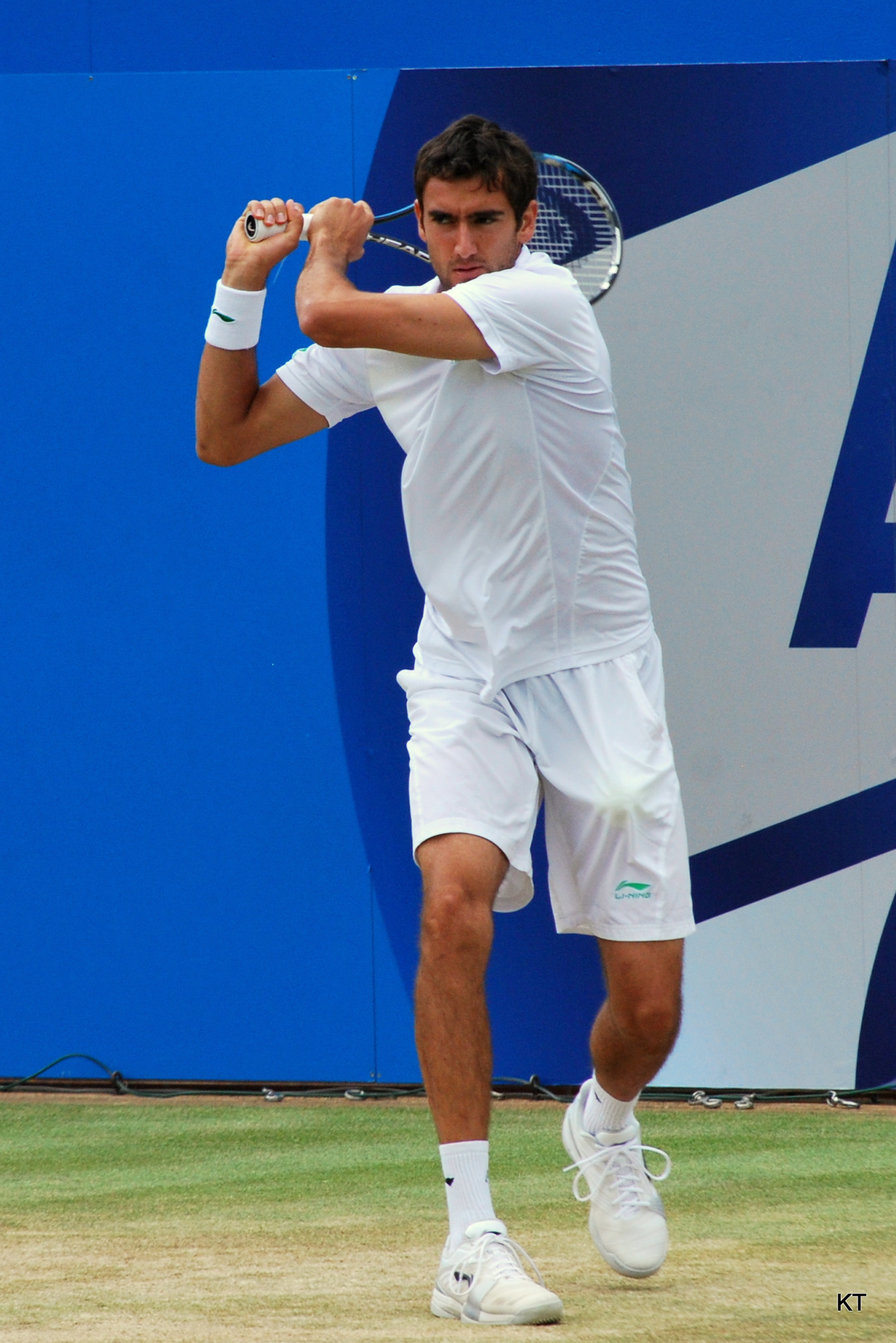
Čilić during the final of the 2012 Queen's Club Championships

Čilić did not play at the 2012 Australian Open, but did play at Indian Wells, where he lost in the second round to David Nalbandian. He was defeated by Juan Martín del Potro in the third round of Miami and the French Open. In June, Čilić won the Queen's Club Championships in London after his opponent in the final, David Nalbandian, was disqualified in the second set for aggravated behaviour, having kicked the hoarding around a linesman's chair, injuring the linesman.

In the third round of Wimbledon, he beat Sam Querrey 7–6, 6–4, 6–7, 6–7, 17–15 in the second-longest match ever played at Wimbledon in 5 hours and 31 minutes. He subsequently lost to Andy Murray in the following round. In July 2012, Čilić became the first home player to win the Croatia Open after 22 years by defeating Marcel Granollers of Spain in the final.

At the Summer Olympics, he reached the second round in the men's singles, beating Jürgen Melzer before losing to Lleyton Hewitt. In the men's doubles, he reached the quarterfinals with Ivan Dodig.

Čilić was seeded 12th at the US Open, where he matched his 2009 effort in reaching the quarterfinals. He was defeated by the eventual champion Andy Murray despite winning the first set and leading 5–1 in the second set.

=== 2013: Failed drugs test and ban ===
Čilić started his year at the Chennai Open, where he lost to Benoît Paire in the quarterfinals. At the Australian Open, he was seeded 12th but was upset in the third round by Andreas Seppi in a five-set match. In February, Čilić played for Croatia in the Davis Cup World Group playoffs against Italy; he defeated Paolo Lorenzi in the opening singles rubber, and in the first reverse singles, he avenged his earlier loss to Seppi at the Australian Open, prevailing in a straight-sets win. Italy, however, won the tie eventually with a final score of 3–2.

At Zagreb, where he had won twice in 2009 and 2010, Čilić won for a third time to earn his ninth career title, defeating Jürgen Melzer in the final. Čilić was top-seeded in the Memphis Indoor event but lost to Kei Nishikori, the eventual champion, in the quarterfinals. Čilić next played at Indian Wells, where he lost in the third round to Milos Raonic in three sets. In the following tournament at Miami, he defeated world No. 8, Jo-Wilfried Tsonga, in the fourth round but lost to Andy Murray in the quarterfinals.

Čilić started his clay-court season in Monte Carlo, but lost to Richard Gasquet in the fourth round. In May, it was announced Čilić had left his longtime coach Bob Brett and would be coachless at tournaments before hiring a new one. At the French Open, he lost in the third round to Viktor Troicki in straight sets. In June, Čilić returned to Queen's Club to defend his title. He defeated world No. 6, Tomas Berdych, in the quarterfinals, his second top 10 win of the year, and Lleyton Hewitt in the semifinal. In the final, Čilić lost to Andy Murray in three sets.

At Wimbledon Čilić pulled out before his second-round match claiming he had a left knee injury where he was scheduled to play Kenny de Schepper of France. However, a month later it was revealed that Čilić had pulled out due to failing a drugs test in Munich for, according to Jutarnji list daily, "incautious use of glucose." On 16 September 2013, he received a backdated nine-month ban due to testing positive for the banned substance nikethamide. Čilić claimed that the banned substance was ingested via Coramine glucose tablets bought at a pharmacy by a member of his team, and as a result, the independent tribunal believed that he did not intend to enhance his performance. The suspension ran until 1 February 2014 and all prize money and points since the positive test including the Munich tournament were null and forfeited. Čilić appealed against this ban to the Court of Arbitration for Sport, who reduced the ban from nine months to four months on 25 October. They stated that "the degree of fault committed by the athlete was inferior to that established in the (tribunal) decision and the sanction imposed was too severe in view of the degree of fault". Čilić, whose ranking had dropped to number 47, received an immediate boost as results at the French Open, Queen's and Wimbledon were reinstated.

In late 2013, Čilić started working with Goran Ivanišević as his new coach.

=== 2014: US Open champion ===
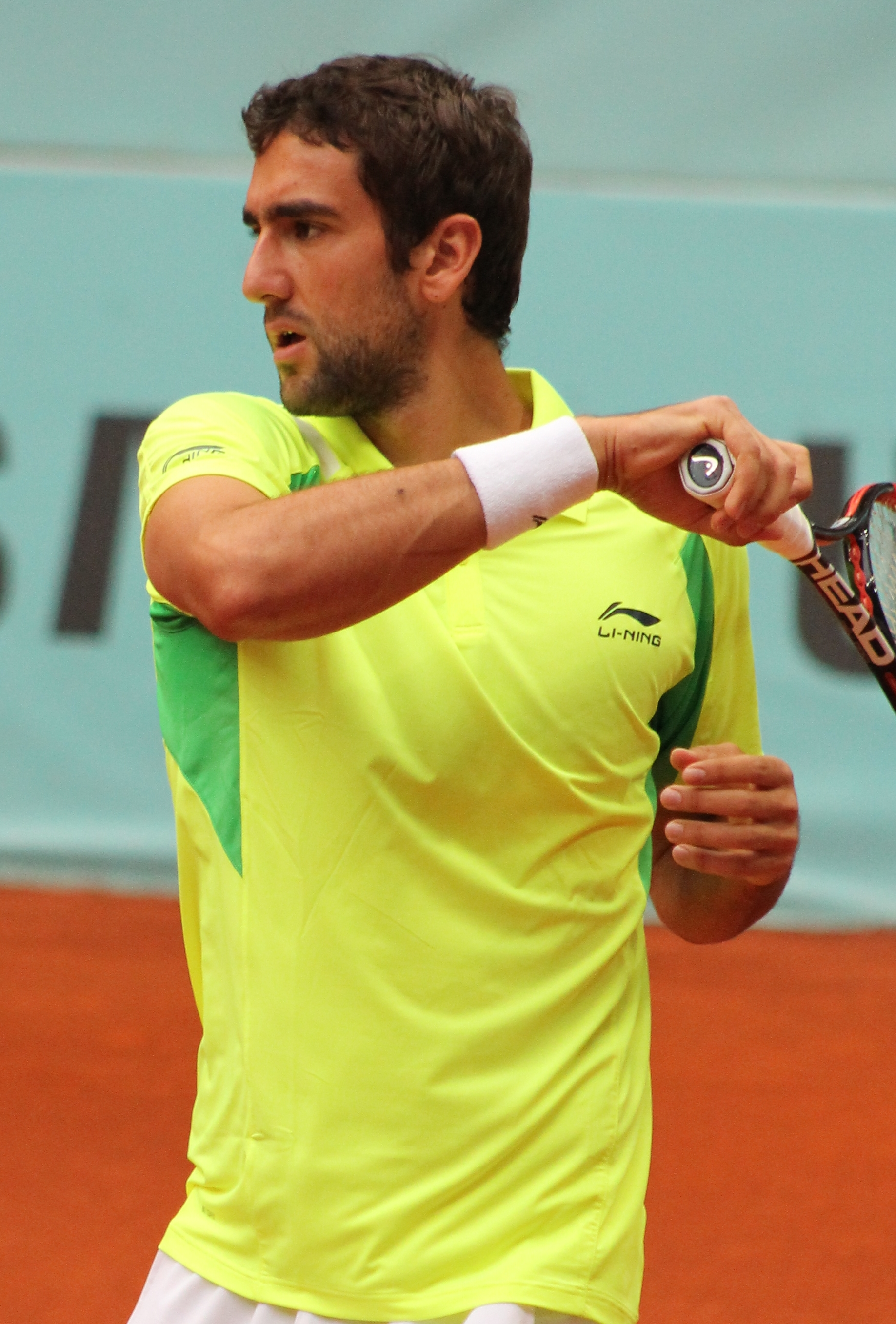
Čilić at the 2014 Madrid Open

Čilić returned to the tour at Brisbane. He defeated Denis Istomin and Grigor Dimitrov to reach the quarterfinal, where he lost to Kei Nishikori. In Sydney, he lost to Denis Istomin in the second round. At the Australian Open second round, Čilić lost to Gilles Simon in five sets.

In February, Čilić successfully defended his title at Zagreb without dropping a set, winning his 10th career title. Čilić extended his winning streak at the Rotterdam Open. He defeated Lukas Rosol, world No. 10, Jo-Wilfried Tsonga, world No. 6, Andy Murray and Igor Sijsling, reaching the second final of the season, where he lost to Tomas Berdych. Čilić continued his excellent form in Delray Beach, reaching his third consecutive final of the season, where he defeated Kevin Anderson and won his 11th singles title.

Čilić reached the fourth round of the Indian Wells Masters. He defeated Paolo Lorenzi and Tommy Robredo to set up a clash with Novak Djokovic. However, he lost the match in three sets. His good form came to an end in the Miami Masters where he lost to Édouard Roger-Vasselin in the second round.

During the clay season, Čilić reached the quarterfinals in Barcelona. He lost in early rounds in both Madrid Open and Rome Masters. At the French Open, Čilić reached the third round before losing to Djokovic in four sets.

Čilić returned to Queen's Club in June, where he was last year's runner-up on the grass court, however, he was knocked out by Marinko Matosevic in the first round. Čilić successfully rebounded at Wimbledon, reached the quarterfinals for the first time, beating Paul-Henri Mathieu, Andreas Haider-Maurer, Tomas Berdych and Jérémy Chardy before losing to eventual champion Novak Djokovic in five sets.

In July, Čilić played Croatia Open on home soil, where he was defeated in the semifinals by Tommy Robredo. In the warmup US Open Series, Čilić advanced to the third round at Rogers Cup, where he lost to Roger Federer in a close three-set match. In the following Cincinnati Masters, Čilić also reached the third round before losing to Stan Wawrinka.

Seeded 14th at the US Open, Čilić defeated Marcos Baghdatis, Illya Marchenko and Kevin Anderson to set up a fourth-round fixture against Gilles Simon, beating the Frenchman for the first time in five matches. He then went on to defeat both world No. 7, Tomas Berdych, and world No. 3, Roger Federer, in straight sets to reach his maiden major final. This was also his first-ever victory against Federer in all competitions. Čilić defeated 10th seed Kei Nishikori in straight sets in the final, claiming his first major title and becoming the first Croatian to win a men's major title since his coach Goran Ivanišević won the 2001 Wimbledon Championships. His triumph in the final was also his 300th professional victory.

Following his US Open victory, Čilić played for Croatia in Davis Cup World Group playoffs against Netherlands. Initially signed up for doubles rubber only, Čilić and teammate Marin Draganja beat Robin Haase and Jean-Julien Rojer. After a 2:2 tie between two countries, however, Čilić stepped up and played the deciding fifth singles rubber in place of young compatriot Borna Ćorić, where he defeated Thiemo de Bakker. The victory earned Croatia the World Group status for 2015.

At China Open, Čilić advanced to the quarterfinal before losing to Andy Murray. In Shanghai Masters, Čilić was upset in the first round by fellow countryman Ivo Karlović after losing the tiebreak in the third set. Čilić, however, rebounded at Kremlin Cup, where he defeated Roberto Bautista Agut in the final and won his fourth title of the season. On 18 October, it was announced Čilić, as the then reigning US Open champion, had become the fifth player (after Djokovic, Nadal, Federer and Wawrinka) to qualify for the ATP World Tour Finals in London from 9–16 November. Čilić subsequently withdrew from the Valencia Open and Paris Masters in order to allow time for an arm injury to heal before the tour finals. He ultimately lost all three matches in the round robin.

Čilić finished the season as world No. 9 in year-end ATP rankings.

=== 2015: Fourteenth ATP title ===
A shoulder injury prevented Čilić from playing the Brisbane International and Australian Open.

After being sidelined for more than two months, Čilić made his season debut at the Indian Wells Masters. After receiving a bye in the first round, he lost in the second round to Juan Mónaco in straight sets. Čilić subsequently withdrew from the Miami Open due to the shoulder problem. Čilić returned to tour at Monte-Carlo Masters, where he advanced to quarterfinals, before losing to eventual champion Novak Djokovic.

At the 2015 French Open, Čilić lost to David Ferrer in the fourth round in straight sets. At Queen's Club, Čilić was beaten in the second round by Victor Troicki in three sets. Čilić matched his 2014 Wimbledon performance, reaching the quarterfinals again after eliminating Moriya, Berankis, Isner (12–10 in the fifth set), and Kudla.

Čilić returned to Flushing Meadows for the US Open to defend his title, reaching the semi-finals where he was beaten in straight sets by Novak Djokovic who also went on to win in the final. Čilić managed to defend his title at the Kremlin Cup, winning the final in almost identical fashion to the previous year. In the final, he defeated the same player as the previous year, Roberto Bautista Agut.

=== 2016: First Masters title and Davis Cup final ===
In the first major tournament of the year, Marin Čilić was seeded 12th, but he was upset by Bautista Agut in the third round of the Australian Open.

At Indian Wells, he reached the quarterfinals before losing to No. 15 seed David Goffin. At the Miami Masters, he was defeated by Gilles Simon in third round.

At the Wimbledon Championships, Čilić repeated his efforts of the previous two years making the quarterfinals, after eliminating rival Kei Nishikori in the fourth round. In the quarterfinals, he met third seed Roger Federer; Čilić won the first two sets and had match points in the fourth set but was unable to convert eventually being eliminated in five sets.

At the 2016 Olympics, he competed in the men's singles and the men's doubles with Marin Draganja. He reached the last 16 in the singles and the second round in the doubles.

In August 2016, Čilić announced his new coach as Jonas Björkman in a video posted to MyATP. In Cincinnati, Čilić claimed his maiden Masters title, defeating Andy Murray in the final in straight sets. This win ended Murray's 22-match winning streak, dating back to 2016 Queen's Club. The Croat beat Viktor Troicki, Fernando Verdasco, Tomáš Berdych, Borna Ćorić and Grigor Dimitrov in the route to the final. Čilić returned to the top 10 in the following week.

In October, he captured his maiden ATP 500 level title at the Swiss Indoors, beating Nishikori in straight sets in the final. At the Paris Masters, Čilić defeated Djokovic for the first time in his career to reach the semifinals, where he subsequently lost to John Isner. His run guaranteed that he would qualify for the ATP World Tour Finals for the second time in three years. There, in the round robin, he lost to Murray and Wawrinka, but defeated Nishikori for his first-ever win at the Finals. With this victory, he rose to No. 6 in the ATP rankings.

In the final of the Davis Cup, with Croatia leading Argentina by 2–1 in matches, Čilić led Juan Martín del Potro by two sets to love needing one more set to win the title for his country. However, del Potro went on to win the match in five sets and Argentina won the deciding match to win the tournament.

=== 2017: Wimbledon final ===
Čilić started his 2017 season as first seed at the Chennai Open but lost to Jozef Kovalík in the second round. In the first major of the year, the Australian Open, Čilić lost in the second round to Dan Evans.

In February, he lost in his opening match in Montpellier, reached the quarterfinals of the Rotterdam, and the semifinals of Acapulco.

Čilić was eliminated in the second rounds of Indian Wells, Miami Open, and Madrid Open, but reached the quarterfinals in Rome, and Monte Carlo. In May, Čilić won the title at the Istanbul Open, defeating Milos Raonic in the final, in straight sets. This was his 14th ATP 250 title, second clay title, and 17th title overall. Additionally, Čilić's victory in Istanbul meant that 2017 was his tenth consecutive year winning at least one ATP title.

Čilić reached the quarterfinal of the French Open for the first time in his career and thus became one of the few tennis players who reached the quarterfinal stage of every major championship.

In June, at the Queen's Club Championships, Marin made the final for the third time in his career. There he faced Feliciano López, losing in three sets, after having a championship point in the final-set tiebreaker. At Wimbledon, Čilić reached the quarterfinals without dropping a set. There, he defeated Gilles Müller in five sets to reach his first Wimbledon semifinal. In the semifinal he recovered from a one set deficit to defeat Sam Querrey in four sets. In the final he was defeated by Roger Federer in straight sets, struggling with blisters on his left foot.

An adductor injury forced Čilić to miss the Montreal and Cincinnati Masters events. Čilić returned to play at the US Open where he lost to Diego Schwartzman in the third round. Despite this, following the tournament's conclusion Čilić broke into the top five for the first time in his career.

In October, Čilić reached the semifinals of the Tokyo, Shanghai, Basel, and the quarterfinals of the Paris Masters. Čilić failed to win a match in the ATP Finals despite going to three sets against Federer, Alexander Zverev, and Jack Sock. Čilić finished the season as world No. 6 for the second consecutive year.

=== 2018: Australian final, Davis Cup champion, world No. 3 ===
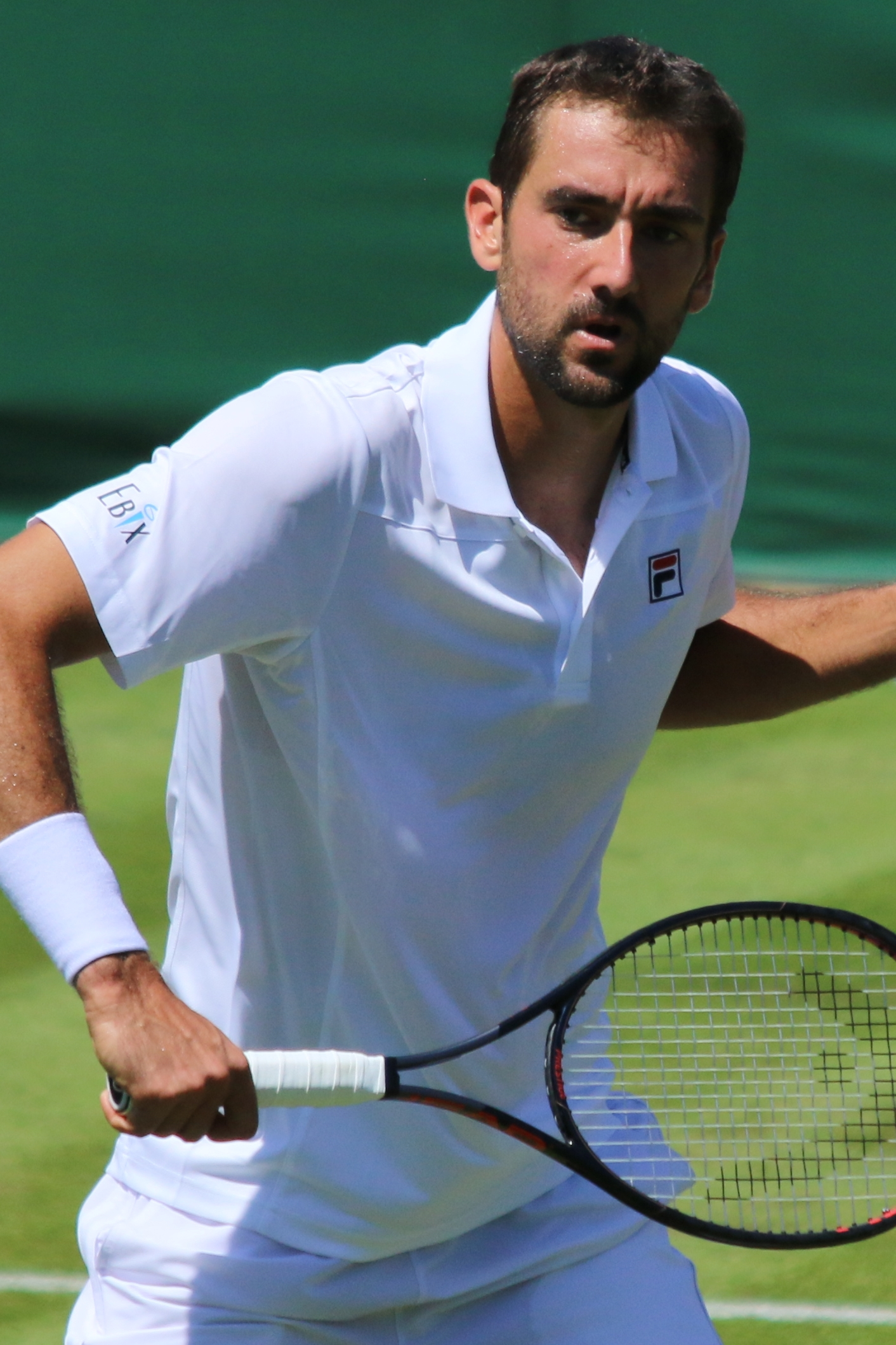
Čilić at the 2018 Wimbledon Championships

Čilić started his 2018 season as first seed in Pune, India. He lost in semifinals to eventual champion Gilles Simon.

Despite mixed form since his Wimbledon campaign, Čilić defeated world No. 1, Rafael Nadal, at the Australian Open after the Spaniard retired hurt in the fifth set, going on to reach another Grand-Slam final against Federer. This made him the first Croatian to ever reach the singles final at Melbourne Park. He eventually lost in five sets. The match garnered minor criticism from some tennis pundits for being played indoors to favour Federer, despite the Australian Open traditionally being an outdoor event. Čilić later admitted that he found it difficult to adjust to the changed conditions. However, it remained disputed that who among the two players was going to be favored in indoor conditions. At the conclusion of the tournament, Čilić reached a career-high ATP ranking of No. 3. He remained at that position for 12 weeks, before being surpassed by Alexander Zverev.

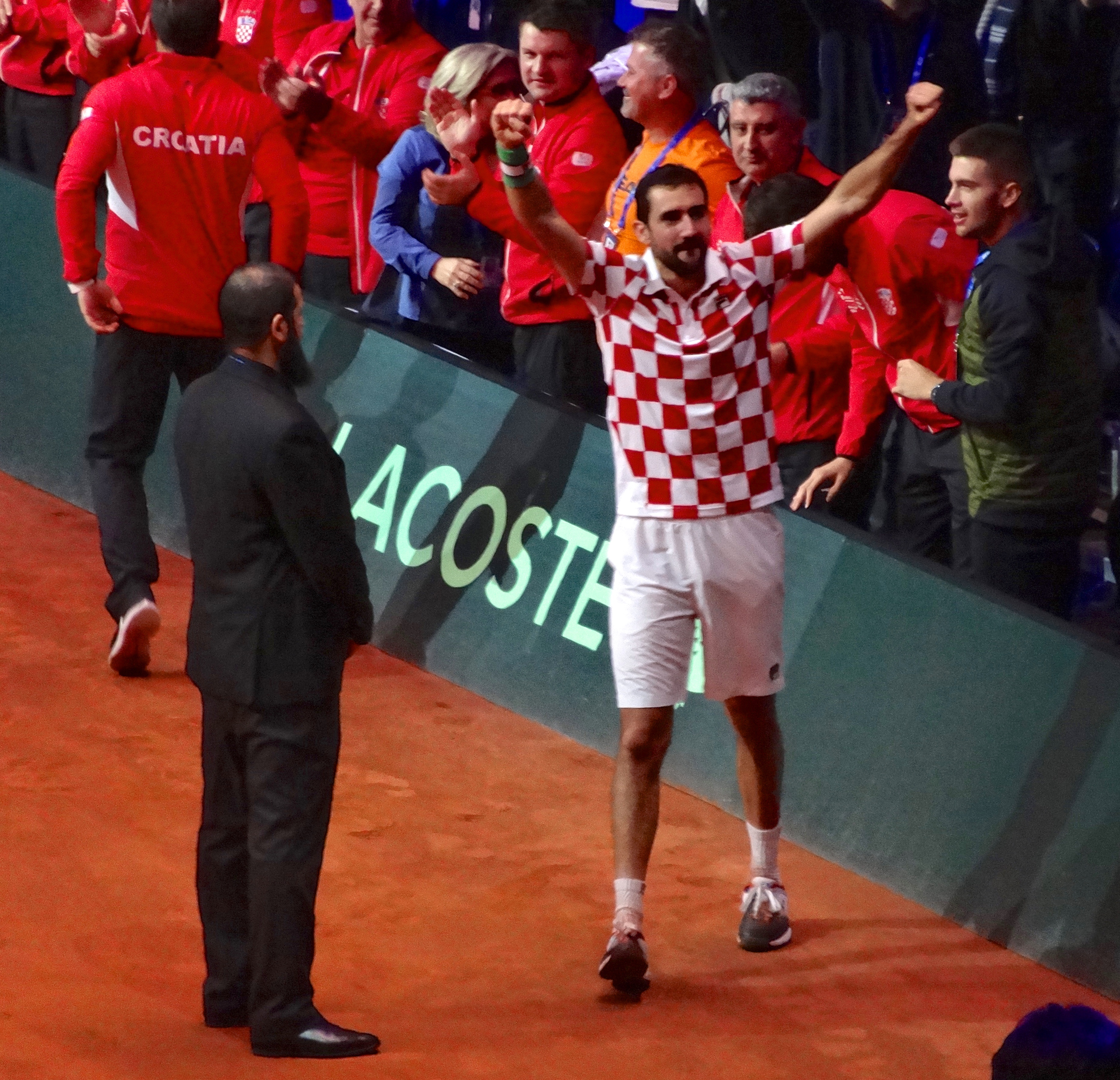
Čilić after victory vs Jo-Wilfried Tsonga, 2018 Davis Cup, final

In the first two Masters 1000 events of the season Čilić was defeated by Philipp Kohlschreiber (at Indian Wells, in the round of 32) and John Isner, the eventual champion of Miami. In the clay-court season, Čilić played four tournaments reaching the quarterfinals of Monte Carlo, the semifinals of Rome, and the quarterfinals at the French Open. Čilić failed to defend his only title from the 2017 season at Istanbul, losing in his opening match to Malek Jaziri. This defeat marked the first time since February 2014 that Čilić had not held any tournament on the ATP Tour.

At Queen's Club, Čilić was the top seed. He reached the final, where he contested a close match with Djokovic, coming out on top in three sets and saving a match point on his serve to claim his second title at Queen's Club and second career win over Djokovic. At Wimbledon, he was drawn in the top half and was considered one of the biggest threats to Roger Federer's title defense. He was upset in the second round by Guido Pella in five sets, after comfortably winning the first two sets.

During the North American summer hard-court swing, Čilić made strong showings in Toronto and Cincinnati, losing in both tournaments to the eventual champion in tight three setters (Rafael Nadal in Toronto and Novak Djokovic in Cincinnati). At the US Open, Čilić recovered from a two-set deficit to defeat teenager Alex de Minaur in the third round. Čilić eventually lost in the quarterfinals against Kei Nishikori in a rematch of the 2014 final.

Čilić helped Croatia reach the Davis Cup finals for the second time in three years, winning one of his two singles rubbers against the USA. In October, Čilić suffered a string of early exits at Tokyo, Shanghai, and Basel. He rebounded from this trough in form at the Paris Masters reaching the quarterfinals for a third consecutive year before losing to Djokovic in three sets. By winning a set he ended the Serb's streak of 30 consecutive sets won.

Čilić qualified for the Tour Finals for a third successive time and fourth time overall. His disappointing record at the event continued winning only one of his three round-robin matches, bringing his overall record at the event to 2–10.

Čilić led the Croatian national team at the 2018 Davis Cup final against France on the clay courts of Lille. After comfortably defeating Tsonga in his first match, Čilić found himself in the same position he was in the 2016 final, having to win his second rubber to guarantee Croatia the title. This time however, Čilić defeated his opponent, Lucas Pouille, in straight sets to grab the decisive victory for Croatia.

=== 2019: 500th career win, fall from top 30 ===
Čilić started his year at Australian Open. In his third round match against Fernando Verdasco, Čilić saved two match points and came back from a two set deficit to advance to the fourth round. This was the seventh time in Čilić's career that he had won a match after being down two sets. In the fourth round, Čilić was upset by an in-form Roberto Bautista Agut.

Over his next three tournaments, Čilić only managed to win one match, while being eliminated early at Dubai, Indian Wells, and Miami. As a result of his poor form in the early hard court season, Čilić fell from the world's top ten for the first time in over two years.

After another two winless tournaments to start the clay court season (at Monte-Carlo and Budapest), Čilić finally broke his slump at the Madrid Masters by winning three consecutive matches against Martin Kližan, Jan-Lennard Struff, & Laslo Djere on the way to the quarterfinals. However, he had to withdraw before his match against Djokovic due to food poisoning. By reaching the quarterfinals, Čilić became one of the few players on the Tour to reach the quarterfinal stage of all nine Masters 1000 tournaments. Čilić lost his second round match at both Rome and the French Open, to Jan-Lennard Struff and Grigor Dimitrov respectively.

Čilić failed to defend his Queen's Club title, leaving the Croat out of the top 15 for the first time in five years. This also marked the first time since August 2008 that Čilić had not reached a tournament final in over a year. Čilić lost in the second round of Wimbledon to João Sousa in straight sets.

In the North American summer hard-court season, Čilić competed in Washington, Montreal, Cincinnati, and the US Open in New York. Čilić fell from the world's top 20 after failing to match his previous year's performance at the first three events. At the US Open, Čilić reached the fourth round where he showed improvements to form during a four set loss against eventual champion Nadal.

On 17 October 2019, he reached his 500th career match win at the 2019 Kremlin Cup in Moscow becoming the 10th active player in the list. Čilić ended the year ranked No. 39 in the ATP rankings. It marked the first time that he had failed to win a singles title since 2007.

=== 2020–2021: Olympic silver medal, top 30 ===
Čilić started the 2020 season at the Australian Open where he beat Corentin Moutet, Benoît Paire, and Roberto Bautista Agut before losing to Milos Raonic in straight sets. At the Open 13, Čilić lost in the round of 16 to Denis Shapovalov. He lost in the first rounds of the Dubai Tennis Championships and the Cincinnati Masters to Benoît Paire and Shapovalov respectively. At the US Open, he beat Denis Kudla and Norbert Gombos before losing to Dominic Thiem in four sets. He was once again defeated by Thiem in the first round of the French Open in straight sets.

Čilić began the 2021 season at the Murray River Open, where he lost in the first round to Jérémy Chardy despite having five match points in the third-set tiebreak. At the Australian Open, he lost to 18th seed Grigor Dimitrov in the first round.

At the French Open, he was defeated in the second round by Roger Federer in four sets.

In June, Čilić won the Stuttgart Open, defeating third seed Félix Auger-Aliassime in the final in straight sets to win his 19th singles title and first in three years. At Wimbledon, he reached third round where he was knocked out by Daniil Medvedev after winning the first two sets.

In July, Čilić competed at the postponed Tokyo Olympics and reached the second round in singles where he lost to Pablo Carreño Busta. In the doubles tournament, he and Ivan Dodig reached the final, where they lost to compatriots Mate Pavić and Nikola Mektić. It was the third time in the Olympics men's doubles' history that the same country won both gold and silver, and the first one since 1908.

At the US Open, Čilić retired in the first round in the fifth set against Philipp Kohlschreiber. It was his first retirement in more than 800 matches on the tour and the first time he had failed to make it past the opening round at Flushing Meadows in 13 attempts.

Čilić then competed at the Kremlin Cup as the sixth seed where he reached the final. He beat Damir Dzumhur in three sets before defeating Tommy Paul in straight sets. He once again won in straight sets against Pedro Martínez in the quarterfinals and against Ričardis Berankis in the semifinals. He lost to Aslan Karatsev in straight sets in the final.

The following week, Čilić won the St. Petersburg Open, defeating fifth seed Taylor Fritz in a three-sets final to win his 20th singles title. On the way to the title, he also defeated Albert Ramos Viñolas, Karen Khachanov, Roberto Bautista Agut and Botic van de Zandschulp. With this title he became only the sixth active player in 2021 with 20 titles after Federer, Nadal, Djokovic, Murray and del Potro. He also returned to the top 30 after to years to World No. 28 on 1 November 2021.

=== 2022: French Open semifinal and top 15 ===
At the Adelaide International 1 tournament, Čilić recorded his 550th win and became one of only seven active players to have over 550 wins and 40th man overall in the Open Era.

Čilić then entered the Australian Open as the 27th seed. He defeated Emilio Gómez in the first round in straight sets, Norbert Gombos in the second round in four sets, and fifth seed Andrey Rublev in the third round in four sets. He lost to ninth seed Félix Auger-Aliassime in the fourth round in four sets.

At the French Open, Čilić defeated Attila Balazs in the first round, Marton Fucsovics in the second, Gilles Simon in the third before taking out number 2 seed Daniil Medvedev in straight sets in the round of 16. With this result, he secured his return into the top 20 in the rankings. He won against Andrey Rublev in the quarterfinals in a long five sets match with a super tiebreak in the fifth — the first ever played on Court Philippe Chatrier — winning the last 9 points in a row and lasting 4 hours and 10 minutes to reach his first semifinal at this Major. He became only the 5th active player besides the Big Four, and the first Croatian player to reach the semifinals at all four majors. He then lost to Casper Ruud in the semifinals.

At the Canadian Open he recorded his 350th hard court win, becoming only the fifth active player, behind the Big Four, to achieve this milestone.

At the US Open, Čilić defeated Dan Evans in the third round. In the fourth round, he lost to eventual champion Carlos Alcaraz in a five-set match lasting nearly four hours.

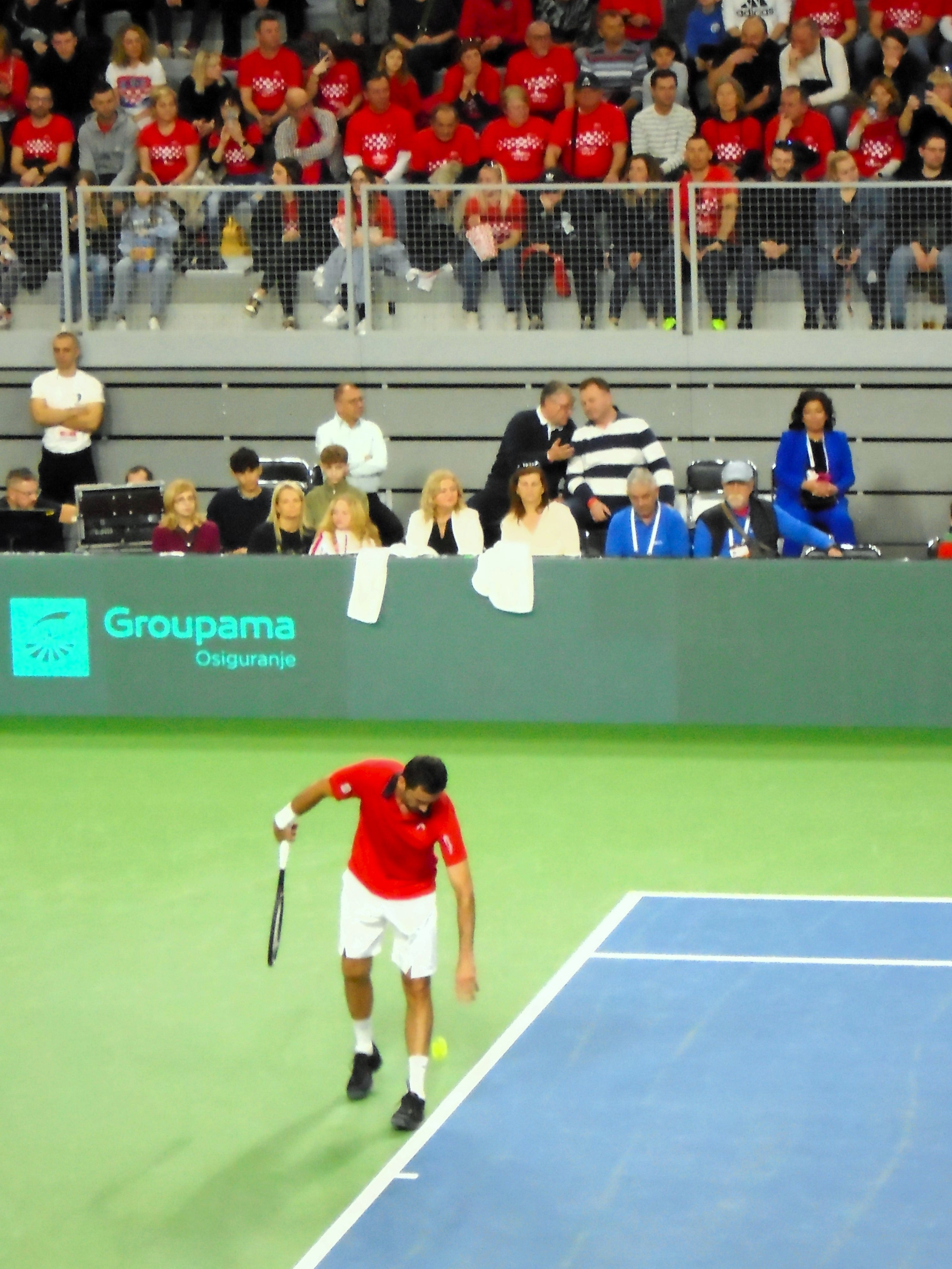
Čilić at the 2024 Davis Cup in Varaždin

In October, Čilić reached the final of the Tel Aviv Open, where he lost in straight sets to No. 1 seed Novak Djokovic, who was playing his first official tournament since winning Wimbledon. As a result, he returned to the top 15 in the rankings at world No. 14 on 3 October 2022.

=== 2023–25: Lowest ranked ATP titlist, back to Majors & top 100, top 5 win ===
In the first week of 2023, Čilić reached the quarterfinals in Pune, but injured his knee during the tournament and pulled out before his match against eventual champion Tallon Griekspoor. He did not play in any further tournaments since his injury and fell out of the top 100 until his return at the Croatia Open in Umag.

In 2024, after another long hiatus, Čilić returned to the ATP Tour at the 2024 Hong Kong Open using a protected ranking. He also competed at the 2024 Australian Open using a protected ranking. Čilić then received a wildcard for the Argentina Open. He also entered the Monte-Carlo Masters and the Mutua Madrid Open using a protected ranking, but withdrew before the tournaments began. In May 2024, he withdrew from the French Open having undergone knee surgery. In August 2024, after a six-month hiatus, he returned to the 2024 Manacor Challenger and defeated Alberto Barroso Campos in the first round.

Ranked No. 777, Čilić reached the semifinals at the 2024 Hangzhou Open as a wildcard with wins over two Japanese players, eighth seed Yoshihito Nishioka and qualifier Yasutaka Uchiyama, saving two match points against the latter. Next he defeated fourth seed Brandon Nakashima to reach his 37th final and first in two years since September 2022 in Tel Aviv. As a result, he became the second lowest-ranked finalist after Raemon Sluiter in 2009 in 's-Hertogenbosch. With his win over sixth seed Zhang Zhizhen in the final, Čilić clinched his 21st title and 16th on hardcourts, becoming the lowest ranked player to win a title since the current ATP ranking system's introduction in 1973. As a result, he returned to the top 250 in the singles rankings, raising more than 500 positions on 23 September 2024.

Ranked No. 187 at the 2025 Dubai Tennis Championships, Čilić reached the quarterfinals defeating top-10 player and sixth seed Alex de Minaur and another Australian Alexei Popyrin, and rose more than 45 positions up, returning to the top 150 in the singles rankings.

Čilić won his first Challenger title in 17 years and 10 months at the 2025 Girona Challenger (since Rijeka, Croatia in 2007) breaking Andy Murray's record for the longest gap in winning titles on the ATP Challenger Tour.

Ranked No. 109, Čilić played in the 2025 French Open, his first French Open appearance since 2022 and his first Grand Slam tournament since the 2024 Australian Open, having been given a place in the main draw as a lucky loser after losing in the last round of qualifying to Lloyd Harris. This was the first time that Čilić had played in the qualifying competition of a major since the 2007 US Open. He lost in the first round to Flavio Cobolli.

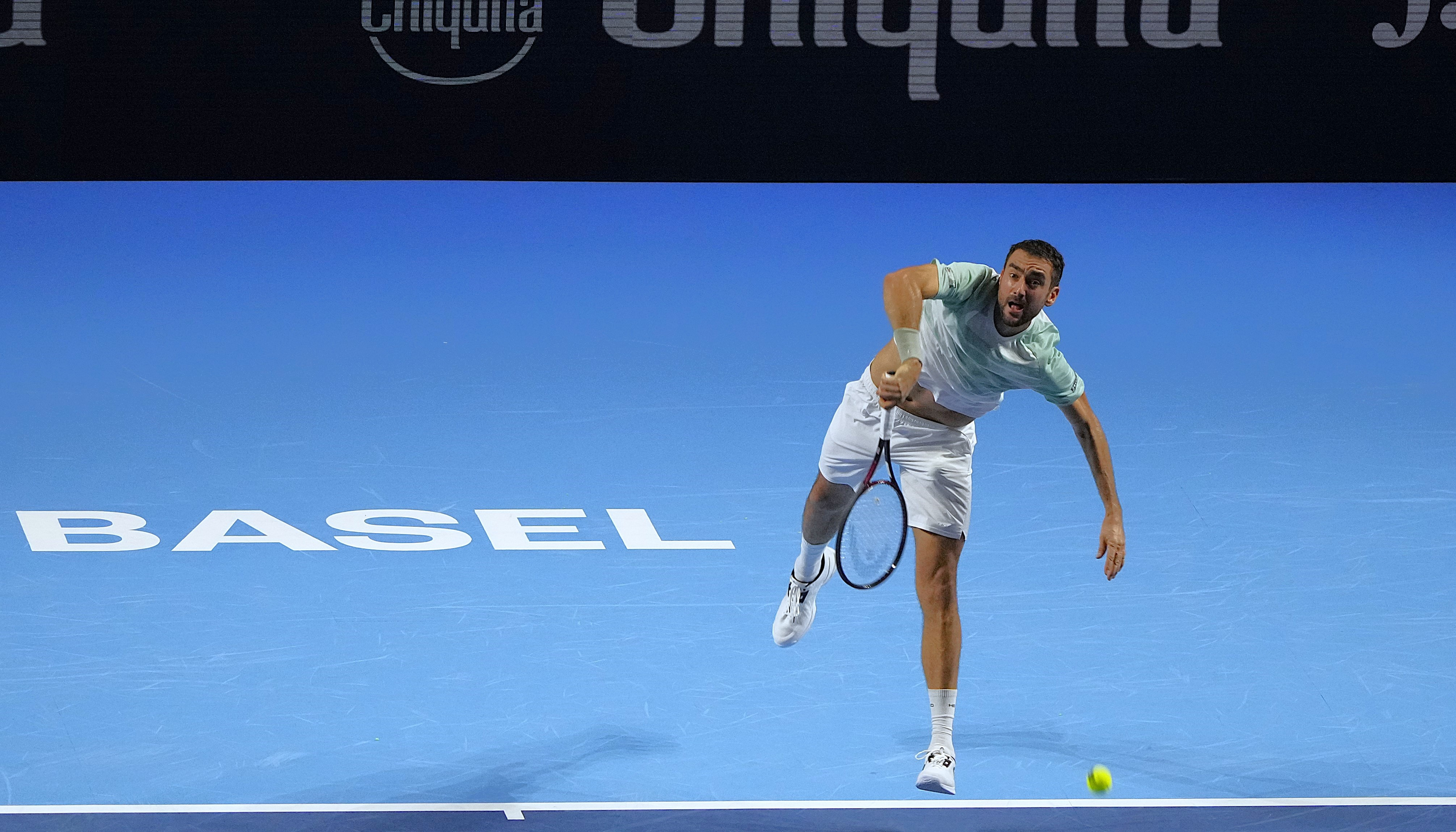
Marin Čilić, Swiss Indoors Basel 2025

At the Lexus Nottingham Open Čilić lifted another Challenger title after reaching his third final for the season and returned to the top 100 in the singles rankings on 23 June 2025. At 36 and eight months, Čilić became the oldest grass court champion in Challenger history. He received a direct main draw entry for the 2025 Wimbledon Championships following a four-year absence at the tournament and upset world No. 4 Jack Draper in the second round. It was his first Top 5 win since knocking out then No. 2-ranked Daniil Medvedev in the fourth round at the 2022 French Open.

Marin Cilic lost in the round of 16 at the 2025 Swiss Indoors against Felix Auger-Aliassime, who was a finalist at the Paris Masters 2025.

=== 2026: 600th career win ===
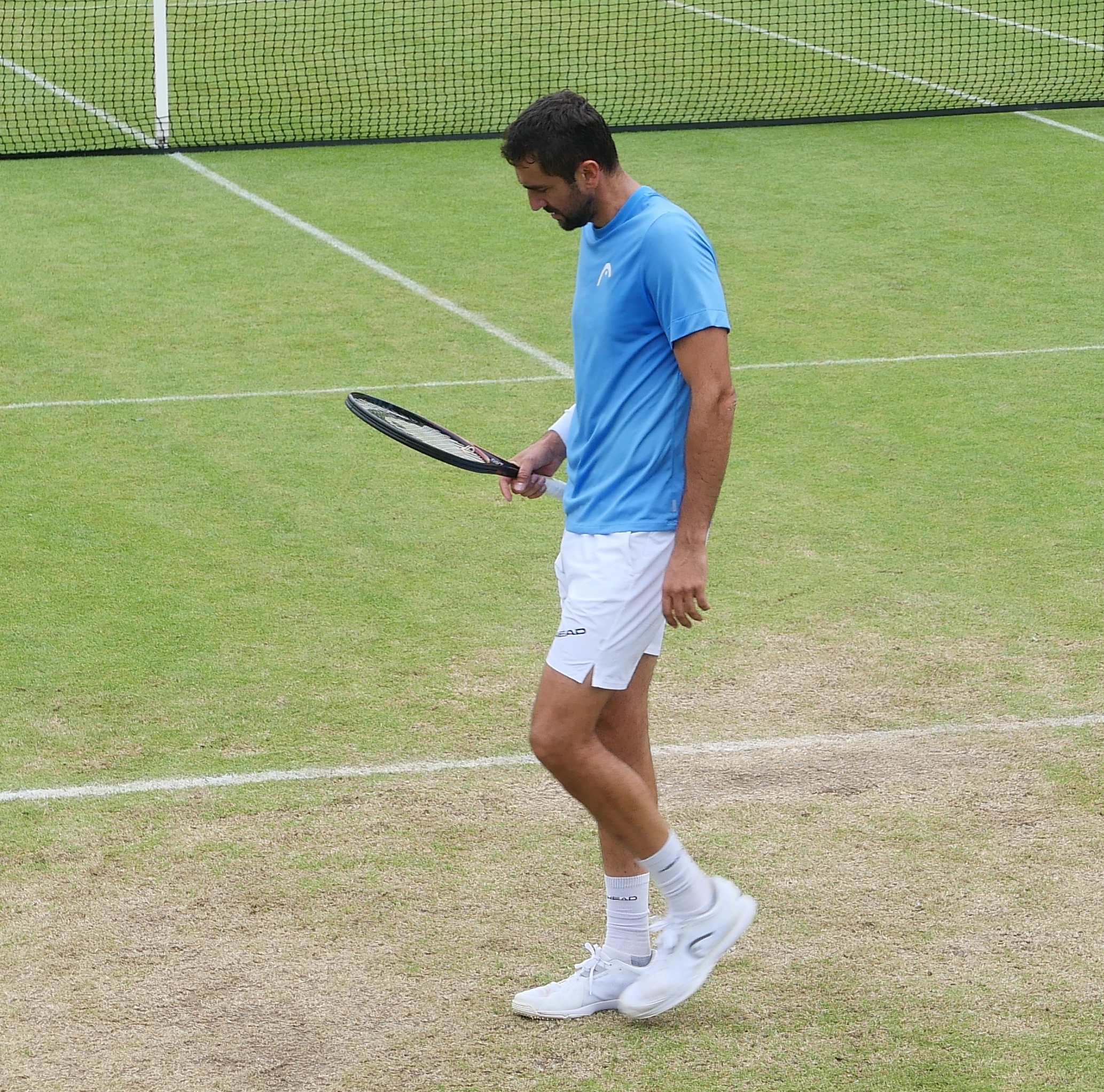
Čilić at the 2026 Libéma Open

With his second round win over Denis Shapovalov at the 2026 Australian Open, Čilić recorded his 599th victory in the ATP Tour, tied with compatriot Goran Ivanišević. He then lost in the third round to Casper Ruud.

At the Dallas Open, Čilić recorded his 600th career win, the first man born in 1988 or later to reach the milestone, and the second active player after Djokovic.

At the Libéma Open, he won against Denis Shapovalov in the first and Nuno Borges in the second round respectively, but lost to Daniil Medvedev in the quarterfinals.

At the French Open, he lost in the first round to Moïse Kouamé and at Wimbledon he suffered another first round exit to Daniil Medvedev.

== Clothing and equipment ==
As of 2018 Čilić plays with the Head YouTek Radical MidPlus with a custom drilled 16x19 string pattern, painted to look like the Head Graphene Touch Prestige Mid. For strings he uses a hybrid of Babolat VS Touch mains and Luxilon ALU Power crosses. He wore Fila apparel until the 2011 season, when he got a 5-year contract with Li-Ning, switching back to Fila in 2016. At the start of the 2020 season, Čilić started wearing Head apparel.

== Career statistics ==
=== Grand Slam tournament performance timeline ===
Key
W	F	SF	QF	#R	RR	Q#	DNQ	A	NH

(W) winner; (F) finalist; (SF) semifinalist; (QF) quarterfinalist; (#R) rounds 4, 3, 2, 1; (RR) round-robin stage; (Q#) qualification round; (DNQ) did not qualify; (A) absent; (NH) not held; (SR) strike rate (events won / competed); (W–L) win–loss record.
To avoid confusion and double counting, these charts are updated at the conclusion of a tournament or when the player's participation has ended.

Current through the 2026 US Open.

Tournament	2006	2007	2008	2009	2010	2011	2012	2013	2014	2015	2016	2017	2018	2019	2020	2021	2022	2023	2024	2025	2026	SR	W–L	Win%
Australian Open	A	1R	4R	4R	SF	4R	A	3R	2R	A	3R	2R	F	4R	4R	1R	4R	A	1R	A	3R	0 / 16	37–16	70%
French Open	Q2	1R	2R	4R	4R	1R	3R	3R	3R	4R	1R	QF	QF	2R	1R	2R	SF	A	A	1R	1R	0 / 18	31–18	63%
Wimbledon	A	1R	4R	3R	1R	1R	4R	2R	QF	QF	QF	F	2R	2R	NH	3R	A	A	A	4R	1R	0 / 15	34–15	71%
US Open	Q1	Q1	3R	QF	2R	3R	QF	A	W	SF	3R	3R	QF	4R	3R	1R	4R	A	A	1R	A	1 / 15	41–14	75%
Win–loss	0–0	0–3	9–4	12–4	9–4	5–4	9–3	5–2	14–3	12–3	8–4	13–4	15–4	8–4	5–3	3–4	11–3	0–0	0–1	3–3	2–3	1 / 64	143–63	70%

- Čilić withdrew before the second round match at the 2013 Wimbledon.

=== Finals: 3 (1 title, 2 runner-ups) ===
Result	Year	Championship	Surface	Opponent	Score
Win	2014	US Open	Hard	(Japan) Kei Nishikori	6–3, 6–3, 6–3
Loss	2017	Wimbledon	Grass	(Switzerland) Roger Federer	3–6, 1–6, 4–6
Loss	2018	Australian Open	Hard	(Switzerland) Roger Federer	2–6, 7–6^{(7–5)}, 3–6, 6–3, 1–6

Awards
Preceded by (United States) Bob Bryan & (United States) Mike Bryan	Arthur Ashe Humanitarian of the Year; 2016	Succeeded by (Romania) Horia Tecău
