= 2014 Aircel Chennai Open =

- Date: 30 December 2013 – 5 January 2014
- Edition: 19th
- Category: World Tour 250
- Draw: 28S / 16D
- Prize money: $399,985
- Surface: Hard / outdoor
- Location: Chennai, India

Champions

Singles
- (Switzerland) Stanislas Wawrinka

Doubles
- (Sweden) Johan Brunström / (Denmark) Frederik Nielsen
- Maharashtra Open

The 2014 Aircel Chennai Open was a men's tennis tournament, played on outdoor hard courts that was part of the ATP World Tour 250 series of the 2014 ATP World Tour. It was the 19th edition of the only ATP tournament taking place in India and was played at the SDAT Tennis Stadium in Chennai from 30 December 2013 until 5 January 2014. First-seeded Stanislas Wawrinka won the singles title.

== Finals ==
=== Singles ===
- (Switzerland) Stanislas Wawrinka defeated (France) Édouard Roger-Vasselin, 7–5, 6–2

=== Doubles ===
- (Sweden) Johan Brunström / (Denmark) Frederik Nielsen defeated (Croatia) Marin Draganja / (Croatia) Mate Pavić, 6–2, 4–6, [10–7]

== Points and prize money ==
=== Point distribution ===
Event	W	F	SF	QF	Round of 16	Round of 32	Q	Q3	Q2	Q1
Singles	250	150	90	45	20	0	12	6	0	0
Doubles	250	150	90	45	0	—N/a	—N/a	—N/a	—N/a	—N/a

=== Prize money ===
Event	W	F	SF	QF	Round of 16	Round of 32	Q3	Q2	Q1
Singles	$72,490	$38,180	$20,680	$11,785	$6,940	$4,115	$665	$320	—N/a
Doubles *	$22,020	$11,580	$6,270	$3,590	$2,100	—N/a	—N/a	—N/a	—N/a

_{* per team}

== Singles main-draw entrants ==
=== Seeds ===
Country	Player	Rank^{1}	Seed
SUI	Stanislas Wawrinka	8	1
RUS	Mikhail Youzhny	15	2
ITA	Fabio Fognini	16	3
FRA	Benoît Paire	26	4
CAN	Vasek Pospisil	32	5
ESP	Marcel Granollers	38	6
FRA	Édouard Roger-Vasselin	52	7
ESP	Roberto Bautista Agut	58	8

- ^{1} Rankings as of 23 December 2013

=== Other entrants ===
The following players received wildcards into the singles main draw:

- (India) Yuki Bhambri
- (United Kingdom) Kyle Edmund
- (India) Jeevan Nedunchezhiyan

The following players received entry from the qualifying draw:

- (Moldova) Radu Albot
- (Russia) Alexander Kudryavtsev
- (Switzerland) Henri Laaksonen
- (India) Ramkumar Ramanathan

=== Withdrawals ===
Before the tournament

- (Serbia) Janko Tipsarević (achillar tendon injury) → replaced by (India) Somdev Devvarman
- (Estonia) Jürgen Zopp (back injury) → replaced by (Kazakhstan) Aleksandr Nedovyesov

During the tournament

- (Chinese Taipei) Lu Yen-hsun (right thigh strain)

=== Retirements ===
- (Italy) Fabio Fognini (left leg strain)
- (Russia) Alexander Kudryavtsev (right groin injury)
- (Canada) Vasek Pospisil (lower back strain)
- (Germany) Julian Reister (sickness)
- (Russia) Mikhail Youzhny (sickness)

== ATP doubles main-draw entrants ==
=== Seeds ===
Country	Player	Country	Player	Rank^{1}	Seed
IND	Rohan Bopanna	PAK	Aisam-ul-Haq Qureshi	28	1
~~ITA~~	~~Fabio Fognini~~	~~IND~~	~~Leander Paes~~	~~46~~	~~2~~
GER	Andre Begemann	GER	Martin Emmrich	91	3
SWE	Johan Brunström	DEN	Frederik Nielsen	106	4

- ^{1} Rankings as of 23 December 2013

=== Other entrants ===
The following pairs received wildcards into the doubles main draw:

- (India) Sriram Balaji / (India) Ramkumar Ramanathan
- (Russia) Karen Khachanov / (India) Saketh Myneni

=== Withdrawals ===
During the tournament

- (Italy) Fabio Fognini (left leg strain)

=== Retirements ===
- (Chinese Taipei) Yen-hsun Lu (right thigh strain)
