= 2014 Aircel Chennai Open – Singles =

Singles
- 2014 Aircel Chennai Open

Final
- Champion: (Switzerland) Stanislas Wawrinka
- Runner-up: (France) Édouard Roger-Vasselin
- Score: 7–5, 6–2

Details
- Draw: 28 (4 Q / 3 WC )
- Seeds: 8

Events
Singles	Doubles
← 2013 ·	Maharashtra Open	· 2015 →

Janko Tipsarević was the defending champion, but he withdrew because of an injury.
Stanislas Wawrinka won the title, defeating Édouard Roger-Vasselin in the final, 7–5, 6–2. He did not lose a single set in the entire tournament.

== Seeds ==
The top four seeds received a bye into the second round.

1. (Switzerland) Stanislas Wawrinka (champion)
2. (Russia) Mikhail Youzhny (second round, retired)
3. (Italy) Fabio Fognini (second round, retired)
4. (France) Benoît Paire (quarterfinals)
5. (Canada) Vasek Pospisil (semifinals, retired)
6. (Spain) Marcel Granollers (semifinals)
7. (France) Édouard Roger-Vasselin (final)
8. (Spain) Roberto Bautista Agut (first round)

== Draw ==
=== Finals ===
Semifinals
1	(Switzerland) Stanislas Wawrinka	6	5
5	(Canada) Vasek Pospisil	4	5^{r}
6	(Spain) Marcel Granollers	2	6	3
7	(France) Édouard Roger-Vasselin	6	4	6

Final
1	(Switzerland) Stanislas Wawrinka	7	6
7	(France) Édouard Roger-Vasselin	5	2

=== Top half ===
First round
(Germany) B Becker	6	2
(Germany) J Reister	4	1^{r}
Q	(Switzerland) H Laaksonen	3	7	6^{0}
(Slovenia) A Bedene	6	5	7^{7}
Q	(Russia) A Kudryavtsev	6	3	6
8	(Spain) R Bautista Agut	4	6	3
(Spain) P Carreño Busta	4	3
WC	(India) Y Bhambri	6	6
(Chinese Taipei) Y Lu	6	6
(United States) T Smyczek	4	2
WC	(United Kingdom) K Edmund	3	5
5	(Canada) V Pospisil	6	7

Second round
1	(Switzerland) S Wawrinka	6	6
(Germany) B Becker	3	1
(Slovenia) A Bedene	1	3
Q	(Russia) A Kudryavtsev	6	0^{r}
3	(Italy) F Fognini	1	5^{r}
WC	(India) Y Bhambri	6	5
(Chinese Taipei) Y Lu
5	(Canada) V Pospisil	w/o

Quarterfinals
1	(Switzerland) S Wawrinka	6	6
(Slovenia) A Bedene	2	1
WC	(India) Y Bhambri	3	3
5	(Canada) V Pospisil	6	6

Semifinals
1	(Switzerland) S Wawrinka	6	5
5	(Canada) V Pospisil	4	5^{r}

=== Bottom half ===
First round
6	(Spain) M Granollers	6	3	6
Q	(Moldova) R Albot	4	6	0
(India) S Devvarman	6	3	4
Q	(India) R Ramanathan	4	6	6
(Spain) G García López	7	6
(Kazakhstan) O Nedovyesov	5	0
7	(France) É Roger-Vasselin	6	6
(Spain) A Ramos	1	3
WC	(India) J Nedunchezhiyan	5	2
(Czech Republic) J Veselý	7	6
(Israel) D Sela	6	6
(Slovakia) L Lacko	4	2

Second round
6	(Spain) M Granollers	6	6
Q	(India) R Ramanathan	2	4
(Spain) G García López	1	4
4	(France) B Paire	6	6
7	(France) É Roger-Vasselin	6	6
(Czech Republic) J Veselý	4	4
(Israel) D Sela	3
2	(Russia) M Youzhny	1^{r}

Quarterfinals
6	(Spain) M Granollers	6	3	7^{7}
4	(France) B Paire	2	6	6^{5}
7	(France) É Roger-Vasselin	7	6^{6}	6
(Israel) D Sela	5	7^{8}	0

Semifinals
6	(Spain) M Granollers	2	6	3
7	(France) É Roger-Vasselin	6	4	6

== Qualifying ==
=== Seeds ===
1. (Ukraine) Sergiy Stakhovsky (first round)
2. (Japan) Go Soeda (second round)
3. (Serbia) Dušan Lajović (second round)
4. (United States) Rajeev Ram (second round)
5. (Slovakia) Andrej Martin (first round)
6. (Ukraine) Illya Marchenko (qualifying competition)
7. (Moldova) Radu Albot (qualified)
8. (Hungary) Márton Fucsovics (first round)

=== Qualifiers ===
1. (Russia) Alexander Kudryavtsev
2. (Switzerland) Henri Laaksonen
3. (India) Ramkumar Ramanathan
4. (Moldova) Radu Albot

=== Qualifying draw ===
==== First qualifier ====
First round
1	(Ukraine) Sergiy Stakhovsky	1	6	4
(Russia) Alexander Kudryavtsev	6	4	6
(Russia) Karen Khachanov	6	6
(Japan) Hiroki Moriya	2	4
WC	(India) Ajai Selvaraj	0	0
(India) Sanam Singh	6	6
(Denmark) Frederik Nielsen	6	6
8	(Hungary) Márton Fucsovics	3	2

Second round
(Russia) Alexander Kudryavtsev	7^{11}	6
(Russia) Karen Khachanov	6^{9}	3
(India) Sanam Singh	5	5
(Denmark) Frederik Nielsen	7	7

Qualifying competition
(Russia) Alexander Kudryavtsev	6	6
(Denmark) Frederik Nielsen	4	4

==== Second qualifier ====
First round
2	(Japan) Go Soeda	7^{7}	7
WC	(India) Mohit Mayur Jayaprakash	6^{2}	5
(Switzerland) Henri Laaksonen	6	5	6
(India) N. Sriram Balaji	1	7	4
(Croatia) Mate Pavić	4	6^{3}
(Italy) Alessandro Giannessi	6	7^{7}
(Italy) Flavio Cipolla	3	0
6	(Ukraine) Illya Marchenko	6	6

Second round
2	(Japan) Go Soeda	5	4
(Switzerland) Henri Laaksonen	7	6
(Italy) Alessandro Giannessi	3	4
6	(Ukraine) Illya Marchenko	6	6

Qualifying competition
(Switzerland) Henri Laaksonen	4	6	7
6	(Ukraine) Illya Marchenko	6	3	5

==== Third qualifier ====
First round
3	(Serbia) Dušan Lajović	6	6
WC	(India) Sasikumar Mukund	3	4
(Slovakia) Norbert Gombos	7	7^{9}
(Monaco) Benjamin Balleret	5	6^{7}
(India) Ramkumar Ramanathan	6	6
WC	(India) Sumit Nagal	2	0
(Russia) Mikhail Elgin	0	7^{7}	6
5	(Slovakia) Andrej Martin	6	6^{5}	0

Second round
3	(Serbia) Dušan Lajović	6	1	4
(Slovakia) Norbert Gombos	2	6	6
(India) Ramkumar Ramanathan	6	7
(Russia) Mikhail Elgin	3	5

Qualifying competition
(Slovakia) Norbert Gombos	6^{3}	6	3
(India) Ramkumar Ramanathan	7^{7}	3	6

==== Fourth qualifier ====
First round
4	(United States) Rajeev Ram	3	6	3
(Italy) Lorenzo Giustino	6	4	2^{r}
(India) Saketh Myneni	3	4
(Austria) Philipp Oswald	6	6
(India) Vijay Sundar Prashanth	4	1
(China) Zhang Ze	6	6
(Japan) Yasutaka Uchiyama	6	6^{4}	1
7	(Moldova) Radu Albot	3	7^{7}	6

Second round
4	(United States) Rajeev Ram	1	6	5
(Austria) Philipp Oswald	6	3	7
(China) Zhang Ze	6^{2}	3
7	(Moldova) Radu Albot	7^{7}	6

Qualifying competition
(Austria) Philipp Oswald	3	4
7	(Moldova) Radu Albot	6	6
