= 2012 Aircel Chennai Open =

- Date: 2–8 January
- Edition: 17th
- Category: 250 series
- Draw: 32S / 16D
- Prize money: $398,250
- Surface: Hard / outdoor
- Location: Chennai, India
- Venue: SDAT Tennis Stadium

Champions

Singles
- (Canada) Milos Raonic

Doubles
- (India) Leander Paes / (Serbia) Janko Tipsarević
- Aircel Chennai Open

The 2012 Aircel Chennai Open was a 2012 ATP World Tour tennis tournament, played on outdoor hard courts. It was the 17th edition of the only ATP tournament taking place in India and took place at the SDAT Tennis Stadium in Chennai, India. It was held from 2 to 8 January 2012. Stanislas Wawrinka was the defending singles champion coming into the tournament but was knocked out in the quarterfinals. Former champion Marin Čilić was originally in the field as the 4th seed before pulling out with a patellar tendon injury. Finally, fourth seed Milos Raonic from Canada defeated world no. 9 and top seeded Serb Janko Tipsarević to win only his second ATP title. Raonic became the first player since Roger Federer in 2008 to win an ATP title without losing a serve. The doubles title went to the Indo-Serb pair of Leander Paes and Janko Tipsarević after they defeated the Israeli pair of Jonathan Erlich and Andy Ram.

== Finals ==
=== Singles ===
(Canada) Milos Raonic defeated (Serbia) Janko Tipsarević, 6–7^{(4–7)}, 7–6^{(7–4)}, 7–6^{(7–4)}

=== Doubles ===
(India) Leander Paes / (Serbia) Janko Tipsarević defeated (Israel) Jonathan Erlich / (Israel) Andy Ram, 6–4, 6–4

== ATP singles main-draw entrants ==
=== Seeds ===
| Country | Player | Rank | Seed |
|---|---|---|---|
| SRB | Janko Tipsarević | 9 | 1 |
| ESP | Nicolás Almagro | 10 | 2 |
| SUI | Stanislas Wawrinka | 17 | 3 |
| CAN | Milos Raonic | 31 | 4 |
| CRO | Ivan Dodig | 36 | 5 |
| ITA | Fabio Fognini | 48 | 6 |
| BEL | Xavier Malisse | 49 | 7 |
| BEL | Olivier Rochus | 67 | 8 |

- Rankings as of 26 December 2011

=== Other entrants ===
The following players have been announced as part of the singles main draw: Wild Cards

- (India) Yuki Bhambri
- (Belgium) David Goffin
- (India) Vishnu Vardhan

The following players received entry from the qualifying draw:

- (Japan) Yūichi Sugita
- (Japan) Go Soeda
- (Netherlands) Thiemo de Bakker
- (Canada) Vasek Pospisil

The following player received entry as Lucky loser:

- (France) Édouard Roger-Vasselin

=== Withdrawals ===
- (Croatia) Marin Čilić (patellar tendon injury)
- (Netherlands) Robin Haase (injury)
- (India) Somdev Devvarman (right shoulder injury)

=== Retirements ===
- (Belgium) Steve Darcis (right shoulder injury)

== ATP doubles main-draw entrants ==
=== Seeds ===
| Country | Player | Country | Player | Rank^{1} | Seed |
|---|---|---|---|---|---|
| IND | Mahesh Bhupathi | IND | Rohan Bopanna | 18 | 1 |
| USA | Scott Lipsky | USA | Rajeev Ram | 74 | 2 |
| IND | Leander Paes | SRB | Janko Tipsarević | 93 | 3 |
| ISR | Jonathan Erlich | ISR | Andy Ram | 101 | 4 |

- Rankings are as of 26 December 2011

=== Other entrants ===
The following pairs received wildcards into the doubles main draw:

- (India) Mohit Mayur Jayaprakash / (India) Ramkumar Ramanathan
- (India) Sriram Balaji / (India) Jeevan Nedunchezhiyan

The following pair received entry as alternates:

- (Canada) Vasek Pospisil / (Canada) Milos Raonic

=== Withdrawals ===
- (India) Somdev Devvarman (right shoulder injury)
