= 2023 Tata Open Maharashtra =

International Tennis tournament in India

- Date: 2–7 January
- Edition: 27th
- Draw: 28S / 16D
- Prize money: US$642,735
- Surface: Hard / outdoor
- Location: Pune, India
- Venue: Mhalunge Balewadi Tennis Complex

Champions

Singles
- (Netherlands) Tallon Griekspoor

Doubles
- (Belgium) Sander Gillé / (Belgium) Joran Vliegen
← 2022 ·	Maharashtra Open

The 2023 Maharashtra Open (branded as the Tata Open Maharashtra for sponsorship reasons) was a professional men's tennis tournament played on outdoor hard courts in Pune at the Mhalunge Balewadi Tennis Complex. It was the 27th edition of the Association of Tennis Professionals (ATP)'s 250 event, the only ATP tournament played in India, and was held from 2 January to 7 January 2023.

Tallon Griekspoor of Netherlands was the title holder in singles, and Belgium’s Sander Gillé and Joran Vliegen were the holders in doubles in 2023.

== Finals ==
=== Singles ===
- (Netherlands) Tallon Griekspoor def. (France) Benjamin Bonzi, 4–6, 7–5, 6–3

=== Doubles ===
- (Belgium) Sander Gillé / (Belgium) Joran Vliegen def. (India) Sriram Balaji / (India) Jeevan Nedunchezhiyan, 6–4, 6–4

== Points and prize money ==
=== Points distribution ===
Event	W	F	SF	QF	Round of 16	Round of 32	Q	Q2	Q1
Singles	250	150	90	45	20	0	12	6	0
Doubles*	250	150	90	45	20	0	—	—	—

_{*per team}

== Singles main draw entrants ==
=== Seeds ===
Country	Player	Rank^{†}	Seed
CRO	Marin Čilić	17	1
NED	Botic van de Zandschulp	35	2
FIN	Emil Ruusuvuori	40	3
ARG	Sebastián Báez	43	4
SVK	Alex Molčan	50	5
SRB	Filip Krajinović	54	6
ESP	Jaume Munar	58	7
	Aslan Karatsev	59	8

† Rankings are as of 26 December 2022

=== Other entrants ===
The following players received wildcard entry into the main draw:

- (India) Manas Manoj Dhamne
- (India) Sumit Nagal
- (India) Mukund Sasikumar

The following players received entry from the qualifying draw :

- (Italy) Flavio Cobolli
- (Germany) Maximilian Marterer
- (India) Ramkumar Ramanathan
- (Sweden) Elias Ymer

=== Withdrawals ===
Before the tournament

- (United States) Jenson Brooksby → replaced by (Spain) Pablo Andújar

== Doubles main draw entrants ==
=== Seeds ===
Country	Player	Country	Player	Rank^{†}	Seed
USA	Rajeev Ram	GBR	Joe Salisbury	7	1
USA	Nathaniel Lammons	USA	Jackson Withrow	95	2
FRA	Sadio Doumbia	FRA	Fabien Reboul	112	3
BEL	Sander Gillé	BEL	Joran Vliegen	121	4

† Rankings are as of 26 December 2022

=== Other entrants ===
The following pairs received wildcard entry into the main draw:

- (India) Arjun Kadhe / (Brazil) Fernando Romboli
- (India) Purav Raja / (India) Divij Sharan

The following pair received entry as alternates:

- (India) Sriram Balaji / (India) Jeevan Nedunchezhiyan

=== Withdrawals ===
- (Serbia) Laslo Đere / (Slovakia) Alex Molčan → replaced by (India) Sriram Balaji / (India) Jeevan Nedunchezhiyan

== Broadcasting ==
Sport 18 HD and Jio Cinema app aired this edition live in India.
