= 2012 Aircel Chennai Open – Doubles =

Doubles
- 2012 Aircel Chennai Open

Final
- Champions: (India) Leander Paes (Serbia) Janko Tipsarević
- Runners-up: (Israel) Jonathan Erlich (Israel) Andy Ram
- Score: 6–4, 6–4

Details
- Draw: 16
- Seeds: 4

Events
Singles	Doubles
← 2011 ·	Aircel Chennai Open	· 2013 →

Mahesh Bhupathi and Leander Paes were the defending champions but decided not to participate together.
Bhupathi played alongside Rohan Bopanna but were eliminated in the semifinals, while Paes partners up with Janko Tipsarević to win the tournament against Jonathan Erlich and Andy Ram 6–4, 6–4.

== Seeds ==
1. (India) Mahesh Bhupathi / (India) Rohan Bopanna (semifinals)
2. (United States) Scott Lipsky / (United States) Rajeev Ram (semifinals)
3. (India) Leander Paes / (Serbia) Janko Tipsarević (champions)
4. (Israel) Jonathan Erlich / (Israel) Andy Ram (final)

== Draw ==
=== Key ===
- Q = Qualifier
- WC = Wild card
- LL = Lucky loser
- Alt = Alternate
- SE = Special exempt
- PR = Protected ranking
- ITF = ITF entry
- JE = Junior exempt
- w/o = Walkover
- r = Retired
- d = Defaulted
- SR = Special ranking

=== Draw ===
First round
1	(India) M Bhupathi (India) R Bopanna	5	6	[10]
(Belgium) X Malisse (United Kingdom) K Skupski	7	3	[5]
(Germany) P Marx (Canada) A Shamasdin	1	5
(Germany) A Beck (Switzerland) S Wawrinka	6	7
4	(Israel) J Erlich (Israel) A Ram	6	6
WC	(India) MM Jayaprakash (India) R Ramanathan	2	1
(Spain) N Almagro (Spain) P Riba	6^{4}	6	[10]
(Austria) J Knowle (Germany) M Kohlmann	7^{7}	4	[4]
(Italy) F Fognini (Slovakia) I Zelenay	6	7
(Sweden) J Brunström (Croatia) I Dodig	4	5
Alt	(Canada) V Pospisil (Canada) M Raonic	3	6	[7]
3	(India) L Paes (Serbia) J Tipsarević	6	4	[10]
(Colombia) JS Cabal (Colombia) R Farah	6	6
(Russia) A Kudryavtsev (Belgium) O Rochus	4	4
WC	(India) S Balaji (India) J Nedunchezhiyan	5	4
2	(United States) S Lipsky (United States) R Ram	7	6

Quarterfinals
1	(India) M Bhupathi (India) R Bopanna	6	7^{7}
(Germany) A Beck (Switzerland) S Wawrinka	4	6^{3}
4	(Israel) J Erlich (Israel) A Ram	6	6
(Spain) N Almagro (Spain) P Riba	3	3
(Italy) F Fognini (Slovakia) I Zelenay	3	4
3	(India) L Paes (Serbia) J Tipsarević	6	6
(Colombia) JS Cabal (Colombia) R Farah	3	6	[7]
2	(United States) S Lipsky (United States) R Ram	6	4	[10]

Semifinals
1	(India) M Bhupathi (India) R Bopanna	6	3	[8]
4	(Israel) J Erlich (Israel) A Ram	4	6	[10]
3	(India) L Paes (Serbia) J Tipsarević	6	6^{1}	[10]
2	(United States) S Lipsky (United States) R Ram	2	7^{7}	[7]

Final
4	(Israel) J Erlich (Israel) A Ram	4	4
3	(India) L Paes (Serbia) J Tipsarević	6	6
