= 2013 Aircel Chennai Open =

- Date: 31 December – 6 January
- Edition: 18th
- Category: World Tour 250
- Draw: 28S / 16D
- Prize money: $385,150
- Surface: Hard / outdoor
- Location: Chennai, India
- Venue: SDAT Tennis Stadium

Champions

Singles
- (Serbia) Janko Tipsarević

Doubles
- (France) Benoît Paire / (Switzerland) Stanislas Wawrinka
- Maharashtra Open

The 2013 Aircel Chennai Open was a men's tennis tournament, played on outdoor hard courts that was part of the ATP World Tour 250 series of the 2013 ATP World Tour. It was the 18th edition of the only ATP tournament taking place in India and was played at the SDAT Tennis Stadium in Chennai. It was held from 31 December 2012 until 6 January 2013. Second-seeded Janko Tipsarević won the singles title.

== Finals ==
=== Singles ===
(Serbia) Janko Tipsarević defeated (Spain) Roberto Bautista Agut, 3–6, 6–1, 6–3

- It was Tipsarevic's only singles title of the year and the 4th and last of his career.

=== Doubles ===
(France) Benoît Paire / (Switzerland) Stanislas Wawrinka defeated (Germany) Andre Begemann / (Germany) Martin Emmrich, 6–2, 6–1

== Singles main-draw entrants ==
=== Seeds ===
Country	Player	Rank	Seed
CZE	Tomáš Berdych	6	1
SRB	Janko Tipsarević	9	2
CRO	Marin Čilić	15	3
SUI	Stanislas Wawrinka	17	4
FRA	Benoît Paire	47	5
NED	Robin Haase	56	6
TPE	Lu Yen-hsun	59	7
JPN	Go Soeda	60	8

- ^{1} Rankings as of 24 December 2012

=== Other entrants ===
The following players received wildcards into the singles main draw:

- (Czech Republic) Tomáš Berdych
- (India) Yuki Bhambri
- (India) Somdev Devvarman

The following players received entry from the qualifying draw:

- (India) Prakash Amritraj
- (Belgium) Ruben Bemelmans
- (United States) Rajeev Ram
- (Germany) Cedrik-Marcel Stebe

== Doubles main-draw entrants ==
=== Seeds ===
Country	Player	Country	Player	Rank^{1}	Seed
IND	Mahesh Bhupathi	CAN	Daniel Nestor	16	1
IND	Leander Paes	FRA	Édouard Roger-Vasselin	46	2
IND	Rohan Bopanna	USA	Rajeev Ram	56	3
GBR	Jamie Delgado	GBR	Ken Skupski	112	4

- ^{1} Rankings as of 24 December 2012

=== Other entrants ===
The following pairs received wildcards into the doubles main draw:

- (India) Sriram Balaji / (India) Jeevan Nedunchezhian
- (India) Sanam Singh / (India) Vishnu Vardhan

The following pair received entry as alternates:

- (India) Somdev Devvarman / (Ukraine) Sergiy Stakhovsky

=== Withdrawals ===
Before the tournament

- (Germany) Philipp Petzschner (knee injury)
