= 2013 Aircel Chennai Open – Doubles =

Doubles
- 2013 Aircel Chennai Open

Final
- Champions: (France) Benoît Paire (Switzerland) Stanislas Wawrinka
- Runners-up: (Germany) Andre Begemann (Germany) Martin Emmrich
- Score: 6–2, 6–1

Details
- Draw: 16
- Seeds: 4

Events
Singles	Doubles
← 2012 ·	Aircel Chennai Open	· 2014 →

The 2013 Aircel Chennai Open – Doubles was a 2013 ATP World Tour doubles tennis tournament, played on outdoor hard courts.

Leander Paes and Janko Tipsarević were the defending champions but Tipsarević decided not to participate.
Paes played alongside Édouard Roger-Vasselin, but they lost in the first round.

Benoît Paire and Stanislas Wawrinka defeated Andre Begemann and Martin Emmrich 6–2, 6–1 in the final to win the title.

== Seeds ==
1. (India) Mahesh Bhupathi / (Canada) Daniel Nestor (quarterfinals)
2. (India) Leander Paes / (France) Édouard Roger-Vasselin (first round)
3. (India) Rohan Bopanna / (United States) Rajeev Ram (quarterfinals)
4. (United Kingdom) Jamie Delgado / (United Kingdom) Ken Skupski (first round)

== Draw ==
=== Key ===
- Q = Qualifier
- WC = Wild card
- LL = Lucky loser
- Alt = Alternate
- SE = Special exempt
- PR = Protected ranking
- ITF = ITF entry
- JE = Junior exempt
- w/o = Walkover
- r = Retired
- d = Defaulted
- SR = Special ranking

=== Draw ===
First round
1	(India) M Bhupathi (Canada) D Nestor	6	6
WC	(India) S Balaji (India) J Nedunchezhiyan	3	0
(Spain) R Bautista Agut (Italy) F Cipolla	3	1
(South Africa) R Klaasen (United States) N Monroe	6	6
3	(India) R Bopanna (United States) R Ram	6	6
(Chinese Taipei) Y-h Lu (Japan) G Soeda	4	3
WC	(India) S Singh (India) V Vardhan	2	7	[7]
(France) B Paire (Switzerland) S Wawrinka	6	5	[10]
(Slovenia) A Bedene (Slovenia) B Kavčič	6	6
(Russia) E Donskoy (Russia) A Kuznetsov	4	4
(Germany) A Begemann (Germany) M Emmrich	7^{7}	6
4	(United Kingdom) J Delgado (United Kingdom) K Skupski	6^{3}	2
Alt	(India) S Devvarman (Ukraine) S Stakhovsky	7	6
(Netherlands) R Haase (Netherlands) I Sijsling	5	3
(Thailand) Sa Ratiwatana (Thailand) So Ratiwatana	7^{9}	6
2	(India) L Paes (France) É Roger-Vasselin	6^{7}	1

Quarterfinals
1	(India) M Bhupathi (Canada) D Nestor	4	5
(South Africa) R Klaasen (United States) N Monroe	6	7
3	(India) R Bopanna (United States) R Ram	6	4	[1]
(France) B Paire (Switzerland) S Wawrinka	0	6	[10]
(Slovenia) A Bedene (Slovenia) B Kavčič	6^{1}	1
(Germany) A Begemann (Germany) M Emmrich	7^{7}	6
Alt	(India) S Devvarman (Ukraine) S Stakhovsky	3	5
(Thailand) Sa Ratiwatana (Thailand) So Ratiwatana	6	7

Semifinals
(South Africa) R Klaasen (United States) N Monroe	7^{11}	4	[8]
(France) B Paire (Switzerland) S Wawrinka	6^{9}	6	[10]
(Germany) A Begemann (Germany) M Emmrich	7^{7}	6
(Thailand) Sa Ratiwatana (Thailand) So Ratiwatana	6^{3}	4

Final
(France) B Paire (Switzerland) S Wawrinka	6	6
(Germany) A Begemann (Germany) M Emmrich	2	1
