= Clash of Continents Exhibition =

2012 tennis exhibition tournament in Singapore

The 2012 Clash of Continents Exhibition was a men's and women's tennis exhibition tournament, held 24–25 November 2012 in Singapore. The previous event had been a women's only event, called the Singapore Women's Tennis Exhibition. The men's event was a round robin, with the women's event pitting two players against each other.

== Players ==
=== Men ===
Seed	Country	Continent	Player	Rank
1	SRB	Europe	Janko Tipsarević	9
2	ARG	South America	Juan Mónaco	12
3	JPN	Asia	Kei Nishikori	19
4	USA	North America	Sam Querrey	22

=== Women ===
Seed	Country	Continent	Player	Rank
1	SVK	Europe	Daniela Hantuchová	32
2	CHN	Asia	Peng Shuai	40
