= 2022 Tata Open Maharashtra – Singles =

Singles
- 2022 Tata Open Maharashtra

Final
- Champion: (Portugal) João Sousa
- Runner-up: (Finland) Emil Ruusuvuori
- Score: 7–6^{(11–9)}, 4–6, 6–1

Details
- Draw: 28 (3Q, 4WC)
- Seeds: 8

Events
Singles	Doubles
← 2020 ·	Maharashtra Open	· 2023 →

João Sousa defeated Emil Ruusuvuori in the final, 7–6^{(11–9)}, 4–6, 6–1 to win the singles title at the 2022 Tata Open Maharashtra. Sousa saved three match points against Elias Ymer in the semifinals. This was his first title since 2018.

Jiří Veselý was the defending champion from when the tournament was last held in 2020, but lost in the quarterfinals to Ruusuvuori.

== Seeds ==
The top four seeds received a bye into the second round.

1. (Russia) Aslan Karatsev (second round)
2. (Italy) Lorenzo Musetti (quarterfinals)
3. (Italy) Gianluca Mager (second round)
4. (Czech Republic) Jiří Veselý (quarterfinals)
5. (Germany) Daniel Altmaier (quarterfinals)
6. (Finland) Emil Ruusuvuori (final)
7. (Lithuania) Ričardas Berankis (first round)
8. (Italy) Stefano Travaglia (quarterfinals)

== Draw ==
=== Key ===
- Q = Qualifier
- WC = Wild card
- LL = Lucky loser
- Alt = Alternate
- SE = Special exempt
- PR = Protected ranking
- ITF = ITF entry
- JE = Junior exempt
- w/o = Walkover
- r = Retired
- d = Defaulted
- SR = Special ranking

=== Finals ===
Semifinals
Q	(Sweden) Elias Ymer	7	6^{4}	5
(Portugal) João Sousa	5	7^{7}	7
6	(Finland) Emil Ruusuvuori	6	7^{7}
(Poland) Kamil Majchrzak	3	6^{0}

Final
(Portugal) João Sousa	7^{11}	4	6
6	(Finland) Emil Ruusuvuori	6^{9}	6	1

=== Top half ===
First round
Q	(Sweden) E Ymer	7	3	6
Q	(Italy) GM Moroni	5	6	4
(Slovakia) J Kovalík	7^{12}	2	5
PR	(India) Y Bhambri	6^{10}	6	7
WC	(India) R Ramanathan	6^{7}	6	3
8	(Italy) S Travaglia	7^{9}	4	6
WC	(India) A Kadhe	7^{7}	6^{4}	2
(Portugal) J Sousa	6^{5}	7^{7}	6
(Italy) F Gaio	2	6^{3}
(Moldova) R Albot	6	7^{7}
WC	(India) P Gunneswaran	6^{5}	2
5	(Germany) D Altmaier	7^{7}	6

Second round
1	(Russia) A Karatsev	2	6^{3}
Q	(Sweden) E Ymer	6	7^{7}
PR	(India) Y Bhambri	3	2
8	(Italy) S Travaglia	6	6
3	(Italy) G Mager	6	3	6^{4}
(Portugal) J Sousa	4	6	7^{7}
(Moldova) R Albot	6	4	4
5	(Germany) D Altmaier	3	6	6

Quarterfinals
Q	(Sweden) E Ymer	6	7^{7}
8	(Italy) S Travaglia	4	6^{4}
(Portugal) J Sousa	6	6
5	(Germany) D Altmaier	2	3

Semifinals
Q	(Sweden) E Ymer	7	6^{4}	5
(Portugal) J Sousa	5	7^{7}	7

=== Bottom half ===
First round
6	(Finland) E Ruusuvuori	6	7^{13}
(Belarus) E Gerasimov	0	6^{11}
Q	(Czech Republic) V Kopřiva	6	6
(Turkey) C İlkel	4	2
(Austria) D Novak	4	1
(Spain) B Zapata Miralles	6	6
7	(Lithuania) R Berankis	1	2
(France) Q Halys	6	6
(Poland) K Majchrzak	6	7
Q	(United Kingdom) J Clarke	3	5
(France) H Grenier	6	2	6^{4}
(Australia) A Vukic	2	6	7^{7}

Second round
6	(Finland) E Ruusuvuori	6	6
Q	(Czech Republic) V Kopřiva	3	3
(Spain) B Zapata Miralles	3	4
4	(Czech Republic) J Veselý	6	6
(France) Q Halys	3	6^{7}
(Poland) K Majchrzak	6	7^{9}
(Australia) A Vukic	6^{3}	6	3
2	(Italy) L Musetti	7^{7}	3	6

Quarterfinals
6	(Finland) E Ruusuvuori	6	6
4	(Czech Republic) J Veselý	3	4
(Poland) K Majchrzak	6	6^{5}	6
2	(Italy) L Musetti	2	7^{7}	4

Semifinals
6	(Finland) E Ruusuvuori	6	7^{7}
(Poland) K Majchrzak	3	6^{0}

== Qualifying ==
=== Seeds ===
1. (Turkey) Altuğ Çelikbilek (qualifying competition)
2. (France) Enzo Couacaud (first round)
3. (Sweden) Elias Ymer (qualified)
4. (Germany) Daniel Masur (withdrew)
5. (United Kingdom) Jay Clarke (qualified)
6. (Russia) Evgeny Donskoy (first round)
7. (Chinese Taipei) Tseng Chun-hsin (first round)
8. (Czech Republic) Vít Kopřiva (qualified)

=== Qualifiers ===
1. (Czech Republic) Vít Kopřiva
2. (United Kingdom) Jay Clarke
3. (Sweden) Elias Ymer
4. (Italy) Gian Marco Moroni

=== Qualifying draw ===
==== First qualifier ====
First round
1	(Turkey) Altuğ Çelikbilek	6	6
WC	(India) Mukund Sasikumar	3	3
WC	(India) Manish Sureshkumar	2	3
8	(Czech Republic) Vít Kopřiva	6	6

Qualifying competition
1	(Turkey) Altuğ Çelikbilek	7^{7}	3	5
8	(Czech Republic) Vít Kopřiva	6^{4}	6	7

==== Second qualifier ====
First round
2	(France) Enzo Couacaud	6	6^{5}	6^{2}
Alt	(France) Alexandre Müller	4	7^{7}	7^{7}
Alt	(Australia) Andrew Harris	1	3
5	(United Kingdom) Jay Clarke	6	6

Qualifying competition
Alt	(France) Alexandre Müller	7^{7}	3	4
5	(United Kingdom) Jay Clarke	6^{5}	6	6

==== Third qualifier ====
First round
3	(Sweden) Elias Ymer	7	6
(Bulgaria) Dimitar Kuzmanov	5	4
(Australia) Marc Polmans	6	6
7	(Chinese Taipei) Tseng Chun-hsin	3	4

Qualifying competition
3	(Sweden) Elias Ymer	6	6
(Australia) Marc Polmans	4	4

==== Fourth qualifier ====
First round
Alt	(Croatia) Borna Gojo	6	1	6^{7}
(Belgium) Kimmer Coppejans	3	6	7^{9}
(Italy) Gian Marco Moroni	7	5	6
6	(Russia) Evgeny Donskoy	5	7	1

Qualifying competition
(Belgium) Kimmer Coppejans	6^{5}	4
(Italy) Gian Marco Moroni	7^{7}	6
