= 2012 Aircel Chennai Open – Singles =

Singles
- 2012 Aircel Chennai Open

Final
- Champion: (Canada) Milos Raonic
- Runner-up: (Serbia) Janko Tipsarević
- Score: 6–7^{(4–7)}, 7–6^{(7–4)}, 7–6^{(7–4)}

Details
- Draw: 28 (4 Q / 3 WC )
- Seeds: 8

Events
Singles	Doubles
← 2011 ·	Aircel Chennai Open	· 2013 →

Stanislas Wawrinka was the defending champion, but lost in the quarterfinals to Japanese qualifier Go Soeda.

Milos Raonic won the tournament beating top seeded Janko Tipsarević, 6–7^{(4–7)}, 7–6^{(7–4)}, 7–6^{(7–4)}.

== Seeds ==
The top four seeds received a bye into the second round.

1. (Serbia) Janko Tipsarević (final)
2. (Spain) Nicolás Almagro (semifinals)
3. (Switzerland) Stanislas Wawrinka (quarterfinals)
4. (Canada) Milos Raonic (champion)
5. (Croatia) Ivan Dodig (second round)
6. (Italy) Fabio Fognini (first round)
7. (Belgium) Xavier Malisse (first round)
8. (Belgium) Olivier Rochus (first round)

== Draw ==
=== Key ===
- Q = Qualifier
- WC = Wild card
- LL = Lucky loser
- Alt = Alternate
- SE = Special exempt
- PR = Protected ranking
- ITF = ITF entry
- JE = Junior exempt
- w/o = Walkover
- r = Retired
- d = Defaulted
- SR = Special ranking

=== Finals ===
Semifinals
1	(Serbia) Janko Tipsarević	6	6
Q	(Japan) Go Soeda	1	4
4	(Canada) Milos Raonic	6	6
2	(Spain) Nicolás Almagro	4	4

Final
1	(Serbia) Janko Tipsarević	7^{7}	6^{4}	6^{4}
4	(Canada) Milos Raonic	6^{4}	7^{7}	7^{7}

=== Top half ===
First round
WC	(India) Y Bhambri	6	6
(Slovakia) K Beck	2	3
(Germany) A Beck	6	7^{10}
Q	(Canada) V Pospisil	3	6^{8}
WC	(Belgium) D Goffin	4	6	6
7	(Belgium) X Malisse	6	2	3
(France) É Prodon	4	3
LL	(France) É Roger-Vasselin	6	6
(Portugal) F Gil	2	7^{7}	5
Q	(Japan) G Soeda	6	6^{4}	7
WC	(India) V Vardhan	6	6^{8}	1
5	(Croatia) I Dodig	4	7^{10}	6

Second round
1	(Serbia) J Tipsarević	6	6
WC	(India) Y Bhambri	1	3
(Germany) A Beck	6	4	2
WC	(Belgium) D Goffin	4	6	6
3	(Switzerland) S Wawrinka	3	6	7
LL	(France) É Roger-Vasselin	6	3	5
Q	(Japan) G Soeda	7^{8}	6
5	(Croatia) I Dodig	6^{6}	3

Quarterfinals
1	(Serbia) J Tipsarević	6	3	6
WC	(Belgium) D Goffin	2	6	2
3	(Switzerland) S Wawrinka	4	4
Q	(Japan) G Soeda	6	6

Semifinals
1	(Serbia) J Tipsarević	6	6
Q	(Japan) G Soeda	1	4

=== Bottom half ===
First round
6	(Italy) F Fognini	0	1
(Israel) D Sela	6	6
(Spain) P Riba	2	1
(France) B Paire	6	6
(United States) S Querrey	3	4
(Romania) V Hănescu	6	6
8	(Belgium) O Rochus	3	4
Q	(Japan) Y Sugita	6	6
Q	(Netherlands) T de Bakker	3	3
(Chinese Taipei) Y-h Lu	6	6
(Slovenia) B Kavčič	6	5	3
(Belgium) S Darcis	4	7	6

Second round
(Israel) D Sela	4	6	6
(France) B Paire	6	2	4
(Romania) V Hănescu	1	4
4	(Canada) M Raonic	6	6
Q	(Japan) Y Sugita	7^{7}	6
(Chinese Taipei) Y-h Lu	6^{5}	4
(Belgium) S Darcis
2	(Spain) N Almagro	w/o

Quarterfinals
(Israel) D Sela	6^{4}	3
4	(Canada) M Raonic	7^{7}	6
Q	(Japan) Y Sugita	6	6^{8}	4
2	(Spain) N Almagro	4	7^{10}	6

Semifinals
4	(Canada) M Raonic	6	6
2	(Spain) N Almagro	4	4

== Qualifying ==
=== Seeds ===
1. (France) Stéphane Robert (first round)
2. (France) Édouard Roger-Vasselin (Qualifying competition, lucky loser)
3. (South Africa) Izak van der Merwe (qualifying competition)
4. (Canada) Vasek Pospisil (qualified)
5. (Japan) Go Soeda (qualified)
6. (South Africa) Rik de Voest (qualifying competition)
7. (Spain) Arnau Brugués Davi (first round)
8. (United States) Rajeev Ram (qualifying competition)

=== Qualifiers ===
1. (Japan) Yūichi Sugita
2. (Japan) Go Soeda
3. (Netherlands) Thiemo de Bakker
4. (Canada) Vasek Pospisil

=== Lucky losers ===
1. (France) Édouard Roger-Vasselin

=== Draw ===
==== First qualifier ====
First round
1	(France) Stéphane Robert	6	2	6^{8}
(Portugal) João Sousa	4	6	7^{10}
(Chinese Taipei) Jimmy Wang	4	6	3
(Japan) Yūichi Sugita	6	3	6
WC	(India) Akash Wagh	2	4
(Philippines) Treat Conrad Huey	6	6
WC	(India) Abhijeet Tiwari	0	4
6	(South Africa) Rik de Voest	6	6

Second round
(Portugal) João Sousa	4	1
(Japan) Yūichi Sugita	6	6
(Philippines) Treat Conrad Huey	3	4
6	(South Africa) Rik de Voest	6	6

Qualifying competition
(Japan) Yūichi Sugita	7^{7}	6
6	(South Africa) Rik de Voest	6^{0}	1

==== Second qualifier ====
First round
2	(France) Édouard Roger-Vasselin	6	3	4
(Russia) Alexander Kudryavtsev	3	6	2^{r}
(Serbia) Dušan Lajović	4	6	6
(India) Sanam Singh	6	4	3
(India) Vijay Sundar Prashanth	3	0^{r}
(India) Rohan Bopanna	6	0
(India) Vignesh Peranamallur	1	3
5	(Japan) Go Soeda	6	6

Second round
2	(France) Édouard Roger-Vasselin	7^{7}	6
(Serbia) Dušan Lajović	6^{1}	2
(India) Rohan Bopanna	6^{2}	6^{2}
5	(Japan) Go Soeda	7^{7}	7^{7}

Qualifying competition
2	(France) Édouard Roger-Vasselin	4	6^{5}
5	(Japan) Go Soeda	6	7^{7}

==== Third qualifier ====
First round
3	(South Africa) Izak van der Merwe	2	7	6
(United Kingdom) Jamie Baker	6	5	4
(Spain) Íñigo Cervantes Huegun	6	7
(India) Ranjeet Virali-Murugesan	1	5
WC	(India) Neeraj Elangovan	0	0
(Colombia) Juan Sebastián Cabal	6	6
(Netherlands) Thiemo de Bakker	7	7^{7}
7	(Spain) Arnau Brugués Davi	5	6^{5}

Second round
3	(South Africa) Izak van der Merwe	6	7
(Spain) Íñigo Cervantes Huegun	4	5
(Colombia) Juan Sebastián Cabal	1	3
(Netherlands) Thiemo de Bakker	6	6

Qualifying competition
3	(South Africa) Izak van der Merwe	2	4
(Netherlands) Thiemo de Bakker	6	6

==== Fourth qualifier ====
First round
4	(Canada) Vasek Pospisil	7^{8}	7^{9}
(India) Jeevan Nedunchezhiyan	6^{6}	6^{7}
(India) Mohit Jayaprakash	6	6
(India) Ramkumar Ramanathan	2	2
(India) Karan Rastogi	1	3
WC	(India) Prajnesh Gunneswaran	6	6
(India) N. Sriram Balaji	5	4
8	(United States) Rajeev Ram	7	6

Second round
4	(Canada) Vasek Pospisil	6	6
(India) Mohit Jayaprakash	3	2
WC	(India) Prajnesh Gunneswaran	3	6^{3}
8	(United States) Rajeev Ram	6	7^{7}

Qualifying competition
4	(Canada) Vasek Pospisil	6	6^{2}	6
8	(United States) Rajeev Ram	1	7^{7}	3
