= 2013 Aircel Chennai Open – Singles =

Singles
- 2013 Aircel Chennai Open

Final
- Champion: (Serbia) Janko Tipsarević
- Runner-up: (Spain) Roberto Bautista Agut
- Score: 3–6, 6–1, 6–3

Details
- Draw: 28 (4 Q / 3 WC )
- Seeds: 8

Events
Singles	Doubles
← 2012 ·	Aircel Chennai Open	· 2014 →

Milos Raonic was the defending champion, but chose to compete in Brisbane instead.
Janko Tipsarević won the title, defeating Roberto Bautista Agut 3–6, 6–1, 6–3 in the final.

== Seeds ==
The top four seeds received a bye into the second round.

1. (Czech Republic) Tomáš Berdych (quarterfinals)
2. (Serbia) Janko Tipsarević (champion)
3. (Croatia) Marin Čilić (quarterfinals)
4. (Switzerland) Stanislas Wawrinka (quarterfinals)
5. (France) Benoît Paire (semifinals)
6. (Netherlands) Robin Haase (second round)
7. (Chinese Taipei) Lu Yen-hsun (first round)
8. (Japan) Go Soeda (quarterfinals)

== Draw ==
=== Finals ===
Semifinals
(Spain) Roberto Bautista Agut	3	6	6
5	(France) Benoît Paire	6	1	4
(Slovenia) Aljaž Bedene	6	2	2
2	(Serbia) Janko Tipsarević	4	6	6

Final
(Spain) Roberto Bautista Agut	6	1	3
2	(Serbia) Janko Tipsarević	3	6	6

=== Top half ===
First round
(Czech Republic) J Hájek	3	3
WC	(India) S Devvarman	6	6
(Slovenia) B Kavčič	6^{6}	2
(Spain) R Bautista Agut	7^{8}	6
(Germany) M Bachinger	6	3	6
7	(Chinese Taipei) Y-h Lu	4	6	4
Q	(Belgium) R Bemelmans	6^{7}	6^{5}
(Ukraine) S Stakhovsky	7^{9}	7^{7}
(Israel) D Sela	6	6
Q	(United States) R Ram	4	1
(Italy) F Cipolla	3	3
5	(France) B Paire	6	6

Second round
1/WC	(Czech Republic) T Berdych	6	6
WC	(India) S Devvarman	3	1
(Spain) R Bautista Agut	7^{7}	6
(Germany) M Bachinger	6^{4}	3
3	(Croatia) M Čilić	4	6	6
(Ukraine) S Stakhovsky	6	2	3
(Israel) D Sela	1	0
5	(France) B Paire	6	6

Quarterfinals
1/WC	(Czech Republic) T Berdych	5	6	3
(Spain) R Bautista Agut	7	2	6
3	(Croatia) M Čilić	4	6	5
5	(France) B Paire	6	1	7

Semifinals
(Spain) R Bautista Agut	3	6	6
5	(France) B Paire	6	1	4

=== Bottom half ===
First round
6	(Netherlands) R Haase	7	6
WC	(India) Y Bhambri	5	3
(Slovenia) A Bedene	6	6
(Portugal) J Sousa	3	2
(Netherlands) I Sijsling	4	4
Q	(Germany) C-M Stebe	6	6
8	(Japan) G Soeda	6	6
(Russia) E Donskoy	1	2
Q	(India) P Amritraj	6^{4}	6	6
(France) G Rufin	7^{7}	2	3
(France) É Roger-Vasselin	6	6
(Russia) A Kuznetsov	3	4

Second round
6	(Netherlands) R Haase	5	3
(Slovenia) A Bedene	7	6
Q	(Germany) C-M Stebe	4	3
4	(Switzerland) S Wawrinka	6	6
8	(Japan) G Soeda	7^{7}	3	6
Q	(India) P Amritraj	6^{2}	6	4
(France) É Roger-Vasselin	2	3
2	(Serbia) J Tipsarević	6	6

Quarterfinals
(Slovenia) A Bedene	6	7^{8}
4	(Switzerland) S Wawrinka	2	6^{6}
8	(Japan) G Soeda	2	4
2	(Serbia) J Tipsarević	6	6

Semifinals
(Slovenia) A Bedene	6	2	2
2	(Serbia) J Tipsarević	4	6	6

== Qualifying ==
=== Seeds ===
1. (Belgium) Ruben Bemelmans (qualified)
2. (Germany) Philipp Petzschner (second round, retired because of a knee injury)
3. (Japan) Yūichi Sugita (first round)
4. (France) Kenny de Schepper (qualifying competition)
5. (United States) Rajeev Ram (qualified)
6. (Germany) Cedrik-Marcel Stebe (qualified)
7. (United Kingdom) James Ward (qualifying competition)
8. (Chinese Taipei) Yang Tsung-hua (first round)

=== Qualifiers ===
1. (Belgium) Ruben Bemelmans
2. (Germany) Cedrik-Marcel Stebe
3. (India) Prakash Amritraj
4. (United States) Rajeev Ram

=== Draw ===
==== First qualifier ====
First round
1	(Belgium) Ruben Bemelmans	6	6
WC	(India) Ajai Selvaraj	1	0
(India) Sanam Singh	7^{7}	4	3
(India) Vishnu Vardhan	6^{3}	6	6
(India) Sidharth Rawat	6	6
WC	(India) Vignesh Peranamallur	3	3
(Serbia) Filip Krajinović	6	7^{7}
8	(Chinese Taipei) Yang Tsung-hua	3	6^{3}

Second round
1	(Belgium) Ruben Bemelmans	6	4	6
(India) Vishnu Vardhan	4	6	1
(India) Sidharth Rawat	3	2
(Serbia) Filip Krajinović	6	6

Qualifying competition
1	(Belgium) Ruben Bemelmans	6	6
(Serbia) Filip Krajinović	4	2

==== Second qualifier ====
First round
2	(Germany) Philipp Petzschner	6	7^{7}
(Germany) Martin Emmrich	2	6^{4}
(Russia) Alexander Kudryavtsev	6^{3}	6	1
(Germany) Andre Begemann	7^{7}	3	6
(India) Vijayant Malik	4	6	7
(India) Vijay Sundar Prashanth	6	3	5
(Bosnia and Herzegovina) Mirza Bašić	6	4	4
6	(Germany) Cedrik-Marcel Stebe	4	6	6

Second round
2	(Germany) Philipp Petzschner	6	4	2^{r}
(Germany) Andre Begemann	3	6	4
(India) Vijayant Malik	6	4	5
6	(Germany) Cedrik-Marcel Stebe	2	6	7

Qualifying competition
(Germany) Andre Begemann	4	5
6	(Germany) Cedrik-Marcel Stebe	6	7

==== Third qualifier ====
First round
3	(Japan) Yūichi Sugita	4	6	3
(India) Prakash Amritraj	6	3	6
(Greece) Theodoros Angelinos	6	6
WC	(India) Neeraj Elangovan	2	0
(India) Mohit Mayur Jayaprakash	3	4
(India) Saketh Myneni	6	6
(France) Pierre-Hugues Herbert	5	4
7	(United Kingdom) James Ward	7	6

Second round
(India) Prakash Amritraj	6	6
(Greece) Theodoros Angelinos	4	4
(India) Saketh Myneni	6	3	4
7	(United Kingdom) James Ward	3	6	6

Qualifying competition
(India) Prakash Amritraj	5	6	6
7	(United Kingdom) James Ward	7	4	4

==== Fourth qualifier ====
First round
4	(France) Kenny de Schepper	6	6
(India) Arjun Kadhe	1	2
(India) Sriram Balaji	6	6
WC	(India) Elwin Antony	3	4
(India) Divij Sharan	7	6
(India) Ashwin Vijayragavan	5	3
(India) Ramkumar Ramanathan	4	1
5	(United States) Rajeev Ram	6	6

Second round
4	(France) Kenny de Schepper	6	3	6
(India) Sriram Balaji	4	6	1
(India) Divij Sharan	0	6	1
5	(United States) Rajeev Ram	6	3	6

Qualifying competition
4	(France) Kenny de Schepper	6^{7}	6	1
5	(United States) Rajeev Ram	7^{9}	4	6
