= 2023 Tata Open Maharashtra – Doubles =

Doubles
- 2023 Tata Open Maharashtra

Final
- Champions: (Belgium) Sander Gillé (Belgium) Joran Vliegen
- Runners-up: (India) Sriram Balaji (India) Jeevan Nedunchezhiyan
- Score: 6–4, 6–4

Details
- Draw: 16
- Seeds: 4

Events
Singles	Doubles
← 2022 ·	Maharashtra Open	· 2024 →

Sander Gillé and Joran Vliegen defeated Sriram Balaji and Jeevan Nedunchezhiyan in the final, 6–4, 6–4 to win the doubles tennis title at the 2023 Maharashtra Open. It was their sixth ATP Tour title as a team.

Rohan Bopanna and Ramkumar Ramanathan were the defending champions, but chose not to compete together. Bopanna partnered Botic van de Zandschulp, but lost in the first round to Ramanathan and Miguel Ángel Reyes-Varela. Ramanathan and Reyes-Varela lost in the quarterfinals to Rajeev Ram and Joe Salisbury.

== Seeds ==
1. (United States) Rajeev Ram / (United Kingdom) Joe Salisbury (semifinals)
2. (United States) Nathaniel Lammons / (United States) Jackson Withrow (quarterfinals)
3. (France) Sadio Doumbia / (France) Fabien Reboul (quarterfinals)
4. (Belgium) Sander Gillé / (Belgium) Joran Vliegen (champions)

== Draw ==
=== Key ===
- Q = Qualifier
- WC = Wild card
- LL = Lucky loser
- Alt = Alternate
- SE = Special exempt
- PR = Protected ranking
- ITF = ITF entry
- JE = Junior exempt
- w/o = Walkover
- r = Retired
- d = Defaulted
- SR = Special ranking

=== Draw ===
First round
1	(United States) R Ram (United Kingdom) J Salisbury	6	7^{7}
(Argentina) S Báez (Venezuela) LD Martínez	3	6^{1}
(India) R Bopanna (Netherlands) B van de Zandschulp	6^{5}	7^{7}	[9]
(India) R Ramanathan (Mexico) MÁ Reyes-Varela	7^{7}	6^{4}	[11]
4	(Belgium) S Gillé (Belgium) J Vliegen	6	6
(Serbia) I Sabanov (Serbia) M Sabanov	4	4
(Spain) R Carballés Baena (Spain) B Zapata Miralles	6^{3}	4
(Spain) P Martínez (Spain) J Munar	7^{7}	6
(United Kingdom) J Cash (United Kingdom) H Patten	7	6
(Ecuador) D Hidalgo (Finland) E Ruusuvuori	5	4
(India) Y Bhambri (India) S Myneni	7^{7}	5	[7]
3	(France) S Doumbia (France) F Reboul	6^{1}	7	[10]
Alt	(India) S Balaji (India) J Nedunchezhiyan	6	6
WC	(India) P Raja (India) D Sharan	4	3
WC	(India) A Kadhe (Brazil) F Romboli	6^{6}	2
2	(United States) N Lammons (United States) J Withrow	7^{8}	6

Quarterfinals
1	(United States) R Ram (United Kingdom) J Salisbury	6	6
(India) R Ramanathan (Mexico) MÁ Reyes-Varela	2	1
4	(Belgium) S Gillé (Belgium) J Vliegen	6	7^{7}
(Spain) P Martínez (Spain) J Munar	4	6^{3}
(United Kingdom) J Cash (United Kingdom) H Patten	6	6
3	(France) S Doumbia (France) F Reboul	2	4
Alt	(India) S Balaji (India) J Nedunchezhiyan	7^{8}	7^{7}
2	(United States) N Lammons (United States) J Withrow	6^{6}	6^{5}

Semifinals
1	(United States) R Ram (United Kingdom) J Salisbury	6^{3}	6^{4}
4	(Belgium) S Gillé (Belgium) J Vliegen	7^{7}	7^{7}
(United Kingdom) J Cash (United Kingdom) H Patten	4	5
Alt	(India) S Balaji (India) J Nedunchezhiyan	6	7

Final
4	(Belgium) S Gillé (Belgium) J Vliegen	6	6
Alt	(India) S Balaji (India) J Nedunchezhiyan	4	4
