= 2011 Singapore Women's Tennis Exhibition =

Following are the results of the 2011 Singapore Women's Tennis Exhibition, a women's exhibition tennis tournament organized at the end of each season.

Flavia Pennetta beat Agnieszka Radwańska in the final.

== Players ==
Anabel Medina Garrigues had withdrawn and tournament organisers wished to find a top 10 player to replace her, and being unable to do so, contacted Medina Garrigues and was reconfirmed. All the players, except for Pennetta, competed in an end-of-year event.

Seed	Country	Player	Rank
1	AUS	Samantha Stosur	6
2	POL	Agnieszka Radwańska	8
3	CHN	Peng Shuai	17
4	ITA	Flavia Pennetta	20
5	SVK	Daniela Hantuchová	24
6	ESP	Anabel Medina Garrigues	27

== Withdrawn players ==
Country	Player	Rank
RUS	Svetlana Kuznetsova	19

== Head to head ==
Below are the head-to-head records as they approached the tournament.

		Stosur	Radwańska	Peng	Pennetta	Hantuchová	Medina Garrigues
1	(Australia) Samantha Stosur		2-1	3-0	0-4	6-1	2-1
2	(Poland) Agnieszka Radwańska	1-2		3-1	3-1	5-2	0-0
3	(China) Peng Shuai	0-3	1-3		0-6	0-1	3-0
4	(Italy) Flavia Pennetta	4-0	1-3	6-0		3-2	4-3
5	(Slovakia) Daniela Hantuchová	1-6	2-5	1-0	2-3		3-1
6	(Spain) Anabel Medina Garrigues	1-2	0-0	0-3	3-4	1-3	

== Draw ==
Quarter-finals
1	(Australia) Samantha Stosur
Bye
(Slovakia) Daniela Hantuchová	6	6	1
4	(Italy) Flavia Pennetta	7	1	6
3	(China) Peng Shuai	6	6
(Spain) Anabel Medina Garrigues	2	3
Bye
2	(Poland) Agnieszka Radwańska

Semi-finals
1	(Australia) Samantha Stosur	5	7^{7}	2
4	(Italy) Flavia Pennetta	7	6^{3}	6
3	(China) Peng Shuai	3	1
2	(Poland) Agnieszka Radwańska	6	6

Final
4	(Italy) Flavia Pennetta	6	7
2	(Poland) Agnieszka Radwańska	4	5
Third place Match
1	(Australia) Samantha Stosur	2	6	6
3	(China) Peng Shuai	6	4	4
