= 2022 Tata Open Maharashtra =

- Date: 31 January–6 February 2022
- Edition: 26th
- Draw: 28S / 16D
- Surface: Hard / outdoor
- Location: Pune, India
- Venue: Mhalunge Balewadi Tennis Complex

Champions

Singles
- (Portugal) João Sousa

Doubles
- (India) Rohan Bopanna / (India) Ramkumar Ramanathan
- Maharashtra Open

The 2022 Tata Open Maharashtra was a 2022 ATP Tour tennis tournament happening on outdoor hard courts. It was the 26th edition of the only ATP tournament played in India and took place in Pune, India, from 31 January through 6 February 2022. It was a ATP 250 championship and South Asia's only ATP Tour event.

This edition took place without crowds due to the COVID-19 pandemic.

== Champions ==
=== Singles ===
- (Portugal) João Sousa def. (Finland) Emil Ruusuvuori, 7–6^{(11–9)}, 4–6, 6–1

This was Sousa's 4th ATP singles title.

=== Doubles ===
- (India) Rohan Bopanna / (India) Ramkumar Ramanathan def. (Australia) Luke Saville / (Australia) John-Patrick Smith, 6–7^{(10–12)}, 6–3, [10–6]

== Point and prize money ==
=== Point distribution ===
Event	W	F	SF	QF	Round of 16	Round of 32	Q	Q2	Q1
Singles	250	150	90	45	20	0	12	6	0
Doubles	250	150	90	45	0	—N/a	—N/a	—N/a	—N/a

=== Prize money ===
Event	W	F	SF	QF	Round of 16	Round of 32	Q2	Q1
Singles	$46,175	$32,320	$21,410	$14,275	$9,235	$5,035	$2,520	$1,260
Doubles*	$16,370	$11,760	$7,560	$5,030	$2,940	—N/a	—N/a	—N/a

_{*per team}

== Singles main-draw entrants ==
=== Seeds ===
Country	Player	Rank^{1}	Seed
RUS	Aslan Karatsev	15	1
ITA	Lorenzo Musetti	60	2
ITA	Gianluca Mager	65	3
CZE	Jiří Veselý	78	4
GER	Daniel Altmaier	87	5
FIN	Emil Ruusuvuori	90	6
LTU	Ričardas Berankis	93	7
ITA	Stefano Travaglia	98	8

- ^{1} Rankings are as of 17 January 2022.

=== Other entrants ===
The following players received wildcards into the singles main draw:

- (India) Prajnesh Gunneswaran
- (India) Arjun Kadhe
- (India) Ramkumar Ramanathan

The following player received entry using a protected ranking into the singles main draw:

- (India) Yuki Bhambri

The following players received entry from the qualifying draw:

- (United Kingdom) Jay Clarke
- (Czech Republic) Vít Kopřiva
- (Italy) Gian Marco Moroni
- (Sweden) Elias Ymer

=== Withdrawals ===
Before the tournament

- (Australia) James Duckworth → replaced by (France) Hugo Grenier
- (Australia) John Millman → replaced by (France) Quentin Halys

== Doubles main-draw entrants ==
=== Seeds ===
Country	Player	Country	Player	Rank^{1}	Seed
AUS	Luke Saville	AUS	John-Patrick Smith	91	1
IND	Rohan Bopanna	IND	Ramkumar Ramanathan	156	2
POL	Szymon Walków	POL	Jan Zieliński	183	3
AUS	Marc Polmans	AUS	Matt Reid	184	4

- ^{1} Rankings are as of 17 January 2022.

=== Other entrants ===
The following players received wildcards into the doubles main draw:

- (India) Yuki Bhambri / (India) Divij Sharan
- (India) Arjun Kadhe / (India) Purav Raja

=== Withdrawals ===
Before the tournament

- (Moldova) Radu Albot / (Lithuania) Ričardas Berankis → replaced by (India) Sriram Balaji / (India) Vishnu Vardhan
- (Australia) Matthew Ebden / (Australia) Max Purcell → replaced by (India) Saketh Myneni / (India) Mukund Sasikumar
- (Austria) Alexander Erler / (Austria) Lucas Miedler → replaced by (Austria) Alexander Erler / (Czech Republic) Jiří Veselý
- (Philippines) Treat Huey / (Indonesia) Christopher Rungkat → replaced by (Italy) Gianluca Mager / (Finland) Emil Ruusuvuori
- (United States) Evan King / (United States) Alex Lawson → replaced by (France) Hugo Grenier / (France) Quentin Halys
- (Serbia) Ivan Sabanov / (Serbia) Matej Sabanov → replaced by (United States) James Cerretani / (United States) Nicholas Monroe

== Television broadcast ==
Tata Open Maharashtra 2022 is live and exclusively running on Star sports select 1 channel in India and live streams on Disney Plus Hotstar app.
