= 2014 Aircel Chennai Open – Doubles =

Doubles
- 2014 Aircel Chennai Open

Final
- Champions: (Sweden) Johan Brunström (Denmark) Frederik Nielsen
- Runners-up: (Croatia) Marin Draganja (Croatia) Mate Pavić
- Score: 6–2, 4–6, [10–7]

Details
- Draw: 16
- Seeds: 4

Events
| Singles | Doubles |
| ← 2013 · | Maharashtra Open | · 2015 → |

Benoît Paire and Stanislas Wawrinka were the defending champions, but lost in the first round to top seeds Rohan Bopanna and Aisam-ul-Haq Qureshi.
Johan Brunström and Frederik Nielsen won the title, defeating Marin Draganja and Mate Pavić in the final, 6–2, 4–6, [10–7].

== Seeds ==
1. (India) Rohan Bopanna / (Pakistan) Aisam-ul-Haq Qureshi (quarterfinals)
2. (Italy) Fabio Fognini / (India) Leander Paes (first round, withdrew because of an injury for Fognini)
3. (Germany) Andre Begemann / (Germany) Martin Emmrich (semifinals)
4. (Sweden) Johan Brunström / (Denmark) Frederik Nielsen (champions)

== Draw ==
=== Key ===
- Q = Qualifier
- WC = Wild card
- LL = Lucky loser
- Alt = Alternate
- SE = Special exempt
- PR = Protected ranking
- ITF = ITF entry
- JE = Junior exempt
- w/o = Walkover
- r = Retired
- d = Defaulted
- SR = Special ranking

=== Draw ===
First round
1 | (India) R Bopanna (Pakistan) A-u-H Qureshi | 6 | 4 | [11]
(France) B Paire (Switzerland) S Wawrinka | 4 | 6 | [9]
(Spain) P Carreño (Spain) A Ramos | 1 | 6^{7}
WC | (Russia) K Khachanov (India) S Myneni | 6 | 7^{9}
4 | (Sweden) J Brunström (Denmark) F Nielsen | 6 | 6
(Poland) T Bednarek (Russia) M Elgin | 3 | 3
(United States) N Monroe (Germany) F Moser | 6^{4} | 1
(India) P Raja (Israel) D Sela | 7^{7} | 6
(Chinese Taipei) Y-h Lu (India) D Sharan | 2^{r}
(Spain) G García López (Austria) P Oswald | 1
(Israel) J Erlich (Israel) A Ram | 4 | 3
3 | (Germany) A Begemann (Germany) M Emmrich | 6 | 6
WC | (India) S Balaji (India) R Ramanathan | 7 | 6
(United States) S Lipsky (United States) R Ram | 5 | 3
(Croatia) M Draganja (Croatia) M Pavić | w/o
2 | (Italy) F Fognini (India) L Paes

Quarterfinals
1 | (India) R Bopanna (Pakistan) A-u-H Qureshi | 5 | 6 | [10]
WC | (Russia) K Khachanov (India) S Myneni | 7 | 2 | [12]
4 | (Sweden) J Brunström (Denmark) F Nielsen | 6 | 6
(India) P Raja (Israel) D Sela | 4 | 4
(Spain) G García López (Austria) P Oswald | 3 | 7 | [9]
3 | (Germany) A Begemann (Germany) M Emmrich | 6 | 5 | [11]
WC | (India) S Balaji (India) R Ramanathan | 3 | 3
(Croatia) M Draganja (Croatia) M Pavić | 6 | 6

Semifinals
WC | (Russia) K Khachanov (India) S Myneni | 4 | 3
4 | (Sweden) J Brunström (Denmark) F Nielsen | 6 | 6
3 | (Germany) A Begemann (Germany) M Emmrich | 6^{5} | 4
(Croatia) M Draganja (Croatia) M Pavić | 7^{7} | 6

Final
4 | (Sweden) J Brunström (Denmark) F Nielsen | 6 | 4 | [10]
(Croatia) M Draganja (Croatia) M Pavić | 2 | 6 | [7]
