= 2022 Tata Open Maharashtra – Doubles =

Doubles
- 2022 Tata Open Maharashtra

Final
- Champions: (India) Rohan Bopanna (India) Ramkumar Ramanathan
- Runners-up: (Australia) Luke Saville (Australia) John-Patrick Smith
- Score: 6–7^{(10–12)}, 6–3, [10–6]

Details
- Draw: 16
- Seeds: 4

Events
Singles	Doubles
← 2020 ·	Maharashtra Open	· 2023 →

Rohan Bopanna and Ramkumar Ramanathan defeated Luke Saville and John-Patrick Smith in the final, 6–7^{(10–12)}, 6–3, [10–6] to win the doubles tennis title at the 2022 Tata Open Maharashtra. It was their second title as a team and marked Bopanna's 21st individual career ATP Tour doubles title and Ramanathan's second. Saville and Smith were contesting their first ATP Tour doubles final together.

André Göransson and Christopher Rungkat were the defending champions from when the tournament was last held in 2020, but neither returned to compete.

== Seeds ==
1. (Australia) Luke Saville / (Australia) John-Patrick Smith (final)
2. (India) Rohan Bopanna / (India) Ramkumar Ramanathan (champions)
3. (Poland) Szymon Walków / (Poland) Jan Zieliński (first round)
4. (Australia) Marc Polmans / (Australia) Matt Reid (first round)

== Draw ==
=== Key ===
- Q = Qualifier
- WC = Wild card
- LL = Lucky loser
- Alt = Alternate
- SE = Special exempt
- PR = Protected ranking
- ITF = ITF entry
- JE = Junior exempt
- w/o = Walkover
- r = Retired
- d = Defaulted
- SR = Special ranking

=== Draw ===
First round
1	(Australia) L Saville (Australia) J-P Smith	6	6
(Italy) S Travaglia (Spain) B Zapata Miralles	1	4
WC	(India) Y Bhambri (India) D Sharan	3	4
Alt	(India) S Myneni (India) M Sasikumar	6	6
4	(Australia) M Polmans (Australia) M Reid	4	4
Alt	(Italy) G Mager (Finland) E Ruusuvuori	6	6
Alt	(India) S Balaji (India) V Vardhan	6	6
WC	(India) A Kadhe (India) P Raja	1	4
(Italy) F Gaio (Italy) L Musetti	6	4	[10]
(Mexico) H Hach Verdugo (Mexico) MÁ Reyes-Varela	4	6	[8]
(France) S Doumbia (France) F Reboul	6	7^{7}
3	(Poland) S Walków (Poland) J Zieliński	3	6^{5}
(Austria) A Erler (Czech Republic) J Veselý	7^{12}	6
Alt	(France) H Grenier (France) Q Halys	6^{10}	4
(United States) J Cerretani (United States) N Monroe	3	6	[7]
2	(India) R Bopanna (India) R Ramanathan	6	3	[10]

Quarterfinals
1	(Australia) L Saville (Australia) J-P Smith	3	7	[10]
Alt	(India) S Myneni (India) M Sasikumar	6	5	[3]
Alt	(Italy) G Mager (Finland) E Ruusuvuori
Alt	(India) S Balaji (India) V Vardhan	w/o
(Italy) F Gaio (Italy) L Musetti	6	3	[2]
(France) S Doumbia (France) F Reboul	4	6	[10]
(Austria) A Erler (Czech Republic) J Veselý	6^{3}	6^{4}
2	(India) R Bopanna (India) R Ramanathan	7^{7}	7^{7}

Semifinals
1	(Australia) L Saville (Australia) J-P Smith	6	6
Alt	(India) S Balaji (India) V Vardhan	2	4
(France) S Doumbia (France) F Reboul	4	6	[10]
2	(India) R Bopanna (India) R Ramanathan	6	4	[12]

Final
1	(Australia) L Saville (Australia) J-P Smith	7^{12}	3	[6]
2	(India) R Bopanna (India) R Ramanathan	6^{10}	6	[10]
