= 2023 Tata Open Maharashtra – Singles =

Singles
- 2023 Tata Open Maharashtra

Final
- Champion: (Netherlands) Tallon Griekspoor
- Runner-up: (France) Benjamin Bonzi
- Score: 4–6, 7–5, 6–3

Details
- Draw: 28 (4 Q / 3 WC )
- Seeds: 8

Events
Singles	Doubles
- Maharashtra Open

Tallon Griekspoor defeated Benjamin Bonzi in the final, 4–6, 7–5, 6–3 to win the singles tennis title at the 2023 Maharashtra Open. It was his first ATP Tour singles title.

João Sousa was the reigning champion, but did not participate this year.

== Seeds ==
The top four seeds receive a bye into the second round.

1. (Croatia) Marin Čilić (quarterfinals, withdrew)
2. (Netherlands) Botic van de Zandschulp (semifinals)
3. (Finland) Emil Ruusuvuori (second round)
4. (Argentina) Sebastián Báez (second round)
5. (Slovakia) Alex Molčan (first round)
6. (Serbia) Filip Krajinović (quarterfinals)
7. (Spain) Jaume Munar (first round)
8. Aslan Karatsev (semifinals)

== Draw ==
Key

- Q = Qualifier
- WC = Wild card
- LL = Lucky loser
- Alt = Alternate
- ITF = ITF entry
- PR = Protected ranking
- SR = Special ranking
- SE = Special exempt
- JE = Junior exempt
- JR = Junior Accelerator Programme entrant
- CO = College Accelerator Programme entrant
- NG = Next Gen Accelerator Program entrant
- w/o = Walkover
- r = Retired
- d = Defaulted

=== Finals ===
Semifinals
(Netherlands) Tallon Griekspoor	7^{7}	6
8	Aslan Karatsev	6^{4}	1
(France) Benjamin Bonzi	7^{7}	6^{5}	6
2	(Netherlands) Botic van de Zandschulp	6^{5}	7^{7}	1

Final
(Netherlands) Tallon Griekspoor	4	7	6
(France) Benjamin Bonzi	6	5	3

=== Top half ===
First round
(Spain) R Carballés Baena	6	7
(Spain) B Zapata Miralles	1	5
(Italy) M Cecchinato	6	6
(Georgia (country)) N Basilashvili	2	2
(Netherlands) T Griekspoor	6	7
7	(Spain) J Munar	4	5
(Spain) P Martínez	3	7	6
Q	(India) R Ramanathan	6	5	3
(Moldova) R Albot	4	4
(Netherlands) T van Rijthoven	6	6
(Spain) P Andújar	1	3
8	A Karatsev	6	6

Second round
1	(Croatia) M Čilić	6	3	6
(Spain) R Carballés Baena	3	6	1
(Italy) M Cecchinato	4	4
(Netherlands) T Griekspoor	6	6
4	(Argentina) S Báez	6	1	3
(Spain) P Martínez	3	6	6
(Netherlands) T van Rijthoven	6^{7}	6^{8}
8	A Karatsev	7^{9}	7^{10}

Quarterfinals
1	(Croatia) M Čilić
(Netherlands) T Griekspoor	w/o
(Spain) P Martínez	1	2
8	A Karatsev	6	6

Semifinals
(Netherlands) T Griekspoor	7^{7}	6
8	A Karatsev	6^{4}	1

=== Bottom half ===
First round
6	(Serbia) F Krajinović	6	4	6
WC	(India) S Nagal	4	6	4
WC	(India) M Dhamne	2	4
(United States) M Mmoh	6	6
(Chinese Taipei) C-h Tseng	0	3
(France) B Bonzi	6	6
5	(Slovakia) A Molčan	2	4
(Serbia) L Đere	6	6
Q	(Sweden) E Ymer	2	6	3
Q	(Germany) M Marterer	6	3	6
Q	(Italy) F Cobolli	6	7
WC	(India) M Sasikumar	4	5

Second round
6	(Serbia) F Krajinović	2	6	6
(United States) M Mmoh	6	3	4
(France) B Bonzi	6	7^{7}
3	(Finland) E Ruusuvuori	1	6^{4}
(Serbia) L Đere	6^{5}	2
Q	(Germany) M Marterer	7^{7}	6
Q	(Italy) F Cobolli	5	4
2	(Netherlands) B van de Zandschulp	7	6

Quarterfinals
6	(Serbia) F Krajinović	6^{5}	4
(France) B Bonzi	7^{7}	6
Q	(Germany) M Marterer	4	2
2	(Netherlands) B van de Zandschulp	6	6

Semifinals
(France) B Bonzi	7^{7}	6^{5}	6
2	(Netherlands) B van de Zandschulp	6^{5}	7^{7}	1

== Qualifying ==
=== Seeds ===
1. (United States) Christopher Eubanks (withdrew)
2. (Sweden) Elias Ymer (qualified)
3. (Italy) Mattia Bellucci (qualifying competition)
4. (Germany) Maximilian Marterer (qualified)
5. (Italy) Flavio Cobolli (qualified)
6. (Finland) Otto Virtanen (first round)
7. (Germany) Cedrik-Marcel Stebe (withdrew)
8. (Romania) Nicholas David Ionel (first round)

=== Qualifiers ===
1. (Italy) Flavio Cobolli
2. (Sweden) Elias Ymer
3. (India) Ramkumar Ramanathan
4. (Germany) Maximilian Marterer

=== Qualifying draw ===
==== First qualifier ====
First round
Alt	(India) Sidharth Rawat	1	7^{7}	1
(Czech Republic) Zdeněk Kolář	6	6^{4}	6
WC	(India) Aditya Vishal Balsekar	3	0
5	(Italy) Flavio Cobolli	6	6

Qualifying competition
(Czech Republic) Zdeněk Kolář	4	4
5	(Italy) Flavio Cobolli	6	6

==== Second qualifier ====
First round
2	(Sweden) Elias Ymer	3
(Serbia) Miljan Zekić	0^{r}
PR	(India) Yuki Bhambri	6	6
Alt	(Ecuador) Diego Hidalgo	2	2

Qualifying competition
2	(Sweden) Elias Ymer	6	6
PR	(India) Yuki Bhambri	1	4

==== Third qualifier ====
First round
3	(Italy) Mattia Bellucci	6	6
Alt	(Ukraine) Vladyslav Orlov	4	4
WC	(India) Ramkumar Ramanathan	2	7	6
6	(Finland) Otto Virtanen	6	5	2

Qualifying competition
3	(Italy) Mattia Bellucci	3	5
WC	(India) Ramkumar Ramanathan	6	7

==== Fourth qualifier ====
First round
4	(Germany) Maximilian Marterer	7^{8}	3	7
(India) Prajnesh Gunneswaran	6^{6}	6	5
(Serbia) Nikola Milojević	6	6
8	(Romania) Nicholas David Ionel	3	2

Qualifying competition
4	(Germany) Maximilian Marterer	6	6
(Serbia) Nikola Milojević	2	3
