= Singapore Women's Tennis Exhibition =

The Singapore Women's Tennis Exhibition was a women's exhibition tennis tournament held in Singapore at the Singapore Indoor Stadium, during the Friday, Saturday, and Sunday before Christmas.

Six players were invited to participate. The top two players received automatic qualification into the semi-finals, while the other four players competed in qualifying rounds for the remaining two places in the semi-finals. The event was poorly attended, leading to its discontinuation after one year.

== Finals ==
Year	Champion	Runner-up	Score	3rd	4th	Quarterfinals
2011	(Italy) Flavia Pennetta	(Poland) Agnieszka Radwańska	6-4, 7-5	(Australia) Samantha Stosur	(China) Peng Shuai	(Spain) Anabel Medina Garrigues (Slovakia) Daniela Hantuchová
