= Mohit Mayur Jayaprakash =

Indian tennis player (born 1993)

- Country (sports): India
- Residence: Chennai, India
- Born: 14 September 1993 (age 32) Mumbai, India
- Height: 1.78 m (5 ft 10 in)
- Plays: Right-handed (two-handed backhand)
- Prize money: $34,387

Singles
- Career record: 0–0 (at ATP Tour level, Grand Slam level, and in Davis Cup)
- Career titles: 0 ITF
- Highest ranking: No. 577 (1 February 2016)

Doubles
- Career record: 0–1 (at ATP Tour level, Grand Slam level, and in Davis Cup)
- Career titles: 3 ITF
- Highest ranking: No. 460 (23 May 2016)

Mohit Mayur Jakaprakash (born 14 September 1993) is an Indian tennis player.

Jayaprakash has a career high ATP singles ranking of No. 577 achieved on 1 February 2016 and a career high ATP doubles ranking of No. 460 achieved on 23 May 2016.

Jayaprakash made his ATP main draw debut at the 2012 Aircel Chennai Open in the doubles draw partnering Ramkumar Ramanathan.
