= Janko Tipsarević =

Serbian tennis player (born 1984)

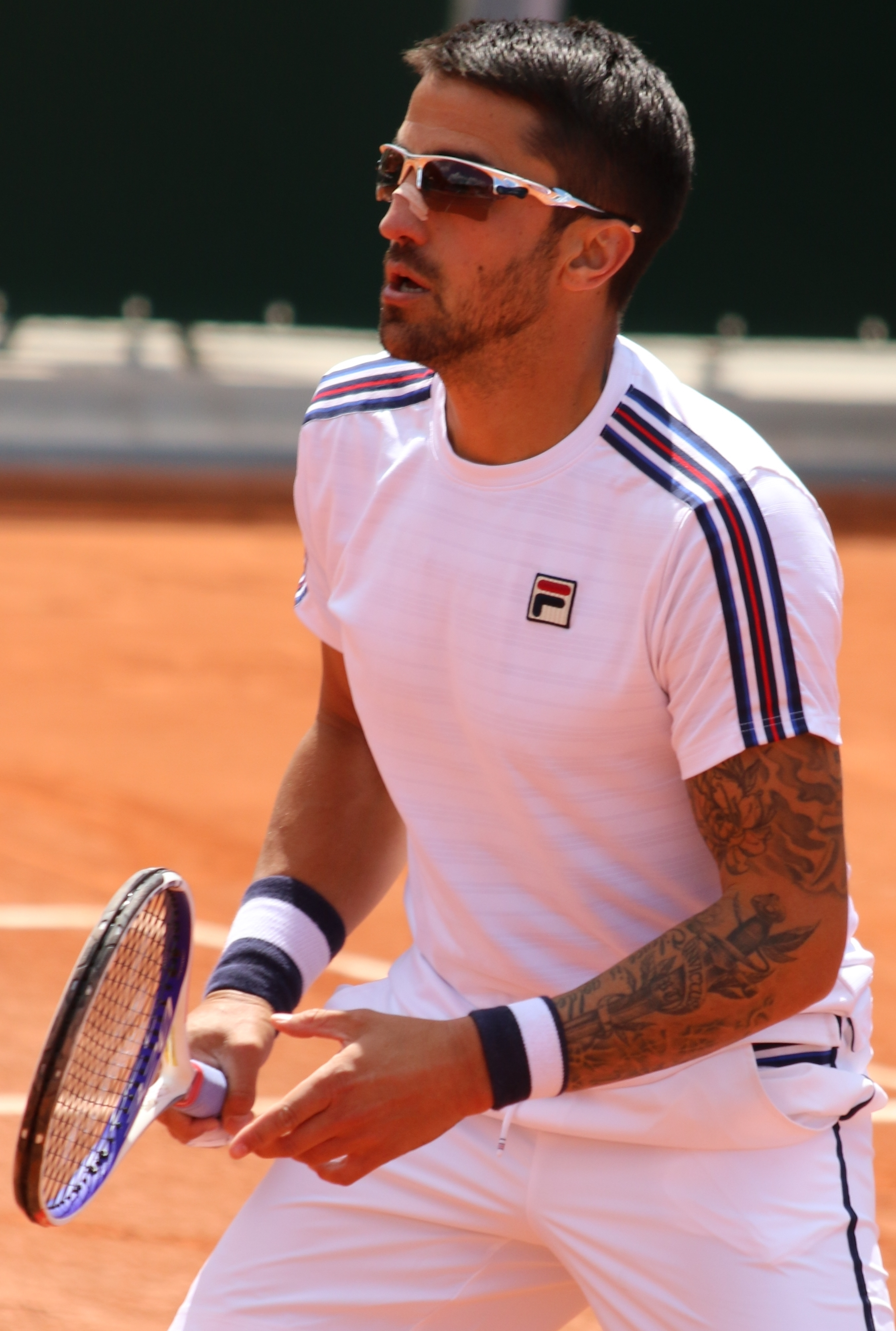
- Tipsarević at the 2019 French Open
- Country (sports): Yugoslavia (2001–2003); Serbia and Montenegro (2003–2006); Serbia (2006–2019)
- Residence: Belgrade, Serbia
- Born: 22 June 1984 (age 42) Belgrade, SR Serbia, SFR Yugoslavia
- Height: 1.80 m (5 ft 11 in)
- Turned pro: 2002
- Retired: 2019
- Plays: Right-handed (two-handed backhand)
- Coach: Dirk Hordorff (2009–2019); Rainer Schüttler (2009–2019)
- Prize money: $8,616,024

Singles
- Career record: 288–257
- Career titles: 4
- Highest ranking: No. 8 (2 April 2012)

Grand Slam singles results
- Australian Open: 4R (2013)
- French Open: 4R (2012)
- Wimbledon: 4R (2007, 2008)
- US Open: QF (2011, 2012)

Other tournaments
- Tour Finals: RR (2011, 2012)
- Olympic Games: 3R (2012)

Doubles
- Career record: 79–103
- Career titles: 1
- Highest ranking: No. 46 (25 April 2011)

Grand Slam doubles results
- Australian Open: 3R (2011)
- French Open: QF (2008, 2019)
- Wimbledon: 3R (2010)
- US Open: 3R (2009)

Other doubles tournaments
- Olympic Games: QF (2012)

Team competitions
- Davis Cup: W (2010)

Janko Tipsarević (Serbian Cyrillic: Јанко Типсаревић, pronounced [jâːŋko tipsǎːreʋitɕ]; born 22 June 1984) is a Serbian tennis coach and former professional player. In tennis, his career-high singles ranking is world No. 8, achieved on 2 April 2012. In his career, he won 4 ATP World Tour titles, one ATP doubles title, three Futures, and 15 Challenger titles. Tipsarević also won the 2001 Australian Open junior title. He holds notable victories over former world No. 1 players Carlos Moyá, Marat Safin, Lleyton Hewitt, Juan Carlos Ferrero, Andy Roddick, his compatriot Novak Djokovic, and Andy Murray. His best results at a Grand Slam tournament were reaching the quarterfinals at the US Open in 2011 and 2012.

== Early life ==
Tipsarević was born in Belgrade, Serbia (then SFR Yugoslavia). His father, Pavle, is a professor, and his mother, Vesna, is a housewife. He also has a younger brother, Veljko (Вељко). He finished high school and in 2006 completed his degree in Sports Management at the University of Belgrade.

He began pursuing tennis at age six. At the age of nine, he joined the New Belgrade Tennis Club where he trained under the guidance of Russian coach Roman Savochkin.

== Tennis career ==
=== Juniors: Australian Open champion & junior No. 1 ===
As a junior, he won the 2001 Australian Open boys' singles title, achieving the No. 1 ranking the same year (and No. 4 in doubles).

=== 2001–2004 ===
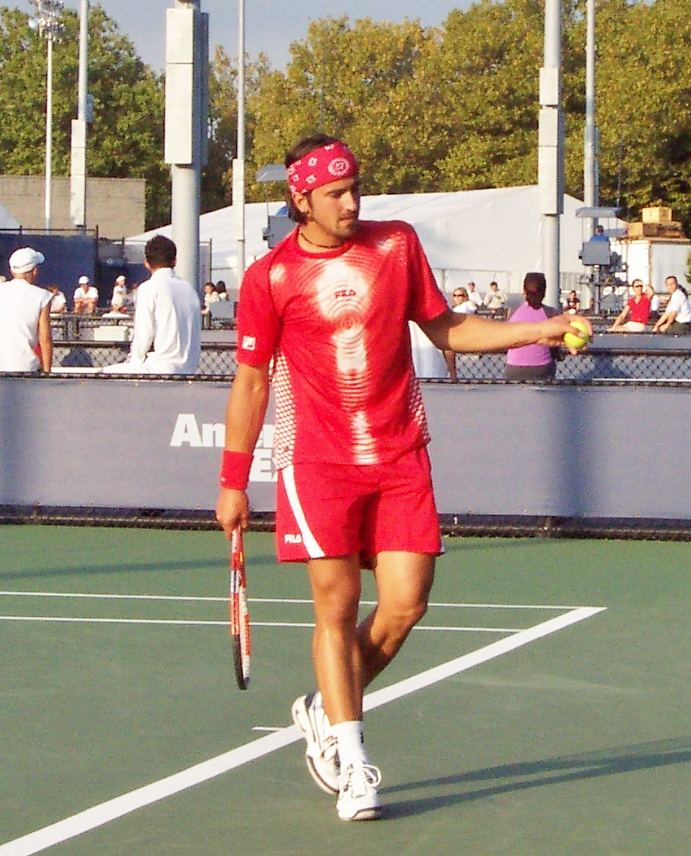
Tipsarević at the 2004 US Open

In 2001, as a member of the Yugoslav Davis Cup team he won all three matches against Poland in the Group II quarterfinal, helping the team to a 3–2 win. The following week, he won his first career Futures title in Belgrade. In 2002, he won his second Futures title in Mexico.

After winning his first ATP Challenger tournament in Germany, he made his ATP Tour debut in Indianapolis in 2003. After beating fellow Serb Nenad Zimonjić in the first round, he lost in the second round to Yevgeny Kafelnikov in straight sets. He also made his Grand Slam debut in the US Open as a qualifier. He lost to 20th seed, Mark Philippoussis in the first round. In 2004, as a qualifier, he made his first appearances at the French Open and Wimbledon, losing in the first round of each. Later that year, he won two Challenger titles in singles and one in doubles.

=== 2005–2006: Breaking top 100 ===
Tipsarević played in 15 ATP tournaments in 2005 and broke into the top 100 for the first time. He also reached the second rounds of the Australian Open and French Open. He lost to Dominik Hrbatý in the Australian Open, but was able to beat him at Roland Garros. He also reached the third round of Wimbledon, beating Tommy Haas and Lu Yen-hsun, but then lost to Thomas Johansson. In doubles, he partnered with Jiří Vaněk to win the Napoli Challenger title. He also reached the quarterfinals with fellow Serb Novak Djokovic in the Croatia Open Umag and the Vietnam Open with Marcos Baghdatis.

He finished 2006 as the No. 2 Serbian tennis player after Djokovic, and he was ranked in the top 100 for the first time at No. 65. He won four Challenger titles, compiling a 31–8 record at that level. On the ATP Tour, he reached the quarterfinals of the Nottingham Open, losing to Robin Söderling from Sweden.

=== 2007–2008: Breaking top 50 ===
After he won the Zagreb Challenger title in May 2007, Tipsarević played full-time on the ATP Tour. He reached the third round of the French Open and the quarterfinals of the Ordina Open. He has also achieved his best Grand Slam performance so far by reaching the fourth round at Wimbledon. He won all of his first three matches in five sets, and this marked the first time since 1974 that someone had won three straight five-set matches at Wimbledon. He also saved a match point in his third round victory over Australian Open runner-up Fernando González. He was eventually defeated by former French Open champion Juan Carlos Ferrero in straight sets. The win saw him rise to world No. 48, his first time inside the top 50.

Tipsarević pushed Roger Federer to five sets in the third round of the 2008 Australian Open, losing 7–6, 6–7, 7–5, 1–6, 8–10. At that time, Federer had never played a fifth set with 18 games. The match took four and a half hours to complete. His effort in making the third round of the Australian Open made Tipsarević's ranking rise from No. 49 to No. 42.

At the Wimbledon Championships, Tipsarević pulled off a second-round upset of sixth-seeded Andy Roddick in four sets, 6–7, 7–5, 6–4, 7–6. It was his fourth top-ten win. He followed that up with a win over 25th seed Dmitry Tursunov to make his second straight round-of-16 appearance at Wimbledon. He then lost his fourth-round match to Rainer Schüttler.

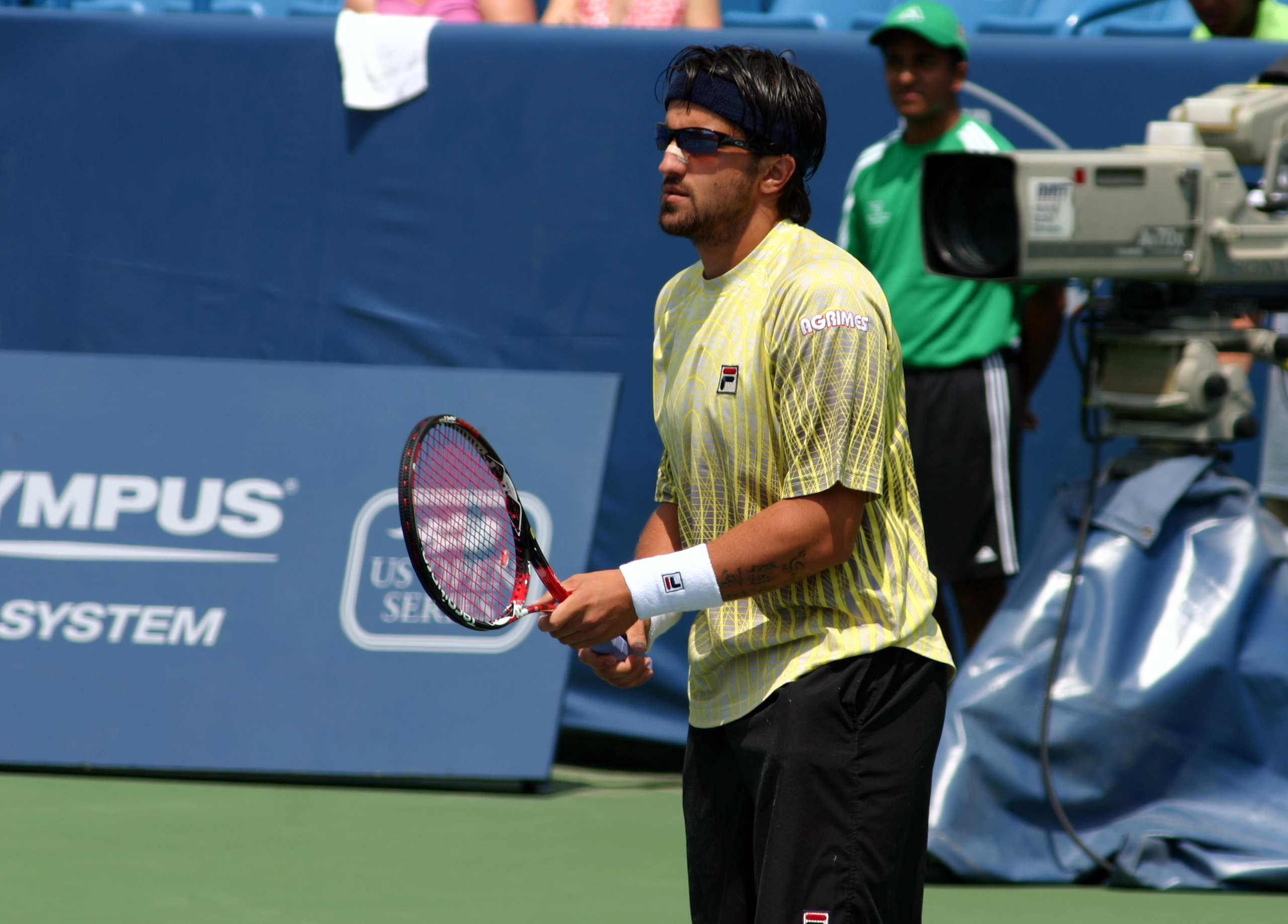
Janko Tipsarević warming up at the 2008 Western & Southern Open

=== 2009: First ATP final ===
In October 2009, at the Kremlin Cup tournament in Moscow, he advanced to his first-ever ATP final, beating Daniel Köllerer, Christophe Rochus, Robby Ginepri (beating him for the first time in three meetings), and qualifier Illya Marchenko en route. He lost to Mikhail Youzhny in the final in three sets. Despite his disappointing loss in his first final, he came out firing in the very next week, as he reached his second consecutive semifinal (for the first time) at the Bank Austria-TennisTrophy, beating eighth seed John Isner, Michael Berrer and third seed Gaël Monfils, en route. He lost to Jürgen Melzer in the semifinal in three sets, after being a set up and two points away from victory.

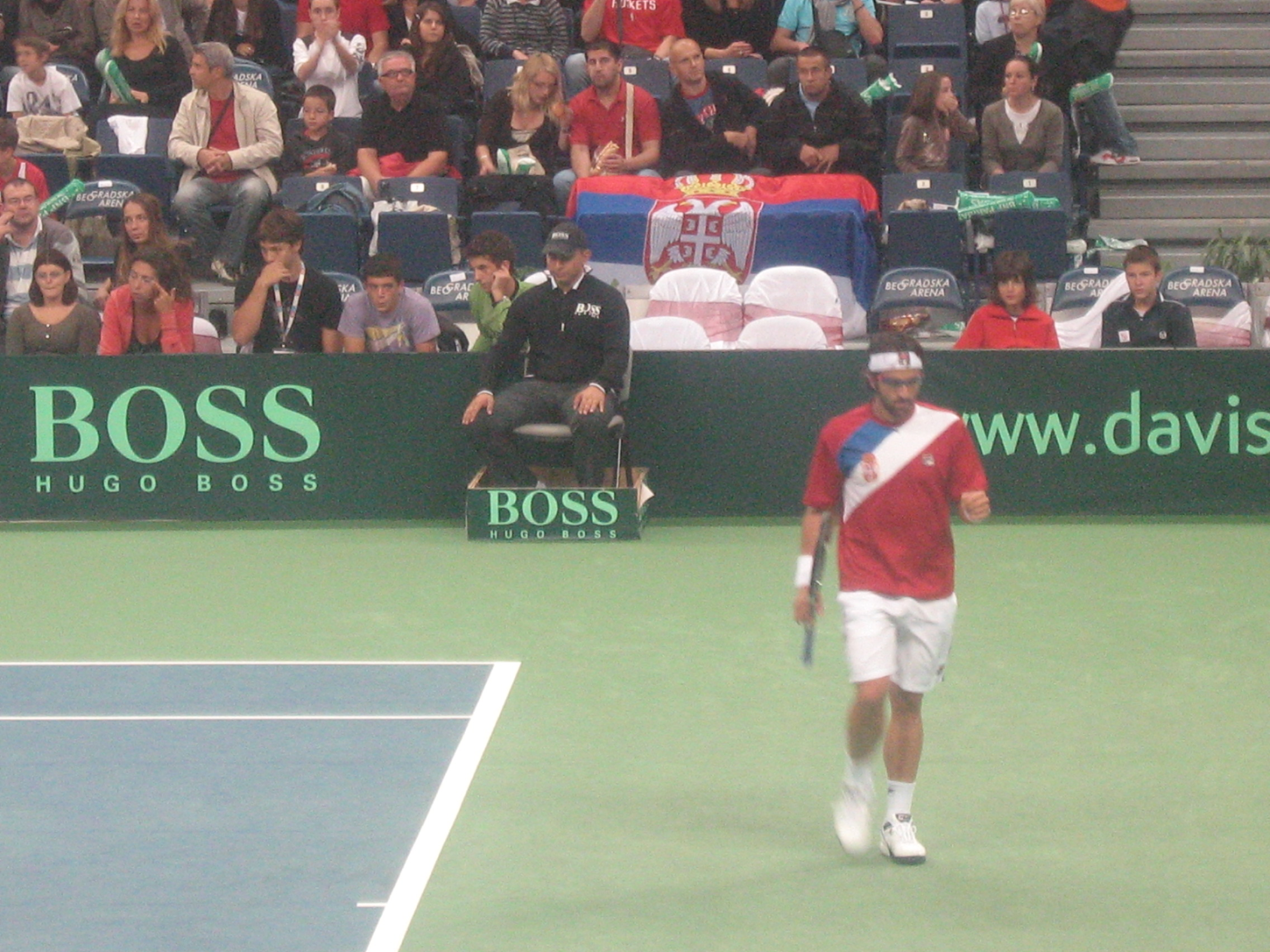
2010 Davis Cup: Tipsarević during his match against the Czech Republic

=== 2010: Davis Cup title ===
In 2010, he started off the season well by reaching the semifinals at the Chennai Open, but lost to eventual champion Marin Čilić. He reached the second round of the Australian Open, losing to Tommy Haas in five sets. He lost in the opening rounds at the Zagreb Indoors and the ABN AMRO World Tennis Tournament in Rotterdam. At the Dubai Tennis Championships, he beat Andreas Seppi in the opening round, and then stunned third seed Andy Murray in three sets, for the best win of his career to that point. Following the big win, he lost to seventh seed Mikhail Youzhny in the quarterfinals.

In June, he reached his second ATP Tour-level final in Rosmalen. He beat Jérémy Chardy, Arnaud Clément, Peter Luczak, and defending champion Benjamin Becker en route, only to lose to in-form Sergiy Stakhovsky in two sets. At the US Open, Tipsarević defeated Olivier Rochus in the first round, and then scored a big upset by beating former champion and ninth seed Andy Roddick in the second round in four sets. Advancing to the third round of the US Open for the first time, he was defeated by Gaël Monfils in a three-hour four-setter. After the US Open, Tipsarević scored key wins over Tomáš Berdych and Radek Štěpánek in the Davis Cup for Serbia, filling in for an ill Novak Djokovic. In Basel, Tipsarević lost to then world No. 2. Roger Federer in two sets.

=== 2011: Becoming a top-10 player and first ATP titles ===
Tipsarević again started the season well in Chennai, reaching the semifinals but losing to Xavier Malisse in three sets. At the Australian Open, Tipsarević reached the second round and lost in five sets to Fernando Verdasco, despite twice serving for the match and holding match points in the fourth set, 6–2, 6–4, 4–6, 6–7, 0–6. Tipsarević played in Memphis where he lost to eventual champion Andy Roddick in the second round.

His next tournament was in Delray Beach, where he reached the final. This was his third ATP final appearance overall, but he lost to Juan Martín del Potro in straight sets, despite holding a 4–1 lead in the first set. He then reached the second round of the Indian Wells Masters, defeating Tobias Kamke in straight sets but losing to Sam Querrey in the second round. Tipsarević then played the Miami Masters, reaching the fourth round on a run where he defeated Robin Haase, Marin Čilić, and Philipp Petzschner, before losing to Gilles Simon.

At the Monte-Carlo Masters, Tipsaerević was defeated in the first round by Feliciano López. He bounced back at his home event, the Serbia Open, reaching the semifinals. He defeated Kei Nishikori, Mischa Zverev, and Somdev Devvarman, before he withdrew in his match with countryman Novak Djokovic. At Roland Garros, he reached the third round, defeating Brian Dabul and Pere Riba in straight sets before losing to Roger Federer. His next event was the Queen's Club Championships where he reached the round of 16, defeating Blaž Kavčič and Michael Russell before losing to Andy Murray in two sets. At the Eastbourne International, Tipsarević reached the final. He defeated James Ward, Mikhail Kukushkin, Grigor Dimitrov, and Kei Nishikori, before losing to Andreas Seppi, retiring hurt at 3–5 in the third set. At Wimbledon, still troubled by injury, Tipsarević retired against Ivo Karlović in the first round at 1–3 in the second set.

At the German Open, after receiving a bye in the first round, he was defeated by Juan Mónaco. His form improved at the Legg Mason Tennis Classic, where he reached the quarterfinals, defeating Michael Berrer and Grigor Dimitrov, but lost to eventual finalist Gaël Monfils in straight sets. At the Rogers Cup, Tipsarević had an impressive run, defeating Alejandro Falla, Fernando Verdasco, Ivan Dodig, and Tomáš Berdych to reach his first Masters series semifinal, where he lost to Mardy Fish. Subsequently, Tipsarević entered the top 20 for the first time.

At the US Open, Tipsarević reached his first Grand Slam quarterfinal, after defeating Augustin Gensse, Philipp Petzschner, Tomáš Berdych, and Juan Carlos Ferrero, but lost to Djokovic in the quarterfinals, retiring in the fourth set due to a thigh injury. His ranking subsequently rose to No. 13. In the Davis Cup semifinal showdown between Serbia and Argentina, Tipsarević was defeated in three straight sets by Juan Martín del Potro during the second singles rubber of the tie. The defending champions, Serbia, eventually lost the tie 2–3 against Argentina. At the Malaysian Open in Kuala Lumpur, he was third seed. He defeated Flavio Cipolla, in the opening round. In the quarterfinals, he played just four games as Nikolay Davydenko retired as Tipsarević led 3–1. In the semifinals, he improved his unbeaten head-to-head record to 5–0 against Kei Nishikori as he dispatched him in straight sets. In the final, he won his first ATP title in five attempts, defeating Marcos Baghdatis. Tipsarević suffered first-round exits at the Japan Open to Dmitry Tursunov, and at the Shanghai Masters to Feliciano López.

He rebounded at the Kremlin Cup in Moscow, winning the title as the top seed. He defeated Igor Kunitsyn, avenged his loss against Dmitry Tursunov, and downed home favourite Nikolay Davydenko, saving three consecutive set points on his serve at *0–40 during *4–5 in the second set, to reach the sixth final of his career. In the first all-Serbian final in tennis history, Tipsarević defeated his good friend, compatriot, and defending champion Viktor Troicki in two sets, to win his second career title. The following week, he reached the St. Petersburg Open final, losing to Croatian Marin Čilić in three sets. Thanks to his regularity and despite the loss, he became the first player in the world to reach both Kremlin Cup and St. Petersburg finals consecutively in the same year. At the Swiss Indoors in Basel, he retired in his opening round match against Florian Mayer to a hamstring injury. At the BNP Paribas Masters, he defeated Alex Bogomolov Jr., losing just a one-game, in his opening second-round match. In the third round, he wasted a 5–1 lead in the first set and a 4–2 lead in the second to lose against Tomáš Berdych for the first time in five meetings.

On 22 November, Andy Murray announced his withdrawal from the ATP World Tour Finals. Because Tipsarević was the first alternate, he was able to make his debut at the year-end championships. Placed in Group A in the round-robin stage, Tipsarević was drawn against Berdych and had a chance to avenge his recent loss in Paris against him. Janko almost defeated him by reaching match point before eventually losing in 3 sets. Undeterred by the painful loss, he capped off his career-best season in style as he notched arguably the best win of his career in his next match by defeating his good friend Djokovic, for his first win over a world No. 1 player, as well as his first win in the year-end championships. Tipsarević ended the season at a career-high ranking of world No. 9.

=== 2012: Maintaining in the top 10 ===
Tipsarević began 2012 at the ATP Aircel Chennai Open, making the final but losing to Milos Raonic. At the Australian Open, Tipsarević was seeded ninth. He defeated Dmitry Tursunov in the first round, continuing in the same fashion against James Duckworth in the second round. He eventually lost to 17th seed Richard Gasquet in the third round in straight sets. Tipsarević reached the quarterfinals of the Miami Masters, losing to runner-up Andy Murray and moved up to world No. 8, surpassing Mardy Fish.

Tipsarević represented Serbia in the Davis Cup quarterfinal clash with the Czech Republic, which was played on clay in Prague. Tipsarević beat Radek Štěpánek in his opening singles rubber in five sets, saving three match points, but fell in the fourth rubber to Tomáš Berdych, after squandering set points in all three sets, to lose the overall tie 1–3. At the first ATP Master Series 1000 clay event of 2012 in Monte Carlo, he defeated Albert Montañés, before losing to Gilles Simon in three sets in the third round. At the Madrid Open, he defeated Federico Delbonis in the first round, before avenging his loss to Gilles Simon by beating him for the first time in five meetings. In the quarterfinals, he upset world No. 1 Novak Djokovic in straight sets to reach his second semifinal in a masters event, and his first on clay. In the semifinals, however, he lost to then world No. 3, Roger Federer, in two sets. At Rome, he lost in the opening round to Stan Wawrinka in straight sets. Tipsarević reached the fourth round of the French Open, where he lost to Nicolás Almagro.

At Wimbledon, Janko reached the third round, where he lost to Mikhail Youzhny in four sets. Tipsarević made it to the quarterfinals of the MercedesCup by defeating Steve Darcis of Belgium. In the quarterfinals, he saved four match points in the second set to beat Björn Phau. In the semifinals, he defeated Thomaz Bellucci in another hard-fought three-set victory, to reach his first clay-court final. In the final, he defeated Juan Mónaco in three sets for his first title of 2012 (third in his career).

Tipsarević continued his run of play in Gstaad, where he reached the final. However, he lost to Thomaz Bellucci in three sets. At the Rogers Cup, he got past Mikhail Youzhny, Marin Čilić, and Marcel Granollers to reach his third Masters semifinal, but fell to Djokovic in two sets.

At the US Open, Tipsarević successfully defended his points from the year before, reaching the quarterfinals of a Grand Slam for the second time in his career where he lost to David Ferrer in five sets after being up 4–1 and 0–30 on Ferrer's serve in the final set. At the BNP Paribas Masters he defeated Juan Mónaco in the third round to book the final spot for the 2012 ATP World Tour Finals. He won Clash of Continents Exhibition as representative of Europe. For the whole of the 2012 season he stayed in the top 10.

=== 2013–2014: Fourth ATP title and string of injuries ===
Tipsarević began his season by going one step better than the previous year to lift the 2013 Aircel Chennai Open title, defeating surprise finalist Roberto Bautista Agut in the final.

At the Australian Open, he defeated Lleyton Hewitt, Lukáš Lacko and Julien Benneteau to reach a career-best fourth round of that tournament. He lost to Nicolás Almagro after retiring due to a foot injury late in the second set. In the French Open, he lost in the third round to Mikhail Youzhny in a match that was marred by an altercation with a screaming fan. At Wimbledon he lost to countryman Viktor Troicki in the first round. He made the fourth round of the US Open.

In 2014, Tipsarević underwent foot surgery in Frankfurt for the injury suffered in Valencia. The operation was successful, and he hoped to resume his career soon.

=== 2015: Return from injury and time off ===
Following 17 months of inactivity, Tipsarević made a return to the ATP World Tour, stating: "My goal and dream would be to come back to the top 10, and I don’t have many weeks to waste." He began his season in March, partnering Djokovic in doubles at the Miami Masters, which Tipsarević had entered using a protected ranking (PR). The pair lost a close first-round match to Robert Lindstedt and Jürgen Melzer. In April, Tipsarević received a wild card for the U.S. Clay Court Championships in Houston, where he saved two match points to defeat qualifier Guilherme Clezar in the opening round. He followed this up with a competitive loss to fifth seed Santiago Giraldo. In doubles, Tipsarević and Philipp Petzschner lost to top seeds, the Bryan brothers. Later in the month, Tipsarević participated in the Romanian Open, defeating qualifier Thomas Fabbiano. In the second round, he was defeated by top seed Gilles Simon. At the BMW Open he defeated Bernard Tomic (world 27), before being halted by Víctor Estrella Burgos Next, in May, he was given a wildcard for the Masters Madrid event qualifying draw. In the first qualifying round, Tipsarević beat third seed and No. 61 Vasek Pospisil in straight sets, but lost the next qualifying round 2–1 sets to youngster No. 103 Thanasi Kokkinakis. Next, he took part in the clay court Geneva Open event, where he was again given a wildcard into the main draw. However, he lost in straight sets to No. 66 Denis Istomin in the first round. In June, Tipsarević played at Wimbledon. He lost in straight sets to Marcel Granollers in the first round. He had better luck at the US Open, taking Guillermo García López to five sets in defeat. He and Radu Albot lost in three sets to Aliaksandr Bury and Denis Istomin in the first round of doubles. He did not play on tour for the rest of the year.

=== 2016: Late return to form ===
With a continuing foot injury, he withdrew from the Australian Open. He suffered first round exits at Roland Garros and Wimbledon, however in August his season built serious momentum when he won the China International Challenger. As a result, he moved up 160 spots in the world rankings. He followed up his newfound form at the US Open with a four-set victory over 29th seed Sam Querrey, his first grand slam match victory in three years. A semifinal appearance at the Shenzhen Open saw him jump a further 51 spots to become ranked 173. Five more match victories across five ATP tournaments led him to finish the year ranked 144.

=== 2017: Return to top 60 ===
With no points to defend until April, Janko capitalized on this by playing the Bangkok Challenger I and II, which he went on to win both. These two titles have led him to rise to No. 104 in the ATP world rankings. Janko played his first tournament on the ATP World Tour, when he was given a wild card into the draw in Quito. He won his first round match after Daniel Gimeno Traver retired when 4–1 down. However, in the second round, Janko lost in two tiebreak sets to Thomaz Bellucci. Despite early exits at the Argentina and Rio Open, to his credit he lost to the eventual champions of those tournaments. Tipsarević partnered with Troicki at the 2017 US Open but lost first round. In singles, he beat Kokkinakis in the first round, but lost to Schwartzman in the second round.

=== 2018–19: Absence from tour and comeback ===
Tipsarević had been absent from tour since the 2017 US Open. He was unranked in singles at the conclusion of the 2018 US Open. Aside from a three-week period during May 2015, this was the first time he had been unranked in singles since September 2000. At the close of 2018 he had been inactive due to injury for the entire year, therefore had zero ranking points. However, he qualified for a protected ranking of 88 which automatically qualified him for Grand Slam events for one year. He would need attain approximately 500 ranking points over the next year in order to maintain a spot in the top 100 rankings in order to gain direct entry into grand slam events. As such he announced that he would participate in the main draw of the 2019 Australian Open.

== Davis Cup ==
Tipsarević has played for the Serbian Davis Cup team every year from 2000 to 2013 and has last played in 2016. During his playing time the country was known as FR Yugoslavia until 2003, Serbia and Montenegro between 2003 and 2006 and Serbia since 2006. In 2010, he was the hero in steering the Serbian team into their first historic Davis Cup final after prevailing over Radek Štěpánek to complete the 1–2 come-from-behind victory to help clinch the tie 3–2 over the Czech Republic. His record is 34–15 in singles and 7–3 in doubles. Once again, in 2013 he was the hero. His victory over Vasek Pospisil of Canada in the last tie completed the 1–2 come-from-behind victory against Canada to reach the second final for Serbia. Before the match against Canada, Tipsarević together with Novak Djokovic, Nenad Zimonjić, and Slobodan Živojinović received their Davis Cup Commitment Award, which is granted to players who have shown long-standing dedication to representing their country in the competition.

== Endorsements ==
Janko is or was sponsored in the past by Tecnifibre, Fila, Oakley, Tennis Flex, Extreme Intimo, Trion:Z/Colantotte, Instaforex, Telekom Srbija.

== Politics ==
He is also a politician, serving as a member of the City Assembly of Belgrade since 21 June 2024. He is also a member of the populist Serbian Progressive Party (SNS).

== Significant finals ==
=== Masters 1000 finals ===
==== Doubles: 1 (0–1) ====
Outcome	Year	Championship	Surface	Partner	Opponents	Score
Runner-up	2012	Rome Masters	Clay	(Poland) Łukasz Kubot	(Spain) Marcel Granollers (Spain) Marc López	3–6, 2–6

== ATP career finals ==
=== Singles: 11 (4 titles, 7 runner-ups) ===
Legend Grand Slam Tournaments (0–0) ATP World Tour Masters 1000 (0–0) ATP World Tour 500 Series (0–0) ATP World Tour 250 Series (4–7)	Finals by surface Hard (3–4) Clay (1–1) Grass (0–2) Carpet (0–0)

Result	W–L	Date	Tournament	Surface	Opponent	Score
Loss	0–1	Oct 2009	Kremlin Cup, Russia	Hard (i)	(Russia) Mikhail Youzhny	7–6^{(7–5)}, 0–6, 4–6
Loss	0–2	Jun 2010	Rosmalen Championships, Netherlands	Grass	(Ukraine) Sergiy Stakhovsky	3–6, 0–6
Loss	0–3	Feb 2011	Delray Beach Open, United States	Hard	(Argentina) Juan Martín del Potro	4–6, 4–6
Loss	0–4	Jun 2011	Aegon International, United Kingdom	Grass	(Italy) Andreas Seppi	6–7^{(5–7)}, 6–3, 3–5 ret.
Win	1–4	Oct 2011	Kuala Lumpur, Malaysia	Hard (i)	(Cyprus) Marcos Baghdatis	6–4, 7–5
Win	2–4	Oct 2011	Kremlin Cup, Russia	Hard (i)	(Serbia) Viktor Troicki	6–4, 6–2
Loss	2–5	Oct 2011	St. Petersburg Open, Russia	Hard (i)	(Croatia) Marin Čilić	3–6, 6–3, 2–6
Loss	2–6	Jan 2012	Chennai Open, India	Hard	(Canada) Milos Raonic	7–6^{(7–4)}, 6–7^{(4–7)}, 6–7^{(4–7)}
Win	3–6	Jul 2012	Stuttgart Open, Germany	Clay	(Argentina) Juan Mónaco	6–4, 5–7, 6–3
Loss	3–7	Jul 2012	Gstaad, Switzerland	Clay	(Brazil) Thomaz Bellucci	7–6^{(8–6)}, 4–6, 2–6
Win	4–7	Jan 2013	Chennai Open, India	Hard	(Spain) Roberto Bautista Agut	3–6, 6–1, 6–3

=== Doubles: 4 (1–3) ===
Legend Grand Slam Tournaments (0–0) ATP World Tour Masters 1000 (0–1) ATP World Tour 500 Series (0–0) ATP World Tour 250 Series (1–2)	Finals by surface Hard (1–2) Clay (0–1) Grass (0–0) Carpet (0–0)

Result	W–L	Date	Tournament	Surface	Partner	Opponents	Score
Loss	0–1	Jan 2010	Chennai Open, India	Hard	(Chinese Taipei) Lu Yen-hsun	(Spain) Marcel Granollers (Spain) Santiago Ventura	5–7, 2–6
Loss	0–2	Oct 2010	Kremlin Cup, Moscow	Hard	(Serbia) Viktor Troicki	(Russia) Igor Kunitsyn (Russia) Dmitry Tursunov	6–7^{(6–8)}, 3–6
Win	1–2	Jan 2012	Chennai Open, India	Hard	(India) Leander Paes	(Israel) Jonathan Erlich (Israel) Andy Ram	6–4, 6–4
Loss	1–3	May 2012	Italian Open, Rome	Clay	(Poland) Łukasz Kubot	(Spain) Marcel Granollers (Spain) Marc López	3–6, 2–6

== Team competition finals: 3 (3–0) ==
Outcome	No.	Date	Team competition	Surface	Partner/team	Opponents	Score
Winner	1.	23 May 2009	World Team Cup, Düsseldorf	Clay	(Serbia) Viktor Troicki (Serbia) Nenad Zimonjić	(Germany) Rainer Schüttler (Germany) Philipp Kohlschreiber (Germany) Nicolas Kiefer (Germany) Mischa Zverev	2–1
Winner	2.	3–5 December 2010	Davis Cup, Belgrade	Hard (i)	(Serbia) Novak Djokovic (Serbia) Viktor Troicki (Serbia) Nenad Zimonjić	(France) Gaël Monfils (France) Michaël Llodra (France) Arnaud Clément (France) Gilles Simon	3–2
Winner	3.	21 May 2012	World Team Cup, Düsseldorf	Clay	(Serbia) Viktor Troicki (Serbia) Nenad Zimonjić (Serbia) Miki Janković	(Czech Republic) Tomáš Berdych (Czech Republic) Radek Štěpánek (Czech Republic) František Čermák	3–0

== Junior Grand Slam finals ==
=== Boys' singles (1 title) ===
Result	Year	Championship	Surface	Opponent	Score
Winner	2001	Australian Open	Hard	(Chinese Taipei) Wang Yeu-tzuoo	3–6, 7–5, 6–0

== Performance timelines ==
Key
W	F	SF	QF	#R	RR	Q#	P#	DNQ	A	Z#	PO	G	S	B	NMS	NTI	P	NH

(W) winner; (F) finalist; (SF) semifinalist; (QF) quarterfinalist; (#R) rounds 4, 3, 2, 1; (RR) round-robin stage; (Q#) qualification round; (P#) preliminary round; (DNQ) did not qualify; (A) absent; (Z#) Davis/Fed Cup Zonal Group (with number indication) or (PO) play-off; (G) gold, (S) silver or (B) bronze Olympic/Paralympic medal; (NMS) not a Masters tournament; (NTI) not a Tier I tournament; (P) postponed; (NH) not held; (SR) strike rate (events won / competed); (W–L) win–loss record.

=== Singles ===
Tournament	2000	2001	2002	2003	2004	2005	2006	2007	2008	2009	2010	2011	2012	2013	2014	2015	2016	2017	2018	2019	SR	W–L	Win%
Grand Slam tournaments
Australian Open	A	A	A	A	Q1	2R	2R	1R	3R	2R	2R	2R	3R	4R	A	A	A	A	A	1R	0 / 10	12–10	55%
French Open	A	A	A	Q3	1R	2R	1R	3R	1R	3R	1R	3R	4R	3R	A	A	1R	1R	A	1R	0 / 13	12–13	48%
Wimbledon	A	A	A	Q2	1R	3R	1R	4R	4R	2R	1R	1R	3R	1R	A	1R	1R	1R	A	2R	0 / 14	12–14	46%
US Open	A	A	A	1R	1R	1R	A	2R	1R	1R	3R	QF	QF	4R	A	1R	2R	2R	A	1R	0 / 14	16–14	53%
Win–loss	0–0	0–0	0–0	0–1	0–3	4–4	1–3	6–4	5–4	4–4	3–4	7–4	11–4	8–4	0–0	0–2	1–3	1–3	0–0	1–4	0 / 51	52–51	50%
Year-end championships
ATP Finals	did not qualify											RR	RR	did not qualify							0 / 2	1–4	20%
National representation
Summer Olympics	A	not held			A	not held			2R	not held			3R	not held			A	not held			0 / 2	3–2	60%
Davis Cup	Z3	Z2	Z2	Z2	Z2	Z1	PO	PO	1R	1R	W	SF	QF	F	A	A	QF	A	A	QF	1 / 8	34–15	69%
World Team Cup	A	A	A	A	A	A	A	A	A	W	A	RR	W	not held							2 / 3	8–2	80%
Win–loss	1–0	2–1	1–1	4–2	4–0	4–0	2–3	2–1	2–1	4–2	4–2	8–2	5–2	1–1	0–0	0–0	1–1	0–0	0–0	0–0	3 / 12	45–19	70%
ATP Tour Masters 1000
Indian Wells Masters	A	A	A	A	A	A	2R	3R	1R	1R	2R	2R	3R	2R	A	A	A	A	A	A	0 / 8	5–8	38%
Miami Open	A	A	A	A	A	A	Q1	2R	QF	3R	2R	4R	QF	4R	A	A	A	A	A	2R	0 / 8	16–8	67%
Monte-Carlo Masters	A	A	A	A	A	A	A	A	3R	2R	A	1R	3R	2R	A	A	A	A	A	A	0 / 5	4–5	44%
Madrid Open^{1}	A	A	A	A	A	A	A	A	3R	1R	A	A	SF	1R	A	Q2	A	A	A	A	0 / 4	5–4	56%
Italian Open	A	A	A	A	A	A	A	Q1	1R	2R	1R	A	2R	A	A	A	A	A	A	A	0 / 4	1–4	20%
Canadian Open	A	A	A	A	A	A	A	A	1R	A	1R	SF	SF	1R	A	1R	A	A	A	A	0 / 6	7–6	54%
Cincinnati Masters	A	A	A	A	A	Q1	A	A	1R	A	A	2R	2R	2R	A	A	A	2R	A	A	0 / 5	2–5	29%
Shanghai Masters^{2}	A	A	A	A	A	A	A	A	Q1	A	2R	1R	3R	1R	A	A	2R	A	A	A	0 / 5	3–5	37%
Paris Masters	A	A	A	A	A	A	1R	2R	1R	A	A	3R	QF	A	A	A	A	A	A	A	0 / 5	4–5	44%
Win–loss	0–0	0–0	0–0	0–0	0–0	0–0	1–2	4–3	8–8	4–5	1–5	10–7	14–9	3–7	0–0	0–1	1–1	0–1	0–0	1–1	0 / 50	47–50	48%
Career statistics
	2000	2001	2002	2003	2004	2005	2006	2007	2008	2009	2010	2011	2012	2013	2014	2015	2016	2017	2018	2019	Career		
Tournaments^{3}	0	0	0	2	7	15	17	21	22	23	22	26	26	24	0	7	10	12	0	11	245		
Titles	0	0	0	0	0	0	0	0	0	0	0	2	1	1	0	0	0	0	0	0	4		
Finals	0	0	0	0	0	0	0	0	0	1	1	5	3	1	0	0	0	0	0	0	11		
Overall win–loss^{4}	0–0	2–0	1–1	5–4	5–7	11–15	10–20	19–22	26–21	30–25	25–23	54–26	57–28	20–24	0–0	3–7	8–11	5–12	0–0	7–11	288–257		
Win %	–	100%	50%	56%	42%	42%	33%	46%	55%	55%	52%	68%	67%	45%	–	30%	44%	29%	–	39%	52.84%		
Year-end ranking	1078	636	183	161	117	139	64	52	49	38	49	9	9	36	–	410	144	105	–	219	$8,616,024		

^{1} Held as Hamburg Masters (outdoor clay) until 2008, Madrid Masters (outdoor clay) 2009 – present.
^{2} Held as Stuttgart Masters (indoor hard) until 2001, Madrid Masters (indoor hard) from 2002 to 2008, and Shanghai Masters (outdoor hard) 2009 – present.
^{3} Including appearances in Grand Slam and ATP World Tour main draw matches, and in Summer Olympics.
^{4} Including matches in Grand Slam, in ATP World Tour, in Summer Olympics, in Davis Cup, and in World Team Cup.

=== Doubles ===
Tournament	2000	2001	2002	2003	2004	2005	2006	2007	2008	2009	2010	2011	2012	2013	2014	2015	2016	2017	2018	2019	SR	W–L
Grand Slam tournaments
Australian Open	A	A	A	A	A	A	A	1R	1R	1R	1R	3R	A	A	A	A	A	A	A	A	0 / 5	2–5
French Open	A	A	A	A	A	A	3R	A	QF	A	A	2R	A	A	A	A	1R	1R	A	QF	0 / 6	9–6
Wimbledon	A	A	A	A	A	A	1R	1R	2R	A	3R	A	A	A	A	1R	1R	A	A	1R	0 / 7	3–7
US Open	A	A	A	A	A	A	A	1R	A	3R	1R	A	A	A	A	1R	2R	1R	A	1R	0 / 7	3–7
Win–loss	0–0	0–0	0–0	0–0	0–0	0–0	2–2	0–3	4–3	2–2	2–3	3–2	0–0	0–0	0–0	0–2	1–3	0–2	0–0	3–3	0 / 25	17–25
National representation
Summer Olympics	A	not held			A	not held			A	not held			QF	not held			A	not held			0 / 1	2–1
Davis Cup	Z3	Z2	Z2	Z2	Z2	Z1	PO	PO	1R	1R	W	SF	QF	F	A	A	QF	A	A	QF	1 / 8	8–4
World Team Cup	A	A	A	A	A	A	A	A	A	W	A	RR	W	not held							2 / 3	1–2
Win–loss	4–0	1–0	0–0	0–0	0–0	0–0	0–1	0–0	0–0	1–0	1–1	0–2	3–2	0–0	0–0	0–0	0–0	0–0	0–0	1–1	3 / 12	11–7
ATP Tour Masters 1000
Indian Wells Masters	A	A	A	A	A	A	A	A	A	A	2R	1R	A	QF	A	A	A	A	A	A	0 / 3	3–2
Miami Open	A	A	A	A	A	A	A	A	A	A	A	SF	QF	2R	A	1R	A	A	A	A	0 / 4	6–4
Monte-Carlo Masters	A	A	A	A	A	A	A	A	A	A	A	1R	A	1R	A	A	A	A	A	A	0 / 2	0–2
Madrid Open^{1}	A	A	A	A	A	A	A	A	A	A	A	A	A	A	A	A	A	A	A	A	0 / 0	0–0
Italian Open	A	A	A	A	A	A	A	A	A	A	2R	A	F	A	A	A	A	A	A	A	0 / 2	5–2
Canadian Open	A	A	A	A	A	A	A	A	A	A	A	2R	A	1R	A	SF	A	A	A	A	0 / 3	4–3
Cincinnati Masters	A	A	A	A	A	A	A	A	1R	A	1R	1R	2R	1R	A	A	A	A	A	1R	0 / 6	1–4
Shanghai Masters^{2}	A	A	A	A	A	A	A	A	A	A	2R	2R	A	A	A	A	A	A	A	A	0 / 2	2–2
Paris Masters	A	A	A	A	A	A	A	A	A	A	A	A	A	A	A	A	A	A	A	A	0 / 0	0–0
Win–loss	0–0	0–0	0–0	0–0	0–0	0–0	0–0	0–0	0–0	0–0	3–3	5–6	7–2	3–5	0–0	3–2	0–0	0–0	0–0	0–1	0 / 22	21–19
Career statistics
	2000	2001	2002	2003	2004	2005	2006	2007	2008	2009	2010	2011	2012	2013	2014	2015	2016	2017	2018	2019	Career	
Tournaments^{3}	0	0	0	0	0	2	6	11	9	7	17	12	11	8	0	6	6	4	0	5	104	
Titles / Finals	0 / 0	0 / 0	0 / 0	0 / 0	0 / 0	0 / 0	0 / 0	0 / 0	0 / 0	0 / 0	0 / 2	0 / 0	1 / 2	0 / 0	0 / 0	0 / 0	0 / 0	0 / 0	0 / 0	0 / 0	1 / 4	
Overall win–loss^{4}	0–0	1–0	0–0	0–0	0–0	2–1	3–7	1–11	5–8	6–7	18–17	11–14	19–9	4–7	0–0	3–6	2–6	0–4	0–0	4–6	79–103	
Year-end ranking	–	–	456	402	242	312	206	470	125	192	70	85	54	236	–	200	418	–	–	187	43.41%	

== Record against top-ten players ==
Tipsarević's match record against those who have been ranked in the top 10, with those who have been No. 1 in boldface

- (Japan) Kei Nishikori 5–0
- (Spain) Fernando Verdasco 5–2
- (Czech Republic) Tomáš Berdych 5–3
- (Bulgaria) Grigor Dimitrov 4–3
- (France) Arnaud Clément 3–1
- (Czech Republic) Radek Štěpánek 3–1
- (Argentina) David Nalbandian 3–2
- (Argentina) Juan Mónaco 3–3
- (United Kingdom) **Andy Murray** 3–5
- (Russia) Mikhail Youzhny 3–5
- (Italy) Fabio Fognini 2–0
- (Belgium) David Goffin 2–0
- (Thailand) Paradorn Srichaphan 2–0
- (Cyprus) Marcos Baghdatis 2–2
- (Latvia) Ernests Gulbis 2–2
- (Croatia) Ivan Ljubičić 2–2
- (United States) **Andy Roddick** 2–2
- (Russia) Nikolay Davydenko 2–3
- (Australia) **Lleyton Hewitt** 2–3
- (France) Gaël Monfils 2–4
- (Serbia) **Novak Djokovic** 2–5
- (Croatia) Marin Čilić 2–8
- (France) Gilles Simon 2–9
- (United States) James Blake 1–0
- (United States) Jack Sock 1–0
- (United States) John Isner 1–1
- (Ecuador) Nicolás Lapentti 1–1
- (Austria) Jürgen Melzer 1–1
- (Spain) **Carlos Moyá** 1–1
- (Russia) **Marat Safin** 1–1
- (South Africa) Kevin Anderson 1–2
- (Spain) **Juan Carlos Ferrero** 1–2
- (Sweden) Thomas Johansson 1–2
- (Spain) Roberto Bautista Agut 1–3
- (Chile) Fernando González 1–3
- (Germany) Tommy Haas 1–3
- (United States) Mardy Fish 1–4
- (Spain) David Ferrer 1–6
- (Spain) Pablo Carreño Busta 0–1
- (Russia) **Yevgeny Kafelnikov** 0–1
- (Russia) Karen Khachanov 0–1
- (Australia) Mark Philippoussis 0–1
- (United Kingdom) Greg Rusedski 0–1
- (Germany) Rainer Schüttler 0–1
- (Argentina) Diego Schwartzman 0–1
- (Austria) Dominic Thiem 0–1
- (France) Jo-Wilfried Tsonga 0–1
- (Switzerland) Stan Wawrinka 0–1
- (Spain) Nicolás Almagro 0–2
- (Chile) Nicolás Massú 0–2
- (Argentina) Mariano Puerta 0–2
- (Spain) Tommy Robredo 0–2
- (Sweden) Robin Söderling 0–2
- (France) Richard Gasquet 0–3
- (Spain) **Rafael Nadal** 0–3
- (Argentina) Juan Martín del Potro 0–4
- (Canada) Milos Raonic 0–5
- (Switzerland) **Roger Federer** 0–6

== Wins over top 10 players ==
- He has a 15–47 (24.2%) record against players who were, at the time the match was played, ranked in the top 10.

Season	2002	2003	2004	2005	2006	2007	2008	2009	2010	2011	2012	2013	2014	2015	2016	2017	2018	2019	Total
Wins	0	0	0	0	0	1	4	1	3	3	3	0	0	0	0	0	0	0	15

#	Player	Rank	Event	Surface	Rd	Score
2007
1.	(Chile) Fernando González	6	Wimbledon, UK	Grass	3R	6–3, 3–6, 6–3, 4–6, 8–6
2008
2.	(Russia) Mikhail Youzhny	8	Rotterdam, Netherlands	Hard (i)	1R	7–6^{(7–3)}, 6–2
3.	(United States) James Blake	8	Hamburg, Germany	Clay	2R	4–6, 6–3, 6–3
4.	(United States) Andy Roddick	6	Wimbledon, UK	Grass	2R	6–7^{(5–7)}, 7–5, 6–4, 7–6^{(7–4)}
5.	(Spain) David Ferrer	4	Olympic Games, Beijing	Hard	1R	7–6^{(10–8)}, 6–2
2009
6.	(France) Gaël Monfils	10	Monte Carlo, Monaco	Clay	1R	6–3, 6–1
2010
7.	(United Kingdom) Andy Murray	4	Dubai, United Arab Emirates	Hard	1R	7–6^{(7–3)}, 4–6, 6–4
8.	(United States) Andy Roddick	9	US Open, New York	Hard	2R	3–6, 7–5, 6–3, 7–6^{(7–4)}
9.	(Czech Republic) Tomáš Berdych	7	Davis Cup, Belgrade	Hard (i)	RR	7–5, 6–2, 2–6, 7–6^{(7–5)}
2011
10.	(Czech Republic) Tomáš Berdych	9	Montreal, Canada	Hard	QF	6–3, 6–1
11.	(Czech Republic) Tomáš Berdych	9	US Open, New York	Hard	3R	6–4, 5–0 ret.
12.	(Serbia) Novak Djokovic	1	ATP World Tour Finals, London	Hard (i)	RR	3–6, 6–3, 6–3
2012
13.	(Serbia) Novak Djokovic	1	Madrid, Spain	Clay	QF	7–6^{(7–2)}, 6–3
14.	(Czech Republic) Tomáš Berdych	7	World Team Cup, Düsseldorf	Clay	F	7–5, 7–6^{(10–8)}
15.	(Argentina) Juan Mónaco	10	Paris, France	Hard (i)	3R	6–3, 3–6, 6–3

== Awards ==
2002

- Best Male Tennis Player in FR Yugoslavia

2003

- Best Male Tennis Player in FR Yugoslavia

2004

- Best Male Tennis Player in Serbia and Montenegro

2012

- Davis Cup Commitment Award

== Political career ==
In May 2023, four years after the end of his pro tennis career, Tipsarević became a member of the ruling Serbian Progressive Party (SNS) of president Aleksandar Vučić and spoke at an SNS rally on 26 May. He appeared on the list of Serbia Must Not Stop for the 2023 Belgrade City Assembly election and was elected to the City Assembly. Tipsarević was re-elected in the 2024 election.

== Personal life ==
During Tipsarević's professional tennis career, match commentators and press often brought up the player's love of classic literature as something unusual for a high-level athlete. His left arm features a tattooed quotation, in Japanese, from Dostoyevsky's The Idiot ("Beauty will save the world"). He also has a Japanese tattoo on his right arm, representing the first two letters of the names of his father, his mother, his brother, and himself in katakana. According to US Open announcers Ted Robinson and John McEnroe, he also has a tattoo of a quote from Arthur Schopenhauer on his back.

For two months during 2004, Tipsarević dated Serbian television presenter Mila Arsić, four years his senior.

In 2007, he began a relationship with television presenter Biljana Šešević (Биљана Шешевић), one year his senior, reportedly meeting her while being interviewed for a local television program she hosted on the Novi Sad-based Delta TV. The couple announced their engagement following Tipsarević's proposal during a November 2009 vacation on the Maldives. They married on 4 July 2010 in a civil ceremony at the S-Club hospitality venue in Jakovo with 300 guests in attendance, including Tipsarević's Davis Cup teammates Novak Djokovic, Viktor Troicki, and Nenad Zimonjić. The day after the wedding, Tipsarević was off to Split to play in a Davis Cup quarterfinal tie versus Croatia. The couple's first child, a girl Emili, was born on 17 January 2014. They also have a son, Noa, born on 23 May 2020.

In 2015, Tipsarević's sister-in-law Jovana Šešević (his wife's sister) married Tipsarević's coach Rainer Schüttler, another former top 10 player.

Tipsarević enjoys DJing and is also a fan of the football club FC Barcelona. In March 2011, Tipsarević mentioned that he reads the Bible and takes an interest in religion, although he is an atheist.

== See also ==
- Serbia Davis Cup team
- List of Grand Slam boys' singles champions
- ATP World Tour Finals appearances
- List of male tennis players
