= Maharashtra Open =

Indian Tennis championship

TATA Open Maharashtra

Defunct tennis tournament
- Event name: McDowell Open (1996); Gold Flake Open (1997–2001); Tata Open (2002–2004); Chennai Open (2005–2009); Aircel Chennai Open (2010–2017); Tata Open Maharashtra (2018–2023)
- Sponsor: Tata motors
- Founded: 1996; 29 years ago
- Abolished: 2023
- Editions: 27
- Location: Pune; India
- Venue: Balewadi Tennis Complex (2018 — present)
- Category: ATP World Series (1996–1997); ATP International Series (1998–2008); ATP Tour 250 (since 2009)
- Surface: Hard – Outdoors
- Draw: 28S/16Q/16D
- Prize money: US$713,495 (2023)
- Most singles titles: Stan Wawrinka
- Website: maharashtraopen.com

Current champions (2023)
- Singles: (Netherlands) Tallon Griekspoor
- Doubles: (Belgium) Sander Gillé (Belgium) Joran Vliegen
ATP Tour
- Category: ATP 250

The Maharashtra Open, also known as the Tata Open Maharashtra for sponsorship reasons, was an annual men's ATP Tour 250 tennis event held from 1996 until 2023.

The Maharashtra State Lawn Tennis Association (MSLTA), the governing body of Tennis in Maharashtra state, organized annually the hardcourt championship, which included men's singles and doubles events, at the Shree Shiv Chhatrapati Sports Complex or also known as the Balewadi Tennis Complex in Mahalunge, as part of the ATP Tour.

The tournament was owned and organized by RISE Worldwide. It was the only ATP tour-level tennis event held in India. It was also the only South Asia's ATP tour professional tennis event. It was last held in Pune in 2023 (since 2018), before it was moved to Hong Kong in 2024.

== History ==
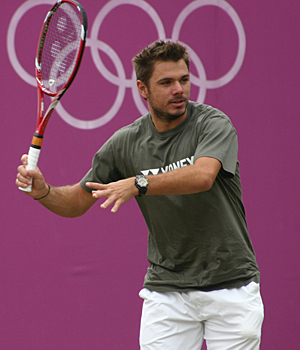
Stan Wawrinka is the most successful player at the event, winning 4 titles (2011, 2014, 2015, and 2016) and reaching a further final (2010).

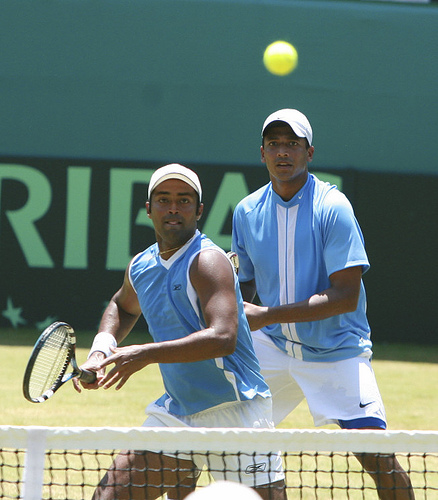
Indian duo of Mahesh Bhupathi and Leander Paes won the doubles titles four times between 1997 and 2002, and again in 2011

The Maharashtra Open was held since 1996. The inaugural event was held in New Delhi, and the second edition in Chennai, where it was held as the Chennai Open. In 2018, the championship moved to Pune, a city of Maharashtra, and was rebranded as the Tata Open Maharashtra.

In 2021 due to COVID-19 and a clash of dates with the Australian Open it was not held.

== Past finals ==
=== Singles ===
Year	Champions	Runners-up	Score
↓ New Delhi ↓
1996	(Sweden) Thomas Enqvist	(Zimbabwe) Byron Black	6–2, 7–6^{(7–3)}
↓ Chennai ↓
1997	(Sweden) Mikael Tillström	(Germany) Alex Rădulescu	6–4, 4–6, 7–5
1998	(Australia) Patrick Rafter	(Sweden) Mikael Tillström	6–3, 6–4
1999	(Zimbabwe) Byron Black	(Germany) Rainer Schüttler	6–4, 1–6, 6–3
2000	(France) Jérôme Golmard	(Germany) Markus Hantschk	6–3, 6–7^{(6–8)}, 6–3
2001	(Czech Republic) Michal Tabara	(Russia) Andrei Stoliarov	6–2, 7–6^{(7–4)}
2002	(Argentina) Guillermo Cañas	(Thailand) Paradorn Srichaphan	6–4, 7–6^{(7–2)}
2003	(Thailand) Paradorn Srichaphan	(Slovakia) Karol Kučera	6–3, 6–1
2004	(Spain) Carlos Moyá	(Thailand) Paradorn Srichaphan	6–4, 3–6, 7–6^{(7–5)}
2005	(Spain) Carlos Moyá (2)	(Thailand) Paradorn Srichaphan	3–6, 6–4, 7–6^{(7–5)}
2006	(Croatia) Ivan Ljubičić	(Spain) Carlos Moyá	7–6^{(8–6)}, 6–2
2007	(Belgium) Xavier Malisse	(Austria) Stefan Koubek	6–1, 6–3
2008	(Russia) Mikhail Youzhny	(Spain) Rafael Nadal	6–0, 6–1
2009	(Croatia) Marin Čilić	(India) Somdev Devvarman	6–4, 7–6^{(7–3)}
2010	(Croatia) Marin Čilić (2)	(Switzerland) Stan Wawrinka	7–6^{(7–2)}, 7–6^{(7–3)}
2011	(Switzerland) Stan Wawrinka	(Belgium) Xavier Malisse	7–5, 4–6, 6–1
2012	(Canada) Milos Raonic	(Serbia) Janko Tipsarević	6–7^{(4–7)}, 7–6^{(7–4)}, 7–6^{(7–4)}
2013	(Serbia) Janko Tipsarević	(Spain) Roberto Bautista Agut	3–6, 6–1, 6–3
2014	(Switzerland) Stan Wawrinka (2)	(France) Édouard Roger-Vasselin	7–5, 6–2
2015	(Switzerland) Stan Wawrinka (3)	(Slovenia) Aljaž Bedene	6–3, 6–4
2016	(Switzerland) Stan Wawrinka (4)	(Croatia) Borna Ćorić	6–3, 7–5
2017	(Spain) Roberto Bautista Agut	(Russia) Daniil Medvedev	6–3, 6–4
↓ Pune ↓
2018	(France) Gilles Simon	(South Africa) Kevin Anderson	7–6^{(7–4)}, 6–2
2019	(South Africa) Kevin Anderson	(Croatia) Ivo Karlović	7–6^{(7–4)}, 6–7^{(2–7)}, 7–6^{(7–5)}
2020	(Czech Republic) Jiří Veselý	(Belarus) Egor Gerasimov	7–6^{(7–2)}, 5–7, 6–3
2021	tournament not held, due to COVID-19 restrictions		
2022	(Portugal) João Sousa	(Finland) Emil Ruusuvuori	7–6^{(11–9)}, 4–6, 6–1
2023	(Netherlands) Tallon Griekspoor	(France) Benjamin Bonzi	4–6, 7–5, 6–3

=== Doubles ===
Year	Champions	Runners-up	Score
↓ New Delhi ↓
1996	(Sweden) Jonas Björkman (Sweden) Nicklas Kulti	(Zimbabwe) Byron Black (Australia) Sandon Stolle	4–6, 6–4, 6–4
↓ Chennai ↓
1997	(India) Mahesh Bhupathi (India) Leander Paes	(Uzbekistan) Oleg Ogorodov (Israel) Eyal Ran	7–6, 7–5
1998	(India) Mahesh Bhupathi (2) (India) Leander Paes (2)	(France) Olivier Delaître (Belarus) Max Mirnyi	6–7, 6–3, 6–2
1999	(India) Mahesh Bhupathi (3) (India) Leander Paes (3)	(Zimbabwe) Wayne Black (South Africa) Neville Godwin	4–6, 7–5, 6–4
2000	(France) Julien Boutter (Belgium) Christophe Rochus	(India) Saurav Panja (India) Prahlad Srinath	7–5, 6–1
2001	(Zimbabwe) Byron Black (Zimbabwe) Wayne Black	(United Kingdom) Barry Cowan (Italy) Mosé Navarra	6–3, 6–4
2002	(India) Mahesh Bhupathi (4) (India) Leander Paes (4)	(Czech Republic) Tomáš Cibulec (Czech Republic) Ota Fukárek	5–7, 6–2, 7–5
2003	(Austria) Julian Knowle (Germany) Michael Kohlmann	(Czech Republic) František Čermák (Czech Republic) Leoš Friedl	7–6^{(7–1)}, 7–6^{(7–3)}
2004	(Spain) Rafael Nadal (Spain) Tommy Robredo	(Israel) Jonathan Erlich (Israel) Andy Ram	7–6^{(7–3)}, 4–6, 6–3
2005	(Chinese Taipei) Lu Yen-hsun (Germany) Rainer Schüttler	(India) Mahesh Bhupathi (Sweden) Jonas Björkman	7–5, 4–6, 7–6^{(7–4)}
2006	(Slovakia) Michal Mertiňák (Czech Republic) Petr Pála	(India) Prakash Amritraj (India) Rohan Bopanna	6–2, 7–5
2007	(Belgium) Xavier Malisse (Belgium) Dick Norman	(Spain) Rafael Nadal (Spain) Bartolomé Salvá-Vidal	7–6^{(7–4)}, 7–6^{(7–4)}
2008	(Thailand) Sanchai Ratiwatana (Thailand) Sonchat Ratiwatana	(Cyprus) Marcos Baghdatis (France) Marc Gicquel	6–4, 7–5
2009	(United States) Eric Butorac (United States) Rajeev Ram	(Switzerland) Jean-Claude Scherrer (Switzerland) Stan Wawrinka	6–3, 6–4
2010	(Spain) Marcel Granollers (Spain) Santiago Ventura	(Chinese Taipei) Lu Yen-hsun (Serbia) Janko Tipsarević	7–5, 6–2
2011	(India) Mahesh Bhupathi (5) (India) Leander Paes (5)	(Netherlands) Robin Haase (United States) David Martin	6–2, 6–7^{(3–7)}, [10–7]
2012	(India) Leander Paes (6) (Serbia) Janko Tipsarević	(Israel) Jonathan Erlich (Israel) Andy Ram	6–4, 6–4
2013	(France) Benoît Paire (Switzerland) Stanislas Wawrinka	(Germany) Andre Begemann (Germany) Martin Emmrich	6–2, 6–1
2014	(Sweden) Johan Brunström (Denmark) Frederik Nielsen	(Croatia) Marin Draganja (Croatia) Mate Pavić	6–2, 4–6, [10–7]
2015	(Chinese Taipei) Lu Yen-hsun (2) (United Kingdom) Jonathan Marray	(South Africa) Raven Klaasen (India) Leander Paes	6–3, 7–6^{(7–4)}
2016	(Austria) Oliver Marach (France) Fabrice Martin	(United States) Austin Krajicek (France) Benoît Paire	6–3, 7–5
2017	(India) Rohan Bopanna (India) Jeevan Nedunchezhiyan	(India) Purav Raja (India) Divij Sharan	6–3, 6–4
↓ Pune ↓
2018	(Netherlands) Robin Haase (Netherlands) Matwé Middelkoop	(France) Pierre-Hugues Herbert (France) Gilles Simon	7–6^{(7–5)}, 7–6^{(7–5)}
2019	(India) Rohan Bopanna (2) (India) Divij Sharan	(United Kingdom) Luke Bambridge (United Kingdom) Jonny O'Mara	6–3, 6–4
2020	(Sweden) André Göransson (Indonesia) Christopher Rungkat	(Israel) Jonathan Erlich (Belarus) Andrei Vasilevski	6–2, 3–6, [10–8]
2021	tournament not held, due to COVID-19 restrictions		
2022	(India) Rohan Bopanna (3) (India) Ramkumar Ramanathan	(Australia) Luke Saville (Australia) John-Patrick Smith	6–7^{(10–12)}, 6–3, [10–6]
2023	(Belgium) Sander Gillé (Belgium) Joran Vliegen	(India) Sriram Balaji (India) Jeevan Nedunchezhiyan	6–4, 6–4

== Sponsors ==
- Tata motors (Title sponsor)
- MMRDA
- 1xBat
- Panchshil
- Dunlop
- Indian tree (apparel partner)
- IMG

Source -

== Television broadcast ==
Maharashtra Open is live and exclusively airs on Sports 18 HD channel and live streams on Jio cinema app in India.

== See also ==
- Sports in India
- WTA Indian Open
