= 2019 in Indian sport =

2019 in Indian sports describes the year's events in Indian sport.

== Events ==
=== International events ===
- 16 November 2018 – 10 February 2019 – 2018–19 MRF Challenge Formula 2000 Championship event finished in Chennai.
- 31 December 2018 – 5 January 2019 – 2019 Maharashtra Open held in Pune. Rohan Bopanna and Divij Sharan won the doubles event.
- 4–10 February – 2019 Chennai Open Challenger, Chennai.
- 27 February – 3 March 2019 Indian Open Snooker, Kochi.
- 26–31 March – 2019 India Open Badminton, New Delhi.
- 6–15 June 2019 – 2018–19 Men's FIH Hockey Series Finals in Bhubaneswar. India won gold medal.
- 12–28 July – India participated in the 2019 World Aquatics Championships.
- 6–11 August – 2019 Hyderabad Open Badminton, Hyderabad. Sourabh Verma wins in men's singles.
- 27 September – 6 October – India participated in the 2019 World Athletics Championships.
- 18–27 October – India participated in the 2019 Military World Games.
- 11–17 November – 019 KPIT MSLTA Challenger Tennis, Pune. Purav Raja and Ramkumar Ramanathan won the doubles event.
- 26 November – 1 December – 2019 Syed Modi International, Lucknow.
- 1–10 December – India participated in the 2019 South Asian Games.
- 12–21 December – India participated in the 2019 Winter Deaflympics.

== Sports Leagues in 2019 ==
=== Domestic leagues ===
League	Duration	Participation	Seasons	Winner/s
Premier Badminton League	December 2018 – January 2019	8 Clubs	Season 4	Bengaluru Raptors
I League	26 October 2018 – March 2019	10 Clubs	Season 12	Chennai City
Pro Volleyball League	2 February – 22 February	6 Clubs	Season 1	Chennai Spartans
Irani Cup	12 February – 16 February	2 Clubs	Season 57	Vidarbha
Syed Mushtaq Ali Trophy	21 February – 14 March	37 Clubs	Season 10	Karnataka
Indian Premier League	23 March – 12 May	8 Clubs	Season 12	Mumbai Indians
T20 Mumbai League	14 May – 26 May	8 Clubs	Season 2	North Mumbai Panthers
Tamil Nadu Premier League	19 July – 1 August	8 Clubs	Season 4	Chepauk Super Gillies
Karnataka Premier League	16 August – 31 August	7 Clubs	Season 8	Hubli Tigers
Duleep Trophy	17 August – 8 September	3 Clubs	Season 58	India Red
Pro Kabaddi League	20 July – 19 October	12 Clubs	Season 7	Bengal Warriors
Vijay Hazare Trophy	24 September – 25 October	38 Clubs	Season 18	Karnataka
Deodhar Trophy	31 October – 4 November 2019	3 Clubs	Season 47	India B
Indian Super League	20 October 2019 – 8 March 2020	10 Clubs	Season 6	ATK
Ranji Trophy	9 December 2019 – 13 March 2020	38 Clubs	Season 86	Saurashtra
