= 2018 in Indian sport =

2018 in Indian sports describes the year's events in Indian sport. The main highlight for this year for India is the 2018 Winter Olympics in Pyeongchang and the 2018 Commonwealth Games in Gold Coast.

== Calendar by month ==
=== March ===
Date	Sport	Venue/Event	Status	Winner/s
Field Hockey	2018 Sultan Azlan Shah Cup	Annual International hockey tournament	International	India beat Ireland by 4–1 in fifth place
31 – 20 April	Association football	2018 Indian Super Cup	Domestic	Bengaluru FC

=== April ===
Date	Sport	Venue/Event	Status	Winner/s
7 – 27 May	Cricket	2018 Indian Premier League	Domestic League	Chennai Super Kings

=== June ===
Date	Sport	Venue/Event	Status	Winner/s
22–30 June	Kabaddi	Al Wasl Sports Club/2018 Dubai Kabaddi Masters	6 Nation international series	India

=== August ===
Date	Sport	Venue/Event	Status	Winner/s
22–26 August	Carrom	Chuncheon/2018 Carrom World Cup	women's team	India

== Sports Leagues in 2018 ==
=== Domestic leagues ===
League	Duration	Participation	Seasons	Winner/s
Premier Badminton League	23 December 2017 – 14 January 2018	8 Clubs	Season 4	Hyderabad Hunters
Pro Wrestling League	9 January – 26 January	6 Clubs	Season 3	Punjab Royals
I League	25 November 2017 – 8 March 2018	10 Clubs	Season 11	Minerva Punjab
T20 Mumbai League	11 March – 21 March	6 Clubs	Season 1	Triumph Knights Mumbai North East
Indian Premier League	7 April – 27 May	8 Clubs	Season 11	Chennai Super Kings
Tamil Nadu Premier League	11 July – 12 August	8 Clubs	Season 3	Siechem Madurai Panthers
Karnataka Premier League	15 August – 6 September	7 Clubs	Season 7	Bijapur Bulls
Pro Kabaddi League	7 October 2018 – 5 January 2019	12 Clubs	Season 6	Bengaluru Bulls
Duleep Trophy	17 August – 9 September	3 Clubs	Season 57	India Blue
Indian Super League	29 September 2018 – 17 March 2019	10 clubs	Season 5	Bengaluru FC
Premier Badminton League	22 December 2018 – 13 January 2019	9 clubs	Season 5	Bengaluru Raptors

== Multi-sport events ==
Event	Medals			Report
Event	Gold medal	Silver medal	Bronze medal	Report
2018 Winter Olympics	0	0	0	Report
2018 Commonwealth Games	26	20	20	Report
2018 Asian Games	15	24	30	Report
Total	41	44	50	

=== Year highlights ===
- Vidarbha beat Delhi by 9 wickets to win their maiden Ranji Trophy.
- Chennai Super Kings, under the captainship of Mahendra Singh Dhoni, won the Indian Premier League(IPL) 2018 against Hyderabad Sunrisers and won the championship in their comeback after 2 years.
- Hyderabad Hunters defeat Bengaluru Blasters 4–3 to claim their maiden Premier Badminton League title.
- India national blind cricket team claimed the 2018 Blind Cricket World Cup title by defeating Pakistan in the finals by 2 wickets.
- Indian national cricket team won the ODI Series against South Africa in South Africa in first in History.
- India national under-19 cricket team won the 2018 Under-19 Cricket World Cup held in New Zealand beating Australia in the Final.
- India competed in 2016 Pyeongchang Winter Olympics & Paralympics respectively.
- India competed at the 2018 Commonwealth Games Held in Gold Coast Australia and bagged 26 Golds, 20 Silvers and 20 Bronze Medals.
- India competed at the 2018 Asian Games held in Jakarta-Palembang, Indonesia and bagged 15 Gold, 24 Silver and 30 Bronze Medals.
- India defeated Iran 44–26 in the final to clinch the inaugural edition of the Dubai Kabaddi Masters tournament title.
