= 2018 Tata Open Maharashtra =

- Date: 1–6 January 2018
- Edition: 23rd
- Category: World Tour 250
- Draw: 28S / 16D
- Prize money: $501,345
- Surface: Hard / outdoor
- Location: Pune, India

Champions

Singles
- (France) Gilles Simon

Doubles
- (Netherlands) Robin Haase / (Netherlands) Matwé Middelkoop
| ← 2017 · | Maharashtra Open | · 2019 → |

The 2018 Tata Open Maharashtra was a men's tennis tournament played on outdoor hard courts that was part of the World Tour 250 series of the 2018 ATP World Tour. It was the 23rd edition of the only ATP tournament played in India and took place in Pune, India, from 1 January through 6 January 2018. It was the first edition of the tournament to be held after it was moved from Chennai to Pune. Unseeded Gilles Simon won the singles title.

== Finals ==
=== Singles ===
- (France) Gilles Simon defeated (South Africa) Kevin Anderson, 7–6^{(7–4)}, 6–2

=== Doubles ===
- (Netherlands) Robin Haase / (Netherlands) Matwé Middelkoop defeated (France) Pierre-Hugues Herbert / (France) Gilles Simon, 7–6^{(7–5)}, 7–6^{(7–5)}

== Points and prize money ==
=== Point distribution ===
| Event | W | F | SF | QF | Round of 16 | Round of 32 | Q | Q2 | Q1 |
| Singles | 250 | 150 | 90 | 45 | 20 | 0 | 12 | 6 | 0 |
| Doubles | 250 | 150 | 90 | 45 | 0 | — | — | — | — |

=== Prize money ===
| Event | W | F | SF | QF | Round of 16 | Round of 32 | Q2 | Q1 |
| Singles | $89,435 | $47,105 | $25,515 | $14,535 | $8,565 | $5,075 | $2,285 | $1,145 |
| Doubles | $27,170 | $14,280 | $7,740 | $4,430 | $2,590 | — | — | — |
Doubles prize money per team

== ATP singles main-draw entrants ==
=== Seeds ===
| Country | Player | Rank^{1} | Seed |
|---|---|---|---|
| CRO | Marin Čilić | 6 | 1 |
| RSA | Kevin Anderson | 14 | 2 |
| ESP | Roberto Bautista Agut | 20 | 3 |
| FRA | Benoît Paire | 41 | 4 |
| NED | Robin Haase | 42 | 5 |
| CZE | Jiří Veselý | 62 | 6 |
| KAZ | Mikhail Kukushkin | 74 | 7 |
| FRA | Pierre-Hugues Herbert | 81 | 8 |

- ^{1} Rankings as of 25 December 2017

=== Other entrants ===
The following players received wildcards into the singles main draw:

- (India) Arjun Kadhe
- (France) Benoît Paire
- (India) Ramkumar Ramanathan

The following players received entry using a protected ranking:

- (Spain) Pablo Andújar

The following players received entry from the qualifying draw:

- (Belarus) Ilya Ivashka
- (Brazil) Thiago Monteiro
- (India) Sumit Nagal
- (Spain) Ricardo Ojeda Lara

=== Withdrawals ===
Before the tournament

- (France) Jérémy Chardy →replaced by (Spain) Pablo Andújar
- (Brazil) Rogério Dutra Silva →replaced by (Italy) Marco Cecchinato
- (Croatia) Ivo Karlović →replaced by (India) Yuki Bhambri
- (Slovakia) Lukáš Lacko →replaced by (Spain) Roberto Carballés Baena
- (Chinese Taipei) Lu Yen-hsun →replaced by (Belgium) Ruben Bemelmans

=== Retirements ===
- (Brazil) Thiago Monteiro

== ATP doubles main-draw entrants ==
=== Seeds ===
| Country | Player | Country | Player | Rank^{1} | Seed |
|---|---|---|---|---|---|
| SWE | Robert Lindstedt | CRO | Franko Škugor | 114 | 1 |
| NED | Robin Haase | NED | Matwé Middelkoop | 117 | 2 |
| CHI | Hans Podlipnik Castillo | BLR | Andrei Vasilevski | 119 | 3 |
| IND | Rohan Bopanna | IND | Jeevan Nedunchezhiyan | 120 | 4 |

- ^{1} Rankings are as of 25 December 2017.

=== Other entrants ===
The following pairs received wildcards into the doubles main draw:

- (India) Sriram Balaji / (India) Vishnu Vardhan
- (India) Arjun Kadhe / (France) Benoît Paire
