= 2018 Tata Open Maharashtra – Singles =

Singles
- 2018 Tata Open Maharashtra

Final
- Champion: (France) Gilles Simon
- Runner-up: (South Africa) Kevin Anderson
- Score: 7–6^{(7–4)}, 6–2

Details
- Draw: 28 (4 Q / 3 WC )
- Seeds: 8

Events
Singles	Doubles
← 2017 ·	Maharashtra Open	· 2019 →

Roberto Bautista Agut was the defending champion, but lost in the second round to Gilles Simon.

Simon went on to win the title, defeating Kevin Anderson in the final, 7–6^{(7–4)}, 6–2.

== Seeds ==
The top four seeds receive a bye into the second round.

1. (Croatia) Marin Čilić (semifinals)
2. (South Africa) Kevin Anderson (final)
3. (Spain) Roberto Bautista Agut (second round)
4. (France) Benoît Paire (semifinals)
5. (Netherlands) Robin Haase (quarterfinals)
6. (Czech Republic) Jiří Veselý (first round)
7. (Kazakhstan) Mikhail Kukushkin (quarterfinals)
8. (France) Pierre-Hugues Herbert (quarterfinals)

== Draw ==
=== Finals ===
Semifinals
1	(Croatia) Marin Čilić	6	3	2
(France) Gilles Simon	1	6	6
4/WC	(France) Benoît Paire	7^{8}	6^{2}	1
2	(South Africa) Kevin Anderson	6^{6}	7^{7}	6

Final
(France) Gilles Simon	7^{7}	6
2	(South Africa) Kevin Anderson	6^{4}	2

=== Top half ===
First round
WC	(India) R Ramanathan	7^{7}	6
(Spain) R Carballés Baena	6^{4}	2
(India) Y Bhambri	6	6
WC	(India) A Kadhe	3	4
(Italy) M Cecchinato	6^{4}	7^{8}	2
8	(France) P-H Herbert	7^{7}	6^{6}	6
(France) G Simon	6	6
(United States) T Sandgren	4	1
Q	(India) S Nagal	3	3
Q	(Belarus) I Ivashka	6	6
Q	(Spain) R Ojeda Lara	6	7^{7}
6	(Czech Republic) J Veselý	3	6^{5}

Second round
1	(Croatia) M Čilić	6	6
WC	(India) R Ramanathan	4	3
(India) Y Bhambri	6	3	4
8	(France) P-H Herbert	4	6	6
3	(Spain) R Bautista Agut	3	6^{5}
(France) G Simon	6	7^{7}
Q	(Belarus) I Ivashka	4	4
Q	(Spain) R Ojeda Lara	6	6

Quarterfinals
1	(Croatia) M Čilić	6	6
8	(France) P-H Herbert	3	2
(France) G Simon	6	6
Q	(Spain) R Ojeda Lara	2	3

Semifinals
1	(Croatia) M Čilić	6	3	2
(France) G Simon	1	6	6

=== Bottom half ===
First round
5	(Netherlands) R Haase	7^{8}	7
(Slovenia) B Kavčič	6^{6}	5
(Chile) N Jarry	6^{4}	6	7
PR	(Spain) P Andújar	7^{7}	4	5
(Argentina) N Kicker	0	3
(Hungary) M Fucsovics	6	6
7	(Kazakhstan) M Kukushkin	6	7^{7}
(Moldova) R Albot	2	6^{4}
(Serbia) L Đere	5	6	7
(Romania) M Copil	7	4	5
Q	(Brazil) T Monteiro	6^{4}	6	7^{10}
(Belgium) R Bemelmans	7^{7}	3	6^{8}

Second round
5	(Netherlands) R Haase	3	7^{7}	7
(Chile) N Jarry	6	6^{5}	5
(Hungary) M Fucsovics	4	7^{7}	6^{6}
4/WC	(France) B Paire	6	6^{4}	7^{8}
7	(Kazakhstan) M Kukushkin	7	7^{7}
(Serbia) L Đere	5	6^{5}
Q	(Brazil) T Monteiro	6^{4}	2^{r}
2	(South Africa) K Anderson	7^{7}	3

Quarterfinals
5	(Netherlands) R Haase	5	6	3
4/WC	(France) B Paire	7	2	6
7	(Kazakhstan) M Kukushkin	7^{7}	4	2
2	(South Africa) K Anderson	6^{3}	6	6

Semifinals
4/WC	(France) B Paire	7^{8}	6^{2}	1
2	(South Africa) K Anderson	6^{6}	7^{7}	6

== Qualifying ==
=== Seeds ===
1. (Brazil) Thiago Monteiro (qualified)
2. (Spain) Adrián Menéndez Maceiras (qualifying competition)
3. (South Korea) Kwon Soon-woo (first round)
4. (Spain) Carlos Taberner (qualifying competition)
5. (Spain) Ricardo Ojeda Lara (qualified)
6. (India) Sumit Nagal (qualified)
7. (Belarus) Ilya Ivashka (qualified)
8. (India) Prajnesh Gunneswaran (qualifying competition)

=== Qualifiers ===
1. (Brazil) Thiago Monteiro
2. (India) Sumit Nagal
3. (Spain) Ricardo Ojeda Lara
4. (Belarus) Ilya Ivashka

=== Qualifying draw ===
==== First qualifier ====
First round
1	(Brazil) Thiago Monteiro	3	6	7
(India) Sriram Balaji	6	3	5
Alt	(India) Jayesh Pungliya	4	1
8	(India) Prajnesh Gunneswaran	6	6

Qualifying competition
1	(Brazil) Thiago Monteiro	7	7
8	(India) Prajnesh Gunneswaran	5	5

==== Second qualifier ====
First round
2	(Spain) Adrián Menéndez Maceiras	6	6
WC	(India) Shahbaaz Khan	2	0
WC	(India) Divij Sharan	2	3
6	(India) Sumit Nagal	6	6

Qualifying competition
2	(Spain) Adrián Menéndez Maceiras	2	6	4
6	(India) Sumit Nagal	6	3	6

==== Third qualifier ====
First round
3	(South Korea) Kwon Soon-woo	6	3	6^{4}
(Brazil) João Souza	4	6	7^{7}
(India) Sasikumar Mukund	2	1
5	(Spain) Ricardo Ojeda Lara	6	6

Qualifying competition
(Brazil) João Souza	3	4
5	(Spain) Ricardo Ojeda Lara	6	6

==== Fourth qualifier ====
First round
4	(Spain) Carlos Taberner	5	6	7^{7}
(India) Vishnu Vardhan	7	2	6^{3}
(Croatia) Franko Škugor	3	3
7	(Belarus) Ilya Ivashka	6	6

Qualifying competition
4	(Spain) Carlos Taberner	3	2
7	(Belarus) Ilya Ivashka	6	6
