= 2020 Tata Open Maharashtra – Singles =

Singles
- 2020 Tata Open Maharashtra

Final
- Champion: (Czech Republic) Jiří Veselý
- Runner-up: (Belarus) Egor Gerasimov
- Score: 7–6^{(7–2)}, 5–7, 6–3

Details
- Draw: 28 (4 Q / 3 WC )
- Seeds: 8

Events
Singles	Doubles
← 2019 ·	Maharashtra Open	· 2022 →

Kevin Anderson was the defending champion, but chose not to participate this year.

Jiří Veselý won the title, defeating Egor Gerasimov in the final, 7–6^{(7–2)}, 5–7, 6–3.

Jiří Veselý saved 6 match points en route to the title – 2 match points against Ilya Ivashka in quarterfinal and 4 match points against Ričardas Berankis in semifinal.

== Seeds ==
The top four seeds receive a bye into the second round.

1. (France) Benoît Paire (second round)
2. (Lithuania) Ričardas Berankis (semifinals)
3. (Italy) Stefano Travaglia (second round)
4. (South Korea) Kwon Soon-woo (quarterfinals)
5. (Japan) Yūichi Sugita (quarterfinals)
6. (Australia) James Duckworth (semifinals)
7. (Italy) Salvatore Caruso (second round)
8. (Belarus) Egor Gerasimov (final)

== Draw ==
=== Finals ===
Semifinals
6	(Australia) James Duckworth	6^{2}	4
8	(Belarus) Egor Gerasimov	7^{7}	6
(Czech Republic) Jiří Veselý	6^{8}	7^{7}	7^{9}
2	(Lithuania) Ričardas Berankis	7^{10}	6^{3}	6^{7}

Final
8	(Belarus) Egor Gerasimov	6^{2}	7	3
(Czech Republic) Jiří Veselý	7^{7}	5	6

=== Top half ===
First round
Q	(Czech Republic) L Rosol	3	2
Q	(Italy) R Marcora	6	6
(Japan) T Daniel	6	7^{9}
WC	(India) S Mukund	2	6^{7}
(Germany) P Gojowczyk	6^{5}	4
6	(Australia) J Duckworth	7^{7}	6
(India) P Gunneswaran	7^{7}	7^{7}
(Germany) Y Maden	6^{4}	6^{5}
Q	(Serbia) N Milojević	7^{7}	6
(France) A Hoang	6^{5}	4
(Italy) P Lorenzi	2	3
8	(Belarus) E Gerasimov	6	6

Second round
1	(France) B Paire	4	4
Q	(Italy) R Marcora	6	6
(Japan) T Daniel	7^{7}	6^{6}	3
6	(Australia) J Duckworth	6^{4}	7^{8}	6
4	(South Korea) S-w Kwon	6	7^{7}
(India) P Gunneswaran	3	6^{5}
Q	(Serbia) N Milojević	6	3	2
8	(Belarus) E Gerasimov	2	6	6

Quarterfinals
Q	(Italy) R Marcora	3	6^{4}
6	(Australia) J Duckworth	6	7^{7}
4	(South Korea) S-w Kwon	6	6^{1}	4
8	(Belarus) E Gerasimov	4	7^{7}	6

Semifinals
6	(Australia) J Duckworth	6^{2}	4
8	(Belarus) E Gerasimov	7^{7}	6

=== Bottom half ===
First round
7	(Italy) S Caruso	3	6	7
WC	(India) R Ramanathan	6	4	5
WC	(India) A Kadhe	2	4
(Czech Republic) J Veselý	6	6
(Belarus) I Ivashka	6	6
(Russia) E Donskoy	3	2
5	(Japan) Y Sugita	6	6
(Italy) T Fabbiano	3	0
(India) S Nagal	2	7^{7}	1
Q	(Serbia) V Troicki	6	6^{4}	6
PR	(Germany) C-M Stebe	6	6
(Croatia) I Karlović	3	4

Second round
7	(Italy) S Caruso	6^{5}	4
(Czech Republic) J Veselý	7^{7}	6
(Belarus) I Ivashka	7^{7}	7^{7}
3	(Italy) S Travaglia	6^{5}	6^{3}
5	(Japan) Y Sugita	w/o
Q	(Serbia) V Troicki
PR	(Germany) C-M Stebe	6^{2}	1
2	(Lithuania) R Berankis	7^{7}	6

Quarterfinals
(Czech Republic) J Veselý	2	6	7^{13}
(Belarus) I Ivashka	6	1	6^{11}
5	(Japan) Y Sugita	6	6^{4}	2
2	(Lithuania) R Berankis	4	7^{7}	6

Semifinals
(Czech Republic) J Veselý	6^{8}	7^{7}	7^{9}
2	(Lithuania) R Berankis	7^{10}	6^{3}	6^{7}

== Qualifying ==
=== Seeds ===
1. (China) Zhang Zhizhen (first round)
2. (Slovenia) Blaž Rola (qualifying competition)
3. (Belarus) Ilya Ivashka (moved to main draw)
4. (Serbia) Nikola Milojević (qualified)
5. (Serbia) Viktor Troicki (qualified)
6. (Netherlands) Robin Haase (qualifying competition)
7. (Italy) Roberto Marcora (qualified)
8. (Czech Republic) Lukáš Rosol (qualified)

=== Qualifiers ===
1. (Czech Republic) Lukáš Rosol
2. (Italy) Roberto Marcora
3. (Serbia) Viktor Troicki
4. (Serbia) Nikola Milojević

=== Qualifying draw ===
==== First qualifier ====
First round
1	(China) Zhang Zhizhen	3	2
(Australia) Matthew Ebden	6	6
WC	(Latvia) Ernests Gulbis	4	4
8	(Czech Republic) Lukáš Rosol	6	6

Qualifying competition
(Australia) Matthew Ebden	2	5
8	(Czech Republic) Lukáš Rosol	6	7

==== Second qualifier ====
First round
2	(Slovenia) Blaž Rola	6^{5}	7^{8}	7^{7}
(Tunisia) Malek Jaziri	7^{7}	6^{6}	6^{2}
(Italy) Filippo Baldi	3	2
7	(Italy) Roberto Marcora	6	6

Qualifying competition
2	(Slovenia) Blaž Rola	4	6^{4}
7	(Italy) Roberto Marcora	6	7^{7}

==== Third qualifier ====
First round
Alt	(Russia) Aslan Karatsev	6	4	4
(Russia) Evgeny Karlovskiy	4	6	6
(Spain) Nicola Kuhn	1	4
5	(Serbia) Viktor Troicki	6	6

Qualifying competition
(Russia) Evgeny Karlovskiy	2	4
5	(Serbia) Viktor Troicki	6	6

==== Fourth qualifier ====
First round
4	(Serbia) Nikola Milojević	6	6
WC	(India) Saketh Myneni	3	2
(Portugal) Frederico Ferreira Silva	6	6^{5}	4
6	(Netherlands) Robin Haase	3	7^{7}	6

Qualifying competition
4	(Serbia) Nikola Milojević	6	6
6	(Netherlands) Robin Haase	3	3
