= 2019 Tata Open Maharashtra – Doubles =

Doubles
- 2019 Tata Open Maharashtra

Final
- Champions: (India) Rohan Bopanna (India) Divij Sharan
- Runners-up: (United Kingdom) Luke Bambridge (United Kingdom) Jonny O'Mara
- Score: 6–3, 6–4

Details
- Draw: 16
- Seeds: 4

Events
Singles	Doubles
← 2018 ·	Maharashtra Open	· 2020 →

Robin Haase and Matwé Middelkoop were the defending champions, but chose to compete in Doha instead.

Rohan Bopanna and Divij Sharan won the title, defeating Luke Bambridge and Jonny O'Mara in the final, 6–3, 6–4.

== Seeds ==
1. (India) Rohan Bopanna / (India) Divij Sharan (champions)
2. (Austria) Philipp Oswald / (Germany) Tim Pütz (first round)
3. (El Salvador) Marcelo Arévalo / (United States) James Cerretani (first round)
4. (Spain) Gerard Granollers / (Spain) Marcel Granollers (semifinals)

== Draw ==
=== Key ===
- Q = Qualifier
- WC = Wild card
- LL = Lucky loser
- Alt = Alternate
- SE = Special exempt
- PR = Protected ranking
- ITF = ITF entry
- JE = Junior exempt
- w/o = Walkover
- r = Retired
- d = Defaulted
- SR = Special ranking

=== Draw ===
First round
1	(India) R Bopanna (India) D Sharan	6	6
(Moldova) R Albot (Tunisia) M Jaziri	1	2
(India) L Paes (Mexico) MÁ Reyes-Varela	6	6
(Spain) D Marrero (Chile) H Podlipnik Castillo	3	4
3	(El Salvador) M Arévalo (United States) J Cerretani	6	5	[7]
(Italy) S Bolelli (Croatia) I Dodig	4	7	[10]
(Germany) K Krawietz (Germany) A Mies	7	6
(Poland) H Hurkacz (France) B Paire	5	3
(Ukraine) D Molchanov (Slovakia) I Zelenay	6	6
(Spain) P Andújar (Spain) R Carballés Baena	1	4
(United States) N Monroe (India) J Nedunchezhiyan	4	4
4	(Spain) G Granollers (Spain) M Granollers	6	6
(United Kingdom) L Bambridge (United Kingdom) J O'Mara	7^{7}	6
WC	(India) P Raja (India) R Ramanathan	6^{4}	3
WC	(India) S Balaji (India) A Kadhe	7^{7}	4	[10]
2	(Austria) P Oswald (Germany) T Pütz	6^{1}	6	[8]

Quarterfinals
1	(India) R Bopanna (India) D Sharan	6^{4}	6	[17]
(India) L Paes (Mexico) MÁ Reyes-Varela	7^{7}	4	[15]
(Italy) S Bolelli (Croatia) I Dodig	6	6
(Germany) K Krawietz (Germany) A Mies	2	4
(Ukraine) D Molchanov (Slovakia) I Zelenay	4	7^{7}	[6]
4	(Spain) G Granollers (Spain) M Granollers	6	6^{3}	[10]
(United Kingdom) L Bambridge (United Kingdom) J O'Mara	7^{7}	6
WC	(India) S Balaji (India) A Kadhe	6^{5}	1

Semifinals
1	(India) R Bopanna (India) D Sharan	6	3	[15]
(Italy) S Bolelli (Croatia) I Dodig	3	6	[13]
4	(Spain) G Granollers (Spain) M Granollers	4	6	[6]
(United Kingdom) L Bambridge (United Kingdom) J O'Mara	6	3	[10]

Final
1	(India) R Bopanna (India) D Sharan	6	6
(United Kingdom) L Bambridge (United Kingdom) J O'Mara	3	4
