= 2019 Tata Open Maharashtra =

- Date: 31 December 2018 – 5 January 2019
- Edition: 24th
- Category: ATP Tour 250
- Draw: 28S / 16D
- Prize money: $527,880
- Surface: Hard / outdoor
- Location: Pune, India
- Venue: Mhalunge Balewadi Tennis Complex

Champions

Singles
- (South Africa) Kevin Anderson

Doubles
- (India) Rohan Bopanna / (India) Divij Sharan
| ← 2018 · | Maharashtra Open | · 2020 → |

The 2019 Tata Open Maharashtra was a 2019 ATP Tour men's tennis tournament played on outdoor hard courts. It was the 24th edition of the only ATP tournament played in India and took place in Pune, India, from 31 December 2018 through 5 January 2019. First-seeded Kevin Anderson won the singles title.

== Finals ==
=== Singles ===
- (South Africa) Kevin Anderson defeated (Croatia) Ivo Karlović, 7–6^{(7–4)}, 6–7^{(2–7)}, 7–6^{(7–5)}

=== Doubles ===
- (India) Rohan Bopanna / (India) Divij Sharan defeated (United Kingdom) Luke Bambridge / (United Kingdom) Jonny O'Mara, 6–3, 6–4

== Singles main-draw entrants ==
=== Seeds ===
| Country | Player | Rank^{1} | Seed |
|---|---|---|---|
| RSA | Kevin Anderson | 6 | 1 |
| KOR | Chung Hyeon | 25 | 2 |
| FRA | Gilles Simon | 30 | 3 |
| TUN | Malek Jaziri | 45 | 4 |
| FRA | Benoît Paire | 52 | 5 |
| ESP | Roberto Carballés Baena | 73 | 6 |
| ESP | Jaume Munar | 81 | 7 |
| ESP | Pablo Andújar | 83 | 8 |

- ^{1} Rankings as of 24 December 2018

=== Other entrants ===
The following players received wildcards into the singles main draw:

- (India) Prajnesh Gunneswaran
- (India) Arjun Kadhe
- (India) Ramkumar Ramanathan

The following player received entry using a protected ranking into the singles main draw:

- (Belgium) Steve Darcis

The following players received entry from the qualifying draw:

- (Canada) Félix Auger-Aliassime
- (Italy) Simone Bolelli
- (France) Antoine Hoang
- ~~(India) Saketh Myneni~~

The following player received entry as lucky loser:

- (Brazil) Thiago Monteiro

=== Withdrawals ===
Before the tournament

- (Croatia) Marin Čilić → replaced by (Portugal) Pedro Sousa
- (India) Saketh Myneni → replaced by (Brazil) Thiago Monteiro

== Doubles main-draw entrants ==
=== Seeds ===
| Country | Player | Country | Player | Rank^{1} | Seed |
|---|---|---|---|---|---|
| IND | Rohan Bopanna | IND | Divij Sharan | 76 | 1 |
| AUT | Philipp Oswald | GER | Tim Pütz | 112 | 2 |
| ESA | Marcelo Arévalo | USA | James Cerretani | 115 | 3 |
| ESP | Gerard Granollers | ESP | Marcel Granollers | 117 | 4 |

- ^{1} Rankings are as of 24 December 2018.

=== Other entrants ===
The following pairs received wildcards into the doubles main draw:

- (India) Sriram Balaji / (India) Arjun Kadhe
- (India) Purav Raja / (India) Ramkumar Ramanathan
