= 2020 Tata Open Maharashtra =

- Date: 3–9 February 2020
- Edition: 25th
- Draw: 28S / 16D
- Surface: Hard / outdoor
- Location: Pune, India
- Venue: Mhalunge Balewadi Tennis Complex

Champions

Singles
- (Czech Republic) Jiří Veselý

Doubles
- (Sweden) André Göransson / (Indonesia) Christopher Rungkat
← 2019 ·	Maharashtra Open	· 2022 →

The 2020 Tata Open Maharashtra was a 2020 ATP Tour tennis tournament played on outdoor hard courts. It was the 25th edition of the only ATP tournament played in India and took place in Pune, India, from 3 February through 9 February 2020. Unseeded Jiří Veselý won the singles title.

== Finals ==
=== Singles ===
- (Czech Republic) Jiří Veselý defeated (Belarus) Egor Gerasimov, 7–6^{(7–2)}, 5–7, 6–3

=== Doubles ===
- (Sweden) André Göransson / (Indonesia) Christopher Rungkat defeated (Israel) Jonathan Erlich / (Belarus) Andrei Vasilevski, 6–2, 3–6, [10–8]

== Singles main-draw entrants ==
=== Seeds ===
Country	Player	Rank^{1}	Seed
FRA	Benoît Paire	21	1
LTU	Ričardas Berankis	69	2
ITA	Stefano Travaglia	74	3
KOR	Kwon Soon-woo	87	4
JPN	Yūichi Sugita	91	5
AUS	James Duckworth	94	6
ITA	Salvatore Caruso	95	7
BLR	Egor Gerasimov	98	8

- ^{1} Rankings as of 20 January 2020

=== Other entrants ===
The following players received wildcards into the singles main draw:

- (India) Arjun Kadhe
- (India) Sasikumar Mukund
- (India) Ramkumar Ramanathan

The following player received entry using a protected ranking into the singles main draw:

- (Germany) Cedrik-Marcel Stebe

The following players received entry from the qualifying draw:

- (Italy) Roberto Marcora
- (Serbia) Nikola Milojević
- (Czech Republic) Lukáš Rosol
- (Serbia) Viktor Troicki

=== Withdrawals ===
Before the tournament

- (Germany) Philipp Kohlschreiber → replaced by (Belarus) Ilya Ivashka
- (Poland) Kamil Majchrzak → replaced by (India) Prajnesh Gunneswaran

During the tournament

- (Serbia) Viktor Troicki

== Doubles main-draw entrants ==
=== Seeds ===
Country	Player	Country	Player	Rank^{1}	Seed
NED	Robin Haase	SWE	Robert Lindstedt	107	1
IND	Divij Sharan	NZL	Artem Sitak	115	2
ISR	Jonathan Erlich	BLR	Andrei Vasilevski	143	3
TPE	Hsieh Cheng-peng	UKR	Denys Molchanov	152	4

- ^{1} Rankings are as of 20 January 2020.

=== Other entrants ===
The following pairs received wildcards into the doubles main draw:

- (Australia) Matthew Ebden / (India) Leander Paes
- (India) Rohan Bopanna / (India) Arjun Kadhe

The following pair received entry as alternates:

- (Belarus) Egor Gerasimov / (India) Sumit Nagal

=== Withdrawal ===
Before the tournament

- (Germany) Peter Gojowczyk (hip injury)
