= 2018 Tata Open Maharashtra – Doubles =

Doubles
- 2018 Tata Open Maharashtra

Final
- Champions: (Netherlands) Robin Haase; (Netherlands) Matwé Middelkoop
- Runners-up: (France) Pierre-Hugues Herbert; (France) Gilles Simon
- Score: 7–6^{(7–5)}, 7–6^{(7–5)}

Details
- Draw: 16
- Seeds: 4

Events
Singles	Doubles
← 2017 ·	Maharashtra Open	· 2019 →

Rohan Bopanna and Jeevan Nedunchezhiyan were the defending champions, but lost in the quarterfinals to Pierre-Hugues Herbert and Gilles Simon.

Robin Haase and Matwé Middelkoop won the title, defeating Herbert and Simon in the final, 7–6^{(7–5)}, 7–6^{(7–5)}.

== Seeds ==
1. (Sweden) Robert Lindstedt / (Croatia) Franko Škugor (quarterfinals)
2. (Netherlands) Robin Haase / (Netherlands) Matwé Middelkoop (champions)
3. (Chile) Hans Podlipnik Castillo / (Belarus) Andrei Vasilevski (quarterfinals)
4. (India) Rohan Bopanna / (India) Jeevan Nedunchezhiyan (quarterfinals)

== Draw ==
=== Key ===
- Q = Qualifier
- WC = Wild card
- LL = Lucky loser
- Alt = Alternate
- SE = Special exempt
- PR = Protected ranking
- ITF = ITF entry
- JE = Junior exempt
- w/o = Walkover
- r = Retired
- d = Defaulted
- SR = Special ranking

=== Draw ===
First round

Quarterfinals

Semifinals

Final

1
(Sweden) R Lindstedt
(Croatia) F Škugor
6
6

- (Hungary) M Fucsovics
- (Kazakhstan) M Kukushkin
4
1

1
- (Sweden) R Lindstedt
- (Croatia) F Škugor
5
6
[6]

(India) Y Bhambri
(India) D Sharan
6
6

(India) Y Bhambri
(India) D Sharan
7
2
[10]

- (Serbia) L Đere
- (Slovenia) B Kavčič
2
2

- (India) Y Bhambri
- (India) D Sharan
4
6^{2}

4
(India) R Bopanna
(India) J Nedunchezhiyan
6
6

(France) P-H Herbert
(France) G Simon
6
7^{7}

- (India) L Paes
- (India) P Raja
3
2

4
- (India) R Bopanna
- (India) J Nedunchezhiyan
3
5

- (South Africa) K Anderson
- (Israel) J Erlich
6
3
[5]

(France) P-H Herbert
(France) G Simon
6
7

(France) P-H Herbert
(France) G Simon
3
6
[10]

- (France) P-H Herbert
- (France) G Simon
6^{5}
6^{5}

(Czech Republic) R Jebavý
(Czech Republic) J Veselý
6
6

2
(Netherlands) R Haase
(Netherlands) M Middelkoop
7^{7}
7^{7}

- (Moldova) R Albot
- (United States) T Sandgren
4
3

(Czech Republic) R Jebavý
(Czech Republic) J Veselý
7^{7}
7

- (Japan) B McLachlan
- (Argentina) A Molteni
7^{7}
4
[8]

3
- (Chile) H Podlipnik Castillo
- (Belarus) A Vasilevski
6^{4}
5

3
(Chile) H Podlipnik Castillo
(Belarus) A Vasilevski
6^{4}
6
[10]

- (Czech Republic) R Jebavý
- (Czech Republic) J Veselý
2
4

WC
- (India) S Balaji
- (India) V Vardhan
6
6^{8}
[6]

2
(Netherlands) R Haase
(Netherlands) M Middelkoop
6
6

(Canada) A Shamasdin
(United Kingdom) N Skupski
3
7^{10}
[10]

- (Canada) A Shamasdin
- (United Kingdom) N Skupski
3
5

WC
- (India) A Kadhe
- (France) B Paire
6
5
[7]

2
(Netherlands) R Haase
(Netherlands) M Middelkoop
6
7

2
(Netherlands) R Haase
(Netherlands) M Middelkoop
1
7
[10]
