= 2019 Tata Open Maharashtra – Singles =

Singles
- 2019 Tata Open Maharashtra

Final
- Champion: (South Africa) Kevin Anderson
- Runner-up: (Croatia) Ivo Karlović
- Score: 7–6^{(7–4)}, 6–7^{(2–7)}, 7–6^{(7–5)}

Details
- Draw: 28 (4 Q / 3 WC )
- Seeds: 8

Events
Singles	Doubles
← 2018 ·	Maharashtra Open	· 2020 →

Gilles Simon was the defending champion, but lost to Kevin Anderson in the semifinals.

Anderson went on to win the title, 7–6^{(7–4)}, 6–7^{(2–7)}, 7–6^{(7–5)}, against Ivo Karlović. Karlovic became the oldest player since Ken Rosewall in 1977 to contest an ATP final. With a combined height of 4.14 meters, this was the tallest final on the ATP tour in the open era.

== Seeds ==
The top four seeds receive a bye into the second round.

1. (South Africa) Kevin Anderson (champion)
2. (South Korea) Chung Hyeon (second round)
3. (France) Gilles Simon (semifinals)
4. (Tunisia) Malek Jaziri (quarterfinals)
5. (France) Benoît Paire (quarterfinals)
6. (Spain) Roberto Carballés Baena (first round)
7. (Spain) Jaume Munar (quarterfinals)
8. (Spain) Pablo Andújar (first round)

== Draw ==
=== Finals ===
Semifinals
1	(South Africa) Kevin Anderson	6	7^{7}
3	(France) Gilles Simon	3	6^{3}
PR	(Belgium) Steve Darcis	6^{3}	6	3
(Croatia) Ivo Karlović	7^{7}	4	6

Final
1	(South Africa) Kevin Anderson	7^{7}	6^{2}	7^{7}
(Croatia) Ivo Karlović	6^{4}	7^{7}	6^{5}

=== Top half ===
First round
(Serbia) L Đere	7	7^{8}
WC	(India) A Kadhe	5	6^{6}
Q	(Italy) S Bolelli	6	6
(Uzbekistan) D Istomin	4	4
(Moldova) R Albot	2	6^{4}
7	(Spain) J Munar	6	7^{7}
(Belarus) I Ivashka	6^{9}	6	6
(Poland) H Hurkacz	7^{11}	2	3
Q	(France) A Hoang	6	4	4
(Czech Republic) J Veselý	4	6	6
LL	(Brazil) T Monteiro	6^{5}	3
5	(France) B Paire	7^{7}	6

Second round
1	(South Africa) K Anderson	7^{7}	7^{8}
(Serbia) L Đere	6^{3}	6^{6}
Q	(Italy) S Bolelli	5	0
7	(Spain) J Munar	7	6
3	(France) G Simon	6^{3}	6	6
(Belarus) I Ivashka	7^{7}	2	1
(Czech Republic) J Veselý	4	2
5	(France) B Paire	6	6

Quarterfinals
1	(South Africa) K Anderson	6	6
7	(Spain) J Munar	3	3
3	(France) G Simon	3	7^{7}	6
5	(France) B Paire	6	6^{4}	4

Semifinals
1	(South Africa) K Anderson	6	7^{7}
3	(France) G Simon	3	6^{3}

=== Bottom half ===
First round
6	(Spain) R Carballés Baena	3	4
PR	(Belgium) S Darcis	6	6
(United States) M Mmoh	7	6
WC	(India) P Gunneswaran	5	3
(Spain) M Granollers	6	4	3
WC	(India) R Ramanathan	4	6	6
8	(Spain) P Andújar	3	7	6^{6}
(Russia) E Donskoy	6	5	7^{8}
Q	(Canada) F Auger-Aliassime	4	5
(Croatia) I Karlović	6	7
(Latvia) E Gulbis	6	4	6
(Portugal) P Sousa	4	6	4

Second round
PR	(Belgium) S Darcis	4	7^{7}	6
(United States) M Mmoh	6	6^{4}	2
WC	(India) R Ramanathan	7^{8}	6^{5}	3
4	(Tunisia) M Jaziri	6^{6}	7^{7}	6
(Russia) E Donskoy	4	5
(Croatia) I Karlović	6	7
(Latvia) E Gulbis	7^{7}	6
2	(South Korea) H Chung	6^{2}	2

Quarterfinals
PR	(Belgium) S Darcis	7	6
4	(Tunisia) M Jaziri	5	2
(Croatia) I Karlović	7^{7}	7^{7}
(Latvia) E Gulbis	6^{5}	6^{5}

Semifinals
PR	(Belgium) S Darcis	6^{3}	6	3
(Croatia) I Karlović	7^{7}	4	6

== Qualifying ==
=== Seeds ===
1. (Canada) Félix Auger-Aliassime (qualified)
2. (Belgium) Ruben Bemelmans (first round)
3. (Brazil) Thiago Monteiro (qualifying competition, Lucky loser)
4. (Chinese Taipei) Jason Jung (first round)
5. (Italy) Simone Bolelli (qualified)
6. (France) Antoine Hoang (qualified)
7. (Italy) Gianluigi Quinzi (qualifying competition)
8. (Belarus) Egor Gerasimov (qualifying competition)

=== Qualifiers ===
1. (Canada) Félix Auger-Aliassime
2. (Italy) Simone Bolelli
3. (France) Antoine Hoang
4. (India) Saketh Myneni

=== Lucky loser ===
1. (Brazil) Thiago Monteiro

=== Qualifying draw ===
==== First qualifier ====
First round
1	(Canada) Félix Auger-Aliassime	6^{2}	6	3
(El Salvador) Marcelo Arévalo	7^{7}	1	2^{r}
WC	(India) Sasikumar Mukund	1	1
7	(Italy) Gianluigi Quinzi	6	6

Qualifying competition
1	(Canada) Félix Auger-Aliassime	7	6
7	(Italy) Gianluigi Quinzi	5	3

==== Second qualifier ====
First round
2	(Belgium) Ruben Bemelmans	7	3	1
(Austria) Sebastian Ofner	5	6	6
(Canada) Brayden Schnur	3	6^{5}
5	(Italy) Simone Bolelli	6	7^{7}

Qualifying competition
(Austria) Sebastian Ofner	6^{4}	5
5	(Italy) Simone Bolelli	7^{7}	7

==== Third qualifier ====
First round
3	(Brazil) Thiago Monteiro	7^{7}	7
(Germany) Daniel Brands	6^{5}	5
(Slovakia) Andrej Martin	1	2
6	(France) Antoine Hoang	6	6

Qualifying competition
3	(Brazil) Thiago Monteiro	6	3	2
6	(France) Antoine Hoang	4	6	6

==== Fourth qualifier ====
First round
4	(Chinese Taipei) Jason Jung	1	7	2
WC	(India) Saketh Myneni	6	5	6
(Spain) Daniel Gimeno Traver	3	6	2
8	(Belarus) Egor Gerasimov	6	3	6

Qualifying competition
WC	(India) Saketh Myneni	6	6^{4}	7^{7}
8	(Belarus) Egor Gerasimov	4	7^{7}	6^{4}
