= 2020 Tata Open Maharashtra – Doubles =

Doubles
- 2020 Tata Open Maharashtra

Final
- Champions: (Sweden) André Göransson; (Indonesia) Christopher Rungkat
- Runners-up: (Israel) Jonathan Erlich; (Belarus) Andrei Vasilevski
- Score: 6–2, 3–6, [10–8]

Details
- Draw: 16
- Seeds: 4

Events
| Singles | Doubles |
- Maharashtra Open

Rohan Bopanna and Divij Sharan were the defending champions, but chose not to participate together. Bopanna played alongside Arjun Kadhe but lost in the first round to Antoine Hoang and Benoît Paire. Sharan teamed up with Artem Sitak but lost in the first round to Matthew Ebden and Leander Paes.

André Göransson and Christopher Rungkat won the title, defeating Jonathan Erlich and Andrei Vasilevski in the final, 6–2, 3–6, [10–8].

== Seeds ==
1. (Netherlands) Robin Haase / (Sweden) Robert Lindstedt (quarterfinals)
2. (India) Divij Sharan / (New Zealand) Artem Sitak (first round)
3. (Israel) Jonathan Erlich / (Belarus) Andrei Vasilevski (final)
4. (Chinese Taipei) Hsieh Cheng-peng / (Ukraine) Denys Molchanov (first round)

== Draw ==
Key

- Q = Qualifier
- WC = Wild card
- LL = Lucky loser
- Alt = Alternate
- ITF = ITF entry
- PR = Protected ranking
- SR = Special ranking
- SE = Special exempt
- JE = Junior exempt
- JR = Junior Accelerator Programme entrant
- CO = College Accelerator Programme entrant
- NG = Next Gen Accelerator Program entrant
- w/o = Walkover
- r = Retired
- d = Defaulted

=== Draw ===
First round

Quarterfinals

Semifinals

Final

1
(Netherlands) R Haase
(Sweden) R Lindstedt
6^{5}
6
[10]

- (Netherlands) S Arends
- (Netherlands) D Pel
7^{7}
3
[8]

1
- (Netherlands) R Haase
- (Sweden) R Lindstedt
3
3

- (United States) N Monroe
- (United States) J Withrow
6^{5}
6
[8]

(Monaco) R Arneodo
(Germany) A Begemann
6
6

(Monaco) R Arneodo
(Germany) A Begemann
7^{7}
4
[10]

- (Monaco) R Arneodo
- (Germany) A Begemann
4
6^{1}

4
- (Chinese Taipei) C-p Hsieh
- (Ukraine) D Molchanov
6
4
[8]

(Sweden) A Göransson
(Indonesia) C Rungkat
6
7^{7}

(Sweden) A Göransson
(Indonesia) C Rungkat
3
6
[10]

(Sweden) A Göransson
(Indonesia) C Rungkat
6
6

(France) A Hoang
(France) B Paire
3
7
[10]

- (France) A Hoang
- (France) B Paire
3
3

WC
- (India) R Bopanna
- (India) A Kadhe
6
5
[7]

(Sweden) A Göransson
(Indonesia) C Rungkat
6
3
[10]

(Italy) P Lorenzi
(Italy) S Travaglia
6
6

3
- (Israel) J Erlich
- (Belarus) A Vasilevski
2
6
[8]

- (Lithuania) R Berankis
- (Russia) E Donskoy
3
4

- (Italy) P Lorenzi
- (Italy) S Travaglia
7
1
[8]

- (Australia) J Duckworth
- (Australia) M Reid
6
3
[8]

3
(Israel) J Erlich
(Belarus) A Vasilevski
5
6
[10]

3
(Israel) J Erlich
(Belarus) A Vasilevski
4
6
[10]

3
(Israel) J Erlich
(Belarus) A Vasilevski
7^{7}
6

(India) P Raja
(India) R Ramanathan
7^{8}
6

- (India) P Raja
- (India) R Ramanathan
6^{3}
4

Alt
- (Belarus) E Gerasimov
- (India) S Nagal
6^{6}
3

(India) P Raja
(India) R Ramanathan
6
6

WC
(Australia) M Ebden
(India) L Paes
6
7^{7}

WC
- (Australia) M Ebden
- (India) L Paes
2
1

2
- (India) D Sharan
- (New Zealand) A Sitak
2
6^{5}
