= T20 Mumbai League =

T20 cricket league played in Mumbai, India

- Countries: India
- Administrator: Mumbai Cricket Association (MCA), Probability Sports India Private Limited
- Format: Twenty20
- First edition: 2018
- Latest edition: 2026
- Next edition: 2027
- Tournament format: M: Round-robin and playoffs W: Double Round-robin and top two teams play final
- Number of teams: M: 8 W: 3
- Current champion: M: MSC Maratha Royals (2nd Title); W: SoBo Mumbai Falcons (Women's) (1st Title)
- Most successful: M: MSC Maratha Royals (2 Titles); W: SoBo Mumbai Falcons (Women's) (1 Title)
- TV: Star Sports (India), JioHotstar
- Website: www.t20mumbai.com
- T20 Mumbai League 2026

The T20 Mumbai League, (Note: Officially known as the Nuvama Private T20 Mumbai League for sponsorship reasons.) also known as T20 Mumbai, is a professional Twenty20 cricket league held in Mumbai, India. Organised by the Mumbai Cricket Association (MCA), the league bills itself as a grass-roots platform to discover, develop and promote local cricketing talent, from the city and its surrounding districts.

== History ==
The inaugural edition of the tournament was launched on 22 February 2018 by Sachin Tendulkar, their brand ambassador, with matches running from Sunday 11 March to Wednesday 21 March. Triumph Knights Mumbai North East won the first-ever title. Following its second season in 2019, the league entered a multi-year hiatus due to the COVID-19 pandemic and scheduling conflicts. The league successfully returned for its third season in June 2025, with Rohit Sharma as brand ambassador. The MCA made it mandatory for players from Mumbai to play in the league in order to get selected in Mumbai's team for key domestic tournaments like Syed Mushtaq Ali Trophy. The 2025 season saw players like Ajinkya Rahane, Prithvi Shaw, Shardul Thakur, Shivam Dube, Shreyas Iyer and Suryakumar Yadav representing their respective teams.

On 26 May 2026, MCA signed a five-year MoU with Cricket Uganda to boost cricket development and elite exposure.

In June 2026, the league completed its fourth season, while MCA expanded its infrastructure by launching the inaugural edition of the T20 Mumbai Women's League.

== Teams ==
As of 2026, the men's league features eight city-based franchises representing different regions of Mumbai, while the women's league features three city-based franchises.

Team Locations in Mumbai

ARCS Andheri, Bandra Blasters, North Mumbai Panthers, Shivaji Park Lions, SoBo Supersonics and Triumph Knights Mumbai North East were the founding members of the league, while Aakash Tigers MWS and Eagle Thane Strikers joined the league in 2019. MSC Maratha Royals and SoBo Mumbai Falcons joined the league in 2025.

MCA inaugurated the T20 Mumbai Women's League in 2026. While Aakash Tigers MWS and SoBo Mumbai Falcons formed their women's wing, a new team Thane Sky Risers joined as the third team.

=== The Shivaji Park Lions Termination ===
Following Season 2 in 2019, Jupicos Entertainment Pvt. Ltd., the special-purpose entity formed to own and manage the Shivaji Park Lions by the winning bidders, claimed it encountered massive losses. They stated they paid their full ₹5.6 crore participation fee to the organisers but only generated ₹3.7 crore in total revenue, receiving zero central sponsorship payout from the league's central pool. Because of these mounting financial difficulties, Jupicos defaulted on its subsequent contractual payment deadlines. Probability Sports issued a notice of default to Jupicos in November 2019, and terminated their contract in January 2020. In February 2020, the compliance team at Probability Sports informed the MCA they had revoked Shivaji Park Lions' and Sobo SuperSonics' franchise rights, as both teams had materially breached their payment obligations.

After the MCA announced the tournament's 2025 revival after its long pandemic hiatus, Jupicos filed an emergency arbitration petition in the Bombay High Court, attempting to secure an interim injunction to stop the league from operating without them. In May 2025, a Division Bench of the Bombay High Court dismissed the case, citing an "inordinate delay" of five years in legally challenging the 2020 termination order.

With the legal tracks officially cleared, the MCA sold the vacant Mumbai South Central territory rights to Royal Edge Sports & Entertainment for ₹57 crore, who founded the MSC Maratha Royals to permanently fill the void. In March 2026, the Bombay High Court formally appointed a private arbitrator to oversee the residual financial dispute. MSC Maratha Royals went on to complete a two-peat by winning the T20 Mumbai League 2025 season on their debut and repeating their success in the 2026 season.

Team name	City / Towns	Owners	Men's captain	Women's captain	Team established	Current status
Aakash Tigers MWS	Western Suburbs (Mumbai)	Aakash Group	Sarfaraz Khan	Humairaa Kaazi	2019 (Men's), 2026 (Women's)	(both teams are active as of 2026)
ARCS Andheri	Andheri	Dr. P.V. Shetty, Bhushan Patil, Dr. Amee Dipen Parekh	Shivam Dube	team does not exist	2018	(active as of 2026)
Bandra Blasters	Bandra	PK Sports Ventures Pvt. Ltd.	Suved Parkar	team does not exist	2018 (as NaMo Bandra Blasters)	(active as of 2026)
Eagle Thane Strikers	Thane	Rupchandani Family and Hitesh Solanki	Shardul Thakur	team does not exist	2019	(active as of 2026)
MSC Maratha Royals	Mumbai South Central	Royal Edge Sports & Entertainment LLP	Siddhesh Lad	team does not exist	2025	(active as of 2026)
North Mumbai Panthers	Mumbai North	SanRaj Group	Ajinkya Rahane	team does not exist	2018	(active as of 2026)
Shivaji Park Lions	Mumbai South Central	Sharad Kapoor and Jupicos Sports Pvt. Ltd.	Siddhesh Lad	team did not exist	2018	(defunct after 2019 season)
SoBo Mumbai Falcons	South Mumbai	Ameet Gadhoke, Navjeet Gadhoke and Pratik Thakur	Shreyas Iyer	Sayali Satghare	2018 (as SoBo SuperSonics) (Men's), 2026 (Women's)	(both teams are active as of 2026)
Thane Sky Risers	Thane	Vihang Group	team does not exist	Saima Thakor	2026	(active as of 2026)
Triumph Knights Mumbai North East	Mumbai North-East	Dipesh Nirupam and The Viva Group	Suryakumar Yadav	team does not exist	2018	(active as of 2026)

== Venues ==
Wankhede Stadium hosted all the seasons, which included all the matches during the 2018, 2019 and 2026 seasons, while co-hosting with DY Patil Stadium for the 2025 returning season.

Maharashtra
Mumbai	Navi Mumbai
Wankhede Stadium	DY Patil Stadium
Capacity: 33,100	Capacity: 45,300
Wankhede Stadium	DY Patil Stadium

== Tournament Seasons and Results ==
=== Men's Finals ===
Season	Final					Player of the Match(Final)	Player of the Tournament
Season	Match Summary	Result	Winners	Runners-up	Venue	Player of the Match(Final)	Player of the Tournament
2018	Triumph Knights Mumbai North East; 182/5 (20 overs) vs Shivaji Park Lions; 179/8 (20 overs)	Triumph Knights Mumbai North East won by 3 runs	Triumph Knights Mumbai North East	Shivaji Park Lions	Wankhede Stadium, Mumbai	Suryakumar Yadav	Shivam Dube
2019	North Mumbai Panthers; 143/7 (20 overs) vs SoBo Mumbai Falcons; 131 (19.4 overs)	North Mumbai Panthers won by 12 runs	North Mumbai Panthers	SoBo Mumbai Falcons	Wankhede Stadium, Mumbai	Atif Attarwala	Prithvi Shaw
2025	MSC Maratha Royals; 158/5 (19.2 overs) vs SoBo Mumbai Falcons; 157/4 (20 overs)	MSC Maratha Royals won by 5 wickets	MSC Maratha Royals	SoBo Mumbai Falcons	Wankhede Stadium, Mumbai	Chinmay Sutar	Sairaj Patil
2026	ARCS Andheri; 146/4 (20 overs) vs MSC Maratha Royals; 154/5 (20 overs)	MSC Maratha Royals won by 8 runs	MSC Maratha Royals	ARCS Andheri	Wankhede Stadium, Mumbai	Tushar Deshpande	Suved Parkar

=== Women's Finals ===
Season	Final					Player of the Match(Final)	Player of the Tournament
Season	Match Summary	Result	Winners	Runners-up	Venue	Player of the Match(Final)	Player of the Tournament
2026	SoBo Mumbai Falcons; 124/6 (20 overs) vs Aakash Tigers MWS; 99 (18.5 overs)	SoBo Mumbai Falcons won by 25 runs	SoBo Mumbai Falcons	Aakash Tigers MWS	Wankhede Stadium, Mumbai	Janhvi Kate	Sanika Chalke

== Team's Performance ==
=== Men's ===
Season Franchise	2018	2019	2025	2026
Aakash Tigers MWS	–	SF	7th	SF
ARCS Andheri	6th	SF	8th	RU
Bandra Blasters	4th	7th	SF	8th
Eagle Thane Strikers	–	5th	SF	6th
MSC Maratha Royals	–	–	W	W
North Mumbai Panthers	5th	W	5th	SF
Shivaji Park Lions	RU	8th	–	–
SoBo Mumbai Falcons	3rd	RU	RU	5th
Triumph Knights Mumbai North East	W	5th	6th	7th

Legend

- W– Winner
- RU– Runner-up
- 3rd, SF– 3rd place (2018), Semi-finalists (2019-)
- 4th– 4th place (2018)
- – Team does not / did not exist

=== Women's ===
Season Franchise	2026
Aakash Tigers MWS	RU
SoBo Mumbai Falcons	W
Thane Sky Risers	3rd

Legend

- W– Winner
- RU– Runner-up
