= Gilles Simon =

French tennis player (born 1984)

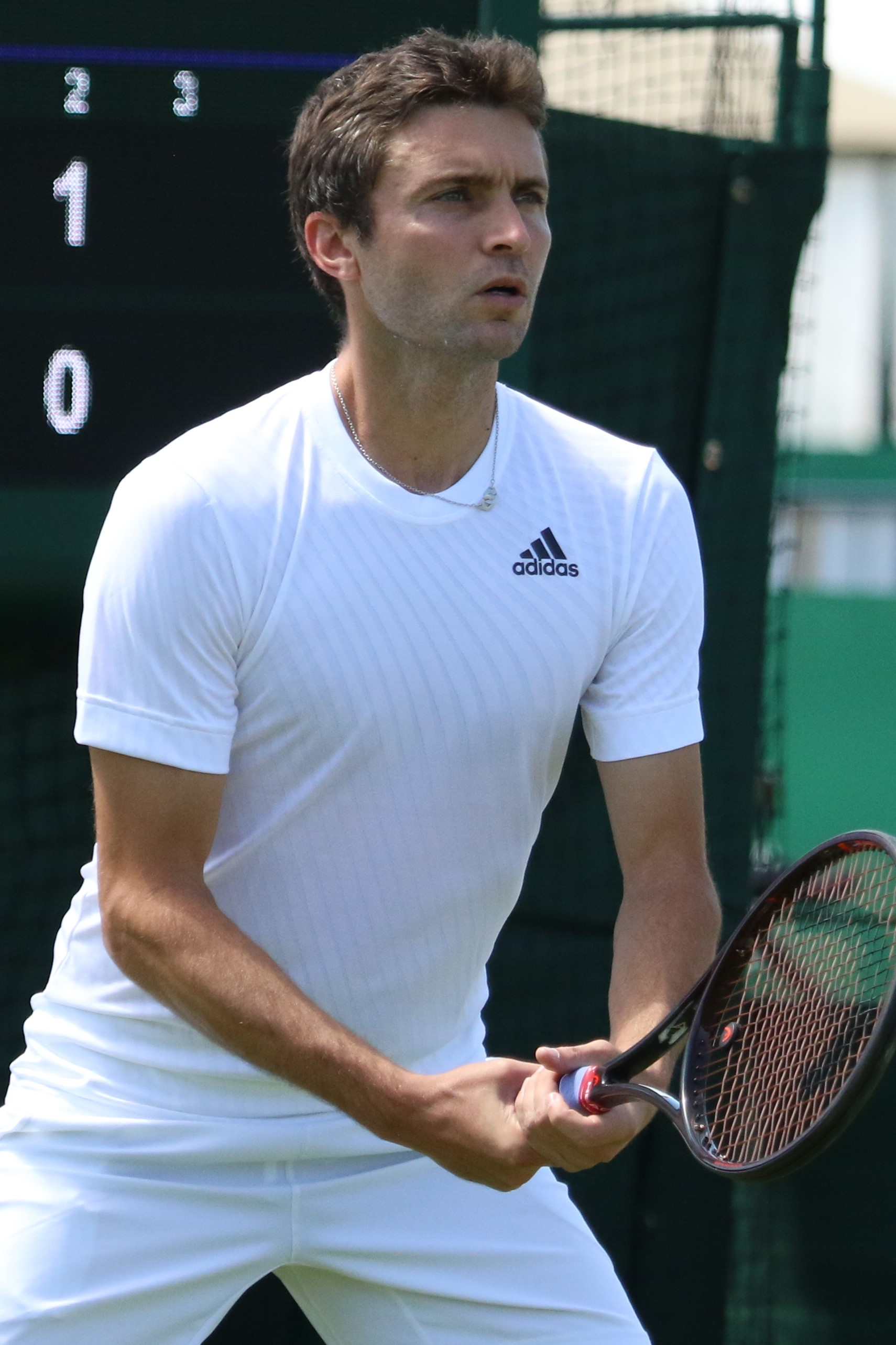
- Simon at the 2022 Wimbledon qualifying
- Country (sports): France
- Residence: Boulogne-Billancourt, France
- Born: 27 December 1984 (age 41) Nice, France
- Height: 1.83 m (6 ft 0 in)
- Turned pro: 2002
- Retired: 2022
- Plays: Right-handed (two-handed backhand)
- Coach: Étienne Laforgue
- Prize money: US$ 16,045,734

Singles
- Career record: 504–394 (56.1%) (Note: in ATP Tour and Grand Slam main draw matches, and in Davis Cup)
- Career titles: 14
- Highest ranking: No. 6 (5 January 2009)

Grand Slam singles results
- Australian Open: QF (2009)
- French Open: 4R (2011, 2013, 2015)
- Wimbledon: QF (2015)
- US Open: 4R (2011, 2014)

Other tournaments
- Tour Finals: SF (2008)
- Olympic Games: 3R (2008, 2012, 2016)

Doubles
- Career record: 42–148 (22.1%)
- Career titles: 0
- Highest ranking: No. 117 (28 January 2008)

Grand Slam doubles results
- Australian Open: 2R (2008)
- French Open: 2R (2005)
- Wimbledon: 1R (2006, 2007)
- US Open: 3R (2007)

Mixed doubles
- Career record: 2–4

Grand Slam mixed doubles results
- French Open: 2R (2008)

Team competitions
- Davis Cup: W (2017)
- Hopman Cup: RR (2009)

Gilles Simon (French pronunciation: [ʒil si.mɔ̃]; born 27 December 1984) is a French former tennis player. He turned professional in 2002 and won fourteen singles titles on the ATP Tour, and attained a career-high ATP singles ranking of No. 6, on 5 January 2009.

== Personal life ==
Gilles Simon was born in Nice but grew up in Fontenay-sous-Bois, outside Paris. His nickname is "Gilou". His mother is a doctor. His father works for an insurance company. Gilles has a brother.

Supported by his parents, he started playing tennis at the age of six. Owing to a growth delay that runs in the family, he was shorter than most children of his age during his early teenage years. This is the reason he cites Michael Chang as a major influence, as his comparatively small frame proved that size was not the only factor in playing tennis.

Simon and his wife have two sons, born in 2010 and 2013.

== Career ==
=== 2002–2005 ===
Simon began his professional tennis career in the summer of 2002, competing at multiple Futures tournaments in France before playing in tournaments outside the country of his birth. His first Futures title came in Lisbon, Portugal, in June 2003, and he reached the quarterfinals of three other tournaments. He then captured his second title in Jamaica in September. During 2004, he saw three wins in France and another in Algeria.

Simon made his ATP Tour debut in Metz, France in October 2004 as a 19-year-old.

In January 2005, he won his first ATP Challenger hardcourt tournament in Nouméa, New Caledonia, and defended it the following year. Ranked as world No. 113, Simon made his Grand Slam debut at the 2005 French Open, losing in the first round to Olivier Patience in four sets.

=== 2006: Reaching the top 50 ===
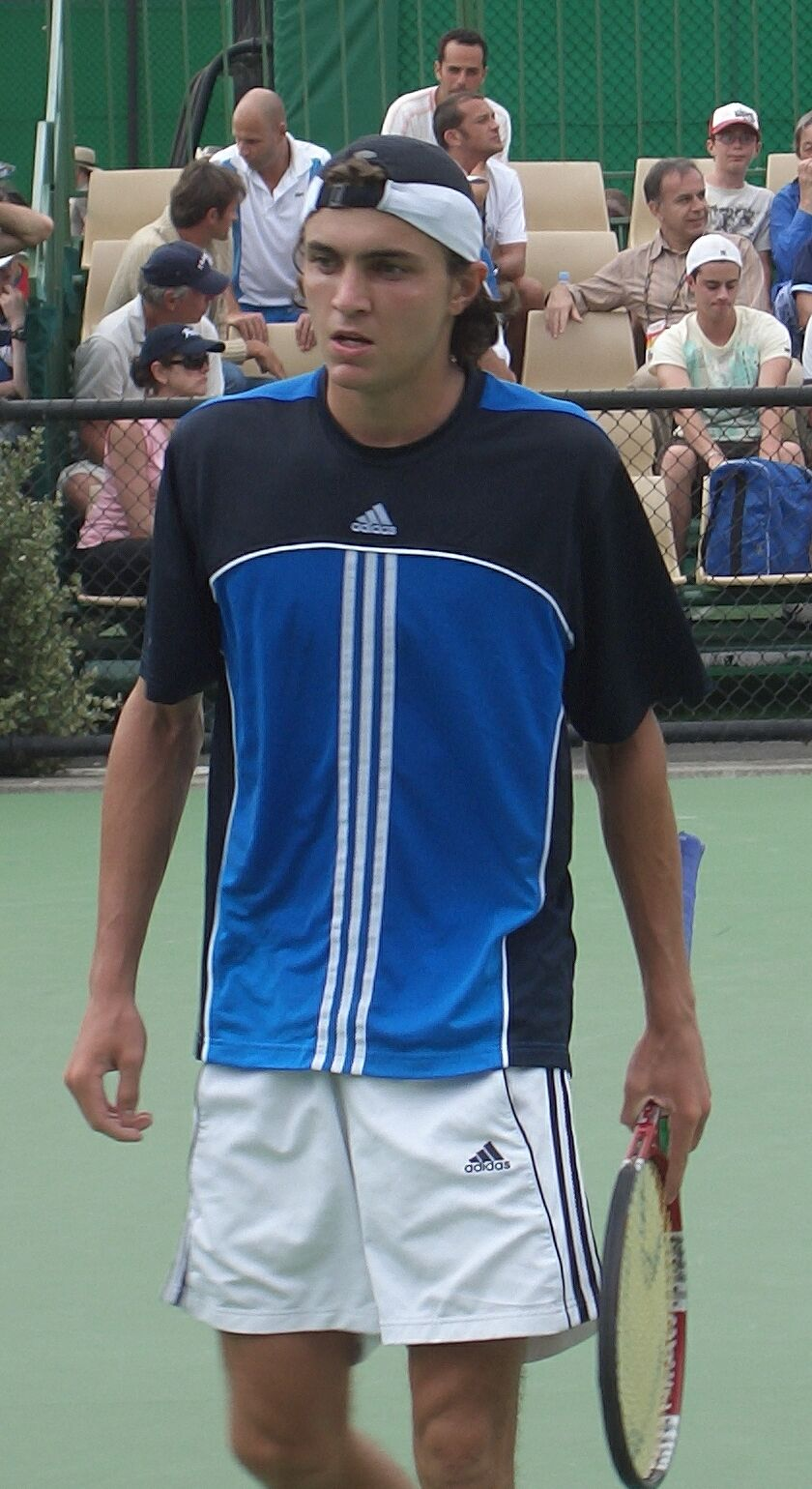
At the 2006 Australian Open

Simon competed at the Australian Open, where he beat Nicolás Massú and Tomáš Berdych, before being defeated by No. 13 Thomas Johansson in the third round. After this result, he broke into the top 100 for the first time, climbing to No. 89.

The Frenchman reached his first ATP Tour final in Valencia with wins over Andreas Seppi in the quarterfinal and Fernando Verdasco in the semifinal, but lost to Nicolás Almagro. He also made it to the semifinals in Casablanca, as well as the round of 16 in both the ATP Masters Series tournaments in Monte Carlo and Hamburg. At the end of the year Simon was ranked 45th in the world.

=== 2007: First & second ATP Tour titles ===
At the beginning of the year, Simon won his first ATP title at the Open 13 in, Marseille, France. En route to the final, Simon beat Lleyton Hewitt, Jonas Björkman, and Robin Söderling. In the final, Simon defeated Marcus Baghdatis.

In September, he won his second title of the year and of his career at the Romania Open in Bucharest. He defeated Victor Hănescu in the final. He broke into the top 30 for the first time on 5 November, and finished the year as No. 29 in the world. By the end of the year, his career record against top-10 players was 4–5.

=== 2008: Reaching top 10 ===
Simon reached the quarterfinals in Marseille, defeating world No. 3, Novak Djokovic, in the second round. He reached the semifinals in Rotterdam the next week.

In May, he entered Casablanca as a qualifier due to his late entry to the tournament, even though his ranking was high enough to be seeded. Simon went on to win the tournament, defeating Julien Benneteau in the final. After his third-round loss to fellow French Richard Gasquet at Wimbledon, Simon left Europe for the United States to familiarize himself with the hardcourts before the US Open Series. He won the Indianapolis Tennis Championships and hit a career-best No. 25.

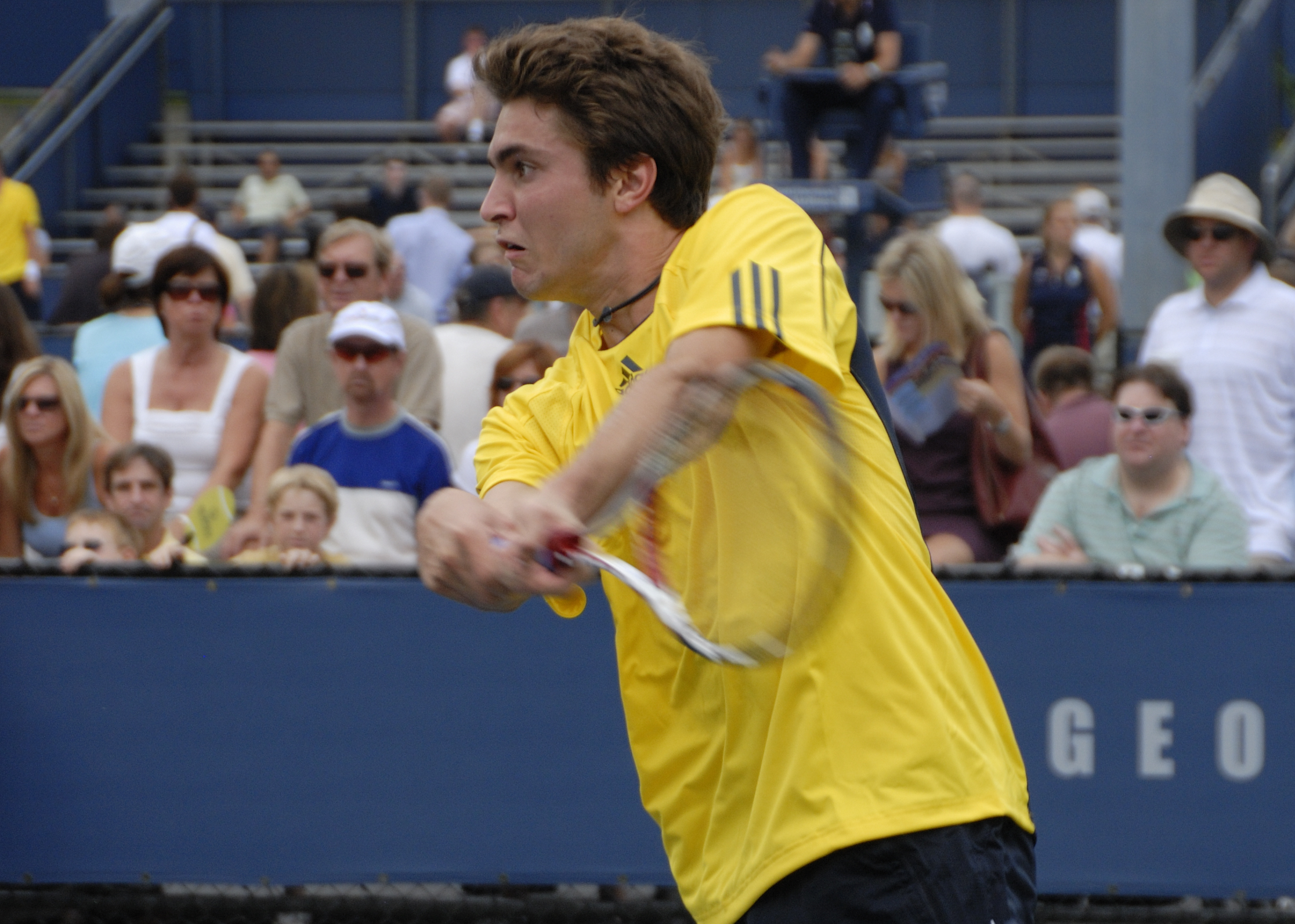
Simon at the 2008 US Open

The following week, he competed at the Canada Masters in Toronto, including a win over world No. 1, Roger Federer, in the second round, before losing in the semifinals to German veteran Nicolas Kiefer. This resulted in an entry into the top 15, three ranks behind the French number one, Richard Gasquet.

Simon participated in the 2008 Summer Olympics in Beijing, playing in the singles for France alongside Paul-Henri Mathieu, Michaël Llodra, and Gaël Monfils. He played doubles with Monfils, but lost in the first round to the Indian team of Bhupathi and Paes. In singles the Frenchman reached the third round before falling to James Blake.

At the US Open, Simon was seeded No. 16. On day six, he lost in the third round to the 17th seed Juan Martín del Potro, in a five-set match that lasted 3 hours and 47 minutes.

On 14 September, Simon won his third title of the year and fifth career title, defeating Carlos Moyá at the Romanian Open. Simon entered the Madrid Masters the following month, defeating No. 11 James Blake and No. 14 Ivo Karlović to reach the semifinals. In the semifinals, he defeated world No. 1, Rafael Nadal, in three sets, in a match that lasted 3 hours and 23 minutes. Simon lost the final to world No. 4, Andy Murray, in straight sets. The tournament boosted Simon to a career-high world No. 10, displacing Richard Gasquet as French No. 1. By the end of 2008, France had four players in the top 20 (Simon, Tsonga, Gasquet, and Monfils), for the first time since computer rankings were established in 1973. The French paper L'Équipe grouped the four player as néo-Mousquetaires. French TV Canal+ went on to produce a documentary series that followed the four French players and their touring around the world. The series "Les 4 Mousquetaires" went on the air for two seasons during 2009 and 2010.

On 3 November, he qualified for the Tennis Masters Cup, a tournament usually reserved for the world's top eight players in Shanghai, after Rafael Nadal withdrew due to knee complications and fatigue. He was drawn in the red group with Roger Federer, Andy Murray, and Andy Roddick. In his first round-robin match, he beat defending champion Federer. Simon lost to Murray in his next match, but followed it with a victory over Radek Štěpánek, who replaced the injured Roddick. After Murray defeated Federer in the final round-robin match, Simon qualified for the semifinals, where he lost to world No. 3, Novak Djokovic, in three sets. After this, he achieved a career high of world No. 7.

In December, he played in the newly formed 2008 Masters France exhibition tournament for the eight French players who had performed best at the four French tournaments. He qualified from the round-robin group stage with victories against Julien Benneteau, Marc Gicquel, and Josselin Ouanna. In the final against Michaël Llodra, Llodra pulled out with a shoulder injury, resulting in Simon's becoming the inaugural winner of the tournament.

=== 2009: Australian Open quarterfinal ===
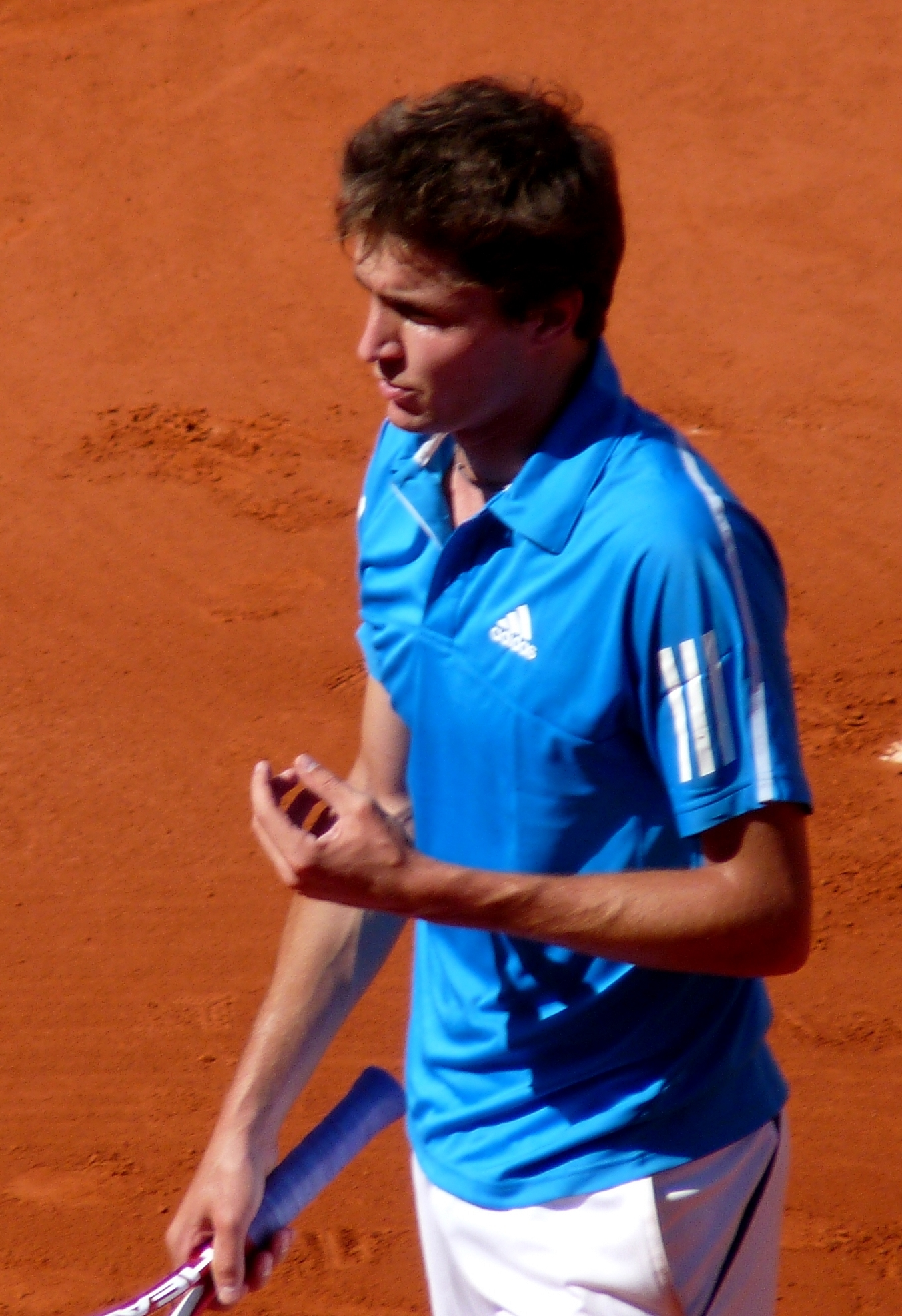
Simon during the 2009 French Open

Simon started the year off rising to a new career-high of world No. 6 and played at the Hopman Cup, teaming up with compatriot Alizé Cornet to form the French mixed doubles duo.

Simon played at the 2009 Australian Open, as the sixth seed, where he reached the quarterfinals before losing to world No. 1, Rafael Nadal.

He participated in the Davis Cup with other French team members Michaël Llodra, Jo-Wilfried Tsonga, and Richard Gasquet. The team competed against the Czech Republic from 6–8 March. Simon lost to Tomáš Berdych, and then played Radek Štěpánek (whom his fellow team member Tsonga beat). Simon lost to Štěpánek, which gave the Czechs a 3–1 lead, and France was out of the Davis Cup in the first round for the first time since 2000.

He went into the Miami Open ranked No. 7 in the world. He reached the fourth round before losing to Jo-Wilfried Tsonga.

Simon played at the Estoril Open as the top seed, before losing to Albert Montañés, in the third round. He competed with fellow players Jo-Wilfried Tsonga and Jérémy Chardy, forming the French team at the ARAG World Team Cup in Düsseldorf. He lost to Robin Söderling and Rainer Schüttler.

He entered Roland Garros as the seventh seed and reached the third round, losing to Victor Hănescu. During the match, he injured his right knee. Although he finished the match, the injury developed into a chronic issue. At Wimbledon, Simon reached the fourth round where he lost to unseeded Spaniard Juan Carlos Ferrero.

During the 2009 US Open Series, he played at the Rogers Cup where he lost to Jo-Wilfried Tsonga in the third round. One week later, he played at the Cincinnati Open where he defeated Nikolay Davydenko en route to the quarterfinals, where he would lose to world No. 4, Novak Djokovic. At the 2009 US Open, Simon equalled his best result of third round before retiring with a right knee injury during his third-round match against Juan Carlos Ferrero. Simon then won his first title of 2009 at the Thailand Open, defeating Viktor Troicki in the final.

Simon returned to France to play in Lyon and lost in the semifinal to Michaël Llodra. At the next tournament in Valencia, he lost to Mikhail Youzhny in the quarterfinal. He continued to Bercy to play at the Paris Masters where he was seeded 11th and had a first-round bye. In the second round, he faced Ivan Ljubičić. While lunging to return a wide serve, he aggravated a right knee injury that has been bothering him for half of the 2009 season. Although with his movement severely hampered, Simon decided to play on to finish the match in front of an enthusiastic home crowd. He went on to win the match. In an interview during the Paris tournament, Simon said that the doctor had recommended that he take at least two months to recover from his knee injury.

=== 2010: Seventh career title ===
He started the 2010 season with an exhibition event, the World Tennis Challenge in Adelaide. Simon struggled with injury and lost three straight matches, including to the home favourite Bernard Tomic. He pulled out of the Australian Open due to his knee injury. He did not make any appearances in the 2010 season until mid-February, at the 2010 Open 13 tournament in Marseille, losing in the first round.

The injury eventually caused Simon to miss the entire spring European clay-court season, including the French Open. He returned to the tour in mid-June winning two rounds in Eastbourne, before losing to Michaël Llodra in the quarterfinals. At the 2010 Wimbledon tournament, Simon reached the third round. He began the summer US hardcourt season by participating in the Legg Mason Tennis Classic in Washington, D.C. reaching the quarterfinals. However, he suffered first-round defeats in his next two ATP Masters 1000 tournaments, the Rogers Cup in Toronto and the Western & Southern Open in Cincinnati. He moved on to New York to take part in US Open, reaching the third round. He went on to meet the No. 1 player Rafael Nadal in the third round. Before the match, upon hearing about the birth of Simon's son, Nadal jokingly offered to buy Simon a flight ticket back to Europe to see his son before the match. Simon stayed, and lost to the eventual champion Nadal.

Simon then entered 2010 Open de Moselle as a wildcard. Originally, he did not plan to play the tournament because his son was supposed to be due that week. He took his newly extended family to Metz and eventually won the tournament by beating Mischa Zverev in the final. This was his seventh career title, coming only weeks after the birth of his first child. During the award ceremony, he thanked his girlfriend for the support and called the victory a "family effort."

The rest of 2010 was more ups and downs, indicating that after returning from the serious knee injury, he was still struggling to find his consistency. He went on to participate in two Asian tournaments. He beat Sam Querrey and Michael Berrer to reach the quarterfinals of the China Open in Beijing, but lost to Djokovic. He then lost in the first round of the Shanghai Masters to Stanislas Wawrinka. After Asia, he returned to France to play Open Sud de France in Montpellier, where he reached the quarterfinals. The next tournament was the Valencia Open 500, where Simon beat two seeds (Fernando Verdasco and Nikolay Davydenko) en route to his semifinal appearance, only to lose to the Spanish qualifier Marcel Granollers.

In December 2010, Simon was picked to play the Davis Cup final for France, which was hosted in Belgrade, Serbia. The final was filled with controversies over which player was to be called on to play each match. France called on Simon to play Novak Djokovic in day one, while others were expecting Michaël Llodra to play, based on Llodra's good form in the Paris Masters (including beating Djokovic in two sets). Simon lost the match in three sets. When France won the doubles and led 2–1 going into day 3, the French team seemed to be on its way to yet another Davis Cup victory. But day 3 opened with Djokovic in strong form defeating Monfils in three easy sets, leaving the championship to a deciding fifth match. The schedule originally stated that the fifth match was to be played by Janko Tipsarević and Simon. Last-minute replacement saw both replaced by their teammates Viktor Troicki and Michaël Llodra, respectively. The fifth match ended in anticlimactic fashion with an overwhelming victory for Troicki in three sets. Serbia won the Davis Cup for the first time in history. France's defeat caused some to question the choice of Llodra to play Troicki when Simon has a 4–0 head-to-head record against the Serb. Nevertheless, everyone agreed that Troicki and the Serbian team had displayed convincing performances over their French opponent, and the victory was well deserved.

=== 2011: Eight & ninth ATP titles ===
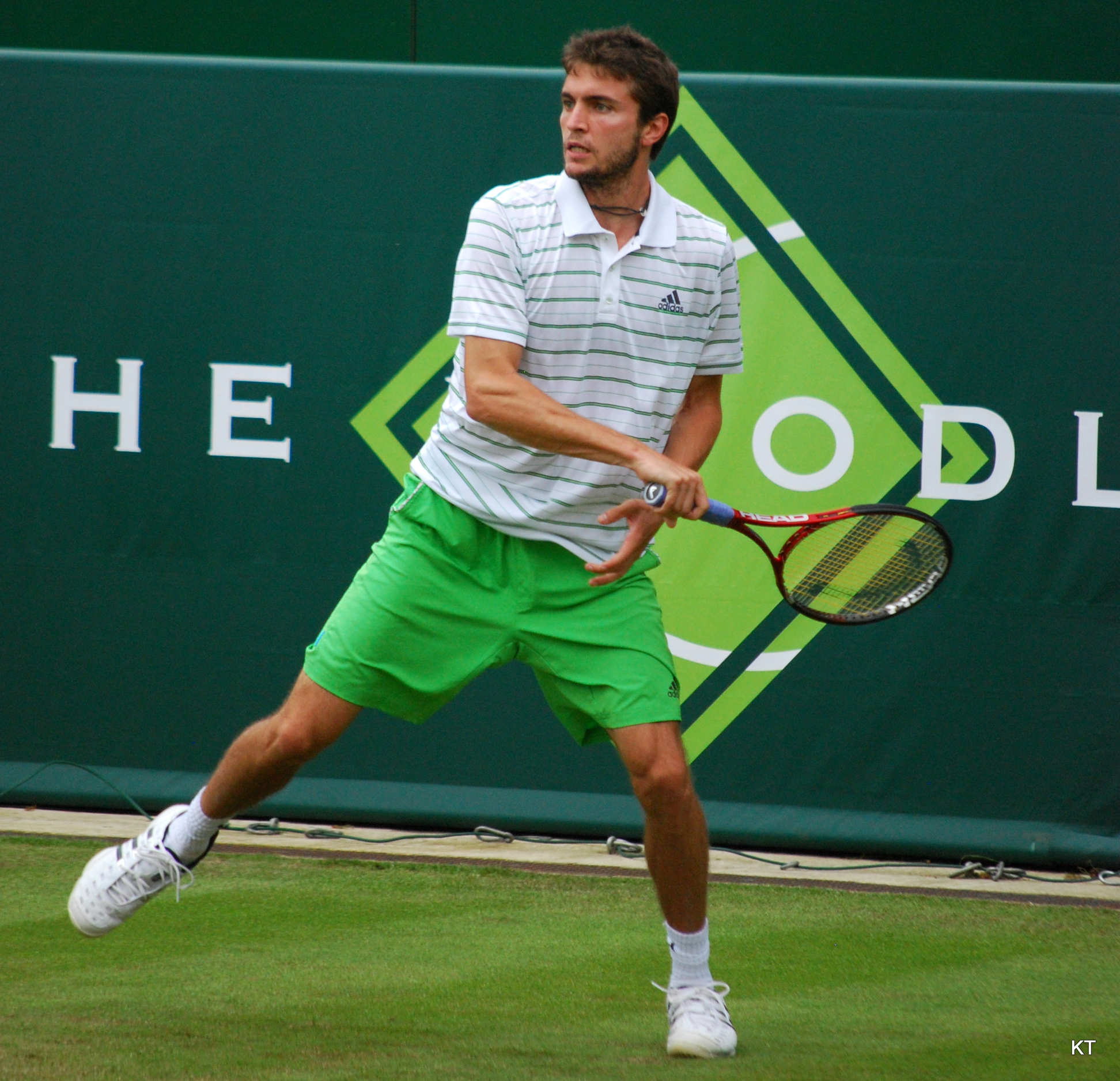
Gilles Simon in action in 2011

Simon started his 2011 campaign by entering three tournaments in Australia: Brisbane, Sydney, and the 2011 Australian Open. He lost in the first round of Brisbane to Santiago Giraldo. One week later, he beat Alexandr Dolgopolov and Ernests Gulbis in the quarterfinals and semifinals and then captured his eighth title by defeating Viktor Troicki, in the final of the Sydney International. In the Australian Open, he lost to Roger Federer in the second round in a five set match. Simon went on to defeat Nicolás Almagro in Hamburg, capturing the most important title of his career in terms of ATP rankings.

Simon reached the fourth round of Roland Garros but lost to Robin Söderling. At Wimbledon, he lost to Juan Martín del Potro in the third round.

At the US Open, he advanced to the fourth round by defeating Ricardo Mello, Guillermo García López, and Juan Martín del Potro before losing to John Isner.

=== 2012: Tenth ATP title, two Masters 1000 semifinals ===
Simon started his season at the Brisbane International, where he made the semifinals before losing to Alexandr Dolgopolov. At the 2012 Australian Open, Simon went out in the second round to his countryman Julien Benneteau.

He made the semifinals of the Open Sud de France and the quarterfinals at Indian Wells, where he went down against John Isner. In Miami, he was defeated by Andy Murray in the fourth round.

Simon reached the semifinals at the Monte-Carlo Masters, defeating Janko Tipsarević and Jo-Wilfried Tsonga in the third round and quarterfinals, respectively. He lost in the semifinals to champion Rafael Nadal. Subsequently, he won the tournament in Bucharest, Romania, defeating Fabio Fognini in the final.

At the Masters 1000 event in Madrid, he lost in the third round to Janko Tipsarević. In Rome, he lost to David Ferrer in the third round. At the French Open, he again lost in the third round, to Stanislas Wawrinka in five sets. At Wimbledon, he lost in the second round to Xavier Malisse. In the third round of the US Open, he fell to Mardy Fish.

He made the semifinals at the Paris Masters where he lost to qualifier and eventual runner-up, Jerzy Janowicz, to close the year.

=== 2013: Eleventh ATP title ===
He started off the season once again at the Brisbane International where he was beaten in the quarterfinals by Marcos Baghdatis. At the 2013 Australian Open, he reached the fourth round before losing to Andy Murray. He also made it to the fourth round of the French Open, before losing to Roger Federer in five sets. At Wimbledon, he lost in the first round to Feliciano López. He missed the US Open due to illness.

In September, he won the Moselle Open for his 11th career title, beating Jo-Wilfried Tsonga in the final, in straight sets.

=== 2014: Late resurgence, second Masters 1000 final in Shanghai ===
Simon began his season at the Brisbane International with a shocking loss to world No. 147, Marius Copil, in the first round. He lost to Tsonga in the third round of the 2014 Australian Open after beating both Daniel Brands (saved seven match points) and Marin Čilić in five sets.

He lost to Andy Murray despite taking the first set and serving for the match in the second at 5–3 in the quarterfinals of the Abierto Mexicano. At the Rome Masters, Simon pushed world No. 1, Rafael Nadal, in three sets. He made to semifinals of the Open de Nice before falling to Federico Delbonis.

Simon made back-to-back grand slam third rounds in 2014 French Open and 2014 Wimbledon Championships. At the US Open, he pull off an upset against world No. 5, David Ferrer, in reach the fourth round, where he was defeated by eventual champion Marin Čilić in five sets. Simon reached the final of the Shanghai Masters, upsetting Stan Wawrinka, Tomáš Berdych and Feliciano López. He lost to Roger Federer in two tight tiebreak sets.

=== 2015: 12th ATP title, Wimbledon quarterfinal & return to the top 10 ===
Simon started 2015 slowly, losing to James Duckworth in Brisbane. He made the third round of the 2015 Australian Open, where he was defeated by David Ferrer. He reached the quarterfinals of the 2015 Open Sud de France, losing to Jerzy Janowicz. He then snapped his 12-match losing streak against Andy Murray in the quarterfinals of the 2015 ABN AMRO World Tennis Tournament. However, he was defeated by Tomáš Berdych in the semifinals. A week later, he won his second title at the Open 13 tournament in Marseille by defeating Gaël Monfils.

He reached the fourth round at Roland Garros, losing to eventual champion, Stan Wawrinka, in straight sets. He later reached his second grand slam quarterfinal at Wimbledon, defeating Monfils and Berdych before losing to Roger Federer.

In September, he made the final of the Moselle Open, where he was denied a third title at the tournament in a hard-fought final by Jo-Wilfried Tsonga, who took his third title at the tournament instead.

=== 2016: 400th win and semifinalist in Shanghai ===
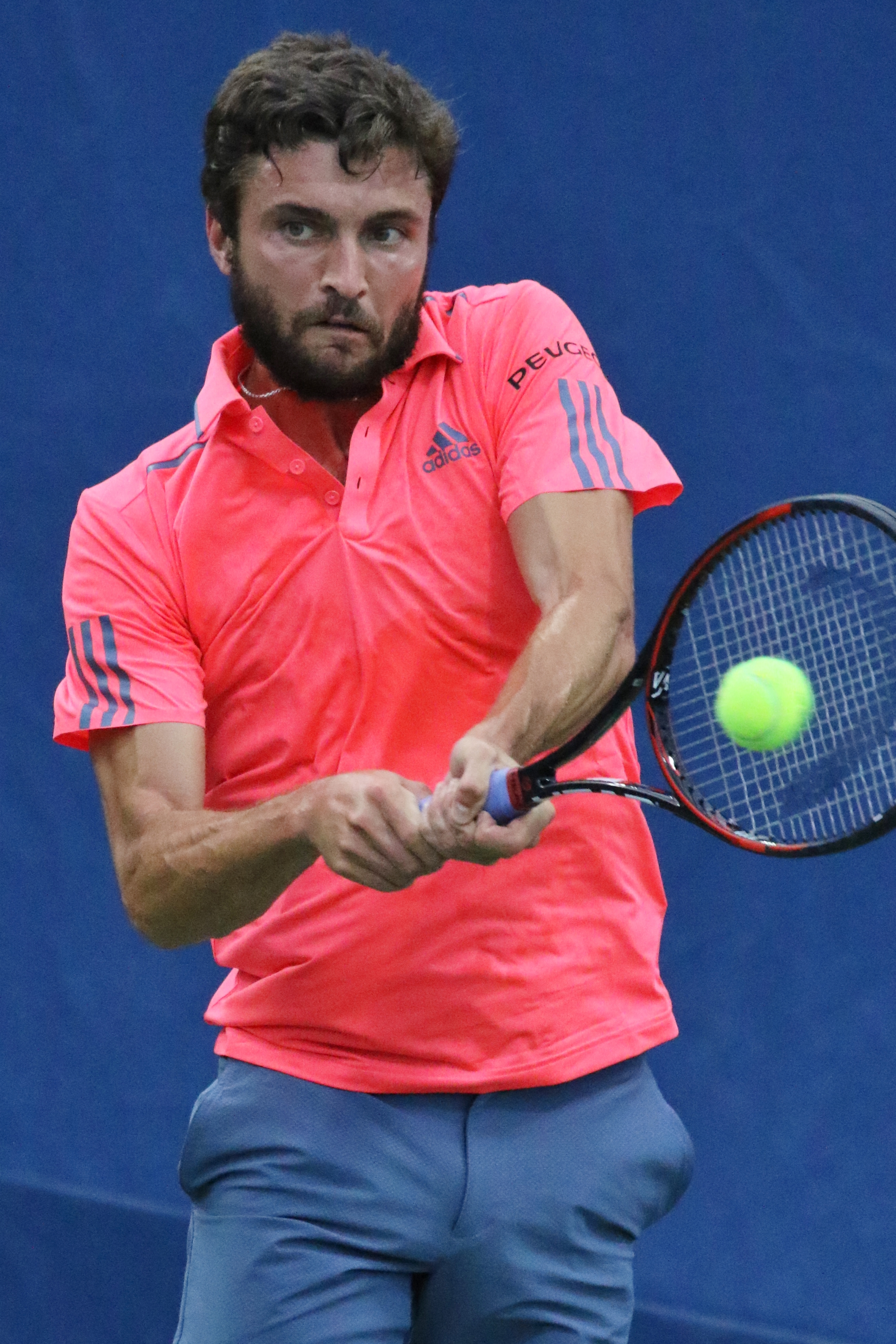
Simon at the 2016 US Open

Seeded No. 5, Simon lost in the first round of the World Tour 250 Series event in Brisbane to unseeded Grigor Dimitrov to start the year. Simon competed in the Australian Open, where he fell to world No. 1, Novak Djokovic, in the fourth round, following a straight-sets win against Federico Delbonis in the third round. In March, Simon lost in the quarterfinals of the Miami Open to David Goffin, having beaten world No. 11, Marin Čilić, in the third round. He lost in round three of the Masters 1000 events in Monte Carlo and Madrid to Stan Wawrinka and Andy Murray, respectively. Simon lost to Viktor Troicki in the third round of the French Open. That was the last ATP World Tour clay-court tournament of the first half of the year.

Unlike the first five months of the year, the grass-court season did not yield much success for Simon. Two grass-court warmup tournaments, Stuttgart and Queen's Club, saw premature defeats, both to much lower-ranked opponents. Simon, seeded no. 16, lost in the second round of Wimbledon to Grigor Dimitrov. After losing in the third round to Rafael Nadal at the Olympics, Simon (seeded No. 30) fell to Italian Paolo Lorenzi at the US Open in the second round. Simon, seeded No. 4, lost to top seed Dominic Thiem in the semifinals of the Moselle Open. At the Shanghai Masters, the unseeded Simon upset third seed Wawrinka in the third round for his 400th career match win before losing in the semifinals to Andy Murray, in straight sets – it was one of the last matches of the year that Murray played as the world No. 2 before he became No. 1 three weeks later on 7 November. Simon played his last ATP World Tour tournament of the year at the Paris Masters, where he upset tenth seed Roberto Bautista Agut in the second round, before losing to seventh seed Tomáš Berdych in the third round.

=== 2017: Finished outside the top 50 for the first time since 2005 ===
At the Australian Open, Simon (seeded No. 25) fell one round short of matching the previous year's performance, bowing out in the third round to third seed and eventual quarterfinalist Milos Raonic.

For the whole of 2017, he managed to progress beyond the round of 16 of the singles main draw in only two ATP World Tour tournaments – in Marseille (lost in the quarterfinals to Jo-Wilfried Tsonga) and Lyon (lost in the quarterfinals to Tomáš Berdych). At the Shanghai Masters, the unseeded Simon upset world No. 10, David Goffin, in the second round, before losing to unseeded Richard Gasquet in the third. Simon managed just a 16–25 singles win–loss record and finished the year outside the top 50 of the ATP singles rankings for the first time since 2005.

=== 2018: Two ATP singles titles & first doubles final ===
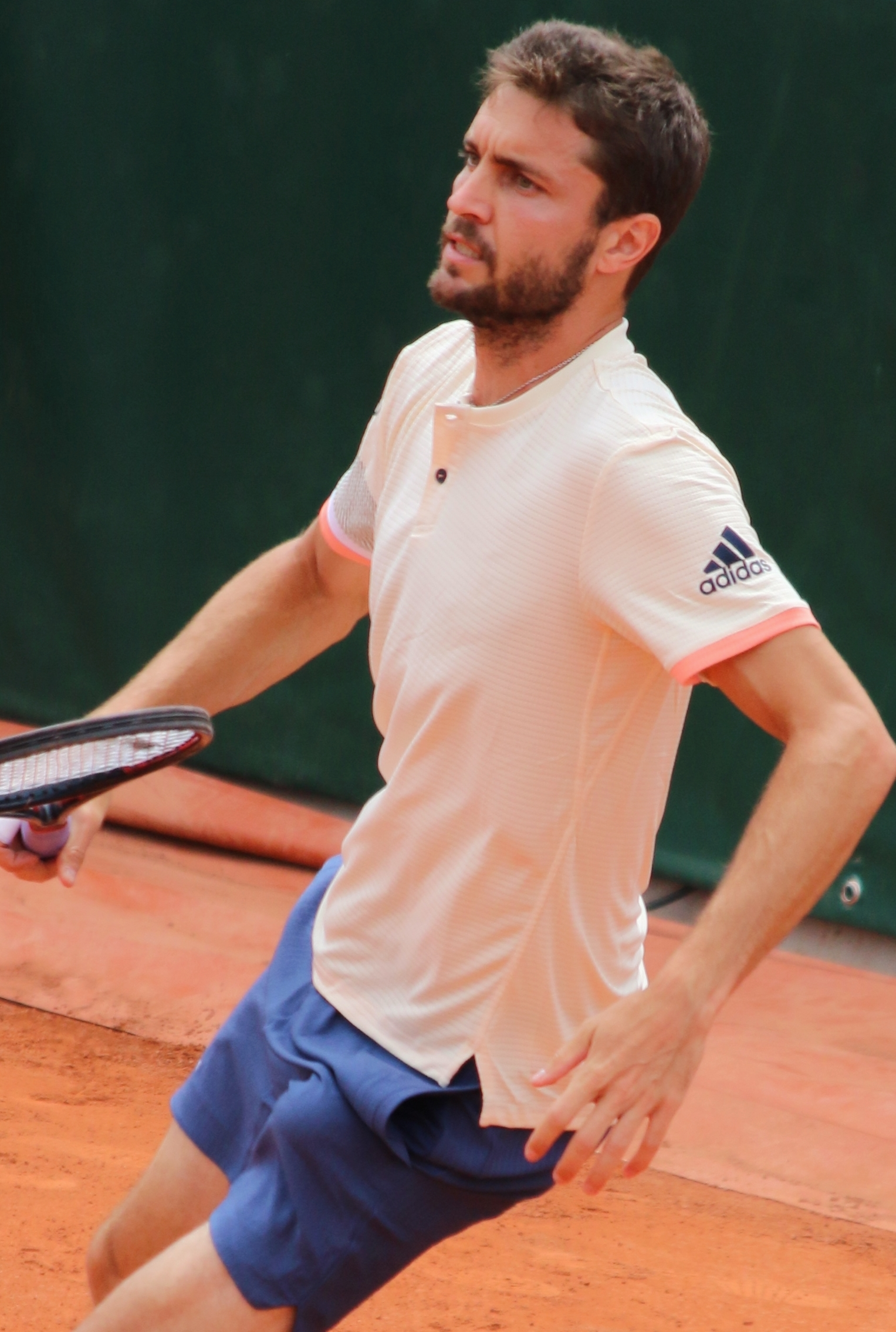
Simon at the 2018 French Open

In the opening week of the 2018 ATP World Tour, Simon won his 13th career ATP World Tour singles title and his first since the 2015 Open 13 in Marseille by defeating each of the top 3 seeds in the ATP World Tour 250 series tournament in Pune, India; he beat defending champion and third seed Roberto Bautista Agut in the second round, top seed Marin Čilić (ranked world No. 6) in the semifinals and Kevin Anderson in the final. Simon also reached his first career ATP World Tour doubles final in Pune; he and his French partner Pierre-Hugues Herbert lost in the doubles final to Robin Haase and Matwé Middelkoop. On 8 January (the first Monday after the end of the Pune tournament), Simon's ATP singles ranking and ATP doubles ranking improved from world No. 89 (7 days earlier) to No. 57 and from world No. 824 (7 days earlier) to No. 300, respectively. Simon lost his first-round match against Jared Donaldson in straight sets in his next tournament, at the Sydney International. At the Australian Open, he was forced to retire from his second-round match when he was trailing 2–6, 0–3 against the tenth seed Pablo Carreño Busta because of an injury to his left thigh muscles that he had sustained the week before in Sydney.

In the final of the Lyon Open against Dominic Thiem, Simon won the first set 6–3 and failed to convert a break point while leading 4–2 in the second set; that was the turning point of the match and Thiem recovered to defeat Simon 3–6, 7–6^{(2)}, 6–1.

Simon won his 14th ATP Tour singles title of his career in Metz, defeating Matthias Bachinger in the final.

=== 2019: Second ATP final on grass ===
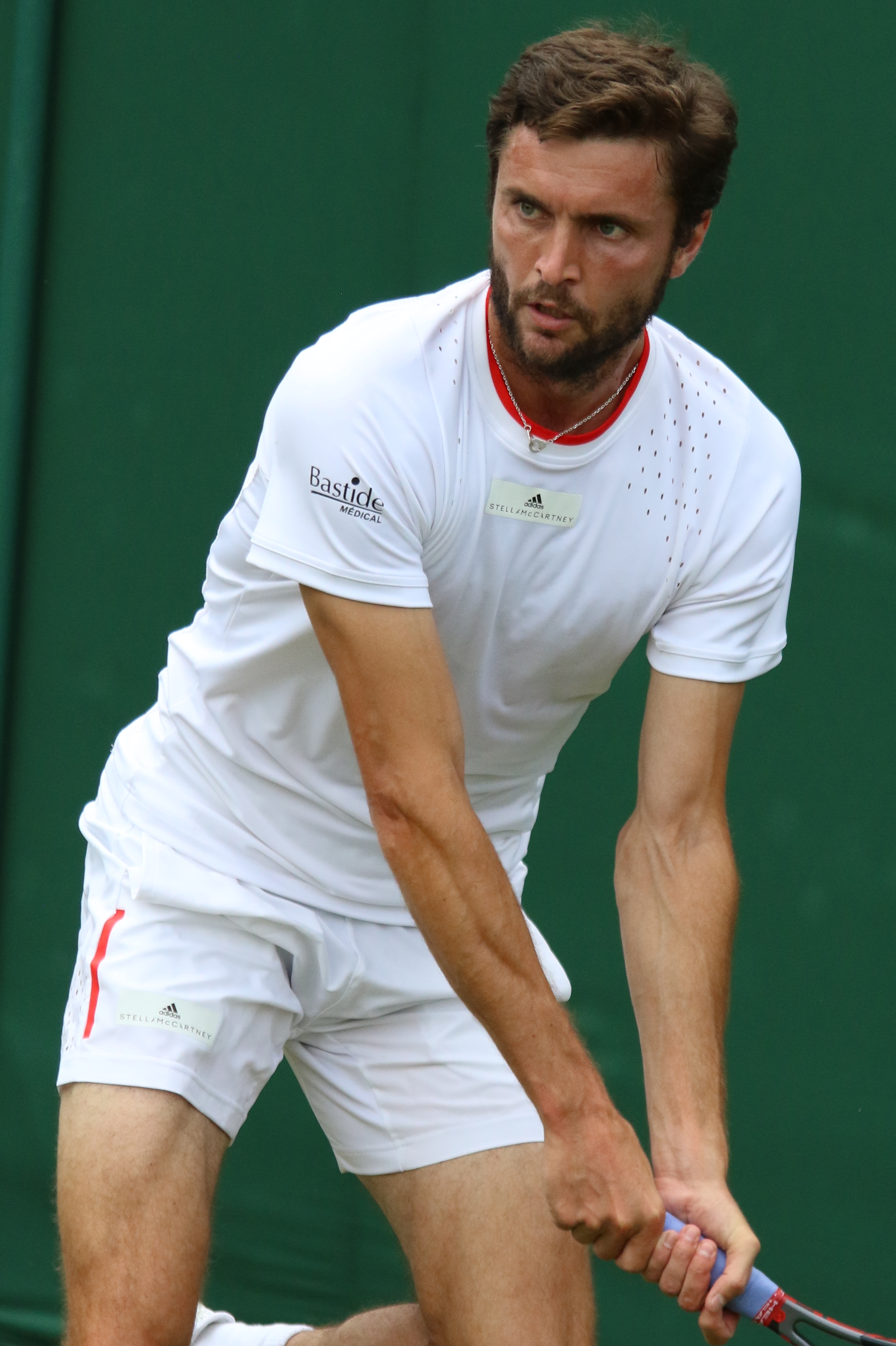
Simon at the 2019 Wimbledon Championships

Simon started his 2019 season at the Chennai Open. Seeded third and the defending champion, he reached the semifinals where he lost to top seed and world No. 6, Kevin Anderson, in a rematch of the final last year. Seeded fourth at the Sydney International, he made it to the semifinals where he was defeated by fifth seed, last year finalist, and eventual champion, Alex de Minaur. Seeded 29th at the Australian Open, he suffered a second-round loss at the hands of Australian wildcard Alex Bolt.

In February, Simon competed at the Open Sud de France. Seeded fourth, he lost in the second round to compatriot and eventual champion, Jo-Wilfried Tsonga. Getting past qualifying at the Rotterdam Open, he was eliminated in the first round by 2014 champion Tomáš Berdych. Seeded sixth and two-time champion at the Open 13, he reached the quarterfinals where he was beaten by third seed and world No. 24, David Goffin. In March, he played at the Indian Wells Open. Seeded 27th, he lost in the third round to seventh seed, world No. 8, and eventual champion, Dominic Thiem. Seeded 23rd at the Miami Open, he was defeated in the second round by Jérémy Chardy.

Simon started his clay-court season at the Grand Prix Hassan II in Marrakesh. Seeded fourth, he reached the semifinals where he lost to three-time champion Pablo Andújar. At the Monte-Carlo Masters, he withdrew from his second-round match against 13th seed and world No. 18, Fabio Fognini, due to a back injury. Seeded 11th at the Barcelona Open, he lost in the second round to Mackenzie McDonald. In Madrid, he fell in the first round to qualifier Hugo Dellien. At the Italian Open, he lost in the first round to Philipp Kohlschreiber. Seeded 26th at the French Open, he was defeated in the second round by Italian qualifier Salvatore Caruso.

Simon started his grass-court season at the Stuttgart Open. He lost in the second round to seventh seed, world No. 21, and eventual finalist, Félix Auger-Aliassime.

=== 2020: Fifth semifinal at the Open 13, struggles in COVID season ===
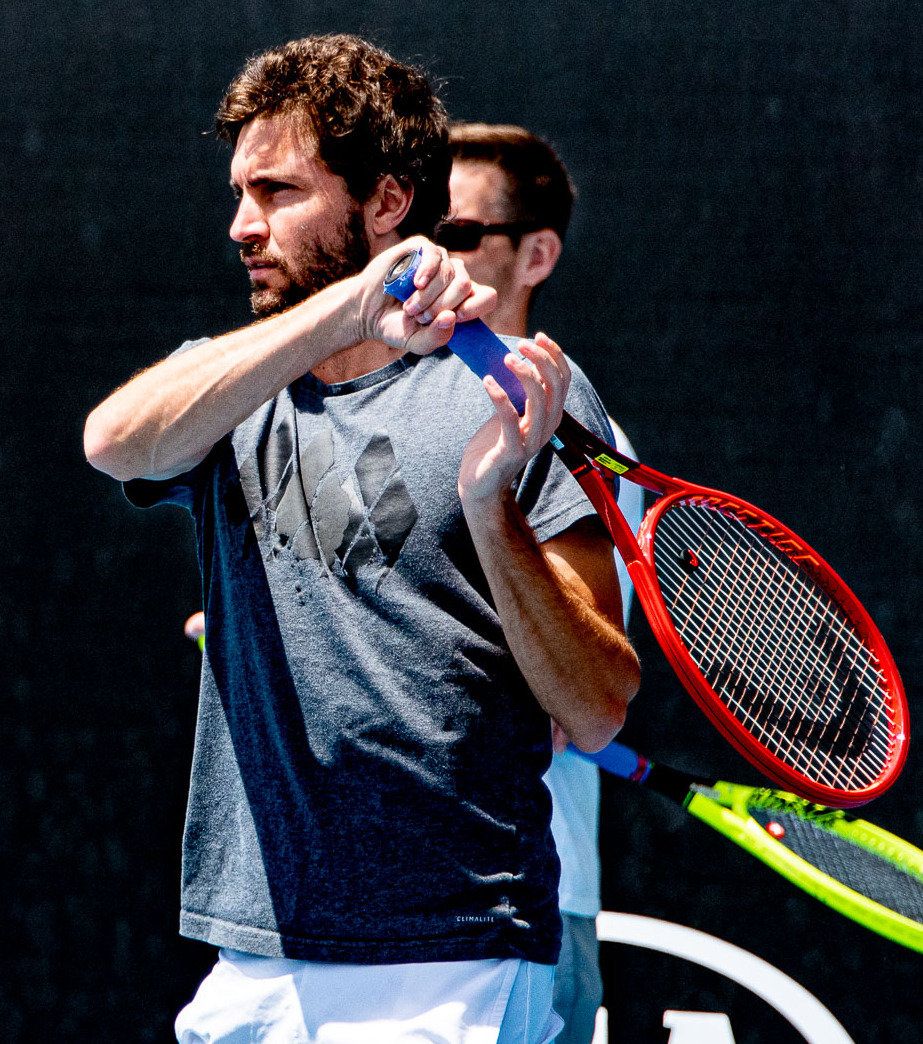
Simon on the practice court at the 2020 Australian Open

Simon started his 2020 season by representing France at the first edition of the ATP Cup. France was in Group A alongside Chile, Serbia, and South Africa. France defeated Chile 2–1. France lost to Serbia 1–2. In the final tie, he beat Lloyd Harris of South Africa. Despite his win over Harris, France lost the final tie to South Africa 1–2. In the end, France ended third in Group A. At the Adelaide International, he lost in the first round to Jérémy Chardy. Ranked 61 at the Australian Open, he was eliminated in the second round by 23rd seed, world No. 26, and Australian Nick Kyrgios.

After the Australian Open, Simon competed at the Open Sud de France. He lost in the first round to compatriot and four-time champion, Richard Gasquet. In Rotterdam, he was beaten in the second round by third seed, world No. 9, compatriot, defending champion, and eventual champion, Gaël Monfils. At the Open 13 in Marseille, he upset top seed and world No. 5, Daniil Medvedev, in the quarterfinals to reach the semifinals for the fifth time in his career. He lost in his semifinal match to seventh seed and world No. 18, Félix Auger-Aliassime. He has won 29 matches at the tournament (29–11), more triumphs than he has earned at any other event. The ATP tour canceled all tournaments from March through July due to the Coronavirus pandemic.

When the ATP resumed tournament play in August, Simon played at the Western & Southern Open. This event normally took place in Cincinnati, Ohio, but was held at the USTA Billie Jean King National Tennis Center in New York City, in order to reduce unnecessary player travel by centralizing the tournament and the subsequent US Open in the same venue. He lost in the final round of qualifying to American Sebastian Korda. Ranked 52 at the US Open, he was defeated in the second round by 19th seed and world No. 25, Taylor Fritz.

After the US Open, Simon competed at the Open du Pays d'Aix, an ATP Challenger tournament in Aix-en-Provence, France. As the top seed, he was ousted from the tournament in the first round by Federico Gaio. At the Italian Open, he lost in the second round of qualifying to Dominik Koepfer. At the Hamburg Open, he fell in the final round of qualifying to Pablo Cuevas. However, he received entry into the main draw as a lucky loser. He was defeated in the first round by qualifier Jiří Veselý. Ranked 54 at the French Open, he lost in the first round to ninth seed and world No. 11, Denis Shapovalov in four sets.

After the French Open, Simon played at the Bett1Hulks Indoors. He lost in the second round to second seed and world No. 13, Roberto Bautista Agut. At the Bett1Hulks Championship, he upset third seed and world No. 12, Denis Shapovalov, in the second round. He was defeated in the quarterfinals by Italian wildcard Jannik Sinner in three sets, despite winning the second set 6–0. At the Paris Masters, he lost in the first round to Tommy Paul. Simon played his final tournament of the season at the Sofia Open. Getting past qualifying, he was defeated in the second round by sixth seed John Millman.

Simon ended the year ranked 63.

=== 2021: Hiatus, return & continued struggles, 4th Olympics, out of top 100 ===
Simon began his 2021 season at the first edition of the Murray River Open. He lost in the second round to Jérémy Chardy. At the Australian Open, he was defeated in the first round by fifth seed and world No. 6, Stefanos Tsitsipas.

In Montpellier, Simon was eliminated in his first-round match by Dennis Novak. After suffering that first-round defeat, he announced that he would be stepping away from the tour for an undetermined period of time because his heart wasn't in it and also for his mental health.

Simon returned to action in April at the Sardegna Open. He was beaten in the second round by third seed and eventual champion, Lorenzo Sonego. At the Barcelona Open, he lost in the first round to Pablo Andújar. At the Estoril Open, he fell in the first round to compatriot Pierre-Hugues Herbert. In Lyon, he lost in the first round to Aljaž Bedene. At the first edition of the Emilia-Romagna Open, he was defeated in the first round by qualifier Pedro Martínez. Ranked 69 at the French Open, he lost in the first round to Márton Fucsovics.

=== 2022: Roland Garros & Paris third rounds, 500th career & 300th hardcourt wins, retirement ===
Simon started his 2022 season at the Traralgon International, an ATP Challenger Tour tournament. As the top seed, he reached the quarterfinals but lost to 12th seed Jesper de Jong. At the Australian Open, where he was competing for the 17th time, he fell in the first round of qualifying to Australian Edward Winter. In Montpellier he defeated Lucas Pouille for his 498th match win of his career, after qualifying into the main draw.

He announced his retirement on social media on 7 May 2022, stating that 2022 will be his last year on the tour.

Ranked No. 158, Simon received a wildcard to participate in the main draw at the 2022 French Open for the 17th time in the past 18 years. In the first round he won against World No. 18 and 16 seed Pablo Carreño Busta in a close to a 4 hours five sets match (his 35th of his career) for what was his 499th win on the tour. He went one step further to reach the third round with a defeat over Steve Johnson in straight sets for his 500th career match win. He became the 11th active player to reach this milestone and the 56th overall. Simon then lost in the third round to Marin Čilić] in what was his last match at Roland Garros.

At the 2022 Moselle Open, he defeated David Goffin to record his 502th match win and extend his 22–9 winning record in Metz. Ranked No. 195 he received a wildcard to make his 16th appearance in his home tournament, the Paris Masters, which was to be the final tournament in his career. He won his first-round match defeating former world No. 1, Andy Murray, in a close to 3 hours match in three tight sets to earn his 503rd win of his 20-year career. It was his 300th hard court win in his career, making him the 24th man to reach that milestone in the Open Era, and just the ninth active men's player. In the second round, he managed to beat world No. 11 and ninth seed, Taylor Fritz, in a three tight sets match that lasted 3 hours and 5 minutes. However, he lost in the round of 16 in his final match to world No. 8, Félix Auger-Aliassime, finishing his career inside the top 150.

== Coaching team and equipment ==
Simon plays with a Head YouTek IG Prestige MP and 2009 Team series bag, both from Head, a brand which he has endorsed. His racquet is strung with Head IntelliTour 16 String. He is sponsored by Adidas for his clothing.

In September 2012, Simon parted ways with his longtime coach Thierry Tulasne, whom he had worked with since February 2007. He played without a coach prior to adding Étienne Laforgue to his team. His fitness trainer is Paul Quetin.

== Significant finals ==
=== ATP World Tour Masters 1000 finals ===
==== Singles: 2 (2 runner-ups) ====
Outcome	Year	Championship	Surface	Opponent	Score
Loss	2008	Madrid Open	Hard (i)	(United Kingdom) Andy Murray	4–6, 6–7^{(6–8)}
Loss	2014	Shanghai Masters	Hard	(Switzerland) Roger Federer	6–7^{(6–8)}, 6–7^{(2–7)}

== ATP Tour finals ==
=== Singles: 22 (14 titles, 8 runner-ups) ===
Legend Grand Slam (0–0) ATP Masters 1000 (0–2) ATP 500 Series (1–1) ATP 250 Series (13–5)	Finals by surface Hard (9–4) Clay (5–2) Grass (0–2)	Finals by setting Outdoor (8–5) Indoor (6–3)

Result	W–L	Date	Tournament	Tier	Surface	Opponent	Score
Loss	0–1	Apr 2006	Valencia Open, Spain	International	Clay	(Spain) Nicolás Almagro	2–6, 3–6
Win	1–1	Feb 2007	Open 13, France	International	Hard (i)	(Cyprus) Marcos Baghdatis	6–4, 7–6^{(7–3)}
Win	2–1	Sep 2007	Romanian Open, Romania	International	Clay	(Romania) Victor Hănescu	4–6, 6–3, 6–2
Win	3–1	May 2008	Grand Prix Hassan II, Morocco	International	Clay	(France) Julien Benneteau	7–5, 6–2
Win	4–1	Jul 2008	Indianapolis Championships, US	International	Hard	(Russia) Dmitry Tursunov	6–4, 6–4
Win	5–1	Sep 2008	Romanian Open, Romania (2)	International	Clay	(Spain) Carlos Moyá	6–3, 6–4
Loss	5–2	Oct 2008	Madrid Open, Spain	Masters	Hard (i)	(United Kingdom) Andy Murray	4–6, 6–7^{(6–8)}
Win	6–2	Oct 2009	Thailand Open, Thailand	250 Series	Hard (i)	(Serbia) Viktor Troicki	7–5, 6–3
Win	7–2	Sep 2010	Moselle Open, France	250 Series	Hard (i)	(Germany) Mischa Zverev	6–3, 6–2
Win	8–2	Jan 2011	Sydney International, Australia	250 Series	Hard	(Serbia) Viktor Troicki	7–5, 7–6^{(7–4)}
Win	9–2	Jul 2011	German Open, Germany	500 Series	Clay	(Spain) Nicolás Almagro	6–4, 4–6, 6–4
Win	10–2	Apr 2012	Romanian Open, Romania (3)	250 Series	Clay	(Italy) Fabio Fognini	6–4, 6–3
Loss	10–3	Sep 2012	Thailand Open, Thailand	250 Series	Hard (i)	(France) Richard Gasquet	2–6, 1–6
Loss	10–4	Jun 2013	Eastbourne International, UK	250 Series	Grass	(Spain) Feliciano López	6–7^{(2–7)}, 7–6^{(7–5)}, 0–6
Win	11–4	Sep 2013	Moselle Open, France (2)	250 Series	Hard (i)	(France) Jo-Wilfried Tsonga	6–4, 6–3
Loss	11–5	Oct 2014	Shanghai Masters, China	Masters 1000	Hard	(Switzerland) Roger Federer	6–7^{(6–8)}, 6–7^{(2–7)}
Win	12–5	Feb 2015	Open 13, France (2)	250 Series	Hard (i)	(France) Gaël Monfils	6–4, 1–6, 7–6^{(7–4)}
Loss	12–6	Sep 2015	Moselle Open, France	250 Series	Hard (i)	(France) Jo-Wilfried Tsonga	6–7^{(5–7)}, 6–1, 2–6
Win	13–6	Jan 2018	Maharashtra Open, India	250 Series	Hard	(South Africa) Kevin Anderson	7–6^{(7–4)}, 6–2
Loss	13–7	May 2018	Lyon Open, France	250 Series	Clay	(Austria) Dominic Thiem	6–3, 6–7^{(2–7)}, 1–6
Win	14–7	Sep 2018	Moselle Open, France (3)	250 Series	Hard (i)	(Germany) Matthias Bachinger	7–6^{(7–2)}, 6–1
Loss	14–8	Jun 2019	Queen's Club Championships, UK	500 Series	Grass	(Spain) Feliciano López	2–6, 7–6^{(7–4)}, 6–7^{(2–7)}

=== Doubles: 1 (runner-up) ===
Legend Grand Slam (0–0) ATP Masters 1000 (0–0) ATP 500 Series (0–0) ATP 250 Series (0–1)	Finals by surface Hard (0–1) Clay (0–0) Grass (0–0)	Finals by setting Outdoor (0–1) Indoor (0–0)

Result	Date	Tournament	Tier	Surface	Partner	Opponents	Score
Loss	Jan 2018	Maharashtra Open, India	250 Series	Hard	(France) Pierre-Hugues Herbert	(Netherlands) Robin Haase (Netherlands) Matwé Middelkoop	6–7^{(5–7)}, 6–7^{(5–7)}

== Performance timelines ==
Key
W	F	SF	QF	#R	RR	Q#	P#	DNQ	A	Z#	PO	G	S	B	NMS	NTI	P	NH

(W) winner; (F) finalist; (SF) semifinalist; (QF) quarterfinalist; (#R) rounds 4, 3, 2, 1; (RR) round-robin stage; (Q#) qualification round; (P#) preliminary round; (DNQ) did not qualify; (A) absent; (Z#) Davis/Fed Cup Zonal Group (with number indication) or (PO) play-off; (G) gold, (S) silver or (B) bronze Olympic/Paralympic medal; (NMS) not a Masters tournament; (NTI) not a Tier I tournament; (P) postponed; (NH) not held; (SR) strike rate (events won / competed); (W–L) win–loss record.
To avoid confusion and double counting, these charts are updated at the conclusion of a tournament or when the player's participation has ended.

=== Singles ===
Tournament	2004	2005	2006	2007	2008	2009	2010	2011	2012	2013	2014	2015	2016	2017	2018	2019	2020	2021	2022	SR	W–L	Win%
Grand Slam tournaments
Australian Open	A	Q3	3R	1R	3R	QF	A	2R	2R	4R	3R	3R	4R	3R	2R	2R	2R	1R	Q1	0 / 15	25–15	63%
French Open	Q1	1R	1R	2R	1R	3R	A	4R	3R	4R	3R	4R	3R	1R	3R	2R	1R	1R	3R	0 / 17	23–17	57%
Wimbledon	A	Q3	1R	2R	3R	4R	3R	3R	2R	1R	3R	QF	2R	2R	4R	2R	NH	1R	Q1	0 / 15	22–15	59%
US Open	Q1	Q1	2R	2R	3R	3R	3R	4R	3R	A	4R	1R	2R	1R	2R	2R	2R	A	Q2	0 / 14	20–14	59%
Win–loss	0–0	0–1	3–4	3–4	6–4	11–4	3–2	9–4	6–4	6–3	9–4	9–4	7–4	3–4	7–4	4–4	2–3	0–3	2–1	0 / 61	90–61	60%
Year-end championships
ATP Finals	Did not qualify				SF	Did not qualify														0 / 1	2–2	50%
Olympic Games
Summer Olympics	A	NH			3R	NH			3R	NH			3R	NH				1R	NH	0 / 4	6–4	60%
ATP Masters 1000
Indian Wells Masters	A	A	A	3R	2R	3R	2R	3R	QF	4R	2R	4R	3R	A	1R	3R	NH	A	A	0 / 12	14–12	54%
Miami Masters	A	A	1R	2R	1R	4R	2R	QF	4R	QF	2R	4R	QF	2R	1R	2R	NH	A	1R	0 / 15	16–15	52%
Monte-Carlo Masters	A	A	3R	1R	1R	2R	A	3R	SF	1R	1R	3R	3R	2R	2R	2R (Note: Simon withdrew from his second-round match at the 2019 Monte-Carlo against Fabio Fognini (so doesn't count as a loss).)	NH	A	A	0 / 13	15–12	56%
Madrid Masters (Note: Held as Hamburg Masters (outdoor clay) until 2008, Madrid Masters (outdoor clay) 2009 – present.)	A	A	3R	2R	2R	3R	A	2R	3R	3R	2R	A	3R	2R	A	1R	NH	A	A	0 / 11	14–11	56%
Rome Masters	A	A	A	3R	2R	3R	A	2R	3R	3R	2R	2R	A	1R	A	1R	Q2	A	A	0 / 10	11–10	52%
Canada Masters	A	A	1R	A	SF	3R	1R	1R	2R	1R	2R	2R	A	A	A	1R	NH	A	A	0 / 10	8–10	44%
Cincinnati Masters	A	2R	2R	Q1	2R	QF	1R	QF	A	1R	2R	1R	1R	A	A	1R	Q2	A	A	0 / 11	10–11	48%
Shanghai Masters (Note: Held as Madrid Masters (indoor hard) from 2002 to 2008, and Shanghai Masters (outdoor hard) 2009 – present.)	A	A	A	A	F	QF	1R	3R	2R	1R	F	3R	SF	3R	1R	1R	NH			0 / 12	22–12	65%
Paris Masters	A	A	1R	2R	3R	3R	2R	2R	SF	3R	2R	3R	3R	1R	2R	1R	1R	Q1	3R	0 / 16	15–16	46%
Win–loss	0–0	1–1	5–6	7–6	14–9	13–9	1–6	12–9	17–8	10–9	9–9	11–8	14–7	4–6	2–5	2–8	0–1	0–0	2–2	0 / 110	124–109	53%
Career statistics
	2004	2005	2006	2007	2008	2009	2010	2011	2012	2013	2014	2015	2016	2017	2018	2019	2020	2021	2022	Career		
Tournaments	1	6	24	28	29	25	18	27	25	23	25	23	26	25	26	28	12	17	7	Career total: 395		
Titles	0	0	0	2	3	1	1	2	1	1	0	1	0	0	2	0	0	0	0	Career total: 14		
Finals	0	0	1	2	4	1	1	2	2	2	1	2	0	0	3	1	0	0	0	Career total: 22		
Overall win–loss	0–1	6–6	24–24	35–26	51–27	45–29	23–18	39–27	43–25	36–24	27–25	43–24	33–26	16–25	33–23	27–26	11–12	5–17	7–8	14 / 396	504–394	56%
Win (%)	0%	50%	50%	57%	65%	61%	56%	59%	63%	60%	52%	64%	56%	39%	59%	51%	48%	23%	47%	Career total: 56%		
Year-end ranking	174	124	45	29	7	15	41	12	16	19	21	15	25	89	30	55	63	124	143	$16,045,734		

=== Doubles ===
Tournament	2005	2006	2007	2008	2009	2010	2011	...	2019	2020	2021	W–L
Grand Slam tournaments
Australian Open	A	A	1R	2R	1R	A	1R		A	A	1R	1–5
French Open	2R	1R	1R	1R	A	A	A		A	A	A	1–4
Wimbledon	A	1R	1R	A	A	A	A		A	NH	A	0–2
US Open	A	1R	3R	1R	A	A	A		1R	A	A	1–4
Win–loss	1–1	0–3	1–4	1–3	0–1	0–0	0–1		0–1	0–0	0–1	3–15

== Wins over top 10 players ==
- He has a 34–94 record against players who were, at the time the match was played, ranked in the top 10.

Season	2006	2007	2008	2009	2010	2011	2012	2013	2014	2015	2016	2017	2018	2019	2020	Total
Wins	1	4	4	1	2	3	5	3	3	3	1	1	1	1	1	34

#	Player	Rank	Event	Surface	Rd	Score
2006
1.	(Argentina) Gastón Gaudio	9	Hamburg, Germany	Clay	2R	6–4, 3–6, 6–4
2007
2.	(Spain) Tommy Robredo	7	Indian Wells, United States	Hard	2R	6–7^{(0–7)}, 6–3, 6–0
3.	(United Kingdom) Andy Murray	10	Rome, Italy	Clay	1R	6–1, 1–6, 6–3
4.	(Russia) Nikolay Davydenko	4	Umag, Croatia	Clay	1R	6–2, 2–6, 6–3
5.	(Russia) Nikolay Davydenko	4	New Haven, United States	Hard	3R	6–4, 6–4
2008
6.	(Serbia) Novak Djokovic	3	Marseille, France	Hard (i)	2R	6–2, 6–7^{(6–8)}, 6–3
7.	(Switzerland) Roger Federer	1	Toronto, Canada	Hard	2R	2–6, 7–5, 6–4
8.	(Spain) Rafael Nadal	1	Madrid, Spain	Hard (i)	SF	3–6, 7–5, 7–6^{(8–6)}
9.	(Switzerland) Roger Federer	2	Tennis Masters Cup, Shanghai, China	Hard (i)	RR	4–6, 6–4, 6–3
2009
10.	(Russia) Nikolay Davydenko	8	Cincinnati, United States	Hard	3R	6–7^{(6–8)}, 6–4, 6–4
2010
11.	(United States) Andy Roddick	9	Washington, United States	Hard	3R	6–3, 6–3
12.	(Spain) Fernando Verdasco	7	Valencia, Spain	Hard	2R	6–1, 6–3
2011
13.	(United States) Mardy Fish	10	French Open, Paris, France	Clay	3R	6–3, 6–4, 6–2
14.	(France) Gaël Monfils	7	Hamburg, Germany	Clay	QF	6–4, 3–6, 6–0
15.	(Spain) David Ferrer	6	Cincinnati, United States	Hard	3R	6–4, 6–7^{(3–7)}, 6–4
2012
16.	(Serbia) Janko Tipsarević	8	Monte-Carlo, Monaco	Clay	3R	6–0, 4–6, 6–1
17.	(France) Jo-Wilfried Tsonga	5	Monte-Carlo, Monaco	Clay	QF	7–5, 6–4
18.	(Serbia) Janko Tipsarević	9	Bangkok, Thailand	Hard (i)	SF	6–4, 6–4
19.	(Serbia) Janko Tipsarević	9	Valencia, Spain	Hard (i)	2R	5–4 ret.
20.	(Czech Republic) Tomáš Berdych	9	Paris, France	Hard (i)	QF	6–4, 6–4
2013
21.	(Argentina) Juan Martín del Potro	7	Marseille, France	Hard (i)	QF	6–4, 6–3
22.	(Serbia) Janko Tipsarević	9	Miami, United States	Hard	4R	5–7, 6–2, 6–2
23.	(France) Jo-Wilfried Tsonga	8	Metz, France	Hard (i)	F	6–4, 6–3
2014
24.	(Spain) David Ferrer	5	US Open, New York	Hard	3R	6–3, 3–6, 6–1, 6–3
25.	(Switzerland) Stan Wawrinka	4	Shanghai, China	Hard	2R	5–7, 7–5, 6–4
26.	(Czech Republic) Tomáš Berdych	7	Shanghai, China	Hard	QF	7–6^{(7–4)}, 4–6, 6–0
2015
27.	(United Kingdom) Andy Murray	4	Rotterdam, Netherlands	Hard (i)	QF	6–4, 6–2
28.	(Canada) Milos Raonic	8	London, United Kingdom	Grass	QF	4–6, 6–3, 7–5
29.	(Czech Republic) Tomáš Berdych	6	Wimbledon, UK	Grass	4R	6–3, 6–3, 6–2
2016
30.	(Switzerland) Stan Wawrinka	3	Shanghai, China	Hard	3R	6–4, 6–4
2017
31.	(Belgium) David Goffin	10	Shanghai, China	Hard	2R	7–6^{(7–4)}, 6–3
2018
32.	(Croatia) Marin Čilić	6	Pune, India	Hard	SF	1–6, 6–3, 6–2
2019
33.	(South Africa) Kevin Anderson	8	London, UK	Grass	2R	6–1, 4–6, 6–4
2020
34.	(Russia) Daniil Medvedev	5	Marseille, France	Hard (i)	QF	6–4, 6–0

== ATP career earnings ==
Year	Grand Slam singles titles	ATP singles titles	Total singles titles	Singles Earnings ($)	Money list rank
2005	0	0	0	$147,393	140
2006	0	0	0	$378,760	68
2007	0	2	2	$560,655	38
2008	0	3	3	$1,425,489	7
2009	0	1	1	$1,128,735	15
2010	0	1	1	$532,413	58
2011	0	2	2	$1,327,336	12
2012	0	1	1	$1,067,732	18
2013	0	1	1	$1,034,185	17
2014	0	0	0	$1,260,732	N/A
2015	0	1	1	$1,437,082	17
2016	0	0	0	$1,209,502	29
2017	0	0	0	$666,046	73
2018	0	2	2	$1,141,864	44
2019	0	0	0	$1,151,768	46
2020	0	0	0	$477,266	70
2021	0	0	0	$358,008	137
2022	0	0	0	$370,820	152
Career	0	14	14	$16,045,734	49
