= 2008 Chennai Open =

- Date: 31 December – 6 January
- Edition: 13th
- Category: International Series
- Draw: 32S / 16D
- Prize money: $411,000
- Surface: Hard / outdoor
- Location: Chennai, India
- Venue: SDAT Tennis Stadium

Champions

Singles
- (Russia) Mikhail Youzhny

Doubles
- (Thailand) Sanchai Ratiwatana / (Thailand) Sonchat Ratiwatana
← 2007 ·	Chennai Open	· 2009 →

The 2008 Chennai Open was a men's tennis tournament played on outdoor hard courts. It was the 13th edition of the Chennai Open, and was part of the International Series of the 2008 ATP Tour. It took place at the SDAT Tennis Stadium in Chennai, India, from 31 December 2007 through 6 January 2008.

The singles draw was headlined by Association of Tennis Professionals (ATP) No. 2, three-time French Open champion and 2007 Chennai semifinalist Rafael Nadal, 2007 Paris Masters semifinalist Marcos Baghdatis, and 2007 US Open quarterfinalist and 2004 and 2005 Chennai winner Carlos Moyá. Also competing in the field were 2007 St. Petersburg semifinalist Mikhail Youzhny, 2007 Metz semifinalist Nicolas Mahut, Jürgen Melzer, Werner Eschauer and Marc Gicquel.

Fourth-seeded Mikhail Youzhny won the singles title.

== Notable stories ==
=== Longest three-setter ===
The semifinal that opposed fellow Majorcans Carlos Moyá and Rafael Nadal entered ATP Tour history as the longest three-setter since a 1993 Andrei Cherkasov win over Andrea Gaudenzi in Tel Aviv on the score of 6–7, 7–6, 7–5. Both matches lasted three hours and fifty-four minutes. Moya and Nadal's match featured three tie-breaks, with Moya looking on course for victory in the second set, gaining four match points, before Nadal caught up and won the set decider 10–8. An aggressive Moya kept coming to the net, while Nadal's passing shots kept him in the match. Moya had yet another opportunity to win as he served for the match at 5–4 in the third, but Nadal prevented him to capitalize again, eventually claiming a 6–7, 7–6, 7–6 victory. After the match Moya commented: "the crowd reaction was unbelievable, this is one of the things that motivates you to go on at 31 years of age." Nadal admitted it was an "emotional match" and said of Moya "I don't remember the last time I saw him play so well."

== Finals ==
=== Singles ===
(Russia) Mikhail Youzhny defeated (Spain) Rafael Nadal, 6–0, 6–1

- It was Mikhail Youzhny's 1st title of the year, and his 4th overall.

=== Doubles ===
(Thailand) Sanchai Ratiwatana / (Thailand) Sonchat Ratiwatana defeated (Cyprus) Marcos Baghdatis / (France) Marc Gicquel, 6–4, 7–5
