= 2006 Chennai Open – Doubles =

Doubles
- 2006 Chennai Open

Final
- Champions: (Slovakia) Michal Mertiňák (Czech Republic) Petr Pála
- Runners-up: (India) Prakash Amritraj (India) Rohan Bopanna
- Score: 6–2, 7–5

Events
Singles	Doubles
← 2005 ·	Chennai Open	· 2007 →

Rainer Schüttler and Yen-Hsun Lu were the defending champions. Schüttler partnered with Alexander Waske this year, losing in the semifinals. Lu did not participate.

Michal Mertiňák and Petr Pála won in the final 6–2, 7–5, against Prakash Amritraj and Rohan Bopanna.

== Seeds ==
1. (Czech Republic) Martin Damm / (India) Leander Paes (quarterfinals)
2. (Germany) Rainer Schüttler / (Germany) Alexander Waske (semifinals)
3. (Switzerland) Yves Allegro / (Germany) Michael Kohlmann (first round)
4. (Poland) Mariusz Fyrstenberg / (Poland) Marcin Matkowski (first round)

== Draw ==
=== Key ===
- Q = Qualifier
- WC = Wild card
- LL = Lucky loser
- Alt = Alternate
- SE = Special exempt
- PR = Protected ranking
- ITF = ITF entry
- JE = Junior exempt
- w/o = Walkover
- r = Retired
- d = Defaulted
- SR = Special ranking

=== Draw ===
First round
1	(Czech Republic) M Damm (India) L Paes	4	7^{7}	[10]
(Australia) A Fisher (United States) J Gimelstob	6	6^{3}	[3]
(Czech Republic) T Cibulec (Czech Republic) D Škoch	6^{4}	6	[8]
(Slovakia) M Mertiňák (Czech Republic) P Pála	7^{7}	3	[10]
4	(Poland) M Fyrstenberg (Poland) M Matkowski	6^{2}	6	[6]
(Czech Republic) J Vaněk (Chinese Taipei) Y-t Wang	7^{7}	2	[10]
(Belgium) D Norman (Belgium) K Vliegen	4	6	[8]
(South Korea) H-t Lee (Germany) B Phau	6	2	[10]
(Thailand) P Srichaphan (Czech Republic) R Štěpánek	6	4	[10]
(Luxembourg) G Müller (France) C Saulnier	4	6	[4]
WC	(India) P Amritraj (India) R Bopanna	6	6
3	(Switzerland) Y Allegro (Germany) M Kohlmann	2	2
(Czech Republic) L Dlouhý (Czech Republic) P Vízner	7	6
(Germany) T Behrend (Brazil) M Daniel	5	3
WC	(Australia) P Cash (India) K Rastogi	2	2
2	(Germany) R Schüttler (Germany) A Waske	6	6

Quarterfinals
1	(Czech Republic) M Damm (India) L Paes	6	3	[6]
(Slovakia) M Mertiňák (Czech Republic) P Pála	3	6	[10]
(Czech Republic) J Vaněk (Chinese Taipei) Y-t Wang	6	2	[8]
(South Korea) H-t Lee (Germany) B Phau	3	6	[10]
(Thailand) P Srichaphan (Czech Republic) R Štěpánek
WC	(India) P Amritraj (India) R Bopanna	w/o
(Czech Republic) L Dlouhý (Czech Republic) P Vízner	4	4
2	(Germany) R Schüttler (Germany) A Waske	6	6

Semifinals
(Slovakia) M Mertiňák (Czech Republic) P Pála	6	6
(South Korea) H-t Lee (Germany) B Phau	2	1
WC	(India) P Amritraj (India) R Bopanna	6	3	[11]
2	(Germany) R Schüttler (Germany) A Waske	1	6	[9]

Final
(Slovakia) M Mertiňák (Czech Republic) P Pála	6	7
WC	(India) P Amritraj (India) R Bopanna	2	5
