= 2004 Chennai Open – Doubles =

Doubles
- 2004 Chennai Open

Final
- Champions: (Spain) Rafael Nadal (Spain) Tommy Robredo
- Runners-up: (Israel) Jonathan Erlich (Israel) Andy Ram
- Score: 7–6^{(7–3)}, 4–6, 6–3

Events
Singles	Doubles
← 2003 ·	Chennai Open	· 2005 →

Rafael Nadal and Tommy Robredo defeated Jonathan Erlich and Andy Ram in the final, 7–6^{(7–3)}, 4–6, 6–3 win the Doubles title at the 2004 Chennai Open.

Julian Knowle and Michael Kohlmann were the defending champions, but lost in the quarterfinals to Mariusz Fyrstenberg and Marcin Matkowski.

== Seeds ==
1. (Israel) Jonathan Erlich / (Israel) Andy Ram (final)
2. (Austria) Julian Knowle / (Germany) Michael Kohlmann (quarterfinals)
3. (Australia) Jordan Kerr / (United States) Jim Thomas (first round)
4. (Czech Republic) Petr Luxa / (Czech Republic) David Škoch (quarterfinals)

== Draw ==
=== Key ===
- Q = Qualifier
- WC = Wild card
- LL = Lucky loser
- Alt = Alternate
- SE = Special exempt
- PR = Protected ranking
- ITF = ITF entry
- JE = Junior exempt
- w/o = Walkover
- r = Retired
- d = Defaulted
- SR = Special ranking

First round
1	(Israel) J Erlich (Israel) A Ram	6	6
(India) M Bhupathi (Russia) D Tursunov	3	1
(Spain) D Ferrer (Spain) R Ramírez Hidalgo	6	3	6
WC	(India) M Ghouse (India) H Mankad	4	6	3
4	(Czech Republic) P Luxa (Czech Republic) D Škoch	6	6
(Spain) G Blanco (Spain) A Montañés	1	3
WC	(India) P Amritraj (India) S Amritraj	4	7^{8}	3
(Spain) Á López Morón (Spain) A Portas	6	6^{6}	6
(Israel) H Levy (Belgium) T Vanhoudt	6^{2}	6	3
(France) T Ascione (Monaco) J-R Lisnard	7^{7}	0	6
(Spain) R Nadal (Spain) T Robredo	6	6^{4}	6
3	(Australia) J Kerr (United States) J Thomas	2	7^{7}	3
(Poland) M Fyrstenberg (Poland) M Matkowski	6	7^{7}
(United States) D Bowen (United States) P Goldstein	1	6^{3}
(Germany) K Braasch (Germany) A Popp	4	6	3
2	(Austria) J Knowle (Germany) M Kohlmann	6	4	6

Quarterfinals
1	(Israel) J Erlich (Israel) A Ram	6	6
(Spain) D Ferrer (Spain) R Ramírez Hidalgo	1	2
4	(Czech Republic) P Luxa (Czech Republic) D Škoch	2	1
(Spain) Á López Morón (Spain) A Portas	6	6
(France) T Ascione (Monaco) J-R Lisnard	1	7	2
(Spain) R Nadal (Spain) T Robredo	6	5	6
(Poland) M Fyrstenberg (Poland) M Matkowski	7	7^{7}
2	(Austria) J Knowle (Germany) M Kohlmann	5	6^{5}

Semifinals
1	(Israel) J Erlich (Israel) A Ram	6	6
(Spain) Á López Morón (Spain) A Portas	3	2
(Spain) R Nadal (Spain) T Robredo	6	6^{5}	6
(Poland) M Fyrstenberg (Poland) M Matkowski	4	7^{7}	3

Final
1	(Israel) J Erlich (Israel) A Ram	6^{3}	6	3
(Spain) R Nadal (Spain) T Robredo	7^{7}	4	6
