= 2001 Hamlet Cup – Doubles =

Doubles
- 2001 Hamlet Cup
- 2000 Champions: (United States) Jonathan Stark (Zimbabwe) Kevin Ullyett

Final
- Champions: (United States) Jonathan Stark (Zimbabwe) Kevin Ullyett
- Runners-up: (Czech Republic) Leoš Friedl (Czech Republic) Radek Štěpánek
- Score: 6–1, 6–4

Events
Singles	Doubles
← 2000 ·	Hamlet Cup	· 2002 →

Jonathan Stark and Kevin Ullyett were the defending champions and won in the final 6–1, 6–4 against Leoš Friedl and Radek Štěpánek.

== Seeds ==
Champion seeds are indicated in bold text while text in italics indicates the round in which those seeds were eliminated.

1. (South Africa) Chris Haggard / (Belgium) Tom Vanhoudt (quarterfinals)
2. (Argentina) Pablo Albano / (Argentina) Martín García (first round)
3. (Slovakia) Dominik Hrbatý / (United States) Scott Humphries (quarterfinals)
4. (Japan) Thomas Shimada / (South Africa) Myles Wakefield (first round)

== Draw ==
=== Key ===
- Q = Qualifier
- WC = Wild card
- LL = Lucky loser
- Alt = Alternate
- ITF = ITF entry
- PR = Protected ranking
- SR = Special ranking
- SE = Special exempt
- JE = Junior exempt
- JR = Junior Accelerator Programme entrant
- CO = College Accelerator Programme entrant
- NG = Next Gen Accelerator Program entrant
- w/o = Walkover
- r = Retired
- d = Defaulted

First round
1	(South Africa) **C Haggard** (Belgium) **T Vanhoudt**	**6**	**6**
WC	(Czech Republic) M Dvořáček (United States) M Williams	4	2
WC	(United States) L Jensen (United States) M Jensen	0	3
(Argentina) **L Arnold** (South Africa) **R Koenig**	**6**	**6**
3	(Slovakia) **D Hrbatý** (United States) **S Humphries**	**6**	1	**6**
(Australia) P Hanley (Australia) N Healey	2	**6**	4
WC	(Chile) J I Cerda (Brazil) R Grilli	3	4
(United States) **J Stark** (Zimbabwe) **K Ullyett**	**6**	**6**
(France) **A Clément** (Czech Republic) **P Luxa**	**7^{7}**	**7^{7}**
(Australia) W Arthurs (France) J Boutter	6^{2}	6^{5}
(South Africa) **M Barnard** (United States) **J Thomas**	6^{5}	**7^{11}**	**6**
4	(Japan) T Shimada (South Africa) M Wakefield	**7^{7}**	6^{9}	3
WC	(Chile) **M Ríos** (Czech Republic) **D Vacek**	**6**	**7^{7}**
(Brazil) J Oncins (Argentina) D Orsanic	4	6^{4}
(Czech Republic) **L Friedl** (Czech Republic) **R Štěpánek**	6^{5}	**6**	**6**
2	(Argentina) P Albano (Argentina) M García	**7^{7}**	3	4

Quarterfinals
1	(South Africa) C Haggard (Belgium) T Vanhoudt	**6**	5	3
(Argentina) **L Arnold** (South Africa) **R Koenig**	4	**7**	**6**
3	(Slovakia) D Hrbatý (United States) S Humphries	6^{4}	3
(United States) **J Stark** (Zimbabwe) **K Ullyett**	**7^{7}**	**6**
(France) **A Clément** (Czech Republic) **P Luxa**	**6**	**6**
(South Africa) M Barnard (United States) J Thomas	4	4
WC	(Chile) M Ríos (Czech Republic) D Vacek	4	3
(Czech Republic) **L Friedl** (Czech Republic) **R Štěpánek**	**6**	**6**

Semifinals
(Argentina) L Arnold (South Africa) R Koenig	4	4
(United States) **J Stark** (Zimbabwe) **K Ullyett**	**6**	**6**
(France) A Clément (Czech Republic) P Luxa	4	2
(Czech Republic) **L Friedl** (Czech Republic) **R Štěpánek**	**6**	**6**

Final
(United States) **Jonathan Stark** (Zimbabwe) **Kevin Ullyett**	**6**	**6**
(Czech Republic) Leoš Friedl (Czech Republic) Radek Štěpánek	1	4
