= 2008 Chennai Open – Doubles =

Doubles
- 2008 Chennai Open

Final
- Champions: (Thailand) Sanchai Ratiwatana (Thailand) Sonchat Ratiwatana
- Runners-up: (Cyprus) Marcos Baghdatis (France) Marc Gicquel
- Score: 6–4, 7–5

Events
| Singles | Doubles |
| ← 2007 · | Chennai Open | · 2009 → |

Xavier Malisse and Dick Norman were the defending champions, but Norman chose not to participate, and only Malisse competed that year.
Malisse competed with Gilles Müller, but lost in the first round to Igor Kunitsyn and Jim Thomas.

Sanchai Ratiwatana and Sonchat Ratiwatana won in the final 6–4, 7–5, against Marcos Baghdatis and Marc Gicquel.

== Seeds ==
1. (Switzerland) Yves Allegro / (France) Nicolas Mahut (quarterfinals)
2. (Czech Republic) Jaroslav Levinský / (Slovakia) Michal Mertiňák (quarterfinals)
3. (Austria) Jürgen Melzer / (Austria) Alexander Peya (first round)
4. (Czech Republic) Tomáš Cibulec / (Croatia) Lovro Zovko (first round)

== Draw ==
=== Key ===
- Q = Qualifier
- WC = Wild card
- LL = Lucky loser
- Alt = Alternate
- SE = Special exempt
- PR = Protected ranking
- ITF = ITF entry
- JE = Junior exempt
- w/o = Walkover
- r = Retired
- d = Defaulted
- SR = Special ranking

=== Draw ===
First round
1 | (Switzerland) Y Allegro (France) N Mahut | 6 | 6
(Australia) S Huss (United States) D Martin | 1 | 2
(Spain) R Nadal (Spain) B Salva-Vidal | 4 | 4
(Cyprus) M Baghdatis (France) M Gicquel | 6 | 6
4 | (Czech Republic) T Cibulec (Croatia) L Zovko | 3 | 6 | [10]
(Israel) H Levy (United States) R Ram | 6 | 4 | [12]
(Russia) I Kunitsyn (United States) J Thomas | 7 | 5 | [14]
(Belgium) X Malisse (Luxembourg) G Müller | 5 | 7 | [12]
(Thailand) S Ratiwatana (Thailand) S Ratiwatana | 6 | 7
(Russia) A Kudryavtsev (Russia) M Youzhny | 4 | 5
(Austria) W Eschauer (Germany) D Gremelmayr | 4 | 1
3 | (Austria) J Melzer (Austria) A Peya | 6 | 6
(Croatia) M Čilić (Pakistan) A-u-H Qureshi | 6 | 7^{7}
WC | (India) M Ghouse (India) K Rastogi | 4 | 6^{1}
WC | (India) S Amritraj (India) P Amritraj | 2 | 6^{4}
2 | (Czech Republic) J Levinský (Slovakia) M Mertiňák | 6 | 7^{7}

Quarterfinals
1 | (Switzerland) Y Allegro (France) N Mahut | 2 | 2
(Cyprus) M Baghdatis (France) M Gicquel | 6 | 6
(Israel) H Levy (United States) R Ram | 3 | 6 | [10]
(Russia) I Kunitsyn (United States) J Thomas | 6 | 3 | [6]
(Thailand) S Ratiwatana (Thailand) S Ratiwatana | 4 | 7 | [10]
3 | (Austria) J Melzer (Austria) A Peya | 6 | 5 | [3]
(Croatia) M Čilić (Pakistan) A-u-H Qureshi | 6 | 7
2 | (Czech Republic) J Levinský (Slovakia) M Mertiňák | 1 | 5

Semifinals
(Cyprus) M Baghdatis (France) M Gicquel | 6^{2} | 7 | [10]
(Israel) H Levy (United States) R Ram | 7^{7} | 6^{5} | [8]
(Thailand) S Ratiwatana (Thailand) S Ratiwatana | 2 | 6 | [10]
(Croatia) M Čilić (Pakistan) A-u-H Qureshi | 6 | 2 | [4]

Final
(Cyprus) M Baghdatis (France) M Gicquel | 4 | 5
(Thailand) S Ratiwatana (Thailand) S Ratiwatana | 6 | 7
