= 2002 TD Waterhouse Cup – Singles =

Singles
- 2002 TD Waterhouse Cup
- 2001 Champion: (Germany) Tommy Haas

Final
- Champion: (Thailand) Paradorn Srichaphan
- Runner-up: (Argentina) Juan Ignacio Chela
- Score: 5–7, 6–2, 6–2

Details
- Draw: 48
- Seeds: 16

Events
Singles	Doubles
← 2001 ·	TD Waterhouse Cup	· 2003 →

Tommy Haas was the defending champion but lost in the semifinals to Paradorn Srichaphan.

Srichaphan won in the final 5–7, 6–2, 6–2 against Juan Ignacio Chela.

== Seeds ==
A champion seed is indicated in bold text while text in italics indicates the round in which that seed was eliminated. All sixteen seeds received a bye to the second round.

1. (Germany) Tommy Haas (semifinals)
2. (Switzerland) Roger Federer (second round)
3. (United States) Pete Sampras (second round)
4. (Morocco) Younes El Aynaoui (quarterfinals)
5. (Spain) Àlex Corretja (semifinals)
6. (Germany) Rainer Schüttler (second round)
7. (Argentina) Juan Ignacio Chela (final)
8. (Ecuador) Nicolás Lapentti (second round)
9. n/a
10. (Argentina) Mariano Zabaleta (second round)
11. (Finland) Jarkko Nieminen (quarterfinals)
12. (Austria) Stefan Koubek (second round)
13. n/a
14. (France) Arnaud Clément (third round)
15. (France) Fabrice Santoro (second round)
16. (Argentina) Agustín Calleri (third round)
17. (Sweden) Jonas Björkman (third round)

== Draw ==
=== Key ===
- Q = Qualifier
- WC = Wild card
- LL = Lucky loser
- Alt = Alternate
- SE = Special exempt
- PR = Protected ranking
- ITF = ITF entry
- JE = Junior exempt
- w/o = Walkover
- r = Retired
- d = Defaulted
- SR = Special ranking

=== Finals ===
Semifinals
1	(Germany) Tommy Haas
(Thailand) **Paradorn Srichaphan**	**w/o**
5	(Spain) Àlex Corretja	2	**6**	4
7	(Argentina) **Juan Ignacio Chela**	**6**	2	**6**

Final
(Thailand) **Paradorn Srichaphan**	5	**6**	**6**
7	(Argentina) Juan Ignacio Chela	**7**	2	2

=== Top half ===
==== Section 1 ====
First round
Q	(Paraguay) **R Delgado**	**7**	4	**6**
(Brazil) A Sá	5	**6**	3
Q	(Sweden) M Norman	4	3
(United States) **V Spadea**	**6**	**6**
Q	(United States) **K Kim**	**6**	**6**
Q	(Germany) A Popp	2	4
(Spain) D Sánchez	**6**	4	2
(Brazil) **F Saretta**	3	**6**	**6**

Second round
1	(Germany) **T Haas**	1	**7^{7}**	**6**
Q	(Paraguay) R Delgado	**6**	6^{4}	4
(United States) V Spadea	2	3
16	(Argentina) **A Calleri**	**6**	**6**
11	(Finland) **J Nieminen**	4	**6**	**6**
Q	(United States) K Kim	**6**	3	1
(Brazil) **F Saretta**	**6**	**6**
6	(Germany) R Schüttler	3	2

Third round
1	(Germany) **T Haas**	4	**6**	**6**
16	(Argentina) A Calleri	**6**	2	1
11	(Finland) **J Nieminen**	2	**6**	**6**
(Brazil) F Saretta	**6**	3	4

Quarterfinals
1	(Germany) **T Haas**	3	**6**	**6**
11	(Finland) J Nieminen	**6**	4	2

==== Section 2 ====
First round
(Netherlands) **R Krajicek**	**6**	**6**
(Slovakia) D Hrbatý	1	2
(Czech Republic) **J Vacek**	**6**	**7^{7}**
(Italy) A Gaudenzi	4	6^{4}
(Czech Republic) **B Ulihrach**	**6**	**6**
Q	(Spain) F López	3	2
(Brazil) F Meligeni	1	3
(Thailand) **P Srichaphan**	**6**	**6**

Second round
4	(Morocco) **Y El Aynaoui**	5	**7^{7}**	**6**
(Netherlands) R Krajicek	**7**	6^{5}	4
(Czech Republic) J Vacek	2	3
14	(France) **A Clément**	**6**	**6**
10	(Argentina) M Zabaleta	4	4
(Czech Republic) **B Ulihrach**	**6**	**6**
(Thailand) **P Srichaphan**	**7^{8}**	**7**
8	(Ecuador) N Lapentti	6^{6}	5

Third round
4	(Morocco) **Y El Aynaoui**	**6**	**6**
14	(France) A Clément	0	2
(Czech Republic) B Ulihrach	4	1
(Thailand) **P Srichaphan**	**6**	**6**

Quarterfinals
4	(Morocco) Y El Aynaoui	**7**	3	4
(Thailand) **P Srichaphan**	5	**6**	**6**

=== Bottom half ===
==== Section 3 ====
First round
LL	(Spain) F Clavet	2	1
(Romania) **A Voinea**	**6**	**6**
Q	(Australia) P Hanley	4	5
LL	(Hungary) **A Sávolt**	**6**	**7**
(Spain) A Montañés	6^{2}	2
(Spain) **A Martín**	**7^{7}**	**6**
(France) **P-H Mathieu**	**6**	**7^{7}**
WC	(Argentina) G Coria	1	6^{4}

Second round
5	(Spain) **À Corretja**	3	**7^{7}**	**6**
(Romania) A Voinea	**6**	6^{5}	4
LL	(Hungary) A Sávolt	6^{7}	r
17	(Sweden) **J Björkman**	**7^{9}**
15	(France) F Santoro	4	6^{4}
(Spain) **A Martín**	**6**	**7^{7}**
(France) **P-H Mathieu**	**6**	6^{7}	**6**
3	(United States) P Sampras	3	**7^{9}**	4

Third round
5	(Spain) **À Corretja**	5	**6**	**6**
17	(Sweden) J Björkman	**7**	4	3
(Spain) A Martín	**6**	3	6^{3}
(France) **P-H Mathieu**	2	**6**	**7^{7}**

Quarterfinals
5	(Spain) **À Corretja**	**5**
(France) P-H Mathieu	2	r

==== Section 4 ====
First round
(France) J Golmard	2	6^{3}
WC	(United States) **J Morrison**	**6**	**7^{7}**
(United States) **J-M Gambill**	**7**	**6**
(France) J Boutter	5	4
(Belgium) O Rochus	4	**6**	3
WC	(United States) **M Fish**	**6**	1	**6**
(Chile) **N Massú**	**6**	**7^{7}**
LL	(Netherlands) R Sluiter	4	6^{4}

Second round
7	(Argentina) **J I Chela**	**6**	**6**
WC	(United States) J Morrison	4	3
(United States) **J-M Gambill**	**6**	3	**6**
12	(Austria) S Koubek	4	**6**	2
LL	(Georgia (country)) I Labadze	4	3
WC	(United States) **M Fish**	**6**	**6**
(Chile) **N Massú**	6^{5}	**6**	**6**
WC/2	(Switzerland) R Federer	**7^{7}**	1	3

Third round
7	(Argentina) **J I Chela**	**7**	**7^{7}**
(United States) J-M Gambill	5	6^{5}
WC	(United States) **M Fish**	**6**	**6**
(Chile) N Massú	3	4

Quarterfinals
7	(Argentina) **J I Chela**	**7**	**6**
WC	(United States) M Fish	5	3
