= 2003 Tata Open – Doubles =

Doubles
- 2003 Tata Open

Final
- Champions: (Austria) Julian Knowle (Germany) Michael Kohlmann
- Runners-up: (Czech Republic) František Čermák (Czech Republic) Leoš Friedl
- Score: 7–6^{(7–1)}, 7–6^{(7–3)}

Events
Singles	Doubles
← 2002 ·	Tata Open	· 2004 →

Mahesh Bhupathi and Leander Paes were the defending champions but they competed with different partners that year, Bhupathi with Todd Woodbridge and Paes with David Rikl.

Paes and Rikl lost in the quarterfinals to Tomáš Cibulec and Ota Fukárek.

Bhupathi and Woodbridge lost in the semifinals to František Čermák and Leoš Friedl.

Julian Knowle and Michael Kohlmann won in the final 7–6^{(7–1)}, 7–6^{(7–3)} against Čermák and Friedl.

== Seeds ==
1. (India) Mahesh Bhupathi / (Australia) Todd Woodbridge (semifinals)
2. (India) Leander Paes / (Czech Republic) David Rikl (quarterfinals)
3. (Czech Republic) Petr Pála / (Czech Republic) Pavel Vízner (first round)
4. (Czech Republic) František Čermák / (Czech Republic) Leoš Friedl (final)

== Draw ==
=== Key ===
- Q = Qualifier
- WC = Wild card
- LL = Lucky loser
- Alt = Alternate
- SE = Special exempt
- PR = Protected ranking
- ITF = ITF entry
- JE = Junior exempt
- w/o = Walkover
- r = Retired
- d = Defaulted
- SR = Special ranking

First round
1	(India) M Bhupathi (Australia) T Woodbridge	4	6	6
WC	(United States) J Gimelstob (Australia) M Philippoussis	6	3	2
WC	(India) P Amritraj (India) S Amritraj	4	6^{4}
(Germany) K Braasch (Germany) R Schüttler	6	7^{7}
4	(Czech Republic) F Čermák (Czech Republic) L Friedl	6	6
(Romania) A Pavel (Armenia) S Sargsian	2	4
(Argentina) G Cañas (Argentina) M García	4	6	7^{7}
(United States) D Bowen (Japan) T Shimada	6	2	6^{2}
(Austria) J Knowle (Germany) M Kohlmann	6	6
(Monaco) J-R Lisnard (France) M Llodra	4	4
(Spain) A Montañés (Spain) A Portas	6	5	6
3	(Czech Republic) P Pála (Czech Republic) P Vízner	3	7	4
(Germany) L Burgsmüller (Czech Republic) P Luxa	4	7	4
(Czech Republic) T Cibulec (Czech Republic) O Fukárek	6	5	6
(Sweden) S Aspelin (United States) J Thomas	4	5
2	(India) L Paes (Czech Republic) D Rikl	6	7

Quarterfinals
1	(India) M Bhupathi (Australia) T Woodbridge	6	6
(Germany) K Braasch (Germany) R Schüttler	2	1
4	(Czech Republic) F Čermák (Czech Republic) L Friedl	6	6
(Argentina) G Cañas (Argentina) M García	3	3
(Austria) J Knowle (Germany) M Kohlmann	6	6
(Spain) A Montañés (Spain) A Portas	3	0
(Czech Republic) T Cibulec (Czech Republic) O Fukárek	2	6	7^{10}
2	(India) L Paes (Czech Republic) D Rikl	6	3	6^{8}

Semifinals
1	(India) M Bhupathi (Australia) T Woodbridge	2	2
4	(Czech Republic) F Čermák (Czech Republic) L Friedl	6	6
(Austria) J Knowle (Germany) M Kohlmann	6	7
(Czech Republic) T Cibulec (Czech Republic) O Fukárek	4	5

Final
4	(Czech Republic) F Čermák (Czech Republic) L Friedl	6^{1}	6^{3}
(Austria) J Knowle (Germany) M Kohlmann	7^{7}	7^{7}
