= 2006 Chennai Open – Singles =

Singles
- 2006 Chennai Open

Final
- Champion: (Croatia) Ivan Ljubičić
- Runner-up: (Spain) Carlos Moyà
- Score: 7–6^{(8–6)}, 6–2

Details
- Draw: 32
- Seeds: 8

Events
Singles	Doubles
← 2005 ·	Chennai Open	· 2007 →

Ivan Ljubičić defeated two-time defending champion Carlos Moyà 7–6^{(8–6)}, 6–2 to win the 2006 Chennai Open singles event.

== Seeds ==
1. (Croatia) Ivan Ljubičić (champion)
2. (Czech Republic) Radek Štěpánek (semifinals)
3. (Spain) Carlos Moyà (final)
4. (Thailand) Paradorn Srichaphan (quarterfinals)
5. (Luxembourg) Gilles Müller (quarterfinals)
6. (Germany) Rainer Schüttler (second round)
7. (Germany) Björn Phau (quarterfinals)
8. (Germany) Tomas Behrend (second round)

== Draw ==
=== Key ===
- Q = Qualifier
- WC = Wild card
- LL = Lucky loser
- Alt = Alternate
- ITF = ITF entry
- PR = Protected ranking
- SR = Special ranking
- SE = Special exempt
- JE = Junior exempt
- JR = Junior Accelerator Programme entrant
- CO = College Accelerator Programme entrant
- NG = Next Gen Accelerator Program entrant
- w/o = Walkover
- r = Retired
- d = Defaulted

=== Finals ===
Semifinals
WC/1	(Croatia) Ivan Ljubičić	6	3	7^{8}
(Belgium) Kristof Vliegen	3	6	6^{6}
3	(Spain) Carlos Moyà	6	6^{5}	7^{7}
2	(Czech Republic) Radek Štěpánek	4	7^{7}	6^{3}

Final
WC/1	(Croatia) Ivan Ljubičić	7^{8}	6
3	(Spain) Carlos Moyà	6^{6}	2

=== Section 1 ===
First round
WC/1	(Croatia) I Ljubičić	7^{8}	7
(Spain) G García López	6^{6}	5
(Czech Republic) J Vaněk	6	6
WC	(India) V Uppal	3	1
Q	(India) R Bopanna	6	6
(France) C Saulnier	3	3
(Romania) R Sabău	2	6^{5}
5	(Luxembourg) G Müller	6	7^{7}
4	(Thailand) P Srichaphan	4	6	7^{7}
(Paraguay) R Delgado	6	1	6^{3}
(South Korea) H-T Lee	5	4
Q	(France) M Gicquel	7	6
(Taiwan) Y-T Wang	3	2
(Belgium) K Vliegen	6	6
(Spain) F Vicente	4	3
6	(Germany) R Schüttler	6	6

Second round
WC/1	(Croatia) I Ljubičić	6	3	6
(Czech Republic) J Vaněk	3	6	3
Q	(India) R Bopanna	3	4
5	(Luxembourg) G Müller	6	6
4	(Thailand) P Srichaphan	6	6^{5}	6
Q	(France) M Gicquel	3	7^{7}	2
(Belgium) K Vliegen	6	6
6	(Germany) R Schüttler	2	4

Quarterfinals
WC/1	(Croatia) I Ljubičić	6	6
5	(Luxembourg) G Müller	1	3
4	(Thailand) P Srichaphan	1	2
(Belgium) K Vliegen	6	6

Semifinals
WC/1	(Croatia) I Ljubičić	6	3	7^{8}
(Belgium) K Vliegen	3	6	6^{6}

=== Section 2 ===
First round
7	(Germany) B Phau	6	6
(United States) B Reynolds	3	0
(Czech Republic) L Dlouhý	6	3	2
Q	(Germany) M Berrer	3	6	6
(United States) J Gimelstob	6	6
(Germany) A Waske	2	2
(Belgium) D Norman	4	6	1
3	(Spain) C Moyà	6	3	6
8	(Germany) T Behrend	6	7
(Brazil) M Daniel	3	5
(France) T Ascione	7	6
(Germany) S Greul	5	1
WC	(India) P Amritraj	2	6	6
(Brazil) R Mello	6	2	3
Q	(Spain) I Navarro	4	6^{3}
2	(Czech Republic) R Štěpánek	6	7^{7}

Second round
7	(Germany) B Phau	1	6	6
Q	(Germany) M Berrer	6	2	4
(United States) J Gimelstob	6	3	4
3	(Spain) C Moyà	3	6	6
8	(Germany) T Behrend	4	1
(France) T Ascione	6	6
WC	(India) P Amritraj	6	0	4
2	(Czech Republic) R Štěpánek	3	6	6

Quarterfinals
7	(Germany) B Phau	4	6	1
3	(Spain) C Moyà	6	4	6
(France) T Ascione	3	4
2	(Czech Republic) R Štěpánek	6	6

Semifinals
3	(Spain) C Moyà	6	6^{5}	7^{7}
2	(Czech Republic) R Štěpánek	4	7^{7}	6^{3}
