= 2003 Tata Open =

- Date: 30 December 2002 – 5 January
- Edition: 8th
- Category: International Series
- Draw: 32S / 16D
- Prize money: $355,000
- Surface: Hard / outdoor
- Location: Chennai, India
- Venue: SDAT Tennis Stadium

Champions

Singles
- (Thailand) Paradorn Srichaphan

Doubles
- (Austria) Julian Knowle / (Germany) Michael Kohlmann
| ← 2002 · | Maharashtra Open | · 2004 → |

The 2003 Tata Open was a men's tennis tournament played on outdoor hard courts at the SDAT Tennis Stadium in Chennai, India and was part of the International Series of the 2003 ATP Tour. The tournament ran from 30 December 2002 through 5 January 2003. Second-seeded Paradorn Srichaphan won the singles title.

== Finals ==
=== Singles ===
(Thailand) Paradorn Srichaphan defeated (Slovakia) Karol Kučera 6–3, 6–1

- It was Srichaphan's 1st title of the year and the 3rd of his career.

=== Doubles ===
(Austria) Julian Knowle / (Germany) Michael Kohlmann defeated (Czech Republic) František Čermák / (Czech Republic) Leoš Friedl 7–6^{(7–1)}, 7–6^{(7–3)}

- It was Knowle's 1st title of the year and the 3rd of his career. It was Kohlmann's only title of the year and the 2nd of his career.
