= 2002 TD Waterhouse Cup =

- Date: August 19–25
- Edition: 22nd
- Category: International Series
- Draw: 48S / 16D
- Prize money: $455,000
- Surface: Hard / outdoor
- Location: Jericho, New York, US

Champions

Singles
- (Thailand) Paradorn Srichaphan

Doubles
- (India) Mahesh Bhupathi / (United States) Mike Bryan
← 2001 ·	Connecticut Open	· 2003 →

The 2002 TD Waterhouse Cup was a men's tennis tournament played on outdoor hard courts at the Hamlet Golf and Country Club in Jericho, New York in the United States and was part of the International Series of the 2002 ATP Tour. It was the 22nd edition of the tournament and ran from August 19 through August 25, 2002. Unseeded Paradorn Srichaphan won the singles title.

== Finals ==
=== Singles ===
(Thailand) Paradorn Srichaphan defeated (Argentina) Juan Ignacio Chela 5–7, 6–2, 6–2

- It was Srichaphan's 1st singles title of his career.

=== Doubles ===
(India) Mahesh Bhupathi / (United States) Mike Bryan defeated (Czech Republic) Petr Pála / (Czech Republic) Pavel Vízner 6–3, 6–4

- It was Bhupathi's 4th title of the year and the 25th of his career. It was Bryan's 6th title of the year and the 10th of his career.
