= 2005 Chennai Open – Singles =

Singles
- 2005 Chennai Open

Final
- Champion: (Spain) Carlos Moyà
- Runner-up: (Thailand) Paradorn Srichaphan
- Score: 3–6, 6–4, 7–6^{(7–5)}

Details
- Draw: 32
- Seeds: 8

Events
Singles	Doubles
← 2004 ·	Chennai Open	· 2006 →

Carlos Moyà was the defending champion and won in the final 3–6, 6–4, 7–6^{(7–5)} against Paradorn Srichaphan.

== Seeds ==
1. (Spain) Carlos Moyà (champion)
2. (Thailand) Paradorn Srichaphan (final)
3. (Germany) Rainer Schüttler (first round)
4. (Sweden) Jonas Björkman (second round)
5. (Denmark) Kenneth Carlsen (second round)
6. (Taiwan) Yen-Hsun Lu (second round)
7. (France) Grégory Carraz (first round)
8. (United States) Kevin Kim (second round)

== Draw ==
=== Key ===
- Q = Qualifier
- WC = Wild card
- LL = Lucky loser
- Alt = Alternate
- SE = Special exempt
- PR = Protected ranking
- ITF = ITF entry
- JE = Junior exempt
- w/o = Walkover
- r = Retired
- d = Defaulted
- SR = Special ranking

=== Finals ===
Semifinals
1	(Spain) Carlos Moyá	6	2	7^{7}
(Spain) Guillermo García López	4	6	6^{2}
(Czech Republic) Tomáš Zíb	6^{5}	3
2	(Thailand) Paradorn Srichaphan	7^{7}	6

Final
1	(Spain) Carlos Moyá	3	6	7^{7}
2	(Thailand) Paradorn Srichaphan	6	4	6^{5}

=== Top half ===
First round
1	(Spain) C Moyà	6	7^{7}
Q	(Austria) J Knowle	4	6^{4}
WC	(India) P Amritraj	4	4
(Switzerland) I Heuberger	6	6
(France) P-H Mathieu	6	6
(Serbia and Montenegro) J Tipsarević	3	4
(Israel) N Okun	6^{0}	4
5	(Denmark) K Carlsen	7^{7}	6
3	(Germany) R Schüttler	2	2
(France) O Patience	6	6
(Czech Republic) J Vaněk	2	6	6^{5}
(Czech Republic) M Tabara	6	4	7^{7}
(Spain) G García López	3	6	6
(Netherlands) D van Scheppingen	6	3	2
(Chile) A García	6	6
7	(France) G Carraz	4	3

Second round
1	(Spain) C Moyà	w/o
(Switzerland) I Heuberger
(France) P-H Mathieu	6	7
5	(Denmark) K Carlsen	3	5
(France) O Patience	6^{4}	4
(Czech Republic) M Tabara	7^{7}	6
(Spain) G García López	6	6
(Chile) A García	3	3

Quarterfinals
1	(Spain) C Moyà	6	6
(France) P-H Mathieu	4	4
(Czech Republic) M Tabara	4	4
(Spain) G García López	6	6

Semifinals
1	(Spain) C Moyà	6	2	7^{7}
(Spain) G García López	4	6	6^{2}

=== Bottom half ===
First round
8	(United States) K Kim	6	4	6
Q	(India) H Mankad	4	6	4
(Czech Republic) T Zíb	6	6
(Germany) L Burgsmüller	1	4
(United States) J-M Gambill	3	3
(United States) J Gimelstob	6	6
WC	(India) K Rastogi	4	0
4	(Sweden) J Björkman	6	6
6	(Taiwan) Y-H Lu	6	7^{7}
WC	(India) L Paes	2	6^{5}
(Spain) S Ventura	6^{6}	7	4
(Belgium) K Vliegen	7^{8}	5	6
Q	(France) N Devilder	6	6^{10}	7^{7}
Q	(Cyprus) M Baghdatis	4	7^{12}	6^{5}
(Belgium) C Rochus	6	6^{4}	1
2	(Thailand) P Srichaphan	4	7^{7}	6

Second round
8	(United States) K Kim	3	5
(Czech Republic) T Zíb	6	7
(United States) J Gimelstob	6	4	6
4	(Sweden) J Björkman	0	6	3
6	(Taiwan) Y-H Lu	6	5	6^{6}
(Belgium) K Vliegen	1	7	7^{8}
Q	(France) N Devilder	3	2
2	(Thailand) P Srichaphan	6	6

Quarterfinals
(Czech Republic) T Zíb	6	7^{7}
(United States) J Gimelstob	3	6^{4}
(Belgium) K Vliegen	3	4
2	(Thailand) P Srichaphan	6	6

Semifinals
(Czech Republic) T Zíb	6^{5}	3
2	(Thailand) P Srichaphan	7^{7}	6
