= 2005 Chennai Open =

Indian ATP tennis tournament in held in 2005

- Date: 3–10 January
- Edition: 10th
- Category: International Series
- Draw: 32S / 16D
- Prize money: $355,000
- Surface: Hard / outdoors
- Location: Chennai, India

Champions

Singles
- (Spain) Carlos Moyà

Doubles
- (Germany) Rainer Schüttler / (Taiwan) Yen-Hsun Lu
| ← 2004 · | Chennai Open | · 2006 → |

The 2005 Chennai Open was an ATP tennis tournament held in Chennai, India. The tournament was held from 3 to 10 January.

== Finals ==
=== Singles ===
(Spain) Carlos Moyà defeated (Thailand) Paradorn Srichaphan 3–6, 6–4, 7–6^{(7–5)}

- It was Moyà's only title of the year and the 18th of his career.

=== Doubles ===
(Germany) Rainer Schüttler/ (Taiwan) Yen-Hsun Lu defeated (India) Mahesh Bhupathi / (Sweden) Jonas Björkman 7–5, 4–6, 7–6^{(7–4)}

- It was Schüttler's only title of the year and the 6th of his career. It was Lu's only title of the year and the 1st of his career.
