= 2007 Chennai Open – Singles =

Singles
- 2007 Chennai Open

Final
- Champion: (Belgium) Xavier Malisse
- Runner-up: (Austria) Stefan Koubek
- Score: 6–1, 6–3

Details
- Draw: 32
- Seeds: 8

Events
Singles	Doubles
← 2006 ·	Chennai Open	· 2008 →

The 2007 Chennai Open Singles contest was an ATP Tour tennis tournament event held in Chennai, India from 1 January until 8 January 2007.

Xavier Malisse defeated Stefan Koubek 6–1, 6–3 to win the 2007 Chennai Open singles event.

== Seeds ==
1. (Spain) Rafael Nadal (semifinals)
2. (Argentina) David Nalbandian (first round)
3. (Belgium) Xavier Malisse (champion)
4. (France) Julien Benneteau (quarterfinals)
5. (Spain) Carlos Moyá (semifinals)
6. (France) Fabrice Santoro (quarterfinals)
7. (Thailand) Paradorn Srichaphan (second round)
8. (France) Nicolas Mahut (second round)

== Draw ==
=== Key ===
- Q = Qualifier
- WC = Wild card
- LL = Lucky loser
- Alt = Alternate
- SE = Special exempt
- PR = Protected ranking
- ITF = ITF entry
- JE = Junior exempt
- w/o = Walkover
- r = Retired
- d = Defaulted
- SR = Special ranking

=== Finals ===
Semifinals
1	(Spain) Rafael Nadal	4	6^{4}
3	(Belgium) Xavier Malisse	6	7^{7}
(Austria) Stefan Koubek	6	6
5	(Spain) Carlos Moyá	3	1

Final
3	(Belgium) Xavier Malisse	6	6
(Austria) Stefan Koubek	1	3

=== Section 1 ===
First round
1	(Spain) R Nadal	6	6
(Germany) R Schüttler	4	2
WC	(India) K Rastogi	6	6
(Brazil) T Alves	3	4
(Italy) D Sanguinetti	6	6
Q	(Greece) K Economidis	4	3
(Colombia) A Falla	5	4
8	(France) N Mahut	7	6
3	(Belgium) X Malisse	6	6
(Thailand) D Udomchoke	2	2
(Italy) S Galvani	6	6
(Chinese Taipei) L Yen-Hsun	2	3
(Germany) B Phau	6	6
(France) O Patience	4	4
Q	(Czech Republic) D Škoch	0^{r}
6	(France) F Santoro	3

Second round
1	(Spain) R Nadal	6	6
WC	(India) K Rastogi	4	1
(Italy) D Sanguinetti	7^{8}	3	6
8	(France) N Mahut	6^{6}	6	3
3	(Belgium) X Malisse	6	6
(Italy) S Galvani	3	2
(Germany) B Phau	4	2
6	(France) F Santoro	6	6

Quarterfinals
1	(Spain) R Nadal	6	6
(Italy) D Sanguinetti	3	2
3	(Belgium) X Malisse	6	4	6
6	(France) F Santoro	4	6	0

Semifinals
1	(Spain) R Nadal	4	6^{4}
3	(Belgium) X Malisse	6	7^{7}

=== Section 2 ===
First round
7	(Thailand) P Srichaphan	7^{7}	6
Q	(Italy) S Bolelli	6^{5}	4
(Austria) S Koubek	2	6	7
WC	(Spain) B Salva-Vidal	6	3	5
(Russia) I Andreev	6	7^{7}
Q	(Colombia) S Giraldo	3	6^{2}
(Russia) T Gabashvili	3	4
4	(France) J Benneteau	6	6
5	(Spain) C Moyá	7^{7}	6
(Germany) A Waske	6^{3}	3
(United States) K Kim	1	6	6
(Germany) S Greul	6	2	3
(Croatia) I Karlović	7^{7}	6
WC	(India) P Amritraj	6^{3}	3
(Denmark) K Pless	2	6	7
2	(Argentina) D Nalbandian	6	3	5

Second round
7	(Thailand) P Srichaphan	1	2
(Austria) S Koubek	6	6
(Russia) I Andreev	6^{4}	2
4	(France) J Benneteau	7^{7}	6
5	(Spain) C Moyá	6	6
(United States) K Kim	4	3
(Croatia) I Karlović	7^{7}	7^{7}
(Denmark) K Pless	6^{3}	6^{2}

Quarterfinals
(Austria) S Koubek	6	6
4	(France) J Benneteau	1	2
5	(Spain) C Moyá	6	7^{8}
(Croatia) I Karlović	4	6^{6}

Semifinals
(Austria) S Koubek	6	6
5	(Spain) C Moyá	1	1
