= 2003 Tata Open – Singles =

Singles
- 2003 Tata Open

Final
- Champion: (Thailand) Paradorn Srichaphan
- Runner-up: (Slovakia) Karol Kučera
- Score: 6–3, 6–1

Details
- Draw: 32
- Seeds: 8

Events
Singles	Doubles
← 2002 ·	Tata Open	· 2004 →

Guillermo Cañas was the defending champion but lost in the quarterfinals to Karol Kučera.

Paradorn Srichaphan won in the final 6–3, 6–1 against Kučera.

== Seeds ==
1. (Argentina) Guillermo Cañas (quarterfinals)
2. (Thailand) Paradorn Srichaphan (champion)
3. (Netherlands) ~~Sjeng Schalken~~ (withdrew because of a wrist injury)
4. (Argentina) Juan Ignacio Chela (semifinals)
5. (Romania) Andrei Pavel (first round)
6. (Germany) Rainer Schüttler (quarterfinals)
7. (Germany) Lars Burgsmüller (first round)
8. (Spain) Albert Montañés (second round)

== Draw ==
=== Key ===
- Q = Qualifier
- WC = Wild card
- LL = Lucky loser
- Alt = Alternate
- SE = Special exempt
- PR = Protected ranking
- ITF = ITF entry
- JE = Junior exempt
- w/o = Walkover
- r = Retired
- d = Defaulted
- SR = Special ranking

=== Finals ===
Semifinals
(Slovakia) Karol Kučera	6	7
4	(Argentina) Juan Ignacio Chela	3	5
(Monaco) Jean-René Lisnard	2	1
2	(Thailand) Paradorn Srichaphan	6	6

Final
(Slovakia) Karol Kučera	3	1
2	(Thailand) Paradorn Srichaphan	6	6

=== Top half ===
First round
1	(Argentina) G Cañas	4	6	6
(Belgium) D Norman	6	2	3
WC	(India) P Amritraj	2	2
(Czech Republic) J Vaněk	6	6
(United States) J Gimelstob	6	6^{3}	3
(Slovakia) K Kučera	3	7^{7}	6
(United States) C Mamiit	6	6
7	(Germany) L Burgsmüller	0	3
4	(Argentina) J I Chela	7^{7}	7
WC	(India) L Paes	6^{5}	5
WC	(India) R Bopanna	4	6^{3}
(Croatia) Ž Krajan	6	7^{7}
(France) J Golmard	1^{r}
(Spain) A Portas	1
Q	(Germany) T Behrend	6	6
5	(Romania) A Pavel	3	3

Second round
1	(Argentina) G Cañas	6	6
(Czech Republic) J Vaněk	4	2
(Slovakia) K Kučera	7^{8}	3	6
(United States) C Mamiit	6^{6}	6	3
4	(Argentina) J I Chela	3	6	2
(Croatia) Ž Krajan	6	3	0^{r}
(Spain) A Portas	6^{4}	1
Q	(Germany) T Behrend	7^{7}	6

Quarterfinals
1	(Argentina) G Cañas	1	5
(Slovakia) K Kučera	6	7
4	(Argentina) J I Chela	6	6
Q	(Germany) T Behrend	4	3

Semifinals
(Slovakia) K Kučera	6	7
4	(Argentina) J I Chela	3	5

=== Bottom half ===
First round
6	(Germany) R Schüttler	6	6
(Austria) J Knowle	4	1
Q	(Germany) M Kohlmann	6^{3}	3
(Australia) M Philippoussis	7^{7}	6
(Denmark) K Pless	2	5
(Monaco) J-R Lisnard	6	7
(Spain) J Balcells	5	4
LL	(Israel) N Okun	7	6
8	(Spain) A Montañés	7^{7}	1	6
(France) M Llodra	6^{5}	6	4
Q	(France) J Varlet	1	5
(Armenia) S Sargsian	6	7
(Netherlands) J van Lottum	6	7^{7}
Q	(France) O Patience	2	6^{4}
(Czech Republic) J Vacek	5	2
2	(Thailand) P Srichaphan	7	6

Second round
6	(Germany) R Schüttler	6	6
(Australia) M Philippoussis	2	1
(Monaco) J-R Lisnard	6	2	6
LL	(Israel) N Okun	0	6	2
8	(Spain) A Montañés	4	3
(Armenia) S Sargsian	6	6
(Netherlands) J van Lottum	2	4
2	(Thailand) P Srichaphan	6	6

Quarterfinals
6	(Germany) R Schüttler	2	5
(Monaco) J-R Lisnard	6	7
(Armenia) S Sargsian	4	4
2	(Thailand) P Srichaphan	6	6

Semifinals
(Monaco) J-R Lisnard	2	1
2	(Thailand) P Srichaphan	6	6
