= 2001 Hamlet Cup – Singles =

Singles
- 2001 Hamlet Cup
- 2000 Champion: (Sweden) Magnus Norman

Final
- Champion: (Germany) Tommy Haas
- Runner-up: (United States) Pete Sampras
- Score: 6–3, 3–6, 6–2

Events
Singles	Doubles
- Hamlet Cup

Magnus Norman was the defending champion but did not compete that year.

Tommy Haas won in the final 6–3, 3–6, 6–2 against Pete Sampras.

== Seeds ==
A champion seed is indicated in bold text while text in italics indicates the round in which that seed was eliminated.

1. n/a
2. (Spain) Àlex Corretja (first round)
3. (United States) Pete Sampras (final)
4. (France) Arnaud Clément (semifinals)
5. (Sweden) Thomas Johansson (semifinals)
6. (Germany) **Tommy Haas (champion)**
7. (Croatia) Goran Ivanišević (first round)
8. (United States) Jan-Michael Gambill (first round)
9. (Sweden) Thomas Enqvist (quarterfinals)

== Draw ==
Key

- Q = Qualifier
- WC = Wild card
- LL = Lucky loser
- Alt = Alternate
- ITF = ITF entry
- PR = Protected ranking
- SR = Special ranking
- SE = Special exempt
- JE = Junior exempt
- JR = Junior Accelerator Programme entrant
- CO = College Accelerator Programme entrant
- NG = Next Gen Accelerator Program entrant
- w/o = Walkover
- r = Retired
- d = Defaulted

First round
9	(Sweden) **T Enqvist**	**6**	**7**
(South Korea) H-T Lee	2	5
(France) **J Boutter**	6^{7}	**7^{9}**	**6**
Q	(Slovakia) D Hrbatý	**7^{9}**	6^{7}	3
(Germany) R Schüttler	6^{2}	6^{5}
(France) **A Dupuis**	**7^{7}**	**7^{7}**
(Czech Republic) M Tabara	1	4
5	(Sweden) **T Johansson**	**6**	**6**
WC/3	(United States) **P Sampras**	**6**	6^{3}	**7^{7}**
(Belgium) O Rochus	4	**7^{7}**	6^{4}
(Germany) L Burgsmüller	3	4
Q	(Austria) **A Peya**	**6**	**6**
WC	(United States) T Dent	**6**	1	3
(Argentina) **G Cañas**	1	**6**	**6**
Q	(Spain) **F Mantilla**	**6**	**7**
7	(Croatia) G Ivanišević	3	5
8	(United States) J-M Gambill	**6**	6^{3}	r
(Spain) **A Martín**	3	**7^{7}**
Q	(Brazil) **F Meligeni**	**6**	**7^{7}**
LL	(Austria) M Hipfl	2	6^{3}
(Italy) D Sanguinetti	6^{5}	3
(Germany) **D Prinosil**	**7^{7}**	**6**
(Australia) W Arthurs	**6**	3	6^{6}
4	(France) **A Clément**	4	**6**	**7^{8}**
6	(Germany) **T Haas**	**6**	6^{4}	**6**
(Switzerland) M Kratochvil	3	**7^{7}**	3
(Israel) H Levy	1	**7**	4
(Spain) **T Robredo**	**6**	5	**6**
(Sweden) **J Björkman**	**6**	**6**
(Spain) S Bruguera	1	1
(Spain) **G Blanco**	**7^{7}**	6^{4}	**6**
WC/2	(Spain) À Corretja	6^{4}	**7^{7}**	1

Second round
9	(Sweden) **T Enqvist**	**6**	**6**
(France) J Boutter	3	4
(France) A Dupuis	3	1
5	(Sweden) **T Johansson**	**6**	**6**
WC/3	(United States) **P Sampras**	**6**	**6**
Q	(Austria) A Peya	3	2
(Argentina) G Cañas	**7**	3	2
Q	(Spain) **F Mantilla**	5	**6**	**6**
(Spain) A Martín	**7^{7}**	4	2
Q	(Brazil) **F Meligeni**	6^{2}	**6**	**6**
(Germany) D Prinosil	4	6^{5}
4	(France) **A Clément**	**6**	**7^{7}**
6	(Germany) **T Haas**	**7^{7}**	3	**6**
(Spain) T Robredo	6^{3}	**6**	2
(Sweden) **J Björkman**	**7**
(Spain) G Blanco	5	r

Quarterfinals
9	(Sweden) T Enqvist	5	**6**	6^{7}
5	(Sweden) **T Johansson**	**7**	3	**7^{9}**
WC/3	(United States) **P Sampras**	**7**	**6**
Q	(Spain) F Mantilla	5	3
Q	(Brazil) F Meligeni	**6**	3	3
4	(France) **A Clément**	1	**6**	**6**
6	(Germany) **T Haas**	**6**	**6**
(Sweden) J Björkman	1	4

Semifinals
5	(Sweden) T Johansson	5	3
WC/3	(United States) **P Sampras**	**7**	**6**
4	(France) A Clément	3	6^{3}
6	(Germany) **T Haas**	**6**	**7^{7}**

Final
WC/3	(United States) Pete Sampras	3	**6**	2
6	(Germany) **Tommy Haas**	**6**	3	**6**
