= 2006 Chennai Open =

- Date: 2–9 January
- Edition: 11th
- Category: International Series
- Draw: 32S / 16D
- Prize money: $355,000
- Surface: Hard / outdoor
- Location: Chennai, India

Champions

Singles
- (Croatia) Ivan Ljubičić

Doubles
- (Slovakia) Michal Mertiňák / (Czech Republic) Petr Pála
| ← 2005 · | Chennai Open | · 2007 → |

The 2006 Chennai Open was an ATP men's tennis tournament held on outdoor hard courts in Chennai, India. It was the 11th edition of the tournament and was held from 2 January through 9 January 2006. First-seeded Ivan Ljubičić won the singles title.

== Finals ==
=== Singles ===
(Croatia) Ivan Ljubičić defeated (Spain) Carlos Moyà 7–6^{(8–6)}, 6–2

- It was Ljubičić's 1st title of the year and the 4th of his career.

=== Doubles ===
(Slovakia) Michal Mertiňák / (Czech Republic) Petr Pála defeated (India) Prakash Amritraj / (India) Rohan Bopanna 6–2, 7–5

- It was Mertiňák's 1st title of the year and the 1st of his career. It was Pála's 1st title of the year and the 5th of his career.
