= 2007 Chennai Open =

- Date: 1–8 January
- Edition: 12th
- Category: International Series
- Draw: 32S / 16D
- Prize money: $391,000
- Surface: Hard / outdoors
- Location: Chennai, India
- Venue: SDAT Tennis Stadium

Champions

Singles
- (Belgium) Xavier Malisse

Doubles
- (Belgium) Xavier Malisse / (Belgium) Dick Norman
← 2006 ·	Chennai Open	· 2008 →

The 2007 Chennai Open was a men's tennis tournament played on outdoor hard courts at the SDAT Tennis Stadium in Chennai in India and was part of the International Series of the 2007 ATP Tour. The tournament ran from 1 January through 8 January 2007. Third-seeded Xavier Malisse won the singles title.

== Finals ==
=== Singles ===
(Belgium) Xavier Malisse defeated (Austria) Stefan Koubek 6–1, 6–3

=== Doubles ===
(Belgium) Xavier Malisse / (Belgium) Dick Norman defeated (Spain) Rafael Nadal / (Spain) Bartolomé Salvá Vidal 7–6^{(7–4)}, 7–6^{(7–4)}
