= 2002 TD Waterhouse Cup – Doubles =

Doubles
- 2002 TD Waterhouse Cup
- 2001 Champions: (United States) Jonathan Stark (Zimbabwe) Kevin Ullyett

Final
- Champions: (India) Mahesh Bhupathi (United States) Mike Bryan
- Runners-up: (Czech Republic) Petr Pála (Czech Republic) Pavel Vízner
- Score: 6–3, 6–4

Events
Singles	Doubles
- TD Waterhouse Cup

At the 2002 TD Waterhouse Cup doubles, Jonathan Stark and Kevin Ullyett were the defending champions but only Ullyett competed that year with Robbie Koenig.

Koenig and Ullyett lost in the first round to Petr Pála and Pavel Vízner.

Mahesh Bhupathi and Mike Bryan won in the final 6–3, 6–4 against Pála and Vízner.

== Seeds ==
Champion seeds are indicated in bold text while text in italics indicates the round in which those seeds were eliminated.

1. (India) **Mahesh Bhupathi** / (United States) **Mike Bryan (champions)**
2. (South Africa) Robbie Koenig / (Zimbabwe) Kevin Ullyett (first round)
3. (Czech Republic) Tomáš Cibulec / (India) Leander Paes (first round)
4. (France) Julien Boutter / (France) Arnaud Clément (quarterfinals)

== Draw ==
Key

- Q = Qualifier
- WC = Wild card
- LL = Lucky loser
- Alt = Alternate
- ITF = ITF entry
- PR = Protected ranking
- SR = Special ranking
- SE = Special exempt
- JE = Junior exempt
- JR = Junior Accelerator Programme entrant
- CO = College Accelerator Programme entrant
- NG = Next Gen Accelerator Program entrant
- w/o = Walkover
- r = Retired
- d = Defaulted

First round
1	(India) **M Bhupathi** (United States) **M Bryan**	**6**	5	**6**
(Morocco) Y El Aynaoui (Romania) A Voinea	2	**7**	1
(Australia) P Hanley (Australia) N Healey	5	**6**	3
(Argentina) **M Rodríguez** (Brazil) **A Sá**	**7**	3	**6**
4	(France) **J Boutter** (France) **A Clément**	**6**	**7**
(Czech Republic) L Friedl (Belgium) T Vanhoudt	3	5
(South Africa) **M Barnard** (United States) **J Thomas**	**7^{7}**	2	**7^{9}**
(Sweden) S Aspelin (Japan) T Shimada	6^{4}	**6**	6^{7}
WC	(Uruguay) D Montes de Oca (Peru) J C Parker	4	0
(Czech Republic) **F Čermák** (Czech Republic) **P Luxa**	**6**	**6**
WC	(United States) **J-M Gambill** (United States) **G Oliver**	**6**	**7**
3	(Czech Republic) T Cibulec (India) L Paes	3	5
WC	(France) O Morel (United States) M Williams	6^{1}	5
(Austria) **S Koubek** (Finland) **J Nieminen**	**7^{7}**	**7**
(Czech Republic) **P Pála** (Czech Republic) **P Vízner**	**7**	6^{2}	**7**
2	(South Africa) R Koenig (Zimbabwe) K Ullyett	5	**7^{7}**	5

Quarterfinals
1	(India) **M Bhupathi** (United States) **M Bryan**	**6**	**6**
(Argentina) M Rodríguez (Brazil) A Sá	1	2
4	(France) J Boutter (France) A Clément	**7^{7}**	4	4
(South Africa) **M Barnard** (United States) **J Thomas**	6^{3}	**6**	**6**
(Czech Republic) F Čermák (Czech Republic) P Luxa	3	5
WC	(United States) **J-M Gambill** (United States) **G Oliver**	**6**	**7**
(Austria) S Koubek (Finland) J Nieminen	2	0
(Czech Republic) **P Pála** (Czech Republic) **P Vízner**	**6**	**6**

Semifinals
1	(India) **M Bhupathi** (United States) **M Bryan**	4	**6**	**6**
(South Africa) M Barnard (United States) J Thomas	**6**	4	4
WC	(United States) J-M Gambill (United States) G Oliver	**6**	4	6^{4}
(Czech Republic) **P Pála** (Czech Republic) **P Vízner**	2	**6**	**7^{7}**

Final
1	(India) **Mahesh Bhupathi** (United States) **Mike Bryan**	**6**	**6**
(Czech Republic) Petr Pála (Czech Republic) Pavel Vízner	3	4
