= 2004 Chennai Open – Singles =

Singles
- 2004 Chennai Open

Final
- Champion: (Spain) Carlos Moyá
- Runner-up: (Thailand) Paradorn Srichaphan
- Score: 6–4, 3–6, 7–6^{(7–5)}

Details
- Draw: 32
- Seeds: 8

Events
Singles	Doubles
← 2003 ·	Chennai Open	· 2005 →

Paradorn Srichaphan was the defending champion but lost in the final 6–4, 3–6, 7–6^{(7–5)} against Carlos Moyá.

== Seeds ==
1. (Spain) Carlos Moyá (champion)
2. (Thailand) Paradorn Srichaphan (final)
3. (Netherlands) Sjeng Schalken (semifinals)
4. (Spain) Tommy Robredo (semifinals)
5. (Spain) Félix Mantilla (quarterfinals)
6. (Spain) Rafael Nadal (first round)
7. (Spain) David Ferrer (second round)
8. (France) Antony Dupuis (second round)

== Draw ==
=== Key ===
- Q = Qualifier
- WC = Wild card
- LL = Lucky loser
- Alt = Alternate
- SE = Special exempt
- PR = Protected ranking
- ITF = ITF entry
- JE = Junior exempt
- w/o = Walkover
- r = Retired
- d = Defaulted
- SR = Special ranking

=== Finals ===
Semifinals
1	(Spain) Carlos Moyá	6	6
3	(Netherlands) Sjeng Schalken	3	4
4	(Spain) Tommy Robredo	6	6^{10}	5
2	(Thailand) Paradorn Srichaphan	1	7^{12}	7

Final
1	(Spain) Carlos Moyá	6	3	7^{7}
2	(Thailand) Paradorn Srichaphan	4	6	6^{5}

=== Top half ===
First round
1	(Spain) C Moyà	6	6
Q	(Israel) N Okun	3	4
(United States) P Goldstein	6	6
(France) O Mutis	3	3
WC	(India) H Mankad	3	4
WC	(India) P Amritraj	6	6
(France) T Ascione	7^{7}	6
6	(Spain) R Nadal	6^{5}	4
3	(Netherlands) S Schalken	6	7
Q	(Thailand) D Udomchoke	4	5
WC	(India) K Rastogi	4	1
Q	(Austria) J Knowle	6	6
(Netherlands) J van Lottum	7^{8}	6
(Spain) G Blanco	6^{6}	3
Q	(Czech Republic) J Vacek	3	6^{5}
5	(Spain) F Mantilla	6	7^{7}

Second round
1	(Spain) C Moyá	3	7^{9}	6
(United States) P Goldstein	6	6^{7}	4
WC	(India) P Amritraj	6	1	2
(France) T Ascione	3	6	6
3	(Netherlands) S Schalken	6	6
Q	(Austria) J Knowle	3	3
(Netherlands) J van Lottum	7^{7}	4	4
5	(Spain) F Mantilla	6^{3}	6	6

Quarterfinals
1	(Spain) C Moyá	6	6
(France) T Ascione	4	4
3	(Netherlands) S Schalken	6	5	7^{8}
5	(Spain) F Mantilla	2	7	6^{6}

Semifinals
1	(Spain) C Moyá	6	6
3	(Netherlands) S Schalken	3	4

=== Bottom half ===
First round
8	(France) A Dupuis	6	4	7^{8}
(Germany) A Popp	1	6	6^{6}
(Denmark) K Pless	6^{10}	3
(Monaco) J-R Lisnard	7^{12}	6
(France) P-H Mathieu	2	0^{r}
(Denmark) K Carlsen	6	1
(Russia) D Tursunov	5	7^{7}	4
4	(Spain) T Robredo	7	6^{2}	6
7	(Spain) D Ferrer	1	7	6
(Spain) F Verdasco	6	5	0
(Russia) I Andreev	7^{9}	6
(Spain) R Ramírez Hidalgo	6^{7}	2
(Israel) H Levy	6	6
(Spain) A Portas	4	2
(Spain) A Montañés	1	3
2	(Thailand) P Srichaphan	6	6

Second round
8	(France) A Dupuis	5	3
(Monaco) J-R Lisnard	7	6
(Denmark) K Carlsen	2	2
4	(Spain) T Robredo	6	6
7	(Spain) D Ferrer	2	3
(Russia) I Andreev	6	6
(Israel) H Levy	2	2
2	(Thailand) P Srichaphan	6	6

Quarterfinals
(Monaco) J-R Lisnard	4	6^{2}
4	(Spain) T Robredo	6	7^{7}
(Russia) I Andreev	3	6^{2}
2	(Thailand) P Srichaphan	6	7^{7}

Semifinals
4	(Spain) T Robredo	6	6^{10}	5
2	(Thailand) P Srichaphan	1	7^{12}	7
