= 2008 Chennai Open – Singles =

Tennis tournament

Singles
- 2008 Chennai Open

Final
- Champion: (Russia) Mikhail Youzhny
- Runner-up: (Spain) Rafael Nadal
- Score: 6–0, 6–1

Details
- Draw: 32 (4Q / 3WC)
- Seeds: 8

Events
Singles	Doubles
- Chennai Open

Xavier Malisse was the defending champion, but lost in the quarterfinals to Mikhail Youzhny.

Fourth-seeded Mikhail Youzhny won in the final 6–0, 6–1, against first-seeded Rafael Nadal.

== Seeds ==
1. (Spain) Rafael Nadal (final)
2. (Cyprus) Marcos Baghdatis (first round)
3. (Spain) Carlos Moyá (semifinals)
4. (Russia) Mikhail Youzhny (champion)
5. (France) Nicolas Mahut (second round)
6. (Austria) Jürgen Melzer (second round)
7. (Austria) Werner Eschauer (second round)
8. (France) Marc Gicquel (first round)

== Draw ==
Key

- Q = Qualifier
- WC = Wild card
- LL = Lucky loser
- Alt = Alternate
- ITF = ITF entry
- PR = Protected ranking
- SR = Special ranking
- SE = Special exempt
- JE = Junior exempt
- JR = Junior Accelerator Programme entrant
- CO = College Accelerator Programme entrant
- NG = Next Gen Accelerator Program entrant
- w/o = Walkover
- r = Retired
- d = Defaulted

=== Finals ===
Semifinals
1	(Spain) Rafael Nadal	6^{3}	7^{10}	7^{7}
3	(Spain) Carlos Moyá	7^{7}	6^{8}	6^{1}
4	(Russia) Mikhail Youzhny	6	6
(Croatia) Marin Čilić	2	3

Final
1	(Spain) Rafael Nadal	0	1
4	(Russia) Mikhail Youzhny	6	6

=== Top half ===
First round
1	(Spain) R Nadal	6	6
(France) M Montcourt	2	4
Q	(United States) R Ram	7^{8}	7^{7}
(Russia) Y Schukin	6^{6}	6^{2}
Q	(Austria) A Peya	4	4
(Spain) G García López	6	6
WC	(Spain) B Salva-Vidal	6^{3}	7	4
7	(Austria) W Eschauer	7^{7}	5	6
3	(Spain) C Moyá	6	6
(Russia) T Gabashvili	4	1
Q	(Russia) A Kudryavtsev	6	4	7^{10}
WC	(India) P Amritraj	3	6	6^{8}
(Spain) I Navarro	4	6^{6}
(France) F Serra	6	7^{8}
(Belgium) K Vliegen	7^{7}	6
8	(France) M Gicquel	6^{5}	4

Second round
1	(Spain) R Nadal	6	6
Q	(United States) R Ram	2	1
(Spain) G García López	4	7	7^{7}
7	(Austria) W Eschauer	6	5	6^{3}
3	(Spain) C Moyá	6	6^{4}	6
Q	(Russia) A Kudryavtsev	3	7^{7}	2
(France) F Serra	7	4	7^{7}
(Belgium) K Vliegen	5	6	6^{3}

Quarterfinals
1	(Spain) R Nadal	6	6
(Spain) G García López	3	2
3	(Spain) C Moyá	6	6
(France) F Serra	3	4

Semifinals
1	(Spain) R Nadal	6^{3}	7^{10}	7^{7}
3	(Spain) C Moyá	7^{7}	6^{8}	6^{1}

=== Bottom half ===
First round
6	(Austria) J Melzer	6	6
(Chile) P Capdeville	2	4
(Luxembourg) G Müller	4	3
(Belgium) X Malisse	6	6
(France) É Roger-Vasselin	6	6
WC	(India) V Vardhan	1	2
(Czech Republic) J Vaněk	3	2
4	(Russia) M Youzhny	6	6
5	(France) N Mahut	6	6
(Germany) D Gremelmayr	3	3
(Croatia) M Čilić	3	7^{8}	6
(Serbia) V Troicki	6	6^{6}	1
Q	(Croatia) L Zovko	6	6
(France) T Ascione	4	0
(Netherlands) R Haase	6	6
2	(Cyprus) M Baghdatis	3	4

Second round
6	(Austria) J Melzer	6^{3}	2
(Belgium) X Malisse	7^{7}	6
(France) É Roger-Vasselin	5	6	2
4	(Russia) M Youzhny	7	1	6
6	(France) N Mahut	2	4
(Croatia) M Čilić	6	6
Q	(Croatia) L Zovko	1	5
(Netherlands) R Haase	6	7

Quarterfinals
(Belgium) X Malisse	4	4
4	(Russia) M Youzhny	6	6
(Croatia) M Čilić	4	6	6
(Netherlands) R Haase	6	2	3

Semifinals
4	(Russia) M Youzhny	6	6
(Croatia) M Čilić	2	3
