= 2007 Chennai Open – Doubles =

Doubles
- 2007 Chennai Open

Final
- Champions: (Belgium) Xavier Malisse (Belgium) Dick Norman
- Runners-up: (Spain) Rafael Nadal (Spain) Bartolomé Salvá Vidal
- Score: 7–6^{(7–4)}, 7–6^{(7–4)}

Events
Singles	Doubles
- Chennai Open

Michal Mertiňák and Petr Pála were the defending champions, but lost in the first round this year.

Xavier Malisse and Dick Norman won in the final 7–6^{(7–4)}, 7–6^{(7–4)}, against Rafael Nadal and Bartolomé Salvá Vidal.

== Seeds ==
1. (Czech Republic) Leoš Friedl / (Germany) Michael Kohlmann (semifinals)
2. (Slovakia) Michal Mertiňák / (Czech Republic) Petr Pála (first round)
3. (South Africa) Jeff Coetzee / (Netherlands) Rogier Wassen (first round)
4. (Austria) Alexander Peya / (Germany) Björn Phau (semifinals)

== Draw ==
Key

- Q = Qualifier
- WC = Wild card
- LL = Lucky loser
- Alt = Alternate
- ITF = ITF entry
- PR = Protected ranking
- SR = Special ranking
- SE = Special exempt
- JE = Junior exempt
- JR = Junior Accelerator Programme entrant
- CO = College Accelerator Programme entrant
- NG = Next Gen Accelerator Program entrant
- w/o = Walkover
- r = Retired
- d = Defaulted

=== Draw ===
First round
1	(Czech Republic) L Friedl (Germany) M Kohlmann	6	4	[11]
(France) J Benneteau (France) N Mahut	3	6	[9]
WC	(India) A Singh (India) V Uppal	4	4
(Germany) T Behrend (Czech Republic) R Vik	6	6
3	(South Africa) J Coetzee (Netherlands) R Wassen	3	4
(Croatia) I Karlović (Croatia) L Zovko	6	6
(Belgium) X Malisse (Belgium) D Norman	4	6	[10]
(Italy) D Sanguinetti (Germany) A Waske	6	1	[7]
(Germany) C Kas (Germany) P Petzschner	6	3	[5]
(Czech Republic) T Cibulec (Germany) R Schüttler	2	6	[10]
(United Kingdom) J Auckland (Australia) S Huss	6	3	[8]
4	(Austria) A Peya (Germany) B Phau	3	6	[10]
(Czech Republic) D Škoch (Czech Republic) T Zíb	5	6	[8]
Alt	(Thailand) S Ratiwatana (Thailand) P Srichaphan	7	2	[10]
WC	(Spain) R Nadal (Spain) B Salvá Vidal	6	6
2	(Slovakia) M Mertiňák (Czech Republic) P Pála	1	3

Quarterfinals
1	(Czech Republic) L Friedl (Germany) M Kohlmann	6	6
(Germany) T Behrend (Czech Republic) R Vik	4	4
(Croatia) I Karlović (Croatia) L Zovko	2	7^{7}	[6]
(Belgium) X Malisse (Belgium) D Norman	6	6^{5}	[10]
(Czech Republic) T Cibulec (Germany) R Schüttler	1	2
4	(Austria) A Peya (Germany) B Phau	6	6
Alt	(Thailand) S Ratiwatana (Thailand) P Srichaphan	6	2	[7]
WC	(Spain) R Nadal (Spain) B Salvá Vidal	3	6	[10]

Semifinals
1	(Czech Republic) L Friedl (Germany) M Kohlmann	3	2
(Belgium) X Malisse (Belgium) D Norman	6	6
4	(Austria) A Peya (Germany) B Phau	5	1
WC	(Spain) R Nadal (Spain) B Salvá Vidal	7	6

Final
(Belgium) X Malisse (Belgium) D Norman	7^{7}	7^{7}
WC	(Spain) R Nadal (Spain) B Salvá Vidal	6^{4}	6^{4}
