= 2001 Hamlet Cup =

- Date: August 20–26
- Edition: 21st
- Category: International Series
- Surface: Hard / outdoor
- Location: Commack, New York, U.S.
- Venue: Hamlet Golf and Country Club

Champions

Singles
- (Germany) Tommy Haas

Doubles
- (United States) Jonathan Stark / (Zimbabwe) Kevin Ullyett
← 2000 ·	Hamlet Cup	· 2002 →

The 2001 Hamlet Cup was a men's tennis tournament played on outdoor hard courts at the Hamlet Golf and Country Club in Commack, New York in the United States and was part of the International Series of the 2001 ATP Tour. It was the 21st edition of the tournament and ran from August 20 through August 26, 2001. Sixth-seeded Tommy Haas won the singles title.

== Finals ==
=== Singles ===
(Germany) Tommy Haas defeated (United States) Pete Sampras 6–3, 3–6, 6–2

- It was Haas' 2nd title of the year and the 3rd of his career.

=== Doubles ===
(United States) Jonathan Stark / (Zimbabwe) Kevin Ullyett defeated (Czech Republic) Leoš Friedl / (Czech Republic) Radek Štěpánek 6–1, 6–4

- It was Stark's only title of the year and the 21st of his career. It was Ullyett's 2nd title of the year and the 12th of his career.
