= 2004 Chennai Open =

- Date: 5–11 January
- Edition: 9th
- Category: International Series
- Draw: 32S / 16D
- Prize money: $355,000
- Surface: Hard / outdoors
- Location: Chennai, India
- Venue: SDAT Tennis Stadium

Champions

Singles
- (Spain) Carlos Moyá

Doubles
- (Spain) Rafael Nadal / (Spain) Tommy Robredo
← 2003 ·	Chennai Open	· 2005 →

The 2004 Chennai Open was a men's tennis tournament played on outdoor hard courts at the SDAT Tennis Stadium in Chennai in India, part of the International Series of the 2004 ATP Tour. It ran from 5 January through 11 January 2004. First-seeded Carlos Moyá won the singles title while Rafael Nadal and Tommy Robredo took the doubles.

== Finals ==
=== Singles ===
(Spain) Carlos Moyá defeated (Thailand) Paradorn Srichaphan 6–4, 3–6, 7–6^{(7–5)}

- It was Moyá's 1st title of the year and the 14th of his career.

=== Doubles ===
(Spain) Rafael Nadal / (Spain) Tommy Robredo defeated (Israel) Jonathan Erlich / (Israel) Andy Ram 7–6^{(7–3)}, 4–6, 6–3

- It was Nadal's 1st title of the year and the 2nd of his career. It was Robredo's 1st title of the year and the 2nd of his career.
