= 2005 Chennai Open – Doubles =

Doubles
- 2005 Chennai Open

Final
- Champions: (Germany) Rainer Schüttler (Chinese Taipei) Yen-Hsun Lu
- Runners-up: (India) Mahesh Bhupathi (Sweden) Jonas Björkman
- Score: 7–5, 4–6, 7–6^{(7–4)}

Events
Singles	Doubles
- Chennai Open

Rafael Nadal and Tommy Robredo were the defending champions, but did not participate this year.

Rainer Schüttler and Yen-Hsun Lu won in the final 7–5, 4–6, 7–6^{(7–4)}, against Mahesh Bhupathi and Jonas Björkman.

== Seeds ==
1. (India) Mahesh Bhupathi / (Sweden) Jonas Björkman (final)
2. (India) Leander Paes / (Serbia and Montenegro) Nenad Zimonjić (semifinals)
3. (Israel) Jonathan Erlich / (Israel) Andy Ram (first round)
4. (United States) Justin Gimelstob / (Austria) Julian Knowle (first round)

== Draw ==
Key

- Q = Qualifier
- WC = Wild card
- LL = Lucky loser
- Alt = Alternate
- ITF = ITF entry
- PR = Protected ranking
- SR = Special ranking
- SE = Special exempt
- JE = Junior exempt
- JR = Junior Accelerator Programme entrant
- CO = College Accelerator Programme entrant
- NG = Next Gen Accelerator Program entrant
- w/o = Walkover
- r = Retired
- d = Defaulted

=== Draw ===
First round
1	(India) M Bhupathi (Sweden) J Björkman	7^{10}	6
(Belgium) C Rochus (Belgium) T Vanhoudt	6^{8}	3
(France) P-H Mathieu (France) O Patience	6^{4}	6	2
(Czech Republic) M Tabara (Spain) S Ventura	7^{7}	4	6
3	(Israel) J Erlich (Israel) A Ram	4	6^{2}
(Denmark) K Carlsen (United States) J-M Gambill	6	7^{7}
(Germany) L Burgsmüller (Switzerland) I Heuberger	2	6	1^{r}
(United States) K Kim (Czech Republic) J Vaněk	6	1	3
(Australia) A Fisher (United States) T Phillips	6	6
WC	(India) M Ghouse (India) V Uppal	1	2
(Chinese Taipei) Y-h Lu (Germany) J Schüttler	6	7
4	(United States) J Gimelstob (Austria) J Knowle	3	5
WC	(India) P Amritraj (India) S Amritraj	2	7	4
(Germany) K Braasch (Sweden) R Lindstedt	6	5	6
(France) J-F Bachelot (France) G Carraz	4	2
2	(India) L Paes (Serbia and Montenegro) N Zimonjić	6	6

Quarterfinals
1	(India) M Bhupathi (Sweden) J Björkman	3	6	6
(Czech Republic) M Tabara (Spain) S Ventura	6	4	4
(Denmark) K Carlsen (United States) J-M Gambill	3	7^{7}	4
(United States) K Kim (Czech Republic) J Vaněk	6	6^{4}	6
(Australia) A Fisher (United States) T Phillips	2	6	4
(Chinese Taipei) Y-h Lu (Germany) J Schüttler	6	1	6
(Germany) K Braasch (Sweden) R Lindstedt	2	6^{7}
2	(India) L Paes (Serbia and Montenegro) N Zimonjić	6	7^{9}

Semifinals
1	(India) M Bhupathi (Sweden) J Björkman	6	6
(United States) K Kim (Czech Republic) J Vaněk	2	3
(Chinese Taipei) Y-h Lu (Germany) J Schüttler	6	3	6
2	(India) L Paes (Serbia and Montenegro) N Zimonjić	3	6	4

Final
1	(India) M Bhupathi (Sweden) J Björkman	5	6	6^{4}
(Chinese Taipei) Y-h Lu (Germany) J Schüttler	7	4	7^{7}
