= Paradorn Srichaphan =

Thai tennis player (born 1979)

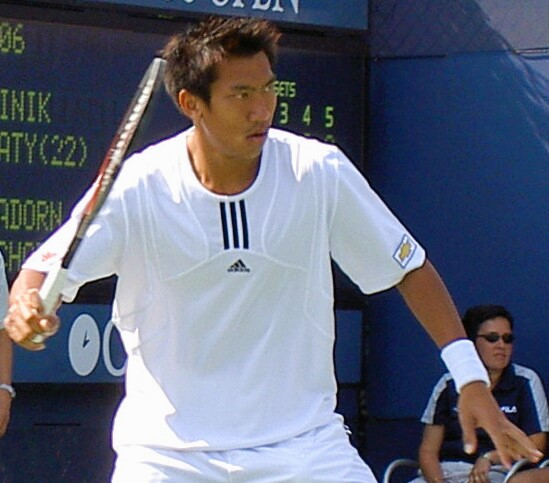
- Native name: ภราดร ศรีชาพันธุ์
- Country (sports): Thailand
- Residence: Bangkok, Thailand
- Born: 14 June 1979 (age 47) Khon Kaen, Thailand
- Height: 1.85 m (6 ft 1 in)
- Turned pro: 1997
- Retired: 2010
- Plays: Right-handed (one-handed backhand)
- Prize money: $3,459,655

Singles
- Career record: 239–193 (55.3%)
- Career titles: 5
- Highest ranking: No. 9 (12 May 2003)

Grand Slam singles results
- Australian Open: 4R (2004)
- French Open: 3R (2002)
- Wimbledon: 4R (2003)
- US Open: 4R (2003)

Other tournaments
- Olympic Games: 2R (2000)

Doubles
- Career record: 25–61
- Career titles: 0
- Highest ranking: No. 79 (8 September 2003)

Grand Slam doubles results
- French Open: 3R (2005)
- US Open: 1R (2005)
Medal record
Men's tennis
Representing Thailand
Asian Games
Gold medal – first place	1998 Bangkok	Men's doubles
Gold medal – first place	2002 Busan	Men's singles
Bronze medal – third place	2006 Doha	Team event
Southeast Asian Games
Gold medal – first place	1999 Bandar Seri Begawan	Men's singles
Gold medal – first place	1999 Bandar Seri Begawan	Men's doubles
Gold medal – first place	1999 Bandar Seri Begawan	Men's Team
- Last updated on: 19 January 2022.

Paradorn Srichaphan (Thai: ภราดร ศรีชาพันธุ์; RTGS: Pharadon Sichaphan; pronounced [pʰā.rāː.dɔ̄ːn sǐː.t͡ɕʰāː.pʰān]; born 14 June 1979) is a Thai former professional tennis player. Srichaphan was the first player from Asia to be ranked in the world's top 10 of men's singles by the Association of Tennis Professionals (ATP), reaching a career high ranking of world No. 9. His nickname is "Ball". He graduated as a Bachelor of Social Science from Ramkhamhaeng University.

== Junior career ==
Srichaphan played his first junior match in March 1993 at the age of 13 at a grade 2 tournament in Thailand. He won his first junior title in November 1993 and made his junior grand slam debut at the 1994 Wimbledon Championships where he lost in the first round to 2nd seed Ben Ellwood.

1996 would prove to be a breakout year for Srichaphan. Along with winning four titles within the year, he made the quarterfinals of the Australian Open, Wimbledon and the US Open. His ranking soared to a career-high of No. 10 in the world at the end of the year.

Srichaphan ended his junior career after a first round loss at the 1997 Wimbledon Championships. Throughout his junior career, he posted a win-loss record of 94–48.

Junior Grand Slam results – singles:

- Australian Open: QF (1996)
- French Open: 2R (1996)
- Wimbledon: QF (1996)
- US Open: QF (1996)

== Career ==
=== 1997–1998: Turning pro and ATP debut ===
Srichaphan turned pro in 1997 at the age of 18 after making his ATP debut at the 1997 Heineken Open in Singapore where he lost to former world No. 1 Jim Courier in three sets. Throughout 1997 and 1998, he mostly played ITF and ATP Challenger events winning one ITF event.

=== 1999: Success and breaking into the top 100 ===
Srichaphan began the year with an early loss in qualifying at the Australian Open and a second ITF title.

In April, Srichaphan recorded his first ATP win at the Salem Open defeating Petr Luxa in straight sets. He lost in the second round to 5th seed Nicolas Kiefer in straight sets. The next week at the Japan Open, he recorded another win against Vincenzo Santopadre in straight sets but once again lost in the second to 5th seed Nicolas Kiefer who would become the eventual champion.

After failing to qualify for the French Open, Srichaphan qualified for Wimbledon to make his grand slam debut. There, he defeated Guillaume Raoux in straight sets to record his first grand slam win. He lost in the second round to world No. 3 Yevgeny Kafelnikov.

September and October showed success for Srichaphan. In September, he made his first ATP quarterfinal at the President's Cup. In October, he made another quarterfinal at the Heineken Open Shanghai. The next week, he made his first semifinal at the Heineken Open Singapore defeating 3rd seed Magnus Norman en route.

Srichaphan broke into the top 100 in December and finished the year ranked No. 99. A remarkable jump from his ranking of 406 at the start of the year.

=== 2000–2001: Consistent appearances in ATP events ===
By mid-2000, Srichaphan had established himself as a figure on the ATP Tour who made consistent appearances in ATP events. He had played in every single grand slam in the year 2000 but was only able to win one match at the Australian Open against 14th seed and former semifinalist Karol Kučera in straight sets. He also dropped out of the top 100 in 2001.

=== 2002: Breakout year ===
Srichaphan began the year by making his first ATP final at the Chennai Open defeating 2nd seed Thomas Johansson and 4th seed Andrei Pavel en route. He lost to top seed Guillermo Cañas in straight sets. Because of his result, his ranking improved 36 spots from No. 120 to No. 86 putting him back into the top 100. One week later at the Adidas International he recorded his first win over a top 10 player, defeating top seed and world No. 6 Sébastien Grosjean in the first round in straight sets.

At the 2002 French Open, Srichaphan made the third round defeating 19th seed Thomas Enqvist along the way. He lost in the third round to wildcard and former Olympic bronze medalist Arnaud Di Pasquale in straight sets. One month later at Wimbledon, he upset 3rd seed, world No. 4, former world No. 1 and former champion Andre Agassi in the second round in straight sets to claim his second win over a top 10 player. He lost in the third round to former champion Richard Krajicek in straight sets.

August would bring much success for Srichaphan. At the Legg Mason Tennis Classic, he went into the tournament as the 14th seed and made the finals defeating 3rd seed Sjeng Schalken, 8th seed Jarkko Nieminen and 5th seed and former world No. 1 Marcelo Ríos en route. He lost in the final to 6th seed James Blake in three sets. One week later at the TD Waterhouse Cup, Srichaphan won his first career title defeating 7th seed Juan Ignacio Chela in the final in three sets.

In his final tournaments from September to November, Srichaphan saw very significant success. At the President's Cup, he upset top seed, world No. 4 and former world No. 1 Marat Safin in the quarterfinals in straight sets. Then, at the Japan Open, he upset world No. 1 Lleyton Hewitt in the quarterfinals in straight sets. At the Madrid Masters, he made his first Masters 1000 quarterfinal claiming another win over a top 10 player by defeating 4th seed and world No. 5 Tim Henman in the second round in straight sets. He lost in the quarterfinals to eventual finalist Jiří Novák in straight sets. He then won his second title one week later at the Stockholm Open defeating 6th seed Marcelo Ríos in the final in four sets. In his final tournament of the year at the Paris Masters, he made his first Masters 1000 semifinal defeating world No. 3 Juan Carlos Ferrero and world No. 12 Andy Roddick en route. He lost in the semifinals to world No. 1 Lleyton Hewitt in three sets.

Srichaphan finished the year with a win-loss record of 49–25 and a year-end ranking of No. 16. Another remarkable jump from his ranking of 120 at the start of the year. He also recorded six wins over top 10 players within the year and was awarded the most improved player of the year.

=== 2003: First Asian male into the top 10 ===
Srichaphan began the year by winning the Chennai Open without losing a set defeating Karol Kučera in the final.

At the Miami Masters, Srichaphan went into the tournament as the 13th seed and made his second Masters 1000 semifinal defeating former world No. 1 Yevgeny Kafelnikov along the way. He lost in the semifinals to world No. 5 and former world No. 1 Carlos Moyá in straight sets.

On 21 April, Srichaphan broke into the top 10 for the first time in his career. This made him the first Asian male in history to break into the top 10 in the singles rankings. He also reached his career-high ranking of No. 9 on 12 May and went into the French Open as the 10th seed which remains the highest he was seeded in a Grand Slam.

At Wimbledon, after a long streak of early exits, Srichaphan went into the tournament as the 12th seed and made the fourth round where he was beaten by Andy Roddick in four sets. En route to the fourth round, he defeated 17-year-old Rafael Nadal in Nadal's first Grand Slam. He became the first player to defeat Nadal at a Grand Slam. He also reached the fourth round in the US Open losing to Lleyton Hewitt. By the end of the year, he was ranked World No. 11 in the ATP rankings. He is however not in favor of playing doubles having won no title in this category on either Challenger or ATP level.

Srichaphan saw even more success during the US Open swing. He made the finals of the RCA Championships but lost to top seed Andy Roddick in straight sets. One month later, he defended his title at the TD Waterhouse Cup as the top seed without losing a set defeating James Blake in the final. He then made the fourth round of the US Open where he lost to world No. 6 Lleyton Hewitt in four sets.

Srichaphan finished the rest of the year with a quarterfinal in his home tournament of the Thailand Open, two semifinals in a row at the Japan Open and the Lyon Open and another Masters 1000 quarterfinal once again at the Madrid Masters where he lost to world No. 1 and eventual champion Juan Carlos Ferrero in straight sets. He finished the year with a win-loss record of 50–28 and a year-end ranking of No. 11, the highest year-end ranking of his career.

=== 2004: Last title of career ===
Srichaphan began the year with a third consecutive final appearance at the Chennai Open where he failed to defend his title against top seed and world No. 7 Carlos Moyá who won in three sets. Two weeks later at the Australian Open, he made the fourth round defeating 19th seed and former world No. 1 Gustavo Kuerten en route. He lost in the fourth round to world No. 4 Andre Agassi in straight sets.

Srichaphan won his fifth and last title at the Nottingham Open where he went into the tournament as the top seed defeating qualifier and former world No. 7 Thomas Johansson in the final in three sets. He failed to defend his title at the TD Waterhouse Cup after he lost to Luis Horna in the semifinals in three sets.

After his third round appearance at the US Open, Srichaphan made two more semifinals. The first one came at the China Open where he lost to Mikhail Youzhny in straight sets. The second one came at his home tournament of the Thailand Open where he lost to world No. 1 Roger Federer in three sets. He was the only player in the entire tournament to win a set from Federer.

Srichaphan ended the year with a win-loss record of 44–30 and a year-end ranking of 27.

=== 2005: Slow loss of form and rankings ===
Srichaphan began the year with a fourth consecutive final appearance at the Chennai Open where he once again lost to top seed Carlos Moyá in three sets.

2005 would prove to be a worse year for Srichaphan than his past years on the tour. Out of the seven Masters 1000 tournaments he played, he only recorded one win at the Miami Masters. His best Grand Slam result of the year was another third round appearance at the US Open where he defeated world No. 6 Nikolay Davydenko en route. Some other good results during the year included a quarterfinal at the 2005 Rotterdam Open where he defeated 2nd seed and world No. 5 Guillermo Coria en route, a semifinal at the Legg Mason Tennis Classic where he lost to top seed, world No. 5 and eventual champion Andy Roddick in straight sets and his last final at the Stockholm Open where he defeated top seed Thomas Johansson en route and lost to sixth seed James Blake in straight sets. He also failed to defend his title at the Nottingham Open after losing in the quarterfinals to 4th seed and eventual champion Richard Gasquet in three sets.

Srichaphan ended the year with a win-loss record of 34–31 and a year-end ranking of 42.

=== 2006: Indian Wells semifinal ===
Srichaphan began the year with his finals streak ending at the Chennai Open when he lost in the quarterfinals to Kristof Vliegen in straight sets.

At the Indian Wells Masters, Srichaphan reached the semifinals where he lost against world No. 1 Roger Federer in straight sets. En route to the semifinals, he beat world No. 20 Robby Ginepri in the second round, world No. 16 Juan Carlos Ferrero of Spain in the third round, world No. 4 David Nalbandian in the fourth round and world No. 25 Jarkko Nieminen of Finland in the quarterfinals. Because of his result, his ranking improved 23 spots from No. 61 to No. 38.

From late March to late August, Srichaphan endured a streak of early losses in tournaments which caused his ranking to fall. At the US Open, he defeated 24th seed José Acasuso in the first round which would become his last win in a Grand Slam.

After the US Open, Srichaphan made three more semifinals at the China Open where he defeated 2nd seed and world No. 5 Nikolay Davydenko en route and lost to 3rd seed, world No. 9 and eventual champion Marcos Baghdatis in three sets, the Thailand Open where he lost to top seed and world No. 3 Ivan Ljubičić in straight sets and the Swiss Indoors where he lost to world No. 1 Roger Federer in three sets and was once again the only player to win a set from Federer the entire tournament.

Srichaphan ended the year with a win-loss record of 30–32 and a year-end ranking of 53. It was the first time since 2001 that he had more losses than wins on his yearly record.

=== 2007–2010: Injuries and retirement ===
Srichaphan once again began the year at the Chennai Open where he defeated qualifier Simone Bolelli in the first round in straight sets for the last match win of his career. He lost in the second round to eventual finalist Stefan Koubek in straight sets.

Srichaphan would go on to lose five matches in a row between January and March to have a win-loss record of 1–5 in 2007. These losses included a straight sets loss to qualifier Dudi Sela at the 2007 Australian Open which would be the last Grand Slam of his career and a straight sets loss to Janko Tipsarević at the Indian Wells Masters which dropped his ranking down 31 spots from No. 52 to No. 83 due to his inability to match his semifinal result of the previous year.

At the Miami Masters, Srichaphan sustained a wrist injury in his first round match against Luis Horna and was forced to retire late in the first set. The injury caused him to miss the rest of 2007 and to fall out of the ATP rankings in March 2008 due to his inactivity. He began practicing to return to the tour and returned at the 2009 Thailand Open in doubles partnering fellow Thai Danai Udomchoke but lost in the first round to Michael Kohlmann and Alexander Peya in three sets. It would be the last tournament of his career.

Srichaphan once again began practicing to make a strong return to the tour, but in June 2010, he was involved in a motorcycle accident that broke both his hands and severely injured his knee. Because of the injuries sustained in the accident, he officially retired on 4 June.

== National representation ==
=== Olympics ===
Srichaphan made his Olympics debut at the 2000 Summer Olympics in Sydney, Australia in the singles draw. There, he defeated Attila Sávolt in the first round but lost in the second round to 3rd seed Magnus Norman in straight sets. At the 2004 Summer Olympics in Athens, Greece, he was Thailand's flag bearer at the opening ceremony. He went into the tournament as the 12th seed but lost in the first round of singles to Joachim Johansson in straight sets.

=== Davis Cup ===
Srichaphan made his Davis Cup debut for Thailand in April 1998 at the age of 18. During his time with the team from 1998 to 2006, he posted a win-loss record of 33–13 (31–10 in singles).

=== Asian Games ===
At the 1998 Asian Games Srichaphan won a gold medal in the doubles partnering his older brother, Narathorn Srichaphan. He then won a gold medal in singles at the next edition in 2002 which he won without losing a set. In addition, he was a triple gold medalist at the 1999 Southeast Asian Games winning in singles, doubles (once again partnering his brother, Narathorn) and the team event.

=== Hopman Cup ===
Srichaphan partnered Tamarine Tanasugarn after qualifying for the 2000 Hopman Cup. There, they surprisingly won the group stage to qualify for the finals where they lost to South Africa's team of Amanda Coetzer and Wayne Ferreira. They returned at the next edition in 2001 but lost in the group stage.

== Playing style ==
Srichaphan was known for his athleticism on court. He was known for being quick and flexible allowing him to return balls from unlikely and uncomfortable positions. Because of this, he was regarded as one of the most entertaining players on tour. He was also known for playing a flat and powerful playing style. His forehand is regarded as having been his best and most powerful weapon.

== Personal life ==
Srichaphan was born on 14 June 1979, in Bangkok, the capital of Thailand. He started playing tennis at the age of 6 with his dad who quit his bank job to coach his son.

Srichaphan is noted for his politeness on the court. At each match, he performs the wai, the traditional Thai greeting, clasping his hands together and bowing to the four corners of the stadium. The gesture is seen as thanking the fans and it has become his trademark. His success in tennis led to a spike in popularity of the game in Thailand.

Srichaphan is extremely popular in Asia, especially in Thailand. The Nation newspaper named him "Thai of the Year" in 2002; in 2003, Srichaphan was featured on the cover of Time and featured as one of the year's "Asian heroes".

In November 2005, Srichaphan spent a week as a Buddhist monk in a temple outside Bangkok. He adopted the Buddhist name Mahaviro, meaning "great and brave", wore saffron robes and shaved his head. His then girlfriend, Odette Henriette Jacqmin was present for the ceremony.

Srichaphan married Miss Universe 2005, Natalie Glebova of Canada in his home of Bangkok, Thailand, on 29 November 2007.

In June 2010, Srichaphan officially announced his retirement from the ATP tour but will coach Thailand's Davis Cup team.

In February 2011, Srichaphan and his wife, Natalie, announced their separation after three years of marriage stating the reason to be "work commitments had kept them apart."

Srichaphan still follows Everton, a football club supported since Li Tie and Li Weifeng arrived from East Asia.

Srichaphan currently resides in Thailand where he got married once again and had a child. He also coaches young children in tennis.

== Awards ==
Srichaphan has twice been awarded the ATP Stefan Edberg Sportsmanship Award, in 2002 and 2003. He was also awarded the ATP Most improved player of the year in 2002 due to his rapid success within the year.

== ATP career finals ==
=== Singles: 11 (5 titles, 6 runner-ups) ===
Legend Grand Slam Tournaments (0–0) ATP World Tour Finals (0–0) ATP Masters Series (0–0) ATP International Series Gold (0–2) ATP International Series (5–4)	Finals by surface Hard (4–6) Clay (0–0) Grass (1–0) Carpet (0–0)	Finals by setting Outdoors (4–5) Indoors (1–1)

Result	W–L	Date	Tournament	Tier	Surface	Opponent	Score
Loss	0–1	Jan 2002	Chennai, India	International Series	Hard	(Argentina) Guillermo Cañas	4–6, 6–7^{(2–7)}
Loss	0–2	Aug 2002	Washington, United States	International Series Gold	Hard	(United States) James Blake	6–1, 6–7^{(5–7)}, 4–6
Win	1–2	Aug 2002	Long Island, United States	International Series	Hard	(Argentina) Juan Ignacio Chela	5–7, 6–2, 6–2
Win	2–2	Oct 2002	Stockholm, Sweden	International Series	Hard (i)	(Chile) Marcelo Ríos	6–7^{(2–7)}, 6–0, 6–3, 6–2
Win	3–2	Jan 2003	Chennai, India	International Series	Hard	(Slovakia) Karol Kučera	6–3, 6–1
Loss	3–3	Jul 2003	Indianapolis, United States	International Series Gold	Hard	(United States) Andy Roddick	6–7^{(2–7)}, 4–6
Win	4–3	Aug 2003	Long Island, United States	International Series	Hard	(United States) James Blake	6–2, 6–4
Loss	4–4	Jan 2004	Chennai, India	International Series	Hard	(Spain) Carlos Moyá	4–6, 6–3, 6–7^{(5–7)}
Win	5–4	Jun 2004	Nottingham, United Kingdom	International Series	Grass	(Sweden) Thomas Johansson	1–6, 7–6^{(7–4)}, 6–3
Loss	5–5	Jan 2005	Chennai, India	International Series	Hard	(Spain) Carlos Moyá	6–3, 4–6, 6–7^{(5–7)}
Loss	5–6	Oct 2005	Stockholm, Sweden	International Series	Hard (i)	(United States) James Blake	1–6, 6–7^{(6–8)}

== ATP Challenger and ITF Futures Finals ==
=== Singles: 8 (3–5) ===
Legend ATP Challenger (1–4) ITF Futures (2–1)	Finals by surface Hard (3–3) Clay (0–1) Grass (0–0) Carpet (0–1)

Result	W–L	Date	Tournament	Tier	Surface	Opponent	Score
Loss	0–1	May 1998	Korea F1, Sogwipo	Futures	Hard	(South Korea) Lee Hyung-taik	3–6, 3–6
Win	1–1	Nov 1998	Thailand F1, Bangkok	Futures	Hard	(Slovenia) Miha Gregorc	6–7, 6–1, 6–3
Win	2–1	Jan 1999	India F3, Bombay	Futures	Hard	(Switzerland) Michel Kratochvil	7–6, 6–2
Loss	2–2	Nov 1999	Yokohama, Japan	Challenger	Hard (i)	(South Korea) Lee Hyung-taik	3–6, 0–6
Loss	2–3	May 2000	Birmingham, United States	Challenger	Clay	(Haiti) Ronald Agenor	5–7, 3–6
Loss	2–4	Nov 2000	Charleroi, Belgium	Challenger	Carpet (i)	(Netherlands) Jan Siemerink	6–7^{(2–7)}, 6–7^{(8–10)}
Win	3–4	Dec 2001	Bangkok, Thailand	Challenger	Hard	(Netherlands) John Van Lottum	6–2, 6–3
Loss	3–5	Feb 2002	Brest, France	Challenger	Hard (i)	(Georgia (country)) Irakli Labadze	4–6, 5–7

=== Doubles: 4 (1–3) ===
Legend ATP Challenger (1–1) ITF Futures (0–2)	Finals by surface Hard (0–3) Clay (0–0) Grass (1–0) Carpet (0–0)

Result	W–L	Date	Tournament	Tier	Surface	Partner	Opponents	Score
Loss	0–1	Nov 1998	Thailand F1, Bangkok	Futures	Hard	(Thailand) Narathorn Srichaphan	(Chinese Taipei) Chen Chih-Jung (Chinese Taipei) Lin Bing-Chao	3–6, 6–3, 3–6
Loss	0–2	Jul 1999	Indonesia F4, Jakarta	Futures	Hard	(Thailand) Narathorn Srichaphan	(Indonesia) Andrian Raturandang (South Korea) Yong-Il Yoon	2–6, 6–2, 4–6
Win	1–2	Dec 1999	Lucknow, India	Challenger	Grass	(Denmark) Kristian Pless	(United Kingdom) Jamie Delgado (United Kingdom) Martin Lee	5–7, 6–3, 7–5
Loss	1–3	Jan 2001	Waikoloa, United States	Challenger	Hard	(United States) Mike Bryan	(United States) Paul Goldstein (United States) Jim Thomas	6–3, 4–6, 3–6

== Performance timelines ==
Key
W	F	SF	QF	#R	RR	Q#	DNQ	A	NH

(W) winner; (F) finalist; (SF) semifinalist; (QF) quarterfinalist; (#R) rounds 4, 3, 2, 1; (RR) round-robin stage; (Q#) qualification round; (DNQ) did not qualify; (A) absent; (NH) not held; (SR) strike rate (events won / competed); (W–L) win–loss record.

=== Singles ===
Tournament	1998	1999	2000	2001	2002	2003	2004	2005	2006	2007	SR	W–L	Win%
Grand Slam tournaments
Australian Open	Q1	Q2	2R	1R	1R	2R	4R	2R	1R	1R	0 / 8	6–8	43%
French Open	A	Q1	1R	Q2	3R	1R	2R	1R	1R	A	0 / 6	3–6	33%
Wimbledon	A	2R	1R	1R	3R	4R	1R	1R	1R	A	0 / 8	6–8	43%
US Open	A	Q3	1R	1R	2R	4R	3R	3R	2R	A	0 / 7	9–7	56%
Win–Loss	0–0	1–1	1–4	0–3	5–4	7–4	6–4	3–4	1–4	0–1	0 / 29	24–29	45%
Olympic Games
Summer Olympics	NH		2R	Not Held			1R	Not Held			0 / 2	1–2	33%
ATP World Tour Masters 1000
Indian Wells	A	A	Q1	2R	2R	1R	2R	3R	SF	1R	0 / 7	8–7	53%
Miami	A	A	A	Q2	2R	SF	4R	2R	1R	1R	0 / 6	7–6	54%
Monte Carlo	A	A	A	A	Q1	2R	1R	1R	1R	A	0 / 4	1–4	20%
Rome	A	A	A	A	Q2	1R	2R	1R	1R	A	0 / 4	1–4	20%
Hamburg	A	A	A	Q1	Q1	1R	1R	1R	1R	A	0 / 4	0–4	0%
Canada	A	A	2R	1R	2R	3R	2R	1R	2R	A	0 / 7	6–7	46%
Cincinnati	A	A	A	Q1	Q2	1R	3R	1R	1R	A	0 / 4	2–4	33%
Madrid	Not Held				QF	QF	3R	A	2R	A	0 / 4	7–4	64%
Paris	A	A	A	A	SF	3R	2R	Q1	1R	A	0 / 4	6–4	60%
Win–Loss	0–0	0–0	1–1	1–2	10–5	10–9	8–9	1–7	7–9	0–2	0 / 44	38–44	46%
Career statistics
Titles	0	0	0	0	2	2	1	0	0	0	5		
Finals	0	0	0	0	4	3	2	2	0	0	11		
Overall win–loss	0–0	10–7	11–18	10–16	49–25	50–28	44–30	34–31	30–32	1–5	239–193		
Year-end ranking	404	99	109	120	16	11	27	42	53	628	55.32%		

=== Doubles ===
Tournament	2001	2002	2003	2004	2005	2006	SR	W–L	Win %
Grand Slam tournaments
Australian Open	A	A	A	A	A	A	0 / 0	0–0	–
French Open	A	A	A	1R	3R	1R	0 / 3	2–3	40%
Wimbledon	A	A	A	A	A	A	0 / 0	0–0	–
US Open	A	A	A	A	1R	A	0 / 1	0–1	0%
Win–Loss	0–0	0–0	0–0	0–1	2–2	0–1	0 / 4	2–4	33%
ATP Tour Masters 1000
Indian Wells	A	A	1R	1R	A	A	0 / 2	0–2	0%
Monte Carlo	A	A	A	1R	A	A	0 / 1	0–1	0%
Hamburg	Q1	A	2R	1R	A	A	0 / 2	1–2	33%
Rome	A	A	QF	1R	A	2R	0 / 3	3–3	50%
Canada	A	A	2R	A	A	A	0 / 1	1–1	50%
Cincinnati	A	A	2R	A	A	A	0 / 1	1–1	50%
Win–Loss	0–0	0–0	5–5	0–4	0–0	1–1	0 / 10	6–10	38%

== Record against top 10 players ==
Srichaphan's match record against players who have been ranked No. 10 or higher, with those who have been ranked No. 1 in boldface.

- (Sweden) Thomas Johansson 3–0
- (South Africa) Wayne Ferreira 3–1
- (United States) Michael Chang 3–2
- (Russia) Nikolay Davydenko 3–2
- (Spain) Albert Costa 2–0
- (Slovakia) Karol Kučera 2–0
- (Brazil) **Gustavo Kuerten** 2–0
- (Chile) **Marcelo Ríos** 2–0
- (Sweden) Robin Söderling 2–0
- (Spain) Fernando Verdasco 2–0
- (Spain) Tommy Robredo 2–1
- (Spain) **Juan Carlos Ferrero** 2–3
- (Croatia) Ivan Ljubičić 2–5
- (United Kingdom) Tim Henman 2–6
- (Sweden) Jonas Björkman 1–0
- (Sweden) Thomas Enqvist 1–0
- (Ecuador) Nicolás Lapentti 1–0
- (Chile) Nicolás Massú 1–0
- (Austria) Jürgen Melzer 1–0
- (Spain) **Rafael Nadal** 1–0
- (France) Gilles Simon 1–0
- (Croatia) Mario Ančić 1–1
- (Spain) David Ferrer 1–1
- (Sweden) Joachim Johansson 1–1
- (Germany) Rainer Schüttler 1–1
- (Russia) Mikhail Youzhny 1–1
- (Switzerland) Stan Wawrinka 1–1
- (United States) **Andre Agassi** 1–2
- (Czech Republic) Tomáš Berdych 1–2
- (France) Sébastien Grosjean 1–2
- (Russia) **Yevgeny Kafelnikov** 1–2
- (United States) Todd Martin 1–2
- (Argentina) Juan Mónaco 1–2
- (Argentina) David Nalbandian 1–2
- (Sweden) Magnus Norman 1–2
- (Czech Republic) Radek Štěpánek 1–2
- (Argentina) Guillermo Cañas 1–3
- (Spain) Àlex Corretja 1–3
- (United States) Mardy Fish 1–3
- (Russia) **Marat Safin** 1–3
- (Germany) Nicolas Kiefer 1–4
- (Australia) **Lleyton Hewitt** 1–5
- (Czech Republic) Jiří Novák 1–5
- (United States) James Blake 1–7
- (United States) **Andy Roddick** 1–7
- (Cyprus) Marcos Baghdatis 0–1
- (France) Arnaud Clément 0–1
- (United States) **Jim Courier** 0–1
- (Germany) Tommy Haas 0–1
- (Netherlands) Richard Krajicek 0–1
- (Sweden) Magnus Larsson 0–1
- (United Kingdom) **Andy Murray** 0–1
- (Australia) Mark Philippoussis 0–1
- (Switzerland) Marc Rosset 0–1
- (France) Richard Gasquet 0–2
- (Chile) Fernando González 0–2
- (United Kingdom) Greg Rusedski 0–2
- (Serbia) Janko Tipsarević 0–2
- (Switzerland) **Roger Federer** 0–4
- (Spain) **Carlos Moyá** 0–4

== Top 10 Wins ==
Season	1997	1998	1999	2000	2001	2002	2003	2004	2005	2006	2007	Total
Wins	0	0	0	0	0	6	0	0	2	2	0	10

#	Player	Rank	Event	Surface	Rd	Score	SR
2002
1.	(France) Sébastien Grosjean	6	Sydney, Australia	Hard	1R	6–3, 6–4	86
2.	(United States) Andre Agassi	4	Wimbledon, London, United Kingdom	Grass	2R	6–4, 7–6^{(7–5)}, 6–2	67
3.	(Russia) Marat Safin	4	Tashkent, Uzbekistan	Hard	QF	6–3, 7–6^{(7–5)}	31
4.	(Australia) Lleyton Hewitt	1	Tokyo, Japan	Hard	QF	6–4, 6–3	31
5.	(United Kingdom) Tim Henman	5	Madrid, Spain	Hard (i)	2R	3–6, 6–3, 6–3	28
6.	(Spain) Juan Carlos Ferrero	3	Paris, France	Carpet (i)	2R	6–2, 6–3	21
2005
7.	(Argentina) Guillermo Coria	5	Rotterdam, Netherlands	Hard (i)	2R	2–6, 7–6^{(7–2)}, 6–3	33
8.	(Russia) Nikolay Davydenko	6	US Open, New York, United States	Hard	2R	6–4, 7–5, 6–3	51
2006
9.	(Argentina) David Nalbandian	4	Indian Wells, United States	Hard	4R	6–7^{(5–7)}, 6–3, 6–2	61
10.	(Russia) Nikolay Davydenko	5	Beijing, China	Hard	QF	6–2, 1–0, ret.	47

== Business career ==
In August 2009, Paradorn opened an Italian cuisine restaurant in Bangkok named So–Le Cafe. At the same time, Paradorn also launched an herbal-product company named Magic Thaiherbs. He also tried his hand at acting in Bang Rajan 2, the sequel of Bang Rajan.

Awards and achievements
Preceded by Goran Ivanišević	ATP Most Improved Player; 2002	Succeeded by Rainer Schüttler
Preceded by Patrick Rafter	Stefan Edberg Sportsmanship Award; 2002 and 2003	Succeeded by Roger Federer
Olympic Games
Preceded by Somluck Kamsing	Flagbearer for Thailand; Athens 2004	Succeeded by Worapoj Petchkoom
