= 2026 Laver Cup =

- Date: 25–27 September 2026
- Edition: 9th
- Surface: Hard (indoor)
- Location: London, United Kingdom
- Venue: The O2 Arena

Champions
- Team Europe; 13 – 5
- Laver Cup

The 2026 Laver Cup was the ninth edition of the Laver Cup, a men's tennis tournament between teams from Europe and the rest of the world. Held at The O2 Arena in London, the tournament was played on indoor hard courts. Yannick Noah and Andre Agassi served as team captains, returning from the previous year. Team Europe defeated Team World 13–5.

== Player selection ==
On 18 November 2025, Carlos Alcaraz and Taylor Fritz were the first players to confirm their participation for Team Europe and Team World respectively. On 19 February 2026, Alexander Zverev and Alex de Minaur were the next players to join the roster for the event. On 7 May 2026, Ben Shelton was confirmed for the event. On 15 June 2026, Jakub Menšík and Flavio Cobolli were confirmed for Team Europe, and Alexander Bublik was confirmed for Team World.

On 25 June 2026, Learner Tien and Tommy Paul were confirmed as the final picks for Team World. Team Europe announced Rafael Jódar on 15 July 2026, making his Laver Cup debut and Casper Ruud was announced as the final pick on 28 July 2026. On 12 September 2026, Paul withdrew due to injury and was replaced by Francisco Cerúndolo. On 17 September 2026, Shelton withdrew and was replaced by Brandon Nakashima.

== Participants ==
Team Europe
Captain: (France) Yannick Noah
Vice-captain: (United Kingdom) Tim Henman
Player	Rank
(Germany) Alexander Zverev	2
(Spain) Carlos Alcaraz	3
(Italy) Flavio Cobolli	7
(Spain) Rafael Jódar	14
(Czech Republic) Jakub Menšík	15
(Norway) Casper Ruud	17
(United Kingdom) Arthur Fery	36

Team World
Captain: (United States) Andre Agassi
Vice-captain: (Australia) Pat Rafter
Player	Rank
(United States) ~~Ben Shelton~~	4
(Australia) Alex de Minaur	9
(United States) Taylor Fritz	10
(United States) Learner Tien	13
(United States) Brandon Nakashima	16
(United States) ~~Tommy Paul~~	18
(Kazakhstan) Alexander Bublik	21
(Argentina) Francisco Cerúndolo	22
(Peru) Ignacio Buse	35

- Singles rankings as of 21 September 2026

Withdrew
Alternate

Team Europe

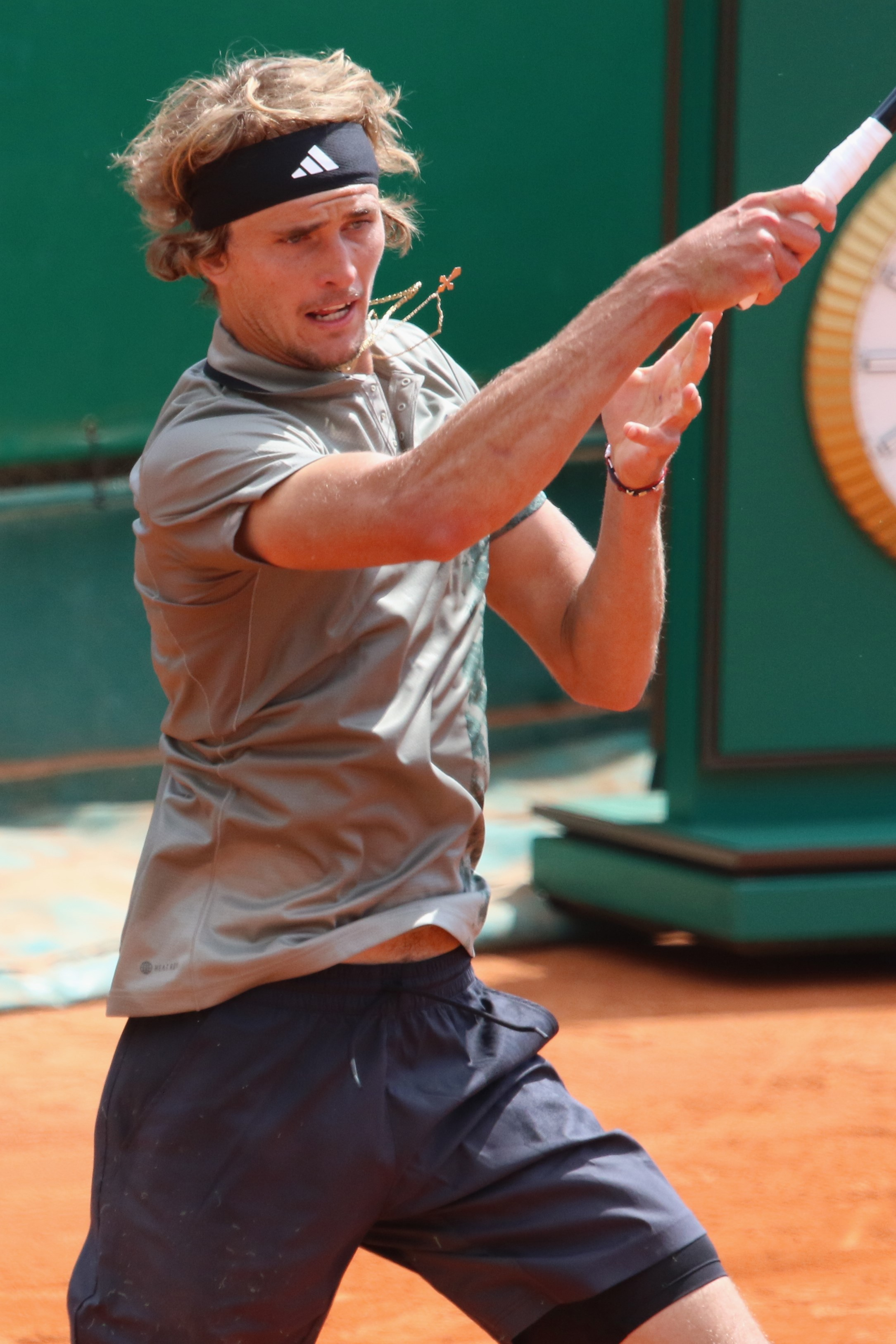
Zverev

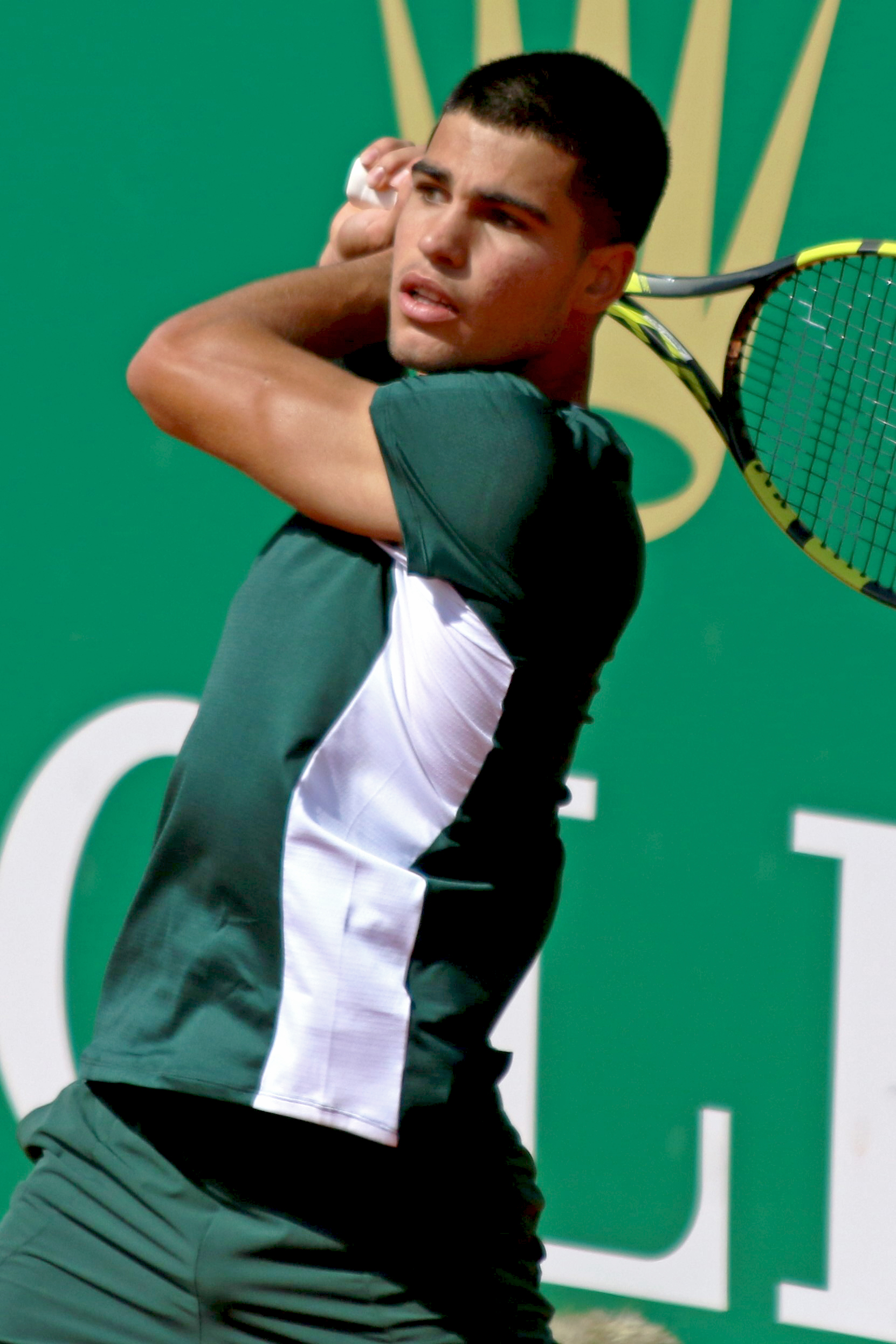
Alcaraz

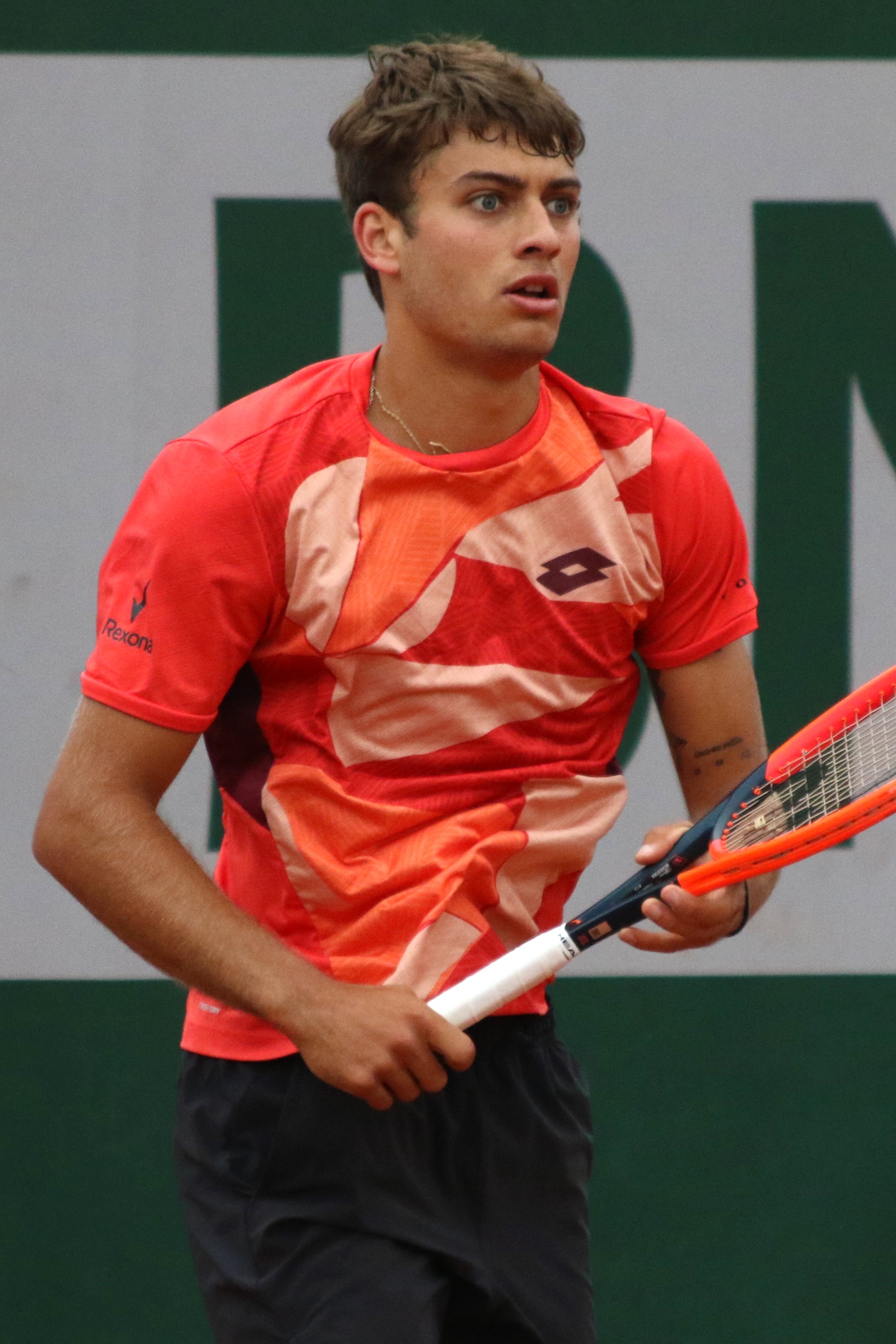
Cobolli

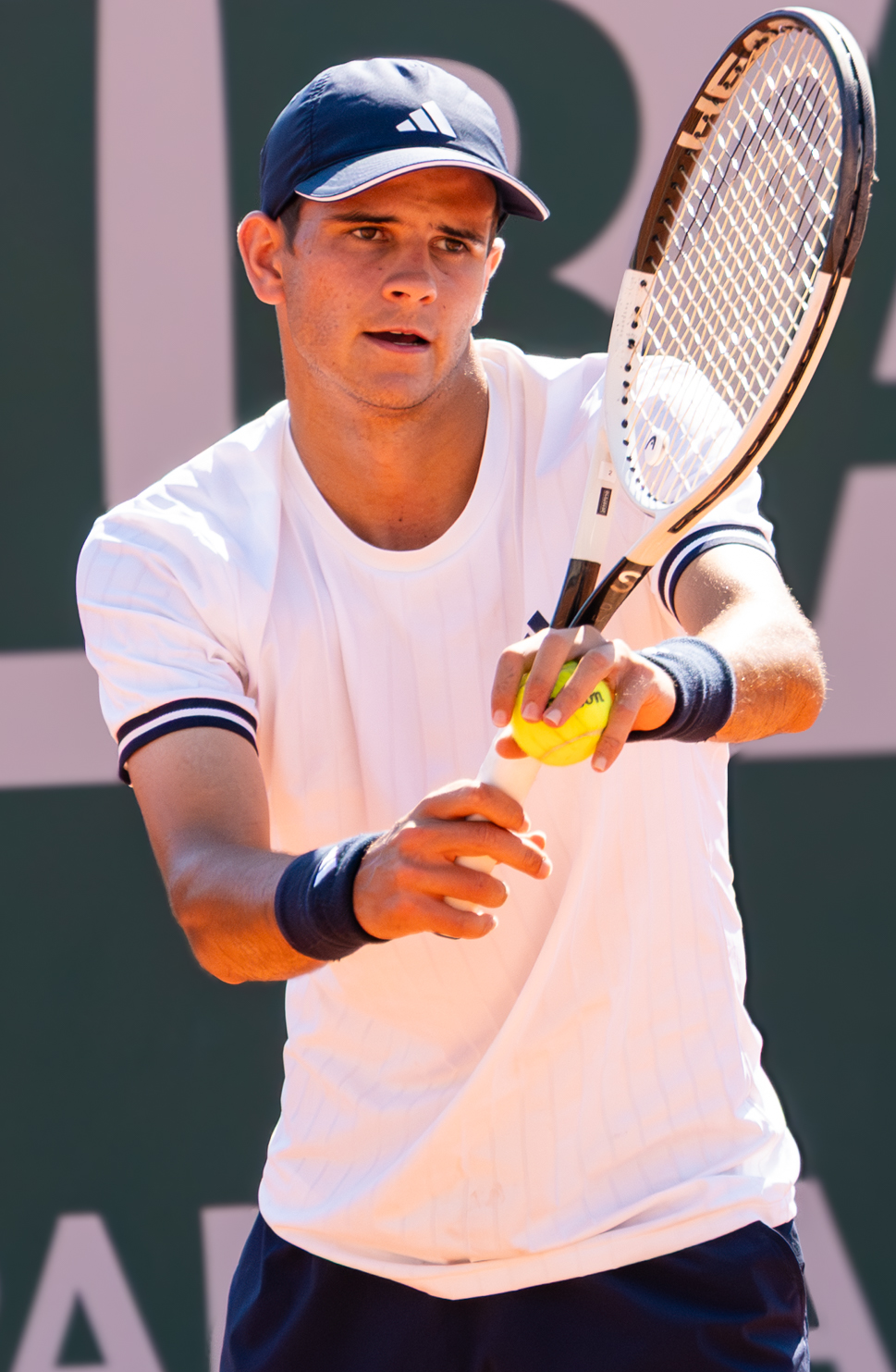
Jódar

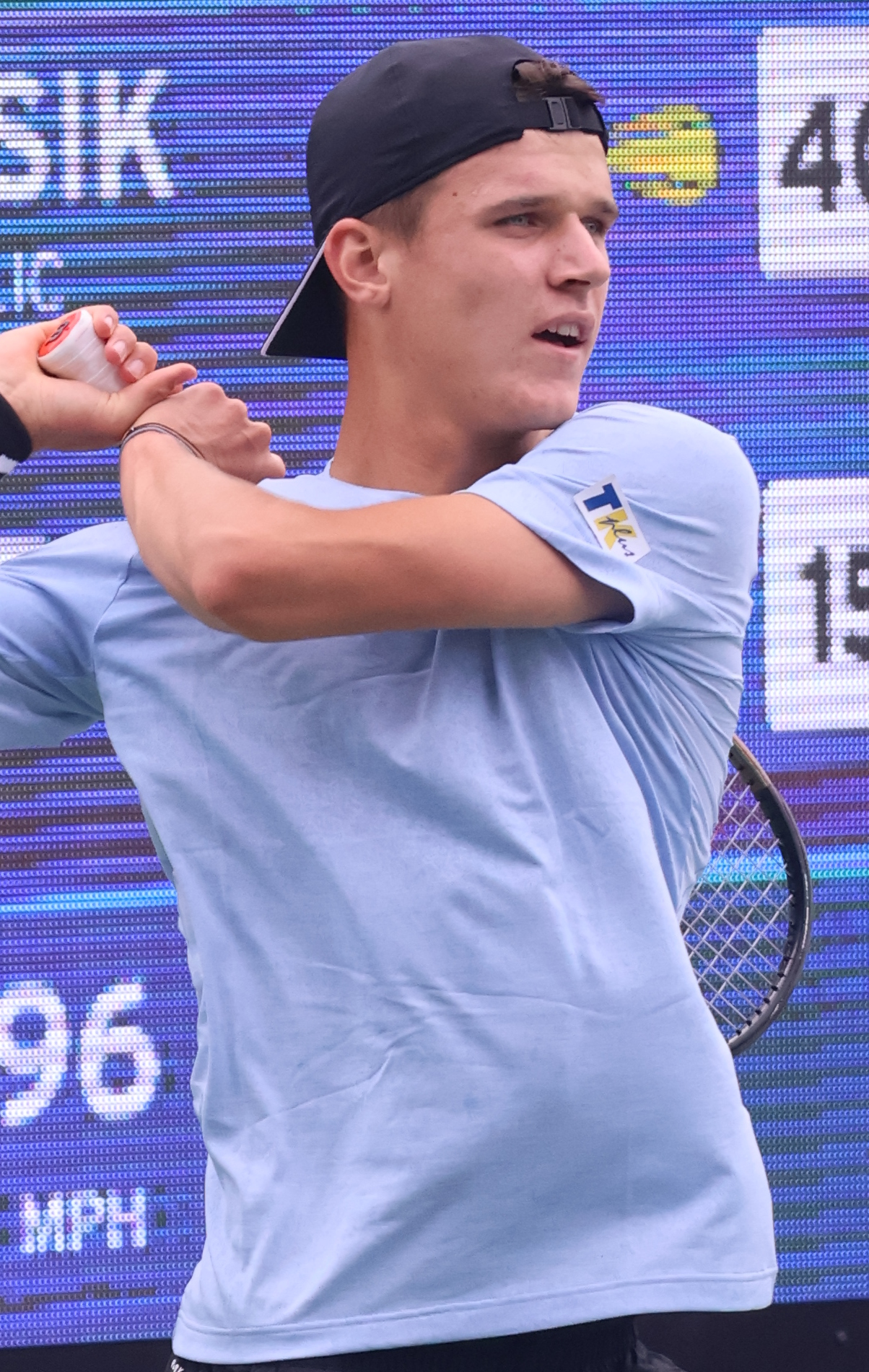
Menšík

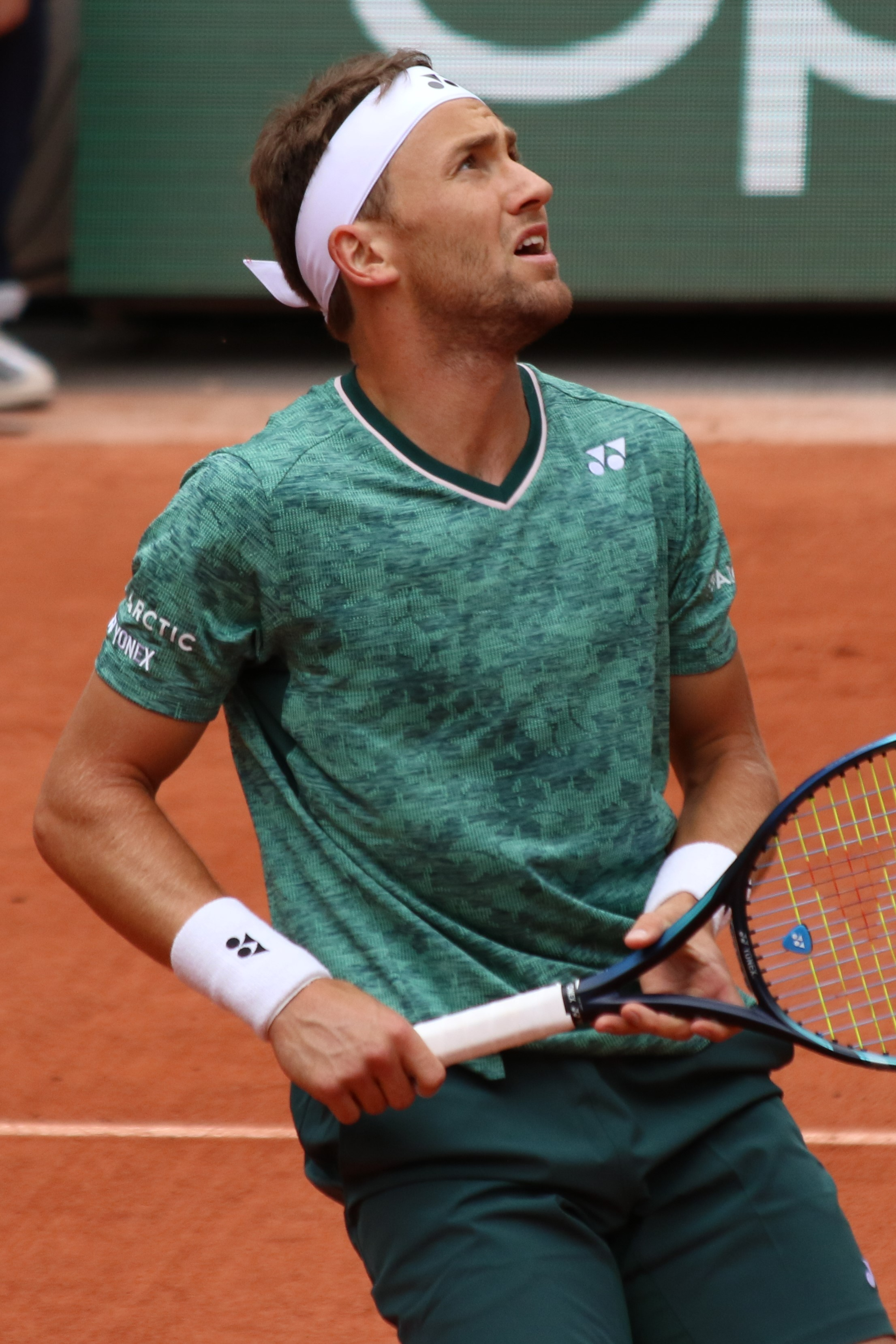
Ruud

Team World

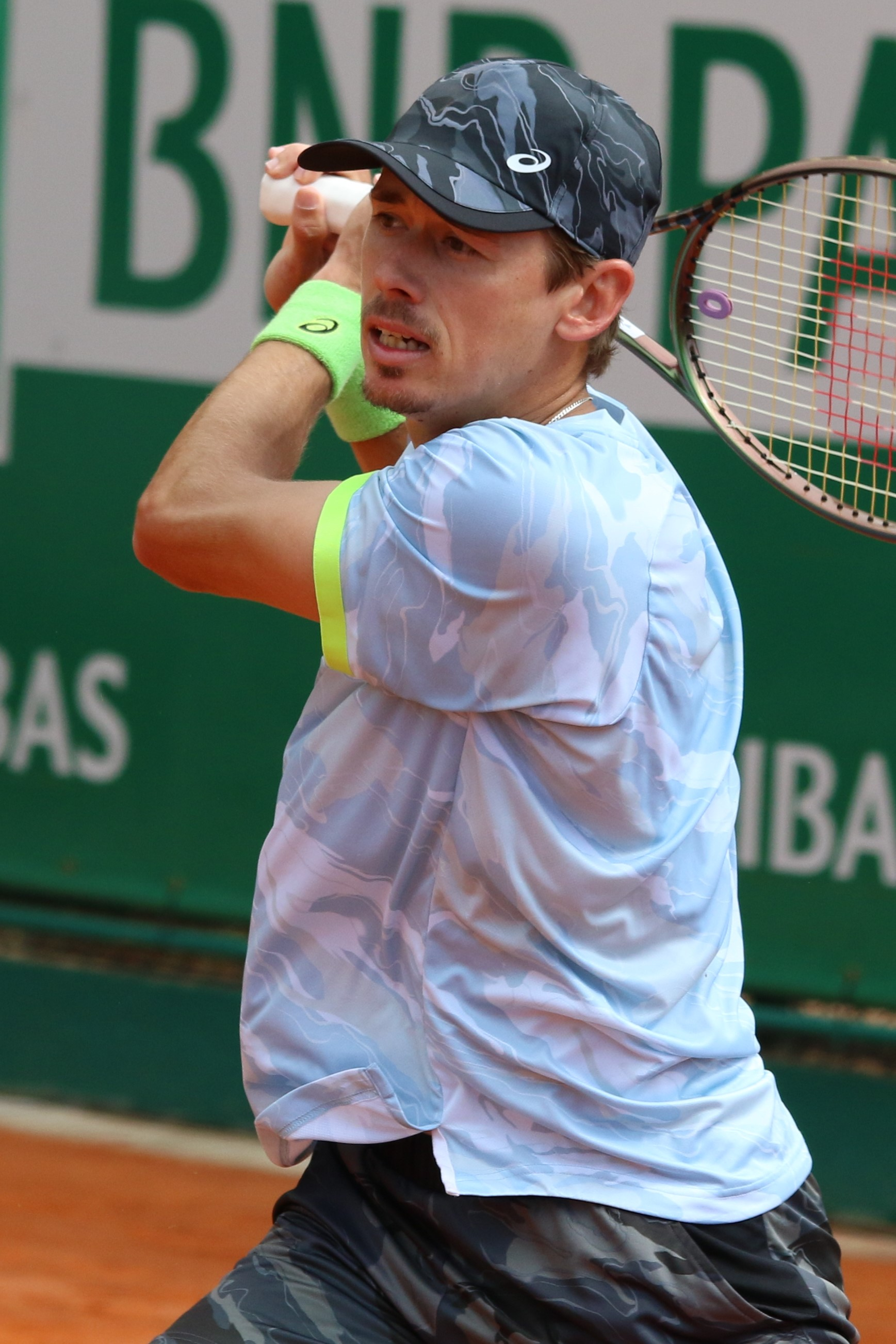
de Minaur

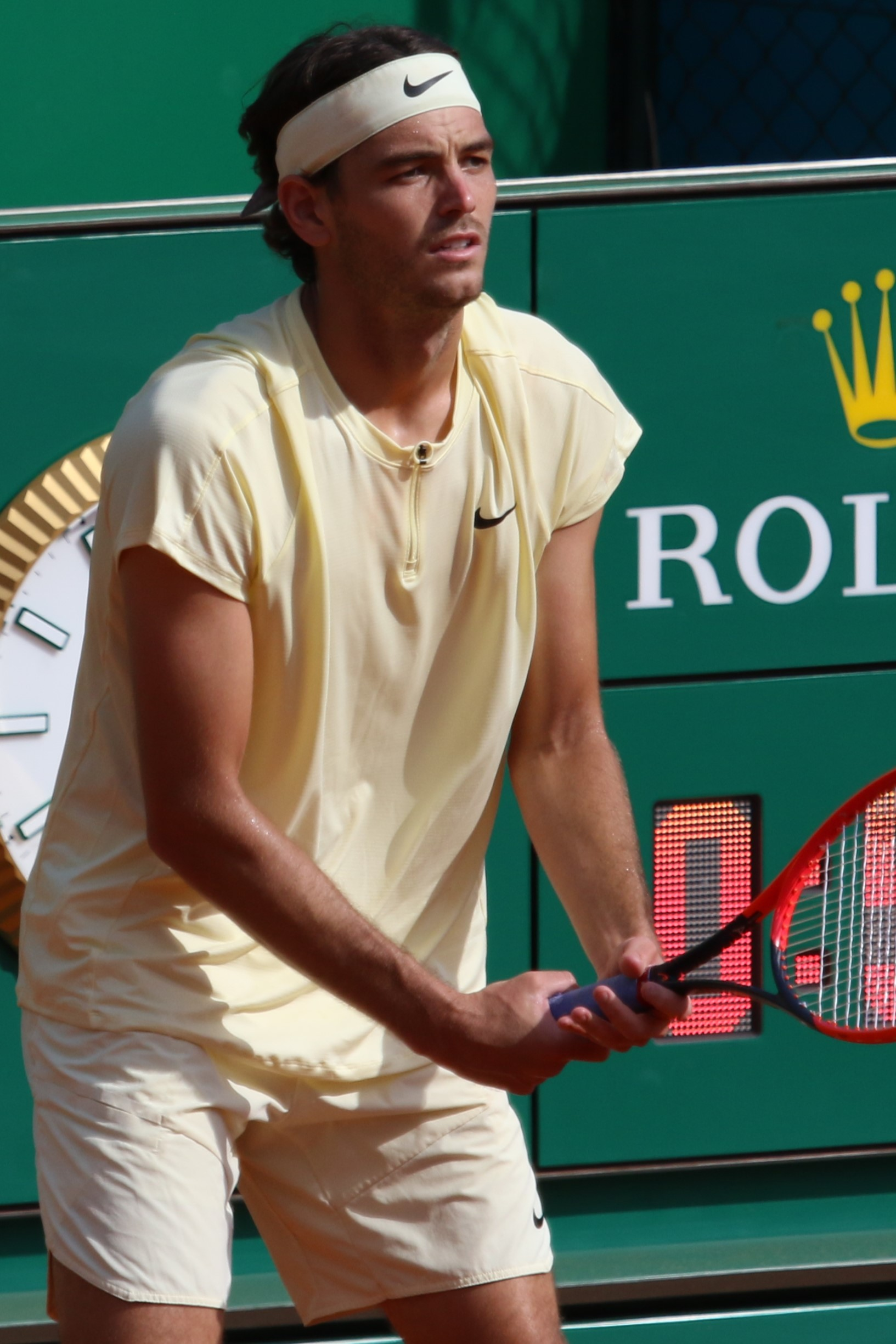
Fritz

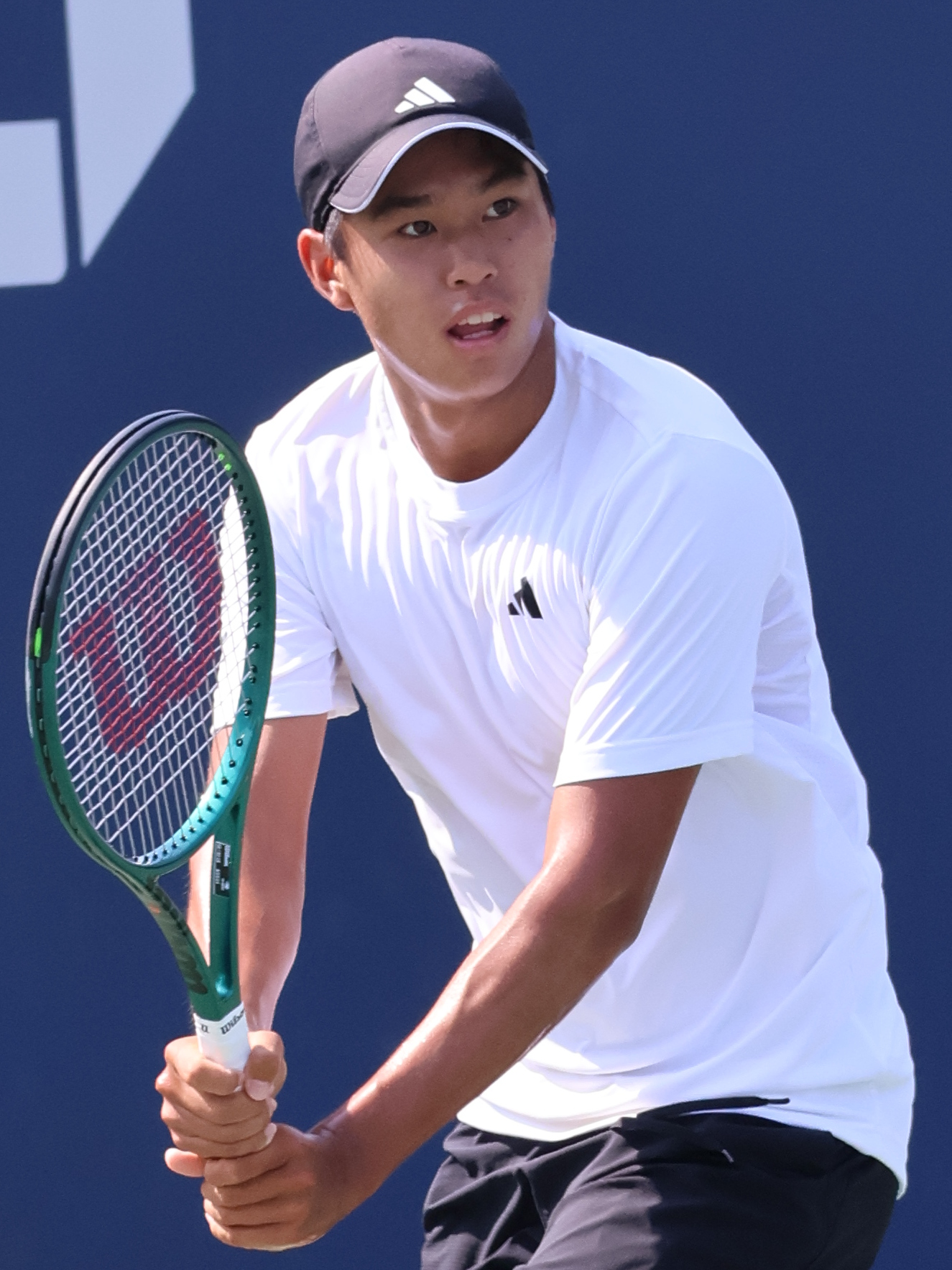
Tien

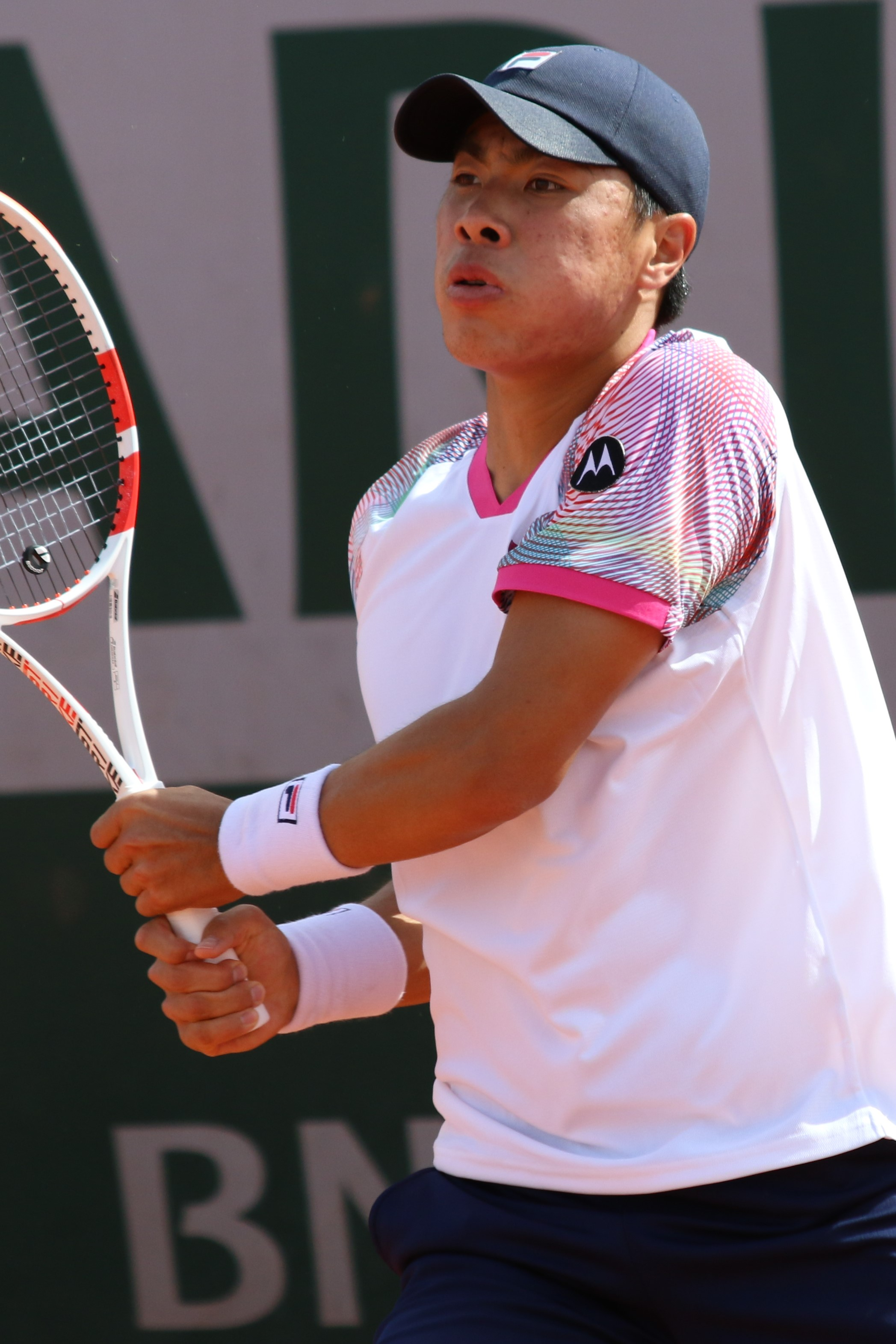
Nakashima

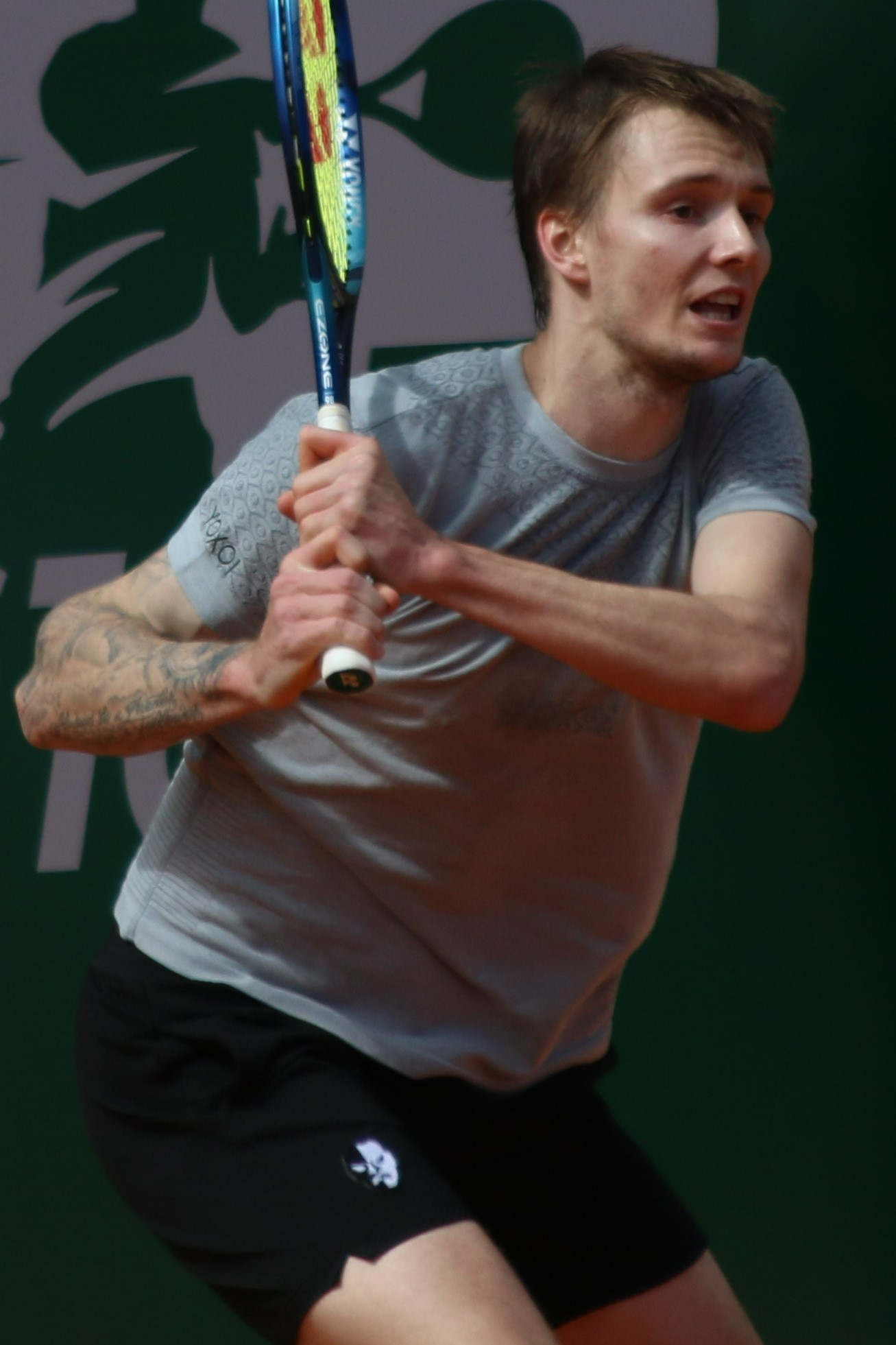
Bublik

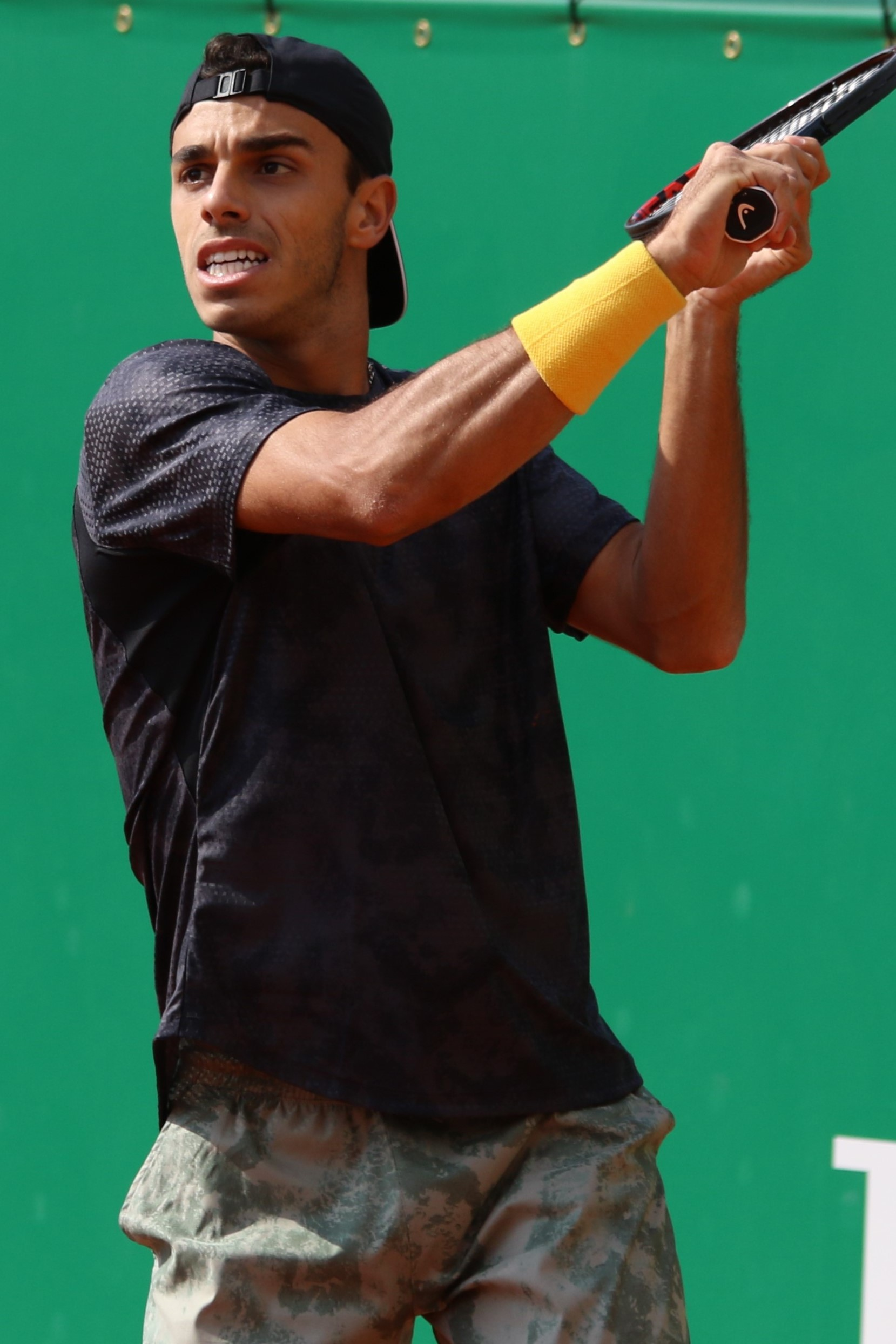
Cerúndolo

== Matches ==
Each match win on day 1 is worth one point, on day 2 two points, and on day 3 three points. The first team reaching 13 points will win.

Day	Date	Match type	Team Europe	Team World	Score	Team points after match
1	25 Sep	Singles	(Norway) Casper Ruud	(Argentina) Francisco Cerúndolo	6–7^{(4–7)}, 6–4, [10–8]	1–0
1	25 Sep	Singles	(Czech Republic) Jakub Menšík	(United States) Brandon Nakashima	1–6, 6–3, [7–10]	1–1
1	25 Sep	Singles	(Spain) Rafael Jódar	(Kazakhstan) Alexander Bublik	6–2, 6–3	2–1
1	25 Sep	Doubles	(Spain) C Alcaraz / (Czech Republic) J Menšík	(Kazakhstan) A Bublik / (United States) T Fritz	6–4, 6–4	3–1
2	26 Sep	Singles	(Italy) Flavio Cobolli	(United States) Learner Tien	3–6, 6–2, [7–10]	3–3
2	26 Sep	Singles	(Germany) Alexander Zverev	(Australia) Alex de Minaur	6–2, 6–7^{(5–7)}, [9–11]	3–5
2	26 Sep	Singles	(Spain) Carlos Alcaraz	(United States) Taylor Fritz	6–3, 4–6, [13–11]	5–5
2	26 Sep	Doubles	(Norway) C Ruud / (Germany) A Zverev	(Kazakhstan) A Bublik / (United States) B Nakashima	6–4, 7–6^{(9–7)}	7–5
3	27 Sep	Doubles	(Italy) F Cobolli / (Czech Republic) J Menšík	(Australia) A de Minaur / (United States) T Fritz	7–5, 6–3	10–5
3	27 Sep	Singles	(Germany) Alexander Zverev	(United States) Learner Tien	7–6^{(7–3)}, 6–3	13–5
3	27 Sep	Singles	(Spain) Carlos Alcaraz	(Australia) Alex de Minaur	not played	
3	27 Sep	Singles	(Spain) Rafael Jódar	(United States) Taylor Fritz	not played	

== Player statistics ==
Player	Team	Nat	Matches	Matches win–loss			Points win–loss		
Player	Team	Nat	Matches	Singles	Doubles	Total	Singles	Doubles	Total
Carlos Alcaraz	Europe	(Spain)	2	1–0	1–0	2–0	2–0	1–0	3–0
Alexander Bublik	World	(Kazakhstan)	3	0–1	0–2	0–3	0–1	0–3	0–4
Francisco Cerúndolo	World	(Argentina)	1	0–1	0–0	0–1	0–1	0–0	0–1
Flavio Cobolli	Europe	(Italy)	2	0–1	1–0	1–1	0–2	3–0	3–2
Alex de Minaur	World	(Australia)	2	1–0	0–1	1–1	2–0	0–3	2–3
Taylor Fritz	World	(United States)	3	0–1	0–2	0–3	0–2	0–4	0–6
Rafael Jódar	Europe	(Spain)	1	1–0	0–0	1–0	1–0	0–0	1–0
Jakub Menšík	Europe	(Czech Republic)	3	0–1	2–0	2–1	0–1	4–0	4–1
Brandon Nakashima	World	(United States)	2	1–0	0–1	1–1	1–0	0–2	1–2
Casper Ruud	Europe	(Norway)	2	1–0	1–0	2–0	1–0	2–0	3–0
Learner Tien	World	(United States)	2	1–1	0–0	1–1	2–3	0–0	2–3
Alexander Zverev	Europe	(Germany)	3	1–1	1–0	2–1	3–2	2–0	5–2
