= 2025 Laver Cup =

- Date: 19–21 September 2025
- Edition: 8th
- Surface: Hard (indoor)
- Location: San Francisco, United States
- Venue: Chase Center

Champions
- Team World; 15 – 9
- Laver Cup

The 2025 Laver Cup was the eighth edition of the Laver Cup, a men's tennis tournament between teams from Europe and the rest of the world. Held at the Chase Center in San Francisco, United States from 19–21 September, it was held on a hard court on the arena floor. Yannick Noah and Andre Agassi served as team captains, both for the first time. Team World defeated Team Europe 15–9 to earn their third title.

== Player selection ==
On 2 December 2024, Carlos Alcaraz and Taylor Fritz were the first players to confirm their participation for Team Europe and Team World respectively. On 20 February 2025, Alexander Zverev and Ben Shelton were the next players to announce their participation. Tommy Paul was confirmed for the event on 1 April 2025. On 13 May 2025, organizers announced that Holger Rune and João Fonseca would make their Laver Cup debuts. On 30 July 2025, Casper Ruud and on 12 August, Frances Tiafoe announced their participation in the event.

On 19 August 2025, both teams announced their final line-ups. As their final picks, Team Europe captain Yannick Noah chose Jakub Menšík and Flavio Cobolli while Team World captain Andre Agassi named Francisco Cerúndolo. On 4 September 2025, Shelton and Paul withdrew due to injuries and were replaced by Alex Michelsen and Reilly Opelka. On 12 September 2025, Tiafoe withdrew and was replaced by Alex de Minaur. On 15 September 2025, Tomáš Macháč and Jenson Brooksby were announced as alternates.

== Participants ==
Team Europe
Captain: (France) Yannick Noah
Vice-captain: (United Kingdom) Tim Henman
Player	Rank
(Spain) Carlos Alcaraz	1
(Germany) Alexander Zverev	3
(Denmark) Holger Rune	11
(Norway) Casper Ruud	12
(Czech Republic) Jakub Menšík	17
(Italy) Flavio Cobolli	25
(Czech Republic) Tomáš Macháč	22

Team World
Captain: (United States) Andre Agassi
Vice-captain: (Australia) Pat Rafter
Player	Rank
(United States) Taylor Fritz	5
(United States) ~~Ben Shelton~~	6
(Australia) Alex de Minaur	8
(United States) ~~Tommy Paul~~	15
(Argentina) Francisco Cerúndolo	21
(United States) ~~Frances Tiafoe~~	29
(United States) Alex Michelsen	32
(Brazil) João Fonseca	42
(United States) Reilly Opelka	62
(United States) Jenson Brooksby	86

- Singles rankings as of 15 September 2025

Withdrew
Alternate

Team Europe

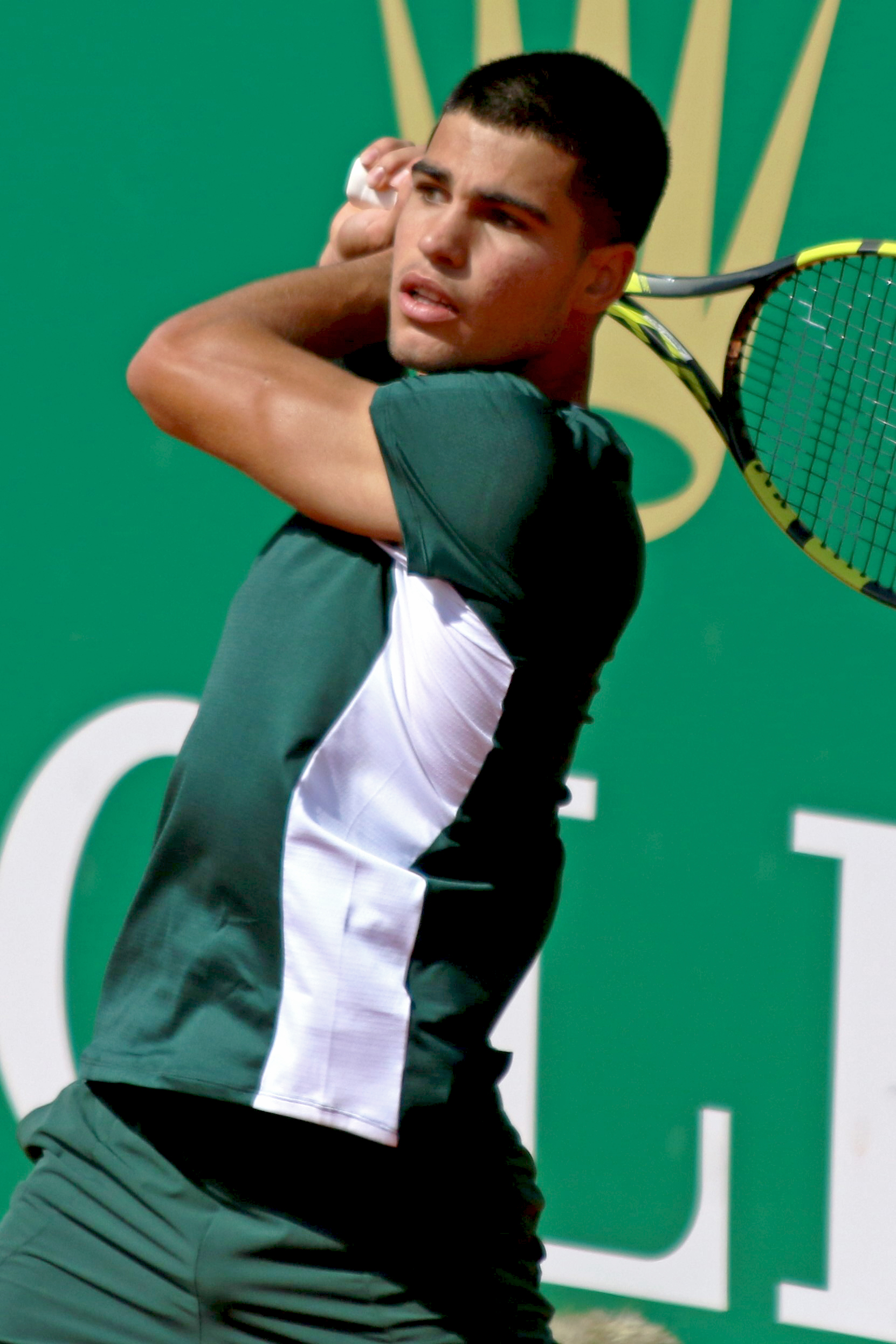
Alcaraz

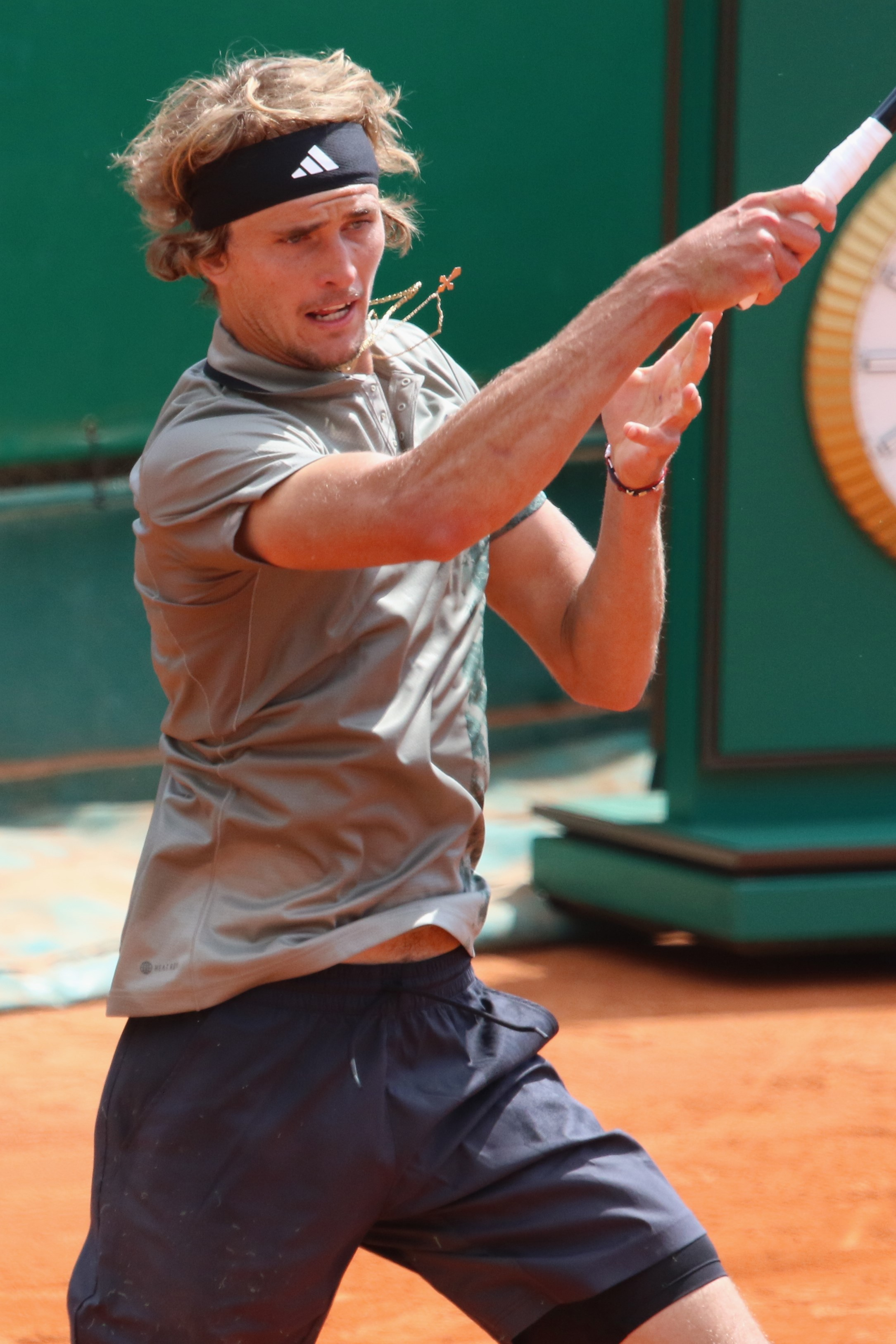
Zverev

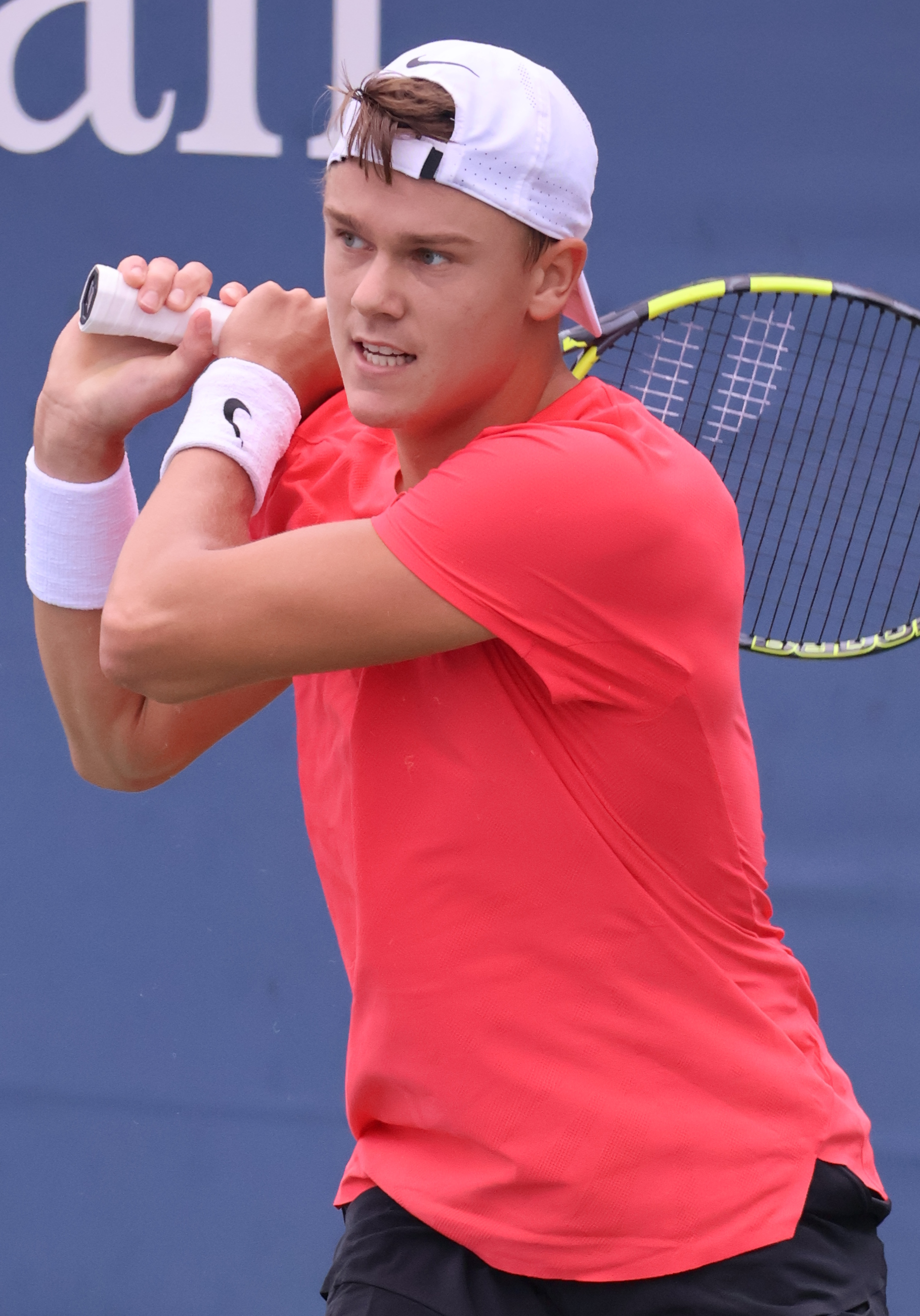
Rune

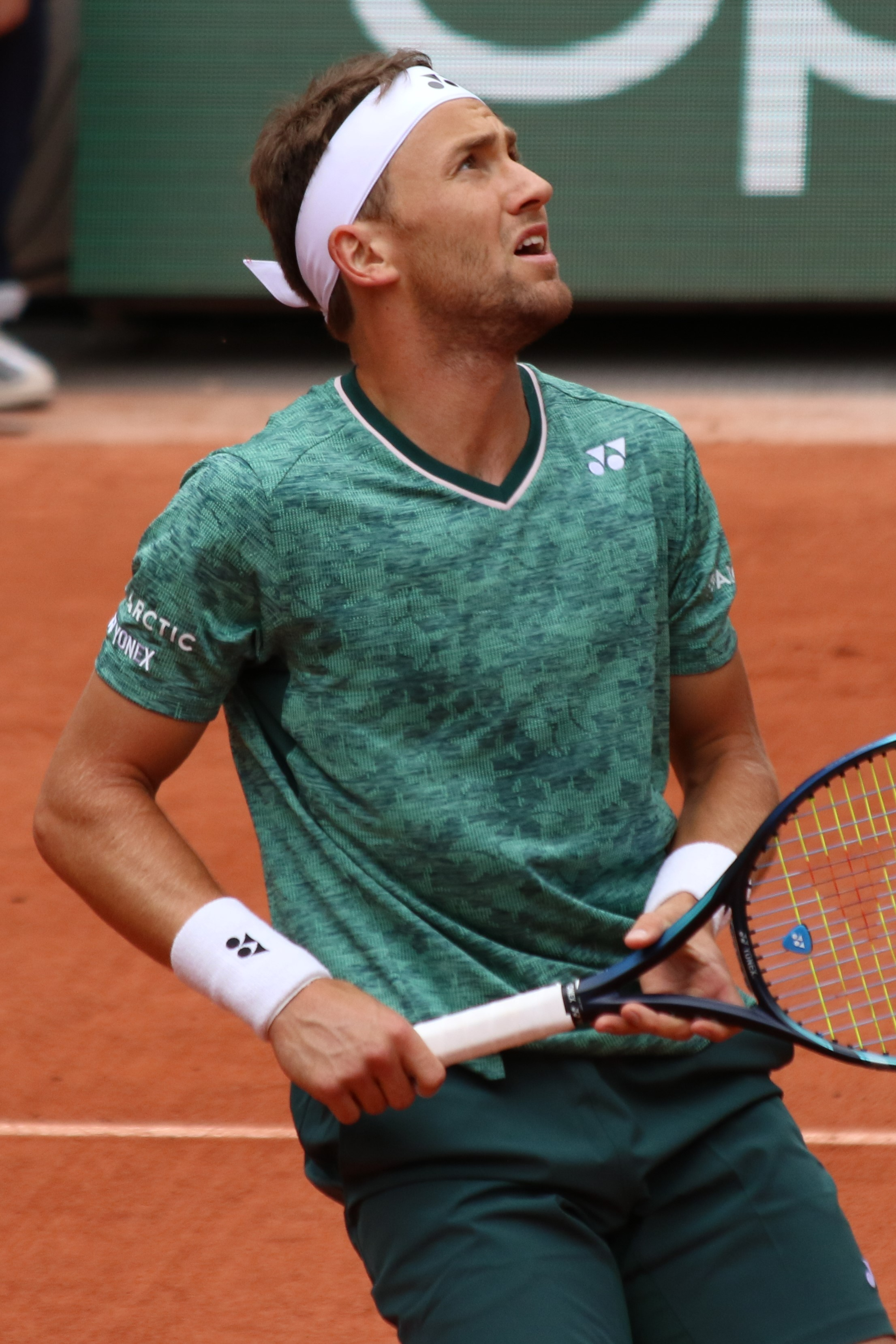
Ruud

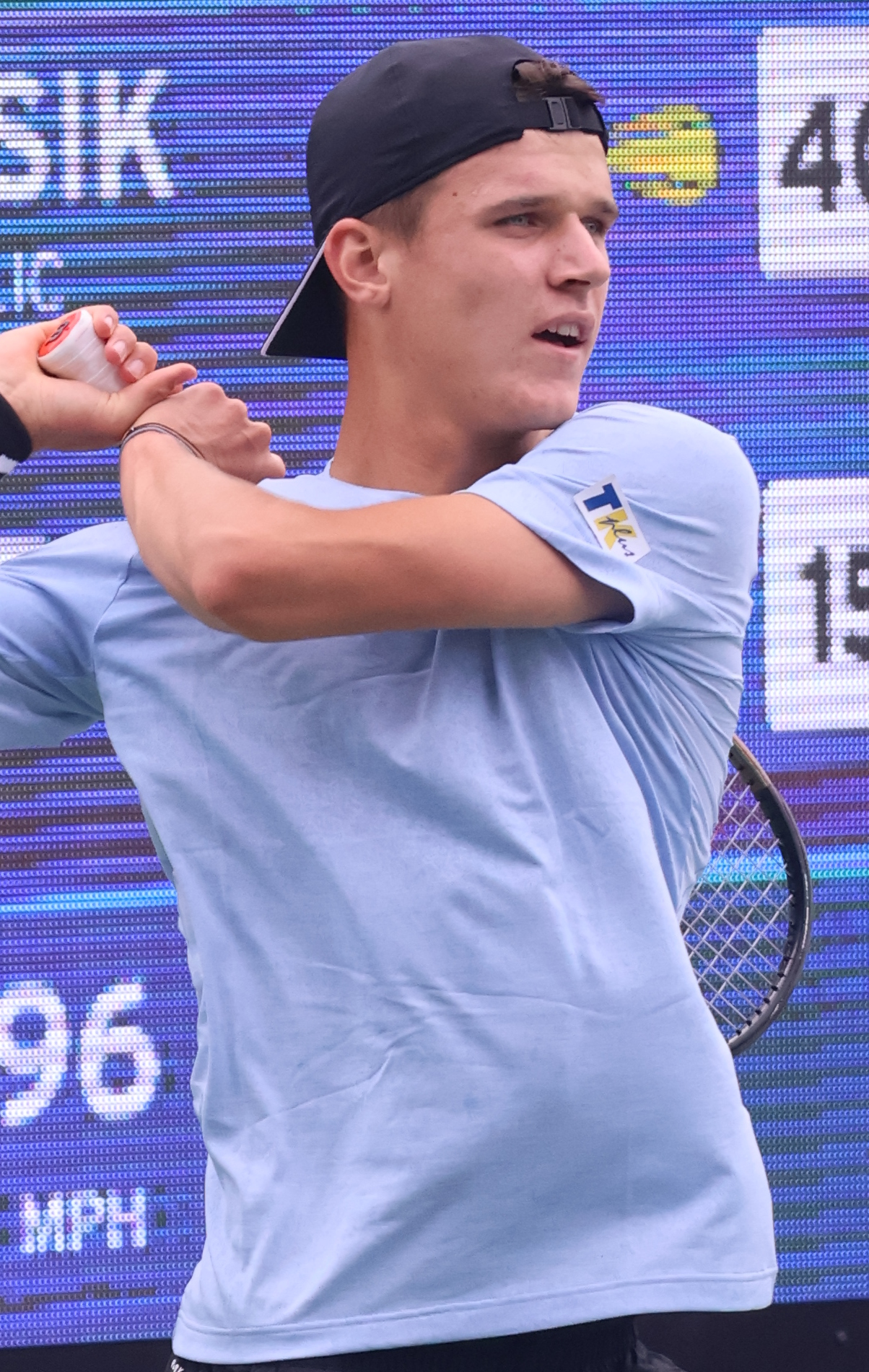
Menšík

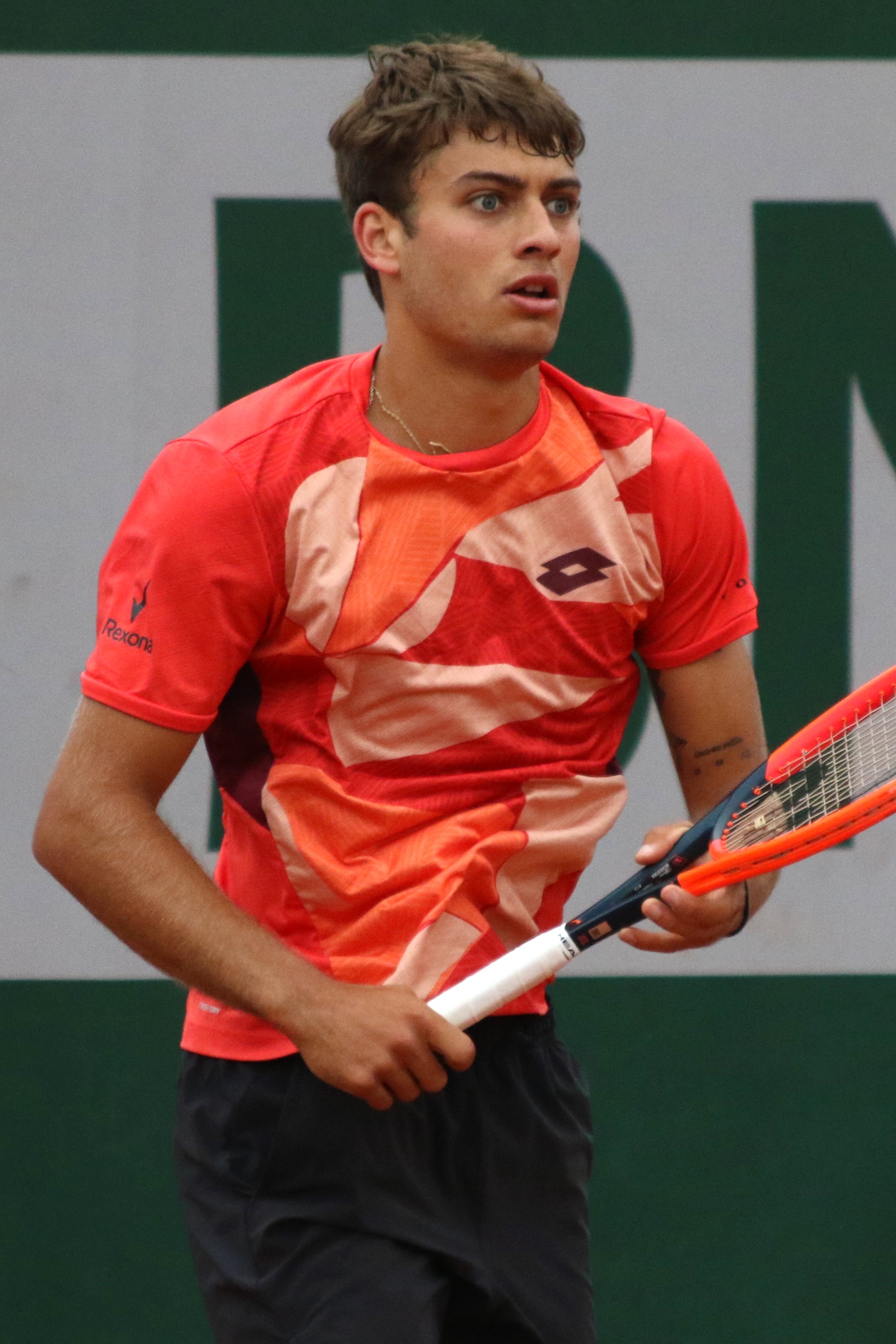
Cobolli

Team World

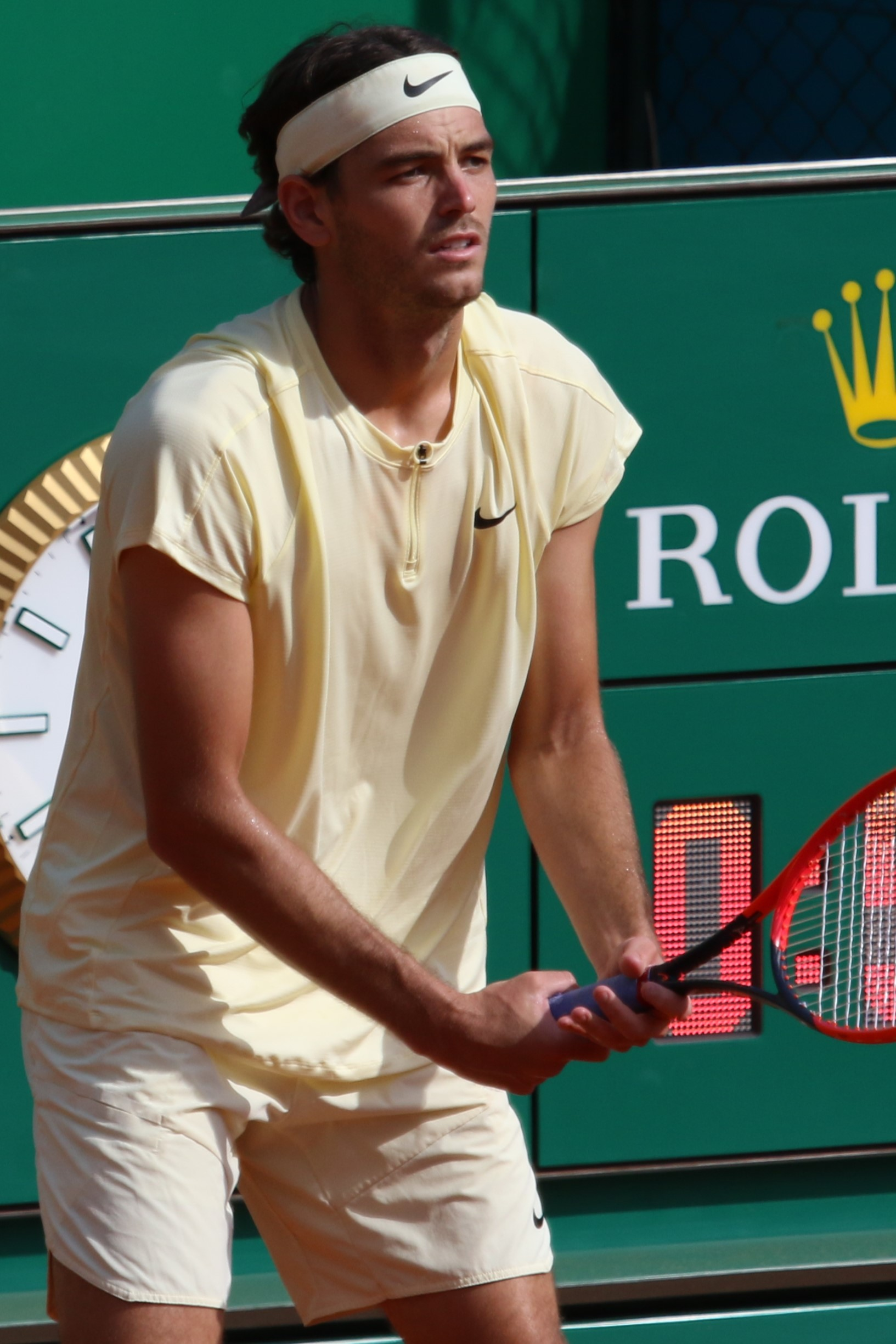
Fritz

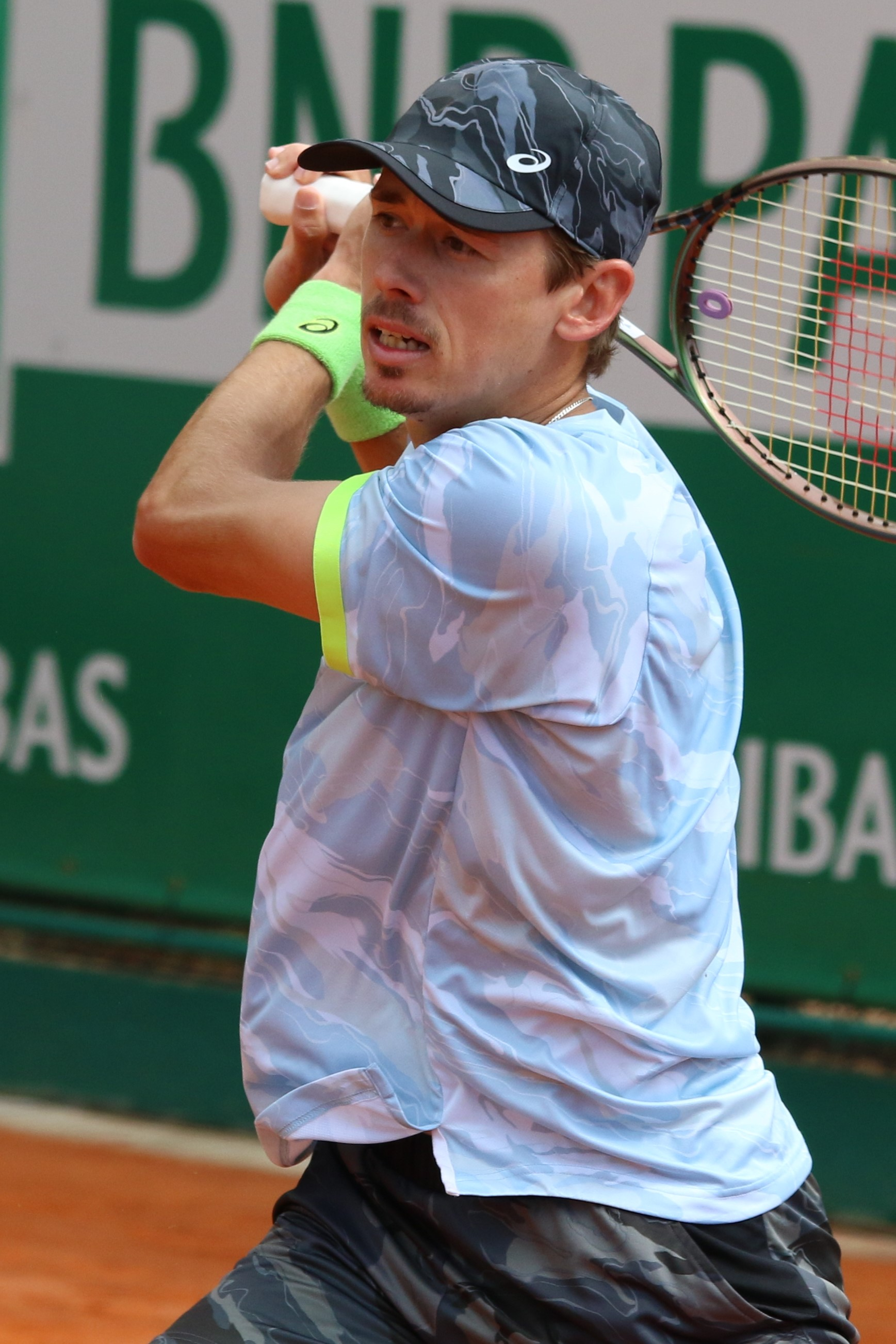
de Minaur

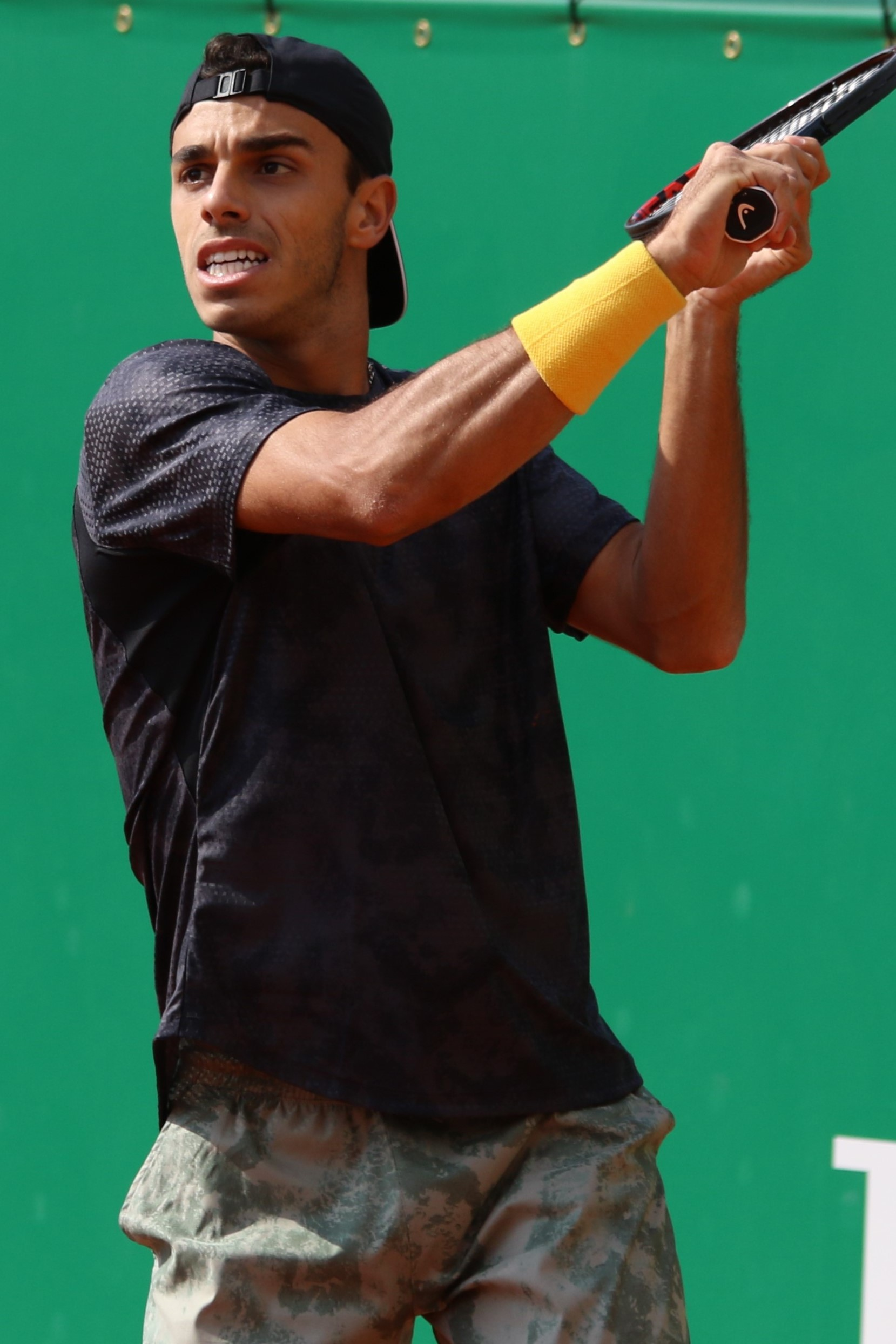
Cerúndolo

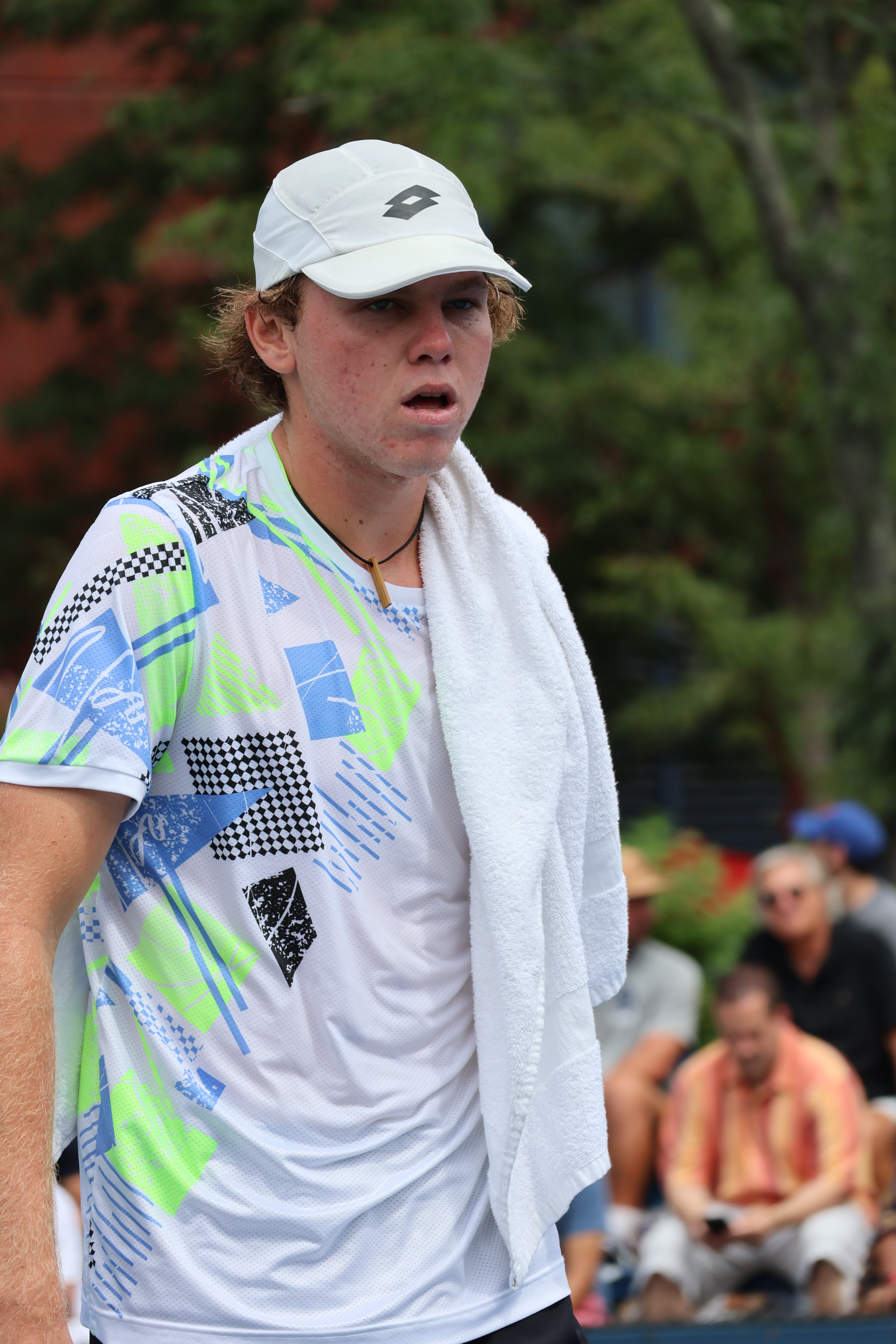
Michelsen

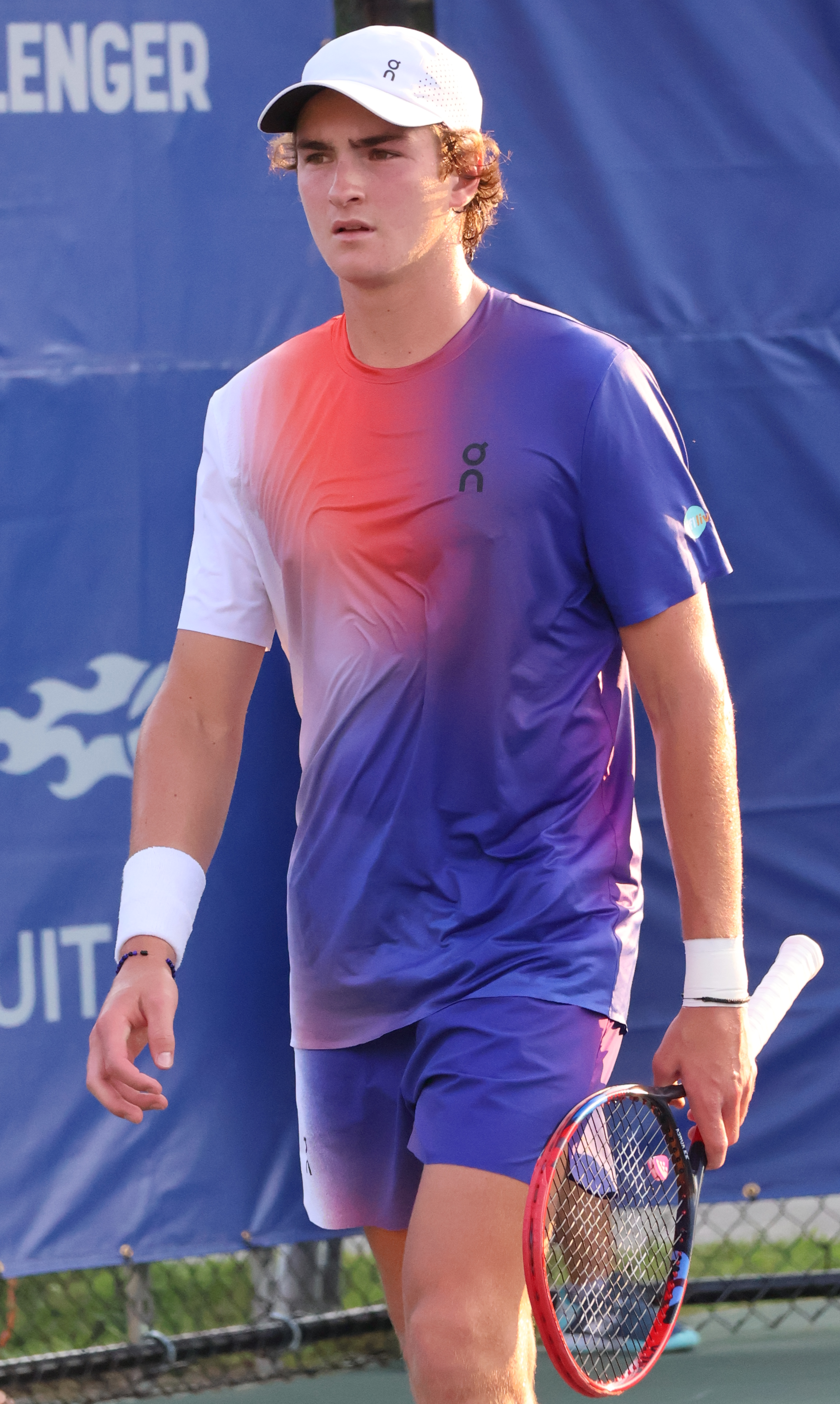
Fonseca

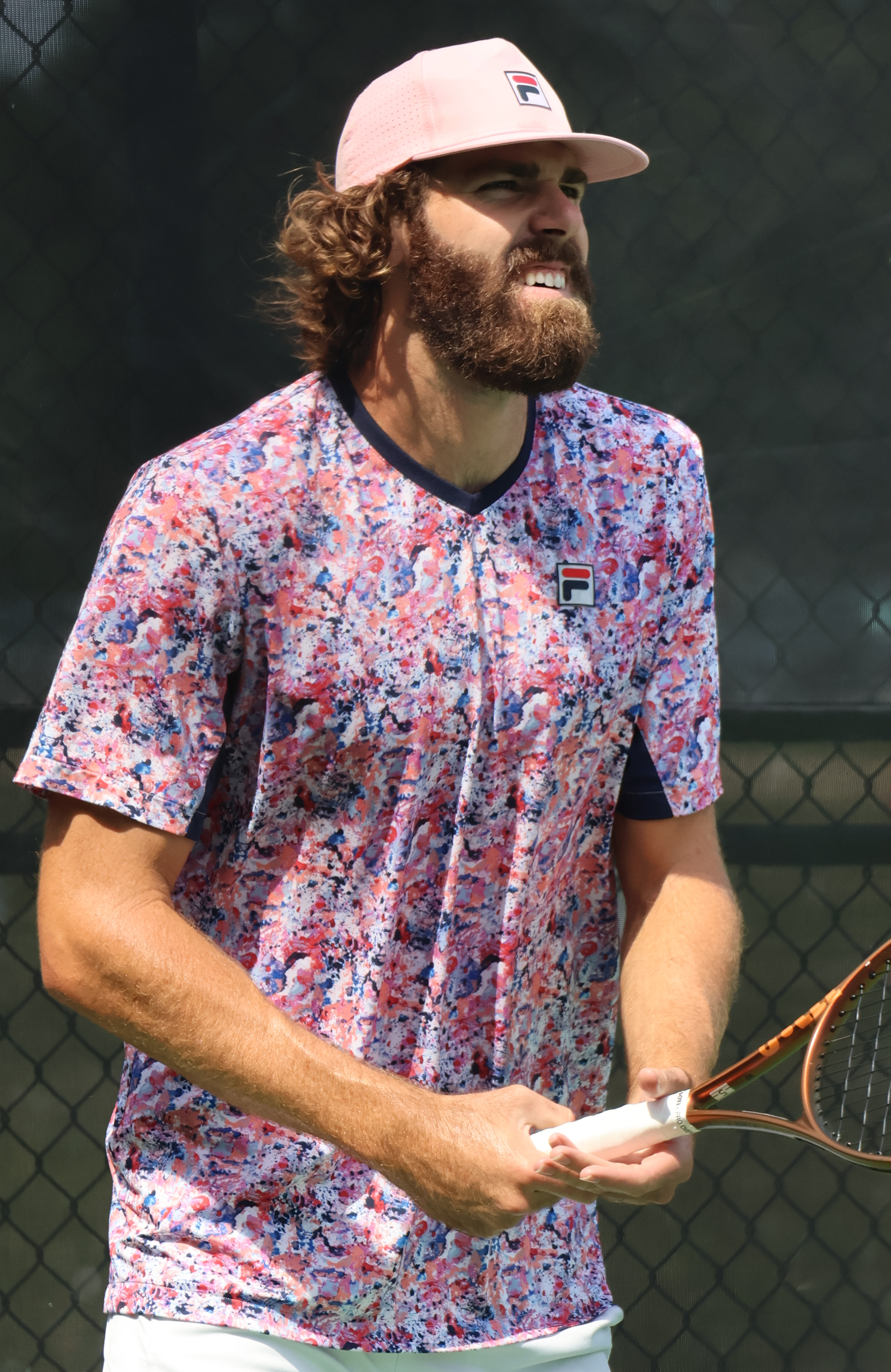
Opelka

== Matches ==
Each match win on day 1 is worth one point, on day 2 two points, and on day 3 three points. The first team to 13 points will win.

Day	Date	Match type	Team Europe	Team World	Score	Team points after match
1	19 Sep	Singles	(Norway) Casper Ruud	(United States) Reilly Opelka	6–4, 7–6^{(7–4)}	1–0
1	19 Sep	Singles	(Czech Republic) Jakub Menšík	(United States) Alex Michelsen	6–1, 6–7^{(3–7)}, [10–8]	2–0
1	19 Sep	Singles	(Italy) Flavio Cobolli	(Brazil) João Fonseca	4–6, 3–6	2–1
1	19 Sep	Doubles	(Spain) C Alcaraz / (Czech Republic) J Menšík	(United States) T Fritz / (United States) A Michelsen	7–6^{(9–7)}, 6–4	3–1
2	20 Sep	Singles	(Germany) Alexander Zverev	(Australia) Alex de Minaur	1–6, 4–6	3–3
2	20 Sep	Singles	(Denmark) Holger Rune	(Argentina) Francisco Cerúndolo	3–6, 6–7^{(5–7)}	3–5
2	20 Sep	Singles	(Spain) Carlos Alcaraz	(United States) Taylor Fritz	3–6, 2–6	3–7
2	20 Sep	Doubles	(Denmark) H Rune / (Norway) C Ruud	(Australia) A de Minaur / (United States) A Michelsen	3–6, 4–6	3–9
3	21 Sep	Doubles	(Spain) C Alcaraz / (Norway) C Ruud	(United States) A Michelsen / (United States) R Opelka	7–6^{(7–4)}, 6–1	6–9
3	21 Sep	Singles	(Czech Republic) Jakub Menšík	(Australia) Alex de Minaur	3–6, 4–6	6–12
3	21 Sep	Singles	(Spain) Carlos Alcaraz	(Argentina) Francisco Cerúndolo	6–2, 6–1	9–12
3	21 Sep	Singles	(Germany) Alexander Zverev	(United States) Taylor Fritz	3–6, 6–7^{(4–7)}	9–15

== Player statistics ==
Player	Team	Nat	Matches	Matches win–loss			Points win–loss		
Player	Team	Nat	Matches	Singles	Doubles	Total	Singles	Doubles	Total
Carlos Alcaraz	Europe	(Spain)	4	1–1	2–0	3–1	3–2	4–0	7–2
Francisco Cerúndolo	World	(Argentina)	2	1–1	0–0	1–1	2–3	0–0	2–3
Flavio Cobolli	Europe	(Italy)	1	0–1	0–0	0–1	0–1	0–0	0–1
Alex de Minaur	World	(Australia)	3	2–0	1–0	3–0	5–0	2–0	7–0
João Fonseca	World	(Brazil)	1	1–0	0–0	1–0	1–0	0–0	1–0
Taylor Fritz	World	(United States)	3	2–0	0–1	2–1	5–0	0–1	5–1
Jakub Menšík	Europe	(Czech Republic)	3	1–1	1–0	2–1	1–3	1–0	2–3
Alex Michelsen	World	(United States)	4	0–1	1–2	1–3	0–1	2–4	2–5
Reilly Opelka	World	(United States)	2	0–1	0–1	0–2	0–1	0–3	0–4
Holger Rune	Europe	(Denmark)	2	0–1	0–1	0–2	0–2	0–2	0–4
Casper Ruud	Europe	(Norway)	3	1–0	1–1	2–1	1–0	3–2	4–2
Alexander Zverev	Europe	(Germany)	2	0–2	0–0	0–2	0–5	0–0	0–5
