= Laver Cup =

International men's indoor tennis tournament

- 2026 Laver Cup

ATP Tour
- Founded: 2017
- Editions: 9 (2026)
- Location: European city, world city rotation
- Surface: Hard (indoor)
- Draw: 2 teams (Team Europe vs. Team World)
- Website: https://lavercup.com/

The Laver Cup is an international indoor hard court men's team tennis tournament between Team Europe and Team World, the latter of which is composed of players from all other continents except Europe. Held annually since 2017, the tournament is intended to be tennis’ version of the Ryder Cup. It normally takes place two weeks after the US Open, with the location rotating between various host cities (that usually do not have an ATP Tour event); alternating yearly between European cities and cities in the rest of the world.

In addition to the guaranteed participation fees which are based upon the players' ATP rankings, each member of the winning team receives $250,000 in prize money, but the tournament itself does not count towards the players' point totals in the ATP Tour for that year. In May 2019, the Laver Cup became an officially sanctioned ATP Tour event, and the Laver Cup and the ATP renewed their agreement in 2024.

Matches during the Laver Cup tournament differ from conventional three-set matches played on the ATP Tour; in the event when the match is tied at one set all, a 10-point "match tiebreak" is played instead of a deciding final set. In addition, unlike conventional ATP tour matches, coaching of match participants is commonly applied courtside by teammates and team captains.

== Format ==
The competition pits six top European players against six of their counterparts from the rest of the world. Each team is led by a team captain, who is a tennis legend. Three of the six players qualify based on their ATP singles ranking as of the Monday following the French Open in June. Three are "captain's picks", announced by the start of the US Open, in August.

There are 12 matches played over three days (nine singles and three doubles). Each match victory on day 1 is worth one point, on day 2 two points, and on day 3 three points. The first team to claim 13 points wins the tournament. Therefore, the winning team can only be decided on day 3.

There are six singles matches on the first two days (3 each day) and all six team players play one of those matches. No player plays singles more than twice. At least four of the six team members take part in doubles. So, one team player (doubles specialist) could play all three doubles matches with three other team players. All matches start as two sets, a 10-point “match tiebreak” is played if the match is level at one set all.

In the event both teams are tied at 12 points each, a fifth match known as “The Decider” is played on day 3, whereby one set is played as a regular set with ad scoring and a tiebreak.

In the event that only one match is required on Sunday (last previous occurrence was at the 2023 Laver Cup), an exhibition match is played following the trophy ceremony.

== Trophy ==
The Laver Cup trophy was designed by London design agency Designwerk and hand crafted by London-based Goldsmiths and Silversmiths, Thomas Lyte. The trophy contains a number of distinctive features that directly reflect Rod Laver's career. The trophy is shaped to reflect Laver's famous ‘Rocket’ moniker, while the 200 notches around the rim of the trophy individually signify the number of career titles won by the Australian.

The trophy features four rings at its base, each of which represents Laver's Grand Slam sweeps in 1962 and 1969. Molten metal from part of Laver's New England Merchant Bank Trophy from the US Pro Tennis Championships was also incorporated into the body of the trophy. It took over 400 hours to complete and stands at a height of 66cm and weighs 14kg.

Thomas Lyte produced a series of mini-trophies for the winners of the competition. Mirroring the Laver Cup itself, the half-height miniatures were first awarded to the winners of the 2017 tournament.

== Tournament schedule ==
Laver Cup tournament schedule
Day	Session	Matches	Start time (local time)	Points per match	Points available
1	Day	2 singles	1 p.m.	1	4
1	Night	1 singles, 1 doubles	7 p.m.	1	4
2	Day	2 singles	1 p.m.	2	8
2	Night	1 singles, 1 doubles	7 p.m.	2	8
3	Day	1 doubles, 3 singles	12 p.m.	3	12

== History ==
The tournament is named after Australian Rod Laver, a tennis player widely regarded as one of the greatest in the history of the sport. Most notably, he won all four major titles in the same calendar year (the Grand Slam) in 1962 and 1969; the latter remains the only time a man has done so in the Open Era. Roger Federer's management company, TEAM8, Brazilian businessman Jorge Paulo Lemann, and Tennis Australia partnered to create the Laver Cup. Roger Federer was inspired to create a tennis team tournament based on the biennial Ryder Cup golf tournament, which features the best golfers from the United States playing against the best golfers from Europe. However, Laver Cup differs as it is purely an invitational event based on past historical performances; selection of (and the playing agreement with) the tournament participants are not automatically based from the highest ranked players of the recent ATP Tour world rankings.

Former rivals Björn Borg of Sweden (Team Europe) and John McEnroe of the United States (Team World) were announced to serve as captains for at least the first three editions. After the 2019 edition, they announced that they would reprise their roles as team captains for a fourth straight edition.

=== 2017: Inaugural edition ===
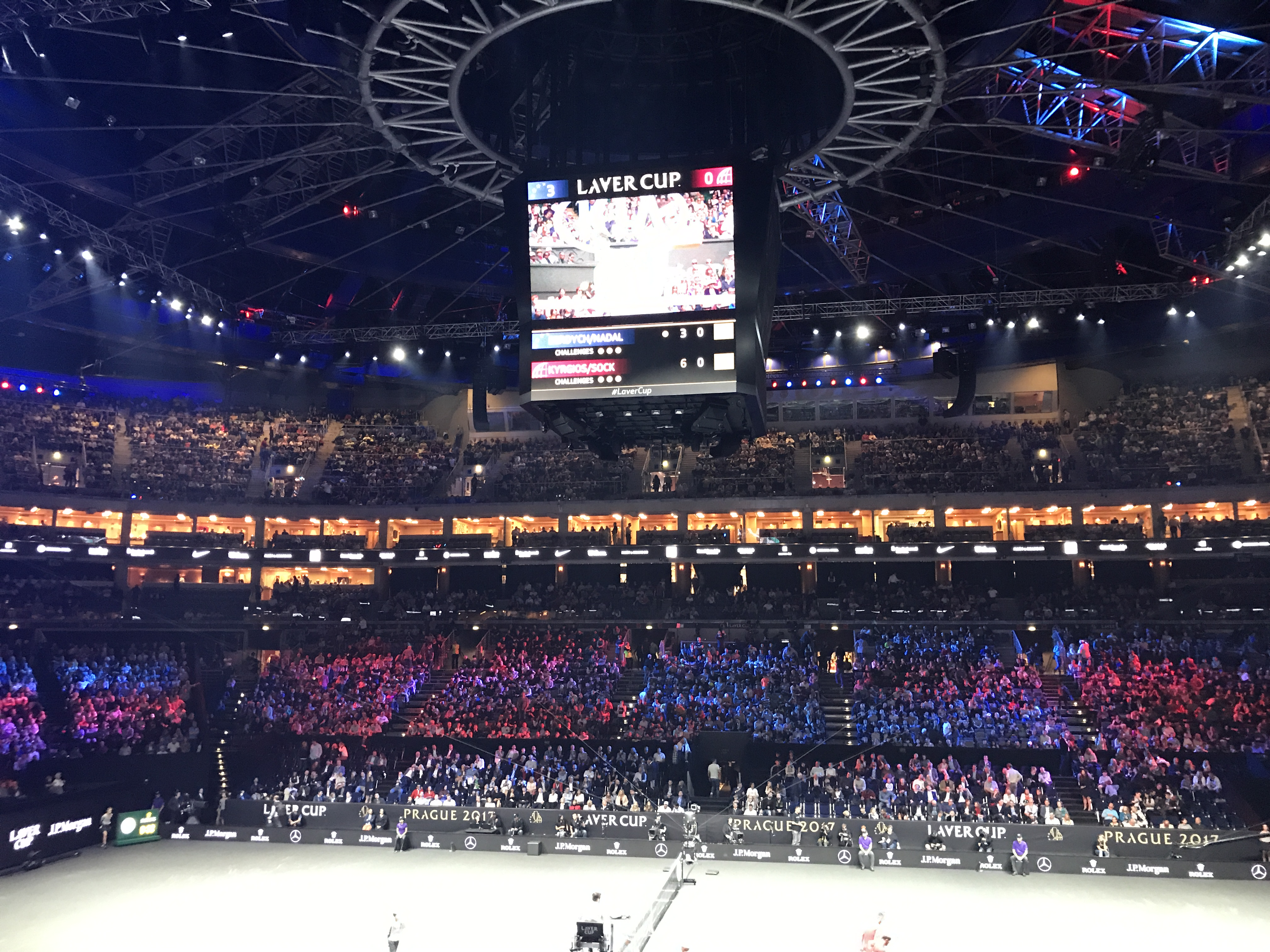
The O2 Arena in Prague during the first Laver Cup.

The first edition was held in Prague from 22 to 24 September 2017, at the O2 Arena. Team Europe defeated Team World 15–9. Despite the 6 point score difference, this was a very tight battle from day 1. In the last match, Roger Federer defeated Nick Kyrgios 4–6, 7–6^{(8–6)}, [11–9] after coming back from 8–5 down in the final tiebreak, as well as saving a match point at 9–8.

Team Europe
Captain: (Sweden) Björn Borg
Player	Rank
(Spain) Rafael Nadal	1
(Switzerland) Roger Federer	2
(Germany) Alexander Zverev	4
(Croatia) Marin Čilić	5
(Austria) Dominic Thiem	7
(Czech Republic) Tomáš Berdych	19

Team World
Captain: (United States) John McEnroe
Player	Rank
(United States) Sam Querrey	16
(United States) John Isner	17
(Australia) Nick Kyrgios	20
(United States) Jack Sock	21
(Canada) Denis Shapovalov	51
(United States) Frances Tiafoe	72

- Singles rankings as of 18 September 2017

=== 2018 ===
The second edition was held in Chicago from 21 to 23 September 2018, at the United Center. Team Europe defeated Team World 13–8.

Team Europe
Captain: (Sweden) Björn Borg
Player	Rank
(Switzerland) Roger Federer	2
(Serbia) Novak Djokovic	3
(Germany) Alexander Zverev	5
(Bulgaria) Grigor Dimitrov	7
(Belgium) David Goffin	11
(United Kingdom) Kyle Edmund	16

Team World
Captain: (United States) John McEnroe
Player	Rank
(South Africa) Kevin Anderson	9
(United States) John Isner	10
(Argentina) Diego Schwartzman	14
(United States) Jack Sock	17
(Australia) Nick Kyrgios	27
(United States) Frances Tiafoe	40

- Singles rankings as of 17 September 2018

=== 2019 ===
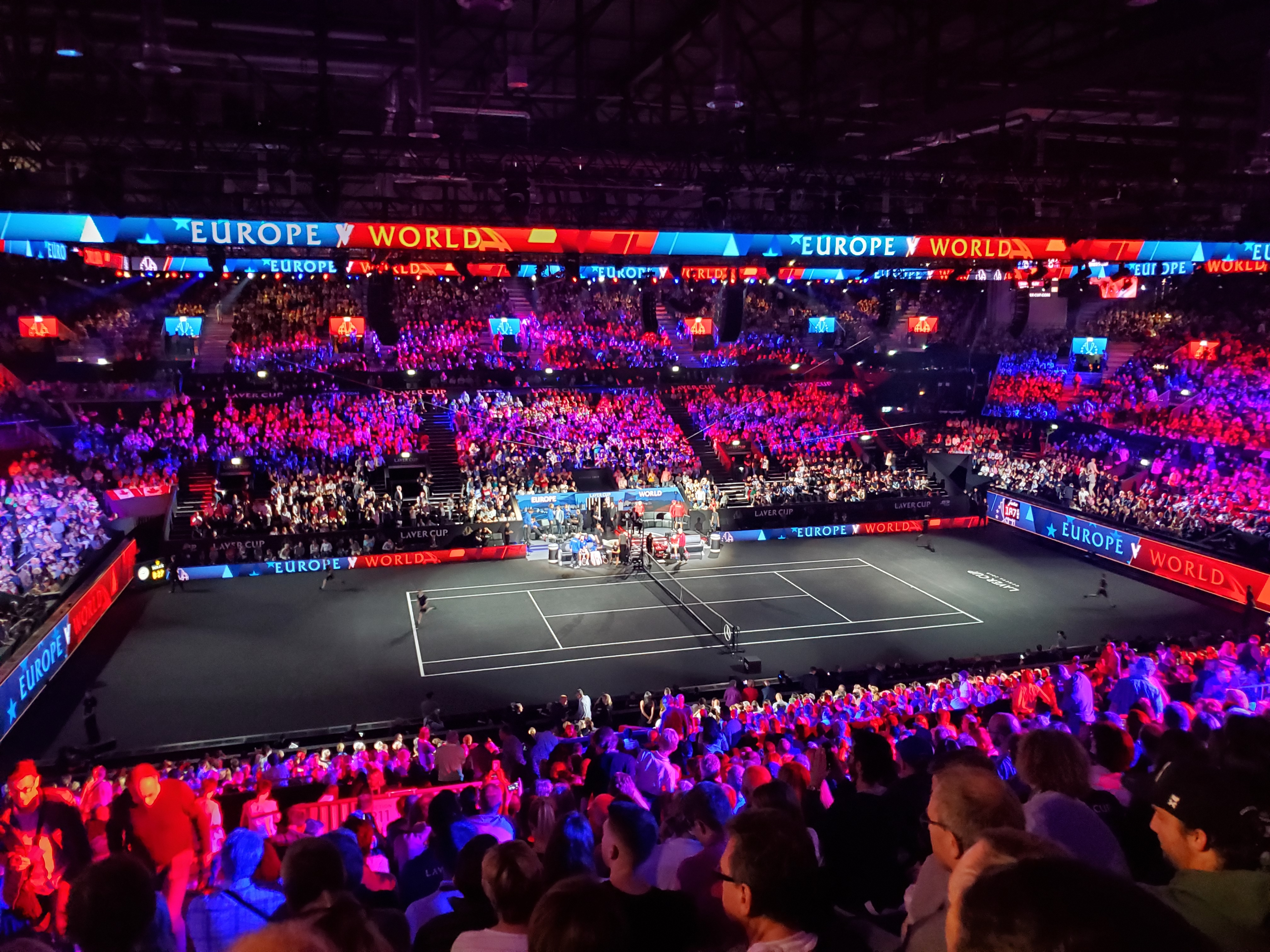
2019 Laver Cup at the Palexpo

The third edition was held in Geneva from 20 to 22 September 2019, at the Palexpo. Team Europe defeated Team World 13−11.

Team Europe
Captain: (Sweden) Björn Borg
Player	Rank
(Spain) Rafael Nadal	2
(Switzerland) Roger Federer	3
(Austria) Dominic Thiem	5
(Germany) Alexander Zverev	6
(Greece) Stefanos Tsitsipas	7
(Italy) Fabio Fognini	11

Team World
Captain: (United States) John McEnroe
Player	Rank
(United States) John Isner	20
(Canada) Milos Raonic	24
(Australia) Nick Kyrgios	27
(United States) Taylor Fritz	30
(Canada) Denis Shapovalov	33
(United States) Jack Sock	210

- Singles rankings as of 16 September 2019

=== 2021 ===
The fourth edition was held in Boston from 24 to 26 September 2021, at the TD Garden. Team Europe defeated Team World 14−1.

Team Europe
Captain: (Sweden) Björn Borg
Player	Rank
(Russia) Daniil Medvedev	2
(Greece) Stefanos Tsitsipas	3
(Germany) Alexander Zverev	4
(Russia) Andrey Rublev	5
(Italy) Matteo Berrettini	7
(Norway) Casper Ruud	10

Team World
Captain: (United States) John McEnroe
Player	Rank
(Canada) Félix Auger-Aliassime	11
(Canada) Denis Shapovalov	12
(Argentina) Diego Schwartzman	15
(United States) Reilly Opelka	19
(United States) John Isner	22
(Australia) Nick Kyrgios	95

- Singles rankings as of 20 September 2021

=== 2022 ===
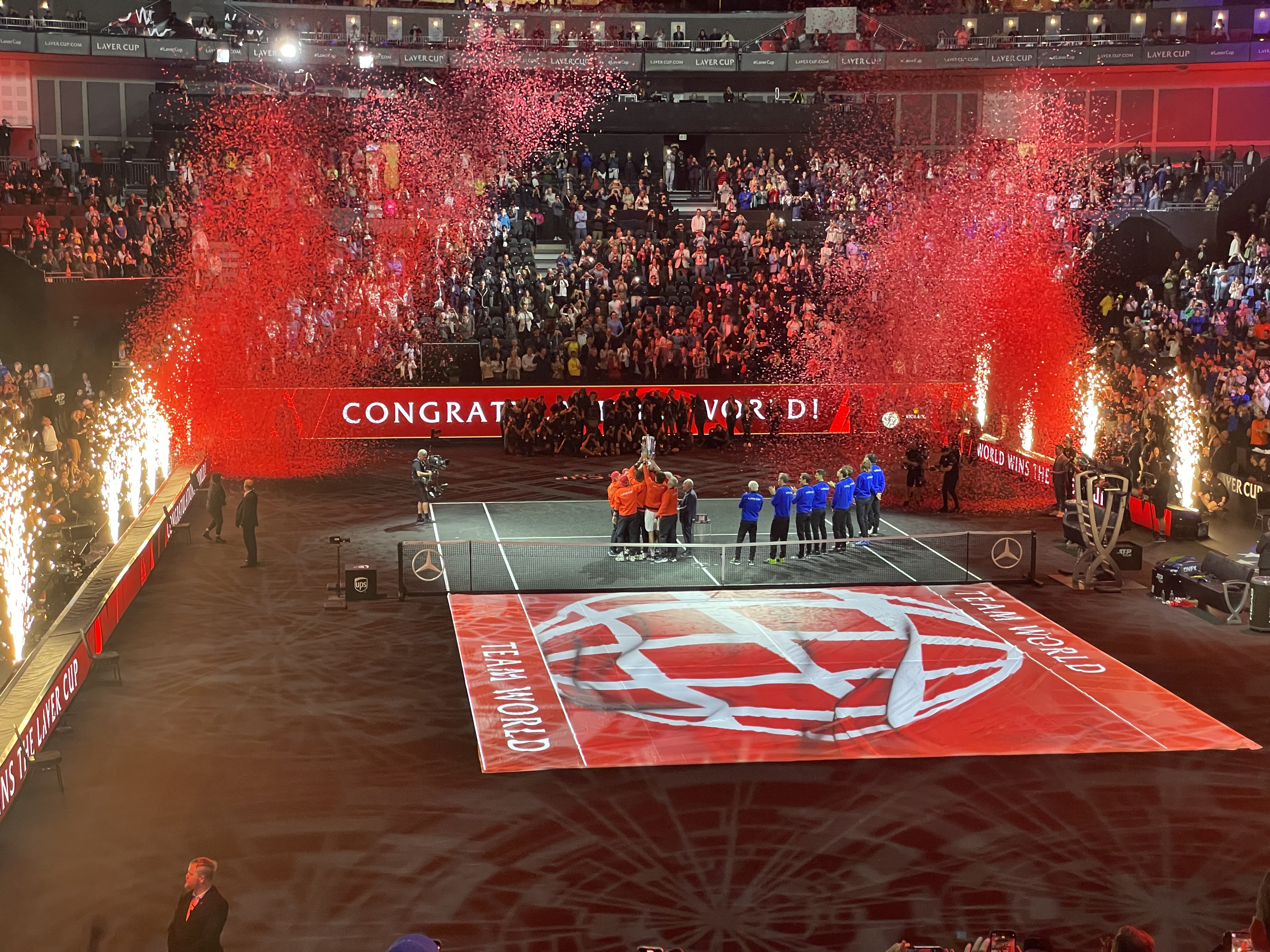
Team World gets their first win at the 2022 Laver Cup.

The fifth edition was held in London from 23 to 25 September 2022, at the O2 Arena.

This tournament marked the retirement of Roger Federer. Team World defeated Team Europe for the first time by a margin of 13−8.

Team Europe
Captain: (Sweden) Björn Borg
Player	Rank
(Norway) Casper Ruud	2
(Spain) Rafael Nadal*	3
(Greece) Stefanos Tsitsipas	6
(Serbia) Novak Djokovic	7
(United Kingdom) Andy Murray	43
(Switzerland) Roger Federer*	nr
(Italy) Matteo Berrettini*	15
(United Kingdom) Cameron Norrie*	8

Team World
Captain: (United States) John McEnroe
Player	Rank
(United States) Taylor Fritz	12
(Canada) Félix Auger-Aliassime	13
(Argentina) Diego Schwartzman	17
(United States) Frances Tiafoe	19
(Australia) Alex de Minaur	22
(United States) Jack Sock	128

- Singles rankings as of 19 September 2022
- nr = not ranked
- * = Federer and Nadal only played a doubles match on Day 1, and were replaced by alternates Berrettini and Norrie from Day 2.

=== 2023 ===
The sixth edition was held in Vancouver from 22 to 24 September 2023, at Rogers Arena. Team World defeated Team Europe 13−2.

Team Europe
Captain: (Sweden) Björn Borg
Player	Rank
Andrey Rublev	6
(Norway) Casper Ruud	9
(Poland) Hubert Hurkacz	16
(Spain) Alejandro Davidovich	25
(France) Arthur Fils	44
(France) Gaël Monfils	142

Team World
Captain: (United States) John McEnroe
Player	Rank
(United States) Taylor Fritz	8
(United States) Frances Tiafoe	11
(United States) Tommy Paul	13
(Canada) Félix Auger-Aliassime	14
(United States) Ben Shelton	19
(Argentina) Francisco Cerúndolo	21

- Singles rankings as of 18 September 2023

=== 2024 ===
The seventh edition was held in Berlin from 20 to 22 September 2024, at Uber Arena. Team Europe defeated Team World 13–11.

Team Europe
Captain: (Sweden) Björn Borg
Player	Rank
(Germany) Alexander Zverev	2
(Spain) Carlos Alcaraz	3
Daniil Medvedev	5
(Norway) Casper Ruud	9
(Bulgaria) Grigor Dimitrov	10
(Greece) Stefanos Tsitsipas	12

Team World
Captain: (United States) John McEnroe
Player	Rank
(United States) Taylor Fritz	7
(United States) Frances Tiafoe	16
(United States) Ben Shelton	17
(Chile) Alejandro Tabilo	22
(Argentina) Francisco Cerúndolo	31
(Australia) Thanasi Kokkinakis	78

- Singles rankings as of 16 September 2024

=== 2025 ===
The eighth edition was held in San Francisco from 19 to 21 September 2025, at Chase Center. Team World defeated Team Europe 15–9.

Team Europe
Captain: (France) Yannick Noah
Player	Rank
(Spain) Carlos Alcaraz	1
(Germany) Alexander Zverev	3
(Denmark) Holger Rune	11
(Norway) Casper Ruud	12
(Czech Republic) Jakub Menšík	17
(Italy) Flavio Cobolli	25

Team World
Captain: (United States) Andre Agassi
Player	Rank
(United States) Taylor Fritz	5
(Australia) Alex de Minaur	8
(Argentina) Francisco Cerúndolo	21
(United States) Alex Michelsen	32
(Brazil) João Fonseca	42
(United States) Reilly Opelka	62

- Singles rankings as of 15 September 2025

=== 2026 ===
2026 Laver Cup at the O2 Arena

The ninth edition was held in London from 25 to 27 September 2026, at the O2 Arena. Team Europe defeated Team World 13–5.

Team Europe
Captain: (France) Yannick Noah
Player	Rank
(Germany) Alexander Zverev	2
(Spain) Carlos Alcaraz	3
(Italy) Flavio Cobolli	7
(Spain) Rafael Jódar	14
(Czech Republic) Jakub Menšík	15
(Norway) Casper Ruud	17

Team World
Captain: (United States) Andre Agassi
Player	Rank
(Australia) Alex de Minaur	9
(United States) Taylor Fritz	10
(United States) Learner Tien	13
(United States) Brandon Nakashima	16
(Kazakhstan) Alexander Bublik	21
(Argentina) Francisco Cerúndolo	22

- Singles rankings as of 21 September 2026

=== 2027 ===
The tenth edition will be held in Los Angeles from 24 to 26 September 2027, at the Intuit Dome.

Team Europe
Captain: (France) Yannick Noah
Player	Rank
(Germany) Alexander Zverev	1
(Spain) Carlos Alcaraz	3

Team World
Captain: (United States) Andre Agassi
Player	Rank

- Singles rankings as of 9 November 2026

== Records and statistics ==
=== Tournament editions ===
Year	Winners	Score	Runners-up	Location	Venue
2017	Team Europe	15–9	Team World	Prague, Czech Republic	O2 Arena
2018	Team Europe	13–8	Team World	Chicago, United States	United Center
2019	Team Europe	13–11	Team World	Geneva, Switzerland	Palexpo
2020	No competition due to the COVID-19 pandemic				
2021	Team Europe	14–1	Team World	Boston, United States	TD Garden
2022	Team World	13–8	Team Europe	London, United Kingdom	The O2 Arena
2023	Team World	13–2	Team Europe	Vancouver, Canada	Rogers Arena
2024	Team Europe	13–11	Team World	Berlin, Germany	Uber Arena
2025	Team World	15–9	Team Europe	San Francisco, United States	Chase Center
2026	Team Europe	13–5	Team World	London, United Kingdom	The O2 Arena
2027				Los Angeles, United States	Intuit Dome

Laver Cups held in Europe	Laver Cups held in North America

=== Team statistics ===
Team	Matches (points) won												Laver Cups won
Team	Day 1 (1 point)			Day 2 (2 points)			Day 3 (3 points)			Total			Laver Cups won
Team	Sgl	Dbl	Total	Sgl	Dbl	Total	Sgl	Dbl	Total	Sgl	Dbl	Total	Laver Cups won
Team Europe	19 (19)	3 (3)	22 (22)	14 (28)	4 (8)	18 (36)	10 (30)	4 (12)	14 (42)	43 (77)	11 (23)	54 (100)	6
Team World	8 (8)	6 (6)	14 (14)	13 (26)	5 (10)	18 (36)	7 (21)	5 (15)	12 (36)	28 (55)	16 (31)	44 (86)	3

=== Captains statistics ===
Captain	Team	Nat	First year	Last year	Laver Cups	
Captain	Team	Nat	First year	Last year	App	Won
Björn Borg	Europe	(Sweden)	2017	2024	7	5
John McEnroe	World	(United States)	2017	2024	7	2
Andre Agassi	World	(United States)	2025	2026	2	1
Yannick Noah	Europe	(France)	2025	2026	2	1

=== Players ===
==== Records ====
Record		Record holder(s)
Most appearances	7	(Germany) Alexander Zverev
Most Laver Cups won	6	(Germany) Alexander Zverev
Most total matches played	19	(Germany) Alexander Zverev
Most singles matches won	8	(Germany) Alexander Zverev
Most doubles matches won	9	(United States) Jack Sock
Most total matches won	11	(Germany) Alexander Zverev
Best win percentage (minimum 8 matches)	80%	(Spain) Carlos Alcaraz
Most singles points won	20	(Germany) Alexander Zverev
Most doubles points won	19	(United States) Jack Sock
Most total points won	26	(Germany) Alexander Zverev
Most total points won in a tournament	8	(Spain) Carlos Alcaraz (2024)
Most total points won undefeated in a tournament	7	(Switzerland) Roger Federer (2017), (Australia) Alex de Minaur (2025)

==== Statistics ====
Players are sorted by points win–loss. Players who are no longer active are shown in italics.

Player	Team	Nat	First year	Last year	Laver Cups			Matches win–loss				Points win–loss		
Player	Team	Nat	First year	Last year	App	Won	MP	Sgl	Dbl	Total	W%	Sgl	Dbl	Total
Alexander Zverev	Europe	(Germany)	2017	2027	7	6	19	8–5	3–3	11–8	58%	20–11	6–5	26–16
Jack Sock	World	(United States)	2017	2022	4	1	16	1–3	9–3	10–6	63%	1–4	19–5	20–9
Roger Federer	Europe	(Switzerland)	2017	2022	4	3	12	6–0	2–4	8–4	67%	15–0	3–8	18–8
Carlos Alcaraz	Europe	(Spain)	2024	2027	3	2	10	4–1	4–1	8–2	80%	10–2	8–1	18–3
John Isner	World	(United States)	2017	2021	4	0	12	2–5	4–1	6–6	50%	5–11	10–2	15–13
Taylor Fritz	World	(United States)	2019	2026	6	3	13	6–3	1–3	7–6	54%	14–6	1–5	15–11
Casper Ruud	Europe	(Norway)	2021	2026	6	3	11	5–1	3–2	8–3	73%	6–1	8–4	14–5
Frances Tiafoe	World	(United States)	2017	2024	5	2	11	3–4	3–1	6–5	55%	7–7	5–3	12–10
Ben Shelton	World	(United States)	2023	2024	2	1	8	2–1	4–1	6–2	75%	4–2	8–3	12–5
Alex de Minaur	World	(Australia)	2022	2026	3	2	7	4–0	1–2	5–2	71%	8–0	2–5	10–5
Félix Auger-Aliassime	World	(Canada)	2021	2023	3	2	6	2–2	2–0	4–2	67%	4–3	5–0	9–3
Nick Kyrgios	World	(Australia)	2017	2021	4	0	9	1–4	3–1	4–5	44%	2–9	5–2	7–11
Stefanos Tsitsipas	Europe	(Greece)	2019	2024	4	3	9	4–1	1–3	5–4	56%	5–3	2–7	7–10
Rafael Nadal	Europe	(Spain)	2017	2022	3	2	7	2–1	1–3	3–4	43%	4–3	2–4	6–7
Andrey Rublev	Europe	(Russia)	2021	2023	2	1	6	1–1	2–2	3–3	50%	1–2	5–4	6–6
Jakub Menšík	Europe	(Czech Republic)	2025	2026	2	1	6	1–2	3–0	4–2	67%	1–4	5–0	6–4
Matteo Berrettini	Europe	(Italy)	2021	2022	2	1	5	2–0	1–2	3–2	60%	3–0	2–4	5–4
Novak Djokovic	Europe	(Serbia)	2018	2022	2	1	5	1–2	1–1	2–3	40%	2–5	2–1	4–6
Francisco Cerúndolo	World	(Argentina)	2023	2026	4	2	5	3–2	0–0	3–2	60%	4–4	0–0	4–4
Kevin Anderson	World	(South Africa)	2018	2018	1	0	3	1–1	1–0	2–1	67%	2–3	1–0	3–3
Flavio Cobolli	Europe	(Italy)	2025	2026	2	1	3	0–2	1–0	1–2	33%	0–3	3–0	3–3
Daniil Medvedev	Europe	(Russia)	2021	2024	2	2	3	1–2	0–0	1–2	33%	2–5	0–0	2–5
Alex Michelsen	World	(United States)	2025	2025	1	1	4	0–1	1–2	1–3	25%	0–1	2–4	2–5
Dominic Thiem	Europe	(Austria)	2017	2019	2	2	3	2–1	0–0	2–1	67%	2–3	0–0	2–3
Learner Tien	World	(United States)	2026	2026	1	0	2	1–1	0–0	1–1	50%	2–3	0–0	2–3
Grigor Dimitrov	Europe	(Bulgaria)	2018	2024	2	2	3	2–0	0–1	2–1	67%	2–0	0–2	2–2
Alejandro Tabilo	World	(Chile)	2024	2024	1	0	2	0–1	1–0	1–1	50%	0–1	2–0	2–1
Denis Shapovalov	World	(Canada)	2017	2021	3	0	6	0–3	1–2	1–5	17%	0–4	1–4	1–8
Marin Čilić	Europe	(Croatia)	2017	2017	1	1	2	1–0	0–1	1–1	50%	1–0	0–3	1–3
David Goffin	Europe	(Belgium)	2018	2018	1	1	2	1–0	0–1	1–1	50%	1–0	0–2	1–2
Brandon Nakashima	World	(United States)	2026	2026	1	0	2	1–0	0–1	1–1	50%	1–0	0–2	1–2
Tommy Paul	World	(United States)	2023	2023	1	1	2	0–1	1–0	1–1	50%	0–2	1–0	1–2
Kyle Edmund	Europe	(United Kingdom)	2018	2018	1	1	1	1–0	0–0	1–0	100%	1–0	0–0	1–0
João Fonseca	World	(Brazil)	2025	2025	1	1	1	1–0	0–0	1–0	100%	1–0	0–0	1–0
Rafael Jódar	Europe	(Spain)	2026	2026	1	1	1	1–0	0–0	1–0	100%	1–0	0–0	1–0
Reilly Opelka	World	(United States)	2021	2025	2	1	4	0–2	0–2	0–4	0%	0–2	0–6	0–8
Hubert Hurkacz	Europe	(Poland)	2023	2023	1	0	3	0–1	0–2	0–3	0%	0–2	0–5	0–7
Sam Querrey	World	(United States)	2017	2017	1	0	3	0–2	0–1	0–3	0%	0–5	0–2	0–7
Tomáš Berdych	Europe	(Czech Republic)	2017	2017	1	1	3	0–1	0–2	0–3	0%	0–2	0–4	0–6
Milos Raonic	World	(Canada)	2019	2019	1	0	2	0–2	0–0	0–2	0%	0–5	0–0	0–5
Alexander Bublik	World	(Kazakhstan)	2026	2026	1	0	3	0–1	0–2	0–3	0%	0–1	0–3	0–4
Andy Murray	Europe	(United Kingdom)	2022	2022	1	0	2	0–1	0–1	0–2	0%	0–1	0–3	0–4
Holger Rune	Europe	(Denmark)	2025	2025	1	0	2	0–1	0–1	0–2	0%	0–2	0–2	0–4
Gaël Monfils	Europe	(France)	2023	2023	1	0	2	0–1	0–1	0–2	0%	0–1	0–2	0–3
Diego Schwartzman	World	(Argentina)	2018	2022	3	1	3	0–3	0–0	0–3	0%	0–3	0–0	0–3
Arthur Fils	Europe	(France)	2023	2023	1	0	2	0–1	0–1	0–2	0%	0–1	0–1	0–2
Cameron Norrie	Europe	(United Kingdom)	2022	2022	1	0	1	0–1	0–0	0–1	0%	0–2	0–0	0–2
Alejandro Davidovich	Europe	(Spain)	2023	2023	1	0	1	0–1	0–0	0–1	0%	0–1	0–0	0–1
Fabio Fognini	Europe	(Italy)	2019	2019	1	1	1	0–1	0–0	0–1	0%	0–1	0–0	0–1
Thanasi Kokkinakis	World	(Australia)	2024	2024	1	0	1	0–1	0–0	0–1	0%	0–1	0–0	0–1

==== Participating nations ====
Nation	Team	Number of players											
Nation	Team	2017	2018	2019	2021	2022	2023	2024	2025	2026	2027	Total	Diff.
Argentina	World	–	1	–	1	1	1	1	1	1	–	7	2
Australia	World	1	1	1	1	1	–	1	1	1	–	8	3
Austria	Europe	1	–	1	–	–	–	–	–	–	–	2	1
Belgium	Europe	–	1	–	–	–	–	–	–	–	–	1	1
Brazil	World	–	–	–	–	–	–	–	1	–	–	1	1
Bulgaria	Europe	–	1	–	–	–	–	1	–	–	–	2	1
Canada	World	1	–	2	2	1	1	–	–	–	–	7	3
Chile	World	–	–	–	–	–	–	1	–	–	–	1	1
Croatia	Europe	1	–	–	–	–	–	–	–	–	–	1	1
Czech Republic	Europe	1	–	–	–	–	–	–	1	1	–	3	2
Denmark	Europe	–	–	–	–	–	–	–	1	–	–	1	1
France	Europe	–	–	–	–	–	2	–	–	–	–	2	2
Germany	Europe	1	1	1	1	–	–	1	1	1	1	8	1
Great Britain	Europe	–	1	–	–	2	–	–	–	–	–	3	3
Greece	Europe	–	–	1	1	1	–	1	–	–	–	4	1
Italy	Europe	–	–	1	1	1	–	–	1	1	–	5	3
Kazakhstan	World	–	–	–	–	–	–	–	–	1	–	1	1
Norway	Europe	–	–	–	1	1	1	1	1	1	–	6	1
Poland	Europe	–	–	–	–	–	1	–	–	–	–	1	1
Russia	Europe	–	–	–	2	–	1	1	–	–	–	4	2
Serbia	Europe	–	1	–	–	1	–	–	–	–	–	2	1
South Africa	World	–	1	–	–	–	–	–	–	–	–	1	1
Spain	Europe	1	–	1	–	1	1	1	1	2	1	9	4
Switzerland	Europe	1	1	1	–	1	–	–	–	–	–	4	1
United States	World	4	3	3	2	3	4	3	3	3	–	28	11
Total (25 nations)		12	12	12	12	14	12	12	12	12	2	112	50

== See also ==
- Davis Cup
- Billie Jean King Cup
- ATP Cup
- Hopman Cup
