= 2017 Laver Cup =

- Date: 22–24 September 2017
- Edition: 1st
- Surface: Hard indoor
- Location: Prague, Czech Republic
- Venue: O2 Arena (Prague)

Champions
- Team Europe; 15 – 9
- Laver Cup

The 2017 Laver Cup was the first edition of the Laver Cup, a men's tennis tournament between teams from Europe and the rest of the world. It was held on indoor hard courts at the O2 Arena in Prague, Czech Republic from 22 until 24 September.

Team Europe won the inaugural tournament 15–9.

== Player selection ==
On 24 August 2016, Roger Federer and Rafael Nadal were the first of six players to confirm their participation for Team Europe. On 15 May 2017, more than eight months later, Milos Raonic was the first of six players to confirm his participation for Team World. By 24 August 2017, all six players from each team had been chosen: Roger Federer, Rafael Nadal, Alexander Zverev, Marin Čilić, Dominic Thiem, and Tomáš Berdych for Team Europe, and Milos Raonic, John Isner, Jack Sock, Sam Querrey, Juan Martín del Potro, and Denis Shapovalov for Team World. Shortly afterwards Raonic withdrew and was replaced by Nick Kyrgios. Later Frances Tiafoe took the place of del Potro who had also withdrawn.

Former rivals Bjorn Borg (Europe) and John McEnroe (World) were serving as captains for the 2017 edition.

== Prize money ==
The total prize money for the 2017 Laver Cup was $2,250,000 for all 12 participating players.

Each winning team member earned $250,000 in the inaugural edition of the Laver Cup.

Whereas, each of the losing team members earned $125,000 each.

== Participants ==
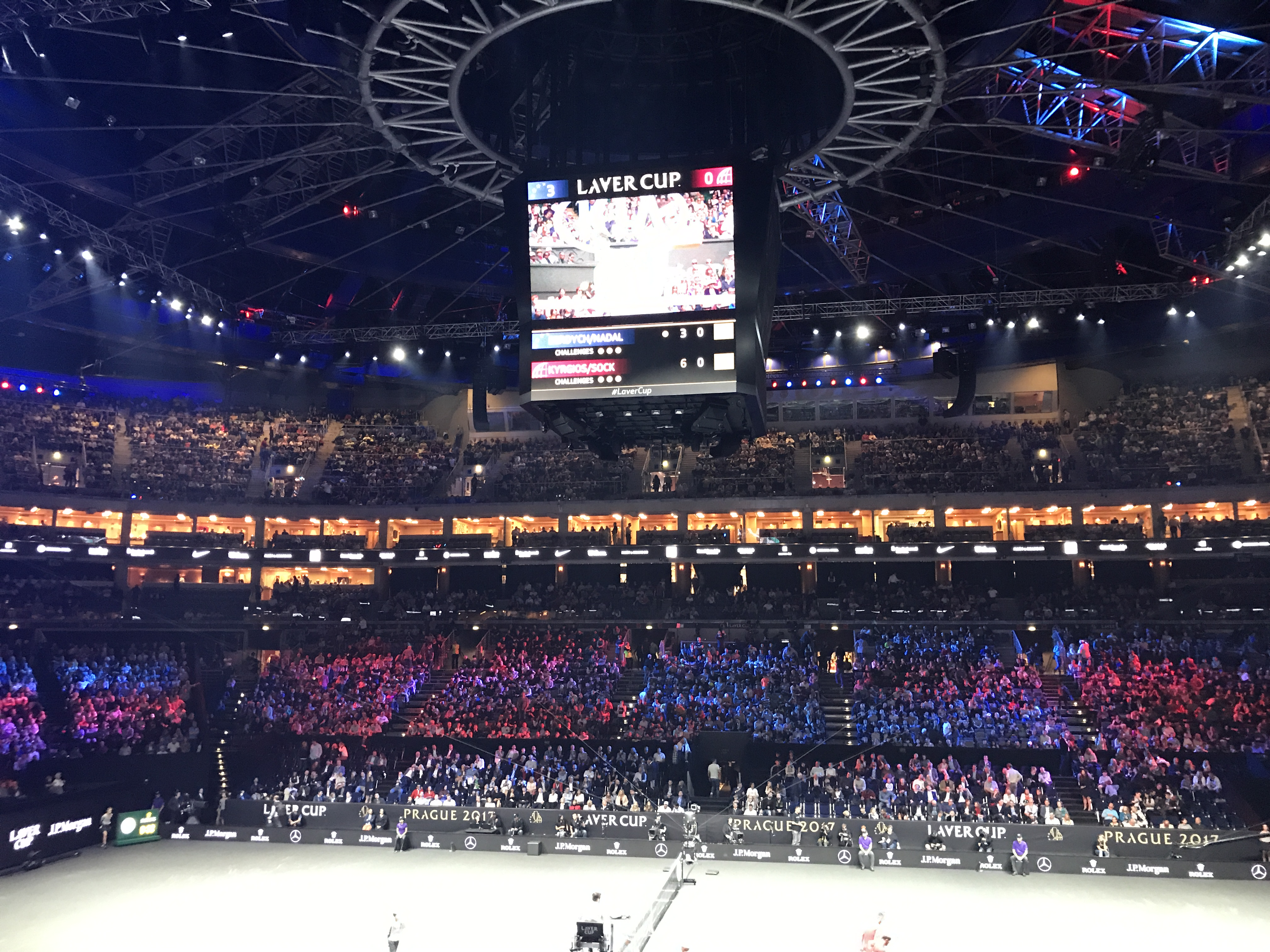
The O2 Arena in Prague during the first day of the event.

Team Europe
Captain: (Sweden) Björn Borg
Vice-captain: (Sweden) Thomas Enqvist
Player	Rank^{*}
(Spain) Rafael Nadal	1
(Switzerland) Roger Federer	2
(Germany) Alexander Zverev	4
(Croatia) Marin Čilić	5
(Austria) Dominic Thiem	7
(Czech Republic) Tomáš Berdych	19
(Spain) Fernando Verdasco	40

Team World
Captain: (United States) John McEnroe
Vice-captain: (United States) Patrick McEnroe
Player	Rank^{*}
(Canada) ~~Milos Raonic~~	11
(United States) Sam Querrey	16
(United States) John Isner	17
(Australia) Nick Kyrgios	20
(United States) Jack Sock	21
(Argentina) ~~Juan Martín del Potro~~	24
(Canada) Denis Shapovalov	51
(United States) Frances Tiafoe	72
(Australia) Thanasi Kokkinakis	81^{PR(215)}

Captain's pick
Withdrew
Replacement
Alternate

- Singles rankings as of 18 September 2017
- PR = Protected ranking

== Matches ==
Each match win on day 1 was worth one point, on day 2 two points, and on day 3 three points. The first team to 13 points won.

Day	Date	Match type	Team Europe	Team World	Score	Team points after match
1	22 Sep	Singles	(Croatia) Marin Čilić	(United States) Frances Tiafoe	7–6^{(7–3)}, 7–6^{(7–0)}	1–0
1	22 Sep	Singles	(Austria) Dominic Thiem	(United States) John Isner	6–7^{(15–17)}, 7–6^{(7–2)}, [10–7]	2–0
1	22 Sep	Singles	(Germany) Alexander Zverev	(Canada) Denis Shapovalov	7–6^{(7–3)}, 7–6^{(7–5)}	3–0
1	22 Sep	Doubles	(Czech Republic) T Berdych / (Spain) R Nadal	(Australia) N Kyrgios / (United States) J Sock	3–6, 7–6^{(9–7)}, [7–10]	3–1
2	23 Sep	Singles	(Switzerland) Roger Federer	(United States) Sam Querrey	6–4, 6–2	5–1
2	23 Sep	Singles	(Spain) Rafael Nadal	(United States) Jack Sock	6–3, 3–6, [11–9]	7–1
2	23 Sep	Singles	(Czech Republic) Tomáš Berdych	(Australia) Nick Kyrgios	6–4, 6–7^{(4–7)}, [6–10]	7–3
2	23 Sep	Doubles	(Switzerland) R Federer / (Spain) R Nadal	(United States) S Querrey / (United States) J Sock	6–4, 1–6, [10–5]	9–3
3	24 Sep	Doubles	(Czech Republic) T Berdych / (Croatia) M Čilić	(United States) J Isner / (United States) J Sock	6–7^{(5–7)}, 6–7^{(6–8)}	9–6
3	24 Sep	Singles	(Germany) Alexander Zverev	(United States) Sam Querrey	6–4, 6–4	12–6
3	24 Sep	Singles	(Spain) Rafael Nadal	(United States) John Isner	5–7, 6–7^{(1–7)}	12–9
3	24 Sep	Singles	(Switzerland) Roger Federer	(Australia) Nick Kyrgios	4–6, 7–6^{(8–6)}, [11–9]	15–9

== Player statistics ==
Player	Team	Nat.	Matches	Matches win–loss			Points win–loss		
Player	Team	Nat.	Matches	Singles	Doubles	Total	Singles	Doubles	Total
Tomáš Berdych	Europe	(Czech Republic)	3	0–1	0–2	0–3	0–2	0–4	0–6
Marin Čilić	Europe	(Croatia)	2	1–0	0–1	1–1	1–0	0–3	1–3
Roger Federer	Europe	(Switzerland)	3	2–0	1–0	3–0	5–0	2–0	7–0
John Isner	World	(United States)	3	1–1	1–0	2–1	3–1	3–0	6–1
Nick Kyrgios	World	(Australia)	3	1–1	1–0	2–1	2–3	1–0	3–3
Rafael Nadal	Europe	(Spain)	4	1–1	1–1	2–2	2–3	2–1	4–4
Sam Querrey	World	(United States)	3	0–2	0–1	0–3	0–5	0–2	0–7
Denis Shapovalov	World	(Canada)	1	0–1	0–0	0–1	0–1	0–0	0–1
Jack Sock	World	(United States)	4	0–1	2–1	2–2	0–2	4–2	4–4
Dominic Thiem	Europe	(Austria)	1	1–0	0–0	1–0	1–0	0–0	1–0
Frances Tiafoe	World	(United States)	1	0–1	0–0	0–1	0–1	0–0	0–1
Alexander Zverev	Europe	(Germany)	2	2–0	0–0	2–0	4–0	0–0	4–0
