= 2018 Laver Cup =

- Date: 21–23 September 2018
- Edition: 2nd
- Surface: Hard indoor
- Location: Chicago, United States
- Venue: United Center

Champions
- Team Europe; 13 – 8
- Laver Cup

The 2018 Laver Cup was the second edition of the Laver Cup, a men's tennis tournament between teams from Europe and the rest of the world. It was held on indoor hard courts at the United Center in Chicago, United States from 21 until 23 September.

Team Europe successfully defended their title, winning the tournament 13–8. The attendance was 93,584 over the three days.

== Player selection ==
On 19 March 2018, Roger Federer for Team Europe and Nick Kyrgios for Team World were the first players to confirm their participation.

On 28 June 2018, Novak Djokovic and Juan Martín del Potro committed to this event, as well as Kevin Anderson, John Isner and Diego Schwartzman on 26 July 2018.

On 13 August 2018, Alexander Zverev, Grigor Dimitrov and David Goffin announced their participation for Team Europe. As their final picks, the team captains Björn Borg and John McEnroe chose Kyle Edmund and Jack Sock, respectively. As in 2017, del Potro withdrew shortly before the tournament started and was replaced by Frances Tiafoe.

== Prize money ==
The total prize money for the 2018 Laver Cup was $2,250,000 for all 12 participating players.

Each winning team member earned $250,000, which marks no increase in prize money compared to 2017.

Whereas, each of the losing team members earned $125,000 each.

== Participants ==
Team Europe
Captain: (Sweden) Björn Borg
Vice-captain: (Sweden) Thomas Enqvist
Player	Rank
(Switzerland) Roger Federer	2
(Serbia) Novak Djokovic	3
(Germany) Alexander Zverev	5
(Bulgaria) Grigor Dimitrov	7
(Belgium) David Goffin	11
(United Kingdom) Kyle Edmund	16
(France) Jérémy Chardy	41

Team World
Captain: (United States) John McEnroe
Vice-captain: (United States) Patrick McEnroe
Player	Rank
(Argentina) ~~Juan Martín del Potro~~	4
(South Africa) Kevin Anderson	9
(United States) John Isner	10
(Argentina) Diego Schwartzman	14
(United States) Jack Sock	17
(Australia) Nick Kyrgios	27
(United States) Frances Tiafoe	40
(Chile) Nicolás Jarry	46

- Singles rankings as of 17 September 2018

Captain's pick
Withdrew
Replacement
Alternate

== Matches ==
Each match win on day 1 was worth one point, on day 2 two points, and on day 3 three points. The first team to 13 points won.

Day	Date	Match type	Team Europe	Team World	Score	Team points after match
1	21 Sep	Singles	(Bulgaria) Grigor Dimitrov	(United States) Frances Tiafoe	6–1, 6–4	1–0
1	21 Sep	Singles	(United Kingdom) Kyle Edmund	(United States) Jack Sock	6–4, 5–7, [10–6]	2–0
1	21 Sep	Singles	(Belgium) David Goffin	(Argentina) Diego Schwartzman	6–4, 4–6, [11–9]	3–0
1	21 Sep	Doubles	(Serbia) N Djokovic / (Switzerland) R Federer	(South Africa) K Anderson / (United States) J Sock	7–6^{(7–5)}, 3–6, [6–10]	3–1
2	22 Sep	Singles	(Germany) Alexander Zverev	(United States) John Isner	3–6, 7–6^{(8–6)}, [10–7]	5–1
2	22 Sep	Singles	(Switzerland) Roger Federer	(Australia) Nick Kyrgios	6–3, 6–2	7–1
2	22 Sep	Singles	(Serbia) Novak Djokovic	(South Africa) Kevin Anderson	6–7^{(5–7)}, 7–5, [6–10]	7–3
2	22 Sep	Doubles	(Bulgaria) G Dimitrov / (Belgium) D Goffin	(Australia) N Kyrgios / (United States) J Sock	3–6, 4–6	7–5
3	23 Sep	Doubles	(Switzerland) R Federer / (Germany) A Zverev	(United States) J Isner / (United States) J Sock	6–4, 6–7^{(2–7)}, [9–11]	7–8
3	23 Sep	Singles	(Switzerland) Roger Federer	(United States) John Isner	6–7^{(5–7)}, 7–6^{(8–6)}, [10–7]	10–8
3	23 Sep	Singles	(Germany) Alexander Zverev	(South Africa) Kevin Anderson	6–7^{(3–7)}, 7–5, [10–7]	13–8
3	23 Sep	Singles	(Serbia) Novak Djokovic	(Australia) Nick Kyrgios	not played	

== Player statistics ==
Player	Team	Nat.	Matches	Matches win–loss			Points win–loss		
Player	Team	Nat.	Matches	Singles	Doubles	Total	Singles	Doubles	Total
Kevin Anderson	World	(South Africa)	3	1–1	1–0	2–1	2–3	1–0	3–3
Grigor Dimitrov	Europe	(Bulgaria)	2	1–0	0–1	1–1	1–0	0–2	1–2
Novak Djokovic	Europe	(Serbia)	2	0–1	0–1	0–2	0–2	0–1	0–3
Kyle Edmund	Europe	(United Kingdom)	1	1–0	0–0	1–0	1–0	0–0	1–0
Roger Federer	Europe	(Switzerland)	4	2–0	0–2	2–2	5–0	0–4	5–4
David Goffin	Europe	(Belgium)	2	1–0	0–1	1–1	1–0	0–2	1–2
John Isner	World	(United States)	3	0–2	1–0	1–2	0–5	3–0	3–5
Nick Kyrgios	World	(Australia)	2	0–1	1–0	1–1	0–2	2–0	2–2
Diego Schwartzman	World	(Argentina)	1	0–1	0–0	0–1	0–1	0–0	0–1
Jack Sock	World	(United States)	4	0–1	3–0	3–1	0–1	6–0	6–1
Frances Tiafoe	World	(United States)	1	0–1	0–0	0–1	0–1	0–0	0–1
Alexander Zverev	Europe	(Germany)	3	2–0	0–1	2–1	5–0	0–3	5–3
