= Casper Ruud career statistics =

Norwegian tennis player

Career finals
Discipline	Type	Won	Lost	Total
Singles
Singles	Grand Slam	0	3	3
Singles	ATP Finals	0	1	1
Singles	ATP 1000	1	3	4
Singles	ATP 500	1	2	3
Singles	ATP 250	12	4	16
Singles	Olympics	–	–	–
Singles	Total	14	13	27
Doubles
Doubles	Grand Slam	–	–	–
Doubles	ATP Finals	–	–	–
Doubles	ATP 1000	–	–	–
Doubles	ATP 500	–	–	–
Doubles	ATP 250	–	–	–
Doubles	Olympics	–	–	–
Doubles	Total	0	0	0

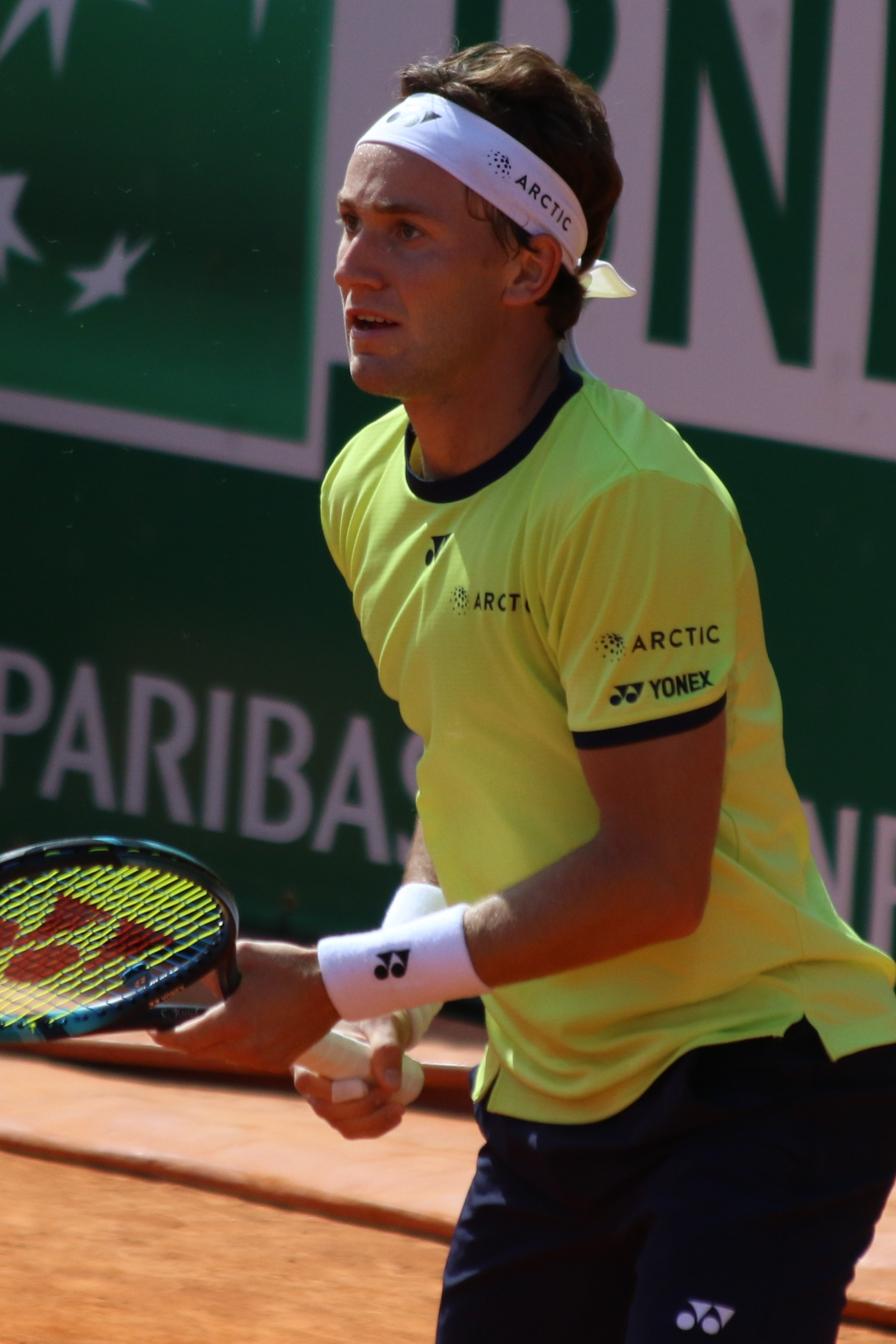
Ruud in 2022 at the Monte-Carlo Masters.

This is a list of the main career statistics of Norwegian professional tennis player Casper Ruud. All statistics are per the ATP Tour and ITF websites.

== Performance timelines ==
Key
W	F	SF	QF	#R	RR	Q#	P#	DNQ	A	Z#	PO	G	S	B	NMS	NTI	P	NH

(W) winner; (F) finalist; (SF) semifinalist; (QF) quarterfinalist; (#R) rounds 4, 3, 2, 1; (RR) round-robin stage; (Q#) qualification round; (P#) preliminary round; (DNQ) did not qualify; (A) absent; (Z#) Davis/Fed Cup Zonal Group (with number indication) or (PO) play-off; (G) gold, (S) silver or (B) bronze Olympic/Paralympic medal; (NMS) not a Masters tournament; (NTI) not a Tier I tournament; (P) postponed; (NH) not held; (SR) strike rate (events won / competed); (W–L) win–loss record.
To avoid confusion and double counting, these charts are updated at the conclusion of a tournament or when the player's participation has ended.

=== Singles ===
Current through the 2026 Shanghai Masters.

Tournament	2016	2017	2018	2019	2020	2021	2022	2023	2024	2025	2026	SR	W–L	Win %
Grand Slam tournaments
Australian Open	A	Q3	2R	Q1	1R	4R	A	2R	3R	2R	4R	0 / 7	11–7	61%
French Open	A	Q2	2R	3R	3R	3R	F	F	SF (Note: Ruud's quarterfinal opponent, Novak Djokovic, withdrew before the quarterfinals of the 2024 French Open, which does not officially count as a win.)	2R	4R	0 / 9	27–9	75%
Wimbledon	A	A	Q1	1R	NH	1R	2R	2R	2R	A	1R	0 / 6	3–6	33%
US Open	A	Q2	1R	1R	3R	2R	F	2R	4R	2R	A	0 / 8	14–8	64%
Win–Loss	0–0	0–0	2–3	2–3	4–3	6–4	13–3	9–4	10–4	3–3	6–3	0 / 30	55–30	65%
Year-end championships
ATP Finals	did not qualify					SF	F	DNQ	SF	Alt		0 / 3	7–6	54%
National representation
Summer Olympics	A	not held				A	not held		QF	not held		0 / 1	3–1	75%
Davis Cup	Z2	Z2	Z2	Z2	W1	W1	W1	W1	W1	W1		0 / 0	19–5	79%
ATP 1000 tournaments
Indian Wells Open	A	A	Q2	Q1	NH	4R	3R	3R	QF	2R	4R	0 / 6	9–6	60%
Miami Open	Q1	1R	Q1	1R	NH	A	F	3R	4R	4R	2R	0 / 7	10–7	59%
Monte-Carlo Masters	A	1R	A	A	NH	SF	3R	3R	F	3R	3R	0 / 7	13–7	65%
Madrid Open	A	Q1	A	Q2	NH	SF	2R	2R	4R	W	QF	1 / 6	15–5	75%
Italian Open	A	A	A	3R	SF	A	SF	SF	2R	QF	F	0 / 7	21–7	75%
Canadian Open	A	A	A	A	NH	QF	SF	3R	3R	4R	3R	0 / 6	10–5	67%
Cincinnati Open	A	A	A	1R	1R	QF	2R	2R	2R	2R	2R	0 / 8	2–8	20%
Shanghai Masters	A	A	A	A	not held			4R	2R	2R	QF	0 / 4	5-4	56%
Paris Masters	A	A	A	1R	1R	QF	3R	2R	2R	2R		0 / 7	3–7	30%
Win–Loss	0–0	0–2	0–0	2–4	4–3	16–6	14–8	10–9	12–8	14–8	16–8	1 / 58	88–56	61%
Career statistics
	2016	2017	2018	2019	2020	2021	2022	2023	2024	2025	2026	Career		
Tournaments	1	8	9	17	13	22	22	23	25	19	15	Career total: 174		
Titles	0	0	0	0	1	5	3	1	2	2	0	Career total: 14		
Finals	0	0	0	1	2	5	7	3	5	3	1	Career total: 27		
Hard Win–Loss	2–3	2–4	3–3	4–10	5–7	27–10	25–13	14–14	26–17	28–12	8–9	2 / 92	144–102	59%
Clay Win–Loss	0–0	5–5	5–6	19–8	17–6	28–5	25–7	22–8	24–7	14–5	17–6	12 / 74	176–63	74%
Grass Win–Loss	0–0	0–0	0–0	0–1	0–0	2–2	1–2	1–1	1–1	0–0	0–1	0 / 8	5–8	38%
Overall Win–Loss	2–3	7–9	8–9	23–19	22–13	57–17	51–22	37–23	51–25	39–16	28–17	14 / 175	325–173	65%
Win %	40%	44%	47%	55%	63%	77%	70%	62%	67%	71%	62%	Career total: 65%		
Year-end ranking	225	139	112	54	27	8	3	11	6	12		$30,815,387		

=== Doubles ===
Tournament	2015	2016	2017	2018	2019	2020	2021	2022	2023	2024	2025	2026	SR	W–L	Win %
Grand Slam tournaments
Australian Open	A	A	A	A	A	1R	2R	A	A	A	A	A	0 / 2	1–2	33%
French Open	A	A	A	A	2R	1R	1R	A	A	A	A	A	0 / 3	1–3	25%
Wimbledon	A	A	A	A	1R	NH	QF	2R	2R	1R	A	A	0 / 5	5–4	56%
US Open	A	A	A	A	3R	A	1R	A	A	1R	A	A	0 / 3	2–3	40%
Win–loss	0–0	0–0	0–0	0–0	3–3	0–2	4–4	1–1	1–0	0–2	0–0	0–0	0 / 13	9–12	43%
National representation
Summer Olympics	NH	A	not held				A	not held		A	not held		0 / 0	0–0	–
Davis Cup	Z3	Z2	Z2	Z2	Z2	W1	W1	W1	W1	W1	W1		0 / 0	7–6	54%
ATP 1000 tournaments
Indian Wells Open	A	A	A	A	A	NH	A	A	1R	A	A	A	0 / 1	0–1	0%
Miami Open	A	A	A	A	A	NH	A	A	A	1R	A	A	0 / 1	0–1	0%
Monte-Carlo Masters	A	A	A	A	A	NH	A	A	A	A	A	1R	0 / 1	0–1	0%
Madrid Open	A	A	A	A	A	NH	1R	A	A	A	A	A	0 / 1	0–1	0%
Italian Open	A	A	A	A	A	A	A	A	A	A	A	A	0 / 0	0–0	–
Canadian Open	A	A	A	A	A	NH	1R	A	A	2R	1R	2R	0 / 4	2–4	33%
Cincinnati Open	A	A	A	A	A	1R	A	A	A	A	1R	A	0 / 2	0–2	0%
Shanghai Masters	A	A	A	A	A	not held			A	A	A	A	0 / 0	0–0	–
Paris Masters	A	A	A	A	A	2R	A	A	A	A	A		0 / 1	1–1	50%
Win–loss	0–0	0–0	0–0	0–0	0–0	1–2	0–2	0–0	0–1	1–2	0–2	1–2	0 / 11	3–11	21%
Career statistics
	2015	2016	2017	2018	2019	2020	2021	2022	2023	2024	2025	2026	Career		
Tournaments	0	1	0	1	4	5	7	1	3	7	3	2	Career total: 34		
Hard Win–Loss	0–0	0–3	1–1	1–0	2–2	3–5	1–5	1–1	1–2	6–6	1–5	1–1	0 / 20	18–31	37%
Clay Win–Loss	0–0	0–0	0–0	1–1	2–1	1–2	0–2	0–0	0–0	2–0	0–0	0–1	0 / 8	6–7	46%
Grass Win–Loss	0–0	0–0	0–0	0–0	0–1	0–0	3–2	1–1	1–0	0–1	0–0	0–0	0 / 6	5–5	50%
Overall Win–Loss	0–0	0–3	1–1	2–1	4–4	4–7	4–9	2–2	2–2	8–7	1–5	1–2	0 / 34	29–43	40%
Year-end ranking	–	944	1168	509	227	188	177	–	582	418	876				

== Grand Slam tournament finals ==
=== Singles: 3 (3 runners-up) ===
Result	Year	Tournament	Surface	Opponent	Score
Loss	2022	French Open	Clay	(Spain) Rafael Nadal	3–6, 3–6, 0–6
Loss	2022	US Open	Hard	(Spain) Carlos Alcaraz	4–6, 6–2, 6–7^{(1–7)}, 3–6
Loss	2023	French Open	Clay	(Serbia) Novak Djokovic	6–7^{(3–7)}, 3–6, 5–7

=== Mixed doubles: 1 (runner-up) ===
Result	Year	Tournament	Surface	Partner	Opponents	Score
Loss	2025	US Open	Hard	(Poland) Iga Świątek	(Italy) Sara Errani (Italy) Andrea Vavassori	3–6, 7–5, [6–10]

== Other significant finals ==
=== Year-end championships (ATP Finals) ===
==== Singles: 1 (runner-up) ====
Result	Year	Tournament	Surface	Opponent	Score
Loss	2022	Finals, Turin, Italy	Hard (i)	(Serbia) Novak Djokovic	5–7, 3–6

=== ATP 1000 tournaments ===
==== Singles: 4 (1 title, 3 runners-up) ====
Result	Year	Tournament	Surface	Opponent	Score
Loss	2022	Miami Open	Hard	(Spain) Carlos Alcaraz	5–7, 4–6
Loss	2024	Monte-Carlo Masters	Clay	(Greece) Stefanos Tsitsipas	1–6, 4–6
Win	2025	Madrid Open	Clay	(United Kingdom) Jack Draper	7–5, 3–6, 6–4
Loss	2026	Italian Open	Clay	(Italy) Jannik Sinner	4–6, 4–6

== ATP Tour finals ==
=== Singles: 27 (14 titles, 13 runners-up) ===
Legend Grand Slam (0–3) ATP Finals (0–1) ATP 1000 (1–3) ATP 500 (1–2) ATP 250 (12–4)	Finals by surface Hard (2–6) Clay (12–7) Grass (0–0)	Finals by setting Outdoor (13–11) Indoor (1–2)

Result	W–L	Date	Tournament	Tier	Surface	Opponent	Score
Loss	0–1	Apr 2019	U.S. Men's Clay Championships, US	ATP 250	Clay	(Chile) Cristian Garín	6–7^{(4–7)}, 6–4, 3–6
Win	1–1	Feb 2020	Argentina Open, Argentina	ATP 250	Clay	(Portugal) Pedro Sousa	6–1, 6–4
Loss	1–2	Mar 2020	Chile Open, Chile	ATP 250	Clay	(Brazil) Thiago Seyboth Wild	5–7, 6–4, 3–6
Win	2–2	May 2021	Geneva Open, Switzerland	ATP 250	Clay	(Canada) Denis Shapovalov	7–6^{(8–6)}, 6–4
Win	3–2	Jul 2021	Swedish Open, Sweden	ATP 250	Clay	(Argentina) Federico Coria	6–3, 6–3
Win	4–2	Jul 2021	Swiss Open, Switzerland	ATP 250	Clay	(France) Hugo Gaston	6–3, 6–2
Win	5–2	Jul 2021	Austrian Open Kitzbühel, Austria	ATP 250	Clay	(Spain) Pedro Martínez	6–1, 4–6, 6–3
Win	6–2	Oct 2021	San Diego Open, US	ATP 250	Hard	(United Kingdom) Cameron Norrie	6–0, 6–2
Win	7–2	Feb 2022	Argentina Open, Argentina (2)	ATP 250	Clay	(Argentina) Diego Schwartzman	5–7, 6–2, 6–3
Loss	7–3	Apr 2022	Miami Open, US	ATP 1000	Hard	(Spain) Carlos Alcaraz	5–7, 4–6
Win	8–3	May 2022	Geneva Open, Switzerland (2)	ATP 250	Clay	(Portugal) João Sousa	7–6^{(7–3)}, 4–6, 7–6^{(7–1)}
Loss	8–4	Jun 2022	French Open, France	Grand Slam	Clay	(Spain) Rafael Nadal	3–6, 3–6, 0–6
Win	9–4	Jul 2022	Swiss Open, Switzerland (2)	ATP 250	Clay	(Italy) Matteo Berrettini	4–6, 7–6^{(7–4)}, 6–2
Loss	9–5	Sep 2022	US Open, US	Grand Slam	Hard	(Spain) Carlos Alcaraz	4–6, 6–2, 6–7^{(1–7)}, 3–6
Loss	9–6	Nov 2022	ATP Finals, Italy	Finals	Hard (i)	(Serbia) Novak Djokovic	5–7, 3–6
Win	10–6	Apr 2023	Estoril Open, Portugal	ATP 250	Clay	(Serbia) Miomir Kecmanović	6–2, 7–6^{(7–3)}
Loss	10–7	Jun 2023	French Open, France	Grand Slam	Clay	(Serbia) Novak Djokovic	6–7^{(1–7)}, 3–6, 5–7
Loss	10–8	Jul 2023	Swedish Open, Sweden	ATP 250	Clay	Andrey Rublev	6–7^{(3–7)}, 0–6
Loss	10–9	Feb 2024	Los Cabos Open, Mexico	ATP 250	Hard	(Australia) Jordan Thompson	3–6, 6–7^{(4–7)}
Loss	10–10	Mar 2024	Mexican Open, Mexico	ATP 500	Hard	(Australia) Alex de Minaur	4–6, 4–6
Loss	10–11	Apr 2024	Monte-Carlo Masters, France	ATP 1000	Clay	(Greece) Stefanos Tsitsipas	1–6, 4–6
Win	11–11	Apr 2024	Barcelona Open, Spain	ATP 500	Clay	(Greece) Stefanos Tsitsipas	7–5, 6–3
Win	12–11	May 2024	Geneva Open, Switzerland (3)	ATP 250	Clay	(Czech Republic) Tomáš Macháč	7–5, 6–3
Loss	12–12	Feb 2025	Dallas Open, US	ATP 500	Hard (i)	(Canada) Denis Shapovalov	6–7^{(5–7)}, 3–6
Win	13–12	May 2025	Madrid Open, Spain	ATP 1000	Clay	(United Kingdom) Jack Draper	7–5, 3–6, 6–4
Win	14–12	Oct 2025	Stockholm Open, Sweden	ATP 250	Hard (i)	(France) Ugo Humbert	6–2, 6–3
Loss	14–13	May 2026	Italian Open, Italy	ATP 1000	Clay	(Italy) Jannik Sinner	4–6, 4–6

== ATP Challenger and ITF Tour finals ==
=== Singles: 9 (3 titles, 6 runner-ups) ===
Legend ATP Challenger Tour (1–2) ITF Futures (2–4)	Finals by surface Hard (0–2) Clay (3–4)

Result	W–L	Date	Tournament	Surface	Opponent	Score
Win	1–0	Sep 2016	Copa Sevilla Open, Spain	Clay	(Japan) Taro Daniel	6–3, 6–4
Loss	1–1	Apr 2018	Internazionali di Tennis d'Abruzzo, Italy	Clay	(Italy) Gianluigi Quinzi	4–6, 1–6
Loss	1–2	Apr 2018	Braga Open, Portugal	Clay	(Portugal) Pedro Sousa	0–6, 6–3, 3–6
Win	1–0	Feb 2016	F3 Paguera, Spain	Clay	(Spain) Carlos Taberner	2–6, 7–6^{(13–11)}, 6–0
Loss	1–1	Mar 2016	F10 Bakersfield, US	Hard	(United States) Michael Mmoh	4–6, 7–6^{(7–5)}, 1–6
Loss	1–2	May 2016	F10 Santa Margherita di Pula, Italy	Clay	(Greece) Stefanos Tsitsipas	3–6, 7–6^{(7–2)}, 6–7^{(2–7)}
Loss	1–3	Jul 2016	F6 Knokke, Belgium	Clay	(Germany) Daniel Altmaier	7–6^{(7–3)}, 1–6, 6–7^{(3–7)}
Win	2–3	Aug 2016	F1 Kaarina, Finland	Clay	(Denmark) Mikael Torpegaard	6–3, 4–6, 6–0
Loss	2–4	Nov 2016	F3 Oslo, Norway	Hard	(Italy) Gianluigi Quinzi	4–6, 2–6

== Wins over top 10 players ==
- Ruud has a 23–34 record against players who were, at the time the match was played, ranked in the top 10.

Season	2020	2021	2022	2023	2024	2025	2026	Total
Wins	1	3	5	1	6	3	4	23

#	Player	Rk	Event	Surface	Rd	Score	Rk	Ref
2020
1.	(Italy) Matteo Berrettini	8	Italian Open, Italy	Clay	QF	4–6, 6–3, 7–6^{(7–5)}	34	
2021
2.	(Argentina) Diego Schwartzman	9	Monte-Carlo Masters, France	Clay	2R	6–3, 6–3	27	
3.	(Greece) Stefanos Tsitsipas	5	Madrid Open, Spain	Clay	3R	7–6^{(7–4)}, 6–4	22	
4.	(Russia) Andrey Rublev	5	ATP Finals, Italy	Hard (i)	RR	2–6, 7–5, 7–6^{(7–5)}	8	
2022
5.	(Germany) Alexander Zverev	4	Miami Open, United States	Hard	QF	6–3, 1–6, 6–3	8	
6.	(Canada) Félix Auger-Aliassime	9	Canadian Open, Canada	Hard	QF	6–1, 6–2	7	
7.	(Canada) Félix Auger-Aliassime	6	ATP Finals, Italy	Hard (i)	RR	7–6^{(7–4)}, 6–4	4	
8.	(United States) Taylor Fritz	9	ATP Finals, Italy	Hard (i)	RR	6–3, 4–6, 7–6^{(8–6)}	4	
9.	Andrey Rublev	7	ATP Finals, Italy	Hard (i)	SF	6–2, 6–4	4	
2023
10.	(Denmark) Holger Rune	6	French Open, France	Clay	QF	6–1, 6–2, 3–6, 6–3	4	
2024
11.	(Denmark) Holger Rune	7	Mexican Open, Mexico	Hard	SF	3–6, 6–3, 6–4	11	
12.	(Poland) Hubert Hurkacz	8	Monte-Carlo Masters, France	Clay	3R	6–4, 6–2	10	
13.	(Serbia) Novak Djokovic	1	Monte-Carlo Masters, France	Clay	SF	6–4, 1–6, 6–4	10	
14.	(Greece) Stefanos Tsitsipas	7	Barcelona Open, Spain	Clay	F	7–5, 6–3	6	
15.	(Spain) Carlos Alcaraz	3	ATP Finals, Italy	Hard (i)	RR	6–1, 7–5	7	
16.	Andrey Rublev	8	ATP Finals, Italy	Hard (i)	RR	6–4, 5–7, 6–2	7	
2025
17.	(United States) Taylor Fritz	4	Madrid Open, Spain	Clay	4R	7–5, 6–4	15	
18.	Daniil Medvedev	10	Madrid Open, Spain	Clay	QF	6–3, 7–5	15	
19.	(United Kingdom) Jack Draper	6	Madrid Open, Spain	Clay	F	7–5, 3–6, 6–4	15	
2026
20.	(Australia) Alex de Minaur	7	United Cup, Australia	Hard	RR	6–3, 6–3	12	
21.	(Italy) Lorenzo Musetti	10	Italian Open, Italy	Clay	4R	6–3, 6–1	25	
22.	(Canada) Félix Auger-Aliassime	5	Shanghai Masters, China	Hard	4R	5–2 ret.	20	
23.	(Spain) Rafael Jódar	10	Paris Masters, France	Hard (i)	2R	6–3, 6–4	23	

- Key: (Rk) first use, opponent rank; (Rd) round; (Rk) 2nd use, player rank; (Ref) reference; (F) final; (SF) semifinal; (QF) quarterfinal; (#R) rounds 4, 3, 2, 1; (RR) round-robin stage; (Q#) qualifying rounds or stages (3), 2, 1.

* Statistics correct as of 3 November 2026.

== Career Grand Slam statistics ==
=== Career Grand Slam seedings ===
The tournaments won by Ruud are in boldface, and advanced into finals by Ruud are in italics.
Unseeded or seeded 32–11
Seeded 10–4
Seeded no. 3
Seeded no. 2
Seeded no. 1

Year	Australian Open	French Open	Wimbledon	US Open
2017	Did not qualify	Did not qualify	Did not play	Did not qualify
2018	Qualifier	Qualifier	Did not qualify	Qualifier
2019	Did not qualify	Unseeded	Unseeded	Unseeded
2020	Unseeded	28th	tournament cancelled (Note: Due to the COVID-19 pandemic, the 2020 edition of the Wimbledon Championships was cancelled.)	30th
2021	24th	15th	12th	8th
2022	8th (Note: Ruud was seeded eighth but withdrew from the tournament before play started due to an ankle injury.)	8th (1)	3rd	5th (2)
2023	2nd	4th (3)	4th	5th
2024	11th	7th	8th	8th
2025	6th	7th	Did not play	12th
2026	12th	15th	11th	

=== Best Grand Slam results details ===
Grand Slam winners are in boldface, and runner-ups are in italics (at time of matches played).

Australian Open
2021 Australian Open (24th seed)
Round	Opponent	Rank	Score
1R	(Australia) Jordan Thompson	49	6–3, 6–3, 2–1 ret.
2R	(United States) Tommy Paul	53	3–6, 6–2, 6–4, 7–5
3R	(Moldova) Radu Albot	85	6–1, 5–7, 6–4, 6–4
4R	(Russia) Andrey Rublev (7)	8	2–6, 6–7^{(3–7)}, 0–0 ret.
2026 Australian Open (12th seed)
Round	Opponent	Rank	Score
1R	(Italy) Mattia Bellucci	76	6–1, 6–2, 6–4
2R	(Spain) Jaume Munar	39	6–3, 7–5, 6–4
3R	(Croatia) Marin Čilić	70	6–4, 6–4, 3–6, 7–5
4R	(United States) Ben Shelton (8)	7	6–3, 4–6, 3–6, 4–6

French Open
2022 French Open (8th seed)
Round	Opponent	Rank	Score
1R	(France) Jo-Wilfried Tsonga	296	6–7^{(6–8)}, 7–6^{(7–4)}, 6–2, 7–6^{(7–0)}
2R	(Finland) Emil Ruusuvuori	61	6–3, 6–4, 6–2
3R	(Italy) Lorenzo Sonego (32)	35	6–2, 6–7^{(3–7)}, 1–6, 6–4, 6–3
4R	(Poland) Hubert Hurkacz (12)	13	6–2, 6–3, 3–6, 6–3
QF	(Denmark) Holger Rune	40	6–1, 4–6, 7–6^{(7–2)}, 6–3
SF	(Croatia) Marin Čilić (20)	23	3–6, 6–4, 6–2, 6–2
F	(Spain) **Rafael Nadal** (5)	5	3–6, 3–6, 0–6
2023 French Open (4th seed)
Round	Opponent	Rank	Score
1R	(Sweden) Elias Ymer	155	6–4, 6–3, 6–2
2R	(Italy) Giulio Zeppieri	129	6–3, 6–2, 4–6, 7–5
3R	(China) Zhang Zhizhen	71	4–6, 6–4, 6–1, 6–4
4R	(Chile) Nicolás Jarry	35	7–6^{(7–3)}, 7–5, 7–5
QF	(Denmark) Holger Rune (6)	6	6–1, 6–2, 3–6, 6–3
SF	(Germany) Alexander Zverev (22)	27	6–3, 6–4, 6–0
F	(Serbia) **Novak Djokovic** (3)	3	6–7^{(1–7)}, 3–6, 5–7

Wimbledon Championships
2022 Wimbledon Championships (3rd seed)
Round	Opponent	Rank	Score
1R	(Spain) Albert Ramos Viñolas	39	7–6^{(7–1)}, 7–6^{(11–9)}, 6–2
2R	(France) Ugo Humbert	112	6–3, 2–6, 5–7, 4–6
2023 Wimbledon Championships (4th seed)
Round	Opponent	Rank	Score
1R	(France) Laurent Lokoli (Q)	199	6–1, 5–7, 6–4, 6–3
2R	(United Kingdom) Liam Broady (WC)	142	4–6, 6–3, 6–4, 3–6, 0–6
2024 Wimbledon Championships (8th seed)
Round	Opponent	Rank	Score
1R	(Australia) Alex Bolt (Q)	234	7–6^{(7–2)}, 6–4, 6–4
2R	(Italy) Fabio Fognini	94	4–6, 5–7, 7–6^{(7–1)}, 3–6

US Open
2022 US Open (5th seed)
Round	Opponent	Rank	Score
1R	(United Kingdom) Kyle Edmund	601	6–3, 7–5, 6–2
2R	(Netherlands) Tim van Rijthoven	117	6–7^{(4–7)}, 6–4, 6–4, 6–4
3R	(United States) Tommy Paul (29)	34	7–6^{(7–3)}, 6–7^{(5–7)}, 7–6^{(7–2)}, 5–7, 6–0
4R	(France) Corentin Moutet (LL)	112	6–1, 6–2, 6–7^{(4–7)}, 6–2
QF	(Italy) Matteo Berrettini (13)	14	6–1, 6–4, 7–6^{(7–4)}
SF	Karen Khachanov (27)	31	7–6^{(7–5)}, 6–2, 5–7, 6–2
F	(Spain) **Carlos Alcaraz** (3)	4	4–6, 6–2, 6–7^{(1–7)}, 3–6

== National and international participation ==
=== Team competitions finals: 5 (2 title, 3 runners-up) ===
Finals by tournaments Laver Cup (2–3)	Finals by teams Europe (2–3)

Result	Year	Tournament	Team	Partner(s)	Opponent team	Opponent players	Surface	Score
Win	2021	Laver Cup	Team Europe	Daniil Medvedev; Stefanos Tsitsipas; Alexander Zverev; Andrey Rublev; Matteo Berrettini	Team World	Félix Auger-Aliassime; Denis Shapovalov; Diego Schwartzman; Reilly Opelka; John Isner; Nick Kyrgios	Hard (i)	14–1
Loss	2022	Laver Cup	Team Europe	Rafael Nadal; Stefanos Tsitsipas; Novak Djokovic; Roger Federer; Andy Murray; Matteo Berrettini; Cameron Norrie	Team World	Taylor Fritz; Félix Auger-Aliassime; Diego Schwartzman; Frances Tiafoe; Alex de Minaur; Jack Sock	Hard (i)	8–13
Loss	2023	Laver Cup	Team Europe	Andrey Rublev; Hubert Hurkacz; Alejandro Davidovich Fokina; Gaël Monfils; Arthur Fils	Team World	Taylor Fritz; Frances Tiafoe; Tommy Paul; Félix Auger-Aliassime; Ben Shelton; Francisco Cerúndolo	Hard (i)	2–13
Win	2024	Laver Cup	Team Europe	Carlos Alcaraz; Alexander Zverev; Daniil Medvedev; Stefanos Tsitsipas; Grigor Dimitrov	Team World	Taylor Fritz; Frances Tiafoe; Ben Shelton; Alejandro Tabilo; Francisco Cerúndolo; Thanasi Kokkinakis	Hard (i)	13–11
Loss	2025	Laver Cup	Team Europe	Carlos Alcaraz; Alexander Zverev; Holger Rune; Jakub Menšík; Flavio Cobolli	Team World	Taylor Fritz; Alex de Minaur; Francisco Cerúndolo; Alex Michelsen; João Fonseca; Reilly Opelka	Hard (i)	9–15

=== Davis Cup (23–9) ===
Group membership World Group/ Finals (0–0) WG play-off/qualifiers (1–1) Group I (6–2) Group II (13–6) Group III (3–0) Group IV (0)	Matches by Surface Hard (17–9) Clay (6–0) Grass (0–0) Carpet (0–0)	Matches by Type Singles (18–4) Doubles (5–5)	Matches by Setting Indoors (16–7) Outdoors (7–2)	Matches by Venue Norway (18–3) Away (7–4)

- ▲ ▼ indicates the result of the Davis Cup match followed by the score, date, place of event, the zonal classification and its phase, and the court surface.

Rubber result	No.	Rubber	Match type (partner if any)	Opponent nation	Opponent player(s)	Score
▲3–0; 16 July 2015; San Marino, City of San Marino, San Marino; Group III Europe; clay surface
Win	1	I	Singles	Armenia	Mikayel Khachatryan	6–0, 6–0
▲3–0; 17 July 2015; San Marino, City of San Marino, San Marino; Group III Europe; clay surface
Win	2	I	Singles	North Macedonia	Dimitar Grabul	1–6, 6–1, 6–2
▲2–0; 18 July 2015; San Marino, City of San Marino, San Marino; Group III Europe play-off; clay surface
Win	3	I	Singles	Cyprus	Christos Hadjigeorgiou	6–1, 6–2
▼2–3; 4–6 March 2016; Siauliu Arena, Siauliu, Lithuania; Group II Europe/Africa Zone 1st round; hard(i) surface
Loss	4	I	Singles	Lithuania	Ričardas Berankis	2–6, 1–6, 4–6
Loss	5	III	Doubles (with Viktor Durasovic)	Lithuania	Ričardas Berankis / Laurynas Grigelis	2–6, 6–7^{(2–7)}, 1–6
Win	6	V	Singles	Lithuania	Lukas Mugevicius	6–3, 6–3
▲3–2; 15–17 July 2016; Tennis Club Cap on Line, Capellen, Luxembourg; Group II Europe/Africa Zone Relegation Play-offs; hard surface
Win	7	I	Singles	Luxembourg	Alex Knaff	6–2, 6–4, 6–4
Loss	8	III	Doubles (with Viktor Durasovic)	Luxembourg	Gilles Kremer / Mike Scheidweiler	2–6, 2–6, 7–5, 0–6
Loss	9	IV	Singles	Luxembourg	Ugo Nastasi	6–7^{(5–7)}, 6–2, 6–7^{(0–7)}, 7–6^{(7–4)}, 4–6
▲5–0; 3–5 February 2017; Zemgales Olimpiskais centrs, Jelgava, Latvia; Group II Europe/Africa Zone 1st round; hard(i) surface
Win	10	I	Singles	Latvia	Martins Podzus	6–3, 6–1, 7–5
Win	11	III	Doubles (with Viktor Durasovic)	Latvia	Miķelis Lībietis / Martins Podzus	6–3, 7–6^{(7–2)}, 6–7^{(5–7)}, 6–2
▼1–4; 7–9 April 2017; Stavanger Forum Expo, Stavanger, Norway; Group II Europe/Africa Zone 2nd round; hard(i) surface
Win	12	I	Singles	Denmark	Søren Hess-Olesen	6–3, 5–7, 7–5, 6–2
Loss	13	III	Doubles (with Viktor Durasovic)	Denmark	Thomas Kromann / Frederik Nielsen	4–6, 6–4, 2–6, 2–6
Loss	14	IV	Singles	Denmark	Frederik Nielsen	4–6, 2–6, 3–6
▲3–1; 7–8 April 2018; Oslo Tennis Arena, Oslo, Norway; Group II Europe/Africa Zone Relegation Play-offs; hard(i) surface
Win	15	II	Singles	(Republic of Ireland) Ireland	Simon Carr	6–2, 6–1
Win	16	III	Doubles (with Viktor Durasovic)	(Republic of Ireland) Ireland	Peter Bothwell / Simon Carr	6–2, 6–2
Win	17	IV	Singles	(Republic of Ireland) Ireland	Peter Bothwell	6–3, 7–5
▲3–1; 13–14 September 2019; Njård Tennisklubb, Oslo, Norway; Group II Europe/Africa Zone; clay surface
Win	18	II	Singles	(Georgia (country)) Georgia	George Tsivadze	6–1, 6–0
Win	19	III	Doubles (with Viktor Durasovic)	(Georgia (country)) Georgia	Aleksandre Bakshi / Aleksandre Metreveli	6–4, 6–3
Win	20	IV	Singles	(Georgia (country)) Georgia	Aleksandre Metreveli	6–3, 6–2
▲4–0; 6–7 March 2020; Oslo Tennis Arena, Oslo, Norway; World Group I play-offs; hard(i) surface
Win	21	II	Singles	Barbados	Haydn Lewis	6–2, 6–2
Win	22	III	Doubles (with Viktor Durasovic)	Barbados	Haydn Lewis / Kaipo Marshall	6–3, 6–2
▲3–1; 17–18 September 2021; Oslo Tennis Arena, Oslo, Norway; World Group I; hard(i) surface
Win	23	I	Singles	Uzbekistan	Khumoyun Sultanov	6–3, 6–3
Loss	24	III	Doubles (with Viktor Durasovic)	Uzbekistan	Sanjar Fayziev / Denis Istomin	6–7^{(2–7)}, 3–6
Win	25	IV	Singles	Uzbekistan	Sanjar Fayziev	6–3, 6–1
▲3–1; 26–27 November 2021; Oslo Tennis Arena, Oslo, Norway; World Group I Knock-outs; hard(i) surface
Win	26	II	Singles	Ukraine	Vitaliy Sachko	6–3, 6–2
Loss	27	III	Doubles (with Viktor Durasovic)	Ukraine	Denys Molchanov / Sergiy Stakhovsky	6–7^{(4–7)}, 3–6
Win	28	IV	Singles	Ukraine	Sergiy Stakhovsky	4–6, 6–3, 7–6^{(7–4)}
▼1–3; 4–5 March 2022; Oslo Tennis Arena, Oslo, Norway; Davis Cup qualifying round; hard(i) surface
Win	29	I	Singles	Kazakhstan	Mikhail Kukushkin	6–1, 6–4
Loss	30	IV	Singles	Kazakhstan	Alexander Bublik	4–6, 7–5, 4–6
▲3–1; 16–17 September 2022; Håkons Hall, Lillehammer, Norway; World Group I Knock-outs; hard(i) surface
Win	31	I	Singles	India	Prajnesh Gunneswaran	6–1, 6–4
Win	32	III	Doubles (with Viktor Durasovic)	India	Yuki Bhambri / Saketh Myneni	6–3, 3–6, 6–3

=== ATP Cup (5–5) ===
Matches by type
Singles (4–2)
Doubles (1–3)

Result	No.	Rubber	Match type (partner if any)	Opponent nation	Opponent player(s)	Score
▼3–6; 3–7 January 2020; Perth Arena, Perth, Australia; group stage; hard surface
Win	1	II	Singles	United States	John Isner	6–7^{(3–7)}, 7–6^{(12–10)}, 7–5
Win	2	III	Doubles (with Viktor Durasovic)	United States	Austin Krajicek / Rajeev Ram	4–6, 6–3, [10–5]
Win	3	II	Singles	Italy	Fabio Fognini	6–2, 6–2
Loss	4	III	Doubles (with Viktor Durasovic)	Italy	Simone Bolelli / Fabio Fognini	3–6, 6–7^{(3–7)}
Loss	5	II	Singles	Russia	Daniil Medvedev	3–6, 6–7^{(6–8)}
Loss	6	III	Doubles (with Viktor Durasovic)	Russia	Teymuraz Gabashvili / Konstantin Kravchuk	6–7^{(4–7)}, 4–6
▼2–7; 1–5 January 2022; Ken Roswell Arena, Sydney, Australia; group stage; hard surface
Win	7	II	Singles	Serbia	Dušan Lajović	6–3, 7–5
Loss	8	III	Doubles (with Viktor Durasovic)	Serbia	Nikola Ćaćić / Filip Krajinović	6–7^{(3–7)}, 3–6
Loss	9	II	Singles	(Spain)	Roberto Bautista Agut	4–6, 6–7^{(4–7)}
Win	10	II	Singles	Chile	Cristian Garín	6–4, 6–1

=== United Cup (4–1) ===
Group membership United Cup (4–1)	Matches by Surface Hard (4–1)	Matches by Type Singles (4–1) Doubles (0–0)	Matches by setting Outdoors (4–1) Indoors (0–0)

Outcome	No.	Surface	Match type (partner)	Opponent nation	Opponent player(s)	Score
2023
29 December–8 January; Pat Rafter Arena, Brisbane, Australia; group stage; hard surface
Win	1.	Hard	Singles	Brazil	(Brazil) Thiago Monteiro	6–3, 6–2
Loss	2.	Hard	Singles	Italy	(Italy) Matteo Berrettini	4–6, 4–6
2024
29 December–7 January; Ken Rosewall Arena, Sydney, Australia; group stage; hard surface
Win	3.	Hard	Singles	Netherlands	(Netherlands) Tallon Griekspoor	6–3, 6–4
Win	4.	Hard	Singles	Croatia	(Croatia) Borna Ćorić	6–4, 6–1
Win	5.	Hard	Singles	France	(France) Adrian Mannarino	6–1, 6–4

=== Laver Cup (6–3) ===
Matches by type Singles (4–1) Doubles (2–2)	Matches by points Day 1, 1 point (3–1) Day 2, 2 points (1–2) Day 3, 3 points (2–0)	Matches by venue Europe (2–2) Rest of world (4–1)

Result	No.	Day (points)	Match type (partner if any)	Opponent team	Opponent player(s)	Score
▲14–1; 24–26 September 2021; TD Garden, Boston, United States, hard (i) surface
Win	1	Day 1 (1 point)	Singles	Team World	(United States) Reilly Opelka	6–3, 7–6^{(7–4)}
▼8–13; 23–25 September 2022; The O2 Arena, London, United Kingdom, hard (i) surface
Win	2	Day 1 (1 point)	Singles	Team World	(United States) Jack Sock	6–4, 5–7, [10–7]
▼2–13; 22–24 September 2023; Rogers Arena, Vancouver, Canada, hard (i) surface
Win	3	Day 2 (2 points)	Singles	Team World	(United States) Tommy Paul	7–6^{(8–6)}, 6–2
▲13–11; 20–22 September 2024; Uber Arena, Berlin, Germany, hard (i) surface
Loss	4	Day 1 (1 point)	Singles	Team World	(Argentina) Francisco Cerúndolo	4–6, 4–6
Loss	5	Day 2 (2 points)	Doubles (with (Greece) Stefanos Tsitsipas)	Team World	(United States) Ben Shelton / (Chile) Alejandro Tabilo	1–6, 2–6
Win	6	Day 3 (3 points)	Doubles (with (Spain) Carlos Alcaraz)	Team World	(United States) Ben Shelton / (United States) Frances Tiafoe	6–2, 7–6^{(8–6)}
3–9; 19–21 September 2025; Chase Center, San Francisco, United States, hard (i) surface
Win	7	Day 1 (1 point)	Singles	Team World	(United States) Reilly Opelka	6–4, 7–6^{(7–4)}
Loss	8	Day 2 (2 points)	Doubles (with (Denmark) Holger Rune)	Team World	(Australia) Alex de Minaur / (United States) Alex Michelsen	3–6, 4–6
Win	9	Day 3 (3 points)	Doubles (with (Spain) Carlos Alcaraz)	Team World	(United States) Alex Michelsen / (United States) Reilly Opelka	7–6^{(7–4)}, 6–1

== Longest winning streaks ==
=== 13 match win streak (2021) ===
#	Tournament	Category	Start date	Surface	Rd	Opponent	Rank	Score
–	Wimbledon	Grand Slam	30 June 2021	Grass	1R	(Australia) Jordan Thompson	No. 78	6–7^{(6–8)}, 6–7^{(3–7)}, 6–2, 6–2, 2–6
1	Swedish Open	ATP 250	12 July 2021	Clay	2R	(Denmark) Holger Rune (WC)	No. 211	6–0, 6–2
–	Swedish Open	ATP 250	12 July 2021	Clay	QF	(Switzerland) Henri Laaksonen (Q)	No. 134	w/o
2	Swedish Open	ATP 250	12 July 2021	Clay	SF	(Spain) Roberto Carballés Baena (6)	No. 97	6–1, 6–4
3	Swedish Open	ATP 250	12 July 2021	Clay	F	(Argentina) Federico Coria	No. 71	6–3, 6–3
4	Swiss Open	ATP 250	19 July 2021	Clay	2R	(Austria) Dennis Novak	No. 124	6–4, 7–6^{(7–5)}
5	Swiss Open	ATP 250	19 July 2021	Clay	QF	(France) Benoît Paire (6)	No. 49	6–2, 5–7, 6–3
6	Swiss Open	ATP 250	19 July 2021	Clay	SF	(Czech Republic) Vít Kopřiva (Q)	No. 249	6–3, 6–0
7	Swiss Open	ATP 250	19 July 2021	Clay	F	(France) Hugo Gaston	No. 155	6–3, 6–2
8	Austrian Open Kitzbühel	ATP 250	24 July 2021	Clay	2R	(Spain) Mario Vilella Martínez (LL)	No. 167	7–5, 5–7, 6–4
9	Austrian Open Kitzbühel	ATP 250	24 July 2021	Clay	QF	(Sweden) Mikael Ymer	No. 99	3–6, 7–6^{(7–5)}, 6–1
10	Austrian Open Kitzbühel	ATP 250	24 July 2021	Clay	SF	(France) Arthur Rinderknech (Alt)	No. 91	6–3, 7–6^{(9–7)}
11	Austrian Open Kitzbühel	ATP 250	24 July 2021	Clay	F	(Spain) Pedro Martínez	No. 97	6–1, 4–6, 6–3
12	Canadian Open	Masters 1000	6 August 2021	Hard	2R	(Croatia) Marin Čilić	No. 38	6–3, 3–6, 6–3
13	Canadian Open	Masters 1000	6 August 2021	Hard	3R	(Serbia) Dušan Lajović	No. 44	6–4, 6–3
ended	Canadian Open	Masters 1000	6 August 2021	Hard	QF	(Greece) Stefanos Tsitsipas (3)	No. 3	1–6, 4–6

== Exhibition matches ==
=== Singles ===
Result	Date	Tournament	Surface	Opponent	Score
Loss	Jun 2022	Giorgio Armani Tennis Classic, London, United Kingdom	Grass	(Belgium) Zizou Bergs	4–6, 4–6
Win	Jun 2022	Giorgio Armani Tennis Classic, London, United Kingdom	Grass	(Spain) Carlos Alcaraz	7–6^{(6–2)}, 6–2
Loss	Nov 2022	La Revancha, Buenos Aires, Argentina	Hard (i)	(Spain) Rafael Nadal	6–7^{(8–10)}, 2–6
Loss	Nov 2022	Rafa Nadal no Brasil, Belo Horizonte, Brazil	Hard (i)	(Spain) Rafael Nadal	6–7^{(4–7)}, 5–7
Win	Nov 2022	Copa Kia Quito Bicentenario, Quito, Ecuador	Hard (i)	(Spain) Rafael Nadal	6–4, 6–4
Loss	Nov 2022	Copa Electrolit, Bogotá, Colombia	Hard (i)	(Spain) Rafael Nadal	5–7, 4–6
Loss	Dec 2022	2022 Tennis Fest, Mexico City, Mexico	Hard	(Spain) Rafael Nadal	6–7^{(7–9)}, 4–6
Loss	Dec 2022	Mubadala World Tennis Championship, Abu Dhabi, UAE	Hard	(Greece) Stefanos Tsitsipas	2–6, 2–6
Win	Dec 2022	Mubadala World Tennis Championship, Abu Dhabi, UAE	Hard	(Spain) Carlos Alcaraz	6–1, 6–4
Win	Apr 2023	Red Bull Bassline, Madrid, Spain	Clay	(United States) Sebastian Korda	7–0, 9–7
Win	Apr 2023	Red Bull Bassline, Madrid, Spain	Clay	(Spain) Feliciano López	7–3, 7–3
Loss	Apr 2023	Red Bull Bassline, Madrid, Spain	Clay	Andrey Rublev	4–7, 2–7
Win	Jul 2023	Giorgio Armani Tennis Classic, London, United Kingdom	Grass	(Australia) Alexei Popyrin	2–6, 7–6^{(7–4)}, 1–0^{(10–3)}
Loss	Jan 2024	Australian Open Opening Week Charity Match, Melbourne, Australia	Hard	(Spain) Carlos Alcaraz	4–6, 2–6
Win	Dec 2024	Nordic Battle, Asker/Copenhagen, Norway/Denmark	Hard (i)	(Denmark) Holger Rune	4–6, 6–4, [10–7]
Loss	Dec 2024	Nordic Battle, Asker/Copenhagen, Norway/Denmark	Hard (i)	(Denmark) Holger Rune	4–6, 2–6
Loss	Dec 2024	Nordic Battle, Asker/Copenhagen, Norway/Denmark	Hard (i)	(Denmark) Holger Rune	6–10
Loss	Dec 2024	MGM Macau Tennis Masters, Macau, China	Hard	Andrey Rublev	4–6, 5–7
Win	Apr 2025	Ultimate Tennis Showdown, Nîmes, France	Clay	(Czech Republic) Tomáš Macháč	12–13, 16–14, 15–14, 15–11
Loss	Jan 2026	Australian Open Opening Week, Melbourne, Australia	Hard	(Switzerland) Roger Federer	[2–7]
Loss	Apr 2026	Ultimate Tennis Showdown, Nîmes, France	Clay	(Canada) Félix Auger-Aliassime	11–10, 10–14, 15–14, 11–15, 0–2

== ATP Tour career earnings ==
Year	Majors	ATP wins	Total wins	Earnings ($)	Money list rank
2014	0	0	0	572	
2015	0	0	0	1,612	1514T
2016	0	0	0	35,064	377
2017	0	0	0	223,662	162
2018	0	0	0	341,226	139
2019	0	0	0	848,872	70
2020	0	1	1	1,013,473	21
2021	0	5	5	2,314,629	8
2022	0	3	3	8,126,816	4
2023	0	1	1	3,473,277	11
2024	0	2	2	5,065,307	6
2025	0	2	2	3,971,374	10
2026	0	0	0	990,579	20
Career	0	14	14	$28,216,069	20

* Statistics correct as of 4 May 2025.
