= 2021 San Diego Open =

- Date: September 27–October 3
- Edition: 35th (1st as ATP 250 event)
- Category: ATP Tour 250
- Draw: 28S / 16D
- Prize money: $600,000
- Surface: Hard / outdoor
- Location: San Diego, United States
- Venue: Barnes Tennis Center

Champions

Singles
- (Norway) Casper Ruud

Doubles
- (United Kingdom) Joe Salisbury / (United Kingdom) Neal Skupski
- San Diego Open

The 2021 San Diego Open was a men's tennis tournament played on outdoor hard courts. It was the 1st edition of the San Diego Open, and part of the ATP Tour 250 series of the 2021 ATP Tour. It was held at the Barnes Tennis Center in San Diego, United States, from September 27 until October 3, 2021. It was primarily organized due to the cancellation of Asian tournaments during the 2021 season, because of the ongoing COVID-19 pandemic.

Positioned one week before the 1000 Indian Wells Masters and only a 2-hour 30 min drive from Indian Wells, the San Diego Open attracted a very strong line up of players including Denis Shapovalov, Andrey Rublev, Grigor Dimitrov and Andy Murray. With 8 of the top 20 players attending and the ranking cut off being 42 to get into the main draw it was the second most competitive ATP 250 all season since Doha.

Daniel Vallverdu took on the position of managing director, Ryan Redondo was named the tournament director and Billie Jean King accepted the role of honorary tournament chair.

== Finals ==
=== Singles ===
(Norway) Casper Ruud defeated (United Kingdom) Cameron Norrie, 6–0, 6–2

- It was Ruud's 5th and last singles title of the year and the 6th of his career.

=== Doubles ===
(United Kingdom) Joe Salisbury / (United Kingdom) Neal Skupski defeated (Australia) John Peers / (Slovakia) Filip Polášek, 7–6^{(7–2)}, 3–6, [10–5]

== Singles main-draw entrants ==
=== Seeds ===
Country	Player	Rank^{1}	Seed
RUS	Andrey Rublev	5	1
NOR	Casper Ruud	10	2
~~CAN~~	~~Félix Auger-Aliassime~~	~~11~~	~~3~~
CAN	Denis Shapovalov	12	4
POL	Hubert Hurkacz	13	5
ARG	Diego Schwartzman	15	6
~~CHI~~	~~Cristian Garín~~	~~17~~	~~7~~
GBR	Dan Evans	23	8
ITA	Lorenzo Sonego	24	9

- ^{1} Rankings are as of 20 September 2021.

=== Other entrants ===
The following players received wildcards into the main draw:

- (United Kingdom) Andy Murray
- (United States) Brandon Nakashima
- ~~(Japan) Kei Nishikori~~

The following player received entry as a special exempt:

- ~~(South Korea) Kwon Soon-woo~~

The following players received entry from the qualifying draw:

- (Australia) Alex Bolt
- (Italy) Salvatore Caruso
- (United States) Christopher Eubanks
- (Italy) Federico Gaio

The following players received entry as lucky losers:

- (South Africa) Kevin Anderson
- (Denmark) August Holmgren
- (United States) Denis Kudla

=== Withdrawals ===
Before the tournament

- (Canada) Félix Auger-Aliassime → replaced by (Denmark) August Holmgren
- (Chile) Cristian Garín → replaced by (Germany) Dominik Koepfer
- (Belgium) David Goffin → replaced by (United States) Sebastian Korda
- (South Korea) Kwon Soon-woo → replaced by (South Africa) Kevin Anderson
- (Serbia) Dušan Lajović → replaced by (South Africa) Lloyd Harris
- (Japan) Kei Nishikori → replaced by (United States) Denis Kudla
- (United States) Reilly Opelka → replaced by (Argentina) Federico Delbonis

== Doubles main-draw entrants ==
=== Seeds ===
Country	Player	Country	Player	Rank^{1}	Seed
GBR	Joe Salisbury	GBR	Neal Skupski	25	1
GBR	Jamie Murray	BRA	Bruno Soares	29	2
AUS	John Peers	SVK	Filip Polášek	33	3
ITA	Simone Bolelli	ARG	Máximo González	57	4

- ^{1} Rankings are as of 20 September 2021.

=== Other entrants ===
The following pairs received wildcards into the doubles main draw:

- (United States) Brandon Nakashima / (Netherlands) Sem Verbeek
- (Croatia) Antonio Šančić / (New Zealand) Artem Sitak

=== Withdrawals ===
Before the tournament

- (United States) Nicholas Monroe / (United States) Frances Tiafoe → replaced by (Germany) Dominik Koepfer / (United States) Nicholas Monroe
- (United States) Rajeev Ram / (United States) Jack Sock → replaced by (Australia) Jordan Thompson / (United States) Jackson Withrow
