= 2019 U.S. Men's Clay Court Championships – Doubles =

Doubles
- 2019 U.S. Men's Clay Court Championships

Final
- Champions: (Mexico) Santiago González (Pakistan) Aisam-ul-Haq Qureshi
- Runners-up: (United Kingdom) Ken Skupski (United Kingdom) Neal Skupski
- Score: 3–6, 6–4, [10–6]

Details
- Draw: 16
- Seeds: 4

Events
Singles	Doubles
- U.S. Men's Clay Court Championships

Santiago González and Aisam-ul-Haq Qureshi defeated brothers Ken and Neal Skupski in the final, 3–6, 6–4, [10–6], to win the doubles tennis title at the 2019 U.S. Men's Clay Court Championships. The win earned the team their first ATP Tour title together, though it individually marked Gonzalez his 13th and Qureshi his 17th. The Skupski brothers were contending to win their second tour-level title as a team.

Max Mirnyi and Philipp Oswald were the defending champions, but Mirnyi retired from professional tennis at the end of 2018 and Oswald chose to compete in Marrakesh instead.

== Seeds ==
1. (United States) Bob Bryan / (United States) Mike Bryan (semifinals)
2. (United States) Austin Krajicek / (New Zealand) Artem Sitak (semifinals)
3. (United Kingdom) Luke Bambridge / (United Kingdom) Jonny O'Mara (first round)
4. (United Kingdom) Ken Skupski / (United Kingdom) Neal Skupski (final)

== Draw ==
Key

- Q = Qualifier
- WC = Wild card
- LL = Lucky loser
- Alt = Alternate
- ITF = ITF entry
- PR = Protected ranking
- SR = Special ranking
- SE = Special exempt
- JE = Junior exempt
- JR = Junior Accelerator Programme entrant
- CO = College Accelerator Programme entrant
- NG = Next Gen Accelerator Program entrant
- w/o = Walkover
- r = Retired
- d = Defaulted

=== Draw ===
First round
1	(United States) B Bryan (United States) M Bryan	6	6^{5}	[10]
WC	(United States) R Galloway (United States) N Lammons	3	7^{7}	[4]
(United States) N Monroe (Mexico) MÁ Reyes-Varela	3	7^{7}	[8]
(India) J Nedunchezhiyan (India) P Raja	6	6^{5}	[10]
3	(United Kingdom) L Bambridge (United Kingdom) J O'Mara	3	4
(United States) T Fritz (United States) R Opelka	6	6
(Mexico) S González (Pakistan) A-u-H Qureshi	6	7
(Spain) M Granollers (Australia) M Reid	1	5
(Uruguay) P Cuevas (Bolivia) H Dellien	5	3
(France) J Chardy (France) F Martin	7	6
(United States) B Klahn (United States) S Querrey	3	6	[9]
4	(United Kingdom) K Skupski (United Kingdom) N Skupski	6	2	[11]
(United States) R Harrison (United States) M McDonald	4	6	[10]
(El Salvador) M Arévalo (United States) J Cerretani	6	4	[2]
WC	(Australia) L Hewitt (Australia) J Thompson	2	6	[8]
2	(United States) A Krajicek (New Zealand) A Sitak	6	4	[10]

Quarterfinals
1	(United States) B Bryan (United States) M Bryan	7^{7}	6
(India) J Nedunchezhiyan (India) P Raja	6^{5}	3
(United States) T Fritz (United States) R Opelka
(Mexico) S González (Pakistan) A-u-H Qureshi	w/o
(France) J Chardy (France) F Martin	6	3	[12]
4	(United Kingdom) K Skupski (United Kingdom) N Skupski	3	6	[14]
(United States) R Harrison (United States) M McDonald	0	5
2	(United States) A Krajicek (New Zealand) A Sitak	6	7

Semifinals
1	(United States) B Bryan (United States) M Bryan	4	2
(Mexico) S González (Pakistan) A-u-H Qureshi	6	6
4	(United Kingdom) K Skupski (United Kingdom) N Skupski	6	6
2	(United States) A Krajicek (New Zealand) A Sitak	1	4

Final
(Mexico) S González (Pakistan) A-u-H Qureshi	3	6	[10]
4	(United Kingdom) K Skupski (United Kingdom) N Skupski	6	4	[6]
