= 2021 San Diego Open – Singles =

Singles
- 2021 San Diego Open

Final
- Champion: (Norway) Casper Ruud
- Runner-up: (United Kingdom) Cameron Norrie
- Score: 6–0, 6–2

Details
- Draw: 28 (4 Q / 2 WC )
- Seeds: 8

Events
| Singles | Doubles |
| San Diego Open | · 2022 → |

This was the first edition of the tournament, which was primarily organized to compensate for the cancellation of Asian tournaments in 2021 due to the COVID-19 pandemic.

Casper Ruud won the title, defeating Cameron Norrie in the final, 6–0, 6–2. It was Ruud's fifth victory of the season.

== Seeds ==
The top four seeds received a bye into the second round.

1. (Russia) Andrey Rublev (semifinals)
2. (Norway) Casper Ruud (champion)
3. (Canada) Félix Auger-Aliassime (withdrew)
4. (Canada) Denis Shapovalov (quarterfinals)
5. (Poland) Hubert Hurkacz (second round)
6. (Argentina) Diego Schwartzman (quarterfinals)
7. (Chile) Cristian Garín (withdrew)
8. (United Kingdom) Dan Evans (second round)
9. (Italy) Lorenzo Sonego (quarterfinals)

== Draw ==
Key

- Q = Qualifier
- WC = Wild card
- LL = Lucky loser
- Alt = Alternate
- ITF = ITF entry
- PR = Protected ranking
- SR = Special ranking
- SE = Special exempt
- JE = Junior exempt
- JR = Junior Accelerator Programme entrant
- CO = College Accelerator Programme entrant
- NG = Next Gen Accelerator Program entrant
- w/o = Walkover
- r = Retired
- d = Defaulted

=== Finals ===
Semifinals
1 | (Russia) Andrey Rublev | 6 | 3 | 4
(United Kingdom) Cameron Norrie | 3 | 6 | 6
(Bulgaria) Grigor Dimitrov | 4 | 6 | 4
2 | (Norway) Casper Ruud | 6 | 4 | 6

Final
(United Kingdom) Cameron Norrie | 0 | 2
2 | (Norway) Casper Ruud | 6 | 6

=== Top half ===
First round
(Italy) F Fognini | 7^{7} | 1 | 5
WC | (United States) B Nakashima | 6^{5} | 6 | 7
(South Africa) L Harris | 3 | 6 | 6
Q | (United States) C Eubanks | 6 | 1 | 4
Q | (Italy) F Gaio | 2 | 3
6 | (Argentina) D Schwartzman | 6 | 6
Q | (Italy) S Caruso | 4 | 6^{2}
(United States) T Fritz | 6 | 7^{7}
(Germany) D Koepfer | 2 | 5
(United Kingdom) C Norrie | 6 | 7
LL | (South Africa) K Anderson | 6^{11} | 5
8 | (United Kingdom) D Evans | 7^{13} | 7

Second round
1 | (Russia) A Rublev | 6 | 6
WC | (United States) B Nakashima | 2 | 1
(South Africa) L Harris | 6 | 3 | 2
6 | (Argentina) D Schwartzman | 4 | 6 | 6
4 | (Canada) D Shapovalov | 7^{9} | 6
(United States) T Fritz | 6^{7} | 2
(United Kingdom) C Norrie | 7^{7} | 6
8 | (United Kingdom) D Evans | 6^{3} | 3

Quarterfinals
1 | (Russia) A Rublev | 6 | 7
6 | (Argentina) D Schwartzman | 1 | 5
4 | (Canada) D Shapovalov | 3 | 1
(United Kingdom) C Norrie | 6 | 6

Semifinals
1 | (Russia) A Rublev | 6 | 3 | 4
(United Kingdom) C Norrie | 3 | 6 | 6

=== Bottom half ===
First round
5 | (Poland) H Hurkacz | 7^{7} | 6
Q | (Australia) A Bolt | 6^{2} | 1
(Russia) A Karatsev | 6 | 7
(Argentina) F Delbonis | 1 | 5
(Hungary) M Fucsovics | 3 | 6 | 5
(Bulgaria) G Dimitrov | 6 | 1 | 7
9 | (Italy) L Sonego | 6 | 6
(Georgia (country)) N Basilashvili | 3 | 4
(United States) S Korda | 6 | 5 | 6
(United States) T Paul | 3 | 7 | 1
LL | (United States) D Kudla | 3 | 2
WC | (United Kingdom) A Murray | 6 | 6

Second round
5 | (Poland) H Hurkacz | 7 | 4 | 2
(Russia) A Karatsev | 5 | 6 | 6
(Bulgaria) G Dimitrov | 6 | 6
LL | (Denmark) A Holmgren | 1 | 1
9 | (Italy) L Sonego | 6 | 6
(United States) S Korda | 4 | 3
WC | (United Kingdom) A Murray | 5 | 4
2 | (Norway) C Ruud | 7 | 6

Quarterfinals
(Russia) A Karatsev | 1 | 6 | 2
(Bulgaria) G Dimitrov | 6 | 1 | 6
9 | (Italy) L Sonego | 1 | 4
2 | (Norway) C Ruud | 6 | 6

Semifinals
(Bulgaria) G Dimitrov | 4 | 6 | 4
2 | (Norway) C Ruud | 6 | 4 | 6

== Qualifying ==
=== Seeds ===
1. (Germany) Dominik Koepfer (moved to main draw)
2. (South Africa) Kevin Anderson (qualifying competition, lucky loser)
3. (Australia) Jordan Thompson (first round)
4. (United States) Steve Johnson (first round)
5. (United States) Denis Kudla (qualifying competition, lucky loser)
6. (Italy) Salvatore Caruso (qualified)
7. (Australia) Alex Bolt (qualified)
8. (United States) Mitchell Krueger (first round)

=== Qualifiers ===
1. (United States) Christopher Eubanks
2. (Australia) Alex Bolt
3. (Italy) Salvatore Caruso
4. (Italy) Federico Gaio

=== Lucky losers ===
1. (South Africa) Kevin Anderson
2. (United States) Denis Kudla
3. (Denmark) August Holmgren

=== Qualifying draw ===
==== First qualifier ====
First round
Alt | (Mexico) Lucas Gómez | 2 | 6 | 1
(Barbados) Darian King | 6 | 3 | 6
(United States) Christopher Eubanks | 6 | 3 | 6
8 | (United States) Mitchell Krueger | 1 | 6 | 3

Qualifying competition
(Barbados) Darian King | 6^{1} | 5
(United States) Christopher Eubanks | 7^{7} | 7

==== Second qualifier ====
First round
2 | (South Africa) Kevin Anderson | 6 | 7
(Australia) Jason Kubler | 3 | 5
WC | (United States) Alafia Ayeni | 4 | 6^{5}
7 | (Australia) Alex Bolt | 6 | 7^{7}

Qualifying competition
2 | (South Africa) Kevin Anderson | 7^{7} | 3 | 5
7 | (Australia) Alex Bolt | 6^{5} | 6 | 7

==== Third qualifier ====
First round
3 | (Australia) Jordan Thompson | 4 | 6^{6}
Alt | (Denmark) August Holmgren | 6 | 7^{8}
(United States) Ernesto Escobedo | 5 | 6 | 4
6 | (Italy) Salvatore Caruso | 7 | 1 | 6

Qualifying competition
Alt | (Denmark) August Holmgren | 6 | 3 | 6^{7}
6 | (Italy) Salvatore Caruso | 4 | 6 | 7^{9}

==== Fourth qualifier ====
First round
4 | (United States) Steve Johnson | 6 | 6^{4} | 3
(Italy) Federico Gaio | 3 | 7^{7} | 6
WC | (United States) Zachary Svajda | 6 | 2 | 4
5 | (United States) Denis Kudla | 3 | 6 | 6

Qualifying competition
(Italy) Federico Gaio | 6 | 6
5 | (United States) Denis Kudla | 4 | 2
