= 2021 San Diego Open – Doubles =

Doubles
- 2021 San Diego Open

Final
- Champions: (United Kingdom) Joe Salisbury; (United Kingdom) Neal Skupski
- Runners-up: (Australia) John Peers; (Slovakia) Filip Polášek
- Score: 7–6^{(7–2)}, 3–6, [10–5]

Events
| Singles | Doubles |
- San Diego Open

This was the first edition of the tournament, which was primarily organized to compensate for the cancellation of Asian tournaments in 2021 due to the COVID-19 pandemic.

Joe Salisbury and Neal Skupski won the title, defeating John Peers and Filip Polášek in the final, 7–6^{(7–2)}, 3–6, [10–5].

== Seeds ==
1. (United Kingdom) Joe Salisbury / (United Kingdom) Neal Skupski (champions)
2. (United Kingdom) Jamie Murray / (Brazil) Bruno Soares (first round)
3. (Australia) John Peers / (Slovakia) Filip Polášek (final)
4. (Italy) Simone Bolelli / (Argentina) Máximo González (quarterfinals)

== Draw ==
Key

- Q = Qualifier
- WC = Wild card
- LL = Lucky loser
- Alt = Alternate
- ITF = ITF entry
- PR = Protected ranking
- SR = Special ranking
- SE = Special exempt
- JE = Junior exempt
- JR = Junior Accelerator Programme entrant
- CO = College Accelerator Programme entrant
- NG = Next Gen Accelerator Program entrant
- w/o = Walkover
- r = Retired
- d = Defaulted

=== Draw ===
First round

Quarterfinals

Semifinals

Final

1
(United Kingdom) J Salisbury
(United Kingdom) N Skupski
2
7^{7}
[10]

- (Uruguay) A Behar
- (Ecuador) G Escobar
6
6^{5}
[5]

1
(United Kingdom) J Salisbury
(United Kingdom) N Skupski
6
7

WC
(United States) B Nakashima
(Netherlands) S Verbeek
4
6
[10]

WC
- (United States) B Nakashima
- (Netherlands) S Verbeek
1
5

- (Bulgaria) G Dimitrov
- (Netherlands) J-J Rojer
6
3
[8]

1
(United Kingdom) J Salisbury
(United Kingdom) N Skupski
6
7^{7}

4
(Italy) S Bolelli
(Argentina) M González
4
6
[10]

- (Australia) J Thompson
- (United States) J Withrow
4
6^{3}

- (Germany) D Koepfer
- (United States) N Monroe
6
1
[5]

4
- (Italy) S Bolelli
- (Argentina) M González
3
3

WC
- (Croatia) A Šančić
- (New Zealand) A Sitak
3
4

(Australia) J Thompson
(United States) J Withrow
6
6

(Australia) J Thompson
(United States) J Withrow
6
6

1
(United Kingdom) J Salisbury
(United Kingdom) N Skupski
7^{7}
3
[10]

- (New Zealand) M Daniell
- (New Zealand) M Venus
4
3

3
- (Australia) J Peers
- (Slovakia) F Polášek
6^{2}
6
[5]

(United States) T Fritz
(United States) T Paul
6
6

- (United States) T Fritz
- (United States) T Paul
4
7^{8}
[7]

- (Poland) H Hurkacz
- (Brazil) M Melo
6^{12}
6
[11]

3
(Australia) J Peers
(Slovakia) F Polášek
6
6^{6}
[10]

3
(Australia) J Peers
(Slovakia) F Polášek
7^{14}
4
[13]

3
(Australia) J Peers
(Slovakia) F Polášek
6
6

(United States) A Krajicek
(Germany) A Mies
6
3
[10]

- (El Salvador) M Arévalo
- (Argentina) F Delbonis
2
1

- (United Kingdom) D Evans
- (Italy) F Fognini
1
6
[7]

- (United States) A Krajicek
- (Germany) A Mies
1
6
[5]

(El Salvador) M Arévalo
(Argentina) F Delbonis
6
6

(El Salvador) M Arévalo
(Argentina) F Delbonis
6
3
[10]

2
- (United Kingdom) J Murray
- (Brazil) B Soares
3
3
