= 2019 U.S. Men's Clay Court Championships =

- Date: April 8–14
- Edition: 51st
- Category: ATP Tour 250 series
- Draw: 28S/16D
- Prize money: $583,585
- Surface: Clay / outdoor
- Location: Houston, Texas, United States
- Venue: River Oaks Country Club

Champions

Singles
- (Chile) Cristian Garín

Doubles
- (Mexico) Santiago Gonález / (Pakistan) Aisam-ul-Haq Qureshi
- U.S. Men's Clay Court Championships

The 2019 U.S. Men's Clay Court Championships (also known as the Fayez Sarofim & Co. U.S. Men's Clay Court Championships for sponsorship purposes) was a men's tennis tournament played on outdoor clay courts. It was the 51st edition of the U.S. Men's Clay Court Championships, and an ATP Tour 250 event on the 2019 ATP Tour. It took place at River Oaks Country Club in Houston, Texas, United States, from April 8 through April 14, 2019. Unseeded Cristian Garín won the singles title.

== Finals ==
=== Singles ===
(Chile) Cristian Garín defeated (Norway) Casper Ruud, 7–6^{(7–4)}, 4–6, 6–3

- It was Garín's first singles title of his career.

=== Doubles ===
(Mexico) Santiago González / (Pakistan) Aisam-ul-Haq Qureshi defeated (United Kingdom) Ken Skupski / (United Kingdom) Neal Skupski, 3–6, 6–4, [10–6]

== Singles main-draw entrants ==
=== Seeds ===
Country	Player	Rank^{1}	Seed
USA	Steve Johnson	39	1
FRA	Jérémy Chardy	42	2
GBR	Cameron Norrie	55	3
USA	Reilly Opelka	56	4
USA	Taylor Fritz	58	5
USA	Mackenzie McDonald	59	6
AUS	Jordan Thompson	67	7
USA	Sam Querrey	71	8

- Rankings are as of April 1, 2019.

=== Other entrants ===
The following players received wildcards into the main draw:

- (United States) Bjorn Fratangelo
- (United States) Noah Rubin
- (Serbia) Janko Tipsarević

The following players received entry via the qualifying draw:

- (Colombia) Daniel Elahi Galán
- (Colombia) Santiago Giraldo
- (Serbia) Peđa Krstin
- (Switzerland) Henri Laaksonen

=== Withdrawals ===
Before the tournament

- (United States) John Isner → replaced by (Spain) Marcel Granollers
- (Australia) Nick Kyrgios → replaced by (Italy) Paolo Lorenzi
- (Japan) Yoshihito Nishioka → replaced by (Norway) Casper Ruud

== Doubles main-draw entrants ==
=== Seeds ===
Country	Player	Country	Player	Rank^{1}	Seed
USA	Bob Bryan	USA	Mike Bryan	20	1
USA	Austin Krajicek	NZL	Artem Sitak	80	2
GBR	Luke Bambridge	GBR	Jonny O'Mara	93	3
GBR	Ken Skupski	GBR	Neal Skupski	95	4

- Rankings are as of April 1, 2019.

=== Other entrants ===
The following pairs received wildcards into the doubles main draw:

- (United States) Robert Galloway / (United States) Nathaniel Lammons
- (Australia) Lleyton Hewitt / (Australia) Jordan Thompson

=== Withdrawals ===
During the tournament

- (United States) Taylor Fritz
