= 2019 U.S. Men's Clay Court Championships – Singles =

Singles
- 2019 U.S. Men's Clay Court Championships

Final
- Champion: (Chile) Cristian Garín
- Runner-up: (Norway) Casper Ruud
- Score: 7–6^{(7–4)}, 4–6, 6–3

Details
- Draw: 28 (4 Q / 3 WC )
- Seeds: 8

Events
Singles	Doubles
- U.S. Men's Clay Court Championships

Cristian Garín defeated Casper Ruud in the final, 7–6^{(7–4)}, 4–6, 6–3, to win the singles tennis title at the 2019 U.S. Men's Clay Court Championships. The win earned Garín his first career Association of Tennis Professionals (ATP) singles title and made him the first Chilean ATP title holder in ten years. Ruud was also in contention to win his first ATP Tour title after reaching his first final, joining father Christian Ruud as the only two Norwegian players to reach a final at this level.

Steve Johnson was the two-time defending champion, but he lost in the second round to Daniel Elahi Galán.

== Seeds ==
The top four seeds received a bye into the second round.

1. (United States) Steve Johnson (second round)
2. (France) Jérémy Chardy (second round)
3. (United Kingdom) Cameron Norrie (second round)
4. (United States) Reilly Opelka (second round)
5. (United States) Taylor Fritz (first round)
6. (United States) Mackenzie McDonald (first round)
7. (Australia) Jordan Thompson (quarterfinals)
8. (United States) Sam Querrey (semifinals)

== Draw ==
Key

- Q = Qualifier
- WC = Wild card
- LL = Lucky loser
- Alt = Alternate
- ITF = ITF entry
- PR = Protected ranking
- SR = Special ranking
- SE = Special exempt
- JE = Junior exempt
- JR = Junior Accelerator Programme entrant
- CO = College Accelerator Programme entrant
- NG = Next Gen Accelerator Program entrant
- w/o = Walkover
- r = Retired
- d = Defaulted

=== Finals ===
Semifinals
Q	(Colombia) Daniel Elahi Galán	5	2
(Norway) Casper Ruud	7	6
8	(United States) Sam Querrey	6^{2}	2
(Chile) Cristian Garín	7^{7}	6

Final
(Norway) Casper Ruud	6^{4}	6	3
(Chile) Cristian Garín	7^{7}	4	6

=== Top half ===
First round
Q	(Colombia) DE Galán	7^{7}	6
(Italy) P Lorenzi	6^{5}	4
Q	(Colombia) S Giraldo	6	6
(United States) B Klahn	4	4
Q	(Serbia) P Krstin	5	2
7	(Australia) J Thompson	7	6
(Norway) C Ruud	7^{9}	6
(Bolivia) H Dellien	6^{7}	4
(Australia) B Tomic	7^{10}	7
(United States) D Kudla	6^{8}	5
(Spain) M Granollers	6	4	6
5	(United States) T Fritz	2	6	2

Second round
1	(United States) S Johnson	3	3
Q	(Colombia) DE Galán	6	6
Q	(Colombia) S Giraldo	6	6^{1}	5
7	(Australia) J Thompson	4	7^{7}	7
4	(United States) R Opelka	6	4	4
(Norway) C Ruud	4	6	6
(Australia) B Tomic	1	2
(Spain) M Granollers	6	6

Quarterfinals
Q	(Colombia) DE Galán	6	4	6
7	(Australia) J Thompson	1	6	4
(Norway) C Ruud	6	6
(Spain) M Granollers	1	0

Semifinals
Q	(Colombia) DE Galán	5	2
(Norway) C Ruud	7	6

=== Bottom half ===
First round
8	(United States) S Querrey	6	6
WC	(United States) B Fratangelo	3	4
(Spain) G García López	6^{5}	6	6
WC	(United States) N Rubin	7^{7}	3	3
WC	(Serbia) J Tipsarević	6	7^{7}
(United States) T Sandgren	1	6^{4}
6	(United States) M McDonald	3	4
Q	(Switzerland) H Laaksonen	6	6
(United States) R Harrison	6	6
(Croatia) I Karlović	3	4
(Chile) C Garín	4	6	6
(Uruguay) P Cuevas	6	4	2

Second round
8	(United States) S Querrey	6	6
(Spain) G García López	4	3
WC	(Serbia) J Tipsarević	6	6
3	(United Kingdom) C Norrie	3	4
Q	(Switzerland) H Laaksonen	6	7
(United States) R Harrison	4	5
(Chile) C Garín	3	7^{7}	7^{9}
2	(France) J Chardy	6	6^{4}	6^{7}

Quarterfinals
8	(United States) S Querrey	7^{8}	7^{7}
WC	(Serbia) J Tipsarević	6^{6}	6^{4}
Q	(Switzerland) H Laaksonen	3	2
(Chile) C Garín	6	6

Semifinals
8	(United States) S Querrey	6^{2}	2
(Chile) C Garín	7^{7}	6

== Qualifying ==
=== Seeds ===
1. (Switzerland) Henri Laaksonen (qualified)
2. (Canada) Peter Polansky (first round)
3. (United States) Christopher Eubanks (qualifying competition)
4. (Austria) Sebastian Ofner (first round)
5. (United States) Mitchell Krueger (qualifying competition)
6. (Ecuador) Roberto Quiroz (qualifying competition)
7. (United States) Marcos Giron (first round)
8. (United Kingdom) James Ward (first round)

=== Qualifiers ===
1. (Switzerland) Henri Laaksonen
2. (Serbia) Peđa Krstin
3. (Colombia) Santiago Giraldo
4. (Colombia) Daniel Elahi Galán

=== Qualifying draw ===
==== First qualifier ====
First round
1	(Switzerland) Henri Laaksonen	6	6^{8}	6
(United States) Tommy Paul	4	7^{10}	4
(Germany) Dominik Köpfer	6	3	4
5	(United States) Mitchell Krueger	3	6	6

Qualifying competition
1	(Switzerland) Henri Laaksonen	6	5	6
5	(United States) Mitchell Krueger	3	7	3

==== Second qualifier ====
First round
2	(Canada) Peter Polansky	4	1
(Barbados) Darian King	6	6
(Serbia) Peđa Krstin	6	6
7	(United States) Marcos Giron	4	1

Qualifying competition
(Barbados) Darian King	6^{4}	5
(Serbia) Peđa Krstin	7^{7}	7

==== Third qualifier ====
First round
3	(United States) Christopher Eubanks	6	6
(United Kingdom) Jay Clarke	3	4
Alt	(Colombia) Santiago Giraldo	6	6
8	(United Kingdom) James Ward	4	4

Qualifying competition
3	(United States) Christopher Eubanks	4	4
Alt	(Colombia) Santiago Giraldo	6	6

==== Fourth qualifier ====
First round
4	(Austria) Sebastian Ofner	0	2
WC	(Colombia) Daniel Elahi Galán	6	6
WC	(United States) JC Aragone	2	0
6	(Ecuador) Roberto Quiroz	6	6

Qualifying competition
WC	(Colombia) Daniel Elahi Galán	4	7	6
6	(Ecuador) Roberto Quiroz	6	5	1
