= 2021 Laver Cup =

Fourth edition of the Laver Cup, a men's tennis tournament

- Date: 24–26 September 2021
- Edition: 4th
- Surface: Hard indoor
- Location: Boston, United States
- Venue: TD Garden

Champions
- Team Europe; 14 – 1
- Laver Cup

The 2021 Laver Cup was the fourth edition of the Laver Cup, a men's tennis tournament between teams from Europe and the rest of the world. It was held on indoor hard courts at the TD Garden in Boston, United States from 24 until 26 September.

It was originally scheduled for September 2020, but was postponed due to the COVID-19 pandemic to avoid overlapping with the 2020 French Open, which was rescheduled for 20 September to 4 October.

Team Europe captain Björn Borg and Team World captain John McEnroe reprised their roles from 2019.

Team Europe won the title for a fourth consecutive edition.

== Player selection ==
Roger Federer was originally the first player to confirm his participation for Team Europe on 28 February 2020, but withdrew on 15 August 2021 due to a right knee injury. However, he still attended the tournament to great fanfare. Rafael Nadal also opted out due to a foot injury and Novak Djokovic opted out due to his busy schedule, having played the Olympics and US Open.

Dominic Thiem announced his participation on 24 November 2020, but withdrew on 18 August 2021 due to a wrist injury.

On 16 July 2021, Matteo Berrettini announced he was joining Team Europe. Five days later, Denis Shapovalov, Félix Auger-Aliassime and Diego Schwartzman were the first players confirmed for Team World.

On 13 August 2021, organizers announced that Olympic champion Alexander Zverev would join Team Europe. The next day, Daniil Medvedev was also announced. Team Europe then announced its final line-up on 18 August 2021 with Stefanos Tsitsipas, Andrey Rublev and Casper Ruud also taking part. Team World captain John McEnroe chose Reilly Opelka, John Isner and Nick Kyrgios as his final picks the following day.

== Prize money ==
The total prize money for the 2021 Laver Cup was $2,250,000 for all 12 participating players. Each winning team member earned $250,000 compared to $125,000 each for the losing team.

== Participants ==
Team Europe
Captain: (Sweden) Björn Borg
Vice-captain: (Sweden) Thomas Enqvist
Player	Rank
(Russia) Daniil Medvedev	2
(Greece) Stefanos Tsitsipas	3
(Germany) Alexander Zverev	4
(Russia) Andrey Rublev	5
(Italy) Matteo Berrettini	7
(Norway) Casper Ruud	10
(Spain) Feliciano López	110
(United Kingdom) Cameron Norrie	28

Team World
Captain: (United States) John McEnroe
Vice-captain: (United States) Patrick McEnroe
Player	Rank
(Canada) Félix Auger-Aliassime	11
(Canada) Denis Shapovalov	12
(Argentina) Diego Schwartzman	15
(United States) Reilly Opelka	19
(United States) John Isner	22
(Australia) Nick Kyrgios	95
(United States) Jack Sock	164
(South Africa) Lloyd Harris	31

- Singles rankings as of 20 September 2021

Alternate

== Matches ==
Each match win on day 1 was worth one point, on day 2 two points and on day 3 three points. The first team to 13 points won.

Day	Date	Match type	Team Europe	Team World	Score	Team points after match
1	24 Sep	Singles	(Norway) Casper Ruud	(United States) Reilly Opelka	6–3, 7–6^{(7–4)}	1–0
1	24 Sep	Singles	(Italy) Matteo Berrettini	(Canada) Félix Auger-Aliassime	6–7^{(3–7)}, 7–5, [10–8]	2–0
1	24 Sep	Singles	(Russia) Andrey Rublev	(Argentina) Diego Schwartzman	4–6, 6–3, [11–9]	3–0
1	24 Sep	Doubles	(Italy) M Berrettini / (Germany) A Zverev	(United States) J Isner / (Canada) D Shapovalov	6–4, 6–7^{(2–7)}, [1–10]	3–1
2	25 Sep	Singles	(Greece) Stefanos Tsitsipas	(Australia) Nick Kyrgios	6–3, 6–4	5–1
2	25 Sep	Singles	(Germany) Alexander Zverev	(United States) John Isner	7–6^{(7–5)}, 6–7^{(6–8)}, [10–5]	7–1
2	25 Sep	Singles	(Russia) Daniil Medvedev	(Canada) Denis Shapovalov	6–4, 6–0	9–1
2	25 Sep	Doubles	(Russia) A Rublev / (Greece) S Tsitsipas	(United States) J Isner / (Australia) N Kyrgios	6–7^{(8–10)}, 6–3, [10–4]	11–1
3	26 Sep	Doubles	(Russia) A Rublev / (Germany) A Zverev	(United States) R Opelka / (Canada) D Shapovalov	6–2, 6–7^{(4–7)}, [10–3]	14–1
3	26 Sep	Singles	(Germany) Alexander Zverev	(Canada) Félix Auger-Aliassime	not played	
3	26 Sep	Singles	(Russia) Daniil Medvedev	(Argentina) Diego Schwartzman	not played	
3	26 Sep	Singles	(Greece) Stefanos Tsitsipas	(United States) John Isner	not played	

== Player statistics ==
Player	Team	Nat.	Matches	Matches win–loss			Points win–loss		
Player	Team	Nat.	Matches	Singles	Doubles	Total	Singles	Doubles	Total
Félix Auger-Aliassime	World	(Canada)	1	0–1	0–0	0–1	0–1	0–0	0–1
Matteo Berrettini	Europe	(Italy)	2	1–0	0–1	1–1	1–0	0–1	1–1
John Isner	World	(United States)	3	0–1	1–1	1–2	0–2	1–2	1–4
Nick Kyrgios	World	(Australia)	2	0–1	0–1	0–2	0–2	0–2	0–4
Daniil Medvedev	Europe	(Russia)	1	1–0	0–0	1–0	2–0	0–0	2–0
Reilly Opelka	World	(United States)	2	0–1	0–1	0–2	0–1	0–3	0–4
Andrey Rublev	Europe	(Russia)	3	1–0	2–0	3–0	1–0	5–0	6–0
Casper Ruud	Europe	(Norway)	1	1–0	0–0	1–0	1–0	0–0	1–0
Diego Schwartzman	World	(Argentina)	1	0–1	0–0	0–1	0–1	0–0	0–1
Denis Shapovalov	World	(Canada)	3	0–1	1–1	1–2	0–2	1–3	1–5
Stefanos Tsitsipas	Europe	(Greece)	2	1–0	1–0	2–0	2–0	2–0	4–0
Alexander Zverev	Europe	(Germany)	3	1–0	1–1	2–1	2–0	3–1	5–1

== Post-tournament exhibition doubles match ==
As only one match was required on Day 3 of the 2021 Laver Cup, an exhibition match was played following the trophy ceremony.

Day	Date	Match type	Team Europe	Team World	Score
3	26 Sep	Exhibition doubles	(Russia) D Medvedev / (Norway) C Ruud	(Canada) F Auger-Aliassime / (Argentina) D Schwartzman	3–6, 3–6
