= 2024 Monte-Carlo Masters – Singles =

Tennis tournament event

Singles
- 2024 Monte-Carlo Masters

Final
- Champion: (Greece) Stefanos Tsitsipas
- Runner-up: (Norway) Casper Ruud
- Score: 6–1, 6–4

Details
- Draw: 56 (7 Q / 4 WC)
- Seeds: 16

Events
Singles	Doubles
- Monte-Carlo Masters

Stefanos Tsitsipas defeated Casper Ruud in the final, 6–1, 6–4 to win the men's singles tennis title at the 2024 Monte-Carlo Masters. It was his third Monte-Carlo Masters title (in four years) and eleventh ATP Tour singles title. Tsitsipas became the fifth player in the Open Era to win three titles at the tournament, after Ilie Năstase (3), Björn Borg (3), Thomas Muster (3) and Rafael Nadal (11).

Andrey Rublev was the defending champion, but lost in the second round to Alexei Popyrin. Rublev became the first defending champion to lose his opening match at the tournament since Novak Djokovic in 2016.

Djokovic was attempting to become the first player to complete a triple career Golden Masters, but lost in the semifinals to Ruud. With his victory over Alex de Minaur in the quarterfinals, Djokovic reached his 77th career ATP 1000 semifinal, overtaking the previous record jointly held with Nadal. Djokovic retained the world No. 1 ranking after Carlos Alcaraz withdrew before his first match.

Sumit Nagal became the first Indian player to qualify for the main draw since Ramesh Krishnan in 1982. His first round victory against Matteo Arnaldi made him the first Indian player to win an ATP 1000 singles match on clay. Zhang Zhizhen became the first Chinese player to both play the main draw and reach the second round.

== Seeds ==
The top eight seeds received a bye into the second round.

1. (Serbia) Novak Djokovic (semifinals)
2. (Italy) Jannik Sinner (semifinals)
3. (Spain) Carlos Alcaraz (withdrew)
4. Daniil Medvedev (third round)
5. (Germany) Alexander Zverev (third round)
6. Andrey Rublev (second round)
7. (Denmark) Holger Rune (quarterfinals)
8. (Norway) Casper Ruud (final)
9. (Bulgaria) Grigor Dimitrov (third round)
10. (Poland) Hubert Hurkacz (third round)
11. (Australia) Alex de Minaur (quarterfinals)
12. (Greece) Stefanos Tsitsipas (champion)
13. (United States) Taylor Fritz (first round)
14. (France) Ugo Humbert (quarterfinals)
15. Karen Khachanov (quarterfinals)
16. (Kazakhstan) Alexander Bublik (first round)

Click on the seed number of a player to go to their draw section.

== Draw ==
Key

- Q = Qualifier
- WC = Wild card
- LL = Lucky loser
- Alt = Alternate
- ITF = ITF entry
- PR = Protected ranking
- SR = Special ranking
- SE = Special exempt
- JE = Junior exempt
- JR = Junior Accelerator Programme entrant
- CO = College Accelerator Programme entrant
- NG = Next Gen Accelerator Program entrant
- w/o = Walkover
- r = Retired
- d = Defaulted

=== Finals ===
Quarterfinals
1	(Serbia) Novak Djokovic	7	6
11	(Australia) Alex de Minaur	5	4
14	(France) Ugo Humbert	3	6	1
8	(Norway) Casper Ruud	6	4	6
12	(Greece) Stefanos Tsitsipas	6	6
15	Karen Khachanov	4	2
7	(Denmark) Holger Rune	4	7^{8}	3
2	(Italy) Jannik Sinner	6	6^{6}	6

Semifinals
1	(Serbia) Novak Djokovic	4	6	4
8	(Norway) Casper Ruud	6	1	6
12	(Greece) Stefanos Tsitsipas	6	3	6
2	(Italy) Jannik Sinner	4	6	4

Final
8	(Norway) Casper Ruud	1	4
12	(Greece) Stefanos Tsitsipas	6	6

=== Top half ===
==== Section 1 ====
First round
R Safiullin	7	6
Q	(Spain) J Munar	5	1
(France) A Fils	6	6
LL	(Germany) Y Hanfmann	0	2
(Italy) L Musetti	6	6
13	(United States) T Fritz	4	4
11	(Australia) A de Minaur	6	6
WC	(Switzerland) S Wawrinka	3	0
(Germany) D Koepfer	6^{2}	6	2
(Netherlands) T Griekspoor	7^{7}	4	6
(Australia) A Popyrin	3	7	6
Q	(France) C Moutet	6	5	2

Second round
1	(Serbia) N Djokovic	6	6
R Safiullin	1	2
(France) A Fils	3	5
(Italy) L Musetti	6	7
11	(Australia) A de Minaur	2	6	6
(Netherlands) T Griekspoor	6	2	3
(Australia) A Popyrin	6	6
6	A Rublev	4	4

Third round
1	(Serbia) N Djokovic	7	6
(Italy) L Musetti	5	3
11	(Australia) A de Minaur	6	6
(Australia) A Popyrin	3	4

Quarterfinals
1	(Serbia) N Djokovic	7	6
11	(Australia) A de Minaur	5	4

==== Section 2 ====
First round
(Canada) F Auger-Aliassime	6	6
Q	(Italy) L Nardi	2	3
(China) Z Zhang	6	3	6
(United States) M Giron	4	6	3
Q	(Argentina) F Coria	6	1	2
14	(France) U Humbert	4	6	6
10	(Poland) H Hurkacz	6	3	7^{7}
(United Kingdom) J Draper	4	6	6^{2}
Q	(Spain) R Bautista Agut	6	6
LL	(Argentina) F Díaz Acosta	2	4
(Chile) A Tabilo	6	6
Q	(Australia) C O'Connell	3	4

Second round
LL	(Italy) L Sonego	6	7
(Canada) F Auger-Aliassime	4	5
(China) Z Zhang	1	4
14	(France) U Humbert	6	6
10	(Poland) H Hurkacz	7	7^{7}
Q	(Spain) R Bautista Agut	5	6^{4}
(Chile) A Tabilo	2	4
8	(Norway) C Ruud	6	6

Third round
LL	(Italy) L Sonego	7	3	1
14	(France) U Humbert	5	6	6
10	(Poland) H Hurkacz	4	2
8	(Norway) C Ruud	6	6

Quarterfinals
14	(France) U Humbert	3	6	1
8	(Norway) C Ruud	6	4	6

=== Bottom half ===
==== Section 3 ====
First round
(United Kingdom) D Evans	1	4
(Austria) S Ofner	6	6
(Chile) N Jarry	4	5
(Argentina) TM Etcheverry	6	7
(Serbia) L Djere	3	2^{r}
12	(Greece) S Tsitsipas	6	3
15	K Khachanov	7	7^{7}
(United Kingdom) C Norrie	5	6^{3}
(Argentina) F Cerúndolo	6	7^{7}
LL	(Germany) D Altmaier	2	6^{3}
WC	(France) G Monfils	6^{7}	6	7
LL	(Australia) A Vukic	7^{9}	3	5

Second round
5	(Germany) A Zverev	6	6
(Austria) S Ofner	3	4
(Argentina) TM Etcheverry	1	0
12	(Greece) S Tsitsipas	6	6
15	K Khachanov	4	6	6
(Argentina) F Cerúndolo	6	4	3
WC	(France) G Monfils	2	4
4	D Medvedev	6	6

Third round
5	(Germany) A Zverev	5	6^{3}
12	(Greece) S Tsitsipas	7	7^{7}
15	K Khachanov	6	7
4	D Medvedev	3	5

Quarterfinals
12	(Greece) S Tsitsipas	6	6
15	K Khachanov	4	2

==== Section 4 ====
First round
(Italy) M Arnaldi	7	2	4
Q	(India) S Nagal	5	6	6
(Serbia) M Kecmanović	6	6
WC	(Italy) M Berrettini	3	1
WC	(Monaco) V Vacherot	5	2
9	(Bulgaria) G Dimitrov	7	6
16	(Kazakhstan) A Bublik	1	1
(Croatia) B Ćorić	6	6
(Germany) J-L Struff	1	7^{7}	6
(Argentina) S Báez	6	6^{3}	2
(United States) S Korda	6	6
(Spain) A Davidovich Fokina	1	2

Second round
7	(Denmark) H Rune	6	3	6
Q	(India) S Nagal	3	6	2
(Serbia) M Kecmanović	4	3
9	(Bulgaria) G Dimitrov	6	6
(Croatia) B Ćorić	6^{2}	1
(Germany) J-L Struff	7^{7}	6
(United States) S Korda	1	2
2	(Italy) J Sinner	6	6

Third round
7	(Denmark) H Rune	7^{11}	3	7^{7}
9	(Bulgaria) G Dimitrov	6^{9}	6	6^{2}
(Germany) J-L Struff	4	2
2	(Italy) J Sinner	6	6

Quarterfinals
7	(Denmark) H Rune	4	7^{8}	3
2	(Italy) J Sinner	6	6^{6}	6

== Qualifying ==
=== Seeds ===
1. (Germany) Yannick Hanfmann (qualifying competition, lucky loser)
2. (Germany) Daniel Altmaier (qualifying competition, lucky loser)
3. (Argentina) Facundo Díaz Acosta (qualifying competition, lucky loser)
4. (Kazakhstan) Alexander Shevchenko (first round)
5. (Serbia) Dušan Lajović (first round)
6. (Australia) Christopher O'Connell (qualified)
7. (Italy) Lorenzo Sonego (qualifying competition, lucky loser)
8. (Italy) Flavio Cobolli (first round)
9. (Australia) Aleksandar Vukic (qualifying competition, lucky loser)
10. (United States) Alex Michelsen (first round)
11. (Spain) Jaume Munar (qualified)
12. (France) Arthur Cazaux (withdrew)
13. (Italy) Luca Nardi (qualified)
14. (France) Arthur Rinderknech (qualifying competition)

=== Qualifiers ===
1. (Spain) Jaume Munar
2. (France) Corentin Moutet
3. (India) Sumit Nagal
4. (Argentina) Federico Coria
5. (Italy) Luca Nardi
6. (Australia) Christopher O'Connell
7. (Spain) Roberto Bautista Agut

=== Lucky losers ===
1. (Germany) Daniel Altmaier
2. (Argentina) Facundo Díaz Acosta
3. (Germany) Yannick Hanfmann
4. (Italy) Lorenzo Sonego
5. (Australia) Aleksandar Vukic

=== Qualifying draw ===
==== First qualifier ====
First round
1	(Germany) Yannick Hanfmann	4	6	6
(France) Hugo Gaston	6	0	4
(Netherlands) Botic van de Zandschulp	1^{r}
11	(Spain) Jaume Munar	4

Qualifying competition
1	(Germany) Yannick Hanfmann	7^{9}	1	5
11	(Spain) Jaume Munar	6^{7}	6	7

==== Second qualifier ====
First round
2	(Germany) Daniel Altmaier	2	6	6
(France) Luca Van Assche	6	2	3
Alt	(France) Corentin Moutet	6	6
10	(United States) Alex Michelsen	1	3

Qualifying competition
2	(Germany) Daniel Altmaier	2	4
Alt	(France) Corentin Moutet	6	6

==== Third qualifier ====
First round
3	(Argentina) Facundo Díaz Acosta	6	6
WC	(Argentina) Diego Schwartzman	3	4
(India) Sumit Nagal	6	6
8	(Italy) Flavio Cobolli	2	3

Qualifying competition
3	(Argentina) Facundo Díaz Acosta	5	6	2
(India) Sumit Nagal	7	2	6

==== Fourth qualifier ====
First round
4	(Kazakhstan) Alexander Shevchenko	2	4
(Argentina) Federico Coria	6	6
WC	(Monaco) Hugo Nys	3	1
14	(France) Arthur Rinderknech	6	6

Qualifying competition
(Argentina) Federico Coria	6	4	6
14	(France) Arthur Rinderknech	3	6	4

==== Fifth qualifier ====
First round
5	(Serbia) Dušan Lajović	2	3
(France) Alexandre Müller	6	6
WC	(France) Lucas Pouille	4	3
13	(Italy) Luca Nardi	6	6

Qualifying competition
(France) Alexandre Müller	6	4	4
13	(Italy) Luca Nardi	3	6	6

==== Sixth qualifier ====
First round
6	(Australia) Christopher O'Connell	7	3	6
Alt	(Germany) Maximilian Marterer	5	6	3
WC	(Monaco) Lucas Catarina	2	4
9	(Australia) Aleksandar Vukic	6	6

Qualifying competition
6	(Australia) Christopher O'Connell	6	3	7^{7}
9	(Australia) Aleksandar Vukic	2	6	6^{5}

==== Seventh qualifier ====
First round
7	(Italy) Lorenzo Sonego	4	6	6
Alt	(Belgium) David Goffin	6	4	4
(Austria) Dominic Thiem	1	2
Alt	(Spain) Roberto Bautista Agut	6	6

Qualifying competition
7	(Italy) Lorenzo Sonego	1	6	2
Alt	(Spain) Roberto Bautista Agut	6	2	6
