= 2022 ATP Finals – Singles =

2022 tennis tournament

Singles
- 2022 ATP Finals

Final
- Champion: (Serbia) Novak Djokovic
- Runner-up: (Norway) Casper Ruud
- Score: 7–5, 6–3

Details
- Draw: 8 (round robin)

Events
Singles	Doubles
- ATP Finals

Novak Djokovic defeated Casper Ruud in the final, 7–5, 6–3 to win the singles tennis title at the 2022 ATP Finals. It was his sixth Tour Finals title, equaling Roger Federer's record. He became the oldest singles champion in tournament history at 35 years old and also claimed the then-biggest prize check in tennis history at $4,740,300. Djokovic also set the longest time gap between a player's first to most recent Tour Finals titles, at 14 years (the first being in 2008), and became the first player to win Tour Finals titles in three different decades.

Alexander Zverev was the reigning champion, but did not qualify this year.

Carlos Alcaraz became the youngest-ever ATP year-end No. 1, despite withdrawing from the tournament. Rafael Nadal and Stefanos Tsitsipas were also in contention for the year-end No. 1 ranking at the beginning of the tournament.

Félix Auger-Aliassime and Taylor Fritz made their debuts at the event. Alcaraz would have also made his debut, but withdrew due to an injury sustained during the Paris Masters two weeks earlier. He was replaced by Fritz.

Nadal was attempting to complete the career Super Slam. This was also his final appearance at the event.

== Seeds ==
1. (Spain) Rafael Nadal (round robin)
2. (Greece) Stefanos Tsitsipas (round robin)
3. (Norway) Casper Ruud (final)
4. Daniil Medvedev (round robin)
5. (Canada) Félix Auger-Aliassime (round robin)
6. Andrey Rublev (semifinals)
7. (Serbia) Novak Djokovic (champion)
8. (United States) Taylor Fritz (semifinals)

== Alternates ==
1. (Denmark) Holger Rune (did not play)
2. (Poland) Hubert Hurkacz (did not play)

== Draw ==
=== Finals ===
Semifinals
3	(Norway) Casper Ruud	6	6
6	Andrey Rublev	2	4
7	(Serbia) Novak Djokovic	7^{7}	7^{8}
8	(United States) Taylor Fritz	6^{5}	6^{6}

Final
3	(Norway) Casper Ruud	5	3
7	(Serbia) Novak Djokovic	7	6

=== Green group ===
		(Spain) Nadal	(Norway) Ruud	(Canada) A.-Aliassime	(United States) Fritz	RR W–L	Set W–L	Game W–L	Standings
1	(Spain) Rafael Nadal		7–5, 7–5	3–6, 4–6	6–7^{(3–7)}, 1–6	1–2	2–4 (33%)	28–35 (44%)	4
3	(Norway) Casper Ruud	5–7, 5–7		7–6^{(7–4)}, 6–4	6–3, 4–6, 7–6^{(8–6)}	2–1	4–3 (57%)	40–39 (51%)	1
5	(Canada) Félix Auger-Aliassime	6–3, 6–4	6–7^{(4–7)}, 4–6		6–7^{(4–7)}, 7–6^{(7–5)}, 2–6	1–2	3–4 (43%)	37–39 (49%)	3
8	(United States) Taylor Fritz	7–6^{(7–3)}, 6–1	3–6, 6–4, 6–7^{(6–8)}	7–6^{(7–4)}, 6–7^{(5–7)}, 6–2		2–1	5–3 (63%)	47–39 (55%)	2

=== Red group ===
		(Greece) Tsitsipas	Medvedev	Rublev	(Serbia) Djokovic	RR W–L	Set W–L	Game W–L	Standings
2	(Greece) Stefanos Tsitsipas		6–3, 6–7^{(11–13)}, 7–6^{(7–1)}	6–3, 3–6, 2–6	4–6, 6–7^{(4–7)}	1–2	3–5 (38%)	40–44 (48%)	3
4	Daniil Medvedev	3–6, 7–6^{(13–11)}, 6–7^{(1–7)}		7–6^{(9–7)}, 3–6, 6–7^{(7–9)}	3–6, 7–6^{(7–5)}, 6–7^{(2–7)}	0–3	3–6 (33%)	48–57 (46%)	4
6	Andrey Rublev	3–6, 6–3, 6–2	6–7^{(7–9)}, 6–3, 7–6^{(9–7)}		4–6, 1–6	2–1	4–4 (50%)	39–39 (50%)	2
7	(Serbia) Novak Djokovic	6–4, 7–6^{(7–4)}	6–3, 6–7^{(5–7)}, 7–6^{(7–2)}	6–4, 6–1		3–0	6–1 (86%)	44–31 (59%)	1

Standings are determined by: 1. number of wins; 2. number of matches played; 3. in two-players-ties, head-to-head records; 4. in three-players-ties, percentage of sets won, then percentage of games won; 5. ATP rankings.
