= Casper Ruud =

Norwegian tennis player (born 1998)

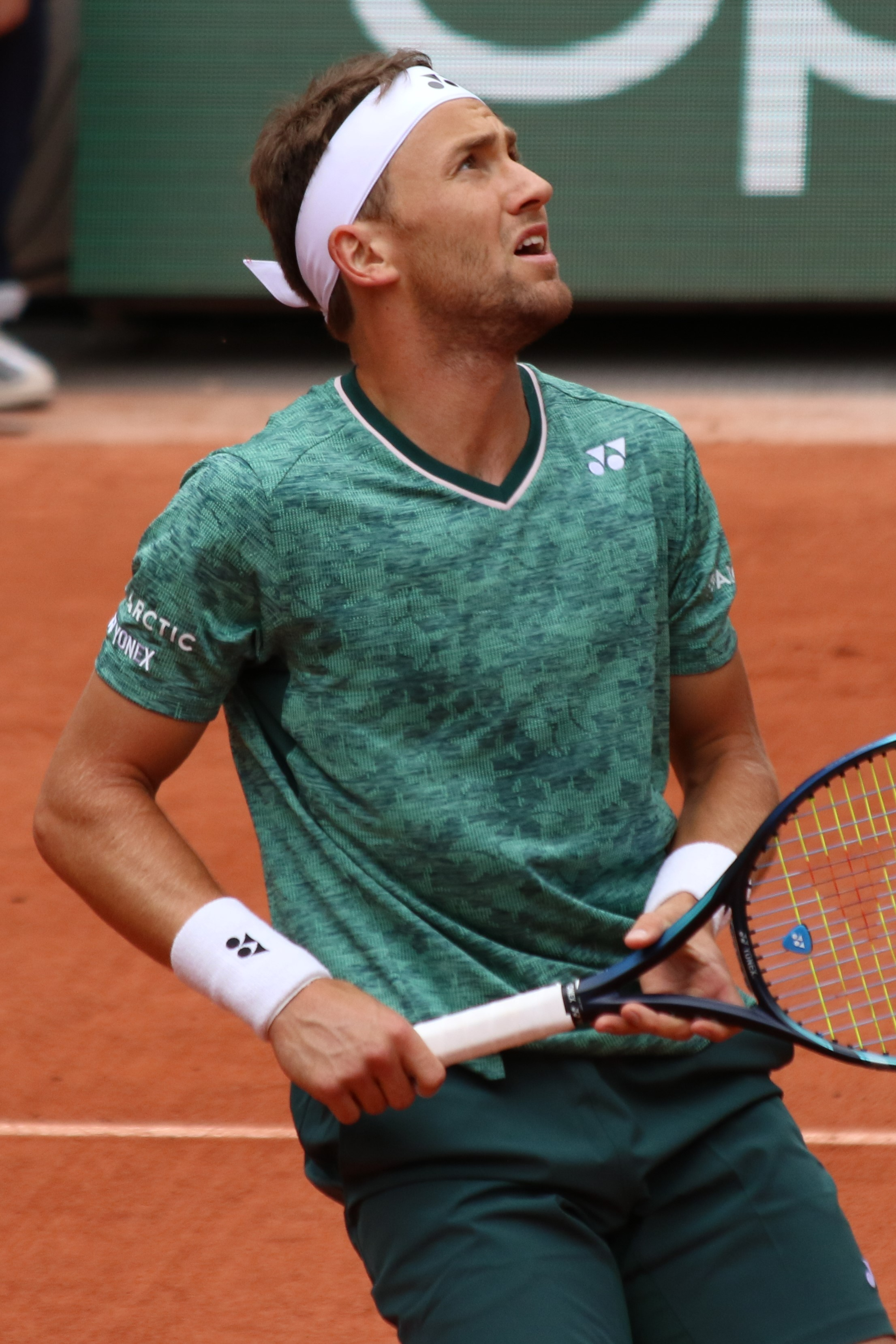
- Ruud at the 2022 French Open
- Country (sports): Norway
- Residence: Snarøya, Norway
- Born: 22 December 1998 (age 27) Oslo, Norway
- Height: 1.83 m (6 ft 0 in)
- Turned pro: 2015
- Plays: Right-handed (two-handed backhand)
- Coach: Christian Ruud; Pedro Clar
- Prize money: US $31,139,953: 18th all-time in earnings
- Official website: www.casper-ruud.com

Singles
- Career record: 333–177 (65.3%)
- Career titles: 14
- Highest ranking: No. 2 (12 September 2022)
- Current ranking: No. 18 (9 November 2026)

Grand Slam singles results
- Australian Open: 4R (2021, 2026)
- French Open: F (2022, 2023)
- Wimbledon: 2R (2022, 2023, 2024)
- US Open: F (2022)

Other tournaments
- Tour Finals: F (2022)
- Olympic Games: QF (2024)

Doubles
- Career record: 30–43
- Career titles: 0
- Highest ranking: No. 133 (12 July 2021)
- Current ranking: No. 574 (2 November 2026)

Grand Slam doubles results
- Australian Open: 2R (2021)
- French Open: 2R (2019)
- Wimbledon: QF (2021)
- US Open: 3R (2019)

Grand Slam mixed doubles results
- US Open: F (2025)
- Last updated on: 17 November 2026.

Casper Ruud (Norwegian pronunciation: [ˈkɑ̀spər ˈrʉːd]; born 22 December 1998) is a Norwegian professional tennis player. He has been ranked as high as world No. 2 in men's singles by the ATP, achieved on 12 September 2022, making him the highest-ranked Norwegian tennis player in history. Ruud has won 14 ATP Tour singles titles, including a Masters 1000 event at the 2025 Madrid Open, and finished runner-up at three singles majors (at the 2022 French Open, 2022 US Open, and 2023 French Open) and at the 2022 ATP Finals.

From September 2021 to November 2023, Ruud spent 113 consecutive weeks inside the ATP top 10. As a junior, he was ranked world No. 1. In doubles, he has a career-high ranking of world No. 133, achieved after reaching the quarterfinals of the 2021 Wimbledon Championships with André Göransson. He also reached the final of the 2025 US Open mixed doubles tournament, partnering Iga Świątek. Admired for his professional on-court demeanour, he was awarded the Stefan Edberg Sportsmanship Award in 2022.

== Career ==
=== Junior tennis ===
Ruud reached the third round of the 2015 French Open boys' singles event, losing to Corentin Denolly. He also reached the third round of the 2015 US Open boys' singles and the second round of the 2015 Wimbledon boys' singles, his best singles performances in the respective competitions in Junior Grand Slams.

In the 2015 Wimbledon Boys' Doubles, Ruud made it to the semifinals together with partner Miomir Kecmanović, before losing to eventual champions Lý Hoàng Nam and Sumit Nagal. They were eliminated in the first round of the 2015 US Open Boys' Doubles. In 2016, Ruud and Kecmanović reached the semifinals of the 2016 French Open Boys' Doubles before losing to Chung Yun-seong and Orlando Luz.

=== 2016: Junior No. 1 and professional debut ===
Ruud started the year as the world No. 1 ranked Junior player on 4 January, making him the first Norwegian to do so.

For the 2016 season, Ruud set his goals on playing Futures tournaments and start climbing the ATP rankings. In February, he played his first Futures final, which he ended up winning against Carlos Taberner in Paguera, Spain.

He has since played four more finals, winning one of them against Mikael Torpegaard in Kaarina, Finland in August.

In September, in his first ever ATP Challenger tournament, Ruud managed to win the Copa Sevilla after beating Taro Daniel in the final. By winning on his debut Ruud became the fourth-youngest to ever do so. In the tournament, he recorded his first wins over players ranked in the top 150. He knocked-out top seed Iñigo Cervantes in the quarterfinals, who at the time was ranked No. 75 in the ATP rankings. Due to his win in his Challenger debut, Ruud received a wildcard to the 2016 Chengdu Open, his first ATP World Tour 250 series tournament. Ruud lost to Viktor Troicki in the first round.

Ruud also qualified for the ITF Junior Masters, where he reached the final, losing to Hong Seong-chan.

Ruud finished 2016 with a career high ranking of No. 225 in the ATP rankings.

=== 2017: ATP 500 semifinals and top 150 ===
After impressing in 2016 and climbing the ATP ranking, Ruud lost in the third and final qualifying round of the 2017 Australian Open to Reilly Opelka. Ruud then received a wildcard into the ATP 500 event 2017 Rio Open where he defeated Rogério Dutra Silva, Roberto Carballés Baena, and Thiago Monteiro to advance to his first ATP level semifinal. This made him the youngest to reach an ATP 500 semifinal since Borna Ćorić at the 2014 Swiss Indoors. Ruud was defeated by Pablo Carreño Busta in the semifinals but reached a career-high ranking of No. 133. Ruud received a wildcard into the 2017 Miami Open, marking his first appearance at an ATP Masters 1000 tournament.

=== 2018: Major debuts ===
In 2018, Ruud qualified for his first Grand Slam at the Australian Open after going through the qualifying competition. This made him the first Norwegian to qualify for a Grand Slam main draw in 17 years. He won in the first round against Quentin Halys before losing to Diego Schwartzman in the second round. He would lose to Schwartzman again at the Rio Open. Later on in the season he showed continuous good form and reached two ATP Challenger finals in two weeks. The first one he lost against Italian Gianluigi Quinzi in Francavilla al Mare and then he lost to Pedro Sousa in the Braga Open two weeks later. A few weeks later Ruud continued his good form and qualified for the main draw of the French Open for the first time after going through the qualifiers without losing a set. In the first round he defeated Jordan Thompson to match his achievement at the Australian Open. He lost to Albert Ramos Viñolas in the second round. In July he achieved the biggest win of his career thus far when he beat defending champion and former world No. 3, David Ferrer in straight sets at the 2018 Swedish Open. Later that year Ruud qualified for the US Open for the first time, going through the qualifiers without dropping a set. He lost to Guido Pella in the first round. After struggling with finding consistency in his form after the summer, Ruud finished off the 2018 season by reaching the semifinal of three consecutive Challenger Tournaments, which brought him close to his career high ATP ranking going into a new season at No. 112.

=== 2019: Top 100 and NextGen ATP Finals ===
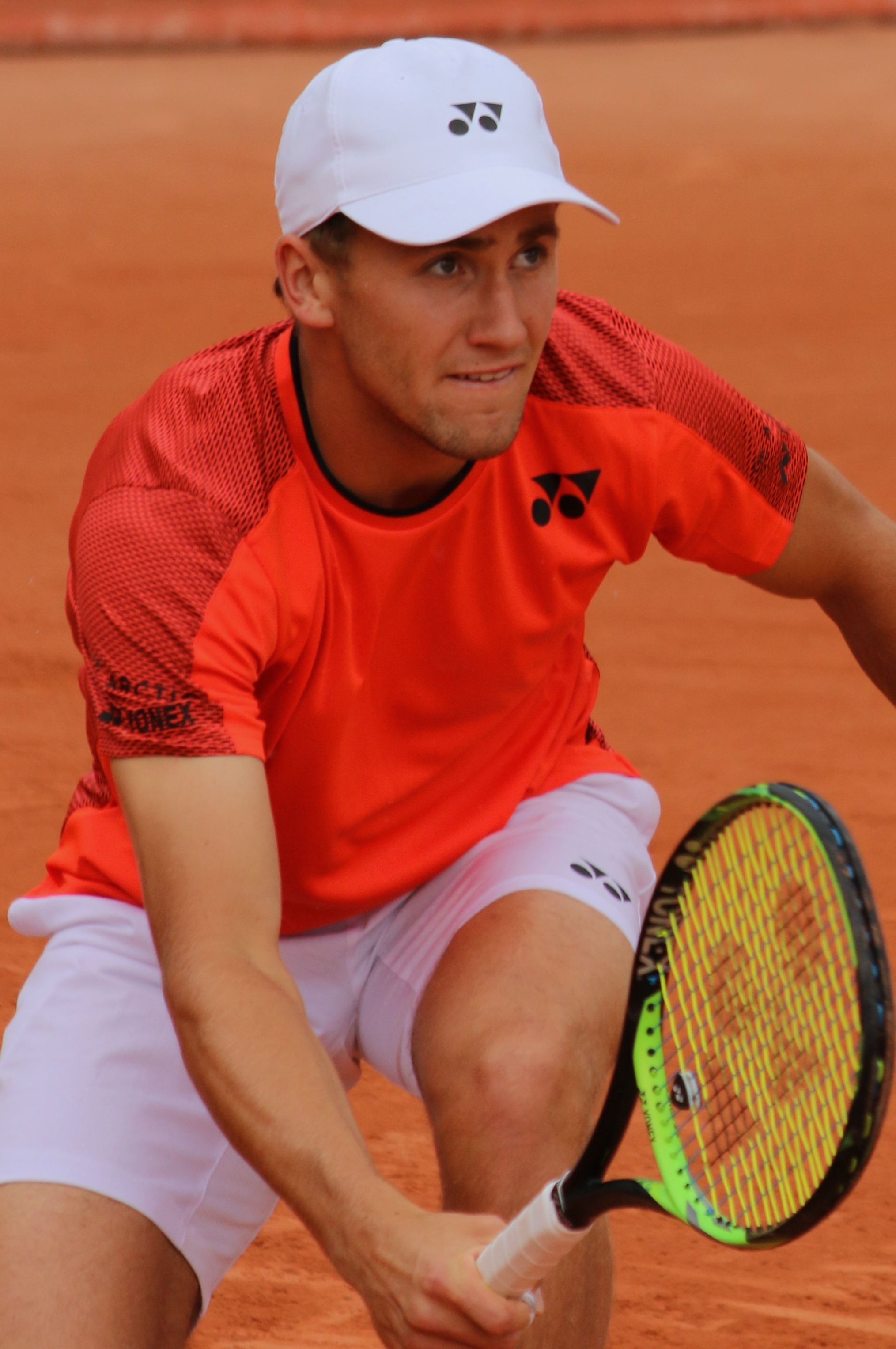
Ruud at the 2019 French Open

In the 2019 season, Ruud lost in the first qualifying round at the Australian Open, but qualified for the Rio Open, and won against Carlos Berlocq and fifth seed João Sousa before losing to Laslo Đere in two sets. The result saw him climb to a tied career high ranking of 108. The following week he reached the semifinal of the Brasil Open, beating Thiago Monteiro, top seed João Sousa and Hugo Dellien before losing to Christian Garín in two sets. The result meant that Ruud climbed inside the top 100 on the ATP rankings for the first time of his career the following week with a ranking of No. 94 becoming the first Norwegian to do so since his father, Christian Ruud, in December 1994.

In April, at the U.S. Clay Court Championships, Ruud reached his first ever ATP Tour level final. In the final he lost to Cristian Garín, though his result meant that he equaled his father Christian Ruud in reaching the final of an ATP Tour event, being the only two Norwegians to do so.

At the Italian Open, Ruud won his first match in an ATP Tour Masters 1000 tournament. After coming through the qualifiers he went on to beat Dan Evans and Nick Kyrgios before losing in the third round to Juan Martín del Potro in straight sets. At the French Open, Ruud beat Ernests Gulbis and 29th seed Matteo Berrettini before losing in straight sets against Roger Federer in the third round. Ruud also reached the second round at the doubles event alongside Miomir Kecmanović after knocking out former winners and 12th seed Ivan Dodig and Édouard Roger-Vasselin before losing in three sets to Federico Delbonis and Guillermo Durán.

In July, Ruud played his first Wimbledon Championships, losing in the first round to ninth seed John Isner. At the Kitzbühel Open Ruud made it to the semifinals after beating Pablo Carreño Busta, Matthias Bachinger and Pablo Cuevas before losing to Albert Ramos Viñolas. At the 2019 US Open, Ruud once again teamed up with Miomir Kecmanović in doubles. They made it to the third round after eliminating third seeds Raven Klaasen and Michael Venus in the second round. At the St. Petersburg Open, he made the quarterfinals before losing in three sets to Borna Ćorić. After his best season so far, Ruud qualified for the 2019 Next Generation ATP Finals where he got knocked out in the round robin.

=== 2020: Historic first ATP title and top 25 ===
At the 2020 ATP Cup Ruud led Norway to a 2–1 victory over the U.S. team in the first round-robin match by beating John Isner in three tight sets, before teaming up with Viktor Durasovic to beat Austin Krajicek and Rajeev Ram in doubles. In the second round robin singles match, Ruud beat world No. 12, Fabio Fognini, in straight sets.

In February, Ruud made his way to the final of the Argentina Open where he defeated lucky loser Pedro Sousa in the final, thus becoming the first tennis player from Norway to win an ATP Tour title and also appear in more than one ATP Tour final. At the same time he surpassed his father Christian's ranking of No. 39 on the ATP ranking, setting a new record as the highest ranked Norwegian player in ATP history with a ranking of No. 34 the following week on 17 February 2020. Two weeks after his first title, Ruud reached his second final in a month at the Chile Open but lost in three sets against Thiago Seyboth Wild.

At the US Open, he reached the third round after defeating Mackenzie McDonald in a five-set match in the first round. In the second round he faced Emil Ruusuvuori, who retired in the third set. Ruud moved to the third round but was defeated in straight sets by Matteo Berrettini.

At the Italian Open, Ruud notched four match wins, including a quarterfinal victory over top 10 player Matteo Berrettini, to reach that tournament's semifinals as the first ever Norwegian, once again surpassing the record of his father Christian Ruud who reached the quarterfinals of Monte Carlo in 1997. Casper then lost in two sets to Novak Djokovic in the semifinals. The result sent him up to a new career high of No. 30 the following week. Another semifinal at the 2020 Hamburg European Open the following week sent him up to No. 25 in the rankings. At the French Open, Ruud once again reached the third round where was then beaten by Dominic Thiem.

=== 2021: Five titles and top 10 debut ===
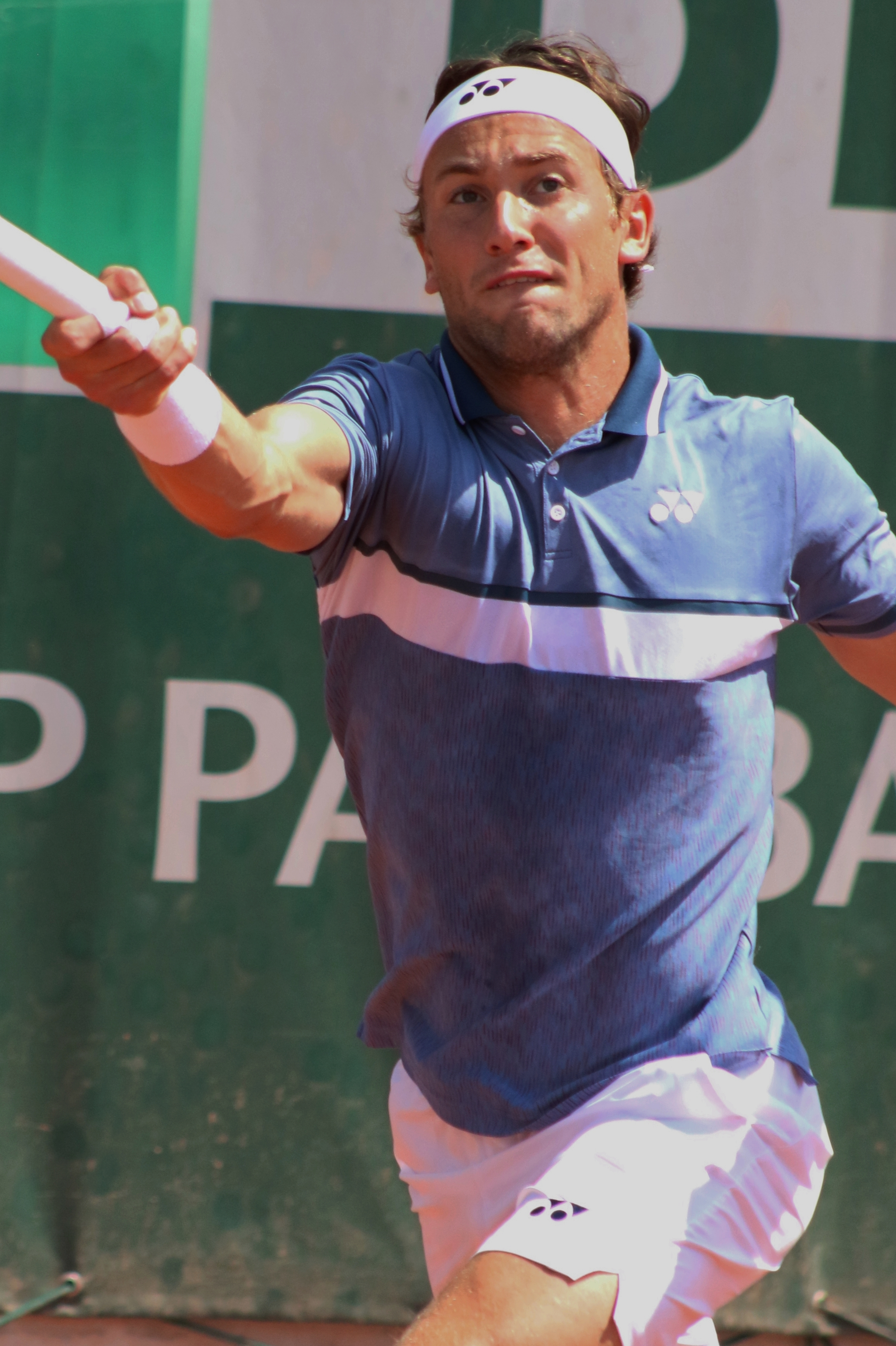
Ruud at the 2021 French Open

At the Australian Open, Ruud progressed to the fourth round in a major for the first time. He beat Jordan Thompson, Tommy Paul and Radu Albot before retiring against Andrey Rublev, after losing the first two sets. The result equalled his father's best placement at the Australian Open and a major. Ruud reentered the top 25 to a career-high ranking of No. 24, on 22 February 2021. A few weeks later, he reached the quarterfinals at Acapulco but once again withdrew due to injury before his match against Alexander Zverev started.

On his debut at the Monte-Carlo Masters, Ruud recorded his second top-10 win after beating Diego Schwartzman, in straight sets in the second round. He then defeated Pablo Carreño Busta and defending champion Fabio Fognini to reach his second Masters 1000 semifinal, where he lost to Andrey Rublev. At the BMW Open, Ruud reached the semifinals before losing in straight sets to Nikoloz Basilashvili. At the Madrid Open in another debut, Ruud recorded his first top-5 win in the third round by defeating Stefanos Tsitsipas in straight sets. He went on to record a straight sets victory in the quarterfinals over Alexander Bublik to reach his third straight ATP Masters 1000 semifinal on clay. He lost his semifinal match to Matteo Berrettini. Due to his performance in Madrid, Ruud entered the top 20 for the first time in his career, rising to a new career-high ranking of No. 16 on 10 May 2021.

At the Geneva Open, Ruud reached his fourth consecutive semifinal on the ATP Tour and then reached his first final of the year and fourth final in his career, after defeating Pablo Andújar in straight sets. He defeated Denis Shapovalov in straight sets to win his second ATP title. At Wimbledon, Ruud and his partner André Göransson made the quarterfinals of the men's doubles tournament. As a result, he climbed to a career-high in doubles of world No. 133, on 12 July 2021.

At the Swedish Open, Ruud won his second title of the year and third in total after beating Federico Coria in the final. The following week, Ruud won his third title of 2021 with victory at the Swiss Open, beating Hugo Gaston in the final. Ruud would then claim victory a week later in Kitzbühel, defeating Pedro Martínez in the final, to win his fourth title of the season and fifth of his career. As a result, Ruud moved up to a new career-high of No. 12 on 2 August 2021. He became the first ATP player since Andy Murray in October 2011 to win three titles in as many weeks. His winning streak ended at the Canada Masters when he was defeated in the quarterfinals by Stefanos Tsitsipas. Nevertheless, he reached a new career-high of world No. 11 on 16 August 2021. The following week he entered another Masters 1000 quarterfinal at the 2021 Cincinnati Masters but lost to Alexander Zverev in straight sets.

On 13 September, Ruud reached the No. 10 ranking in the world, becoming a top 10 player for the first time and the first Norwegian player to accomplish this feat. At 22, he was also the youngest player in the Top 10.

At the end of September, Ruud was selected to play the 2021 Laver Cup for team Europe. He won the first match of the tournament against Reilly Opelka in a tournament team Europe went on to win 14–1.

At the start of October, Ruud won his first ever hardcourt tournament and his fifth tour-leading tournament of the year at the San Diego Open. He defeated Andy Murray, Lorenzo Sonego, Grigor Dimitrov and in the final Cameron Norrie in two sets in 62 minutes.

Ruud began his Rolex Paris Masters run by defeating Alexander Bublik in straight sets. His third round victory over Marcos Giron confirmed Ruud's spot at the ATP Finals, where he made his debut at the year-end championships.

At the ATP Finals, Ruud reached the semifinals after losing to Novak Djokovic before beating Cameron Norrie and Andrey Rublev in the round robin. In the semifinal Ruud lost in straight sets to Daniil Medvedev.

Ruud finished the year as world No. 8 in the singles rankings.

=== 2022: Two major finals, world No. 2 ===
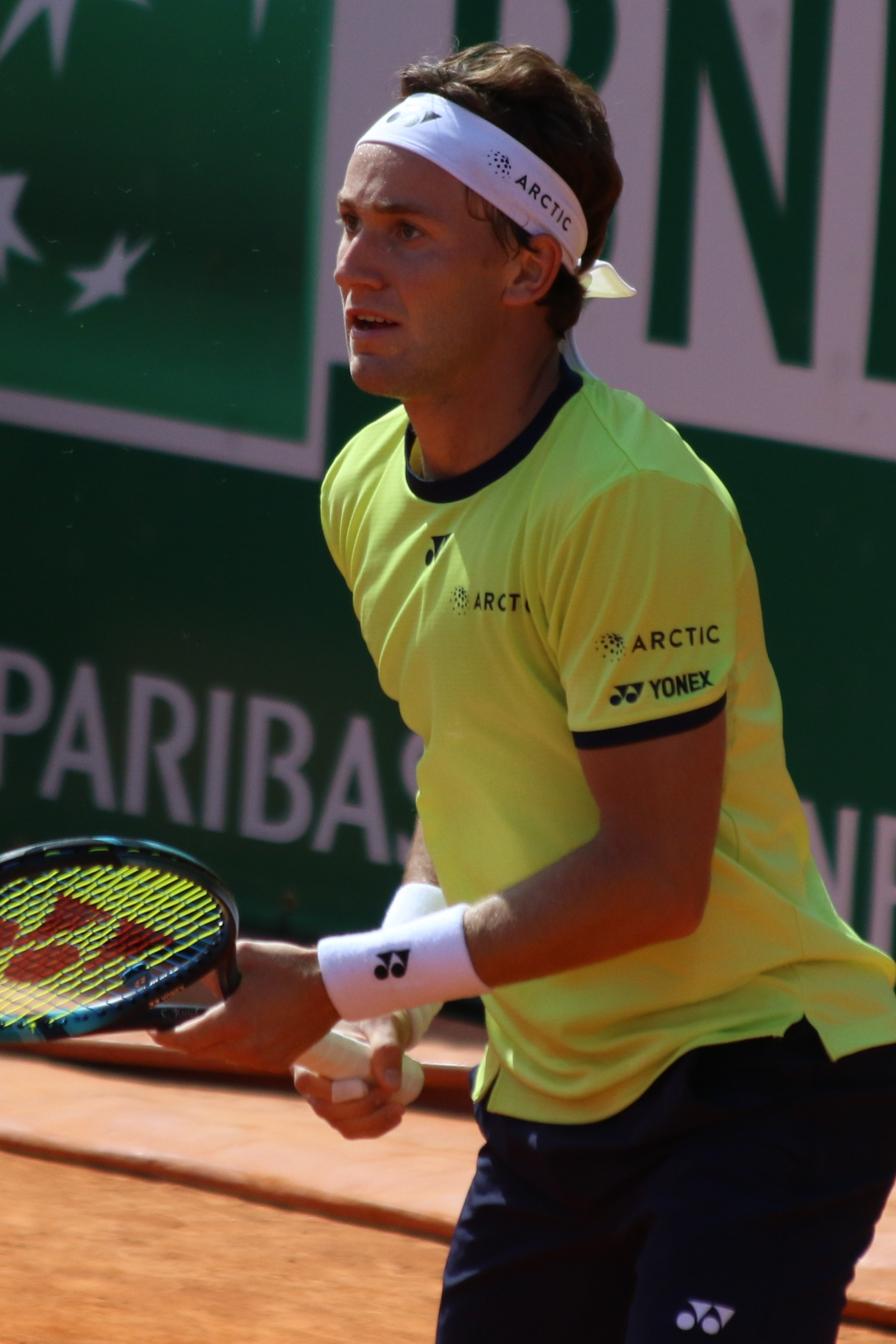
Ruud at the 2022 Monte-Carlo Masters

Ruud was drawn to play Alex Molčan on the first round in Australian Open, however, he withdrew due to an ankle injury sustained during the practice.

Shortly after his recovery, he entered the Argentina Open at which he defeated Diego Schwartzman in the final and clinched his seventh career ATP singles title.

He reached his fourth Masters 1000 semifinal at the Miami Open by defeating Henri Laaksonen, Alexander Bublik, and Cameron Norrie, and later earning his first win against world No. 4, Alexander Zverev, in the quarterfinal. Ruud then defeated Francisco Cerúndolo in the semifinals to advance to his first Masters 1000 Final. In the final he lost to 18-year-old Carlos Alcaraz in straight sets. Following this result, Ruud reached a career high ranking of No. 7 in the world on 4 April 2022.

At the Italian Open, Ruud reached the semifinals by defeating 13th seed Denis Shapovalov before losing to world No. 1, Novak Djokovic. He next defended his title at the Geneva Open, defeating João Sousa in the longest championship match of the season in both time (3 hours 4 minutes) and games (36). He became the sixth player to win multiple tour-level titles in 2022.

At the French Open, Ruud defeated Jo-Wilfried Tsonga, who was playing his last professional match, Emil Ruusuvuori, Lorenzo Sonego, and 12th seed Hubert Hurkacz to advance to his first ever major quarterfinal, becoming the first Norwegian to reach the fourth round and beyond at this major. In the first all-Scandinavian French Open quarterfinal, he defeated Holger Rune to set up a match with also first-time Roland Garros semifinalist Marin Čilić. He reached the final with a four sets win over Cilic, and became the first Norwegian man in history to reach a Grand Slam final. He fell in straight sets to Rafael Nadal, but as a result of his performance he moved to a new career-high singles ranking of world No. 6 on 6 June 2022 and to world No. 5 a week later.

At the Wimbledon Championships, he recorded his maiden win at this major defeating Albert Ramos-Vinolas and also his 150th career win.

In July, Ruud won the Swiss Open Gstaad for the second year in a row and his ninth ATP title overall, after defeating Matteo Berrettini in the final, improving his tour-level record in Switzerland to 16–0. At the Canadian Open, Ruud defeated Félix Auger-Aliassime in the quarterfinals. In the semifinals, he lost to Hubert Hurkacz in a three sets, but switched back to world No. 5. At the Cincinnati Masters, Ruud was stunned by University of Florida sophomore Ben Shelton in the second round.

At the US Open, Ruud was one of five players in the draw with a shot at the world No. 1 ranking (the others being Medvedev, Tsitsipas, Nadal and Alcaraz). He reached the fourth round by defeating Kyle Edmund, Tim van Rijthoven, and Tommy Paul; his third round match with Paul went five sets and lasted almost four and a half hours. He then defeated lucky loser Corentin Moutet, 13th seed Matteo Berrettini, the latter in straight sets, to make his second major semifinal appearance. He went on to defeat 27th seed Karen Khachanov to reach his second major final. He lost to the 3rd seed Carlos Alcaraz in the final in four sets. As a result, he climbed to a new career-high ranking of world No. 2 on 12 September 2022.

At the 2022 ATP Finals he went one step further than the previous year when he reached the final defeating Andrey Rublev and setting up a match with five-time champion Novak Djokovic. In the finals, Ruud lost to Novak Djokovic in straight sets.

Ruud also won the ATP Sportsman of the Year award for his behavior on tour.

=== 2023: French Open final ===
Ruud started off the season by participating in the inaugural 2023 United Cup leading the Norway team. He won his first match in the tournament against Thiago Monteiro but in his second match lost against Matteo Berrettini. The Norway team failed to advance to the knockout stage.

At the 2023 Australian Open, he experienced an early second round exit to Jenson Brooksby in 4 sets.

In January 2023, Ruud criticized the length of the ATP Tour calendar and said he would take around a month's break from competition after the 2023 Australian Open, with February effectively his pre-season.

During the early North American swing, he struggled to find form after losing in the second round of the Mexican Open to Taro Daniel in straight sets. At the Indian Wells Masters and Miami Masters, he lost in the second round to Cristian Garin and Botic van de Zandschulp respectively. As a result of not being able to defend his finalist points from the 2022 Miami Open, he dropped one spot in the rankings to world No. 5.

Ruud won his tenth ATP title at the clay court 2023 Estoril Open defeating home favorite and wildcard Joao Sousa, defending champion and fifth seed Sebastian Baez, Quentin Halys in the semifinal in a tough three set match, eventually emerging victorious in the third set tiebreaker and Miomir Kecmanović in the final. En route he recorded his 100th clay court win in the first round, becoming just the second man born in 1995 or later to hit that number, after Alexander Zverev. As a result, he moved back to world No. 4.

At the 2023 Monte-Carlo Masters he lost in the third round to qualifier and eventual finalist Jan-Lennard Struff. At the 2023 Madrid Open he was upset in the second round by first time qualifier Matteo Arnaldi. At the 2023 Italian Open, Ruud made the semifinals, where he lost to Holger Rune for the first time, despite being up a set and a break. At the 2023 French Open, Ruud defeated Elias Ymer, qualifier Giulio Zeppieri, Zhang Zhizhen, and Nicolás Jarry to advance to the quarterfinals for a second year in a row at this Major. In a rematch of the previous year's quarterfinal, Ruud again defeated Rune in four sets. In his third major semifinal, he again emerged victorious, defeating Alexander Zverev in straight sets. In the final, he fell to Novak Djokovic in straight sets.

Ruud, who has expressed a strong dislike for grass courts, chose not to play any grass court tournaments in the lead up to the Wimbledon Championships. After defeating qualifier Laurent Lokoli in the first round, he again experienced a disappointing early exit from the event in the second, falling to the 142nd-ranked player in the world, Liam Broady, in five sets.

At the next Major tournament, the 2023 US Open, he again lost in the second round in five sets to Zhizhen Zhang.

After losing to Francisco Cerúndolo in the second round of the Paris Masters, Ruud left the top ten for the first time since joining in 2021.

=== 2024: Barcelona champion, Olympics quarterfinal ===
At the United Cup, Ruud defeated Tallon Griekspoor and Borna Ćorić in straight sets to lead Team Norway to the quarterfinals. There, in their tie against France, he scored a third consecutive straight-set victory against Adrian Mannarino but the team was defeated in mixed doubles.

At the 2024 Los Cabos Open he defeated second seed Stefanos Tsitsipas to reach the final. At the same tournament he reached the semifinals with William Blumberg. At the next tournament the 2024 Abierto Mexicano Telcel in Acapulco he reached back-to-back finals and his 20th career one overall with a win over second seed Holger Rune.

At the 2024 Miami Open he reached the fourth round with a win over 27th seed Alejandro Davidovich Fokina, recording his 100th hardcourt win. Ruud became the only male player 25 or under to have 100 or more career wins on both hard and clay (121) and the fifth player born since 1990 to achieve the milestone, after Alexander Zverev, Dominic Thiem, Pablo Carreno Busta and Diego Schwartzman.

At the 2024 Monte-Carlo Masters, he reached the final defeating world No. 8 Hubert Hurkacz and world No. 1 Novak Djokovic en route, eventually losing in straight sets to Stefanos Tsitsipas in the final. The following week in Barcelona, seeded third, Ruud defeated Alexandre Müller, 14th seed Jordan Thompson, Matteo Arnaldi and 13th seed Tomás Martín Etcheverry, all in straight sets, to reach his 22nd final and set up a rematch with Stefanos Tsitsipas. He defeated Tsitsipas in straight sets to win the biggest title of his career and the first tournament above ATP 250 level, after seven attempts.

He lifted the trophy at the 2024 Geneva Open, becoming the first three-time champion, with a win over Tomáš Macháč in the final. It was his 12th title in his career and 11th on clay.

At the Paris Olympics he became the first Norwegian player to reach the quarterfinals stage at the Games, recording his 250th career win over Francisco Cerúndolo.

=== 2025: First ATP 1000 title, top 10 ===
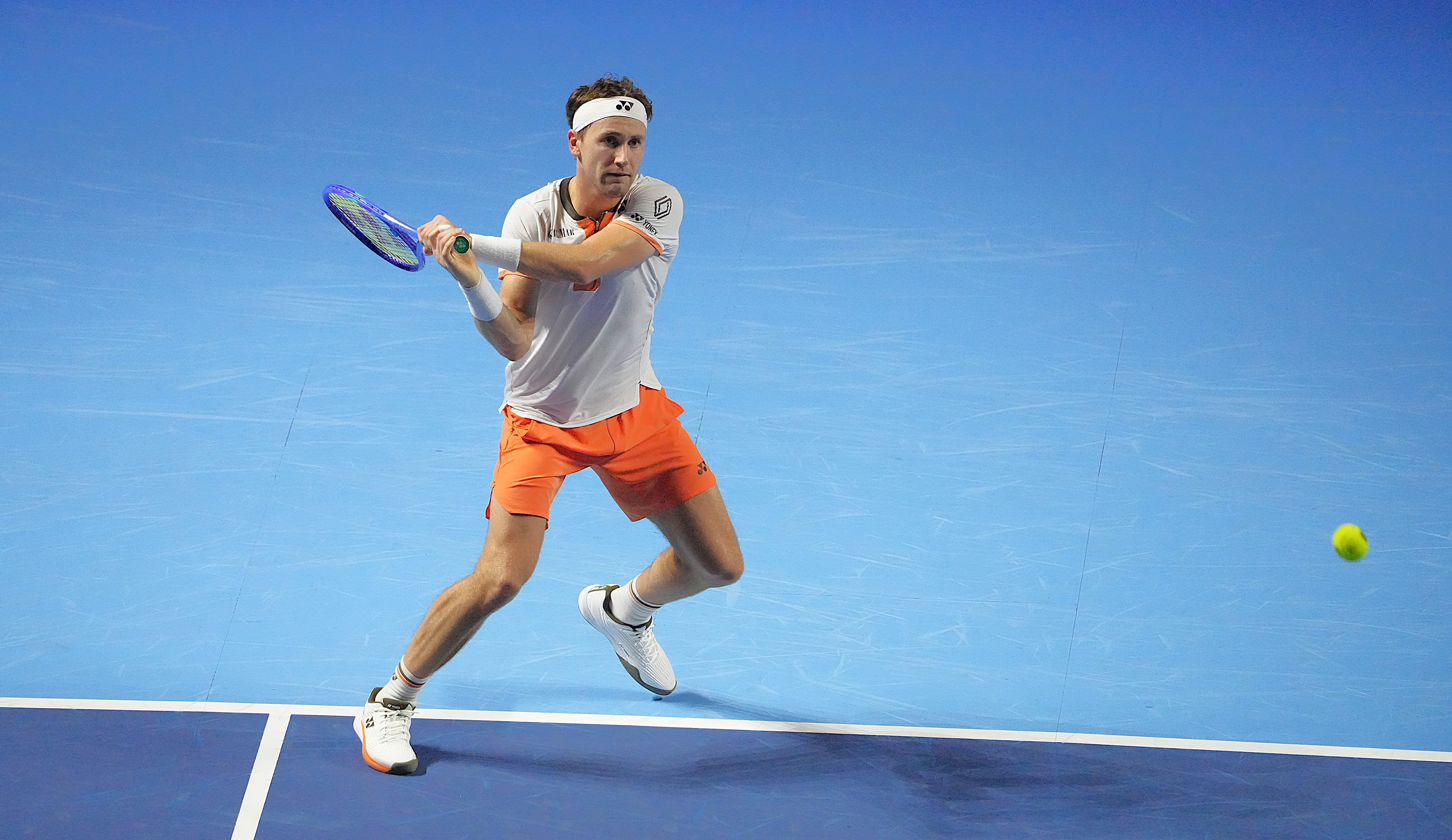
Casper Ruud reached the quarterfinals at the Swiss Indoors Basel 2025.

At the 2025 Mutua Madrid Open Ruud reached his third Masters 1000 final, defeating again 20th seed Francisco Cerúndolo in straight sets, which guaranteed a return to the top 10 in the singles rankings on 5 May 2025. He then defeated 5th seed Jack Draper in the final in 3 sets to win his first Big Title. Ruud reached the quarterfinals at the Swiss Indoors in Basel but had to retire due to injury during his match against Alejandro Davidovich Fokina. In the following week at the Paris Masters, he lost in the round of 32 to Daniel Altmaier.

=== 2026: Italian Open final ===
At the 2026 Italian Open, Ruud defeated Luciano Darderi in straight sets to reach his first final in Rome and fourth overall in Masters 1000 tournaments. With his win, he returned to the top 3 of the ATP rankings on 17 May 2026. He was defeated by Jannik Sinner in the final in straight sets.

== National representation ==
=== Davis Cup ===
He became part of the Norwegian Davis Cup team in 2015, and together with countryman Viktor Durasovic promoted Norway from Group Three Europe Zone to Group Two Europe/Africa Zone.

In the 2016 Davis Cup, Ruud and Durasovic lost 3–2 to Lithuania in the first round. In the play-offs they beat Luxembourg 3–2 to stay in the Group Two Europe/Africa Zone. Norway remained in Group Two Europe/Africa Zone in 2017 and 2018 before winning their 2019 tie against Georgia, securing them a place in the play-off for World Group I as a result of changes in the Davis Cup format. They won the play-off against Barbados and thereby qualified for World Group I.

== Playing style ==
Casper Ruud is a clay-court specialist, such that he has found his highest success on that surface and won 12 out of his 14 titles on clay. He is primarily an offensive baseliner who hits with heavy topspin. His groundstroke strength is his forehand, which he hits with heavy topspin and serves as his best weapon, especially on clay. His backhand is his weaker wing, but consistent enough to help construct points. In 2023, Ruud's backhand saw a decline in power and accuracy, but he improved on it the following season.

Ruud possesses a powerful serve that can reach up to 203 km/h (126 mph). He often utilizes it to earn more free points, frequently using a one-two punch.

Ruud is praised for his calm on-court demeanor and lack of emotional outbursts.

== Personal life ==
Ruud is the son of former professional tennis player Christian Ruud and Lele Ruud. He has two sisters, Caroline and Charlotte, and shares a passion for golf with his father. He grew up in the Snarøya district of Bærum, with Rafael Nadal as his tennis idol. He is a supporter of Liverpool FC.

Ruud has been dating his girlfriend, Maria Galligani since 2018. In November 2024, the couple announced their engagement on social media. They currently reside in Oslo. Maria attended Oslo Nye Høyskole from 2017 to 2020, where she graduated with a degree in psychology. In 2022, Maria received her master's degree in psychology from the University of Southern Denmark. She has also worked for a sports nutrition company. The couple shares a dog named Bajas since January 2021. On 11 September 2025, they announced on social media that they were expecting their first child. Their daughter was born on 30 January 2026.

=== Television and film ===
Ruud appears in the tennis docuseries Rafa Nadal Academy, which premiered on Amazon Prime Video on 16 September 2021, Break Point, which premiered on Netflix on 13 January 2023, and Carlos Alcaraz: My Way, which premiered on Netflix on 23 April 2025. He also appears in the documentary film Federer: Twelve Final Days which premiered on Amazon Prime Video on 20 June 2024.

== Career statistics ==
=== Grand Slam tournament performance timelines ===
Key
W	F	SF	QF	#R	RR	Q#	P#	DNQ	A	Z#	PO	G	S	B	NMS	NTI	P	NH

(W) winner; (F) finalist; (SF) semifinalist; (QF) quarterfinalist; (#R) rounds 4, 3, 2, 1; (RR) round-robin stage; (Q#) qualification round; (P#) preliminary round; (DNQ) did not qualify; (A) absent; (Z#) Davis/Fed Cup Zonal Group (with number indication) or (PO) play-off; (G) gold, (S) silver or (B) bronze Olympic/Paralympic medal; (NMS) not a Masters tournament; (NTI) not a Tier I tournament; (P) postponed; (NH) not held; (SR) strike rate (events won / competed); (W–L) win–loss record.
To avoid confusion and double counting, these charts are updated at the conclusion of a tournament or when the player's participation has ended.

Current through the 2026 US Open.

==== Singles ====
Tournament	2017	2018	2019	2020	2021	2022	2023	2024	2025	2026	SR	W–L	Win %
Australian Open	Q3	2R	Q1	1R	4R	A	2R	3R	2R	4R	0 / 7	11–7	61%
French Open	Q2	2R	3R	3R	3R	F	F	SF (Note: Ruud's quarterfinal opponent, Novak Djokovic, withdrew before the quarterfinals of the 2024 French Open, which does not officially count as a win.)	2R	4R	0 / 9	27–9	75%
Wimbledon	A	Q1	1R	NH	1R	2R	2R	2R	A	1R	0 / 6	3–6	33%
US Open	Q2	1R	1R	3R	2R	F	2R	4R	2R	A	0 / 8	14–8	64%
Win–loss	0–0	2–3	2–3	4–3	6–4	13–3	9–4	10–4	3–3	6–3	0 / 30	55–30	65%

==== Doubles ====
Tournament	2019	2020	2021	2022	2023	2024	2025	SR	W–L	Win %
Australian Open	A	1R	2R	A	A	A	A	0 / 2	1–2	33%
French Open	2R	1R	1R	A	A	A	A	0 / 3	1–3	25%
Wimbledon	1R	NH	QF	2R	2R	1R	A	0 / 5	5–4	56%
US Open	3R	A	1R	A	A	1R	A	0 / 3	2–3	40%
Win–loss	3–3	0–2	4–4	1–1	1–0	0–2	0–0	0 / 13	9–12	43%

=== Grand Slam tournaments ===
==== Singles: 3 (3 runner-ups) ====
Result	Year	Tournament	Surface	Opponent	Score
Loss	2022	French Open	Clay	(Spain) Rafael Nadal	3–6, 3–6, 0–6
Loss	2022	US Open	Hard	(Spain) Carlos Alcaraz	4–6, 6–2, 6–7^{(1–7)}, 3–6
Loss	2023	French Open	Clay	(Serbia) Novak Djokovic	6–7^{(1–7)}, 3–6, 5–7

==== Mixed Doubles: 1 (1 runner-up) ====
Result	Year	Tournament	Surface	Partner	Opponents	Score
Loss	2025	US Open	Hard	(Poland) Iga Świątek	(Italy) Sara Errani (Italy) Andrea Vavassori	3–6, 7–5, [6–10]

=== ATP Finals ===
==== Singles: 1 (1 runner-up) ====
Result	Year	Tournament	Surface	Opponent	Score
Loss	2022	ATP Finals, Italy	Hard (i)	(Serbia) Novak Djokovic	5–7, 3–6

=== ATP Masters 1000 ===
==== Singles: 4 (1 title, 3 runner-ups) ====
Result	Year	Tournament	Surface	Opponent	Score
Loss	2022	Miami Open	Hard	(Spain) Carlos Alcaraz	5–7, 4–6
Loss	2024	Monte-Carlo Masters	Clay	(Greece) Stefanos Tsitsipas	1–6, 4–6
Win	2025	Madrid Open	Clay	(United Kingdom) Jack Draper	7–5, 3–6, 6–4
Loss	2026	Italian Open	Clay	(Italy) Jannik Sinner	4–6, 4–6

== Awards ==
- Nominated – ATP Newcomer of the Year (2019)
- Nominated – ATP Most Improved Player of the Year (2021)
- Nominated – ATP Stefan Edberg Sportsmanship Award (2021)
- Won – ATP Stefan Edberg Sportsmanship Award (2022)
- Nominated – ATP Stefan Edberg Sportsmanship Award (2024)
