= Alexander Zverev career statistics =

Career finals
Discipline	Type	Won	Lost	Total
Singles	Grand Slam	2	4	6
Singles	ATP Finals	2	0	2
Singles	ATP 1000	7	6	13
Singles	ATP 500	6	5	11
Singles	ATP 250	8	3	11
Singles	Olympics	1	0	1
Singles	Total	26	18	44
Doubles	Grand Slam	–	–	–
Doubles	ATP Finals	–	–	–
Doubles	ATP 1000	0	1	1
Doubles	ATP 500	2	3	5
Doubles	ATP 250	1	2	3
Doubles	Olympics	–	–	–
Doubles	Total	3	6	9

This is a list of the main career statistics of German professional tennis player Alexander Zverev. All statistics are according to the ATP Tour and International Tennis Federation website.

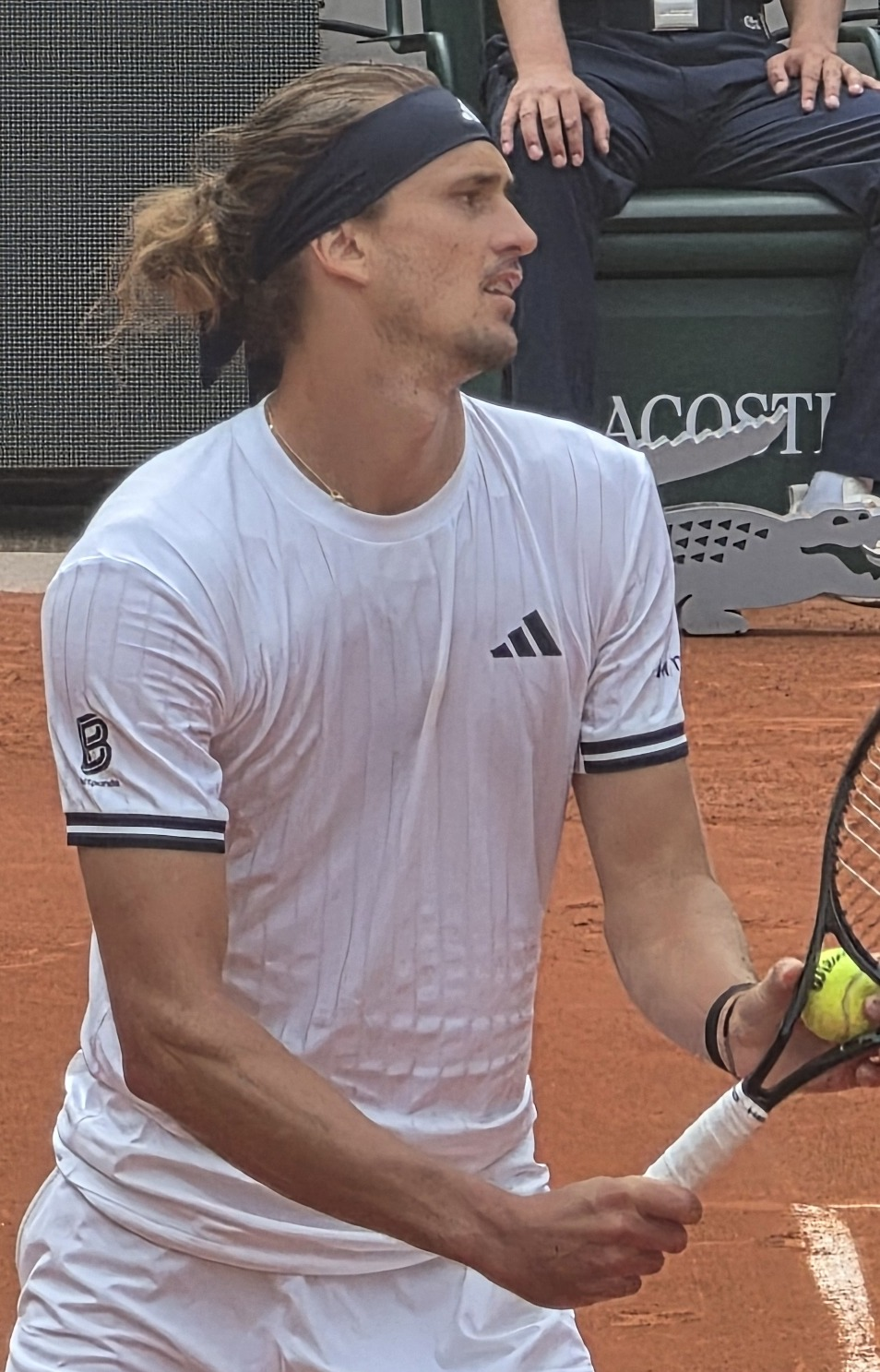
Alexander Zverev at the 2026 French Open

== Performance timelines ==
Key
W	F	SF	QF	#R	RR	Q#	P#	DNQ	A	Z#	PO	G	S	B	NMS	NTI	P	NH

(W) winner; (F) finalist; (SF) semifinalist; (QF) quarterfinalist; (#R) rounds 4, 3, 2, 1; (RR) round-robin stage; (Q#) qualification round; (P#) preliminary round; (DNQ) did not qualify; (A) absent; (Z#) Davis/Fed Cup Zonal Group (with number indication) or (PO) play-off; (G) gold, (S) silver or (B) bronze Olympic/Paralympic medal; (NMS) not a Masters tournament; (NTI) not a Tier I tournament; (P) postponed; (NH) not held; (SR) strike rate (events won / competed); (W–L) win–loss record.
To avoid confusion and double counting, these charts are updated at the conclusion of a tournament or when the player's participation has ended.

=== Singles ===
Current through the 2026 ATP Finals.

Tournament	2013	2014	2015	2016	2017	2018	2019	2020	2021	2022	2023	2024	2025	2026	SR	W–L	Win%
Grand Slam tournaments
Australian Open	A	A	Q1	1R	3R	3R	4R	SF	QF	4R	2R	SF	F	SF	0 / 11	36–11	77%
French Open	A	A	Q2	3R	1R	QF	QF	4R	SF	SF	SF	F	QF	W	1 / 11	45–10	82%
Wimbledon	A	A	2R	3R	4R	3R	1R	NH	4R	A	3R	4R	1R	F	0 / 10	22–10	69%
US Open	A	Q2	1R	2R	2R	3R	4R	F	SF	A	QF	QF	3R	W	1 / 11	35–10	78%
Win–loss	0–0	0–0	1–2	5–4	6–4	10–4	10–4	14–3	17–4	8–2	12–4	18–4	12–4	25–2	2 / 43	138–41	77%
Year-end championship
ATP Finals	did not qualify				RR	W	SF	RR	W	DNQ	RR	SF	RR	F	2 / 9	22–13	63%
National representation
Davis Cup	A	A	A	1R	1R	QF	QR	A	A	QR	QR	A	SF	QF	0 / 4	13–5	72%
Summer Olympics	not held			A	not held				G	not held		QF	not held		1 / 2	9–1	90%
ATP 1000 tournaments
Indian Wells Open	A	A	Q1	4R	3R	2R	3R	NH	QF	2R	4R	QF	2R	SF	0 / 10	17–10	63%
Miami Open	A	A	2R	2R	QF	F	2R	NH	2R	QF	2R	SF	4R	SF	0 / 11	23–11	68%
Monte-Carlo Masters	A	A	A	2R	3R	SF	3R	NH	3R	SF	3R	3R	2R	SF	0 / 10	17–10	63%
Madrid Open	A	A	A	A	QF	W	QF	NH	W	F	4R	4R	4R	F	2 / 9	30–7	81%
Italian Open	A	A	A	2R	W	F	2R	A	QF	SF	4R	W	QF	4R	2 / 10	29–8	78%
Canadian Open	A	A	A	1R	W	QF	QF	NH	A	A	2R	QF	SF	2R	1 / 8	16–7	70%
Cincinnati Open	A	Q1	1R	1R	2R	2R	2R	2R	W	A	SF	SF	SF	4R	1 / 11	18–10	64%
Shanghai Masters	A	A	A	3R	3R	SF	F	not held			2R	4R	3R	SF	0 / 8	17–8	68%
Paris Masters	A	A	A	A	2R	QF	3R	F	SF	A	3R	W	SF	2R	1 / 9	20–8	71%
Win–loss	0–0	0–0	1–2	8–7	21–7	24–8	11–9	5–2	19–5	13–5	15–9	28–7	19–9	24–9	7 / 86	187–79	70%
Career statistics
	2013	2014	2015	2016	2017	2018	2019	2020	2021	2022	2023	2024	2025	2026	SR	W–L	Win%
Tournaments	1	6	17	23	25	21	24	9	18	10	26	21	23	19	Career total: 243		
Titles	0	0	0	1	5	4	1	2	6	0	2	2	1	2	Career total: 26		
Finals	0	0	0	3	6	6	3	4	6	2	2	4	4	5	Career total: 45		
Hard win–loss	0–0	0–1	5–10	25–15	32–15	37–13	26–14	25–10	41–9	12–5	30–18	40–13	33–15	40–13	16 / 143	346–151	70%
Clay win–loss	0–1	4–5	4–3	13–7	16–4	21–4	16–8	3–1	14–4	17–5	20–7	23–6	18–7	20–4	10 / 75	189–66	74%
Grass win–loss	0–0	0–0	5–4	6–2	9–3	2–2	2–3	0–0	4–2	0–0	5–2	6–2	6–3	9–2	0 / 25	54–25	68%
Overall win–loss	0–1	4–6	14–17	44–24	57–22	60–19	44–25	28–11	59–15	29–10	55–27	69–21	57–25	69–19	26 / 243	589–242	71%
Win %	0%	40%	45%	65%	72%	76%	64%	72%	80%	74%	67%	77%	70%	78%	Career total: 71%		
Year-end ranking	809	136	83	24	4	4	7	7	3	12	7	2	3	1	$76,079,552		

=== Doubles ===
Current through the 2026 Vienna Open.

Tournament	2014	2015	2016	2017	2018	2019	2020	2021	2022	2023	2024	2025	2026	SR	W–L	Win %
Grand Slam tournaments
Australian Open	A	A	A	A	A	A	A	A	A	A	A	A	A	0 / 0	0–0	–
French Open	A	A	1R	A	A	A	A	A	A	A	A	A	A	0 / 1	0–1	0%
Wimbledon	A	A	A	A	A	A	NH	A	A	A	A	A	A	0 / 0	0–0	–
US Open	A	A	A	A	A	A	A	A	A	A	A	A	A	0 / 0	0–0	–
Win–loss	0–0	0–0	0–1	0–0	0–0	0–0	0–0	0–0	0–0	0–0	0–0	0–0	0–0	0 / 1	0–1	0%
National representation
Summer Olympics	not held		A	not held				QF	not held		A	not held		0 / 1	2–1	67%
ATP 1000 tournaments
Indian Wells Open	A	A	A	2R	1R	1R	NH	2R	SF	1R	2R	1R	1R	0 / 9	6–9	40%
Miami Open	A	A	A	2R	2R	1R	NH	2R	A	A	A	A	1R	0 / 5	3–5	38%
Monte-Carlo Masters	A	A	A	2R	2R	2R	NH	A	QF	1R	F	1R	2R	0 / 8	10–7	59%
Madrid Open	A	A	A	A	1R	1R	NH	SF	1R	2R	A	A	1R	0 / 6	4–5	44%
Italian Open	A	A	2R	2R	1R	1R	A	A	A	1R	2R	A	1R	0 / 7	3–6	33%
Canadian Open	A	A	2R	A	A	QF	NH	A	A	A	A	1R	1R	0 / 4	3–4	43%
Cincinnati Open	A	A	A	1R	A	A	1R	A	A	QF	2R	2R	2R	0 / 6	5–6	45%
Shanghai Masters	A	A	1R	A	A	A	not held			A	A	1R	1R	0 / 3	0–3	0%
Paris Masters	A	A	A	A	A	A	1R	A	A	1R	2R	1R	A	0 / 4	1–4	20%
Win–loss	0–0	0–0	2–3	4–4	2–5	3–6	0–2	5–2	5–2	3–6	8–5	1–6	2–8	0 / 52	35–49	42%
Career statistics
	2014	2015	2016	2017	2018	2019	2020	2021	2022	2023	2024	2025	2026	SR	W–L	Win%
Tournaments	3	6	8	11	11	10	5	6	5	10	7	9	13	Career total: 104		
Titles	0	0	0	1	0	1	0	0	0	0	0	0	1	Career total: 3		
Finals	0	1	1	2	2	1	0	0	0	0	1	0	1	Career total: 9		
Overall win–loss	2–3	3–6	7–8	11–9	9–11	9–9	2–5	9–6	5–5	4–10	8–8	1–9	9–12	3 / 104	79–101	44%
Win %	40%	33%	47%	55%	45%	50%	29%	60%	50%	29%	50%	10%	43%	Career total: 44%		
Year-end ranking	486	343	161	103	107	99	174	129	140	195	90	587				

== Grand Slam tournament finals ==
=== Singles: 6 (2 titles, 4 runner-ups) ===
Result	Year	Tournament	Surface	Opponent	Score
Loss	2020	US Open	Hard	(Austria) Dominic Thiem	6–2, 6–4, 4–6, 3–6, 6–7^{(6–8)}
Loss	2024	French Open	Clay	(Spain) Carlos Alcaraz	3–6, 6–2, 7–5, 1–6, 2–6
Loss	2025	Australian Open	Hard	(Italy) Jannik Sinner	3–6, 6–7^{(4–7)}, 3–6
Win	2026	French Open	Clay	(Italy) Flavio Cobolli	6–1, 4–6, 6–4, 6–7^{(5–7)}, 6–1
Loss	2026	Wimbledon	Grass	(Italy) Jannik Sinner	7–6^{(9–7)}, 6–7^{(2–7)}, 3–6, 4–6
Win	2026	US Open	Hard	(United States) Ben Shelton	6–3, 7–6^{(7–2)}, 5–7, 6–2

== Other significant finals ==
=== Year-end championships ===
==== Singles: 3 (2 titles, 1 runner-up) ====
Result	Year	Tournament	Surface	Opponent	Score
Win	2018	ATP Finals, United Kingdom	Hard (i)	(Serbia) Novak Djokovic	6–4, 6–3
Win	2021	ATP Finals, Italy (2)	Hard (i)	(Russia) Daniil Medvedev	6–4, 6–4
Loss	2026	ATP Finals, Italy	Hard (i)	(Spain) Carlos Alcaraz	2–6, 6–7^{(7–9)}

=== ATP 1000 tournaments ===
==== Singles: 13 (7 titles, 6 runner-ups) ====
Result	Year	Tournament	Surface	Opponent	Score
Win	2017	Italian Open	Clay	(Serbia) Novak Djokovic	6–4, 6–3
Win	2017	Canadian Open	Hard	(Switzerland) Roger Federer	6–3, 6–4
Loss	2018	Miami Open	Hard	(United States) John Isner	7–6^{(7–4)}, 4–6, 4–6
Win	2018	Madrid Open	Clay	(Austria) Dominic Thiem	6–4, 6–4
Loss	2018	Italian Open	Clay	(Spain) Rafael Nadal	1–6, 6–1, 3–6
Loss	2019	Shanghai Masters	Hard	(Russia) Daniil Medvedev	4–6, 1–6
Loss	2020	Paris Masters	Hard (i)	(Russia) Daniil Medvedev	7–5, 4–6, 1–6
Win	2021	Madrid Open (2)	Clay	(Italy) Matteo Berrettini	6–7^{(8–10)}, 6–4, 6–3
Win	2021	Cincinnati Open	Hard	(Russia) Andrey Rublev	6–2, 6–3
Loss	2022	Madrid Open	Clay	(Spain) Carlos Alcaraz	3–6, 1–6
Win	2024	Italian Open (2)	Clay	(Chile) Nicolás Jarry	6–4, 7–5
Win	2024	Paris Masters	Hard (i)	(France) Ugo Humbert	6–2, 6–2
Loss	2026	Madrid Open	Clay	(Italy) Jannik Sinner	1–6, 2–6

==== Doubles: 1 (runner-up) ====
Result	Year	Tournament	Surface	Partner	Opponents	Score
Loss	2024	Monte-Carlo Masters	Clay	(Brazil) Marcelo Melo	(Belgium) Sander Gillé (Belgium) Joran Vliegen	7–5, 3–6, [5–10]

=== Summer Olympics ===
==== Singles: 1 (gold medal) ====
Result	Year	Tournament	Surface	Opponent	Score
Win	2021	Tokyo Summer Olympics	Hard	(Russia) Karen Khachanov	6–3, 6–1

== ATP Tour finals ==
=== Singles: 45 (26 titles, 19 runner-ups) ===
Legend Grand Slam (2–4) Olympics (1–0) ATP Finals (2–1) ATP 1000 (7–6) ATP 500 (6–5) ATP 250 (8–3)	Finals by surface Hard (16–9) Clay (10–6) Grass (0–4)	Finals by setting Outdoor (18–15) Indoor (8–4)

Result	W–L	Date	Tournament	Tier	Surface	Opponent	Score
Loss	0–1	May 2016	Nice Open, France	ATP 250	Clay	(Austria) Dominic Thiem	4–6, 6–3, 0–6
Loss	0–2	Jun 2016	Halle Open, Germany	ATP 500	Grass	(Germany) Florian Mayer	2–6, 7–5, 3–6
Win	1–2	Sep 2016	St. Petersburg Open, Russia	ATP 250	Hard (i)	(Switzerland) Stan Wawrinka	6–2, 3–6, 7–5
Win	2–2	Feb 2017	Open Sud de France, France	ATP 250	Hard (i)	(France) Richard Gasquet	7–6^{(7–4)}, 6–3
Win	3–2	May 2017	Bavarian Championships, Germany	ATP 250	Clay	(Argentina) Guido Pella	6–4, 6–3
Win	4–2	May 2017	Italian Open, Italy	ATP 1000	Clay	(Serbia) Novak Djokovic	6–4, 6–3
Loss	4–3	Jun 2017	Halle Open, Germany	ATP 500	Grass	(Switzerland) Roger Federer	1–6, 3–6
Win	5–3	Aug 2017	Washington Open, United States	ATP 500	Hard	(South Africa) Kevin Anderson	6–4, 6–4
Win	6–3	Aug 2017	Canadian Open, Canada	ATP 1000	Hard	(Switzerland) Roger Federer	6–3, 6–4
Loss	6–4	Apr 2018	Miami Open, United States	ATP 1000	Hard	(United States) John Isner	7–6^{(7–4)}, 4–6, 4–6
Win	7–4	May 2018	Bavarian Championships, Germany (2)	ATP 250	Clay	(Germany) Philipp Kohlschreiber	6–3, 6–3
Win	8–4	May 2018	Madrid Open, Spain	ATP 1000	Clay	(Austria) Dominic Thiem	6–4, 6–4
Loss	8–5	May 2018	Italian Open, Italy	ATP 1000	Clay	(Spain) Rafael Nadal	1–6, 6–1, 3–6
Win	9–5	Aug 2018	Washington Open, United States (2)	ATP 500	Hard	(Australia) Alex de Minaur	6–2, 6–4
Win	10–5	Nov 2018	ATP Finals, United Kingdom	ATP Finals	Hard (i)	(Serbia) Novak Djokovic	6–4, 6–3
Loss	10–6	Mar 2019	Mexican Open, Mexico	ATP 500	Hard	(Australia) Nick Kyrgios	3–6, 4–6
Win	11–6	May 2019	Geneva Open, Switzerland	ATP 250	Clay	(Chile) Nicolás Jarry	6–3, 3–6, 7–6^{(10–8)}
Loss	11–7	Oct 2019	Shanghai Masters, China	ATP 1000	Hard	(Russia) Daniil Medvedev	4–6, 1–6
Loss	11–8	Sep 2020	US Open, United States	Grand Slam	Hard	(Austria) Dominic Thiem	6–2, 6–4, 4–6, 3–6, 6–7^{(6–8)}
Win	12–8	Oct 2020	Cologne Indoors, Germany	ATP 250	Hard (i)	(Canada) Félix Auger-Aliassime	6–3, 6–3
Win	13–8	Oct 2020	Cologne Championship, Germany	ATP 250	Hard (i)	(Argentina) Diego Schwartzman	6–2, 6–1
Loss	13–9	Nov 2020	Paris Masters, France	ATP 1000	Hard (i)	(Russia) Daniil Medvedev	7–5, 4–6, 1–6
Win	14–9	Mar 2021	Mexican Open, Mexico	ATP 500	Hard	(Greece) Stefanos Tsitsipas	6–4, 7–6^{(7–3)}
Win	15–9	May 2021	Madrid Open, Spain (2)	ATP 1000	Clay	(Italy) Matteo Berrettini	6–7^{(8–10)}, 6–4, 6–3
Win	16–9	Jul 2021	Summer Olympics, Japan	Olympics	Hard	(Russia) Karen Khachanov	6–3, 6–1
Win	17–9	Aug 2021	Cincinnati Open, United States	ATP 1000	Hard	(Russia) Andrey Rublev	6–2, 6–3
Win	18–9	Oct 2021	Vienna Open, Austria	ATP 500	Hard (i)	(United States) Frances Tiafoe	7–5, 6–4
Win	19–9	Nov 2021	ATP Finals, Italy (2)	ATP Finals	Hard (i)	(Russia) Daniil Medvedev	6–4, 6–4
Loss	19–10	Feb 2022	Open Sud de France, France	ATP 250	Hard (i)	(Kazakhstan) Alexander Bublik	4–6, 3–6
Loss	19–11	May 2022	Madrid Open, Spain	ATP 1000	Clay	(Spain) Carlos Alcaraz	3–6, 1–6
Win	20–11	Jul 2023	Hamburg Open, Germany	ATP 500	Clay	(Serbia) Laslo Djere	7–5, 6–3
Win	21–11	Sep 2023	Chengdu Open, China	ATP 250	Hard	Roman Safiullin	6–7^{(2–7)}, 7–6^{(7–5)}, 6–3
Win	22–11	May 2024	Italian Open, Italy (2)	ATP 1000	Clay	(Chile) Nicolás Jarry	6–4, 7–5
Loss	22–12	Jun 2024	French Open, France	Grand Slam	Clay	(Spain) Carlos Alcaraz	3–6, 6–2, 7–5, 1–6, 2–6
Loss	22–13	Jul 2024	Hamburg Open, Germany	ATP 500	Clay	(France) Arthur Fils	3–6, 6–3, 6–7^{(1–7)}
Win	23–13	Oct 2024	Paris Masters, France	ATP 1000	Hard (i)	(France) Ugo Humbert	6–2, 6–2
Loss	23–14	Jan 2025	Australian Open, Australia	Grand Slam	Hard	(Italy) Jannik Sinner	3–6, 6–7^{(4–7)}, 3–6
Win	24–14	Apr 2025	Bavarian Championships, Germany (3)	ATP 500	Clay	(United States) Ben Shelton	6–2, 6–4
Loss	24–15	Jun 2025	Stuttgart Open, Germany	ATP 250	Grass	(United States) Taylor Fritz	3–6, 6–7^{(0–7)}
Loss	24–16	Oct 2025	Vienna Open, Austria	ATP 500	Hard (i)	(Italy) Jannik Sinner	6–3, 3–6, 5–7
Loss	24–17	May 2026	Madrid Open, Spain	ATP 1000	Clay	(Italy) Jannik Sinner	1–6, 2–6
Win	25–17	Jun 2026	French Open, France	Grand Slam	Clay	(Italy) Flavio Cobolli	6–1, 4–6, 6–4, 6–7^{(5–7)}, 6–1
Loss	25–18	Jul 2026	Wimbledon, United Kingdom	Grand Slam	Grass	(Italy) Jannik Sinner	7–6^{(9–7)}, 6–7^{(2–7)}, 3–6, 4–6
Win	26–18	Sep 2026	US Open, United States	Grand Slam	Hard	(United States) Ben Shelton	6–3, 7–6^{(7–2)}, 5–7, 6–2
Loss	26–19	Nov 2026	ATP Finals, Italy	ATP Finals	Hard (i)	(Spain) Carlos Alcaraz	2–6, 6–7^{(7–9)}

=== Doubles: 9 (3 titles, 6 runner-ups) ===
Legend ATP 1000 (0–1) ATP 500 (2–3) ATP 250 (1–2)	Finals by surface Hard (3–2) Clay (0–2) Grass (0–2)	Finals by setting Outdoor (2–4) Indoor (1–2)

Result	W–L	Date	Tournament	Tier	Surface	Partner	Opponents	Score
Loss	0–1	May 2015	Bavarian Championships, Germany	ATP 250	Clay	(Germany) Mischa Zverev	(Austria) Alexander Peya (Brazil) Bruno Soares	6–4, 1–6, [5–10]
Loss	0–2	Feb 2016	Open Sud de France, France	ATP 250	Hard (i)	(Germany) Mischa Zverev	(Croatia) Mate Pavić (New Zealand) Michael Venus	5–7, 6–7^{(4–7)}
Win	1–2	Feb 2017	Open Sud de France, France	ATP 250	Hard (i)	(Germany) Mischa Zverev	(France) Fabrice Martin (Canada) Daniel Nestor	6–4, 6–7^{(3–7)}, [10–7]
Loss	1–3	Jun 2017	Halle Open, Germany	ATP 500	Grass	(Germany) Mischa Zverev	(Poland) Łukasz Kubot (Brazil) Marcelo Melo	7–5, 3–6, [8–10]
Loss	1–4	Jun 2018	Halle Open, Germany	ATP 500	Grass	(Germany) Mischa Zverev	(Poland) Łukasz Kubot (Brazil) Marcelo Melo	6–7^{(1–7)}, 4–6
Loss	1–5	Oct 2018	Swiss Indoors, Switzerland	ATP 500	Hard (i)	(Germany) Mischa Zverev	(United Kingdom) Dominic Inglot (Croatia) Franko Škugor	2–6, 5–7
Win	2–5	Mar 2019	Mexican Open, Mexico	ATP 500	Hard	(Germany) Mischa Zverev	(United States) Austin Krajicek (New Zealand) Artem Sitak	2–6, 7–6^{(7–4)}, [10–5]
Loss	2–6	Apr 2024	Monte-Carlo Masters, France	ATP 1000	Clay	(Brazil) Marcelo Melo	(Belgium) Sander Gillé (Belgium) Joran Vliegen	7–5, 3–6, [5–10]
Win	3–6	Feb 2026	Mexican Open, Mexico (2)	ATP 500	Hard	(Brazil) Marcelo Melo	(Austria) Alexander Erler (United States) Robert Galloway	6–3, 6–4

== ATP Challenger Tour finals ==
=== Singles: 2 (2 titles) ===
Finals by surface
Clay (2–0)

Result	W–L	Date	Tournament	Surface	Opponent	Score
Win	1–0	Jul 2014	Sparkassen Open, Germany	Clay	(France) Paul-Henri Mathieu	1–6, 6–1, 6–4
Win	2–0	May 2015	Heilbronner Neckarcup, Germany	Clay	(Argentina) Guido Pella	6–1, 7–6^{(9–7)}

== ITF Tour finals ==
=== Singles: 1 (runner-up) ===
Finals by surface
Clay (0–1)

Result	W–L	Date	Tournament	Surface	Opponent	Score
Loss	0–1	Nov 2012	F32 Bradenton, US	Clay	(France) Florian Reynet	0–6, 1–6

== Junior Grand Slam finals ==
=== Singles: 2 (1 title, 1 runner-up) ===
Result	Year	Tournament	Surface	Opponent	Score
Loss	2013	French Open	Clay	(Chile) Cristian Garín	4–6, 1–6
Win	2014	Australian Open	Hard	(United States) Stefan Kozlov	6–3, 6–0

== ATP ranking ==
Alexander Zverev has spent in total 4 weeks as ATP world No. 1.

Year	2012	2013	2014	2015	2016	2017	2018	2019	2020	2021	2022	2023	2024	2025	2026	2027
High	824	694	135	74	21	3	3	3	7	3	2	7	2	2	1	
Low	1537	846	827	138	85	24	5	7	7	7	12	27	7	3	4	
End	837	809	136	83	24	4	4	7	7	3	12	7	2	3	1	

Weeks in top	Total weeks
at number 1	4 *
top 5	305 *
top 10	425 *
top 20	480 *
top 50	531 *
top 100	579 *

*as of 23 November 2026.

=== ATP world No. 1 ===
==== Weeks at No. 1 by span ====
Stint	Start date	End date	Weeks	Total
1	2 November 2026	Present	4	4

==== World No. 1 ranking records ====
Category	Weeks/ Times (years)
Overall Weeks at No. 1	4
Consecutive Weeks at No. 1 highest streak	4
Year-end No. 1	1 (2026)
Year-end No. 1 consecutive streak	1 (2026)

==== Age at first and last dates No. 1 ranking was held ====
Birthdate	Age first held No. 1	Age last held No. 1
20 April 1997 (age 29)	29 years, 196 days	29 years, 216 days

== Wins over top 10 players ==
- Zverev has a 65–90 (41.9%) record against players who were, at the time the match was played, ranked in the top 10.

Season	2016	2017	2018	2019	2020	2021	2022	2023	2024	2025	2026	Total
Wins	4	7	10	3	3	12	3	4	8	4	7	65

No.	Player	Rk	Event	Surface	Rd	Score	Rk	Ref
2016
1	(Switzerland) Roger Federer	3	Halle Open, Germany	Grass	SF	7–6^{(7–4)}, 5–7, 6–3	38	
2	(Czech Republic) Tomáš Berdych	9	St. Petersburg Open, Russia	Hard (i)	SF	6–4, 6–4	27	
3	(Switzerland) Stan Wawrinka	3	St. Petersburg Open, Russia	Hard (i)	F	6–2, 3–6, 7–5	27	
4	(Austria) Dominic Thiem	10	China Open, China	Hard	1R	4–6, 6–1, 6–3	24	
2017
5	(Switzerland) Stan Wawrinka	3	Miami Open, United States	Hard	4R	4–6, 6–2, 6–1	20	
6	(Croatia) Marin Čilić	7	Madrid Open, Spain	Clay	2R	6–7^{(3–7)}, 6–3, 6–4	19	
7	(Canada) Milos Raonic	6	Italian Open, Italy	Clay	QF	7–6^{(7–4)}, 6–1	17	
8	(Serbia) Novak Djokovic	2	Italian Open, Italy	Clay	F	6–4, 6–3	17	
9	(Japan) Kei Nishikori	9	Washington Open, United States	Hard	SF	6–3, 6–4	8	
10	(Switzerland) Roger Federer	3	Canadian Open, Canada	Hard	F	6–3, 6–4	8	
11	(Croatia) Marin Čilić	5	ATP Finals, United Kingdom	Hard (i)	RR	6–4, 3–6, 6–4	3	
2018
12	(United States) John Isner	9	Madrid Open, Spain	Clay	QF	6–4, 7–5	3	
13	(Austria) Dominic Thiem	7	Madrid Open, Spain	Clay	F	6–4, 6–4	3	
14	(Belgium) David Goffin	10	Italian Open, Italy	Clay	QF	6–4, 3–6, 6–3	3	
15	(Croatia) Marin Čilić	5	Italian Open, Italy	Clay	SF	7–6^{(15–13)}, 7–5	3	
16	(United States) John Isner	10	Laver Cup, United States	Hard (i)	RR	3–6, 7–6^{(8–6)}, [10–7]	5	
17	(South Africa) Kevin Anderson	9	Laver Cup, United States	Hard (i)	RR	6–7^{(3–7)}, 7–5, [10–7]	5	
18	(Croatia) Marin Čilić	7	ATP Finals, United Kingdom	Hard (i)	RR	7–6^{(7–5)}, 7–6^{(7–1)}	5	
19	(United States) John Isner	10	ATP Finals, United Kingdom	Hard (i)	RR	7–6^{(7–5)}, 6–3	5	
20	(Switzerland) Roger Federer	3	ATP Finals, United Kingdom	Hard (i)	SF	7–5, 7–6^{(7–5)}	5	
21	(Serbia) Novak Djokovic	1	ATP Finals, United Kingdom	Hard (i)	F	6–4, 6–3	5	
2019
22	(Switzerland) Roger Federer	3	Shanghai Masters, China	Hard	QF	6–3, 6–7^{(7–9)}, 6–3	6	
23	(Spain) Rafael Nadal	1	ATP Finals, United Kingdom	Hard (i)	RR	6–2, 6–4	7	
24	(Russia) Daniil Medvedev	4	ATP Finals, United Kingdom	Hard (i)	RR	6–4, 7–6^{(7–4)}	7	
2020
25	(Argentina) Diego Schwartzman	9	Cologne Championship, Germany	Hard (i)	F	6–2, 6–1	7	
26	(Spain) Rafael Nadal	2	Paris Masters, France	Hard (i)	SF	6–4, 7–5	7	
27	(Argentina) Diego Schwartzman	9	ATP Finals, United Kingdom	Hard (i)	RR	6–3, 4–6, 6–3	7	
2021
28	(Greece) Stefanos Tsitsipas	5	Mexican Open, Mexico	Hard	F	6–4, 7–6^{(7–3)}	7	
29	(Spain) Rafael Nadal	2	Madrid Open, Spain	Clay	QF	6–4, 6–4	6	
30	(Austria) Dominic Thiem	4	Madrid Open, Spain	Clay	SF	6–3, 6–4	6	
31	(Italy) Matteo Berrettini	10	Madrid Open, Spain	Clay	F	6–7^{(8–10)}, 6–4, 6–3	6	
32	(Serbia) Novak Djokovic	1	Tokyo Olympics, Japan	Hard	SF	1–6, 6–3, 6–1	5	
33	(Greece) Stefanos Tsitsipas	3	Cincinnati Open, United States	Hard	SF	6–4, 3–6, 7–6^{(7–4)}	5	
34	(Russia) Andrey Rublev	7	Cincinnati Open, United States	Hard	F	6–2, 6–3	5	
35	(Norway) Casper Ruud	8	Paris Masters, France	Hard (i)	QF	7–5, 6–4	4	
36	(Italy) Matteo Berrettini	7	ATP Finals, Italy	Hard (i)	RR	7–6^{(9–7)}, 1–0 ret.	3	
37	(Poland) Hubert Hurkacz	9	ATP Finals, Italy	Hard (i)	RR	6–2, 6–4	3	
38	(Serbia) Novak Djokovic	1	ATP Finals, Italy	Hard (i)	SF	7–6^{(7–4)}, 4–6, 6–3	3	
39	(Russia) Daniil Medvedev	2	ATP Finals, Italy	Hard (i)	F	6–4, 6–4	3	
2022
40	(Canada) Félix Auger-Aliassime	10	Madrid Open, Spain	Clay	QF	6–3, 7–5	3	
41	(Greece) Stefanos Tsitsipas	5	Madrid Open, Spain	Clay	SF	6–4, 3–6, 6–2	3	
42	(Spain) Carlos Alcaraz	6	French Open, France	Clay	QF	6–4, 6–4, 4–6, 7–6^{(9–7)}	3	
2023
43	Daniil Medvedev	3	Cincinnati Open, United States	Hard	3R	6–4, 5–7, 6–4	17	
44	(Italy) Jannik Sinner	6	US Open, United States	Hard	4R	6–4, 3–6, 6–2, 4–6, 6–3	12	
45	(Spain) Carlos Alcaraz	2	ATP Finals, Italy	Hard (i)	RR	6–7^{(3–7)}, 6–3, 6–4	7	
46	Andrey Rublev	5	ATP Finals, Italy	Hard (i)	RR	6–4, 6–4	7	
2024
47	(Greece) Stefanos Tsitsipas	6	United Cup, Australia	Hard	QF	6–4, 6–4	7	
48	(Poland) Hubert Hurkacz	9	United Cup, Australia	Hard	F	6–7^{(3–7)}, 7–6^{(8–6)}, 6–4	7	
49	(Spain) Carlos Alcaraz	2	Australian Open, Australia	Hard	QF	6–1, 6–3, 6–7^{(2–7)}, 6–4	6	
50	(Australia) Alex de Minaur	10	Indian Wells Open, United States	Hard	4R	5–7, 6–2, 6–3	6	
51	(Norway) Casper Ruud	7	French Open, France	Clay	SF	2–6, 6–2, 6–4, 6–2	4	
52	Andrey Rublev	8	ATP Finals, Italy	Hard (i)	RR	6–4, 6–4	2	
53	(Norway) Casper Ruud	7	ATP Finals, Italy	Hard (i)	RR	7–6^{(7–3)}, 6–3	2	
54	(Spain) Carlos Alcaraz	3	ATP Finals, Italy	Hard (i)	RR	7–6^{(7–5)}, 6–4	2	
2025
55	(Serbia) Novak Djokovic	7	Australian Open, Australia	Hard	SF	7–6^{(7–5)}, 0–0 ret.	2	
56	(United States) Ben Shelton	6	Cincinnati Open, United States	Hard	QF	6–2, 6–2	3	
57	(Italy) Lorenzo Musetti	8	Vienna Open, Austria	Hard (i)	SF	6–4, 7–5	3	
58	(United States) Ben Shelton	5	ATP Finals, Italy	Hard (i)	RR	6–3, 7–6^{(8–6)}	3	
2026
59	(United States) Taylor Fritz	7	Wimbledon, United Kingdom	Grass	QF	6–4, 6–4, 6–2	3	
60	(United States) Ben Shelton	9	US Open, United States	Hard	F	6–3, 7–6^{(7–2)}, 5–7, 6–2	2	
61	(Australia) Alex de Minaur	9	Shanghai Masters, China	Hard	QF	6–4, 6–4	2	
62	(Spain) Rafael Jódar	10	ATP Finals, Italy	Hard (i)	RR	6–4, 6–4	1	
63	(United States) Ben Shelton	4	ATP Finals, Italy	Hard (i)	RR	6–2, 7–6^{(7–4)}	1	
64	(France) Arthur Fils	7	ATP Finals, Italy	Hard (i)	RR	6–4, 7–6^{(8–6)}	1	
65	Daniil Medvedev	5	ATP Finals, Italy	Hard (i)	SF	7–6^{(7–0)}, 6–4	1	

- Key: (Rk) first use, opponent rank; (Rd) round; (Rk) 2nd use, player rank; (Ref) reference; (F) final; (SF) semifinal; (QF) quarterfinal; (#R) rounds 4, 3, 2, 1; (RR) round-robin stage; (Q#) qualifying rounds or stages (3), 2, 1.

== National and international participation ==
=== Team competitions finals: 11 (8 titles, 3 runner-ups) ===
Finals by tournaments Olympic Games (1–0) United Cup (1–0) Laver Cup (6–1) Hopman Cup (0–2)	Finals by teams Germany (2–2) Europe (6–1)

Result	Date	Tournament	Surface	Team	Partner(s)	Opponent team	Opponent player(s)	Score
Win	Sep 2017	Laver Cup	Hard (i)	Team Europe	Roger Federer; Rafael Nadal; Dominic Thiem; Marin Čilić; Tomáš Berdych	Team World	Sam Querrey; John Isner; Nick Kyrgios; Jack Sock; Denis Shapovalov; Frances Tiafoe	15–9
Loss	Jan 2018	Hopman Cup	Hard (i)	Germany	Angelique Kerber	Switzerland	Roger Federer; Belinda Bencic	1–2
Win	Sep 2018	Laver Cup	Hard (i)	Team Europe	Roger Federer; Novak Djokovic; Grigor Dimitrov; David Goffin; Kyle Edmund	Team World	Kevin Anderson; John Isner; Diego Schwartzman; Jack Sock; Nick Kyrgios; Frances Tiafoe	13–8
Loss	Jan 2019	Hopman Cup	Hard (i)	Germany	Angelique Kerber	Switzerland	Roger Federer; Belinda Bencic	1–2
Win	Sep 2019	Laver Cup	Hard (i)	Team Europe	Rafael Nadal; Roger Federer; Dominic Thiem; Stefanos Tsitsipas; Fabio Fognini	Team World	John Isner; Milos Raonic; Nick Kyrgios; Taylor Fritz; Denis Shapovalov; Jack Sock	13–11
Win	Aug 2021	Olympic Games	Hard	Germany	–	ROC	Karen Khachanov	2–0
Win	Sep 2021	Laver Cup	Hard (i)	Team Europe	Daniil Medvedev; Stefanos Tsitsipas; Andrey Rublev; Matteo Berrettini; Casper Ruud	Team World	Félix Auger-Aliassime; Denis Shapovalov; Diego Schwartzman; Reilly Opelka; John Isner; Nick Kyrgios	14–1
Win	Jan 2024	United Cup	Hard	Germany	Angelique Kerber; Laura Siegemund	Poland	Hubert Hurkacz; Iga Świątek	2–1
Win	Sep 2024	Laver Cup	Hard (i)	Team Europe	Carlos Alcaraz; Daniil Medvedev; Casper Ruud; Grigor Dimitrov; Stefanos Tsitsipas	Team World	Taylor Fritz; Frances Tiafoe; Ben Shelton; Alejandro Tabilo; Francisco Cerúndolo; Thanasi Kokkinakis	13–11
Loss	Sep 2025	Laver Cup	Hard (i)	Team Europe	Carlos Alcaraz; Holger Rune; Casper Ruud; Jakub Menšík; Flavio Cobolli	Team World	Taylor Fritz; Alex de Minaur; Francisco Cerúndolo; Alex Michelsen; João Fonseca; Reilly Opelka	9–15
Win	Sep 2026	Laver Cup	Hard (i)	Team Europe	Carlos Alcaraz; Flavio Cobolli; Rafael Jódar; Jakub Menšík; Casper Ruud	Team World	Alex de Minaur; Taylor Fritz; Learner Tien; Brandon Nakashima; Alexander Bublik; Francisco Cerúndolo	13–5

=== Olympic Games (11–3) ===
Matches by type Singles (9–1) Doubles (2–1) MIxed doubles (0–1)	Matches by medal finals Gold medal final (1–0)

Venue	Surface	Match type	Round	Opponent player(s)	W/L	Match score
2021
Tokyo	Hard	Singles	1R	(Chinese Taipei) Lu Yen-hsun	Win	6–1, 6–3
Tokyo	Hard	Singles	2R	(Colombia) Daniel Elahi Galán	Win	6–2, 6–2
Tokyo	Hard	Singles	3R	(Georgia (country)) Nikoloz Basilashvili	Win	6–4, 7–6^{(7–5)}
Tokyo	Hard	Singles	QF	(France) Jérémy Chardy	Win	6–4, 6–1
Tokyo	Hard	Singles	SF	(Serbia) Novak Djokovic	Win	1–6, 6–3, 6–1
Tokyo	Hard	Singles	G	(Russia) Karen Khachanov	Win	6–3, 6–1
Tokyo	Hard	Doubles (w/ J-L Struff)	1R	(Poland) H Hurkacz / Ł Kubot	Win	6–2, 7–6^{(7–5)}
Tokyo	Hard	Doubles (w/ J-L Struff)	2R	(France) J Chardy / G Monfils	Win	6–4, 7–5
Tokyo	Hard	Doubles (w/ J-L Struff)	QF	(United States) A Krajicek / T Sandgren	Loss	3–6, 6–7^{(4–7)}
2024
Paris	Clay	Singles	1R	(Spain) Jaume Munar	Win	6–2, 6–2
Paris	Clay	Singles	2R	(Czech Republic) Tomáš Macháč	Win	6–3, 7–5
Paris	Clay	Singles	3R	(Australia) Alexei Popyrin	Win	7–5, 6–3
Paris	Clay	Singles	QF	(Italy) Lorenzo Musetti	Loss	5–7, 5–7
Paris	Clay	Mixed doubles (w/ L Siegemund)	1R	(Czech Republic) K Siniaková / T Macháč	Loss	4–6, 5–7

=== Davis Cup (13–6) ===
Group membership World Group / Finals (6–5) Qualifying round (7–1)	Matches by type Singles (13–5) Doubles (0–1)	Matches by surface Hard (10–5) Clay (3–1)	Matches by venue Germany (6–5) Away (5–1) Neutral (2–0)

Date	Venue	Surface	Rd	Opponent nation	Score	Match	Opponent player(s)	W/L	Match score
2016
Mar 2016	Hanover	Hard (i)	1R	Czech Republic	2–3	Singles 2	Tomáš Berdych	Loss	6–7^{(6–8)}, 6–1, 6–4, 6–7^{(5–7)}, 4–6
Mar 2016	Hanover	Hard (i)	1R	Czech Republic	2–3	Singles 5	Lukáš Rosol	Loss	2–6, 3–6, 1–6
2017
Feb 2017	Frankfurt	Hard (i)	1R	Belgium	1–4	Singles 2	Arthur de Greef	Win	6–3, 6–3, 6–4
Feb 2017	Frankfurt	Hard (i)	1R	Belgium	1–4	Doubles (w/ Mischa Zverev)	Ruben Bemelmans / Joris De Loore	Loss	3–6, 6–7^{(4–7)}, 6–4, 6–4, 3–6
Feb 2017	Frankfurt	Hard (i)	1R	Belgium	1–4	Singles 4	Steve Darcis	Loss	6–2, 4–6, 4–6, 6–7^{(8–10)}
2018
Feb 2018	Brisbane	Hard	1R	Australia	3–1	Singles 1	Alex de Minaur	Win	7–5, 4–6, 4–6, 6–3, 7–6^{(7–4)}
Feb 2018	Brisbane	Hard	1R	Australia	3–1	Singles 4	Nick Kyrgios	Win	6–2, 7–6^{(7–3)}, 6–2
Apr 2018	Valencia	Clay	QF	Spain	2–3	Singles 1	David Ferrer	Win	6–4, 6–2, 6–2
Apr 2018	Valencia	Clay	QF	Spain	2–3	Singles 4	Rafael Nadal	Loss	1–6, 4–6, 4–6
2019
Feb 2019	Frankfurt	Hard (i)	QR	Hungary	5–0	Singles 2	Péter Nagy	Win	6–2, 6–2
Feb 2019	Frankfurt	Hard (i)	QR	Hungary	5–0	Singles 4	Gábor Borsos	Win	6–3, 6–4
2022
Mar 2022	Rio de Janeiro	Clay	QR	Brazil	3–1	Singles 1	Thiago Seyboth Wild	Win	6–4, 6–2
Mar 2022	Rio de Janeiro	Clay	QR	Brazil	3–1	Singles 4	Thiago Monteiro	Win	6–1, 7–5
2023
Feb 2023	Trier	Hard (i)	QR	Switzerland	2–3	Singles 2	Stan Wawrinka	Win	6–4, 6–1
Feb 2023	Trier	Hard (i)	QR	Switzerland	2–3	Singles 4	Marc-Andrea Hüsler	Loss	2–6, 6–7^{(4–7)}
2025
Nov 2025	Bologna	Hard (i)	QF	Argentina	2–1	Singles 2	Francisco Cerúndolo	Win	6–4, 7–6^{(7–3)}
Nov 2025	Bologna	Hard (i)	SF	Spain	1–2	Singles 2	Jaume Munar	Win	7–6^{(7–2)}, 7–6^{(7–5)}
2026
Sep 2026	Halle	Hard (i)	Q2	Croatia	3–1	Singles 1	Matej Dodig	Win	6–4, 7–6^{(7–3)}
Sep 2026	Halle	Hard (i)	Q2	Croatia	3–1	Singles 4	Dino Prižmić	Win	6–2, 6–4

=== United Cup (14–6) ===
Matches by type
Singles (7–4)
Mixed doubles (7–2)

Venue	Surface	Rd	Opponent nation	Score	Match type	Opponent player(s)	W/L	Match score
2023
Sydney	Hard	RR	Czech Republic	2–3	Singles	Jiří Lehečka	Loss	4–6, 2–6
Sydney	Hard	RR	Czech Republic	2–3	Mixed doubles (w/ L Siegemund)	M Bouzková / J Lehečka	Win	6–4, 7–6^{(7–1)}
Sydney	Hard	RR	United States	0–5	Singles	Taylor Fritz	Loss	1–6, 4–6
2024
Sydney	Hard	RR	Italy	2–1	Singles	Lorenzo Sonego	Win	6–7^{(5–7)}, 6–3, 6–4
Sydney	Hard	RR	Italy	2–1	Mixed doubles (w/ A Kerber)	A Moratelli / L Sonego	Win	6–3, 6–0
Sydney	Hard	RR	France	1–2	Singles	Adrian Mannarino	Win	4–6, 6–4, 6–3
Sydney	Hard	RR	France	1–2	Mixed doubles (w/ A Kerber)	C Garcia / É Roger-Vasselin	Loss	6–7^{(4–7)}, 6–2, [10–12]
Sydney	Hard	QF	Greece	2–1	Singles	Stefanos Tsitsipas	Win	6–4, 6–4
Sydney	Hard	QF	Greece	2–1	Mixed doubles (w/ L Siegemund)	M Sakkari / Pe Tsitsipas	Win	6–3, 6–3
Sydney	Hard	SF	Australia	2–1	Singles	Alex de Minaur	Loss	7–5, 3–6, 4–6
Sydney	Hard	SF	Australia	2–1	Mixed doubles (w/ L Siegemund)	S Hunter / M Ebden	Win	7–6^{(7–2)}, 6–7^{(2–7)}, [15–13]
Sydney	Hard	W	Poland	2–1	Singles	Hubert Hurkacz	Win	6–7^{(3–7)}, 7–6^{(8–6)}, 6–4
Sydney	Hard	W	Poland	2–1	Mixed doubles (w/ L Siegemund)	I Świątek / H Hurkacz	Win	6–4, 5–7, [10–4]
2025
Perth	Hard	RR	Brazil	3–0	Singles	Thiago Monteiro	Win	6–4, 6–4
Perth	Hard	RR	China	2–1	Singles	Zhang Zhizhen	Win	2–6, 6–0, 6–2
Perth	Hard	RR	China	2–1	Mixed doubles (w/ L Siegemund)	S Zhang / Z Zhang	Win	6–2, 7–6^{(7–3)}
2026
Sydney	Hard	RR	Netherlands	3–0	Singles	Tallon Griekspoor	Win	7–5, 6–0
Sydney	Hard	RR	Netherlands	3–0	Mixed doubles (w/ L Siegemund)	D Schuurs / T Griekspoor	Win	6–3, 6–2
Sydney	Hard	RR	Poland	0–3	Singles	Hubert Hurkacz	Loss	3–6, 4–6
Sydney	Hard	RR	Poland	0–3	Mixed doubles (w/ L Siegemund)	K Kawa / J Zieliński	Loss	6–7^{(6–8)}, 3–6

=== Laver Cup (11–8) ===
Matches by type Singles (8–5) Doubles (3–3)	Matches by points Day 1, 1 point (2–2) Day 2, 2 points (3–4) Day 3, 3 points (6–2)	Matches by venue Europe (7–4) Rest of world (4–4)

Venue	Score	Day	Match type	Opponent player(s)	W/L	Match score
2017
Prague	15–9	1 (1 point)	Singles	(Canada) Denis Shapovalov	Win	7–6^{(7–3)}, 7–6^{(7–5)}
Prague	15–9	3 (3 points)	Singles	(United States) Sam Querrey	Win	6–4, 6–4
2018
Chicago	13–8	2 (2 points)	Singles	(United States) John Isner	Win	3–6, 7–6^{(8–6)}, [10–7]
Chicago	13–8	3 (3 points)	Doubles (w/ (Switzerland) R Federer)	(United States) J Isner / (United States) J Sock	Loss	6–4, 6–7^{(2–7)}, [9–11]
Chicago	13–8	3 (3 points)	Singles	(South Africa) Kevin Anderson	Win	6–7^{(3–7)}, 7–5, [10–7]
2019
Geneva	13–11	1 (1 point)	Doubles (w/ (Switzerland) R Federer)	(Canada) D Shapovalov / (United States) J Sock	Win	6–3, 7–5
Geneva	13–11	2 (2 points)	Singles	(United States) John Isner	Loss	7–6^{(7–2)}, 4–6, [1–10]
Geneva	13–11	3 (3 points)	Singles	(Canada) Milos Raonic	Win	6–4, 3–6, [10–4]
2021
Boston	14–1	1 (1 point)	Doubles (w/ (Italy) M Berrettini)	(United States) J Isner / (Canada) D Shapovalov	Loss	6–4, 6–7^{(2–7)}, [1–10]
Boston	14–1	2 (2 points)	Singles	(United States) John Isner	Win	7–6^{(7–5)}, 6–7^{(6–8)}, [10–5]
Boston	14–1	3 (3 points)	Doubles (w/ (Russia) A Rublev)	(United States) R Opelka / (Canada) D Shapovalov	Win	6–2, 6–7^{(4–7)}, [10–3]
2024
Berlin	13–11	1 (1 point)	Doubles (w/ (Spain) C Alcaraz)	(United States) T Fritz / (United States) B Shelton	Loss	6–7^{(5–7)}, 4–6
Berlin	13–11	2 (2 points)	Singles	(United States) Taylor Fritz	Loss	4–6, 5–7
Berlin	13–11	3 (3 points)	Singles	(United States) Frances Tiafoe	Win	6–7^{(5–7)}, 7–5, [10–5]
2025
San Francisco	9–15	2 (2 points)	Singles	(Australia) Alex de Minaur	Loss	1–6, 4–6
San Francisco	9–15	3 (3 points)	Singles	(United States) Taylor Fritz	Loss	3–6, 6–7^{(4–7)}
2026
London	13–5	2 (2 points)	Singles	(Australia) Alex de Minaur	Loss	6–2, 6–7^{(5–7)}, [9–11]
London	13–5	2 (2 points)	Doubles (w/ (Norway) C Ruud)	(Kazakhstan) A Bublik / (United States) B Nakashima	Win	6–4, 7–6^{(9–7)}
London	13–5	3 (3 points)	Singles	(United States) Learner Tien	Win	7–6^{(7–3)}, 6–3

=== ATP Cup (4–7) ===
Matches by type
Singles (3–6)
Doubles (1–1)

Venue	Surface	Rd	Opponent nation	Score	Match type	Opponent player(s)	W/L	Match score
2020
Brisbane	Hard	RR	Australia	0–3	Singles	Alex de Minaur	Loss	6–4, 6–7^{(4–7)}, 2–6
Brisbane	Hard	RR	Greece	2–1	Singles	Stefanos Tsitsipas	Loss	1–6, 4–6
Brisbane	Hard	RR	Canada	1–2	Singles	Denis Shapovalov	Loss	2–6, 2–6
2021
Melbourne	Hard	RR	Canada	2–1	Singles	Denis Shapovalov	Win	6–7^{(4–7)}, 6–3, 7–6^{(7–4)}
Melbourne	Hard	RR	Serbia	2–1	Singles	Novak Djokovic	Loss	7–6^{(7–4)}, 2–6, 5–7
Melbourne	Hard	RR	Serbia	2–1	Doubles (w/ J-L Struff)	N Djokovic / N Ćaćić	Win	7–6^{(7–4)}, 5–7, [10–7]
Melbourne	Hard	SF	Russia	1–2	Singles	Daniil Medvedev	Loss	6–3, 3–6, 5–7
2022
Sydney	Hard	RR	Great Britain	1–2	Singles	Cameron Norrie	Win	7–6^{(7–2)}, 6–1
Sydney	Hard	RR	Great Britain	1–2	Doubles (w/ K Krawietz)	D Evans / J Murray	Loss	3–6, 4–6
Sydney	Hard	RR	United States	2–1	Singles	Taylor Fritz	Win	6–4, 6–4
Sydney	Hard	RR	Canada	1–2	Singles	Félix Auger-Aliassime	Loss	4–6, 6–4, 3–6

=== Hopman Cup (13–15) ===
Matches by type
Singles (7–7)
Mixed doubles (6–8)

Venue	Surface	Rd	Opponent nation	Score	Match type	Opponent player(s)	W/L	Match score
2016
Perth	Hard (i)	RR	Australia	0–3	Singles	Nick Kyrgios	Loss	6–4, 1–6, 4–6
Perth	Hard (i)	RR	Australia	0–3	Mixed doubles (w/ S Lisicki)	D Saville / N Kyrgios	Loss	1–6, 6–4, [7–10]
Perth	Hard (i)	RR	France	2–1	Singles	Kenny de Schepper	Win	6–2, 6–2
Perth	Hard (i)	RR	France	2–1	Mixed doubles (w/ S Lisicki)	C Garcia / K de Schepper	Win	6–4, 6–7^{(6–8)}, [10–6]
Perth	Hard (i)	RR	Great Britain	0–3	Singles	Andy Murray	Loss	3–6, 4–6
Perth	Hard (i)	RR	Great Britain	0–3	Mixed doubles (w/ S Lisicki)	H Watson / A Murray	Loss	3–6, 4–6
2017
Perth	Hard (i)	RR	France	1–2	Singles	Richard Gasquet	Loss	5–7, 3–6
Perth	Hard (i)	RR	France	1–2	Mixed doubles (w/ A Petkovic)	K Mladenovic / R Gasquet	Loss	2–4, 1–4
Perth	Hard (i)	RR	Switzerland	1–2	Singles	Roger Federer	Win	7–6^{(7–1)}, 6–7^{(4–7)}, 7–6^{(7–4)}
Perth	Hard (i)	RR	Switzerland	1–2	Mixed doubles (w/ A Petkovic)	B Bencic / R Federer	Loss	1–4, 2–4
Perth	Hard (i)	RR	Great Britain	2–1	Singles	Dan Evans	Win	6–4, 6–3
Perth	Hard (i)	RR	Great Britain	2–1	Mixed doubles (w/ A Petkovic)	H Watson / D Evans	Win	4–2, 4–2
2018
Perth	Hard (i)	RR	Belgium	2–1	Singles	David Goffin	Loss	3–6, 3–6
Perth	Hard (i)	RR	Belgium	2–1	Mixed doubles (w/ A Kerber)	E Mertens / D Goffin	Win	4–2, 4–3^{(5–2)}
Perth	Hard (i)	RR	Canada	3–0	Singles	Vasek Pospisil	Win	6–4, 6–2
Perth	Hard (i)	RR	Canada	3–0	Mixed doubles (w/ A Kerber)	E Bouchard / V Pospisil	Win	4–3^{(5–2)}, 4–3^{(5–2)}
Perth	Hard (i)	RR	Australia	2–1	Singles	Thanasi Kokkinakis	Loss	7–5, 6–7^{(4–7)}, 4–6
Perth	Hard (i)	RR	Australia	2–1	Mixed doubles (w/ A Kerber)	D Saville / T Kokkinakis	Win	4–1, 1–4, 4–3^{(5–3)}
Perth	Hard (i)	F	Switzerland	1–2	Singles	Roger Federer	Loss	7–6^{(7–4)}, 0–6, 2–6
Perth	Hard (i)	F	Switzerland	1–2	Mixed doubles (w/ A Kerber)	B Bencic / R Federer	Loss	3–4^{(3–5)}, 2–4
2019
Perth	Hard (i)	RR	Spain	3–0	Singles	David Ferrer	Win	6–4, 4–6, 7–6^{(7–0)}
Perth	Hard (i)	RR	Spain	3–0	Mixed doubles (w/ A Kerber)	G Muguruza / D Ferrer	Win	4–2, 4–3^{(5–3)}
Perth	Hard (i)	RR	France	2–1	Singles	Lucas Pouille	Win	6–3, 6–7^{(8–10)}, 6–2
Perth	Hard (i)	RR	France	2–1	Mixed doubles (w/ A Kerber)	A Cornet / L Pouille	Loss	3–4^{(4–5)}, 3–4^{(3–5)}
Perth	Hard (i)	RR	Australia	2–1	Singles	Matthew Ebden	Win	6–4, 6–3
Perth	Hard (i)	RR	Australia	2–1	Mixed doubles (w/ A Kerber)	A Barty / M Ebden	Loss	0–4, 3–4^{(1–5)}
Perth	Hard (i)	F	Switzerland	1–2	Singles	Roger Federer	Loss	4–6, 2–6
Perth	Hard (i)	F	Switzerland	1–2	Mixed doubles (w/ A Kerber)	B Bencic / R Federer	Loss	0–4, 4–1, 3–4^{(4–5)}

== Grand Slam tournament seedings ==
The tournaments won by Zverev are in bold. The advances into finals are in italics.
Not seeded at all, or not seeded inside the top 10 Seeded 10–4 Seeded no. 3 Seeded no. 2 Seeded no. 1

Year	Australian Open	French Open	Wimbledon	US Open
2014	did not play	did not play	did not play	did not qualify
2015	did not qualify	did not qualify	not seeded	qualifier
2016	not seeded	not seeded	24th	27th
2017	24th	9th	10th	4th
2018	4th	2nd	4th	4th
2019	4th	5th	6th	6th
2020	7th	6th	cancelled*	5th (1)
2021	6th	6th	4th	4th
2022	3rd	3rd	did not play	did not play
2023	12th	22nd	19th	12th
2024	6th	4th (2)	4th	4th
2025	2nd (3)	3rd	3rd	3rd
2026	3rd	**2nd (1)**	2nd (4)	**1st (2)**

* The 2020 Wimbledon Championships was cancelled due to the COVID-19 pandemic.

== ATP Tour career earnings ==
Year	Earnings (US$)	Money list rank
2011	436	n/a
2012	2,004	1294
2013	9,215	n/a
2014	176,757	167
2015	372,891	103
2016	1,371,329	25
2017	5,108,998	4
2018	8,706,298	2
2019	4,280,635	7
2020	3,279,966	5
2021	6,420,344	3
2022	2,678,178	15
2023	5,643,764	6
2024	11,501,623	2
2025	7,468,230	3
2026^	15,401,939	**1**
Career	$76,079,552	4

* Statistics correct as of 9 November 2026.

With a payout of $5,500,000 for winning the 2026 US Open, he received the highest prize money for a single tournament in ATP history at the time.

== See also ==
- List of Grand Slam men's singles champions
- List of Open Era Grand Slam champions by country
- Chronological list of men's Grand Slam tennis champions
- List of French Open men's singles champions
- List of US Open men's singles champions
- List of tennis title leaders in the Open Era
- List of ATP Big Titles singles champions
- Top ten ranked male tennis players
- List of male singles tennis players
- ATP Finals appearances
- List of Olympic medalists in tennis
- Germany Davis Cup team
- List of Germany Davis Cup team representatives
- List of Grand Slam boys' singles champions
- Junior tennis
- Tennis in Germany
