= 2020 Bett1Hulks Indoors – Doubles =

Doubles
- 2020 Bett1Hulks Indoors

Final
- Champions: (France) Pierre-Hugues Herbert (France) Nicolas Mahut
- Runners-up: (Poland) Łukasz Kubot (Brazil) Marcelo Melo
- Score: 6–4, 6–4

Events
| Singles | Doubles |
| Bett1Hulks Indoors | · 2021 → |

This was the first edition of the tournament, primarily organised due to the cancellation of many tournaments in 2020, due to the COVID-19 pandemic.

Pierre-Hugues Herbert and Nicolas Mahut won the title, defeating Łukasz Kubot and Marcelo Melo in the final, 6–4, 6–4.

== Seeds ==
1. (Poland) Łukasz Kubot / (Brazil) Marcelo Melo (final)
2. (France) Pierre-Hugues Herbert / (France) Nicolas Mahut (champions)
3. (South Africa) Raven Klaasen / (Austria) Oliver Marach (semifinals)
4. (Mexico) Santiago González / (United Kingdom) Ken Skupski (quarterfinals)

== Draw ==
=== Key ===
- Q = Qualifier
- WC = Wild card
- LL = Lucky loser
- Alt = Alternate
- SE = Special exempt
- PR = Protected ranking
- ITF = ITF entry
- JE = Junior exempt
- w/o = Walkover
- r = Retired
- d = Defaulted
- SR = Special ranking

=== Draw ===
First round
1 | (Poland) Ł Kubot (Brazil) M Melo | 7 | 7
(Canada) F Auger-Aliassime (Sweden) R Lindstedt | 5 | 5
(Bosnia and Herzegovina) T Brkić (Croatia) M Čilić | 6 | 6
(Poland) H Hurkacz (United States) S Johnson | 0 | 1
3 | (South Africa) R Klaasen (Austria) O Marach | 2 | 6 | [10]
WC | (Germany) A Zverev (Germany) M Zverev | 6 | 4 | [6]
(Spain) A Davidovich Fokina (Spain) F Verdasco | 3 | 6 | [10]
WC | (Germany) D Masur (Germany) R Molleker | 6 | 1 | [8]
(United Kingdom) D Inglot (Pakistan) A-u-H Qureshi | 6 | 6
(United States) N Monroe (France) B Paire | 3 | 4
(Denmark) F Nielsen (Germany) T Pütz | 6 | 1 | [5]
4 | (Mexico) S González (United Kingdom) K Skupski | 4 | 6 | [10]
(India) D Sharan (United States) J Withrow | 3 | 3
2 | (France) P-H Herbert (France) N Mahut | 6 | 6

Quarterfinals
1 | (Poland) Ł Kubot (Brazil) M Melo | 7^{7} | 2 | [10]
(Bosnia and Herzegovina) T Brkić (Croatia) M Čilić | 6^{2} | 6 | [5]
3 | (South Africa) R Klaasen (Austria) O Marach | 7 | 6
(Spain) A Davidovich Fokina (Spain) F Verdasco | 5 | 3
(United Kingdom) D Inglot (Pakistan) A-u-H Qureshi | 7^{9} | 2 | [10]
4 | (Mexico) S González (United Kingdom) K Skupski | 6^{7} | 6 | [5]
(Australia) J Millman (Australia) J Thompson | 3 | 3
2 | (France) P-H Herbert (France) N Mahut | 6 | 6

Semifinals
1 | (Poland) Ł Kubot (Brazil) M Melo | 6 | 6
3 | (South Africa) R Klaasen (Austria) O Marach | 4 | 3
(United Kingdom) D Inglot (Pakistan) A-u-H Qureshi | 4 | 7^{7} | [7]
2 | (France) P-H Herbert (France) N Mahut | 6 | 6^{1} | [10]

Final
1 | (Poland) Ł Kubot (Brazil) M Melo | 4 | 4
2 | (France) P-H Herbert (France) N Mahut | 6 | 6
