= 2020 Bett1Hulks Indoors – Singles =

Singles
- 2020 Bett1Hulks Indoors

Final
- Champion: (Germany) Alexander Zverev
- Runner-up: (Canada) Félix Auger-Aliassime
- Score: 6–3, 6–3

Details
- Draw: 28
- Seeds: 8

Events
Singles	Doubles
Bett1Hulks Indoors	· 2021 →

First seed Alexander Zverev won the tournament, defeating third seed Félix Auger-Aliassime 6–3, 6–3 in the final. This was the first edition of the tournament, primarily organised due to the cancellation of many tournaments in 2020, due to the COVID-19 pandemic.

== Seeds ==
The top four seeds received a bye into the second round.

1. (Germany) Alexander Zverev (champion)
2. (Spain) Roberto Bautista Agut (semifinals)
3. (Canada) Félix Auger-Aliassime (final)
4. (France) Benoît Paire (second round)
5. (Serbia) Filip Krajinović (first round)
6. (Poland) Hubert Hurkacz (quarterfinals)
7. (Germany) Jan-Lennard Struff (first round)
8. (Croatia) Marin Čilić (second round)

== Draw ==
=== Key ===
- Q = Qualifier
- WC = Wild card
- LL = Lucky loser
- Alt = Alternate
- SE = Special exempt
- PR = Protected ranking
- ITF = ITF entry
- JE = Junior exempt
- w/o = Walkover
- r = Retired
- d = Defaulted
- SR = Special ranking

=== Finals ===
Semifinals
1	(Germany) Alexander Zverev	7	7^{7}
(Spain) Alejandro Davidovich Fokina	5	6^{3}
3	(Canada) Félix Auger-Aliassime	6	1	6
2	(Spain) Roberto Bautista Agut	3	6	3

Final
1	(Germany) Alexander Zverev	6	6
3	(Canada) Félix Auger-Aliassime	3	3

=== Top half ===
First round
(Spain) F Verdasco	6	6
WC	(United Kingdom) A Murray	4	4
(United Kingdom) K Edmund	5	6^{1}
Q	(South Africa) L Harris	7	7^{7}
(United States) S Johnson	3	6	6
5	(Serbia) F Krajinović	6	4	4
(Australia) J Thompson	3	3
(Austria) D Novak	6	6
Q	(Finland) E Ruusuvuori	5	4
(Spain) A Davidovich Fokina	7	6
LL	(United States) M Giron	2	6	3
8	(Croatia) M Čilić	6	4	6

Second round
1	(Germany) A Zverev	6	6
(Spain) F Verdasco	4	1
Q	(South Africa) L Harris	7^{7}	7^{7}
(United States) S Johnson	6^{5}	6^{2}
4	(France) B Paire	3	4
(Austria) D Novak	6	6
(Spain) A Davidovich Fokina	3	7^{7}	6
8	(Croatia) M Čilić	6	6^{3}	2

Quarterfinals
1	(Germany) A Zverev	6	3	6
Q	(South Africa) L Harris	4	6	0
(Austria) D Novak	3	6	3
(Spain) A Davidovich Fokina	6	2	6

Semifinals
1	(Germany) A Zverev	7	7^{7}
(Spain) A Davidovich Fokina	5	6^{3}

=== Bottom half ===
First round
7	(Germany) J-L Struff	4	3
Q	(Germany) O Otte	6	6
(Moldova) R Albot	6	4	6
(France) P-H Herbert	2	6	4
WC	(Germany) D Altmaier	6	3	6^{5}
Q	(Switzerland) H Laaksonen	3	6	7^{7}
6	(Poland) H Hurkacz	6	7
LL	(Australia) M Polmans	2	5
(Australia) J Millman	1	4
WC	(Germany) M Zverev	6	6
(France) G Simon	6	6
(Hungary) M Fucsovics	0	3

Second round
Q	(Germany) O Otte	4	7	5
(Moldova) R Albot	6	5	7
Q	(Switzerland) H Laaksonen	4	1
3	(Canada) F Auger-Aliassime	6	6
6	(Poland) H Hurkacz	6	6
WC	(Germany) M Zverev	4	3
(France) G Simon	4	6^{5}
2	(Spain) R Bautista Agut	6	7^{7}

Quarterfinals
(Moldova) R Albot	3	0
3	(Canada) F Auger-Aliassime	6	6
6	(Poland) H Hurkacz	6^{4}	7	0
2	(Spain) R Bautista Agut	7^{7}	5	6

Semifinals
3	(Canada) F Auger-Aliassime	6	1	6
2	(Spain) R Bautista Agut	3	6	3

== Qualifying ==
=== Seeds ===
1. (Germany) Dominik Koepfer (first round)
2. (South Africa) Lloyd Harris (qualified)
3. (Finland) Emil Ruusuvuori (qualified)
4. (Japan) Yūichi Sugita (first round)
5. (Japan) Yasutaka Uchiyama (first round)
6. (United States) Marcos Giron (qualifying competition, lucky loser)
7. (France) Grégoire Barrère (first round)
8. (Australia) Marc Polmans (qualifying competition, lucky loser)

=== Qualifiers ===
1. (Germany) Oscar Otte
2. (South Africa) Lloyd Harris
3. (Finland) Emil Ruusuvuori
4. (Switzerland) Henri Laaksonen

=== Lucky losers ===
1. (Australia) Marc Polmans
2. (United States) Marcos Giron

=== Qualifying draw ===
==== First qualifier ====
First round
1	(Germany) Dominik Koepfer	1	2
(Germany) Oscar Otte	6	6
(Croatia) Ivo Karlović	1	4
8	(Australia) Marc Polmans	6	6

Qualifying competition
(Germany) Oscar Otte	6^{6}	6	6
8	(Australia) Marc Polmans	7^{8}	4	4

==== Second qualifier ====
First round
2	(South Africa) Lloyd Harris	2	6	6
(Germany) Peter Gojowczyk	6	1	3
WC	(Germany) Rudolf Molleker	4	3
6	(United States) Marcos Giron	6	6

Qualifying competition
2	(South Africa) Lloyd Harris	2	6	6
6	(United States) Marcos Giron	6	4	2

==== Third qualifier ====
First round
3	(Finland) Emil Ruusuvuori	7^{7}	6
(Chinese Taipei) Jason Jung	6^{4}	3
(France) Antoine Hoang	7	6
7	(France) Grégoire Barrère	5	4

Qualifying competition
3	(Finland) Emil Ruusuvuori	6	6
(France) Antoine Hoang	1	3

==== Fourth qualifier ====
First round
4	(Japan) Yūichi Sugita	1	4
(Switzerland) Henri Laaksonen	6	6
WC	(Germany) Daniel Masur	6	6
5	(Japan) Yasutaka Uchiyama	2	1

Qualifying competition
(Switzerland) Henri Laaksonen	7	6
WC	(Germany) Daniel Masur	5	2
