= 2020 Bett1Hulks Championship =

- Date: 19–25 October
- Edition: 1st
- Category: ATP Tour 250
- Draw: 28S / 16D
- Prize money: €325,610
- Surface: Hard / indoors
- Location: Cologne, Germany
- Venue: Lanxess Arena

Champions

Singles
- (Germany) Alexander Zverev

Doubles
- (South Africa) Raven Klaasen / (Japan) Ben McLachlan
- Bett1Hulks Championship

The 2020 Bett1Hulks Championship was an ATP tournament organized for male professional tennis players, held in Cologne, Germany, in mid-October 2020 on indoor hard courts. It was primarily organized due to the cancellation of many tournaments during the 2020 season due to the COVID-19 pandemic. It was the first and only edition of the tournament and it took place at the Lanxess Arena in Cologne, Germany, from October 19 through 25, 2020.

== Singles main-draw entrants ==
=== Seeds ===
Country	Player	Rank^{1}	Seed
GER	Alexander Zverev	7	1
ARG	Diego Schwartzman	8	2
CAN	Denis Shapovalov	12	3
~~ESP~~	~~Roberto Bautista Agut~~	~~13~~	~~4~~
CAN	Félix Auger-Aliassime	22	5
~~POL~~	~~Hubert Hurkacz~~	~~31~~	~~6~~
GER	Jan-Lennard Struff	32	7
FRA	Adrian Mannarino	38	8
CRO	Marin Čilić	40	9

- Rankings are as of 12 October 2020.

=== Other entrants ===
The following players received wildcards into the singles main draw:

- (Germany) Daniel Altmaier
- ~~(United Kingdom) Andy Murray~~
- (Italy) Jannik Sinner

The following players received entry using a special exempt:

- (Italy) Marco Cecchinato
- ~~(Serbia) Danilo Petrović~~

The following players received entry from the qualifying draw:

- (Bosnia and Herzegovina) Damir Džumhur
- (Belarus) Egor Gerasimov
- (France) Pierre-Hugues Herbert
- (Austria) Dennis Novak

The following players received entry as lucky losers:

- (Australia) James Duckworth
- (India) Sumit Nagal
- (Germany) Oscar Otte
- (Australia) Alexei Popyrin

=== Withdrawals ===
- (Spain) Roberto Bautista Agut → replaced by (India) Sumit Nagal
- (Poland) Hubert Hurkacz → replaced by (Australia) James Duckworth
- (Serbia) Filip Krajinović → replaced by (Japan) Yoshihito Nishioka
- (United Kingdom) Andy Murray → replaced by (Australia) Alexei Popyrin
- (France) Gaël Monfils → replaced by (United States) Steve Johnson
- (France) Benoît Paire → replaced by (France) Gilles Simon
- (Argentina) Guido Pella → replaced by (United States) Tennys Sandgren
- (Serbia) Danilo Petrović → replaced by (Germany) Oscar Otte
- (United States) Sam Querrey → replaced by (Spain) Fernando Verdasco
- (Italy) Lorenzo Sonego → replaced by (Australia) Jordan Thompson
- (Switzerland) Stan Wawrinka → replaced by (Spain) Alejandro Davidovich Fokina

== Doubles main-draw entrants ==
=== Seeds ===
Country	Player	Country	Player	Rank^{1}	Seed
POL	Łukasz Kubot	BRA	Marcelo Melo	24	1
AUT	Oliver Marach	CRO	Mate Pavić	32	2
GER	Kevin Krawietz	GER	Andreas Mies	37	3
AUT	Jürgen Melzer	FRA	Édouard Roger-Vasselin	55	4

- Rankings are as of 12 October 2020

=== Other entrants ===
The following pairs received wildcards into the doubles main draw:

- (Germany) Daniel Altmaier / (Germany) Oscar Otte
- (Germany) Alexander Zverev / (Germany) Mischa Zverev

== Champions ==
=== Singles ===
- (Germany) Alexander Zverev def. (Argentina) Diego Schwartzman, 6–2, 6–1

=== Doubles ===
- (South Africa) Raven Klaasen / (Japan) Ben McLachlan def. (Germany) Kevin Krawietz / (Germany) Andreas Mies, 6–2, 6–4

== See also ==
- 2020 Bett1Hulks Indoors
