= ATP 250 tournaments =

Tennis tournament category

The ATP 250 tournaments are the lowest tier of annual men's tennis tournaments on the main ATP Tour, after the four Grand Slam tournaments, ATP Finals, ATP 1000 tournaments, and ATP 500 tournaments. The winners of each tournament are awarded 250 ranking points—which accounts for the name of the series.

As of 2025, the series included 30 tournaments after the retirement of four tournaments (Atlanta, Córdoba, Metz and Marseille), the downgrade of two in 2025 (Estoril for a year, and Newport) and the upgrade of three tournaments to the 500 level (Dallas, Doha and Munich). Draws usually consist of 28 for singles, with Brisbane International (32) and Winston-Salem Open (48) being the only exceptions. Doubles draws consist of 16 teams.

Thomas Muster holds the record for most singles titles at 26, while Mike Bryan holds the record for most doubles titles won with 46.

== Historic names ==
- 1990–1999: ATP World Series
- 2000–2008: ATP International Series
- 2009–2018: ATP World Tour 250
- 2019–present: ATP 250

== ATP points ==
Event	W	F	SF	QF	R16	R32	Q	Q2	Q1
Singles	250	165	100	50	25*	(13)	13 (8)	7 (4)	0
Doubles	250	150	90	45	(20)	—N/a	—N/a	—N/a	—N/a

- Players with byes receive first round points.
- Parentheses indicate points for 48-player draw for singles and 24-pair draw for doubles.

== Tournaments ==
Current events
Tournament	City	Venue	Surface	Date
Brisbane International	Brisbane	Queensland Tennis Centre	Hard	5–11 January
Hong Kong Open	Hong Kong	Victoria Park Tennis Stadium	Hard	5–11 January
Adelaide International	Adelaide	Memorial Drive Tennis Centre	Hard	12–17 January
Auckland Open	Auckland	ASB Tennis Centre	Hard	12–17 January
Open Occitanie	Montpellier	Sud de France Arena	Hard (i)	2–8 February
Argentina Open	Buenos Aires	Buenos Aires Lawn Tennis Club	Clay	9–15 February
Delray Beach Open	Delray Beach	Delray Beach Tennis Center	Hard	16–22 February
Chile Open	Santiago	Club Deportivo Universidad Católica	Clay	24 February–2 March
U.S. Men's Clay Court Championships	Houston	River Oaks Country Club	Clay	31 March–6 April
Grand Prix Hassan II	Marrakesh	Royal Tennis Club de Marrakech	Clay	31 March–6 April
Romanian Open	Bucharest	BNR Arenas	Clay	31 March–6 April
Geneva Open	Geneva	Tennis Club de Genève	Clay	17–23 May
Stuttgart Open	Stuttgart	Tennis Club Weissenhof	Grass	8–14 June
Libéma Open	's-Hertogenbosch	Autotron Rosmalen	Grass	8–14 June
Mallorca Championships	Santa Ponsa	Santa Ponsa Tennis Academy	Grass	21–27 June
Eastbourne Open	Eastbourne	Devonshire Park Lawn Tennis Club	Grass	22–28 June
Swedish Open	Båstad	Båstad Tennis Stadium	Clay	13–19 July
Swiss Open Gstaad	Gstaad	Roy Emerson Arena	Clay	13–19 July
Croatia Open Umag	Umag	ITC Stella Maris	Clay	13–18 July
Estoril Open	Cascais	Clube de Ténis do Estoril	Clay	20–26 July
Generali Open Kitzbühel	Kitzbühel	Tennis Stadium Kitzbühel	Clay	20–25 July
Los Cabos Open	Los Cabos	Cabo Sports Complex	Hard	27 Jul–1 Aug
Winston-Salem Open	Winston-Salem	Wake Forest University	Hard	17–23 August
Chengdu Open	Chengdu	Sichuan International Tennis Center	Hard	23–29 September
Hangzhou Open	Hangzhou	Hangzhou Olympic Sports Expo Center	Hard	23–29 September
Almaty Open	Almaty	Daulet National Tennis Centre	Hard (i)	19–25 October
European Open	Brussels	ING Arena	Hard (i)	19–25 October
Grand Prix Auvergne-Rhône-Alpes	Lyon	LDLC Arena	Hard (i)	19–25 October
Stockholm Open	Stockholm	Kungliga tennishallen	Hard (i)	8–13 November

Location map of current ATP 250 events
Location map of current ATP 250 events in Europe

Past Events
Tournament	City	Venue	Surface	Status
Hellenic Championship	Athens	OAKA Basketball Arena	Hard (i)	Defunct
Open 13 (1993–2025)	Marseille	Palais des sports de Marseille	Hard (i)	Defunct (Note: The tournament was relocated to Lyon in 2026 as the Grand Prix Auvergne-Rhône-Alpes)
Moselle Open (2003–2025)	Metz	Arènes de Metz	Hard (i)	Defunct
Bavarian International (1899–2024)	Munich	MTTC Iphitos	Clay	ATP 500
Hall of Fame Open (1976–2024)	Newport	International Tennis Hall of Fame	Grass	ATP 175
Qatar Open (1993–2024)	Doha	Khalifa International Tennis and Squash Complex	Hard	ATP 500
Atlanta Open (2012–2024)	Atlanta	Atlantic Station	Hard	Defunct
Lyon Open (2017–2024)	Lyon	Vélodrome Georges Préveral	Clay	Defunct
Córdoba Open (2019–2024)	Córdoba	Estadio Mario Alberto Kempes	Clay	Defunct
Belgrade Open (2021, 2024)	Belgrade	Belgrade Arena	Hard (i)	Defunct (Note: The tournament was relocated to Athens in 2025)
Dallas Open (2022–2024)	Dallas	Ford Center at the Star	Hard (i)	ATP 500
Maharashtra Open (1996–2023)	Pune	Shree Shiv Chhatrapati Sports Complex	Hard	Defunct
Sofia Open (2016–2023)	Sofia	Arena Armeec	Hard (i)	Defunct
Zhuhai Championships (2019, 2023)	Zhuhai	Hengqin International Tennis Center	Hard	Defunct
Srpska Open (2023)	Banja Luka	Tenis Klub Mladost	Clay	Defunct
Florence Open (1973–1994, 2022)	Florence	Palazzo Wanny	Hard	Defunct
Tel Aviv Open (1990–1996, 2022)	Tel Aviv	Expo Tel Aviv	Hard (i)	Defunct
Serbia Open (2009–2022)	Belgrade	SRPC Milan Gale Muškatirović	Clay	Defunct
Sydney International (1885–2022)	Sydney	NSW Tennis Centre	Hard	Defunct
San Diego Open (2021–2022)	San Diego	Barnes Tennis Center	Clay	ATP 100
Melbourne Summer Set (2022)	Melbourne	Melbourne Park	Hard	Defunct
Korea Open (2022)	Seoul	Seoul Olympic Park Tennis Center	Hard	Defunct (Note: While the men's event was abolished, the women's event is still active.)
Tennis Napoli Cup (2022)	Naples	Tennis Club Napoli	Hard	ATP 125
Gijón Open (2022)	Gijón	Palacio de Deportes de Gijón	Hard (i)	Defunct
Singapore Open (1989–2021)	Singapore	Singapore Sports Hub	Hard (i)	Defunct
Kremlin Cup (1990–2021)	Moscow	Olympic Stadium	Hard (i)	Defunct
St. Petersburg Open (1995–2021)	St. Petersburg	Sibur Arena	Hard (i)	Defunct
Antalya Open (2017–2021)	Antalya	Limak Arcadia Sport Resort	Hard (i)	Defunct
Sardegna Open (2020–2021)	Cagliari	Cagliari Tennis Club	Clay	Defunct
Andalucia Open (2021)	Marbella	Club de Tenis Puente Romano	Clay	Defunct
Emilia-Romagna Open (2021)	Parma	Tennis Club President di Montechiarugolo	Clay	ATP 125
New York Open (2018–2020)	Uniondale	Nassau Coliseum	Hard (i)	Defunct
Bett1Hulks Cologne Indoors (2020)	Cologne	Lanxess Arena	Hard (i)	Defunct
Bett1Hulks Cologne Championship (2020)	Cologne	Lanxess Arena	Hard (i)	Defunct
Brasil Open (2001–2019)	São Paulo	Ginásio do Ibirapuera	Hard (i)	Defunct
Hungarian Open (2017–2019)	Budapest	Sport11 Sport and Event Center	Clay	Defunct
Shenzhen Open (2014–2018)	Shenzhen	Shenzhen Longgang Sports Center	Hard	Defunct
Ecuador Open (2015–2018)	Quito	Club Jacarandá	Clay	Defunct
Istanbul Open (2015–2018)	Istanbul	Koza World of Sports Arena	Clay	Defunct
Memphis Open (1975–2017)	Memphis	Racquet Club of Memphis	Hard (i)	Defunct
Nice Open (1925–2016)	Nice	Nice Lawn Tennis Club	Clay	Defunct
Nottingham Open (1970–2008, 2015–2016)	Nottingham	Nottingham Tennis Centre	Grass	ATP 125
Malaysian Open (1927–2015)	Kuala Lumpur	Putra Indoor Stadium	Hard (i)	Defunct
Zagreb Indoors (1996–2015)	Zagreb	Dom Sportova	Hard (i)	Defunct
Colombia Open (2013–2015)	Bogotá	Centro de Alto Rendimiento	Hard	Defunct
Valencia Open (2013–2015)	Valencia	City of Arts and Sciences	Hard (i)	Defunct
Queen's Club Championships (1886–2014)	London	Queen's Club	Grass	ATP 500
Vienna Open (1974–2014)	Vienna	Wiener Stadthalle	Hard (i)	ATP 500
Portugal Open (1990–2014)	Oeiras	Estádio Nacional do Jamor	Clay	Defunct
Halle Open (1993–2014)	Halle	Gerry Weber Stadion	Grass	ATP 500
Düsseldorf Open (2013–2014)	Düsseldorf	Rochusclub Düsseldorfer Tennisclub	Clay	Defunct
Pacific Coast Championships (1889–2013)	San Jose	SAP Center at San Jose	Hard (i)	Defunct
Thailand Open (2003–2013)	Bangkok	Impact Arena	Hard (i)	Defunct
Los Angeles Open (1927–2012)	Los Angeles	Los Angeles Tennis Center	Hard	Defunct
SA Tennis Open (2009–2011)	Johannesburg	Montecasino	Hard	Defunct

== Singles champions ==
=== ATP World Tour 250 ===
	2009	2010	2011	2012	2013	2014	2015	2016	2017	2018
Brisbane	Štěpánek (2/3)	Roddick (19/21)	Söderling (5/7)	Murray (11/17)	Murray (12/17)	Hewitt (21/22)	Federer (23/25)	Raonic (7/7)	Dimitrov (4/6)	Kyrgios (3/3)
Chennai/Pune	Čilić (2/17)	Čilić (4/17)	Wawrinka (3/9)	Raonic (2/7)	Tipsarević (4/4)	Wawrinka (5/9)	Wawrinka (6/9)	Wawrinka (7/9)	Bautista Agut (5/11)	Simon (12/13)
Doha	Murray (7/17)	Davydenko (15/16)	Federer (20/25)	Tsonga (6/14)	Gasquet (8/16)	Nadal (7/10)	Ferrer (14/16)	Djokovic (7/14)	Djokovic (8/14)	Monfils (6/10)
Sydney	Nalbandian (7/7)	Baghdatis (4/4)	Simon (8/13)	Nieminen (2/2)	Tomic (1/4)	del Potro (9/11)	Troicki (2/3)	Troicki (3/3)	Muller (1/2)	Medvedev (1/12)
Auckland	del Potro (3/11)	Isner (1/15)	Ferrer (6/16)	Ferrer (7/16)	Ferrer (11/16)	Isner (8/15)	Veselý (1/2)	Bautista Agut (3/11)	Sock (2/3)	Bautista Agut (7/11)
Lyon/ Montpellier	Ljubičić (7/7)	Monfils (3/10)	Not an event	Berdych (4/9)	Gasquet (9/16)	Monfils (5/10)	Gasquet (11/16)	Gasquet (13/16)	A. Zverev (2/8)	Pouille (4/4)
Zagreb	Čilić (3/17)	Čilić (5/17)	Dodig (1/1)	Youzhny (7/8)	Čilić (9/17)	Čilić (10/17)	García-López (4/5)	Not an event		
Johannesburg	Tsonga (2/14)	F. López (1/4)	Anderson (1/6)	Not an event						
Viña del Mar/ Santiago	González (11/11)	Bellucci (2/4)	Robredo (8/10)	Mónaco (3/7)	Zeballos (1/1)	Fognini (2/7)	Not an event			
Quito	Not an event						Estrella Burgos (1/3)	Estrella Burgos (2/3)	Estrella Burgos (3/3)	Carballés Baena (1/2)
Sofia	Not an event							Bautista Agut (4/11)	Dimitrov (5/6)	Bašić (1/1)
San Jose	Štěpánek (3/3)	Verdasco (4/6)	Raonic (1/7)	Raonic (3/7)	Raonic (4/7)	Not an event				
Memphis/New York	ATP World Tour 500					Nishikori (2/6)	Nishikori (4/6)	Nishikori (5/6)	Harrison (1/1)	Anderson (4/6)
Buenos Aires	Robredo (7/10)	Ferrero (7/9)	Almagro (7/11)	Ferrer (8/16)	Ferrer (12/16)	Ferrer (13/16)	Nadal (8/10)	Thiem (4/10)	Dolgopolov (2/2)	Thiem (7/10)
Marseille	Tsonga (3/14)	Llodra (3/4)	Söderling (6/7)	del Potro (6/11)	Tsonga (8/14)	Gulbis (5/6)	Simon (11/13)	Kyrgios (1/3)	Tsonga (10/14)	Khachanov (2/6)
Delray Beach	Fish (3/6)	Gulbis (1/6)	del Potro (4/11)	Anderson (2/6)	Gulbis (3/6)	Čilić (11/17)	Karlović (6/8)	Querrey (7/8)	Sock (3/3)	Tiafoe (1/3)
Costa do Sauípe/ São Paulo	Robredo (6/10)	Ferrero (6/9)	Almagro (6/11)	Almagro (9/11)	Nadal (6/10)	Delbonis (1/2)	Cuevas (3/5)	Cuevas (4/5)	Cuevas (5/5)	Fognini (5/7)
Houston	Hewitt (19/22)	Chela (3/4)	Sweeting (1/1)	Mónaco (4/7)	Isner (6/15)	Verdasco (5/6)	Sock (1/3)	Mónaco (7/7)	Johnson (2/4)	Johnson (3/4)
Casablanca/ Marrakesh	Ferrero (5/9)	Wawrinka (2/9)	Andújar (1/4)	Andújar (2/4)	Robredo (9/10)	García-López (3/5)	Kližan (3/4)	Delbonis (2/2)	Ćorić (1/1)	Andújar (4/4)
Bucharest	Montañés (3/6)	Chela (4/4)	Mayer (1/1)	Simon (9/13)	Rosol (1/2)	Dimitrov (2/6)	García-López (5/5)	Verdasco (6/6)	Not an event	
Budapest	Not an event								Pouille (2/4)	Cecchinato (1/3)
Belgrade	Djokovic (5/14)	Querrey (3/8)	Djokovic (6/14)	Seppi (2/3)	Not an event					
Munich	Berdych (3/9)	Youzhny (5/8)	Davydenko (16/16)	Kohlschreiber (4/8)	Haas (9/10)	Kližan (2/4)	Murray (16/17)	Kohlschreiber (7/8)	A. Zverev (3/8)	A. Zverev (4/8)
Estoril	Montañés (2/6)	Montañés (4/6)	del Potro (5/11)	del Potro (7/11)	Wawrinka (4/9)	Berlocq (2/2)	Gasquet (12/16)	Almagro (11/11)	Carreño Busta (3/5)	Sousa (3/4)
Istanbul	Not an event						Federer (24/25)	Schwartzman (1/3)	Čilić (14/17)	Daniel (1/1)
Düsseldorf	Team event				Mónaco (6/7)	Kohlschreiber (5/8)	Not an event			
Geneva	Not an event						Bellucci (4/4)	Wawrinka (8/9)	Wawrinka (9/9)	Fucsovics (1/3)
Lyon	Not an event								Tsonga (11/14)	Thiem (8/10)
Nice	Not an event	Gasquet (6/16)	Almagro (8/11)	Almagro (10/11)	Montañés (6/6)	Gulbis (6/6)	Thiem (1/10)	Thiem (5/10)	Not an event	
's-Hertogenbosch	Becker (1/1)	Stakhovsky (3/4)	Tursunov (7/7)	Ferrer (9/16)	Mahut (1/4)	Bautista Agut (1/11)	Mahut (3/4)	Mahut (4/4)	Muller (2/2)	Gasquet (15/16)
Stuttgart	Chardy (1/1)	Montañés (5/6)	Ferrero (9/9)	Tipsarević (3/4)	Fognini (1/7)	Bautista Agut (2/11)	Nadal (9/10)	Thiem (6/10)	Pouille (3/4)	Federer (25/25)
Halle	Haas (7/10)	Hewitt (20/22)	Kohlschreiber (3/8)	Haas (8/10)	Federer (21/25)	Federer (22/25)	ATP World Tour 500			
London	Murray (8/17)	Querrey (4/8)	Murray (9/17)	Čilić (7/17)	Murray (13/17)	Dimitrov (3/6)	ATP World Tour 500			
Eastbourne	Tursunov (6/7)	Llodra (4/4)	Seppi (1/3)	Roddick (20/21)	F. López (2/4)	F. López (3/4)	Not an event		Djokovic (9/14)	M. Zverev (1/1)
Nottingham	ATP Challenger Tour						Istomin (1/2)	Johnson (1/4)	Not an event	
Antalya	Not an event								Sugita (1/1)	Dzumhur (3/3)
Newport	Ram (1/2)	Fish (4/6)	Isner (2/15)	Isner (4/15)	Mahut (2/4)	Hewitt (22/22)	Ram (2/2)	Karlović (7/8)	Isner (11/15)	Johnson (4/4)
Båstad	Söderling (4/7)	Almagro (4/11)	Söderling (7/7)	Ferrer (10/16)	Berlocq (1/2)	Cuevas (1/5)	Paire (1/3)	Ramos Viñolas (1/4)	Ferrer (16/16)	Fognini (6/7)
Umag	Davydenko (13/16)	Ferrero (8/9)	Dolgopolov (1/2)	Čilić (8/17)	Robredo (10/10)	Cuevas (2/5)	Thiem (2/10)	Fognini (3/7)	Rublev (1/10)	Cecchinato (2/3)
Bogota	Not an event				Karlović (5/8)	Tomic (2/4)	Tomic (3/4)	Not an event		
Gstaad	Bellucci (1/4)	Almagro (5/11)	Granollers (2/3)	Bellucci (3/4)	Youzhny (8/8)	Andújar (3/4)	Thiem (3/10)	F. López (4/4)	Fognini (4/7)	Berrettini (1/8)
Indianapolis/ Atlanta	Ginepri (3/3)	Fish (5/6)	Fish (6/6)	Roddick (21/21)	Isner (7/15)	Isner (9/15)	Isner (10/15)	Kyrgios (2/3)	Isner (12/15)	Isner (13/15)
Kitzbühel	García-López (1/5)	ATP Challenger Tour	Haase (1/2)	Haase (2/2)	Granollers (3/3)	Goffin (1/5)	Kohlschreiber (6/8)	Lorenzi (1/1)	Kohlschreiber (8/8)	Kližan (4/4)
Los Angeles	Querrey (2/8)	Querrey (5/8)	Gulbis (2/6)	Querrey (6/8)	Not an event					
Los Cabos	Not an event							Karlović (8/8)	Querrey (8/8)	Fognini (7/7)
New Haven/ Winston-Salem	Verdasco (3/6)	Stakhovsky (4/4)	Isner (3/15)	Isner (5/15)	Melzer (4/4)	Rosol (2/2)	Anderson (3/6)	Carreño Busta (1/5)	Bautista Agut (6/11)	Medvedev (2/12)
St. Petersburg	Stakhovsky (2/4)	Kukushkin (1/1)	Čilić (6/17)	Kližan (1/4)	Gulbis (4/6)	Not an event	Raonic (6/7)	A. Zverev (1/8)	Dzumhur (1/3)	Thiem (9/10)
Metz	Monfils (2/10)	Simon (7/13)	Tsonga (4/14)	Tsonga (7/14)	Simon (10/13)	Goffin (2/5)	Tsonga (9/14)	Pouille (1/4)	Gojowczyk (1/1)	Simon (13/13)
Shenzhen	Not an event					Murray (14/17)	Berdych (7/9)	Berdych (9/9)	Goffin (3/5)	Nishioka (1/3)
Chengdu	Not an event							Khachanov (1/6)	Istomin (2/2)	Tomic (4/4)
Kuala Lumpur	Davydenko (14/16)	Youzhny (6/8)	Tipsarević (1/4)	Mónaco (5/7)	Sousa (1/4)	Nishikori (3/6)	Ferrer (15/16)	Not an event		
Bangkok	Simon (6/13)	García-López (2/5)	Murray (10/17)	Gasquet (7/16)	Raonic (5/7)	Not an event				
Moscow	Youzhny (4/8)	Troicki (1/3)	Tipsarević (2/4)	Seppi (3/3)	Gasquet (10/16)	Čilić (12/17)	Cilic (13/17)	Carreño Busta (2/5)	Dzumhur (2/3)	Khachanov (3/6)
Stockholm	Baghdatis (3/4)	Federer (19/25)	Monfils (4/10)	Berdych (5/9)	Dimitrov (1/6)	Berdych (6/9)	Berdych (8/9)	del Potro (10/11)	del Potro (11/11)	Tsitsipas (1/8)
Antwerp	Not an event							Gasquet (14/16)	Tsonga (12/14)	Edmund (1/2)
Vienna	Melzer (2/4)	Melzer (3/4)	Tsonga (5/14)	del Potro (8/11)	Haas (10/10)	Murray (15/17)	ATP World Tour 500			
Valencia	ATP World Tour 500						Sousa (2/4)	Not an event		

=== ATP 250 tournaments ===
	2019	2020	2021	2022	2023	2024	2025	2026	2027
Brisbane	Nishikori (6/6)	ATP Cup	Cancelled	Cancelled	United Cup	Dimitrov (6/6)	Lehečka (2/2)	(Note: Competed under no flag due to the Russian invasion of Ukraine.) Medvedev (10/12)	
Hong Kong	Not an event					Rublev (9/10)	Müller (1/1)	Bublik (7/7)	
Adelaide/Melbourne	Not an event	Rublev (4/10)	Sinner (2/6)	Monfils (8/10)	Djokovic (12/14)	Lehečka (1/2)	Auger-Aliassime (3/6)	Macháč (1/1)	
Auckland	Sandgren (1/1)	Humbert (1/5)	Cancelled	Cancelled	Gasquet (16/16)	Tabilo (1/3)	Monfils (10/10)	Menšík (1/1)	
Melbourne 2	Not an event		Evans (1/1)	Nadal (10/10)	Not an event				
Sydney	de Minaur (1/7)	ATP Cup		Karatsev (2/2)	United Cup				
Adelaide 2	Not an event			Kokkinakis (1/1)	Kwon (2/2)	Not an event			
Pune	Anderson (5/6)	Vesely (2/2)	Cancelled	Sousa (4/4)	Griekspoor (1/4)	Not an event			
Montpellier	Tsonga (13/14)	Monfils (7/10)	Goffin (4/5)	Bublik (1/7)	Sinner (6/6)	Bublik (3/7)	Auger-Aliassime (4/6)	Auger-Aliassime (6/6)	
New York/Dallas	Opelka (1/4)	Edmund (2/2)	Cancelled	Opelka (3/4)	Wu (1/1)	Paul (2/4)	ATP Tour 500		
Marseille	Tsitsipas (2/8)	Tsitsipas (4/8)	Medvedev (5/12)	Rublev (5/10)	Hurkacz (4/5)	Humbert (4/5)	Humbert (5/5)	Not an event	
Córdoba	Londero (1/1)	Garín (3/4)	J. Cerúndolo (1/1)	Ramos Viñolas (4/4)	Báez (2/5)	Darderi (1/5)	Not an event		
Delray Beach	Albot (1/1)	Opelka (2/4)	Hurkacz (2/5)	Norrie (2/3)	Fritz (3/9)	Fritz (5/9)	Kecmanović (2/2)	Korda (2/2)	
Buenos Aires	Cecchinato (3/3)	Ruud (1/12)	Schwartzman (3/3)	Ruud (7/12)	Alcaraz (2/2)	Díaz Acosta (1/1)	Fonseca (1/1)	F. Cerúndolo (4/4)	
Doha	Bautista Agut (8/11)	Rublev (3/10)	Basilashvili (1/2)	Bautista Agut (9/11)	Medvedev (8/12)	Khachanov (5/6)	ATP Tour 500		
Singapore	Not an event		Popyrin (1/2)	Not an event					
São Paulo	Pella (1/1)	Not an event							
Santiago	Not an event	Seyboth Wild (1/1)	Garín (4/4)	Martínez (1/1)	Jarry (2/3)	Báez (5/5)	Djere (2/2)	Darderi (5/5)	
Houston	Garín (1/4)	Cancelled	Cancelled	Opelka (4/4)	Tiafoe (2/3)	Shelton (1/2)	Brooksby (1/1)	Paul (4/4)	
Marrakesh	Paire (2/3)	Cancelled	Cancelled	Goffin (5/5)	Carballés Baena (2/2)	Berrettini (6/8)	Darderi (2/5)	Jódar (1/1)	
Andalucia	Not an event		Carreño Busta (5/5)	Not an event					
Banja Luka	Not an event				Lajović (2/2)	Not an event			
Belgrade	Not an event		Berrettini (4/8)	Rublev (6/10)	Not an event				
Budapest	Berrettini (2/8)	Cancelled due to the COVID-19 pandemic	Not an event						
Estoril	Tsitsipas (3/8)	Cancelled due to the COVID-19 pandemic	Ramos Viñolas (3/4)	Báez (1/5)	Ruud (10/12)	Hurkacz (5/5)	ATP Challenger Tour	Van Assche (1/1)	
Munich	Garín (2/4)	Cancelled due to the COVID-19 pandemic	Basilashvili (2/2)	Rune (1/3)	Rune (3/3)	Struff (1/1)	ATP Tour 500		
Bucharest	Not an event	Cancelled due to the COVID-19 pandemic	Not an event			Fucsovics (2/3)	Cobolli (1/1)	Navone (1/1)	
Geneva	A. Zverev (5/8)	Cancelled due to the COVID-19 pandemic	Ruud (2/12)	Ruud (8/12)	Jarry (3/3)	Ruud (11/12)	Djokovic (13/14)	Tien (2/2)	
Lyon	Paire (3/3)	Cancelled due to the COVID-19 pandemic	Tsitsipas (5/8)	Norrie (3/3)	Fils (1/1)	Mpetshi Perricard (1/1)	Not an event	Musetti (2/2)	
Parma	ATP Challenger Tour		Korda (1/2)	ATP Challenger Tour					
Stuttgart	Berrettini (3/8)	Cancelled	Čilić (15/17)	Berrettini (5/8)	Tiafoe (3/3)	Draper (1/1)	Fritz (7/9)	Majchrzak (1/1)	
's-Hertogenbosch	Mannarino (1/5)	Cancelled	Cancelled	van Rijthoven (1/1)	Griekspoor (2/4)	de Minaur (7/7)	Diallo (1/1)	Shelton (2/2)	
Mallorca	Not an event	Cancelled	Medvedev (6/12)	Tsitsipas (6/8)	Eubanks (1/1)	Tabilo (2/3)	Griekspoor (3/4)	Davidovich Fokina (1/2)	
Eastbourne	Fritz (1/9)	Cancelled	de Minaur (5/7)	Fritz (2/9)	F. Cerúndolo (2/4)	Fritz (6/9)	Fritz (8/9)	Bergs (1/1)	
Antalya	Sonego (1/4)	Not an event	de Minaur (4/7)	Not an event					
Newport	Isner (14/15)	Cancelled	Anderson (6/6)	Cressy (1/1)	Mannarino (3/5)	Giron (1/1)	ATP Challenger Tour		
Gstaad	Ramos Viñolas (2/4)	Cancelled	Ruud (4/12)	Ruud (9/12)	Cachin (1/1)	Berrettini (7/8)	Bublik (4/7)	Tsitsipas (8/8)	
Båstad	Jarry (1/3)	Cancelled	Ruud (3/12)	F. Cerúndolo (1/4)	Rublev (8/10)	Borges (1/1)	Darderi (3/5)	Rublev (10/10)	
Los Cabos	Schwartzman (2/3)	Cancelled	Norrie (1/3)	Medvedev (7/12)	Tsitsipas (7/8)	Thompson (1/1)	Shapovalov (3/3)	Géa (1/1)	
Kitzbühel	Thiem (10/10)	Kecmanović (1/2)	Ruud (5/12)	Bautista Agut (10/11)	Báez (3/5)	Berrettini (8/8)	Bublik (5/7)	Halys (1/1)	
Umag	Lajović (1/2)	Cancelled	Alcaraz (1/2)	Sinner (5/6)	Popyrin (2/2)	F. Cerúndolo (3/4)	Darderi (4/5)	Mérida (1/1)	
Atlanta	de Minaur (2/7)	Cancelled	Isner (15/15)	de Minaur (6/7)	Fritz (4/9)	Nishioka (3/3)	Not an event		
Winston-Salem	Hurkacz (1/5)	Cancelled	Ivashka (1/1)	Mannarino (2/5)	Báez (4/5)	Sonego (4/4)	Fucsovics (3/3)	Buse (1/1)	
Chengdu	Carreño Busta (4/5)	Not an event			A. Zverev (8/8)	Shang (1/1)	Tabilo (3/3)	Davidovich Fokina (2/2)	
Zhuhai	de Minaur (3/7)	Cancelled			Khachanov (4/6)	Not an event			
Hangzhou	Not an event					Čilić (17/17)	Bublik (6/7)	Medvedev (11/12)	
St. Petersburg	Medvedev (4/12)	ATP Tour 500	Čilić (16/17)	Suspended due to Russian invasion of Ukraine					
Astana/Almaty	Not an event	Millman (1/1)	Kwon (1/2)	ATP Tour 500	Mannarino (4/5)	Khachanov (6/6)	Medvedev (9/12)	Medvedev (12/12)	
Stockholm	Shapovalov (1/3)	Cancelled	Paul (1/4)	Rune (2/3)	Monfils (9/10)	Paul (3/4)	Ruud (12/12)	Fritz (9/9)	
Antwerp/Brussels	Murray (17/17)	Humbert (2/5)	Sinner (4/6)	Auger-Aliassime (2/6)	Bublik (2/7)	Bautista Agut (11/11)	Auger-Aliassime (5/6)	Griekspoor (4/4)	
Metz	Tsonga (14/14)	Cancelled	Hurkacz (3/5)	Sonego (3/4)	Humbert (3/5)	Bonzi (1/1)	Tien (1/2)	Not an event	
Belgrade 2	Not an event		Djokovic (10/14)	Not an event		Shapovalov (2/3)	Not an event		
Gijón	Not an event			Rublev (7/10)	Not an event				
San Diego	Not an event		Ruud (6/12)	Nakashima (1/1)	Not an event				
Sofia	Medvedev (3/12)	Sinner (1/6)	Sinner (3/6)	Hüsler (1/1)	Mannarino (5/5)	Not an event			
Tel Aviv	Not an event			Djokovic (11/14)	Cancelled due to Gaza war	Not an event			
Seoul	Not an event			Nishioka (2/3)	Not an event				
Florence	Not an event			Auger-Aliassime (1/6)	Not an event				
Moscow	Rublev (2/10)	Cancelled	Karatsev (1/2)	Suspended due to Russian invasion of Ukraine					
Cologne 1	Not an event	A. Zverev (6/8)	Not an event						
Sardinia	Not an event	Djere (1/2)	Sonego (2/4)	Not an event					
Cologne 2	Not an event	A. Zverev (7/8)	Not an event						
Naples	Not an event			Musetti (1/2)	Not an event				
Athens	Not an event						Djokovic (14/14)	Not an event	

== Doubles champions ==
=== ATP World Tour 250 ===
	2009	2010	2011	2012	2013	2014	2015	2016	2017	2018
Brisbane	Gicquel (2/4); Tsonga (3/3)	Chardy (1/6); Gicquel (3/4)	Dlouhý (6/7); Hanley (15/17)	Mirnyi (14/20); Nestor (23/30)	Melo (11/17); Robredo (4/4)	Fyrstenberg (10/13); Nestor (26/30)	J. Murray (9/22); Peers (5/13)	Kontinen (6/12); Peers (6/13)	Kokkinakis (1/2); Thompson (1/6)	Kontinen (10/12); Peers (8/13)
Chennai/Pune	Butorac (4/16); R. Ram (1/15)	Granollers (4/12); Ventura (3/4)	Bhupathi (24/24); Paes (24/28)	Paes (25/28); Tipsarević (1/1)	Paire (1/1); Wawrinka (2/3)	Brunström (4/5); Nielsen (1/2)	Lu (3/3); Marray (1/2)	Marach (11/18); F. Martin (1/7)	Bopanna (8/14); Nedunchezhiyan (1/2)	Haase (3/9); Middelkoop (5/13)
Doha	M. López (1/6); Nadal (4/6)	García-López (1/3); Montañés (2/2)	M. López (3/6); Nadal (5/6)	Polášek (8/13); Rosol (1/3)	Kas (3/4); Kohlschreiber (5/5)	Berdych (1/1); Hájek (1/1)	Mónaco (3/3); Nadal (6/6)	F. López (2/2); M. López (6/6)	Chardy (4/6); F. Martin (3/7)	Marach (15/18); Pavić (8/24)
Sydney	B. Bryan (23/45); M. Bryan (25/47)	Nestor (21/30); Zimonjić (13/17)	Dlouhý (7/7); Hanley (16/17)	B. Bryan (33/45); M. Bryan (35/47)	B. Bryan (35/45); M. Bryan (37/47)	Nestor (27/30); Zimonjić (16/17)	Bopanna (6/14); Nestor (28/30)	J. Murray (10/22); Soares (14/19)	Koolhof (3/12); Middelkoop (3/13)	Kubot (11/12); Melo (14/17)
Auckland	Damm (25/26); Lindstedt (3/18)	Daniell (1/5); Tecău (1/22)	Granollers (6/12); Robredo (3/4)	Marach (9/18); Peya (1/8)	Fleming (6/8); Soares (9/19)	Knowle (15/17); Melo (12/17)	Klaasen (6/11); Paes (28/28)	Pavić (2/24); Venus (2/16)	Matkowski (12/12); Qureshi (9/14)	Marach (16/18); Pavić (9/24)
Montpellier/ Lyon	Benneteau (4/8); Mahut (3/15)	Huss (3/3); Hutchins (2/5)	Not an event	Mahut (4/15); Roger-Vasselin (1/20)	Gicquel (4/4); Llodra (13/13)	Davydenko (2/2); Istomin (2/3)	Daniell (2/5); Sitak (2/5)	Pavić (3/24); Venus (3/16)	A. Zverev (1/1); M. Zverev (2/2)	K. Skupski (4/6); N. Skupski (1/10)
Zagreb	Damm (26/26); Lindstedt (4/18)	Melzer (6/10); Petzschner (1/5)	Norman (4/4); Tecău (6/22)	Baghdatis (1/1); Youzhny (7/7)	Knowle (13/17); Polášek (10/13)	Rojer (8/21); Tecău (14/22)	Draganja (1/2); Kontinen (2/12)	Not an event		
Johannesburg	Cerretani (1/3); Norman (2/4)	Bopanna (2/14); Qureshi (1/14)	Cerretani (2/3); Shamasdin (1/3)	Not an event						
Santiago/ Viña del Mar	Cuevas (1/4); Dabul (1/1)	Kubot (4/12); Marach (5/18)	Melo (8/17); Soares (4/19)	Gimeno Traver (1/1); Gil (1/1)	Lorenzi (1/1); Starace (4/4)	Marach (10/18); Mergea (2/4)	Not an event			
Quito	Not an event						Kretschmer (1/1); Satschko (1/1)	Carreño Busta (1/1); Duran (1/4)	Cerretani (3/3); Oswald (3/10)	Jarry (1/1); Podlipnik-Castillo (1/1)
Sofia	Not an event							Koolhof (1/12); Middelkoop (1/13)	Troicki (2/2); Zimonjić (17/17)	Haase (4/9); Middelkoop (6/13)
San Jose	Haas (1/1); Štěpánek (9/10)	Fish (5/5); Querrey (1/3)	Lipsky (4/15); R. Ram (5/15)	Knowles (19/19); Malisse (5/7)	Malisse (7/7); Moser (1/1)	Not an event				
Memphis/ New York	ATP World Tour 500					Butorac (13/16); Klaasen (4/11)	Fyrstenberg (12/13); S. González (9/21)	Fyrstenberg (13/13); S. González (10/21)	Baker (1/2); Mektic (1/15)	Mirnyi (19/20); Oswald (6/10)
Buenos Aires	Granollers (2/12); A. Martín (3/3)	S. Prieto (9/9); Zeballos (1/12)	Marach (7/18); Mayer (1/1)	Marrero (2/7); Verdasco (2/4)	Bolelli (3/10); Fognini (2/6)	Granollers (8/12); M. López (5/6)	Nieminen (5/5); Sá (8/11)	Cabal (4/10); Farah (4/9)	Cabal (7/10); Farah (7/9)	Molteni (4/13); Zeballos (8/12)
Marseille	Clément (9/9); Llodra (11/13)	Benneteau (5/8); Llodra (12/13)	Haase (1/9); K. Skupski (3/6)	Mahut (5/15); Roger-Vasselin (2/20)	Bopanna (5/14); Fleming (7/8)	Benneteau (6/8); Roger-Vasselin (6/20)	Draganja (2/2); Kontinen (3/12)	Pavić (4/24); Venus (4/16)	Benneteau (7/8); Mahut (8/15)	Klaasen (9/11); Venus (7/16)
Delray Beach	B. Bryan (24/45); M. Bryan (26/47)	B. Bryan (27/45); M. Bryan (29/47)	Lipsky (5/15); R. Ram (6/15)	Fleming (4/8); Hutchins (4/5)	Blake (6/6); Sock (1/6)	B. Bryan (37/45); M. Bryan (39/47)	B. Bryan (39/45); M. Bryan (41/47)	Marach (12/18); F. Martin (2/7)	Klaasen (8/11); R. Ram (9/15)	Sock (4/6); Withrow (1/9)
Costa do Sauípe /São Paulo	Granollers (1/12); Robredo (2/4)	Cuevas (3/4); Granollers (5/12)	Melo (9/17); Soares (5/19)	Butorac (11/16); Soares (6/19)	Peya (3/8); Soares (10/19)	García-López (2/3); Oswald (1/10)	Cabal (2/10); Farah (2/9)	Peralta (1/5); Zeballos (3/12)	Sá (11/11); Dutra Silva (1/1)	Delbonis (1/2); M. Gonzalez (4/13)
Houston	B. Bryan (25/45); M. Bryan (27/47)	B. Bryan (28/45); M. Bryan (30/47)	B. Bryan (30/45); M. Bryan (32/47)	Blake (5/6); Querrey (2/3)	J. Murray (5/22); Peers (1/13)	B. Bryan (38/45); M. Bryan (40/47)	Berankis (1/1); Gabashvili (1/1)	B. Bryan (41/45); M. Bryan (43/47)	Peralta (4/5); Zeballos (7/12)	Mirnyi (20/20); Oswald (7/10)
Casablanca/ Marrakesh	Kubot (1/12); Marach (2/18)	Lindstedt (5/18); Tecău (2/22)	Lindstedt (9/18); Tecău (7/22)	D. Brown (2/2); Hanley (17/17)	Knowle (14/17); Polášek (11/13)	Rojer (9/21); Tecău (15/22)	Junaid (1/1); Shamasdin (2/3)	Duran (2/4); M. Gonzalez (3/13)	Inglot (5/11); Pavić (6/24)	Mektic (3/15); Peya (8/8)
Bucharest	Čermák (16/26); Mertiňák (8/10)	Chela (3/3); Kubot (5/12)	Bracciali (5/6); Starace (3/4)	Lindstedt (11/18); Tecău (9/22)	Mirnyi (16/20); Tecău (12/22)	Rojer (10/21); Tecău (16/22)	Copil (1/1); Ungur (1/1)	Mergea (4/4); Tecău (19/22)	Not an event	
Budapest	Not an event								Baker (2/2); Mektic (2/15)	Inglot (6/11); Skugor (1/4)
Belgrade	Kubot (2/12); Marach (3/18)	S. González (1/21); Rettenmaier (1/1)	Čermák (18/26); Polášek (5/13)	Erlich (13/18); A. Ram (13/13)	Not an event					
Munich	Hernych (1/1); Minář (1/1)	Marach (6/18); Ventura (4/4)	Bolelli (1/10); Zeballos (2/12)	Čermák (22/26); Polášek (9/13)	Nieminen (3/5); Tursunov (4/5)	J. Murray (8/22); Peers (4/13)	Peya (6/8); Soares (13/19)	Kontinen (7/12); Peers (7/13)	Cabal (8/10); Farah (8/9)	Dodig (1/6); R. Ram (12/15)
Estoril/Oeiras	Butorac (5/16); Lipsky (2/15)	M. López (2/6); Marrero (1/7)	Butorac (8/16); Rojer (2/21)	Qureshi (5/14); Rojer (5/21)	S. González (5/21); Lipsky (8/15)	S. González (7/21); Lipsky (10/15)	Huey (2/5); Lipsky (12/15)	Butorac (16/16); Lipsky (14/15)	Harrison (2/3); Venus (6/16)	Edmund (1/1); Norrie (1/1)
Istanbul	Not an event						Albot (1/1); Lajovic (1/2)	Cipolla (1/1); Sela (1/1)	Jebavy (1/4); Vesely (2/2)	Inglot (7/11); Lindstedt (17/18)
Düsseldorf	Team event				Begemann (2/4); Emmrich (2/3)	S. González (8/21); Lipsky (11/15)	Not an event			
Geneva	Not an event						Cabal (3/10); Farah (3/9)	S. Johnson (1/2); Querrey (3/3)	Rojer (13/21); Tecău (20/22)	Marach (17/18); Pavić (10/24)
Lyon	Not an event								Molteni (2/13); Shamasdin (3/3)	Kyrgios (1/2); Sock (5/6)
Nice	Not an event	Melo (7/17); Soares (3/19)	Butorac (9/16); Rojer (3/21)	B. Bryan (34/45); M. Bryan (36/47)	Brunström (2/5); Klaasen (1/11)	Kližan (2/3); Oswald (2/10)	Pavić (1/24); Venus (1/16)	Cabal (5/10); Farah (5/9)	Not an event	
's-Hertogenbosch	Moodie (5/5); Norman (3/4)	Lindstedt (6/18); Tecău (3/22)	Bracciali (3/6); Čermák (19/26)	Lindstedt (12/18); Tecău (10/22)	Mirnyi (17/20); Tecău (13/22)	Rojer (11/21); Tecău (17/22)	Karlović (1/1); Kubot (7/12)	Pavić (5/24); Venus (5/16)	Kubot (10/12); Melo (13/17)	Inglot (8/11); Skugor (2/4)
Stuttgart	Čermák (14/26); Mertiňák (6/10)	Berlocq (1/2); Schwank (1/1)	Melzer (7/10); Petzschner (2/5)	Chardy (2/6); Kubot (6/12)	Bagnis (1/1); Bellucci (1/1)	Kowalczyk (1/1); Sitak (1/5)	Bopanna (7/14); Mergea (3/4)	Daniell (3/5); Sitak (3/5)	J. Murray (11/22); Soares (15/19)	Petzschner (5/5); Pütz (1/4)
Halle	Kas (1/4); Kohlschreiber (4/5)	Stakhovsky (2/3); Youzhny (6/7)	Bopanna (3/14); Qureshi (2/14)	Qureshi (6/14); Rojer (6/21)	S. González (6/21); Lipsky (9/15)	Begemann (3/4); Knowle (16/17)	ATP World Tour 500			
London	Moodie (4/5); Youzhny (5/7)	Djokovic (1/1); Erlich (10/18)	B. Bryan (31/45); M. Bryan (33/47)	Mirnyi (15/20); Nestor (24/30)	B. Bryan (36/45); M. Bryan (38/47)	Peya (5/8); Soares (12/19)	ATP World Tour 500			
Eastbourne	Fyrstenberg (7/13); Matkowski (7/12)	Fyrstenberg (9/13); Matkowski (9/12)	Erlich (11/18); A. Ram (11/13)	Fleming (5/8); Hutchins (5/5)	Peya (4/8); Soares (11/19)	Huey (1/5); Inglot (1/11)	Not an event		B. Bryan (42/45); M. Bryan (44/47)	Bambridge (1/3); O'Mara (1/3)
Nottingham	ATP Challenger Tour						Guccione (4/5); Sá (9/11)	Inglot (3/11); Nestor (29/30)	Not an event	
Antalya	Not an event								Lindstedt (16/18); Qureshi (10/14)	Demoliner (1/5); S. González (11/21)
Newport	Kerr (8/8); R. Ram (2/15)	Ball (1/1); Guccione (1/5)	Ebden (1/7); Harrison (1/3)	S. González (3/21); Lipsky (6/15)	Mahut (7/15); Roger-Vasselin (4/20)	Guccione (2/5); Hewitt (1/1)	Marray (2/2); Qureshi (8/14)	Guccione (5/5); Groth (2/2)	Qureshi (11/14); R. Ram (10/15)	Erlich (16/18); Sitak (4/5)
Båstad	Levinský (5/5); Polášek (3/13)	Lindstedt (7/18); Tecău (4/22)	Lindstedt (10/18); Tecău (8/22)	Lindstedt (13/18); Tecău (11/22)	Monroe (1/4); Stadler (1/1)	Brunström (5/5); Monroe (2/4)	Chardy (3/6); Kubot (8/12)	Granollers (9/12); Marrero (6/7)	Knowle (17/17); Petzschner (4/5)	Peralta (5/5); Zeballos (9/12)
Umag	Čermák (15/26); Mertiňák (7/10)	Friedl (12/12); Polášek (4/13)	Bolelli (2/10); Fognini (1/6)	Marrero (3/7); Verdasco (3/4)	Kližan (1/3); Marrero (4/7)	Čermák (25/26); Rosol (3/3)	M. Gonzalez (2/13); Sá (10/11)	Kližan (3/3); Marrero (7/7)	Duran (3/4); Molteni (3/13)	Haase (5/9); Middelkoop (7/13)
Bogota	Not an event				Raja (1/2); Sharan (1/5)	Guccione (3/5); Groth (1/2)	Roger-Vasselin (7/20); Štěpánek (10/10)	Not an event		
Gstaad	Chiudinelli (1/1); Lammer (1/1)	Brunström (1/5); Nieminen (2/5)	Čermák (20/26); Polášek (6/13)	Granollers (7/12); M. López (4/6)	J. Murray (6/22); Peers (2/13)	Begemann (4/4); Haase (2/9)	Bury (1/1); Istomin (3/3)	Peralta (2/5); Zeballos (4/12)	Marach (13/18); Oswald (4/10)	Bracciali (6/6); Berrettini (1/2)
Atlanta/ Indianapolis	Gulbis (2/2); Tursunov (2/5)	Lipsky (3/15); R. Ram (4/15)	Bogomolov (1/1); Ebden (2/7)	Ebden (3/7); Harrison (2/3)	Roger-Vasselin (5/20); Sijsling (1/1)	Pospisil (1/2); Sock (2/6)	B. Bryan (40/45); M. Bryan (42/47)	Molteni (1/13); Zeballos (5/12)	B. Bryan (43/45); M. Bryan (45/47)	Monroe (4/4); Smith (1/2)
Kitzbühel	Melo (6/17); Sá (6/11)	ATP Challenger Tour	Bracciali (4/6); S. González (2/21)	Čermák (23/26); Knowle (12/17)	Emmrich (3/3); Kas (4/4)	Kontinen (1/12); Nieminen (4/5)	Almagro (1/1); Berlocq (2/2)	Koolhof (2/12); Middelkoop (2/13)	Cuevas (4/4); Duran (4/4)	Jebavy (3/4); Molteni (5/13)
Los Angeles	B. Bryan (26/45); M. Bryan (28/47)	B. Bryan (29/45); M. Bryan (31/47)	Knowles (18/19); Malisse (4/7)	Bemelmans (1/1); Malisse (6/7)	Not an event					
Los Cabos	Not an event							Raja (2/2); Sharan (2/5)	Cabal (9/10); Huey (5/5)	Arévalo (1/9); Reyes-Varela (1/2)
New Haven/ Winston-Salem	Knowle (11/17); Melzer (5/10)	Lindstedt (8/18); Tecău (5/22)	Erlich (12/18); A. Ram (12/13)	S. González (4/21); Lipsky (7/15)	Nestor (25/30); Paes (26/28)	Cabal (1/10); Farah (1/9)	Inglot (2/11); Lindstedt (14/18)	García-López (3/3); Kontinen (8/12)	Rojer (14/21); Tecău (21/22)	Rojer (15/21); Tecău (22/22)
Metz	Fleming (1/8); K. Skupski (1/6)	D. Brown (1/2); Wassen (5/5)	J. Murray (4/22); Sá (7/11)	Mahut (6/15); Roger-Vasselin (3/20)	Brunström (3/5); Klaasen (2/11)	Fyrstenberg (11/13); Matkowski (10/12)	Kubot (9/12); Roger-Vasselin (8/20)	Peralta (3/5); Zeballos (6/12)	Benneteau (8/8); Roger-Vasselin (10/20)	Mahut (9/15); Roger-Vasselin (11/20)
St. Petersburg	Fleming (2/8); K. Skupski (2/6)	Bracciali (2/6); Starace (2/4)	Fleming (3/8); Hutchins (3/5)	R. Ram (7/15); Zimonjić (15/17)	Marrero (5/7); Verdasco (4/4)	Not an event	Huey (3/5); Kontinen (4/12)	Inglot (4/11); Kontinen (9/12)	Jebavy (2/4); Middelkoop (4/13)	Berrettini (2/2); Fognini (4/6)
Shenzhen	Not an event					Rojer (12/21); Tecău (18/22)	Erlich (14/18); Fleming (8/8)	Fognini (3/6); Lindstedt (15/18)	Peya (7/8); R. Ram (11/15)	McLachlan (1/4); Salisbury (1/4)
Chengdu	Not an event							Klaasen (7/11); R. Ram (8/15)	Erlich (15/18); Qureshi (12/14)	Dodig (2/6); Pavić (11/24)
Kuala Lumpur	Fyrstenberg (8/13); Matkowski (8/13)	Čermák (17/26); Mertiňák (9/10)	Butorac (10/16); Rojer (4/21)	Peya (2/8); Soares (7/19)	Butorac (12/16); Klaasen (3/11)	Matkowski (11/12); Paes (27/28)	Huey (4/5); Kontinen (5/12)	Not an event		
Bangkok	Butorac (6/16); R. Ram (3/15)	Kas (2/4); Troicki (1/2)	Marach (8/18); Qureshi (3/14)	Lu (2/3); Udomchoke (1/1)	J. Murray (7/22); Peers (3/13)	Not an event				
Moscow	Cuevas (2/4); Granollers (3/12)	Kunitsyn (1/1); Tursunov (3/5)	Čermák (21/26); Polášek (7/13)	Čermák (24/26); Mertiňák (10/10)	Elgin (1/1); Istomin (1/3)	Čermák (26/26); Veselý (1/2)	Rublev (1/3); Tursunov (5/5)	Cabal (6/10); Farah (6/9)	Mirnyi (18/20); Oswald (5/10)	Krajicek (1/9); R. Ram (13/15)
Stockholm	Soares (2/19); Ullyett (23/23)	Butorac (7/16); Rojer (1/21)	Bopanna (4/14); Qureshi (4/14)	Melo (10/17); Soares (8/19)	Qureshi (7/14); Rojer (7/21)	Butorac (14/16); Klaasen (5/11)	Monroe (3/4); Sock (3/6)	E. Ymer (1/1); M. Ymer (1/1)	Marach (14/18); Pavić (7/24)	Bambridge (2/3); O'Mara (2/3)
Antwerp	Not an event							Nestor (30/30); Roger-Vasselin (9/20)	Lipsky (15/15); Sharan (3/5)	Mahut (10/15); Roger-Vasselin (12/20)
Vienna	Kubot (3/12); Marach (4/18)	Nestor (22/30); Zimonjić (14/17)	B. Bryan (32/45); M. Bryan (34/47)	Begemann (1/4); Emmrich (1/3)	Mergea (1/4); Rosol (2/3)	Melzer (8/10); Petzschner (3/5)	ATP World Tour 500			
Valencia	ATP World Tour 500						Butorac (15/16); Lipsky (13/15)	Not an event		

=== ATP 250 tournaments ===
	2019	2020	2021	2022	2023	2024	2025	2026	2027
Brisbane	Daniell (4/5); Koolhof (4/12)	ATP Cup			United Cup	Glasspool (3/6); Rojer (21/21)	J. Cash (3/5); Glasspool (4/6)	Cabral (6/7); Miedler (8/10)	
Hong Kong	Not an event					Arévalo (8/9); Pavić (23/24)	Arends (3/5); L. Johnson (2/3)	Musetti (1/1); Sonego (3/3)	
Adelaide/Melbourne 1	Not an event	M. González (7/13); F. Martin (6/7)	J. Murray (14/22); Soares (18/19)	Bopanna (11/14); Ramanathan (1/2)	Glasspool (2/6); Heliövaara (3/7)	Ram (15/15); Salisbury (4/4)	Bolelli (10/10); Vavassori (5/5)	Heliövaara (7/7); Patten (4/4)	
Melbourne 2	Not an event		Mektić (6/15); Pavić (15/24)	Koolhof (7/12); N. Skupski (5/10)	Not an event				
Sydney	J. Murray (12/22); Soares (16/19)	ATP Cup		Peers (12/13); Polášek (13/13)	United Cup				
Auckland	McLachlan (2/4); Struff (1/3)	Bambridge (3/3); McLachlan (3/4)	Cancelled	Cancelled	Mektić (10/15); Pavić (20/24)	Mektić (13/15); Koolhof (12/12)	Mektić (14/15); Venus (16/16)	Arribagé (3/5); Olivetti (4/6)	
Adelaide 2	Not an event			Koolhof (8/12); N. Skupski (6/10)	Arévalo (6/9); Rojer (19/21)	Not an event			
Pune	Bopanna (9/14); Sharan (4/5)	Göransson (1/2); Rungkat (1/1)	Cancelled	Bopanna (12/14); Ramanathan (2/2)	Gillé (6/7); Vliegen (6/7)	Not an event			
Montpellier	Dodig (3/6); Roger-Vasselin (13/20)	Ćaćić (2/3); Pavić (13/24)	Kontinen (12/12); Roger-Vasselin (16/20)	Herbert (3/5); Mahut (14/15)	Haase (7/9); Middelkoop (13/13)	Doumbia (2/7); Reboul (2/7)	Haase (8/9) van de Zandschulp (2/2)	Arribagé (4/5); Olivetti (5/6)	
Córdoba	Jebavy (4/4); Molteni (6/13)	Demoliner (3/5); Middelkoop (9/13)	Matos (1/11); Meligeni Alves (1/2)	S. González (16/21); Molteni (9/13)	M. Gonzalez (12/13); Molteni (12/13)	M. Gonzalez (13/13); Molteni (13/13)	Not an event		
Singapore	Not an event		Gillé (5/7); Vliegen (5/7)	Not an event					
New York/Dallas	Krawietz (1/4); Mies (1/4)	Inglot (11/11); Qureshi (14/14)	Cancelled	Arévalo (3/9); Rojer (16/21)	J. Murray (17/22); Venus (10/16)	Purcell (3/5); Thompson (3/6)	ATP Tour 500		
Marseille	Chardy (5/6); F. Martin (4/7)	Mahut (11/15); Pospisil (2/2)	Glasspool (1/6); Heliövaara (1/7)	Molchanov (1/2); Rublev (3/3)	S. González (18/21); Roger-Vasselin (18/20)	Macháč (1/1); Zhang (1/1)	Bonzi (1/1); Herbert (4/5)	Not an event	
Buenos Aires	M. Gonzalez (5/13); Zeballos (10/12)	Granollers (11/12); Zeballos (11/12)	Brkić (1/2); Ćaćić (3/3)	S. González (17/21); Molteni (10/13)	Bolelli (8/10); Fognini (6/6)	Bolelli (9/10); Vavassori (4/5)	Andreozzi (2/3); Arribagé (1/5)	Luz (2/3); Matos (10/11)	
Doha	Goffin (1/1); Herbert (1/5)	Bopanna (10/14); Koolhof (5/12)	Karatsev (1/1); Rublev (2/3)	Koolhof (9/12); N. Skupski (7/10)	Bopanna (14/14); Ebden (6/7)	J. Murray (21/22); Venus (14/16)	ATP Tour 500		
Delray Beach	B. Bryan (44/45); M. Bryan (46/47)	B. Bryan (45/45); M. Bryan (47/47)	Behar (1/3); Escobar (1/6)	Arévalo (4/9); Rojer (17/21)	Arévalo (7/9); Rojer (20/21)	J. Cash (1/5); Galloway (1/4)	Kecmanović (2/2); Nakashima (1/1)	Krajicek (9/9); Mektić (15/15)	
São Paulo	Delbonis (2/2); M. Gonzalez (6/13)	Not an event							
Santiago	Not an event	Carballés Baena (1/1); Davidovich Fokina (1/1)	Bolelli (4/10); M. González (8/13)	Matos (2/11); Meligeni Alves (2/2)	Pellegrino (1/1); Vavassori (2/5)	Barrios Vera (1/1); Tabilo (1/1)	Barrientos (1/1); Bollipalli (2/2)	Luz (3/3); Matos (11/11)	
Andalucia	Not an event		Behar (2/3); Escobar (2/6)	Not an event					
Banja Luka	Not an event				J. Murray (18/22); Venus (11/16)	Not an event			
Belgrade	Not an event		I. Sabanov (1/1); M. Sabanov (1/1)	Behar (3/3); Escobar (3/6)	Not an event				
Houston	S. González (12/21); Qureshi (13/14)	Cancelled due to the coronavirus pandemic	Cancelled	Ebden (4/7); Purcell (1/5)	Purcell (2/5); Thompson (2/6)	Purcell (5/5); Thompson (5/6)	Romboli (2/2); Smith (2/2)	Andrade (1/1); Shelton (1/1)	
Marrakesh	Melzer (10/10); Skugor (3/4)	Cancelled due to the coronavirus pandemic	Cancelled	Matos (3/11); Vega Hernández (2/5)	Demoliner (5/5); Vavassori (3/5)	Heliövaara (4/7); Patten (1/4)	Nouza (1/3); Rikl (1/3)	R. Cash (2/2); Tracy (2/3)	
Budapest	K. Skupski (5/6); N. Skupski (2/10)	Cancelled due to the coronavirus pandemic	Not an event						
Munich	Nielsen (2/2); Pütz (2/4)	Cancelled due to the coronavirus pandemic	Krawietz (3/4); Koolhof (6/12)	Krawietz (4/4); Mies (3/4)	Erler (2/6); Miedler (2/10)	Bhambri (2/4); Olivetti (1/6)	ATP Tour 500		
Bucharest	Not an event					Doumbia (3/7); Reboul (3/7)	Granollers (12/12); Zeballos (12/12)	Doumbia (6/7); Reboul (6/7)	
Estoril	Chardy (6/6); F. Martin (5/7)	Cancelled due to the coronavirus pandemic	Nys (2/6); Pütz (3/4)	Borges (1/1); Cabral (1/7)	Gillé (7/7); Vliegen (7/7)	Escobar (6/6); Nedovyesov (3/3)	ATP Challenger Tour	Droguet (1/1); Jacquet (1/1)	
Geneva	Marach (18/18); Pavić (12/24)	Cancelled due to the coronavirus pandemic	Peers (11/13); Venus (9/16)	Mektic (8/15); Pavić (17/24)	J. Murray (19/22); Venus (12/16)	Arévalo (9/9); Pavić (24/24)	Doumbia (5/7); Reboul (5/7)	Arneodo (3/3); Polmans (1/3)	
Lyon	Dodig (4/6); Roger-Vasselin (14/20)	Cancelled due to the coronavirus pandemic	Nys (3/6); Pütz (4/4)	Dodig (5/6); Krajicek (5/9)	Ram (14/15); Salisbury (3/4)	Heliövaara (5/7); Patten (2/4)	Not an event	J. Cash (5/5); Glasspool (6/6)	
Parma	ATP Challenger Tour		Bolelli (5/10); M. González (9/13)	ATP Challenger Tour					
's-Hertogenbosch	Inglot (9/11); Krajicek (2/9)	Cancelled due to the coronavirus pandemic	Cancelled	Koolhof (10/12); N. Skupski (8/10)	Koolhof (11/12); N. Skupski (9/10)	Lammons (7/9); Withrow (7/9)	Ebden (7/7); Thompson (6/6)	Arends (5/5); Pel (2/2)	
Stuttgart	Peers (9/13); Soares (17/19)	Cancelled due to the coronavirus pandemic	Demoliner (4/5); S. González (13/21)	Hurkacz (2/2); Pavić (18/24)	Mektić (11/15); Pavić (21/24)	Matos (7/11); Melo (16/17)	S. González (20/21); Krajicek (7/9)	Hanfmann (1/1); Struff (3/3)	
Eastbourne	Cabal (10/10); Farah (9/9)	Cancelled due to the coronavirus pandemic	Mektić (7/15); Pavić (16/24)	Mektić (9/15); Pavić (19/24)	Mektić (12/15); Pavić (22/24)	N. Skupski (10/10); Venus (15/16)	J. Cash (4/5); Glasspool (5/6)	Arribagé (5/5); Olivetti (6/6)	
Mallorca	Not an event	Cancelled due to the coronavirus pandemic	Bolelli (6/10); M. González (10/13)	Matos (4/11); Vega Hernández (3/5)	Bhambri (1/4); Harris (1/1)	J. Cash (2/5); Galloway (2/4)	S. González (21/21); Krajicek (8/9)	Nys (6/6); Roger-Vasselin (20/20)	
Antalya	Erlich (17/18); Sitak (5/5)	Not an event	Mektić (5/15); Pavić (14/24)	Not an event					
Newport	Granollers (10/12); Stakhovsky (3/3)	Cancelled due to the coronavirus pandemic	Blumberg (1/3); Sock (6/6)	Blumberg (2/3); S. Johnson (2/2)	Lammons (3/9); Withrow (3/9)	Göransson (2/2); Verbeek (1/1)	ATP Challenger Tour		
Båstad	Gillé (1/7); Vliegen (1/7)	Cancelled due to the coronavirus pandemic	Arends (1/5); Pel (1/2)	Matos (5/11); Vega Hernández (4/5)	Escobar (4/6); Nedovyesov (1/3)	Luz (1/3); Matos (8/11)	Andreozzi (3/3); Arends (4/5)	Doumbia (7/7); Reboul (7/7)	
Umag	Haase (6/9); Oswald (8/10)	Cancelled due to the coronavirus pandemic	Romboli (1/3); Vega Hernández (1/5)	Bolelli (7/10); Fognini (5/6)	Rola (1/1); Serdarušić (1/1)	Andreozzi (1/3); Reyes-Varela (2/2)	Arneodo (2/3); Guinard (1/1)	Pavlásek (1/1); Rikl (3/3)	
Gstaad	Gillé (2/7); Vliegen (2/7)	Cancelled due to the coronavirus pandemic	Hüsler (1/1); Stricker (1/2)	Brkić (2/2); Cabral (2/7)	Stricker (2/2); Wawrinka (2/2)	Bhambri (3/4); Olivetti (2/6)	Cabral (3/7); Miedler (5/10)	Miedler (9/10); Polmans (2/3)	
Atlanta	Inglot (10/11); Krajicek (3/9)	Cancelled due to the coronavirus pandemic	Opelka (1/1); Sinner (1/1)	Kokkinakis (2/2); Kyrgios (2/2)	Lammons (4/9); Withrow (4/9)	Lammons (8/9); Withrow (8/9)	Not an event		
Los Cabos	Arneodo (1/3); Nys (1/6)	Cancelled due to the coronavirus pandemic	Hach Verdugo (1/1); Isner (2/2)	Blumberg (3/3); Kecmanović (1/2)	S. González (19/21); Roger-Vasselin (19/20)	Purcell (4/5); Thompson (4/6)	R. Cash (1/2); Tracy (1/3)	Seggerman (1/2); Trhac (1/1)	
Kitzbühel	Oswald (9/10); Polášek (12/13)	Krajicek (4/9); Škugor (4/4)	Erler (1/6); Miedler (1/10)	Martínez (1/1); Sonego (2/3)	Erler (3/6); Miedler (3/10)	Erler (4/6); Mies (4/4)	Nouza (2/3); Rikl (2/3)	Miedler (10/10); Polmans (3/3)	
Winston-Salem	Kubot (12/12); Melo (15/17)	Cancelled	Arévalo (2/9); Middelkoop (10/13)	Ebden (5/7); J. Murray (16/22)	Lammons (5/9); Withrow (5/9)	Lammons (9/9); Withrow (9/9)	Matos (9/11); Melo (17/17)	Nouza (3/3); Oberleitner (1/1)	
St. Petersburg	Sharan (5/5); Zelenay (1/1)	ATP Tour 500	J. Murray (15/22); Soares (19/19)	Suspended due to Russian invasion of Ukraine					
Zhuhai	Gillé (3/7); Vliegen (3/7)	Cancelled			J. Murray (20/22); Venus (13/16)	Not an event			
Chengdu	Čačić (1/3); Lajović (2/2)	Cancelled			Doumbia (1/7); Reboul (1/7)	Doumbia (4/7); Reboul (4/7)	Frantzen (1/2); Haase (9/9)	L. Johnson (3/3); Zieliński (4/4)	
Hangzhou	Not an event					Nedunchezhiyan (2/2); Prashanth (1/1)	Cabral (4/7); Miedler (6/10)	Cabral (7/7); Tracy (3/3)	
Sofia	Mektić (4/15); Melzer (9/10)	J. Murray (13/22); N. Skupski (3/10)	O'Mara (3/3); K. Skupski (6/6)	Matos (6/11); Vega Hernández (5/5)	Escobar (5/6); Nedovyesov (2/3)	Not an event			
San Diego	Not an event		Salisbury (2/4); N. Skupski (4/10)	Lammons (1/9); Withrow (2/9)	Not an event				
Moscow	Demoliner (2/5); Middelkoop (8/13)	Cancelled	Heliövaara (2/7); Middelkoop (11/13)	Suspended due to Russian invasion of Ukraine					
Stockholm	Kontinen (11/12); Roger-Vasselin (15/20)	Cancelled	S. González (15/21); Molteni (8/13)	Arévalo (5/9); Rojer (18/21)	Golubev (1/1); Molchanov (2/2)	Heliövaara (6/7); Patten (3/4)	Erler (6/6); Galloway (3/4)	Grevelius (1/1); Heinonen (1/1)	
Antwerp/Brussels	Krawietz (2/4); Mies (2/4)	Peers (10/13); Venus (8/16)	Mahut (13/15); F. Martin (7/7)	Griekspoor (1/1) van de Zandschulp (1/2)	P. Tsitsipas (1/1); S. Tsitsipas (1/1)	Erler (5/6); Miedler (4/10)	Harrison (1/1); King (1/1)	Frantzen (2/2); Galloway (4/4)	
Astana/Almaty	Not an event	Gillé (4/7); Vliegen (4/7)	S. González (14/21); Molteni (7/13)	ATP Tour 500	Lammons (6/9); Withrow (6/9)	Bollipalli (1/2); Kadhe (1/1)	Arribagé (2/5); Olivetti (3/6)	Bhambri (4/4); Seggerman (2/2)	
Metz	Lindstedt (18/18); Struff (2/3)	Cancelled	Hurkacz (1/2); Zieliński (1/4)	Nys (4/6); Zieliński (2/4)	Nys (5/6); Zieliński (3/4)	Arends (2/5); L. Johnson (1/3)	Halys (1/1); Herbert (5/5)	Not an event	
Gijón	Not an event			M. Gonzalez (11/13); Molteni (11/13)	Not an event				
Tel Aviv	Not an event			Bopanna (13/14); Middelkoop (12/13)	Cancelled due to Gaza war	Not an event			
Belgrade 2	Not an event		Erlich (18/18); Vasilevski (1/1)	Not an event		J. Murray (22/22); Peers (13/13)	Not an event		
Cologne I	Not an event	Herbert (2/5); Mahut (12/15)	Not an event						
Sardinia	Not an event	Daniell (5/5); Oswald (10/10)	Sonego (1/3); Vavassori (1/5)	Not an event					
Cologne II	Not an event	Klaasen (10/11); McLachlan (4/4)	Not an event						
Seoul	Not an event			Klaasen (11/11); Lammons (2/9)	Not an event				
Florence	Not an event			Mahut (15/15); Roger-Vasselin (17/20)	Not an event				
Naples	Not an event			Dodig (6/6); Krajicek (6/9)	Not an event				
Athens	Not an event						Cabral (5/7); Miedler (7/10)	Not an event	

== Statistics ==
Active players indicated in bold.

=== Most titles ===
Titles	Singles player
26	Thomas Muster
25	Roger Federer
22	Lleyton Hewitt
21	Andy Roddick
20	Pete Sampras
19	Yevgeny Kafelnikov
19	Michael Chang
19	Andre Agassi
17	Andy Murray
17	**Marin Čilić**

Titles	Doubles player
47	Mike Bryan
45	Bob Bryan
34	Todd Woodbridge
30	Daniel Nestor
29	Paul Haarhuis
28	Leander Paes
26	Jonas Björkman
26	František Čermák
26	Martin Damm
24	Mark Woodforde
24	Mahesh Bhupathi
24	**Mate Pavić**

== See also ==
- Grand Slam (tennis)
- ATP Finals
- ATP Masters 1000
- ATP 500
- WTA 250
