= 2020 Bett1Hulks Indoors =

- Date: 12–18 October
- Edition: 1st
- Category: ATP Tour 250
- Draw: 28S / 16D
- Prize money: €325,610
- Surface: Hard / indoors
- Location: Cologne, Germany
- Venue: Lanxess Arena

Champions

Singles
- (Germany) Alexander Zverev

Doubles
- (France) Pierre-Hugues Herbert / (France) Nicolas Mahut
- Bett1Hulks Indoors

The 2020 Bett1Hulks Indoors was an ATP tournament organized for male professional tennis players, held in Cologne, Germany, in mid-October 2020 on indoor hard courts. It was primarily organized due to the cancellation of many tournaments during the 2020 season due to the COVID-19 pandemic. It was the first and only edition of the tournament and took place at the Lanxess Arena in Cologne, Germany, from October 12 through 18, 2020.

== Singles main-draw entrants ==
=== Seeds ===
Country	Player	Rank^{1}	Seed
GER	Alexander Zverev	7	1
ESP	Roberto Bautista Agut	10	2
CAN	Félix Auger-Aliassime	22	3
FRA	Benoît Paire	26	4
SRB	Filip Krajinović	29	5
POL	Hubert Hurkacz	31	6
GER	Jan-Lennard Struff	32	7
CRO	Marin Čilić	40	8

- Rankings are as of September 28, 2020.

=== Other entrants ===
The following players received wildcards into the singles main draw:

- (Germany) Daniel Altmaier
- (United Kingdom) Andy Murray
- (Germany) Mischa Zverev

The following players received entry from the qualifying draw:

- (South Africa) Lloyd Harris
- (Switzerland) Henri Laaksonen
- (Germany) Oscar Otte
- (Finland) Emil Ruusuvuori

The following players received entry as a lucky loser:

- (Australia) Marc Polmans
- (United States) Marcos Giron

=== Withdrawals ===
Before the tournament

- (Slovenia) Aljaž Bedene → replaced by (Australia) Marc Polmans
- (Lithuania) Ričardas Berankis → replaced by (United States) Marcos Giron
- (France) Gaël Monfils → replaced by (Austria) Dennis Novak
- (Japan) Yoshihito Nishioka → replaced by (Spain) Alejandro Davidovich Fokina

== Doubles main-draw entrants ==
=== Seeds ===
Country	Player	Country	Player	Rank^{1}	Seed
POL	Łukasz Kubot	BRA	Marcelo Melo	18	1
FRA	Pierre-Hugues Herbert	FRA	Nicolas Mahut	28	2
RSA	Raven Klaasen	AUT	Oliver Marach	39	3
MEX	Santiago González	GBR	Ken Skupski	98	4

- Rankings are as of September 28, 2020

=== Other entrants ===
The following pairs received wildcards into the doubles main draw:

- (Germany) Daniel Masur / (Germany) Rudolf Molleker
- (Germany) Alexander Zverev / (Germany) Mischa Zverev

=== Withdrawals ===
During the tournament

- (Lithuania) Ričardas Berankis

== Champions ==
All dates and times are CEST (UTC+2)

=== Singles ===
- (Germany) Alexander Zverev def. (Canada) Félix Auger-Aliassime, 6–3, 6–3

=== Doubles ===
- (France) Pierre-Hugues Herbert / (France) Nicolas Mahut def. (Poland) Łukasz Kubot / (Brazil) Marcelo Melo, 6–4, 6–4

== See also ==
- 2020 Bett1Hulks Championship
