= Stefanos Tsitsipas career statistics =

Career finals
Discipline	Type	Won	Lost	Total	WR^{1}
Singles	Grand Slam	–	2	2	0.00
Singles	ATP Finals	1	–	1	1.00
Singles	ATP 1000	3	4	7	0.43
Singles	ATP 500	1	11	12	0.08
Singles	ATP 250	8	1	9	0.87
Singles	Olympics	–	–	–	–
Singles	Total	13	18	31	0.40
Doubles	Grand Slam	–	–	–	–
Doubles	ATP Finals	–	–	–	–
Doubles	ATP 1000	–	1	1	0.00
Doubles	ATP 500	1	–	1	1.00
Doubles	ATP 250	1	–	1	1.00
Doubles	Olympics	–	–	–	–
Doubles	Total	2	1	3	0.67
^{1)} WR = Winning Rate

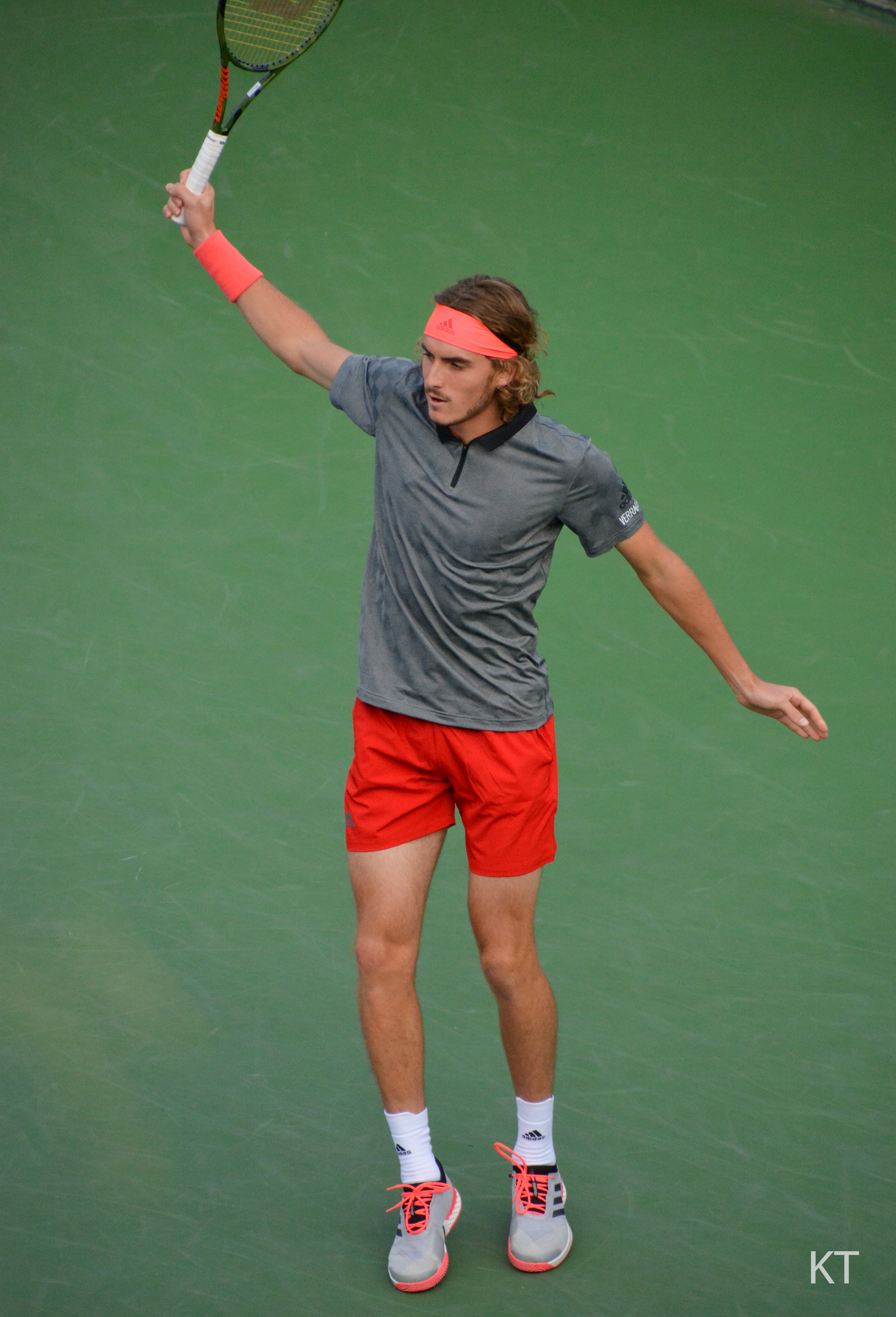
Stefanos Tsitsipas in 2018

This is a list of the main career statistics of Greek professional tennis player Stefanos Tsitsipas. All statistics are according to the ATP Tour and ITF websites.

== Performance timelines ==
Key
W	F	SF	QF	#R	RR	Q#	P#	DNQ	A	Z#	PO	G	S	B	NMS	NTI	P	NH

(W) winner; (F) finalist; (SF) semifinalist; (QF) quarterfinalist; (#R) rounds 4, 3, 2, 1; (RR) round-robin stage; (Q#) qualification round; (P#) preliminary round; (DNQ) did not qualify; (A) absent; (Z#) Davis/Fed Cup Zonal Group (with number indication) or (PO) play-off; (G) gold, (S) silver or (B) bronze Olympic/Paralympic medal; (NMS) not a Masters tournament; (NTI) not a Tier I tournament; (P) postponed; (NH) not held; (SR) strike rate (events won / competed); (W–L) win–loss record.
To avoid confusion and double counting, these charts are updated at the conclusion of a tournament or when the player's participation has ended.

=== Singles ===
Current through the 2026 Winston-Salem Open.

Tournament	2017	2018	2019	2020	2021	2022	2023	2024	2025	2026	SR	W–L	Win %
Grand Slam tournaments
Australian Open	Q2	1R	SF	3R (Note: Tsitsipas received walkovers in the second round of the 2020 Australian Open and the fourth round of the 2021 Australian Open, which do not officially count as wins.)	SF	SF	F	4R	1R	2R	0 / 9	25–9	74%
French Open	1R	2R	4R	SF	F	4R	QF	QF	2R	2R	0 / 10	28–10	74%
Wimbledon	1R	4R	1R	NH	1R	3R	4R	2R	1R	2R	0 / 9	10–9	53%
US Open	Q3	2R	1R	3R	3R	1R	2R	1R	2R		0 / 8	7–8	47%
Win–loss	0–2	5–4	8–4	8–3	12–4	10–4	14–4	8–4	2–4	3–3	0 / 36	70–36	66%
Year-end championships
ATP Finals	DNQ		W	RR	RR	RR	RR	Alt	DNQ		1 / 5	6–8	43%
National representation
Summer Olympics	not held				3R	NH		QF	NH		0 / 2	5–2	71%
Davis Cup	A	A	G3	WG2 P-O		WG2	WG1	WG1	WG1		0 / 0	15–2	88%
ATP 1000 tournaments
Indian Wells Open	A	2R	2R	NH	QF	3R	2R	4R	4R	1R	0 / 8	9–8	53%
Miami Open	A	1R	4R	NH	QF	4R	4R	2R	3R	3R	0 / 8	11–8	58%
Monte-Carlo Masters	A	2R	3R	NH	W	W	QF	W	QF	1R	3 / 8	22–5	81%
Madrid Open	A	1R	F	NH	3R	SF	QF	2R	3R	4R	0 / 8	15–8	65%
Italian Open	A	2R	SF	2R	QF	F	SF	QF	3R	1R	0 / 9	17–9	65%
Canadian Open	A	F	2R	NH	SF	2R	2R	2R	2R	2R	0 / 8	9–8	53%
Cincinnati Open	A	1R	2R	SF	SF	F	3R	2R	3R	2R	0 / 9	14–9	61%
Shanghai Masters	2R	3R	SF	Not Held			3R	4R	A		0 / 5	9–5	64%
Paris Masters	A	2R	QF	2R	2R	SF	SF	QF	A		0 / 7	11–7	61%
Win–loss	1–1	10–9	14–9	3–3	20–7	22–7	15–9	17–8	8–7	7–7	3 / 70	117–67	64%
Career statistics
Tournament	2017	2018	2019	2020	2021	2022	2023	2024	2025	2026	SR	W–L	Win %
Tournaments	10	29	27	12	21	23	23	22	17	20	Career Total: 204		
Titles	0	1	3	1	2	2	1	1	1	1	Career Total: 13		
Finals	0	3	6	3	5	7	3	2	1	1	Career Total: 31		
Hard win–loss	4–7	29–18	37–17	18–11	32–13	36–17	30–15	21–14	14–11	14–11	6 / 129	235–134	64%
Clay win–loss	0–2	11–6	15–5	11–3	23–5	17–4	17–5	22–6	7–5	10–6	6 / 53	133–47	74%
Grass win–loss	0–1	6–3	2–3	0–0	0–1	8–3	4–4	2–2	1–2	1–2	1 / 22	24–21	53%
Overall win–loss	4–10	46–27	54–25	29–14	55–19	61–24	51–24	45–22	22–18	25–19	13 / 204	392–202	66%
Win %	29%	63%	68%	67%	74%	72%	68%	67%	55%	57%	66%		
Year-end ranking	91	15	6	6	4	4	6	11	36		$38,223,279		

=== Doubles ===
Tournament	2018	2019	2020	2021	2022	2023	2024	2025	2026	SR	W–L	Win%
Grand Slam tournaments
Australian Open	A	A	A	1R	A	2R	1R	A	A	0 / 3	1–3	25%
French Open	A	A	A	A	A	1R	QF	1R	A	0 / 3	3–3	50%
Wimbledon	1R	A	NH	1R	A	1R	1R	A	A	0 / 4	0–4	0%
US Open	2R	A	A	A	1R	2R	A	A		0 / 3	2–3	40%
Win–loss	1–2	0–0	0–0	0–2	0–1	2–4	3–3	0–1	0–0	0 / 13	6–13	32%
National Representation
Summer Olympics	not held			A	NH		1R	NH		0 / 1	0–1	0%
ATP 1000 tournaments
Indian Wells Open	A	1R	NH	A	QF	A	A	A	2R	0 / 3	3–3	50%
Miami Open	A	F	NH	A	2R	A	2R	A	A	0 / 3	6–3	67%
Monte-Carlo Masters	A	1R	NH	2R	2R	2R	A	2R	1R	0 / 6	4–6	40%
Madrid Open	A	SF	NH	1R	1R	1R	1R	A	2R	0 / 6	4–6	40%
Italian Open	A	1R	1R	1R	A	A	1R	A	A	0 / 4	0–4	0%
Canadian Open	1R	A	NH	A	A	A	A	A	A	0 / 1	0–1	0%
Cincinnati Open	1R	1R	A	A	SF (Note: Tsitsipas withdrew before the start of the semifinals in the 2022 Cincinnati Open which does not officially count as a loss.)	1R	1R	A	A	0 / 5	3–4	43%
Shanghai Masters	1R	1R	NH			QF	1R	A		0 / 4	2–4	33%
Paris Masters	2R	2R	A	1R	A	A	A	A		0 / 3	1–3	25%
Win–loss	1–4	7–8	0–1	1–4	7–4	3–4	1–5	1–1	2–3	0 / 35	23–34	40%
Career statistics
	2018	2019	2020	2021	2022	2023	2024	2025	2026	SR	W–L	Win %
Tournaments	10	12	3	11	9	12	14	2	5	Career total: 78		
Titles	0	0	0	0	1	1	0	0	0	Career total: 2		
Finals	0	1	0	0	1	1	0	0	0	Career total: 3		
Overall win–loss	3–10	7–14	0–4	5–12	13–8	10–12	6–15	1–3	4–5	2 / 78	49–83	37%
Win %	23%	33%	0%	29%	65%	45%	29%	25%	44%	37%		
Year-end ranking	211	85	100	131	71	113	161	577				

== Grand Slam tournament finals ==
=== Singles: 2 (2 runners-up) ===
Result	Year	Tournament	Surface	Opponent	Score
Loss	2021	French Open	Clay	(Serbia) Novak Djokovic	7–6^{(8–6)}, 6–2, 3–6, 2–6, 4–6
Loss	2023	Australian Open	Hard	(Serbia) Novak Djokovic	3–6, 6–7^{(4–7)}, 6–7^{(5–7)}

== Other significant finals ==
=== Year-end championships (ATP Finals) ===
==== Singles: 1 (title) ====
Result	Year	Tournament	Surface	Opponent	Score
Win	2019	ATP Finals, UK	Hard (i)	(Austria) Dominic Thiem	6–7^{(6–8)}, 6–2, 7–6^{(7–4)}

=== ATP 1000 tournaments ===
==== Singles: 7 (3 titles, 4 runners-up) ====
Result	Year	Tournament	Surface	Opponent	Score
Loss	2018	Canadian Open	Hard	(Spain) Rafael Nadal	2–6, 6–7^{(4–7)}
Loss	2019	Madrid Open	Clay	(Serbia) Novak Djokovic	3–6, 4–6
Win	2021	Monte-Carlo Masters	Clay	(Russia) Andrey Rublev	6–3, 6–3
Win	2022	Monte-Carlo Masters (2)	Clay	(Spain) Alejandro Davidovich Fokina	6–3, 7–6^{(7–3)}
Loss	2022	Italian Open	Clay	(Serbia) Novak Djokovic	0–6, 6–7^{(5–7)}
Loss	2022	Cincinnati Open	Hard	(Croatia) Borna Ćorić	6–7^{(0–7)}, 2–6
Win	2024	Monte-Carlo Masters (3)	Clay	(Norway) Casper Ruud	6–1, 6–4

==== Doubles: 1 (runner-up) ====
Result	Year	Tournament	Surface	Partner	Opponents	Score
Loss	2019	Miami Open	Hard	(Netherlands) Wesley Koolhof	(United States) Bob Bryan (United States) Mike Bryan	5–7, 6–7^{(8–10)}

== ATP Tour finals ==
=== Singles: 31 (13 titles, 18 runners-up) ===
Legend Grand Slam (0–2) ATP Finals (1–0) ATP 1000 (3–4) ATP 500 (1–11) ATP 250 (8–1)	Finals by surface Hard (6–10) Clay (6–8) Grass (1–0)	Finals by setting Outdoor (9–15) Indoor (4–3)

Result	W–L	Date	Tournament	Tier	Surface	Opponent	Score
Loss	0–1	Apr 2018	Barcelona Open, Spain	ATP 500	Clay	(Spain) Rafael Nadal	2–6, 1–6
Loss	0–2	Aug 2018	Canadian Open, Canada	ATP 1000	Hard	(Spain) Rafael Nadal	2–6, 6–7^{(4–7)}
Win	1–2	Oct 2018	Stockholm Open, Sweden	ATP 250	Hard (i)	(Latvia) Ernests Gulbis	6–4, 6–4
Win	2–2	Feb 2019	Open 13, France	ATP 250	Hard (i)	(Kazakhstan) Mikhail Kukushkin	7–5, 7–6^{(7–5)}
Loss	2–3	Mar 2019	Dubai Tennis Championships, UAE	ATP 500	Hard	(Switzerland) Roger Federer	4–6, 4–6
Win	3–3	May 2019	Estoril Open, Portugal	ATP 250	Clay	(Uruguay) Pablo Cuevas	6–3, 7–6^{(7–4)}
Loss	3–4	May 2019	Madrid Open, Spain	ATP 1000	Clay	(Serbia) Novak Djokovic	3–6, 4–6
Loss	3–5	Oct 2019	China Open, China	ATP 500	Hard	(Austria) Dominic Thiem	6–3, 4–6, 1–6
Win	4–5	Nov 2019	ATP Finals, United Kingdom	ATP Finals	Hard (i)	(Austria) Dominic Thiem	6–7^{(6–8)}, 6–2, 7–6^{(7–4)}
Win	5–5	Feb 2020	Open 13, France (2)	ATP 250	Hard (i)	(Canada) Félix Auger-Aliassime	6–3, 6–4
Loss	5–6	Feb 2020	Dubai Tennis Championships, UAE	ATP 500	Hard	(Serbia) Novak Djokovic	3–6, 4–6
Loss	5–7	Sep 2020	Hamburg European Open, Germany	ATP 500	Clay	(Russia) Andrey Rublev	4–6, 6–3, 5–7
Loss	5–8	Mar 2021	Mexican Open, Mexico	ATP 500	Hard	(Germany) Alexander Zverev	4–6, 6–7^{(3–7)}
Win	6–8	Apr 2021	Monte-Carlo Masters, France	ATP 1000	Clay	(Russia) Andrey Rublev	6–3, 6–3
Loss	6–9	Apr 2021	Barcelona Open, Spain	ATP 500	Clay	(Spain) Rafael Nadal	4–6, 7–6^{(8–6)}, 5–7
Win	7–9	May 2021	Lyon Open, France	ATP 250	Clay	(United Kingdom) Cameron Norrie	6–3, 6–3
Loss	7–10	Jun 2021	French Open, Paris, France	Grand Slam	Clay	(Serbia) Novak Djokovic	7–6^{(8–6)}, 6–2, 3–6, 2–6, 4–6
Loss	7–11	Feb 2022	Rotterdam Open, Netherlands	ATP 500	Hard (i)	(Canada) Félix Auger-Aliassime	4–6, 2–6
Win	8–11	Apr 2022	Monte-Carlo Masters, France (2)	ATP 1000	Clay	(Spain) Alejandro Davidovich Fokina	6–3, 7–6^{(7–3)}
Loss	8–12	May 2022	Italian Open, Italy	ATP 1000	Clay	(Serbia) Novak Djokovic	0–6, 6–7^{(5–7)}
Win	9–12	Jun 2022	Mallorca Championships, Spain	ATP 250	Grass	(Spain) Roberto Bautista Agut	6–4, 3–6, 7–6^{(7–2)}
Loss	9–13	Aug 2022	Cincinnati Open, US	ATP 1000	Hard	(Croatia) Borna Ćorić	6–7^{(0–7)}, 2–6
Loss	9–14	Oct 2022	Astana Open, Kazakhstan	ATP 500	Hard (i)	(Serbia) Novak Djokovic	3–6, 4–6
Loss	9–15	Oct 2022	Stockholm Open, Sweden	ATP 250	Hard (i)	(Denmark) Holger Rune	4–6, 4–6
Loss	9–16	Jan 2023	Australian Open, Australia	Grand Slam	Hard	(Serbia) Novak Djokovic	3–6, 6–7^{(4–7)}, 6–7^{(5–7)}
Loss	9–17	Apr 2023	Barcelona Open, Spain	ATP 500	Clay	(Spain) Carlos Alcaraz	3–6, 4–6
Win	10–17	Aug 2023	Los Cabos Open, Mexico	ATP 250	Hard	(Australia) Alex de Minaur	6–3, 6–4
Win	11–17	Apr 2024	Monte-Carlo Masters, France (3)	ATP 1000	Clay	(Norway) Casper Ruud	6–1, 6–4
Loss	11–18	Apr 2024	Barcelona Open, Spain	ATP 500	Clay	(Norway) Casper Ruud	5–7, 3–6
Win	12–18	Feb 2025	Dubai Tennis Championships, UAE	ATP 500	Hard	(Canada) Félix Auger-Aliassime	6–3, 6–3
Win	13–18	Jul 2026	Swiss Open, Switzerland	ATP 250	Clay	(Belgium) Raphaël Collignon	6–4, 6–7^{(3–7)}, 6–3

=== Doubles: 3 (2 titles, 1 runner-up) ===
Legend Grand Slam (0–0) ATP Finals (0–0) ATP 1000 (0–1) ATP 500 (1–0) ATP 250 (1–0)	Finals by surface Hard (2–1) Clay (0–0) Grass (0–0)	Finals by setting Outdoor (1–1) Indoor (1–0)

Result	W–L	Date	Tournament	Tier	Surface	Partner	Opponents	Score
Loss	0–1	Mar 2019	Miami Open, United States	ATP 1000	Hard	(Netherlands) Wesley Koolhof	(United States) Bob Bryan (United States) Mike Bryan	5–7, 6–7^{(8–10)}
Win	1–1	Feb 2022	Mexican Open, Mexico	ATP 500	Hard	(Spain) Feliciano López	(El Salvador) Marcelo Arévalo (Netherlands) Jean-Julien Rojer	7–5, 6–4
Win	2–1	Oct 2023	European Open, Belgium	ATP 250	Hard (i)	(Greece) Petros Tsitsipas	(Uruguay) Ariel Behar (Czech Republic) Adam Pavlásek	6–7^{(5–7)}, 6–4, [10–8]

== ATP Next Generation finals ==
=== Singles: 1 (title) ===
Result	Date	Tournament	Surface	Opponent	Score
Win	2018	Next Generation ATP Finals, Italy	Hard (i)	(Australia) Alex de Minaur	2–4, 4–1, 4–3^{(7–3)}, 4–3^{(7–3)}

== ATP Challenger and ITF Futures finals ==
=== Singles: 11 (6 titles, 5 runners-up) ===
Legend ATP Challenger (1–3) ITF Futures (5–2)	Finals by surface Hard (2–2) Clay (4–3) Grass (0–0)

Result	W–L	Date	Tournament	Tier	Surface	Opponent	Score
Loss	0–1	Oct 2016	Mohammedia Challenger, Morocco	Challenger	Clay	(Austria) Gerald Melzer	6–3, 3–6, 2–6
Loss	0–2	Oct 2016	Casablanca II Challenger, Morocco	Challenger	Clay	(France) Maxime Janvier	4–6, 0–6
Win	1–2	Sep 2017	AON Open Challenger, Italy	Challenger	Clay	(Spain) Guillermo García López	7–5, 7–6^{(7–2)}
Loss	1–3	Oct 2017	Brest Challenger, France	Challenger	Hard	(France) Corentin Moutet	2–6, 6–7^{(8–10)}
Loss	0–1	Nov 2015	F9 Heraklion, Greece	Futures	Hard	(Canada) Steven Diez	2–6, 0–6
Win	1–1	Nov 2015	F1 Nicosia, Cyprus	Futures	Hard	(Belgium) Alexandre Folie	2–6, 6–4, 6–2
Win	2–1	Apr 2016	F6 Pula, Italy	Futures	Clay	(Italy) Erik Crepaldi	6–3, 6–1
Win	3–1	May 2016	F10 Pula, Italy	Futures	Clay	(Norway) Casper Ruud	6–3, 6–7^{(2–7)}, 7–6^{(7–2)}
Win	4–1	May 2016	F12 Lecco, Italy	Futures	Clay	(Italy) Marco Bortolotti	7–6^{(10–8)}, 7–6^{(7–3)}
Loss	4–2	Jul 2016	F2 Kramsach, Austria	Futures	Clay	(Germany) Yannick Hanfmann	4–6, 4–6
Win	5–2	Oct 2016	F11 Oliveira de Azemeis, Portugal	Futures	Hard	(Belgium) Yannick Mertens	6–3, 4–6, 6–2

=== Doubles: 9 (6 titles, 3 runners-up) ===
Legend ATP Challengers (0–1) ITF Futures (6–2)	Finals by surface Hard (6–1) Clay (0–2) Grass (0–0)

Result	W–L	Date	Tournament	Tier	Surface	Partner	Opponents	Score
Loss	0–1	Jul 2017	The Hague Open, Netherlands	Challenger	Clay	(Slovakia) Jozef Kovalík	(Belgium) Sander Gillé (Belgium) Joran Vliegen	2–6, 6–4, [10–12]
Win	1–0	May 2015	F6 Heraklion, Greece	Futures	Hard	(Greece) Alexandros Jakupovic	(Serbia) Danilo Petrović (Serbia) Ilija Vučić	6–3, 3–6, [10–7]
Win	2–0	Nov 2015	F10 Heraklion, Greece	Futures	Hard	(Greece) Konstantinos Economidis	(Bulgaria) Alexandar Lazov (Czech Republic) Dominik Süč	6–2, 6–2
Win	3–0	Nov 2015	F11 Heraklion, Greece	Futures	Hard	(Greece) Konstantinos Economidis	(United States) Alexander Centenari (Germany) Sami Reinwein	w/o
Win	4–0	Apr 2016	F2 Heraklion, Greece	Futures	Hard	(Greece) Konstantinos Economidis	(Czech Republic) Petr Michnev (Czech Republic) Václav Šafránek	4–6, 7–6^{(8–6)}, [10–5]
Win	5–0	Apr 2016	F6 Heraklion, Greece	Futures	Hard	(Greece) Konstantinos Economidis	(United States) Srinayan Nuvvala (Brazil) Bruno Savi	7–6^{(7–5)}, 6–7^{(6–8)}, [13–11]
Loss	5–1	May 2016	F10 Pula, Italy	Futures	Clay	(Greece) Petros Tsitsipas	(Argentina) Franco Agamenone (Argentina) Mateo Nicolás Martínez	2–6, 2–6
Win	6–1	Sep 2016	F6 Calgary, Canada	Futures	Hard	(Netherlands) Tim van Rijthoven	(Mexico) Hans Hach Verdugo (New Zealand) José Statham	6–4, 2–6, [13–11]
Loss	6–2	Oct 2016	F11 Oliveira de Azemeis, Portugal	Futures	Hard	(Italy) Lorenzo Frigerio	(Portugal) Nuno Deus (Portugal) João Domingues	6–7^{(7–9)}, 1–6

Source: ITF player profile

== ITF Junior Circuit ==
=== Singles: 4 (2 titles, 2 runners-up) ===
Legend
Junior Grand Slam events (0–0)
Youth Olympics (0–0)
Junior Masters (0–0)
Grade A (1–2)
Grade B1 (1–0)

Result	W–L	Date	Tournament	Tier	Surface	Opponent	Score
Loss	0–1	Dec 2014	Orange Bowl, United States	Grade A	Hard	(United States) Stefan Kozlov	6–2, 3–6, 2–6
Loss	0–2	Dec 2015	Orange Bowl, United States	Grade A	Hard	(Serbia) Miomir Kecmanović	3–6, 6–2, 6–7^{(5–7)}
Win	1–2	May 2016	Trofeo Bonfiglio, Italy	Grade A	Clay	(United States) Ulises Blanch	6–4, 6–3
Win	2–2	Jul 2016	European Junior Championships, Switzerland	Grade B1	Clay	(France) Corentin Moutet	7–5, 5–3 (ret)

=== Junior Grand Slam finals ===
==== Doubles: 1 (1 title) ====
Result	Year	Tournament	Surface	Partner	Opponent	Score
Win	2016	Wimbledon	Grass	(Estonia) Kenneth Raisma	(Canada) Félix Auger-Aliassime (Canada) Denis Shapovalov	4–6, 6–4, 6–2

=== Junior National representation ===
Result	Year	Tournament	Surface
Bronze	Jul 2013	European Youth Olympic Festival, Netherlands	Clay

== National and international representation ==
=== Team competitions finals: 4 (3 titles, 1 runner-up) ===
Finals by tournaments Laver Cup (3–1) Olympic Games (0–0) Davis Cup (0–0) ATP Cup (0–0) Hopman Cup (0–0)	Finals by tournament category National (0–0) International (3–1)	Finals by continent category Intercontinental (3–1) Continental (0–0)	Finals by teams Greece (0–0) Europe (3–1)	Finals by surface Hard (3–1) Grass (0–0) Clay (0–0)	Finals by setting Outdoors (0–0) Indoors (3–1)

Result	Date	Tournament	Surface	Team	Partner(s) (if)	Opponent team	Opponent player(s)	Score
Win	Sep 2019	Laver Cup, Geneva, Switzerland	Hard (i)	Team Europe	Roger Federer; Rafael Nadal; Dominic Thiem; Alexander Zverev; Fabio Fognini	Team World	John Isner; Milos Raonic; Nick Kyrgios; Taylor Fritz; Denis Shapovalov; Jack Sock	13–11
Win	Sep 2021	Laver Cup, Boston, United States	Hard (i)	Team Europe	Daniil Medvedev; Alexander Zverev; Andrey Rublev; Matteo Berrettini; Casper Ruud	Team World	Félix Auger-Aliassime; Denis Shapovalov; Diego Schwartzman; Reilly Opelka; John Isner; Nick Kyrgios	14–1
Loss	Sep 2022	Laver Cup, London, Great Britain	Hard (i)	Team Europe	Casper Ruud; Rafael Nadal; Novak Djokovic; Roger Federer; Andy Murray; Matteo Berrettini; Cameron Norrie	Team World	Taylor Fritz; Félix Auger-Aliassime; Diego Schwartzman; Frances Tiafoe; Alex de Minaur; Jack Sock	8–13
Win	Sep 2024	Laver Cup, Berlin, Germany	Hard (i)	Team Europe	Carlos Alcaraz; Alexander Zverev; Daniil Medvedev; Casper Ruud; Grigor Dimitrov	Team World	Taylor Fritz; Frances Tiafoe; Ben Shelton; Alejandro Tabilo; Francisco Cerúndolo; Thanasi Kokkinakis	13–11

=== Laver Cup: 4 (3 titles, 1 runner-up) ===
Matches by type Singles (4–1) Doubles (1–3)	Matches by points scoring Day 1, 1 point (3–0) Day 2, 2 points (2–2) Day 3, 3 points (0–2)	Matches by venue Europe (3–4) Rest of the World (2–0)

- ▲ ▼ indicates the result of the Laver Cup match followed by the score, date, place of event and the court surface.

Result	No.	Day (points)	Match type (partner if any)	Opponent team	Opponent player(s)	Score
▲13–11; 20–22 September 2019; Palexpo, Geneva, Switzerland, Hard(i) surface
Win	1	Day 1 (1 point)	Singles	Team World	(United States) Taylor Fritz	6–2, 1–6, [10–7]
Loss	2	Day 2 (2 points)	Doubles (with (Spain) Rafael Nadal)	Team World	(Australia) Nick Kyrgios / (United States) Jack Sock	4–6, 6–3, [6–10]
Loss	3	Day 3 (3 points)	Doubles (with (Switzerland) Roger Federer)	Team World	(United States) John Isner / (United States) Jack Sock	7–5, 4–6, [8–10]
▲14–1; 24–26 September 2021; TD Garden, Boston, United States, Hard(i) surface
Win	4	Day 2 (2 points)	Singles	Team World	(Australia) Nick Kyrgios	6–3, 6–4
Win	5	Day 2 (2 points)	Doubles (with (Russia) Andrey Rublev)	Team World	(United States) John Isner / (Australia) Nick Kyrgios	6–7^{(8–10)}, 6–3, [10–4]
▼8–13; 23–25 September 2022; The O2 Arena, London, Great Britain, Hard(i) surface
Win	6	Day 1 (1 point)	Singles	Team World	(Argentina) Diego Schwartzman	6–2, 6–1
Loss	7	Day 3 (3 points)	Singles	Team World	(United States) Frances Tiafoe	6–1, 6–7^{(11–13)}, [8–10]
▲13–11; 20–22 September 2024; Uber Arena, Berlin, Germany, Hard(i) surface
Win	8	Day 1 (1 point)	Singles	Team World	(Australia) Thanasi Kokkinakis	6–1, 6–4
Loss	9	Day 2 (2 points)	Doubles (with (Norway) Casper Ruud)	Team World	(United States) Ben Shelton / (Chile) Alejandro Tabilo	1–6, 2–6

==== Wins: 3 ====
Edition	Team Europe	Rounds/Opponents
2019 Laver Cup	(Switzerland) Roger Federer (Spain) Rafael Nadal (Austria) Dominic Thiem (Germany) Alexander Zverev (Greece) Stefanos Tsitsipas (Italy) Fabio Fognini	F: EUR 13–11 WOR
2021 Laver Cup	(Russia) Daniil Medvedev (Greece) Stefanos Tsitsipas (Germany) Alexander Zverev (Russia) Andrey Rublev (Italy) Matteo Berrettini (Norway) Casper Ruud	F: EUR 14–1 WOR
2024 Laver Cup	(Germany) Alexander Zverev (Spain) Carlos Alcaraz; Daniil Medvedev (Norway) Casper Ruud (Bulgaria) Grigor Dimitrov (Greece) Stefanos Tsitsipas	F: EUR 13–11 WOR

=== Davis Cup ===
Group membership Finals (0–0) Qualifiers (0–0) World Group I (2–3) World Group I Play-offs (7–0) World Group II (2–0) World Group II Play-offs (2–0) Group III (4–1) Group IV (0)	Matches by Surface Hard (11–3) Clay (6–1) Grass (0–0)	Matches by Type Singles (15–2) Doubles (2–2)	Matches by Setting Indoors (9–0) Outdoors (8–4)	Legend Ties (8–3) Rubbers (17–4)

Group	Rd	Date	Venue	Surface	Opponent nation	Score	Match	Opponent player(s)	W/L	Rubber score
2019
G III	RR	Sep 2019	Athens	Clay	Luxembourg	▲3–0	Singles 2	Tom Diederich	Win	6–1, 6–0
G III	RR	Sep 2019	Athens	Clay	Poland	▼1–2	Singles 2	Hubert Hurkacz	Win	6–3, 6–1
G III	RR	Sep 2019	Athens	Clay	Poland	▼1–2	Doubles (w/ Michail Pervolarakis)	Łukasz Kubot / Marcin Matkowski	Loss	6–3, 4–6, 1–6
G III	RR	Sep 2019	Athens	Clay	Monaco	▲2–1	Singles 2	Lucas Catarina	Win	6–2, 6–1
G III	RR	Sep 2019	Athens	Clay	Latvia	▲2–1	Singles 2	Mārtiņš Podžus	Win	6–4, 6–4
2020
WG II P-O	QR	Mar 2020	Manila	Clay (i)	Philippines	▲4–1	Singles 1	Alberto Lim Jr.	Win	6–2, 6–1
WG II P-O	QR	Mar 2020	Manila	Clay (i)	Philippines	▲4–1	Singles 3	Jeson Patrombon	Win	6–2, 6–1
2022
WG II	QR	Sep 2022	Tunis	Hard	Tunisia	▲3–1	Singles 1	Aziz Dougaz	Win	7–6^{(7–3)}, 6–2
WG II	QR	Sep 2022	Tunis	Hard	Tunisia	▲3–1	Singles 3	Skander Mansouri	Win	6–2, 6–4
2023
WG I P-O	QR	Feb 2023	Athens	Hard (i)	Ecuador	▲3–1	Singles 1	Álvaro Guillén Meza	Win	7–5, 6–2
WG I P-O	QR	Feb 2023	Athens	Hard (i)	Ecuador	▲3–1	Singles 3	Andrés Andrade	Win	7–6^{(7–1)}, 6–1
WG I	QR	Sep 2023	Athens	Hard	Slovakia	▼1–3	Singles 2	Lukáš Klein	Win	6–7^{(3–7)}, 7–6^{(7–5)}, 4–0 ret.
WG I	QR	Sep 2023	Athens	Hard	Slovakia	▼1–3	Doubles (w/ Petros Tsitsipas)	Lukáš Klein / Igor Zelenay	Loss	3–6, 7–6^{(7–5)}, 3–6
WG I	QR	Sep 2023	Athens	Hard	Slovakia	▼1–3	Singles 3	Alex Molčan	Loss	6–7^{(6–8)}, 6–4, 3–6
2024
WG I P-O	QR	Feb 2024	Athens	Hard (i)	Romania	▲4–0	Singles 1	Marius Copil	Win	6–3, 6–4
WG I P-O	QR	Feb 2024	Athens	Hard (i)	Romania	▲4–0	Doubles (w/ Petros Tsitsipas)	Marius Copil / Victor Vlad Cornea	Win	6–7^{(4–7)}, 6–3, 6–4
2025
WG I	QR	Sep 2025	Athens	Hard	Brazil	▼1–3	Singles 2	Thiago Seyboth Wild	Win	6–2, 6–1
WG I	QR	Sep 2025	Athens	Hard	Brazil	▼1–3	Singles 3	João Fonseca	Loss	4–6, 6–3, 5–7
2026
WG I P-O	QR	Feb 2026	Athens	Hard (i)	Mexico	▲3–1	Singles 2	Alan Magadán	Win	6–3, 7–6^{(7–1)}
WG I P-O	QR	Feb 2026	Athens	Hard (i)	Mexico	▲3–1	Doubles (w/ Stefanos Sakellaridis)	Alan Magadán / Rodrigo Pacheco Méndez	Win	6–3, 6–4
WG I P-O	QR	Feb 2026	Athens	Hard (i)	Mexico	▲3–1	Singles 3	Rodrigo Pacheco Méndez	Win	6–1, 7–5

=== ATP Cup ===
Group membership Knockout stage (0–0) Group stage (6–6)	Legend Ties (2–6) Rubbers (6–6)	Matches by Type Singles (4–3) Doubles (2–3)	Matches by Surface & Setting Hard Outdoors (6–6) Hard Indoors (0–0)	Matches by City Brisbane (1–3) Melbourne (3–1) Sydney (2–2) Perth (0–0)

Group	Rd	Date	Venue	Surface	Opponent nation	Score	Match	Opponent player(s)	W/L	Rubber score
2020
GS	RR	Jan 2020	Brisbane	Hard	Canada	▼0–3	Singles 2	Denis Shapovalov	Loss	6–7^{(6–8)}, 6–7^{(4–7)}
GS	RR	Jan 2020	Brisbane	Hard	Germany	▼1–2	Singles 2	Alexander Zverev	Win	6–1, 6–4
GS	RR	Jan 2020	Brisbane	Hard	Germany	▼1–2	Doubles (w/ Michail Pervolarakis)	Kevin Krawietz / Andreas Mies	Loss	6–3, 3–6, [15–17]
GS	RR	Jan 2020	Brisbane	Hard	Australia	▼0–3	Singles 2	Nick Kyrgios	Loss	6–7^{(7–9)}, 7–6^{(7–3)}, 6–7^{(5–7)}
2021
GS	RR	Feb 2021	Melbourne	Hard						
GS	RR	Feb 2021	Melbourne	Hard	Australia	▼1–2	Singles 2	Alex de Minaur	Win	6–3, 7–5
GS	RR	Feb 2021	Melbourne	Hard	Australia	▼1–2	Doubles (w/ Michail Pervolarakis)	John Peers / Luke Saville	Loss	3–6, 6–4, [5–10]
GS	RR	Feb 2021	Melbourne	Hard	Spain	▲2–1	Singles 2	Roberto Bautista Agut	Win	7–5, 7–5
GS	RR	Feb 2021	Melbourne	Hard	Spain	▲2–1	Doubles (w/ Markos Kalovelonis)	Pablo Carreño Busta / Marcel Granollers	Win	0–1 Ret.
2022
GS	RR	Jan 2022	Sydney	Hard						
GS	RR	Jan 2022	Sydney	Hard	Poland	▼1–2	Doubles (w/ Michail Pervolarakis)	Hubert Hurkacz / Jan Zieliński	Win	6–4, 5–7, [10–8]
GS	RR	Jan 2022	Sydney	Hard	Argentina	▼0–3	Singles 2	Diego Schwartzman	Loss	7–6^{(7–5)}, 3–6, 3–6
GS	RR	Jan 2022	Sydney	Hard	(Georgia (country)) Georgia	▲2–1	Singles 2	Nikoloz Basilashvili	Win	4–1 Ret.
GS	RR	Jan 2022	Sydney	Hard	(Georgia (country)) Georgia	▲2–1	Doubles (w/ Michail Pervolarakis)	Aleksandre Bakshi / Aleksandre Metreveli	Loss	6–4, 3–6, [14–16]

=== United Cup ===
Group membership Knockout stage (9–2) Group stage (5–2)	Legend Ties (7–5) Rubbers (14–4)	Matches by Type Singles (9–2) Mixed doubles (5–2)	Matches by Surface & Setting Hard Outdoors (14–4) Hard Indoors (0–0)	Matches by City Brisbane (0–0) Melbourne (0–0) Sydney (2–2) Perth (12–2)

Group	Rd	Date	Venue	Surface	Opponent nation	Score	Match	Opponent player(s)	W/L	Rubber score
2023
GS	RR	Jan 2023	Perth	Hard	Bulgaria	▲4–1	Singles	Grigor Dimitrov	Win	4–6, 6–2, 7–6^{(7–4)}
GS	RR	Jan 2023	Perth	Hard	Bulgaria	▲4–1	Mixed doubles (w/ Maria Sakkari)	Gergana Topalova / Adrian Andreev	Win	6–4, 6–4
GS	RR	Jan 2023	Perth	Hard	Belgium	▲4–1	Singles	David Goffin	Win	6–3, 6–2
GS	RR	Jan 2023	Perth	Hard	Belgium	▲4–1	Mixed doubles (w/ Maria Sakkari)	Kirsten Flipkens / Michael Geerts	Win	6–3, 6–2
KS	QF	Jan 2023	Perth	Hard	Croatia	▲3–2	Singles	Borna Ćorić	Win	6–0, 6–7^{(4–7)}, 7–5
KS	QF	Jan 2023	Perth	Hard	Croatia	▲3–2	Mixed doubles (w/ Maria Sakkari)	Petra Martić / Borna Gojo	Win	7–6^{(8–6)}, 6–4
KS	SF	Jan 2023	Sydney	Hard	Italy	▼1–4	Singles	Matteo Berrettini	Win	4–6, 7–6^{(7–4)}, 6–4
2024		Jan 2023		Hard						
GS	RR	Jan 2024	Sydney	Hard	Chile	▼1–2	Mixed doubles (w/ Maria Sakkari)	Daniela Seguel / Tomás Barrios Vera	Loss	7–6^{(7–5)}, 3–6, [6–10]
GS	RR	Jan 2024	Sydney	Hard	Canada	▲3–0	Singles	Steven Diez	Win	6–2, 6–3
KS	QF	Jan 2024	Sydney	Hard	Germany	▼1–2	Singles	Alexander Zverev	Loss	4–6, 4–6
2025
GS	RR	Jan 2025	Perth	Hard	Spain	▲2–1	Singles	Pablo Carreño Busta	Win	6–4, 4–6, 6–3
GS	RR	Jan 2025	Perth	Hard	Spain	▲2–1	Mixed doubles (w/ Maria Sakkari)	Yvonne Cavallé Reimers / Sergio Martos Gornés	Win	4–6, 6–3, [10–6]
GS	RR	Jan 2025	Perth	Hard	Kazakhstan	▼0–3	Singles	Alexander Shevchenko	Loss	4–6, 6–7^{(0–7)}
2026
GS	RR	Jan 2026	Perth	Hard	Japan	▲3–0	Singles	Shintaro Mochizuki	Win	6–3, 6–4
GS	RR	Jan 2026	Perth	Hard	Japan	▲3–0	Mixed doubles (w/ Maria Sakkari)	Nao Hibino / Yasutaka Uchiyama	Win	6–2, 6–3
GS	RR	Jan 2026	Perth	Hard	Great Britain	▲2–1	Singles	Billy Harris	Win	4–6, 6–1, 7–6^{(7–4)}
KS	QF	Jan 2026	Perth	Hard	United States	▼1–2	Singles	Taylor Fritz	Win	6–4, 7–5
KS	QF	Jan 2026	Perth	Hard	United States	▼1–2	Mixed doubles (w/ Maria Sakkari)	Coco Gauff / Christian Harrison	Loss	6–4, 4–6, [8-10]

=== Hopman Cup ===
Legend Ties (2–3) Rubbers (4–6)	Matches by Type Singles (1–4) Mixed doubles (3–2)	Matches by Surface & Setting Hard Outdoors (1–3) Hard Indoors (3–3)	Matches by City Perth, Australia (3–3) Bari, Italy (1–3)

- ▲ ▼ indicates the result of the Hopman Cup match followed by the score, date, place of event, competition phase, and the court surface.

Result	No.	Match type (partner if any)	Opponent nation	Opponent player(s)	Score
▼1–2; 29 December 2018; Perth Arena, Perth, Australia; Round robin; Hard(i) surface - 2019 Hopman Cup
Loss	1	Singles	Great Britain	Cameron Norrie	6–7^{(8–10)}, 4–6
Loss	2	Mixed doubles (with Maria Sakkari) (decider)	Great Britain	Katie Boulter/ Cameron Norrie	3–4^{(0–5)}, 4–3^{(5–2)}, 3–4^{(4–5)}
▲2–1; 31 December 2018; Perth Arena, Perth, Australia; Round robin; Hard(i) surface - 2019 Hopman Cup
Win	3	Singles	United States	Frances Tiafoe	6–3, 6–7^{(3–7)}, 6–3
Win	4	Mixed doubles (with Maria Sakkari) (decider)	United States	Serena Williams/ Frances Tiafoe	4–1, 1–4, 4–2
▲2–1; 3 January 2019; Perth Arena, Perth, Australia; Round robin; Hard(i) surface - 2019 Hopman Cup
Loss	5	Singles	Switzerland	Roger Federer	6–7^{(5–7)}, 6–7^{(4–7)}
Win	6	Mixed doubles (with Maria Sakkari) (decider)	Switzerland	Belinda Bencic/ Roger Federer	4–3^{(5–4)}, 2–4, 4–3^{(5–3)}
▼1–2; 17 July 2025; Fiera del Levante, Bari, Italy; Round robin; Hard surface - 2025 Hopman Cup
Loss	1	Singles	Spain	Roberto Bautista Agut	3–6, 7–6^{(8–6)}, [8–10]
Win	2	Mixed doubles (with Despina Papamichail)	Spain	Marina Bassols Ribera/ Roberto Bautista Agut	6–2, 6–3
▼0–3; 19 July 2025; Fiera del Levante, Bari, Italy; Round robin; Hard surface - 2025 Hopman Cup
Loss	3	Singles	Canada	Félix Auger-Aliassime	6–7^{(4–7)}, 3–6
Loss	4	Mixed doubles (with Despina Papamichail)	Canada	Bianca Andreescu/ Félix Auger-Aliassime	4–6, ret.

== Tennis leagues ==
=== League finals: 1 (1 runner-up) ===
Finals by leagues Ultimate Tennis Showdown (UTS) (0–1)	League table results 1st place (1) 2nd place (0) 3rd place (0) 4th place (0)

Place	Date	League	Location	Surface	League Nickname	League Opponent players
Runner-up (1st)	Jun–Jul 2020	Ultimate Tennis Showdown (UTS)	France	Hard	(Greece) The Greek God	(Italy) The Hammer: Champion (3rd) (France) The Virtuoso: Semifinals (2nd) (Belgium) The Wall: Semifinals (4th) (Spain) El Torero: 5th (France) The Underdog: 6th (France) The Tornado: 7th (Australia) The Sniper: 8th (Germany) The Artist: 9th (France) The Rebel: 10th (Austria) Domi: 11th (France) The French Flair: 12th

== Coaches ==
Career coaches:
(Greece) Apostolos Tsitsipas (2004–2024; 2025–present)
(Greece) Giorgos Spiliopoulos (2004–2006)
(Greece) Giorgos Fountoukos (Current mentor) (2006–present)
(Greece) / (France) Patrick Mouratoglou (2015–present)
(Australia) Mark Philippoussis (2022–2023)
(Greece) Dimitris Chatzinikolaou (2024–2025)
(Croatia) Goran Ivanišević (2025)
(France) Frédéric Lefebvre (Fitness Coach) (2017–present)

National team coaches/captains:
(Greece) Dimitris Chatzinikolaou (Davis Cup) (2019–present)
(Greece) Apostolos Tsitsipas (Davis Cup & ATP Cup) (2019–present)

International Team coaches/ captains:
(Sweden) Björn Borg (Captain) (Laver Cup) (2019, 2021, 2022, 2024)
(Sweden) Thomas Enqvist (Vice-captain) (Laver Cup) (2019, 2021, 2022, 2024)

== Best Grand Slam results details ==
	Australian Open	
2023 Australian Open (3rd Seed)
Round	Opponent	Score
1R	(France) Quentin Halys	6–3, 6–4, 7–6^{(8–6)}
2R	(Australia) Rinky Hijikata	6–3, 6–0, 6–2
3R	(Netherlands) Tallon Griekspoor	6–2, 7–6^{(7–5)}, 6–3
4R	(Italy) Jannik Sinner (15)	6–4, 6–4, 3–6, 4–6, 6–3
QF	(Czech Republic) Jiří Lehečka	6–3, 7–6^{(7–2)}, 6–4
SF	(Russia) Karen Khachanov (18)	7–6^{(7–2)}, 6–4, 6–7^{(6–8)}, 6–3
F	(Serbia) Novak Djokovic (4)	3–6, 6–7^{(4–7)}, 6–7^{(5–7)}

	French Open	
2021 French Open (5th Seed)
Round	Opponent	Score
1R	(France) Jérémy Chardy	7–6^{(8–6)}, 6–3, 6–1
2R	(Spain) Pedro Martínez	6–3, 6–4, 6–3
3R	(United States) John Isner (31)	5–7, 6–3, 7–6^{(7–3)}, 6–1
4R	(Spain) Pablo Carreño Busta (12)	6–3, 6–2, 7–5
QF	(Russia) Daniil Medvedev (2)	6–3, 7–6^{(7–3)}, 7–5
SF	(Germany) Alexander Zverev (6)	6–3, 6–3, 4–6, 4–6, 6–3
F	(Serbia) Novak Djokovic (1)	7–6^{(8–6)}, 6–2, 3–6, 2–6, 4–6

	Wimbledon Championships	
2018 Wimbledon (31st seed)
Round	Opponent	Score
1R	(France) Grégoire Barrère (Q)	6–3, 6–4, 6–7^{(3–7)}, 7–5
2R	(United States) Jared Donaldson	6–3, 6–2, 3–6, 4–6, 6–3
3R	(Italy) Thomas Fabbiano (Q)	6–2, 6–1, 6–4
4R	(United States) John Isner (9)	4–6, 6–7^{(8–10)}, 6–7^{(4–7)}

	Wimbledon Championships	
2023 Wimbledon (5th seed)
Round	Opponent	Score
1R	(Austria) Dominic Thiem	3–6, 7–6^{(7–1)}, 6–2, 6–7^{(5–7)}, 7–6^{(10–8)}
2R	(United Kingdom) Andy Murray	7–6^{(7–3)}, 6–7^{(2–7)}, 4–6, 7–6^{(7–3)}, 6–4
3R	(Serbia) Laslo Djere	6–4, 7–6^{(7–5)}, 6–4
4R	(United States) Christopher Eubanks	6–3, 6–7^{(4–7)}, 6–3, 4–6, 4–6

	US Open	
2020 US Open (4th Seed)
Round	Opponent	Score
1R	(Spain) Albert Ramos Viñolas	6–2, 6–1, 6–1
2R	(United States) Maxime Cressy (WC)	7–6^{(7–2)}, 6–3, 6–4
3R	(Croatia) Borna Ćorić (27)	7–6^{(7–2)}, 4–6, 6–4, 5–7, 6–7^{(4–7)}

	US Open	
2021 US Open (3rd Seed)
Round	Opponent	Score
1R	(United Kingdom) Andy Murray	2–6, 7–6^{(9–7)}, 3–6, 6–3, 6–4
2R	(France) Adrian Mannarino	6–3, 6–4, 6–7^{(4–7)}, 6–0
3R	(Spain) Carlos Alcaraz	3–6, 6–4, 6–7^{(2–7)}, 6–0, 6–7^{(5–7)}

== Wins over top 10 players ==
- Tsitsipas has a 37–55 record against players who were ranked in the top 10 at the time the match was played.

Year	2016	2017	2018	2019	2020	2021	2022	2023	2024	2025	2026	Total
Wins	0	1	6	9	2	5	8	1	3	0	2	37

#	Player	Rk	Event	Surface	Rd	Score	Rk	Ref
2017
1.	(Belgium) David Goffin	10	European Open, Belgium	Hard (i)	QF	2–6, 7–6^{(7–1)}, 7–6^{(7–4)}	122	
2018
2.	(Austria) Dominic Thiem	7	Barcelona Open, Spain	Clay	QF	6–3, 6–2	63	
3.	(South Africa) Kevin Anderson	8	Estoril Open, Portugal	Clay	2R	6–7^{(3–7)}, 6–3, 6–3	44	
4.	(Austria) Dominic Thiem	8	Canadian Open, Canada	Hard	2R	6–3, 7–6^{(8–6)}	27	
5.	(Serbia) Novak Djokovic	10	Canadian Open, Canada	Hard	3R	6–3, 6–7^{(5–7)}, 6–3	27	
6.	(Germany) Alexander Zverev	3	Canadian Open, Canada	Hard	QF	3–6, 7–6^{(13–11)}, 6–4	27	
7.	(South Africa) Kevin Anderson	6	Canadian Open, Canada	Hard	SF	6–7^{(4–7)}, 6–4, 7–6^{(9–7)}	27	
2019
8.	(Switzerland) Roger Federer	3	Australian Open, Australia	Hard	4R	6–7^{(11–13)}, 7–6^{(7–3)}, 7–5, 7–6^{(7–5)}	15	
9.	(Germany) Alexander Zverev	4	Madrid Open, Spain	Clay	QF	7–5, 3–6, 6–2	9	
10.	(Spain) Rafael Nadal	2	Madrid Open, Spain	Clay	SF	6–4, 2–6, 6–3	9	
11.	(Germany) Alexander Zverev	6	China Open, China	Hard	SF	7–6^{(8–6)}, 6–4	7	
12.	(Serbia) Novak Djokovic	1	Shanghai Masters, China	Hard	QF	3–6, 7–5, 6–3	7	
13.	(Russia) Daniil Medvedev	4	ATP Finals, United Kingdom	Hard (i)	RR	7–6^{(7–5)}, 6–4	6	
14.	(Germany) Alexander Zverev	7	ATP Finals, United Kingdom	Hard (i)	RR	6–3, 6–2	6	
15.	(Switzerland) Roger Federer	3	ATP Finals, United Kingdom	Hard (i)	SF	6–3, 6–4	6	
16.	(Austria) Dominic Thiem	5	ATP Finals, United Kingdom	Hard (i)	F	6–7^{(6–8)}, 6–2, 7–6^{(7–4)}	6	
2020
17.	(Germany) Alexander Zverev	7	ATP Cup, Australia	Hard	RR	6–1, 6–4	6	
18.	(Russia) Andrey Rublev	8	ATP Finals, United Kingdom	Hard (i)	RR	6–1, 4–6, 7–6^{(8–6)}	6	
2021
19.	(Spain) Rafael Nadal	2	Australian Open, Australia	Hard	QF	3–6, 2–6, 7–6^{(7–4)}, 6–4, 7–5	6	
20.	(Russia) Andrey Rublev	8	Monte-Carlo Masters, France	Clay	F	6–3, 6–3	5	
21.	(Italy) Matteo Berrettini	9	Italian Open, Italy	Clay	3R	7–6^{(7–3)}, 6–2	5	
22.	(Russia) Daniil Medvedev	2	French Open, France	Clay	QF	6–3, 7–6^{(7–3)}, 7–5	5	
23.	(Germany) Alexander Zverev	6	French Open, France	Clay	SF	6–3, 6–3, 4–6, 4–6, 6–3	5	
2022
24.	(Italy) Jannik Sinner	10	Australian Open, Australia	Hard	QF	6–3, 6–4, 6–2	4	
25.	(Germany) Alexander Zverev	3	Monte-Carlo Masters, France	Clay	SF	6–4, 6–2	5	
26.	Andrey Rublev	8	Madrid Open, Spain	Clay	QF	6–3, 2–6, 6–4	5	
27.	(Germany) Alexander Zverev	3	Italian Open, Italy	Clay	SF	4–6, 6–3, 6–3	5	
28.	Daniil Medvedev	1	Cincinnati Open, United States	Hard	SF	7–6^{(8–6)}, 3–6, 6–3	7	
29.	(Poland) Hubert Hurkacz	10	Astana Open, Kazakhstan	Hard (i)	QF	7–6^{(10–8)}, 6–3	6	
30.	Andrey Rublev	9	Astana Open, Kazakhstan	Hard (i)	SF	4–6, 6–4, 6–3	6	
31.	Daniil Medvedev	5	ATP Finals, Italy	Hard (i)	RR	6–3, 6–7^{(11–13)}, 7–6^{(7–1)}	3	
2023
32.	(Germany) Alexander Zverev	9	Paris Masters, France	Hard (i)	3R	7–6^{(7–2)}, 6–4	6	
2024
33.	(Germany) Alexander Zverev	5	Monte-Carlo Masters, France	Clay	3R	7–5, 7–6^{(7–3)}	12	
34.	(Italy) Jannik Sinner	2	Monte-Carlo Masters, France	Clay	SF	6–4, 3–6, 6–4	12	
35.	(Norway) Casper Ruud	10	Monte-Carlo Masters, France	Clay	F	6–1, 6–4	12	
2026
36.	(United States) Taylor Fritz	9	United Cup, Australia	Hard	QF	6–4, 7–5	34	
37.	(Australia) Alex de Minaur	6	Miami Open, United States	Hard	2R	6–3, 7–6^{(7–3)}	51	

== Grand Slam tournament seedings ==
The tournaments won by Tsitsipas are in boldface, and advanced into by Tsitsipas are in italics.
Unseeded or seeded 32–11
Not seeded at all, or not seeded inside the top 10 Seeded 10–4 Seeded no. 3 Seeded no. 2 Seeded no. 1

Year	Australian Open	French Open	Wimbledon	US Open
2017	did not qualify	Qualified	Qualified	did not qualify
2018	not seeded	not seeded	31st	15th
2019	14th	6th	7th	8th
2020	6th	5th	tournament cancelled*	4th
2021	5th	5th (1)	3rd	3rd
2022	4th	4th	4th	4th
2023	3rd (2)	5th	5th	7th
2024	7th	9th	11th	11th
2025	11th	20th	24th	26th
2026	31st	not seeded	not seeded	

* Due to the COVID-19 pandemic, the 2020 Wimbledon Championships of the tournament was cancelled.

== ATP Tour career earnings ==
Year	Majors	ATP wins	Total wins	Earnings ($)	Money list rank
2013	0	0	0	$692
2014	0	0	0	$1,794
2015	0	0	0	$8,672	841
2016	0	0	0	$33,270	386
2017	0	0	0	$306,584	133
2018	0	1	1	$2,585,667	13
2019	0	3	3	$7,488,927	6
2020	0	1	1	$2,106,450	7
2021	0	2	2	$3,579,155	4
2022	0	2	2	$6,614,416	5
2023	0	1	1	$5,489,110	7
2024	0	1	1	$4,293,441	10
2025	0	0	0	$2,208,778	26
2026	0	0	0	$709,631	27
Career*	0	11	11	$37,511,224	11

* Statistics correct as of 13 April 2026.

== Exhibitions and charity matches ==
=== Tournament finals ===
==== Singles ====
Result	Date	Tournament	Surface	Opponent	Score
Loss	Dec 2019	Mubadala Championship, United Arab Emirates	Hard	(Spain) Rafael Nadal	7–6^{(7–3)}, 5–7, 6–7^{(3–7)}
Loss	Jul 2020	Ultimate Tennis Showdown, Sophia Antipolis, France	Hard	(Italy) Matteo Berrettini	15–16, 12–15, 14–12, 15–8, 2–3

=== Matches ===
==== Singles ====
Result	Date	Match	Surface	Opponent	Score
Loss	Jun 2015	Boodles Challenge, United Kingdom	Grass	(United States) Taylor Fritz	4–6, 2–6
Loss	Jun 2016	Boodles Challenge, United Kingdom	Grass	(Spain) Guillermo García López	2–6, 4–6
Loss	Jun 2018	Boodles Challenge, United Kingdom	Grass	(Bulgaria) Grigor Dimitrov	6–7^{(4–7)}, 1–6
Loss	Jun 2018	Boodles Challenge, United Kingdom	Grass	(United States) Taylor Fritz	5–7, 3–6
Win	Jun 2018	Boodles Challenge, United Kingdom	Grass	(United Kingdom) James Ward	7–5, 6–1
Win	Jun 2019	Boodles Challenge, United Kingdom	Grass	(Spain) Roberto Bautista Agut	6–4, 6–4
Loss	Jun 2019	Boodles Challenge, United Kingdom	Grass	(Russia) Karen Khachanov	6–3, 3–6, [8–10]
Win	Jan 2020	Kooyong Classic, Australia	Hard	(Italy) Matteo Berrettini	7–6^{(7–4)}, 7–6^{(7–6)}
Win	Jun 2023	Boodles Challenge, United Kingdom	Grass	(Spain) Alejandro Davidovich Fokina	6–4, 6–4
Loss	Jul 2023	Boodles Challenge, United Kingdom	Grass	(Serbia) Dušan Lajović	7–6^{(7–3)}, 4–6, [7–10]
Loss	Jan 2024	Australian Open Opening Week, Australia	Hard	(Serbia) Novak Djokovic	3–6
Loss	Jan 2025	Australian Open Opening Week, Australia	Hard	(Italy) Jannik Sinner	3–6, 6–7^{(5–7)}

=== Team competitions ===
Result	Date	Event	Surface	Team	Partners	Opponent team	Opponent players	Score
Loss	Jan 2020	AO Rally for Relief, Melbourne, Australia	Hard	Team Wozniacki	(Denmark) Caroline Wozniacki (C) (Germany) Alexander Zverev (Japan) Naomi Osaka (United States) Coco Gauff	Team Williams	(United States) Serena Williams (C) (Spain) Rafael Nadal (Serbia) Novak Djokovic (Austria) Dominic Thiem (Czech Republic) Petra Kvitová	3–4^{(2–5)}

== See also ==
- Greece Davis Cup team
- Sport in Greece
- ATP Finals appearances
- Fastest recorded tennis serves
