= 2014 Boodles Challenge =

- Date: 17 – 21 June 2014
- Edition: 13th
- Category: Exhibition tournament
- Surface: Grass
- Location: Stoke Poges, Buckinghamshire; United Kingdom
← 2013 ·	Boodles Challenge	· 2015 →

The 2014 Boodles Challenge was an exhibition tournament held before Wimbledon to serve as a warm-up to players. Taking place from 17 to 21 June 2014 at Stoke Park in London, it was the 13th edition of the Boodles Challenge. Robin Haase won the title.

== Participants ==
On 23 May, the tournament organisers announced a list of 10 players that would participate in the tournament:

- (South Africa) Kevin Anderson
- (Croatia) Marin Čilić
- (Serbia) Novak Djokovic
- (Italy) Fabio Fognini
- (Latvia) Ernests Gulbis
- (Germany) Tommy Haas
- (Netherlands) Robin Haase
- (Poland) Jerzy Janowicz
- (Canada) Milos Raonic
- (United States) Jack Sock

== Results ==
=== Day 1 (17 June) ===
Matches on Stoke Park
Winner	Loser	Score
(Latvia) Ernests Gulbis	(Canada) Milos Raonic	7–6^{(7–3)}, 7–6^{(7–5)}
(South Africa) Kevin Anderson	(Austria) Dominic Thiem	6–4, 7–6^{(9–7)}
(United States) Jack Sock	(United States) John Isner	7–6^{(9–7)}, 2–6, [12–10]

=== Day 2 (18 June) ===
Matches on Stoke Park
Winner	Loser	Score
(Canada) Milos Raonic	(Netherlands) Robin Haase	4–6, 6–4, [10–5]
(Germany) Philipp Kohlschreiber	(Italy) Fabio Fognini	7–5, 4–6, [10–4]
(South Africa) Kevin Anderson	(United States) Jack Sock	6–4, 3–6, [10–6]

=== Day 3 (19 June) ===
Matches on Stoke Park
Winner	Loser	Score
(Serbia) Novak Djokovic vs (Netherlands) Robin Haase		Not played ^{1}
(Netherlands) Robin Haase	(United States) John Isner	6–4, 7–6^{(7–3)}
(Latvia) Ernests Gulbis	(Italy) Fabio Fognini	7–5, 6–3
(United States) Jack Sock	(Austria) Dominic Thiem	6–1, 6–7^{(4–7)}, [10–7]

^{1}Djokovic withdrew from the match to prevent further injury to his right wrist, in order to be able to compete at the 2014 Wimbledon Championships.

=== Day 4 (20 June) ===
Matches on Stoke Park
Winner	Loser	Score
(Poland) Jerzy Janowicz	(United States) Jack Sock	6–3, 3–6, [10–8]
(Croatia) Marin Čilić	(Italy) Fabio Fognini	6–3, 6–3
(Germany) Philipp Kohlschreiber	(United States) John Isner	6–3, 6–3

=== Day 5 (21 June) ===
Matches on Stoke Park
Winner	Loser	Score
(Netherlands) Robin Haase	(Germany) Jan-Lennard Struff	6–3, 6–7^{(1–7)}, [10–7]
(Spain) Guillermo García-López	(South Africa) Kevin Anderson	6–4, 7–6^{(7–3)}
(Sweden) Johan Brunström (Denmark) Frederik Nielsen	(United Kingdom) Ken Skupski (United Kingdom) Neal Skupski	2–6, 6–3, [11–9]
