= 2012 Boodles Challenge =

Exhibition tournament in London, England

- Date: 19 – 23 June
- Edition: 11th
- Category: Exhibition tournament
- Surface: Grass
- Location: Stoke Poges, Buckinghamshire; United Kingdom
← 2011 ·	Boodles Challenge	· 2013 →

The 2012 Boodles Challenge was an exhibition tournament held before Wimbledon to serve as a warm-up to players. Taking place from 19 June 2012 to 23 June 2012 at Stoke Park in London, it was the 11th edition of the Boodles Challenge. Marin Čilić won the title.

== Participants ==
On 21 March 2012, the tournament organisers released a preliminary list of 5 players that will compete in the tournament:

- (Argentina) Juan Martín del Potro
- (Ukraine) Alexandr Dolgopolov
- (France) Richard Gasquet
- (France) Gaël Monfils
- (Switzerland) Stanislas Wawrinka

Later, between May and June, 6 more players were confirmed:

- (Croatia) Marin Čilić
- (Serbia) Novak Djokovic
- (United States) John Isner
- (United Kingdom) Andy Murray
- (France) Gilles Simon
- (Serbia) Janko Tipsarević

== Results ==
=== Day 1 (June 19) ===
Matches on Stoke Park
Winner	Loser	Score
(Switzerland) Stanislas Wawrinka	(Serbia) Janko Tipsarević	1–6, 7–6^{(7–5)}, [10–8]
(France) Gilles Simon	(Ukraine) Alexandr Dolgopolov	4–6, 6–3, [10–7]
(Spain) Fernando Verdasco	(Latvia) Ernests Gulbis	6–7^{(4–7)}, 7–6^{(7–5)}, [10–4]

=== Day 2 (June 20) ===
Matches on Stoke Park
Winner	Loser	Score
(Serbia) Janko Tipsarević	(United Kingdom) Andy Murray	6–7^{(5–7)}, 6–4, [10–7]
(Croatia) Marin Čilić	(United States) John Isner	6–4, 6–4
(Argentina) David Nalbandian	(Spain) Nicolás Almagro	3–6, 6–3, [10–4]

=== Day 3 (June 21) ===
Matches on Stoke Park
Winner	Loser	Score
(Serbia) Novak Djokovic	(United Kingdom) Andy Murray	6–4, 6–4
(Argentina) Juan Martín del Potro vs (Ukraine) Alexandr Dolgopolov		6–1, 2–5, unfinished (rain)
(Switzerland) Stanislas Wawrinka vs (France) Gilles Simon		Match not held (rain)

=== Day 4 (June 22) ===
Matches on Stoke Park
Winner	Loser	Score
(United States) John Isner	(Spain) Fernando Verdasco	7–6^{(7–2)}, 2–6, [10–5]
(Croatia) Marin Čilić	(Spain) Nicolás Almagro	4–6, 6–3, [12–10]
(United Kingdom) Oliver Golding	(Argentina) Juan Mónaco	6–3, 6–4

=== Day 5 (June 23) ===
Matches on Stoke Park
Winner	Loser	Score
(Croatia) Marin Čilić	(Argentina) Juan Mónaco	4–6, 6–3, [10–1]
(Netherlands) Robin Haase	(Spain) Nicolás Almagro	6–3, 6–3
(Spain) Guillermo García-López	(Spain) Albert Ramos	7–5, 6–4
