= 2017 Boodles Challenge =

- Date: 27 June – 1 July 2016
- Edition: 16th
- Category: Exhibition tournament
- Surface: Grass
- Location: Stoke Poges, Buckinghamshire; United Kingdom
← 2016 ·	Boodles Challenge	· 2018 →

The 2017 Boodles Challenge was an exhibition tournament held before Wimbledon to serve as a warm-up to players. Taking place from 27 June to 1 July 2017 at Stoke Park in London, it was the 16th edition of the Boodles Challenge. As with last year, no player was declared champion.

== Participants ==
On 21 June, the tournament organizers announced a preliminary list with 12 confirmed players for this edition:

- (Spain) Roberto Bautista Agut
- (Spain) Pablo Carreño Busta
- (Argentina) Juan Martín del Potro
- (Latvia) Ernests Gulbis
- (Germany) Philipp Kohlschreiber
- (Australia) Thanasi Kokkinakis
- (Australia) Nick Kyrgios
- (France) Benoît Paire
- (Spain) Albert Ramos Viñolas
- (France) Gilles Simon
- (Germany) Alexander Zverev
- (Belgium) ~~David Goffin~~ (withdrew due to a right ankle injury suffered during the French Open)

== Results ==
=== Day 1 (27 June) ===
Matches on Stoke Park
Winner	Loser	Score
(Croatia) Borna Ćorić	(Lithuania) Ričardas Berankis	6–3, 6–3
(Australia) Thanasi Kokkinakis	(France) Gilles Simon	6–4, 6–2
(France) Benoît Paire vs. (Canada) Denis Shapovalov		Not played
(Germany) Jan-Lennard Struff vs. (United Kingdom) James Ward		Not played

The last two matches of the day were cancelled due to rain.

=== Day 2 (28 June) ===
Matches on Stoke Park
Winner	Loser	Score
(Canada) Denis Shapovalov vs. (Lithuania) Ričardas Berankis		4–4, suspended
(Argentina) Juan Martín del Potro	(France) Gilles Simon	6–3, 3–6, [10–5]
(Germany) Philipp Kohlschreiber	(Spain) Albert Ramos Viñolas	6–3, 3–6, [10–4]
(Germany) Jan-Lennard Struff	(France) Benoît Paire	7–6^{(11–9)}, 6–2

The Shapovalov vs Berankis match was cancelled due to rain, with the score tied 4–4 in the 1st set.

=== Day 3 (29 June) ===
Matches on Stoke Park
Winner	Loser	Score
(United Kingdom) James Ward	(Spain) Albert Ramos Viñolas	9–6
(Australia) Nick Kyrgios	(Germany) Philipp Kohlschreiber	6–4, 6–4
(Germany) Alexander Zverev	(Australia) Thanasi Kokkinakis	7–6^{(7–4)}, 6–7^{(4–7)}, [10–2]
(Germany) Jan-Lennard Struff	(Spain) Roberto Bautista Agut	2–6, 7–6^{(9–7)}, [10–4]

=== Day 4 (30 June) ===
Matches on Stoke Park
Winner	Loser	Score
(Russia) Andrey Kuznetsov	(Germany) Jan-Lennard Struff	7–6^{(7–4)}, 7–5
(Australia) Nick Kyrgios	(Serbia) Viktor Troicki	6–7^{(3–7)}, 6–2, [10–8]
(Spain) Roberto Bautista Agut	(France) Benoît Paire	6–2, 6–1
(Canada) Denis Shapovalov	(Spain) Albert Ramos Viñolas	6–3, 6–4

=== Day 5 (1 July) ===
Matches on Stoke Park
Winner	Loser	Score
(United States) Sebastian Korda	(Colombia) Nicolás Mejía	10–9
(Australia) Thanasi Kokkinakis	(Bosnia and Herzegovina) Damir Džumhur	5–7, 7–6^{(7–3)}, [10–8]
(Germany) Dustin Brown	(Argentina) Renzo Olivo	7–5, 6–3
(United Kingdom) Scott Clayton (United Kingdom) Jonny O'Mara	(United Kingdom) Jay Clarke (United Kingdom) Marcus Willis	6–2, 6–2
