= Boodles Challenge =

The Boodles

Exhibition
- Founded: 2002
- Location: Stoke Poges, Buckinghamshire; Great Britain
- Venue: Stoke Park
- Category: Exhibition
- Surface: Grass
- Website: Official website

The Boodles Tennis Challenge (former Boodle and Dunthorne Champions Challenge) is an international five-day tennis exhibition held at Stoke Park in Buckinghamshire, England. It was founded in 2002 by sports agent Patricio Apey, in coordination with luxury jeweller Boodles, to help give his clients more grass court match practice in the lead-up to Wimbledon. It is played in a style similar to the AAMI Classic, giving the players at least three matches each and allowing non-competition players to appear in one match per day. Previous competitors include Andre Agassi, Pete Sampras, Tim Henman, Marat Safin, James Blake, Andy Roddick, Fernando González, David Nalbandian, Novak Djokovic, Fernando Verdasco, Jo-Wilfried Tsonga, Andy Murray, Maria Sharapova, Viktoria Azarenka and Monica Puig. The 2025 event featured Andrey Rublev, Hubert Hurkacz, Christopher Eubanks and David Goffin.

Attendance is limited to 1,900 people per day.

The tournament was cancelled in 2020 and 2021 because of the COVID-19 pandemic in the United Kingdom. The tournament was also cancelled in 2022 due to renovations at Stoke Park. The tournament returned on 20 June 2023.

== Winners by year ==
Year	Champion
2025	No champion declared
2024	No champion declared
2023	No champion declared
2022	Tournament cancelled
2021	Tournament cancelled
2020	Tournament cancelled
2019	No champion declared
2018	No champion declared
2017	No champion declared
2016	No champion declared
2015	No champion declared
2014	(Netherlands) Robin Haase
2013	(Serbia) Viktor Troicki
2012	(Croatia) Marin Čilić
2011	(Spain) David Ferrer
2010	(France) Gaël Monfils
2009	(Germany) Philipp Kohlschreiber
2008	(Germany) Nicolas Kiefer
2007	(Spain) Fernando Verdasco
2006	(Russia) Mikhail Youzhny
2005	(Chile) Fernando González
2004	(Croatia) Ivan Ljubičić
2003	(Australia) Mark Philippoussis
2002	(Belarus) Max Mirnyi
