= 2021 Monte-Carlo Masters – Singles =

Tennis tournament event

Singles
- 2021 Monte-Carlo Masters

Final
- Champion: (Greece) Stefanos Tsitsipas
- Runner-up: (Russia) Andrey Rublev
- Score: 6–3, 6–3

Details
- Draw: 56 (7 Q / 4 WC )
- Seeds: 16

Events
| Singles | Doubles |
| ← 2019 · | Monte-Carlo Masters | · 2022 → |

Stefanos Tsitsipas defeated Andrey Rublev in the final, 6–3, 6–3 to win the singles tennis title at the 2021 Monte-Carlo Masters. It was his first ATP Tour Masters 1000 title, making him the first Greek to win a Masters tournament. Rublev was also in contention for his maiden Masters 1000 title.

Fabio Fognini was the defending champion from when the tournament was last held in 2019, but lost to Casper Ruud in the quarterfinals.

== Seeds ==
The top eight seeds received a bye into the second round.

1. (Serbia) Novak Djokovic (third round)
2. (Russia) Daniil Medvedev (withdrew, tested positive for COVID-19)
3. (Spain) Rafael Nadal (quarterfinals)
4. (Greece) Stefanos Tsitsipas (champion)
5. (Germany) Alexander Zverev (third round)
6. (Russia) Andrey Rublev (final)
7. (Argentina) Diego Schwartzman (second round)
8. (Italy) Matteo Berrettini (second round)

9. (Spain) Roberto Bautista Agut (third round)
10. (France) Gaël Monfils (withdrew)
11. (Belgium) David Goffin (quarterfinals)
12. (Spain) Pablo Carreño Busta (third round)
13. (Poland) Hubert Hurkacz (second round)
14. (Bulgaria) Grigor Dimitrov (third round)
15. (Italy) Fabio Fognini (quarterfinals)
16. (Chile) Cristian Garín (third round)

Click on the seed number of a player to go to their draw section.

== Draw ==
=== Key ===
- Q = Qualifier
- WC = Wild card
- LL = Lucky loser
- Alt = Alternate
- SE = Special exempt
- PR = Protected ranking
- ITF = ITF entry
- JE = Junior exempt
- w/o = Walkover
- r = Retired
- d = Defaulted
- SR = Special ranking

=== Finals ===
Quarterfinals
(United Kingdom) Dan Evans | 5 | 6 | 6
11 | (Belgium) David Goffin | 7 | 3 | 4
4 | (Greece) Stefanos Tsitsipas | 7 | 0
(Spain) Alejandro Davidovich Fokina | 5 | 0^{r}
6 | (Russia) Andrey Rublev | 6 | 4 | 6
3 | (Spain) Rafael Nadal | 2 | 6 | 2
(Norway) Casper Ruud | 6 | 6
15 | (Italy) Fabio Fognini | 4 | 3

Semifinals
(United Kingdom) Dan Evans | 2 | 1
4 | (Greece) Stefanos Tsitsipas | 6 | 6
6 | (Russia) Andrey Rublev | 6 | 7
(Norway) Casper Ruud | 3 | 5

Final
4 | (Greece) Stefanos Tsitsipas | 6 | 6
6 | (Russia) Andrey Rublev | 3 | 3

=== Top half ===
==== Section 1 ====
First round
(Spain) A Ramos Viñolas | 3 | 4
(Italy) J Sinner | 6 | 6
(United Kingdom) D Evans | 6 | 6^{11} | 6
(Serbia) D Lajović | 3 | 7^{13} | 2
Q | (Italy) T Fabbiano | 3 | 6 | 3
13 | (Poland) H Hurkacz | 6 | 3 | 6
11 | (Belgium) D Goffin | 6 | 3 | 6
(Croatia) M Čilić | 4 | 6 | 0
Q | (Italy) M Cecchinato | 6 | 6
Q | (Germany) D Koepfer | 4 | 3
(Italy) L Sonego | 6 | 6
(Hungary) M Fucsovics | 3 | 4

Second round
1 | (Serbia) N Djokovic | 6 | 6
(Italy) J Sinner | 4 | 2
(United Kingdom) D Evans | 6 | 6
13 | (Poland) H Hurkacz | 4 | 1
11 | (Belgium) D Goffin | 6 | 6
Q | (Italy) M Cecchinato | 4 | 0
(Italy) L Sonego | 3 | 3
5 | (Germany) A Zverev | 6 | 6

Third round
1 | (Serbia) N Djokovic | 4 | 5
(United Kingdom) D Evans | 6 | 7
11 | (Belgium) D Goffin | 6 | 7^{9}
5 | (Germany) A Zverev | 4 | 6^{7}

Quarterfinals
(United Kingdom) D Evans | 5 | 6 | 6
11 | (Belgium) D Goffin | 7 | 3 | 4

==== Section 2 ====
First round
WC | (Italy) L Musetti | 3 | 4
(Russia) A Karatsev | 6 | 6
(Australia) J Millman | 6 | 6
(France) U Humbert | 3 | 3
(Canada) F Auger-Aliassime | 6^{3} | 1
16 | (Chile) C Garín | 7^{7} | 6
Q | (Australia) A Popyrin | 0 | 6 | 7^{7}
(Spain) P Andújar | 6 | 2 | 6^{3}
(Argentina) G Pella | 3 | 4
WC | (France) L Pouille | 6 | 6
(Spain) A Davidovich Fokina | 6 | 7^{7}
(Australia) A de Minaur | 4 | 6^{3}

Second round
4 | (Greece) S Tsitsipas | 6 | 6
(Russia) A Karatsev | 3 | 4
(Australia) J Millman | 1 | 4
16 | (Chile) C Garín | 6 | 6
Q | (Australia) A Popyrin | 5 | 6 | 3
WC | (France) L Pouille | 7 | 2 | 6
(Spain) A Davidovich Fokina | 7 | 6
8 | (Italy) M Berrettini | 5 | 3

Third round
4 | (Greece) S Tsitsipas | 6 | 6
16 | (Chile) C Garín | 3 | 4
WC | (France) L Pouille | 2 | 6^{2}
(Spain) A Davidovich Fokina | 6 | 7^{7}

Quarterfinals
4 | (Greece) S Tsitsipas | 7 | 0
(Spain) A Davidovich Fokina | 5 | 0^{r}

=== Bottom half ===
==== Section 3 ====
First round
Q | (Italy) S Caruso | 6^{3} | 7^{7} | 6
WC | (Monaco) L Catarina | 7^{7} | 6^{5} | 3
(United States) T Paul | 4
LL | (Spain) P Martínez | 1^{r}
(United States) T Fritz | 2 | 5
9 | (Spain) R Bautista Agut | 6 | 7
14 | (Bulgaria) G Dimitrov | 6 | 6
(Germany) J-L Struff | 3 | 4
(France) J Chardy | 6 | 0 | 7
(Kazakhstan) A Bublik | 4 | 6 | 5
Q | (Argentina) F Delbonis | 7 | 6
(France) A Mannarino | 5 | 1

Second round
6 | (Russia) A Rublev | 6 | 6
Q | (Italy) S Caruso | 3 | 2
(United States) T Paul | 3 | 4
9 | (Spain) R Bautista Agut | 6 | 6
14 | (Bulgaria) G Dimitrov | 7^{7} | 6
(France) J Chardy | 6^{3} | 4
Q | (Argentina) F Delbonis | 1 | 2
3 | (Spain) R Nadal | 6 | 6

Third round
6 | (Russia) A Rublev | 7^{7} | 5 | 6
9 | (Spain) R Bautista Agut | 6^{2} | 7 | 3
14 | (Bulgaria) G Dimitrov | 1 | 1
3 | (Spain) R Nadal | 6 | 6

Quarterfinals
6 | (Russia) A Rublev | 6 | 4 | 6
3 | (Spain) R Nadal | 2 | 6 | 2

==== Section 4 ====
First round
WC | (Denmark) H Rune | 2 | 1
(Norway) C Ruud | 6 | 6
(Russia) K Khachanov | 6 | 6
(Serbia) L Đere | 4 | 1
Q | (Italy) S Travaglia | 5 | 6^{4}
12 | (Spain) P Carreño Busta | 7 | 7^{7}
15 | (Italy) F Fognini | 6 | 7
(Serbia) M Kecmanović | 2 | 5
(Australia) J Thompson | 6 | 6^{3} | 7^{7}
(France) B Paire | 4 | 7^{7} | 6^{5}
(Serbia) F Krajinović | 6 | 2
(Georgia (country)) N Basilashvili | 1 | 0^{r}

Second round
7 | (Argentina) D Schwartzman | 3 | 3
(Norway) C Ruud | 6 | 6
(Russia) K Khachanov | 2 | 3
12 | (Spain) P Carreño Busta | 6 | 6
15 | (Italy) F Fognini | 6 | 6
(Australia) J Thompson | 3 | 3
(Serbia) F Krajinović | 6 | 6
LL | (Argentina) JI Londero | 0 | 3

Third round
(Norway) C Ruud | 7^{7} | 5 | 7
12 | (Spain) P Carreño Busta | 6^{4} | 7 | 5
15 | (Italy) F Fognini | 6 | 7^{7}
(Serbia) F Krajinović | 2 | 6^{1}

Quarterfinals
(Norway) C Ruud | 6 | 6
15 | (Italy) F Fognini | 4 | 3

== Qualifying ==
=== Seeds ===
1. (Germany) Dominik Koepfer (qualified)
2. (Italy) Stefano Travaglia (qualified)
3. (Czech Republic) Jiří Veselý (first round)
4. (France) Pierre-Hugues Herbert (first round)
5. (France) Corentin Moutet (first round)
6. (Brazil) Thiago Monteiro (first round)
7. (Belarus) Egor Gerasimov (first round)
8. (Australia) Alexei Popyrin (qualified)
9. (Argentina) Federico Delbonis (qualified)
10. (Argentina) Federico Coria (first round)
11. (Italy) Salvatore Caruso (qualified)
12. (Italy) Gianluca Mager (first round)
13. (Italy) Marco Cecchinato (qualified)
14. (Argentina) Juan Ignacio Londero (qualifying competition, lucky loser)

=== Qualifiers ===
1. (Germany) Dominik Koepfer
2. (Italy) Stefano Travaglia
3. (Australia) Alexei Popyrin
4. (Italy) Salvatore Caruso
5. (Argentina) Federico Delbonis
6. (Italy) Thomas Fabbiano
7. (Italy) Marco Cecchinato

=== Lucky losers ===
1. (Spain) Pedro Martínez
2. (Argentina) Juan Ignacio Londero

=== Qualifying draw ===
==== First qualifier ====
First round
1 | (Germany) Dominik Koepfer | 6 | 6
(Spain) Bernabé Zapata Miralles | 3 | 4
WC | (Germany) Mischa Zverev | 4 | 1
14 | (Argentina) Juan Ignacio Londero | 6 | 6

Qualifying competition
1 | (Germany) Dominik Koepfer | 6 | 6
14 | (Argentina) Juan Ignacio Londero | 1 | 3

==== Second qualifier ====
First round
2 | (Italy) Stefano Travaglia | 6 | 6
(India) Sumit Nagal | 3 | 0
(Poland) Kamil Majchrzak | 6 | 6
12 | (Italy) Gianluca Mager | 3 | 3

Qualifying competition
2 | (Italy) Stefano Travaglia | 6 | 3 | 6
(Poland) Kamil Majchrzak | 4 | 6 | 2

==== Third qualifier ====
First round
3 | (Czech Republic) Jiří Veselý | 5 | 3
(Germany) Yannick Hanfmann | 7 | 6
WC | (Monaco) Romain Arneodo | 2 | 4
8 | (Australia) Alexei Popyrin | 6 | 6

Qualifying competition
(Germany) Yannick Hanfmann | 6 | 5 | 4
8 | (Australia) Alexei Popyrin | 3 | 7 | 6

==== Fourth qualifier ====
First round
4 | (France) Pierre-Hugues Herbert | 3 | 5
WC | (Australia) Bernard Tomic | 6 | 7
(Slovakia) Martin Kližan | 3 | 4
11 | (Italy) Salvatore Caruso | 6 | 6

Qualifying competition
WC | (Australia) Bernard Tomic | 6^{2} | 0
11 | (Italy) Salvatore Caruso | 7^{7} | 6

==== Fifth qualifier ====
First round
5 | (France) Corentin Moutet | 5 | 6 | 0
(Spain) Pedro Martínez | 7 | 3 | 6
WC | (Italy) Roberto Marcora | 2 | 5
9 | (Argentina) Federico Delbonis | 6 | 7

Qualifying competition
(Spain) Pedro Martínez | 6 | 3 | 4
9 | (Argentina) Federico Delbonis | 3 | 6 | 6

==== Sixth qualifier ====
First round
6 | (Brazil) Thiago Monteiro | 5 | 2
(Portugal) João Sousa | 7 | 6
Alt | (Italy) Thomas Fabbiano | 7^{7} | 5 | 7^{7}
10 | (Argentina) Federico Coria | 6^{3} | 7 | 6^{3}

Qualifying competition
(Portugal) João Sousa | 5 | 4
Alt | (Italy) Thomas Fabbiano | 7 | 6

==== Seventh qualifier ====
First round
7 | (Belarus) Egor Gerasimov | 6 | 1 | 3
(Switzerland) Henri Laaksonen | 2 | 6 | 6
(Switzerland) Marc-Andrea Hüsler | 7^{7} | 6^{5} | 3
13 | (Italy) Marco Cecchinato | 6^{5} | 7^{7} | 6

Qualifying competition
(Switzerland) Henri Laaksonen | 1 | 3
13 | (Italy) Marco Cecchinato | 6 | 6
