= 2018 Boodles Challenge =

Tennis exhibition tournament

- Date: 26–30 June 2018
- Edition: 17th
- Category: Exhibition tournament
- Surface: Grass
- Location: Stoke Poges, Buckinghamshire; United Kingdom
← 2017 ·	Boodles Challenge	· 2019 →

The 2018 Boodles Challenge was an exhibition tournament held before Wimbledon to serve as a warm-up to players. Taking place from 26 June to 30 June 2018 at Stoke Park in London, it was the 17th edition of the Boodles Challenge. As with last year, no player was declared champion.

== Participants ==
- (Moldova) Radu Albot
- (South Africa) Kevin Anderson
- (Belarus) Victoria Azarenka
- (United Kingdom) Liam Broady
- (Spain) Pablo Carreño Busta
- (Argentina) Juan Martín del Potro
- (Italy) Fabio Fognini
- (United States) Taylor Fritz
- (Tunisia) Malek Jaziri
- (Australia) Thanasi Kokkinakis
- (United States) Sebastian Korda
- (Australia) Nick Kyrgios
- (France) Benoît Paire
- (Germany) Andrea Petkovic
- (Canada) Vasek Pospisil
- (Puerto Rico) Monica Puig
- (United States) Sam Querrey
- (Spain) Albert Ramos Viñolas
- (Italy) Andreas Seppi
- (Ukraine) Sergiy Stakhovsky
- (Australia) Bernard Tomic
- (Greece) Stefanos Tsitsipas
- (United Kingdom) James Ward
- (United Kingdom) Marcus Willis
- (Germany) Alexander Zverev

== Results ==
=== Day 1 (26 June) ===
Matches on Stoke Park
Winner	Loser	Score
(Germany) Andrea Petkovic	(Belarus) Victoria Azarenka	6–1, 6–3
(Bulgaria) Grigor Dimitrov	(Greece) Stefanos Tsitsipas	7–6^{(7–4)}, 6–1
(South Africa) Kevin Anderson	(Italy) Fabio Fognini	6–1, 6–2
(United Kingdom) Liam Broady	(France) Benoît Paire	7–6^{(7–2)}, 3–6, [10–7]

=== Day 2 (27 June) ===
Matches on Stoke Park
Winner	Loser	Score
(United Kingdom) Liam Broady	(Ukraine) Sergiy Stakhovsky	7–5, 4–6, [10–2]
(Argentina) Juan Martín del Potro	(United States) Taylor Fritz	6–4, 4–6, [15–13]
(Australia) Nick Kyrgios	(United States) Sam Querrey	6–2, 7–6^{(7–5)}
(Tunisia) Malek Jaziri	(United Kingdom) Marcus Willis	6–4, 6–7^{(1–7)}, [10–6]

=== Day 3 (28 June) ===
Matches on Stoke Park
Winner	Loser	Score
(Belarus) Victoria Azarenka	(Puerto Rico) Monica Puig	6–2, 6–2
(Germany) Alexander Zverev	(Spain) Pablo Carreño Busta	6–4, 6–4
(Spain) Albert Ramos-Viñolas	(Italy) Fabio Fognini	7–5, 6–4
(United States) Taylor Fritz	(Greece) Stefanos Tsitsipas	7–5, 6–3

=== Day 4 (29 June) ===
Matches on Stoke Park
Winner	Loser	Score
(Spain) Albert Ramos-Viñolas	(United Kingdom) Marcus Willis	4–6, 6–3, [11–9]
(United States) Sam Querrey	(France) Benoît Paire	6–2, 7–6^{(7–5)}
(Greece) Stefanos Tsitsipas	(United Kingdom) James Ward	7–5, 6–1
(Moldova) Radu Albot	(United States) Sebastian Korda	6–3, 6–4

=== Day 5 (30 June) ===
Matches on Stoke Park
Winner	Loser	Score
(United Kingdom) Marcus Willis	(United Kingdom) Liam Broady	4–6, 6–3, [10–8]
(Ukraine) Sergiy Stakhovsky	(Italy) Andreas Seppi	6–3, 6–3
(Australia) Thanasi Kokkinakis	(Australia) Bernard Tomic	7–6^{(7–5)}, 6–2
(Canada) Vasek Pospisil	(United Kingdom) James Ward	6–2, 6–1
