= 2024 Laver Cup =

Seventh edition of the Laver Cup, a men's tennis tournament

- Date: 20–22 September 2024
- Edition: 7th
- Surface: Hard (indoor)
- Location: Berlin, Germany
- Venue: Uber Arena

Champions
- Team Europe; 13 – 11
- Laver Cup

The 2024 Laver Cup was the seventh edition of the Laver Cup, a men's tennis tournament between teams from Europe and the rest of the world. It was held on an indoor hard court at the Uber Arena in Berlin, Germany from 20 until 22 September. Björn Borg and John McEnroe served as team captains for the last time. From 2025, Yannick Noah and Andre Agassi are set to replace them. Team World were attempting to win the Laver Cup for the third year in a row after defending the title the previous year. Team Europe won 13–11 to take an overall 5–2 lead in the series.

== Player selection ==
On 8 November 2023, Carlos Alcaraz was the first player to confirm his participation for Team Europe. On 8 February 2024, Daniil Medvedev and Alexander Zverev were the next players to announce their participation for this team.

On 11 April 2024, Alex de Minaur, Taylor Fritz and Tommy Paul were the first players to confirm their participation for Team World. Rafael Nadal was announced as the fourth player for Team Europe on 22 April 2024. Ben Shelton was confirmed for the event on 25 June 2024.

On 17 July 2024, Team Europe announced its final line-up with Casper Ruud and Stefanos Tsitsipas also taking part. Team World captain John McEnroe chose Frances Tiafoe and Alejandro Tabilo as his final picks on 19 August 2024.

On 12 September 2024, de Minaur, Paul and Nadal withdrew due to injuries and were replaced by Francisco Cerúndolo, Thanasi Kokkinakis and Grigor Dimitrov.

== Participants ==
Team Europe
Captain: (Sweden) Björn Borg
Vice-captain: (Sweden) Thomas Enqvist
Player	Rank
(Germany) Alexander Zverev	2
(Spain) Carlos Alcaraz	3
Daniil Medvedev	5
(Norway) Casper Ruud	9
(Spain) ~~Rafael Nadal~~	9^{PR(154)}
(Bulgaria) Grigor Dimitrov	10
(Greece) Stefanos Tsitsipas	12
(Italy) Flavio Cobolli	32
(Germany) Jan-Lennard Struff	37

Team World
Captain: (United States) John McEnroe
Vice-captain: (United States) Patrick McEnroe
Player	Rank
(United States) Taylor Fritz	7
(Australia) ~~Alex de Minaur~~	11
(United States) ~~Tommy Paul~~	13
(United States) Frances Tiafoe	16
(United States) Ben Shelton	17
(Chile) Alejandro Tabilo	22
(Argentina) Francisco Cerúndolo	31
(Australia) Thanasi Kokkinakis	78

- Singles rankings as of 16 September 2024
- PR = Protected ranking

Withdrew
Alternate

Team Europe

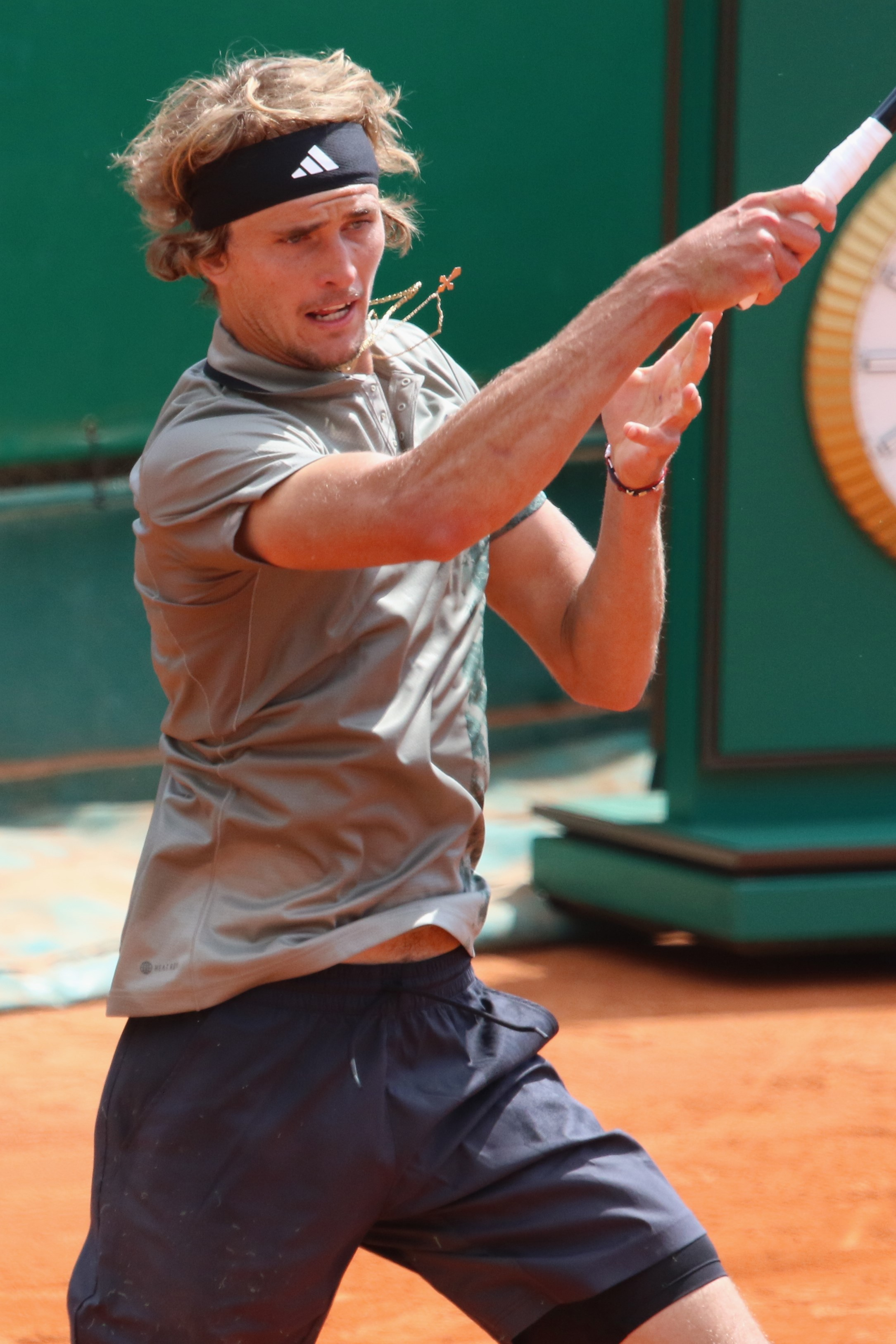
Zverev

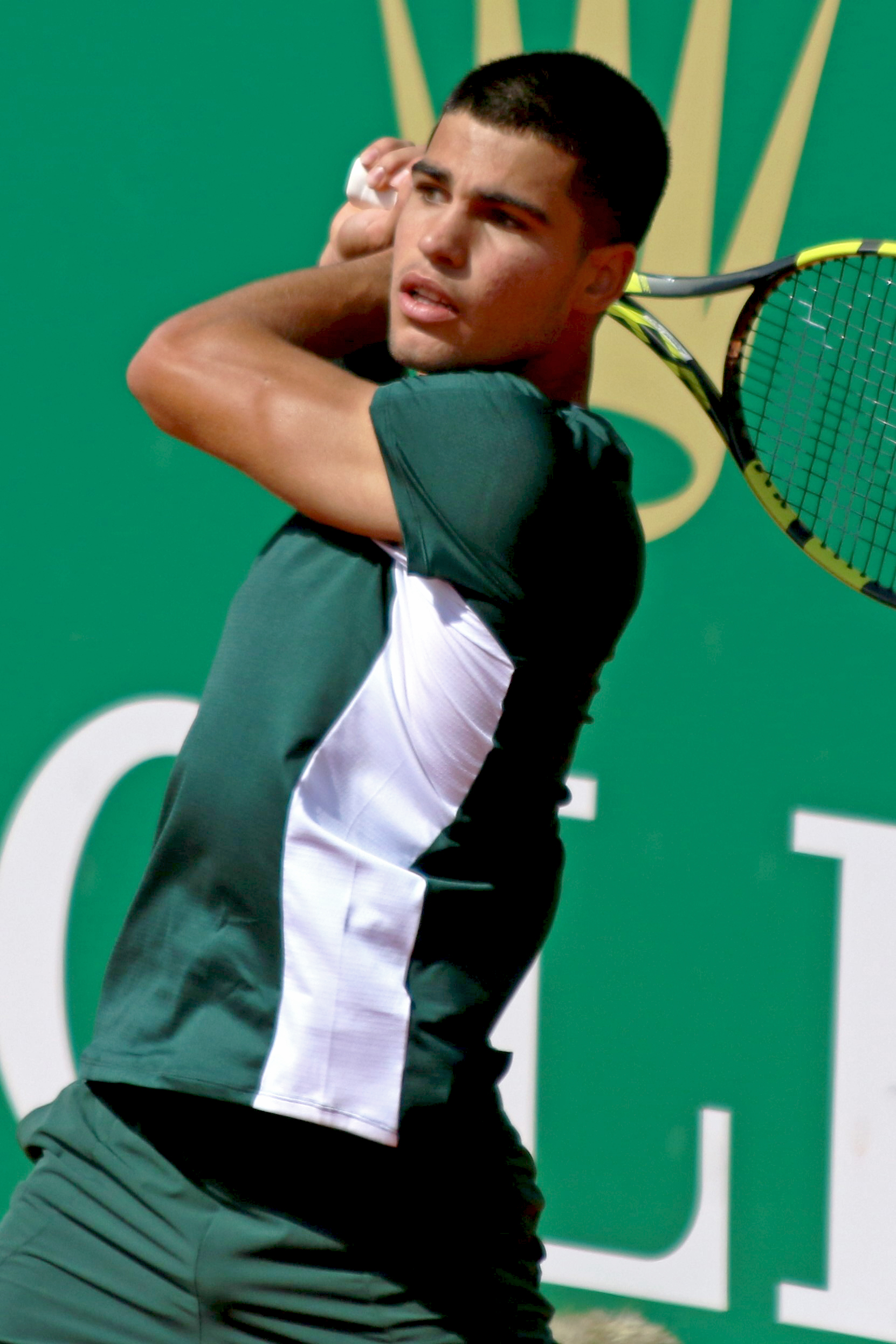
Alcaraz

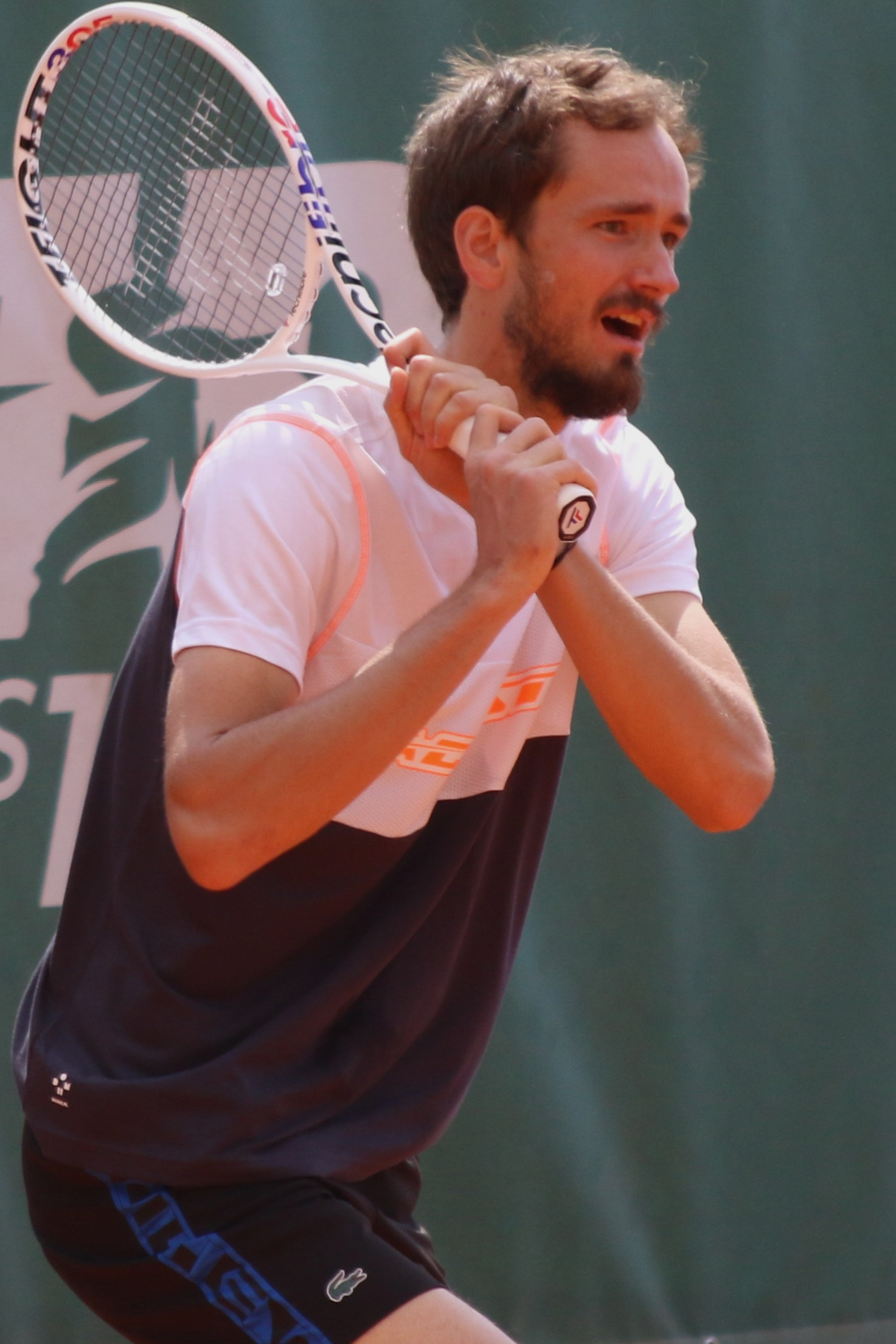
Medvedev

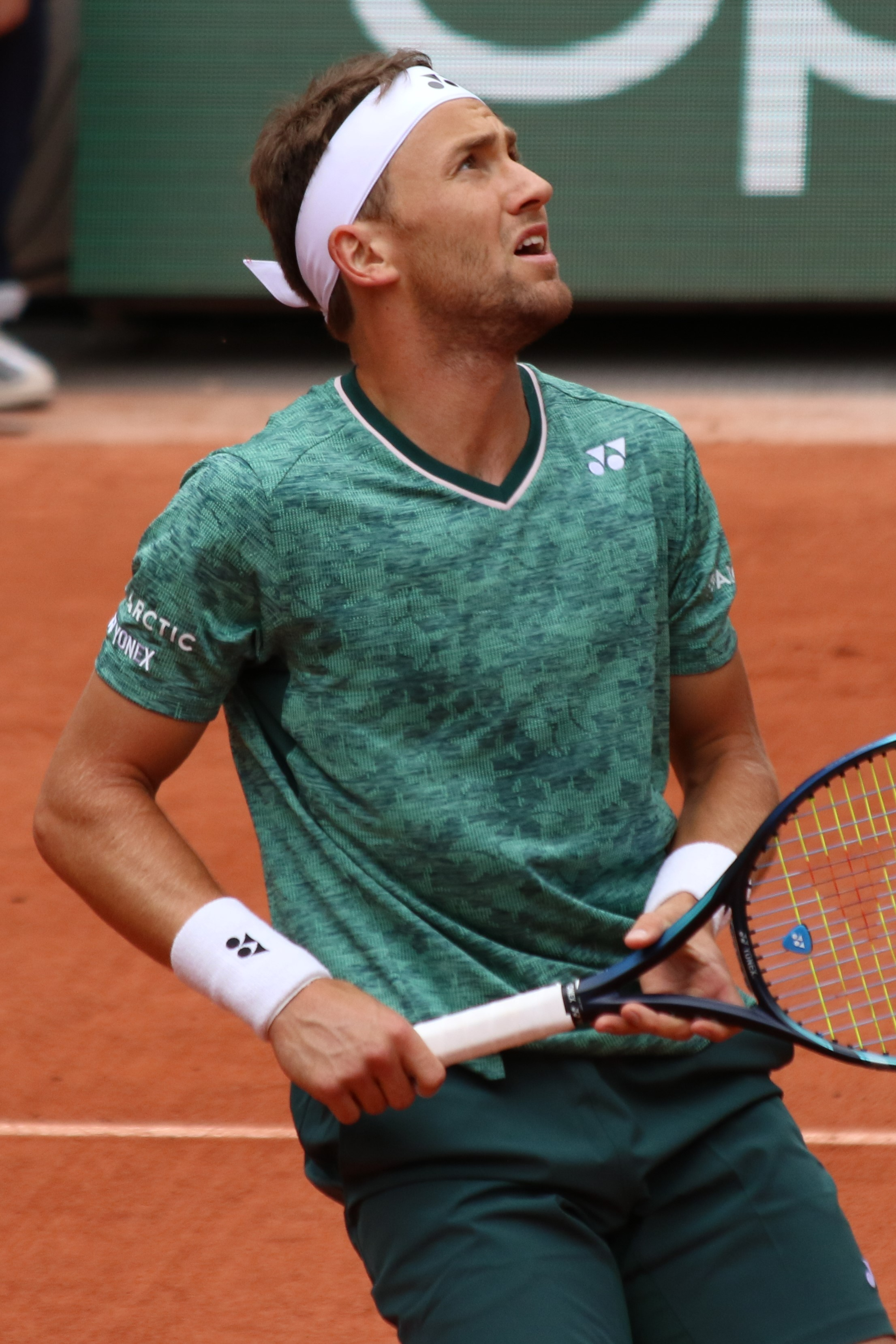
Ruud

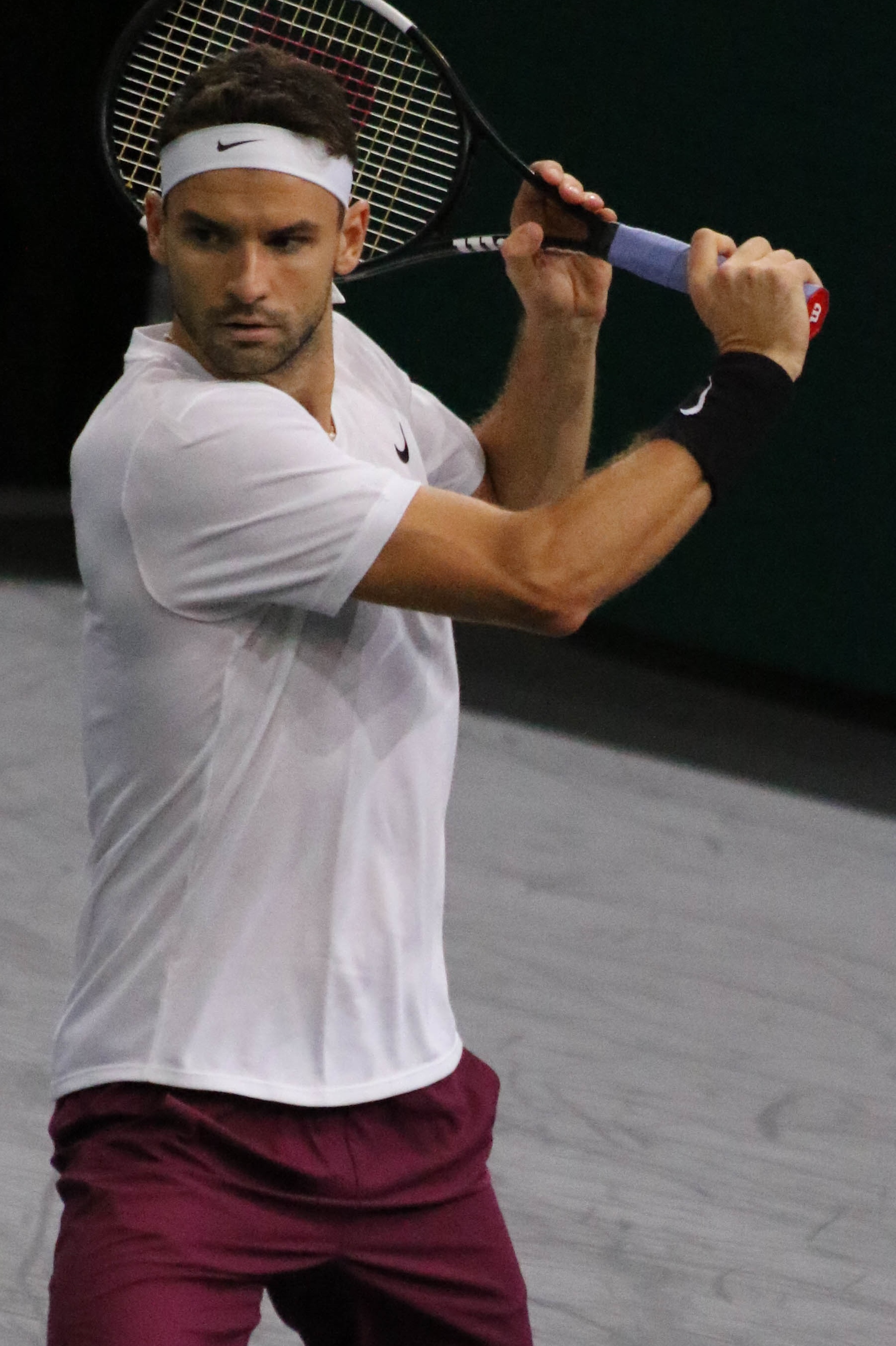
Dimitrov

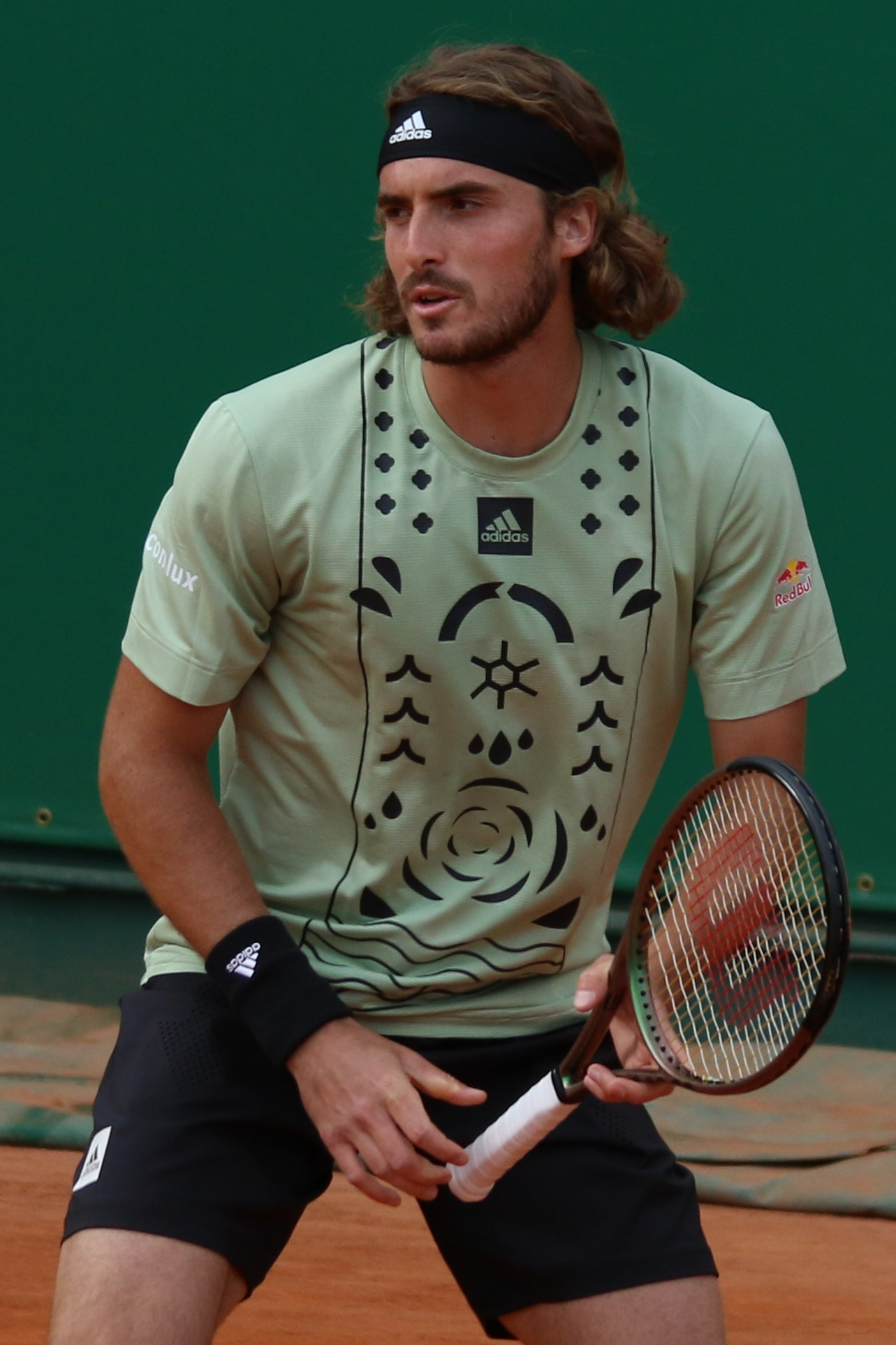
Tsitsipas

Team World

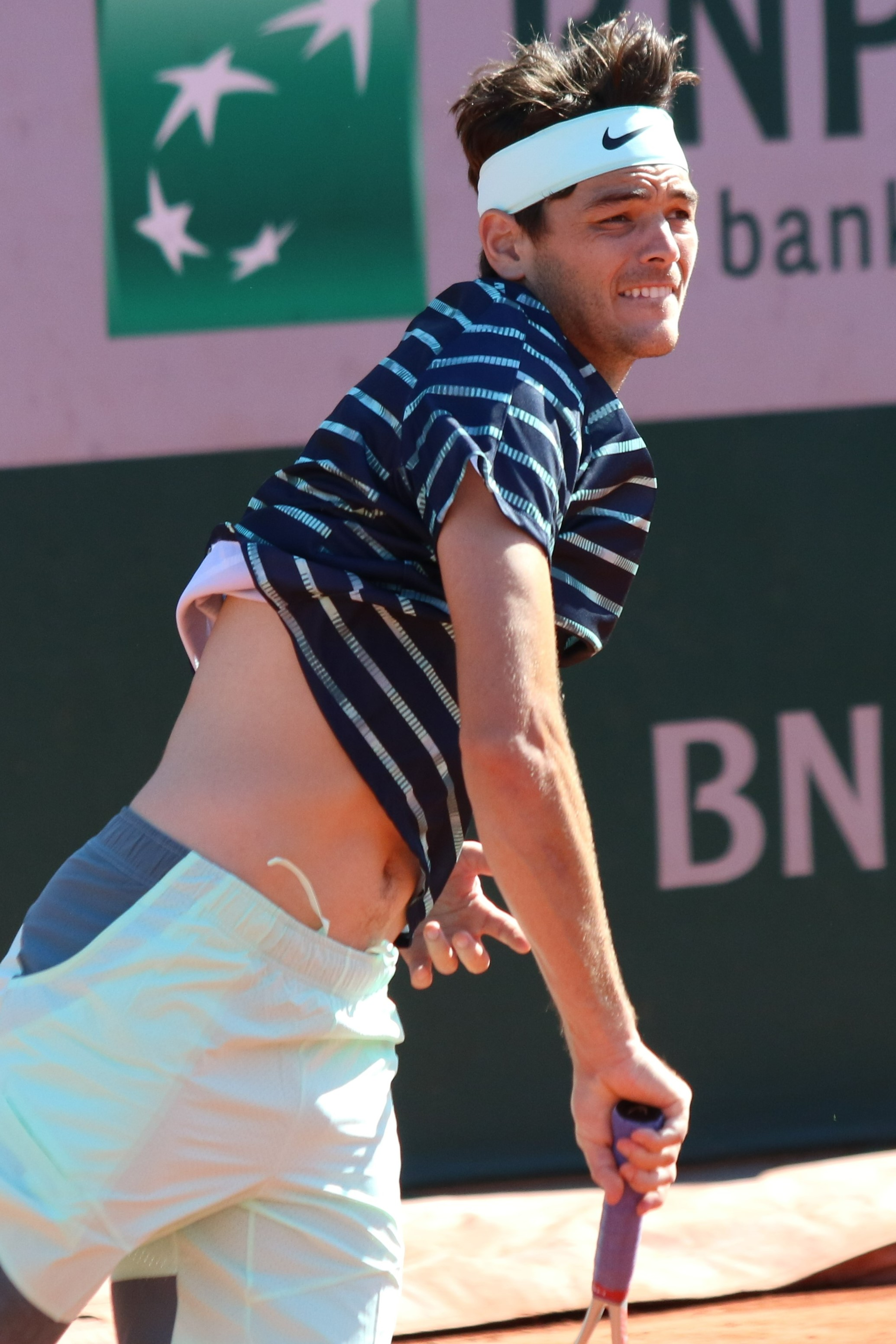
Fritz

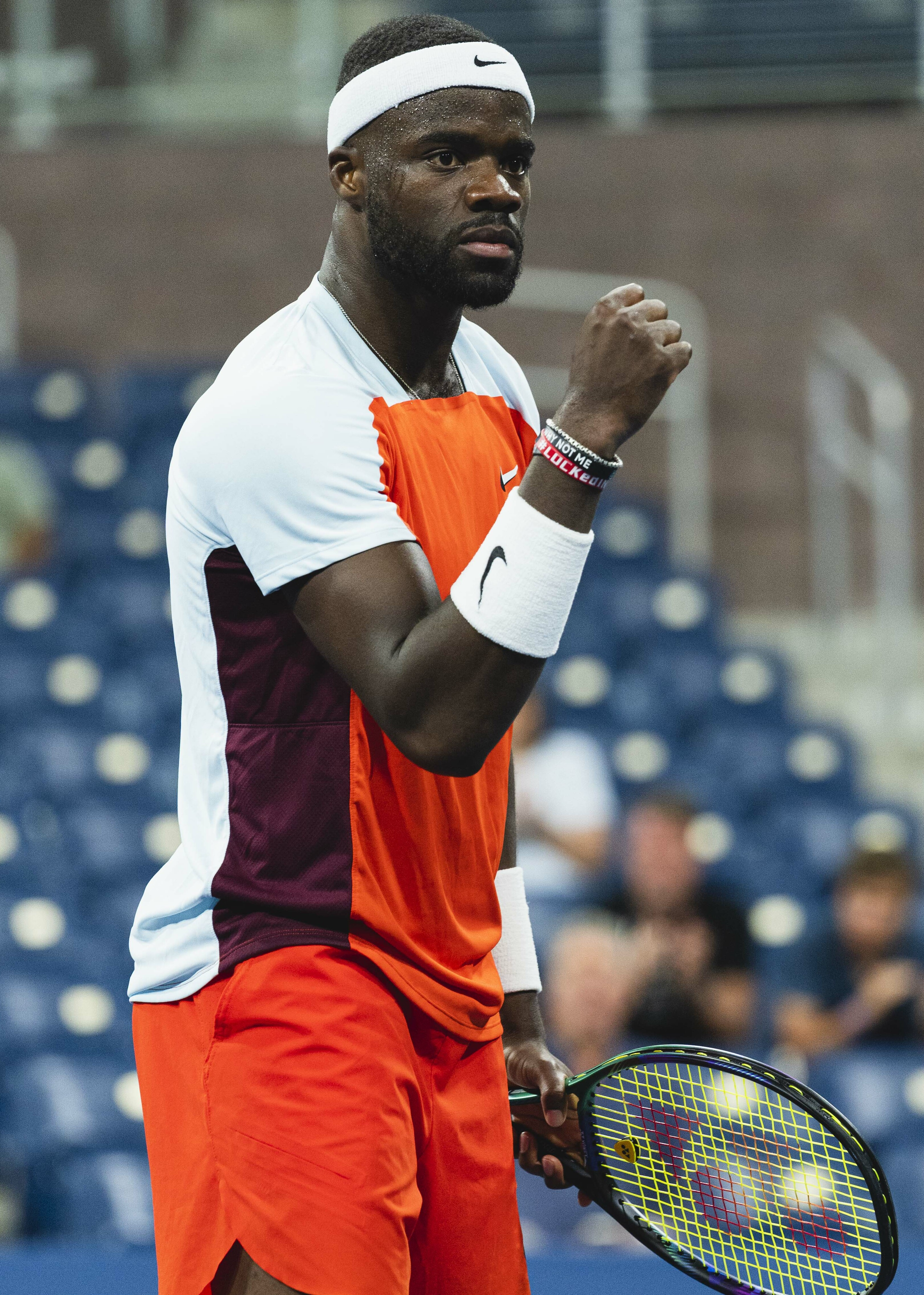
Tiafoe

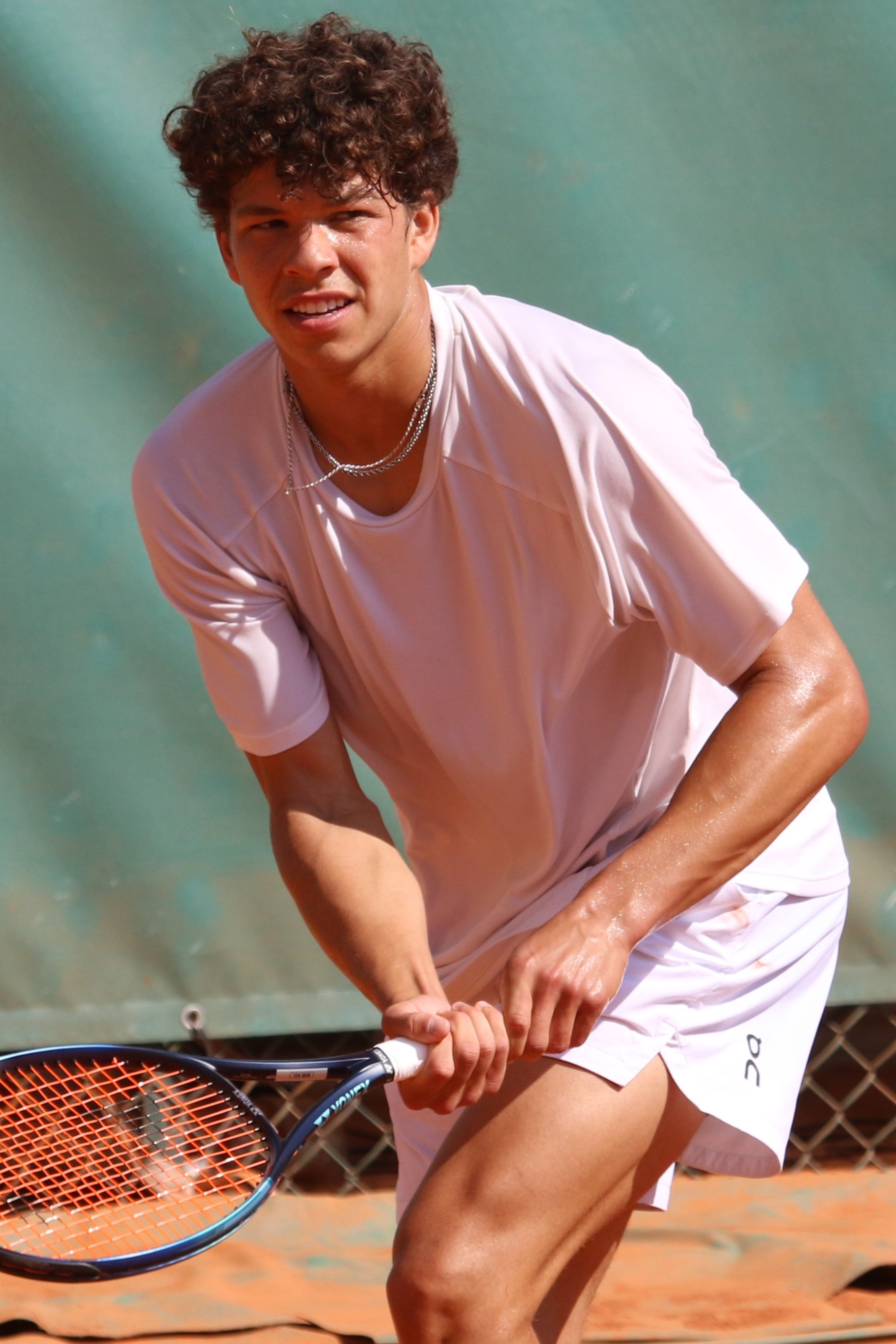
Shelton

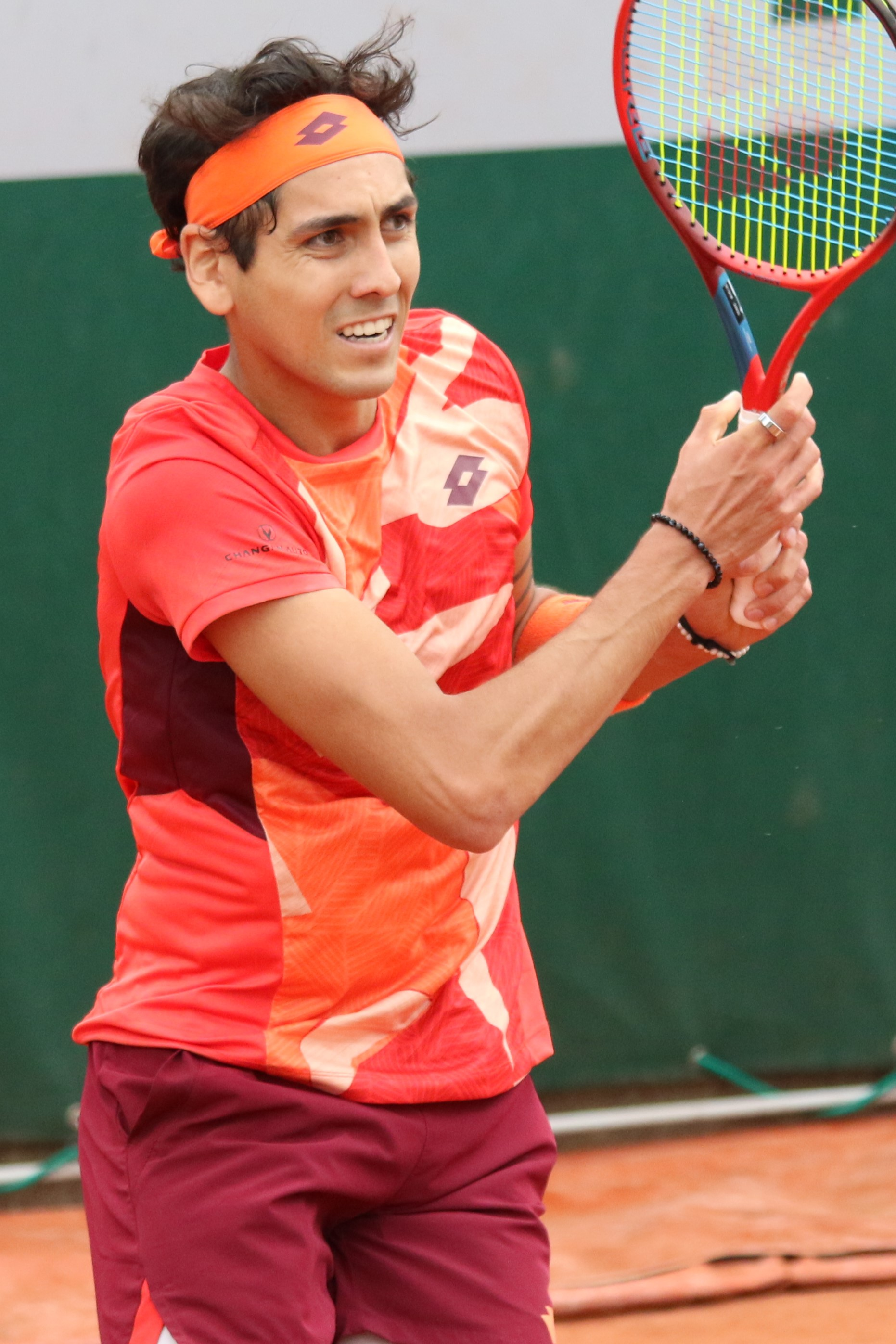
Tabilo

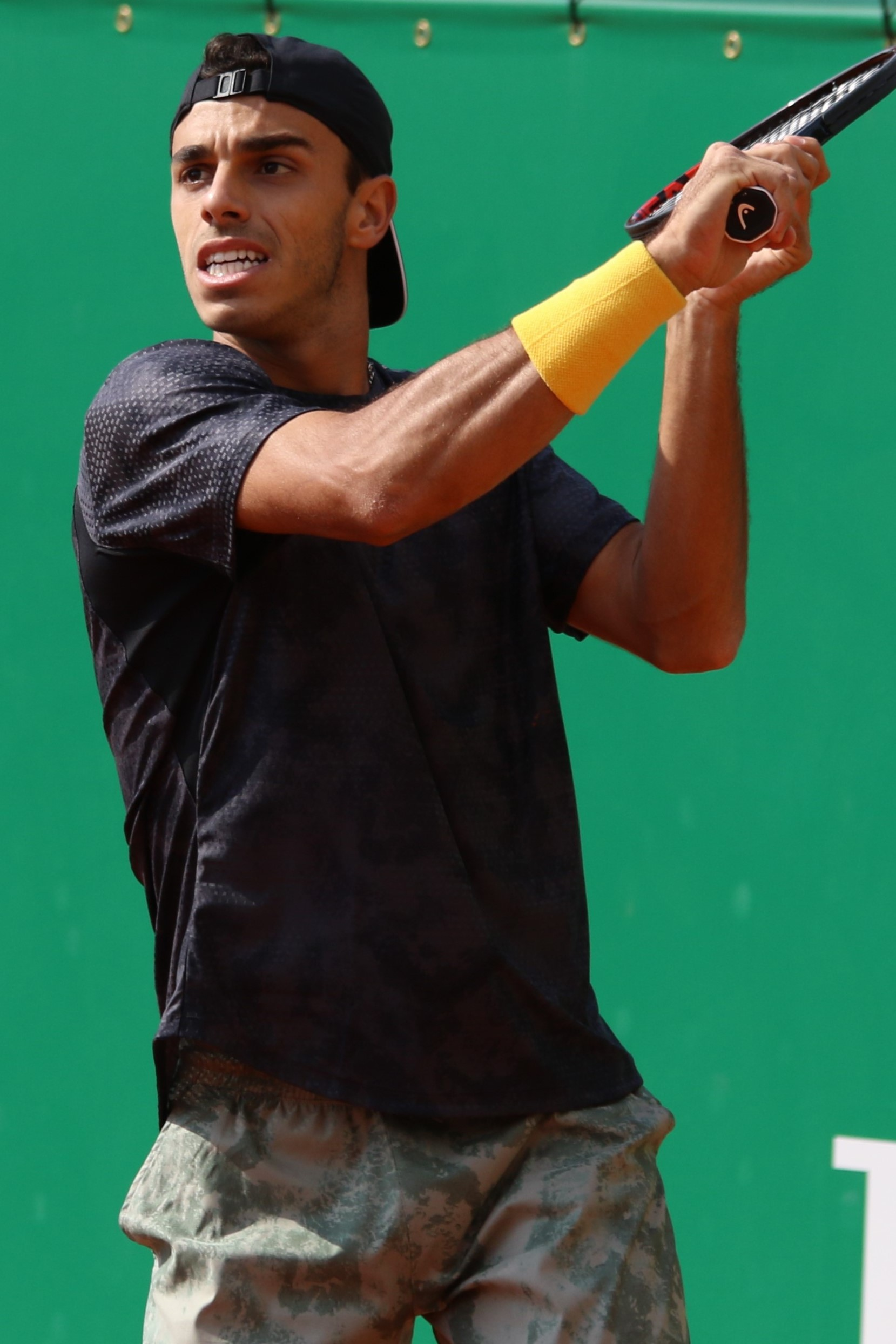
Cerúndolo

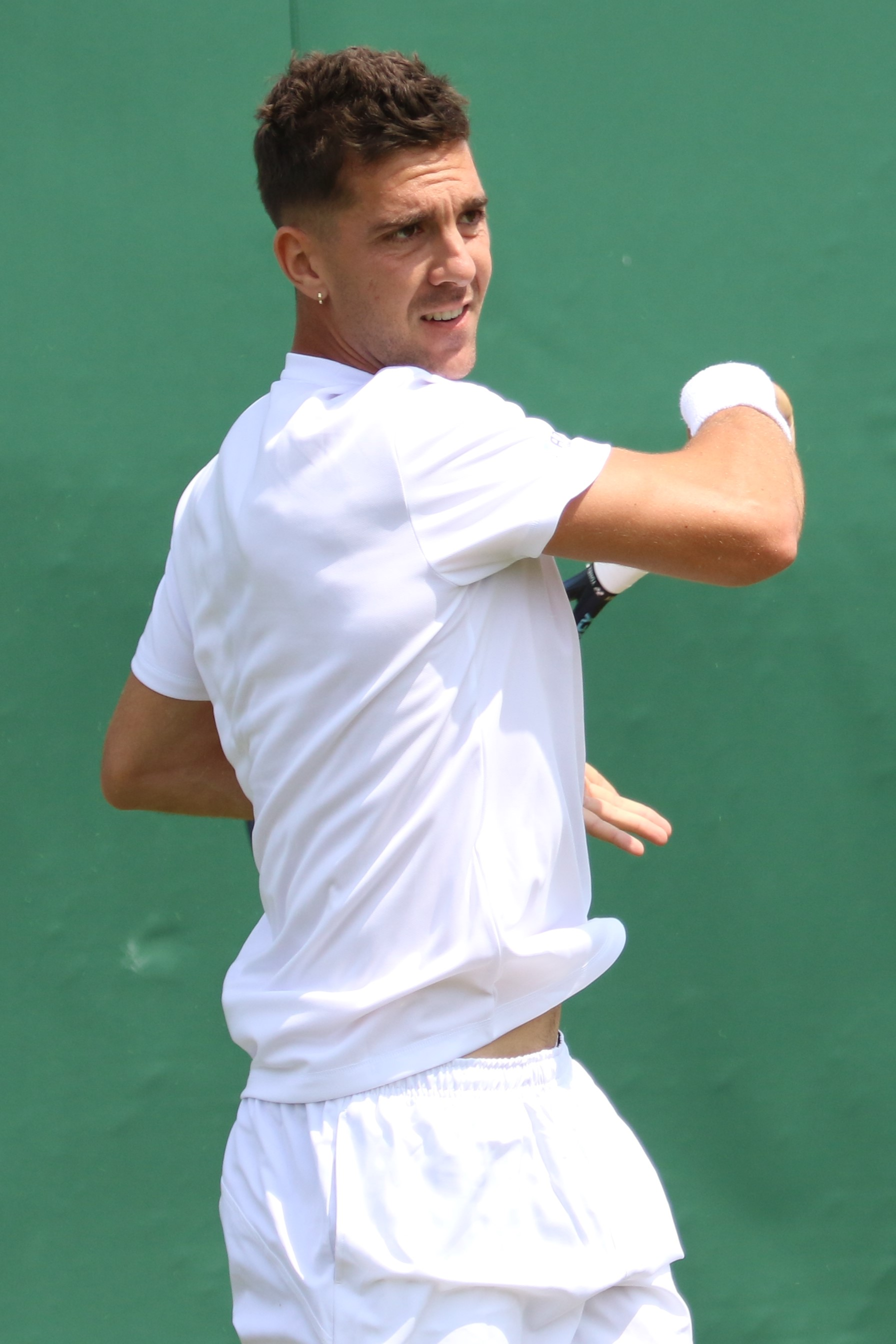
Kokkinakis

== Matches ==
Each match win on day 1 is worth one point, on day 2 two points, and on day 3 three points. The first team to 13 points will win.

Day	Date	Match type	Team Europe	Team World	Score	Team points after match
1	20 Sep	Singles	(Norway) Casper Ruud	(Argentina) Francisco Cerúndolo	4–6, 4–6	0–1
1	20 Sep	Singles	(Greece) Stefanos Tsitsipas	(Australia) Thanasi Kokkinakis	6–1, 6–4	1–1
1	20 Sep	Singles	(Bulgaria) Grigor Dimitrov	(Chile) Alejandro Tabilo	7–6^{(7–4)}, 7–6^{(7–2)}	2–1
1	20 Sep	Doubles	(Spain) C Alcaraz / (Germany) A Zverev	(United States) T Fritz / (United States) B Shelton	6–7^{(5–7)}, 4–6	2–2
2	21 Sep	Singles	Daniil Medvedev	(United States) Frances Tiafoe	6–3, 4–6, [5–10]	2–4
2	21 Sep	Singles	(Spain) Carlos Alcaraz	(United States) Ben Shelton	6–4, 6–4	4–4
2	21 Sep	Singles	(Germany) Alexander Zverev	(United States) Taylor Fritz	4–6, 5–7	4–6
2	21 Sep	Doubles	(Norway) C Ruud / (Greece) S Tsitsipas	(United States) B Shelton / (Chile) A Tabilo	1–6, 2–6	4–8
3	22 Sep	Doubles	(Spain) C Alcaraz / (Norway) C Ruud	(United States) B Shelton / (United States) F Tiafoe	6–2, 7–6^{(8–6)}	7–8
3	22 Sep	Singles	Daniil Medvedev	(United States) Ben Shelton	7–6^{(8–6)}, 5–7, [7–10]	7–11
3	22 Sep	Singles	(Germany) Alexander Zverev	(United States) Frances Tiafoe	6–7^{(5–7)}, 7–5, [10–5]	10–11
3	22 Sep	Singles	(Spain) Carlos Alcaraz	(United States) Taylor Fritz	6–2, 7–5	13–11

== Player statistics ==
Player	Team	Nat	Matches	Matches win–loss			Points win–loss		
Player	Team	Nat	Matches	Singles	Doubles	Total	Singles	Doubles	Total
Carlos Alcaraz	Europe	(Spain)	4	2–0	1–1	3–1	5–0	3–1	8–1
Francisco Cerúndolo	World	(Argentina)	1	1–0	0–0	1–0	1–0	0–0	1–0
Grigor Dimitrov	Europe	(Bulgaria)	1	1–0	0–0	1–0	1–0	0–0	1–0
Taylor Fritz	World	(United States)	3	1–1	1–0	2–1	2–3	1–0	3–3
Thanasi Kokkinakis	World	(Australia)	1	0–1	0–0	0–1	0–1	0–0	0–1
Daniil Medvedev	Europe		2	0–2	0–0	0–2	0–5	0–0	0–5
Casper Ruud	Europe	(Norway)	3	0–1	1–1	1–2	0–1	3–2	3–3
Ben Shelton	World	(United States)	5	1–1	2–1	3–2	3–2	3–3	6–5
Alejandro Tabilo	World	(Chile)	2	0–1	1–0	1–1	0–1	2–0	2–1
Frances Tiafoe	World	(United States)	3	1–1	0–1	1–2	2–3	0–3	2–6
Stefanos Tsitsipas	Europe	(Greece)	2	1–0	0–1	1–1	1–0	0–2	1–2
Alexander Zverev	Europe	(Germany)	3	1–1	0–1	1–2	3–2	0–1	3–3
