= 2016 Boodles Challenge =

- Date: 21 – 25 June 2016
- Edition: 15th
- Category: Exhibition tournament
- Surface: Grass
- Location: Stoke Poges, Buckinghamshire; United Kingdom
← 2015 ·	Boodles Challenge	· 2017 →

The 2016 Boodles Challenge was an exhibition tournament held before Wimbledon to serve as a warm-up to players. Taking place from 21 to 25 June 2016 at Stoke Park in London, it was the 15th edition of the Boodles Challenge. As with last year, no player was declared champion.

== Results ==
=== Day 1 (21 June) ===
Matches on Stoke Park
Winner	Loser	Score
(Serbia) Janko Tipsarević	(Spain) Nicolás Almagro	6–2, 7–6^{(8–6)}
(Argentina) Juan Martín del Potro	(Croatia) Borna Ćorić	6–2, 6–3
(Italy) Fabio Fognini	(United States) John Isner	0–6, 6–2, [10–5]
(Serbia) Viktor Troicki	(France) Jérémy Chardy	7–5, 6–4

=== Day 2 (22 June) ===
Matches on Stoke Park
Winner	Loser	Score
(United Kingdom) Aljaž Bedene	(Netherlands) Robin Haase	6–4, 6–4
(Belgium) David Goffin	(Serbia) Novak Djokovic	6–3, 7–5
(Serbia) Viktor Troicki	(France) Lucas Pouille	6–4, 7–5
(Serbia) Janko Tipsarević	(Argentina) Juan Mónaco	6–4, 7–5

=== Day 3 (23 June) ===
Matches on Stoke Park
Players	Score
(United States) John Isner vs (France) Jérémy Chardy	6–3, 3–2, suspended
(Australia) Nick Kyrgios vs (Argentina) Juan Mónaco	6–4, suspended
(Argentina) Juan Martín del Potro vs (France) Gilles Simon	Not played
(Croatia) Borna Ćorić vs (Italy) Fabio Fognini	Not played

Due to inclement weather, Novak Djokovic decided to withdraw from the tournament and arrived to the 2016 Wimbledon Championships. Two scheduled matches were not played, also due to rain.

=== Day 4 (24 June) ===
Matches on Stoke Park
Winner	Loser	Score
(Serbia) Viktor Troicki	(Argentina) Juan Mónaco	6–2, 6–4
(Australia) Nick Kyrgios	(Germany) Alexander Zverev	6–3, 7–6^{(15–13)}
(Bulgaria) Grigor Dimitrov	(Belgium) David Goffin	6–3, 6–7^{(4–7)}, [12–10]
(Spain) Nicolás Almagro	(Netherlands) Robin Haase	6–3, 6–7^{(5–7)}, [10–6]

=== Day 5 (25 June) ===
Matches on Stoke Park
Winner	Loser	Score
(Spain) Guillermo García López	(Greece) Stefanos Tsitsipas	6–2, 6–4
(Netherlands) Robin Haase	(United States) Taylor Fritz	6–4, 7–6^{(7–5)}
(Czech Republic) Lukáš Rosol	(United Kingdom) Aljaž Bedene	6–1, 6–3
(Serbia) Dušan Lajović	(Lithuania) Ričardas Berankis	6–3, 6–4
