= 2013 Boodles Challenge =

- Date: 18 – 22 June 2013
- Edition: 12th
- Category: Exhibition tournament
- Surface: Grass
- Location: Stoke Poges, Buckinghamshire; United Kingdom
- Boodles Challenge

The 2013 Boodles Challenge was an exhibition tennis tournament held before Wimbledon to serve as a warm-up to players. Taking place from 18 to 22 June 2013 at Stoke Park in Buckinghamshire, it was the 12th edition of the Boodles Challenge. Viktor Troicki won the title, defeating Robin Haase 7-5, 6-4 in a thrilling encounter. Novak Djokovic and Grigor Dimitrov delighted the crowd with a strip-tease during their exhibition match on the third day.

== Results ==
- Day 1 (18 June)

Winner	Defeated	Score
(Serbia) Janko Tipsarević	(Bulgaria) Grigor Dimitrov	6–7^{(5–7)}, 7–6^{(7–5)}, [10–4]
(Croatia) Marin Čilić	(Slovenia) Aljaž Bedene	7–5, 6–2
(Ukraine) Sergiy Stakhovsky	(Colombia) Santiago Giraldo	6–4, 7–6^{(7–5)}

- Day 2 (19 June)

Winner	Defeated	Score
(Czech Republic) Tomáš Berdych	(Ukraine) Alexandr Dolgopolov	4–6, 6–2, [10–8]
(United States) Sam Querrey	(France) Richard Gasquet	7–6^{(7–2)}, 7–6^{(7–5)}
(United States) John Isner	(Colombia) Santiago Giraldo	6–4, 4–6, [12–10]

- Day 3 (20 June)

Winner	Defeated	Score
(Serbia) Novak Djokovic	(Bulgaria) Grigor Dimitrov	5–7, 6–3, [10–6]
(Croatia) Marin Čilić	(Ukraine) Alexandr Dolgopolov	7–6^{(7–5)}, 7–6^{(13–11)}
(United States) James Cerretani (United Kingdom) Jamie Delgado	(Germany) Alexander Zverev (Germany) Mischa Zverev	7–5, 7–5

- Day 4 (21 June)

Winner	Defeated	Score
(France) Richard Gasquet	(Argentina) Juan Martín del Potro	6–3, 4–6, [10–5]
(Bulgaria) Grigor Dimitrov	(Poland) Jerzy Janowicz	6–1, 7–6^{(7–5)}
(Ukraine) Alexandr Dolgopolov	(United States) Sam Querrey	6–3, 6–4

- Day 5 (22 June)

Winner	Defeated	Score
(Serbia) Viktor Troicki	(Netherlands) Robin Haase	7–5, 6–4
(Argentina) Horacio Zeballos	(Netherlands) Thiemo de Bakker	6–3, 6–4
(United States) James Cerretani (United Kingdom) Jamie Delgado	(Australia) Rameez Junaid (Canada) Adil Shamasdin	10–5
