= 2019 ATP Finals =

- Date: 10–17 November
- Edition: 50th (singles) / 45th (doubles)
- Category: ATP Finals
- Draw: 8S / 8D
- Prize money: US$9,000,000
- Surface: Hard / indoor
- Location: London, United Kingdom
- Venue: The O_{2} Arena

Champions

Singles
- (Greece) Stefanos Tsitsipas

Doubles
- (France) Pierre-Hugues Herbert / (France) Nicolas Mahut
- ATP Finals

The 2019 ATP Finals (also known as the 2019 Nitto ATP Finals for Nitto sponsorship) was a men's tennis year-end tournament played at the O_{2} Arena on indoor hard courts in London, United Kingdom, from 10 to 17 November 2019. It was the season-ending event for the highest-ranked singles players and doubles teams on the 2019 ATP Tour and was the 50th edition of the tournament (45th in doubles). The singles event was won by Stefanos Tsitsipas over Dominic Thiem in three sets. In doubles, Pierre-Hugues Herbert and Nicolas Mahut defeated Raven Klaasen and Michael Venus in straight sets.

== Finals ==
=== Singles ===
(Greece) Stefanos Tsitsipas defeated (Austria) Dominic Thiem, 6–7^{(6–8)}, 6–2, 7–6^{(7–4)}

- It was Tsitsipas's 3rd title of the year and 4th of his career. It was his first win at the event.

=== Doubles ===
(France) Pierre-Hugues Herbert / (France) Nicolas Mahut defeated (South Africa) Raven Klaasen / (New Zealand) Michael Venus 6–3, 6–4

== Day-by-day summaries ==
=== Singles group ===
Group Andre Agassi	Group Björn Borg
(Spain) Rafael Nadal	(Serbia) Novak Djokovic
(Russia) Daniil Medvedev	(Switzerland) Roger Federer
(Greece) Stefanos Tsitsipas	(Austria) Dominic Thiem
(Germany) Alexander Zverev	(Italy) Matteo Berrettini

=== Doubles group ===
Group Max Mirnyi	Group Jonas Björkman
(Colombia) Cabal / (Colombia) Farah	(Poland) Kubot / (Brazil) Melo
(Germany) Krawietz / (Germany) Mies	(United States) Ram / (United Kingdom) Salisbury
(Netherlands) Rojer / (Romania) Tecău	(South Africa) Klaasen / (New Zealand) Venus
(France) Herbert / (France) Mahut	(Croatia) Dodig / (Slovakia) Polášek

Session	Match type	Group / round	Winner	Loser	Score
Day 1 (10 November)
Afternoon	Doubles	Björkman	(South Africa) Raven Klaasen / (New Zealand) Michael Venus [5]	(United States) Rajeev Ram / (United Kingdom) Joe Salisbury [4]	6–3, 6–4
Afternoon	Singles	Borg	(Serbia) Novak Djokovic [2]	(Italy) Matteo Berrettini [8]	6–2, 6–1
Evening	Doubles	Björkman	(Poland) Łukasz Kubot / (Brazil) Marcelo Melo [2]	(Croatia) Ivan Dodig / (Slovakia) Filip Polášek [8]	4–6, 6–4, [10–5]
Evening	Singles	Borg	(Austria) Dominic Thiem [5]	(Switzerland) Roger Federer [3]	7–5, 7–5
Day 2 (11 November)
Afternoon	Doubles	Mirnyi	(Germany) Kevin Krawietz / (Germany) Andreas Mies [3]	(Netherlands) Jean-Julien Rojer / (Romania) Horia Tecău [6]	7–6^{(7–3)}, 4–6, [10–6]
Afternoon	Singles	Agassi	(Greece) Stefanos Tsitsipas [6]	(Russia) Daniil Medvedev [4]	7–6^{(7–5)}, 6–4
Evening	Doubles	Mirnyi	(France) Pierre-Hugues Herbert / (France) Nicolas Mahut [7]	(Colombia) Juan Sebastián Cabal / (Colombia) Robert Farah [1]	6–3, 7–5
Evening	Singles	Agassi	(Germany) Alexander Zverev [7]	(Spain) Rafael Nadal [1]	6–2, 6–4
Day 3 (12 November)
Afternoon	Doubles	Björkman	(United States) Rajeev Ram / (United Kingdom) Joe Salisbury [4]	(Croatia) Ivan Dodig / (Slovakia) Filip Polášek [8]	3–6, 6–3, [10–6]
Afternoon	Singles	Borg	(Switzerland) Roger Federer [3]	(Italy) Matteo Berrettini [8]	7–6^{(7–2)}, 6–3
Evening	Doubles	Björkman	(South Africa) Raven Klaasen / (New Zealand) Michael Venus [5]	(Poland) Łukasz Kubot / (Brazil) Marcelo Melo [2]	6–3, 6–4
Evening	Singles	Borg	(Austria) Dominic Thiem [5]	(Serbia) Novak Djokovic [2]	6–7^{(5–7)}, 6–3, 7–6^{(7–5)}
Day 4 (13 November)
Afternoon	Doubles	Mirnyi	(Netherlands) Jean-Julien Rojer / (Romania) Horia Tecău [6]	(Colombia) Juan Sebastián Cabal / (Colombia) Robert Farah [1]	6–2, 5–7, [10–8]
Afternoon	Singles	Agassi	(Spain) Rafael Nadal [1]	(Russia) Daniil Medvedev [4]	6–7^{(3–7)}, 6–3, 7–6^{(7–4)}
Evening	Doubles	Mirnyi	(France) Pierre-Hugues Herbert / (France) Nicolas Mahut [7]	(Germany) Kevin Krawietz / (Germany) Andreas Mies [3]	7–5, 7–6^{(7–3)}
Evening	Singles	Agassi	(Greece) Stefanos Tsitsipas [6]	(Germany) Alexander Zverev [7]	6–3, 6–2
Day 5 (14 November)
Afternoon	Doubles	Björkman	(Poland) Łukasz Kubot / (Brazil) Marcelo Melo [2]	(United States) Rajeev Ram / (United Kingdom) Joe Salisbury [4]	6–7^{(5–7)}, 6–4, [10–7]
Afternoon	Singles	Borg	(Italy) Matteo Berrettini [8]	(Austria) Dominic Thiem [5]	7–6^{(7–3)}, 6–3
Evening	Doubles	Björkman	(Croatia) Ivan Dodig / (Slovakia) Filip Polášek [8]	(South Africa) Raven Klaasen / (New Zealand) Michael Venus [5]	7–6^{(7–4)}, 6–4
Evening	Singles	Borg	(Switzerland) Roger Federer [3]	(Serbia) Novak Djokovic [2]	6–4, 6–3
Day 6 (15 November)
Afternoon	Doubles	Mirnyi	(Colombia) Juan Sebastián Cabal / (Colombia) Robert Farah [1]	(Germany) Kevin Krawietz / (Germany) Andreas Mies [3]	7–6^{(9–7)}, 6–2
Afternoon	Singles	Agassi	(Spain) Rafael Nadal [1]	(Greece) Stefanos Tsitsipas [6]	6–7^{(4–7)}, 6–4, 7–5
Evening	Doubles	Mirnyi	(France) Pierre-Hugues Herbert / (France) Nicolas Mahut [7]	(Netherlands) Jean-Julien Rojer / (Romania) Horia Tecău [6]	6–3, 7–6^{(7–4)}
Evening	Singles	Agassi	(Germany) Alexander Zverev [7]	(Russia) Daniil Medvedev [4]	6–4, 7–6^{(7–4)}
Day 7 (16 November)
Afternoon	Doubles	Semifinals	(South Africa) Raven Klaasen / (New Zealand) Michael Venus [5]	(Colombia) Juan Sebastián Cabal / (Colombia) Robert Farah [1]	6–7^{(5–7)}, 7–6^{(12–10)}, [10–6]
Afternoon	Singles	Semifinals	(Greece) Stefanos Tsitsipas [6]	(Switzerland) Roger Federer [3]	6–3, 6–4
Evening	Doubles	Semifinals	(France) Pierre-Hugues Herbert / (France) Nicolas Mahut [7]	(Poland) Łukasz Kubot / (Brazil) Marcelo Melo [2]	6–3, 7–6^{(7–4)}
Evening	Singles	Semifinals	(Austria) Dominic Thiem [5]	(Germany) Alexander Zverev [7]	7–5, 6–3
Day 8 (17 November)
Afternoon	Doubles	Final	(France) Pierre-Hugues Herbert / (France) Nicolas Mahut [7]	(South Africa) Raven Klaasen / (New Zealand) Michael Venus [5]	6–3, 6–4
Afternoon	Singles	Final	(Greece) Stefanos Tsitsipas [6]	(Austria) Dominic Thiem [5]	6–7^{(6–8)}, 6–2, 7–6^{(7–4)}

== Format ==
The ATP Finals group stage had a round-robin format, with eight players/teams divided into two groups of four and each player/team in a group playing the other three in the group. The eight seeds were determined by the ATP rankings and ATP Doubles Team Rankings on the Monday after the last ATP Tour tournament of the calendar year. All singles matches, including the final, were best of three sets with tie-breaks in each set including the third. All doubles matches were two sets (no ad) and a Match Tie-break.

In deciding placement within a group, the following criteria were used, in order:

1. Most wins.
2. Most matches played (e.g., a 2–1 record beats a 2–0 record).
3. Head-to-head result between tied players/teams.
4. Highest percentage of sets won.
5. Highest percentage of games won.
6. ATP rank after the last ATP Tour tournament of the year.

Criteria 4–6 were used only in the event of a three-way tie; if one of these criteria decided a winner or loser among the three, the remaining two would have been ranked by head-to-head result.

The top two of each group advanced to semifinals, with the winner of each group playing the runner-up of the other group. The winners of the semifinals then played for the title.

== Points and prize money ==
Stage	Singles	Doubles^{1}	Points
Final win	$1,354,000	$204,000	RR + 900
Semi-final win	$657,000	$106,000	RR + 400
Round-robin win per match	$215,000	$40,000	200
Participation fee	$215,000	$103,000	—N/a
Alternates	$116,000	$40,000	—N/a

- RR is the points or prize money won in the round robin stage.
- ^{1} Prize money for doubles is per team.
- An undefeated champion would earn the maximum 1,500 points, and $2,871,000 in singles or $533,000 in doubles.

== Qualification ==
=== Singles ===
Eight players competed at the tournament, with two named alternates. Players received places in the following order of precedence:

1. First, the top 7 players in the ATP Race to London on the Monday after the final tournament of the ATP Tour, that is, after the 2019 Paris Masters.
2. Second, up to two 2019 Grand Slam tournament winners ranked anywhere 8th–20th, in ranking order
3. Third, the eighth ranked player in the ATP rankings

In the event of this totaling more than 8 players, those lower down in the selection order become the alternates. If further alternates are needed, these players are selected by the ATP.

Provisional rankings were published weekly as the ATP Race to London, coinciding with the 52-week rolling ATP rankings on the date of selection. Points were accumulated in Grand Slam, ATP Tour, ATP Challenger Tour and ITF Futures tournaments from the 52 weeks prior to the selection date, with points from the previous years Tour Finals excluded. Players accrued points across 18 tournaments, usually made up of:

- The 4 Grand Slam tournaments
- The 8 mandatory ATP Masters tournaments
- The best results from any 6 other tournaments that carry ranking points

All players must include the ranking points for mandatory Masters tournaments for which they are on the original acceptance list and for all Grand Slams for which they would be eligible, even if they do not compete (in which case they receive zero points). Furthermore, players who finished 2018 in the world's top 30 are commitment players who must (if not injured) include points for the 8 mandatory Masters tournament regardless of whether they enter, and who must compete in at least 4 ATP 500 tournaments (though the Monte Carlo Masters may count to this total), of which one must take place after the US Open. Zero point scores may also be taken from withdrawals by non-injured players from ATP 500 tournaments according to certain other conditions outlined by the ATP. Beyond these rules, however, a player may substitute his next best tournament result for missed Masters and Grand Slam tournaments.

Players may have their ATP Tour Masters 1000 commitment reduced by one tournament, by reaching each of the following milestones:

1. 600 tour level matches (as of January 1, 2019), including matches from Challengers and Futures played before year 2011;
2. 12 years of service;
3. 31 years of age (as of January 1, 2019).

If a player satisfies all three of these conditions, their mandatory ATP Tour Masters 1000 commitment is dropped entirely. Players must be in good standing as defined by the ATP as to avail of the reduced commitment.

=== Doubles ===
Eight teams compete at the tournament, with one named alternates. The eight competing teams receive places according to the same order of precedence as in Singles. The named alternate will be offered first to any unaccepted teams in the selection order, then to the highest ranked unaccepted team, and then to a team selected by the ATP. Points are accumulated in the same competitions as for the Singles tournament. However, for Doubles teams there are no commitment tournaments, so teams are ranked according to their 18 highest points scoring results from any tournaments.

== Qualified players ==
=== Singles ===
#	Players	Points	Tourn.	Date qualified
1	(Spain) Rafael Nadal	9,585	12	10 July
2	(Serbia) Novak Djokovic	8,945	14	14 July
3	(Switzerland) Roger Federer	6,190	13	27 August
4	(Russia) Daniil Medvedev	5,705	22	3 September
5	(Austria) Dominic Thiem	5,025	20	5 October
6	(Greece) Stefanos Tsitsipas	4,000	26	11 October
7	(Germany) Alexander Zverev	2,945	23	30 October
8	(Italy) Matteo Berrettini	2,670	24	1 November

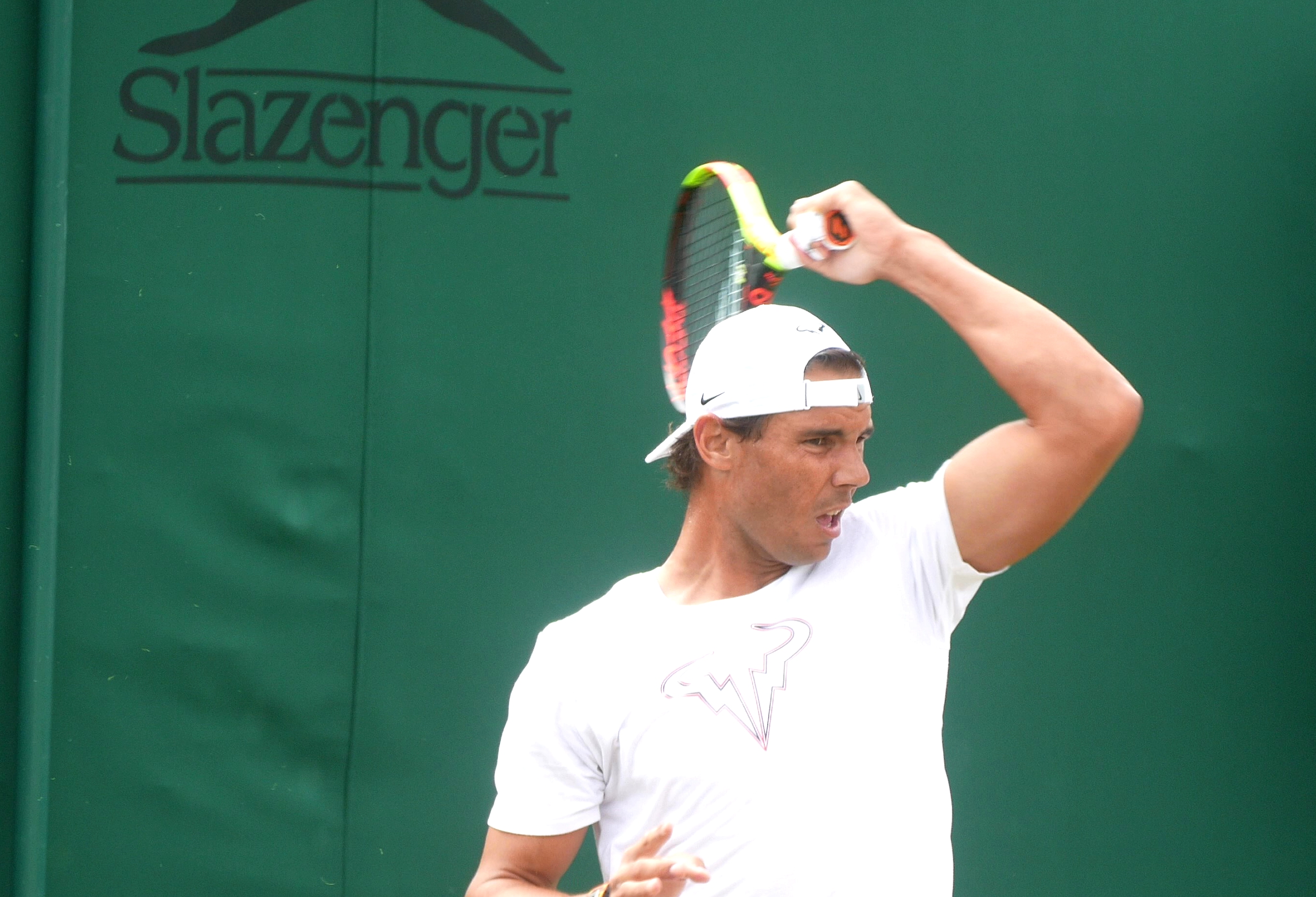
Nadal won his 19th slam at the US Open.

On 10 July, Rafael Nadal became the first qualifier to the event, qualifying for the 15th time.

Rafael Nadal began his season at the Australian Open and got through the final without dropping a set, However, he lost to Novak Djokovic in the final in straight sets. He then competed in the Mexican Open but was upset by Nick Kyrgios in the second round after losing two tiebreak sets after claiming the first set. At the Indian Wells Masters, he withdrew prior to his semifinal match against Roger Federer due to a knee injury. He began his clay court season being the 3-time defending champion at the Monte-Carlo Masters and Barcelona Open but lost to Fabio Fognini and Dominic Thiem in the semifinals, respectively. He then lost his fourth semifinal in a row at the Madrid Open, this time to Stefanos Tsitsipas. He won his first title of the year at the Italian Open defeating Novak Djokovic in the final in three sets. At the French Open, he won his 12th Roland Garros title defeating Dominic Thiem in the final in four sets.

At Wimbledon, he reached his 6th slam semifinal in a row but lost to Federer in four sets. He then claimed his third title of the year at the Rogers Cup defeating Daniil Medvedev in the final dropping only 3 games in the match. He claimed his 19th slam title at the US Open once again defeating Medvedev in the final but this time, he was pushed to a deciding set. At the Laver Cup, he won his singles match against Milos Raonic and then pulled out, citing a hand injury. Team Europe won the event. He then played at the Paris Masters and withdrew prior to the semifinal encounter against Denis Shapovalov. Despite the loss, he returned to the number 1 ranking for the first time in a year.

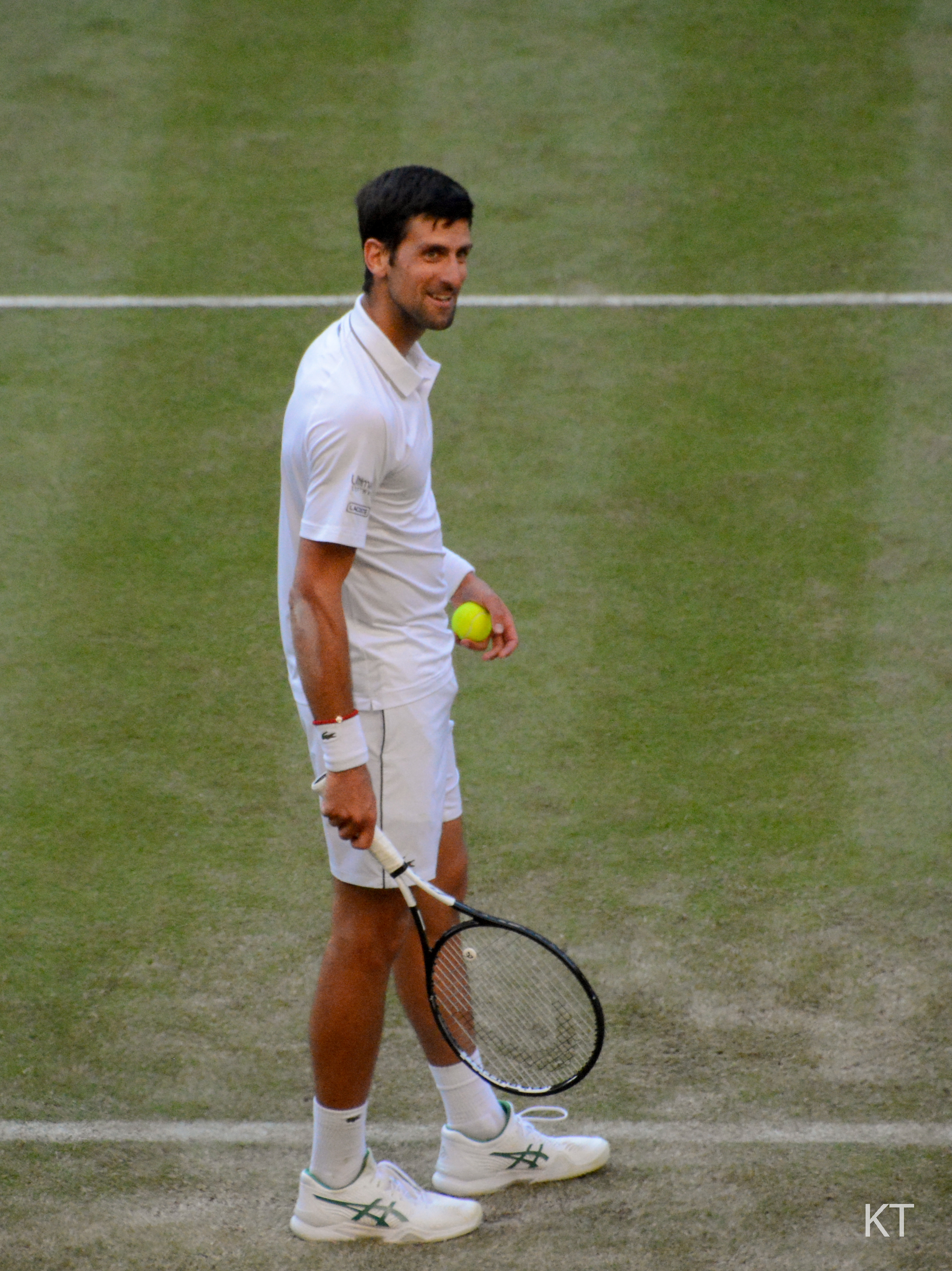
Djokovic won Wimbledon.

On 14 July, Novak Djokovic qualified for the event.

Novak Djokovic started his 2019 at the Qatar Open but lost in the semifinals losing to Roberto Bautista Agut. At the Australian Open, he won his 15th slam title defeating Rafael Nadal in the final in straight sets. At the Sunshine Double, Djokovic's results were mediocre, losing in the third round of the Indian Wells Masters to Philipp Kohlschreiber and in the fourth round of the Miami Open once again to Bautista Agut. His results continued to be mediocre at the Monte-Carlo Masters losing in the quarterfinals to Medvedev. He bounced back at the Madrid Open when he claimed the title defeating Tsitsipas in the final. He continued his good form at the Italian Open, reaching the final but losing to Nadal in three sets. At the French Open, he reached his 10th consecutive quarterfinal and he then reached the semifinal where his 26-match slam win streak and his quest for his 4th consecutive slam ended when he lost to Thiem.

At Wimbledon, he won his sixteenth Grand Slam, defending his title to win the tournament for a fifth time by defeating Federer in an epic five set final that lasted four hours and fifty seven minutes, the longest in Wimbledon history. Djokovic saved two championship points and the match also marked the first time a fifth set tiebreak was played in the men's singles of Wimbledon at 12 games all. Djokovic then played at the Cincinnati Masters as the defending champion and reached the semifinal where he lost to eventual champion Medvedev in three sets. At the US Open, Djokovic was unable to defend his title, falling to Stan Wawrinka in the fourth round, while down two sets and a break before retiring due to injury. Djokovic then won the Japan Open where he defeated John Millman in straight sets in the final. At the Shanghai Masters, Djokovic reached the quarterfinal stage, but lost to Tsitsipas in three sets. Djokovic reached the final of the Paris Masters, where he claimed his fifth title there after a straight set win over Canadian Shapovalov.

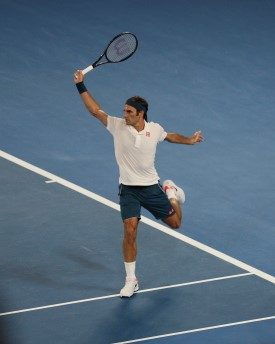
Federer won his 10th Basel title.

On 27 August, Roger Federer qualified for the event.

Roger Federer opened his campaign by retaining the Hopman Cup alongside Belinda Bencic, becoming the first player to win the mixed-gender event three times. Federer was seeded third at the Australian Open, entering as the two-time defending champion and reached the fourth round, where he faced 14th seed Stefanos Tsitsipas. In a stunning upset, Tsitsipas defeated Federer in four close sets. Critically, Federer was unable to convert any of the twelve break points he held throughout the match, including four set points in the second set. At the Dubai Tennis Championships, Federer won his 100th career singles title, beating Tsitsipas in straight sets in the final. Federer then reached the final of the Indian Wells Masters where he lost to Thiem in three sets. He then defeated John Isner at the Miami Open in straights sets to win his 4th Miami Open title and 28th Masters 1000 title. Federer then played his first clay court tournament in three years at the Madrid Masters but lost in the quarterfinals to Thiem, despite having two match points. At the Italian Open, he reached the quarterfinals but was forced to withdraw due to a right leg injury. Federer next played at the French Open for the first time in 4 years and reached the semifinals, where he lost to 11-time champion Rafael Nadal in straight sets.

Federer then began his grass court season at the Halle Open where he won his tenth title at the event, defeating David Goffin in the final in straight sets. At the Wimbledon Championships, Roger Federer reached his record 12th final at the tournament after ousting Nadal in four sets in the semifinal. Federer then faced Novak Djokovic in the final, against whom he lost in a five set thriller lasting four hours and fifty seven minutes, despite having two championship points on serve in the fifth set. The match also marked the first time a fifth set tiebreaker was played at 12 games all in the men's singles and was the longest men's singles final in Wimbledon history. At the Cincinnati Masters, he reached the third round where he lost in straight sets to Andrey Rublev. At the US Open, he was seeded third. He faced Grigor Dimitrov in the quarterfinals but lost the match in five sets. At the Laver Cup, Federer won both of his singles matches against Nick Kyrgios and John Isner. Team Europe won the event. At the Shanghai Masters, he lost in the quarterfinals to Alexander Zverev in three sets. Federer advanced to the Swiss Indoors as the two-time defending champion. He defeated Alex de Minaur in straight sets for a tenth Swiss Indoors and a 103rd overall ATP singles title.

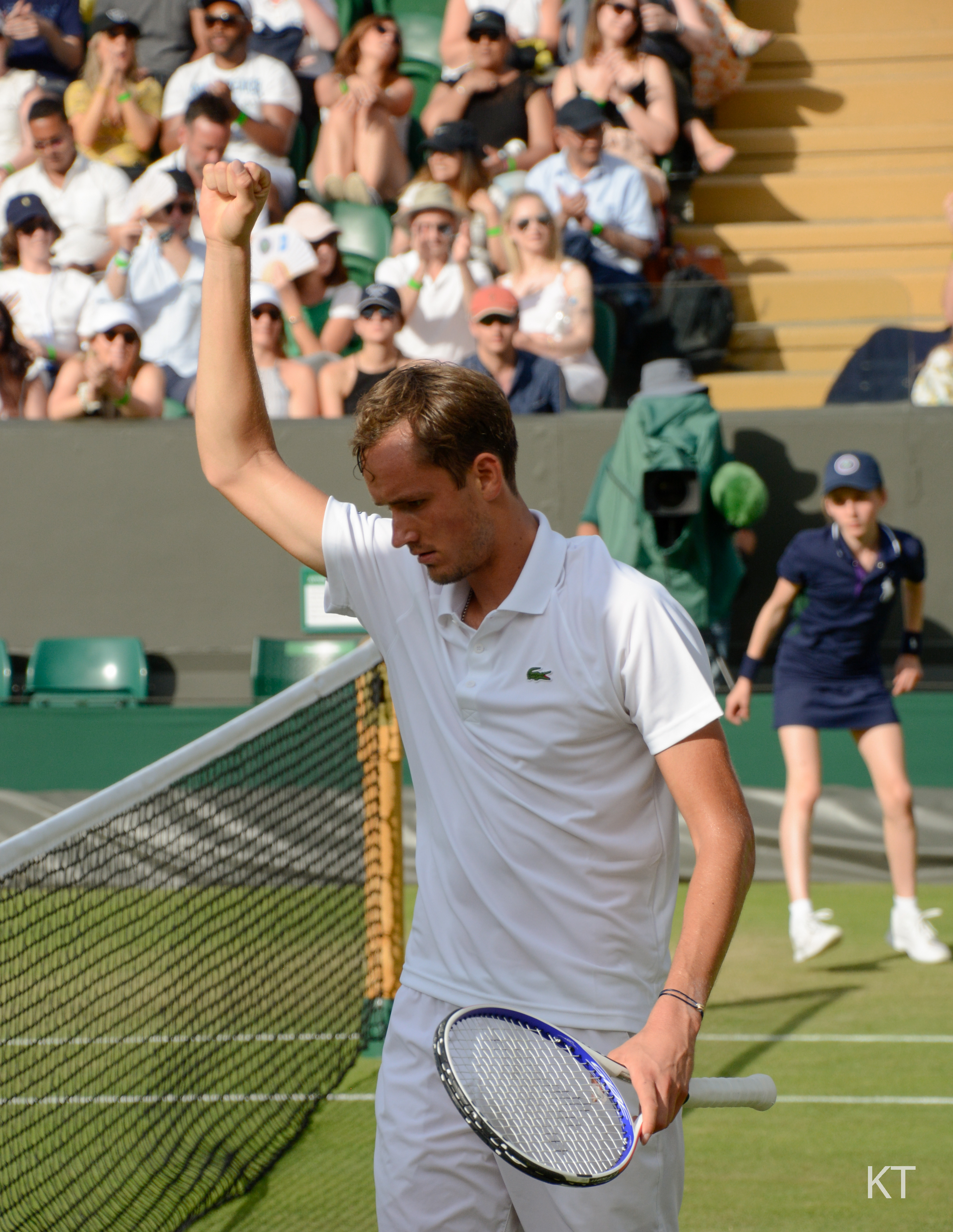
Medvedev won four titles in the year.

On 3 September, Daniil Medvedev sealed qualification to the tour finals for the first time.

Daniil Medvedev started the 2019 season strongly by reaching the final of the Brisbane International, where he lost to Kei Nishikori. At the Australian Open, he reached the fourth round for the first time, where he was defeated by eventual champion Djokovic in four sets. He then helped his country qualify for the Davis Cup Finals by defeating Henri Laaksonen. Medvedev won his fourth ATP title at the Sofia Open beating Márton Fucsovics in the final in straight sets.[19] The following week, Medvedev lost in the semifinals of the Rotterdam Open against Gaël Monfils. At the Dubai Tennis Championships, he was upset in the first round by Ričardas Berankis. At the Sunshine Double, he lost in the third round to Filip Krajinović at the Indian Wells Masters and the fourth round to Federer at the Miami Masters. Medvedev entered the Monte Carlo Masters, his run ended in the semifinals against Dušan Lajović in straight sets. At the Barcelona Open, Medvedev reached the final, where he was defeated by Thiem in straight sets. He then lost his first match in his next four tournaments: in the Madrid Open to Guido Pella, the Italian Open to Nick Kyrgios, the French Open to Pierre-Hugues Herbert and the Stuttgart Open to Lucas Pouille. He ended his streak at the Queen's Club Championships, reaching the semifinals where he lost to Gilles Simon. Medvedev made his top 10 debut after reaching the third round of Wimbledon, losing to David Goffin.

The North American hard-court swing proved to be another turning point in Medevdev's career, as he reached four tournament finals (in Washington, Montreal, Cincinnati and New York City), becoming only the third man in tennis history to do so (after Ivan Lendl and Andre Agassi). Medvedev started the swing by reaching the final of the Citi Open, where he was defeated by Kyrgios. He followed this up with a strong performance at the Rogers Cup, reaching his first Masters final, where he was defeated by Nadal. Medvedev would reach a second consecutive Masters final at the Cincinnati Open, where he defeated Goffin in straight sets for his first Masters title. Medvedev entered the US Open, where he reached his first Grand Slam final after beating former world No. 3 Grigor Dimitrov in the semifinals in straight sets. In the final, Medvedev was defeated by Nadal in five sets. Medvedev followed up his success by winning the St. Petersburg Open by defeating Borna Ćorić in the final. Medvedev then won a second consecutive title at the Shanghai Masters, defeating Alexander Zverev in final. His 6 final streak ended at the Paris Masters when he lost to Jérémy Chardy in the second round.

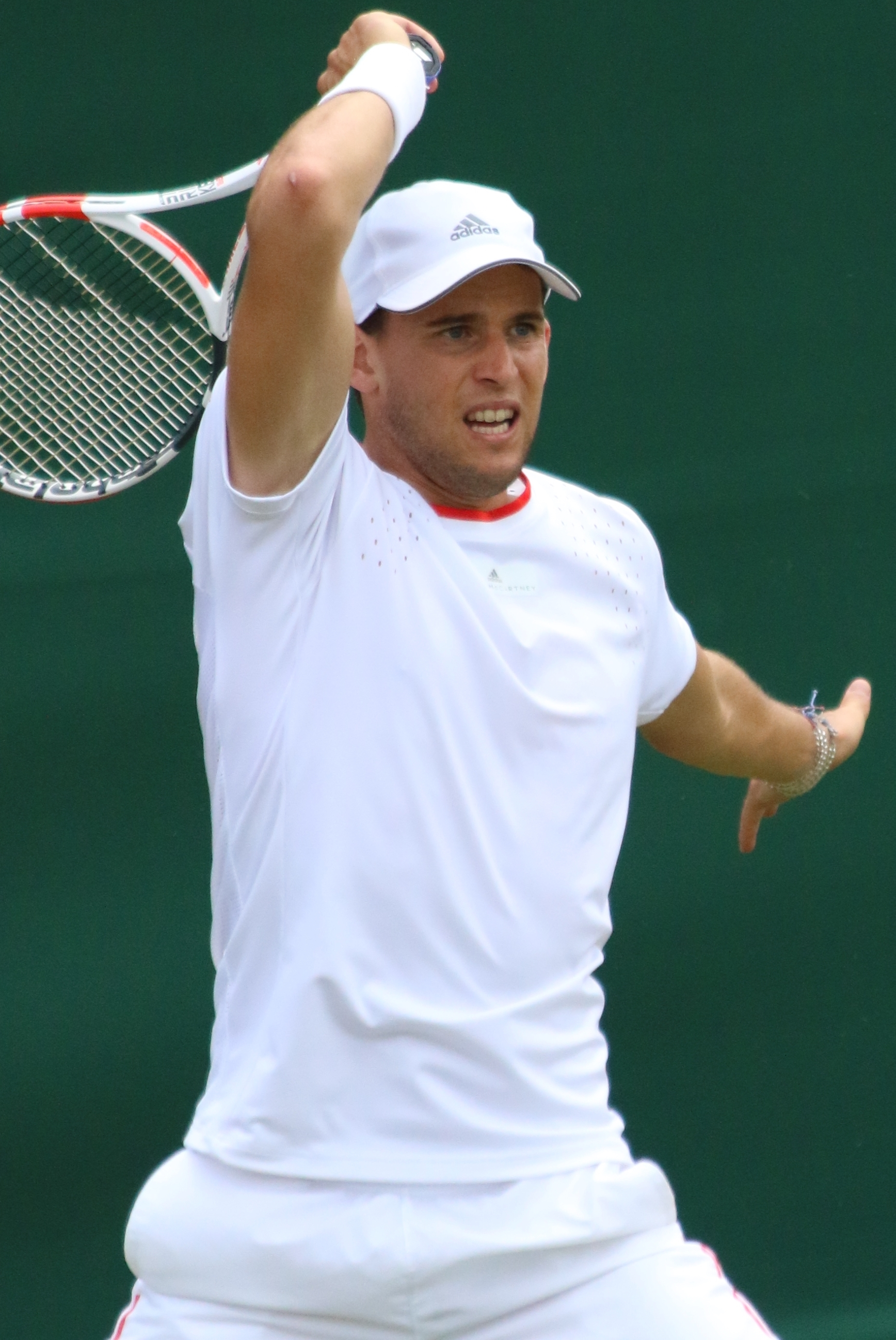
Thiem reached the final of the French Open for the 2nd time.

On 5 October, Dominic Thiem secured his place at the season finale for the fourth consecutive year.

Dominic Thiem began his season at the Qatar Open, but was upset in the first round by Pierre-Hugues Herbert. At the Australian Open, he was on the other end of a shock loss to Alexei Popyrin in the second round (by retirement). He failed to defend his title at the Argentina Open losing to Diego Schwartzman in the semifinals and was knocked out of the Rio Open by Laslo Đere in the first round. At the Indian Wells Masters, he reached the final, where he defeated Roger Federer in three sets to claim his first ATP Masters 1000 title. However, the following week he was upset by Hubert Hurkacz in the second round of the Miami Masters. After a slow start to the clay-court swing at the Rolex Monte Carlo Masters where he lost to eventual finalist Lajović in the third round, Thiem went to the Barcelona Open, where he captured his third career ATP 500 title defeating Russian Medvedev in the final. He then competed at the Madrid Open, where he reached the semifinals before losing to Djokovic. At the Italian Open, he faced Fernando Verdasco in the second round and lost, which meant he still stayed winless against the Spaniard in 4 encounters. At the French Open, he reached his fourth consecutive semifinal at the tournament. Thiem defeated Djokovic in five sets, advancing to his second major final. In the final, he again faced Nadal and lost in four sets. At the Wimbledon Championships, Thiem lost in the first round to Sam Querrey.

Thiem played at the Hamburg Open as the top seed, losing in the quarterfinals to Andrey Rublev. The following week he won the 14th title of his career at the Austrian Open defeating Albert Ramos Viñolas in straight sets in the final. At the Rogers Cup, he reached the quarterfinals before losing to Medvedev. He then competed at the US Open and was upset by Thomas Fabbiano in the first round. In the Davis Cup he won one singles rubber and lost the other as Austria won the tie against Finland 3–2. At the Laver Cup, he won against Denis Shapovalov, but lost to Taylor Fritz. Team Europe won the event. At the China Open, Thiem defeated Stefanos Tsitsipas to win his first title in Asia. At the Shanghai Masters Thiem reached the quarterfinals before being bested by Matteo Berrettini. Thiem triumphed over Schwartzman to claim the Vienna Open trophy for the first time in nine attempts. At the Paris Masters, he lost to Dimitrov in the third round.

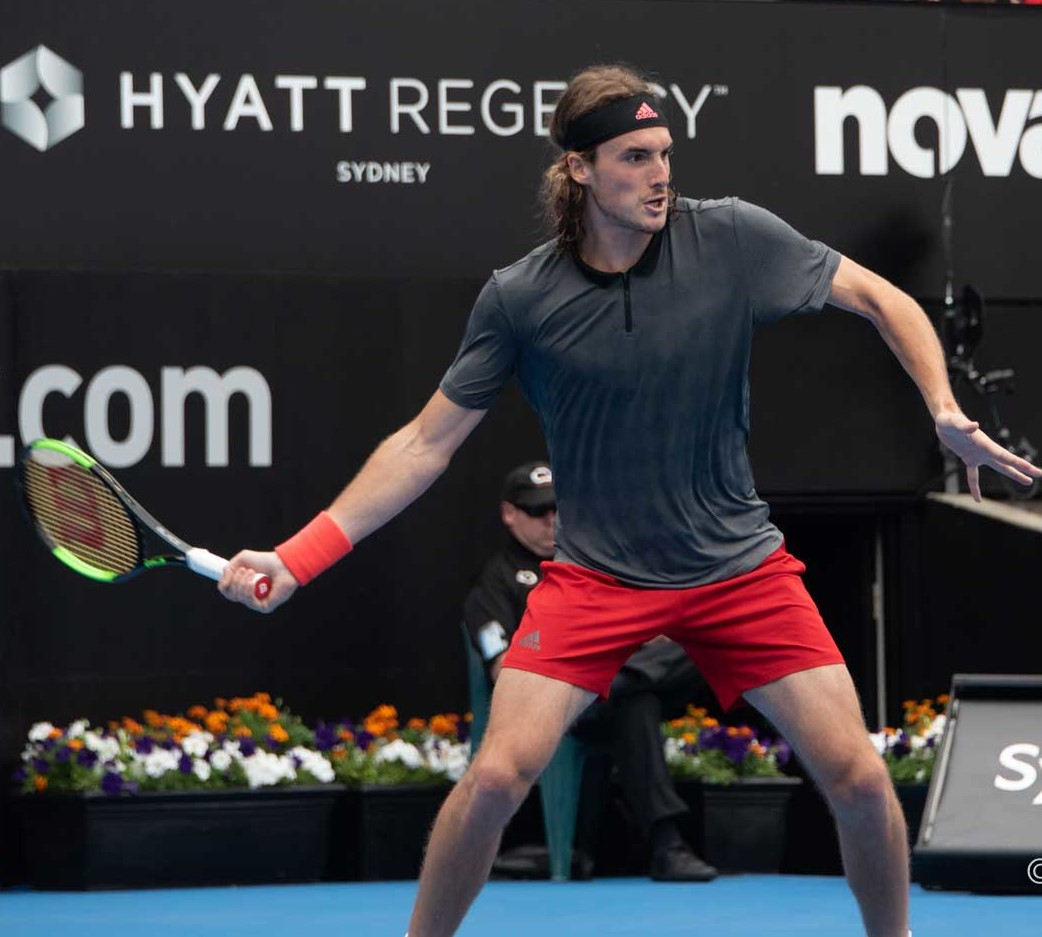
Tsitsipas reached the semifinals of a slam for the first time.

On 11 October, Stefanos Tsitsipas qualified for the first time to the Finals.

Stefanos Tsitsipas began the season at the Hopman Cup alongside Maria Sakkari, but lost during the round robin stage. At the Sydney International, he lost in the quarterfinals to Andreas Seppi. At the Australian Open, Tsitsipas reached his first major semifinal, despite only having won five Grand Slam singles matches in total the previous year, where he lost to Nadal. He then reached the quarterfinals of the Sofia Open where he lost to Monfils and was upset in the first round of the Rotterdam Open by Damir Džumhur. He then reached back-to-back finals, won his second career title at the Open 13 over Mikhail Kukushkin but lost in the final of the Dubai Tennis Championships to Federer. At the Sunshine Double, he lost early in both events to Canadians, in the second round of the Indian Wells Masters to Félix Auger-Aliassime and the fourth round of the Miami Masters to Shapovalov. He began the clay season with back-to-back 3rd round losses at the Monte Carlo Masters to Medvedev and to Jan-Lennard Struff at the Barcelona Open.

He won his first career clay court title at the Estoril Open after defeating Pablo Cuevas in the final. He reached a second successive clay court final at the Madrid Open, only to lose to Djokovic, after defeating Nadal in the semifinals. He reached the semifinals at the Italian Open, but this time he lost to Nadal in straight sets. As the 6th seed, Tsitsipas reached the fourth round at the French Open before losing to Stan Wawrinka in a 5 set thriller lasting over 5 hours. He struggled during the grass season losing in the second round of the Rosmalen Grass Court Championships to Nicolás Jarry, quarterfinals of the Queen's Club Championships to Auger-Aliassime and the first round of the Wimbledon Championships to Thomas Fabbiano. He then competed at the Citi Open, where he lost to Kyrgios in the semifinals in a third set tiebreak. However, his poor form continued with losses in his first matches at the Rogers Cup, Cincinnati Masters and US Open to Hurkacz, Struff and Rublev respectively. In the Davis Cup, he won all four of his singles matches as Greece finished second in their group and won the 3rd place play-off against Latvia. At the Laver Cup, he won his singles match against Taylor Fritz. He continued his losing streak in ATP matches at the Zhuhai Championships retiring in his second round match against Adrian Mannarino. He broke his slump at the China Open, reaching the final where he lost to Dominic Thiem in 3 sets. At the Shanghai Masters, Tsitsipas lost to Medvedev in straight sets in the semifinals. In the European indoor season, he reached the semifinals at the Swiss Indoors, losing to Federer and the quarterfinals of the Paris Masters losing to Djokovic.

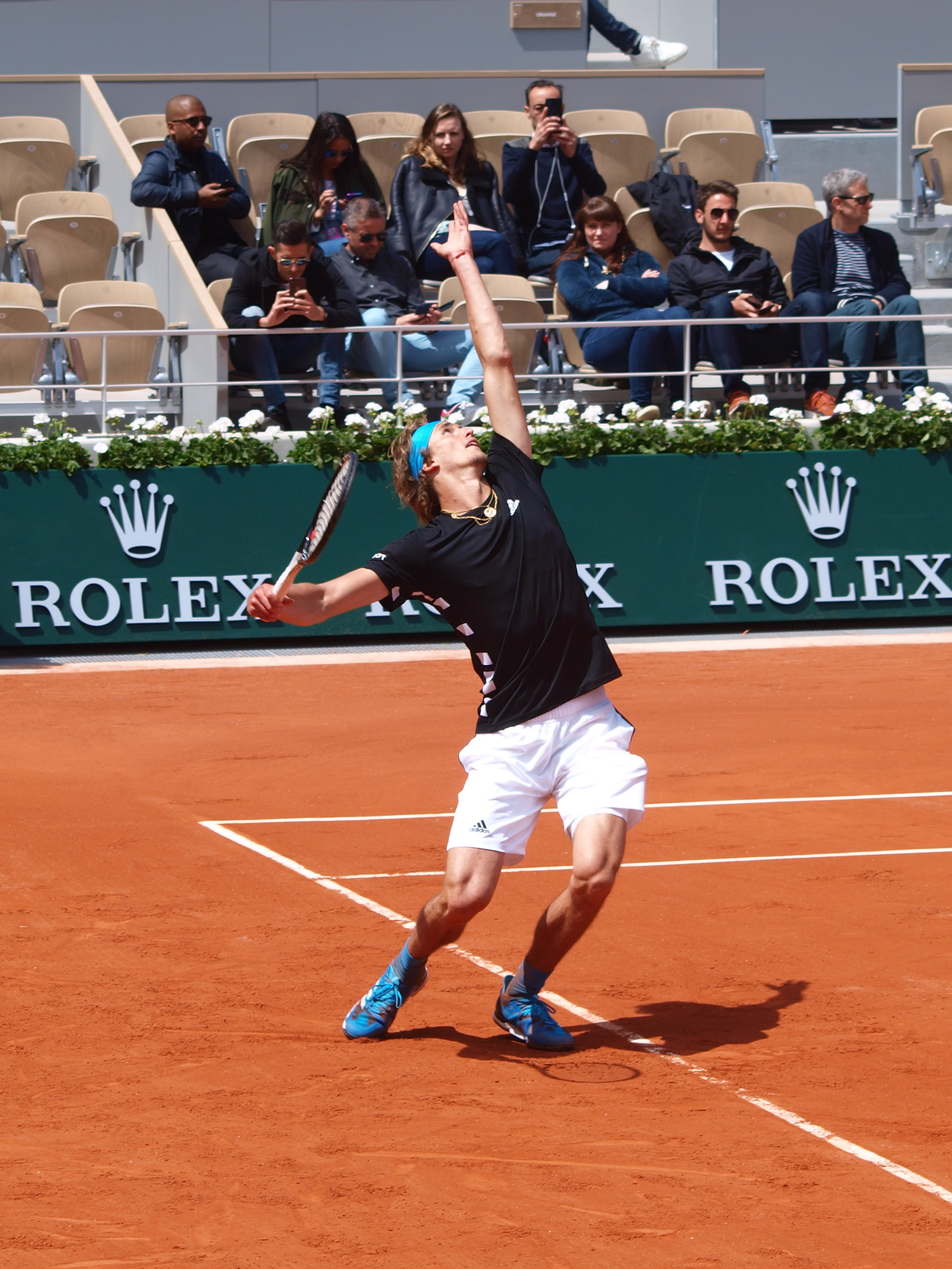
Zverev qualified for the third time for the ATP Finals

On 30 October, the defending champion Alexander Zverev qualified to the tour finals for the third consecutive year.

Alexander Zverev opened his 2019 season at the Hopman Cup, playing with Angelique Kerber. They once again reached the final and lost to Switzerland. At the Australian Open, he lost to Milos Raonic in straight sets in the fourth round. He then played in the Davis Cup qualifiers, winning both of his singles matches as Germany defeated Hungary. Zverev next played at the Mexican Open and finished runner-up to Kyrgios. He then failed to win back-to-back matches in his next six events losing in the third round of the Indian Wells Masters to Struff, the second round of the Miami Open to David Ferrer, the second round of the Grand Prix Hassan II to Jaume Munar, the third round of the Monte-Carlo Masters to Fognini, the second round of the Barcelona Open to Jarry and the quarterfinals of the BMW Open to Cristian Garín. He broke his slump by advancing to the quarterfinals of the Madrid Open, where he lost to Tsitsipas. At the Italian Open, Zverev lost to Matteo Berrettini in the second round. Zverev won his first 2019 title at the Geneva Open, defeating Nicolás Jarry in the final after saving two match points. He reached his second consecutive quarterfinal at the French Open, where he lost to Novak Djokovic in straight sets.

At the Stuttgart Open, Zverev was upset in three sets by Dustin Brown in the second round. He then reached the quarterfinals of the Halle Open, where he lost to Goffin. At the Wimbledon Championships, he was upset in the first round by Jiří Veselý. At the Hamburg European Open in his hometown, he reached the semifinals, losing to defending and eventual champion Nikoloz Basilashvili in a third set tiebreak. At the Rogers Cup, he was defeated by Karen Khachanov in the quarterfinals. Zverev then was upset by Miomir Kecmanović in the second round of the Cincinnati Masters. At the US Open, Zverev reached the fourth round and lost to 20th seeded Diego Schwartzman in four sets. At the Laver Cup, he lost to John Isner, but then defeated Milos Raonic. Team Europe won the event. At the China Open, he reached he semifinals before losing to Tsitsipas in two close sets. At the Shanghai Masters, Zverev reached his first Masters final of the season but lost the final to an in-form Daniil Medvedev in straight sets. At the Swiss Indoors, he lost in the first round to Taylor Fritz. He followed it up with a third round loss to Shapovalov at the Paris Masters.

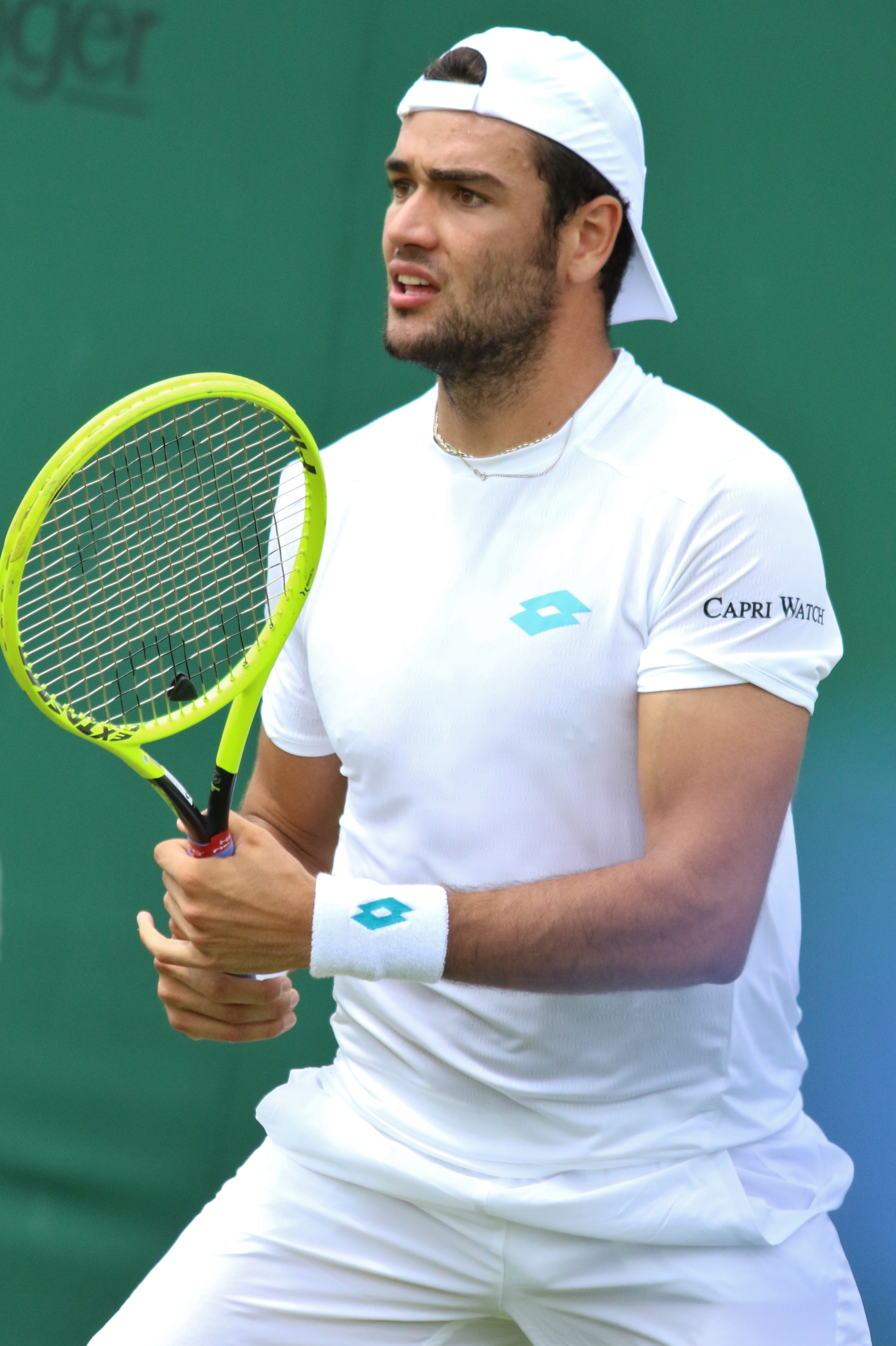
Berrettini qualified for the first time.

On 1 November, Matteo Berrettini qualified for the first time to the Finals, to complete the field.

Matteo Berrettini did not begin his year well with a first round loss at the Qatar Open to Bautista Agut. This followed with a second round loss at the Auckland Open to Leonardo Mayer and a first round loss at the Australian Open to Tsitsipas. In the Davis Cup, he beat Prajnesh Gunneswaran as Italy won the tie against India. He then reached the semifinals of the Sofia Open, where he fell to Márton Fucsovics but lost to Rublev in the second round of the Open 13. This was followed with first round losses at the Dubai Tennis Championships to Denis Kudla and at the Indian Wells Masters to Querrey. He then competed at a Challenger event, the Arizona Tennis Classic and won the title over Mikhail Kukushkin. However, his losing streak at ATP events continued with first round losses to Hurkacz at the Miami Open and to Dimitrov at the Monte Carlo Masters. At the Hungarian Open, Berrettini won his second ATP singles title, beating Filip Krajinović in the final. Berrettini continued his form into the following week as he reached the final at the BMW Open, but lost to Cristian Garín in a third set tie-breaker. At the Italian Open, Berrettini lost to Schwartzman in the third round. At the French Open, he lost in the second round to Casper Ruud.

He then claimed his third singles title at the Stuttgart Open, defeating Félix Auger-Aliassime in the final. During the tournament, Berrettini didn't lose a service game, thereby becoming only the fifth man since 1999 to win two tournaments without dropping serve. The following week, Berrettini reached his first ATP 500 semifinal at the Halle Open where he was defeated by David Goffin. At the Wimbledon Championships, Berrettini lost to Federer in the fourth round. His next event were the Cincinnati Masters but lost in the first round to Juan Ignacio Londero. At the US Open, Berrettini managed to reach his first major quarterfinal. In the quarterfinals, he beat Gaël Monfils in a fifth set tiebreak to become the first Italian man to reach the US Open semifinals since 1977. Berrettini's run ended in the semifinals against Rafael Nadal in straight sets after he was unable to capitalize on two set points in the opening set tiebreaker. At the St. Petersburg Open, he reached the quarterfinals losing to Egor Gerasimov. At the China Open, he was upset by a returning Andy Murray in the first round. He achieved his best Masters result yet at the Shanghai Masters by reaching the semifinals, losing to Zverev. He then reached the semifinals of the Vienna Open losing to Thiem. At the Paris Masters he was on the receiving end of an upset, when he lost to Jo-Wilfried Tsonga in the second round.

=== Doubles ===
#	Players	Points	Tourn.	Date qualified
1	(Colombia) Juan Sebastián Cabal (Colombia) Robert Farah	8,300	21	16 August
2	(Poland) Łukasz Kubot (Brazil) Marcelo Melo	4,645	21	11 October
3	(Germany) Kevin Krawietz (Germany) Andreas Mies	3,985	21	26 October
4	(United States) Rajeev Ram (United Kingdom) Joe Salisbury	3,670	24	28 October
5	(South Africa) Raven Klaasen (New Zealand) Michael Venus	3,640	20	24 October
6	(Netherlands) Jean-Julien Rojer (Romania) Horia Tecău	3,585	23	28 October
8	(France) Pierre-Hugues Herbert (France) Nicolas Mahut	3,360	7	26 October
9^{*}	(Croatia) Ivan Dodig (Slovakia) Filip Polášek	3,225	11	1 November
^{*} Dodig and Polášek qualified after 7th-placed Bob and Mike Bryan withdrew from the ATP Finals.

On 16 August, the Colombian pairing of Juan Sebastián Cabal and Robert Farah became the first qualifiers.

On 11 October, Łukasz Kubot and Marcelo Melo qualified for the event.

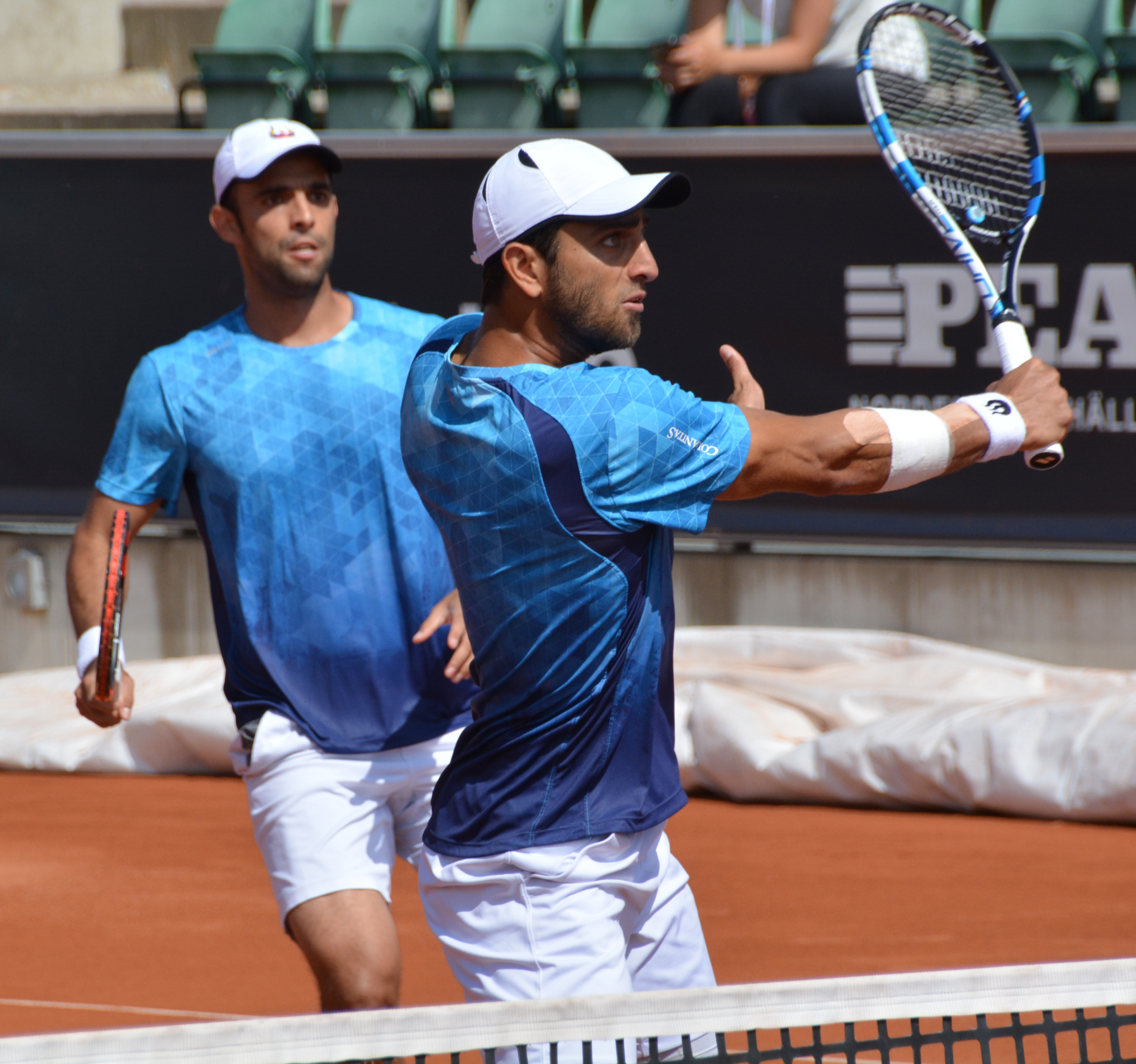
Cabal / Farah

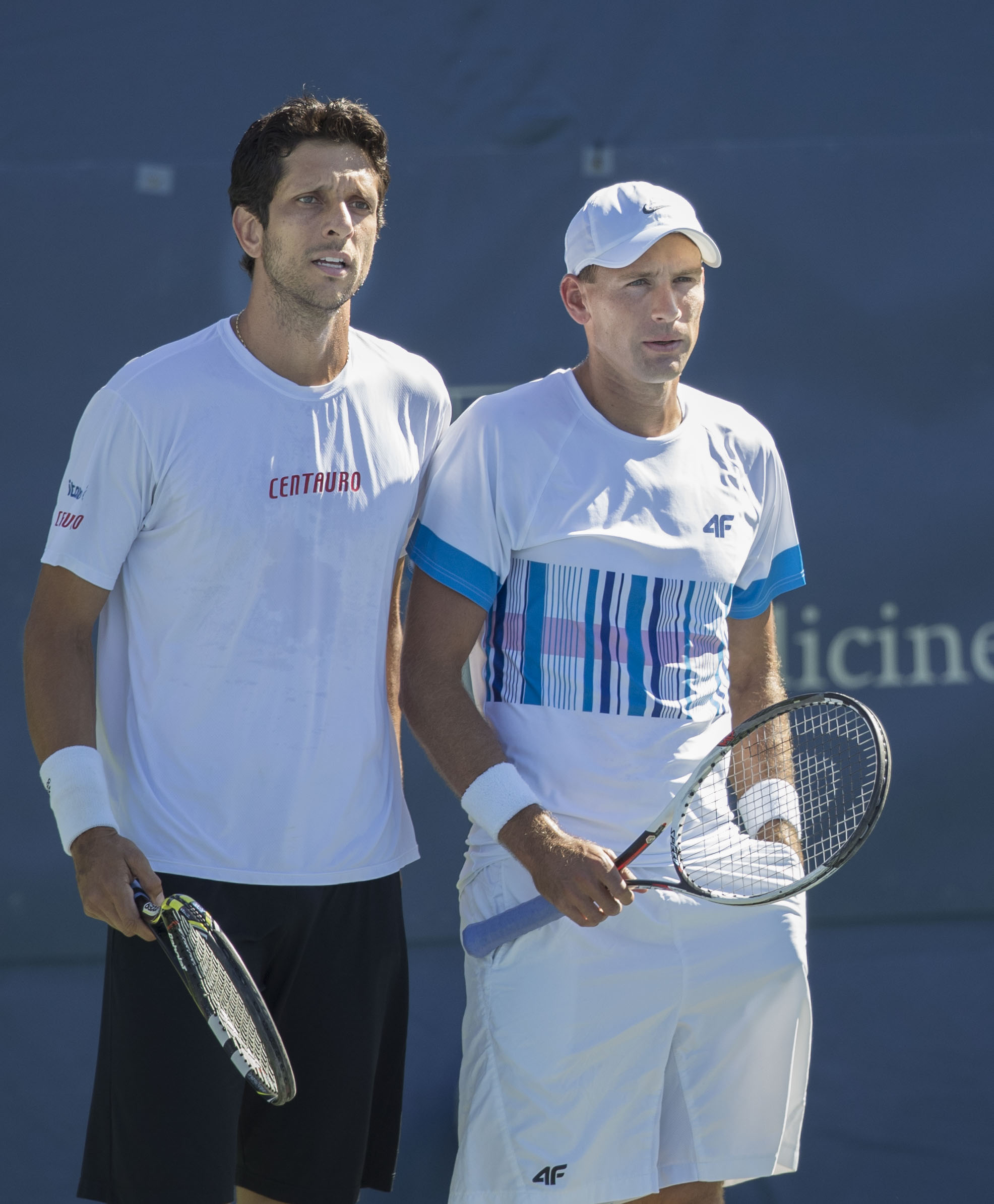
Kubot / Melo

== Points breakdown ==
- Players in gold (*) have qualified for the ATP Finals.
- Players in brown (^{x}) have withdrawn from the ATP Finals.

=== Singles ===
Seed	Player	Grand Slam				ATP Tour Masters 1000								Best Other						Total points	Tourn
Seed	Player	AUS	FRA	WIM	USO	IW	MI	MA	IT	CA	CI	SH	PA	1	2	3	4	5	6	Total points	Tourn
1*	(Spain) Rafael Nadal	F 1200	W 2000	SF; 720	W 2000	SF; 360	A 0	SF; 360	W 1000	W 1000	A 0	A 0	SF; 360	SF; 360	SF; 180	R16; 45				9,585	12
2*	(Serbia) Novak Djokovic	W 2000	SF; 720	W 2000	R16; 180	R32; 45	R16; 90	W 1000	F 600	A 0	SF; 360	QF; 180	W 1000	W 500	QF; 180	SF; 90				8,945	14
3*	(Switzerland) Roger Federer	R16; 180	SF; 720	F 1200	QF; 360	F 600	W 1000	QF; 180	QF; 180	A 0	R16; 90	QF; 180	A 0	W 500	W 500	W 500				6,190	13
4*	(Russia) Daniil Medvedev	R16; 180	R128; 10	R32; 90	F 1200	R32; 45	R16; 90	R64; 10	R64; 10	F 600	W 1000	W 1000	R32; 10	SF; 360	F 300	F 300	W 250	W 250	A 0^{†}	5,705	22
5*	(Austria) Dominic Thiem	R64; 45	F 1200	R128; 10	R128; 10	W 1000	R64; 10	SF; 360	R32; 10	QF; 180	A 0	QF; 180	R16; 90	W 500	W 500	W 500	W 250	R16; 90	QF; 90	5,025	20
6*	(Greece) Stefanos Tsitsipas	SF; 720	R16; 180	R128; 10	R128; 10	R64; 10	R16; 90	F 600	SF; 360	R32; 10	R32; 10	SF; 360	QF; 180	F 300	F 300	W 250	W 250	SF; 180	SF; 180	4,000	26
7*	(Germany) Alexander Zverev	R16; 180	QF; 360	R128; 10	R16; 180	R32; 45	R64; 10	QF; 180	R32; 10	QF; 180	R32; 10	F 600	R16; 90	F 300	W 250	SF; 180	SF; 180	R16; 90	QF; 90	2,945	23
8*	(Italy) Matteo Berrettini	R128; 10	R64; 45	R16; 180	SF; 720	R128; 10	R128; 10	SF; 90	R16; 90	A 0	R64; 10	SF; 360	R32; 10	W 250	W 250	SF; 180	SF; 180	F 150	W 125	2,670	24
Alternates
9	(Spain) Roberto Bautista Agut	QF; 360	R32; 90	SF; 720	R128; 10	R64; 10	QF; 180	R64; 10	R32; 45	QF; 180	QF; 180	R16; 90	R32; 10	W 250	QF; 90	QF; 90	SF; 90	SF; 90	R32; 45	2,540	23
10	(France) Gaël Monfils	R64; 45	R16; 180	R128; 10	QF; 360	QF; 180	R16; 20	R16; 90	R64; 10	SF; 360	R64; 10	R32; 45	QF; 180	W 500	SF; 180	SF; 180	SF; 90	QF; 45	QF; 45	2,530	21

- Ranking points in italics indicate that a player did not qualify for (or used an exemption to skip) a Grand Slam or Masters 1000 event and substituted his next best result in its place.

† Mandatory zero-point penalty for Top 30 commitment player who did not play four ATP Tour 500 events during the year, or at least one such event after the US Open.

=== Doubles ===
Rank	Player	Points																		Total points	Tourn
Rank	Player	1	2	3	4	5	6	7	8	9	10	11	12	13	14	15	16	17	18	Total points	Tourn
1*	(Colombia) Juan Sebastián Cabal (Colombia) Robert Farah	W 2000	W 2000	W 1000	SF; 720	F 600	W 500	W 250	QF; 180	QF; 180	SF; 180	F 150	R16; 90	R16; 90	R16; 90	QF; 90	QF; 90	QF; 90	R64; 0	8,300	21
2*	(Poland) Łukasz Kubot (Brazil) Marcelo Melo	F 600	F 600	QF; 360	SF; 360	SF; 360	F 300	F 300	F 300	W 250	R16; 180	R16; 180	QF; 180	QF; 180	QF; 180	SF; 180	QF; 90	QF; 45	R32; 0	4,645	21
3*	(Germany) Kevin Krawietz (Germany) Andreas Mies	W 2000	SF; 720	SF; 360	W 250	W 250	R16; 90	QF; 90	SF; 90	QF; 45	QF; 45	QF; 45	R16; 0	R64; 0	R16; 0	R32; 0	R16; 0	R16; 0	R32; 0	3,985	21
4*	(United States) Rajeev Ram (United Kingdom) Joe Salisbury	W 500	W 500	QF; 360	SF; 360	F 300	R16; 180	R16; 180	R16; 180	QF; 180	QF; 180	SF; 180	F 150	F 150	R16; 90	QF; 90	QF; 45	QF; 45	R16; 0	3,670	24
5*	(South Africa) Raven Klaasen (New Zealand) Michael Venus	SF; 720	F 600	W 500	W 500	QF; 360	QF; 180	QF; 180	QF; 180	F 150	R32; 90	QF; 90	QF; 45	QF; 45	R16; 0	R16; 0	R16; 0	R32; 0	R64; 0	3,640	20
6*	(Netherlands) Jean-Julien Rojer (Romania) Horia Tecău	W 1000	W 500	QF; 360	QF; 360	F 300	F 300	QF; 180	SF; 180	R16; 90	R16; 90	QF; 90	SF; 90	QF; 45	R64; 0	R32; 0	R32; 0	R32; 0	R64; 0	3,585	23
7^{x}	(United States) Bob Bryan (United States) Mike Bryan	W 1000	QF; 360	W 250	R16; 180	R16; 180	R16; 180	QF; 180	QF; 180	SF; 180	F 150	R16; 90	R16; 90	QF; 90	QF; 90	SF; 90	SF; 90	R16; 0	R16; 0	3,380	20
8*	(France) Pierre-Hugues Herbert (France) Nicolas Mahut	W 2000	W 1000	SF; 180	R16; 90	R16; 90	R32; 0	R64; 0												3,360	7
9*	(Croatia) Ivan Dodig (Slovakia) Filip Polášek	W 1000	SF; 720	W 500	SF; 360	QF; 180	SF; 180	F 150	SF; 90	QF; 45	R32; 0	R64; 0								3,225	11
Alternates
10	(Finland) Henri Kontinen (Australia) John Peers	F 1200	QF; 360	R16; 180	QF; 180	QF; 180	SF; 180	R32; 90	R16; 90	R16; 90	R16; 90	R16; 90	R16; 90	QF; 90	QF; 90	R16; 0	R16; 0	R32; 0	R16; 0	3,000	19
11	(France) Jérémy Chardy (France) Fabrice Martin	F 1200	W 250	W 250	R16; 180	QF; 180	QF; 180	QF; 135	R32; 90	QF; 90	QF; 45	R16; 0	R32; 0	R16; 0	R32; 0					2,600	14

== Head-to-head ==
Below are the head-to-head records as they approached the tournament.

=== Singles ===
Overall

		Nadal	Djokovic	Federer	Medvedev	Thiem	Tsitsipas	Zverev	Berrettini	Overall	YTD W–L
1	(Spain) Rafael Nadal		26–28	24–16	2–0	9–4	4–1	5–0	1–0	71–49	51–6
2	(Serbia) Novak Djokovic	28–26		26–22	3–2	6–3	2–2	3–2	0–0	68–57	53–9
3	(Switzerland) Roger Federer	16–24	22–26		3–0	2–4	2–1	3–4	1–0	49–59	51–8
4	(Russia) Daniil Medvedev	0–2	2–3	0–3		1–2	5–0	1–4	1–0	10–14	59–18
5	(Austria) Dominic Thiem	4–9	3–6	4–2	2–1		4–2	5–2	2–1	24–23	46–17
6	(Greece) Stefanos Tsitsipas	1–4	2–2	1–2	0–5	2–4		3–1	1–0	10–18	50–24
7	(Germany) Alexander Zverev	0–5	2–3	4–3	4–1	2–5	1–3		2–1	15–21	42–23
8	(Italy) Matteo Berrettini	0–1	0–0	0–1	0–1	1–2	0–1	1–2		2–8	42–21

Indoor hardcourt

		Nadal	Djokovic	Federer	Medvedev	Thiem	Tsitsipas	Zverev	Berrettini	Overall	YTD W–L
1	(Spain) Rafael Nadal		2–4	1–5	0–0	0–0	0–0	0–0	0–0	3–9	4–0
2	(Serbia) Novak Djokovic	4–2		6–4	1–0	1–0	1–0	1–1	0–0	14–7	5–0
3	(Switzerland) Roger Federer	5–1	4–6		1–0	1–0	1–0	1–1	0–0	13–8	6–0
4	(Russia) Daniil Medvedev	0–0	0–1	0–1		0–1	1–0	0–1	0–0	1–4	12–2
5	(Austria) Dominic Thiem	0–0	0–1	0–1	1–0		0–0	1–0	1–0	3–2	8–3
6	(Greece) Stefanos Tsitsipas	0–0	0–1	0–1	0–1	0–0		0–0	0–0	0–3	11–4
7	(Germany) Alexander Zverev	0–0	1–1	1–1	1–0	0–1	0–0		0–0	3–3	4–3
8	(Italy) Matteo Berrettini	0–0	0–0	0–0	0–0	0–1	0–0	0–0		0–1	7–4

=== Doubles ===
		Cabal; Farah	Kubot; Melo	Krawietz; Mies	Ram; Salisbury	Klaasen; Venus	Rojer; Tecău	Herbert; Mahut	Dodig; Polášek	Overall	YTD W–L
1	(Colombia) Juan Sebastián Cabal (Colombia) Robert Farah		5–2	0–0	0–1	2–3	4–5	1–4	0–1	12–16	49–16
2	(Poland) Łukasz Kubot (Brazil) Marcelo Melo	2–5		0–0	1–2	3–3	4–0	2–1	1–2	13–13	44–20
3	(Germany) Kevin Krawietz (Germany) Andreas Mies	0–0	0–0		1–0	0–1	0–0	0–1	0–0	1–2	28–18
4	(United States) Rajeev Ram (United Kingdom) Joe Salisbury	1–0	2–1	0–1		0–0	2–1	0–1	0–1	5–5	38–22
5	(South Africa) Raven Klaasen (New Zealand) Michael Venus	3–2	3–3	1–0	0–0		1–1	0–0	0–2	8–8	32–17
6	(Netherlands) Jean-Julien Rojer (Romania) Horia Tecău	5–4	0–4	0–0	1–2	1–1		2–1	1–1	10–13	33–21
7	(France) Pierre-Hugues Herbert (France) Nicolas Mahut	4–1	1–2	1–0	1–0	0–0	1–2		0–0	8–5	14–5
8	(Croatia) Ivan Dodig (Slovakia) Filip Polášek	1–0	2–1	0–0	1–0	2–0	1–1	0–0		7–2	26–9

== See also ==
- ATP rankings
- 2019 WTA Finals
- 2019 WTA Elite Trophy
- 2019 Next Generation ATP Finals
