= 2019 ATP Finals – Doubles =

Doubles
- 2019 ATP Finals

Final
- Champions: (France) Pierre-Hugues Herbert (France) Nicolas Mahut
- Runners-up: (South Africa) Raven Klaasen (New Zealand) Michael Venus
- Score: 6–3, 6–4

Events
Singles	Doubles
- ATP Finals

Pierre-Hugues Herbert and Nicolas Mahut defeated Raven Klaasen and Michael Venus in the final, 6–3, 6–4 to win the doubles tennis title at the 2019 ATP Finals.

Mike Bryan and Jack Sock were the reigning champions, but Sock did not qualify this year. Bryan qualified alongside his brother Bob, but they withdrew before the tournament.

== Seeds ==
1. (Colombia) Juan Sebastián Cabal / (Colombia) Robert Farah (semifinals)
2. (Poland) Łukasz Kubot / (Brazil) Marcelo Melo (semifinals)
3. (Germany) Kevin Krawietz / (Germany) Andreas Mies (round robin)
4. (United States) Rajeev Ram / (United Kingdom) Joe Salisbury (round robin)
5. (South Africa) Raven Klaasen / (New Zealand) Michael Venus (final)
6. (Netherlands) Jean-Julien Rojer / (Romania) Horia Tecău (round robin)
7. (France) Pierre-Hugues Herbert / (France) Nicolas Mahut (champions)
8. (Croatia) Ivan Dodig / (Slovakia) Filip Polášek (round robin)

== Alternates ==
1. (Finland) Henri Kontinen / (Australia) John Peers (Did not play)
2. (France) Jérémy Chardy / (France) Fabrice Martin (Did not play)

== Draw ==
Key

- Q = Qualifier
- WC = Wild card
- LL = Lucky loser
- Alt = Alternate
- ITF = ITF entry
- PR = Protected ranking
- SR = Special ranking
- SE = Special exempt
- JE = Junior exempt
- JR = Junior Accelerator Programme entrant
- CO = College Accelerator Programme entrant
- NG = Next Gen Accelerator Program entrant
- w/o = Walkover
- r = Retired
- d = Defaulted

=== Finals ===
Semifinals
7	(France) Pierre-Hugues Herbert (France) Nicolas Mahut	6	7^{7}
2	(Poland) Łukasz Kubot (Brazil) Marcelo Melo	3	6^{4}
5	(South Africa) Raven Klaasen (New Zealand) Michael Venus	6^{5}	7^{12}	[10]
1	(Colombia) Juan Sebastián Cabal (Colombia) Robert Farah	7^{7}	6^{10}	[6]

Final
7	(France) Pierre-Hugues Herbert (France) Nicolas Mahut	6	6
5	(South Africa) Raven Klaasen (New Zealand) Michael Venus	3	4

=== Group Max Mirnyi ===
		(Colombia) Cabal (Colombia) Farah	(Germany) Krawietz (Germany) Mies	(Netherlands) Rojer (Romania) Tecău	(France) Herbert (France) Mahut	RR W–L	Set W–L	Game W–L	Standings
1	(Colombia) Juan Sebastián Cabal (Colombia) Robert Farah		7–6^{(9–7)}, 6–2	2–6, 7–5, [8–10]	3–6, 5–7	1–2	3–4 (43%)	30–33 (48%)	2
3	(Germany) Kevin Krawietz (Germany) Andreas Mies	6–7^{(7–9)}, 2–6		7–6^{(7–3)}, 4–6, [10–6]	5–7, 6–7^{(3–7)}	1–2	2–5 (29%)	31–39 (44%)	4
6	(Netherlands) Jean-Julien Rojer (Romania) Horia Tecău	6–2, 5–7, [10–8]	6–7^{(3–7)}, 6–4, [6–10]		3–6, 6–7^{(4–7)}	1–2	3–5 (38%)	33–34 (49%)	3
7	(France) Pierre-Hugues Herbert (France) Nicolas Mahut	6–3, 7–5	7–5, 7–6^{(7–3)}	6–3, 7–6^{(7–4)}		3–0	6–0 (100%)	40–28 (59%)	1

=== Group Jonas Björkman ===
		(Poland) Kubot (Brazil) Melo	(United States) Ram (United Kingdom) Salisbury	(South Africa) Klaasen (New Zealand) Venus	(Croatia) Dodig (Slovakia) Polášek	RR W–L	Set W–L	Game W–L	Standings
2	(Poland) Łukasz Kubot (Brazil) Marcelo Melo		6–7^{(5–7)}, 6−4, [10–7]	3–6, 4–6	4–6, 6–4, [10–5]	2–1	4–4 (50%)	31–33 (48%)	2
4	(United States) Rajeev Ram (United Kingdom) Joe Salisbury	7–6^{(7–5)}, 4–6, [7–10]		3–6, 4–6	3–6, 6–3, [10–6]	1–2	3–5 (38%)	28–34 (45%)	3
5	(South Africa) Raven Klaasen (New Zealand) Michael Venus	6–3, 6–4	6–3, 6–4		6–7^{(4–7)}, 4–6	2–1	4–2 (67%)	34–27 (56%)	1
8	(Croatia) Ivan Dodig (Slovakia) Filip Polášek	6–4, 4–6, [5–10]	6–3, 3–6, [6–10]	7–6^{(7–4)}, 6–4		1–2	4–4 (50%)	32–31 (51%)	4

Standings are determined by: 1. number of wins; 2. number of matches; 3. in two-players-ties, head-to-head results; 4. in three-players-ties, percentage of sets won, then head-to-head result (if two players tied in percentage of sets won and third one is "different") or percentage of games won if all three players have same percentage of sets won, then head-to-head results; 5. ATP rankings.
