= 2019 Citi Open – Women's doubles =

Women's doubles
- 2019 Citi Open

Final
- Champions: (United States) Cori Gauff (United States) Caty McNally
- Runners-up: (United States) Maria Sanchez (Hungary) Fanny Stollár
- Score: 6–2, 6–2

Details
- Draw: 16
- Seeds: 4

Events
| Singles | men | women |
| Doubles | men | women |
- Citi Open

Han Xinyun and Darija Jurak were the defending doubles champions but both players chose not to participate.

The unseeded team of Cori Gauff and Caty McNally, who competed in the main draw on a wildcard, won the title, defeating Maria Sanchez and Fanny Stollár in the final, 6–2, 6–2.

== Seeds ==
1. (Russia) Anna Blinkova / (Czech Republic) Kateřina Siniaková (first round)
2. (China) Wang Yafan / (China) Yang Zhaoxuan (semifinals)
3. (Russia) Anna Kalinskaya / (Japan) Miyu Kato (semifinals)
4. (United States) Maria Sanchez / (Hungary) Fanny Stollár (final)

== Draw ==
Key

- Q = Qualifier
- WC = Wild card
- LL = Lucky loser
- Alt = Alternate
- ITF = ITF entry
- PR = Protected ranking
- SR = Special ranking
- SE = Special exempt
- JE = Junior exempt
- JR = Junior Accelerator Programme entrant
- CO = College Accelerator Programme entrant
- NG = Next Gen Accelerator Program entrant
- w/o = Walkover
- r = Retired
- d = Defaulted

=== Draw ===
First round
1 | (Russia) A Blinkova (Czech Republic) K Siniaková | 6 | 2 | [8]
(Chinese Taipei) Y-c Hsieh (China) X You | 2 | 6 | [10]
Alt | (Kazakhstan) Z Diyas (China) L Zhu | 3 | 2
WC | (United States) C Gauff (United States) C McNally | 6 | 6
3 | (Russia) A Kalinskaya (Japan) M Kato | 6 | 6
(Canada) E Bouchard (United States) S Kenin | 0 | 2
(United Kingdom) N Broady (Canada) S Fichman | 6^{5} | 6 | [10]
(Indonesia) B Gumulya (Indonesia) J Rompies | 7^{7} | 1 | [5]
WC | (United States) C Morra (United States) A Smith | 5 | 6 | [1]
(United States) A Kiick (United States) S Vickery | 7 | 2 | [10]
(United States) Q Gleason (United States) I Neel | 6 | 4 | [13]
4 | (United States) M Sanchez (Hungary) F Stollár | 4 | 6 | [15]
(United States) J Pegula (United States) S Rogers | 6 | 5 | [10]
(Romania) E Bogdan (Netherlands) R van der Hoek | 2 | 7 | [7]
(Australia) A Bai (France) E Lechemia | 0 | 3
2 | (China) Y Wang (China) Z Yang | 6 | 6

Quarterfinals
(Chinese Taipei) Y-c Hsieh (China) X You | 0 | 3
WC | (United States) C Gauff (United States) C McNally | 6 | 6
3 | (Russia) A Kalinskaya (Japan) M Kato | 6 | 3 | [10]
(United Kingdom) N Broady (Canada) S Fichman | 4 | 6 | [4]
(United States) A Kiick (United States) S Vickery
4 | (United States) M Sanchez (Hungary) F Stollár | w/o
(United States) J Pegula (United States) S Rogers | 2 | 2
2 | (China) Y Wang (China) Z Yang | 6 | 6

Semifinals
WC | (United States) C Gauff (United States) C McNally | 6 | 6
3 | (Russia) A Kalinskaya (Japan) M Kato | 1 | 2
4 | (United States) M Sanchez (Hungary) F Stollár | 6 | 6
2 | (China) Y Wang (China) Z Yang | 3 | 3

Final
WC | (United States) C Gauff (United States) C McNally | 6 | 6
4 | (United States) M Sanchez (Hungary) F Stollár | 2 | 2
