= 2019 ATP Finals – Singles =

Singles
- 2019 ATP Finals

Final
- Champion: (Greece) Stefanos Tsitsipas
- Runner-up: (Austria) Dominic Thiem
- Score: 6–7^{(6–8)}, 6–2, 7–6^{(7–4)}

Events
Singles	Doubles
- ATP Finals

Stefanos Tsitsipas defeated Dominic Thiem in the final, 6–7^{(6–8)}, 6–2, 7–6^{(7–4)} to win the singles tennis title at the 2019 ATP Finals. Tsitsipas was making his tournament debut. It marked the first instance since 2005, and only the fourth instance overall, that the Tour Finals champion was determined via a final-set tiebreak.

Alexander Zverev was the defending champion, but was defeated by Thiem in the semifinals.

Alongside Tsitsipas, Daniil Medvedev and Matteo Berrettini made their tournament debuts.

This marked the final Tour Finals appearance for six-time champion Roger Federer; age 38, he lost in the semifinals to Tsitsipas.

Rafael Nadal secured the year-end No. 1 ranking for the fifth time after Novak Djokovic was eliminated in the round-robin stage.

== Seeds ==
1. (Spain) Rafael Nadal (round robin)
2. (Serbia) Novak Djokovic (round robin)
3. (Switzerland) Roger Federer (semifinals)
4. (Russia) Daniil Medvedev (round robin)
5. (Austria) Dominic Thiem (final)
6. (Greece) Stefanos Tsitsipas (champion)
7. (Germany) Alexander Zverev (semifinals)
8. (Italy) Matteo Berrettini (round robin)

== Alternates ==
1. (Spain) Roberto Bautista Agut (Did not play)
2. (France) Gaël Monfils (Did not play)

== Draw ==
=== Finals ===
Semifinals
6	(Greece) Stefanos Tsitsipas	6	6
3	(Switzerland) Roger Federer	3	4
5	(Austria) Dominic Thiem	7	6
7	(Germany) Alexander Zverev	5	3

Final
6	(Greece) Stefanos Tsitsipas	6^{6}	6	7^{7}
5	(Austria) Dominic Thiem	7^{8}	2	6^{4}

=== Group Andre Agassi ===
		(Spain) Nadal	(Russia) Medvedev	(Greece) Tsitsipas	(Germany) Zverev	RR W–L	Set W–L	Game W–L	Standings
1	(Spain) Rafael Nadal		6–7^{(3–7)}, 6–3, 7–6^{(7–4)}	6–7^{(4–7)}, 6–4, 7−5	2–6, 4–6	2–1	4–4 (50%)	44–44 (50%)	3
4	(Russia) Daniil Medvedev	7–6^{(7–3)}, 3–6, 6–7^{(4–7)}		6–7^{(5–7)}, 4–6	4–6, 6–7^{(4–7)}	0–3	1–6 (14%)	36–45 (44%)	4
6	(Greece) Stefanos Tsitsipas	7–6^{(7–4)}, 4–6, 5−7	7–6^{(7–5)}, 6–4		6–3, 6–2	2–1	5–2 (71%)	41–34 (55%)	1
7	(Germany) Alexander Zverev	6–2, 6–4	6–4, 7–6^{(7–4)}	3–6, 2–6		2–1	4–2 (67%)	30–28 (52%)	2

=== Group Björn Borg ===
		(Serbia) Djokovic	(Switzerland) Federer	(Austria) Thiem	(Italy) Berrettini	RR W–L	Set W–L	Game W–L	Standings
2	(Serbia) Novak Djokovic		4–6, 3–6	7–6^{(7–5)}, 3–6, 6–7^{(5–7)}	6–2, 6–1	1–2	3–4 (43%)	35–34 (51%)	3
3	(Switzerland) Roger Federer	6–4, 6–3		5–7, 5–7	7–6^{(7–2)}, 6–3	2–1	4–2 (67%)	35–30 (54%)	2
5	(Austria) Dominic Thiem	6–7^{(5–7)}, 6–3, 7–6^{(7–5)}	7–5, 7–5		6–7^{(3–7)}, 3–6	2–1	4–3 (57%)	42–39 (52%)	1
8	(Italy) Matteo Berrettini	2–6, 1–6	6–7^{(2–7)}, 3–6	7–6^{(7–3)}, 6–3		1–2	2–4 (33%)	25–34 (42%)	4

Standings are determined by: 1. number of wins; 2. number of matches; 3. in two-players-ties, head-to-head results; 4. in three-players-ties, percentage of sets won, then head-to-head result (if two players tied in percentage of sets won and third one is "different") or percentage of games won if all three players have same percentage of sets won, then head-to-head results; 5. ATP rankings.
