= 2019 Citi Open – Women's singles =

Women's singles
- 2019 Citi Open

Final
- Champion: (United States) Jessica Pegula
- Runner-up: (Italy) Camila Giorgi
- Score: 6–2, 6–2

Details
- Draw: 32
- Seeds: 8

Events
Singles	men	women
Doubles	men	women
- Citi Open

Jessica Pegula defeated Camila Giorgi in the final, 6–2, 6–2 to win the women's singles tennis title at the 2019 Washington DC Open. It was her first WTA Tour title.

Svetlana Kuznetsova was the reigning champion, but was unable to compete due to visa issues.

== Seeds ==
1. (United States) Sloane Stephens (first round)
2. (United States) Madison Keys (first round)
3. (United States) Sofia Kenin (second round)
4. (Chinese Taipei) Hsieh Su-wei (quarterfinals)
5. (Ukraine) Lesia Tsurenko (second round)
6. (Czech Republic) Kateřina Siniaková (first round)
7. (Russia) Anastasia Pavlyuchenkova (first round)
8. (Puerto Rico) Monica Puig (second round)

== Draw ==
Key

- Q = Qualifier
- WC = Wild card
- LL = Lucky loser
- Alt = Alternate
- ITF = ITF entry
- PR = Protected ranking
- SR = Special ranking
- SE = Special exempt
- JE = Junior exempt
- JR = Junior Accelerator Programme entrant
- CO = College Accelerator Programme entrant
- NG = Next Gen Accelerator Program entrant
- w/o = Walkover
- r = Retired
- d = Defaulted

=== Finals ===
Semifinals
(Italy) Camila Giorgi	7^{7}	6
WC	(United States) Caty McNally	6^{5}	2
(United States) Jessica Pegula	6	3	6
Q	(Russia) Anna Kalinskaya	3	6	1

Final
(Italy) Camila Giorgi	2	2
(United States) Jessica Pegula	6	6

=== Top half ===
First round
1	(United States) S Stephens	2	5
(Sweden) R Peterson	6	7
Q	(United States) S Vickery	2	5
(Italy) C Giorgi	6	7
(Kazakhstan) Z Diyas	6	6
Q	(United States) C Gauff	4	2
(China) Y Wang	3	2
5	(Ukraine) L Tsurenko	6	6
4	(Chinese Taipei) S-w Hsieh	6	6
(Belgium) K Flipkens	4	3
(Russia) A Blinkova	2	7	2
Q	(Russia) V Gracheva	6	5	6
(China) L Zhu	4	2
WC	(United States) C McNally	6	6
(United States) C McHale	6	4	7
7	(Russia) A Pavlyuchenkova	2	6	5

Second round
(Sweden) R Peterson	6	3	4
(Italy) C Giorgi	3	6	6
(Kazakhstan) Z Diyas	6	6
5	(Ukraine) L Tsurenko	4	4
4	(Chinese Taipei) S-w Hsieh	7	4	7^{8}
Q	(Russia) V Gracheva	5	6	6^{6}
WC	(United States) C McNally	6	1	6
(United States) C McHale	3	6	3

Quarterfinals
(Italy) C Giorgi	6	6
(Kazakhstan) Z Diyas	3	2
4	(Chinese Taipei) S-w Hsieh	4	3
WC	(United States) C McNally	6	6

Semifinals
(Italy) C Giorgi	7^{7}	6
WC	(United States) C McNally	6^{5}	2

=== Bottom half ===
First round
6	(Czech Republic) K Siniaková	4	3
(United States) J Pegula	6	6
(Tunisia) O Jabeur	6	4	4
(Poland) I Świątek	4	6	6
(Canada) E Bouchard	1	2
(United States) L Davis	6	6
(United States) J Brady	2	4
3	(United States) S Kenin	6	6
8	(Puerto Rico) M Puig	6	6
WC	(United States) A Kiick	4	2
Q	(Russia) A Kalinskaya	6	6
(Japan) N Hibino	1	1
(France) K Mladenovic	6	6
PR	(United States) S Rogers	4	4
WC	(United States) H Baptiste	7^{7}	6
2	(United States) M Keys	6^{4}	2

Second round
(United States) J Pegula	5	6	6
(Poland) I Świątek	7	4	1
(United States) L Davis	5	6	6
3	(United States) S Kenin	7	3	4
8	(Puerto Rico) M Puig	6	6^{5}	4
Q	(Russia) A Kalinskaya	2	7^{7}	6
(France) K Mladenovic	6	4	6
WC	(United States) H Baptiste	4	6	3

Quarterfinals
(United States) J Pegula	6	7^{7}
(United States) L Davis	2	6^{2}
Q	(Russia) A Kalinskaya	6	4	6
(France) K Mladenovic	4	6	2

Semifinals
(United States) J Pegula	6	3	6
Q	(Russia) A Kalinskaya	3	6	1

== Qualifying ==
=== Seeds ===
1. (United States) Cori Gauff (qualified)
2. (United States) Sachia Vickery (qualified)
3. (United States) Francesca Di Lorenzo (qualifying competition)
4. (Russia) Anna Kalinskaya (qualified)
5. (Australia) Destanee Aiava (qualifying competition)
6. (Russia) Varvara Gracheva (qualified)
7. (Hungary) Fanny Stollár (qualifying competition)
8. (Japan) Hiroko Kuwata (qualifying competition)

=== Qualifiers ===
1. (United States) Cori Gauff
2. (United States) Sachia Vickery
3. (Russia) Varvara Gracheva
4. (Russia) Anna Kalinskaya

=== Draw ===
==== First qualifier ====
First round
1	(United States) Cori Gauff	6	6
(United States) Maegan Manasse	4	2
Alt	(United States) Maria Sanchez	6	5	0
8	(Japan) Hiroko Kuwata	4	7	6

Qualifying competition
1	(United States) Cori Gauff	6	6
8	(Japan) Hiroko Kuwata	1	2

==== Second qualifier ====
First round
2	(United States) Sachia Vickery	6	6
(United Kingdom) Naomi Broady	0	0
WC	(United States) Robin Montgomery	6	5	2
5	(Australia) Destanee Aiava	4	7	6

Qualifying competition
2	(United States) Sachia Vickery	6^{6}	7	6
5	(Australia) Destanee Aiava	7^{8}	5	3

==== Third qualifier ====
First round
3	(United States) Francesca Di Lorenzo	6	6
(United States) Victoria Duval	4	3
WC	(United States) Cameron Morra	3	1
6	(Russia) Varvara Gracheva	6	6

Qualifying competition
3	(United States) Francesca Di Lorenzo	6^{6}	4
6	(Russia) Varvara Gracheva	7^{8}	6

==== Fourth qualifier ====
First round
4	(Russia) Anna Kalinskaya	7^{7}	6
(Russia) Nika Kukcharchuk	6^{5}	1
(China) You Xiaodi	6	3	5
7	(Hungary) Fanny Stollár	2	6	7

Qualifying competition
4	(Russia) Anna Kalinskaya	7^{7}	6
7	(Hungary) Fanny Stollár	6^{3}	3
