= 2019 Halle Open – Singles =

Singles
- 2019 Halle Open

Final
- Champion: (Switzerland) Roger Federer
- Runner-up: (Belgium) David Goffin
- Score: 7–6^{(7–2)}, 6–1

Details
- Draw: 32 (4 Q / 3 WC )
- Seeds: 8

Events
Singles	Doubles
- Halle Open

Borna Ćorić was the defending champion, but retired from his quarterfinal match against Pierre-Hugues Herbert.

Roger Federer won the title, defeating David Goffin in the final, 7–6^{(7–2)}, 6–1. It was Federer's record-extending tenth (and final) singles title singles title in Halle, sixteen years after his first win in 2003. It was also the last of his record 19 grass court titles before his retirement in 2022.

== Seeds ==
1. (Switzerland) Roger Federer (champion)
2. (Germany) Alexander Zverev (quarterfinals)
3. (Russia) Karen Khachanov (quarterfinals)
4. (Croatia) Borna Ćorić (quarterfinals, retired)
5. (France) Gaël Monfils (first round)
6. (Georgia (country)) Nikoloz Basilashvili (first round)
7. (Spain) Roberto Bautista Agut (quarterfinals)
8. (Argentina) Guido Pella (first round)

== Draw ==
Key

- Q = Qualifier
- WC = Wild card
- LL = Lucky loser
- Alt = Alternate
- ITF = ITF entry
- PR = Protected ranking
- SR = Special ranking
- SE = Special exempt
- JE = Junior exempt
- JR = Junior Accelerator Programme entrant
- CO = College Accelerator Programme entrant
- NG = Next Gen Accelerator Program entrant
- w/o = Walkover
- r = Retired
- d = Defaulted

=== Finals ===
Semifinals
1	(Switzerland) Roger Federer	6	6
(France) Pierre-Hugues Herbert	3	3
(Italy) Matteo Berrettini	6^{4}	3
(Belgium) David Goffin	7^{7}	6

Finals
1	(Switzerland) Roger Federer	7^{7}	6
(Belgium) David Goffin	6^{2}	1

=== Top half ===
First round
1	(Switzerland) R Federer	7^{7}	6
(Australia) J Millman	6^{1}	3
WC	(France) J-W Tsonga	6	7
(France) B Paire	4	5
WC	(Germany) P Gojowczyk	3	4
(France) R Gasquet	6	6
(United States) T Fritz	6^{10}	0
7	(Spain) R Bautista Agut	7^{12}	6
4	(Croatia) B Ćorić	7^{7}	6
(Spain) J Munar	6^{2}	3
Q	(Portugal) J Sousa	7^{7}	6
(Poland) H Hurkacz	6^{3}	1
WC	(Germany) R Molleker	6	6^{6}	2
Q	(Ukraine) S Stakhovsky	3	7^{8}	6
(France) P-H Herbert	7^{8}	6
5	(France) G Monfils	6^{6}	4

Second round
1	(Switzerland) R Federer	7^{7}	4	7
WC	(France) J-W Tsonga	6^{5}	6	5
(France) R Gasquet	1	4
7	(Spain) R Bautista Agut	6	6
4	(Croatia) B Ćorić	7^{7}	5	7^{7}
Q	(Portugal) J Sousa	6^{4}	7	6^{4}
Q	(Ukraine) S Stakhovsky	6	6^{2}	4
(France) P-H Herbert	2	7^{7}	6

Quarterfinals
1	(Switzerland) R Federer	6	4	6
7	(Spain) R Bautista Agut	3	6	4
4	(Croatia) B Ćorić	5	0^{r}
(France) P-H Herbert	7	0

Semifinals
1	(Switzerland) R Federer	6	6
(France) P-H Herbert	3	3

=== Bottom half ===
First round
6	(Georgia (country)) N Basilashvili	4	4
(Italy) M Berrettini	6	6
Q	(Italy) A Seppi	6	7^{7}
Q	(Germany) M Moraing	4	6^{4}
(Germany) J-L Struff	6	6
(Serbia) L Đere	4	4
LL	(Serbia) M Kecmanović	6^{5}	4
3	(Russia) K Khachanov	7^{7}	6
8	(Argentina) G Pella	1	1
(Belgium) D Goffin	6	6
(Australia) M Ebden	7	1	4
(Moldova) R Albot	5	6	6
(United States) S Johnson	6	6
(Germany) P Kohlschreiber	3	3
(Netherlands) R Haase	4	5
2	(Germany) A Zverev	6	7

Second round
(Italy) M Berrettini	4	6	6
Q	(Italy) A Seppi	6	3	2
(Germany) J-L Struff	3	6	4
3	(Russia) K Khachanov	6	3	6
(Belgium) D Goffin	4	6	6
(Moldova) R Albot	6	4	3
(United States) S Johnson	3	5
2	(Germany) A Zverev	6	7

Quarterfinals
(Italy) M Berrettini	6	7^{7}
3	(Russia) K Khachanov	2	6^{4}
(Belgium) D Goffin	3	6	7^{7}
2	(Germany) A Zverev	6	1	6^{3}

Semifinals
(Italy) M Berrettini	6^{4}	3
(Belgium) D Goffin	7^{7}	6

== Qualifying ==
=== Seeds ===
1. (Portugal) João Sousa (qualified)
2. (Italy) Andreas Seppi (qualified)
3. (Italy) Lorenzo Sonego (first round)
4. (Russia) Andrey Rublev (first round)
5. (Serbia) Miomir Kecmanović (qualifying competition, lucky loser)
6. (United States) Denis Kudla (qualifying competition)
7. (South Africa) Lloyd Harris (first round)
8. (Latvia) Ernests Gulbis (first round)

=== Qualifiers ===
1. (Portugal) João Sousa
2. (Italy) Andreas Seppi
3. (Ukraine) Sergiy Stakhovsky
4. (Germany) Mats Moraing

=== Lucky loser ===
1. (Serbia) Miomir Kecmanović

=== Qualifying draw ===
==== First qualifier ====
First round
1	(Portugal) João Sousa	6^{6}	6	6
WC	(Italy) Jannik Sinner	7^{8}	3	4
WC	(Germany) Louis Wessels	4	2
5	(Serbia) Miomir Kecmanović	6	6

Qualifying competition
1	(Portugal) João Sousa	6^{8}	6	6
5	(Serbia) Miomir Kecmanović	7^{10}	4	1

==== Second qualifier ====
First round
2	(Italy) Andreas Seppi	6	7
(Canada) Brayden Schnur	4	5
(Germany) Mischa Zverev	6	5	6
7	(South Africa) Lloyd Harris	3	7	4

Qualifying competition
2	(Italy) Andreas Seppi	6	6
(Germany) Mischa Zverev	3	2

==== Third qualifier ====
First round
3	(Italy) Lorenzo Sonego	4	2
Alt	(Germany) Matthias Bachinger	6	6
(Ukraine) Sergiy Stakhovsky	7^{7}	6
8	(Latvia) Ernests Gulbis	6^{5}	2

Qualifying competition
Alt	(Germany) Matthias Bachinger	4	7^{7}	2
(Ukraine) Sergiy Stakhovsky	6	6^{2}	6

==== Fourth qualifier ====
First round
4	(Russia) Andrey Rublev	3	7	6^{5}
WC	(Germany) Mats Moraing	6	5	7^{7}
(Italy) Thomas Fabbiano	6	0	4
6	(United States) Denis Kudla	4	6	6

Qualifying competition
WC	(Germany) Mats Moraing	7	6
6	(United States) Denis Kudla	5	1
