= 2019 Dubai Tennis Championships – Men's doubles =

Men's doubles
- 2019 Dubai Tennis Championships

Final
- Champions: (United States) Rajeev Ram (United Kingdom) Joe Salisbury
- Runners-up: (Japan) Ben McLachlan (Germany) Jan-Lennard Struff
- Score: 7–6^{(7–4)}, 6–3

Details
- Draw: 16
- Seeds: 4

Events
Singles	men	women
Doubles	men	women
← 2018 ·	Dubai Tennis Championships	· 2020 →

Jean-Julien Rojer and Horia Tecău were the defending champions, but lost in the semifinals to Rajeev Ram and Joe Salisbury.

Ram and Salisbury went on to win the title, defeating Ben McLachlan and Jan-Lennard Struff in the final, 7–6^{(7–4)}, 6–3.

== Seeds ==
1. (Austria) Oliver Marach / (Croatia) Mate Pavić (quarterfinals)
2. (South Africa) Raven Klaasen / (New Zealand) Michael Venus (first round)
3. (Finland) Henri Kontinen / (Australia) John Peers (first round)
4. (United States) Rajeev Ram / (United Kingdom) Joe Salisbury (champions)

== Draw ==
=== Key ===
- Q = Qualifier
- WC = Wild card
- LL = Lucky loser
- Alt = Alternate
- SE = Special exempt
- PR = Protected ranking
- ITF = ITF entry
- JE = Junior exempt
- w/o = Walkover
- r = Retired
- d = Defaulted
- SR = Special ranking

=== Draw ===
First round
1	(Austria) O Marach (Croatia) M Pavić	6	7
(Croatia) I Dodig (Bosnia and Herzegovina) D Džumhur	3	5
(United Kingdom) D Inglot (Croatia) F Škugor	2	2
(Japan) B McLachlan (Germany) J-L Struff	6	6
3	(Finland) H Kontinen (Australia) J Peers	6	4	[8]
Q	(India) J Nedunchezhiyan (India) P Raja	0	6	[10]
(Netherlands) R Haase (Netherlands) M Middelkoop	7	3	[4]
(Germany) P Kohlschreiber (Spain) F Verdasco	5	6	[10]
WC	(India) L Paes (France) B Paire	6	7^{7}
(India) R Bopanna (India) D Sharan	2	6^{2}
(Russia) K Khachanov (Russia) D Medvedev	2	1
4	(United States) R Ram (United Kingdom) J Salisbury	6	6
(Netherlands) J-J Rojer (Romania) H Tecău	6	6
WC	(Austria) J Melzer (Serbia) N Zimonjić	3	4
(Georgia (country)) N Basilashvili (Australia) M Ebden	7^{7}	3	[10]
2	(South Africa) R Klaasen (New Zealand) M Venus	6^{4}	6	[3]

Quarterfinals
1	(Austria) O Marach (Croatia) M Pavić	5	5
(Japan) B McLachlan (Germany) J-L Struff	7	7
Q	(India) J Nedunchezhiyan (India) P Raja	7^{7}	6^{5}	[10]
(Germany) P Kohlschreiber (Spain) F Verdasco	6^{3}	7^{7}	[8]
WC	(India) L Paes (France) B Paire	1	3
4	(United States) R Ram (United Kingdom) J Salisbury	6	6
(Netherlands) J-J Rojer (Romania) H Tecău	5	7^{7}	[10]
(Georgia (country)) N Basilashvili (Australia) M Ebden	7	6^{3}	[3]

Semifinals
(Japan) B McLachlan (Germany) J-L Struff	6^{5}	6	[12]
Q	(India) J Nedunchezhiyan (India) P Raja	7^{7}	4	[10]
4	(United States) R Ram (United Kingdom) J Salisbury	7^{7}	6
(Netherlands) J-J Rojer (Romania) H Tecău	6^{4}	3

Final
(Japan) B McLachlan (Germany) J-L Struff	6^{4}	3
4	(United States) R Ram (United Kingdom) J Salisbury	7^{7}	6

== Qualifying ==
=== Seeds ===
1. (Ukraine) Denys Molchanov / (Slovakia) Igor Zelenay (first round)
2. (India) Jeevan Nedunchezhiyan / (India) Purav Raja (qualified)

=== Qualifiers ===
1. (India) Jeevan Nedunchezhiyan / (India) Purav Raja

=== Qualifying draw ===
First round
1	(Ukraine) Denys Molchanov (Slovakia) Igor Zelenay	1	4
(Poland) Hubert Hurkacz (United States) Denis Kudla	6	6
WC	(Egypt) Karim-Mohamed Maamoun (Egypt) Mohamed Safwat	6	2	[6]
2	(India) Jeevan Nedunchezhiyan (India) Purav Raja	4	6	[10]

Qualifying competition
(Poland) Hubert Hurkacz (United States) Denis Kudla	4	2
2	(India) Jeevan Nedunchezhiyan (India) Purav Raja	6	6
