= 2019 Barcelona Open Banco Sabadell – Doubles =

Doubles
- 2019 Barcelona Open Banco Sabadell

Final
- Champions: (Colombia) Juan Sebastián Cabal (Colombia) Robert Farah
- Runners-up: (United Kingdom) Jamie Murray (Brazil) Bruno Soares
- Score: 6–4, 7–6^{(7–4)}

Events
Singles	Doubles
← 2018 ·	Barcelona Open Banco Sabadell	· 2020 →

Feliciano López and Marc López were the defending champions, but chose not to participate together. Feliciano López played alongside Pablo Carreño Busta, but lost in the semifinals to Juan Sebastián Cabal and Robert Farah. Marc López teamed up with Marcel Granollers, but lost in the first round to Raven Klaasen and Joe Salisbury.

Cabal and Farah went on to win the title, defeating Jamie Murray and Bruno Soares in the final, 6–4, 7–6^{(7–4)}.

== Seeds ==
1. (Poland) Łukasz Kubot / (Brazil) Marcelo Melo (quarterfinals)
2. (United Kingdom) Jamie Murray / (Brazil) Bruno Soares (final)
3. (Colombia) Juan Sebastián Cabal / (Colombia) Robert Farah (champions)
4. (Austria) Oliver Marach / (Croatia) Mate Pavić (quarterfinals)

== Draw ==
=== Key ===
- Q = Qualifier
- WC = Wild card
- LL = Lucky loser
- Alt = Alternate
- SE = Special exempt
- PR = Protected ranking
- ITF = ITF entry
- JE = Junior exempt
- w/o = Walkover
- r = Retired
- d = Defaulted
- SR = Special ranking

=== Draw ===
First round
1	(Poland) Ł Kubot (Brazil) M Melo	6^{8}	7^{7}	[10]
(Portugal) J Sousa (Austria) D Thiem	7^{10}	6^{5}	[7]
WC	(Spain) P Carreño Busta (Spain) F López	6	6
(Croatia) N Mektić (Croatia) F Škugor	3	4
3	(Colombia) JS Cabal (Colombia) R Farah	6	3	[10]
Q	(Spain) R Carballés Baena (Spain) J Munar	3	6	[5]
(Finland) H Kontinen (Australia) J Peers	7	6
(Argentina) M González (Argentina) H Zeballos	5	4
(Spain) M Granollers (Spain) M López	2	6	[1]
(South Africa) R Klaasen (United Kingdom) J Salisbury	6	3	[10]
(Japan) K Nishikori (Argentina) D Schwartzman	7^{7}	4	[5]
4	(Austria) O Marach (Croatia) M Pavić	6^{5}	6	[10]
(Netherlands) J-J Rojer (Romania) H Tecău	6	7^{8}
WC	(Spain) D Marrero (Spain) F Verdasco	3	6^{6}
(Croatia) I Dodig (France) É Roger-Vasselin	5	6	[5]
2	(United Kingdom) J Murray (Brazil) B Soares	7	1	[10]

Quarterfinals
1	(Poland) Ł Kubot (Brazil) M Melo	3	5
WC	(Spain) P Carreño Busta (Spain) F López	6	7
3	(Colombia) JS Cabal (Colombia) R Farah	6	7^{8}
(Finland) H Kontinen (Australia) J Peers	4	6^{5}
(South Africa) R Klaasen (United Kingdom) J Salisbury	7^{10}	7^{7}
4	(Austria) O Marach (Croatia) M Pavić	6^{8}	6^{4}
(Netherlands) J-J Rojer (Romania) H Tecău	3	3
2	(United Kingdom) J Murray (Brazil) B Soares	6	6

Semifinals
WC	(Spain) P Carreño Busta (Spain) F López	6	2	[10]
3	(Colombia) JS Cabal (Colombia) R Farah	4	6	[12]
(South Africa) R Klaasen (United Kingdom) J Salisbury	6	3	[9]
2	(United Kingdom) J Murray (Brazil) B Soares	4	6	[11]

Final
3	(Colombia) JS Cabal (Colombia) R Farah	6	7^{7}
2	(United Kingdom) J Murray (Brazil) B Soares	4	6^{4}

== Qualifying ==
=== Seeds ===
1. (Japan) Ben McLachlan / (Germany) Jan-Lennard Struff (first round)
2. (United States) Austin Krajicek / (New Zealand) Artem Sitak (first round)

=== Qualifiers ===
1. (Spain) Roberto Carballés Baena / (Spain) Jaume Munar

=== Qualifying draw ===
First round
1	(Japan) Ben McLachlan (Germany) Jan-Lennard Struff	1	6	[9]
WC	(Spain) Roberto Carballés Baena (Spain) Jaume Munar	6	3	[11]
(India) Leander Paes (France) Benoît Paire	4	6	[10]
2	(United States) Austin Krajicek (New Zealand) Artem Sitak	6	4	[7]

Qualifying competition
WC	(Spain) Roberto Carballés Baena (Spain) Jaume Munar	7^{7}	7
(India) Leander Paes (France) Benoît Paire	6^{3}	5
