= 2019 Barcelona Open Banco Sabadell =

- Date: 22–28 April
- Edition: 67th
- Category: ATP Tour 500
- Draw: 48S / 16D
- Prize money: €2,324,905
- Surface: Clay
- Location: Barcelona, Spain
- Venue: Real Club de Tenis Barcelona

Champions

Singles
- (Austria) Dominic Thiem

Doubles
- (Colombia) Juan Sebastián Cabal / (Colombia) Robert Farah
← 2018 ·	Barcelona Open	· 2021 →

The 2019 Barcelona Open Banc Sabadell, also known as the Torneo Godó, was a men's tennis tournament played on outdoor clay courts. It was the 67th edition of the event and part of the ATP Tour 500 series of the 2019 ATP Tour. It took place at the Real Club de Tenis Barcelona in Barcelona, Catalonia, Spain, from 22 April until 28 April 2019. Third-seeded Dominic Thiem won the singles title.

== Points and prize money ==
=== Points distribution ===
Event	W	F	SF	QF	Round of 16	Round of 32	Round of 64	Q	Q2	Q1
Singles	500	300	180	90	45	20	0	10	4	0
Doubles	500	300	180	90	0	—	—	45	25	0

=== Prize money ===
Event	W	F	SF	QF	Round of 16	Round of 32	Round of 64	Q2	Q1
Singles	€503,015	€253,000	€128,000	€67,000	€33,580	€17,685	€9,920	€3,735	€1,865
Doubles	€169,300	€82,880	€41,560	€21,330	€11,020	—	—	—	—

== Singles main-draw entrants ==
=== Seeds ===
Country	Player	Rank^{1}	Seed
ESP	Rafael Nadal	2	1
GER	Alexander Zverev	3	2
AUT	Dominic Thiem	5	3
JPN	Kei Nishikori	6	4
GRE	Stefanos Tsitsipas	8	5
RUS	Karen Khachanov	12	6
RUS	Daniil Medvedev	14	7
ITA	~~Fabio Fognini~~	~~18~~	~~8~~
CAN	Denis Shapovalov	20	9
BEL	David Goffin	21	10
FRA	Gilles Simon	26	11
ESP	Pablo Carreño Busta	27	12
BUL	Grigor Dimitrov	28	13
USA	Frances Tiafoe	29	14
FRA	Lucas Pouille	31	15
CAN	Félix Auger-Aliassime	33	16

- ^{1} Rankings as of April 15, 2019.

=== Other entrants ===
The following players received wildcards into the main draw:

- (Bulgaria) Grigor Dimitrov
- (Spain) David Ferrer
- (Spain) Nicola Kuhn
- (Spain) Feliciano López
- (Germany) Alexander Zverev

The following players received entry from the qualifying draw:

- (Argentina) Federico Delbonis
- (Bolivia) Hugo Dellien
- (Spain) Marcel Granollers
- (Spain) Albert Ramos Viñolas
- (Argentina) Diego Schwartzman
- (Portugal) Pedro Sousa

The following players received entry as lucky losers:

- (Argentina) Guido Andreozzi
- (Spain) Roberto Carballés Baena
- (Chile) Nicolás Jarry

=== Withdrawals ===
- (South Korea) Chung Hyeon → replaced by (Chile) Nicolás Jarry
- (Australia) Alex de Minaur → replaced by (Germany) Mischa Zverev
- (Italy) Fabio Fognini → replaced by (Spain) Roberto Carballés Baena
- (Germany) Philipp Kohlschreiber → replaced by (Argentina) Guido Andreozzi

== Doubles main-draw entrants ==
=== Seeds ===
Country	Player	Country	Player	Rank^{1}	Seed
POL	Łukasz Kubot	BRA	Marcelo Melo	10	1
GBR	Jamie Murray	BRA	Bruno Soares	17	2
COL	Juan Sebastián Cabal	COL	Robert Farah	22	3
AUT	Oliver Marach	CRO	Mate Pavić	23	4

- Rankings are as of April 15, 2019.

=== Other entrants ===
The following pairs received wildcards into the doubles main draw:

- (Spain) Pablo Carreño Busta / (Spain) Feliciano López
- (Spain) David Marrero / (Spain) Fernando Verdasco

The following pair received entry from the qualifying draw:

- (Spain) Roberto Carballés Baena / (Spain) Jaume Munar

== Finals ==
=== Singles ===
- (Austria) Dominic Thiem defeated (Russia) Daniil Medvedev, 6–4, 6–0

=== Doubles ===
- (Colombia) Juan Sebastián Cabal / (Colombia) Robert Farah defeated (United Kingdom) Jamie Murray / (Brazil) Bruno Soares, 6–4, 7–6^{(7–4)}
