= 2019 Citi Open – Men's doubles =

Men's doubles
- 2019 Citi Open

Final
- Champions: (South Africa) Raven Klaasen (New Zealand) Michael Venus
- Runners-up: (Netherlands) Jean-Julien Rojer (Romania) Horia Tecău
- Score: 3−6, 6−3, [10−2]

Details
- Draw: 16
- Seeds: 4

Events
Singles	men	women
Doubles	men	women
- Washington Open

Jamie Murray and Bruno Soares were the defending doubles champions, but chose not to participate together. Jamie played alongside his brother Andy but lost in the quarterfinals to Raven Klaasen and Michael Venus. Soares teamed up with Mate Pavić but lost in the first round to Jean-Julien Rojer and Horia Tecău.

The third-seeded team of Klaasen and Venus went on to win the title, defeating Rojer and Tecău in the final, 3−6, 6−3, [10−2].

== Seeds ==
1. (Colombia) Juan Sebastián Cabal / (Colombia) Robert Farah (quarterfinals)
2. (Poland) Łukasz Kubot / (Brazil) Marcelo Melo (semifinals)
3. (South Africa) Raven Klaasen / (New Zealand) Michael Venus (champions)
4. (Croatia) Mate Pavić / (Brazil) Bruno Soares (first round)

== Draw ==
Key

- Q = Qualifier
- WC = Wild card
- LL = Lucky loser
- Alt = Alternate
- ITF = ITF entry
- PR = Protected ranking
- SR = Special ranking
- SE = Special exempt
- JE = Junior exempt
- JR = Junior Accelerator Programme entrant
- CO = College Accelerator Programme entrant
- NG = Next Gen Accelerator Program entrant
- w/o = Walkover
- r = Retired
- d = Defaulted

=== Draw ===
First round
1	(Colombia) JS Cabal (Colombia) R Farah	6	3	[10]
(Australia) N Kyrgios (Greece) S Tsitsipas	3	6	[5]
WC	(India) L Paes (United States) J Sock	5	2
(Australia) A de Minaur (Australia) J Peers	7	6
4	(Croatia) M Pavić (Brazil) B Soares	6^{9}	6	[7]
(Netherlands) J-J Rojer (Romania) H Tecău	7^{11}	2	[10]
(United States) B Bryan (United States) M Bryan	6	2	[10]
WC	(Philippines) T Huey (United States) D Kudla	4	6	[5]
(United Kingdom) A Murray (United Kingdom) J Murray	6	6^{7}	[10]
(France) N Mahut (France) É Roger-Vasselin	4	7^{9}	[5]
(Germany) K Krawietz (Germany) A Mies	3	6	[7]
3	(South Africa) R Klaasen (New Zealand) M Venus	6	3	[10]
(Croatia) N Mektić (Croatia) F Škugor	6	3	[11]
Q	(Australia) M Ebden (United States) N Monroe	2	6	[13]
(United States) R Ram (United Kingdom) J Salisbury	6	3	[5]
2	(Poland) Ł Kubot (Brazil) M Melo	4	6	[10]

Quarterfinals
1	(Colombia) JS Cabal (Colombia) R Farah	7^{8}	6^{4}	[6]
(Australia) A de Minaur (Australia) J Peers	6^{6}	7^{7}	[10]
(Netherlands) J-J Rojer (Romania) H Tecău	7^{7}	4	[10]
(United States) B Bryan (United States) M Bryan	6^{5}	6	[8]
(United Kingdom) A Murray (United Kingdom) J Murray	7^{7}	6^{6}	[7]
3	(South Africa) R Klaasen (New Zealand) M Venus	6^{3}	7^{8}	[10]
Q	(Australia) M Ebden (United States) N Monroe	2	7	[2]
2	(Poland) Ł Kubot (Brazil) M Melo	6	5	[10]

Semifinals
(Australia) A de Minaur (Australia) J Peers	4	4
(Netherlands) J-J Rojer (Romania) H Tecău	6	6
3	(South Africa) R Klaasen (New Zealand) M Venus	6	7^{7}
2	(Poland) Ł Kubot (Brazil) M Melo	2	6^{2}

Final
(Netherlands) J-J Rojer (Romania) H Tecău	6	3	[2]
3	(South Africa) R Klaasen (New Zealand) M Venus	3	6	[10]

== Qualifying ==
=== Seeds ===
1. (India) Rohan Bopanna / (France) Benoît Paire (qualifying competition)
2. (Australia) Matthew Ebden / (United States) Nicholas Monroe (qualified)

=== Qualifiers ===
1. (Australia) Matthew Ebden / (United States) Nicholas Monroe

=== Qualifying draw ===
First round
1	(India) Rohan Bopanna (France) Benoît Paire	6	6
WC	(United States) Nathan Pasha (United States) Max Schnur	4	3
(United States) James Cerretani (Canada) Brayden Schnur	2	6^{9}
2	(Australia) Matthew Ebden (United States) Nicholas Monroe	6	7^{11}

Qualifying competition
1	(India) Rohan Bopanna (France) Benoît Paire	6	3	[7]
2	(Australia) Matthew Ebden (United States) Nicholas Monroe	2	6	[10]
