= 2019 Dubai Tennis Championships – Men's singles =

Men's singles
- 2019 Dubai Tennis Championships

Final
- Champion: (Switzerland) Roger Federer
- Runner-up: (Greece) Stefanos Tsitsipas
- Score: 6–4, 6–4

Details
- Draw: 32 (4 Q / 3 WC )
- Seeds: 8

Events
Singles	men	women
Doubles	men	women
- Dubai Tennis Championships

Roberto Bautista Agut was the defending champion, but lost in the second round to Nikoloz Basilashvili.

Roger Federer won his eighth Dubai title, and 100th ATP singles title overall, defeating Stefanos Tsitsipas, 6–4, 6–4, in the final. Federer became the second male tennis player in history after Jimmy Connors in 1983 to win 100 ATP singles titles.

Following his run to the final, Tsitsipas entered the top 10 in the ATP rankings for the first time in his career, becoming the first Greek player to achieve this feat.

== Seeds ==
1. (Japan) Kei Nishikori (second round)
2. (Switzerland) Roger Federer (champion)
3. (Croatia) Marin Čilić (first round)
4. (Russia) Karen Khachanov (first round)
5. (Greece) Stefanos Tsitsipas (final)
6. (Croatia) Borna Ćorić (semifinals)
7. (Canada) Milos Raonic (first round)
8. (Russia) Daniil Medvedev (first round)

== Draw ==
Key

- Q = Qualifier
- WC = Wild card
- LL = Lucky loser
- Alt = Alternate
- ITF = ITF entry
- PR = Protected ranking
- SR = Special ranking
- SE = Special exempt
- JE = Junior exempt
- JR = Junior Accelerator Programme entrant
- CO = College Accelerator Programme entrant
- NG = Next Gen Accelerator Program entrant
- w/o = Walkover
- r = Retired
- d = Defaulted

=== Finals ===
Semifinals
5	(Greece) Stefanos Tsitsipas	4	7^{7}	7^{7}
(France) Gaël Monfils	6	6^{4}	6^{4}
6	(Croatia) Borna Ćorić	2	2
2	(Switzerland) Roger Federer	6	6

Final
5	(Greece) Stefanos Tsitsipas	4	4
2	(Switzerland) Roger Federer	6	6

=== Top half ===
First round
1	(Japan) K Nishikori	6	6
(France) B Paire	4	3
(Poland) H Hurkacz	6	7
Q	(France) C Moutet	3	5
Q	(Belarus) E Gerasimov	7^{7}	7^{7}
(Netherlands) R Haase	6^{2}	6^{5}
(Australia) M Ebden	4	6	3
5	(Greece) S Tsitsipas	6	3	6
3	(Croatia) M Čilić	3	6	0
(France) G Monfils	6	4	6
WC	(Egypt) M Safwat	6	3	4
WC	(Cyprus) M Baghdatis	4	6	6
(Italy) M Berrettini	6	5	5
(United States) D Kudla	2	7	7
Q	(Lithuania) R Berankis	6	6
8	(Russia) D Medvedev	3	3

Second round
1	(Japan) K Nishikori	5	7	2
(Poland) H Hurkacz	7	5	6
Q	(Belarus) E Gerasimov	3	1
5	(Greece) S Tsitsipas	6	6
(France) G Monfils	6	6
WC	(Cyprus) M Baghdatis	3	2
(United States) D Kudla	4	1
Q	(Lithuania) R Berankis	6	6

Quarterfinals
(Poland) H Hurkacz	6^{4}	7^{7}	1
5	(Greece) S Tsitsipas	7^{7}	6^{1}	6
(France) G Monfils	6	6^{3}	6
Q	(Lithuania) R Berankis	1	7^{7}	2

Semifinals
5	(Greece) S Tsitsipas	4	7^{7}	7^{7}
(France) G Monfils	6	6^{4}	6^{4}

=== Bottom half ===
First round
6	(Croatia) B Ćorić	7	3	7^{7}
LL	(Czech Republic) J Veselý	5	6	6^{4}
(Czech Republic) T Berdych	6	4	7^{7}
LL	(Belarus) I Ivashka	4	6	6^{4}
(Spain) R Bautista Agut	6	6
WC	(India) R Ramanathan	4	3
(Georgia (country)) N Basilashvili	6	6
4	(Russia) K Khachanov	4	1
7	(Canada) M Raonic	4	7	4
(Germany) J-L Struff	6	5	6
(Bosnia and Herzegovina) D Džumhur	1	6^{5}
(Hungary) M Fucsovics	6	7^{7}
Q	(Italy) T Fabbiano	6	3	2
(Spain) F Verdasco	3	6	6
(Germany) P Kohlschreiber	4	6	1
2	(Switzerland) R Federer	6	3	6

Second round
6	(Croatia) B Ćorić	1	6	7^{7}
(Czech Republic) T Berdych	6	1	6^{4}
(Spain) R Bautista Agut	7^{7}	4	3
(Georgia (country)) N Basilashvili	6^{2}	6	6
(Germany) J-L Struff	4	2
(Hungary) M Fucsovics	6	6
(Spain) F Verdasco	3	6	3
2	(Switzerland) R Federer	6	3	6

Quarterfinals
6	(Croatia) B Ćorić	4	6	7^{7}
(Georgia (country)) N Basilashvili	6	2	6^{1}
(Hungary) M Fucsovics	6^{6}	4
2	(Switzerland) R Federer	7^{8}	6

Semifinals
6	(Croatia) B Ćorić	2	2
2	(Switzerland) R Federer	6	6

== Qualifying ==
=== Seeds ===
1. (Belarus) Ilya Ivashka (qualifying competition, lucky loser)
2. (Italy) Thomas Fabbiano (qualified)
3. (Czech Republic) Jiří Veselý (qualifying competition, lucky loser)
4. (Lithuania) Ričardas Berankis (qualified)
5. (France) Corentin Moutet (qualified)
6. (France) Antoine Hoang (qualifying competition)
7. (Belarus) Egor Gerasimov (qualified)
8. (Bosnia and Herzegovina) Mirza Bašić (qualifying competition)

=== Qualifiers ===
1. (France) Corentin Moutet
2. (Italy) Thomas Fabbiano
3. (Belarus) Egor Gerasimov
4. (Lithuania) Ričardas Berankis

=== Lucky losers ===
1. (Belarus) Ilya Ivashka
2. (Czech Republic) Jiří Veselý

=== Qualifying draw ===
==== First qualifier ====
First round
1	(Belarus) Ilya Ivashka	5	7	6
(Russia) Alexey Vatutin	7	5	2
WC	(Egypt) Karim-Mohamed Maamoun	3	6^{0}
5	(France) Corentin Moutet	6	7^{7}

Qualifying competition
1	(Belarus) Ilya Ivashka	1	3
5	(France) Corentin Moutet	6	6

==== Second qualifier ====
First round
2	(Italy) Thomas Fabbiano	6	6
(Germany) Rudolf Molleker	3	3
WC	(Egypt) Adham Gabr	1	0
6	(France) Antoine Hoang	6	6

Qualifying competition
2	(Italy) Thomas Fabbiano	7^{8}	7
6	(France) Antoine Hoang	6^{6}	5

==== Third qualifier ====
First round
3	(Czech Republic) Jiří Veselý	7^{7}	7^{7}
(United Kingdom) James Ward	6^{4}	6^{4}
(Kazakhstan) Aleksandr Nedovyesov	6^{3}	5
7	(Belarus) Egor Gerasimov	7^{7}	7

Qualifying competition
3	(Czech Republic) Jiří Veselý	6^{5}	4
7	(Belarus) Egor Gerasimov	7^{7}	6

==== Fourth qualifier ====
First round
4	(Lithuania) Ričardas Berankis	6	3	6
(France) Constant Lestienne	3	6	2
WC	(Republic of Ireland) Simon Carr	3	3
8	(Bosnia and Herzegovina) Mirza Bašić	6	6

Qualifying competition
4	(Lithuania) Ričardas Berankis	7^{9}	6
8	(Bosnia and Herzegovina) Mirza Bašić	6^{7}	4
