= 2019 Barcelona Open Banco Sabadell – Singles =

Singles
- 2019 Barcelona Open Banco Sabadell

Final
- Champion: (Austria) Dominic Thiem
- Runner-up: (Russia) Daniil Medvedev
- Score: 6–4, 6–0

Details
- Draw: 48 (6 Q / 5 WC )
- Seeds: 16

Events
Singles	Doubles
← 2018 ·	Barcelona Open Banco Sabadell	· 2021 →

Dominic Thiem defeated Daniil Medvedev in the final, 6–4, 6–0, to win the singles title at the 2019 Barcelona Open.

Rafael Nadal was the three-time defending champion, but lost in the semifinals to Thiem.

== Seeds ==
All seeds received a bye into the second round.

1. (Spain) Rafael Nadal (semifinals)
2. (Germany) Alexander Zverev (second round)
3. (Austria) Dominic Thiem (champion)
4. (Japan) Kei Nishikori (semifinals)
5. (Greece) Stefanos Tsitsipas (third round)
6. (Russia) Karen Khachanov (second round)
7. (Russia) Daniil Medvedev (final)
8. (Italy) Fabio Fognini (withdrew)

9. (Canada) Denis Shapovalov (second round)
10. (Belgium) David Goffin (second round)
11. (France) Gilles Simon (second round)
12. (Spain) Pablo Carreño Busta (second round)
13. (Bulgaria) Grigor Dimitrov (third round)
14. (United States) Frances Tiafoe (second round)
15. (France) Lucas Pouille (second round)
16. (Canada) Félix Auger-Aliassime (third round)

Click on the seed number of a player to go to their draw section.

Note: Diego Schwartzman, who would have been placed in the entry list on the initial entry cutoff date of 11 March 2019 and seeded 11th, entered late and played in the qualifying tournament.

== Draw ==
=== Key ===
- Q = Qualifier
- WC = Wild card
- LL = Lucky loser
- Alt = Alternate
- SE = Special exempt
- PR = Protected ranking
- ITF = ITF entry
- JE = Junior exempt
- w/o = Walkover
- r = Retired
- d = Defaulted
- SR = Special ranking

=== Finals ===
Quarterfinals
1	(Spain) Rafael Nadal	7	7
(Germany) Jan-Lennard Struff	5	5
3	(Austria) Dominic Thiem	7	6
(Argentina) Guido Pella	5	2
LL	(Spain) Roberto Carballés Baena	4	5
4	(Japan) Kei Nishikori	6	7
7	(Russia) Daniil Medvedev	6	6
LL	(Chile) Nicolás Jarry	3	4

Semifinals
1	(Spain) Rafael Nadal	4	4
3	(Austria) Dominic Thiem	6	6
4	(Japan) Kei Nishikori	4	6	5
7	(Russia) Daniil Medvedev	6	3	7

Final
3	(Austria) Dominic Thiem	6	6
7	(Russia) Daniil Medvedev	4	0

=== Top half ===
==== Section 1 ====
First round
(Romania) M Copil	3	7^{7}	5
(Argentina) L Mayer	6	6^{3}	7
WC	(Spain) D Ferrer	6	6
(Germany) M Zverev	3	1
Q	(Bolivia) H Dellien	3	1
(Germany) J-L Struff	6	6
(Hungary) M Fucsovics	6	6
(United States) D Kudla	4	1

Second round
1	(Spain) R Nadal	6^{7}	6	6
(Argentina) L Mayer	7^{9}	4	2
WC	(Spain) D Ferrer	6	6
15	(France) L Pouille	3	1
10	(Belgium) D Goffin	6^{6}	3
(Germany) J-L Struff	7^{8}	6
(Hungary) M Fucsovics	3	4
5	(Greece) S Tsitsipas	6	6

Third round
1	(Spain) R Nadal	6	6
WC	(Spain) D Ferrer	3	3
(Germany) J-L Struff	6	3	6
5	(Greece) S Tsitsipas	4	6	2

Quarterfinals
1	(Spain) R Nadal	7	7
(Germany) J-L Struff	5	5

==== Section 2 ====
First round
(Japan) Y Nishioka	6	4	2
Q	(Argentina) D Schwartzman	4	6	6
Q	(Portugal) P Sousa	6	4	0
(Spain) J Munar	2	6	6
(Argentina) JI Londero	5	2
(France) B Paire	7	6
(Argentina) G Pella	3	7^{7}	6
(Portugal) J Sousa	6	6^{1}	2

Second round
3	(Austria) D Thiem	6	6
Q	(Argentina) D Schwartzman	3	3
(Spain) J Munar	6	6
14	(United States) F Tiafoe	4	3
12	(Spain) P Carreño Busta	4	7^{11}	1
(France) B Paire	6	6^{9}	6
(Argentina) G Pella	6	7^{7}
6	(Russia) K Khachanov	2	6^{4}

Third round
3	(Austria) D Thiem	7	6
(Spain) J Munar	5	1
(France) B Paire	5	3
(Argentina) G Pella	7	6

Quarterfinals
3	(Austria) D Thiem	7	6
(Argentina) G Pella	5	2

=== Bottom half ===
==== Section 3 ====
First round
WC	(Spain) N Kuhn	7^{7}	4	6
Q	(Argentina) F Delbonis	6^{3}	6	2
(Slovakia) M Kližan	5	4
(Chile) C Garín	7	6
(Tunisia) M Jaziri	6^{3}	6	6
LL	(Argentina) G Andreozzi	7^{7}	4	2
(United States) T Fritz	6	6
(United States) R Opelka	3	4

Second round
LL	(Spain) R Carballés Baena	6^{4}	6	6
WC	(Spain) N Kuhn	7^{7}	4	2
(Chile) C Garín	7	6
9	(Canada) D Shapovalov	5	2
16	(Canada) F Auger-Aliassime	6	7^{9}
(Tunisia) M Jaziri	3	6^{7}
(United States) T Fritz	5	2
4	(Japan) K Nishikori	7	6

Third round
LL	(Spain) R Carballés Baena	6	7^{7}
(Chile) C Garín	4	6^{2}
16	(Canada) F Auger-Aliassime	1	3
4	(Japan) K Nishikori	6	6

Quarterfinals
LL	(Spain) R Carballés Baena	4	5
4	(Japan) K Nishikori	6	7

==== Section 4 ====
First round
Q	(Spain) A Ramos Viñolas	6	6
(United Kingdom) C Norrie	2	2
(United States) M McDonald	6	6
(Japan) T Daniel	2	2
WC	(Spain) F López	4	3
(Spain) F Verdasco	6	6
LL	(Chile) N Jarry	7	4	6
Q	(Spain) M Granollers	5	6	4

Second round
7	(Russia) D Medvedev	6	2	6
Q	(Spain) A Ramos Viñolas	3	6	1
(United States) M McDonald	6	6
11	(France) G Simon	3	2
13/WC	(Bulgaria) G Dimitrov	6	6^{4}	6
(Spain) F Verdasco	2	7^{7}	3
LL	(Chile) N Jarry	3	7	7^{7}
2/WC	(Germany) A Zverev	6	5	6^{5}

Third round
7	(Russia) D Medvedev	6	6
(United States) M McDonald	3	2
13/WC	(Bulgaria) G Dimitrov	6	4	6^{2}
LL	(Chile) N Jarry	2	6	7^{7}

Quarterfinals
7	(Russia) D Medvedev	6	6
LL	(Chile) N Jarry	3	4

== Qualifying ==
=== Seeds ===
1. (Argentina) Diego Schwartzman (qualified)
2. (Argentina) Federico Delbonis (qualified)
3. (Bolivia) Hugo Dellien (qualified)
4. (Spain) Albert Ramos Viñolas (qualified)
5. (Chile) Nicolás Jarry (qualifying competition, lucky loser)
6. (Argentina) Guido Andreozzi (qualifying competition, lucky loser)
7. (Spain) Pablo Andújar (withdrew)
8. (United Kingdom) Dan Evans (first round)
9. (Russia) Andrey Rublev (first round)
10. (Spain) Roberto Carballés Baena (qualifying competition, lucky loser)
11. (Uzbekistan) Denis Istomin (first round)
12. (Portugal) Pedro Sousa (qualified)

=== Qualifiers ===
1. (Argentina) Diego Schwartzman
2. (Argentina) Federico Delbonis
3. (Bolivia) Hugo Dellien
4. (Spain) Albert Ramos Viñolas
5. (Spain) Marcel Granollers
6. (Portugal) Pedro Sousa

=== Lucky losers ===
1. (Chile) Nicolás Jarry
2. (Argentina) Guido Andreozzi
3. (Spain) Roberto Carballés Baena

=== Qualifying draw ===
==== First qualifier ====
First round
1	(Argentina) Diego Schwartzman	6	6
(Slovakia) Jozef Kovalík	4	4
Alt	(Spain) Pedro Martínez	5	1
10	(Spain) Roberto Carballés Baena	7	6

Qualifying competition
1	(Argentina) Diego Schwartzman	6	6
10	(Spain) Roberto Carballés Baena	4	4

==== Second qualifier ====
First round
2	(Argentina) Federico Delbonis	7^{7}	6
(Brazil) Thiago Monteiro	6^{4}	3
(Spain) Guillermo García López	6	6
Alt	(Argentina) Carlos Berlocq	4	3

Qualifying competition
2	(Argentina) Federico Delbonis	6	6
(Spain) Guillermo García López	3	0

==== Third qualifier ====
First round
3	(Bolivia) Hugo Dellien	6^{3}	7^{7}	7^{7}
(France) Grégoire Barrère	7^{7}	6^{3}	6^{3}
(France) Antoine Hoang	5	7^{7}	7^{7}
9	(Russia) Andrey Rublev	7	6^{4}	6^{4}

Qualifying competition
3	(Bolivia) Hugo Dellien	6	6
(France) Antoine Hoang	4	4

==== Fourth qualifier ====
First round
4	(Spain) Albert Ramos Viñolas	6	7^{7}
(Australia) Alexei Popyrin	2	6^{4}
WC	(Spain) Alejandro Davidovich Fokina	6	6
11	(Uzbekistan) Denis Istomin	4	4

Qualifying competition
4	(Spain) Albert Ramos Viñolas	7	7
WC	(Spain) Alejandro Davidovich Fokina	5	5

==== Fifth qualifier ====
First round
5	(Chile) Nicolás Jarry	6	3	7^{7}
WC	(Chinese Taipei) Tseng Chun-hsin	4	6	6^{5}
(Spain) Marcel Granollers	6	4	7
8	(United Kingdom) Dan Evans	3	6	5

Qualifying competition
5	(Chile) Nicolás Jarry	7^{7}	5	4
(Spain) Marcel Granollers	6^{3}	7	6

==== Sixth qualifier ====
First round
6	(Argentina) Guido Andreozzi	3	6	7^{7}
WC	(Spain) Tommy Robredo	6	3	6^{4}
WC	(Spain) Carlos Alcaraz	7^{7}	3	1
12	(Portugal) Pedro Sousa	6^{5}	6	6

Qualifying competition
6	(Argentina) Guido Andreozzi	4	2
12	(Portugal) Pedro Sousa	6	6
