= 2019 Citi Open =

- Date: July 29 – August 4
- Edition: 51st (men) / 9th (women)
- Category: ATP Tour 500 (men); WTA International (women)
- Surface: Hard (outdoor); SportMaster Sport Surfaces
- Location: Washington, D.C., United States
- Venue: William H.G. FitzGerald Tennis Center

Champions

Men's singles
- (Australia) Nick Kyrgios

Women's singles
- (United States) Jessica Pegula

Men's doubles
- (South Africa) Raven Klaasen / (New Zealand) Michael Venus

Women's doubles
- (United States) Coco Gauff / (United States) Caty McNally
- Washington Open

The 2019 Washington Open (called the Citi Open for sponsorship reasons) was a tennis tournament played on outdoor hard courts. It was the 51st edition (for the men) and the 9th edition (for the women) of the Washington Open. The event was part of the ATP Tour 500 series of the 2019 ATP Tour, and of the WTA International tournaments of the 2019 WTA Tour. It took place at the William H.G. FitzGerald Tennis Center in Washington, D.C., United States, from July 29 to August 4, 2019. Nick Kyrgios and Jessica Pegula won the singles titles.

== Finals ==
=== Men's singles ===
- (Australia) Nick Kyrgios defeated (Russia) Daniil Medvedev, 7−6^{(8−6)}, 7−6^{(7−4)}

=== Women's singles ===
- (United States) Jessica Pegula defeated (Italy) Camila Giorgi, 6–2, 6–2

=== Men's doubles ===
- (South Africa) Raven Klaasen / (New Zealand) Michael Venus defeated (Netherlands) Jean-Julien Rojer / (Romania) Horia Tecău, 3−6, 6−3, [10−2]

=== Women's doubles ===
- (United States) Cori Gauff / (United States) Caty McNally defeated (United States) Maria Sanchez / (Hungary) Fanny Stollár, 6–2, 6–2

== Points and prize money ==
=== Point distribution ===
Event	W	F	SF	QF	Round of 16	Round of 32	Round of 64	Q	Q2	Q1
Men's singles	500	300	180	90	45	20	0	10	4	0
Men's doubles	500	300	180	90	0	—N/a	—N/a	45	25	0
Women's singles	280	180	110	60	30	1	—N/a	18	12	1
Women's doubles	280	180	110	60	1	—N/a	—N/a	—N/a	—N/a	—N/a

=== Prize money ===
Event	W	F	SF	QF	Round of 16	Round of 32	Round of 64^{1}	Q2	Q1
Men's singles	$365,390	$183,780	$92,980	$48,670	$24,400	$12,845	$7,205	$2,710	$1,355
Men's doubles *	$123,000	$60,200	$30,190	$15,500	$8,000	—N/a	—N/a	—N/a	—N/a
Women's singles	$43,000	$21,400	$11,500	$6,200	$3,420	$2,220	—N/a	$1,285	$750
Women's doubles *	$12,300	$6,400	$3,435	$1,820	$960	—N/a	—N/a	—N/a	—N/a

_{^{1} Qualifiers prize money is also the Round of 64 prize money}
_{* per team}

== ATP singles main-draw entrants ==
=== Seeds ===
Country	Player	Rank^{1}	Seed
GRE	Stefanos Tsitsipas	6	1
RUS	Karen Khachanov	8	2
RUS	Daniil Medvedev	9	3
~~RSA~~	~~Kevin Anderson~~	~~11~~	~~4~~
USA	John Isner	14	5
CRO	Marin Čilić	17	6
BEL	David Goffin	18	7
CAN	Milos Raonic	21	8
CAN	Félix Auger-Aliassime	23	9
FRA	Benoît Paire	28	10
FRA	Gilles Simon	33	11
AUS	Alex de Minaur	34	12
GBR	Kyle Edmund	35	13
GER	Jan-Lennard Struff	36	14
FRA	Pierre-Hugues Herbert	39	15
USA	Frances Tiafoe	41	16

- Rankings are as of July 22, 2019

=== Other entrants ===
The following players received wild cards into the main singles draw:

- (United States) Christopher Eubanks
- (United States) Bjorn Fratangelo
- (United States) Tommy Paul
- (United States) Jack Sock

The following players received entry from the singles qualifying draw:

- (United States) Thai-Son Kwiatkowski
- (Australia) Marc Polmans
- (Canada) Brayden Schnur
- (United States) Tim Smyczek
- (Denmark) Mikael Torpegaard
- (United States) Donald Young

The following players received entry as lucky losers:

- (Germany) Peter Gojowczyk
- (Slovakia) Norbert Gombos
- (Belarus) Ilya Ivashka

=== Withdrawals ===
- (South Africa) Kevin Anderson → replaced by (Slovakia) Norbert Gombos
- (Czech Republic) Tomáš Berdych → replaced by (Romania) Marius Copil
- (France) Ugo Humbert → replaced by (Belarus) Ilya Ivashka
- (France) Gaël Monfils → replaced by (Kazakhstan) Alexander Bublik
- (Japan) Kei Nishikori → replaced by (United States) Bradley Klahn
- (United States) Sam Querrey → replaced by (Tunisia) Malek Jaziri
- (Canada) Denis Shapovalov → replaced by (South Africa) Lloyd Harris
- (Australia) Bernard Tomic → replaced by (Germany) Peter Gojowczyk

== ATP doubles main-draw entrants ==
=== Seeds ===
Country	Player	Country	Player	Rank^{1}	Seed
COL	Juan Sebastián Cabal	COL	Robert Farah	2	1
POL	Łukasz Kubot	BRA	Marcelo Melo	9	2
RSA	Raven Klaasen	NZL	Michael Venus	20	3
CRO	Mate Pavić	BRA	Bruno Soares	24	4

- ^{1} Rankings are as of July 22, 2019

=== Other entrants ===
The following pairs received wildcards into the doubles main draw:

- (Philippines) Treat Huey / (United States) Denis Kudla
- (India) Leander Paes / (United States) Jack Sock

The following pair received entry from the doubles qualifying draw:

- (Australia) Matthew Ebden / (United States) Nicholas Monroe

== WTA singles main-draw entrants ==
=== Seeds ===
Country	Player	Rank ^{1}	Seed
USA	Sloane Stephens	8	1
USA	Madison Keys	17	2
USA	Sofia Kenin	28	3
TPE	Hsieh Su-wei	31	4
UKR	Lesia Tsurenko	36	5
CZE	Kateřina Siniaková	41	6
RUS	Anastasia Pavlyuchenkova	44	7
PUR	Monica Puig	45	8

- Rankings are as of July 22, 2019

=== Other entrants ===
The following players received wild cards into the main singles draw:

- (United States) Hailey Baptiste
- (United States) Allie Kiick
- (United States) Caty McNally

The following player received entry using a protected ranking into the singles main draw:

- (United States) Shelby Rogers

The following players received entry from the qualifying draw:

- (United States) Cori Gauff
- (Russia) Varvara Gracheva
- (Russia) Anna Kalinskaya
- (United States) Sachia Vickery

=== Withdrawals ===
Before the tournament

- (Canada) Bianca Andreescu → replaced by (United States) Lauren Davis
- (Switzerland) Belinda Bencic → replaced by (Kazakhstan) Zarina Diyas
- (Russia) Margarita Gasparyan → replaced by (Russia) Anna Blinkova
- (Czech Republic) Barbora Strýcová → replaced by (United States) Shelby Rogers
- (Russia) Vera Zvonareva → replaced by (Belgium) Kirsten Flipkens

== WTA doubles main-draw entrants ==
=== Seeds ===
Country	Player	Country	Player	Rank^{1}	Seed
RUS	Anna Blinkova	CZE	Kateřina Siniaková	72	1
CHN	Wang Yafan	CHN	Yang Zhaoxuan	139	2
RUS	Anna Kalinskaya	JPN	Miyu Kato	156	3
USA	Maria Sanchez	HUN	Fanny Stollár	171	4

- ^{1} Rankings are as of July 22, 2019

=== Other entrants ===
The following pair received a wildcard into the doubles main draw:

- (United States) Cori Gauff / (United States) Caty McNally
- (United States) Cameron Morra / (United States) Alana Smith

=== Withdrawals ===
Before the tournament

- (United States) Hayley Carter (medical condition)

During the tournament

- (United States) Allie Kiick (ankle injury)
