= 2019 ATP Tour =

Men's tennis circuit

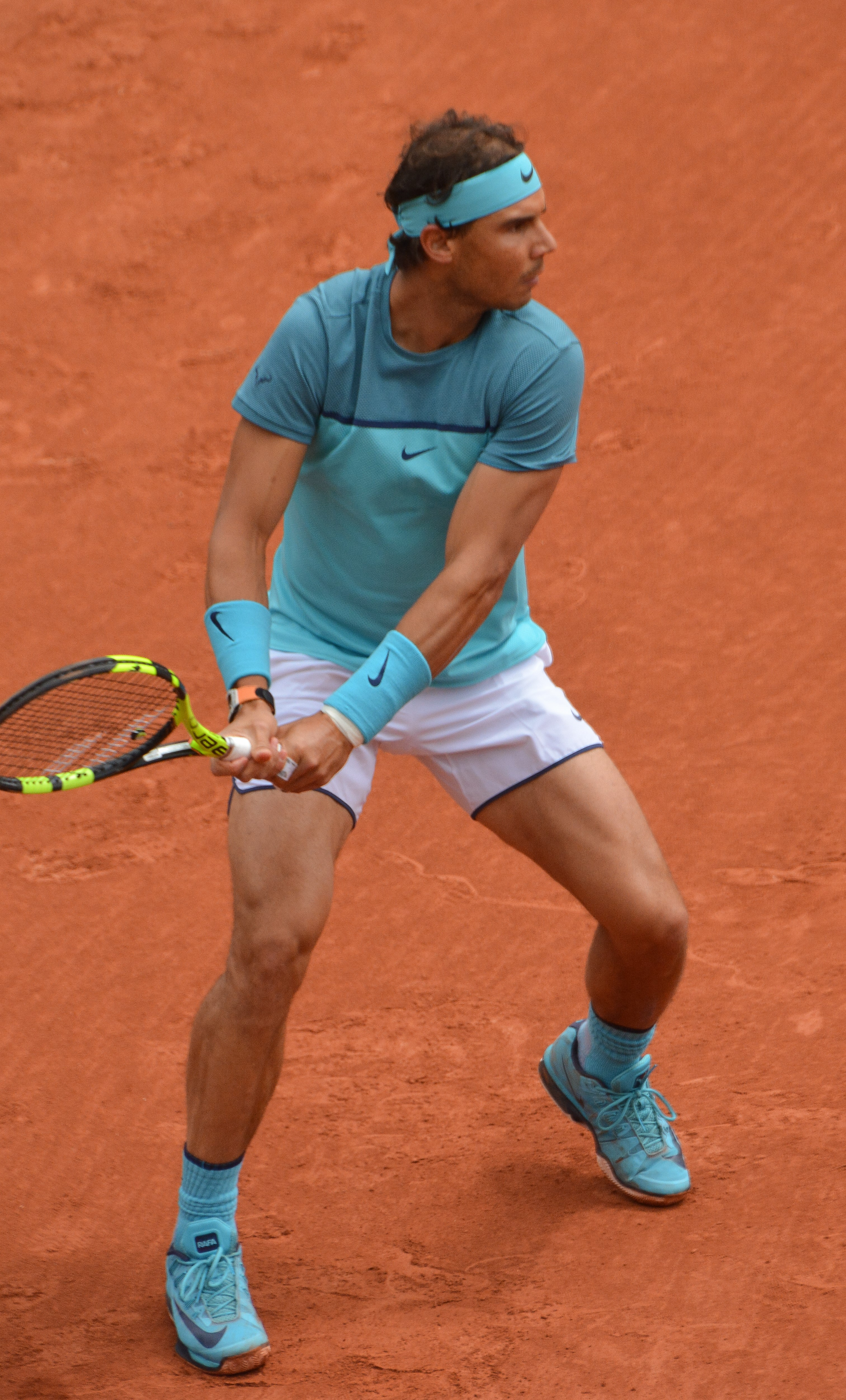
- Rafael Nadal finished the year as world No. 1 for the fifth time in his career. He won four tournaments during the season, including two majors at the French Open and the US Open. He also won two Masters 1000 events and finished runner-up at another major, the Australian Open.

Details
- Duration: 29 Dec 2018 – 24 Nov 2019
- Edition: 50th
- Tournaments: 66
- Categories: Grand Slam (4); ATP Finals; ATP 1000 (9); ATP 500 (13); ATP 250 (39)

Achievements (singles)
- Most titles: (Serbia) Novak Djokovic; (Austria) Dominic Thiem; (5)
- Most finals: (Russia) Daniil Medvedev (9)
- Prize money leader: (Spain) Rafael Nadal ($16,349,586)
- Points leader: (Spain) Rafael Nadal (9,985)

Awards
- Player of the year: (Spain) Rafael Nadal
- Doubles team of the year: (Colombia) Juan Sebastián Cabal; (Colombia) Robert Farah
- Most improved player of the year: (Italy) Matteo Berrettini
- Newcomer of the year: (Italy) Jannik Sinner
- Comeback player of the year: (United Kingdom) Andy Murray

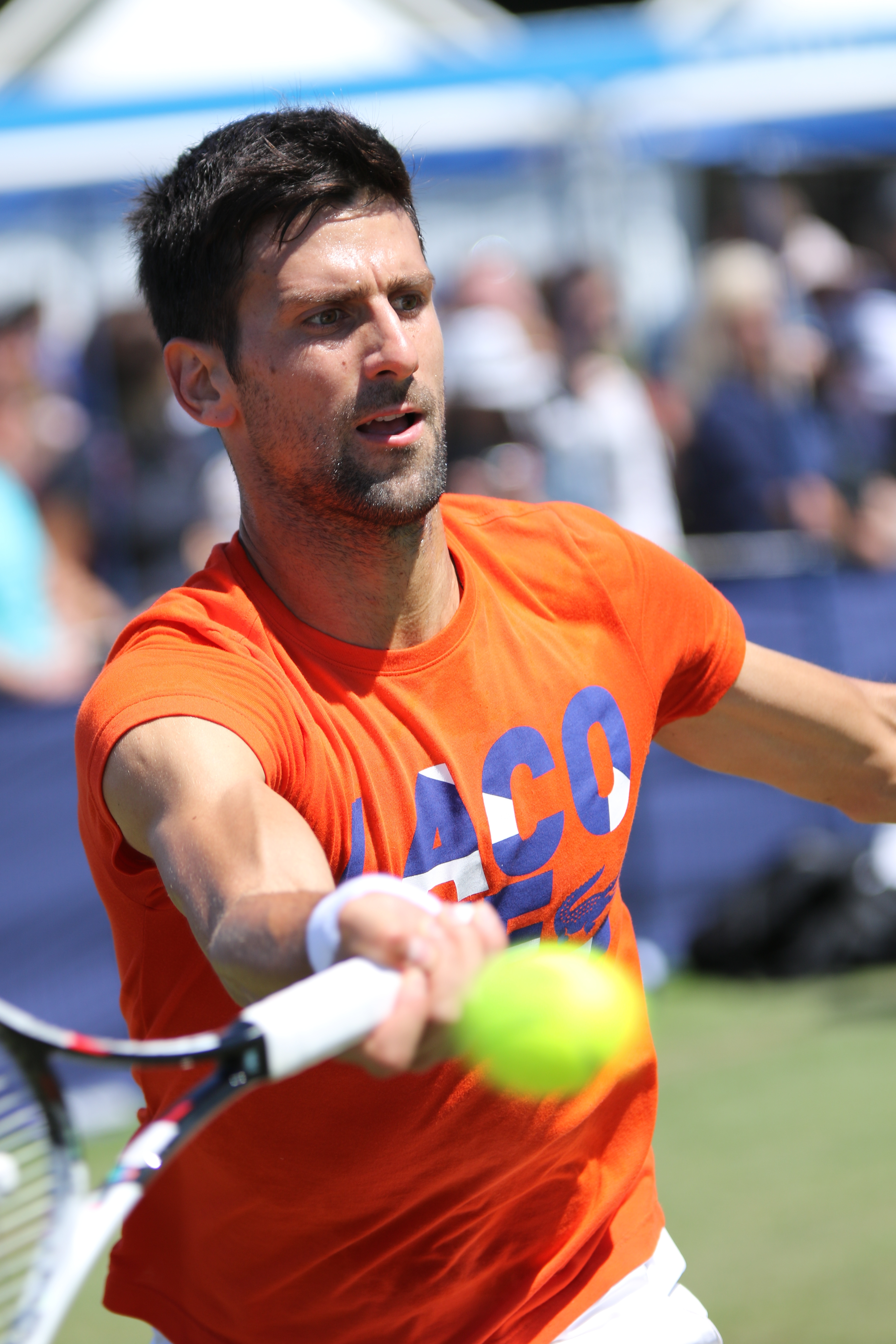
Novak Djokovic won a record seventh Australian Open title, defeating Rafael Nadal in the final for a 15th major title, surpassing Pete Sampras' tally of 14. At Wimbledon, Djokovic defeated Roger Federer in the final after saving two championship points to claim his fifth Wimbledon title and 16th major triumph.

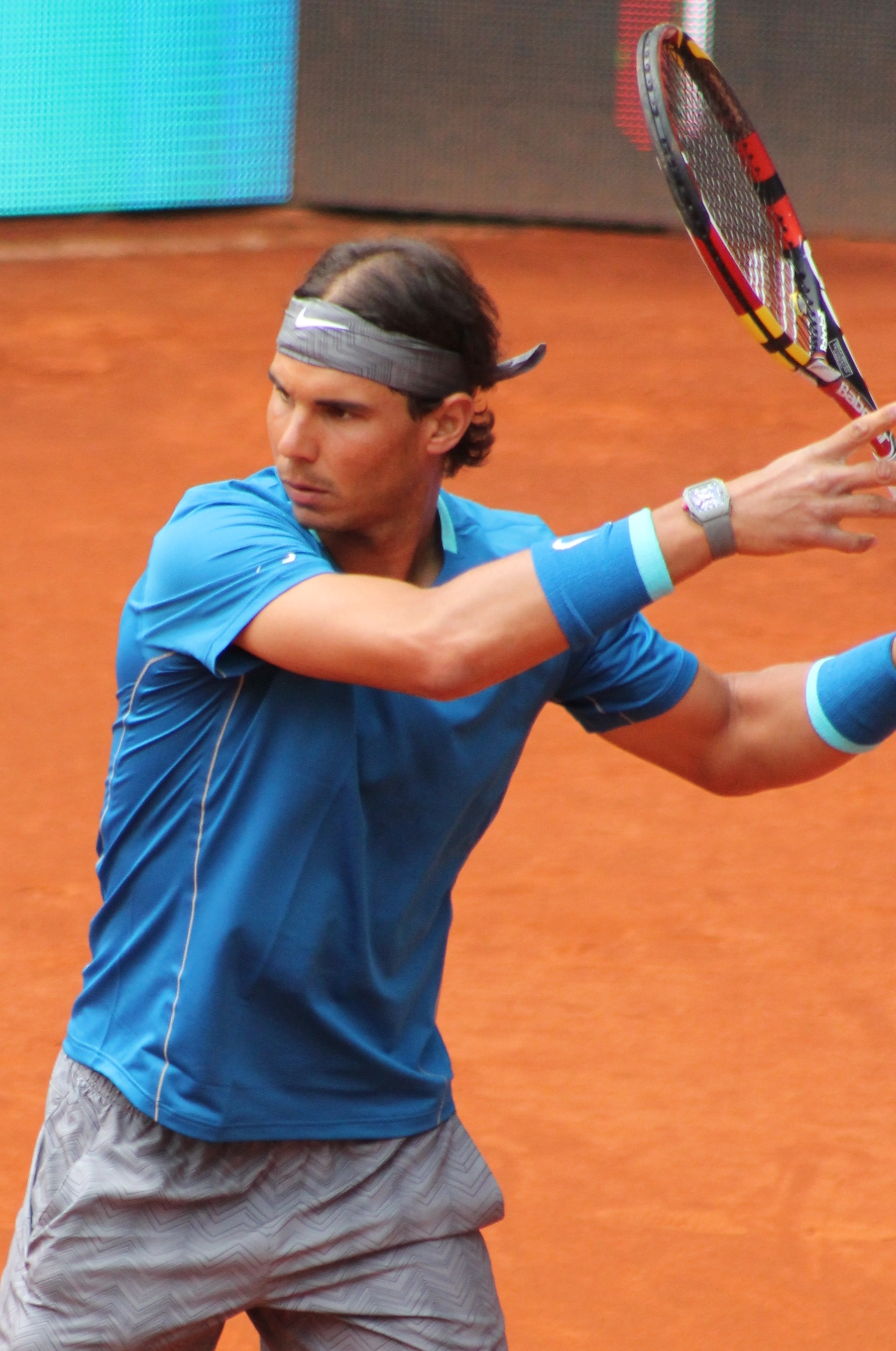
Rafael Nadal won a record-extending 12th French Open title, defeating Dominic Thiem in the final. In US Open, Nadal defeated Daniil Medvedev in five sets to secure his fourth US Open title and 19th major overall, only one shy of the Majors record of 20 won by Federer.

The 2019 ATP Tour was the global elite men's professional tennis circuit organised by the Association of Tennis Professionals (ATP) for the 2019 tennis season. The 2019 ATP Tour calendar comprised the Grand Slam tournaments (supervised by the International Tennis Federation (ITF)), the ATP Tour Masters 1000, the ATP Finals, the ATP Tour 500 series, the ATP Tour 250 series and Davis Cup (organised by the ITF). Also included in the 2019 calendar were the Hopman Cup, the Laver Cup and the Next Gen ATP Finals which do not distribute ranking points. For the Masters series events the ATP introduced a shot clock. Players had a minute to come on court, 5 minutes to warmup, and then a minute to commence play, as well as 25 seconds between points.

== Schedule ==
This was the complete schedule of events on the 2019 calendar.

Key
Grand Slam
ATP Finals
ATP Tour Masters 1000
ATP Tour 500
ATP Tour 250
Team Events

=== January ===
| Week | Tournament | Champions | Runners-up | Semifinalists | Quarterfinalists |
|---|---|---|---|---|---|
| 31 Dec | Hopman Cup; Perth, Australia; ITF Mixed Team Championships; Hard (i) – 8 teams (RR) | Switzerland; 2–1 | Germany | Round robin (Group A) Australia; Spain; France | Round robin (Group B) Greece; Great Britain; United States |
| 31 Dec | Qatar Open; Doha, Qatar; ATP Tour 250; Hard – $1,416,205 – 32S/16Q/16D; Singles – Doubles | (Spain) Roberto Bautista Agut; 6–4, 3–6, 6–3 | (Czech Republic) Tomáš Berdych | (Serbia) Novak Djokovic (Italy) Marco Cecchinato | (Georgia (country)) Nikoloz Basilashvili (Switzerland) Stan Wawrinka (Serbia) Dušan Lajović (France) Pierre-Hugues Herbert |
| 31 Dec | Qatar Open; Doha, Qatar; ATP Tour 250; Hard – $1,416,205 – 32S/16Q/16D; Singles – Doubles | (Belgium) David Goffin (France) Pierre-Hugues Herbert; 5–7, 6–4, [10–4] | (Netherlands) Robin Haase (Netherlands) Matwé Middelkoop | (Serbia) Novak Djokovic (Italy) Marco Cecchinato | (Georgia (country)) Nikoloz Basilashvili (Switzerland) Stan Wawrinka (Serbia) Dušan Lajović (France) Pierre-Hugues Herbert |
| 31 Dec | Brisbane International; Brisbane, Australia; ATP Tour 250; Hard – $589,680 – 28S/16Q/16D; Singles – Doubles | (Japan) Kei Nishikori; 6–4, 3–6, 6–2 | (Russia) Daniil Medvedev | (France) Jo-Wilfried Tsonga (France) Jérémy Chardy | (Australia) Alex de Minaur (Canada) Milos Raonic (Japan) Yasutaka Uchiyama (Bulgaria) Grigor Dimitrov |
| 31 Dec | Brisbane International; Brisbane, Australia; ATP Tour 250; Hard – $589,680 – 28S/16Q/16D; Singles – Doubles | (New Zealand) Marcus Daniell (Netherlands) Wesley Koolhof; 6–4, 7–6^{(8–6)} | (United States) Rajeev Ram (United Kingdom) Joe Salisbury | (France) Jo-Wilfried Tsonga (France) Jérémy Chardy | (Australia) Alex de Minaur (Canada) Milos Raonic (Japan) Yasutaka Uchiyama (Bulgaria) Grigor Dimitrov |
| 31 Dec | Maharashtra Open; Pune, India; ATP Tour 250; Hard – $589,680 – 28S/16Q/16D; Singles – Doubles | (South Africa) Kevin Anderson; 7–6^{(7–4)}, 6–7^{(2–7)}, 7–6^{(7–5)} | (Croatia) Ivo Karlović | (France) Gilles Simon (Belgium) Steve Darcis | (Spain) Jaume Munar (France) Benoît Paire (Tunisia) Malek Jaziri (Latvia) Ernests Gulbis |
| 31 Dec | Maharashtra Open; Pune, India; ATP Tour 250; Hard – $589,680 – 28S/16Q/16D; Singles – Doubles | (India) Rohan Bopanna (India) Divij Sharan; 6–3, 6–4 | (United Kingdom) Luke Bambridge (United Kingdom) Jonny O'Mara | (France) Gilles Simon (Belgium) Steve Darcis | (Spain) Jaume Munar (France) Benoît Paire (Tunisia) Malek Jaziri (Latvia) Ernests Gulbis |
| 7 Jan | Sydney International; Sydney, Australia; ATP Tour 250; Hard – $589,680 – 28S/16Q/16D; Singles – Doubles | (Australia) Alex de Minaur; 7–5, 7–6^{(7–5)} | (Italy) Andreas Seppi | (Argentina) Diego Schwartzman (France) Gilles Simon | (Greece) Stefanos Tsitsipas (Japan) Yoshihito Nishioka (Australia) John Millman (Australia) Jordan Thompson |
| 7 Jan | Sydney International; Sydney, Australia; ATP Tour 250; Hard – $589,680 – 28S/16Q/16D; Singles – Doubles | (United Kingdom) Jamie Murray (Brazil) Bruno Soares; 6–4, 6–3 | (Colombia) Juan Sebastián Cabal (Colombia) Robert Farah | (Argentina) Diego Schwartzman (France) Gilles Simon | (Greece) Stefanos Tsitsipas (Japan) Yoshihito Nishioka (Australia) John Millman (Australia) Jordan Thompson |
| 7 Jan | Auckland Open; Auckland, New Zealand; ATP Tour 250; Hard – $589,680 – 28S/16Q/16D; Singles – Doubles | (United States) Tennys Sandgren; 6–4, 6–2 | (United Kingdom) Cameron Norrie | (Germany) Jan-Lennard Struff (Germany) Philipp Kohlschreiber | (United States) Taylor Fritz (Spain) Pablo Carreño Busta (Argentina) Leonardo Mayer (Italy) Fabio Fognini |
| 7 Jan | Auckland Open; Auckland, New Zealand; ATP Tour 250; Hard – $589,680 – 28S/16Q/16D; Singles – Doubles | (Japan) Ben McLachlan (Germany) Jan-Lennard Struff; 6–3, 6–4 | (South Africa) Raven Klaasen (New Zealand) Michael Venus | (Germany) Jan-Lennard Struff (Germany) Philipp Kohlschreiber | (United States) Taylor Fritz (Spain) Pablo Carreño Busta (Argentina) Leonardo Mayer (Italy) Fabio Fognini |
| 14 Jan; 21 Jan | Australian Open; Melbourne, Australia; Grand Slam; Hard – A$28,487,000; 128S/128Q/64D/32X; Singles – Doubles – Mixed doubles | (Serbia) Novak Djokovic; 6–3, 6–2, 6–3 | (Spain) Rafael Nadal | (France) Lucas Pouille (Greece) Stefanos Tsitsipas | (Japan) Kei Nishikori (Canada) Milos Raonic (Spain) Roberto Bautista Agut (United States) Frances Tiafoe |
| 14 Jan; 21 Jan | Australian Open; Melbourne, Australia; Grand Slam; Hard – A$28,487,000; 128S/128Q/64D/32X; Singles – Doubles – Mixed doubles | (France) Pierre-Hugues Herbert (France) Nicolas Mahut; 6–4, 7–6^{(7–1)} | (Finland) Henri Kontinen (Australia) John Peers | (France) Lucas Pouille (Greece) Stefanos Tsitsipas | (Japan) Kei Nishikori (Canada) Milos Raonic (Spain) Roberto Bautista Agut (United States) Frances Tiafoe |
| 14 Jan; 21 Jan | Australian Open; Melbourne, Australia; Grand Slam; Hard – A$28,487,000; 128S/128Q/64D/32X; Singles – Doubles – Mixed doubles | (Czech Republic) Barbora Krejčíková (United States) Rajeev Ram; 7–6^{(7–3)}, 6–1 | (Australia) Astra Sharma (Australia) John-Patrick Smith | (France) Lucas Pouille (Greece) Stefanos Tsitsipas | (Japan) Kei Nishikori (Canada) Milos Raonic (Spain) Roberto Bautista Agut (United States) Frances Tiafoe |
| 28 Jan | Davis Cup qualifying round Uberlândia, Brazil – clay (i); Tashkent, Uzbekistan – hard (i); Adelaide, Australia – hard Kolkata, India – grass Frankfurt, Germany – hard (i); Biel/Bienne, Switzerland – hard (i); Astana, Kazakhstan – hard (i); Ostrava, Czech Republic – hard (i); Bogotá, Colombia – clay (i); Salzburg, Austria – clay (i); Bratislava, Slovakia – clay (i); Guangzhou, China – hard | Qualifying round winners Belgium 3–1; Serbia 3–2; Australia 4–0; Italy 3–1; Germany 5–0; Russia 3–1; Kazakhstan 3–1; Netherlands 3–1; Colombia 4–0; Chile 3–2; Canada 3–2; Japan 3–2 | Qualifying round losers Brazil; Uzbekistan; Bosnia and Herzegovina; India; Hungary; Switzerland; Portugal; Czech Republic; Sweden; Austria; Slovakia; China | | |

=== February ===
| Week | Tournament | Champions | Runners-up | Semifinalists | Quarterfinalists |
|---|---|---|---|---|---|
| 4 Feb | Open Sud de France; Montpellier, France; ATP Tour 250; Hard (i) – €586,140 – 28S/16Q/16D; Singles – Doubles | (France) Jo-Wilfried Tsonga; 6–4, 6–2 | (France) Pierre-Hugues Herbert | (Moldova) Radu Albot (Czech Republic) Tomáš Berdych | (Cyprus) Marcos Baghdatis (France) Jérémy Chardy (Canada) Denis Shapovalov (Serbia) Filip Krajinović |
| 4 Feb | Open Sud de France; Montpellier, France; ATP Tour 250; Hard (i) – €586,140 – 28S/16Q/16D; Singles – Doubles | (Croatia) Ivan Dodig (France) Édouard Roger-Vasselin; 6–4, 6–3 | (France) Benjamin Bonzi (France) Antoine Hoang | (Moldova) Radu Albot (Czech Republic) Tomáš Berdych | (Cyprus) Marcos Baghdatis (France) Jérémy Chardy (Canada) Denis Shapovalov (Serbia) Filip Krajinović |
| 4 Feb | Sofia Open; Sofia, Bulgaria; ATP Tour 250; Hard (i) – €586,140 – 28S/16Q/16D; Singles – Doubles | (Russia) Daniil Medvedev; 6–4, 6–3 | (Hungary) Márton Fucsovics | (Italy) Matteo Berrettini (France) Gaël Monfils | (Spain) Fernando Verdasco (Spain) Roberto Bautista Agut (Slovakia) Martin Kližan (Greece) Stefanos Tsitsipas |
| 4 Feb | Sofia Open; Sofia, Bulgaria; ATP Tour 250; Hard (i) – €586,140 – 28S/16Q/16D; Singles – Doubles | (Croatia) Nikola Mektić (Austria) Jürgen Melzer; 6–2, 4–6, [10–2] | (Chinese Taipei) Hsieh Cheng-peng (Indonesia) Christopher Rungkat | (Italy) Matteo Berrettini (France) Gaël Monfils | (Spain) Fernando Verdasco (Spain) Roberto Bautista Agut (Slovakia) Martin Kližan (Greece) Stefanos Tsitsipas |
| 4 Feb | Córdoba Open; Córdoba, Argentina; ATP Tour 250; Clay (red) – $589,680 – 28S/16Q/16D; Singles – Doubles | (Argentina) Juan Ignacio Londero; 3–6, 7–5, 6–1 | (Argentina) Guido Pella | (Uruguay) Pablo Cuevas (Argentina) Federico Delbonis | (Slovenia) Aljaž Bedene (Argentina) Diego Schwartzman (Argentina) Pedro Cachin (Spain) Jaume Munar |
| 4 Feb | Córdoba Open; Córdoba, Argentina; ATP Tour 250; Clay (red) – $589,680 – 28S/16Q/16D; Singles – Doubles | (Czech Republic) Roman Jebavý (Argentina) Andrés Molteni; 6–4, 7–6^{(7–4)} | (Argentina) Máximo González (Argentina) Horacio Zeballos | (Uruguay) Pablo Cuevas (Argentina) Federico Delbonis | (Slovenia) Aljaž Bedene (Argentina) Diego Schwartzman (Argentina) Pedro Cachin (Spain) Jaume Munar |
| 11 Feb | Rotterdam Open; Rotterdam, Netherlands; ATP Tour 500; Hard (i) – €2,098,480 – 32S/16Q/16D; Singles – Doubles | (France) Gaël Monfils; 6–3, 1–6, 6–2 | (Switzerland) Stan Wawrinka | (Japan) Kei Nishikori (Russia) Daniil Medvedev | (Hungary) Márton Fucsovics (Canada) Denis Shapovalov (Bosnia and Herzegovina) Damir Džumhur (France) Jo-Wilfried Tsonga |
| 11 Feb | Rotterdam Open; Rotterdam, Netherlands; ATP Tour 500; Hard (i) – €2,098,480 – 32S/16Q/16D; Singles – Doubles | (France) Jérémy Chardy (Finland) Henri Kontinen; 7–6^{(7–5)}, 7–6^{(7–4)} | (Netherlands) Jean-Julien Rojer (Romania) Horia Tecău | (Japan) Kei Nishikori (Russia) Daniil Medvedev | (Hungary) Márton Fucsovics (Canada) Denis Shapovalov (Bosnia and Herzegovina) Damir Džumhur (France) Jo-Wilfried Tsonga |
| 11 Feb | New York Open; Uniondale, United States; ATP Tour 250; Hard (i) – $777,385 – 28S/16Q/16D; Singles – Doubles | (United States) Reilly Opelka; 6–1, 6–7^{(7–9)}, 7–6^{(9–7)} | (Canada) Brayden Schnur | (United States) John Isner (United States) Sam Querrey | (Australia) Jordan Thompson (Spain) Guillermo García López (Italy) Paolo Lorenzi (Chinese Taipei) Jason Jung |
| 11 Feb | New York Open; Uniondale, United States; ATP Tour 250; Hard (i) – $777,385 – 28S/16Q/16D; Singles – Doubles | (Germany) Kevin Krawietz (Germany) Andreas Mies; 6–4, 7–5 | (Mexico) Santiago González (Pakistan) Aisam-ul-Haq Qureshi | (United States) John Isner (United States) Sam Querrey | (Australia) Jordan Thompson (Spain) Guillermo García López (Italy) Paolo Lorenzi (Chinese Taipei) Jason Jung |
| 11 Feb | Argentina Open; Buenos Aires, Argentina; ATP Tour 250; Clay (red) – $673,135 – 28S/16Q/16D; Singles – Doubles | (Italy) Marco Cecchinato; 6–1, 6–2 | (Argentina) Diego Schwartzman | (Austria) Dominic Thiem (Argentina) Guido Pella | (Uruguay) Pablo Cuevas (Spain) Albert Ramos Viñolas (Spain) Roberto Carballés Baena (Spain) Jaume Munar |
| 11 Feb | Argentina Open; Buenos Aires, Argentina; ATP Tour 250; Clay (red) – $673,135 – 28S/16Q/16D; Singles – Doubles | (Argentina) Máximo González (Argentina) Horacio Zeballos; 6–1, 6–1 | (Argentina) Diego Schwartzman (Austria) Dominic Thiem | (Austria) Dominic Thiem (Argentina) Guido Pella | (Uruguay) Pablo Cuevas (Spain) Albert Ramos Viñolas (Spain) Roberto Carballés Baena (Spain) Jaume Munar |
| 18 Feb | Rio Open; Rio de Janeiro, Brazil; ATP Tour 500; Clay (red) – $1,937,740 – 32S/16Q/16D; Singles – Doubles | (Serbia) Laslo Đere; 6–3, 7–5 | (Canada) Félix Auger-Aliassime | (Slovenia) Aljaž Bedene (Uruguay) Pablo Cuevas | (Norway) Casper Ruud (Bolivia) Hugo Dellien (Spain) Albert Ramos Viñolas (Spain) Jaume Munar |
| 18 Feb | Rio Open; Rio de Janeiro, Brazil; ATP Tour 500; Clay (red) – $1,937,740 – 32S/16Q/16D; Singles – Doubles | (Argentina) Máximo González (Chile) Nicolás Jarry; 6–7^{(3–7)}, 6–3, [10–7] | (Brazil) Thomaz Bellucci (Brazil) Rogério Dutra Silva | (Slovenia) Aljaž Bedene (Uruguay) Pablo Cuevas | (Norway) Casper Ruud (Bolivia) Hugo Dellien (Spain) Albert Ramos Viñolas (Spain) Jaume Munar |
| 18 Feb | Open 13; Marseille, France; ATP Tour 250; Hard (i) – €744,010 – 28S/16Q/16D; Singles – Doubles | (Greece) Stefanos Tsitsipas; 7–5, 7–6^{(7–5)} | (Kazakhstan) Mikhail Kukushkin | (Belgium) David Goffin (France) Ugo Humbert | (Ukraine) Sergiy Stakhovsky (France) Gilles Simon (Russia) Andrey Rublev (Germany) Matthias Bachinger |
| 18 Feb | Open 13; Marseille, France; ATP Tour 250; Hard (i) – €744,010 – 28S/16Q/16D; Singles – Doubles | (France) Jérémy Chardy (France) Fabrice Martin; 6–3, 6–7^{(4–7)}, [10–3] | (Japan) Ben McLachlan (Netherlands) Matwé Middelkoop | (Belgium) David Goffin (France) Ugo Humbert | (Ukraine) Sergiy Stakhovsky (France) Gilles Simon (Russia) Andrey Rublev (Germany) Matthias Bachinger |
| 18 Feb | Delray Beach Open; Delray Beach, United States; ATP Tour 250; Hard – $651,215 – 32S/16Q/16D; Singles – Doubles | (Moldova) Radu Albot; 3–6, 6–3, 7–6^{(9–7)} | (United Kingdom) Dan Evans | (United States) Mackenzie McDonald (United States) John Isner | (Argentina) Juan Martín del Potro (United States) Steve Johnson (Italy) Andreas Seppi (France) Adrian Mannarino |
| 18 Feb | Delray Beach Open; Delray Beach, United States; ATP Tour 250; Hard – $651,215 – 32S/16Q/16D; Singles – Doubles | (United States) Bob Bryan (United States) Mike Bryan; 7–6^{(7–5)}, 6–4 | (United Kingdom) Ken Skupski (United Kingdom) Neal Skupski | (United States) Mackenzie McDonald (United States) John Isner | (Argentina) Juan Martín del Potro (United States) Steve Johnson (Italy) Andreas Seppi (France) Adrian Mannarino |
| 25 Feb | Dubai Tennis Championships; Dubai, United Arab Emirates; ATP Tour 500; Hard – $2,887,895 – 32S/16Q/16D; Singles – Doubles | (Switzerland) Roger Federer; 6–4, 6–4 | (Greece) Stefanos Tsitsipas | (France) Gaël Monfils (Croatia) Borna Ćorić | (Poland) Hubert Hurkacz (Lithuania) Ričardas Berankis (Georgia (country)) Nikoloz Basilashvili (Hungary) Márton Fucsovics |
| 25 Feb | Dubai Tennis Championships; Dubai, United Arab Emirates; ATP Tour 500; Hard – $2,887,895 – 32S/16Q/16D; Singles – Doubles | (United States) Rajeev Ram (United Kingdom) Joe Salisbury; 7–6^{(7–4)}, 6–3 | (Japan) Ben McLachlan (Germany) Jan-Lennard Struff | (France) Gaël Monfils (Croatia) Borna Ćorić | (Poland) Hubert Hurkacz (Lithuania) Ričardas Berankis (Georgia (country)) Nikoloz Basilashvili (Hungary) Márton Fucsovics |
| 25 Feb | Mexican Open; Acapulco, Mexico; ATP Tour 500; Hard – $1,931,110 – 32S/16Q/16D; Singles – Doubles | (Australia) Nick Kyrgios; 6–3, 6–4 | (Germany) Alexander Zverev | (United States) John Isner (United Kingdom) Cameron Norrie | (Switzerland) Stan Wawrinka (Australia) John Millman (United States) Mackenzie McDonald (Australia) Alex de Minaur |
| 25 Feb | Mexican Open; Acapulco, Mexico; ATP Tour 500; Hard – $1,931,110 – 32S/16Q/16D; Singles – Doubles | (Germany) Alexander Zverev (Germany) Mischa Zverev; 2–6, 7–6^{(7–4)}, [10–5] | (United States) Austin Krajicek (New Zealand) Artem Sitak | (United States) John Isner (United Kingdom) Cameron Norrie | (Switzerland) Stan Wawrinka (Australia) John Millman (United States) Mackenzie McDonald (Australia) Alex de Minaur |
| 25 Feb | Brasil Open; São Paulo, Brazil; ATP Tour 250; Clay (red) (i) – $618,810 – 28S/16Q/16D; Singles – Doubles | (Argentina) Guido Pella; 7–5, 6–3 | (Chile) Cristian Garín | (Norway) Casper Ruud (Serbia) Laslo Đere | (Bolivia) Hugo Dellien (Argentina) Leonardo Mayer (Argentina) Marco Trungelliti (Canada) Félix Auger-Aliassime |
| 25 Feb | Brasil Open; São Paulo, Brazil; ATP Tour 250; Clay (red) (i) – $618,810 – 28S/16Q/16D; Singles – Doubles | (Argentina) Federico Delbonis (Argentina) Máximo González; 6–4, 6–3 | (United Kingdom) Luke Bambridge (United Kingdom) Jonny O'Mara | (Norway) Casper Ruud (Serbia) Laslo Đere | (Bolivia) Hugo Dellien (Argentina) Leonardo Mayer (Argentina) Marco Trungelliti (Canada) Félix Auger-Aliassime |

=== March ===
| Week | Tournament | Champions | Runners-up | Semifinalists | Quarterfinalists |
|---|---|---|---|---|---|
| 4 Mar; 11 Mar | Indian Wells Open; Indian Wells, United States; ATP Tour Masters 1000; Hard – $8,359,455 – 96S/48Q/32D; Singles – Doubles | (Austria) Dominic Thiem; 3–6, 6–3, 7–5 | (Switzerland) Roger Federer | (Canada) Milos Raonic (Spain) Rafael Nadal | (France) Gaël Monfils (Serbia) Miomir Kecmanović (Poland) Hubert Hurkacz (Russia) Karen Khachanov |
| 4 Mar; 11 Mar | Indian Wells Open; Indian Wells, United States; ATP Tour Masters 1000; Hard – $8,359,455 – 96S/48Q/32D; Singles – Doubles | (Croatia) Nikola Mektić (Argentina) Horacio Zeballos; 4–6, 6–4, [10–3] | (Poland) Łukasz Kubot (Brazil) Marcelo Melo | (Canada) Milos Raonic (Spain) Rafael Nadal | (France) Gaël Monfils (Serbia) Miomir Kecmanović (Poland) Hubert Hurkacz (Russia) Karen Khachanov |
| 18 Mar; 25 Mar | Miami Open; Key Biscayne, United States; ATP Tour Masters 1000; Hard – $8,359,455 – 96S/48Q/32D; Singles – Doubles | (Switzerland) Roger Federer; 6–1, 6–4 | (United States) John Isner | (Canada) Félix Auger-Aliassime (Canada) Denis Shapovalov | (Spain) Roberto Bautista Agut (Croatia) Borna Ćorić (South Africa) Kevin Anderson (United States) Frances Tiafoe |
| 18 Mar; 25 Mar | Miami Open; Key Biscayne, United States; ATP Tour Masters 1000; Hard – $8,359,455 – 96S/48Q/32D; Singles – Doubles | (United States) Bob Bryan (United States) Mike Bryan; 7–5, 7–6^{(10–8)} | (Netherlands) Wesley Koolhof (Greece) Stefanos Tsitsipas | (Canada) Félix Auger-Aliassime (Canada) Denis Shapovalov | (Spain) Roberto Bautista Agut (Croatia) Borna Ćorić (South Africa) Kevin Anderson (United States) Frances Tiafoe |

=== April ===
| Week | Tournament | Champions | Runners-up | Semifinalists | Quarterfinalists |
|---|---|---|---|---|---|
| 1 Apr | No tournaments scheduled. | | | | |
| 8 Apr | U.S. Men's Clay Court Championships; Houston, United States; ATP Tour 250 $652,245 − Clay (maroon) − 28S/16Q/16D; Singles − Doubles | (Chile) Cristian Garín; 7–6^{(7–4)}, 4–6, 6–3 | (Norway) Casper Ruud | (Colombia) Daniel Elahi Galán (United States) Sam Querrey | (Australia) Jordan Thompson (Spain) Marcel Granollers (Serbia) Janko Tipsarević (Switzerland) Henri Laaksonen |
| 8 Apr | U.S. Men's Clay Court Championships; Houston, United States; ATP Tour 250 $652,245 − Clay (maroon) − 28S/16Q/16D; Singles − Doubles | (Mexico) Santiago González (Pakistan) Aisam-ul-Haq Qureshi; 3–6, 6–4, [10–6] | (United Kingdom) Ken Skupski (United Kingdom) Neal Skupski | (Colombia) Daniel Elahi Galán (United States) Sam Querrey | (Australia) Jordan Thompson (Spain) Marcel Granollers (Serbia) Janko Tipsarević (Switzerland) Henri Laaksonen |
| 8 Apr | Grand Prix Hassan II; Marrakesh, Morocco; ATP Tour 250 €586,140 − Clay (red) − 32S/16Q/16D; Singles − Doubles | (France) Benoît Paire; 6–2, 6–3 | (Spain) Pablo Andújar | (France) Jo-Wilfried Tsonga (France) Gilles Simon | (Spain) Jaume Munar (Italy) Lorenzo Sonego (Japan) Taro Daniel (Czech Republic) Jiří Veselý |
| 8 Apr | Grand Prix Hassan II; Marrakesh, Morocco; ATP Tour 250 €586,140 − Clay (red) − 32S/16Q/16D; Singles − Doubles | (Austria) Jürgen Melzer (Croatia) Franko Škugor; 6–4, 7–6^{(8–6)} | (Netherlands) Matwé Middelkoop (Denmark) Frederik Nielsen | (France) Jo-Wilfried Tsonga (France) Gilles Simon | (Spain) Jaume Munar (Italy) Lorenzo Sonego (Japan) Taro Daniel (Czech Republic) Jiří Veselý |
| 15 Apr | Monte-Carlo Masters; Roquebrune-Cap-Martin, France; ATP Tour Masters 1000; Clay (red) – €5,207,405 – 56S/28Q/32D; Singles − Doubles | (Italy) Fabio Fognini; 6–3, 6–4 | (Serbia) Dušan Lajović | (Russia) Daniil Medvedev (Spain) Rafael Nadal | (Serbia) Novak Djokovic (Italy) Lorenzo Sonego (Croatia) Borna Ćorić (Argentina) Guido Pella |
| 15 Apr | Monte-Carlo Masters; Roquebrune-Cap-Martin, France; ATP Tour Masters 1000; Clay (red) – €5,207,405 – 56S/28Q/32D; Singles − Doubles | (Croatia) Nikola Mektić (Croatia) Franko Škugor; 6–7^{(3–7)}, 7–6^{(7–3)}, [11–9] | (Netherlands) Robin Haase (Netherlands) Wesley Koolhof | (Russia) Daniil Medvedev (Spain) Rafael Nadal | (Serbia) Novak Djokovic (Italy) Lorenzo Sonego (Croatia) Borna Ćorić (Argentina) Guido Pella |
| 22 Apr | Barcelona Open; Barcelona, Spain; ATP Tour 500 €2,746,455 − Clay (red) − 48S/24Q/16D; Singles − Doubles | (Austria) Dominic Thiem; 6–4, 6–0 | (Russia) Daniil Medvedev | (Spain) Rafael Nadal (Japan) Kei Nishikori | (Germany) Jan-Lennard Struff (Argentina) Guido Pella (Spain) Roberto Carballés Baena (Chile) Nicolás Jarry |
| 22 Apr | Barcelona Open; Barcelona, Spain; ATP Tour 500 €2,746,455 − Clay (red) − 48S/24Q/16D; Singles − Doubles | (Colombia) Juan Sebastián Cabal (Colombia) Robert Farah; 6–4, 7–6^{(7–4)} | (United Kingdom) Jamie Murray (Brazil) Bruno Soares | (Spain) Rafael Nadal (Japan) Kei Nishikori | (Germany) Jan-Lennard Struff (Argentina) Guido Pella (Spain) Roberto Carballés Baena (Chile) Nicolás Jarry |
| 22 Apr | Hungarian Open; Budapest, Hungary; ATP Tour 250 €586,140 − Clay (red) − 28S/16Q/16D; Singles − Doubles | (Italy) Matteo Berrettini; 4–6, 6–3, 6–1 | (Serbia) Filip Krajinović | (Serbia) Laslo Đere (France) Pierre-Hugues Herbert | (Uruguay) Pablo Cuevas (Georgia (country)) Nikoloz Basilashvili (Hungary) Attila Balázs (Croatia) Borna Ćorić |
| 22 Apr | Hungarian Open; Budapest, Hungary; ATP Tour 250 €586,140 − Clay (red) − 28S/16Q/16D; Singles − Doubles | (United Kingdom) Ken Skupski (United Kingdom) Neal Skupski; 6–3, 6–4 | (New Zealand) Marcus Daniell (Netherlands) Wesley Koolhof | (Serbia) Laslo Đere (France) Pierre-Hugues Herbert | (Uruguay) Pablo Cuevas (Georgia (country)) Nikoloz Basilashvili (Hungary) Attila Balázs (Croatia) Borna Ćorić |
| 29 Apr | Estoril Open; Cascais, Portugal; ATP Tour 250 €586,140 − Clay (red) − 28S/16Q/16D; Singles − Doubles | (Greece) Stefanos Tsitsipas; 6–3, 7–6^{(7–4)} | (Uruguay) Pablo Cuevas | (Belgium) David Goffin (Spain) Alejandro Davidovich Fokina | (Portugal) João Domingues (Tunisia) Malek Jaziri (France) Gaël Monfils (United States) Frances Tiafoe |
| 29 Apr | Estoril Open; Cascais, Portugal; ATP Tour 250 €586,140 − Clay (red) − 28S/16Q/16D; Singles − Doubles | (France) Jérémy Chardy (France) Fabrice Martin; 7–5, 7–6^{(7–3)} | (United Kingdom) Luke Bambridge (United Kingdom) Jonny O'Mara | (Belgium) David Goffin (Spain) Alejandro Davidovich Fokina | (Portugal) João Domingues (Tunisia) Malek Jaziri (France) Gaël Monfils (United States) Frances Tiafoe |
| 29 Apr | Bavarian International Tennis Championships; Munich, Germany; ATP Tour 250 €586,140 − Clay (red) − 28S/16Q/16D; Singles − Doubles | (Chile) Cristian Garín; 6–1, 3–6, 7–6^{(7–1)} | (Italy) Matteo Berrettini | (Italy) Marco Cecchinato (Spain) Roberto Bautista Agut | (Germany) Alexander Zverev (Hungary) Márton Fucsovics (Argentina) Guido Pella (Germany) Philipp Kohlschreiber |
| 29 Apr | Bavarian International Tennis Championships; Munich, Germany; ATP Tour 250 €586,140 − Clay (red) − 28S/16Q/16D; Singles − Doubles | (Denmark) Frederik Nielsen (Germany) Tim Pütz; 6–4, 6–2 | (Brazil) Marcelo Demoliner (India) Divij Sharan | (Italy) Marco Cecchinato (Spain) Roberto Bautista Agut | (Germany) Alexander Zverev (Hungary) Márton Fucsovics (Argentina) Guido Pella (Germany) Philipp Kohlschreiber |

=== May ===
| Week | Tournament | Champions | Runners-up | Semifinalists | Quarterfinalists |
|---|---|---|---|---|---|
| 6 May | Madrid Open; Madrid, Spain; ATP Tour Masters 1000 €6,536,160 − Clay (red) − 56S/28Q/32D; Singles − Doubles | (Serbia) Novak Djokovic; 6–3, 6–4 | (Greece) Stefanos Tsitsipas | (Austria) Dominic Thiem (Spain) Rafael Nadal | (Croatia) Marin Čilić (Switzerland) Roger Federer (Germany) Alexander Zverev (Switzerland) Stan Wawrinka |
| 6 May | Madrid Open; Madrid, Spain; ATP Tour Masters 1000 €6,536,160 − Clay (red) − 56S/28Q/32D; Singles − Doubles | (Netherlands) Jean-Julien Rojer (Romania) Horia Tecău; 6–2, 6–3 | (Argentina) Diego Schwartzman (Austria) Dominic Thiem | (Austria) Dominic Thiem (Spain) Rafael Nadal | (Croatia) Marin Čilić (Switzerland) Roger Federer (Germany) Alexander Zverev (Switzerland) Stan Wawrinka |
| 13 May | Italian Open; Rome, Italy; ATP Tour Masters 1000 €5,207,405 − Clay (red) − 56S/28Q/32D; Singles − Doubles | (Spain) Rafael Nadal; 6–0, 4–6, 6–1 | (Serbia) Novak Djokovic | (Argentina) Diego Schwartzman (Greece) Stefanos Tsitsipas | (Argentina) Juan Martín del Potro (Japan) Kei Nishikori (Switzerland) Roger Federer (Spain) Fernando Verdasco |
| 13 May | Italian Open; Rome, Italy; ATP Tour Masters 1000 €5,207,405 − Clay (red) − 56S/28Q/32D; Singles − Doubles | (Colombia) Juan Sebastián Cabal (Colombia) Robert Farah; 6–1, 6–3 | (South Africa) Raven Klaasen (New Zealand) Michael Venus | (Argentina) Diego Schwartzman (Greece) Stefanos Tsitsipas | (Argentina) Juan Martín del Potro (Japan) Kei Nishikori (Switzerland) Roger Federer (Spain) Fernando Verdasco |
| 20 May | Geneva Open; Geneva, Switzerland; ATP Tour 250 €586,140 − Clay (red) − 28S/16Q/16D; Singles – Doubles | (Germany) Alexander Zverev; 6–3, 3–6, 7–6^{(10–8)} | (Chile) Nicolás Jarry | (Argentina) Federico Delbonis (Moldova) Radu Albot | (Bolivia) Hugo Dellien (Spain) Albert Ramos Viñolas (Japan) Taro Daniel (Bosnia and Herzegovina) Damir Džumhur |
| 20 May | Geneva Open; Geneva, Switzerland; ATP Tour 250 €586,140 − Clay (red) − 28S/16Q/16D; Singles – Doubles | (Austria) Oliver Marach (Croatia) Mate Pavić; 6–4, 6–4 | (Australia) Matthew Ebden (Sweden) Robert Lindstedt | (Argentina) Federico Delbonis (Moldova) Radu Albot | (Bolivia) Hugo Dellien (Spain) Albert Ramos Viñolas (Japan) Taro Daniel (Bosnia and Herzegovina) Damir Džumhur |
| 20 May | Lyon Open; Lyon, France; ATP Tour 250 €586,140 − Clay (red) − 28S/16Q/16D; Singles – Doubles | (France) Benoît Paire; 6–4, 6–3 | (Canada) Félix Auger-Aliassime | (Georgia (country)) Nikoloz Basilashvili (United States) Taylor Fritz | (France) Jo-Wilfried Tsonga (United States) Steve Johnson (Canada) Denis Shapovalov (Spain) Roberto Bautista Agut |
| 20 May | Lyon Open; Lyon, France; ATP Tour 250 €586,140 − Clay (red) − 28S/16Q/16D; Singles – Doubles | (Croatia) Ivan Dodig (France) Édouard Roger-Vasselin; 6–4, 6–3 | (United Kingdom) Ken Skupski (United Kingdom) Neal Skupski | (Georgia (country)) Nikoloz Basilashvili (United States) Taylor Fritz | (France) Jo-Wilfried Tsonga (United States) Steve Johnson (Canada) Denis Shapovalov (Spain) Roberto Bautista Agut |
| 27 May; 3 Jun | French Open; Paris, France; Grand Slam €20,060,000 − Clay (red); 128S/128Q/64D/32X; Singles – Doubles – Mixed doubles | (Spain) Rafael Nadal; 6–3, 5–7, 6–1, 6–1 | (Austria) Dominic Thiem | (Serbia) Novak Djokovic (Switzerland) Roger Federer | (Germany) Alexander Zverev (Russia) Karen Khachanov (Switzerland) Stan Wawrinka (Japan) Kei Nishikori |
| 27 May; 3 Jun | French Open; Paris, France; Grand Slam €20,060,000 − Clay (red); 128S/128Q/64D/32X; Singles – Doubles – Mixed doubles | (Germany) Kevin Krawietz (Germany) Andreas Mies; 6–2, 7–6^{(7–3)} | (France) Jérémy Chardy (France) Fabrice Martin | (Serbia) Novak Djokovic (Switzerland) Roger Federer | (Germany) Alexander Zverev (Russia) Karen Khachanov (Switzerland) Stan Wawrinka (Japan) Kei Nishikori |
| 27 May; 3 Jun | French Open; Paris, France; Grand Slam €20,060,000 − Clay (red); 128S/128Q/64D/32X; Singles – Doubles – Mixed doubles | (Chinese Taipei) Latisha Chan (Croatia) Ivan Dodig; 6–1, 7–6^{(7–5)} | (Canada) Gabriela Dabrowski (Croatia) Mate Pavić | (Serbia) Novak Djokovic (Switzerland) Roger Federer | (Germany) Alexander Zverev (Russia) Karen Khachanov (Switzerland) Stan Wawrinka (Japan) Kei Nishikori |

=== June ===
| Week | Tournament | Champions | Runners-up | Semifinalists | Quarterfinalists |
|---|---|---|---|---|---|
| 10 Jun | MercedesCup; Stuttgart, Germany; ATP Tour 250 €754,540 − Grass − 28S/16Q/16D; Singles − Doubles | (Italy) Matteo Berrettini; 6–4, 7–6^{(13–11)} | (Canada) Félix Auger-Aliassime | (Canada) Milos Raonic (Germany) Jan-Lennard Struff | (Germany) Dustin Brown (Hungary) Márton Fucsovics (France) Lucas Pouille (United States) Denis Kudla |
| 10 Jun | MercedesCup; Stuttgart, Germany; ATP Tour 250 €754,540 − Grass − 28S/16Q/16D; Singles − Doubles | (Australia) John Peers (Brazil) Bruno Soares; 7–5, 6–3 | (India) Rohan Bopanna (Canada) Denis Shapovalov | (Canada) Milos Raonic (Germany) Jan-Lennard Struff | (Germany) Dustin Brown (Hungary) Márton Fucsovics (France) Lucas Pouille (United States) Denis Kudla |
| 10 Jun | Rosmalen Grass Court Championships; Rosmalen, Netherlands; ATP Tour 250 €711,275 − Grass − 28S/16Q/16D; Singles − Doubles | (France) Adrian Mannarino; 7–6^{(9–7)}, 6–3 | (Australia) Jordan Thompson | (France) Richard Gasquet (Croatia) Borna Ćorić | (Chile) Nicolás Jarry (Australia) Alex de Minaur (Belgium) David Goffin (Chile) Cristian Garín |
| 10 Jun | Rosmalen Grass Court Championships; Rosmalen, Netherlands; ATP Tour 250 €711,275 − Grass − 28S/16Q/16D; Singles − Doubles | (United Kingdom) Dominic Inglot (United States) Austin Krajicek; 6–4, 4–6, [10–4] | (New Zealand) Marcus Daniell (Netherlands) Wesley Koolhof | (France) Richard Gasquet (Croatia) Borna Ćorić | (Chile) Nicolás Jarry (Australia) Alex de Minaur (Belgium) David Goffin (Chile) Cristian Garín |
| 17 Jun | Halle Open; Halle, Germany; ATP Tour 500 €2,219,150 − Grass − 32S/16Q/16D; Singles − Doubles | (Switzerland) Roger Federer; 7–6^{(7–2)}, 6–1 | (Belgium) David Goffin | (France) Pierre-Hugues Herbert (Italy) Matteo Berrettini | (Spain) Roberto Bautista Agut (Croatia) Borna Ćorić (Russia) Karen Khachanov (Germany) Alexander Zverev |
| 17 Jun | Halle Open; Halle, Germany; ATP Tour 500 €2,219,150 − Grass − 32S/16Q/16D; Singles − Doubles | (South Africa) Raven Klaasen (New Zealand) Michael Venus; 4–6, 6–3, [10–4] | (Poland) Łukasz Kubot (Brazil) Marcelo Melo | (France) Pierre-Hugues Herbert (Italy) Matteo Berrettini | (Spain) Roberto Bautista Agut (Croatia) Borna Ćorić (Russia) Karen Khachanov (Germany) Alexander Zverev |
| 17 Jun | Queen's Club Championships; London, United Kingdom; ATP Tour 500 €2,219,150 − Grass − 32S/16Q/16D; Singles − Doubles | (Spain) Feliciano López; 6–2, 6–7^{(4–7)}, 7–6^{(7–2)} | (France) Gilles Simon | (Canada) Félix Auger-Aliassime (Russia) Daniil Medvedev | (Greece) Stefanos Tsitsipas (Canada) Milos Raonic (Argentina) Diego Schwartzman (France) Nicolas Mahut |
| 17 Jun | Queen's Club Championships; London, United Kingdom; ATP Tour 500 €2,219,150 − Grass − 32S/16Q/16D; Singles − Doubles | (Spain) Feliciano López (United Kingdom) Andy Murray; 7–6^{(8–6)}, 5–7, [10–5] | (United States) Rajeev Ram (United Kingdom) Joe Salisbury | (Canada) Félix Auger-Aliassime (Russia) Daniil Medvedev | (Greece) Stefanos Tsitsipas (Canada) Milos Raonic (Argentina) Diego Schwartzman (France) Nicolas Mahut |
| 24 Jun | Eastbourne International; Eastbourne, United Kingdom; ATP Tour 250 €745,880 − Grass − 28S/16Q/16D; Singles − Doubles | (United States) Taylor Fritz; 6–3, 6–4 | (United States) Sam Querrey | (United Kingdom) Kyle Edmund (Italy) Thomas Fabbiano | (Poland) Hubert Hurkacz (United Kingdom) Dan Evans (Spain) Fernando Verdasco (France) Gilles Simon |
| 24 Jun | Eastbourne International; Eastbourne, United Kingdom; ATP Tour 250 €745,880 − Grass − 28S/16Q/16D; Singles − Doubles | (Colombia) Juan Sebastián Cabal (Colombia) Robert Farah; 3–6, 7–6^{(7–4)}, [10–6] | (Argentina) Máximo González (Argentina) Horacio Zeballos | (United Kingdom) Kyle Edmund (Italy) Thomas Fabbiano | (Poland) Hubert Hurkacz (United Kingdom) Dan Evans (Spain) Fernando Verdasco (France) Gilles Simon |
| 24 Jun | Antalya Open; Antalya, Turkey; ATP Tour 250; Grass – €507,490 – 28S/16Q/16D; Singles – Doubles | (Italy) Lorenzo Sonego; 6–7^{(5–7)}, 7–6^{(7–5)}, 6–1 | (Serbia) Miomir Kecmanović | (Australia) Jordan Thompson (Spain) Pablo Carreño Busta | (Serbia) Viktor Troicki (Bosnia and Herzegovina) Damir Džumhur (Australia) Bernard Tomic (France) Adrian Mannarino |
| 24 Jun | Antalya Open; Antalya, Turkey; ATP Tour 250; Grass – €507,490 – 28S/16Q/16D; Singles – Doubles | (Israel) Jonathan Erlich (New Zealand) Artem Sitak; 6–3, 6–4 | (Croatia) Ivan Dodig (Slovakia) Filip Polášek | (Australia) Jordan Thompson (Spain) Pablo Carreño Busta | (Serbia) Viktor Troicki (Bosnia and Herzegovina) Damir Džumhur (Australia) Bernard Tomic (France) Adrian Mannarino |

=== July ===
| Week | Tournament | Champions | Runners-up | Semifinalists | Quarterfinalists |
|---|---|---|---|---|---|
| 1 Jul; 8 Jul | Wimbledon; London, United Kingdom; Grand Slam; Grass – £17,769,000; 128S/128Q/64D/48X; Singles – Doubles – Mixed doubles | (Serbia) Novak Djokovic; 7–6^{(7–5)}, 1–6, 7–6^{(7–4)}, 4–6, 13–12^{(7–3)} | (Switzerland) Roger Federer | (Spain) Roberto Bautista Agut (Spain) Rafael Nadal | (Belgium) David Goffin (Argentina) Guido Pella (United States) Sam Querrey (Japan) Kei Nishikori |
| 1 Jul; 8 Jul | Wimbledon; London, United Kingdom; Grand Slam; Grass – £17,769,000; 128S/128Q/64D/48X; Singles – Doubles – Mixed doubles | (Colombia) Juan Sebastián Cabal (Colombia) Robert Farah 6–7^{(5–7)}, 7–6^{(7–5)}, 7–6^{(8–6)}, 6–7^{(5–7)}, 6–3 | (France) Nicolas Mahut (France) Édouard Roger-Vasselin | (Spain) Roberto Bautista Agut (Spain) Rafael Nadal | (Belgium) David Goffin (Argentina) Guido Pella (United States) Sam Querrey (Japan) Kei Nishikori |
| 1 Jul; 8 Jul | Wimbledon; London, United Kingdom; Grand Slam; Grass – £17,769,000; 128S/128Q/64D/48X; Singles – Doubles – Mixed doubles | (Croatia) Ivan Dodig (Chinese Taipei) Latisha Chan; 6–2, 6–3 | (Sweden) Robert Lindstedt (Latvia) Jeļena Ostapenko | (Spain) Roberto Bautista Agut (Spain) Rafael Nadal | (Belgium) David Goffin (Argentina) Guido Pella (United States) Sam Querrey (Japan) Kei Nishikori |
| 15 Jul | Hall of Fame Open; Newport, United States; ATP Tour 250 $652,245 − Grass − 28S/16Q/16D; Singles − Doubles | (United States) John Isner; 7–6^{(7–2)}, 6–3 | (Kazakhstan) Alexander Bublik | (France) Ugo Humbert (Spain) Marcel Granollers | (Australia) Matthew Ebden (Belarus) Ilya Ivashka (Germany) Mischa Zverev (United States) Tennys Sandgren |
| 15 Jul | Hall of Fame Open; Newport, United States; ATP Tour 250 $652,245 − Grass − 28S/16Q/16D; Singles − Doubles | (Spain) Marcel Granollers (Ukraine) Sergiy Stakhovsky; 6–7^{(10–12)}, 6–4, [13–11] | (El Salvador) Marcelo Arévalo (Mexico) Miguel Ángel Reyes-Varela | (France) Ugo Humbert (Spain) Marcel Granollers | (Australia) Matthew Ebden (Belarus) Ilya Ivashka (Germany) Mischa Zverev (United States) Tennys Sandgren |
| 15 Jul | Swedish Open; Båstad, Sweden; ATP Tour 250 €586,140 − Clay (red) − 28S/16Q/16D; Singles − Doubles | (Chile) Nicolás Jarry; 7–6^{(9–7)}, 6–4 | (Argentina) Juan Ignacio Londero | (Argentina) Federico Delbonis (Spain) Albert Ramos Viñolas | (France) Jérémy Chardy (Portugal) João Sousa (France) Richard Gasquet (Spain) Roberto Carballés Baena |
| 15 Jul | Swedish Open; Båstad, Sweden; ATP Tour 250 €586,140 − Clay (red) − 28S/16Q/16D; Singles − Doubles | (Belgium) Sander Gillé (Belgium) Joran Vliegen; 6–7^{(5–7)}, 7–5, [10–5] | (Argentina) Federico Delbonis (Argentina) Horacio Zeballos | (Argentina) Federico Delbonis (Spain) Albert Ramos Viñolas | (France) Jérémy Chardy (Portugal) João Sousa (France) Richard Gasquet (Spain) Roberto Carballés Baena |
| 15 Jul | Croatia Open; Umag, Croatia; ATP Tour 250 €586,140 − Clay (red) − 28S/16Q/16D; Singles − Doubles | (Serbia) Dušan Lajović; 7–5, 7–5 | (Hungary) Attila Balázs | (Serbia) Laslo Đere (Italy) Salvatore Caruso | (Italy) Stefano Travaglia (Argentina) Leonardo Mayer (Slovenia) Aljaž Bedene (Argentina) Facundo Bagnis |
| 15 Jul | Croatia Open; Umag, Croatia; ATP Tour 250 €586,140 − Clay (red) − 28S/16Q/16D; Singles − Doubles | (Netherlands) Robin Haase (Austria) Philipp Oswald; 7–5, 6–7^{(2–7)}, [14–12] | (Austria) Oliver Marach (Austria) Jürgen Melzer | (Serbia) Laslo Đere (Italy) Salvatore Caruso | (Italy) Stefano Travaglia (Argentina) Leonardo Mayer (Slovenia) Aljaž Bedene (Argentina) Facundo Bagnis |
| 22 Jul | Hamburg Open; Hamburg, Germany; ATP Tour 500 €1,855,490 − Clay (red) − 32S/16Q/16D; Singles – Doubles | (Georgia (country)) Nikoloz Basilashvili; 7–5, 4–6, 6–3 | (Russia) Andrey Rublev | (Spain) Pablo Carreño Busta (Germany) Alexander Zverev | (Austria) Dominic Thiem (Italy) Fabio Fognini (France) Jérémy Chardy (Serbia) Filip Krajinović |
| 22 Jul | Hamburg Open; Hamburg, Germany; ATP Tour 500 €1,855,490 − Clay (red) − 32S/16Q/16D; Singles – Doubles | (Austria) Oliver Marach (Austria) Jürgen Melzer; 6–2, 7–6^{(7–3)} | (Netherlands) Robin Haase (Netherlands) Wesley Koolhof | (Spain) Pablo Carreño Busta (Germany) Alexander Zverev | (Austria) Dominic Thiem (Italy) Fabio Fognini (France) Jérémy Chardy (Serbia) Filip Krajinović |
| 22 Jul | Atlanta Open; Atlanta, United States; ATP Tour 250 $777,385 − Hard − 28S/16Q/16D; Singles – Doubles | (Australia) Alex de Minaur; 6–3, 7–6^{(7–2)} | (United States) Taylor Fritz | (United States) Reilly Opelka (United Kingdom) Cameron Norrie | (United Kingdom) Dan Evans (Australia) Bernard Tomic (Australia) Alexei Popyrin (Serbia) Miomir Kecmanović |
| 22 Jul | Atlanta Open; Atlanta, United States; ATP Tour 250 $777,385 − Hard − 28S/16Q/16D; Singles – Doubles | (United Kingdom) Dominic Inglot (United States) Austin Krajicek; 6–4, 6–7^{(5–7)}, [11–9] | (United States) Bob Bryan (United States) Mike Bryan | (United States) Reilly Opelka (United Kingdom) Cameron Norrie | (United Kingdom) Dan Evans (Australia) Bernard Tomic (Australia) Alexei Popyrin (Serbia) Miomir Kecmanović |
| 22 Jul | Swiss Open; Gstaad, Switzerland; ATP Tour 250 €586,140 − Clay (red) − 28S/16Q/16D; Singles – Doubles | (Spain) Albert Ramos Viñolas; 6–3, 6–2 | (Germany) Cedrik-Marcel Stebe | (Portugal) João Sousa (Spain) Pablo Andújar | (Spain) Roberto Bautista Agut (Italy) Thomas Fabbiano (Serbia) Dušan Lajović (Spain) Roberto Carballés Baena |
| 22 Jul | Swiss Open; Gstaad, Switzerland; ATP Tour 250 €586,140 − Clay (red) − 28S/16Q/16D; Singles – Doubles | (Belgium) Sander Gillé (Belgium) Joran Vliegen; 6–4, 6–3 | (Austria) Philipp Oswald (Slovakia) Filip Polášek | (Portugal) João Sousa (Spain) Pablo Andújar | (Spain) Roberto Bautista Agut (Italy) Thomas Fabbiano (Serbia) Dušan Lajović (Spain) Roberto Carballés Baena |
| 29 Jul | Washington Open; Washington, D.C., United States; ATP Tour 500 $2,046,340 − Hard − 48S/16Q/16D; Singles – Doubles | (Australia) Nick Kyrgios; 7–6^{(8–6)}, 7–6^{(7–4)} | (Russia) Daniil Medvedev | (Greece) Stefanos Tsitsipas (Germany) Peter Gojowczyk | (France) Benoît Paire (Slovakia) Norbert Gombos (Croatia) Marin Čilić (United Kingdom) Kyle Edmund |
| 29 Jul | Washington Open; Washington, D.C., United States; ATP Tour 500 $2,046,340 − Hard − 48S/16Q/16D; Singles – Doubles | (South Africa) Raven Klaasen (New Zealand) Michael Venus; 3–6, 6–3, [10–2] | (Netherlands) Jean-Julien Rojer (Romania) Horia Tecău | (Greece) Stefanos Tsitsipas (Germany) Peter Gojowczyk | (France) Benoît Paire (Slovakia) Norbert Gombos (Croatia) Marin Čilić (United Kingdom) Kyle Edmund |
| 29 Jul | Los Cabos Open; Cabo San Lucas, Mexico; ATP Tour 250 $858,565 − Hard − 28S/16Q/16D; Singles – Doubles | (Argentina) Diego Schwartzman; 7–6^{(8–6)}, 6–3 | (United States) Taylor Fritz | (Moldova) Radu Albot (Argentina) Guido Pella | (Italy) Fabio Fognini (Australia) Thanasi Kokkinakis (Kazakhstan) Mikhail Kukushkin (South Korea) Kwon Soon-woo |
| 29 Jul | Los Cabos Open; Cabo San Lucas, Mexico; ATP Tour 250 $858,565 − Hard − 28S/16Q/16D; Singles – Doubles | (Monaco) Romain Arneodo (Monaco) Hugo Nys; 7–5, 5–7, [16–14] | (United Kingdom) Dominic Inglot (United States) Austin Krajicek | (Moldova) Radu Albot (Argentina) Guido Pella | (Italy) Fabio Fognini (Australia) Thanasi Kokkinakis (Kazakhstan) Mikhail Kukushkin (South Korea) Kwon Soon-woo |
| 29 Jul | Austrian Open Kitzbühel; Kitzbühel, Austria; ATP Tour 250 €586,140 − Clay (red) − 28S/16Q/16D; Singles – Doubles | (Austria) Dominic Thiem; 7–6^{(7–0)}, 6–1 | (Spain) Albert Ramos Viñolas | (Italy) Lorenzo Sonego (Norway) Casper Ruud | (Spain) Pablo Andújar (Spain) Fernando Verdasco (Uruguay) Pablo Cuevas (France) Jérémy Chardy |
| 29 Jul | Austrian Open Kitzbühel; Kitzbühel, Austria; ATP Tour 250 €586,140 − Clay (red) − 28S/16Q/16D; Singles – Doubles | (Austria) Philipp Oswald (Slovakia) Filip Polášek; 6–4, 6–4 | (Belgium) Sander Gillé (Belgium) Joran Vliegen | (Italy) Lorenzo Sonego (Norway) Casper Ruud | (Spain) Pablo Andújar (Spain) Fernando Verdasco (Uruguay) Pablo Cuevas (France) Jérémy Chardy |

=== August ===
| Week | Tournament | Champions | Runners-up | Semifinalists | Quarterfinalists |
|---|---|---|---|---|---|
| 5 Aug | Canadian Open; Montreal, Canada; ATP Tour Masters 1000 $5,701,945 − Hard − 56S/28Q/32D; Singles – Doubles | (Spain) Rafael Nadal; 6–3, 6–0 | (Russia) Daniil Medvedev | (France) Gaël Monfils (Russia) Karen Khachanov | (Italy) Fabio Fognini (Spain) Roberto Bautista Agut (Germany) Alexander Zverev (Austria) Dominic Thiem |
| 5 Aug | Canadian Open; Montreal, Canada; ATP Tour Masters 1000 $5,701,945 − Hard − 56S/28Q/32D; Singles – Doubles | (Spain) Marcel Granollers (Argentina) Horacio Zeballos; 7–5, 7–5 | (Netherlands) Robin Haase (Netherlands) Wesley Koolhof | (France) Gaël Monfils (Russia) Karen Khachanov | (Italy) Fabio Fognini (Spain) Roberto Bautista Agut (Germany) Alexander Zverev (Austria) Dominic Thiem |
| 12 Aug | Cincinnati Open; Mason, United States; ATP Tour Masters 1000; Hard – $6,056,280 – 56S/28Q/32D; Singles – Doubles | (Russia) Daniil Medvedev; 7–6^{(7–3)}, 6–4 | (Belgium) David Goffin | (Serbia) Novak Djokovic (France) Richard Gasquet | (France) Lucas Pouille (Russia) Andrey Rublev (Spain) Roberto Bautista Agut (Japan) Yoshihito Nishioka |
| 12 Aug | Cincinnati Open; Mason, United States; ATP Tour Masters 1000; Hard – $6,056,280 – 56S/28Q/32D; Singles – Doubles | (Croatia) Ivan Dodig (Slovakia) Filip Polášek; 4–6, 6–4, [10–6] | (Colombia) Juan Sebastián Cabal (Colombia) Robert Farah | (Serbia) Novak Djokovic (France) Richard Gasquet | (France) Lucas Pouille (Russia) Andrey Rublev (Spain) Roberto Bautista Agut (Japan) Yoshihito Nishioka |
| 19 Aug | Winston-Salem Open; Winston-Salem, United States; ATP Tour 250; Hard – $807,210 – 48S/16Q/16D; Singles – Doubles | (Poland) Hubert Hurkacz; 6–3, 3–6, 6–3 | (France) Benoît Paire | (United States) Steve Johnson (Canada) Denis Shapovalov | (Spain) Pablo Carreño Busta (Australia) John Millman (United States) Frances Tiafoe (Russia) Andrey Rublev |
| 19 Aug | Winston-Salem Open; Winston-Salem, United States; ATP Tour 250; Hard – $807,210 – 48S/16Q/16D; Singles – Doubles | (Poland) Łukasz Kubot (Brazil) Marcelo Melo; 6–7^{(6–8)}, 6–1, [10–3] | (United States) Nicholas Monroe (United States) Tennys Sandgren | (United States) Steve Johnson (Canada) Denis Shapovalov | (Spain) Pablo Carreño Busta (Australia) John Millman (United States) Frances Tiafoe (Russia) Andrey Rublev |
| 26 Aug; 2 Sep | US Open; New York City, United States; Grand Slam; Hard – $26,470,000; 128S/128Q/64D/32X; Singles – Doubles – Mixed doubles | (Spain) Rafael Nadal; 7–5, 6–3, 5–7, 4–6, 6–4 | (Russia) Daniil Medvedev | (Bulgaria) Grigor Dimitrov (Italy) Matteo Berrettini | (Switzerland) Stan Wawrinka (Switzerland) Roger Federer (France) Gaël Monfils (Argentina) Diego Schwartzman |
| 26 Aug; 2 Sep | US Open; New York City, United States; Grand Slam; Hard – $26,470,000; 128S/128Q/64D/32X; Singles – Doubles – Mixed doubles | (Colombia) Juan Sebastián Cabal (Colombia) Robert Farah; 6–4, 7–5 | (Spain) Marcel Granollers (Argentina) Horacio Zeballos | (Bulgaria) Grigor Dimitrov (Italy) Matteo Berrettini | (Switzerland) Stan Wawrinka (Switzerland) Roger Federer (France) Gaël Monfils (Argentina) Diego Schwartzman |
| 26 Aug; 2 Sep | US Open; New York City, United States; Grand Slam; Hard – $26,470,000; 128S/128Q/64D/32X; Singles – Doubles – Mixed doubles | (United States) Bethanie Mattek-Sands (United Kingdom) Jamie Murray; 6–2, 6–3 | (Chinese Taipei) Chan Hao-ching (New Zealand) Michael Venus | (Bulgaria) Grigor Dimitrov (Italy) Matteo Berrettini | (Switzerland) Stan Wawrinka (Switzerland) Roger Federer (France) Gaël Monfils (Argentina) Diego Schwartzman |

=== September ===
| Week | Tournament | Champions | Runners-up | Semifinalists | Quarterfinalists |
|---|---|---|---|---|---|
| 9 Sep | No tournaments scheduled. | | | | |
| 16 Sep | Laver Cup; Geneva, Switzerland; Hard (i) – $2,250,000 | Team Europe; 13–11 | Team World | | |
| 16 Sep | St. Petersburg Open; St. Petersburg, Russia; ATP Tour 250 $1,248,665 − Hard (i) − 28S/16Q/16D; Singles − Doubles | (Russia) Daniil Medvedev; 6–3, 6–1 | (Croatia) Borna Ćorić | (Belarus) Egor Gerasimov (Portugal) João Sousa | (Russia) Andrey Rublev (Italy) Matteo Berrettini (Norway) Casper Ruud (Kazakhstan) Mikhail Kukushkin |
| 16 Sep | St. Petersburg Open; St. Petersburg, Russia; ATP Tour 250 $1,248,665 − Hard (i) − 28S/16Q/16D; Singles − Doubles | (India) Divij Sharan (Slovakia) Igor Zelenay; 6–3, 3–6, [10–8] | (Italy) Matteo Berrettini (Italy) Simone Bolelli | (Belarus) Egor Gerasimov (Portugal) João Sousa | (Russia) Andrey Rublev (Italy) Matteo Berrettini (Norway) Casper Ruud (Kazakhstan) Mikhail Kukushkin |
| 16 Sep | Moselle Open; Metz, France; ATP Tour 250 €586,140 − Hard (i) − 28S/16Q/16D; Singles − Doubles | (France) Jo-Wilfried Tsonga; 6–7^{(4–7)}, 7–6^{(7–4)}, 6–3 | (Slovenia) Aljaž Bedene | (France) Benoît Paire (France) Lucas Pouille | (Spain) Pablo Carreño Busta (France) Grégoire Barrère (Serbia) Filip Krajinović (Georgia (country)) Nikoloz Basilashvili |
| 16 Sep | Moselle Open; Metz, France; ATP Tour 250 €586,140 − Hard (i) − 28S/16Q/16D; Singles − Doubles | (Sweden) Robert Lindstedt (Germany) Jan-Lennard Struff; 2–6, 7–6^{(7–1)}, [10–4] | (France) Nicolas Mahut (France) Édouard Roger-Vasselin | (France) Benoît Paire (France) Lucas Pouille | (Spain) Pablo Carreño Busta (France) Grégoire Barrère (Serbia) Filip Krajinović (Georgia (country)) Nikoloz Basilashvili |
| 23 Sep | Chengdu Open; Chengdu, China; ATP Tour 250 $1,213,295 − Hard − 28S/16Q/16D; Singles – Doubles | (Spain) Pablo Carreño Busta; 6–7^{(5–7)}, 6–4, 7–6^{(7–3)} | (Kazakhstan) Alexander Bublik | (Canada) Denis Shapovalov (South Africa) Lloyd Harris | (Belarus) Egor Gerasimov (Chile) Cristian Garín (Bulgaria) Grigor Dimitrov (Portugal) João Sousa |
| 23 Sep | Chengdu Open; Chengdu, China; ATP Tour 250 $1,213,295 − Hard − 28S/16Q/16D; Singles – Doubles | (Serbia) Nikola Ćaćić (Serbia) Dušan Lajović; 7–6^{(11–9)}, 3–6, [10–3] | (Israel) Jonathan Erlich (France) Fabrice Martin | (Canada) Denis Shapovalov (South Africa) Lloyd Harris | (Belarus) Egor Gerasimov (Chile) Cristian Garín (Bulgaria) Grigor Dimitrov (Portugal) João Sousa |
| 23 Sep | Zhuhai Championships; Zhuhai, China; ATP Tour 250 $1,000,000 − Hard − 28S/16Q/16D; Singles – Doubles | (Australia) Alex de Minaur; 7–6^{(7–4)}, 6–4 | (France) Adrian Mannarino | (Spain) Albert Ramos Viñolas (Spain) Roberto Bautista Agut | (Bosnia and Herzegovina) Damir Džumhur (France) Gaël Monfils (Croatia) Borna Ćorić (Italy) Andreas Seppi |
| 23 Sep | Zhuhai Championships; Zhuhai, China; ATP Tour 250 $1,000,000 − Hard − 28S/16Q/16D; Singles – Doubles | (Belgium) Sander Gillé (Belgium) Joran Vliegen; 7–6^{(7–2)}, 7–6^{(7–4)} | (Brazil) Marcelo Demoliner (Netherlands) Matwé Middelkoop | (Spain) Albert Ramos Viñolas (Spain) Roberto Bautista Agut | (Bosnia and Herzegovina) Damir Džumhur (France) Gaël Monfils (Croatia) Borna Ćorić (Italy) Andreas Seppi |
| 30 Sep | China Open; Beijing, China; ATP Tour 500; Hard – $3,666,275 – 32S/16Q/16D; Singles – Doubles | (Austria) Dominic Thiem; 3–6, 6–4, 6–1 | (Greece) Stefanos Tsitsipas | (Russia) Karen Khachanov (Germany) Alexander Zverev | (United Kingdom) Andy Murray (Italy) Fabio Fognini (United States) John Isner (United States) Sam Querrey |
| 30 Sep | China Open; Beijing, China; ATP Tour 500; Hard – $3,666,275 – 32S/16Q/16D; Singles – Doubles | (Croatia) Ivan Dodig (Slovakia) Filip Polášek; 6–3, 7–6^{(7–4)} | (Poland) Łukasz Kubot (Brazil) Marcelo Melo | (Russia) Karen Khachanov (Germany) Alexander Zverev | (United Kingdom) Andy Murray (Italy) Fabio Fognini (United States) John Isner (United States) Sam Querrey |
| 30 Sep | Japan Open; Tokyo, Japan; ATP Tour 500; Hard – $2,046,340 – 32S/16Q/16D; Singles – Doubles | (Serbia) Novak Djokovic; 6–3, 6–2 | (Australia) John Millman | (Belgium) David Goffin (United States) Reilly Opelka | (France) Lucas Pouille (South Korea) Chung Hyeon (Japan) Yasutaka Uchiyama (Japan) Taro Daniel |
| 30 Sep | Japan Open; Tokyo, Japan; ATP Tour 500; Hard – $2,046,340 – 32S/16Q/16D; Singles – Doubles | (France) Nicolas Mahut (France) Édouard Roger-Vasselin; 7–6^{(9–7)}, 6–4 | (Croatia) Nikola Mektić (Croatia) Franko Škugor | (Belgium) David Goffin (United States) Reilly Opelka | (France) Lucas Pouille (South Korea) Chung Hyeon (Japan) Yasutaka Uchiyama (Japan) Taro Daniel |

=== October ===
| Week | Tournament | Champions | Runners-up | Semifinalists | Quarterfinalists |
|---|---|---|---|---|---|
| 7 Oct | Shanghai Masters; Shanghai, China; ATP Tour Masters 1000 $7,473,620 − Hard − 56S/28Q/32D; Singles – Doubles | (Russia) Daniil Medvedev; 6–4, 6–1 | (Germany) Alexander Zverev | (Greece) Stefanos Tsitsipas (Italy) Matteo Berrettini | (Serbia) Novak Djokovic (Italy) Fabio Fognini (Austria) Dominic Thiem (Switzerland) Roger Federer |
| 7 Oct | Shanghai Masters; Shanghai, China; ATP Tour Masters 1000 $7,473,620 − Hard − 56S/28Q/32D; Singles – Doubles | (Croatia) Mate Pavić (Brazil) Bruno Soares; 6–4, 6–2 | (Poland) Łukasz Kubot (Brazil) Marcelo Melo | (Greece) Stefanos Tsitsipas (Italy) Matteo Berrettini | (Serbia) Novak Djokovic (Italy) Fabio Fognini (Austria) Dominic Thiem (Switzerland) Roger Federer |
| 14 Oct | Kremlin Cup; Moscow, Russia; ATP Tour 250 $922,520 − Hard (i) − 28S/16Q/16D; Singles – Doubles | (Russia) Andrey Rublev; 6–4, 6–0 | (France) Adrian Mannarino | (Croatia) Marin Čilić (Italy) Andreas Seppi | (Serbia) Nikola Milojević (France) Jérémy Chardy (Serbia) Dušan Lajović (Russia) Karen Khachanov |
| 14 Oct | Kremlin Cup; Moscow, Russia; ATP Tour 250 $922,520 − Hard (i) − 28S/16Q/16D; Singles – Doubles | (Brazil) Marcelo Demoliner (Netherlands) Matwé Middelkoop; 6–1, 6–2 | (Italy) Simone Bolelli (Argentina) Andrés Molteni | (Croatia) Marin Čilić (Italy) Andreas Seppi | (Serbia) Nikola Milojević (France) Jérémy Chardy (Serbia) Dušan Lajović (Russia) Karen Khachanov |
| 14 Oct | Stockholm Open; Stockholm, Sweden; ATP Tour 250 €711,275 − Hard (i) − 28S/16Q/16D; Singles – Doubles | (Canada) Denis Shapovalov; 6–4, 6–4 | (Serbia) Filip Krajinović | (Japan) Yūichi Sugita (Spain) Pablo Carreño Busta | (Serbia) Janko Tipsarević (Germany) Cedrik-Marcel Stebe (Japan) Yoshihito Nishioka (United States) Sam Querrey |
| 14 Oct | Stockholm Open; Stockholm, Sweden; ATP Tour 250 €711,275 − Hard (i) − 28S/16Q/16D; Singles – Doubles | (Finland) Henri Kontinen (France) Édouard Roger-Vasselin; 6–4, 6–2 | (Croatia) Mate Pavić (Brazil) Bruno Soares | (Japan) Yūichi Sugita (Spain) Pablo Carreño Busta | (Serbia) Janko Tipsarević (Germany) Cedrik-Marcel Stebe (Japan) Yoshihito Nishioka (United States) Sam Querrey |
| 14 Oct | European Open; Antwerp, Belgium; ATP Tour 250 €711,275 − Hard (i) − 28S/16Q/16D; Singles – Doubles | (United Kingdom) Andy Murray; 3–6, 6–4, 6–4 | (Switzerland) Stan Wawrinka | (Italy) Jannik Sinner (France) Ugo Humbert | (United States) Frances Tiafoe (France) Gilles Simon (Romania) Marius Copil (Argentina) Guido Pella |
| 14 Oct | European Open; Antwerp, Belgium; ATP Tour 250 €711,275 − Hard (i) − 28S/16Q/16D; Singles – Doubles | (Germany) Kevin Krawietz (Germany) Andreas Mies; 7–6^{(7–1)}, 6–3 | (United States) Rajeev Ram (United Kingdom) Joe Salisbury | (Italy) Jannik Sinner (France) Ugo Humbert | (United States) Frances Tiafoe (France) Gilles Simon (Romania) Marius Copil (Argentina) Guido Pella |
| 21 Oct | Vienna Open; Vienna, Austria; ATP Tour 500; Hard (i) – €2,443,810 – 32S/16Q/16D; Singles – Doubles | (Austria) Dominic Thiem; 3–6, 6–4, 6–3 | (Argentina) Diego Schwartzman | (Italy) Matteo Berrettini (France) Gaël Monfils | (Spain) Pablo Carreño Busta (Russia) Andrey Rublev (Slovenia) Aljaž Bedene (Russia) Karen Khachanov |
| 21 Oct | Vienna Open; Vienna, Austria; ATP Tour 500; Hard (i) – €2,443,810 – 32S/16Q/16D; Singles – Doubles | (United States) Rajeev Ram (United Kingdom) Joe Salisbury; 6–4, 6–7^{(5–7)}, [10–5] | (Poland) Łukasz Kubot (Brazil) Marcelo Melo | (Italy) Matteo Berrettini (France) Gaël Monfils | (Spain) Pablo Carreño Busta (Russia) Andrey Rublev (Slovenia) Aljaž Bedene (Russia) Karen Khachanov |
| 21 Oct | Swiss Indoors; Basel, Switzerland; ATP Tour 500; Hard (i) – €2,219,975 – 32S/16Q/16D; Singles – Doubles | (Switzerland) Roger Federer; 6–2, 6–2 | (Australia) Alex de Minaur | (Greece) Stefanos Tsitsipas (United States) Reilly Opelka | (Switzerland) Stan Wawrinka (Serbia) Filip Krajinović (Spain) Roberto Bautista Agut (Germany) Jan-Lennard Struff |
| 21 Oct | Swiss Indoors; Basel, Switzerland; ATP Tour 500; Hard (i) – €2,219,975 – 32S/16Q/16D; Singles – Doubles | (Netherlands) Jean-Julien Rojer (Romania) Horia Tecău; 7–5, 6–3 | (United States) Taylor Fritz (United States) Reilly Opelka | (Greece) Stefanos Tsitsipas (United States) Reilly Opelka | (Switzerland) Stan Wawrinka (Serbia) Filip Krajinović (Spain) Roberto Bautista Agut (Germany) Jan-Lennard Struff |
| 28 Oct | Paris Masters; Paris, France; ATP Tour Masters 1000 €5,207,405 − Hard (i) − 48S/24Q/32D; Singles – Doubles | (Serbia) Novak Djokovic; 6–3, 6–4 | (Canada) Denis Shapovalov | (Bulgaria) Grigor Dimitrov (Spain) Rafael Nadal | (Greece) Stefanos Tsitsipas (Chile) Cristian Garín (France) Gaël Monfils (France) Jo-Wilfried Tsonga |
| 28 Oct | Paris Masters; Paris, France; ATP Tour Masters 1000 €5,207,405 − Hard (i) − 48S/24Q/32D; Singles – Doubles | (France) Pierre-Hugues Herbert (France) Nicolas Mahut; 6–4, 6–1 | (Russia) Karen Khachanov (Russia) Andrey Rublev | (Bulgaria) Grigor Dimitrov (Spain) Rafael Nadal | (Greece) Stefanos Tsitsipas (Chile) Cristian Garín (France) Gaël Monfils (France) Jo-Wilfried Tsonga |

=== November ===
| Week | Tournament | Champions | Runners-up | Semifinalists | Quarterfinalists |
|---|---|---|---|---|---|
| 4 Nov | Next Gen ATP Finals; Milan, Italy; Next Generation ATP Finals; Hard (i) – $1,400,000 – 8S (RR); Singles | (Italy) Jannik Sinner; 4–2, 4–1, 4–2 | (Australia) Alex de Minaur | (United States) Frances Tiafoe (Serbia) Miomir Kecmanović | Round robin (Norway) Casper Ruud (Spain) Alejandro Davidovich; Fokina (Sweden) Mikael Ymer (France) Ugo Humbert |
| 4 Nov; 11 Nov | ATP Finals; London, United Kingdom; ATP Finals; Hard (i) – $9,000,000 – 8S/8D (RR); Singles – Doubles | (Greece) Stefanos Tsitsipas; 6–7^{(6–8)}, 6–2, 7–6^{(7–4)} | (Austria) Dominic Thiem | (Switzerland) Roger Federer (Germany) Alexander Zverev | Round robin (Spain) Rafael Nadal (Russia) Daniil Medvedev (Serbia) Novak Djokovic (Italy) Matteo Berrettini |
| 4 Nov; 11 Nov | ATP Finals; London, United Kingdom; ATP Finals; Hard (i) – $9,000,000 – 8S/8D (RR); Singles – Doubles | (France) Pierre-Hugues Herbert (France) Nicolas Mahut; 6–3, 6–4 | (South Africa) Raven Klaasen (New Zealand) Michael Venus | (Switzerland) Roger Federer (Germany) Alexander Zverev | Round robin (Spain) Rafael Nadal (Russia) Daniil Medvedev (Serbia) Novak Djokovic (Italy) Matteo Berrettini |
| 18 Nov | Davis Cup Finals; Madrid, Spain; Hard (i) | Spain; 2–0 | Canada | Russia; Great Britain | Serbia; Australia; Germany; Argentina |

== Statistical information ==
These tables present the number of singles (S), doubles (D), and mixed doubles (X) titles won by each player and each nation during the season, within all the tournament categories of the 2019 ATP Tour: the Grand Slam tournaments, the ATP Finals, the ATP Tour Masters 1000, the ATP Tour 500 series, and the ATP Tour 250 series. The players/nations are sorted by:

1. Total number of titles (a doubles title won by two players representing the same nation counts as only one win for the nation);
2. Cumulated importance of those titles (one Grand Slam win equalling two Masters 1000 wins, one undefeated ATP Finals win equalling one-and-a-half Masters 1000 win, one Masters 1000 win equalling two 500 events wins, one 500 event win equalling two 250 events wins);
3. A singles > doubles > mixed doubles hierarchy;
4. Alphabetical order (by family names for players).

Key
Grand Slam
ATP Finals
ATP Tour Masters 1000
ATP Tour 500
ATP Tour 250

=== Titles won by player ===
| Total | Player | Grand Slam | | | ATP Finals | | Masters 1000 | | Tour 500 | | Tour 250 | | Total | | |
| Total | Player | S | D | X | S | D | S | D | S | D | S | D | S | D | X |
|---|---|---|---|---|---|---|---|---|---|---|---|---|---|---|---|
| 6 | Ivan Dodig (CRO) | | | ● ● | | | | ● | | ● | | ● ● | 0 | 4 | 2 |
| 5 | Novak Djokovic (SRB) | ● ● | | | | | ● ● | | ● | | | | 5 | 0 | 0 |
| 5 | Juan Sebastián Cabal (COL) | | ● ● | | | | | ● | | ● | | ● | 0 | 5 | 0 |
| 5 | Robert Farah (COL) | | ● ● | | | | | ● | | ● | | ● | 0 | 5 | 0 |
| 5 | Dominic Thiem (AUT) | | | | | | ● | | ● ● ● | | ● | | 5 | 0 | 0 |
| 4 | Rafael Nadal (ESP) | ● ● | | | | | ● ● | | | | | | 4 | 0 | 0 |
| 4 | Daniil Medvedev (RUS) | | | | | | ● ● | | | | ● ● | | 4 | 0 | 0 |
| 4 | Roger Federer (SUI) | | | | | | ● | | ● ● ● | | | | 4 | 0 | 0 |
| 4 | Édouard Roger-Vasselin (FRA) | | | | | | | | | ● | | ● ● ● | 0 | 4 | 0 |
| 3 | Nicolas Mahut (FRA) | | ● | | | ● | | ● | | ● | | | 0 | 3 | 0 |
| 3 | Pierre-Hugues Herbert (FRA) | | ● | | | ● | | ● | | | | ● | 0 | 3 | 0 |
| 3 | Kevin Krawietz (GER) | | ● | | | | | | | | | ● ● | 0 | 3 | 0 |
| 3 | Andreas Mies (GER) | | ● | | | | | | | | | ● ● | 0 | 3 | 0 |
| 3 | Rajeev Ram (USA) | | | ● | | | | | | ● ● | | | 0 | 2 | 1 |
| 3 | Stefanos Tsitsipas (GRE) | | | | ● | | | | | | ● ● | | 3 | 0 | 0 |
| 3 | Nikola Mektić (CRO) | | | | | | | ● ● | | | | ● | 0 | 3 | 0 |
| 3 | Horacio Zeballos (ARG) | | | | | | | ● ● | | | | ● | 0 | 3 | 0 |
| 3 | Filip Polášek (SVK) | | | | | | | ● | | ● | | ● | 0 | 3 | 0 |
| 3 | Bruno Soares (BRA) | | | | | | | ● | | | | ● ● | 0 | 3 | 0 |
| 3 | Jérémy Chardy (FRA) | | | | | | | | | ● | | ● ● | 0 | 3 | 0 |
| 3 | Máximo González (ARG) | | | | | | | | | ● | | ● ● | 0 | 3 | 0 |
| 3 | Jürgen Melzer (AUT) | | | | | | | | | ● | | ● ● | 0 | 3 | 0 |
| 3 | Alex de Minaur (AUS) | | | | | | | | | | ● ● ● | | 3 | 0 | 0 |
| 3 | Sander Gillé (BEL) | | | | | | | | | | | ● ● ● | 0 | 3 | 0 |
| 3 | Joran Vliegen (BEL) | | | | | | | | | | | ● ● ● | 0 | 3 | 0 |
| 2 | Jamie Murray (GBR) | | | ● | | | | | | | | ● | 0 | 1 | 1 |
| 2 | Jean-Julien Rojer (NED) | | | | | | | ● | | ● | | | 0 | 2 | 0 |
| 2 | Horia Tecău (ROU) | | | | | | | ● | | ● | | | 0 | 2 | 0 |
| 2 | Bob Bryan (USA) | | | | | | | ● | | | | ● | 0 | 2 | 0 |
| 2 | Mike Bryan (USA) | | | | | | | ● | | | | ● | 0 | 2 | 0 |
| 2 | Marcel Granollers (ESP) | | | | | | | ● | | | | ● | 0 | 2 | 0 |
| 2 | Mate Pavić (CRO) | | | | | | | ● | | | | ● | 0 | 2 | 0 |
| 2 | Franko Škugor (CRO) | | | | | | | ● | | | | ● | 0 | 2 | 0 |
| 2 | Nick Kyrgios (AUS) | | | | | | | | ● ● | | | | 2 | 0 | 0 |
| 2 | Feliciano Lopez (ESP) | | | | | | | | ● | ● | | | 1 | 1 | 0 |
| 2 | Raven Klaasen (RSA) | | | | | | | | | ● ● | | | 0 | 2 | 0 |
| 2 | Joe Salisbury (GBR) | | | | | | | | | ● ● | | | 0 | 2 | 0 |
| 2 | Michael Venus (NZL) | | | | | | | | | ● ● | | | 0 | 2 | 0 |
| 2 | Nicolás Jarry (CHI) | | | | | | | | | ● | ● | | 1 | 1 | 0 |
| 2 | Andy Murray (GBR) | | | | | | | | | ● | ● | | 1 | 1 | 0 |
| 2 | Alexander Zverev (GER) | | | | | | | | | ● | ● | | 1 | 1 | 0 |
| 2 | Henri Kontinen (FIN) | | | | | | | | | ● | | ● | 0 | 2 | 0 |
| 2 | Oliver Marach (AUT) | | | | | | | | | ● | | ● | 0 | 2 | 0 |
| 2 | Matteo Berrettini (ITA) | | | | | | | | | | ● ● | | 2 | 0 | 0 |
| 2 | Cristian Garín (CHI) | | | | | | | | | | ● ● | | 2 | 0 | 0 |
| 2 | Benoît Paire (FRA) | | | | | | | | | | ● ● | | 2 | 0 | 0 |
| 2 | Jo-Wilfried Tsonga (FRA) | | | | | | | | | | ● ● | | 2 | 0 | 0 |
| 2 | Dušan Lajović (SRB) | | | | | | | | | | ● | ● | 1 | 1 | 0 |
| 2 | Dominic Inglot (GBR) | | | | | | | | | | | ● ● | 0 | 2 | 0 |
| 2 | Austin Krajicek (USA) | | | | | | | | | | | ● ● | 0 | 2 | 0 |
| 2 | Fabrice Martin (FRA) | | | | | | | | | | | ● ● | 0 | 2 | 0 |
| 2 | Philipp Oswald (AUT) | | | | | | | | | | | ● ● | 0 | 2 | 0 |
| 2 | Divij Sharan (IND) | | | | | | | | | | | ● ● | 0 | 2 | 0 |
| 2 | Jan-Lennard Struff (GER) | | | | | | | | | | | ● ● | 0 | 2 | 0 |
| 1 | Fabio Fognini (ITA) | | | | | | ● | | | | | | 1 | 0 | 0 |
| 1 | Nikoloz Basilashvili (GEO) | | | | | | | | ● | | | | 1 | 0 | 0 |
| 1 | Laslo Đere (SRB) | | | | | | | | ● | | | | 1 | 0 | 0 |
| 1 | Gaël Monfils (FRA) | | | | | | | | ● | | | | 1 | 0 | 0 |
| 1 | Mischa Zverev (GER) | | | | | | | | | ● | | | 0 | 1 | 0 |
| 1 | Radu Albot (MDA) | | | | | | | | | | ● | | 1 | 0 | 0 |
| 1 | Kevin Anderson (RSA) | | | | | | | | | | ● | | 1 | 0 | 0 |
| 1 | Roberto Bautista Agut (ESP) | | | | | | | | | | ● | | 1 | 0 | 0 |
| 1 | Pablo Carreño Busta (ESP) | | | | | | | | | | ● | | 1 | 0 | 0 |
| 1 | Marco Cecchinato (ITA) | | | | | | | | | | ● | | 1 | 0 | 0 |
| 1 | Taylor Fritz (USA) | | | | | | | | | | ● | | 1 | 0 | 0 |
| 1 | Hubert Hurkacz (POL) | | | | | | | | | | ● | | 1 | 0 | 0 |
| 1 | John Isner (USA) | | | | | | | | | | ● | | 1 | 0 | 0 |
| 1 | Juan Ignacio Londero (ARG) | | | | | | | | | | ● | | 1 | 0 | 0 |
| 1 | Adrian Mannarino (FRA) | | | | | | | | | | ● | | 1 | 0 | 0 |
| 1 | Kei Nishikori (JPN) | | | | | | | | | | ● | | 1 | 0 | 0 |
| 1 | Reilly Opelka (USA) | | | | | | | | | | ● | | 1 | 0 | 0 |
| 1 | Guido Pella (ARG) | | | | | | | | | | ● | | 1 | 0 | 0 |
| 1 | Albert Ramos Viñolas (ESP) | | | | | | | | | | ● | | 1 | 0 | 0 |
| 1 | Andrey Rublev (RUS) | | | | | | | | | | ● | | 1 | 0 | 0 |
| 1 | Tennys Sandgren (USA) | | | | | | | | | | ● | | 1 | 0 | 0 |
| 1 | Diego Schwartzman (ARG) | | | | | | | | | | ● | | 1 | 0 | 0 |
| 1 | Denis Shapovalov (CAN) | | | | | | | | | | ● | | 1 | 0 | 0 |
| 1 | Lorenzo Sonego (ITA) | | | | | | | | | | ● | | 1 | 0 | 0 |
| 1 | Romain Arneodo (MON) | | | | | | | | | | | ● | 0 | 1 | 0 |
| 1 | Rohan Bopanna (IND) | | | | | | | | | | | ● | 0 | 1 | 0 |
| 1 | Nikola Čačić (SRB) | | | | | | | | | | | ● | 0 | 1 | 0 |
| 1 | Marcus Daniell (NZL) | | | | | | | | | | | ● | 0 | 1 | 0 |
| 1 | Federico Delbonis (ARG) | | | | | | | | | | | ● | 0 | 1 | 0 |
| 1 | Marcelo Demoliner (BRA) | | | | | | | | | | | ● | 0 | 1 | 0 |
| 1 | Jonathan Erlich (ISR) | | | | | | | | | | | ● | 0 | 1 | 0 |
| 1 | David Goffin (BEL) | | | | | | | | | | | ● | 0 | 1 | 0 |
| 1 | Santiago González (MEX) | | | | | | | | | | | ● | 0 | 1 | 0 |
| 1 | Robin Haase (NED) | | | | | | | | | | | ● | 0 | 1 | 0 |
| 1 | Roman Jebavý (CZE) | | | | | | | | | | | ● | 0 | 1 | 0 |
| 1 | Wesley Koolhof (NED) | | | | | | | | | | | ● | 0 | 1 | 0 |
| 1 | Łukasz Kubot (POL) | | | | | | | | | | | ● | 0 | 1 | 0 |
| 1 | Robert Lindstedt (SWE) | | | | | | | | | | | ● | 0 | 1 | 0 |
| 1 | Ben McLachlan (JPN) | | | | | | | | | | | ● | 0 | 1 | 0 |
| 1 | Marcelo Melo (BRA) | | | | | | | | | | | ● | 0 | 1 | 0 |
| 1 | Matwé Middelkoop (NED) | | | | | | | | | | | ● | 0 | 1 | 0 |
| 1 | Andrés Molteni (ARG) | | | | | | | | | | | ● | 0 | 1 | 0 |
| 1 | Frederik Nielsen (DEN) | | | | | | | | | | | ● | 0 | 1 | 0 |
| 1 | Hugo Nys (MON) | | | | | | | | | | | ● | 0 | 1 | 0 |
| 1 | John Peers (AUS) | | | | | | | | | | | ● | 0 | 1 | 0 |
| 1 | Tim Pütz (GER) | | | | | | | | | | | ● | 0 | 1 | 0 |
| 1 | Aisam-ul-Haq Qureshi (PAK) | | | | | | | | | | | ● | 0 | 1 | 0 |
| 1 | Artem Sitak (NZL) | | | | | | | | | | | ● | 0 | 1 | 0 |
| 1 | Ken Skupski (GBR) | | | | | | | | | | | ● | 0 | 1 | 0 |
| 1 | Neal Skupski (GBR) | | | | | | | | | | | ● | 0 | 1 | 0 |
| 1 | Sergiy Stakhovsky (UKR) | | | | | | | | | | | ● | 0 | 1 | 0 |
| 1 | Igor Zelenay (SVK) | | | | | | | | | | | ● | 0 | 1 | 0 |

=== Titles won by nation ===
| Total | Nation | Grand Slam | | | ATP Finals | | Masters 1000 | | Tour 500 | | Tour 250 | | Total | | |
| Total | Nation | S | D | X | S | D | S | D | S | D | S | D | S | D | X |
|---|---|---|---|---|---|---|---|---|---|---|---|---|---|---|---|
| 16 | France (FRA) | | 1 | | | 1 | | 1 | 1 | 1 | 5 | 6 | 6 | 10 | 0 |
| 11 | Spain (ESP) | 2 | | | | | 2 | 1 | 1 | 1 | 3 | 1 | 8 | 3 | 0 |
| 11 | Croatia (CRO) | | | 2 | | | | 4 | | | | 5 | 0 | 9 | 2 |
| 11 | United States (USA) | | | 1 | | | | 1 | | 2 | 4 | 3 | 4 | 6 | 1 |
| 11 | Austria (AUT) | | | | | | 1 | | 3 | 1 | 1 | 5 | 5 | 6 | 0 |
| 9 | Great Britain (GBR) | | | 1 | | | | | | 3 | 1 | 4 | 1 | 7 | 1 |
| 9 | Argentina (ARG) | | | | | | | 2 | | 1 | 3 | 3 | 3 | 6 | 0 |
| 8 | Serbia (SRB) | 2 | | | | | 2 | | 2 | | 1 | 1 | 7 | 1 | 0 |
| 8 | Germany (GER) | | 1 | | | | | | | 1 | 1 | 5 | 1 | 7 | 0 |
| 6 | Australia (AUS) | | | | | | | | 2 | | 3 | 1 | 5 | 1 | 0 |
| 5 | Colombia (COL) | | 2 | | | | | 1 | | 1 | | 1 | 0 | 5 | 0 |
| 5 | Russia (RUS) | | | | | | 2 | | | | 3 | | 5 | 0 | 0 |
| 5 | Italy (ITA) | | | | | | 1 | | | | 4 | | 5 | 0 | 0 |
| 5 | Netherlands (NED) | | | | | | | 1 | | 1 | | 3 | 0 | 5 | 0 |
| 5 | Brazil (BRA) | | | | | | | 1 | | | | 4 | 0 | 5 | 0 |
| 4 | Switzerland (SUI) | | | | | | 1 | | 3 | | | | 4 | 0 | 0 |
| 4 | New Zealand (NZL) | | | | | | | | | 2 | | 2 | 0 | 4 | 0 |
| 4 | Chile (CHI) | | | | | | | | | 1 | 3 | | 3 | 1 | 0 |
| 4 | Belgium (BEL) | | | | | | | | | | | 4 | 0 | 4 | 0 |
| 3 | Greece (GRE) | | | | 1 | | | | | | 2 | | 3 | 0 | 0 |
| 3 | South Africa (RSA) | | | | | | | | | 2 | 1 | | 1 | 2 | 0 |
| 3 | Slovakia (SVK) | | | | | | | 1 | | | | 2 | 0 | 3 | 0 |
| 2 | Romania (ROU) | | | | | | | 1 | | 1 | | | 0 | 2 | 0 |
| 2 | Finland (FIN) | | | | | | | | | 1 | | 1 | 0 | 2 | 0 |
| 2 | Japan (JPN) | | | | | | | | | | 1 | 1 | 1 | 1 | 0 |
| 2 | Poland (POL) | | | | | | | | | | 1 | 1 | 1 | 1 | 0 |
| 2 | India (IND) | | | | | | | | | | | 2 | 0 | 2 | 0 |
| 1 | Georgia (GEO) | | | | | | | | 1 | | | | 1 | 0 | 0 |
| 1 | Canada (CAN) | | | | | | | | | | 1 | | 1 | 0 | 0 |
| 1 | Moldova (MDA) | | | | | | | | | | 1 | | 1 | 0 | 0 |
| 1 | Czech Republic (CZE) | | | | | | | | | | | 1 | 0 | 1 | 0 |
| 1 | Denmark (DEN) | | | | | | | | | | | 1 | 0 | 1 | 0 |
| 1 | Israel (ISR) | | | | | | | | | | | 1 | 0 | 1 | 0 |
| 1 | Mexico (MEX) | | | | | | | | | | | 1 | 0 | 1 | 0 |
| 1 | Monaco (MON) | | | | | | | | | | | 1 | 0 | 1 | 0 |
| 1 | Pakistan (PAK) | | | | | | | | | | | 1 | 0 | 1 | 0 |
| 1 | Sweden (SWE) | | | | | | | | | | | 1 | 0 | 1 | 0 |
| 1 | Ukraine (UKR) | | | | | | | | | | | 1 | 0 | 1 | 0 |

=== Titles information ===
The following players won their first main circuit title in singles, doubles or mixed doubles:

Singles

- (United States) Tennys Sandgren – Auckland (draw)
- (Australia) Alex de Minaur – Sydney (draw)
- (Argentina) Juan Ignacio Londero – Córdoba (draw)
- (United States) Reilly Opelka – New York (draw)
- (Serbia) Laslo Đere – Rio de Janeiro (draw)
- (Moldova) Radu Albot – Delray Beach (draw)
- (Argentina) Guido Pella – São Paulo (draw)
- (Chile) Cristian Garín – Houston (draw)
- (France) Adrian Mannarino – Rosmalen (draw)
- (Italy) Lorenzo Sonego – Antalya (draw)
- (United States) Taylor Fritz – Eastbourne (draw)
- (Chile) Nicolás Jarry – Båstad (draw)
- (Serbia) Dušan Lajović – Umag (draw)
- (Poland) Hubert Hurkacz – Winston-Salem (draw)
- (Canada) Denis Shapovalov – Stockholm (draw)

Doubles

- (Belgium) David Goffin – Doha (draw)
- (Germany) Kevin Krawietz – New York (draw)
- (Germany) Andreas Mies – New York (draw)
- (Belgium) Sander Gillé – Båstad (draw)
- (Belgium) Joran Vliegen – Båstad (draw)
- (Monaco) Romain Arneodo – Los Cabos (draw)
- (Monaco) Hugo Nys – Los Cabos (draw)
- (Slovakia) Igor Zelenay – St. Petersburg (draw)
- (Serbia) Nikola Ćaćić – Chengdu (draw)

Mixed doubles

- (United States) Rajeev Ram – **Australian Open** **(draw)**

The following players defended a main circuit title in singles, doubles, or mixed doubles:

Singles

- (Spain) Rafael Nadal – Rome (draw), **French Open (draw)**, Montreal (draw)
- (Serbia) Novak Djokovic – **Wimbledon (draw)**
- (Georgia (country)) Nikoloz Basilashvili – Hamburg (draw)
- (Switzerland) Roger Federer – Basel (draw)

Doubles

- (Argentina) Horacio Zeballos – Buenos Aires (draw)
- (Argentina) Federico Delbonis – São Paulo (draw)
- (Argentina) Máximo González – São Paulo (draw)
- (United States) Bob Bryan – Miami (draw)
- (United States) Mike Bryan – Miami (draw)
- (Colombia) Juan Sebastián Cabal – Rome (draw)
- (Colombia) Robert Farah – Rome (draw)
- (Austria) Oliver Marach – Geneva (draw)
- (Croatia) Mate Pavić – Geneva (draw)
- (United Kingdom) Dominic Inglot – Rosmalen (draw)
- (Netherlands) Robin Haase – Umag (draw)

Mixed doubles

- (Croatia) Ivan Dodig – **French Open** **(draw)**
- (United Kingdom) Jamie Murray – **US Open** **(draw)**

=== Best ranking ===
The following players achieved a career-high ranking this season in the top 50 (bold indicates players who entered the top 10 for the first time):

Singles

- (Tunisia) Malek Jaziri (reached no. 42 on January 7)
- (United States) Tennys Sandgren (reached no. 41 on January 14)
- (United States) Frances Tiafoe (reached no. 29 on February 11)
- (France) Pierre-Hugues Herbert (reached no. 36 on February 11)
- (Italy) Marco Cecchinato (reached no. 16 on February 25)
- (Kazakhstan) Mikhail Kukushkin (reached no. 39 on February 25)
- (Hungary) Márton Fucsovics (reached no. 31 on March 4)
- (Serbia) Dušan Lajović (reached no. 23 on April 29)
- (United Kingdom) Cameron Norrie (reached no. 41 on May 20)
- (Georgia (country)) Nikoloz Basilashvili (reached no. 16 on May 27)
- (Serbia) Laslo Đere (reached no. 27 on June 10)
- (Chile) Cristian Garín (reached no. 32 on June 10)
- (Germany) Jan-Lennard Struff (reached no. 33 on July 1)
- (Italy) Lorenzo Sonego (reached no. 46 on July 1)
- (Russia) **Karen Khachanov (reached no. 8 on July 15)**
- (Italy) **Fabio Fognini (reached no. 9 on July 15)**
- (Australia) Jordan Thompson (reached no. 43 on July 15)
- (Chile) Nicolás Jarry (reached no. 38 on July 22)
- (France) Ugo Humbert (reached no. 46 on July 22)
- (Greece) **Stefanos Tsitsipas (reached no. 5 on August 5)**
- (United States) Taylor Fritz (reached no. 25 on August 5)
- (Moldova) Radu Albot (reached no. 39 on August 5)
- (Argentina) Guido Pella (reached no. 20 on August 19)
- (Serbia) Miomir Kecmanović (reached no. 49 on August 19)
- (Russia) **Daniil Medvedev (reached no. 4 on September 9)**
- (Canada) Félix Auger-Aliassime (reached no. 17 on October 14)
- (Poland) Hubert Hurkacz (reached no. 33 on October 14)
- (Kazakhstan) Alexander Bublik (reached no. 48 on October 14)
- (Russia) Andrey Rublev (reached no. 22 on October 21)
- (Australia) Alex de Minaur (reached no. 18 on October 28)
- (United States) Reilly Opelka (reached no. 31 on October 28)
- (Italy) **Matteo Berrettini (reached no. 8 on November 4)**
- (Spain) **Roberto Bautista Agut (reached no. 9 on November 4)**
- (Canada) Denis Shapovalov (reached no. 15 on November 4)
- (Argentina) Juan Ignacio Londero (reached no. 50 on November 11)

Doubles

- (Argentina) Leonardo Mayer (reached no. 48 on January 28)
- (Czech Republic) Roman Jebavý (reached no. 43 on March 4)
- (Chile) Nicolás Jarry (reached no. 40 on March 18)
- (Croatia) **Nikola Mektić (reached no. 5 on April 22)**
- (Croatia) Franko Škugor (reached no. 17 on April 22)
- (Argentina) Máximo González (reached no. 22 on April 22)
- (Portugal) João Sousa (reached no. 29 on May 6)
- (United Kingdom) Neal Skupski (reached no. 27 on May 20)
- (United Kingdom) Jonny O'Mara (reached no. 44 on May 20)
- (United States) Austin Krajicek (reached no. 35 on May 27)
- (United Kingdom) Luke Bambridge (reached no. 41 on May 27)
- (France) Fabrice Martin (reached no. 28 on June 10)
- (France) Jérémy Chardy (reached no. 28 on June 17)
- (United Kingdom) Joe Salisbury (reached no. 19 on June 24)
- (Colombia) **Juan Sebastián Cabal (reached no. 1 on July 15)**
- (Colombia) **Robert Farah (reached no. 1 on July 15)**
- (New Zealand) **Michael Venus (reached no. 8 on August 5)**
- (Belgium) Sander Gillé (reached no. 48 on August 5)
- (South Africa) Raven Klaasen (reached no. 7 on August 5)
- (Argentina) Diego Schwartzman (reached no. 40 on August 19)
- (Argentina) **Horacio Zeballos (reached no. 3 on September 9)**
- (United States) **Rajeev Ram (reached no. 9 on October 28)**
- (Germany) **Kevin Krawietz (reached no. 7 on November 4)**
- (Germany) **Andreas Mies (reached no. 8 on November 4)**
- (Slovakia) **Filip Polášek (reached no. 10 on November 4)**
- (Netherlands) Wesley Koolhof (reached no. 12 on November 4)
- (Belgium) Joran Vliegen (reached no. 37 on November 4)
- (Canada) Denis Shapovalov (reached no. 49 on November 4)

== ATP ranking ==
These are the ATP rankings and yearly ATP race rankings of the top 20 singles players, doubles players and doubles teams at the current date of the 2019 season.

=== Singles ===
Singles race rankings final rankings
| # | Player | Points | Tours |
|---|---|---|---|
| 1 | Rafael Nadal (ESP) | 9,585 | 12 |
| 2 | Novak Djokovic (SRB) | 8,945 | 16 |
| 3 | Roger Federer (SUI) | 6,190 | 16 |
| 4 | Daniil Medvedev (RUS) | 5,705 | 23 |
| 5 | Dominic Thiem (AUT) | 5,025 | 21 |
| 6 | Stefanos Tsitsipas (GRE) | 4,000 | 26 |
| 7 | Alexander Zverev (GER) | 2,945 | 23 |
| 8 | Matteo Berrettini (ITA) | 2,670 | 25 |
| 9 | Roberto Bautista Agut (ESP) | 2,540 | 23 |
| 10 | Gaël Monfils (FRA) | 2,530 | 21 |
| 11 | David Goffin (BEL) | 2,335 | 27 |
| 12 | Fabio Fognini (ITA) | 2,290 | 24 |
| 13 | Kei Nishikori (JPN) | 2,180 | 16 |
| 14 | Diego Schwartzman (ARG) | 2,125 | 25 |
| 15 | Denis Shapovalov (CAN) | 2,050 | 26 |
| 16 | Stan Wawrinka (SUI) | 2,000 | 20 |
| 17 | Karen Khachanov (RUS) | 1,840 | 26 |
| 18 | Alex de Minaur (AUS) | 1,775 | 23 |
| 19 | John Isner (USA) | 1,770 | 20 |
| 20 | Grigor Dimitrov (BUL) | 1,747 | 22 |

Qualified for the 2019 ATP Finals

Year-end rankings 2019 (30 December 2019)
| # | Player | Points | #Trn | '18 Rk | High | Low | '18→'19 |
|---|---|---|---|---|---|---|---|
| 1 | Rafael Nadal (ESP) | 9,985 | 13 | 2 | 1 | 2 | ▲1 |
| 2 | Novak Djokovic (SRB) | 9,145 | 17 | 1 | 1 | 2 | ▼1 |
| 3 | Roger Federer (SUI) | 6,590 | 17 | 3 | 3 | 7 | Steady |
| 4 | Dominic Thiem (AUT) | 5,825 | 22 | 8 | 4 | 8 | ▲4 |
| 5 | Daniil Medvedev (RUS) | 5,705 | 24 | 16 | 4 | 19 | ▲11 |
| 6 | Stefanos Tsitsipas (GRE) | 5,300 | 27 | 15 | 5 | 15 | ▲9 |
| 7 | Alexander Zverev (GER) | 3,345 | 24 | 4 | 3 | 7 | ▼3 |
| 8 | Matteo Berrettini (ITA) | 2,870 | 26 | 54 | 8 | 57 | ▲46 |
| 9 | Roberto Bautista Agut (ESP) | 2,540 | 23 | 24 | 9 | 25 | ▲15 |
| 10 | Gaël Monfils (FRA) | 2,530 | 21 | 29 | 10 | 33 | ▲19 |
| 11 | David Goffin (BEL) | 2,335 | 27 | 22 | 11 | 33 | ▲11 |
| 12 | Fabio Fognini (ITA) | 2,290 | 24 | 13 | 9 | 18 | ▲1 |
| 13 | Kei Nishikori (JPN) | 2,180 | 16 | 9 | 5 | 13 | ▼4 |
| 14 | Diego Schwartzman (ARG) | 2,125 | 25 | 17 | 14 | 27 | ▲3 |
| 15 | Denis Shapovalov (CAN) | 2,050 | 26 | 27 | 15 | 38 | ▲12 |
| 16 | Stan Wawrinka (SUI) | 2,000 | 20 | 66 | 16 | 68 | ▲50 |
| 17 | Karen Khachanov (RUS) | 1,840 | 26 | 11 | 8 | 17 | ▼6 |
| 18 | Alex de Minaur (AUS) | 1,775 | 23 | 31 | 18 | 38 | ▲13 |
| 19 | John Isner (USA) | 1,770 | 20 | 10 | 9 | 20 | ▼9 |
| 20 | Grigor Dimitrov (BUL) | 1,747 | 22 | 19 | 20 | 78 | ▼1 |

==== No. 1 ranking ====
| Holder | Date gained | Date forfeited |
|---|---|---|
| Novak Djokovic (SRB) | Year end 2018 | 3 November 2019 |
| Rafael Nadal (ESP) | 4 November 2019 | Year end 2019 |

=== Doubles ===
Doubles team race rankings final rankings
| # | Team | Points | Tours |
|---|---|---|---|
| 1 | Juan Sebastián Cabal (COL); Robert Farah (COL) | 8,300 | 21 |
| 2 | Łukasz Kubot (POL); Marcelo Melo (BRA) | 4,645 | 21 |
| 3 | Kevin Krawietz (GER); Andreas Mies (GER) | 3,985 | 21 |
| 4 | Rajeev Ram (USA); Joe Salisbury (GBR) | 3,670 | 24 |
| 5 | Raven Klaasen (RSA); Michael Venus (NZL) | 3,640 | 20 |
| 6 | Jean-Julien Rojer (NED); Horia Tecău (ROU) | 3,585 | 23 |
| 7 | Bob Bryan (USA); Mike Bryan (USA) | 3,380 | 20 |
| 8 | Pierre-Hugues Herbert (FRA); Nicolas Mahut (FRA) | 3,360 | 7 |
| 9 | Ivan Dodig (CRO); Filip Polášek (SVK) | 3,225 | 11 |
| 10 | Henri Kontinen (FIN); John Peers (AUS) | 3,000 | 19 |
| 11 | Jérémy Chardy (FRA); Fabrice Martin (FRA) | 2,600 | 15 |
| 12 | Marcel Granollers (ESP); Horacio Zeballos (ARG) | 2,470 | 6 |

Team qualified for the 2019 ATP Finals
Team qualified but withdrew from the 2019 ATP Finals

Year-end rankings 2019 (30 December 2019)
| # | Player | Points | #Trn | '18 Rank | High | Low | '18→'19 |
|---|---|---|---|---|---|---|---|
| 1 | Juan Sebastián Cabal (COL) | 8,230 | 23 | 5T | 1T | 11T | ▲4 |
| 1 | Robert Farah (COL) | 8,230 | 23 | 5T | 1T | 11T | ▲4 |
| 3 | Nicolas Mahut (FRA) | 7,180 | 19 | 11 | 3 | 14 | ▲8 |
| 4 | Horacio Zeballos (ARG) | 5,610 | 24 | 29 | 3 | 30 | ▲25 |
| 5 | Pierre-Hugues Herbert (FRA) | 5,290 | 13 | 12 | 4 | 25 | ▲7 |
| 6 | Łukasz Kubot (POL) | 5,090 | 25 | 9T | 2 | 10 | ▲3 |
| 7 | Marcelo Melo (BRA) | 4,910 | 25 | 9T | 4 | 12 | ▲2 |
| 8 | Raven Klaasen (RSA) | 4,665 | 25 | 15 | 8 | 15 | ▲7 |
| 9 | Kevin Krawietz (GER) | 4,660 | 30 | 71 | 7 | 70 | ▲62 |
| 10 | Michael Venus (NZL) | 4,530 | 24 | 16 | 9 | 18 | ▲6 |
| 11 | Andreas Mies (GER) | 4,500 | 32 | 73 | 8 | 71 | ▲62 |
| 12 | Ivan Dodig (CRO) | 4,270 | 29 | 35 | 9 | 39 | ▲23 |
| 13 | Filip Polášek (SVK) | 4,220 | 26 | 163 | 10 | 166 | ▲150 |
| 14 | Wesley Koolhof (NED) | 3,820 | 28 | 42 | 12 | 46 | ▲28 |
| 15 | Nikola Mektić (CRO) | 3,810 | 28 | 13 | 5 | 19 | ▼2 |
| 16 | Édouard Roger-Vasselin (FRA) | 3,770 | 25 | 24 | 15 | 31 | ▲8 |
| 17 | Henri Kontinen (FIN) | 3,750 | 22 | 26 | 12 | 29 | ▲9 |
| 18 | Mate Pavić (CRO) | 3,740 | 27 | 3 | 3 | 23 | ▼15 |
| 19 | Horia Tecău (ROU) | 3,650 | 26 | 27 | 10 | 36 | ▲8 |
| 20 | Jean-Julien Rojer (NED) | 3,650 | 28 | 19 | 11 | 27 | ▼1 |

==== No. 1 ranking ====
| Holder | Date gained | Date forfeited |
|---|---|---|
| Mike Bryan (USA) | Year end 2018 | 14 July 2019 |
| Juan Sebastián Cabal (COL); Robert Farah (COL) | 15 July 2019 | Year end 2019 |

== Best matches by ATPTour.com ==
=== Best 6 Grand Slam tournament matches ===
| | Event | Round | Surface | Winner | Opponent | Result |
|---|---|---|---|---|---|---|
| 1. | Wimbledon | F | Grass | (Serbia) Novak Djokovic | (Switzerland) Roger Federer | 7–6^{(7–5)}, 1–6, 7–6^{(7–4)}, 4–6, 13–12^{(7–3)} |
| 2. | French Open | R4 | Clay | (Switzerland) Stan Wawrinka | (Greece) Stefanos Tsitsipas | 7–6^{(8–6)}, 5–7, 6–4, 3–6, 8–6 |
| 3. | US Open | F | Hard | (Spain) Rafael Nadal | (Russia) Daniil Medvedev | 7–5, 6–3, 5–7, 4–6, 6–4 |
| 4. | Australian Open | R1 | Hard | (Spain) Roberto Bautista Agut | (United Kingdom) Andy Murray | 6–4, 6–4, 6–7^{(5–7)}, 6–7^{(4–7)}, 6–2 |
| 5. | Wimbledon | SF | Grass | (Switzerland) Roger Federer | (Spain) Rafael Nadal | 7–6^{(7–3)}, 1–6, 6–3, 6–4 |
| 6. | Australian Open | R2 | Hard | (Canada) Milos Raonic | (Switzerland) Stan Wawrinka | 6–7^{(7–4)}, 7–6^{(8–6)}, 7–6^{(13–11)}, 7–6^{(7–5)} |

=== Best 6 ATP Tour matches ===
| | Event | Round | Surface | Winner | Opponent | Result |
|---|---|---|---|---|---|---|
| 1. | ATP Finals | RR | Hard (i) | (Austria) Dominic Thiem | (Serbia) Novak Djokovic | 6–7^{(5–7)}, 6–3, 7–6^{(7–5)} |
| 2. | Indian Wells Open | F | Hard | (Austria) Dominic Thiem | (Switzerland) Roger Federer | 3–6, 6–3, 7–5 |
| 3. | Washington Open | SF | Hard | (Australia) Nick Kyrgios | (Greece) Stefanos Tsitsipas | 6–4, 3–6, 7–6^{(9–7)} |
| 4. | ATP Finals | F | Hard (i) | (Greece) Stefanos Tsitsipas | (Austria) Dominic Thiem | 6–7^{(6–8)}, 6–2, 7–6^{(7–4)} |
| 5. | Italian Open | QF | Clay | (Serbia) Novak Djokovic | (Argentina) Juan Martín del Potro | 4–6, 7–6^{(8–6)}, 6–4 |
| 6. | Shanghai Masters | QF | Hard | (Germany) Alexander Zverev | (Switzerland) Roger Federer | 6–3, 6–7^{(7–9)}, 6–3 |

== Point distribution ==
| Category | W | F | SF | QF | R16 | R32 | R64 | R128 | Q | Q3 | Q2 | Q1 |
| Grand Slam (128S) | 2000 | 1200 | 720 | 360 | 180 | 90 | 45 | 10 | 25 | 16 | 8 | 0 |
| Grand Slam (64D) | 2000 | 1200 | 720 | 360 | 180 | 90 | 0 | – | 25 | – | 0 | 0 |
| ATP Finals (8S/8D) | 1500 (max) 1100 (min) | 1000 (max) 600 (min) | 600 (max); 200 (min) | 200 for each round robin match win, +400 for a semifinal win, +500 for the final win. | | | | | | | | |
| ATP Tour Masters 1000 (96S) | 1000 | 600 | 360 | 180 | 90 | 45 | 25 | 10 | 16 | – | 8 | 0 |
| ATP Tour Masters 1000 (56S/48S) | 1000 | 600 | 360 | 180 | 90 | 45 | 10 | – | 25 | – | 16 | 0 |
| ATP Tour Masters 1000 (32D) | 1000 | 600 | 360 | 180 | 90 | 0 | – | – | – | – | – | – |
| ATP Tour 500 (48S) | 500 | 300 | 180 | 90 | 45 | 20 | 0 | – | 10 | – | 4 | 0 |
| ATP Tour 500 (32S) | 500 | 300 | 180 | 90 | 45 | 0 | – | – | 20 | – | 10 | 0 |
| ATP Tour 500 (16D) | 500 | 300 | 180 | 90 | 0 | – | – | – | 45 | – | 25 | 0 |
| ATP Tour 250 (48S) | 250 | 150 | 90 | 45 | 20 | 10 | 0 | – | 5 | – | 3 | 0 |
| ATP Tour 250 (32S/28S) | 250 | 150 | 90 | 45 | 20 | 0 | – | – | 12 | – | 6 | 0 |
| ATP Tour 250 (16D) | 250 | 150 | 90 | 45 | 0 | – | – | – | – | – | – | – |

== Prize money leaders ==
| # | Player | Singles | Doubles | Year-to-date |
|---|---|---|---|---|
| 1 | Rafael Nadal (ESP) | $16,349,586 | $0 | $16,349,586 |
| 2 | Novak Djokovic (SRB) | $13,277,228 | $95,127 | $13,372,355 |
| 3 | Roger Federer (SUI) | $8,716,975 | $0 | $8,716,975 |
| 4 | Dominic Thiem (AUT) | $7,836,322 | $163,901 | $8,000,223 |
| 5 | Daniil Medvedev (RUS) | $7,833,320 | $69,592 | $7,902,912 |
| 6 | Stefanos Tsitsipas (GRE) | $7,272,204 | $216,723 | $7,488,927 |
| 7 | Alexander Zverev (GER) | $4,143,723 | $136,912 | $4,280,635 |
| 8 | Matteo Berrettini (ITA) | $3,363,218 | $76,565 | $3,439,783 |
| 9 | Gaël Monfils (FRA) | $2,901,347 | $15,240 | $2,916,587 |
| 10 | Roberto Bautista Agut (ESP) | $2,911,522 | $0 | $2,911,522 |
Prize money given in US$ as of November 25, 2019

== Retirements ==
Following is a list of notable players (winners of a main tour title, and/or part of the ATP rankings top 100 [singles] or top 100 [doubles] for at least one week) who returned from retirement, announced their retirement from professional tennis, became inactive (after not playing for more than 52 weeks), or were permanently banned from playing, during the 2019 season:

- Nicolás Almagro (born 21 August 1985 in Murcia, Spain) joined the professional tour in 2003 and reached a career-high ranking of No. 9 in singles in May 2011. He won 13 titles in singles and reached four Grand Slam quarterfinals. Almagro announced his retirement during the Murcia Open in April 2019, which would be his last professional tournament.
- Marcos Baghdatis (born 17 June 1985 in Limassol, Cyprus) joined the professional tour in 2003 and reached a career-high ranking of No. 8 in singles in August 2006. He won four singles titles and reached the final at the 2006 Australian Open, losing to Roger Federer. Baghdatis announced that Wimbledon would be his last tournament after receiving a wild card.
- Tomáš Berdych (born 17 September 1985 in Valašské Meziříčí, Czechoslovakia (present-day Czech Republic)) joined the professional tour in 2002 and reached a career-high ranking of No. 4 in singles in May 2015 and No. 54 in doubles in April 2006. He won 13 titles in singles and reached the 2010 Wimbledon final, losing to Rafael Nadal. He also won two titles and reached the 2005 Australian Open quarterfinals in doubles. Additionally, he was a part of the Czech Republic Davis Cup team that won the 2012 and 2013 Davis Cups. Berdych announced his retirement from professional tennis at the end of the 2019 ATP Finals after struggling with injuries.
- Carlos Berlocq (born 3 February 1983 in Chascomús, Argentina) joined the professional tour in 2001 and reached a career-high ranking of No. 37 in singles in March 2012 and No. 50 in doubles in June 2011. He was a part of Argentina's winning Davis Cup team in 2016 and won two titles in both singles and doubles. Berlocq announced his retirement in late December 2019.
- Daniel Brands (born 17 July 1987 in Deggendorf, Germany) joined the professional tour in 2005 and reached a career-high ranking of No. 51 in singles in August 2013. He reached the fourth round in singles at the 2010 Wimbledon Championships. He also won 7 titles in singles on the Challenger Tour. Brands announced his retirement in July 2019 after struggling with a knee injury for two years.
- Víctor Estrella Burgos (born 2 August 1980 in Santiago de los Caballeros, Santiago, Dominican Republic) joined the professional tour in 2002 and reached a career-high ranking of No. 43 in singles in July 2015. He won three singles titles, all of which were consecutive titles at the Ecuador Open. He also won 7 Challenger titles and was a runner-up at two tournaments in doubles. At the time of his retirement, he was the highest ranked Dominican tennis player in history. Estrella announced that his last tournament would be the Santo Domingo Open in October.
- David Ferrer (born 2 April 1982 in Xàbia, Alicante, Spain) joined the professional tour in 2000 and reached a career-high ranking of No. 3 in singles in July 2013. In singles, he won 27 titles and was runner-up at the 2007 Tennis Masters Cup and the 2013 French Open. He also won the Davis Cup three times in 2008, 2009 and 2011. In doubles, he won two titles and finished in fourth place at the 2012 Summer Olympics alongside Feliciano López. Ferrer played his last tournament at the Madrid Open.
- Andreas Haider-Maurer (born 22 March 1987 in Zwettl, Austria) joined the professional tour in 2005 and reached a career-high ranking of No. 47 in singles in April 2015. He won 9 Challenger titles and retired due to injuries in January 2019.
- (Australia) Rameez Junaid (born 25 May 1981, in Faisalabad, Pakistan) joined the professional tour in 2000 and reached career-high rankings of No. 62 in doubles in April 2015. He won one doubles title. Junaid announced he had retired in this season.
- Marcin Matkowski (born 15 January 1981 in Barlinek, Poland) joined the professional tour in 2003 and reached a career-high ranking of No. 7 in doubles in July 2012. In doubles, he won 18 titles and was a runner-up at the 2011 US Open and the 2011 ATP World Tour Finals alongside Mariusz Fyrstenberg. In mixed doubles, he was a runner-up at the 2012 US Open and 2015 French Open. Matkowski plans to retire at either the Szczecin Challenger or the Davis Cup in September.
- Daniel Muñoz de la Nava (born 29 January 1982 in Madrid, Spain) joined the professional tour in 1999 and reached a career-high ranking of No. 68 in singles in February 2016. He played mostly on the Challenger Tour, where he won four titles.
- (Austria) Alexander Peya joined the professional tour in 1998 and reached career-high rankings of No. 92 in singles in April 2007 and No. 3 in doubles in August 2013. He won seventeen doubles titles and one mixed doubles major title at the 2018 Wimbledon Championships, partnering Nicole Melichar-Martinez. Peya retired in this season.
- Hans Podlipnik Castillo (born 9 January 1988 in Lo Barnechea, Chile) joined the professional tour in 2005 and reached a career-high ranking of No. 43 in doubles in February 2018. He won one title, 20 Challenger titles and reached one Grand Slam quarterfinal in doubles. Podlipnik announced his retirement after his participation with Chile at the 2019 Davis Cup Finals.
- Michał Przysiężny (born 16 February 1984 in Głogów, Poland) joined the professional tour in 2001 and reached a career-high ranking of No. 57 in singles in January 2014. He won one doubles title, one Challenger doubles title and 8 Challenger singles titles. Przysiężny announced that the Sopot Open would be his last tournament.
- Tim Smyczek (born 30 December 1987 in Milwaukee, Wisconsin, United States) joined the professional tour in 2006 and reached a career-high ranking of No. 68 in singles in April 2015. He made the semifinals of Newport in 2018. Additionally, he won 7 titles on the Challenger Tour. His last match was at the 2019 Citi Open.
- Janko Tipsarević (born 22 June 1984 in Belgrade, Yugoslavia (present day Serbia)) joined the professional tour in 2002 and reached a career-high ranking of No. 8 in singles in April 2012 and No. 46 in doubles in April 2011. He won four titles in singles and one in doubles, as well as reaching two Grand Slam quarterfinals in both. He was also part of the Serbia Davis Cup team that won the 2010 Davis Cup. Tipsarević announced in August 2019 that the 2019 Davis Cup Finals would be his last professional competition.
- (Chinese Taipei) Jimmy Wang (born 8 February 1985 in Saudi Arabia) joined the professional tour in 2001 and reached a career-high ranking of No. 85 in singles in March 2006. He played his last match at the 2019 OEC Kaohsiung in doubles with Hsu Yu-hsiou.

=== Inactivity ===
- (Belarus) Aliaksandr Bury became inactive, having not played a match since 2018.
- (Croatia) Marin Draganja became inactive, having not played a match since 2018.
- (Uzbekistan) Farrukh Dustov became inactive, having not played a match since 2018.
- (Chinese Taipei) Hsien-yin Peng became inactive, having not played a match since 2018.

== Comebacks ==
Following are notable players who came back after retirements during the 2019 ATP Tour season:

- (United States) Alex Kuznetsov returned for one tournament at the 2019 RBC Tennis Championships of Dallas, partnering John Isner in the doubles event.
- Nicolás Massú (born 10 October 1979 in Viña del Mar, Chile) joined the professional tour in 1997 and reached a career-high ranking of No. 9 in singles in September 2004 and No. 31 in doubles in July 2005. Massú won two gold medals at the 2004 Summer Olympics, defeating Mardy Fish in singles and alongside Fernando González in doubles, as well as 5 other singles titles. He came back to the tour as a wild card pairing with Moritz Thiem in the doubles of the 2019 Generali Open Kitzbühel.

== See also ==
- 2019 WTA Tour
- 2019 ATP Challenger Tour
- Association of Tennis Professionals
- International Tennis Federation
