= 2019 Brasil Open =

- Date: February 25 – March 3
- Edition: 19th
- Category: ATP Tour 250 series
- Draw: 28S / 16D
- Prize money: $550,145
- Surface: Clay - indoor
- Location: São Paulo, Brazil

Champions

Singles
- (Argentina) Guido Pella

Doubles
- (Argentina) Federico Delbonis / (Argentina) Máximo González
- Brasil Open

The 2019 Brasil Open was a men's tennis tournament played on indoor clay courts. It was the 19th and last edition of the Brasil Open, and part of the ATP Tour 250 series of the 2019 ATP Tour. It took place from February 25 through March 3, 2019, in São Paulo, Brazil. Third-seeded Guido Pella won the singles title.

== Finals ==
=== Singles ===
- (Argentina) Guido Pella defeated (Chile) Cristian Garín, 7–5, 6–3.

=== Doubles ===
- (Argentina) Federico Delbonis / (Argentina) Máximo González defeated (United Kingdom) Luke Bambridge / (United Kingdom) Jonny O'Mara, 6–4, 6–3

== Singles main-draw entrants ==
=== Seeds ===
Country	Player	Ranking^{1}	Seed
POR	João Sousa	40	1
TUN	Malek Jaziri	44	2
ARG	Guido Pella	46	3
ARG	Leonardo Mayer	55	4
URU	Pablo Cuevas	63	5
ESP	Jaume Munar	66	6
ARG	Juan Ignacio Londero	69	7
JPN	Taro Daniel	73	8

- ^{1} Rankings as of February 18, 2019.

=== Other entrants ===
The following players received wildcards into the singles main draw:

- (Uruguay) Pablo Cuevas
- (Brazil) Thiago Monteiro
- (Brazil) Thiago Seyboth Wild

The following players received entry from the qualifying draw:

- (Argentina) Facundo Bagnis
- (Italy) Alessandro Giannessi
- (Spain) Pedro Martínez
- (Brazil) Pedro Sakamoto

== Doubles main-draw entrants ==
=== Seeds ===
Country	Player	Country	Player	Rank^{1}	Seed
URU	Pablo Cuevas	ARG	Horacio Zeballos	69	1
ARG	Leonardo Mayer	POR	João Sousa	84	2
CZE	Roman Jebavý	ARG	Andrés Molteni	98	3
GBR	Luke Bambridge	GBR	Jonny O'Mara	103	4

- ^{1} Rankings as of February 18, 2019.

=== Other entrants ===
The following pairs received wildcards into the doubles main draw:

- (Brazil) Thomaz Bellucci / (Brazil) Rogério Dutra Silva
- (Brazil) Igor Marcondes / (Brazil) Rafael Matos
