= 2019 Brasil Open – Singles =

Singles
- 2019 Brasil Open

Final
- Champion: (Argentina) Guido Pella
- Runner-up: (Chile) Cristian Garín
- Score: 7–5, 6–3

Details
- Draw: 28 (4 Q / 3 WC )
- Seeds: 8

Events
Singles	Doubles
- Brasil Open

Fabio Fognini was the defending champion, but chose not to defend his title.

Guido Pella won his first ATP title, defeating Cristian Garín 7–5, 6–3 in the final.

== Seeds ==
The top four seeds received a bye into the second round.

1. (Portugal) João Sousa (second round)
2. (Tunisia) Malek Jaziri (second round)
3. (Argentina) Guido Pella (champion)
4. (Argentina) Leonardo Mayer (quarterfinals)
5. (Uruguay) Pablo Cuevas (first round)
6. (Spain) Jaume Munar (second round)
7. (Argentina) Juan Ignacio Londero (second round)
8. (Japan) Taro Daniel (first round)

== Draw ==
Key

- Q = Qualifier
- WC = Wild card
- LL = Lucky loser
- Alt = Alternate
- ITF = ITF entry
- PR = Protected ranking
- SR = Special ranking
- SE = Special exempt
- JE = Junior exempt
- JR = Junior Accelerator Programme entrant
- CO = College Accelerator Programme entrant
- NG = Next Gen Accelerator Program entrant
- w/o = Walkover
- r = Retired
- d = Defaulted

=== Finals ===
Semifinals
(Norway) Casper Ruud	4	4
(Chile) Cristian Garín	6	6
3	(Argentina) Guido Pella	7^{12}	7^{7}
(Serbia) Laslo Đere	6^{10}	6^{1}

Final
(Chile) Cristian Garín	5	3
3	(Argentina) Guido Pella	7	6

=== Top half ===
First round
(Norway) C Ruud	6	6
WC	(Brazil) T Monteiro	3	4
Q	(Spain) P Martínez	1	2
(Bolivia) H Dellien	6	6
(Italy) P Lorenzi	6^{3}	1
7	(Argentina) JI Londero	7^{7}	6
(Italy) L Sonego	6	6
(Argentina) F Delbonis	4	4
(Portugal) P Sousa	6^{3}	2
(Chile) C Garín	7^{7}	6
Q	(Brazil) P Sakamoto	3	2
6	(Spain) J Munar	6	6

Second round
1	(Portugal) J Sousa	3	4
(Norway) C Ruud	6	6
(Bolivia) H Dellien	6	7^{7}
7	(Argentina) JI Londero	4	6^{3}
4	(Argentina) L Mayer	6	3	6
(Italy) L Sonego	1	6	3
(Chile) C Garín	7^{7}	6^{4}	7^{7}
6	(Spain) J Munar	6^{5}	7^{7}	6^{2}

Quarterfinals
(Norway) C Ruud	6	6
(Bolivia) H Dellien	1	1
4	(Argentina) L Mayer	6	4	4
(Chile) C Garín	4	6	6

Semifinals
(Norway) C Ruud	4	4
(Chile) C Garín	6	6

=== Bottom half ===
First round
8	(Japan) T Daniel	4	6	6^{5}
(Argentina) M Trungelliti	6	3	7^{7}
WC	(Brazil) T Seyboth Wild	6	4	6
(Sweden) E Ymer	3	6	2
(Spain) R Carballés Baena	3	6	6
(Germany) M Marterer	6	1	2
5/WC	(Uruguay) P Cuevas	7	3	3
(Canada) F Auger-Aliassime	5	6	6
Q	(Argentina) F Bagnis	1	3
(Spain) A Ramos Viñolas	6	6
Q	(Italy) A Giannessi	6^{5}	6	4
(Serbia) L Đere	7^{7}	4	6

Second round
(Argentina) M Trungelliti	6	7
WC	(Brazil) T Seyboth Wild	4	5
(Spain) R Carballés Baena	2	4
3	(Argentina) G Pella	6	6
(Canada) F Auger-Aliassime	7^{7}	7^{7}
(Spain) A Ramos Viñolas	6^{2}	6^{5}
(Serbia) L Đere	6	3	7^{7}
2	(Tunisia) M Jaziri	3	6	6^{2}

Quarterfinals
(Argentina) M Trungelliti	0	3
3	(Argentina) G Pella	6	6
(Canada) F Auger-Aliassime	2	6	3
(Serbia) L Đere	6	3	6

Semifinals
3	(Argentina) G Pella	7^{12}	7^{7}
(Serbia) L Đere	6^{10}	6^{1}

== Qualifying ==
=== Seeds ===
1. (Argentina) Carlos Berlocq (qualifying competition)
2. (Argentina) Facundo Bagnis (qualified)
3. (Italy) Alessandro Giannessi (qualified)
4. (Spain) Pedro Martínez (qualified)
5. (Spain) Daniel Gimeno Traver (first round)
6. (Argentina) Facundo Argüello (first round)
7. (Belgium) Kimmer Coppejans (qualifying competition)
8. (Italy) Matteo Donati (first round)

=== Qualifiers ===
1. (Brazil) Pedro Sakamoto
2. (Argentina) Facundo Bagnis
3. (Italy) Alessandro Giannessi
4. (Spain) Pedro Martínez

=== Qualifying draw ===
==== First qualifier ====
First round
1	(Argentina) Carlos Berlocq	1	6	6
(Italy) Gian Marco Moroni	6	3	4
(Brazil) Pedro Sakamoto	6	6
8	(Italy) Matteo Donati	1	4

Qualifying competition
1	(Argentina) Carlos Berlocq	6^{4}	4
(Brazil) Pedro Sakamoto	7^{7}	6

==== Second qualifier ====
First round
2	(Argentina) Facundo Bagnis	6	6
(Russia) Alen Avidzba	1	4
(Slovakia) Andrej Martin	6	6
5	(Spain) Daniel Gimeno Traver	3	1

Qualifying competition
2	(Argentina) Facundo Bagnis	7^{7}	6
(Slovakia) Andrej Martin	6^{4}	2

==== Third qualifier ====
First round
3	(Italy) Alessandro Giannessi	7^{7}	6
WC	(Brazil) João Souza	6^{5}	3
(Portugal) João Domingues	6	0	3
7	(Belgium) Kimmer Coppejans	4	6	6

Qualifying competition
3	(Italy) Alessandro Giannessi	6	6
7	(Belgium) Kimmer Coppejans	4	2

==== Fourth qualifier ====
First round
4	(Spain) Pedro Martínez	7^{7}	6
WC	(Brazil) João Menezes	6^{4}	1
(Argentina) Federico Coria	6	6
6	(Argentina) Facundo Argüello	1	4

Qualifying competition
4	(Spain) Pedro Martínez	6	6
(Argentina) Federico Coria	1	1
