= 2019 Brasil Open – Doubles =

Doubles
- 2019 Brasil Open

Final
- Champions: (Argentina) Federico Delbonis (Argentina) Máximo González
- Runners-up: (United Kingdom) Luke Bambridge (United Kingdom) Jonny O'Mara
- Score: 6–4, 6–3

Details
- Draw: 16
- Seeds: 4

Events
Singles	Doubles
← 2018 ·	Brasil Open

Federico Delbonis and Máximo González were the defending champions and successfully defended the title, defeating Luke Bambridge and Jonny O'Mara in the final, 6–4, 6–3.

== Seeds ==
1. (Uruguay) Pablo Cuevas / (Argentina) Horacio Zeballos (quarterfinals)
2. (Argentina) Leonardo Mayer / (Portugal) João Sousa (first round)
3. (Czech Republic) Roman Jebavý / (Argentina) Andrés Molteni (semifinals)
4. (United Kingdom) Luke Bambridge / (United Kingdom) Jonny O'Mara (final)

== Draw ==
=== Key ===
- Q = Qualifier
- WC = Wild card
- LL = Lucky loser
- Alt = Alternate
- ITF = ITF entry
- PR = Protected ranking
- SR = Special ranking
- SE = Special exempt
- JE = Junior exempt
- JR = Junior Accelerator Programme entrant
- CO = College Accelerator Programme entrant
- NG = Next Gen Accelerator Program entrant
- w/o = Walkover
- r = Retired
- d = Defaulted

=== Draw ===
First round
1	(Uruguay) P Cuevas (Argentina) H Zeballos	7	6
(Brazil) M Demoliner (Denmark) F Nielsen	5	4
(Spain) D Marrero (Austria) P Oswald	4	4
(Argentina) F Delbonis (Argentina) M González	6	6
3	(Czech Republic) R Jebavý (Argentina) A Molteni	6	6
(Spain) R Carballés Baena (Tunisia) M Jaziri	0	3
(Germany) M Marterer (Germany) A Mies	6^{11}	6	[10]
WC	(Brazil) I Marcondes (Brazil) R Matos	7^{13}	0	[6]
(Belgium) S Gillé (Belgium) J Vliegen	6	5	[10]
(Argentina) G Durán (Argentina) JI Londero	4	7	[5]
(Bolivia) H Dellien (Argentina) G Pella	4	5
4	(United Kingdom) L Bambridge (United Kingdom) J O'Mara	6	7
(Monaco) R Arneodo (France) H Nys	5	4
(El Salvador) M Arévalo (United States) J Cerretani	7	6
WC	(Brazil) T Bellucci (Brazil) R Dutra Silva	6^{3}	7^{7}	[12]
2	(Argentina) L Mayer (Portugal) J Sousa	7^{7}	6^{4}	[10]

Quarterfinals
1	(Uruguay) P Cuevas (Argentina) H Zeballos	4	6^{4}
(Argentina) F Delbonis (Argentina) M González	6	7^{7}
3	(Czech Republic) R Jebavý (Argentina) A Molteni	6	6
(Germany) M Marterer (Germany) A Mies	4	2
(Belgium) S Gillé (Belgium) J Vliegen	4	4
4	(United Kingdom) L Bambridge (United Kingdom) J O'Mara	6	6
(El Salvador) M Arévalo (United States) J Cerretani	6	4	[6]
WC	(Brazil) T Bellucci (Brazil) R Dutra Silva	4	6	[10]

Semifinals
(Argentina) F Delbonis (Argentina) M González	7^{7}	6
3	(Czech Republic) R Jebavý (Argentina) A Molteni	6^{4}	4
4	(United Kingdom) L Bambridge (United Kingdom) J O'Mara	3	6	[10]
WC	(Brazil) T Bellucci (Brazil) R Dutra Silva	6	4	[5]

Final
(Argentina) F Delbonis (Argentina) M González	6	6
4	(United Kingdom) L Bambridge (United Kingdom) J O'Mara	4	3
