= 2019 Novak Djokovic tennis season =

- Full name: Novak Djokovic
- Country: Serbia
- Calendar prize money: $13,372,355 (singles & doubles)

Singles
- Season record: 57–11
- Calendar titles: 5
- Year-end ranking: No. 2
- Ranking change from previous year: ▼1

Grand Slam & significant results
- Australian Open: W
- French Open: SF
- Wimbledon: W
- US Open: 4R
- Other tournaments
- Tour Finals: RR

Doubles
- Season record: 6–7
- Current ranking: No. 139
- Year-end ranking: ▲129

Injuries
- Injuries: Left shoulder injury (following US Open)

The 2019 Novak Djokovic tennis season began on 1 January 2019, in the first round of the Qatar Open, and ended 22 November 2019 after Serbia defeat by Russia in the quarterfinals of the Davis Cup Finals.

== Yearly summary ==
=== Early hard court season ===
==== Qatar Open ====
Djokovic's first official tournament was the Qatar Open. He reached the semifinals by defeating Damir Džumhur, Márton Fucsovics and Nikoloz Basilashvili, but lost in three sets to eventual champion Roberto Bautista Agut.

==== Australian Open ====
Djokovic entered the Australian Open as the top seed. He defeated qualifier Mitchell Krueger, 2008 finalist Jo-Wilfried Tsonga, 25th seed Denis Shapovalov, 15th seed Daniil Medvedev, 8th seed Kei Nishikori, and 28th seed Lucas Pouille to reach the final, in which he beat 2nd seed Rafael Nadal in straight sets to win his 15th Major and a record 7th Australian Open.

==== Indian Wells Open ====
Djokovic's next tournament was the Indian Wells Open, where he received a first round bye along with 31 seeded players. He won his first match since Australian Open title against Bjorn Fratangelo, but was defeated in two sets by Philipp Kohlschreiber in the third round.

==== Miami Open ====
After his early exit at Indian Wells, Djokovic played at the Miami Open where he had previously won six times. After defeating Bernard Tomic and Federico Delbonis, Djokovic faced Roberto Bautista Agut. Djokovic won the first set and went a break up in second set, before a rain delay that seemingly disrupted his momentum. Djokovic eventually lost the match in three sets. After 41 straight wins, it was the first time Djokovic had lost in Miami after winning the first set. After the match, Djokovic admitted being affected by off-court distractions during the tournament.

=== Clay court season ===
==== Monte-Carlo Masters ====
Djokovic's clay court season commenced at the Monte Carlo Masters, which was played in the third week of April. Djokovic received an opening round bye, and made his clay court debut against Philipp Kohlschreiber in the second round, which he won in three tight sets. He reached the quarterfinals, where he lost to Daniil Medvedev in three sets.

==== Madrid Open ====
Djokovic followed his Monte Carlo quarterfinal run with a record-tying 33rd Masters 1000 title at the Madrid Open, defeating Stefanos Tsitsipas in the finals. Djokovic won the tournament without dropping a set, securing his third career title at the event.

==== Italian Open ====
At the 2019 Italian Open, Djokovic defeated Denis Shapovalov and Philipp Kohlschreiber in straight sets to progress to the quarterfinals. In his next match, Djokovic had to fend off two match points to prevail over Juan Martin del Potro in three sets. In the semifinals, Djokovic defeated Diego Schwartzman in three sets to progress to the finals, where he faced his rival Rafael Nadal for the first time since the 2019 Australian Open. Their 54th encounter saw Nadal prevailing over Djokovic in three sets, that included a bagel in the first set.

==== French Open ====
Djokovic entered the French Open aiming to win a fourth straight grand slam title, and becoming the first man in Open Era to win all four grand slams at least twice. He breezed through the tournament and reached the semifinals without dropping a set, after defeating Alexander Zverev in the quarterfinals. In the semifinals, he narrowly lost to Dominic Thiem in a close five set match which lasted two days due to numerous rain delays, ending his 26-match winning streak in grand slam tournaments.

=== Grass court season ===
==== Wimbledon ====
At Wimbledon, he won his sixteenth Grand Slam, defending his title to win the tournament for a fifth time by defeating Roger Federer in an epic five set final that lasted four hours and fifty seven minutes, the longest in Wimbledon history. Djokovic saved two championship points in the fifth set en route to winning the title and the match also marked the first time a fifth set tiebreak was played in the men's singles of Wimbledon at 12 games all.

=== North American hard court season ===
==== Cincinnati Open ====
Djokovic played his US open warm up in Cincinnati. He got a bye to the second round and then beat American Sam Querrey, Spain's Pablo Carreno Busta and France's Lucas Pouille, all in straight sets. In the semifinals however, he was defeated by Russia's Daniil Medvedev in 3 sets after Djokovic was up a set. Medvedev went on to win the title.

==== US Open ====
At the US Open, Djokovic was unable to defend his title, falling to Stan Wawrinka in the fourth round, while down two sets and a break before retiring due to injury. The defeat prevented Djokovic from sweeping three of the four Grand Slams that year, a feat that he achieved in 2011 and 2015.

=== Fall hard court season ===
==== Japan Open ====
Novak Djokovic won his first Japan Open title and the 76th of his career with a 6–3 6–2 win over Australian John Millman in the final in Tokyo on Oct 06. 2019. It was a triumphant return for Djokovic after his shoulder injury causing him to withdraw from the U.S. Open in the fourth round.

==== Shanghai Masters ====
Djokovic entered Shanghai Masters as top seed and defending champion but could not defend his title. He defeated Denis Shapovalov in second round and John Isner in third round in straight sets to enter quarter-finals. He lost in quarter-finals to Stefanos Tsitsipas in three sets 6–3, 5–7, 3–6.

=== European indoor hard court season ===
==== Paris Masters ====
Djokovic started his campaign with a tough victory over Frenchman Corentin Moutet. From then on, he beat Brit Kyle Edmund, Stefanos Tsitsipas (for the loss of only three games), Grigor Dimitrov and Denis Shapovalov in the final. He did not lose a set in the tournament and clinched a record-extending fifth title in Paris-Bercy.

==== ATP Finals ====
Djokovic was placed in the Bjorn Borg group, along with Roger Federer, Dominic Thiem and Matteo Berrettini. He started off with a convincing straight sets win over Berrettini, but lost narrowly to Thiem in a third set tiebreak and to Federer in straight sets, losing the opportunity to finish as the year-end number 1.

==== Davis Cup Finals ====
Djokovic helped Serbia to win their group with victories over Yoshihito Nishioka and Benoit Paire, as the country went 5–1 in their matches. In the quarterfinals against Russia, Djokovic won the second rubber against Karen Khachanov but could not avoid the defeat, as he and Viktor Troicki lost a pivotal doubles match to the Russian pair of Khachanov and Rublev.

== All matches ==
This table lists all the matches of Djokovic this year, including walkovers (W/O)

Key
W	F	SF	QF	#R	RR	Q#	P#	DNQ	A	Z#	PO	G	S	B	NMS	NTI	P	NH

(W) winner; (F) finalist; (SF) semifinalist; (QF) quarterfinalist; (#R) rounds 4, 3, 2, 1; (RR) round-robin stage; (Q#) qualification round; (P#) preliminary round; (DNQ) did not qualify; (A) absent; (Z#) Davis/Fed Cup Zonal Group (with number indication) or (PO) play-off; (G) gold, (S) silver or (B) bronze Olympic/Paralympic medal; (NMS) not a Masters tournament; (NTI) not a Tier I tournament; (P) postponed; (NH) not held; (SR) strike rate (events won / competed); (W–L) win–loss record.
To avoid confusion and double counting, these charts are updated at the conclusion of a tournament or when the player's participation has ended.

=== Singles matches ===
Tournament	Match	Round	Opponent (seed or key)	Rank	Result	Score
Qatar Open; Doha, Qatar; ATP 250; Hard, outdoor 31 December 2018 – 5 January 2019
Qatar Open; Doha, Qatar; ATP 250; Hard, outdoor 31 December 2018 – 5 January 2019	1 / 1013	1R	(Bosnia and Herzegovina) Damir Džumhur	45	Win	6–1, 6–2
Qatar Open; Doha, Qatar; ATP 250; Hard, outdoor 31 December 2018 – 5 January 2019	2 / 1014	2R	(Hungary) Márton Fucsovics	36	Win	4–6, 6–4, 6–1
Qatar Open; Doha, Qatar; ATP 250; Hard, outdoor 31 December 2018 – 5 January 2019	3 / 1015	QF	(Georgia (country)) Nikoloz Basilashvili (5)	21	Win	4–6, 6–3, 6–4
Qatar Open; Doha, Qatar; ATP 250; Hard, outdoor 31 December 2018 – 5 January 2019	4 / 1016	SF	(Spain) Roberto Bautista Agut (7)	24	Loss	6–3, 6–7^{(6–8)}, 4–6
Australian Open; Melbourne, Australia; Grand Slam tournament Hard, outdoor 14 – 27 January 2019
Australian Open; Melbourne, Australia; Grand Slam tournament Hard, outdoor 14 – 27 January 2019	5 / 1017	1R	(United States) Mitchell Krueger (Q)	230	Win	6–3, 6–2, 6–2
Australian Open; Melbourne, Australia; Grand Slam tournament Hard, outdoor 14 – 27 January 2019	6 / 1018	2R	(France) Jo-Wilfried Tsonga (WC)	177	Win	6–3, 7–5, 6–4
Australian Open; Melbourne, Australia; Grand Slam tournament Hard, outdoor 14 – 27 January 2019	7 / 1019	3R	(Canada) Denis Shapovalov (25)	27	Win	6–3, 6–4, 4–6, 6–0
Australian Open; Melbourne, Australia; Grand Slam tournament Hard, outdoor 14 – 27 January 2019	8 / 1020	4R	(Russia) Daniil Medvedev (15)	19	Win	6–4, 6–7^{(5–7)}, 6–2, 6–3
Australian Open; Melbourne, Australia; Grand Slam tournament Hard, outdoor 14 – 27 January 2019	9 / 1021	QF	(Japan) Kei Nishikori (8)	9	Win	6–1, 4–1, ret.
Australian Open; Melbourne, Australia; Grand Slam tournament Hard, outdoor 14 – 27 January 2019	10 / 1022	SF	(France) Lucas Pouille (28)	31	Win	6–0, 6–2, 6–2
Australian Open; Melbourne, Australia; Grand Slam tournament Hard, outdoor 14 – 27 January 2019	11 / 1023	W	(Spain) Rafael Nadal (2)	2	Win (1)	6–3, 6–2, 6–3
Indian Wells Masters; Indian Wells, United States; ATP 1000; Hard, outdoor 4 – 17 March 2019
Indian Wells Masters; Indian Wells, United States; ATP 1000; Hard, outdoor 4 – 17 March 2019	–	1R	Bye			
Indian Wells Masters; Indian Wells, United States; ATP 1000; Hard, outdoor 4 – 17 March 2019	12 / 1024	2R	(United States) Bjorn Fratangelo (Q)	128	Win	7–6^{(7–5)}, 6–2
Indian Wells Masters; Indian Wells, United States; ATP 1000; Hard, outdoor 4 – 17 March 2019	13 / 1025	3R	(Germany) Philipp Kohlschreiber	39	Loss	4–6, 4–6
Miami Open; Miami, United States; ATP 1000; Hard, outdoor 18–31 March 2019
Miami Open; Miami, United States; ATP 1000; Hard, outdoor 18–31 March 2019	–	1R	Bye			
Miami Open; Miami, United States; ATP 1000; Hard, outdoor 18–31 March 2019	14 / 1026	2R	(Australia) Bernard Tomic	81	Win	7–6^{(7–2)}, 6–2
Miami Open; Miami, United States; ATP 1000; Hard, outdoor 18–31 March 2019	15 / 1027	3R	(Argentina) Federico Delbonis	83	Win	7–5, 4–6, 6–1
Miami Open; Miami, United States; ATP 1000; Hard, outdoor 18–31 March 2019	16 / 1028	4R	(Spain) Roberto Bautista Agut (22)	25	Loss	6–1, 5–7, 3–6
Monte-Carlo Masters; Monte Carlo, Monaco; ATP 1000; Clay, outdoor 14 – 21 April 2019
Monte-Carlo Masters; Monte Carlo, Monaco; ATP 1000; Clay, outdoor 14 – 21 April 2019	–	1R	Bye			
Monte-Carlo Masters; Monte Carlo, Monaco; ATP 1000; Clay, outdoor 14 – 21 April 2019	17 / 1029	2R	(Germany) Philipp Kohlschreiber	40	Win	6–3, 4–6, 6–4
Monte-Carlo Masters; Monte Carlo, Monaco; ATP 1000; Clay, outdoor 14 – 21 April 2019	18 / 1030	3R	(United States) Taylor Fritz	65	Win	6–3, 6–0
Monte-Carlo Masters; Monte Carlo, Monaco; ATP 1000; Clay, outdoor 14 – 21 April 2019	19 / 1031	QF	(Russia) Daniil Medvedev (10)	14	Loss	3–6, 6–4, 2–6
Madrid Open; Madrid, Spain; ATP 1000; Clay, outdoor 5 – 12 May 2019
Madrid Open; Madrid, Spain; ATP 1000; Clay, outdoor 5 – 12 May 2019	–	1R	Bye			
Madrid Open; Madrid, Spain; ATP 1000; Clay, outdoor 5 – 12 May 2019	20 / 1032	2R	(United States) Taylor Fritz (Q)	57	Win	6–4, 6–2
Madrid Open; Madrid, Spain; ATP 1000; Clay, outdoor 5 – 12 May 2019	21 / 1033	3R	(France) Jérémy Chardy	47	Win	6–1, 7–6^{(7–2)}
Madrid Open; Madrid, Spain; ATP 1000; Clay, outdoor 5 – 12 May 2019	–	QF	(Croatia) Marin Čilić (9)	11	W/O	N/A
Madrid Open; Madrid, Spain; ATP 1000; Clay, outdoor 5 – 12 May 2019	22 / 1034	SF	(Austria) Dominic Thiem (5)	5	Win	7–6^{(7–2)}, 7–6^{(7–4)}
Madrid Open; Madrid, Spain; ATP 1000; Clay, outdoor 5 – 12 May 2019	23 / 1035	W	(Greece) Stefanos Tsitsipas (8)	9	Win (2)	6–3, 6–4
Italian Open; Rome, Italy; ATP 1000; Clay, outdoor 12 – 19 May 2019
Italian Open; Rome, Italy; ATP 1000; Clay, outdoor 12 – 19 May 2019	–	1R	Bye			
Italian Open; Rome, Italy; ATP 1000; Clay, outdoor 12 – 19 May 2019	24 / 1036	2R	(Canada) Denis Shapovalov	22	Win	6–1, 6–3
Italian Open; Rome, Italy; ATP 1000; Clay, outdoor 12 – 19 May 2019	25 / 1037	3R	(Germany) Philipp Kohlschreiber	56	Win	6–3, 6–0
Italian Open; Rome, Italy; ATP 1000; Clay, outdoor 12 – 19 May 2019	26 / 1038	QF	(Argentina) Juan Martín del Potro (7)	9	Win	4–6, 7–6^{(8–6)}, 6–4
Italian Open; Rome, Italy; ATP 1000; Clay, outdoor 12 – 19 May 2019	27 / 1039	SF	(Argentina) Diego Schwartzman	24	Win	6–3, 6–7^{(2–7)}, 6–3
Italian Open; Rome, Italy; ATP 1000; Clay, outdoor 12 – 19 May 2019	28 / 1040	F	(Spain) Rafael Nadal (2)	2	Loss	0–6, 6–4, 1–6
French Open; Paris, France; Grand Slam tournament Clay, outdoor 27 May – 9 June 2019
French Open; Paris, France; Grand Slam tournament Clay, outdoor 27 May – 9 June 2019	29 / 1041	1R	(Poland) Hubert Hurkacz	44	Win	6–4, 6–2, 6–2
French Open; Paris, France; Grand Slam tournament Clay, outdoor 27 May – 9 June 2019	30 / 1042	2R	(Switzerland) Henri Laaksonen (LL)	104	Win	6–1, 6–4, 6–3
French Open; Paris, France; Grand Slam tournament Clay, outdoor 27 May – 9 June 2019	31 / 1043	3R	(Italy) Salvatore Caruso (Q)	147	Win	6–3, 6–3, 6–2
French Open; Paris, France; Grand Slam tournament Clay, outdoor 27 May – 9 June 2019	32 / 1044	4R	(Germany) Jan-Lennard Struff	45	Win	6–3, 6–2, 6–2
French Open; Paris, France; Grand Slam tournament Clay, outdoor 27 May – 9 June 2019	33 / 1045	QF	(Germany) Alexander Zverev (5)	5	Win	7–5, 6–2, 6–2
French Open; Paris, France; Grand Slam tournament Clay, outdoor 27 May – 9 June 2019	34 / 1046	SF	(Austria) Dominic Thiem (4)	4	Loss	2–6, 6–3, 5–7, 7–5, 5–7
Wimbledon Championships; London, United Kingdom; Grand Slam tournament Grass, outdoor 1 – 14 July 2019
Wimbledon Championships; London, United Kingdom; Grand Slam tournament Grass, outdoor 1 – 14 July 2019	35 / 1047	1R	(Germany) Philipp Kohlschreiber	57	Win	6–3, 7–5, 6–3
Wimbledon Championships; London, United Kingdom; Grand Slam tournament Grass, outdoor 1 – 14 July 2019	36 / 1048	2R	(United States) Denis Kudla	111	Win	6–3, 6–2, 6–2
Wimbledon Championships; London, United Kingdom; Grand Slam tournament Grass, outdoor 1 – 14 July 2019	37 / 1049	3R	(Poland) Hubert Hurkacz	48	Win	7–5, 6–7^{(5–7)}, 6–1, 6–4
Wimbledon Championships; London, United Kingdom; Grand Slam tournament Grass, outdoor 1 – 14 July 2019	38 / 1050	4R	(France) Ugo Humbert	66	Win	6–3, 6–2, 6–3
Wimbledon Championships; London, United Kingdom; Grand Slam tournament Grass, outdoor 1 – 14 July 2019	39 / 1051	QF	(Belgium) David Goffin (21)	23	Win	6–4, 6–0, 6–2
Wimbledon Championships; London, United Kingdom; Grand Slam tournament Grass, outdoor 1 – 14 July 2019	40 / 1052	SF	(Spain) Roberto Bautista Agut (23)	22	Win	6–2, 4–6, 6–3, 6–2
Wimbledon Championships; London, United Kingdom; Grand Slam tournament Grass, outdoor 1 – 14 July 2019	41 / 1053	W	(Switzerland) Roger Federer (2)	3	Win (3)	7–6^{(7–5)}, 1–6, 7–6^{(7–4)}, 4–6, 13–12^{(7–3)}
Cincinnati Masters; Cincinnati, United States; ATP 1000; Hard, outdoor 12 – 18 August 2019
Cincinnati Masters; Cincinnati, United States; ATP 1000; Hard, outdoor 12 – 18 August 2019	–	1R	Bye			
Cincinnati Masters; Cincinnati, United States; ATP 1000; Hard, outdoor 12 – 18 August 2019	42 / 1054	2R	(United States) Sam Querrey (WC)	45	Win	7–5, 6–1
Cincinnati Masters; Cincinnati, United States; ATP 1000; Hard, outdoor 12 – 18 August 2019	43 / 1055	3R	(Spain) Pablo Carreño Busta (Q)	53	Win	6–3, 6–4
Cincinnati Masters; Cincinnati, United States; ATP 1000; Hard, outdoor 12 – 18 August 2019	44 / 1056	QF	(France) Lucas Pouille	31	Win	7–6^{(7–1)}, 6–1
Cincinnati Masters; Cincinnati, United States; ATP 1000; Hard, outdoor 12 – 18 August 2019	45 / 1057	SF	(Russia) Daniil Medvedev (9)	8	Loss	6–3, 3–6, 3–6
US Open; New York City, United States; Grand Slam tournament Hard, outdoor 26 August – 8 September 2019
US Open; New York City, United States; Grand Slam tournament Hard, outdoor 26 August – 8 September 2019	46 / 1058	1R	(Spain) Roberto Carballés Baena	76	Win	6–4, 6–1, 6–4
US Open; New York City, United States; Grand Slam tournament Hard, outdoor 26 August – 8 September 2019	47 / 1059	2R	(Argentina) Juan Ignacio Londero	56	Win	6–4, 7–6^{(7–3)}, 6–1
US Open; New York City, United States; Grand Slam tournament Hard, outdoor 26 August – 8 September 2019	48 / 1060	3R	(United States) Denis Kudla	111	Win	6–3, 6–4, 6–2
US Open; New York City, United States; Grand Slam tournament Hard, outdoor 26 August – 8 September 2019	49 / 1061	4R	(Switzerland) Stan Wawrinka (23)	24	Loss	4–6, 5–7, 1–2 ret.
Japan Open; Tokyo, Japan; ATP 500; Hard, outdoor 30 September – 6 October 2019
Japan Open; Tokyo, Japan; ATP 500; Hard, outdoor 30 September – 6 October 2019	50 / 1062	1R	(Australia) Alexei Popyrin (Q)	94	Win	6–4, 6–2
Japan Open; Tokyo, Japan; ATP 500; Hard, outdoor 30 September – 6 October 2019	51 / 1063	2R	(Japan) Go Soeda (WC)	133	Win	6–3, 7–5
Japan Open; Tokyo, Japan; ATP 500; Hard, outdoor 30 September – 6 October 2019	52 / 1064	QF	(France) Lucas Pouille (5)	24	Win	6–1, 6–2
Japan Open; Tokyo, Japan; ATP 500; Hard, outdoor 30 September – 6 October 2019	53 / 1065	SF	(Belgium) David Goffin (3)	15	Win	6–3, 6–4
Japan Open; Tokyo, Japan; ATP 500; Hard, outdoor 30 September – 6 October 2019	54 / 1066	W	(Australia) John Millman (Q)	80	Win (4)	6–3, 6–2
Shanghai Masters; Shanghai, China; ATP 1000; Hard, outdoor 7 – 13 October 2019
Shanghai Masters; Shanghai, China; ATP 1000; Hard, outdoor 7 – 13 October 2019	–	1R	Bye			
Shanghai Masters; Shanghai, China; ATP 1000; Hard, outdoor 7 – 13 October 2019	55 / 1067	2R	(Canada) Denis Shapovalov	36	Win	6–3, 6–3
Shanghai Masters; Shanghai, China; ATP 1000; Hard, outdoor 7 – 13 October 2019	56 / 1068	3R	(United States) John Isner (16)	17	Win	7–5, 6–3
Shanghai Masters; Shanghai, China; ATP 1000; Hard, outdoor 7 – 13 October 2019	57 / 1069	QF	(Greece) Stefanos Tsitsipas (6)	7	Loss	6–3, 5–7, 3–6
Paris Masters; Paris, France; ATP 1000; Hard, indoor 28 October – 3 November 2019
Paris Masters; Paris, France; ATP 1000; Hard, indoor 28 October – 3 November 2019	–	1R	Bye			
Paris Masters; Paris, France; ATP 1000; Hard, indoor 28 October – 3 November 2019	58 / 1070	2R	(France) Corentin Moutet (LL)	97	Win	7–6^{(7–2)}, 6–4
Paris Masters; Paris, France; ATP 1000; Hard, indoor 28 October – 3 November 2019	59 / 1071	3R	(United Kingdom) Kyle Edmund	75	Win	7–6^{(9–7)}, 6–1
Paris Masters; Paris, France; ATP 1000; Hard, indoor 28 October – 3 November 2019	60 / 1072	QF	(Greece) Stefanos Tsitsipas (7)	7	Win	6–1, 6–2
Paris Masters; Paris, France; ATP 1000; Hard, indoor 28 October – 3 November 2019	61 / 1073	SF	(Bulgaria) Grigor Dimitrov	27	Win	7–6^{(7–5)}, 6–4
Paris Masters; Paris, France; ATP 1000; Hard, indoor 28 October – 3 November 2019	62 / 1074	W	(Canada) Denis Shapovalov	28	Win (5)	6–3, 6–4
ATP Finals; London, United Kingdom; ATP Finals; Hard, indoor 10 – 17 November 2019
ATP Finals; London, United Kingdom; ATP Finals; Hard, indoor 10 – 17 November 2019	63 / 1075	RR	(Italy) Matteo Berrettini (8)	8	Win	6–2, 6–1
ATP Finals; London, United Kingdom; ATP Finals; Hard, indoor 10 – 17 November 2019	64 / 1076	RR	(Austria) Dominic Thiem (5)	5	Loss	7–6^{(7–5)}, 3–6, 6–7^{(5–7)}
ATP Finals; London, United Kingdom; ATP Finals; Hard, indoor 10 – 17 November 2019	65 / 1077	RR	(Switzerland) Roger Federer (3)	3	Loss	4–6, 3–6
Davis Cup Finals; Madrid, Spain; Davis Cup; Hard, indoor 18 – 24 November 2019
Davis Cup Finals; Madrid, Spain; Davis Cup; Hard, indoor 18 – 24 November 2019	66 / 1078	RR	(Japan) Yoshihito Nishioka	73	Win	6–1, 6–2
Davis Cup Finals; Madrid, Spain; Davis Cup; Hard, indoor 18 – 24 November 2019	67 / 1079	RR	(France) Benoît Paire	24	Win	6–3, 6–3
Davis Cup Finals; Madrid, Spain; Davis Cup; Hard, indoor 18 – 24 November 2019	68 / 1080	QF	(Russia) Karen Khachanov	17	Win	6–3, 6–3

=== Doubles matches ===
Tournament	Match	Round	Opponents (seed or key)	Ranks	Result	Score
Qatar Open; Doha, Qatar; ATP 250; Hard, outdoor 31 December 2018 – 4 January 2019; Partner: (Serbia) Marko Djokovic
Qatar Open; Doha, Qatar; ATP 250; Hard, outdoor 31 December 2018 – 4 January 2019; Partner: (Serbia) Marko Djokovic	1 / 112	1R	(Turkey) Cem İlkel / (Qatar) Mubarak Shannan Zayid (WC)	323 / –	Win	6–3, 3–6, [10–6]
Qatar Open; Doha, Qatar; ATP 250; Hard, outdoor 31 December 2018 – 4 January 2019; Partner: (Serbia) Marko Djokovic	2 / 113	QF	(Bosnia and Herzegovina) Damir Džumhur / (Serbia) Dušan Lajović	148 / 240	Win	7–5, 3–6, [10–7]
Qatar Open; Doha, Qatar; ATP 250; Hard, outdoor 31 December 2018 – 4 January 2019; Partner: (Serbia) Marko Djokovic	3 / 114	SF	(Belgium) David Goffin / (France) Pierre-Hugues Herbert	354 / 12	Loss	1–6, 6–3, [13–15]
Indian Wells Masters; Indian Wells, United States; ATP 1000; Hard, outdoor 4–17 March 2019; Partner: (Italy) Fabio Fognini
Indian Wells Masters; Indian Wells, United States; ATP 1000; Hard, outdoor 4–17 March 2019; Partner: (Italy) Fabio Fognini	4 / 115	1R	(France) Jérémy Chardy / (Canada) Milos Raonic	75 / 450	Win	7–6^{(7–5)}, 6–1
Indian Wells Masters; Indian Wells, United States; ATP 1000; Hard, outdoor 4–17 March 2019; Partner: (Italy) Fabio Fognini	5 / 116	2R	(India) Rohan Bopanna / (Canada) Denis Shapovalov	38 / 304	Win	6–4, 1–6, [10–8]
Indian Wells Masters; Indian Wells, United States; ATP 1000; Hard, outdoor 4–17 March 2019; Partner: (Italy) Fabio Fognini	6 / 117	QF	(Netherlands) Jean-Julien Rojer / (Romania) Horia Tecău	22 / 33	Win	7–6^{(8–6)}, 2–6, [10–6]
Indian Wells Masters; Indian Wells, United States; ATP 1000; Hard, outdoor 4–17 March 2019; Partner: (Italy) Fabio Fognini	7 / 118	SF	(Poland) Łukasz Kubot / (Brazil) Marcelo Melo (6)	8 / 12	Loss	6–7^{(5–7)}, 6–2, [6–10]
Monte-Carlo Masters; Monte Carlo, Monaco; ATP 1000; Clay, outdoor 14 – 21 April 2019; Partner: (Serbia) Marko Djokovic
Monte-Carlo Masters; Monte Carlo, Monaco; ATP 1000; Clay, outdoor 14 – 21 April 2019; Partner: (Serbia) Marko Djokovic	8 / 119	1R	(Colombia) Juan Sebastián Cabal / (Colombia) Robert Farah (4)	11 / 11	Loss	1–6, 3–6
Cincinnati Masters; Cincinnati, United States; ATP 1000; Hard, outdoor 12 – 18 August 2019; Partner: (Serbia) Janko Tipsarević
Cincinnati Masters; Cincinnati, United States; ATP 1000; Hard, outdoor 12 – 18 August 2019; Partner: (Serbia) Janko Tipsarević	9 / 120	1R	(Poland) Łukasz Kubot / (Brazil) Marcelo Melo (2)	4 / 5	Loss	2–6, 3–6
Japan Open; Tokyo, Japan; ATP 500; Hard, outdoor 30 September – 6 October 2019; Partner: (Serbia) Filip Krajinović
Japan Open; Tokyo, Japan; ATP 500; Hard, outdoor 30 September – 6 October 2019; Partner: (Serbia) Filip Krajinović	10 / 121	1R	(Croatia) Mate Pavić / (Brazil) Bruno Soares (4)	18 / 21	Loss	2–6, 6–4, [4–10]
Shanghai Masters; Shanghai, China; ATP 1000; Hard, outdoor 7 – 13 October 2019; Partner: (Serbia) Filip Krajinović
Shanghai Masters; Shanghai, China; ATP 1000; Hard, outdoor 7 – 13 October 2019; Partner: (Serbia) Filip Krajinović	11 / 122	1R	(Germany) Kevin Krawietz / (Germany) Andreas Mies (5)	12 / 14	Win	6–3, 3–6, [10–3]
Shanghai Masters; Shanghai, China; ATP 1000; Hard, outdoor 7 – 13 October 2019; Partner: (Serbia) Filip Krajinović	12 / 123	2R	(United Kingdom) Jamie Murray / (United Kingdom) Neal Skupski	10 / 31	Loss	3–6, 2–6
Davis Cup Finals; Madrid, Spain; Davis Cup; Hard, indoor 18 – 24 November 2019; Partner: (Serbia) Viktor Troicki
Davis Cup Finals; Madrid, Spain; Davis Cup; Hard, indoor 18 – 24 November 2019; Partner: (Serbia) Viktor Troicki	13 / 124	QF	(Russia) Karen Khachanov / (Russia) Andrey Rublev	86 / 75	Loss	4–6, 6–4, 6–7^{(8–10)}

== Exhibition matches ==
=== Singles ===
Tournament	Match	Round	Opponent (seed or key)	Rank	Result	Score
2018 World Tennis Championship; Abu Dhabi, United Arab Emirates Hard, outdoor 27 – 29 December 2018
2018 World Tennis Championship; Abu Dhabi, United Arab Emirates Hard, outdoor 27 – 29 December 2018	–	QF	Bye			
2018 World Tennis Championship; Abu Dhabi, United Arab Emirates Hard, outdoor 27 – 29 December 2018	1	SF	(Russia) Karen Khachanov (5)	11	Win	6–4, 6–2
2018 World Tennis Championship; Abu Dhabi, United Arab Emirates Hard, outdoor 27 – 29 December 2018	2	W	(South Africa) Kevin Anderson (3)	6	Win	4–6, 7–5, 7–5
2019 Boodles Challenge; Stoke Poges, England, United Kingdom Grass, outdoor 25 – 26 June 2019
2019 Boodles Challenge; Stoke Poges, England, United Kingdom Grass, outdoor 25 – 26 June 2019	3	–	(Chile) Cristian Garín	35	Win	6–2, 6–4
2019 Boodles Challenge; Stoke Poges, England, United Kingdom Grass, outdoor 25 – 26 June 2019	4	–	(Canada) Denis Shapovalov	27	Loss	6–7^{(3–7)}, 4–6
Kazakhstan charity exhibition match Nur-Sultan, Kazakhstan Hard, indoor 24 October 2019
Kazakhstan charity exhibition match Nur-Sultan, Kazakhstan Hard, indoor 24 October 2019	5	–	(Spain) Rafael Nadal	2	Loss	3–6, 6–3, [9–11]

=== Doubles ===
Tournament	Match	Round	Opponents (seed or key)	Ranks	Result	Score
Indian Wells Masters; Indian Wells, United States Hard, outdoor 16 March 2019; Partner: (United States) Pete Sampras
Indian Wells Masters; Indian Wells, United States Hard, outdoor 16 March 2019; Partner: (United States) Pete Sampras	1	–	(Germany) Tommy Haas / (United States) John McEnroe	– / –	Loss	3–4^{(4–7)}

== Schedule ==
Per Novak Djokovic, this is his current 2019 schedule (subject to change).

=== Singles schedule ===
Date	Tournament	Location	Tier	Surface	Prev. result	Prev. points	New points	Result
31 December 2018– 5 January 2019	Qatar Open	Doha (QAT)	250 Series	Hard	A	N/A	90	Semifinals (lost to Roberto Bautista Agut, 6–3, 6–7^{(6–8)}, 4–6)
14 January 2019– 27 January 2019	Australian Open	Melbourne (AUS)	Grand Slam	Hard	4R	180	2000	Champion (defeated Rafael Nadal, 6–3, 6–2, 6–3)
4 March 2019– 17 March 2019	Indian Wells Masters	Indian Wells (USA)	Masters 1000	Hard	2R	10	45	Third round (lost to Philipp Kohlschreiber, 4–6, 4–6)
18 March 2019– 31 March 2019	Miami Open	Miami (USA)	Masters 1000	Hard	2R	10	90	Fourth round (lost to Roberto Bautista Agut, 6–1, 5–7, 3–6)
14 April 2019– 21 April 2019	Monte-Carlo Masters	Monte Carlo (MON)	Masters 1000	Clay	3R	90	180	Quarterfinals (lost to Daniil Medvedev 3–6, 6–4, 2–6)
5 May 2019– 12 May 2019	Madrid Open	Madrid (ESP)	Masters 1000	Clay	2R	45	1000	Champion (defeated Stefanos Tsitsipas, 6–3, 6–4)
13 May 2019– 19 May 2019	Italian Open	Rome (ITA)	Masters 1000	Clay	SF	360	600	Final (lost to Rafael Nadal, 0–6, 6–4, 1–6)
27 May 2019– 9 June 2019	French Open	Paris (FRA)	Grand Slam	Clay	QF	360	720	Semifinals (lost to Dominic Thiem, 2–6, 6–3, 5–7, 7–5, 5–7)
17 June 2019– 23 June 2019	Queen's Club	London (GBR)	500 Series	Grass	F	300	0	Withdrew
1 July 2019– 14 July 2019	Wimbledon	London (GBR)	Grand Slam	Grass	W	2000	2000	Champion (defeated Roger Federer, 7–6^{(7–5)}, 1–6, 7–6^{(7–4)}, 4–6, 13–12^{(7–3)})
5 Aug 2019– 12 Aug 2019	Canadian Open	Toronto (CAN)	Masters 1000	Hard	3R	90	0	Withdrew
12 Aug 2019– 18 Aug 2019	Cincinnati Masters	Cincinnati (USA)	Masters 1000	Hard	W	1000	360	Semifinals (lost to Daniil Medvedev, 6–3, 3–6, 3–6)
26 August 2019– 8 September 2019	US Open	New York (USA)	Grand Slam	Hard	W	2000	180	Fourth round (lost to Stan Wawrinka, 4–6, 5–7, 1–2, ret.)
30 September 2019– 6 October 2019	Japan Open	Tokyo (JAP)	500 Series	Hard	A	N/A	500	Champion (defeated John Millman, 6–3, 6–2)
6 October 2019– 13 October 2019	Shanghai Masters	Shanghai (CHN)	Masters 1000	Hard	W	1000	180	Quarterfinals (lost to Stefanos Tsitsipas 6–3, 5–7, 3–6)
28 October 2019– 3 November 2019	Paris Masters	Paris (FRA)	Masters 1000	Hard (i)	F	600	1000	Champion (defeated Denis Shapovalov, 6–3, 6–4)
10 November 2019– 17 November 2019	ATP Finals	London (GBR)	Tour Finals	Hard (i)	F	1000	200	Round robin (1 win – 2 losses)
18 November 2019– 24 November 2019	Davis Cup Finals	Madrid (ESP)	Davis Cup	Hard (i)	QF	N/A	N/A	Quarterfinals (lost to Russia 1–2)
Total year-end points						9045	9145	▲100 difference

=== Doubles schedule ===
Date	Tournament	Location	Tier	Surface	Prev. result	Prev. points	New points	Result
31 December 2018– 4 January 2019	Qatar Open	Doha (QAT)	250 Series	Hard	A	N/A	90	Semifinals (lost to Goffin / Herbert, 1–6, 6–3, [13–15])
4 March 2019– 17 March 2019	Indian Wells Masters	Indian Wells (USA)	Masters 1000	Hard	A	N/A	360	Semifinals (lost to Kubot / Melo, 6–7^{(5–7)}, 6–2, [6–10])
14 April 2019– 21 April 2019	Monte-Carlo Masters	Monte Carlo (MON)	Masters 1000	Clay	A	N/A	0	First round (lost to Cabal / Farah, 1–6, 3–6)
5 August 2019– 11 August 2019	Canadian Open	Toronto (CAN)	Masters 1000	Hard	QF	180	0	Withdrew
12 August 2019– 18 August 2019	Cincinnati Masters	Cincinnati (USA)	Masters 1000	Hard	A	N/A	0	First round (lost to Kubot / Melo, 2–6, 3–6)
30 September 2019– 6 October 2019	Japan Open	Tokyo (JAP)	500 Series	Hard	A	N/A	0	First round (lost to Pavić / Soares, 2–6, 6–4, [4–10])
6 October 2019– 13 October 2019	Shanghai Masters	Shanghai (CHN)	Masters 1000	Hard	A	N/A	90	Second round (lost to Murray / Skupski, 3–6, 5–6)
18 November 2019– 24 November 2019	Davis Cup Finals	Madrid (ESP)	Davis Cup	Hard (i)	N/A	N/A	N/A	Quarterfinals (lost to Russia 1–2)
Total year-end points						180	540	▲360 difference

== Yearly records ==
=== Head-to-head matchups ===
Novak Djokovic has a 57–11 ATP match win–loss record in the 2019 season. His record against players who were part of the ATP rankings Top Ten at the time of their meetings is 9–6. Bold indicates player was ranked top 10 at the time of at least one meeting. The following list is ordered by number of wins:

- (Canada) Denis Shapovalov 4–0
- (France) Lucas Pouille 3–0
- (Germany) Philipp Kohlschreiber 3–1
- (United States) Taylor Fritz 2–0
- (Belgium) David Goffin 2–0
- (Poland) Hubert Hurkacz 2–0
- (United States) Denis Kudla 2–0
- (Greece) **Stefanos Tsitsipas** 2–1
- (Georgia (country)) Nikoloz Basilashvili 1–0
- (Italy) Salvatore Caruso 1–0
- (Spain) Roberto Carballés Baena 1–0
- (Italy) **Matteo Berrettini** 1–0
- (Spain) Pablo Carreño Busta 1–0
- (France) Jérémy Chardy 1–0
- (Argentina) **Juan Martín del Potro** 1–0
- (Argentina) Federico Delbonis 1–0
- (Bulgaria) Grigor Dimitrov 1–0
- (Bosnia and Herzegovina) Damir Džumhur 1–0
- (United Kingdom) Kyle Edmund 1–0
- (United States) Bjorn Fratangelo 1–0
- (Hungary) Márton Fucsovics 1–0
- (France) Ugo Humbert 1–0
- (United States) John Isner 1–0
- (Russia) Karen Khachanov 1–0
- (United States) Mitchell Krueger 1–0
- (Switzerland) Henri Laaksonen 1–0
- (Argentina) Juan Ignacio Londero 1–0
- (Australia) John Millman 1–0
- (France) Corentin Moutet 1–0
- (Japan) Yoshihito Nishioka 1–0
- (Japan) **Kei Nishikori** 1–0
- (France) Benoît Paire 1–0
- (Australia) Alexei Popyrin 1–0
- (United States) Sam Querrey 1–0
- (Argentina) Diego Schwartzman 1–0
- (Japan) Go Soeda 1–0
- (Germany) Jan-Lennard Struff 1–0
- (Australia) Bernard Tomic 1–0
- (France) Jo-Wilfried Tsonga 1–0
- (Germany) **Alexander Zverev** 1–0
- (Switzerland) **Roger Federer** 1–1
- (Spain) **Rafael Nadal** 1–1
- (Spain) Roberto Bautista Agut 1–2
- (Russia) **Daniil Medvedev** 1–2
- (Austria) **Dominic Thiem** 1–2
- (Switzerland) Stan Wawrinka 0–1

* Statistics correct as of 22 November 2019.

=== Finals ===
==== Singles: 6 (5 titles, 1 runner-up) ====
Category Grand Slam (2–0) ATP Finals (0–0) Masters 1000 (2-1) 500 Series (1–0) 250 Series (0–0)	Titles by surface Hard (2–0) Clay (1–1) Grass (1–0)	Titles by setting Outdoor (4–1) Indoor (0–0)

Result	W–L	Date	Tournament	Tier	Surface	Opponent	Score
Win	1–0	Jan 2019	Australian Open, Australia (7)	Grand Slam	Hard	(Spain) Rafael Nadal	6–3, 6–2, 6–3
Win	2–0	May 2019	Madrid Open, Spain (3)	Masters 1000	Clay	(Greece) Stefanos Tsitsipas	6–3, 6–4
Loss	2–1	May 2019	Italian Open, Italy	Masters 1000	Clay	(Spain) Rafael Nadal	0–6, 6–4, 1–6
Win	3–1	Jul 2019	Wimbledon, United Kingdom (5)	Grand Slam	Grass	(Switzerland) Roger Federer	7–6^{(7–5)}, 1–6, 7–6^{(7–4)}, 4–6, 13–12^{(7–3)}
Win	4–1	Oct 2019	Japan Open, Japan	500 Series	Hard	(Australia) John Millman	6–3, 6–2
Win	5–1	Nov 2019	Paris Masters, France (5)	Masters 1000	Hard (i)	(Canada) Denis Shapovalov	6–3, 6–4

=== Earnings ===
- **Bold** font denotes tournament win

**Singles**
Event	Prize money	Year-to-date
Qatar Open	$64,975	$64,975
**Australian Open**	**A$4,100,000**	$3,021,895
Indian Wells Masters	$48,775	$3,070,670
Miami Open	$91,205	$3,161,875
Monte-Carlo Masters	€128,200	$3,305,612
**Madrid Open**	**€1,202,520**	$4,651,833
Italian Open	€484,950	$5,196,481
French Open	€590,000	$5,857,399
**Wimbledon Championships**	**£2,350,000**	$8,839,549
Cincinnati Masters	$289,290	$9,128,839
US Open	$280,000	$9,408,839
**Japan Open**	**$391,430**	$9,800,269
Shanghai Masters	$184,000	$9,984,269
**Paris Masters**	**€995,720**	$11,087,228
ATP Finals	$430,000	$11,517,228
Bonus pool	$1,760,000	$13,277,228
		$13,277,228
**Doubles**
Event	Prize money	Year-to-date
Qatar Open	$10,315	$10,315
Indian Wells Masters	$55,930	$66,245
Monte-Carlo Masters	€5,010	$71,862
Cincinnati Masters	$5,830	$77,692
Japan Open	$4,000	$81,692
Shanghai Masters	$13,435	95,127
		$95,127
**Total**
		**$13,372,355**

Figures in United States dollars (USD) unless noted.

- source：2019 Singles Activity
- source：2019 Doubles Activity

=== Awards and nominations ===
- Laureus World Sports Award for Sportsman of the Year

== See also ==
- 2019 ATP Tour
- 2019 Roger Federer tennis season
- 2019 Rafael Nadal tennis season
