= 2019 Rafael Nadal tennis season =

Statistics for Spanish tennis player

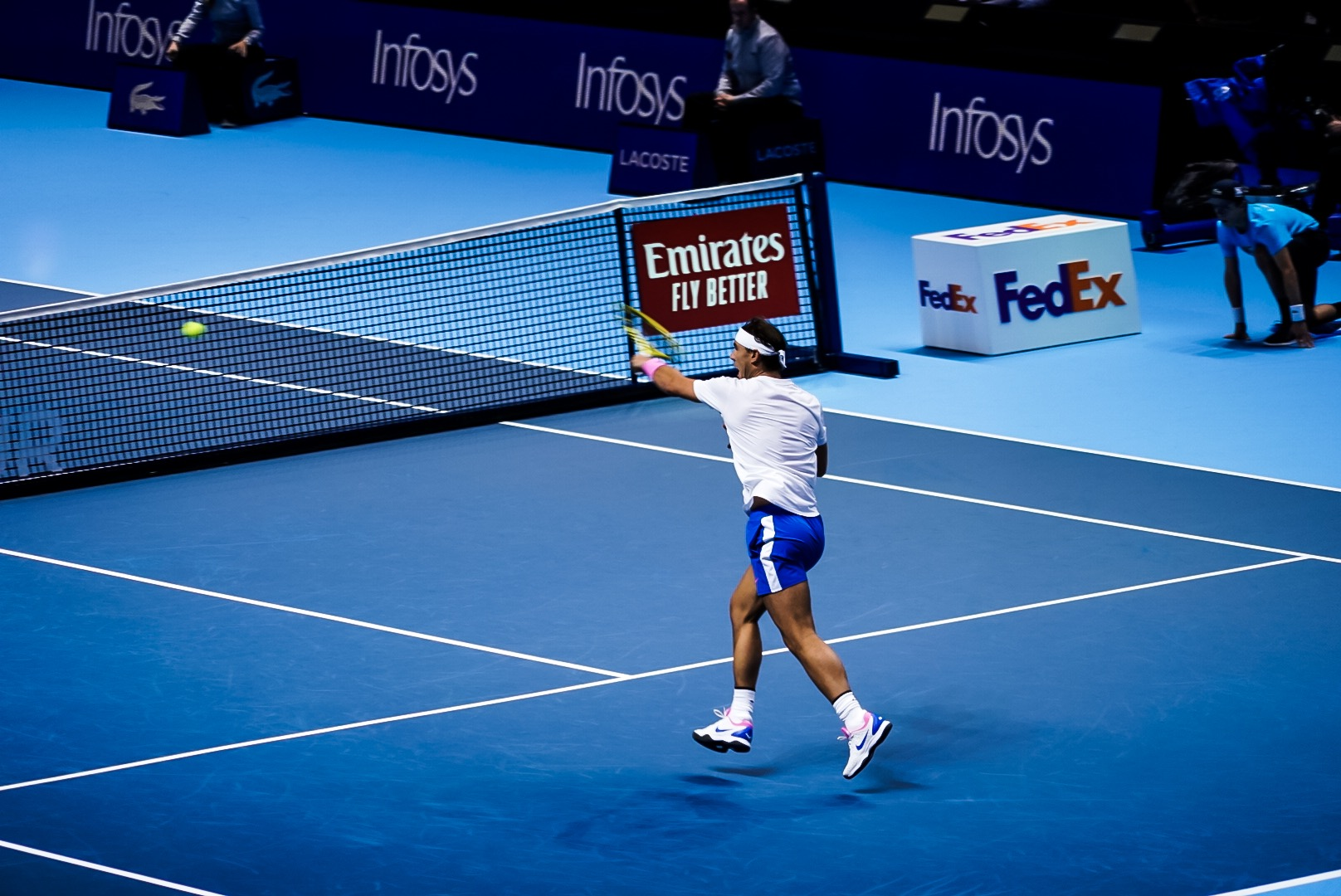
- Full name: Rafael Nadal Parera
- Country: Spain
- Calendar prize money: $16,349,586

Singles
- Season record: 58–7
- Calendar titles: 4
- Current ranking: No. 1
- Ranking change from previous year: ▲1

Grand Slam & significant results
- Australian Open: F
- French Open: W
- Wimbledon: SF
- US Open: W

Doubles
- Season record: 3–1
- Current ranking: Unranked

Mixed doubles
- Season record: 0–0

Injuries
- Injuries: Thigh injury (early January); Knee injury (following Indian Wells); Hand injury (during Laver Cup); Abdominal injury (during Paris)

The 2019 Rafael Nadal tennis season officially began on 14 January 2019, with the start of the Australian Open, and ended 24 November 2019 after Spain's victory at the conclusion of the Davis Cup Finals.

== Year summary ==
=== Early hard court season ===
==== Brisbane International ====
Nadal was scheduled to play his first match of 2019 against Jo-Wilfried Tsonga at the 2019 Brisbane International, however he withdrew before the start of the tournament.

==== Australian Open ====
After retiring in the 2018 Australian Open QF to Marin Čilić, Nadal returned to the tournament as the 2nd seed. Although he was broken once during his first match against Australian James Duckworth, he had a strong showing, beating him in straight sets. He continued with his good form and had strong performances against his second and third round opponents, Aussies Matthew Ebden and Alex de Minaur. In the fourth round, Nadal faced former World No.4 Tomáš Berdych, who although was injured for the latter half of the 2018 season had a strong start to 2019. Nadal, however, comfortably defeated Berdych in straight sets as well. In the QF, Nadal faced American Frances Tiafoe, who was making his first QF appearance in a Grand Slam event. Nadal was able to comfortably hold his service games, as well as break Tiafoe multiple times in a straight set victory. In the SF, Nadal faced Greek Stefanos Tsitsipas, who made his first Grand Slam SF appearance. Nadal was victorious in straight sets, and made his way to his first Australian Open final since 2017. He entered the final having not lost his serve since his opener against Duckworth. However, Nadal lost in straight sets to Novak Djokovic, and was broken five times. It was his first ever straight set loss in a grand slam final.

==== Mexican Open ====
Nadal participated in the Mexican Open for the first time since 2017, after withdrawing in 2018. He defeated Mischa Zverev of Germany in the first round in straight sets, but lost in three sets in the 2nd round to Nick Kyrgios despite having three match points.

==== Indian Wells Masters ====
In 2019 Nadal participated in the Indian Wells Masters for the first time since 2017. He had a bye in the first round, and then defeated Jared Donaldson and 25th seed Diego Schwartzman in straight sets to set up his 4th round match with Filip Krajinović. He also defeated Krajinović in straight sets, and made it to the quarter-finals for the first time since 2016. There he defeated 12th seed Karen Khachanov to book his first meeting since 2017 with Roger Federer, whom he lost to in this tournament in the 4th round in 2017. Unfortunately, due to a knee injury sustained during his QF match, Nadal was forced to withdraw from his match against Federer, ending his run at Indian Wells.

=== Spring clay court season ===
==== Monte-Carlo Masters ====
Nadal returned to competition at the Monte Carlo Masters, where he was the three-time defending champion. He scored dominant wins over Roberto Bautista Agut and Grigor Dimitrov to reach the quarterfinals, where he faced Guido Pella. Nadal defeated Pella in two sets to set up a semifinal encounter against Fabio Fognini. Fognini defeated Nadal in straight sets, ending his 18-match winning streak at the tournament.

==== Barcelona Open ====
Nadal's next event was at the Barcelona Open, where he was the three-time defending champion. After a bye in the first round, Nadal had a tough second round match against Leonardo Mayer, but ultimately prevailed in three sets. Nadal defeated Ferrer and Jan-Lennard Struff in straight sets to make it to the semifinals, where he was ousted by Dominic Thiem in two sets. The loss meant that the 2019 season was the first since 2004 in which Nadal failed to win a title in first four months of the year.

==== Madrid Open ====
Still seeking his first title of 2019, Nadal's next event was at Madrid. In the first round, he defeated Félix Auger-Aliassime of Canada in straight sets. Nadal then advanced to the quarterfinals, by defeating Frances Tiafoe. He beat Stan Wawrinka in the quarterfinal comfortably. But he lost to Stefanos Tsitsipas in the semifinal in three sets. After the loss Nadal claimed that he was not worried about his form.

==== Italian Open ====
As the defending champion, Nadal came into Rome still seeking his first clay court title of the year. After a bye in the first round, in the second and third rounds, he defeated Jérémy Chardy and Nikoloz Basilashvili in straight sets. He faced Fernando Verdasco in the quarterfinals, a match which he comfortably won. Nadal earned his first top ten victory of 2019 by defeating Stefanos Tsitsipas in the semifinals, in a rematch of the Madrid Open semifinal between them just one week before. In the final, he faced Novak Djokovic in their first meeting since the Australian Open. Nadal won the match in three sets, clinching his first title of 2019 and his 9th title in Rome.

==== French Open ====
In an attempt to win a record 12th title at Roland Garros, and defend his championship from last year, Nadal's next tournament is the French Open. His first two matches were against qualifiers Yannick Hanfmann and Yannick Maden, both of whom he defeated in straight sets. In the 3rd round, he defeated David Goffin in 4 sets, and in the 4th round Juan Ignacio Londero in straight sets. In the QF, he defeated Kei Nishikori in straight sets to set up a meeting with 3rd seed and long time rival Roger Federer. The pair have met at the French Open 5 times, with Nadal winning all 5 matches. This was their 6th meeting at RG, and the first since 2011. Nadal took the victory in straight sets, and reached his 3rd consecutive final at Roland Garros. In the final, a rematch of last year's final with Dominic Thiem, Nadal was able to win his 18th GS title, and his 12th at Roland Garros with a victory in 4 sets.

=== Grass court season ===
==== Wimbledon ====
Nadal returned to Wimbledon in an attempt to win his 3rd Wimbledon title, after a SF appearance in 2018. In the first round, he defeated Yūichi Sugita in straight sets, to set up a well anticipated 2nd round encounter with Nick Kyrgios. Kyrgios, as a teenager in 2014 had defeated Nadal at Wimbledon in the 4R, and this will be their first encounter since on the grass court. Nadal defeated Kyrgios in 4 sets, setting up a meeting with former World No. 5 Jo-Wilfried Tsonga. Nadal defeated Tsonga, João Sousa, and Sam Querrey in straight sets to set up a SF encounter with Roger Federer. This was their first meeting at the All England Club since the 2008 final. This time, Federer prevailed in 4 close sets and proceeded to his 12th Wimbledon final.

=== North American hard court season ===
==== Canadian Open ====
Nadal's first tournament in the North American hard court season was the Canadian Open in Montréal, where he opted to defend his title from 2018, and win a 5th overall title at the tournament. After receiving a bye in the first round, he defeated Dan Evans and Guido Pella in the second and third rounds to reach the QF. His QF matchup was against Fabio Fognini. Fognini took the first set, but Nadal took the next two easily to win the match in three sets to make his 7th SF in Canada. In the SF, he was due face Gaël Monfils, but unfortunately Monfils had to withdraw out of the match due an injury, allowing Nadal to advance to a second consecutive Rogers Cup final, where he faced Daniil Medvedev. He was able to defeat Medvedev in two quick sets to claim his 5th title in Canada. Nadal also defended a title off clay for the first time in his career, and also won a record 35th Masters 1000 title.

==== US Open ====
Having not played Cincinnati after his victory in Canada, Nadal's next tournament was the 2019 US Open, where he was seeded 2nd. Nadal's first match was against John Millman, which he won in straight sets. He was due to play Thanasi Kokkinakis in the 2nd round, but due to injury, Kokkinakis retired before the start of the match. Nadal went on to play Chung Hyeon in the 3rd round, who he defeated in straight sets, and Marin Čilić in the 4th round, whom he defeated in 4 sets. In the QF, he defeated Diego Schwartzman in straight sets, to set up a SF meeting with first time major semifinalist Matteo Berrettini. Nadal beat Berrettini 7–6^{(8–6)}, 6–4, 6–1 to reach his 5th US Open final, where he had a rematch of the Montréal final with Daniil Medvedev. Nadal won in 5 sets after having a 2 set lead; and with this victory, won his 4th US Open and 19th Grand Slam title.

=== European indoor hard court season ===
==== Paris Masters ====
Having not played since the US Open as he missed the Asian swing due to his wedding, Nadal will next play the Paris Masters. He defeated Adrian Mannarino, Stan Wawrinka, and Jo-Wilfried Tsonga in straight sets to reach the semi-finals. However, due to an abdominal injury, Nadal was forced to withdraw from his match against Denis Shapovalov.

After the conclusion of the Paris Masters, Nadal regained the World No. 1 position for the first time in 2019.

==== ATP Finals ====
Nadal played the ATP Finals, although he suffered an abdominal injury during the Paris Masters. He was placed in Group Andre Agassi for the Round robin stage, along with Alexander Zverev, Daniil Medvedev and Stefanos Tsitsipas.

Nadal lost his first round robin match against Zverev in straight sets, the Spaniard not being able to respond to the serving performance of the German. In the next match against Medvedev, Nadal lost the first set in a tiebreak but was able to win the second set to bring the match to a deciding set. After going down 5–1 in the third set with defeat imminent, Nadal went on to break Medvedev twice to bring the match to a tiebreak, where he was able to win his first match at the ATP Finals since 2015.

After the defeat of Novak Djokovic by Roger Federer in the round-robin, Nadal claimed his 5th year-end no.1 and became the first man to be No.1 in 3 different decades. Concurrently, he became the oldest year-end no.1 and set the record for the longest gap between first and last year-end no.1's.

Nadal defeated Tsitsipas in 3 sets in his final round-robin match, but unfortunately, due to Medvedev's loss against Zverev, he will not proceed to the semi-finals.

==== Davis Cup Finals ====
Nadal's final tournament of the year was the Davis Cup, which was held in its new format in Madrid. In his first match for Spain, he played in the round robin against Russia, where he defeated Karen Khachanov in straight sets.

In his next match, he played Croatian Borna Gojo, whom he also defeated in straight sets. Nadal also played in the doubles match against Croatia, partnered with compatriot Marcel Granollers. The pair won the doubles match in straight sets against Ivan Dodig and Mate Pavić.

In the quarterfinal, Spain played Argentina, and Nadal's next match was against Argentine Diego Schwartzman, whom he defeated in straight sets. In the doubles, he won in 3 sets against Leonardo Mayer and Máximo González alongside Granollers. This resulted in Spain moving forward onto the semifinals against Great Britain. In singles, Nadal defeated Dan Evans in straight sets. In doubles, Nadal partnered with Feliciano López and won against Jamie Murray and Neal Skupski in straight sets, leading Spain to the Davis Cup final for the first time since 2012.

In the final, Spain's first match was played by Roberto Bautista Agut, against Félix Auger-Aliassime. Bautista Agut was able to defeat Alissame in straight sets, to set up an encounter between Denis Shapovalov and Nadal. Nadal won the match 6–3, 7–6^{(8–6)} to lead Spain to a 6th Davis Cup victory. Nadal withstood both single and double matches, spending over 14 hours on court in 6 days. He was awarded the Davis Cup Most Valuable Player (MVP) trophy, after he won 8 of the 8 matches he participated in.

== All matches ==
This table chronicles all the matches of Rafael Nadal in 2019.

Key
W	F	SF	QF	#R	RR	Q#	P#	DNQ	A	Z#	PO	G	S	B	NMS	NTI	P	NH

(W) winner; (F) finalist; (SF) semifinalist; (QF) quarterfinalist; (#R) rounds 4, 3, 2, 1; (RR) round-robin stage; (Q#) qualification round; (P#) preliminary round; (DNQ) did not qualify; (A) absent; (Z#) Davis/Fed Cup Zonal Group (with number indication) or (PO) play-off; (G) gold, (S) silver or (B) bronze Olympic/Paralympic medal; (NMS) not a Masters tournament; (NTI) not a Tier I tournament; (P) postponed; (NH) not held; (SR) strike rate (events won / competed); (W–L) win–loss record.
To avoid confusion and double counting, these charts are updated at the conclusion of a tournament or when the player's participation has ended.

=== Singles matches ===
Tournament	Match	Round	Opponent (seed or key)	Rank	Result	Score
Brisbane International; Brisbane, Australia; ATP 250; Hard, outdoor 31 December 2018 – 6 January 2019
Brisbane International; Brisbane, Australia; ATP 250; Hard, outdoor 31 December 2018 – 6 January 2019	Withdrew					
Australian Open; Melbourne, Australia; Grand Slam tournament Hard, outdoor 14–27 January 2019
Australian Open; Melbourne, Australia; Grand Slam tournament Hard, outdoor 14–27 January 2019	1 / 1110	1R	(Australia) James Duckworth (WC)	237	Win	6–4, 6–3, 7–5
Australian Open; Melbourne, Australia; Grand Slam tournament Hard, outdoor 14–27 January 2019	2 / 1111	2R	(Australia) Matthew Ebden	48	Win	6–3, 6–2, 6–2
Australian Open; Melbourne, Australia; Grand Slam tournament Hard, outdoor 14–27 January 2019	3 / 1112	3R	(Australia) Alex de Minaur (27)	29	Win	6–1, 6–2, 6–4
Australian Open; Melbourne, Australia; Grand Slam tournament Hard, outdoor 14–27 January 2019	4 / 1113	4R	(Czech Republic) Tomáš Berdych	57	Win	6–0, 6–1, 7–6^{(7–4)}
Australian Open; Melbourne, Australia; Grand Slam tournament Hard, outdoor 14–27 January 2019	5 / 1114	QF	(United States) Frances Tiafoe	39	Win	6–3, 6–4, 6–2
Australian Open; Melbourne, Australia; Grand Slam tournament Hard, outdoor 14–27 January 2019	6 / 1115	SF	(Greece) Stefanos Tsitsipas (14)	15	Win	6–2, 6–4, 6–0
Australian Open; Melbourne, Australia; Grand Slam tournament Hard, outdoor 14–27 January 2019	7 / 1116	F	(Serbia) Novak Djokovic (1)	1	Loss	3–6, 2–6, 3–6
Mexican Open; Acapulco, Mexico; ATP 500; Hard, outdoor 25 February – 2 March 2019
Mexican Open; Acapulco, Mexico; ATP 500; Hard, outdoor 25 February – 2 March 2019	8 / 1117	1R	(Germany) Mischa Zverev	76	Win	6–3, 6–3
Mexican Open; Acapulco, Mexico; ATP 500; Hard, outdoor 25 February – 2 March 2019	9 / 1118	2R	(Australia) Nick Kyrgios	72	Loss	6–3, 6–7^{(2–7)}, 6–7^{(6–8)}
Indian Wells Masters; Indian Wells, United States; ATP 1000; Hard, outdoor 4–17 March 2019
Indian Wells Masters; Indian Wells, United States; ATP 1000; Hard, outdoor 4–17 March 2019	–	1R	Bye			
Indian Wells Masters; Indian Wells, United States; ATP 1000; Hard, outdoor 4–17 March 2019	10 / 1119	2R	(United States) Jared Donaldson (WC)	176	Win	6–1, 6–1
Indian Wells Masters; Indian Wells, United States; ATP 1000; Hard, outdoor 4–17 March 2019	11 / 1120	3R	(Argentina) Diego Schwartzman (25)	26	Win	6–3, 6–1
Indian Wells Masters; Indian Wells, United States; ATP 1000; Hard, outdoor 4–17 March 2019	12 / 1121	4R	(Serbia) Filip Krajinović (Q)	113	Win	6–3, 6–4
Indian Wells Masters; Indian Wells, United States; ATP 1000; Hard, outdoor 4–17 March 2019	13 / 1122	QF	(Russia) Karen Khachanov (12)	13	Win	7–6^{(7–2)}, 7–6^{(7–2)}
Indian Wells Masters; Indian Wells, United States; ATP 1000; Hard, outdoor 4–17 March 2019	–	SF	(Switzerland) Roger Federer (4)	4	Withdrew	N/A
Monte-Carlo Masters; Monte Carlo, Monaco; ATP 1000; Clay, outdoor 14–21 April 2019
Monte-Carlo Masters; Monte Carlo, Monaco; ATP 1000; Clay, outdoor 14–21 April 2019	–	1R	Bye			
Monte-Carlo Masters; Monte Carlo, Monaco; ATP 1000; Clay, outdoor 14–21 April 2019	14 / 1123	2R	(Spain) Roberto Bautista Agut	22	Win	6–1, 6–1
Monte-Carlo Masters; Monte Carlo, Monaco; ATP 1000; Clay, outdoor 14–21 April 2019	15 / 1124	3R	(Bulgaria) Grigor Dimitrov	28	Win	6–4, 6–1
Monte-Carlo Masters; Monte Carlo, Monaco; ATP 1000; Clay, outdoor 14–21 April 2019	16 / 1125	QF	(Argentina) Guido Pella	35	Win	7–6^{(7–1)}, 6–3
Monte-Carlo Masters; Monte Carlo, Monaco; ATP 1000; Clay, outdoor 14–21 April 2019	17 / 1126	SF	(Italy) Fabio Fognini (13)	18	Loss	4–6, 2–6
Barcelona Open; Barcelona, Spain; ATP 500; Clay, outdoor 22–28 April 2019
Barcelona Open; Barcelona, Spain; ATP 500; Clay, outdoor 22–28 April 2019	–	1R	Bye			
Barcelona Open; Barcelona, Spain; ATP 500; Clay, outdoor 22–28 April 2019	18 / 1127	2R	(Argentina) Leonardo Mayer	63	Win	6–7^{(7–9)}, 6–4, 6–2
Barcelona Open; Barcelona, Spain; ATP 500; Clay, outdoor 22–28 April 2019	19 / 1128	3R	(Spain) David Ferrer (WC)	155	Win	6–3, 6–3
Barcelona Open; Barcelona, Spain; ATP 500; Clay, outdoor 22–28 April 2019	20 / 1129	QF	(Germany) Jan-Lennard Struff	51	Win	7–5, 7–5
Barcelona Open; Barcelona, Spain; ATP 500; Clay, outdoor 22–28 April 2019	21 / 1130	SF	(Austria) Dominic Thiem (3)	5	Loss	4–6, 4–6
Madrid Open; Madrid, Spain; ATP 1000; Clay, outdoor 5–12 May 2019
Madrid Open; Madrid, Spain; ATP 1000; Clay, outdoor 5–12 May 2019	–	1R	Bye			
Madrid Open; Madrid, Spain; ATP 1000; Clay, outdoor 5–12 May 2019	22 / 1131	2R	(Canada) Félix Auger-Aliassime (WC)	30	Win	6–3, 6–3
Madrid Open; Madrid, Spain; ATP 1000; Clay, outdoor 5–12 May 2019	23 / 1132	3R	(United States) Frances Tiafoe	37	Win	6–3, 6–4
Madrid Open; Madrid, Spain; ATP 1000; Clay, outdoor 5–12 May 2019	24 / 1133	QF	(Switzerland) Stan Wawrinka	34	Win	6–1, 6–2
Madrid Open; Madrid, Spain; ATP 1000; Clay, outdoor 5–12 May 2019	25 / 1134	SF	(Greece) Stefanos Tsitsipas	9	Loss	4–6, 6–2, 3–6
Italian Open; Rome, Italy; ATP 1000; Clay, outdoor 12–19 May 2019
Italian Open; Rome, Italy; ATP 1000; Clay, outdoor 12–19 May 2019	–	1R	Bye			
Italian Open; Rome, Italy; ATP 1000; Clay, outdoor 12–19 May 2019	26 / 1135	2R	(France) Jérémy Chardy	42	Win	6–0, 6–1
Italian Open; Rome, Italy; ATP 1000; Clay, outdoor 12–19 May 2019	27 / 1136	3R	(Georgia (country)) Nikoloz Basilashvili	18	Win	6–1, 6–0
Italian Open; Rome, Italy; ATP 1000; Clay, outdoor 12–19 May 2019	28 / 1137	QF	(Spain) Fernando Verdasco	38	Win	6–4, 6–0
Italian Open; Rome, Italy; ATP 1000; Clay, outdoor 12–19 May 2019	29 / 1138	SF	(Greece) Stefanos Tsitsipas (8)	7	Win	6–3, 6–4
Italian Open; Rome, Italy; ATP 1000; Clay, outdoor 12–19 May 2019	30 / 1139	W	(Serbia) Novak Djokovic (1)	1	Win (1)	6–0, 4–6, 6–1
French Open; Paris, France; Grand Slam tournament Clay, outdoor 27 May – 9 June 2019
French Open; Paris, France; Grand Slam tournament Clay, outdoor 27 May – 9 June 2019	31 / 1140	1R	(Germany) Yannick Hanfmann (Q)	180	Win	6–2, 6–1, 6–3
French Open; Paris, France; Grand Slam tournament Clay, outdoor 27 May – 9 June 2019	32 / 1141	2R	(Germany) Yannick Maden (Q)	114	Win	6–1, 6–2, 6–4
French Open; Paris, France; Grand Slam tournament Clay, outdoor 27 May – 9 June 2019	33 / 1142	3R	(Belgium) David Goffin (27)	29	Win	6–1, 6–3, 4–6, 6–3
French Open; Paris, France; Grand Slam tournament Clay, outdoor 27 May – 9 June 2019	34 / 1143	4R	(Argentina) Juan Ignacio Londero	78	Win	6–2, 6–3, 6–3
French Open; Paris, France; Grand Slam tournament Clay, outdoor 27 May – 9 June 2019	35 / 1144	QF	(Japan) Kei Nishikori (7)	7	Win	6–1, 6–1, 6–3
French Open; Paris, France; Grand Slam tournament Clay, outdoor 27 May – 9 June 2019	36 / 1145	SF	(Switzerland) Roger Federer (3)	3	Win	6–3, 6–4, 6–2
French Open; Paris, France; Grand Slam tournament Clay, outdoor 27 May – 9 June 2019	37 / 1146	W	(Austria) Dominic Thiem (4)	4	Win (2)	6–3, 5–7, 6–1, 6–1
Wimbledon Championships; London, United Kingdom; Grand Slam tournament Grass, outdoor 1–14 July 2019
Wimbledon Championships; London, United Kingdom; Grand Slam tournament Grass, outdoor 1–14 July 2019	38 / 1147	1R	(Japan) Yūichi Sugita (Q)	258	Win	6–3, 6–1, 6–3
Wimbledon Championships; London, United Kingdom; Grand Slam tournament Grass, outdoor 1–14 July 2019	39 / 1148	2R	(Australia) Nick Kyrgios	43	Win	6–3, 3–6, 7–6^{(7–5)}, 7–6^{(7–3)}
Wimbledon Championships; London, United Kingdom; Grand Slam tournament Grass, outdoor 1–14 July 2019	40 / 1149	3R	(France) Jo-Wilfried Tsonga	72	Win	6–2, 6–3, 6–2
Wimbledon Championships; London, United Kingdom; Grand Slam tournament Grass, outdoor 1–14 July 2019	41 / 1150	4R	(Portugal) João Sousa	69	Win	6–2, 6–2, 6–2
Wimbledon Championships; London, United Kingdom; Grand Slam tournament Grass, outdoor 1–14 July 2019	42 / 1151	QF	(United States) Sam Querrey	65	Win	7–5, 6–2, 6–2
Wimbledon Championships; London, United Kingdom; Grand Slam tournament Grass, outdoor 1–14 July 2019	43 / 1152	SF	(Switzerland) Roger Federer (2)	3	Loss	6–7^{(3–7)}, 6–1, 3–6, 4–6
Canadian Open; Montréal, Canada; ATP 1000; Hard, outdoor 5–11 August 2019
Canadian Open; Montréal, Canada; ATP 1000; Hard, outdoor 5–11 August 2019	–	1R	Bye			
Canadian Open; Montréal, Canada; ATP 1000; Hard, outdoor 5–11 August 2019	44 / 1153	2R	(United Kingdom) Dan Evans (Q)	53	Win	7–6^{(8–6)}, 6–4
Canadian Open; Montréal, Canada; ATP 1000; Hard, outdoor 5–11 August 2019	45 / 1154	3R	(Argentina) Guido Pella	24	Win	6–3, 6–4
Canadian Open; Montréal, Canada; ATP 1000; Hard, outdoor 5–11 August 2019	46 / 1155	QF	(Italy) Fabio Fognini (7)	11	Win	2–6, 6–1, 6–2
Canadian Open; Montréal, Canada; ATP 1000; Hard, outdoor 5–11 August 2019	–	SF	(France) Gaël Monfils (16)	20	Walkover	N/A
Canadian Open; Montréal, Canada; ATP 1000; Hard, outdoor 5–11 August 2019	47 / 1156	W	(Russia) Daniil Medvedev (8)	9	Win (3)	6–3, 6–0
Cincinnati Masters; Cincinnati, United States; ATP 1000; Hard, outdoor 12–18 August 2019
Cincinnati Masters; Cincinnati, United States; ATP 1000; Hard, outdoor 12–18 August 2019	Withdrew					
US Open; New York City, United States; Grand Slam tournament Hard, outdoor 26 August – 8 September 2019
US Open; New York City, United States; Grand Slam tournament Hard, outdoor 26 August – 8 September 2019	48 / 1157	1R	(Australia) John Millman	61	Win	6–3, 6–2, 6–2
US Open; New York City, United States; Grand Slam tournament Hard, outdoor 26 August – 8 September 2019	–	2R	(Australia) Thanasi Kokkinakis (WC)	203	Walkover	N/A
US Open; New York City, United States; Grand Slam tournament Hard, outdoor 26 August – 8 September 2019	49 / 1158	3R	(South Korea) Chung Hyeon (Q)	170	Win	6–3, 6–4, 6–2
US Open; New York City, United States; Grand Slam tournament Hard, outdoor 26 August – 8 September 2019	50 / 1159	4R	(Croatia) Marin Čilić (22)	23	Win	6–3, 3–6, 6–1, 6–2
US Open; New York City, United States; Grand Slam tournament Hard, outdoor 26 August – 8 September 2019	51 / 1160	QF	(Argentina) Diego Schwartzman (20)	21	Win	6–4, 7–5, 6–2
US Open; New York City, United States; Grand Slam tournament Hard, outdoor 26 August – 8 September 2019	52 / 1161	SF	(Italy) Matteo Berrettini (24)	25	Win	7–6^{(8–6)}, 6–4, 6–1
US Open; New York City, United States; Grand Slam tournament Hard, outdoor 26 August – 8 September 2019	53 / 1162	W	(Russia) Daniil Medvedev (5)	5	Win (4)	7–5, 6–3, 5–7, 4–6, 6–4
Laver Cup; Geneva, Switzerland; Laver Cup; Hard, indoor 20–22 September 2019
Laver Cup; Geneva, Switzerland; Laver Cup; Hard, indoor 20–22 September 2019	54 / 1163	Day 2	(Canada) Milos Raonic	24	Win	6–3, 7–6^{(7–1)}
Paris Masters; Paris, France; ATP 1000; Hard, indoor 28 October – 3 November 2019
Paris Masters; Paris, France; ATP 1000; Hard, indoor 28 October – 3 November 2019	–	1R	Bye			
Paris Masters; Paris, France; ATP 1000; Hard, indoor 28 October – 3 November 2019	55 / 1164	2R	(France) Adrian Mannarino (WC)	43	Win	7–5, 6–4
Paris Masters; Paris, France; ATP 1000; Hard, indoor 28 October – 3 November 2019	56 / 1165	3R	(Switzerland) Stan Wawrinka (16)	16	Win	6–4, 6–4
Paris Masters; Paris, France; ATP 1000; Hard, indoor 28 October – 3 November 2019	57 / 1166	QF	(France) Jo-Wilfried Tsonga (WC)	35	Win	7–6^{(7–4)}, 6–1
Paris Masters; Paris, France; ATP 1000; Hard, indoor 28 October – 3 November 2019	–	SF	(Canada) Denis Shapovalov	28	Withdrew	N/A
ATP Finals; London, United Kingdom; ATP Finals; Hard, indoor 10–17 November 2019
ATP Finals; London, United Kingdom; ATP Finals; Hard, indoor 10–17 November 2019	58 / 1167	RR	(Germany) Alexander Zverev (7)	7	Loss	2–6, 4–6
ATP Finals; London, United Kingdom; ATP Finals; Hard, indoor 10–17 November 2019	59 / 1168	RR	(Russia) Daniil Medvedev (4)	4	Win	6–7^{(3–7)}, 6–3, 7–6^{(7–4)}
ATP Finals; London, United Kingdom; ATP Finals; Hard, indoor 10–17 November 2019	60 / 1169	RR	(Greece) Stefanos Tsitsipas (6)	6	Win	6–7^{(4–7)}, 6–4, 7–5
Davis Cup Finals; Madrid, Spain; Davis Cup; Hard, indoor 18–24 November 2019
Davis Cup Finals; Madrid, Spain; Davis Cup; Hard, indoor 18–24 November 2019	61 / 1170	RR	(Russia) Karen Khachanov	17	Win	6–3, 7–6^{(9–7)}
Davis Cup Finals; Madrid, Spain; Davis Cup; Hard, indoor 18–24 November 2019	62 / 1171	RR	(Croatia) Borna Gojo	280	Win	6–4, 6–3
Davis Cup Finals; Madrid, Spain; Davis Cup; Hard, indoor 18–24 November 2019	63 / 1172	QF	(Argentina) Diego Schwartzman	14	Win	6–1, 6–2
Davis Cup Finals; Madrid, Spain; Davis Cup; Hard, indoor 18–24 November 2019	64 / 1173	SF	(United Kingdom) Dan Evans	42	Win	6–4, 6–0
Davis Cup Finals; Madrid, Spain; Davis Cup; Hard, indoor 18–24 November 2019	65 / 1174	W	(Canada) Denis Shapovalov	15	Win	6–3, 7–6^{(9–7)}

=== Doubles matches ===
Tournament	Match	Round	Opponents (seed or key)	Ranks	Result	Score
Laver Cup; Geneva, Switzerland; Laver Cup; Hard, indoor 20–22 September 2019; Partner: (Greece) Stefanos Tsitsipas
Laver Cup; Geneva, Switzerland; Laver Cup; Hard, indoor 20–22 September 2019; Partner: (Greece) Stefanos Tsitsipas	1 / 206	Day 2	(Australia) Nick Kyrgios / (United States) Jack Sock	181 / 37	Loss	4–6, 6–3, 6–10
Davis Cup Finals; Madrid, Spain; Davis Cup; Hard, indoor 18–24 November 2019; Partner: (Spain) Marcel Granollers (RR / QF) (Spain) Feliciano López (SF)
Davis Cup Finals; Madrid, Spain; Davis Cup; Hard, indoor 18–24 November 2019; Partner: (Spain) Marcel Granollers (RR / QF) (Spain) Feliciano López (SF)	2 / 207	RR	(Croatia) Ivan Dodig / (Croatia) Mate Pavić	12 / 18	Win	6–3, 6–4
Davis Cup Finals; Madrid, Spain; Davis Cup; Hard, indoor 18–24 November 2019; Partner: (Spain) Marcel Granollers (RR / QF) (Spain) Feliciano López (SF)	3 / 208	QF	(Argentina) Máximo González / (Argentina) Leonardo Mayer	34 / 61	Win	6–4, 4–6, 6–3
Davis Cup Finals; Madrid, Spain; Davis Cup; Hard, indoor 18–24 November 2019; Partner: (Spain) Marcel Granollers (RR / QF) (Spain) Feliciano López (SF)	4 / 209	SF	(United Kingdom) Jamie Murray / (United Kingdom) Neal Skupski	23 / 31	Win	7–6^{(7–3)}, 7–6^{(10–8)}

== Exhibition matches ==
=== Singles ===
Tournament	Match	Round	Opponent (seed or key)	Rank	Result	Score
World Tennis Championship; Abu Dhabi, United Arab Emirates; Exhibition; Hard, outdoor 27–29 December 2018
World Tennis Championship; Abu Dhabi, United Arab Emirates; Exhibition; Hard, outdoor 27–29 December 2018	–	QF	Bye			
World Tennis Championship; Abu Dhabi, United Arab Emirates; Exhibition; Hard, outdoor 27–29 December 2018	1	SF	(South Africa) Kevin Anderson (3)	6	Loss	6–4, 3–6, 4–6
World Tennis Championship; Abu Dhabi, United Arab Emirates; Exhibition; Hard, outdoor 27–29 December 2018	–	SF-B	(Russia) Karen Khachanov (5)	11	Withdrew	N/A
Fast4 Showdown; Sydney, Australia; Exhibition; Hard, outdoor 7 January 2019
Fast4 Showdown; Sydney, Australia; Exhibition; Hard, outdoor 7 January 2019	2	–	(Australia) Nick Kyrgios	51	Loss	0–4, 4–3^{(5–3)}, [3–5]
Tie Break Tens; Indian Wells, United States; Exhibition; Hard, outdoor 5 March 2019
Tie Break Tens; Indian Wells, United States; Exhibition; Hard, outdoor 5 March 2019	3	QF	(United States) Taylor Fritz	46	Win	[10–8]
Tie Break Tens; Indian Wells, United States; Exhibition; Hard, outdoor 5 March 2019	4	SF	(Switzerland) Stan Wawrinka	40	Loss	[11–13]
Hurlingham Tennis Classic; London, United Kingdom; Exhibition; Grass, outdoor 25–28 June 2019
Hurlingham Tennis Classic; London, United Kingdom; Exhibition; Grass, outdoor 25–28 June 2019	5	–	(Croatia) Marin Čilić	18	Loss	3–6, 3–6
Hurlingham Tennis Classic; London, United Kingdom; Exhibition; Grass, outdoor 25–28 June 2019	6	–	(France) Lucas Pouille	28	Loss	3–6, 6–4, [5–10]
Kazakhstan Charity Exhibition Match; Nur-Sultan, Kazakhstan; Exhibition; Hard, indoor 24 October 2019
Kazakhstan Charity Exhibition Match; Nur-Sultan, Kazakhstan; Exhibition; Hard, indoor 24 October 2019	7	–	(Serbia) Novak Djokovic	1	Win	6–3, 3–6, [11–9]

=== Doubles ===
Tournament	Match	Round	Opponents (seed or key)	Ranks	Result	Score
Fast4 Showdown; Sydney, Australia; Exhibition; Hard, outdoor 7 January 2019; Partner: (Canada) Milos Raonic
Fast4 Showdown; Sydney, Australia; Exhibition; Hard, outdoor 7 January 2019; Partner: (Canada) Milos Raonic	2	–	(Australia) Nick Kyrgios / (Australia) John Millman	147 / 250	Win	4–1, 1–4, [5–4]

== Schedule ==
Per Rafael Nadal, the below was his 2019 schedule.

=== Singles schedule ===
Date	Tournament	Location	Category	Surface	Prev. result	Prev. points	New points	Result
31 December 2018– 6 January 2019	Brisbane International	Brisbane (AUS)	250 Series	Hard	A	N/A	N/A	Withdrew due to a thigh injury
14 January 2019– 27 January 2019	Australian Open	Melbourne (AUS)	Grand Slam	Hard	QF	360	1200	Final (lost to Novak Djokovic, 3–6, 2–6, 3–6)
25 February 2019– 2 March 2019	Mexican Open	Acapulco (MEX)	500 Series	Hard	A	N/A	45	Second round (lost to Nick Kyrgios, 6–3, 6–7^{(2–7)}, 6–7^{(6–8)})
4 March 2019– 17 March 2019	Indian Wells Masters	Indian Wells (USA)	Masters 1000	Hard	A	N/A	360	Semifinals (withdrew to Roger Federer due to knee injury)
14 April 2019– 21 April 2019	Monte-Carlo Masters	Monte Carlo (MON)	Masters 1000	Clay	W	1000	360	Semifinals (lost to Fabio Fognini, 4–6, 2–6)
22 April 2019– 28 April 2019	Barcelona Open	Barcelona (ESP)	500 Series	Clay	W	500	180	Semifinals (lost to Dominic Thiem, 4–6, 4–6)
5 May 2019– 12 May 2019	Madrid Open	Madrid (ESP)	Masters 1000	Clay	QF	180	360	Semifinals (lost to Stefanos Tsitsipas, 4–6, 6–2, 3–6)
12 May 2019– 19 May 2019	Italian Open	Rome (ITA)	Masters 1000	Clay	W	1000	1000	Champion (defeated Novak Djokovic, 6–0, 4–6, 6–1)
26 May 2019– 9 June 2019	French Open	Paris (FRA)	Grand Slam	Clay	W	2000	2000	Champion (defeated Dominic Thiem, 6–3, 5–7, 6–1, 6–1)
1 July 2019– 14 July 2019	Wimbledon	London (GBR)	Grand Slam	Grass	SF	720	720	Semifinals (lost to Roger Federer, 6–7^{(3–7)}, 6–1, 3–6, 4–6)
5 August 2019– 11 August 2019	Canadian Open	Montreal (CAN)	Masters 1000	Hard	W	1000	1000	Champion (defeated Daniil Medvedev, 6–3, 6–0)
11 August 2019– 18 August 2019	Cincinnati Masters	Cincinnati (USA)	Masters 1000	Hard	A	N/A	N/A	Withdrew due to fatigue
26 August 2019– 8 September 2019	US Open	New York (USA)	Grand Slam	Hard	SF	720	2000	Champion (defeated Daniil Medvedev, 7–5, 6–3, 5–7, 4–6, 6–4)
20 September 2018– 22 September 2018	Laver Cup	Geneva (SUI)	Laver Cup	Hard (i)	A	N/A	–	Europe defeated World, 13–11
6 October 2019– 13 October 2019	Shanghai Masters	Shanghai (CHN)	Masters 1000	Hard	A	N/A	N/A	Withdrew due to a hand injury
28 October 2019– 3 November 2019	Paris Masters	Paris (FRA)	Masters 1000	Hard (i)	A	N/A	360	Semifinals (withdrew to Denis Shapovalov due to abdominal injury)
10 November 2019– 17 November 2019	ATP Finals	London (GBR)	Tour Finals	Hard (i)	A	N/A	400	Round robin (2 wins – 1 loss)
18 November 2019– 24 November 2019	Davis Cup Finals	Madrid (ESP)	Davis Cup	Hard (i)	SF	–	–	Spain defeated Canada, 2–0
Total year-end points						7480	9985	▲2505 difference

=== Doubles schedule ===
Date	Tournament	Location	Category	Surface	Prev. result	Prev. points	New points	Result
20 September 2018– 22 September 2018	Laver Cup	Geneva (SUI)	Laver Cup	Hard (i)	N/A	N/A	N/A	Europe defeated World, 13–11
18 November 2019– 24 November 2019	Davis Cup Finals	Madrid (ESP)	Davis Cup	Hard (i)	SF	N/A	N/A	Spain defeated Canada, 2–0
Total year-end points						0	0	0 difference

== Yearly records ==
=== Head-to-head matchups ===
Rafael Nadal has a 58–7 ATP match win–loss record in the 2019 season. His record against players who were part of the ATP rankings Top Ten at the time of their meetings is 10–5. Bold indicates player was ranked top 10 at time of at least one meeting. The following list is ordered by number of wins:

- (Russia) **Daniil Medvedev** 3–0
- (Argentina) Diego Schwartzman 3–0
- (Greece) **Stefanos Tsitsipas** 3–1
- (United Kingdom) Dan Evans 2–0
- (Russia) Karen Khachanov 2–0
- (Argentina) Guido Pella 2–0
- (United States) Frances Tiafoe 2–0
- (France) Jo-Wilfried Tsonga 2–0
- (Switzerland) Stan Wawrinka 2–0
- (Canada) Félix Auger-Aliassime 1–0
- (Georgia (country)) Nikoloz Basilashvili 1–0
- (Spain) Roberto Bautista Agut 1–0
- (Czech Republic) Tomáš Berdych 1–0
- (Italy) Matteo Berrettini 1–0
- (France) Jérémy Chardy 1–0
- (Croatia) Marin Čilić 1–0
- (Australia) Alex de Minaur 1–0
- (Bulgaria) Grigor Dimitrov 1–0
- (United States) Jared Donaldson 1–0
- (Australia) James Duckworth 1–0
- (Australia) Matthew Ebden 1–0
- (Spain) David Ferrer 1–0
- (Belgium) David Goffin 1–0
- (Croatia) Borna Gojo 1–0
- (Germany) Yannick Hanfmann 1–0
- (South Korea) Chung Hyeon 1–0
- (Serbia) Filip Krajinović 1–0
- (Argentina) Juan Ignacio Londero 1–0
- (Germany) Yannick Maden 1–0
- (France) Adrian Mannarino 1–0
- (Argentina) Leonardo Mayer 1–0
- (Australia) John Millman 1–0
- (Japan) **Kei Nishikori** 1–0
- (United States) Sam Querrey 1–0
- (Canada) Milos Raonic 1–0
- (Canada) Denis Shapovalov 1–0
- (Portugal) João Sousa 1–0
- (Germany) Jan-Lennard Struff 1–0
- (Japan) Yūichi Sugita 1–0
- (Spain) Fernando Verdasco 1–0
- (Germany) Mischa Zverev 1–0
- (Serbia) **Novak Djokovic** 1–1
- (Switzerland) **Roger Federer** 1–1
- (Italy) Fabio Fognini 1–1
- (Australia) Nick Kyrgios 1–1
- (Austria) **Dominic Thiem** 1–1
- (Germany) **Alexander Zverev** 0–1

* Statistics correct as of 24 November 2019.

=== Finals ===
==== Singles: 5 (4 titles, 1 runner-up) ====
Category Grand Slam (2–1) ATP Finals (0–0) ATP Tour Masters 1000 (2–0) ATP Tour 500 (0–0) ATP Tour 250 (0–0)	Titles by surface Hard (2–1) Clay (2–0) Grass (0–0)	Titles by setting Outdoor (4–1) Indoor (0–0)

Result	W–L	Date	Tournament	Tier	Surface	Opponent	Score
Loss	0–1	Jan 2019	Australian Open, Australia	Grand Slam	Hard	(Serbia) Novak Djokovic	3–6, 2–6, 3–6
Win	1–1	May 2019	Italian Open, Italy	Masters 1000	Clay	(Serbia) Novak Djokovic	6–0, 4–6, 6–1
Win	2–1	Jun 2019	French Open, France	Grand Slam	Clay	(Austria) Dominic Thiem	6–3, 5–7, 6–1, 6–1
Win	3–1	Aug 2019	Canadian Open, Canada	Masters 1000	Hard	(Russia) Daniil Medvedev	6–3, 6–0
Win	4–1	Aug 2019	US Open, United States	Grand Slam	Hard	(Russia) Daniil Medvedev	7–5, 6–3, 5–7, 4–6, 6–4

==== Team competitions: 2 (2 titles) ====
Result	W–L	Date	Tournament	Tier	Surface	Partner(s)	Opponents	Score
Win	1–0	Sep 2019	Laver Cup, Switzerland	Laver Cup	Hard (i)	(Switzerland) Roger Federer (Austria) Dominic Thiem (Germany) Alexander Zverev (Greece) Stefanos Tsitsipas (Italy) Fabio Fognini	(United States) John Isner (Canada) Milos Raonic (Australia) Nick Kyrgios (United States) Taylor Fritz (Canada) Denis Shapovalov (United States) Jack Sock	13–11
Win	2–0	Nov 2019	Davis Cup, Spain	Davis Cup	Hard (i)	(Spain) Roberto Bautista Agut (Spain) Pablo Carreño Busta (Spain) Marcel Granollers (Spain) Feliciano López	(Canada) Félix Auger-Aliassime (Canada) Vasek Pospisil (Canada) Brayden Schnur (Canada) Denis Shapovalov	2–0

=== Earnings ===
Event	Prize money	Year-to-date
Australian Open	A$2,050,000	$1,478,460
Mexican Open	$24,470	$1,502,930
Indian Wells Masters	$354,000	$1,856,930
Monte-Carlo Masters	€248,745	$2,135,822
Barcelona Open	€128,000	$2,279,694
Madrid Open	€312,215	$2,629,219
**Italian Open**	**€958,055**	$3,705,211
**French Open**	**€2,300,000**	$6,281,671
Wimbledon Championships	£588,000	$7,027,843
**Canadian Open**	**$1,049,040**	$8,076,883
**US Open**	**$3,850,000**	$11,926,883
Paris Masters	€259,730	$12,214,586
ATP Finals	$645,000	$12,859,586
Bonus pool	$3,490,000	$3,490,000
**Total**		**$16,349,586**

Figures in United States dollars (USD) unless noted.

== Television ==
At the Barcelona Open, the semifinals match versus Dominic Thiem had an average 914,000 viewers and 8.2% share on La 1.

At the Madrid Masters, the quarter-finals match versus Stanislas Wawrinka had an average 631,000 viewers, and the semifinals match versus Stefanos Tsitsipas had an average 912,000 viewers and 6.7% share, both on Teledeporte.

At the French Open, the semifinals match versus Roger Federer had an average 676,000 viewers and 3.7% share on DMAX and Eurosport. The final match versus Dominic Thiem had an average 2,480,000 viewers and a 19.5% share, also on DMAX and Eurosport.

At the US Open, the final match versus Daniil Medvedev averaged 575,000 viewers and a 6.1% share on Eurosport.

At the Laver Cup, the singles match versus Milos Raonic averaged 462,000 viewers and a 4.6% share, and the doubles match with Stefanos Tsitsipas versus John Isner / Jack Sock averaged 297,000 viewers and a 2,2% share, both on Teledeporte.

The Davis Cup final singles match versus Canada's Denis Shapovalov had an average 745,000 viewers and a 5.0% share on #Vamos.

== See also ==
- 2019 ATP Tour
- 2019 Roger Federer tennis season
- 2019 Novak Djokovic tennis season
