= 2019 Qatar ExxonMobil Open – Singles =

Singles
- 2019 Qatar ExxonMobil Open

Final
- Champion: (Spain) Roberto Bautista Agut
- Runner-up: (Czech Republic) Tomáš Berdych
- Score: 6–4, 3–6, 6–3

Details
- Draw: 32 (4 Q / 3 WC )
- Seeds: 8

Events
Singles	Doubles
- ATP Qatar Open

Roberto Bautista Agut defeated Tomáš Berdych in the final, 6–4, 3–6, 6–3 to win the singles tennis title at the 2019 ATP Qatar Open.

Gaël Monfils was the reigning champion, but did not participate this year.

== Seeds ==
1. (Serbia) Novak Djokovic (semifinals)
2. (Austria) Dominic Thiem (first round)
3. (Russia) Karen Khachanov (first round)
4. (Italy) Marco Cecchinato (semifinals)
5. (Georgia (country)) Nikoloz Basilashvili (quarterfinals)
6. (Belgium) David Goffin (first round)
7. (Spain) Roberto Bautista Agut (champion)
8. (Spain) Fernando Verdasco (second round)

== Draw ==
=== Finals ===
Semifinals
1	(Serbia) Novak Djokovic	6	6^{6}	4
7	(Spain) Roberto Bautista Agut	3	7^{8}	6
4	(Italy) Marco Cecchinato	6^{6}	3
WC	(Czech Republic) Tomáš Berdych	7^{8}	6

Final
7	(Spain) Roberto Bautista Agut	6	3	6
WC	(Czech Republic) Tomáš Berdych	4	6	3

=== Top half ===
First round
1	(Serbia) N Djokovic	6	6
(Bosnia and Herzegovina) D Džumhur	1	2
(Hungary) M Fucsovics	6	6
(Romania) M Copil	3	2
(Russia) A Rublev	7	6
(Italy) A Seppi	5	1
(Spain) A Ramos Viñolas	1	6	1
5	(Georgia (country)) N Basilashvili	6	1	6
3	(Russia) K Khachanov	6^{7}	4
(Switzerland) S Wawrinka	7^{9}	6
(Netherlands) R Haase	7^{9}	4	6^{4}
(Chile) N Jarry	6^{7}	6	7^{7}
WC	(Qatar) MS Zayid	1	3
Q	(Spain) G García López	6	6
(Italy) M Berrettini	1	4
7	(Spain) R Bautista Agut	6	6

Second round
1	(Serbia) N Djokovic	4	6	6
(Hungary) M Fucsovics	6	4	1
(Russia) A Rublev	3	4
5	(Georgia (country)) N Basilashvili	6	6
(Switzerland) S Wawrinka	6	7^{7}
(Chile) N Jarry	4	6^{3}
Q	(Spain) G García López	1	4
7	(Spain) R Bautista Agut	6	6

Quarterfinals
1	(Serbia) N Djokovic	4	6	6
5	(Georgia (country)) N Basilashvili	6	3	4
(Switzerland) S Wawrinka	4	4
7	(Spain) R Bautista Agut	6	6

Semifinals
1	(Serbia) N Djokovic	6	6^{6}	4
7	(Spain) R Bautista Agut	3	7^{8}	6

=== Bottom half ===
First round
6	(Belgium) D Goffin	6	4	6^{4}
Q	(Lithuania) R Berankis	3	6	7^{7}
(Serbia) D Lajović	6	7^{7}
(France) A Mannarino	3	6^{5}
(Argentina) G Pella	7^{7}	6
WC	(Turkey) C İlkel	6^{1}	3
Q	(Ukraine) S Stakhovsky	4	2
4	(Italy) M Cecchinato	6	6
8	(Spain) F Verdasco	6	6
LL	(Italy) P Lorenzi	3	4
(Germany) P Kohlschreiber	4	6^{5}
WC	(Czech Republic) T Berdych	6	7^{7}
Q	(Germany) M Marterer	6	6
(Germany) P Gojowczyk	1	4
(France) P-H Herbert	6	7
2	(Austria) D Thiem	3	5

Second round
Q	(Lithuania) R Berankis	6^{4}	6	5
(Serbia) D Lajović	7^{7}	0	7
(Argentina) G Pella
4	(Italy) M Cecchinato	w/o
8	(Spain) F Verdasco	6	3	5
WC	(Czech Republic) T Berdych	4	6	7
Q	(Germany) M Marterer	3	7^{8}	6^{6}
(France) P-H Herbert	6	6^{6}	7^{8}

Quarterfinals
(Serbia) D Lajović	6^{2}	2
4	(Italy) M Cecchinato	7^{7}	6
WC	(Czech Republic) T Berdych	6	6
(France) P-H Herbert	2	4

Semifinals
4	(Italy) M Cecchinato	6^{6}	3
WC	(Czech Republic) T Berdych	7^{8}	6

== Qualifying ==
=== Seeds ===
1. (Germany) Maximilian Marterer (qualified)
2. (Bosnia and Herzegovina) Mirza Bašić (qualifying competition)
3. (Spain) Guillermo García López (qualified)
4. (Italy) Paolo Lorenzi (qualifying competition, lucky loser)
5. (Sweden) Elias Ymer (withdrew)
6. (Lithuania) Ričardas Berankis (qualified)
7. (Argentina) Marco Trungelliti (qualifying competition)
8. (Cyprus) Marcos Baghdatis (qualifying competition)

=== Qualifiers ===
1. (Germany) Maximilian Marterer
2. (Ukraine) Sergiy Stakhovsky
3. (Spain) Guillermo García López
4. (Lithuania) Ričardas Berankis

=== Lucky loser ===
1. (Italy) Paolo Lorenzi

=== Qualifying draw ===
==== First qualifier ====
First round
1	(Germany) Maximilian Marterer	3	6	6
(Italy) Andrea Arnaboldi	6	2	3
WC	(Qatar) Mousa Shanan Zayed	0	1
7	(Argentina) Marco Trungelliti	6	6

Qualifying competition
1	(Germany) Maximilian Marterer	4	6	7
7	(Argentina) Marco Trungelliti	6	4	5

==== Second qualifier ====
First round
2	(Bosnia and Herzegovina) Mirza Bašić	6	6
(Germany) Matthias Bachinger	3	3
(Ukraine) Sergiy Stakhovsky	7^{7}	7
Alt	(Italy) Gian Marco Moroni	6^{5}	5

Qualifying competition
2	(Bosnia and Herzegovina) Mirza Bašić	6	2	3
(Ukraine) Sergiy Stakhovsky	3	6	6

==== Third qualifier ====
First round
3	(Spain) Guillermo García López	7^{8}	6
Alt	(United Kingdom) James Ward	6^{6}	2
(Czech Republic) Lukáš Rosol	0	6^{3}
8	(Cyprus) Marcos Baghdatis	6	7^{7}

Qualifying competition
3	(Spain) Guillermo García López	4	6	6
8	(Cyprus) Marcos Baghdatis	6	2	4

==== Fourth qualifier ====
First round
4	(Italy) Paolo Lorenzi	6	6
WC	(Qatar) Jabor Al-Mutawa	1	0
(Austria) Dennis Novak	4	3
6	(Lithuania) Ričardas Berankis	6	6

Qualifying competition
4	(Italy) Paolo Lorenzi	4	6^{4}
6	(Lithuania) Ričardas Berankis	6	7^{7}
