= 2019 Qatar ExxonMobil Open – Doubles =

Doubles
- 2019 Qatar ExxonMobil Open

Final
- Champions: (Belgium) David Goffin (France) Pierre-Hugues Herbert
- Runners-up: (Netherlands) Robin Haase (Netherlands) Matwé Middelkoop
- Score: 5–7, 6–4, [10–4]

Details
- Draw: 16
- Seeds: 4

Events
Singles	Doubles
← 2018 ·	ATP Qatar Open	· 2020 →

Oliver Marach and Mate Pavić were the defending champions but lost in the first round to Damir Džumhur and Dušan Lajović.

David Goffin and Pierre-Hugues Herbert won the title, defeating Robin Haase and Matwé Middelkoop in the final, 5–7, 6–4, [10–4].

== Seeds ==
1. (Austria) Oliver Marach / (Croatia) Mate Pavić (first round)
2. (United Kingdom) Jamie Murray / (Brazil) Bruno Soares (first round)
3. (Croatia) Nikola Mektić / (Austria) Alexander Peya (quarterfinals)
4. (United Kingdom) Dominic Inglot / (Croatia) Franko Škugor (first round)

== Draw ==
=== Key ===
- Q = Qualifier
- WC = Wild card
- LL = Lucky loser
- Alt = Alternate
- SE = Special exempt
- PR = Protected ranking
- ITF = ITF entry
- JE = Junior exempt
- w/o = Walkover
- r = Retired
- d = Defaulted
- SR = Special ranking

=== Draw ===
First round
1	(Austria) O Marach (Croatia) M Pavić	4	6	[7]
(Bosnia and Herzegovina) D Džumhur (Serbia) D Lajović	6	1	[10]
WC	(Serbia) M Djokovic (Serbia) N Djokovic	6	3	[10]
WC	(Turkey) C İlkel (Qatar) MS Zayid	3	6	[6]
3	(Croatia) N Mektić (Austria) A Peya	6	7^{7}
(Romania) M Copil (Romania) H Tecău	4	6^{4}
(Belgium) D Goffin (France) P-H Herbert	7	6
(Russia) K Khachanov (Switzerland) S Wawrinka	5	3
(Argentina) M González (Chile) N Jarry	6	6
(Spain) A Ramos Viñolas (Spain) F Verdasco	3	4
(Netherlands) R Haase (Netherlands) M Middelkoop	3	6	[10]
4	(United Kingdom) D Inglot (Croatia) F Škugor	6	3	[7]
(Italy) M Cecchinato (Italy) A Seppi	3	2
(Mexico) S González (Pakistan) A-u-H Qureshi	6	6
(Hungary) M Fucsovics (Argentina) G Pella	6	6
2	(United Kingdom) J Murray (Brazil) B Soares	3	4

Quarterfinals
(Bosnia and Herzegovina) D Džumhur (Serbia) D Lajović	5	6	[7]
WC	(Serbia) M Djokovic (Serbia) N Djokovic	7	3	[10]
3	(Croatia) N Mektić (Austria) A Peya	2	6	[3]
(Belgium) D Goffin (France) P-H Herbert	6	3	[10]
(Argentina) M González (Chile) N Jarry	2	4
(Netherlands) R Haase (Netherlands) M Middelkoop	6	6
(Mexico) S González (Pakistan) A-u-H Qureshi	w/o
(Hungary) M Fucsovics (Argentina) G Pella

Semifinals
WC	(Serbia) M Djokovic (Serbia) N Djokovic	1	6	[13]
(Belgium) D Goffin (France) P-H Herbert	6	3	[15]
(Netherlands) R Haase (Netherlands) M Middelkoop	6	6
(Mexico) S González (Pakistan) A-u-H Qureshi	4	1

Final
(Belgium) D Goffin (France) P-H Herbert	5	6	[10]
(Netherlands) R Haase (Netherlands) M Middelkoop	7	4	[4]
