= 2019 Monte-Carlo Masters – Doubles =

Doubles
- 2019 Monte-Carlo Masters

Final
- Champions: (Croatia) Nikola Mektić (Croatia) Franko Škugor
- Runners-up: (Netherlands) Robin Haase (Netherlands) Wesley Koolhof
- Score: 6–7^{(3–7)}, 7–6^{(7–3)}, [11–9]

Events
Singles	Doubles
← 2018 ·	Monte-Carlo Masters	· 2021 →

Nikola Mektić and Franko Škugor won the title, defeating Robin Haase and Wesley Koolhof in the final, 6–7^{(3–7)}, 7–6^{(7–3)}, [11–9]. They saved a championship point in the third-set tiebreak.

Bob and Mike Bryan were the defending champions, but chose not to participate this year.

== Seeds ==
1. (France) Pierre-Hugues Herbert / (France) Nicolas Mahut (first round)
2. (Poland) Łukasz Kubot / (Brazil) Marcelo Melo (quarterfinals)
3. (United Kingdom) Jamie Murray / (Brazil) Bruno Soares (semifinals)
4. (Colombia) Juan Sebastián Cabal / (Colombia) Robert Farah (second round)
5. (Austria) Oliver Marach / (Croatia) Mate Pavić (second round)
6. (Finland) Henri Kontinen / (Australia) John Peers (second round)
7. (Croatia) Nikola Mektić / (Croatia) Franko Škugor (champions)
8. (South Africa) Raven Klaasen / (United Kingdom) Joe Salisbury (first round)

== Draw ==
Key

- Q = Qualifier
- WC = Wild card
- LL = Lucky loser
- Alt = Alternate
- ITF = ITF entry
- PR = Protected ranking
- SR = Special ranking
- SE = Special exempt
- JE = Junior exempt
- JR = Junior Accelerator Programme entrant
- CO = College Accelerator Programme entrant
- NG = Next Gen Accelerator Program entrant
- w/o = Walkover
- r = Retired
- d = Defaulted

=== Finals ===
Semifinals
(Netherlands) Robin Haase (Netherlands) Wesley Koolhof	7^{7}	6
3	(United Kingdom) Jamie Murray (Brazil) Bruno Soares	6^{4}	4
(Argentina) Máximo González (Argentina) Horacio Zeballos	4	3
7	(Croatia) Nikola Mektić (Croatia) Franko Škugor	6	6

Final
(Netherlands) Robin Haase (Netherlands) Wesley Koolhof	7^{7}	6^{3}	[9]
7	(Croatia) Nikola Mektić (Croatia) Franko Škugor	6^{3}	7^{7}	[11]

=== Top half ===
First round
1	(France) P-H Herbert (France) N Mahut	6^{4}	6^{2}
(Netherlands) R Haase (Netherlands) W Koolhof	7^{7}	7^{7}
(Germany) A Zverev (Germany) M Zverev	4	6	[10]
WC	(Monaco) R Arneodo (Monaco) H Nys	6	4	[7]
(Hungary) M Fucsovics (Argentina) G Pella	6	6
(Italy) M Berrettini (Italy) F Fognini	4	3
(Moldova) R Albot (Georgia (country)) N Basilashvili	6	6^{5}	[10]
8	(South Africa) R Klaasen (United Kingdom) J Salisbury	3	7^{7}	[7]
3	(United Kingdom) J Murray (Brazil) B Soares	4	6	[13]
(India) R Bopanna (United Kingdom) D Inglot	6	3	[11]
(Croatia) I Dodig (France) É Roger-Vasselin	6	6
(Serbia) L Đere (India) D Sharan	2	1
(United Kingdom) K Edmund (United Kingdom) N Skupski	7	4	[5]
(Argentina) D Schwartzman (Portugal) J Sousa	5	6	[10]
(Bulgaria) G Dimitrov (Switzerland) S Wawrinka	6^{6}	3
6	(Finland) H Kontinen (Australia) J Peers	7^{8}	6

Second round
(Netherlands) R Haase (Netherlands) W Koolhof	6^{8}	6	[10]
(Germany) A Zverev (Germany) M Zverev	7^{10}	4	[8]
(Hungary) M Fucsovics (Argentina) G Pella	1	7^{9}	[6]
(Moldova) R Albot (Georgia (country)) N Basilashvili	6	6^{7}	[10]
3	(United Kingdom) J Murray (Brazil) B Soares	7^{7}	6^{4}	[10]
(Croatia) I Dodig (France) É Roger-Vasselin	6^{5}	7^{7}	[8]
(Argentina) D Schwartzman (Portugal) J Sousa	6	6
6	(Finland) H Kontinen (Australia) J Peers	4	3

Quarterfinals
(Netherlands) R Haase (Netherlands) W Koolhof	6	7
(Moldova) R Albot (Georgia (country)) N Basilashvili	1	5
3	(United Kingdom) J Murray (Brazil) B Soares	7	6
(Argentina) D Schwartzman (Portugal) J Sousa	5	2

Semifinals
(Netherlands) R Haase (Netherlands) W Koolhof	7^{7}	6
3	(United Kingdom) J Murray (Brazil) B Soares	6^{4}	4

=== Bottom half ===
First round
5	(Austria) O Marach (Croatia) M Pavić	5	7^{7}	[11]
(Japan) B McLachlan (Germany) J-L Struff	7	6^{4}	[9]
(Italy) M Cecchinato (Italy) A Seppi	3	4
(Argentina) M González (Argentina) H Zeballos	6	6
(Belgium) D Goffin (France) L Pouille	5	3
(Brazil) M Demoliner (Russia) D Medvedev	7	6
WC	(Serbia) M Djokovic (Serbia) N Djokovic	1	3
4	(Colombia) JS Cabal (Colombia) R Farah	6	6
7	(Croatia) N Mektić (Croatia) F Škugor	6	7
(Netherlands) M Middelkoop (Greece) S Tsitsipas	3	5
(Russia) K Khachanov (Spain) F López	6	6
(Netherlands) J-J Rojer (Romania) H Tecău	4	3
WC	(Austria) J Melzer (Austria) D Thiem	6	7
Alt	(Germany) P Kohlschreiber (Spain) F Verdasco	4	5
(Spain) M Granollers (Spain) M López	6^{8}	4
2	(Poland) Ł Kubot (Brazil) M Melo	7^{10}	6

Second round
5	(Austria) O Marach (Croatia) M Pavić	3	6	[6]
(Argentina) M González (Argentina) H Zeballos	6	3	[10]
(Brazil) M Demoliner (Russia) D Medvedev	6	6
4	(Colombia) JS Cabal (Colombia) R Farah	2	4
7	(Croatia) N Mektić (Croatia) F Škugor	3	6	[10]
(Russia) K Khachanov (Spain) F López	6	3	[4]
WC	(Austria) J Melzer (Austria) D Thiem	3	4
2	(Poland) Ł Kubot (Brazil) M Melo	6	6

Quarterfinals
(Argentina) M González (Argentina) H Zeballos	w/o
(Brazil) M Demoliner (Russia) D Medvedev
7	(Croatia) N Mektić (Croatia) F Škugor	6	7
2	(Poland) Ł Kubot (Brazil) M Melo	3	5

Semifinals
(Argentina) M González (Argentina) H Zeballos	4	3
7	(Croatia) N Mektić (Croatia) F Škugor	6	6
