= 2019 Rakuten Japan Open Tennis Championships – Doubles =

Doubles
- 2019 Rakuten Japan Open Tennis Championships

Final
- Champions: (France) Nicolas Mahut (France) Édouard Roger-Vasselin
- Runners-up: (Croatia) Nikola Mektić (Croatia) Franko Škugor
- Score: 7–6^{(9–7)}, 6–4

Details
- Draw: 16 (1Q / 2WC)
- Seeds: 4

Events
Singles	Doubles
- Japan Open

Ben McLachlan and Jan-Lennard Struff were the defending champions, but chose not to participate together. McLachlan teamed up with Luke Bambridge, but lost in the first round to Divij Sharan and Artem Sitak. Struff played alongside Lucas Pouille, but lost in the semifinals to Nikola Mektić and Franko Škugor.

Nicolas Mahut and Édouard Roger-Vasselin won the title, defeating Mektić and Škugor in the final, 7–6^{(9–7)}, 6–4.

== Seeds ==
1. (Spain) Marcel Granollers / (Argentina) Horacio Zeballos (first round)
2. (France) Nicolas Mahut / (France) Édouard Roger-Vasselin (champions)
3. (United States) Rajeev Ram / (United Kingdom) Joe Salisbury (quarterfinals)
4. (Croatia) Mate Pavić / (Brazil) Bruno Soares (quarterfinals)

== Draw ==
Key

- Q = Qualifier
- WC = Wild card
- LL = Lucky loser
- Alt = Alternate
- ITF = ITF entry
- PR = Protected ranking
- SR = Special ranking
- SE = Special exempt
- JE = Junior exempt
- JR = Junior Accelerator Programme entrant
- CO = College Accelerator Programme entrant
- NG = Next Gen Accelerator Program entrant
- w/o = Walkover
- r = Retired
- d = Defaulted

=== Draw ===
First round
1	(Spain) M Granollers (Argentina) H Zeballos	4	6^{3}
(Croatia) N Mektić (Croatia) F Škugor	6	7^{7}
(India) R Bopanna (Canada) D Shapovalov	6	7^{7}
WC	(France) F Martin (Japan) Y Uchiyama	3	6^{3}
3	(United States) R Ram (United Kingdom) J Salisbury	3	7^{7}	[10]
(New Zealand) M Daniell (Austria) P Oswald	6	6^{4}	[7]
(Austria) O Marach (Austria) J Melzer	4	7^{7}	[8]
(France) L Pouille (Germany) J-L Struff	6	6^{4}	[10]
(United Kingdom) D Inglot (United States) A Krajicek	6	6
(Netherlands) J-J Rojer (Romania) H Tecău	1	3
(Serbia) N Djokovic (Serbia) F Krajinović	2	6	[4]
4	(Croatia) M Pavić (Brazil) B Soares	6	4	[10]
Q	(India) D Sharan (New Zealand) A Sitak	6	6
WC	(United Kingdom) L Bambridge (Japan) B McLachlan	2	3
(Poland) H Hurkacz (France) B Paire	4	4
2	(France) N Mahut (France) É Roger-Vasselin	6	6

Quarterfinals
(Croatia) N Mektić (Croatia) F Škugor	6	5	[11]
(India) R Bopanna (Canada) D Shapovalov	4	7	[9]
3	(United States) R Ram (United Kingdom) J Salisbury	6	4	[9]
(France) L Pouille (Germany) J-L Struff	3	6	[11]
(United Kingdom) D Inglot (United States) A Krajicek	7^{8}	7^{8}
4	(Croatia) M Pavić (Brazil) B Soares	6^{6}	6^{6}
Q	(India) D Sharan (New Zealand) A Sitak	6^{5}	3
2	(France) N Mahut (France) É Roger-Vasselin	7^{7}	6

Semifinals
(Croatia) N Mektić (Croatia) F Škugor	7^{7}	7^{7}
(France) L Pouille (Germany) J-L Struff	6^{5}	6^{3}
(United Kingdom) D Inglot (United States) A Krajicek	4	5
2	(France) N Mahut (France) É Roger-Vasselin	6	7

Final
(Croatia) N Mektić (Croatia) F Škugor	6^{7}	4
2	(France) N Mahut (France) É Roger-Vasselin	7^{9}	6

== Qualifying ==
=== Seeds ===
1. (India) Divij Sharan / (New Zealand) Artem Sitak (qualified)
2. (Mexico) Santiago González / (Pakistan) Aisam-ul-Haq Qureshi (qualifying competition)

=== Qualifiers ===
1. (India) Divij Sharan / (New Zealand) Artem Sitak

=== Qualifying draw ===
First round				Qualifying competition
				1	(India) Divij Sharan (New Zealand) Artem Sitak	7^{7}	7^{7}
				2	(Mexico) Santiago González (Pakistan) Aisam-ul-Haq Qureshi	6^{4}	6^{5}
WC	(Japan) Toshihide Matsui (Japan) Yoshihito Nishioka	6^{4}	4	2	(Mexico) Santiago González (Pakistan) Aisam-ul-Haq Qureshi	6^{4}	6^{5}
2	(Mexico) Santiago González (Pakistan) Aisam-ul-Haq Qureshi	7^{7}	6
