= 2019 Qatar ExxonMobil Open =

- Date: 31 December 2018 – 5 January 2019
- Edition: 27th
- Category: ATP Tour 250 series
- Draw: 32S / 16D
- Surface: Hard / outdoor
- Location: Doha, Qatar
- Venue: Khalifa International Tennis and Squash Complex

Champions

Singles
- (Spain) Roberto Bautista Agut

Doubles
- (Belgium) David Goffin / (France) Pierre-Hugues Herbert
← 2018 ·	ATP Qatar Open	· 2020 →

The 2019 Qatar Open (also known as 2019 Qatar ExxonMobil Open for sponsorship reasons) was a men's tennis tournament played on outdoor hard courts. It was the 27th edition of the Qatar Open, and part of the ATP Tour 250 series of the 2019 ATP Tour. It took place at the Khalifa International Tennis and Squash Complex in Doha, Qatar, from 31 December 2018 until 5 January 2019. Seventh-seeded Roberto Bautista Agut won the singles title.

== Finals ==
=== Singles ===
- (Spain) Roberto Bautista Agut defeated (Czech Republic) Tomáš Berdych, 6–4, 3–6, 6–3

=== Doubles ===
- (Belgium) David Goffin / (France) Pierre-Hugues Herbert defeated (Netherlands) Robin Haase / (Netherlands) Matwé Middelkoop, 5–7, 6–4, [10–4]

== Singles main-draw entrants ==
=== Seeds ===
Country	Player	Rank^{1}	Seed
SRB	Novak Djokovic	1	1
AUT	Dominic Thiem	8	2
RUS	Karen Khachanov	11	3
ITA	Marco Cecchinato	20	4
GEO	Nikoloz Basilashvili	21	5
BEL	David Goffin	22	6
ESP	Roberto Bautista Agut	24	7
ESP	Fernando Verdasco	28	8

- ^{1} Rankings are as of 24 December 2018.

=== Other entrants ===
The following players received wildcards into the singles main draw:

- (Czech Republic) Tomáš Berdych
- (Turkey) Cem İlkel
- (Qatar) Mubarak Shannan Zayid

The following players received entry from the qualifying draw:

- (Lithuania) Ričardas Berankis
- (Spain) Guillermo García López
- (Germany) Maximilian Marterer
- (Ukraine) Sergiy Stakhovsky

The following player received entry by a lucky loser:

- (Italy) Paolo Lorenzi

=== Withdrawals ===
- (France) Richard Gasquet → replaced by (Switzerland) Stan Wawrinka
- (Kazakhstan) Mikhail Kukushkin → replaced by (Russia) Andrey Rublev
- (Spain) Feliciano López → replaced by (Italy) Paolo Lorenzi

== Doubles main-draw entrants ==
=== Seeds ===
Country	Player	Country	Player	Rank^{1}	Seed
AUT	Oliver Marach	CRO	Mate Pavić	7	1
GBR	Jamie Murray	BRA	Bruno Soares	14	2
CRO	Nikola Mektić	AUT	Alexander Peya	30	3
GBR	Dominic Inglot	CRO	Franko Škugor	48	4

- ^{1} Rankings are as of 24 December 2018.

=== Other entrants ===
The following pairs received wildcards into the doubles main draw:

- (Serbia) Marko Djokovic / (Serbia) Novak Djokovic
- (Turkey) Cem İlkel / (Qatar) Mubarak Shannan Zayid
