= 2019 Rakuten Japan Open Tennis Championships – Singles =

Singles
- 2019 Rakuten Japan Open Tennis Championships

Final
- Champion: (Serbia) Novak Djokovic
- Runner-up: (Australia) John Millman
- Score: 6–3, 6–2

Details
- Draw: 32 (4Q / 3WC)
- Seeds: 8

Events
Singles	Doubles
← 2018 ·	Japan Open	· 2022 →

Novak Djokovic defeated John Millman in the final, 6–3, 6–2 to win the 2019 Japan Open.

Daniil Medvedev was the reigning champion, but did not defend his title.

== Seeds ==
1. (Serbia) Novak Djokovic (champion)
2. (Croatia) Borna Ćorić (first round)
3. (Belgium) David Goffin (semifinals)
4. (France) Benoît Paire (first round)
5. (France) Lucas Pouille (quarterfinals)
6. (Croatia) Marin Čilić (second round)
7. (United States) Taylor Fritz (first round)
8. (Australia) Alex de Minaur (first round)

== Draw ==
=== Key ===
- Q = Qualifier
- WC = Wild card
- LL = Lucky loser
- Alt = Alternate
- SE = Special exempt
- PR = Protected ranking
- ITF = ITF entry
- JE = Junior exempt
- w/o = Walkover
- r = Retired
- d = Defaulted
- SR = Special ranking

=== Finals ===
Semifinals
1	(Serbia) Novak Djokovic	6	6
3	(Belgium) David Goffin	3	4
(United States) Reilly Opelka	3	6^{4}
Q	(Australia) John Millman	6	7^{7}

Final
1	(Serbia) Novak Djokovic	6	6
Q	(Australia) John Millman	3	2

=== Top half ===
First round
1	(Serbia) N Djokovic	6	6
Q	(Australia) A Popyrin	4	2
(Germany) J-L Struff	6	6^{4}	3
WC	(Japan) G Soeda	4	7^{7}	6
(Japan) Y Nishioka	7	6
(Portugal) J Sousa	5	3
(Poland) H Hurkacz	4	3
5	(France) L Pouille	6	6
3	(Belgium) D Goffin	1	7^{10}	6
(Spain) P Carreño Busta	6	6^{8}	0
(Canada) D Shapovalov	6	6
(Serbia) M Kecmanović	4	4
(Italy) L Sonego	6	3	4
(South Korea) H Chung	3	6	6
WC	(Japan) Y Sugita	4	4
6	(Croatia) M Čilić	6	6

Second round
1	(Serbia) N Djokovic	6	7
WC	(Japan) G Soeda	3	5
(Japan) Y Nishioka	1	2
5	(France) L Pouille	6	6
3	(Belgium) D Goffin	7^{7}	7^{7}
(Canada) D Shapovalov	6^{5}	6^{2}
(South Korea) H Chung	6	3	6
6	(Croatia) M Čilić	4	6	1

Quarterfinals
1	(Serbia) N Djokovic	6	6
5	(France) L Pouille	1	2
3	(Belgium) D Goffin	6	6
(South Korea) H Chung	2	2

Semifinals
1	(Serbia) N Djokovic	6	6
3	(Belgium) D Goffin	3	4

=== Bottom half ===
First round
7	(United States) T Fritz	3	4
(United States) R Opelka	6	6
Q	(Spain) P Andújar	4	0
(France) G Simon	6	6
(Moldova) R Albot	6	7
(Serbia) F Krajinović	3	5
Q	(Japan) Y Uchiyama	6	6
4	(France) B Paire	2	2
8	(Australia) A de Minaur	3	7^{8}	6^{8}
SE	(South Africa) L Harris	6	6^{6}	7^{10}
Q	(Australia) J Millman	4	6	6
(France) A Mannarino	6	3	4
(Australia) J Thompson	6	3	6
(Argentina) JI Londero	3	6	3
WC	(Japan) T Daniel	6	4	7^{7}
2	(Croatia) B Ćorić	4	6	6^{5}

Second round
(United States) R Opelka	7^{7}	7^{7}
(France) G Simon	6^{4}	6^{2}
(Moldova) R Albot	7^{7}	3	4
Q	(Japan) Y Uchiyama	6^{2}	6	6
SE	(South Africa) L Harris	3	2
Q	(Australia) J Millman	6	6
(Australia) J Thompson	4	6^{3}
WC	(Japan) T Daniel	6	7^{7}

Quarterfinals
(United States) R Opelka	6	6
Q	(Japan) Y Uchiyama	3	3
Q	(Australia) J Millman	6	6
WC	(Japan) T Daniel	4	0

Semifinals
(United States) R Opelka	3	6^{4}
Q	(Australia) J Millman	6	7^{7}

== Qualifying ==
=== Seeds ===
1. (Spain) Pablo Andújar (qualified)
2. (Chile) Nicolás Jarry (first round)
3. (Australia) John Millman (qualified)
4. (Italy) Thomas Fabbiano (first round)
5. (Australia) Alexei Popyrin (qualified)
6. (South Korea) Kwon Soon-woo (qualifying competition)
7. (Germany) Peter Gojowczyk (first round)
8. (United States) Steve Johnson (first round)

=== Qualifiers ===
1. (Spain) Pablo Andújar
2. (Japan) Yasutaka Uchiyama
3. (Australia) John Millman
4. (Australia) Alexei Popyrin

=== Qualifying draw ===
==== First qualifier ====
First round
1	(Spain) Pablo Andújar	6	6
(Canada) Brayden Schnur	0	0
(Switzerland) Henri Laaksonen	6^{5}	2
6	(South Korea) Kwon Soon-woo	7^{7}	6

Qualifying competition
1	(Spain) Pablo Andújar	7	6
6	(South Korea) Kwon Soon-woo	5	4

==== Second qualifier ====
First round
2	(Chile) Nicolás Jarry	1	6	2
(Spain) Marcel Granollers	6	1	6
WC	(Japan) Yasutaka Uchiyama	6	6
8	(United States) Steve Johnson	3	3

Qualifying competition
(Spain) Marcel Granollers	3	4
WC	(Japan) Yasutaka Uchiyama	6	6

==== Third qualifier ====
First round
3	(Australia) John Millman	3	7^{11}	6
(United States) Bradley Klahn	6	6^{9}	2
WC	(Japan) Tatsuma Ito	5	6	6
7	(Germany) Peter Gojowczyk	7	1	4

Qualifying competition
3	(Australia) John Millman	7^{7}	6
WC	(Japan) Tatsuma Ito	6^{5}	1

==== Fourth qualifier ====
First round
4	(Italy) Thomas Fabbiano	2	3
(Australia) James Duckworth	6	6
WC	(Japan) Yosuke Watanuki	6	1	4
5	(Australia) Alexei Popyrin	4	6	6

Qualifying competition
(Australia) James Duckworth	3	6^{0}
5	(Australia) Alexei Popyrin	6	7^{7}
