= 2019 Rakuten Japan Open Tennis Championships =

- Date: 30 September – 6 October
- Edition: 46th
- Category: ATP Tour 500
- Draw: 32S/16D
- Surface: Hard / outdoor
- Location: Tokyo, Japan
- Venue: Ariake Coliseum

Champions

Singles
- (Serbia) Novak Djokovic

Doubles
- (France) Nicolas Mahut / (France) Édouard Roger-Vasselin
- Japan Open

The 2019 Rakuten Japan Open Tennis Championships was a men's tennis tournament played on outdoor hard courts. It was the 46th edition of the Japan Open, and part of the ATP Tour 500 series of the 2019 ATP Tour. It was held at the Ariake Coliseum in Tokyo, Japan, from September 30 through October 6, 2019. First-seeded Novak Djokovic won the singles title.

== Finals ==
=== Singles ===
- (Serbia) Novak Djokovic defeated (Australia) John Millman 6–3, 6–2

=== Doubles ===
- (France) Nicolas Mahut / (France) Édouard Roger-Vasselin defeated (Croatia) Nikola Mektić / (Croatia) Franko Škugor, 7–6^{(9–7)}, 6–4

== Singles main-draw entrants ==
=== Seeds ===
Country	Player	Rank^{1}	Seed
SRB	Novak Djokovic	1	1
CRO	Borna Ćorić	14	2
BEL	David Goffin	15	3
FRA	Benoît Paire	23	4
FRA	Lucas Pouille	24	5
CRO	Marin Čilić	28	6
USA	Taylor Fritz	30	7
AUS	Alex de Minaur	31	8

- ^{1} Rankings are as of September 23, 2019.

=== Other entrants ===
The following players received wildcards into the singles main draw:

- (Japan) Taro Daniel
- (Japan) Go Soeda
- (Japan) Yūichi Sugita

The following player received entry as a special exempt:

- (South Africa) Lloyd Harris

The following players received entry from the qualifying draw:

- (Spain) Pablo Andújar
- (Australia) John Millman
- (Australia) Alexei Popyrin
- (Japan) Yasutaka Uchiyama

=== Withdrawals ===
Before the tournament

- (South Africa) Kevin Anderson → replaced by (Italy) Lorenzo Sonego
- (Serbia) Laslo Đere → replaced by (Argentina) Juan Ignacio Londero
- (France) Pierre-Hugues Herbert → replaced by (Australia) Jordan Thompson
- (Japan) Kei Nishikori → replaced by (Serbia) Miomir Kecmanović
- (Canada) Milos Raonic → replaced by (Japan) Yoshihito Nishioka
- (Switzerland) Stan Wawrinka → replaced by (Serbia) Filip Krajinović

== Doubles main-draw entrants ==
=== Seeds ===
Country	Player	Country	Player	Rank^{1}	Seed
ESP	Marcel Granollers	ARG	Horacio Zeballos	12	1
FRA	Nicolas Mahut	FRA	Édouard Roger-Vasselin	35	2
USA	Rajeev Ram	GBR	Joe Salisbury	39	3
CRO	Mate Pavić	BRA	Bruno Soares	39	4

- Rankings are as of September 23, 2019.

=== Other entrants ===
The following pairs received wildcards into the doubles main draw:

- (United Kingdom) Luke Bambridge / (Japan) Ben McLachlan
- (France) Fabrice Martin / (Japan) Yasutaka Uchiyama

The following pair received entry from the qualifying draw:

- (India) Divij Sharan / (New Zealand) Artem Sitak
