= 2019 Monte-Carlo Masters – Singles =

Singles
- 2019 Monte-Carlo Masters

Final
- Champion: (Italy) Fabio Fognini
- Runner-up: (Serbia) Dušan Lajović
- Score: 6−3, 6−4

Details
- Draw: 56 (7 Q / 4 WC )
- Seeds: 17

Events
Singles	Doubles
← 2018 ·	Monte-Carlo Masters	· 2021 →

Fabio Fognini defeated Dušan Lajović in the final, 6–3, 6–4 to win the singles tennis title at the 2019 Monte-Carlo Masters. It was his first and only ATP Tour Masters 1000 title.

Rafael Nadal was the three-time defending champion, but lost in the semifinals to Fognini.

== Seeds ==
The top eight seeds receive a bye into the second round.

1. (Serbia) Novak Djokovic (quarterfinals)
2. (Spain) Rafael Nadal (semifinals)
3. (Germany) Alexander Zverev (third round)
4. (Austria) Dominic Thiem (third round)
5. (Japan) Kei Nishikori (second round)
6. (Greece) Stefanos Tsitsipas (third round)
7. (Croatia) Marin Čilić (second round)
8. (Russia) Karen Khachanov (second round)
9. (Croatia) Borna Ćorić (quarterfinals)
10. (Russia) Daniil Medvedev (semifinals)
11. (Italy) Marco Cecchinato (third round)
12. (Georgia (country)) Nikoloz Basilashvili (first round)
13. (Italy) Fabio Fognini (champion)
14. (France) ~~Gaël Monfils~~ (withdrew)
15. (Canada) Denis Shapovalov (first round)
16. (Belgium) David Goffin (second round)
17. (United Kingdom) Kyle Edmund (first round)

Click on the seed number of a player to go to their draw section.

== Draw ==
=== Key ===
- Q = Qualifier
- WC = Wild card
- LL = Lucky loser
- Alt = Alternate
- ITF = ITF entry
- PR = Protected ranking
- SR = Special ranking
- SE = Special exempt
- JE = Junior exempt
- JR = Junior Accelerator Programme entrant
- CO = College Accelerator Programme entrant
- NG = Next Gen Accelerator Program entrant
- w/o = Walkover
- r = Retired
- d = Defaulted

=== Finals ===
Quarterfinals
1	(Serbia) Novak Djokovic	3	6	2
10	(Russia) Daniil Medvedev	6	4	6
(Serbia) Dušan Lajović	6	7
Q	(Italy) Lorenzo Sonego	4	5
9	(Croatia) Borna Ćorić	6	3	2
13	(Italy) Fabio Fognini	1	6	6
(Argentina) Guido Pella	6^{1}	3
2	(Spain) Rafael Nadal	7^{7}	6

Semifinals
10	(Russia) Daniil Medvedev	5	1
(Serbia) Dušan Lajović	7	6
13	(Italy) Fabio Fognini	6	6
2	(Spain) Rafael Nadal	4	2

Final
(Serbia) Dušan Lajović	3	4
13	(Italy) Fabio Fognini	6	6

=== Top half ===
==== Section 1 ====
First round
LL	(Japan) T Daniel	1	3
(Germany) P Kohlschreiber	6	6
PR	(France) J-W Tsonga	4	0^{r}
(United States) T Fritz	6	2
(Argentina) D Schwartzman	4	6	6
17	(United Kingdom) K Edmund	6	3	1
10	(Russia) D Medvedev	6	6
(Portugal) J Sousa	1	1
Q	(Slovenia) A Bedene	4	2
(Moldova) R Albot	6	6
(France) J Chardy	3	4
(Kazakhstan) M Kukushkin	6	6

Second round
1	(Serbia) N Djokovic	6	4	6
(Germany) P Kohlschreiber	3	6	4
(United States) T Fritz	6	6
(Argentina) D Schwartzman	4	2
10	(Russia) D Medvedev	6	6
(Moldova) R Albot	1	2
(Kazakhstan) M Kukushkin	3	5
6	(Greece) S Tsitsipas	6	7

Third round
1	(Serbia) N Djokovic	6	6
(United States) T Fritz	3	0
10	(Russia) D Medvedev	6	1	6
6	(Greece) S Tsitsipas	2	6	4

Quarterfinals
1	(Serbia) N Djokovic	3	6	2
10	(Russia) D Medvedev	6	4	6

==== Section 2 ====
First round
Q	(Argentina) F Delbonis	6^{3}	5
(Slovakia) M Kližan	7^{7}	7
Alt	(Tunisia) M Jaziri	4	4
(Serbia) D Lajović	6	6
Q	(Argentina) G Andreozzi	1	4
16	(Belgium) D Goffin	6	6
12	(Georgia (country)) N Basilashvili	5	6	1
(Hungary) M Fucsovics	7	3	6
(France) A Mannarino	4	3
(United Kingdom) C Norrie	6	6
(Italy) A Seppi	6^{4}	4
Q	(Italy) L Sonego	7^{7}	6

Second round
4	(Austria) D Thiem	6	6
(Slovakia) M Kližan	1	4
(Serbia) D Lajović	6	6
16	(Belgium) D Goffin	3	4
(Hungary) M Fucsovics	6^{3}	3
(United Kingdom) C Norrie	7^{7}	6
Q	(Italy) L Sonego	7^{7}	6
8	(Russia) K Khachanov	6^{4}	4

Third round
4	(Austria) D Thiem	3	3
(Serbia) D Lajović	6	6
(United Kingdom) C Norrie	2	5
Q	(Italy) L Sonego	6	7

Quarterfinals
(Serbia) D Lajović	6	7
Q	(Italy) L Sonego	4	5

=== Bottom half ===
==== Section 3 ====
First round
(Spain) F Verdasco	4	4
(France) P-H Herbert	6	6
WC	(Monaco) L Catarina	0	3
WC	(Spain) J Munar	6	6
(Poland) H Hurkacz	4	7	5
9	(Croatia) B Ćorić	6	5	7
13	(Italy) F Fognini	4	7	6
Q	(Russia) A Rublev	6	5	4
(France) G Simon	7	6
Q	(Australia) A Popyrin	5	1
WC	(Canada) F Auger-Aliassime	7	7^{7}
Q	(Argentina) JI Londero	5	6^{5}

Second round
5	(Japan) K Nishikori	5	4
(France) P-H Herbert	7	6
WC	(Spain) J Munar	7^{7}	6^{7}	4
9	(Croatia) B Ćorić	6^{3}	7^{9}	6
13	(Italy) F Fognini	w/o
(France) G Simon
WC	(Canada) F Auger-Aliassime	1	4
3	(Germany) A Zverev	6	6

Third round
(France) P-H Herbert	4	2
9	(Croatia) B Ćorić	6	6
13	(Italy) F Fognini	7^{8}	6
3	(Germany) A Zverev	6^{6}	1

Quarterfinals
9	(Croatia) B Ćorić	6	3	2
13	(Italy) F Fognini	1	6	6

==== Section 4 ====
First round
(Serbia) L Đere	7^{7}	2	4
(Argentina) G Pella	6^{2}	6	6
(France) L Pouille	5	3
(Switzerland) S Wawrinka	7	6
(Bosnia and Herzegovina) D Džumhur	0^{r}
11	(Italy) M Cecchinato	4
15	(Canada) D Shapovalov	7	3	1
(Germany) J-L Struff	5	6	6
(Italy) M Berrettini	5	4
(Bulgaria) G Dimitrov	7	6
(Spain) R Bautista Agut	3	6	6
(Australia) J Millman	6	1	1

Second round
7	(Croatia) M Čilić	3	7	1
(Argentina) G Pella	6	5	6
(Switzerland) S Wawrinka	6	5	3
11	(Italy) M Cecchinato	0	7	6
(Germany) J-L Struff	6^{2}	4
(Bulgaria) G Dimitrov	7^{7}	6
(Spain) R Bautista Agut	1	1
2	(Spain) R Nadal	6	6

Third round
(Argentina) G Pella	6	4	6
11	(Italy) M Cecchinato	4	6	4
(Bulgaria) G Dimitrov	4	1
2	(Spain) R Nadal	6	6

Quarterfinals
(Argentina) G Pella	6^{1}	3
2	(Spain) R Nadal	7^{7}	6

== Qualifying ==
=== Seeds ===
1. (Argentina) Leonardo Mayer (first round)
2. (France) Ugo Humbert (qualifying competition)
3. (Japan) Yoshihito Nishioka (first round)
4. (Argentina) Juan Ignacio Londero (qualified)
5. (Slovenia) Aljaž Bedene (qualified)
6. (Germany) Mischa Zverev (first round)
7. (Argentina) Federico Delbonis (qualified)
8. (Japan) Taro Daniel (qualifying competition, lucky loser)
9. (Latvia) Ernests Gulbis (first round)
10. (Australia) Bernard Tomic (first round)
11. (Spain) Albert Ramos Viñolas (qualifying competition)
12. (Germany) Peter Gojowczyk (first round)
13. (Spain) Feliciano López (first round)
14. (Serbia) Miomir Kecmanović (first round)

=== Qualifiers ===
1. (Australia) Alexei Popyrin
2. (Russia) Andrey Rublev
3. (Italy) Lorenzo Sonego
4. (Argentina) Juan Ignacio Londero
5. (Slovenia) Aljaž Bedene
6. (Argentina) Guido Andreozzi
7. (Argentina) Federico Delbonis

=== Lucky loser ===
1. (Japan) Taro Daniel

=== Qualifying draw ===
==== First qualifier ====
First round
1	(Argentina) Leonardo Mayer	6^{5}	6	6^{2}
(Australia) Alexei Popyrin	7^{7}	2	7^{7}
(Sweden) Elias Ymer	6	6
14	(Serbia) Miomir Kecmanović	1	3

Qualifying competition
(Australia) Alexei Popyrin	6	7^{7}
(Sweden) Elias Ymer	3	6^{2}

==== Second qualifier ====
First round
2	(France) Ugo Humbert	3	7	6
WC	(France) Florent Diep	6	5	3
(Russia) Andrey Rublev	4	7^{7}	7^{8}
10	(Australia) Bernard Tomic	6	6^{5}	6^{6}

Qualifying competition
2	(France) Ugo Humbert	4	4
(Russia) Andrey Rublev	6	6

==== Third qualifier ====
First round
3	(Japan) Yoshihito Nishioka	2	6	0
(Italy) Lorenzo Sonego	6	4	6
(Argentina) Marco Trungelliti	6	6
12	(Germany) Peter Gojowczyk	4	2

Qualifying competition
(Italy) Lorenzo Sonego	w/o
(Argentina) Marco Trungelliti

==== Fourth qualifier ====
First round
4	(Argentina) Juan Ignacio Londero	6	6
WC	(Monaco) Romain Arneodo	0	4
(Italy) Thomas Fabbiano	3	6	6
13	(Spain) Feliciano López	6	4	2

Qualifying competition
4	(Argentina) Juan Ignacio Londero	6	6
(Italy) Thomas Fabbiano	4	1

==== Fifth qualifier ====
First round
5	(Slovenia) Aljaž Bedene	6	6
WC	(Monaco) Hugo Nys	2	4
(Germany) Yannick Maden	4	4
8	(Japan) Taro Daniel	6	6

Qualifying competition
5	(Slovenia) Aljaž Bedene	7^{7}	6
8	(Japan) Taro Daniel	6^{5}	3

==== Sixth qualifier ====
First round
6	(Germany) Mischa Zverev	6^{2}	6^{4}
WC	(Italy) Julian Ocleppo	7^{7}	7^{7}
(Argentina) Guido Andreozzi	6	6
9	(Latvia) Ernests Gulbis	4	1

Qualifying competition
WC	(Italy) Julian Ocleppo	3	1
(Argentina) Guido Andreozzi	6	6

==== Seventh qualifier ====
First round
7	(Argentina) Federico Delbonis	6	3
(Belarus) Ilya Ivashka	2	4^{r}
(Germany) Maximilian Marterer	2	2
11	(Spain) Albert Ramos Viñolas	6	6

Qualifying competition
7	(Argentina) Federico Delbonis	7	6
11	(Spain) Albert Ramos Viñolas	5	0
