= 2019 Monte-Carlo Masters =

- Date: 15 – 21 April
- Edition: 113th
- Category: Masters 1000
- Draw: 56S / 32D
- Prize money: €5,207,405
- Surface: Clay
- Location: Roquebrune-Cap-Martin, France (billed as Monte Carlo, Monaco)
- Venue: Monte Carlo Country Club

Champions

Singles
- (Italy) Fabio Fognini

Doubles
- (Croatia) Nikola Mektić / (Croatia) Franko Škugor
← 2018 ·	Monte-Carlo Masters	· 2021 →

The 2019 Monte-Carlo Masters (also known as the Rolex Monte-Carlo Masters for sponsorship reasons) was a tennis tournament for male professional players played on outdoor clay courts. It was the 113th edition of the annual Monte Carlo Masters tournament, sponsored by Rolex for the 11th time. It took place at the Monte Carlo Country Club in Roquebrune-Cap-Martin, France (though billed as Monte Carlo, Monaco). The event was on the 2019 ATP Tour.

== Points ==
Because the Monte Carlo Masters is the non-mandatory Masters 1000 event, special rules regarding points distribution are in place. The Monte Carlo Masters counts as one of a player's 500 level tournaments, while distributing Masters 1000 points.

Event	W	F	SF	QF	Round of 16	Round of 32	Round of 64	Q	Q2	Q1
Men's singles	1,000	600	360	180	90	45	10	25	16	0
Men's doubles	1,000	600	360	180	90	0	—	—	—	—

=== Prize money ===
Event	W	F	SF	QF	Round of 16	Round of 32	Round of 64	Q2	Q1
Men's singles	€958,055	€484,950	€248,745	€128,200	€64,225	€33,635	€18,955	€7,255	€3,630
Men's doubles	€284,860	€139,020	€69,680	€35,510	€18,730	€10,020	—	—	—

== Singles main draw entrants ==
=== Seeds ===
Country	Player	Rank^{1}	Seed
SRB	Novak Djokovic	1	1
ESP	Rafael Nadal	2	2
GER	Alexander Zverev	3	3
AUT	Dominic Thiem	5	4
JPN	Kei Nishikori	6	5
GRE	Stefanos Tsitsipas	8	6
CRO	Marin Čilić	11	7
RUS	Karen Khachanov	12	8
CRO	Borna Ćorić	13	9
RUS	Daniil Medvedev	14	10
ITA	Marco Cecchinato	16	11
GEO	Nikoloz Basilashvili	17	12
ITA	Fabio Fognini	18	13
~~FRA~~	~~Gaël Monfils~~	~~19~~	~~14~~
CAN	Denis Shapovalov	20	15
BEL	David Goffin	21	16
GBR	Kyle Edmund	22	17

- Rankings are as of April 8, 2019.

=== Other entrants ===
The following players received wildcards into the main draw:

- (Canada) Félix Auger-Aliassime
- (Monaco) Lucas Catarina
- (Australia) ~~Thanasi Kokkinakis~~
- (Spain) Jaume Munar

The following player received entry using a protected ranking into the singles main draw:

- (France) Jo-Wilfried Tsonga

The following player received entry as an alternate:

- (Tunisia) Malek Jaziri

The following players received entry via the qualifying draw:

- (Argentina) Guido Andreozzi
- (Slovenia) Aljaž Bedene
- (Argentina) Federico Delbonis
- (Argentina) Juan Ignacio Londero
- (Australia) Alexei Popyrin
- (Russia) Andrey Rublev
- (Italy) Lorenzo Sonego

The following player received entry as a lucky loser:

- (Japan) Taro Daniel

=== Withdrawals ===
Before the tournament

- (South Africa) Kevin Anderson → replaced by (France) Adrian Mannarino
- (Spain) Pablo Carreño Busta → replaced by (United States) Taylor Fritz
- (France) Richard Gasquet → replaced by (Poland) Hubert Hurkacz
- (Australia) Thanasi Kokkinakis → replaced by (Japan) Taro Daniel
- (France) Gaël Monfils → replaced by (Tunisia) Malek Jaziri

During the tournament

- (France) Gilles Simon

=== Retirements ===
- (Bosnia and Herzegovina) Damir Džumhur
- (France) Jo-Wilfried Tsonga

== Doubles main draw entrants ==
=== Seeds ===
Country	Player	Country	Player	Rank^{1}	Seed
FRA	Pierre-Hugues Herbert	FRA	Nicolas Mahut	8	1
POL	Łukasz Kubot	BRA	Marcelo Melo	10	2
GBR	Jamie Murray	BRA	Bruno Soares	17	3
COL	Juan Sebastián Cabal	COL	Robert Farah	22	4
AUT	Oliver Marach	CRO	Mate Pavić	23	5
FIN	Henri Kontinen	AUS	John Peers	33	6
CRO	Nikola Mektić	CRO	Franko Škugor	34	7
RSA	Raven Klaasen	GBR	Joe Salisbury	35	8

- Rankings are as of April 8, 2019.

=== Other entrants ===
The following pairs received wildcards into the doubles main draw:

- (Monaco) Romain Arneodo / (Monaco) Hugo Nys
- (Serbia) Marko Djokovic / (Serbia) Novak Djokovic
- (Austria) Jürgen Melzer / (Austria) Dominic Thiem

The following pair received entry as alternate:

- (Germany) Philipp Kohlschreiber / (Spain) Fernando Verdasco

=== Withdrawals ===
- (Canada) Félix Auger-Aliassime

== Champions ==
=== Singles ===
- (Italy) Fabio Fognini def. (Serbia) Dušan Lajović, 6−3, 6−4

=== Doubles ===
- (Croatia) Nikola Mektić / (Croatia) Franko Škugor def. (Netherlands) Robin Haase / (Netherlands) Wesley Koolhof, 6–7^{(3–7)}, 7–6^{(7–3)}, [11–9]
