= Taylor Fritz career statistics =

Career finals
Discipline	Type	Won	Lost	Total
Singles	Grand Slam	0	1	1
Singles	ATP Finals	0	1	1
Singles	ATP 1000	1	0	1
Singles	ATP 500	2	4	6
Singles	ATP 250	9	7	16
Singles	Olympics	–	–	–
Singles	Total	12	13	25
Doubles	Grand Slam	–	–	–
Doubles	ATP Finals	–	–	–
Doubles	ATP 1000	–	–	–
Doubles	ATP 500	0	3	3
Doubles	ATP 250	0	1	1
Doubles	Olympics	–	–	–
Doubles	Total	0	4	4

This is a list of main career statistics of American professional tennis player Taylor Fritz. All statistics are according to the ATP Tour and ITF website.

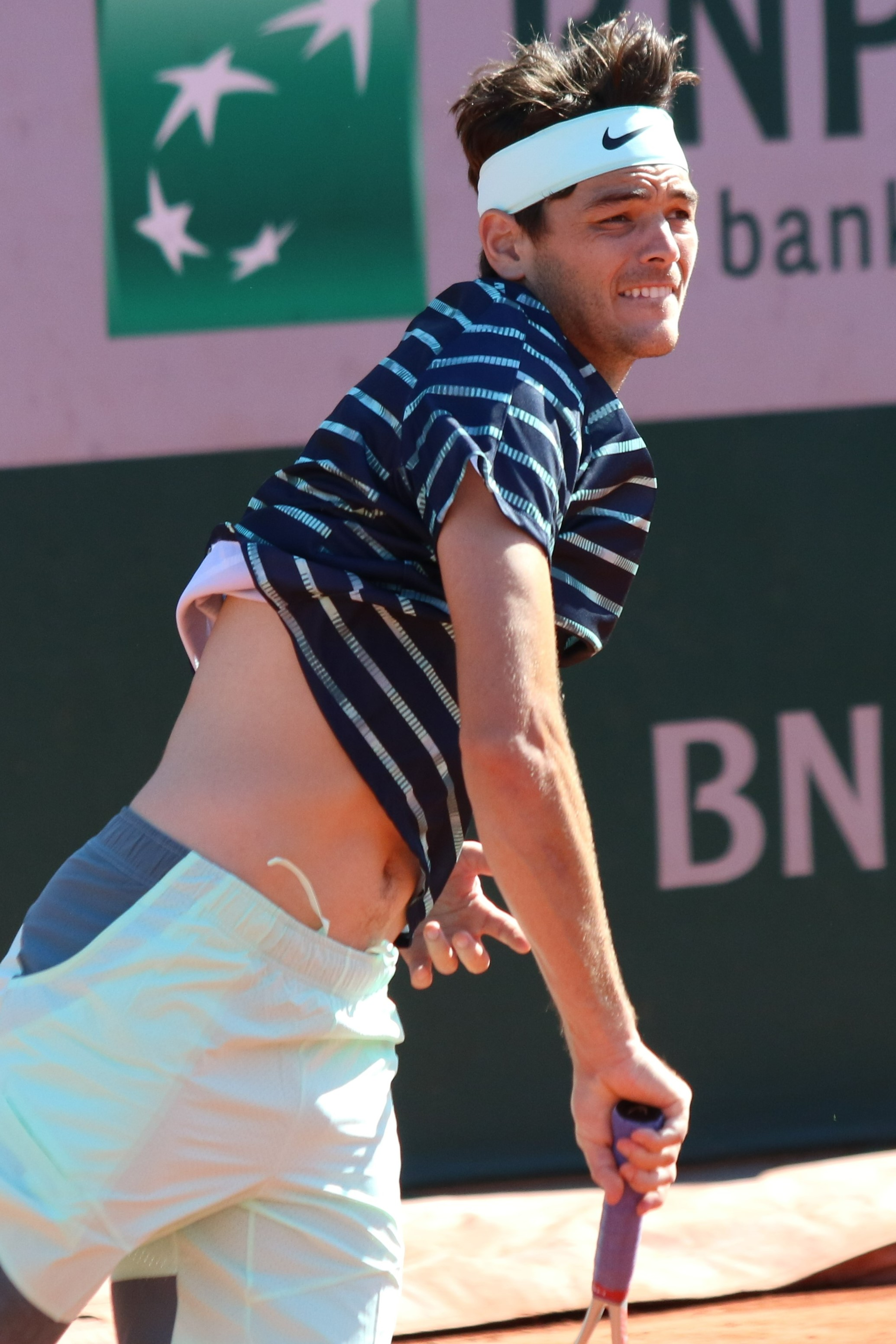
Fritz at the 2022 French Open

== Singles performance timeline ==
Key
W	F	SF	QF	#R	RR	Q#	P#	DNQ	A	Z#	PO	G	S	B	NMS	NTI	P	NH

(W) winner; (F) finalist; (SF) semifinalist; (QF) quarterfinalist; (#R) rounds 4, 3, 2, 1; (RR) round-robin stage; (Q#) qualification round; (P#) preliminary round; (DNQ) did not qualify; (A) absent; (Z#) Davis/Fed Cup Zonal Group (with number indication) or (PO) play-off; (G) gold, (S) silver or (B) bronze Olympic/Paralympic medal; (NMS) not a Masters tournament; (NTI) not a Tier I tournament; (P) postponed; (NH) not held; (SR) strike rate (events won / competed); (W–L) win–loss record.
To avoid confusion and double counting, these charts are updated at the conclusion of a tournament or when the player's participation has ended.

Current through the 2026 ATP Finals.

Tournament	2014	2015	2016	2017	2018	2019	2020	2021	2022	2023	2024	2025	2026	SR	W–L	Win%
Grand Slam tournaments
Australian Open	A	A	1R	1R	Q2	3R	3R	3R	4R	2R	QF	3R	4R	0 / 10	19–10	66%
French Open	A	A	1R	A	1R	2R	3R	2R	2R	3R	4R	1R	1R	0 / 10	10–10	50%
Wimbledon	A	A	1R	1R	2R	2R	NH	3R	QF	2R	QF	SF	QF	0 / 10	22–10	69%
US Open	Q1	Q1	1R	2R	3R	1R	3R	2R	1R	QF	F	QF	3R	0 / 11	22–11	67%
Win–loss	0–0	0–0	0–4	1–3	3–3	4–4	6–3	6–4	8–4	8–4	17–4	11–4	9–4	0 / 41	73–41	64%
Year-end championships
ATP Finals	did not qualify								SF	Alt	F	RR	DNQ	0 / 3	6–6	50%
National representation
Summer Olympics	NH		A	NH				A	NH		3R	NH		0 / 1	2–1	67%
Davis Cup	A	A	A	A	A	RR	RR (Note: Edition is split into two years due to COVID-19.)		QF	A	QF	2R	A	0 / 5	8–4	67%
ATP 1000 tournaments
Indian Wells Open	A	Q2	1R	3R	4R	1R	NH	SF	W	QF	4R	4R	3R	1 / 10	23–9	72%
Miami Open	A	A	2R	2R	1R	1R	NH	4R	4R	QF	2R	SF	4R	0 / 10	15–10	60%
Monte-Carlo Masters	A	A	A	A	A	3R	NH	1R	QF	SF	1R	A	A	0 / 5	8–5	62%
Madrid Open	A	A	Q1	A	Q2	2R	NH	1R	A	4R	SF	4R	A	0 / 5	9–5	64%
Italian Open	A	A	Q1	A	Q1	2R	1R	2R	A	2R	QF	2R	A	0 / 6	5–6	45%
Canadian Open	A	A	1R	A	A	1R	NH	1R	3R	3R	2R	SF	2R	0 / 8	8–8	50%
Cincinnati Open	A	A	1R	A	A	1R	2R	1R	QF	QF	1R	4R	QF	0 / 9	12–9	57%
Shanghai Masters	A	A	2R	Q1	2R	2R	NH			3R	SF	3R	3R	0 / 6	9–6	60%
Paris Masters	A	A	Q1	A	A	2R	1R	QF	2R	2R	2R	3R	QF	0 / 7	7–6	54%
Win–loss	0–0	0–0	2–5	3–2	4–3	6–9	1–3	10–8	17–5	17–8	14–9	16–8	6–4	1 / 66	96–64	60%
Career statistics
	2014	2015	2016	2017	2018	2019	2020	2021	2022	2023	2024	2025	2026	Career		
Tournaments	0	1	22	13	18	29	13	22	21	25	22	22	20	Career total: 228		
Titles	0	0	0	0	0	1	0	0	3	2	2	2	2	Career total: 12		
Finals	0	0	1	0	0	3	1	1	3	2	5	3	6	Career total: 25		
Overall win–loss	0–0	1–1	15–22	13–13	23–20	31–30	14–15	34–22	46–21	54–23	53–23	53–23	46–22	12 / 228	383–235	62%
Win %	–	50%	41%	50%	53%	51%	48%	61%	69%	70%	70%	70%	68%	Career total: 62%		
Year-end ranking	1151	174	76	104	50	32	29	23	9	10	4	6		$34,296,674		

== Grand Slam tournaments finals ==
=== Singles: 1 (runner-up) ===
Result	Year	Tournament	Surface	Opponent	Score
Loss	2024	US Open	Hard	(Italy) Jannik Sinner	3–6, 4–6, 5–7

== Other significant finals ==
=== Year-end championships (ATP Finals) ===
==== Singles: 1 (runner-up) ====
Result	Year	Tournament	Surface	Opponent	Score
Loss	2024	ATP Finals, Italy	Hard (i)	(Italy) Jannik Sinner	4–6, 4–6

=== ATP 1000 tournaments ===
==== Singles: 1 (title) ====
Result	Year	Tournament	Surface	Opponent	Score
Win	2022	Indian Wells Open	Hard	(Spain) Rafael Nadal	6–3, 7–6^{(7–5)}

=== Summer Olympics ===
==== Doubles: 1 (bronze medal) ====
Result	Year	Tournament	Surface	Partner	Opponents	Score
Bronze	2024	Paris Olympics	Clay	(United States) Tommy Paul	(Czech Republic) Tomáš Macháč (Czech Republic) Adam Pavlásek	6–3, 6–4

== ATP Tour finals ==
=== Singles: 25 (12 titles, 13 runner-ups) ===
Legend Grand Slam (0–1) ATP Finals (0–1) ATP 1000 (1–0) ATP 500 (2–4) ATP 250 (9–7)	Finals by surface Hard (7–10) Clay (0–1) Grass (5–2)	Finals by setting Outdoor (11–8) Indoor (1–5)

Result	W–L	Date	Tournament	Tier	Surface	Opponent	Score
Loss	0–1	Feb 2016	Memphis Open, US	ATP 250	Hard (i)	(Japan) Kei Nishikori	4–6, 4–6
Win	1–1	Jun 2019	Eastbourne International, UK	ATP 250	Grass	(United States) Sam Querrey	6–3, 6–4
Loss	1–2	Jul 2019	Atlanta Open, US	ATP 250	Hard	(Australia) Alex de Minaur	3–6, 6–7^{(2–7)}
Loss	1–3	Aug 2019	Los Cabos Open, Mexico	ATP 250	Hard	(Argentina) Diego Schwartzman	6–7^{(6–8)}, 3–6
Loss	1–4	Feb 2020	Mexican Open, Mexico	ATP 500	Hard	(Spain) Rafael Nadal	3–6, 2–6
Loss	1–5	Oct 2021	St. Petersburg Open, Russia	ATP 250	Hard (i)	(Croatia) Marin Čilić	6–7^{(3–7)}, 6–4, 4–6
Win	2–5	Mar 2022	Indian Wells Open, US	ATP 1000	Hard	(Spain) Rafael Nadal	6–3, 7–6^{(7–5)}
Win	3–5	Jun 2022	Eastbourne International, UK (2)	ATP 250	Grass	(United States) Maxime Cressy	6–2, 6–7^{(4–7)}, 7–6^{(7–4)}
Win	4–5	Oct 2022	Japan Open, Japan	ATP 500	Hard	(United States) Frances Tiafoe	7–6^{(7–3)}, 7–6^{(7–2)}
Win	5–5	Feb 2023	Delray Beach Open, US	ATP 250	Hard	(Serbia) Miomir Kecmanović	6–0, 5–7, 6–2
Win	6–5	Jul 2023	Atlanta Open, US	ATP 250	Hard	(Australia) Aleksandar Vukic	7–5, 6–7^{(5–7)}, 6–4
Win	7–5	Feb 2024	Delray Beach Open, US (2)	ATP 250	Hard	(United States) Tommy Paul	6–2, 6–3
Loss	7–6	Apr 2024	Bavarian Open, Germany	ATP 250	Clay	(Germany) Jan-Lennard Struff	5–7, 3–6
Win	8–6	Jun 2024	Eastbourne International, UK (3)	ATP 250	Grass	(Australia) Max Purcell	6–4, 6–3
Loss	8–7	Aug 2024	US Open, US	Grand Slam	Hard	(Italy) Jannik Sinner	3–6, 4–6, 5–7
Loss	8–8	Nov 2024	ATP Finals, Italy	Finals	Hard (i)	(Italy) Jannik Sinner	4–6, 4–6
Win	9–8	Jun 2025	Stuttgart Open, Germany	ATP 250	Grass	(Germany) Alexander Zverev	6–3, 7–6^{(7–0)}
Win	10–8	Jun 2025	Eastbourne International, UK (4)	ATP 250	Grass	(United States) Jenson Brooksby	7–5, 6–1
Loss	10–9	Sep 2025	Japan Open, Japan	ATP 500	Hard	(Spain) Carlos Alcaraz	4–6, 4–6
Loss	10–10	Feb 2026	Dallas Open, US	ATP 500	Hard (i)	(United States) Ben Shelton	6–3, 3–6, 5–7
Loss	10–11	Jun 2026	Stuttgart Open, Germany	ATP 250	Grass	(United States) Ben Shelton	4–6, 6–2, 4–6
Loss	10–12	Jun 2026	Halle Open, Germany	ATP 500	Grass	(United States) Frances Tiafoe	4–6, 4–6
Win	11–12	Jul 2026	Washington Open, US	ATP 500	Hard	(Spain) Rafael Jódar	7–6^{(7–2)}, 6–4
Loss	11–13	Oct 2026	Lyon Open, France	ATP 250	Hard (i)	(Italy) Lorenzo Musetti	3–6, 4–6
Win	12–13	Nov 2026	Stockholm Open, Sweden	ATP 250	Hard (i)	(Argentina) Thiago Agustín Tirante	6–2, 4–6, 7–6^{(7–3)}

=== Doubles: 4 (4 runner-ups) ===
Legend Grand Slam (–) ATP 1000 (–) ATP 500 (0–3) ATP 250 (0–1)	Finals by surface Hard (0–2) Clay (–) Grass (0–2)	Finals by setting Outdoor (0–3) Indoor (0–1)

Result	W–L	Date	Tournament	Tier	Surface	Partner	Opponents	Score
Loss	0–1	Aug 2018	Los Cabos Open, Mexico	ATP 250	Hard	(Australia) Thanasi Kokkinakis	(El Salvador) Marcelo Arévalo (Mexico) Miguel Ángel Reyes-Varela	4–6, 4–6
Loss	0–2	Oct 2019	Swiss Indoors, Switzerland	ATP 500	Hard (i)	(United States) Reilly Opelka	(Netherlands) Jean-Julien Rojer (Romania) Horia Tecău	5–7, 3–6
Loss	0–3	Jun 2023	Queen's Club Championships, UK	ATP 500	Grass	(Czech Republic) Jiří Lehečka	(Croatia) Ivan Dodig (United States) Austin Krajicek	4–6, 7–6^{(7–5)}, [3–10]
Loss	0–4	Jun 2024	Queen's Club Championships, UK	ATP 500	Grass	Karen Khachanov	(United Kingdom) Neal Skupski (New Zealand) Michael Venus	6–4, 6–7^{(5–7)}, [8–10]

== National and international representation ==
=== Team competitions finals: 7 (5 titles, 2 runner-ups) ===
Finals by tournaments Davis Cup (–) United Cup (2–0) Laver Cup (3–2)	Finals by teams United States (2–0) World (3–2)

Result	Date	W–L	Tournament	Surface	Team	Partners	Opponent team	Opponent players	Score
Loss	Sep 2019	0–1	Laver Cup, Geneva, Switzerland	Hard (i)	Team World	John Isner; Milos Raonic; Nick Kyrgios; Denis Shapovalov; Jack Sock	Team Europe	Rafael Nadal; Roger Federer; Dominic Thiem; Alexander Zverev; Stefanos Tsitsipas; Fabio Fognini	11–13
Win	Sep 2022	1–1	Laver Cup, London, United Kingdom	Hard (i)	Team World	Félix Auger-Aliassime; Diego Schwartzman; Frances Tiafoe; Alex de Minaur; Jack Sock	Team Europe	Casper Ruud; Rafael Nadal; Stefanos Tsitsipas; Novak Djokovic; Andy Murray; Roger Federer; Matteo Berrettini; Cameron Norrie	13–8
Win	Jan 2023	2–1	United Cup, Sydney, Australia	Hard (i)	United States	Frances Tiafoe; Jessica Pegula; Madison Keys	Italy	Matteo Berrettini; Martina Trevisan; Lorenzo Musetti; Lucia Bronzetti	4–0
Win	Sep 2023	3–1	Laver Cup, Vancouver, Canada	Hard (i)	Team World	Frances Tiafoe; Tommy Paul; Félix Auger-Aliassime; Ben Shelton; Francisco Cerúndolo	Team Europe	Andrey Rublev; Casper Ruud; Hubert Hurkacz; Alejandro Davidovich Fokina; Arthur Fils; Gaël Monfils	13–2
Loss	Sep 2024	3–2	Laver Cup, Berlin, Germany	Hard (i)	Team World	Frances Tiafoe; Ben Shelton; Alejandro Tabilo; Francisco Cerúndolo; Thanasi Kokkinakis	Team Europe	Alexander Zverev; Carlos Alcaraz; Daniil Medvedev; Casper Ruud; Stefanos Tsitsipas; Grigor Dimitrov	11–13
Win	Jan 2025	4–2	United Cup, Sydney, Australia	Hard	United States	Denis Kudla; Coco Gauff; Danielle Collins	Poland	Hubert Hurkacz; Iga Świątek; Kamil Majchrzak; Maja Chwalińska	2–0
Win	Sep 2025	5–2	Laver Cup, San Francisco, United States	Hard (i)	Team World	Alex de Minaur; Francisco Cerúndolo; Alex Michelsen; João Fonseca; Reilly Opelka	Team Europe	Carlos Alcaraz; Alexander Zverev; Holger Rune; Casper Ruud; Jakub Menšík; Flavio Cobolli	15–9

== ATP Challenger Tour finals ==
=== Singles: 8 (5 titles, 3 runner-ups) ===
Legend ATP Challenger Tour (5–3)	Finals by surface Hard (5–3) Clay (–)

Result	W–L	Date	Tournament	Tier	Surface	Opponent	Score
Win	1–0	Oct 2015	Natomas Open, US	Challenger	Hard	(United States) Jared Donaldson	6–4, 3–6, 6–4
Win	2–0	Oct 2015	Fairfield Challenger, US	Challenger	Hard	(Germany) Dustin Brown	6–3, 6–4
Loss	2–1	Nov 2015	Champaign-Urbana Challenger, US	Challenger	Hard (i)	(Switzerland) Henri Laaksonen	6–4, 2–6, 2–6
Win	3–1	Jan 2016	Onkaparinga Challenger, Australia	Challenger	Hard	(Israel) Dudi Sela	7–6^{(9–7)}, 6–2
Loss	3–2	Feb 2017	Dallas Championships, US	Challenger	Hard (i)	(United States) Ryan Harrison	3–6, 3–6
Loss	3–3	Jan 2018	Nouvelle-Calédonie Open, France	Challenger	Hard	(United States) Noah Rubin	5–7, 4–6
Win	4–3	Jan 2018	Newport Beach Challenger, US	Challenger	Hard	(United States) Bradley Klahn	3–6, 7–5, 6–0
Win	5–3	Jan 2019	Newport Beach Challenger, US (2)	Challenger	Hard	(Canada) Brayden Schnur	7–6^{(9–7)}, 6–4

== ITF Futures finals ==
=== Doubles: 1 (runner-up) ===
Legend ITF Futures (0–1)

Result	W–L	Date	Tournament	Tier	Surface	Partner	Opponents	Score
Loss	0–1	Feb 2014	F4 Palm Coast, US	Futures	Clay	(United States) Martin Redlicki	(Sweden) Markus Eriksson (Sweden) Milos Sekulic	1–6, 1–6

== Junior Grand Slam finals ==
=== Singles: 2 (1 title, 1 runner-up) ===
Result	Year	Tournament	Surface	Opponent	Score
Loss	2015	French Open	Clay	(United States) Tommy Paul	6–7^{(4–7)}, 6–2, 2–6
Win	2015	US Open	Hard	(United States) Tommy Paul	6–2, 6–7^{(4–7)}, 6–2

== Exhibition matches ==
=== Singles ===
Result	Date	Tournament	Surface	Opponent	Score
Loss	May 2021	Ultimate Tennis Showdown, Sophia Antipolis, France	Clay	(France) Corentin Moutet	14–12, 11–15, 12–13, 8–16
Loss	Jul 2023	Ultimate Tennis Showdown, Los Angeles, US	Hard	(China) Wu Yibing	16–11, 20–7, 11–12, 9–16, 0–2
Win	Oct 2025	6 Kings Slam, Riyadh, Saudi Arabia	Hard (i)	(Germany) Alexander Zverev	6–3, 6–4
Loss	Oct 2025	6 Kings Slam, Riyadh, Saudi Arabia	Hard (i)	(Spain) Carlos Alcaraz	4–6, 2–6
Win	Oct 2025	6 Kings Slam, Riyadh, Saudi Arabia	Hard (i)	(Serbia) Novak Djokovic	7–6^{(7–4)}, ret.
Loss	Dec 2025	Charlotte Invitational, Charlotte, US	Hard (i)	(United States) Frances Tiafoe	6–4, 4–6, [8–10]

== Career Grand Slam tournament statistics ==
=== Career Grand Slam tournament seedings ===
Year	Australian Open	French Open	Wimbledon	US Open
2014	did not play	did not play	did not play	did not qualify
2015	did not play	did not play	did not play	did not qualify
2016	qualifier	not seeded	not seeded	not seeded
2017	not seeded	did not play	qualifier	wild card
2018	did not qualify	not seeded	not seeded	not seeded
2019	not seeded	not seeded	not seeded	26th
2020	29th	27th	tournament cancelled*	19th
2021	27th	30th	31st	not seeded
2022	20th	13th	11th	10th
2023	8th	9th	9th	9th
2024	12th	12th	13th	12th (1)
2025	4th	4th	5th	4th
2026	9th	7th	6th	9th

* Due to the COVID-19 pandemic, the 2020 Wimbledon Championships of the tournament was cancelled.

=== Best Grand Slam results details ===
Australian Open
2024 Australian Open (12th seed)
Round	Opponent	Rank	Score
1R	(Argentina) Facundo Díaz Acosta	90	4–6, 6–3, 3–6, 6–2, 6–4
2R	(France) Hugo Gaston (LL)	97	6–0, 6–3, 6–1
3R	(Hungary) Fábián Marozsán	67	3–6, 6–4, 6–2, 6–2
4R	(Greece) Stefanos Tsitsipas (7)	7	7–6^{(7–3)}, 5–7, 6–3, 6–3
QF	(Serbia) Novak Djokovic (1)	1	6–7^{(3–7)}, 6–4, 2–6, 3–6

French Open
2024 French Open (12th seed)
Round	Opponent	Rank	Score
1R	(Argentina) Federico Coria	71	2–6, 6–1, 6–2, 6–1
2R	(Serbia) Dušan Lajović	61	6–3, 3–6, 6–3, 6–4
3R	(Australia) Thanasi Kokkinakis	100	6–3, 6–2, 6–7^{(4–7)}, 5–7, 6–3
4R	(Norway) Casper Ruud (7)	7	6–7^{(4–7)}, 6–3, 4–6, 2–6

Wimbledon Championships
2025 Wimbledon (5th seed)
Round	Opponent	Rank	Score
1R	(France) Giovanni Mpetshi Perricard	36	6–7^{(6–8)}, 6–7^{(8–10)}, 6–4, 7–6^{(8–6)}, 6–4
2R	(Canada) Gabriel Diallo	40	3–6, 6–3, 7–6^{(7–0)}, 4–6, 6–3
3R	(Spain) Alejandro Davidovich Fokina (26)	27	6–4, 6–3, 6–7^{(5–7)}, 6–1
4R	(Australia) Jordan Thompson	44	6–1, 3–0 ret.
QF	Karen Khachanov (17)	20	6–3, 6–4, 1–6, 7–6^{(7–4)}
SF	(Spain) Carlos Alcaraz (2)	2	4–6, 7–5, 3–6, 6–7^{(6–8)}

US Open
2024 US Open (12th seed)
Round	Opponent	Rank	Score
1R	(Argentina) Camilo Ugo Carabelli	93	7–5, 6–1, 6–2
2R	(Italy) Matteo Berrettini	44	6–3, 7–6^{(7–1)}, 6–1
3R	(Argentina) Francisco Comesaña	108	6–3, 6–4, 6–2
4R	(Norway) Casper Ruud (8)	8	3–6, 6–4, 6–3, 6–2
QF	(Germany) Alexander Zverev (4)	4	7–6^{(7–2)}, 3–6, 6–4, 7–6^{(7–3)}
SF	(United States) Frances Tiafoe (20)	20	4–6, 7–5, 4–6, 6–4, 6–1
F	(Italy) Jannik Sinner (1)	1	3–6, 4–6, 5–7

== Wins over top 10 players ==
- Fritz has a 38–55 (40.86%) record against players who were, at the time the match was played, ranked in the top 10.

Season	2017	2018	2019	2020	2021	2022	2023	2024	2025	2026	Total
Wins	1	0	5	0	3	6	4	11	4	4	38

#	Opponent	Rk	Event	Surface	Rd	Score	Rk	Ref
2017
1.	(Croatia) Marin Čilić	7	Indian Wells Open, United States	Hard	2R	4–6, 7–5, 6–4	136	
2019
2.	(United States) John Isner	10	Auckland Open, New Zealand	Hard	2R	7–6^{(7–3)}, 7–6^{(7–5)}	50	
3.	(Italy) Fabio Fognini	9	Los Cabos Open, Mexico	Hard	QF	6–1, 7–6^{(7–1)}	28	
4.	(Austria) Dominic Thiem	5	Laver Cup, Switzerland	Hard (i)	RR	7–5, 6–7^{(3–7)}, [10–5]	30	
5.	(Germany) Alexander Zverev	6	Swiss Indoors, Switzerland	Hard (i)	1R	7–6^{(9–7)}, 6–4	31	
6.	(Italy) Matteo Berrettini	8	Davis Cup, Spain	Hard (i)	RR	5–7, 7–6^{(7–5)}, 6–2	32	
2021
7.	(Italy) Matteo Berrettini	7	Indian Wells Open, United States	Hard	3R	6–4, 6–3	39	
8.	(Germany) Alexander Zverev	4	Indian Wells Open, United States	Hard	QF	4–6, 6–3, 7–6^{(7–3)}	39	
9.	(Russia) Andrey Rublev	6	Paris Masters, France	Hard (i)	2R	7–5, 7–6^{(7–2)}	26	
2022
10.	Andrey Rublev	7	Indian Wells Open, United States	Hard	SF	7–5, 6–4	20	
11.	(Spain) Rafael Nadal	4	Indian Wells Open, United States	Hard	F	6–3, 7–6^{(7–5)}	20	
12.	Andrey Rublev	8	Cincinnati Open, United States	Hard	3R	6–7^{(4–7)}, 6–2, 7–5	13	
13.	(United Kingdom) Cameron Norrie	8	Laver Cup, United Kingdom	Hard (i)	RR	6–1, 4–6, [10–8]	12	
14.	(Spain) Rafael Nadal	2	ATP Finals, Italy	Hard (i)	RR	7–6^{(7–3)}, 6–1	9	
15.	(Canada) Félix Auger-Aliassime	6	ATP Finals, Italy	Hard (i)	RR	7–6^{(7–4)}, 6–7^{(5–7)}, 6–2	9	
2023
16.	(Poland) Hubert Hurkacz	10	United Cup, Australia	Hard	SF	7–6^{(7–5)}, 7–6^{(7–5)}	9	
17.	(Denmark) Holger Rune	8	Miami Open, United States	Hard	4R	6–3, 6–4	10	
18.	(Greece) Stefanos Tsitsipas	3	Monte-Carlo Masters, France	Clay	QF	6–2, 6–4	10	
19.	Andrey Rublev	6	Laver Cup, Canada	Hard (i)	RR	6–2, 7–6^{(7–3)}	8	
2024
20.	(Greece) Stefanos Tsitsipas	7	Australian Open, Australia	Hard	4R	7–6^{(7–3)}, 5–7, 6–3, 6–3	12	
21.	(Poland) Hubert Hurkacz	9	Madrid Open, Spain	Clay	4R	7–6^{(7–2)}, 6–4	13	
22.	(Bulgaria) Grigor Dimitrov	10	Italian Open, Italy	Clay	4R	6–2, 6–7^{(11–13)}, 6–1	13	
23.	(Germany) Alexander Zverev	4	Wimbledon, United Kingdom	Grass	4R	4–6, 6–7^{(4–7)}, 6–4, 7–6^{(7–3)}, 6–3	12	
24.	(Norway) Casper Ruud	8	US Open, United States	Hard	4R	3–6, 6–4, 6–3, 6–2	12	
25.	(Germany) Alexander Zverev	4	US Open, United States	Hard	QF	7–6^{(7–2)}, 3–6, 6–4, 7–6^{(7–3)}	12	
26.	(Germany) Alexander Zverev	2	Laver Cup, Germany	Hard (i)	RR	6–4, 7–5	7	
27.	Daniil Medvedev	4	ATP Finals, Italy	Hard (i)	RR	6–4, 6–3	6	
28.	(Australia) Alex de Minaur	9	ATP Finals, Italy	Hard (i)	RR	5–7, 6–4, 6–3	5	
29.	(Germany) Alexander Zverev	2	ATP Finals, Italy	Hard (i)	SF	6–3, 3–6, 7–6^{(7–3)}	5	
30.	(Australia) Alex de Minaur	9	Davis Cup, Spain	Hard (i)	QF	6–3, 6–4	4	
2025
31.	(Germany) Alexander Zverev	3	Stuttgart Open, Germany	Grass	F	6–3, 7–6^{(7–0)}	7	
32.	(Spain) Carlos Alcaraz	1	Laver Cup, United States	Hard (i)	RR	6–3, 6–2	5	
33.	(Germany) Alexander Zverev	3	Laver Cup, United States	Hard (i)	RR	6–3, 7–6^{(7–4)}	5	
34.	(Italy) Lorenzo Musetti	9	ATP Finals, Italy	Hard (i)	RR	6–3, 6–4	6	
2026
35.	(United States) Ben Shelton	5	Halle Open, Germany	Grass	QF	6–7^{(5–7)}, 7–6^{(10–8)}, 7–6^{(7–3)}	9	
36.	(Germany) Alexander Zverev	3	Halle Open, Germany	Grass	SF	6–7^{(4–7)}, 6–4, 7–5	9	
37.	(France) Arthur Fils	8	Swiss Indoors, Switzerland	Hard (i)	QF	6–2, 2–0 (ret)	13	
38.	(France) Arthur Fils	7	Paris Masters, France	Hard (i)	3R	6–3, 6–4	12	

- Key: (Rk) first use, opponent rank; (Rd) round; (Rk) 2nd use, player rank; (Ref) reference; (F) final; (SF) semifinal; (QF) quarterfinal; (#R) rounds 4, 3, 2, 1; (RR) round-robin stage; (Q#) qualifying rounds or stages (3), 2, 1.

* As of 9 November 2026

== ATP Tour career earnings ==
Year	Majors	ATP wins	Total wins	Earnings ($)	Money list rank
2014	0	0	0	$6,719	n/a
2015	0	0	0	$55,865	n/a
2016	0	0	0	$508,033	87
2017	0	0	0	$398,062	115
2018	0	0	0	$870,034	69
2019	0	1	1	$1,261,702	42
2020	0	0	0	$945,890	24
2021	0	0	0	$1,431,820	18
2022	0	3	3	$4,570,481	8
2023	0	2	2	$4,019,217	10
2024	0	2	2	$8,250,064	4
2025	0	2	2	$5,938,539	6
2026	0	1	1	$3,702,303	11
Career	0	12	12	$34,174,073	14

* Statistics correct as of 9 November 2026.

== Longest winning streaks ==
=== 9-match winning streak (2025) ===
#	Tournament	Tier	Start date	Surface	Round	Opponent	Rank	Score	Rank
–	Queen's Club Championships, UK	ATP 500	16 June 2025	Grass	1R	(France) Corentin Moutet (Q)	89	7–6^{(7–5)}, 6–7^{(7–9)}, 5–7	4
1	Eastbourne International, UK	ATP 250	23 June 2025	Grass	2R	(Brazil) João Fonseca	57	6–3, 6–7^{(5–7)}, 7–5	5
2	Eastbourne International, UK	ATP 250	23 June 2025	Grass	QF	(United States) Marcos Giron	46	7–5, 4–6, 7–5	5
3	Eastbourne International, UK	ATP 250	23 June 2025	Grass	SF	(Spain) Alejandro Davidovich Fokina (6)	28	6–3, 3–6, 6–1	5
4	Eastbourne International, UK	ATP 250	23 June 2025	Grass	F	(United States) Jenson Brooksby (LL)	149	7–5, 6–1	5
5	Wimbledon, UK	Grand Slam	30 June 2025	Grass	1R	(France) Giovanni Mpetshi Perricard	36	6–7^{(6–8)}, 6–7^{(8–10)}, 6–4, 7–6^{(8–6)}, 6–4	5
6	Wimbledon, UK	Grand Slam	30 June 2025	Grass	2R	(Canada) Gabriel Diallo	40	3–6, 6–3, 7–6^{(7–0)}, 4–6, 6–3	5
7	Wimbledon, UK	Grand Slam	30 June 2025	Grass	3R	(Spain) Alejandro Davidovich Fokina (26)	27	6–4, 6–3, 6–7^{(5–7)}, 6–1	5
8	Wimbledon, UK	Grand Slam	30 June 2025	Grass	4R	(Australia) Jordan Thompson	44	6–1, 3–0 ret.	5
9	Wimbledon, UK	Grand Slam	30 June 2025	Grass	QF	Karen Khachanov (17)	20	6–3, 6–4, 1–6, 7–6^{(7–4)}	5
–	Wimbledon, UK	Grand Slam	30 June 2025	Grass	SF	(Spain) Carlos Alcaraz (2)	2	4–6, 7–5, 3–6, 6–7^{(6–8)}	5

== See also ==
- United States Davis Cup team
- List of United States Davis Cup team representatives
- Junior tennis
