= 2019 Roger Federer tennis season =

Statistics for Swiss tennis player

- Full name: Roger Federer
- Country: Switzerland
- Calendar prize money: $8,716,975

Singles
- Season record: 53–10
- Calendar titles: 4
- Year-end ranking: No. 3
- Ranking change from previous year: Steady

Grand Slam & significant results
- Australian Open: 4R
- French Open: SF
- Wimbledon: F
- US Open: QF
- Other tournaments
- Tour Finals: SF

Doubles
- Season record: 1–1
- Year-end ranking: Unranked

Mixed doubles
- Season record: 3–1

Roger Federer's 2019 tennis season officially began on 30 December 2018, with the start of the Hopman Cup. His season ended on 16 November 2019, with a loss in the semifinals of the ATP Finals. Despite failing to defend his title at the Australian Open, Federer was able to maintain his ranking of World No. 3 by the end of the year.

In this season, Federer won his 28th and final Masters 1000 title in Miami and his final career title in Basel. He ended his professional rivalry with Rafael Nadal in the semifinals of Wimbledon and contested his 31st and last major final of his career, losing to Novak Djokovic. Finally, Federer made his final appearance in a Masters 1000 tournament in Shanghai as well as his final US Open and ATP Finals appearances.

== Year summary ==
=== Early hard court season ===
==== Hopman Cup ====
As in the past two seasons, Roger Federer paired with Belinda Bencic at the Hopman Cup, representing Switzerland. Federer defeated Cameron Norrie from Great Britain, Frances Tiafoe from the United States and Stefanos Tsitsipas from Greece, all in straight sets, to help Switzerland advance to the final. The tie against the United States was remarkable for staging the first-ever meeting between Federer and Serena Williams, considered one of the best female tennis players of all time, in a mixed doubles match alongside Bencic and Tiafoe.

With Federer defeating Alexander Zverev in straight sets, and like in the previous year, they defeated Germany 2–1 in the final to clinch Federer's third and Switzerland's fourth Hopman Cup title overall. The mixed doubles title match was decided in the final point, with Bencic forcing an error from Zverev to help Switzerland win the match and the tournament.

==== Australian Open ====
As the two-time defending champion, Federer entered the first Grand Slam tournament of the season, the Australian Open, as the No. 3 seed. His first match was a straight-sets victory over Denis Istomin, followed by another one against Daniel Evans. In the third round he defeated Taylor Fritz, again in straight sets, but was upset by Stefanos Tsitsipas in the fourth round, losing in four tight sets.

Being the defending champion and as a result of losing in the fourth round, he dropped out of the Top 5 in the ATP rankings. In a post-tournament interview, he admitted that he planned to play the clay court season in 2019, after two years of skipping it.

==== Dubai Tennis Championships ====
After skipping the tournament in 2018, Federer returned to Dubai to play the Dubai Tennis Championships. Having dropped to No. 7 in the world two weeks before, he was the tournament's No. 2 seed. In the first two rounds, he defeated Philipp Kohlschreiber and Fernando Verdasco in three sets, advancing to a quarterfinal match against Márton Fucsovics. Federer defeated Fucsovics in straight sets, booking his place in the semifinals to face the 22-year-old and No. 6 seed Borna Ćorić. He defeated Ćorić, also in straight sets, to set a final against another youngster, Stefanos Tsitsipas, in a rematch from their Australian Open encounter in January – which Federer lost. By defeating Tsitsipas in straight sets, Federer won the tournament and made history by becoming the second male tennis player in history to reach 100 singles titles. With his victory, he returned to No. 4 in the ATP rankings.

==== Indian Wells Masters ====
Fresh off his victory in Dubai, Federer began his participation in the Indian Wells Masters by defeating Peter Gojowczyk in straight sets on the second round, after getting a first round bye. He then defeated his fellow countryman Stan Wawrinka in dominant fashion, also in straight sets, to book his first ever meeting with Kyle Edmund in the fourth round. He defeated Edmund in straight sets to secure a place in the quarterfinals, setting up another first ever encounter with Hubert Hurkacz. Federer defeated Hurkacz, again in two sets, to set a blockbuster semifinal with Rafael Nadal, which would have been the thirty-ninth meeting in their famous rivalry. However, Nadal was forced to withdraw from the tournament due to a knee injury sustained in his last match – and therefore, Federer reached a record-breaking ninth tournament final. In the final, he was defeated by the No. 7 seed Dominic Thiem in a three-set match.

==== Miami Open ====
Federer next played in the Miami Open as the No. 4 seed, following the withdrawal of Rafael Nadal. This was the first edition of the tournament following the location change from Key Biscayne to the Hard Rock Stadium in Miami Gardens. After the usual first round bye, he defeated Radu Albot, Filip Krajinović and the No. 13 seed Daniil Medvedev in succession to advance to a quarterfinal match with the No. 6 seed Kevin Anderson. With a bagel in the first set, he defeated Anderson in straight sets. This was Federer's 1200th match win in his professional career, setting up a semifinal against the 19-year-old Denis Shapovalov – a first time encounter between the two. Federer ended up easily defeating Shapovalov to reach his third final of the season. He also became the first player to reach 50 Masters 1000 tournament finals, breaking the tie with Rafael Nadal. In the final, he defeated John Isner in straight sets to win the 28th Masters 1000 title of his career.

=== Spring clay court season ===
==== Madrid Open ====
For the first time in three years, Roger Federer committed to play the spring clay court season. His first tournament was the Madrid Open, a Masters 1000 tournament, which he played as the No. 4 seed. In his first clay court match since 2016, and after a first round bye, he defeated Richard Gasquet in straight sets – on the twentieth meeting between the two – in under an hour of play. In the third round, he defeated Gaël Monfils in three sets, with the final set decided in a tiebreak after saving two match points. Therefore, he reached the quarterfinals, where he lost to Dominic Thiem in three sets – this time squandering two match points himself in the second set tiebreak.

==== Italian Open ====
Following the loss at the Madrid Open, Federer confirmed his presence at the Italian Open on the week after. After a first round bye, and due to a rain delay on the day before, Federer defeated João Sousa – in straight sets – and Borna Ćorić – in a third set tiebreak, saving once again two match points – on the same day, in the second and third rounds, respectively, to qualify for the quarterfinals. However, he was forced to withdraw before the match against Stefanos Tsitsipas due to a right leg injury.

==== French Open ====
For the first time in four years, Federer played the season's second and only clay court major, the French Open. He entered the tournament as the No. 3 seed and made a successful return by defeating Lorenzo Sonego in straight sets. He advanced to the quarterfinals without losing a set, defeating lucky loser Oscar Otte, 20-year-old Casper Ruud, and Leonardo Mayer, to set up an encounter with compatriot and 2015 champion Stan Wawrinka, who defeated him the last time he entered the tournament. After four tight sets, Federer defeated Wawrinka to set up a semifinal clash with Rafael Nadal, resuming their storied rivalry at the French Open for the sixth time. Federer ended up losing in straight sets to Nadal, ending his French Open run in the semifinals.

=== Grass court season ===
==== Halle Open ====
Federer opened his grass court season at the Halle Open, where he was a nine-time tournament winner, as the No. 1 seed. In the first round he defeated John Millman, who defeated him in the fourth round of last year's US Open. He then survived consecutive three-set battles against Jo-Wilfried Tsonga and Roberto Bautista Agut to advance to a fifteenth semifinal in Halle. There, he easily defeated Pierre-Hugues Herbert to reach a record-extending thirteenth final, where he bested David Goffin in straight sets to capture a record-extending tenth Halle title and No. 102 overall. This marked the first time in his career that Federer won a single event 10 times.

==== Wimbledon ====
Due to his victory in Halle, Federer advanced to Wimbledon – the third Grand Slam of the season – as the No. 2 seed. He started the tournament with a four-set victory over Lloyd Harris. In the next three rounds, he defeated Jay Clarke, No. 27 seed Lucas Pouille and No. 17 seed Matteo Berrettini, without losing a set. In a quarterfinal clash with the world No. 7 Kei Nishikori, Federer won in four sets, advancing to his thirteenth Wimbledon semifinal and becoming the first man in history to win 100 matches at a Grand Slam tournament. Eleven years after their epic 2008 final, he defeated his rival Rafael Nadal in the semifinals after four sets. It was the fortieth encounter in their rivalry. Federer then faced Novak Djokovic in the final, against whom he lost in a five set thriller lasting four hours and fifty seven minutes, despite having two championship points on serve in the fifth set. The match also marked the first time that a fifth set tiebreaker was played at 12–12 in a singles match and was the longest men's final in Wimbledon history.

=== North American hard court season ===
==== Cincinnati Masters ====
Federer made his first appearance since the Wimbledon final at the Cincinnati Masters, the season's seventh Masters 1000 tournament, as the No. 3 seed, after withdrawing from the Canadian Open played the week before. After a first round bye, he defeated Juan Ignacio Londero, in the second round, on his opening match. In the third round, however, he lost in straight sets to Andrey Rublev.

==== US Open ====
Federer moved on to New York City to play the US Open, the season's last Grand Slam, as the No. 3 seed. He opened his participation with a four-set win against qualifier Sumit Nagal, booking a second round encounter with Damir Džumhur. With this first round win, he qualified for a record-extending seventeenth ATP Finals. Despite losing the first set again, he defeated Džumhur in four sets. Then, Federer easily defeated Daniel Evans in the third round and David Goffin in the fourth round, both in straight sets, in 80 and 79 minutes, respectively, to advance to the quarterfinals. This marked the thirteenth time that Federer has reached the quarterfinal stage at the US Open, tying Andre Agassi and only trailing Jimmy Connors' seventeen times. He lost to Grigor Dimitrov in a five-setter, despite having taken a two-sets-to-one lead.

=== Asian swing ===
==== Shanghai Masters ====
Federer's return to the ATP Tour level tournaments happened in Shanghai, for the Shanghai Masters. He was the No. 2 seed and therefore had a bye in the first round. In the second and third rounds, he defeated Albert Ramos Viñolas and David Goffin, both in straight sets, to advance to a quarterfinal meeting against Alexander Zverev. Despite having saved five match points in the second set, he ended up losing in three sets to Zverev.

=== European indoor hard court season ===
==== Swiss Indoors ====
Federer advanced to his hometown tournament, the Swiss Indoors, as the two-time defending champion. His first round match, against Peter Gojowczyk, is remarkable for being the 1500th match of his career. He easily defeated Gojowczyk, in the first round, and Radu Albot, in the second round, both in straight sets, to reach a quarterfinal match against Stan Wawrinka. However, due to a back injury, Wawrinka was forced to withdraw from the match – and therefore, Federer advanced to the semifinals. In the semifinals, he defeated the world No. 7 Stefanos Tsitsipas in straight sets, earning his fiftieth win of the season and successfully advancing to the tournament final. In the final, he defeated Alex de Minaur in straight sets to win a record-extending tenth Swiss Indoors title without dropping a set.

==== Paris Masters ====
In the following week, Federer was scheduled to play the last Masters 1000 tournament of the season, the Paris Masters. However, he had to withdraw from the tournament to manage his schedule and to prepare for the ATP Finals.

==== ATP Finals ====
The last official tournament of the season, for Federer, was the ATP Finals in London. As the No. 3 seed, he was drawn in the group Björn Borg along with Novak Djokovic, Dominic Thiem and Matteo Berrettini. His first match was a straight-set loss to Thiem, followed by a victory in straight sets against Berretini to keep him alive in the group standings. His last group match was a straight-set win against Djokovic, his first victory against him since the 2015 edition of the tournament. Therefore, he finished the group in second place and advanced to the semifinals. There, he lost in straight sets to Stefanos Tsitsipas, in the match that officially ended his season.

== All matches ==
This table chronicles all the matches of Roger Federer in 2019, including walkovers (W/O) which the ATP does not count as wins.

Key
W	F	SF	QF	#R	RR	Q#	P#	DNQ	A	Z#	PO	G	S	B	NMS	NTI	P	NH

(W) winner; (F) finalist; (SF) semifinalist; (QF) quarterfinalist; (#R) rounds 4, 3, 2, 1; (RR) round-robin stage; (Q#) qualification round; (P#) preliminary round; (DNQ) did not qualify; (A) absent; (Z#) Davis/Fed Cup Zonal Group (with number indication) or (PO) play-off; (G) gold, (S) silver or (B) bronze Olympic/Paralympic medal; (NMS) not a Masters tournament; (NTI) not a Tier I tournament; (P) postponed; (NH) not held; (SR) strike rate (events won / competed); (W–L) win–loss record.

=== Singles matches ===
Tournament	Match	Round	Opponent (seed or key)	Rank	Result	Score
Australian Open; Melbourne, Australia; Grand Slam tournament Hard, outdoor 14 – 27 January 2019
Australian Open; Melbourne, Australia; Grand Slam tournament Hard, outdoor 14 – 27 January 2019	1 / 1445	1R	(Uzbekistan) Denis Istomin	101	Win	6–3, 6–4, 6–4
Australian Open; Melbourne, Australia; Grand Slam tournament Hard, outdoor 14 – 27 January 2019	2 / 1446	2R	(United Kingdom) Daniel Evans (Q)	189	Win	7–6^{(7–5)}, 7–6^{(7–3)}, 6–3
Australian Open; Melbourne, Australia; Grand Slam tournament Hard, outdoor 14 – 27 January 2019	3 / 1447	3R	(United States) Taylor Fritz	50	Win	6–2, 7–5, 6–2
Australian Open; Melbourne, Australia; Grand Slam tournament Hard, outdoor 14 – 27 January 2019	4 / 1448	4R	(Greece) Stefanos Tsitsipas (14)	15	Loss	7–6^{(13–11)}, 6–7^{(3–7)}, 5–7, 6–7^{(5–7)}
Dubai Tennis Championships; Dubai, United Arab Emirates; ATP 500; Hard, outdoor 25 February – 2 March 2019
Dubai Tennis Championships; Dubai, United Arab Emirates; ATP 500; Hard, outdoor 25 February – 2 March 2019	5 / 1449	1R	(Germany) Philipp Kohlschreiber	31	Win	6–4, 3–6, 6–1
Dubai Tennis Championships; Dubai, United Arab Emirates; ATP 500; Hard, outdoor 25 February – 2 March 2019	6 / 1450	2R	(Spain) Fernando Verdasco	32	Win	6–3, 3–6, 6–3
Dubai Tennis Championships; Dubai, United Arab Emirates; ATP 500; Hard, outdoor 25 February – 2 March 2019	7 / 1451	QF	(Hungary) Márton Fucsovics	35	Win	7–6^{(8–6)}, 6–4
Dubai Tennis Championships; Dubai, United Arab Emirates; ATP 500; Hard, outdoor 25 February – 2 March 2019	8 / 1452	SF	(Croatia) Borna Ćorić (6)	13	Win	6–2, 6–2
Dubai Tennis Championships; Dubai, United Arab Emirates; ATP 500; Hard, outdoor 25 February – 2 March 2019	9 / 1453	W	(Greece) Stefanos Tsitsipas (5)	11	Win (1)	6–4, 6–4
Indian Wells Masters; Indian Wells, United States; ATP 1000; Hard, outdoor 4 – 17 March 2019
Indian Wells Masters; Indian Wells, United States; ATP 1000; Hard, outdoor 4 – 17 March 2019	–	1R	Bye			
Indian Wells Masters; Indian Wells, United States; ATP 1000; Hard, outdoor 4 – 17 March 2019	10 / 1454	2R	(Germany) Peter Gojowczyk	85	Win	6–1, 7–5
Indian Wells Masters; Indian Wells, United States; ATP 1000; Hard, outdoor 4 – 17 March 2019	11 / 1455	3R	(Switzerland) Stan Wawrinka	40	Win	6–3, 6–4
Indian Wells Masters; Indian Wells, United States; ATP 1000; Hard, outdoor 4 – 17 March 2019	12 / 1456	4R	(United Kingdom) Kyle Edmund (22)	23	Win	6–1, 6–4
Indian Wells Masters; Indian Wells, United States; ATP 1000; Hard, outdoor 4 – 17 March 2019	13 / 1457	QF	(Poland) Hubert Hurkacz	67	Win	6–4, 6–4
Indian Wells Masters; Indian Wells, United States; ATP 1000; Hard, outdoor 4 – 17 March 2019	–	SF	(Spain) Rafael Nadal (2)	2	Walkover	N/A
Indian Wells Masters; Indian Wells, United States; ATP 1000; Hard, outdoor 4 – 17 March 2019	14 / 1458	F	(Austria) Dominic Thiem (7)	8	Loss	6–3, 3–6, 5–7
Miami Open; Miami, United States; ATP 1000; Hard, outdoor 18 – 31 March 2019
Miami Open; Miami, United States; ATP 1000; Hard, outdoor 18 – 31 March 2019	–	1R	Bye			
Miami Open; Miami, United States; ATP 1000; Hard, outdoor 18 – 31 March 2019	15 / 1459	2R	(Moldova) Radu Albot (Q)	46	Win	4–6, 7–5, 6–3
Miami Open; Miami, United States; ATP 1000; Hard, outdoor 18 – 31 March 2019	16 / 1460	3R	(Serbia) Filip Krajinović	103	Win	7–5, 6–3
Miami Open; Miami, United States; ATP 1000; Hard, outdoor 18 – 31 March 2019	17 / 1461	4R	(Russia) Daniil Medvedev (13)	15	Win	6–4, 6–2
Miami Open; Miami, United States; ATP 1000; Hard, outdoor 18 – 31 March 2019	18 / 1462	QF	(South Africa) Kevin Anderson (6)	7	Win	6–0, 6–4
Miami Open; Miami, United States; ATP 1000; Hard, outdoor 18 – 31 March 2019	19 / 1463	SF	(Canada) Denis Shapovalov (20)	23	Win	6–2, 6–4
Miami Open; Miami, United States; ATP 1000; Hard, outdoor 18 – 31 March 2019	20 / 1464	W	(United States) John Isner (7)	9	Win (2)	6–1, 6–4
Madrid Open; Madrid, Spain; ATP 1000; Clay, outdoor 5 – 12 May 2019
Madrid Open; Madrid, Spain; ATP 1000; Clay, outdoor 5 – 12 May 2019	–	1R	Bye			
Madrid Open; Madrid, Spain; ATP 1000; Clay, outdoor 5 – 12 May 2019	21 / 1465	2R	(France) Richard Gasquet	39	Win	6–2, 6–3
Madrid Open; Madrid, Spain; ATP 1000; Clay, outdoor 5 – 12 May 2019	22 / 1466	3R	(France) Gaël Monfils (15)	18	Win	6–0, 4–6, 7–6^{(7–3)}
Madrid Open; Madrid, Spain; ATP 1000; Clay, outdoor 5 – 12 May 2019	23 / 1467	QF	(Austria) Dominic Thiem (5)	5	Loss	6–3, 6–7^{(11–13)}, 4–6
Italian Open; Rome, Italy; ATP 1000; Clay, outdoor 12 – 19 May 2019
Italian Open; Rome, Italy; ATP 1000; Clay, outdoor 12 – 19 May 2019	–	1R	Bye			
Italian Open; Rome, Italy; ATP 1000; Clay, outdoor 12 – 19 May 2019	24 / 1468	2R	(Portugal) João Sousa	72	Win	6–4, 6–3
Italian Open; Rome, Italy; ATP 1000; Clay, outdoor 12 – 19 May 2019	25 / 1469	3R	(Croatia) Borna Ćorić (13)	15	Win	2–6, 6–4, 7–6^{(9–7)}
Italian Open; Rome, Italy; ATP 1000; Clay, outdoor 12 – 19 May 2019	–	QF	(Greece) Stefanos Tsitsipas (8)	7	Withdrew	N/A
French Open; Paris, France; Grand Slam tournament Clay, outdoor 26 May – 9 June 2019
French Open; Paris, France; Grand Slam tournament Clay, outdoor 26 May – 9 June 2019	26 / 1470	1R	(Italy) Lorenzo Sonego	74	Win	6–2, 6–4, 6–4
French Open; Paris, France; Grand Slam tournament Clay, outdoor 26 May – 9 June 2019	27 / 1471	2R	(Germany) Oscar Otte (LL)	144	Win	6–4, 6–3, 6–4
French Open; Paris, France; Grand Slam tournament Clay, outdoor 26 May – 9 June 2019	28 / 1472	3R	(Norway) Casper Ruud	63	Win	6–3, 6–1, 7–6^{(10–8)}
French Open; Paris, France; Grand Slam tournament Clay, outdoor 26 May – 9 June 2019	29 / 1473	4R	(Argentina) Leonardo Mayer	68	Win	6–2, 6–3, 6–3
French Open; Paris, France; Grand Slam tournament Clay, outdoor 26 May – 9 June 2019	30 / 1474	QF	(Switzerland) Stan Wawrinka (24)	28	Win	7–6^{(7–4)}, 4–6, 7–6^{(7–5)}, 6–4
French Open; Paris, France; Grand Slam tournament Clay, outdoor 26 May – 9 June 2019	31 / 1475	SF	(Spain) Rafael Nadal (2)	2	Loss	3–6, 4–6, 2–6
Halle Open; Halle, Germany; ATP 500; Grass, outdoor 17 – 23 June 2019
Halle Open; Halle, Germany; ATP 500; Grass, outdoor 17 – 23 June 2019	32 / 1476	1R	(Australia) John Millman	57	Win	7–6^{(7–1)}, 6–3
Halle Open; Halle, Germany; ATP 500; Grass, outdoor 17 – 23 June 2019	33 / 1477	2R	(France) Jo-Wilfried Tsonga (WC)	77	Win	7–6^{(7–5)}, 4–6, 7–5
Halle Open; Halle, Germany; ATP 500; Grass, outdoor 17 – 23 June 2019	34 / 1478	QF	(Spain) Roberto Bautista Agut (7)	20	Win	6–3, 4–6, 6–4
Halle Open; Halle, Germany; ATP 500; Grass, outdoor 17 – 23 June 2019	35 / 1479	SF	(France) Pierre-Hugues Herbert	43	Win	6–3, 6–3
Halle Open; Halle, Germany; ATP 500; Grass, outdoor 17 – 23 June 2019	36 / 1480	W	(Belgium) David Goffin	33	Win (3)	7–6^{(7–2)}, 6–1
Wimbledon Championships; London, United Kingdom; Grand Slam tournament Grass, outdoor 1 – 14 July 2019
Wimbledon Championships; London, United Kingdom; Grand Slam tournament Grass, outdoor 1 – 14 July 2019	37 / 1481	1R	(South Africa) Lloyd Harris	86	Win	3–6, 6–1, 6–2, 6–2
Wimbledon Championships; London, United Kingdom; Grand Slam tournament Grass, outdoor 1 – 14 July 2019	38 / 1482	2R	(United Kingdom) Jay Clarke (WC)	169	Win	6–1, 7–6^{(7–3)}, 6–2
Wimbledon Championships; London, United Kingdom; Grand Slam tournament Grass, outdoor 1 – 14 July 2019	39 / 1483	3R	(France) Lucas Pouille (27)	28	Win	7–5, 6–2, 7–6^{(7–4)}
Wimbledon Championships; London, United Kingdom; Grand Slam tournament Grass, outdoor 1 – 14 July 2019	40 / 1484	4R	(Italy) Matteo Berrettini (17)	20	Win	6–1, 6–2, 6–2
Wimbledon Championships; London, United Kingdom; Grand Slam tournament Grass, outdoor 1 – 14 July 2019	41 / 1485	QF	(Japan) Kei Nishikori (8)	7	Win	4–6, 6–1, 6–4, 6–4
Wimbledon Championships; London, United Kingdom; Grand Slam tournament Grass, outdoor 1 – 14 July 2019	42 / 1486	SF	(Spain) Rafael Nadal (3)	2	Win	7–6^{(7–3)}, 1–6, 6–3, 6–4
Wimbledon Championships; London, United Kingdom; Grand Slam tournament Grass, outdoor 1 – 14 July 2019	43 / 1487	F	(Serbia) Novak Djokovic (1)	1	Loss	6–7^{(5–7)}, 6–1, 6–7^{(4–7)}, 6–4, 12–13^{(3–7)}
Cincinnati Masters; Cincinnati, United States; ATP 1000; Hard, outdoor 11 – 18 August 2019
Cincinnati Masters; Cincinnati, United States; ATP 1000; Hard, outdoor 11 – 18 August 2019	–	1R	Bye			
Cincinnati Masters; Cincinnati, United States; ATP 1000; Hard, outdoor 11 – 18 August 2019	44 / 1488	2R	(Argentina) Juan Ignacio Londero (WC)	55	Win	6–3, 6–4
Cincinnati Masters; Cincinnati, United States; ATP 1000; Hard, outdoor 11 – 18 August 2019	45 / 1489	3R	(Russia) Andrey Rublev (Q)	70	Loss	3–6, 4–6
US Open; New York City, United States; Grand Slam tournament Hard, outdoor 26 August – 8 September 2019
US Open; New York City, United States; Grand Slam tournament Hard, outdoor 26 August – 8 September 2019	46 / 1490	1R	(India) Sumit Nagal (Q)	190	Win	4–6, 6–1, 6–2, 6–4
US Open; New York City, United States; Grand Slam tournament Hard, outdoor 26 August – 8 September 2019	47 / 1491	2R	(Bosnia and Herzegovina) Damir Džumhur	99	Win	3–6, 6–2, 6–3, 6–4
US Open; New York City, United States; Grand Slam tournament Hard, outdoor 26 August – 8 September 2019	48 / 1492	3R	(United Kingdom) Daniel Evans	58	Win	6–2, 6–2, 6–1
US Open; New York City, United States; Grand Slam tournament Hard, outdoor 26 August – 8 September 2019	49 / 1493	4R	(Belgium) David Goffin (15)	15	Win	6–2, 6–2, 6–0
US Open; New York City, United States; Grand Slam tournament Hard, outdoor 26 August – 8 September 2019	50 / 1494	QF	(Bulgaria) Grigor Dimitrov	78	Loss	6–3, 4–6, 6–3, 4–6, 2–6
Laver Cup; Geneva, Switzerland; Laver Cup; Hard, indoor 20 – 22 September 2019
Laver Cup; Geneva, Switzerland; Laver Cup; Hard, indoor 20 – 22 September 2019	51 / 1495	Day 2	(Australia) Nick Kyrgios	27	Win	6–7^{(5–7)}, 7–5, [10–7]
Laver Cup; Geneva, Switzerland; Laver Cup; Hard, indoor 20 – 22 September 2019	52 / 1496	Day 3	(United States) John Isner	20	Win	6–4, 7–6^{(7–3)}
Shanghai Masters; Shanghai, China; ATP 1000; Hard, outdoor 6 – 13 October 2019
Shanghai Masters; Shanghai, China; ATP 1000; Hard, outdoor 6 – 13 October 2019	–	1R	Bye			
Shanghai Masters; Shanghai, China; ATP 1000; Hard, outdoor 6 – 13 October 2019	53 / 1497	2R	(Spain) Albert Ramos Viñolas	46	Win	6–2, 7–6^{(7–5)}
Shanghai Masters; Shanghai, China; ATP 1000; Hard, outdoor 6 – 13 October 2019	54 / 1498	3R	(Belgium) David Goffin (13)	14	Win	7–6^{(9–7)}, 6–4
Shanghai Masters; Shanghai, China; ATP 1000; Hard, outdoor 6 – 13 October 2019	55 / 1499	QF	(Germany) Alexander Zverev (5)	6	Loss	3–6, 7–6^{(9–7)}, 3–6
Swiss Indoors; Basel, Switzerland; ATP 500; Hard, indoor 21 – 27 October 2019
Swiss Indoors; Basel, Switzerland; ATP 500; Hard, indoor 21 – 27 October 2019	56 / 1500	1R	(Germany) Peter Gojowczyk (Q)	112	Win	6–2, 6–1
Swiss Indoors; Basel, Switzerland; ATP 500; Hard, indoor 21 – 27 October 2019	57 / 1501	2R	(Moldova) Radu Albot	49	Win	6–0, 6–3
Swiss Indoors; Basel, Switzerland; ATP 500; Hard, indoor 21 – 27 October 2019	–	QF	(Switzerland) Stan Wawrinka (7)	17	Walkover	N/A
Swiss Indoors; Basel, Switzerland; ATP 500; Hard, indoor 21 – 27 October 2019	58 / 1502	SF	(Greece) Stefanos Tsitsipas (3)	7	Win	6–4, 6–4
Swiss Indoors; Basel, Switzerland; ATP 500; Hard, indoor 21 – 27 October 2019	59 / 1503	W	(Australia) Alex de Minaur (WC)	28	Win (4)	6–2, 6–2
Paris Masters; Paris, France; ATP 1000; Hard, indoor 28 October – 3 November 2019
Paris Masters; Paris, France; ATP 1000; Hard, indoor 28 October – 3 November 2019	Withdrew					
ATP Finals; London, United Kingdom; ATP Finals; Hard, indoor 10 – 17 November 2019
ATP Finals; London, United Kingdom; ATP Finals; Hard, indoor 10 – 17 November 2019	60 / 1504	RR	(Austria) Dominic Thiem (5)	5	Loss	5–7, 5–7
ATP Finals; London, United Kingdom; ATP Finals; Hard, indoor 10 – 17 November 2019	61 / 1505	RR	(Italy) Matteo Berrettini (8)	8	Win	7–6^{(7–2)}, 6–3
ATP Finals; London, United Kingdom; ATP Finals; Hard, indoor 10 – 17 November 2019	62 / 1506	RR	(Serbia) Novak Djokovic (2)	2	Win	6–4, 6–3
ATP Finals; London, United Kingdom; ATP Finals; Hard, indoor 10 – 17 November 2019	63 / 1507	SF	(Greece) Stefanos Tsitsipas (6)	6	Loss	3–6, 4–6

=== Doubles matches ===
Tournament	Match	Round	Opponents (seed or key)	Ranks	Result	Score
Laver Cup; Geneva, Switzerland; Laver Cup; Hard, indoor 20 – 22 September 2019; Partner: (Germany) Alexander Zverev (Day 1) (Greece) Stefanos Tsitsipas (Day 3)
Laver Cup; Geneva, Switzerland; Laver Cup; Hard, indoor 20 – 22 September 2019; Partner: (Germany) Alexander Zverev (Day 1) (Greece) Stefanos Tsitsipas (Day 3)	1 / 222	Day 1	(Canada) Denis Shapovalov / (United States) Jack Sock	68 / 37	Win	6–3, 7–5
Laver Cup; Geneva, Switzerland; Laver Cup; Hard, indoor 20 – 22 September 2019; Partner: (Germany) Alexander Zverev (Day 1) (Greece) Stefanos Tsitsipas (Day 3)	2 / 223	Day 3	(United States) John Isner / (United States) Jack Sock	179 / 37	Loss	7–5, 4–6, [8–10]

=== Hopman Cup matches ===
==== Singles ====
Tournament	Match	Round	Opponent (seed or key)	Rank	Result	Score
Hopman Cup; Perth, Australia; Hopman Cup; Hard, indoor 29 December 2018 – 5 January 2019
Hopman Cup; Perth, Australia; Hopman Cup; Hard, indoor 29 December 2018 – 5 January 2019	1 / 29	RR	(United Kingdom) Cameron Norrie	90	Win	6–1, 6–1
Hopman Cup; Perth, Australia; Hopman Cup; Hard, indoor 29 December 2018 – 5 January 2019	3 / 31	RR	(United States) Frances Tiafoe	39	Win	6–4, 6–1
Hopman Cup; Perth, Australia; Hopman Cup; Hard, indoor 29 December 2018 – 5 January 2019	5 / 33	RR	(Greece) Stefanos Tsitsipas	15	Win	7–6^{(7–5)}, 7–6^{(7–4)}
Hopman Cup; Perth, Australia; Hopman Cup; Hard, indoor 29 December 2018 – 5 January 2019	7 / 35	W	(Germany) Alexander Zverev	4	Win	6–4, 6–2

==== Mixed doubles ====
Tournament	Match	Round	Opponents (seed or key)	Ranks	Result	Score
Hopman Cup; Perth, Australia; Hopman Cup; Hard, indoor 29 December 2018 – 5 January 2019; Partner: (Switzerland) Belinda Bencic
Hopman Cup; Perth, Australia; Hopman Cup; Hard, indoor 29 December 2018 – 5 January 2019; Partner: (Switzerland) Belinda Bencic	2 / 30	RR	(United Kingdom) Katie Boulter / (United Kingdom) Cameron Norrie	– / –	Win	4–3^{(5–4)}, 4–1
Hopman Cup; Perth, Australia; Hopman Cup; Hard, indoor 29 December 2018 – 5 January 2019; Partner: (Switzerland) Belinda Bencic	4 / 32	RR	(United States) Serena Williams / (United States) Frances Tiafoe	– / –	Win	4–2, 4–3^{(5–3)}
Hopman Cup; Perth, Australia; Hopman Cup; Hard, indoor 29 December 2018 – 5 January 2019; Partner: (Switzerland) Belinda Bencic	6 / 34	RR	(Greece) Maria Sakkari / (Greece) Stefanos Tsitsipas	– / –	Loss	3–4^{(4–5)}, 4–2, 3–4^{(3–5)}
Hopman Cup; Perth, Australia; Hopman Cup; Hard, indoor 29 December 2018 – 5 January 2019; Partner: (Switzerland) Belinda Bencic	8 / 36	W	(Germany) Angelique Kerber / (Germany) Alexander Zverev	– / –	Win	4–0, 1–4, 4–3^{(5–4)}

== Exhibition matches ==
=== Singles ===
Tournament	Match	Round	Opponent (seed or key)	Rank	Result	Score
Uniqlo LifeWear Day Tokyo; Tokyo, Japan; Exhibition; Hard, indoor 14 October 2019
Uniqlo LifeWear Day Tokyo; Tokyo, Japan; Exhibition; Hard, indoor 14 October 2019	2	–	(United States) John Isner	16	Win	6–3, 7–6^{(7–3)}
Latin America tour Santiago, Chile; Buenos Aires, Argentina; Mexico City, Mexico; Quito, Ecuador; Exhibition; Hard, indoor 19, 20, 23 and 24 November 2019
Latin America tour Santiago, Chile; Buenos Aires, Argentina; Mexico City, Mexico; Quito, Ecuador; Exhibition; Hard, indoor 19, 20, 23 and 24 November 2019	1	–	(Germany) Alexander Zverev	7	Win	6–3, 4–6, 6–4
Latin America tour Santiago, Chile; Buenos Aires, Argentina; Mexico City, Mexico; Quito, Ecuador; Exhibition; Hard, indoor 19, 20, 23 and 24 November 2019	2	–	(Germany) Alexander Zverev	7	Loss	6–7^{(3–7)}, 6–7^{(2–7)}
Latin America tour Santiago, Chile; Buenos Aires, Argentina; Mexico City, Mexico; Quito, Ecuador; Exhibition; Hard, indoor 19, 20, 23 and 24 November 2019	3	–	(Germany) Alexander Zverev	7	Win	3–6, 6–4, 6–2
Latin America tour Santiago, Chile; Buenos Aires, Argentina; Mexico City, Mexico; Quito, Ecuador; Exhibition; Hard, indoor 19, 20, 23 and 24 November 2019	4	–	(Germany) Alexander Zverev	7	Win	6–3, 6–4

=== Doubles ===
Tournament	Match	Round	Opponents (seed or key)	Ranks	Result	Score
Uniqlo LifeWear Day Tokyo; Tokyo, Japan; Exhibition; Hard, indoor 14 October 2019; Partner: (Japan) Shingo Kunieda
Uniqlo LifeWear Day Tokyo; Tokyo, Japan; Exhibition; Hard, indoor 14 October 2019; Partner: (Japan) Shingo Kunieda	1	–	(United States) John Isner / (United Kingdom) Gordon Reid	– / –	Loss	[9–10]

== Schedule ==
=== Singles schedule ===
Date	Tournament	Location	Tier	Surface	Prev. result	Prev. points	New points	Result
14 January 2019– 27 January 2019	Australian Open	Melbourne (AUS)	Grand Slam	Hard	W	2000	180	Fourth round (lost to Stefanos Tsitsipas, 7–6^{(13–11)}, 6–7^{(3–7)}, 5–7, 6–7^{(5–7)})
25 February 2019– 2 March 2019	Dubai Tennis Championships	Dubai (UAE)	500 Series	Hard	A	N/A	500	Champion (defeated Stefanos Tsitsipas, 6–4, 6–4)
4 March 2019– 17 March 2019	Indian Wells Masters	Indian Wells (USA)	Masters 1000	Hard	F	600	600	Final (lost to Dominic Thiem, 6–3, 3–6, 5–7)
18 March 2019– 31 March 2019	Miami Open	Miami (USA)	Masters 1000	Hard	2R	10	1000	Champion (defeated John Isner, 6–1, 6–4)
5 May 2019– 12 May 2019	Madrid Open	Madrid (ESP)	Masters 1000	Clay	A	N/A	180	Quarterfinals (lost to Dominic Thiem, 6–3, 6–7^{(11–13)}, 4–6)
12 May 2019– 19 May 2019	Italian Open	Rome (ITA)	Masters 1000	Clay	A	N/A	180	Quarterfinals (withdrew to Stefanos Tsitsipas)
26 May 2019– 9 June 2019	French Open	Paris (FRA)	Grand Slam	Clay	A	N/A	720	Semifinals (lost to Rafael Nadal, 3–6, 4–6, 2–6)
17 June 2019– 23 June 2019	Halle Open	Halle (GER)	500 Series	Grass	F	300	500	Champion (defeated David Goffin, 7–6^{(7–2)}, 6–1)
1 July 2019– 14 July 2019	Wimbledon	London (GBR)	Grand Slam	Grass	QF	360	1200	Final (lost to Novak Djokovic, 6–7^{(5–7)}, 6–1, 6–7^{(4–7)}, 6–4, 12–13^{(3–7)})
11 August 2019– 18 August 2019	Cincinnati Masters	Cincinnati (USA)	Masters 1000	Hard	F	600	90	Third round (lost to Andrey Rublev, 3–6, 4–6)
26 August 2019– 8 September 2019	US Open	New York (USA)	Grand Slam	Hard	4R	180	360	Quarterfinals (lost to Grigor Dimitrov, 6–3, 4–6, 6–3, 4–6, 2–6)
20 September 2019– 22 September 2019	Laver Cup	Geneva (SUI)	Laver Cup	Hard (i)	W	N/A	N/A	Europe defeated World, 13–11
6 October 2019– 13 October 2019	Shanghai Masters	Shanghai (CHN)	Masters 1000	Hard	SF	360	180	Quarterfinals (lost to Alexander Zverev, 3–6, 7–6^{(9–7)}, 3–6)
21 October 2019– 27 October 2019	Swiss Indoors	Basel (SUI)	500 Series	Hard (i)	W	500	500	Champion (defeated Alex de Minaur, 6–2, 6–2)
28 October 2019– 3 November 2019	Paris Masters	Paris (FRA)	Masters 1000	Hard (i)	SF	360	N/A	Withdrew due to schedule change
10 November 2019– 17 November 2019	ATP Finals	London (GBR)	Tour Finals	Hard (i)	SF	400	400	Semifinals (lost to Stefanos Tsitsipas, 3–6, 4–6)
Total year-end points						6420	6590	▲170 difference

=== Doubles schedule ===
Date	Tournament	Location	Category	Surface	Prev. result	Prev. points	New points	Result
20 September 2019– 22 September 2019	Laver Cup	Geneva (SUI)	Laver Cup	Hard (i)	W	N/A	N/A	Europe defeated World, 13–11
Total year-end points						0	0	0 difference

== Yearly records ==
=== Head-to-head matchups ===
==== ATP and Grand Slam sanctioned matches ====
Roger Federer has a 53–10 ATP match win–loss record in the 2019 season. His record against players who were part of the ATP rankings Top Ten at the time of their meetings is 7–7. Bold indicates player was ranked top 10 at time of at least one meeting. The following list is ordered by number of wins:

- (Belgium) David Goffin 3–0
- (Moldova) Radu Albot 2–0
- (Italy) **Matteo Berrettini** 2–0
- (Croatia) Borna Ćorić 2–0
- (United Kingdom) Daniel Evans 2–0
- (Germany) Peter Gojowczyk 2–0
- (United States) **John Isner** 2–0
- (Switzerland) Stan Wawrinka 2–0
- (Greece) **Stefanos Tsitsipas** 2–2
- (South Africa) **Kevin Anderson** 1–0
- (Spain) Roberto Bautista Agut 1–0
- (United Kingdom) Jay Clarke 1–0
- (Australia) Alex de Minaur 1–0
- (Bosnia and Herzegovina) Damir Džumhur 1–0
- (United Kingdom) Kyle Edmund 1–0
- (United States) Taylor Fritz 1–0
- (Hungary) Márton Fucsovics 1–0
- (France) Richard Gasquet 1–0
- (South Africa) Lloyd Harris 1–0
- (France) Pierre-Hugues Herbert 1–0
- (Poland) Hubert Hurkacz 1–0
- (Uzbekistan) Denis Istomin 1–0
- (Germany) Philipp Kohlschreiber 1–0
- (Serbia) Filip Krajinović 1–0
- (Australia) Nick Kyrgios 1–0
- (Argentina) Juan Ignacio Londero 1–0
- (Argentina) Leonardo Mayer 1–0
- (Russia) Daniil Medvedev 1–0
- (Australia) John Millman 1–0
- (France) Gaël Monfils 1–0
- (India) Sumit Nagal 1–0
- (Japan) **Kei Nishikori** 1–0
- (Germany) Oscar Otte 1–0
- (France) Lucas Pouille 1–0
- (Spain) Albert Ramos Viñolas 1–0
- (Norway) Casper Ruud 1–0
- (Canada) Denis Shapovalov 1–0
- (Italy) Lorenzo Sonego 1–0
- (Portugal) João Sousa 1–0
- (France) Jo-Wilfried Tsonga 1–0
- (Spain) Fernando Verdasco 1–0
- (Serbia) **Novak Djokovic** 1–1
- (Spain) **Rafael Nadal** 1–1
- (Bulgaria) Grigor Dimitrov 0–1
- (Russia) Andrey Rublev 0–1
- (Germany) **Alexander Zverev** 0–1
- (Austria) **Dominic Thiem** 0–3

==== ITF sanctioned matches ====
His official ITF sanctioned season record for 2019 is 57–10. While these are official sanctioned matches per the ITF, the ATP does not count them in their totals. Bold indicates player was ranked top 10 at time of at least one meeting. The extra ITF matches are as follows:

- (United Kingdom) Cameron Norrie 1–0
- (United States) Frances Tiafoe 1–0
- (Greece) Stefanos Tsitsipas 1–0
- (Germany) **Alexander Zverev** 1–0

=== Finals ===
==== Singles: 6 (4 titles, 2 runner-ups) ====
Category Grand Slam (0–1) ATP Finals (0–0) ATP Tour Masters 1000 (1–1) ATP Tour 500 (3–0) ATP Tour 250 (0–0)	Titles by surface Hard (3–1) Clay (0–0) Grass (1–1)	Titles by setting Outdoor (3–2) Indoor (1–0)

Result	W–L	Date	Tournament	Tier	Surface	Opponent	Score
Win	1–0	Mar 2019	Dubai Tennis Championships, United Arab Emirates (8)	500 Series	Hard	(Greece) Stefanos Tsitsipas	6–4, 6–4
Loss	1–1	Mar 2019	Indian Wells Masters, United States	Masters 1000	Hard	(Austria) Dominic Thiem	6–3, 3–6, 5–7
Win	2–1	Mar 2019	Miami Open, United States (4)	Masters 1000	Hard	(United States) John Isner	6–1, 6–4
Win	3–1	Jun 2019	Halle Open, Germany (10)	500 Series	Grass	(Belgium) David Goffin	7–6^{(7–2)}, 6–1
Loss	3–2	Jul 2019	Wimbledon, United Kingdom	Grand Slam	Grass	(Serbia) Novak Djokovic	6–7^{(5–7)}, 6–1, 6–7^{(4–7)}, 6–4, 12–13^{(3–7)}
Win	4–2	Oct 2019	Swiss Indoors, Switzerland (10)	500 Series	Hard (i)	(Australia) Alex de Minaur	6–2, 6–2

==== Team competitions: 2 (2 titles) ====
Result	W–L	Date	Tournament	Tier	Surface	Partner(s)	Opponents	Score
Win	1–0	Jan 2019	Hopman Cup, Australia (3)	Hopman Cup	Hard (i)	(Switzerland) Belinda Bencic	(Germany) Angelique Kerber (Germany) Alexander Zverev	2–1
Win	2–0	Sep 2019	Laver Cup, Switzerland (3)	Laver Cup	Hard (i)	(Spain) Rafael Nadal (Austria) Dominic Thiem (Germany) Alexander Zverev (Greece) Stefanos Tsitsipas (Italy) Fabio Fognini	(United States) John Isner (Canada) Milos Raonic (Australia) Nick Kyrgios (United States) Taylor Fritz (Canada) Denis Shapovalov (United States) Jack Sock	13–11

=== Earnings ===
- **Bold** font denotes tournament win

Event	Prize money	Year-to-date
Australian Open	A$260,000	$187,512
**Dubai Tennis Championships**	$565,635	$753,147
Indian Wells Masters	$686,000	$1,439,147
**Miami Open**	$1,354,010	$2,793,157
Madrid Open	€160,920	$2,973,306
Italian Open	€128,200	$3,117,288
French Open	€590,000	$3,778,206
**Halle Open**	€429,955	$4,260,013
Wimbledon	£1,175,000	$5,751,088
Cincinnati Masters	$74,695	$5,825,783
US Open	$500,000	$6,325,783
Shanghai Masters	$184,000	$6,509,783
**Swiss Indoors**	€430,125	$6,989,975
ATP Finals	$645,000	$7,634,975
Bonus pool	$1,082,000	$8,716,975
		$8,716,975

Figures in United States dollars (USD) unless noted.

=== Awards ===
- ATPTour.com Fans' Favourite
  - Record seventeenth consecutive award in career

== See also ==
- 2019 ATP Tour
- 2019 Rafael Nadal tennis season
- 2019 Novak Djokovic tennis season
