= 2015 City of Onkaparinga ATP Challenger =

- Date: 3–11 January 2015
- Edition: 1st
- Draw: 32S / 16D
- Prize money: $50,000
- Surface: Hard
- Location: Happy Valley, Australia

Champions

Singles
- (United States) Ryan Harrison

Doubles
- (Russia) Andrey Kuznetsov / (Kazakhstan) Aleksandr Nedovyesov
City of Onkaparinga ATP Challenger	· 2016 →

The 2015 City of Onkaparinga ATP Challenger was a professional tennis tournament played on hard courts. It was the first edition of the tournament which was part of the 2015 ATP Challenger Tour. It took place in Happy Valley, Australia between 3–11 January 2015.

== ATP entrants ==
=== Seeds ===
Country	Player	Rank^{1}	Seed
SLO	Blaž Rola	80	1
CYP	Marcos Baghdatis	85	2
RUS	Andrey Kuznetsov	92	3
FRA	Paul-Henri Mathieu	97	4
UKR	Aleksandr Nedovyesov	129	5
JPN	Hiroki Moriya	146	6
USA	Michael Russell	159	7
HUN	Márton Fucsovics	162	8

- Rankings are as of December 15, 2014.

=== Other entrants ===
The following players received wildcards into the singles main draw:

- (Australia) John-Patrick Smith
- (Australia) Omar Jasika
- (Australia) Alex Bolt
- (Australia) Jordan Thompson

The following players received entry from the qualifying draw:

- (Australia) Andrew Whittington
- (Belgium) Maxime Authom
- (Australia) Andrew Harris
- (Australia) Jacob Grills

The following players received entry as a lucky loser:

- (Bosnia and Herzegovina) Aldin Šetkić

== Champions ==
=== Singles ===
- (United States) Ryan Harrison def. (Cyprus) Marcos Baghdatis, 7–6^{(10–8)}, 6–4

=== Doubles ===
- (Russia) Andrey Kuznetsov / (Kazakhstan) Aleksandr Nedovyesov def. (Australia) Alex Bolt / (Australia) Andrew Whittington, 7–5, 6–4
