= 2015 City of Onkaparinga ATP Challenger – Singles =

Singles
- 2015 City of Onkaparinga ATP Challenger

Final
- Champion: (United States) Ryan Harrison
- Runner-up: (Cyprus) Marcos Baghdatis
- Score: 7–6^{(10–8)}, 6–4

Events
Singles	Doubles
City of Onkaparinga ATP Challenger	· 2016 →

This was the first edition of the event.

Ryan Harrison won the title, defeating Marcos Baghdatis 7–6^{(10–8)}, 6–4 in the final.

== Seeds ==
1. (Slovenia) Blaž Rola (second round)
2. (Cyprus) Marcos Baghdatis (final)
3. (Russia) Andrey Kuznetsov (quarterfinals)
4. (France) Paul-Henri Mathieu (quarterfinals)
5. (Kazakhstan) Aleksandr Nedovyesov (quarterfinals)
6. (Japan) Hiroki Moriya (first round)
7. (United States) Michael Russell (withdrew because of laryngitis)
8. (Hungary) Márton Fucsovics (second round)

== Draw ==
=== Key ===
- Q = Qualifier
- WC = Wild card
- LL = Lucky loser
- Alt = Alternate
- SE = Special exempt
- PR = Protected ranking
- ITF = ITF entry
- JE = Junior exempt
- w/o = Walkover
- r = Retired
- d = Defaulted
- SR = Special ranking

=== Finals ===
Semifinals
(United States) Ryan Harrison	6	6
WC	(Australia) Alex Bolt	3	3
Q	(Australia) Andrew Harris	4	4
2	(Cyprus) Marcos Baghdatis	6	6

Final
(United States) Ryan Harrison	7^{10}	6
2	(Cyprus) Marcos Baghdatis	6^{8}	4

=== Top half ===
First round
1	(Slovenia) B Rola	4	6	6
WC	(Australia) O Jasika	6	4	1
(United States) R Harrison	6^{5}	6	6
(South Korea) H Chung	7^{7}	1	1
(United Kingdom) L Broady	6	6
Q	(Australia) Jacob Grills	4	4
Q	(Belgium) M Authom	6	6
LL	(Bosnia and Herzegovina) A Šetkić	4	4
4	(France) P-H Mathieu	7^{7}	6
(Brazil) A Ghem	6^{3}	2
(Germany) P Petzschner	7	1	6^{5}
(Italy) M Viola	5	6	7^{7}
(Argentina) G Andreozzi	3	2
WC	(Australia) A Bolt	6	6
(Ukraine) D Molchanov	6^{2}	4
8	(Hungary) M Fucsovics	7^{7}	6

Second round
1	(Slovenia) B Rola	6	1	5
(United States) R Harrison	1	6	7
(United Kingdom) L Broady	2	4
Q	(Belgium) M Authom	6	6
4	(France) P-H Mathieu	6	6
(Italy) M Viola	1	3
WC	(Australia) A Bolt	3	7^{7}	6
8	(Hungary) M Fucsovics	6	6^{5}	1

Quarterfinals
(United States) R Harrison	5	7	7
Q	(Belgium) M Authom	7	5	5
4	(France) P-H Mathieu	5	5
WC	(Australia) A Bolt	7	7

Semifinals
(United States) R Harrison	6	6
WC	(Australia) A Bolt	3	3

=== Bottom half ===
First round
6	(Japan) H Moriya	5	1
Q	(Australia) A Harris	7	6
(Austria) G Melzer	6^{7}	7^{7}	4
(Estonia) J Zopp	7^{9}	6^{5}	6
(Japan) Y Nishioka	7^{7}	6^{3}	3
(United States) W Odesnik	6^{4}	7^{7}	6
WC	(Australia) J Thompson	2	4
3	(Russia) A Kuznetsov	6	6
5	(Kazakhstan) A Nedovyesov	6	7
(Moldova) R Albot	4	5
(Germany) T Pütz	6	6
(Australia) L Saville	4	4
(China) Z Zhang	3	4
Q	(Australia) A Whittington	6	6
WC	(Australia) J-P Smith	4	3
2	(Cyprus) M Baghdatis	6	6

Second round
Q	(Australia) A Harris	7	6
(Estonia) J Zopp	5	3
(United States) W Odesnik	1	4
3	(Russia) A Kuznetsov	6	6
5	(Kazakhstan) A Nedovyesov	6	4	7^{8}
(Germany) T Pütz	2	6	6^{6}
Q	(Australia) A Whittington	5	3
2	(Cyprus) M Baghdatis	7	6

Quarterfinals
Q	(Australia) A Harris	6	5	6
3	(Russia) A Kuznetsov	2	7	1
5	(Kazakhstan) A Nedovyesov	6	2	2
2	(Cyprus) M Baghdatis	3	6	6

Semifinals
Q	(Australia) A Harris	4	4
2	(Cyprus) M Baghdatis	6	6
