= 2016 City of Onkaparinga ATP Challenger – Doubles =

Doubles
- 2016 City of Onkaparinga ATP Challenger

Final
- Champions: (Italy) Matteo Donati (Kazakhstan) Andrey Golubev
- Runners-up: (Ukraine) Denys Molchanov (Kazakhstan) Aleksandr Nedovyesov
- Score: 3–6, 7–6^{(7–5)}, [10–1]

Events
Singles	Doubles
← 2015 ·	City of Onkaparinga ATP Challenger	· 2017 →

Andrey Kuznetsov and Aleksandr Nedovyesov were the defending champions, but only Aleksandr Nedovyesov returned to defend his title, partnering up with Denys Molchanov.
Matteo Donati and Andrey Golubev beat second seeds Denys Molchanov and Aleksandr Nedovyesov 3–6, 7–6^{(7–5)}, [10–1]

== Seeds ==
1. (Australia) Carsten Ball / (Germany) Frank Moser (first round)
2. (Ukraine) Denys Molchanov / (Kazakhstan) Aleksandr Nedovyesov (final)
3. (Australia) Alex Bolt / (Australia) Andrew Whittington (first round)
4. (United Kingdom) Brydan Klein / (Canada) Peter Polansky (semifinals)

== Draw ==
=== Key ===
- Q = Qualifier
- WC = Wild card
- LL = Lucky loser
- Alt = Alternate
- SE = Special exempt
- PR = Protected ranking
- ITF = ITF entry
- JE = Junior exempt
- w/o = Walkover
- r = Retired
- d = Defaulted
- SR = Special ranking

First round
1	(Australia) C Ball (Germany) F Moser	6^{4}	3
(Italy) M Donati (Kazakhstan) A Golubev	7^{7}	6
WC	(Australia) S de Waard (Australia) M Polmans	6	6
(China) Z Li (United States) F Tiafoe	4	1
4/PR	(United Kingdom) B Klein (Canada) P Polansky	6	6
(Germany) P Gojowczyk (Germany) N Langer	2	3
(Japan) H Moriya (Bosnia and Herzegovina) A Šetkić	4	4
(Belarus) U Ignatik (Czech Republic) J Šátral	6	6
(Serbia) L Đere (Hungary) M Fucsovics	6	6^{3}	[6]
WC	(Australia) H Bourchier (Australia) B Mousley	4	7^{7}	[10]
(Israel) D Sela (Netherlands) I Sijsling	6	6
3	(Australia) A Bolt (Australia) A Whittington	3	3
WC	(Australia) M Barton (Australia) B Mott	5	4
(Colombia) A González (Argentina) R Olivo	7	6
(United States) B Fratangelo (United States) T Fritz	2	6	[10]
2	(Ukraine) D Molchanov (Kazakhstan) A Nedovyesov	6	4	[12]

Quarterfinals
(Italy) M Donati (Kazakhstan) A Golubev	6	6
WC	(Australia) S de Waard (Australia) M Polmans	4	4
4/PR	(United Kingdom) B Klein (Canada) P Polansky	6	7^{7}
(Belarus) U Ignatik (Czech Republic) J Šátral	1	6^{4}
WC	(Australia) H Bourchier (Australia) B Mousley	6^{1}	1
(Israel) D Sela (Netherlands) I Sijsling	7^{7}	6
(Colombia) A González (Argentina) R Olivo	0	7^{7}	[7]
2	(Ukraine) D Molchanov (Kazakhstan) A Nedovyesov	6	6^{3}	[10]

Semifinals
(Italy) M Donati (Kazakhstan) A Golubev	2	7^{7}	[12]
4/PR	(United Kingdom) B Klein (Canada) P Polansky	6	6^{4}	[10]
(Israel) D Sela (Netherlands) I Sijsling	3	2
2	(Ukraine) D Molchanov (Kazakhstan) A Nedovyesov	6	6

Final
(Italy) M Donati (Kazakhstan) A Golubev	3	7^{7}	[10]
2	(Ukraine) D Molchanov (Kazakhstan) A Nedovyesov	6	6^{5}	[1]
