= 2015 City of Onkaparinga ATP Challenger – Doubles =

Doubles
- 2015 City of Onkaparinga ATP Challenger

Final
- Champion: (Russia) Andrey Kuznetsov (Kazakhstan) Aleksandr Nedovyesov
- Runner-up: (Australia) Alex Bolt (Australia) Andrew Whittington
- Score: 7–5, 6–4

Events
Singles	Doubles
City of Onkaparinga ATP Challenger	· 2016 →

This was the first edition of the event.

Andrey Kuznetsov and Aleksandr Nedovyesov won the title, defeating Alex Bolt and Andrew Whittington 7–5, 6–4 in the final.

== Seeds ==
1. (Australia) Alex Bolt / (Australia) Andrew Whittington (final)
2. (Thailand) Sanchai Ratiwatana / (Thailand) Sonchat Ratiwatana (first round)
3. (Moldova) Radu Albot / (Ukraine) Denys Molchanov (quarterfinals)
4. (Germany) Philipp Petzschner / (Germany) Tim Puetz (first round)

== Draw ==
=== Key ===
- Q = Qualifier
- WC = Wild card
- LL = Lucky loser
- Alt = Alternate
- SE = Special exempt
- PR = Protected ranking
- ITF = ITF entry
- JE = Junior exempt
- w/o = Walkover
- r = Retired
- d = Defaulted
- SR = Special ranking

First round
1	(Australia) A Bolt (Australia) A Whittington	6	6
(Japan) H Moriya (Japan) Y Nishioka	2	2
WC	(Australia) O Jasika (Australia) M Polmans	6	7^{7}
(United Kingdom) L Broady (South Korea) H Chung	4	6^{1}
3	(Moldova) R Albot (Ukraine) D Molchanov	6	7
(Italy) M Viola (Estonia) J Zopp	0	5
WC	(Australia) Jacob Grills (Australia) A Harris	3	4
(Brazil) A Ghem (Austria) G Melzer	6	6
(Belgium) M Authom (Belgium) Y Mertens	6	1	[10]
(France) T Lamasine (France) P-H Mathieu	2	6	[7]
(Russia) A Kuznetsov (Kazakhstan) A Nedovyesov	7^{7}	0	[10]
4	(Germany) P Petzschner (Germany) T Puetz	6^{3}	6	[8]
(China) M Gong (China) Z Zhang	6	6
(United Kingdom) B Klein (Italy) S Travaglia	4	4
WC	(Australia) L Saville (Australia) J Thompson	6^{9}	6	[10]
2	(Thailand) Sa Ratiwatana (Thailand) So Ratiwatana	7^{11}	2	[2]

Quarterfinals
1	(Australia) A Bolt (Australia) A Whittington	6	6
WC	(Australia) O Jasika (Australia) M Polmans	1	4
3	(Moldova) R Albot (Ukraine) D Molchanov	6	2	[6]
(Brazil) A Ghem (Austria) G Melzer	3	6	[10]
(Belgium) M Authom (Belgium) Y Mertens	3	3
(Russia) A Kuznetsov (Kazakhstan) A Nedovyesov	6	6
(China) M Gong (China) Z Zhang	2	3
WC	(Australia) L Saville (Australia) J Thompson	6	6

Semifinals
1	(Australia) A Bolt (Australia) A Whittington	6	2	[13]
(Brazil) A Ghem (Austria) G Melzer	1	6	[11]
(Russia) A Kuznetsov (Kazakhstan) A Nedovyesov	w/o
WC	(Australia) L Saville (Australia) J Thompson

Final
1	(Australia) A Bolt (Australia) A Whittington	5	4
(Russia) A Kuznetsov (Kazakhstan) A Nedovyesov	7	6
