= 2016 City of Onkaparinga ATP Challenger =

- Date: 2–10 January 2016
- Edition: 2nd
- Draw: 32S / 16D
- Prize money: $75,000
- Surface: Hard
- Location: Happy Valley, South Australia, Australia

Champions

Singles
- (United States) Taylor Fritz

Doubles
- (Italy) Matteo Donati / (Kazakhstan) Andrey Golubev
- City of Onkaparinga ATP Challenger

The 2016 City of Onkaparinga ATP Challenger was a professional tennis tournament played on hard courts. It was the second edition of the tournament which was part of the 2016 ATP Challenger Tour. It took place in Happy Valley, South Australia, Australia between 2–10 January 2016.

On 29 December 2015, Tennis South Australia Chief Executive Officer, Steven Baldas confirmed 15 players from inside the world's top 200 would compete, with Israel's Dudi Sela the highest ranked player in the field.

== ATP entrants ==
=== Seeds ===
Country	Player	Rank	Seed
ISR	Dudi Sela	100	1
USA	Bjorn Fratangelo	128	2
COL	Alejandro González	141	3
NED	Igor Sijsling	145	4
KAZ	Aleksandr Nedovyesov	162	5
SLO	Grega Žemlja	172	6
ARG	Renzo Olivo	173	7
USA	Taylor Fritz	174	8

- ^{1} Rankings are as of December 28, 2015.

=== Other entrants ===
The following players received wildcards into the singles main draw:

- (Australia) Matthew Barton
- (Australia) Alex Bolt
- (Australia) Bradley Mousley
- (Australia) Marc Polmans

The following players received entry from the qualifying draw:

- (Australia) Maverick Banes
- (Australia) Dayne Kelly
- (Canada) Peter Polansky
- (Australia) Andrew Whittington

== Champions ==
=== Singles ===
- (United States) Taylor Fritz def. (Israel) Dudi Sela 7–6^{(9–7)}, 6–2

=== Doubles ===
- (Italy) Matteo Donati / (Kazakhstan) Andrey Golubev def. (Ukraine) Denys Molchanov / (Kazakhstan) Aleksandr Nedovyesov 3–6, 7–6^{(7–5)}, [10–1]
