= 2019 Swiss Indoors =

- Date: 21–27 October
- Edition: 50th
- Category: ATP Tour 500
- Draw: 32S / 16D
- Prize money: €2,082,655
- Surface: Hard (indoor)
- Location: Basel, Switzerland
- Venue: St. Jakobshalle

Champions

Singles
- (Switzerland) Roger Federer

Doubles
- (Netherlands) Jean-Julien Rojer / (Romania) Horia Tecău
← 2018 ·	Swiss Indoors	· 2022 →

The 2019 Swiss Indoors was a men's tennis tournament played on indoor hard courts. It was the 50th edition of the tournament, and part of the 500 series of the 2019 ATP Tour. It took place at the St. Jakobshalle in Basel, Switzerland, from 21 October through 27 October 2019. First-seeded Roger Federer won his tenth singles title at the event.

== Finals ==
=== Singles ===
- (Switzerland) Roger Federer defeated (Australia) Alex de Minaur, 6–2, 6–2

=== Doubles ===
- (Netherlands) Jean-Julien Rojer'/ (Romania) Horia Tecău defeated (United States) Taylor Fritz / (United States) Reilly Opelka, 7–5, 6–3

== Singles main-draw entrants ==
=== Seeds ===
Country	Player	Rank^{1}	Seed
SUI	Roger Federer	3	1
GER	Alexander Zverev	6	2
GRE	Stefanos Tsitsipas	7	3
ESP	Roberto Bautista Agut	10	4
ITA	Fabio Fognini	12	5
BEL	David Goffin	14	6
SUI	Stan Wawrinka	18	7
FRA	Benoît Paire	23	8

- Rankings are as of October 14, 2019

=== Other entrants ===
The following players received wildcards into the singles main draw:

- (Romania) Marius Copil
- (Australia) Alex de Minaur
- (Switzerland) Henri Laaksonen

The following player received entry via a special exempt:

- (Serbia) Filip Krajinović

The following players received entry from the qualifying draw:

- (Lithuania) Ričardas Berankis
- (Bolivia) Hugo Dellien
- (Germany) Peter Gojowczyk
- (Australia) Alexei Popyrin

=== Withdrawals ===
During the tournament

- (Switzerland) Stan Wawrinka

== Doubles main-draw entrants ==
=== Seeds ===
Country	Player	Country	Player	Rank^{1}	Seed
ESP	Marcel Granollers	ARG	Horacio Zeballos	12	1
RSA	Raven Klaasen	NZL	Michael Venus	21	2
GER	Kevin Krawietz	GER	Andreas Mies	29	3
CRO	Ivan Dodig	SVK	Filip Polášek	43	4

- Rankings are as of October 14, 2019

=== Other entrants ===
The following pairs received wildcards into the doubles main draw:

- (Switzerland) Sandro Ehrat / (Switzerland) Marc-Andrea Hüsler
- (Switzerland) Luca Margaroli / (Germany) Jan-Lennard Struff

The following pair received entry from the qualifying draw:

- (Mexico) Santiago González / (Pakistan) Aisam-ul-Haq Qureshi
