= UTS 5 =

After a year absence, UTS returned in July 2023 with the fifth edition of the tournament, known as UTS Los Angeles. UTS 5 was held in Los Angeles at the Dignity Health Sports Park between 21 July and 23 July, and was the first edition to be staged outside of Europe. It was the first tournament in a series of three events leading up to the "Grand Final" in December 2023.

"The Tornado" Corentin Moutet was the defending champion, but chose not to participate.

"The Great Wall" Wu Yibing won the event, defeating "The Hotshot" Taylor Fritz 11–16, 7–20, 12–11, 16–9, 2–0.

== Groups ==
=== Group A ===
- "The Hotshot", Taylor Fritz
- "The Great Wall", Wu Yibing
- "El Peque", Diego Schwartzman
- "The Rebel", Benoît Paire (Note: Paire replaced "The King" (Nick Kyrgios) after Kyrgios withdrew before the tournament.)

=== Group B ===
- "Big Foe", Frances Tiafoe
- "The Mountain", Ben Shelton
- "The Bublik Enemy", Alexander Bublik
- "La Monf", Gaël Monfils

== Group Stage ==
=== Group A ===
| | "The Hotshot" (United States) Fritz | "The Great Wall" (China) Wu | "El Peque" (Argentina) Schwartzman | "The Rebel" (France) Paire | RR; W–L | Quarter; W–L | Point; W–L | Standings |
| "The Hotshot" (United States) Taylor Fritz | | 14–18, 12–14, 17–9, 13–11, [2–0] | 18–11, 10–17, 6–19, 19–6, [2–1] | 22–10, 17–11, 19–13 | 3–0 | 9–4 (69%) | 171–140 (55%) | 1 |
| "The Great Wall" (China) Wu Yibing | 18–14, 14–12, 9–17, 11–13, [0–2] | | 20–6, 8–12, 9–18, 19–12, [4–3] | 8–22, 15–14, 12–15, 14–11, [3–2] | 2–1 | 8–7 (53%) | 164–173 (49%) | 2 |
| "El Peque" (Argentina) Diego Schwartzman | 11–18, 17–10, 19–6, 6–19, [2–3] | 6–20, 12–8, 18–9, 12–19, [3–4] | | 13–17, 17–16, 14–13, 13–17, [2–1] | 1–2 | 7–8 (47%) | 165–180 (48%) | 3 |
| "The Rebel" (France) Benoît Paire | 10–22, 11–17, 13–19 | 22–8, 14–15, 15–13, 11–14, [2–3] | 17–13, 16–17, 13–14, 17–13, [1–2] | | 0–3 | 4–9 (31%) | 163–170 (49%) | 4 |

=== Group B ===
| | "Big Foe" (United States) Tiafoe | "The Bublik Enemy" (Kazakhstan) Bublik | "The Mountain" (United States) Shelton | "La Monf" (France) Monfils | RR; W–L | Quarter; W–L | Point; W–L | Standings |
| "Big Foe" (United States) Frances Tiafoe | | 14–19, 11–17, 11–17 | 7–13, 15–8, 15–13, 10–16, [2–1] | 12–13, 11–13, 15–7, 9–10 | 1–2 | 4–8 (33%) | 132–147 (47%) | 4 |
| "The Bublik Enemy" (Kazakhstan) Alexander Bublik | 19–14, 17–11, 17–11 | | 17–16, 14–17, 15–18, 10–20 | 13–18, 14–18, 11–16 | 1–2 | 4–6 (40%) | 147–159 (48%) | 3 |
| "The Mountain" (United States) Ben Shelton | 13–7, 8–15, 13–15, 16–10, [1–2] | 16–17, 17–14, 18–15, 20–10 | | 15–16, 12–13, 17–14, 18–14, [2–0] | 2–1 | 8–6 (57%) | 186–162 (53%) | 2 |
| "La Monf" (France) Gaël Monfils | 13–12, 13–11, 7–15, 10–9 | 18–13, 18–14, 16–11 | 16–15, 13–12, 14–17, 14–18, [0–2] | | 2–1 | 8–4 (67%) | 151–148 (51%) | 1 |

== Finals ==
Semifinals
(United States) Taylor Fritz "The Hotshot" | 18 | 14 | 9 | 18 | 2
(France) Gaël Monfils "La Monf" | 10 | 15 | 18 | 13 | 0
(China) Wu Yibing "The Great Wall" | 17 | 5 | 20 | 17
(United States) Ben Shelton "The Mountain" | 15 | 20 | 15 | 11

Final
(United States) Taylor Fritz "The Hotshot" | 16 | 20 | 11 | 9 | 0
(China) Wu Yibing "The Great Wall" | 11 | 7 | 12 | 16 | 2
