= 2019 Swiss Indoors – Doubles =

Doubles
- 2019 Swiss Indoors

Final
- Champions: (Netherlands) Jean-Julien Rojer (Romania) Horia Tecău
- Runners-up: (United States) Taylor Fritz (United States) Reilly Opelka
- Score: 7–5, 6–3

Details
- Draw: 16
- Seeds: 4

Events
Singles	Doubles
← 2018 ·	Swiss Indoors	· 2022 →

Dominic Inglot and Franko Škugor were the defending champions, but Inglot decided to compete in Vienna instead. Škugor played alongside Nikola Mektić, but they lost to Jean-Julien Rojer and Horia Tecău in the first round.

Rojer and Tecău went on to win the title, defeating Taylor Fritz and Reilly Opelka in the final, 7–5, 6–3.

== Seeds ==
1. (Spain) Marcel Granollers / (Argentina) Horacio Zeballos (quarterfinals)
2. (South Africa) Raven Klaasen / (New Zealand) Michael Venus (quarterfinals)
3. (Germany) Kevin Krawietz / (Germany) Andreas Mies (first round)
4. (Netherlands) Jean-Julien Rojer / (Romania) Horia Tecău (champions)

== Draw ==
=== Key ===
- Q = Qualifier
- WC = Wild card
- LL = Lucky loser
- Alt = Alternate
- SE = Special exempt
- PR = Protected ranking
- ITF = ITF entry
- JE = Junior exempt
- w/o = Walkover
- r = Retired
- d = Defaulted
- SR = Special ranking

=== Draw ===
First round
1	(Spain) M Granollers (Argentina) H Zeballos	6	7^{7}
(France) R Gasquet (France) É Roger-Vasselin	4	6^{3}
(Serbia) D Lajović (Spain) A Ramos Viñolas	3	4
Q	(Mexico) S González (Pakistan) A-u-H Qureshi	6	6
3	(Germany) K Krawietz (Germany) A Mies	6^{2}	4
(France) J Chardy (France) F Martin	7^{7}	6
(Netherlands) W Koolhof (Greece) S Tsitsipas	3	4
(United States) T Fritz (United States) R Opelka	6	6
(United Kingdom) J Murray (United Kingdom) N Skupski	7	6
WC	(Switzerland) S Ehrat (Switzerland) M-A Hüsler	5	3
(Croatia) N Mektić (Croatia) F Škugor	3	7^{9}	[5]
4	(Netherlands) J-J Rojer (Romania) H Tecău	6	6^{7}	[10]
WC	(Switzerland) L Margaroli (Germany) J-L Struff	6^{6}	5
(Croatia) I Dodig (Slovakia) F Polášek	7^{8}	7
(Chile) C Garín (France) B Paire	3	3
2	(South Africa) R Klaasen (New Zealand) M Venus	6	6

Quarterfinals
1	(Spain) M Granollers (Argentina) H Zeballos	6	2	[16]
Q	(Mexico) S González (Pakistan) A-u-H Qureshi	1	6	[18]
(France) J Chardy (France) F Martin	4	4
(United States) T Fritz (United States) R Opelka	6	6
(United Kingdom) J Murray (United Kingdom) N Skupski	6^{7}	5
4	(Netherlands) J-J Rojer (Romania) H Tecău	7^{9}	7
(Croatia) I Dodig (Slovakia) F Polášek	7^{10}	6
2	(South Africa) R Klaasen (New Zealand) M Venus	6^{8}	4

Semifinals
Q	(Mexico) S González (Pakistan) A-u-H Qureshi	4	4
(United States) T Fritz (United States) R Opelka	6	6
4	(Netherlands) J-J Rojer (Romania) H Tecău	6^{3}	7^{7}	[10]
(Croatia) I Dodig (Slovakia) F Polášek	7^{7}	6^{3}	[5]

Final
(United States) T Fritz (United States) R Opelka	5	3
4	(Netherlands) J-J Rojer (Romania) H Tecău	7	6

== Qualifying ==
=== Seeds ===
1. (India) Divij Sharan / (New Zealand) Artem Sitak (qualifying competition)
2. (Mexico) Santiago González / (Pakistan) Aisam-ul-Haq Qureshi (qualified)

=== Qualifiers ===
1. (Mexico) Santiago González / (Pakistan) Aisam-ul-Haq Qureshi

=== Qualifying draw ===
First round
1	(India) Divij Sharan (New Zealand) Artem Sitak	6	6
WC	(Switzerland) Mirko Martinez (Switzerland) Damien Wenger	1	0
(Sweden) Robert Lindstedt (United Kingdom) Jonny O'Mara	6^{5}	6	[3]
2	(Mexico) Santiago González (Pakistan) Aisam-ul-Haq Qureshi	7^{7}	3	[10]

Qualifying competition
1	(India) Divij Sharan (New Zealand) Artem Sitak	3	7	[7]
2	(Mexico) Santiago González (Pakistan) Aisam-ul-Haq Qureshi	6	5	[10]
