= 2019 Laver Cup =

Third edition of the Laver Cup, a men's tennis tournament

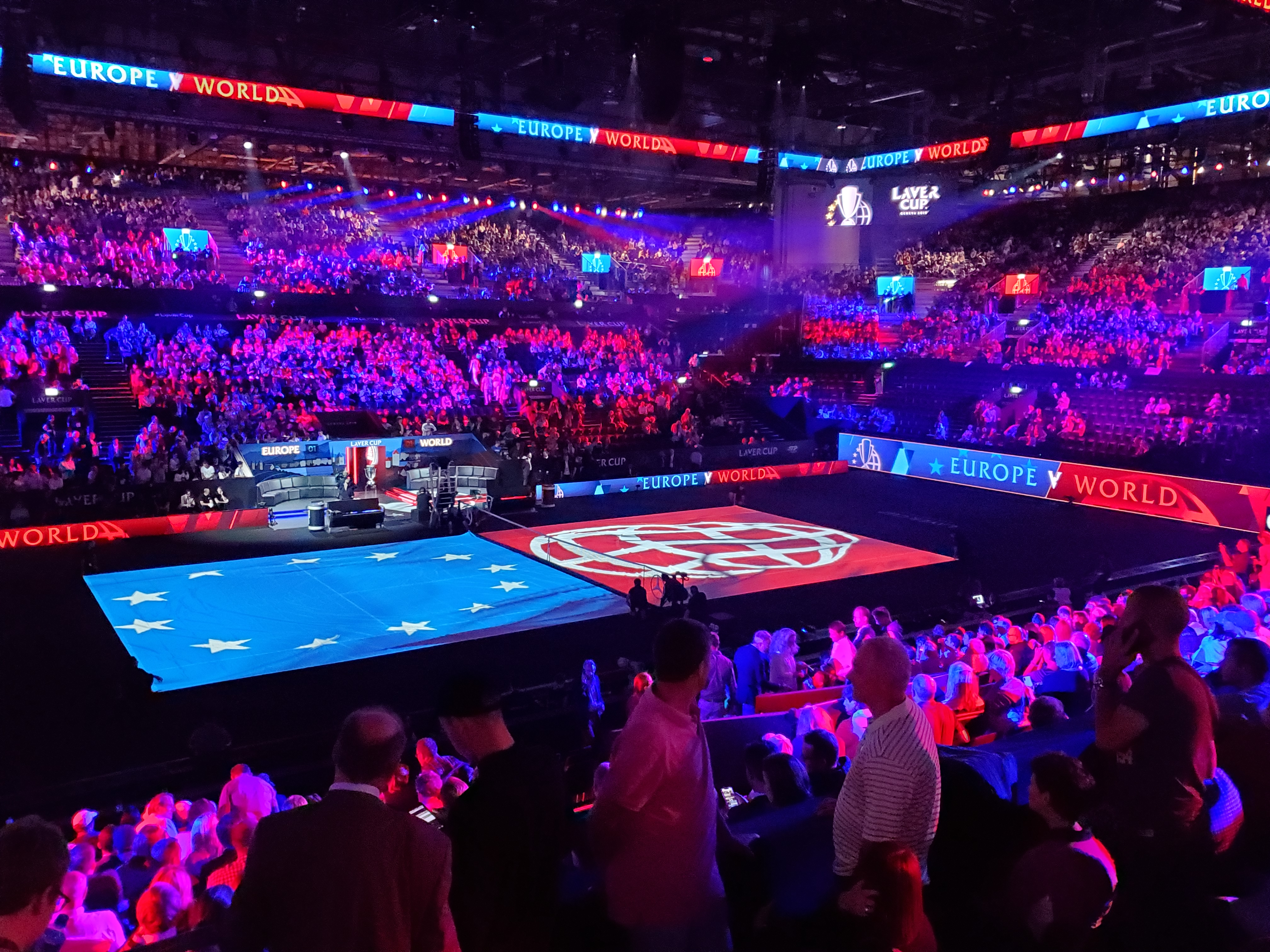
- Date: 20–22 September 2019
- Edition: 3rd
- Surface: Hard indoor
- Location: Geneva, Switzerland
- Venue: Palexpo

Champions
- Team Europe; 13 – 11
- Laver Cup

The 2019 Laver Cup was the third edition of the Laver Cup, a men's tennis tournament between teams from Europe and the rest of the world. It was held on indoor hard courts at the Palexpo in Geneva, Switzerland from 20 until 22 September.

Team Europe successfully defended their title for a third consecutive year, winning the tournament 13−11.

== Player selection ==
On 13 December 2018, Roger Federer and Rafael Nadal were the first players to confirm their participation for Team Europe. During the 2019 Madrid Open, Stan Wawrinka expressed interest in participating in the event with Federer, but he instead played at the St. Petersburg Open in Russia.

On 14 June 2019, Dominic Thiem, Alexander Zverev and Fabio Fognini announced their participation for Team Europe.

On 3 July 2019, Kevin Anderson, John Isner, Milos Raonic and Denis Shapovalov were announced for Team World.

Stefanos Tsitsipas and Nick Kyrgios were both confirmed for the event on 13 August 2019. As his final picks, Team World captain John McEnroe chose Jack Sock and Taylor Fritz, with Fritz replacing the injured Anderson.

== Prize money ==
The total prize money for the 2019 Laver Cup was $2,250,000 for all 12 participating players.

Each winning team member earned $250,000, which marks no increase in prize money compared to 2018.

Whereas, each of the losing team members earned $125,000 each.

== Participants ==
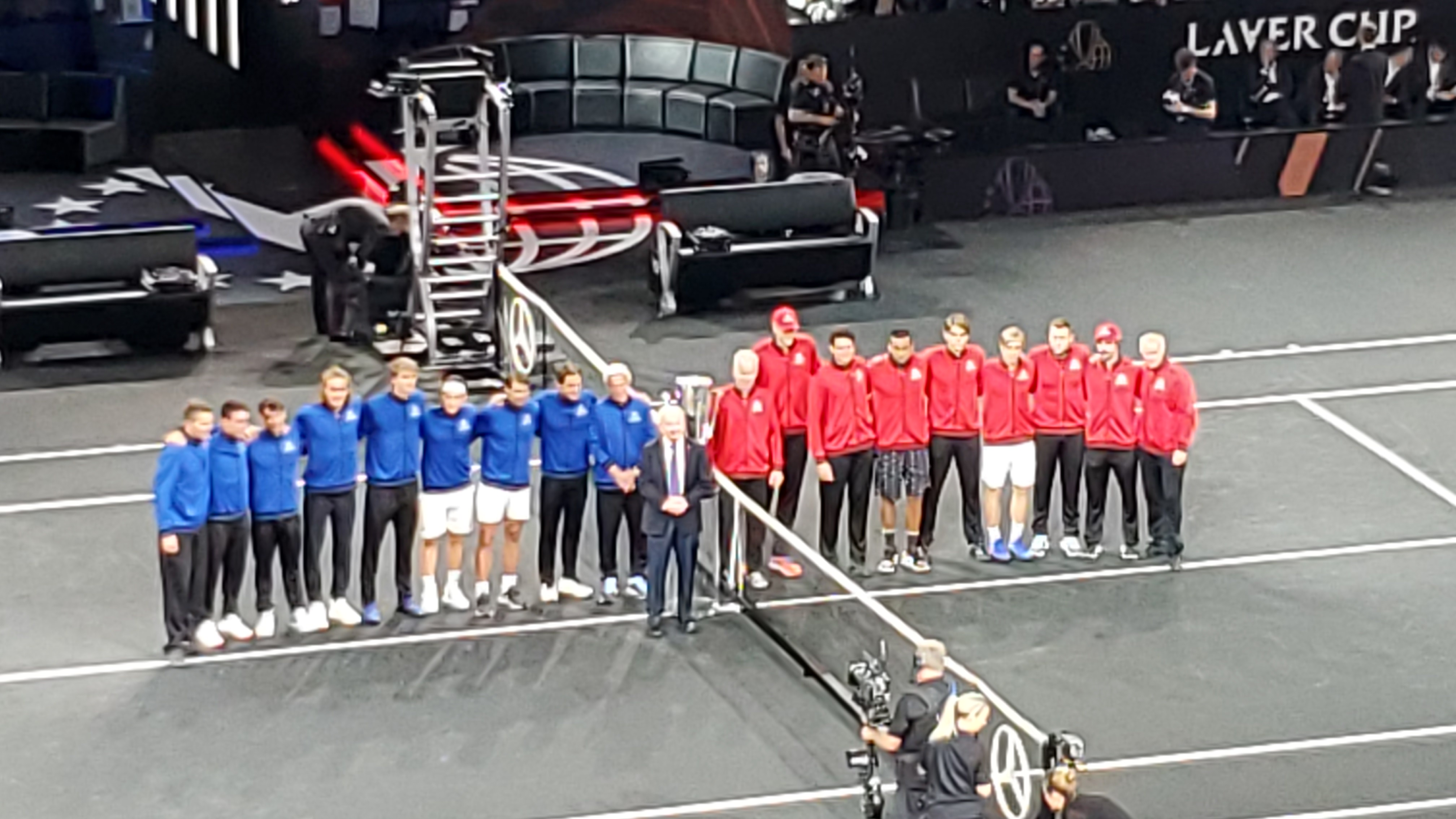
2019 Laver Cup teams, with Team Europe in blue and Team World in red. Opening ceremony with the event's namesake Rod Laver.

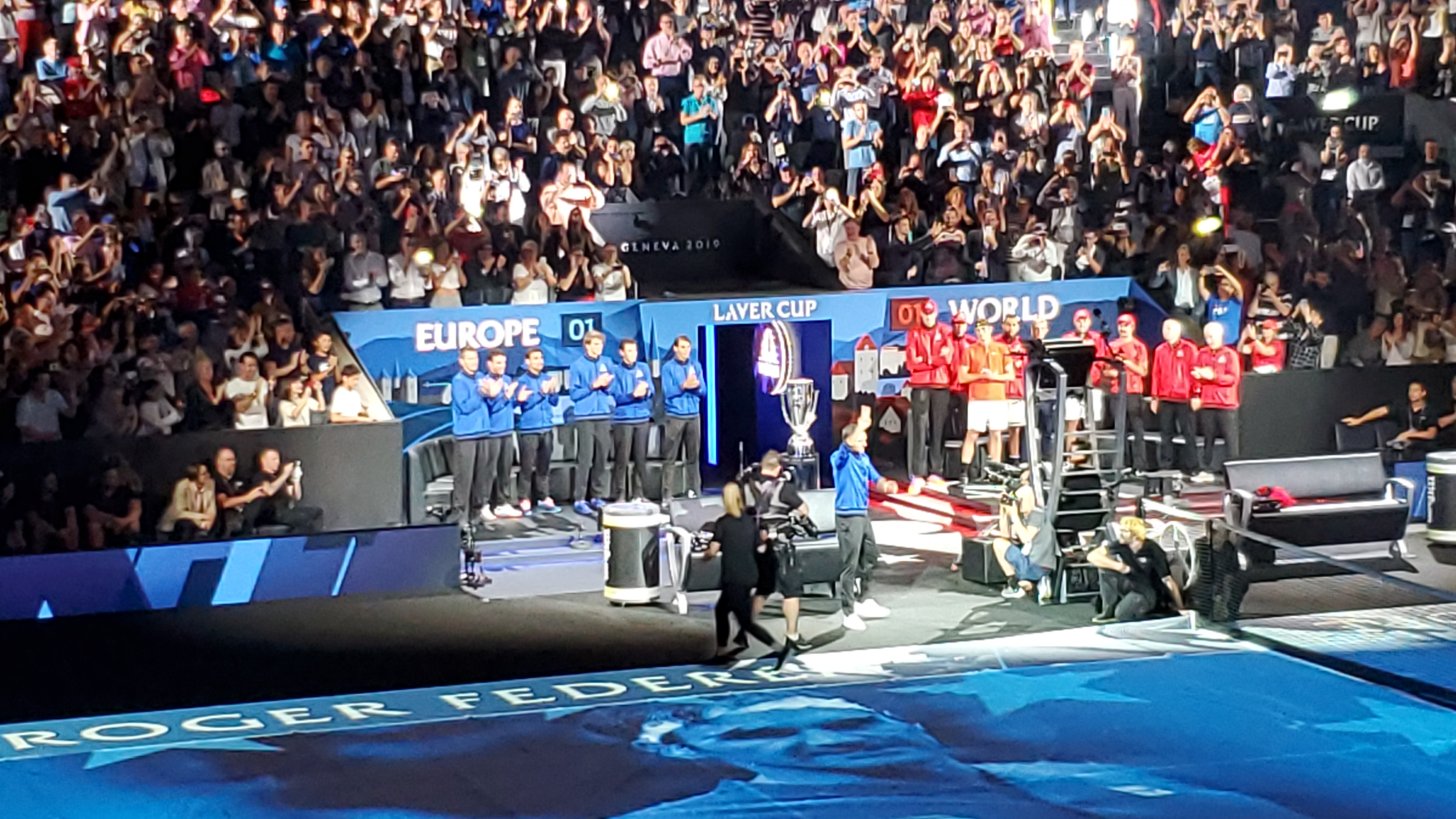
Roger Federer being introduced.

Team Europe
Captain: (Sweden) Björn Borg
Vice-captain: (Sweden) Thomas Enqvist
Player	Rank
(Spain) Rafael Nadal	2
(Switzerland) Roger Federer	3
(Austria) Dominic Thiem	5
(Germany) Alexander Zverev	6
(Greece) Stefanos Tsitsipas	7
(Italy) Fabio Fognini	11
(Spain) Roberto Bautista Agut	10

Team World
Captain: (United States) John McEnroe
Vice-captain: (United States) Patrick McEnroe
Player	Rank
(South Africa) ~~Kevin Anderson~~	18
(United States) John Isner	20
(Canada) Milos Raonic	24
(Australia) Nick Kyrgios	27
(United States) Taylor Fritz	30
(Canada) Denis Shapovalov	33
(United States) Jack Sock	119^{PR(210)}
(Australia) Jordan Thompson	53

Withdrew
Replacement
Alternate

- Singles rankings as of 16 September 2019.
- PR = Protected ranking

== Matches ==
Each match win on day 1 was worth one point, on day 2 two points, and on day 3 three points. The first team to 13 points won.

Day	Date	Match type	Team Europe	Team World	Score	Team points after match
1	20 Sep	Singles	(Austria) Dominic Thiem	(Canada) Denis Shapovalov	6–4, 5–7, [13–11]	1–0
1	20 Sep	Singles	(Italy) Fabio Fognini	(United States) Jack Sock	1–6, 6–7^{(3–7)}	1–1
1	20 Sep	Singles	(Greece) Stefanos Tsitsipas	(United States) Taylor Fritz	6−2, 1−6, [10−7]	2−1
1	20 Sep	Doubles	(Switzerland) R Federer / (Germany) A Zverev	(Canada) D Shapovalov / (United States) J Sock	6−3, 7−5	3−1
2	21 Sep	Singles	(Germany) Alexander Zverev	(United States) John Isner	7−6^{(7−2)}, 4−6, [1−10]	3−3
2	21 Sep	Singles	(Switzerland) Roger Federer	(Australia) Nick Kyrgios	6−7^{(5−7)}, 7−5, [10−7]	5−3
2	21 Sep	Singles	(Spain) Rafael Nadal	(Canada) Milos Raonic	6−3, 7−6^{(7−1)}	7−3
2	21 Sep	Doubles	(Spain) R Nadal / (Greece) S Tsitsipas	(Australia) N Kyrgios / (United States) J Sock	4−6, 6−3, [6−10]	7−5
3	22 Sep	Doubles	(Switzerland) R Federer / (Greece) S Tsitsipas	(United States) J Isner / (United States) J Sock	7−5, 4−6, [8−10]	7−8
3	22 Sep	Singles	(Austria) Dominic Thiem	(United States) Taylor Fritz	5−7, 7−6^{(7−3)}, [5−10]	7−11
3	22 Sep	Singles	(Switzerland) Roger Federer	(United States) John Isner	6−4, 7−6^{(7−3)}	10−11
3	22 Sep	Singles	(Germany) Alexander Zverev	(Canada) Milos Raonic	6−4, 3−6, [10−4]	13−11

== Player statistics ==
Player	Team	Nat.	Matches	Matches win–loss			Points win–loss		
Player	Team	Nat.	Matches	Singles	Doubles	Total	Singles	Doubles	Total
Roger Federer	Europe	(Switzerland)	4	2–0	1–1	3–1	5–0	1–3	6–3
Fabio Fognini	Europe	(Italy)	1	0–1	0–0	0–1	0–1	0–0	0–1
Taylor Fritz	World	(United States)	2	1–1	0–0	1–1	3–1	0–0	3–1
John Isner	World	(United States)	3	1–1	1–0	2–1	2–3	3–0	5–3
Nick Kyrgios	World	(Australia)	2	0–1	1–0	1–1	0–2	2–0	2–2
Rafael Nadal	Europe	(Spain)	2	1–0	0–1	1–1	2–0	0–2	2–2
Milos Raonic	World	(Canada)	2	0–2	0–0	0–2	0–5	0–0	0–5
Denis Shapovalov	World	(Canada)	2	0–1	0–1	0–2	0–1	0–1	0–2
Jack Sock	World	(United States)	4	1–0	2–1	3–1	1–0	5–1	6–1
Dominic Thiem	Europe	(Austria)	2	1–1	0–0	1–1	1–3	0–0	1–3
Stefanos Tsitsipas	Europe	(Greece)	3	1–0	0–2	1–2	1–0	0–5	1–5
Alexander Zverev	Europe	(Germany)	3	1–1	1–0	2–1	3–2	1–0	4–2
