= City of Onkaparinga ATP Challenger =

- 2016 City of Onkaparinga ATP Challenger

ATP Challenger Tour
- Event name: City of Onkaparinga ATP Challenger
- Location: Happy Valley, South Australia, Australia
- Venue: Happy Valley Tennis Club
- Category: ATP Challenger Tour
- Surface: Hard
- Draw: 32S/32Q/16D
- Prize money: €75,000
- Website: Website

The City of Onkaparinga ATP Challenger is a professional tennis tournament played on outdoor hard courts from years 2015-2017. It was part of the ATP Challenger Tour and held annually at the Happy Valley Tennis Club in Happy Valley, South Australia, Australia.

== Past finals ==
=== Singles ===
Year	Champion	Runner-up	Score
2015	(United States) Ryan Harrison	(Cyprus) Marcos Baghdatis	7–6^{(10–8)}, 6–4
2016	(United States) Taylor Fritz	(Israel) Dudi Sela	7–6^{(9–7)}, 6–2
2017	(Germany) Peter Gojowczyk	(Australia) Omar Jasika	6–3, 6–1

=== Doubles ===
Year	Champions	Runners-up	Score
2015	(Russia) Andrey Kuznetsov (Kazakhstan) Aleksandr Nedovyesov	(Australia) Alex Bolt (Australia) Andrew Whittington	7–5, 6–4
2016	(Italy) Matteo Donati (Kazakhstan) Andrey Golubev	(Ukraine) Denys Molchanov (Kazakhstan) Aleksandr Nedovyesov	3–6, 7–6^{(7–5)}, [10–1]
2017	(Chile) Hans Podlipnik (United States) Max Schnur	(Australia) Steven de Waard (Australia) Marc Polmans	7–6^{(7–5)}, 4–6, [10–6]
