= 2016 City of Onkaparinga ATP Challenger – Singles =

Singles
- 2016 City of Onkaparinga ATP Challenger

Final
- Champion: (United States) Taylor Fritz
- Runner-up: (Israel) Dudi Sela
- Score: 7–6^{(9–7)}, 6–2

Events
Singles	Doubles
- City of Onkaparinga ATP Challenger

Ryan Harrison was the defending champion, but elected not to defend his title.
Teenager Taylor Fritz won his third ATP Challenger Tour title, beating top seed Dudi Sela 7–6^{(9–7)}, 6–2

== Seeds ==
1. (Israel) Dudi Sela (final)
2. (United States) Bjorn Fratangelo (first round)
3. (Colombia) Alejandro González (first round)
4. (Netherlands) Igor Sijsling (first round)
5. (Kazakhstan) Aleksandr Nedovyesov (first round)
6. (Slovenia) Grega Žemlja (first round)
7. (Argentina) Renzo Olivo (first round)
8. (United States) Taylor Fritz (champion)

== Draw ==
Key

- Q = Qualifier
- WC = Wild card
- LL = Lucky loser
- Alt = Alternate
- ITF = ITF entry
- PR = Protected ranking
- SR = Special ranking
- SE = Special exempt
- JE = Junior exempt
- JR = Junior Accelerator Programme entrant
- CO = College Accelerator Programme entrant
- NG = Next Gen Accelerator Program entrant
- w/o = Walkover
- r = Retired
- d = Defaulted

=== Finals ===
Semifinals
1	(Israel) Dudi Sela	6	6^{2}	7^{7}
(Hungary) Márton Fucsovics	2	7^{7}	6^{4}
8	(United States) Taylor Fritz	6	6
Q	(Australia) Andrew Whittington	0	2

Final
1	(Israel) Dudi Sela	6^{7}	2
8	(United States) Taylor Fritz	7^{9}	6

=== Top half ===
First round
1	(Israel) D Sela	6	7^{7}
(Belarus) U Ignatik	4	6^{4}
Q	(Australia) D Kelly	7	6
(United Kingdom) D Evans	5	4
Q	(Canada) P Polansky	7^{7}	5	6
(United States) F Tiafoe	6^{4}	7	4
(Czech Republic) J Šátral	6	5	6
5	(Kazakhstan) A Nedovyesov	3	7	3
4	(Netherlands) I Sijsling	6	1	4
(Japan) H Moriya	3	6	6
(Kazakhstan) A Golubev	7^{9}	7
(United Kingdom) B Klein	6^{7}	5
(Hungary) M Fucsovics	6	6
(Italy) M Donati	4	4
Q	(Australia) M Banes	6	7^{7}
6	(Slovenia) G Žemlja	4	6^{3}

Second round
1	(Israel) D Sela	6	6
Q	(Australia) D Kelly	3	1
Q	(Canada) P Polansky	5	1
(Czech Republic) J Šátral	7	6
(Japan) H Moriya	4	6	6
(Kazakhstan) A Golubev	6	3	2
(Hungary) M Fucsovics	6	6
Q	(Australia) M Banes	1	4

Quarterfinals
1	(Israel) D Sela	6	6
(Czech Republic) J Šátral	1	0
(Japan) H Moriya	0	3
(Hungary) M Fucsovics	6	6

Semifinals
1	(Israel) D Sela	6	6^{2}	7^{7}
(Hungary) M Fucsovics	2	7^{7}	6^{4}

=== Bottom half ===
First round
8	(United States) T Fritz	6	6
WC	(Australia) M Polmans	2	2
(United States) A Sarkissian	7^{7}	2	6
(Germany) P Gojowczyk	6^{4}	6	1
WC	(Australia) M Barton	5	3
(Germany) N Langer	7	6
WC	(Australia) A Bolt	6	6
3	(Colombia) A González	3	4
7	(Argentina) R Olivo	5	6^{0}
(Austria) D Novak	7	7^{7}
(United States) D Nguyen	6^{5}	1
(Bosnia and Herzegovina) A Šetkić	7^{7}	6
WC	(Australia) B Mousley	7	7
(Serbia) L Đere	5	5
Q	(Australia) A Whittington	6	3	6
2	(United States) B Fratangelo	3	6	3

Second round
8	(United States) T Fritz	6	6^{0}	7^{7}
(United States) A Sarkissian	3	7^{7}	6^{5}
(Germany) N Langer	3	2
WC	(Australia) A Bolt	6	6
(Austria) D Novak	6	6
(Bosnia and Herzegovina) A Šetkić	4	4
WC	(Australia) B Mousley	5	3
Q	(Australia) A Whittington	7	6

Quarterfinals
8	(United States) T Fritz	7^{7}	6
WC	(Australia) A Bolt	6^{5}	4
(Austria) D Novak	3	3
Q	(Australia) A Whittington	6	6

Semifinals
8	(United States) T Fritz	6	6
Q	(Australia) A Whittington	0	2
