= 2019 Swiss Indoors – Singles =

Singles
- 2019 Swiss Indoors

Final
- Champion: (Switzerland) Roger Federer
- Runner-up: (Australia) Alex de Minaur
- Score: 6–2, 6–2

Details
- Draw: 32 (4 Q / 3 WC )
- Seeds: 8

Events
| Singles | Doubles |
- Swiss Indoors

Two-time defending champion Roger Federer defeated Alex de Minaur in the final, 6–2, 6–2 to win the singles tennis title at the 2019 Swiss Indoors. He did not drop a set en route to his 103rd and final ATP Tour singles title. It was his tenth Swiss Indoors title, making Federer the first player in ATP history to win ten titles at tournaments on two different surfaces (alongside Halle, played on grass).

== Seeds ==
1. (Switzerland) Roger Federer (champion)
2. (Germany) Alexander Zverev (first round)
3. (Greece) Stefanos Tsitsipas (semifinals)
4. (Spain) Roberto Bautista Agut (quarterfinals)
5. (Italy) Fabio Fognini (second round)
6. (Belgium) David Goffin (second round)
7. (Switzerland) Stan Wawrinka (quarterfinals, withdrew)
8. (France) Benoît Paire (first round)

== Draw ==
Key

- Q = Qualifier
- WC = Wild card
- LL = Lucky loser
- Alt = Alternate
- ITF = ITF entry
- PR = Protected ranking
- SR = Special ranking
- SE = Special exempt
- JE = Junior exempt
- JR = Junior Accelerator Programme entrant
- CO = College Accelerator Programme entrant
- NG = Next Gen Accelerator Program entrant
- w/o = Walkover
- r = Retired
- d = Defaulted

=== Finals ===
Semifinals
1 | (Switzerland) Roger Federer | 6 | 6
3 | (Greece) Stefanos Tsitsipas | 4 | 4
(United States) Reilly Opelka | 6^{2} | 7^{7} | 6^{3}
WC | (Australia) Alex de Minaur | 7^{7} | 6^{4} | 7^{7}

Final
1 | (Switzerland) Roger Federer | 6 | 6
WC | (Australia) Alex de Minaur | 2 | 2

=== Top half ===
First round
1 | (Switzerland) R Federer | 6 | 6
Q | (Germany) P Gojowczyk | 2 | 1
(Moldova) R Albot | 2 | 6 | 6
(Serbia) D Lajović | 6 | 3 | 4
(United States) F Tiafoe | 6 | 6
(United Kingdom) D Evans | 4 | 2
(Uruguay) P Cuevas | 3 | 4
7 | (Switzerland) S Wawrinka | 6 | 6
3 | (Greece) S Tsitsipas | 6 | 7^{8}
(Spain) A Ramos Viñolas | 3 | 6^{6}
Q | (Lithuania) R Berankis | 6 | 6
(Spain) P Andújar | 1 | 1
(Serbia) L Đere | 1 | 4
SE | (Serbia) F Krajinović | 6 | 6
Q | (Australia) A Popyrin | 2 | 4
5 | (Italy) F Fognini | 6 | 6

Second round
1 | (Switzerland) R Federer | 6 | 6
(Moldova) R Albot | 0 | 3
(United States) F Tiafoe | 3 | 6 | 5
7 | (Switzerland) S Wawrinka | 6 | 3 | 7
3 | (Greece) S Tsitsipas | 6^{4} | 6 | 6
Q | (Lithuania) R Berankis | 7^{7} | 2 | 4
SE | (Serbia) F Krajinović | 6 | 6
5 | (Italy) F Fognini | 2 | 4

Quarterfinals
1 | (Switzerland) R Federer | w/o
7 | (Switzerland) S Wawrinka
3 | (Greece) S Tsitsipas | 3 | 6 | 6
SE | (Serbia) F Krajinović | 6 | 4 | 4

Semifinals
1 | (Switzerland) R Federer | 6 | 6
3 | (Greece) S Tsitsipas | 4 | 4

=== Bottom half ===
First round
6 | (Belgium) D Goffin | 6 | 6
(Croatia) M Čilić | 4 | 4
(Chile) C Garín | 6^{5} | 6^{10}
(United States) R Opelka | 7^{7} | 7^{12}
(Argentina) JI Londero | 1 | 6^{4}
(France) R Gasquet | 6 | 7^{7}
WC | (Romania) M Copil | 4 | 5
4 | (Spain) R Bautista Agut | 6 | 7
8 | (France) B Paire | 3 | 5
WC | (Switzerland) H Laaksonen | 6 | 7
(Germany) J-L Struff | 6 | 6
(Serbia) M Kecmanović | 4 | 2
WC | (Australia) A de Minaur | 6 | 7
Q | (Bolivia) H Dellien | 1 | 5
(United States) T Fritz | 7^{9} | 6
2 | (Germany) A Zverev | 6^{7} | 4

Second round
6 | (Belgium) D Goffin | 7^{7} | 6^{4} | 5
(United States) R Opelka | 6^{4} | 7^{7} | 7
(France) R Gasquet | 2 | 6 | 3
4 | (Spain) R Bautista Agut | 6 | 4 | 6
WC | (Switzerland) H Laaksonen | 3 | 4
(Germany) J-L Struff | 6 | 6
WC | (Australia) A de Minaur | 6 | 6
(United States) T Fritz | 3 | 3

Quarterfinals
(United States) R Opelka | 6 | 3 | 6
4 | (Spain) R Bautista Agut | 3 | 6 | 3
(Germany) J-L Struff | 4 | 6^{4}
WC | (Australia) A de Minaur | 6 | 7^{7}

Semifinals
(United States) R Opelka | 6^{2} | 7^{7} | 6^{3}
WC | (Australia) A de Minaur | 7^{7} | 6^{4} | 7^{7}

== Qualifying ==
=== Seeds ===
1. (Norway) Casper Ruud (qualifying competition)
2. (Portugal) João Sousa (first round)
3. (Lithuania) Ričardas Berankis (qualified)
4. (Japan) Yoshihito Nishioka (qualifying competition)
5. (Bolivia) Hugo Dellien (qualified)
6. (France) Grégoire Barrère (qualifying competition, withdrew)
7. (Croatia) Ivo Karlović (first round)
8. (South Korea) Kwon Soon-woo (qualifying competition)

=== Qualifiers ===
1. (Germany) Peter Gojowczyk
2. (Australia) Alexei Popyrin
3. (Lithuania) Ričardas Berankis
4. (Bolivia) Hugo Dellien

=== Qualifying draw ===
==== First qualifier ====
First round
1 | (Norway) Casper Ruud | 6 | 6
WC | (Belgium) Kimmer Coppejans | 3 | 4
(Germany) Peter Gojowczyk | 6 | 6
7 | (Croatia) Ivo Karlović | 2 | 4

Qualifying competition
1 | (Norway) Casper Ruud | 1 | 1
(Germany) Peter Gojowczyk | 6 | 6

==== Second qualifier ====
First round
2 | (Portugal) João Sousa | 1 | 4
(Australia) Alexei Popyrin | 6 | 6
WC | (Switzerland) Marc-Andrea Hüsler | 6 | 3 | 3
8 | (South Korea) Kwon Soon-woo | 4 | 6 | 6

Qualifying competition
(Australia) Alexei Popyrin | 4 | 6 | 6
8 | (South Korea) Kwon Soon-woo | 6 | 3 | 4

==== Third qualifier ====
First round
3 | (Lithuania) Ričardas Berankis | 3 | 6 | 6
Alt | (Monaco) Hugo Nys | 6 | 1 | 2
(Czech Republic) Lukáš Rosol | 2 | 3
6 | (France) Grégoire Barrère | 6 | 6

Qualifying competition
3 | (Lithuania) Ričardas Berankis | w/o
6 | (France) Grégoire Barrère

==== Fourth qualifier ====
First round
4 | (Japan) Yoshihito Nishioka | 6 | 6
(Hungary) Attila Balázs | 3 | 2
WC | (Switzerland) Sandro Ehrat | 6^{5} | 6 | 4
5 | (Bolivia) Hugo Dellien | 7^{7} | 2 | 6

Qualifying competition
4 | (Japan) Yoshihito Nishioka | 5 | 2
5 | (Bolivia) Hugo Dellien | 7 | 6
