= 2020 ATP Finals =

Tennis tournament

- Date: 15–22 November
- Edition: 51st (singles) / 46th (doubles)
- Category: ATP Finals
- Draw: 8S / 8D
- Surface: Hard / indoor
- Location: London, United Kingdom
- Venue: The O_{2} Arena

Champions

Singles
- (Russia) Daniil Medvedev

Doubles
- (Netherlands) Wesley Koolhof / (Croatia) Nikola Mektić
- ATP Finals

The 2020 ATP Finals (also known as the 2020 Nitto ATP Finals for Nitto sponsorship) was a men's tennis year-end tournament played at the O_{2} Arena in London, United Kingdom, from 15 to 22 November 2020. It was the season-ending event for the highest-ranked singles players and doubles teams on the 2020 ATP Tour. This was the final year that London hosted the event. On 14 August 2020, it was announced the tournament would be held without spectators in attendance following guidelines imposed due to the COVID-19 pandemic in the United Kingdom.

The tournament took place from 15 to 22 November at the O_{2} Arena in London, United Kingdom. It was the 51st edition of the tournament (46th in doubles). The tournament was run by the Association of Tennis Professionals (ATP) and was part of the 2020 ATP Tour. The event took place on indoor hard courts. It served as the season-ending championships for players on the ATP Tour.

In singles (and in doubles with teams in place of individual players), the eight players who qualified for the event were split into two groups of four. During this stage, players competed in a round-robin format. The two players in each group with the best results, including head-to-head records, progressed to the semifinals, where the winners of a group faced the runners-up of the other group. This stage, however, was a knock-out stage.

== Finals ==
=== Singles ===
(Russia) Daniil Medvedev defeated (Austria) Dominic Thiem, 4–6, 7–6^{(7–2)}, 6–4.

=== Doubles ===
(Netherlands) Wesley Koolhof / (Croatia) Nikola Mektić defeated (Austria) Jürgen Melzer / (France) Édouard Roger-Vasselin 6–2, 3–6, [10–5].

== Day-by-day summaries ==
=== Singles group ===
Group Tokyo 1970	Group London 2020
(Serbia) Novak Djokovic [1]	(Spain) Rafael Nadal [2]
(Russia) Daniil Medvedev [4]	(Austria) Dominic Thiem [3]
(Germany) Alexander Zverev [5]	(Greece) Stefanos Tsitsipas [6]
(Argentina) Diego Schwartzman [8]	(Russia) Andrey Rublev [7]

=== Doubles group ===
Group Bob Bryan	Group Mike Bryan
(Croatia) Mate Pavić / (Brazil) Bruno Soares [1]	(United States) Rajeev Ram / (United Kingdom) Joe Salisbury [2]
(Spain) Marcel Granollers / (Argentina) Horacio Zeballos [4]	(Germany) Kevin Krawietz / (Germany) Andreas Mies [3]
(Australia) John Peers / (New Zealand) Michael Venus [6]	(Netherlands) Wesley Koolhof / (Croatia) Nikola Mektić [5]
(Austria) Jürgen Melzer / (France) Édouard Roger-Vas. [7]	(Poland) Łukasz Kubot / (Brazil) Marcelo Melo [8]

Session	Event	Group / round	Winner	Loser	Score
Day 1 (15 November)
Afternoon	Doubles	Mike Bryan	(Netherlands) Wesley Koolhof / (Croatia) Nikola Mektić [5]	(Germany) Kevin Krawietz / (Germany) Andreas Mies [3]	6–7^{(3–7)}, 7–6^{(7–4)}, [10–7]
Afternoon	Singles	London 2020	(Austria) Dominic Thiem [3]	(Greece) Stefanos Tsitsipas [6]	7–6^{(7–5)}, 4–6, 6–3
Evening	Doubles	Mike Bryan	(United States) Rajeev Ram / (United Kingdom) Joe Salisbury [2]	(Poland) Łukasz Kubot / (Brazil) Marcelo Melo [8]	7–5, 3–6, [10–5]
Evening	Singles	London 2020	(Spain) Rafael Nadal [2]	(Russia) Andrey Rublev [7]	6–3, 6–4
Day 2 (16 November)
Afternoon	Doubles	Bob Bryan	(Spain) Marcel Granollers / (Argentina) Horacio Zeballos [4]	(Australia) John Peers / (New Zealand) Michael Venus [6]	7–6^{(7–2)}, 7–5
Afternoon	Singles	Tokyo 1970	(Serbia) Novak Djokovic [1]	(Argentina) Diego Schwartzman [8]	6–3, 6–2
Evening	Doubles	Bob Bryan	(Croatia) Mate Pavić / (Brazil) Bruno Soares [1]	(Austria) Jürgen Melzer / (France) Édouard Roger-Vas. [7]	6–7^{(6–8)}, 6–1, [10–4]
Evening	Singles	Tokyo 1970	(Russia) Daniil Medvedev [4]	(Germany) Alexander Zverev [5]	6–3, 6–4
Day 3 (17 November)
Afternoon	Doubles	Mike Bryan	(Germany) Kevin Krawietz / (Germany) Andreas Mies [3]	(Poland) Łukasz Kubot / (Brazil) Marcelo Melo [8]	6–2, 7–6^{(7–5)}
Afternoon	Singles	London 2020	(Austria) Dominic Thiem [3]	(Spain) Rafael Nadal [2]	7–6^{(9–7)}, 7–6^{(7–4)}
Evening	Doubles	Mike Bryan	(Netherlands) Wesley Koolhof / (Croatia) Nikola Mektić [5]	(United States) Rajeev Ram / (United Kingdom) Joe Salisbury [2]	7–6^{(7–5)}, 6–0
Evening	Singles	London 2020	(Greece) Stefanos Tsitsipas [6]	(Russia) Andrey Rublev [7]	6–1, 4–6, 7–6^{(8–6)}
Day 4 (18 November)
Afternoon	Doubles	Bob Bryan	(Spain) Marcel Granollers / (Argentina) Horacio Zeballos [4]	(Croatia) Mate Pavić / (Brazil) Bruno Soares [1]	7–6^{(7–4)}, 6–7^{(4–7)}, [10–8]
Afternoon	Singles	Tokyo 1970	(Germany) Alexander Zverev [5]	(Argentina) Diego Schwartzman [8]	6–3, 4–6, 6–3
Evening	Doubles	Bob Bryan	(Austria) Jürgen Melzer / (France) Édouard Roger-Vas. [7]	(Australia) John Peers / (New Zealand) Michael Venus [6]	2–6, 7–6^{(7–4)}, [12–10]
Evening	Singles	Tokyo 1970	(Russia) Daniil Medvedev [4]	(Serbia) Novak Djokovic [1]	6–3, 6–3
Day 5 (19 November)
Afternoon	Doubles	Mike Bryan	(Poland) Łukasz Kubot / (Brazil) Marcelo Melo [8]	(Netherlands) Wesley Koolhof / (Croatia) Nikola Mektić [5]	6–4, 6–7^{(2–7)}, [10–8]
Afternoon	Singles	London 2020	(Russia) Andrey Rublev [7]	(Austria) Dominic Thiem [3]	6–2, 7–5
Evening	Doubles	Mike Bryan	(United States) Rajeev Ram / (United Kingdom) Joe Salisbury [2]	(Germany) Kevin Krawietz / (Germany) Andreas Mies [3]	7–6^{(7–5)}, 6–7^{(4–7)}, [10–4]
Evening	Singles	London 2020	(Spain) Rafael Nadal [2]	(Greece) Stefanos Tsitsipas [6]	6–4, 4–6, 6–2
Day 6 (20 November)
Afternoon	Doubles	Bob Bryan	(Croatia) Mate Pavić / (Brazil) Bruno Soares [1]	(Australia) John Peers / (New Zealand) Michael Venus [6]	6–7^{(2–7)}, 6–3, [10–8]
Afternoon	Singles	Tokyo 1970	(Serbia) Novak Djokovic [1]	(Germany) Alexander Zverev [5]	6–3, 7–6^{(7–4)}
Evening	Doubles	Bob Bryan	(Austria) Jürgen Melzer / (France) Édouard Roger-Vas. [7]	(Spain) Marcel Granollers / (Argentina) Horacio Zeballos [4]	6–6^{(1–0)} retired
Evening	Singles	Tokyo 1970	(Russia) Daniil Medvedev [4]	(Argentina) Diego Schwartzman [8]	6–3, 6–3
Day 7 (21 November)
Afternoon	Doubles	Semifinals	(Netherlands) Wesley Koolhof / (Croatia) Nikola Mektić [5]	(Spain) Marcel Granollers / (Argentina) Horacio Zeballos [4]	6–3, 6–4
Afternoon	Singles	Semifinals	(Austria) Dominic Thiem [3]	(Serbia) Novak Djokovic [1]	7–5, 6–7^{(10–12)}, 7–6^{(7–5)}
Evening	Doubles	Semifinals	(Austria) Jürgen Melzer / (France) Édouard Roger-Vas. [7]	(United States) Rajeev Ram / (United Kingdom) Joe Salisbury [2]	6–7^{(4–7)}, 6–3, [11–9]
Evening	Singles	Semifinals	(Russia) Daniil Medvedev [4]	(Spain) Rafael Nadal [2]	3–6, 7–6^{(7–4)}, 6–3
Day 8 (22 November)
Afternoon	Doubles	Final	(Netherlands) Wesley Koolhof / (Croatia) Nikola Mektić [5]	(Austria) Jürgen Melzer / (France) Édouard Roger-Vas. [7]	6–2, 3–6, [10–5]
Afternoon	Singles	Final	(Russia) Daniil Medvedev [4]	(Austria) Dominic Thiem [3]	4–6, 7–6^{(7–2)}, 6–4

== Format ==
The ATP Finals had a round-robin format, with eight players/teams divided into two groups of four. The eight seeds were determined by the ATP rankings and ATP Doubles Team Rankings on the Monday after the last ATP Tour tournament of the calendar year. All singles matches, including the final, were best of three sets with tie-breaks in each set including the third. All doubles matches were two sets (no ad) and a Match Tie-break.

== Points and prize money ==
The ATP Finals currently (2020) rewards the following points and prize money, per victory:

Stage	Singles	Doubles^{1}	Points
Final win	$550,000	$70,000	RR + 500
Semi-final win	$402,000	$56,000	RR + 400
Round robin win per match	$153,000	$30,000	200
Participation fee	$153,000	$68,500	—N/a
Alternates	$73,000	$25,000	—N/a

- RR is the points or prize money won in the round robin stage.
- ^{1} Prize money for doubles is per team.
- An undefeated champion would earn the maximum 1,500 points, and $1,564,000 in singles or $284,500 in doubles.

== Qualification ==
=== Singles ===
Eight players compete at the tournament, with two named alternates. Players receive places in the following order of precedence:

1. First, the top 7 players in the ATP Race to London on the Monday after the final tournament of the ATP Tour, that is, after the 2020 Sofia Open.
2. Second, up to two 2020 Grand Slam tournament winners ranked anywhere 8th–20th, in ranking order
3. Third, the eighth ranked player in the ATP rankings

In the event of this totaling more than 8 players, those lower down in the selection order become the alternates. If further alternates are needed, these players are selected by the ATP.

Provisional rankings are published weekly as the ATP Race to London, coinciding with the 52-week rolling ATP rankings on the date of selection. Points are accumulated in Grand Slam, ATP Tour and ATP Challenger Tour tournaments from the 52 weeks prior to the selection date, with points from the previous years Tour Finals excluded. Players accrue points across 18 tournaments, usually made up of:

- The 4 Grand Slam tournaments
- The 8 mandatory ATP Masters tournaments
- The best results from any 6 other tournaments that carry ranking points

All players must include the ranking points for mandatory Masters tournaments for which they are on the original acceptance list and for all Grand Slams for which they would be eligible, even if they do not compete (in which case they receive zero points). Furthermore, players who finished 2017 in the world's top 30 are commitment players who must (if not injured) include points for the 8 mandatory Masters tournament regardless of whether they enter, and who must compete in at least 4 ATP 500 tournaments (though the Monte Carlo Masters may count to this total), of which one must take place after the US Open. Zero point scores may also be taken from withdrawals by non-injured players from ATP 500 tournaments according to certain other conditions outlined by the ATP. Beyond these rules, however, a player may substitute his next best tournament result for missed Masters and Grand Slam tournaments.

Players may have their ATP Masters 1000 commitment reduced by one tournament, by reaching each of the following milestones:

1. 600 tour level matches (as of January 1, 2020),
2. 12 years of service,
3. 31 years of age (as of January 1, 2020).

If a player satisfies all three of these conditions, their mandatory ATP Masters 1000 commitment is dropped entirely. Players must be in good standing as defined by the ATP as to avail of the reduced commitment.

The ATP Cup will count as an additional event in a player's rankings breakdown.

=== Doubles ===
Eight teams compete at the tournament, with one named alternates. The eight competing teams receive places according to the same order of precedence as in Singles. The named alternate will be offered first to any unaccepted teams in the selection order, then to the highest ranked unaccepted team, and then to a team selected by the ATP. Points are accumulated in the same competitions as for the Singles tournament. However, for Doubles teams there are no commitment tournaments, so teams are ranked according to their 18 highest points scoring results from any tournaments.

== Qualified players ==
=== Singles ===
#	Players	Points	Date qualified
1	(Serbia) Novak Djokovic	11,630	14 August
2	(Spain) Rafael Nadal	9,450	14 August
3	(Austria) Dominic Thiem	8,325	14 August
4	(Russia) Daniil Medvedev	6,970	14 September
inj.	(Switzerland) Roger Federer	6,230	withdrew
5	(Germany) Alexander Zverev	5,125	12 October
6	(Greece) Stefanos Tsitsipas	4,625	12 October
7	(Russia) Andrey Rublev	3,919	1 November
8	(Argentina) Diego Schwartzman	3,455	6 November

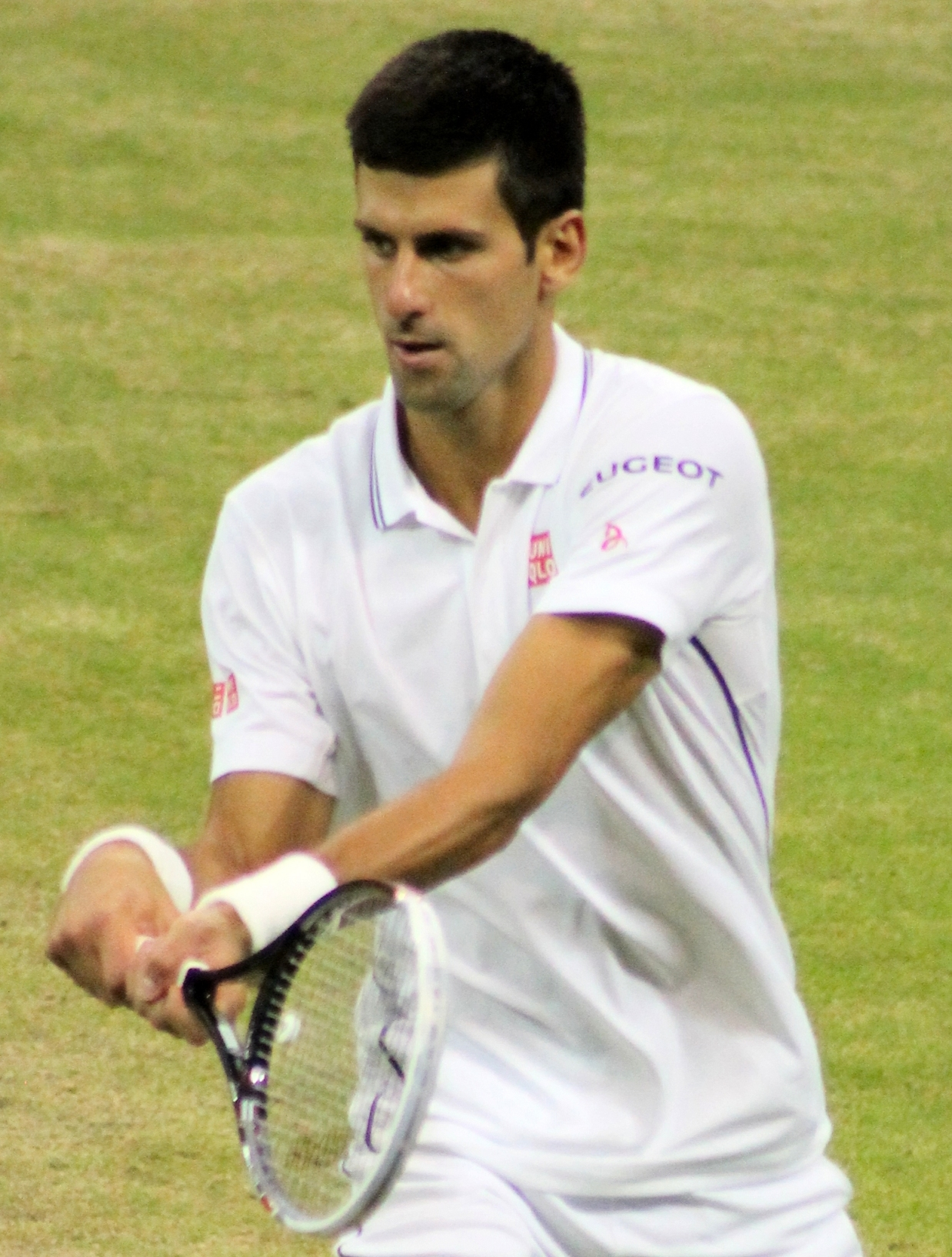
Djokovic

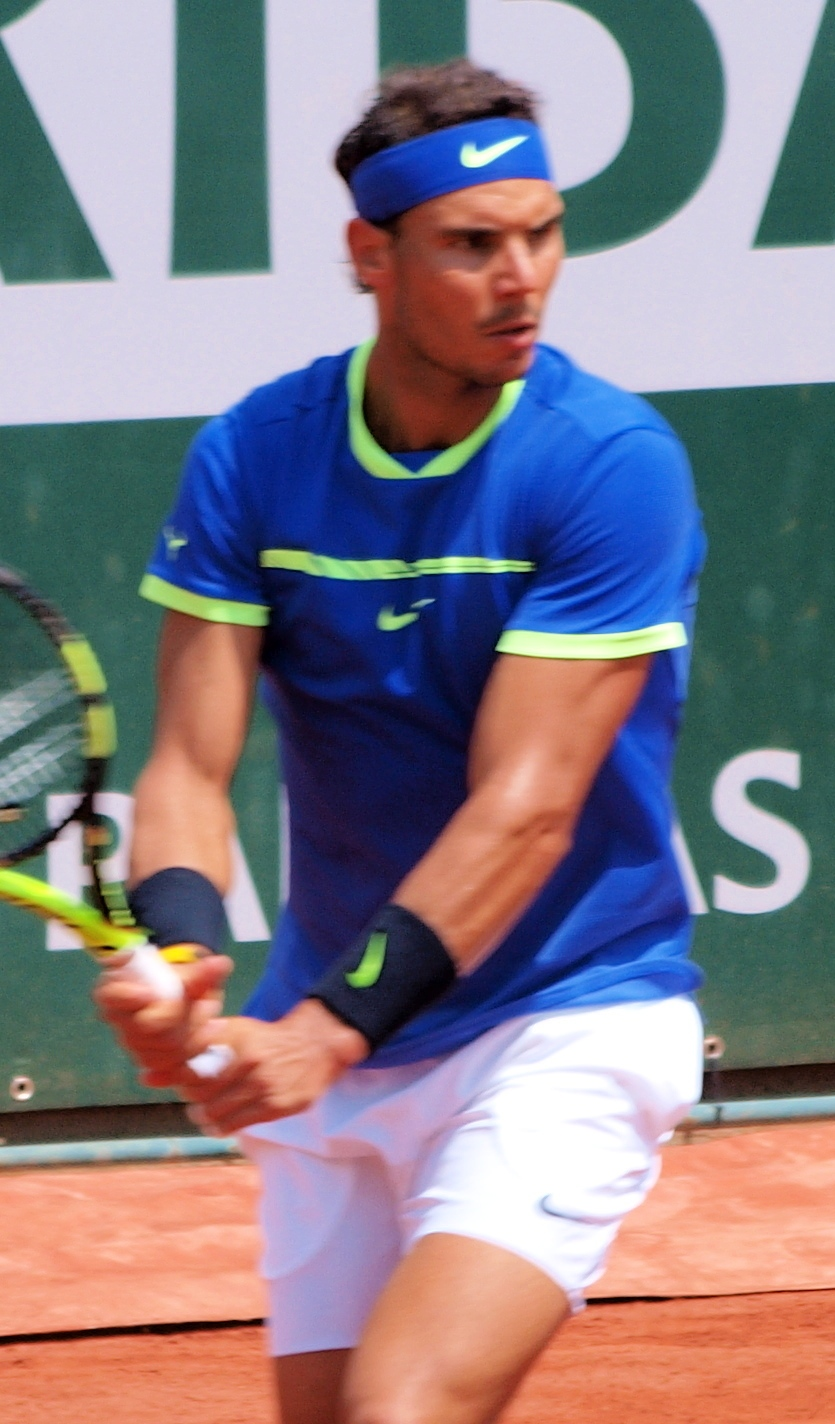
Nadal

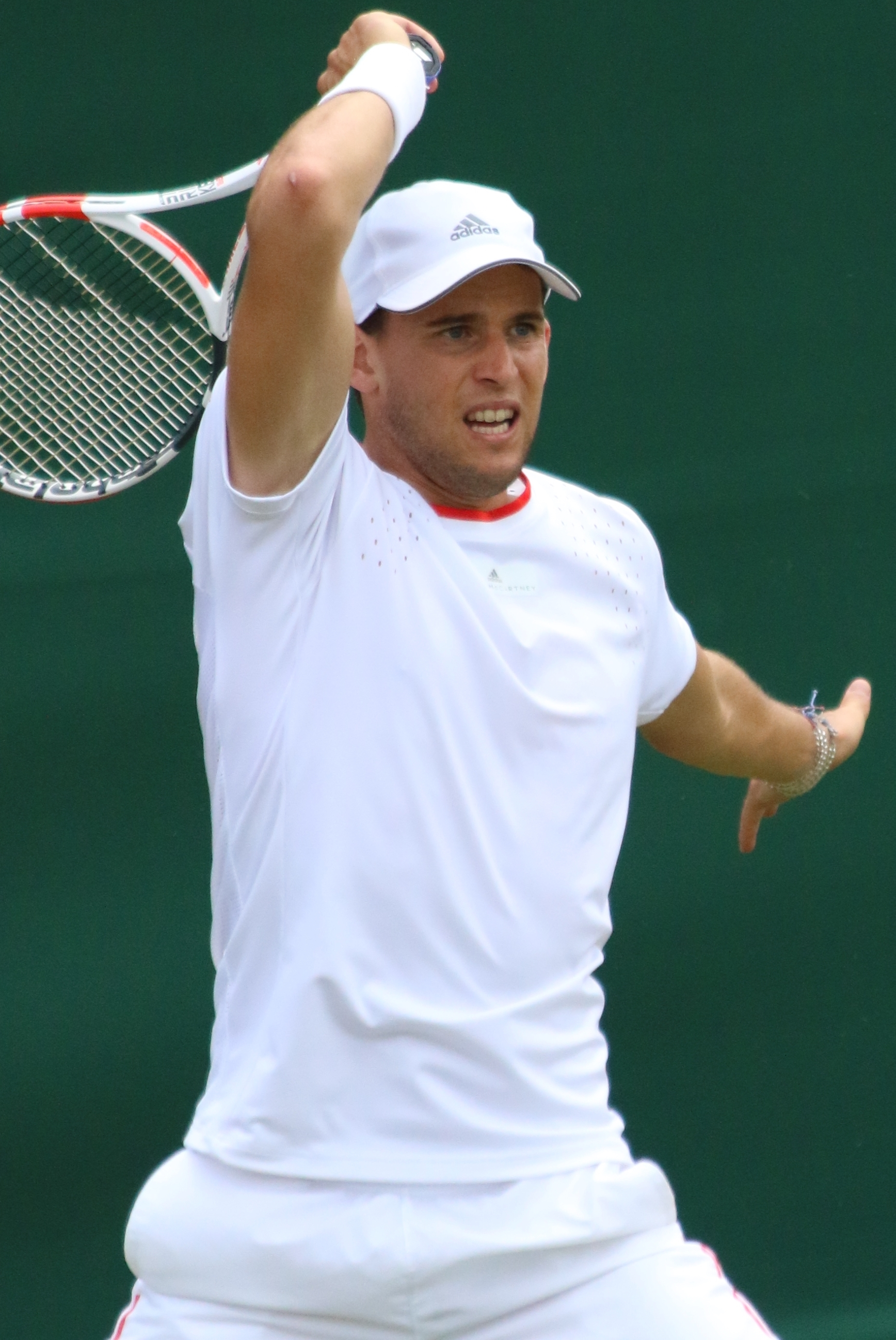
Thiem

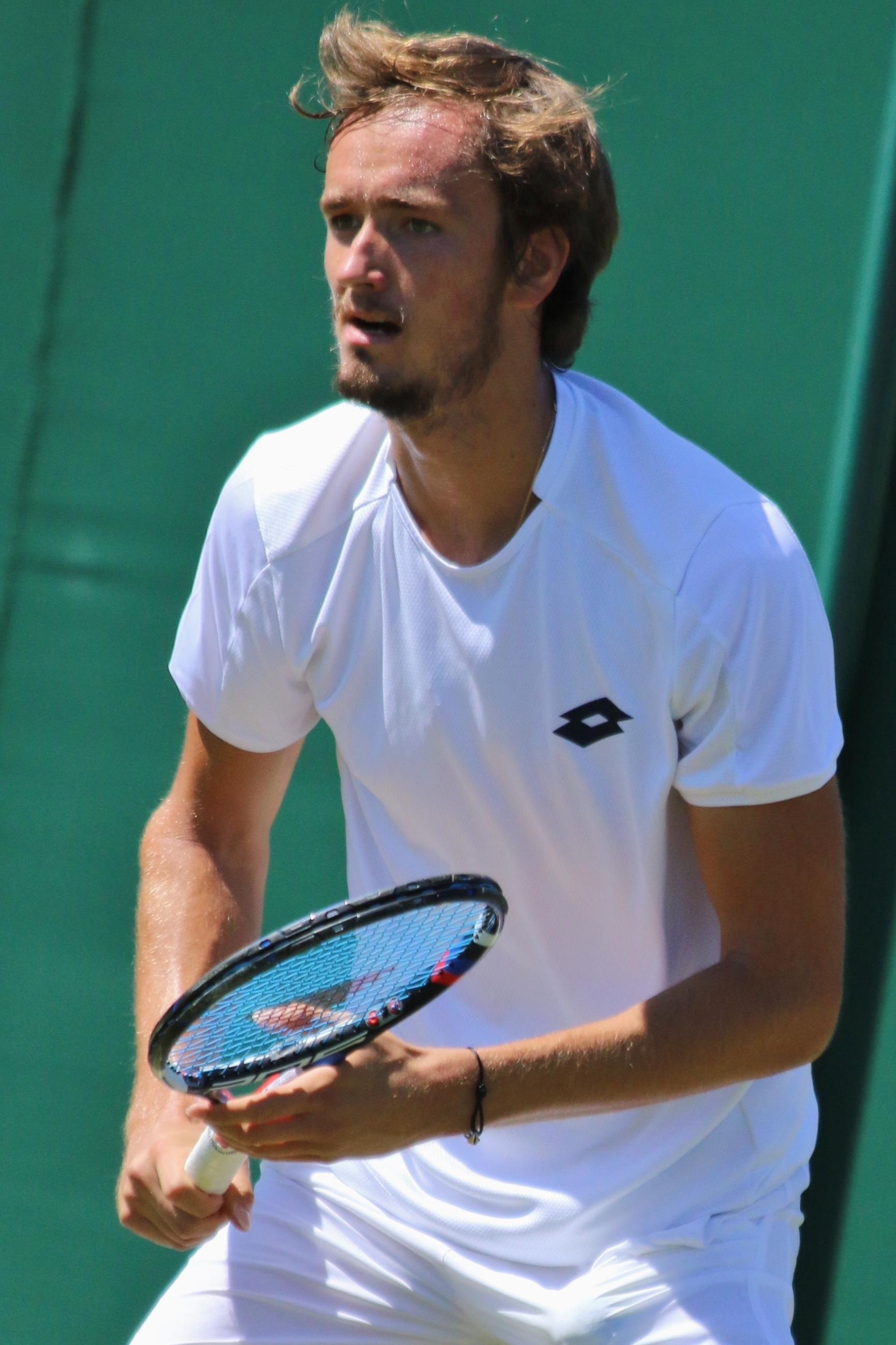
Medvedev

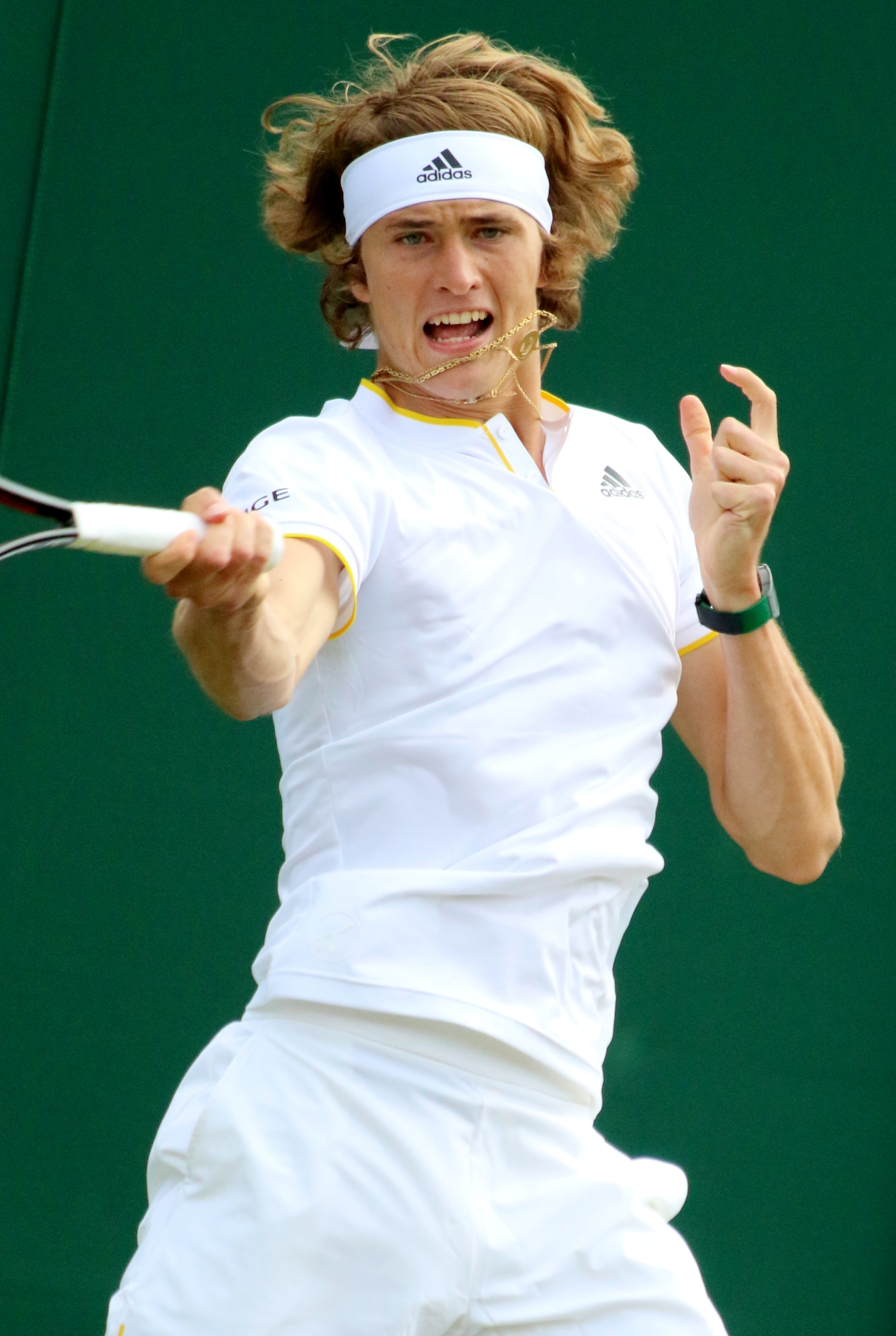
Zverev

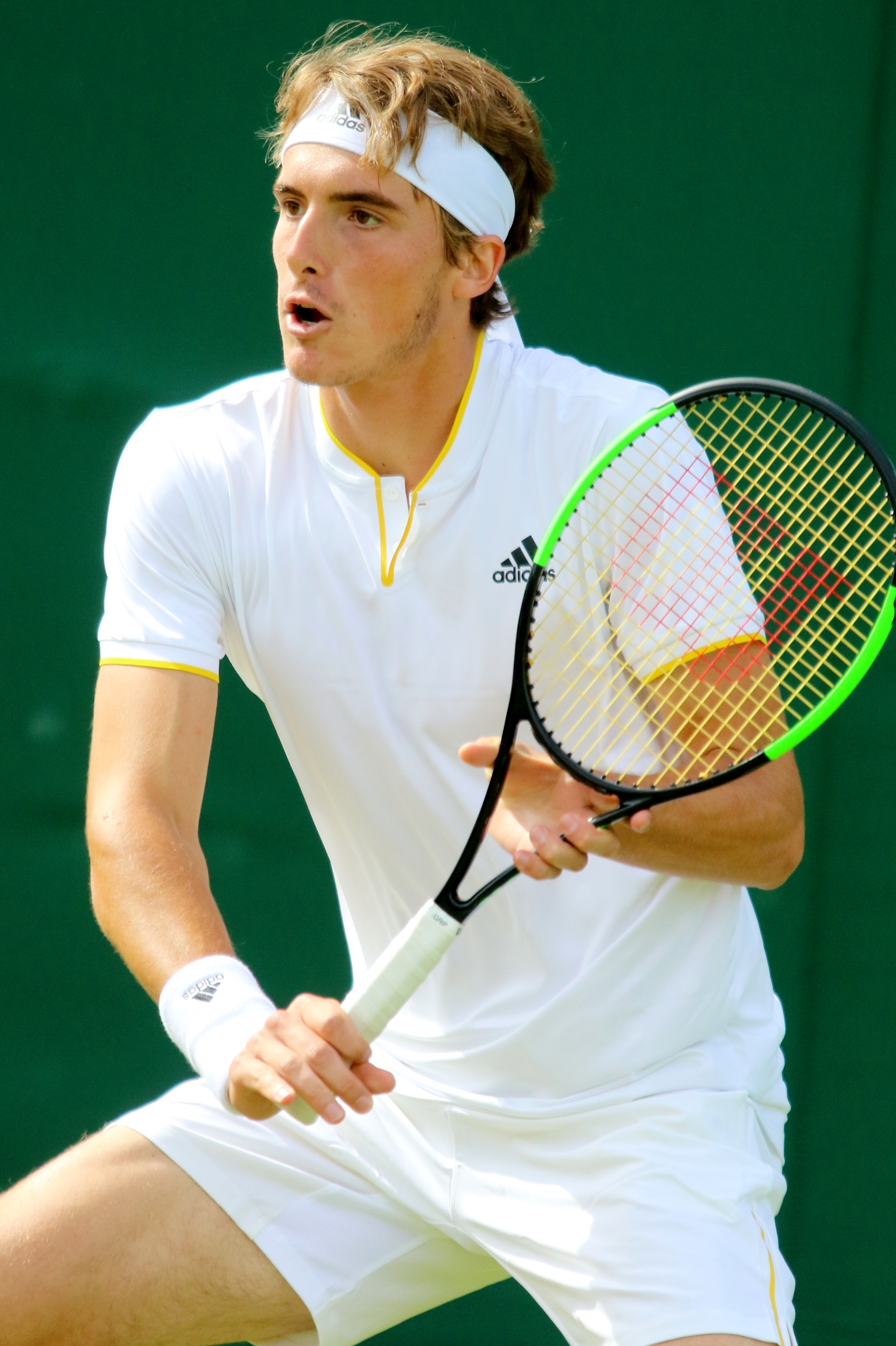
Tsitsipas

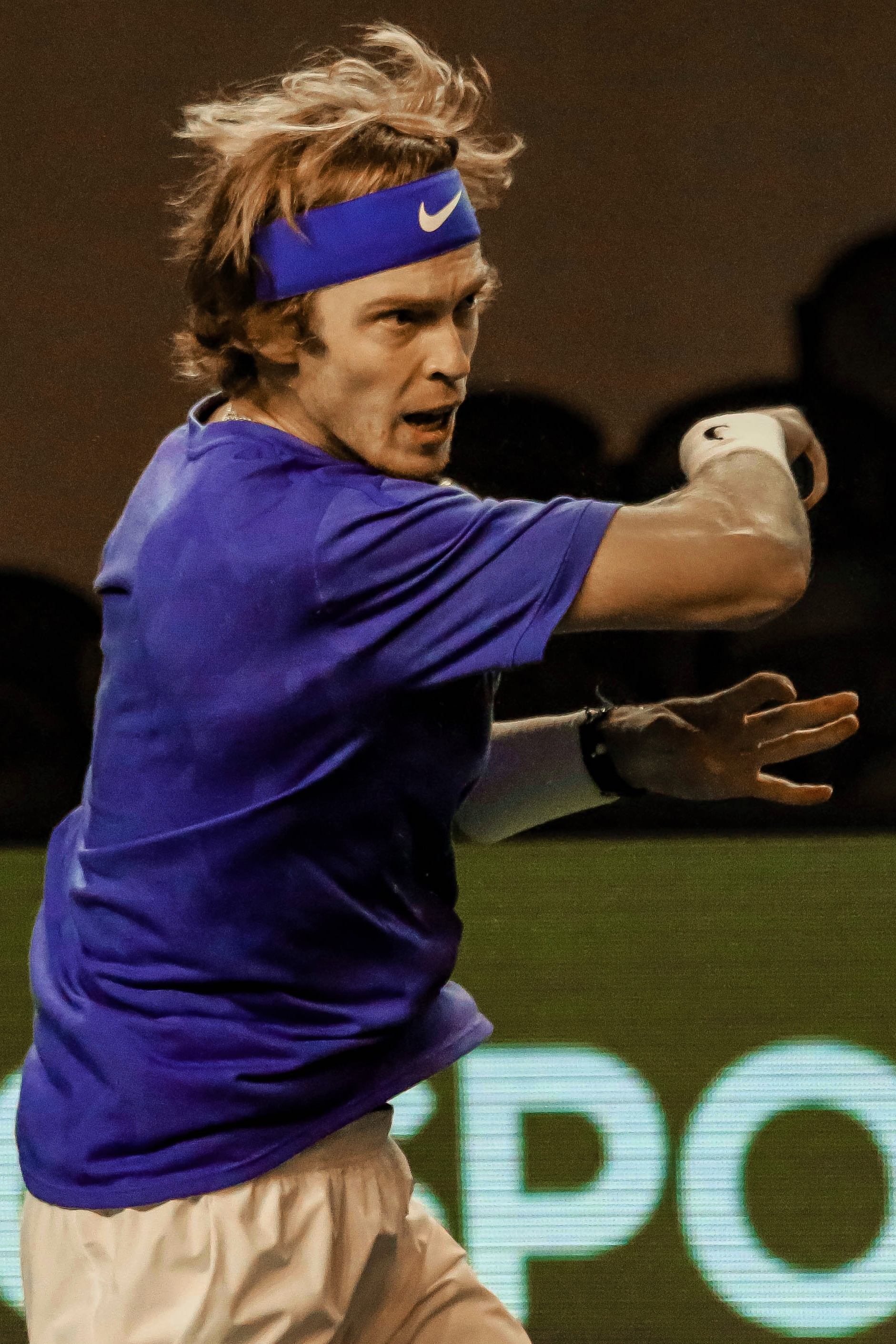
Rublev

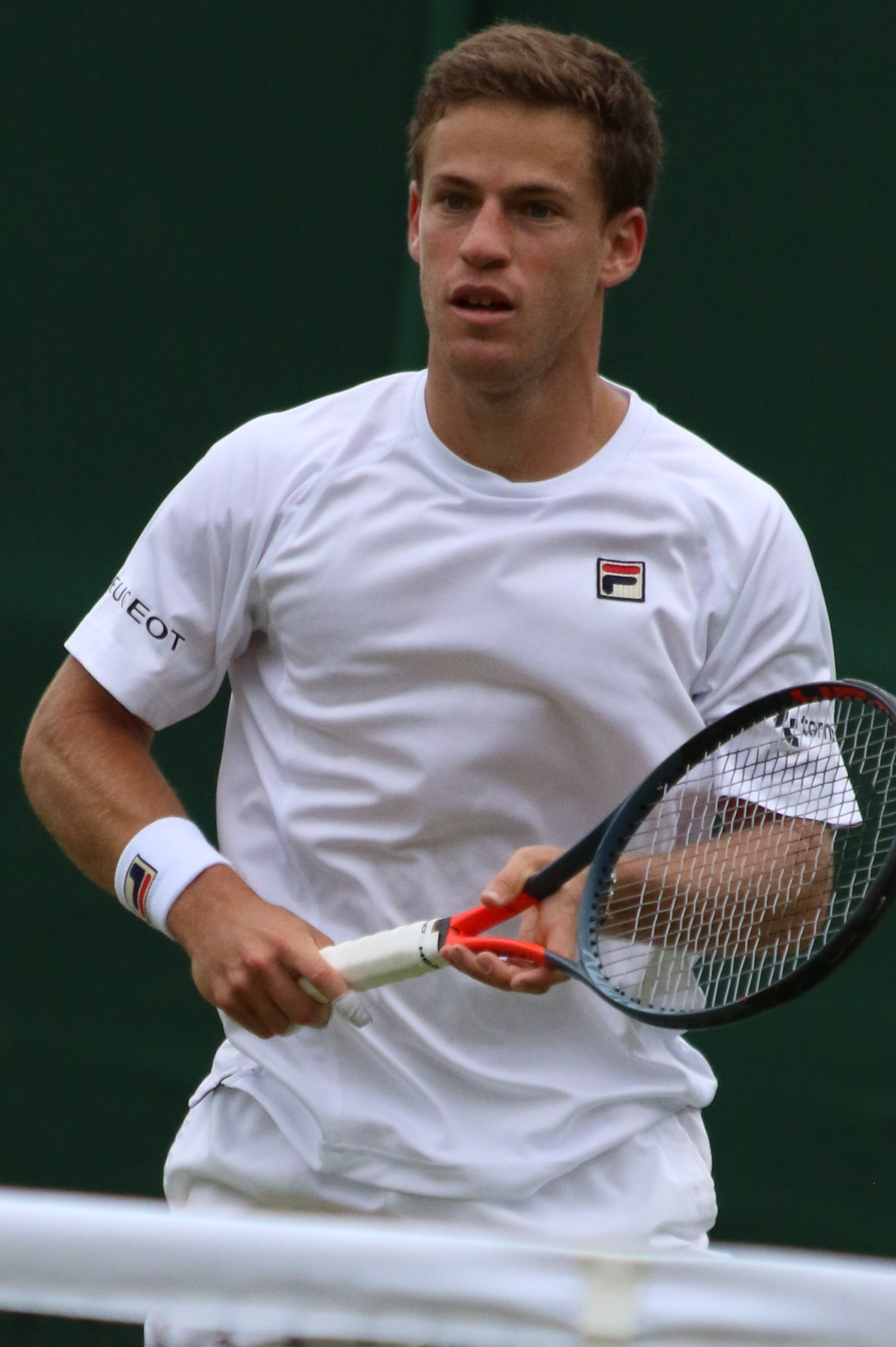
Schwartzman

=== Doubles ===
#	Players	Points	Date qualified
1	(Croatia) Mate Pavić (Brazil) Bruno Soares	3,385	14 September
2	(United States) Rajeev Ram (United Kingdom) Joe Salisbury	3,350	14 August
3	(Germany) Kevin Krawietz (Germany) Andreas Mies	2,910	19 October
4	(Spain) Marcel Granollers (Argentina) Horacio Zeballos	2,440	19 October
5	(Netherlands) Wesley Koolhof (Croatia) Nikola Mektić	2,325	5 November
6	(Australia) John Peers (New Zealand) Michael Venus	2,240	5 November
7	(Austria) Jürgen Melzer (France) Édouard Roger-Vasselin	2,180	13 November
8	(Poland) Łukasz Kubot (Brazil) Marcelo Melo	2,140	6 November

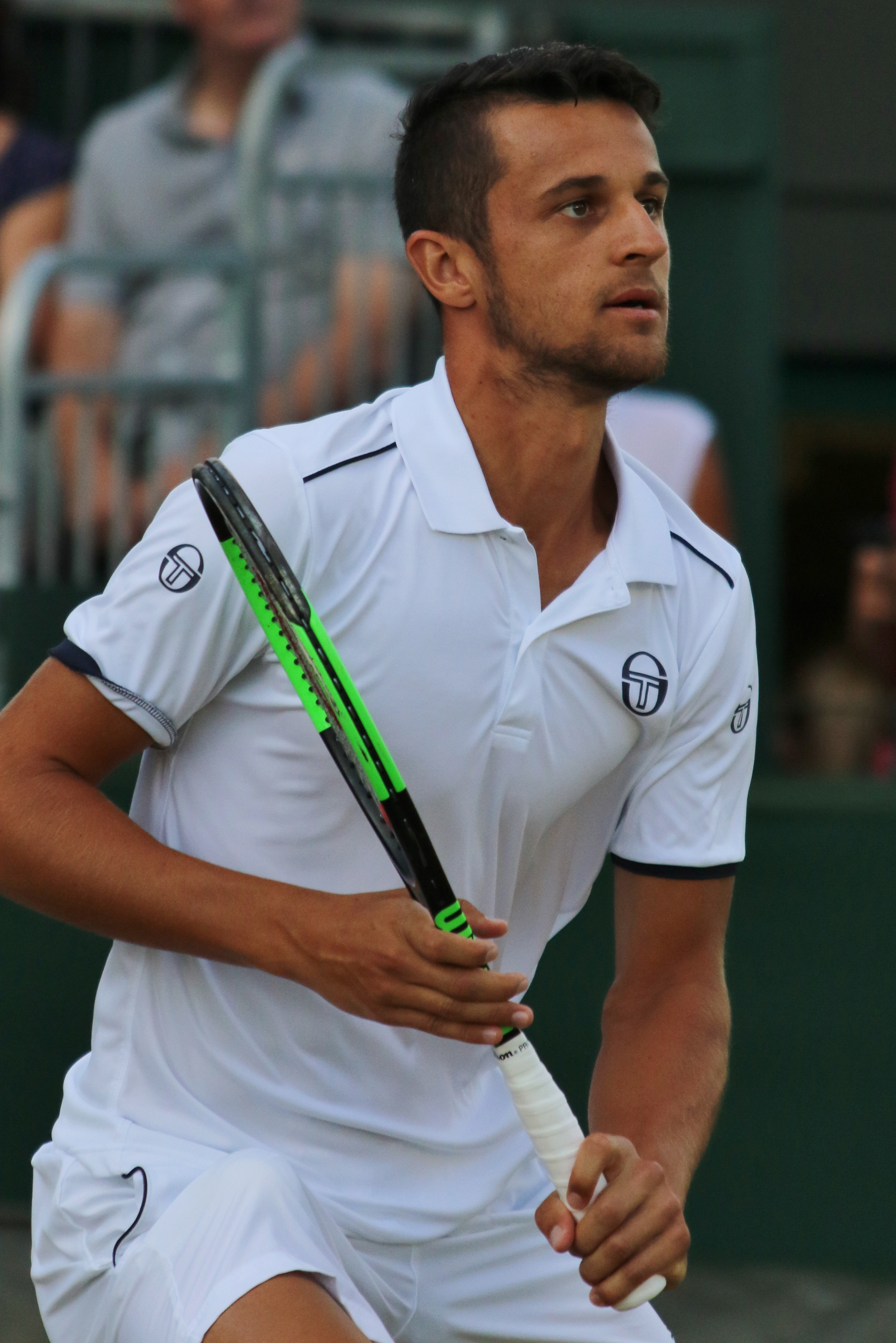
Pavić

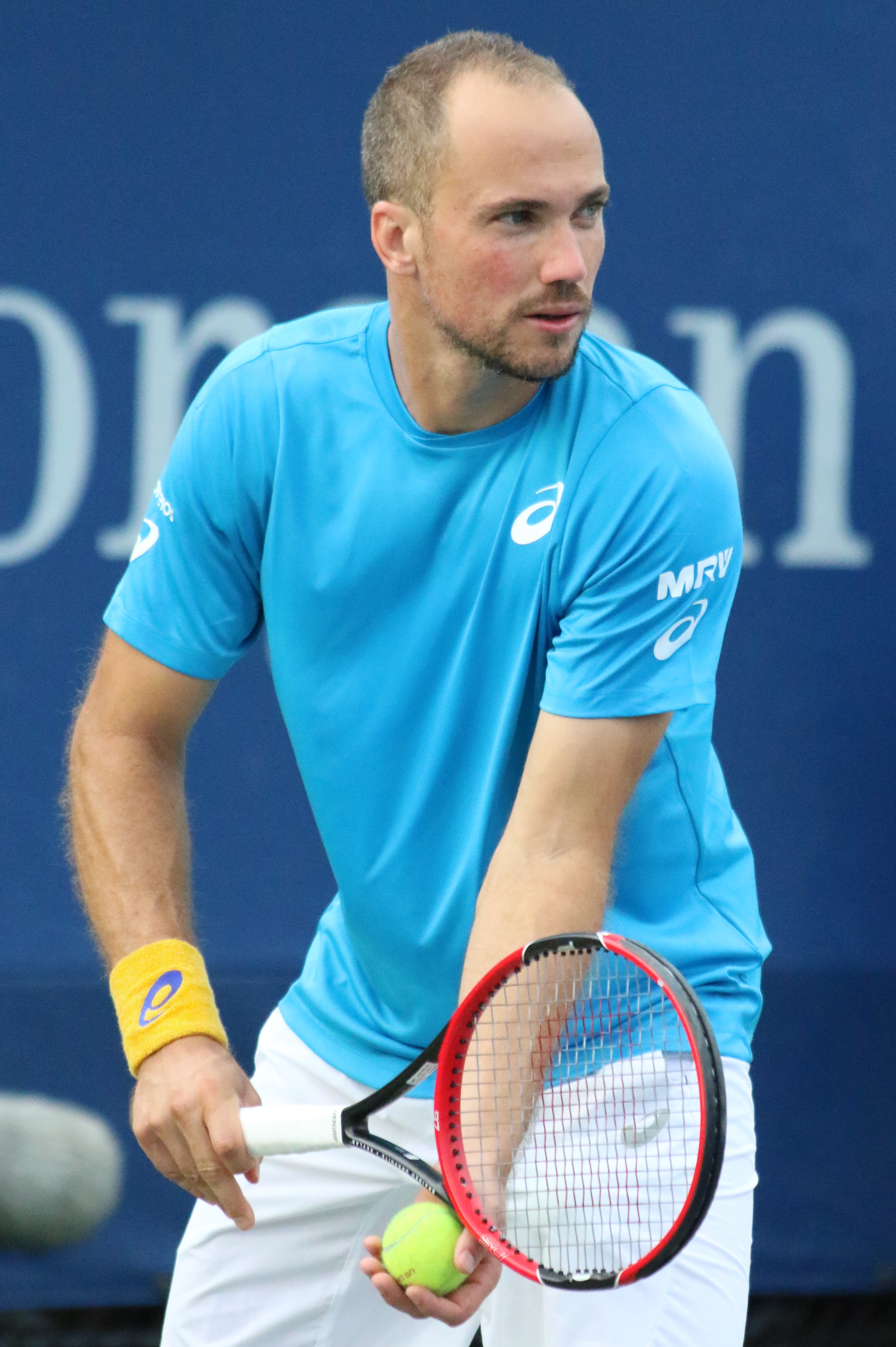
Soares

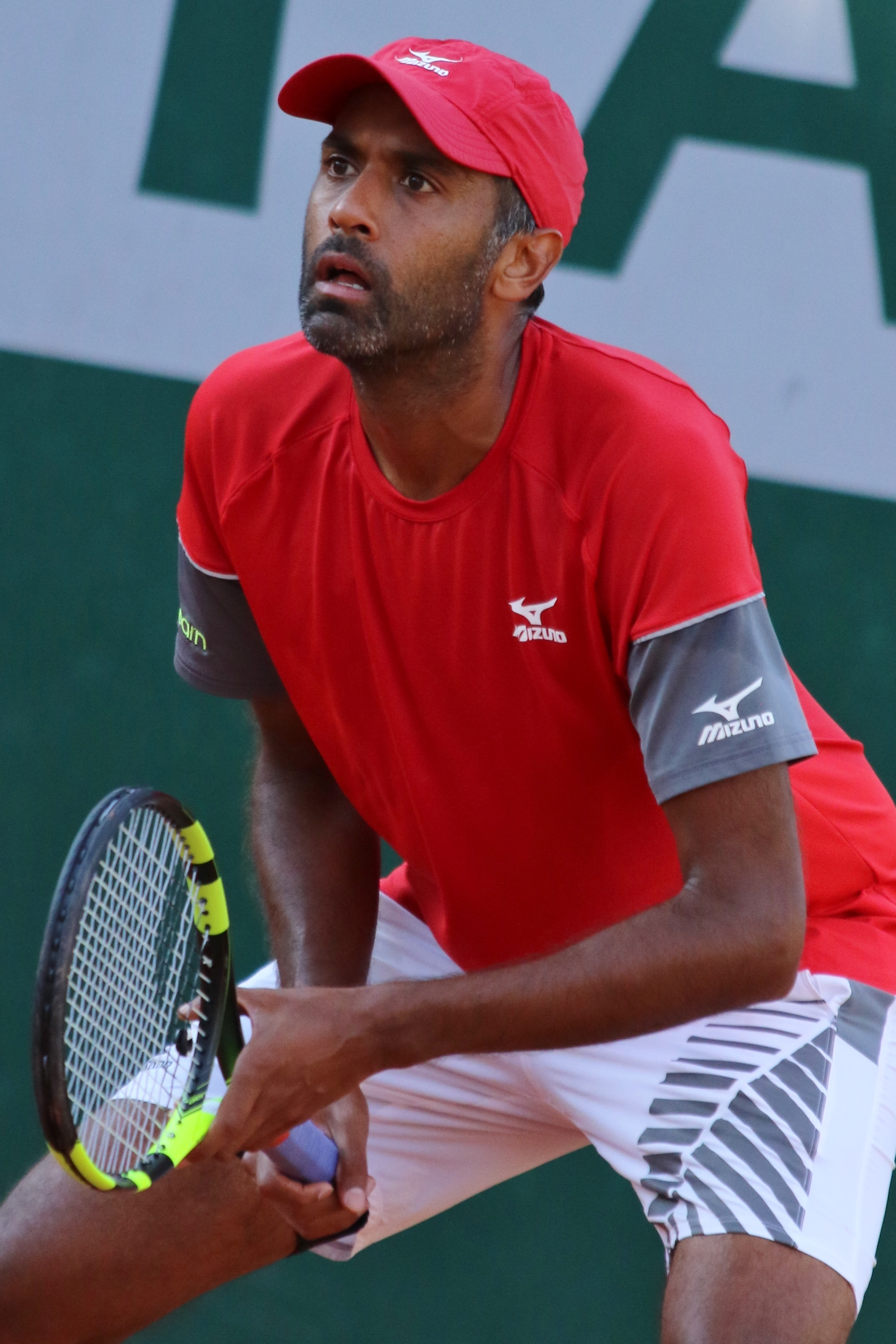
Ram

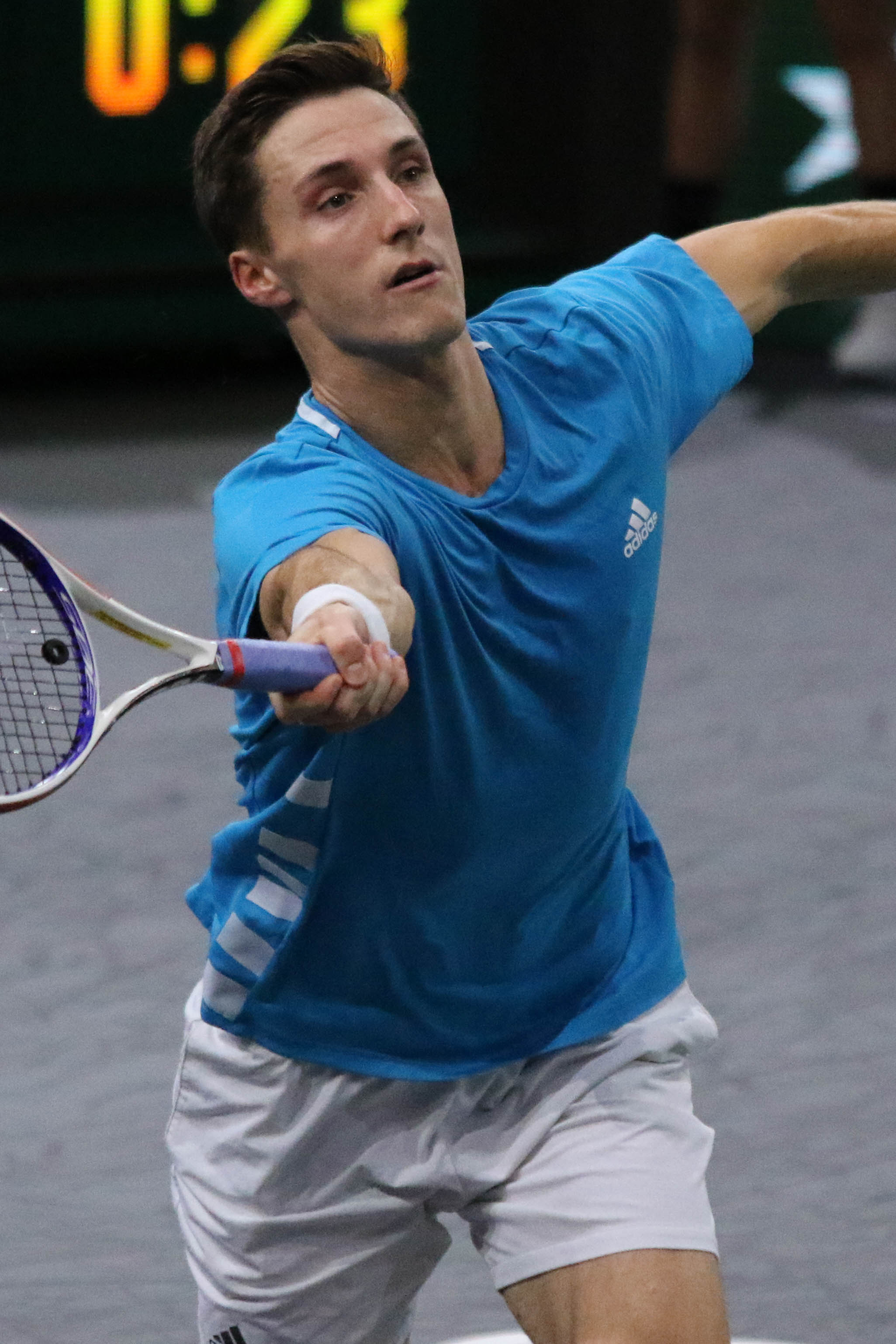
Salisbury

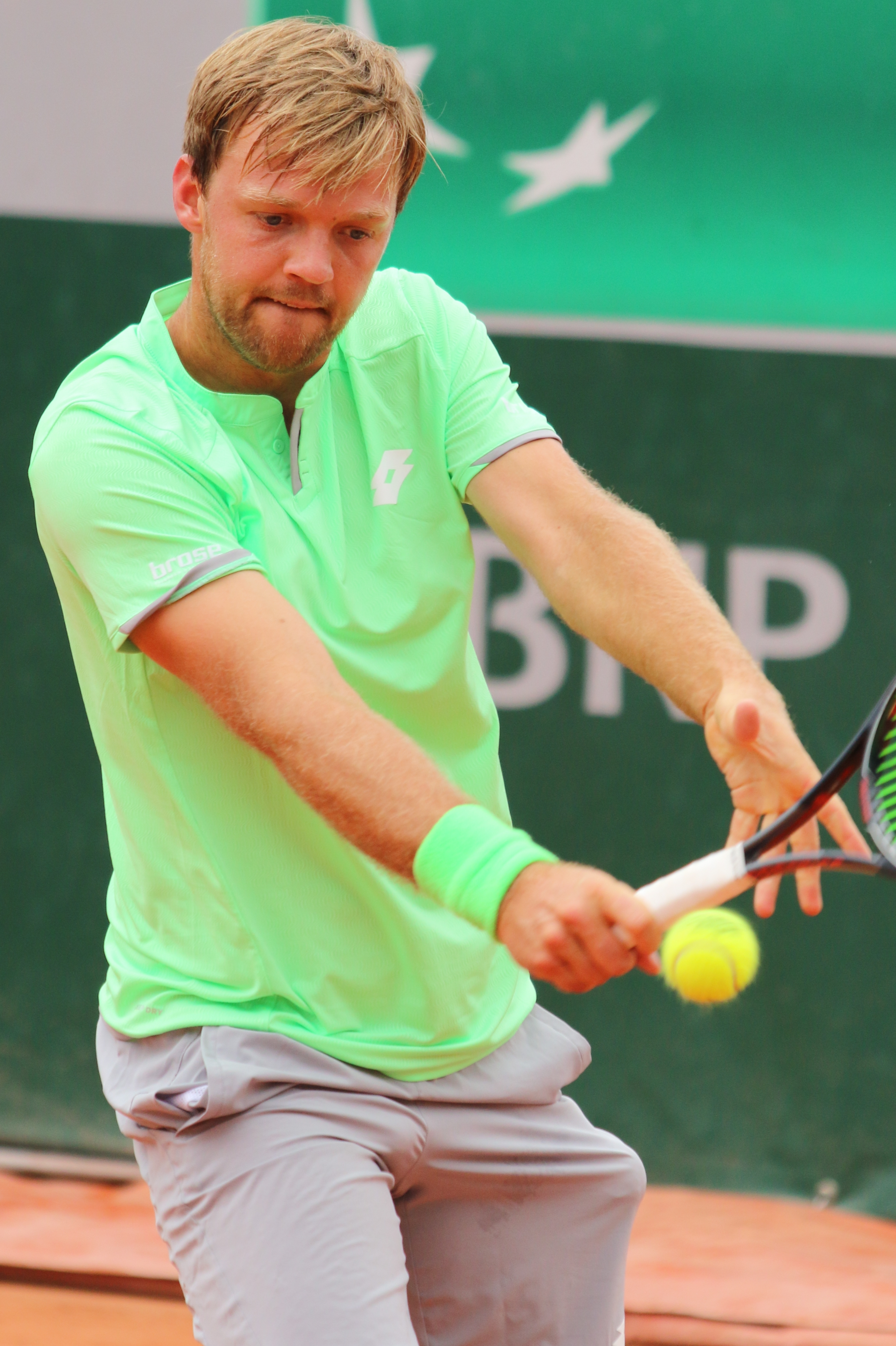
Krawietz

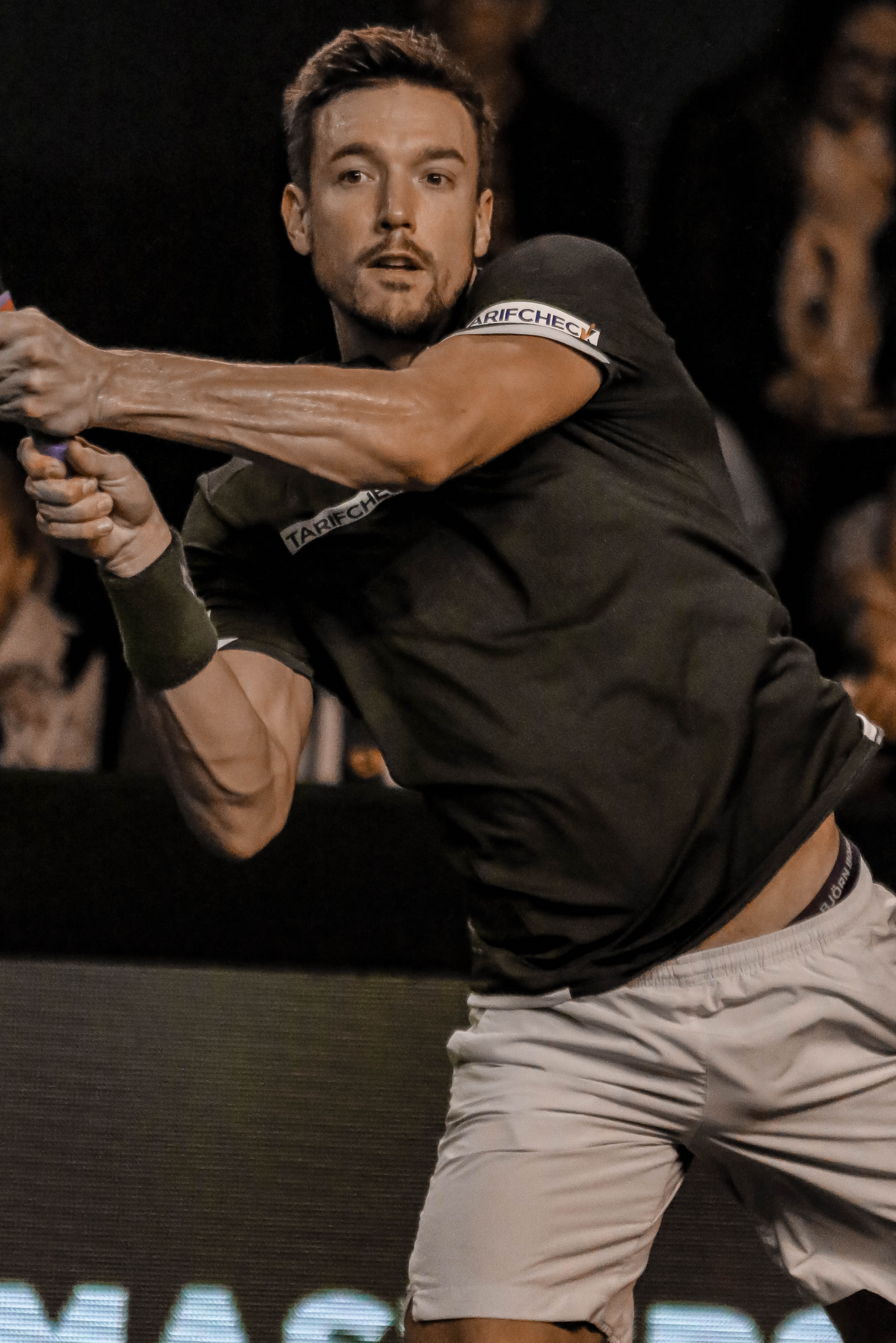
Mies

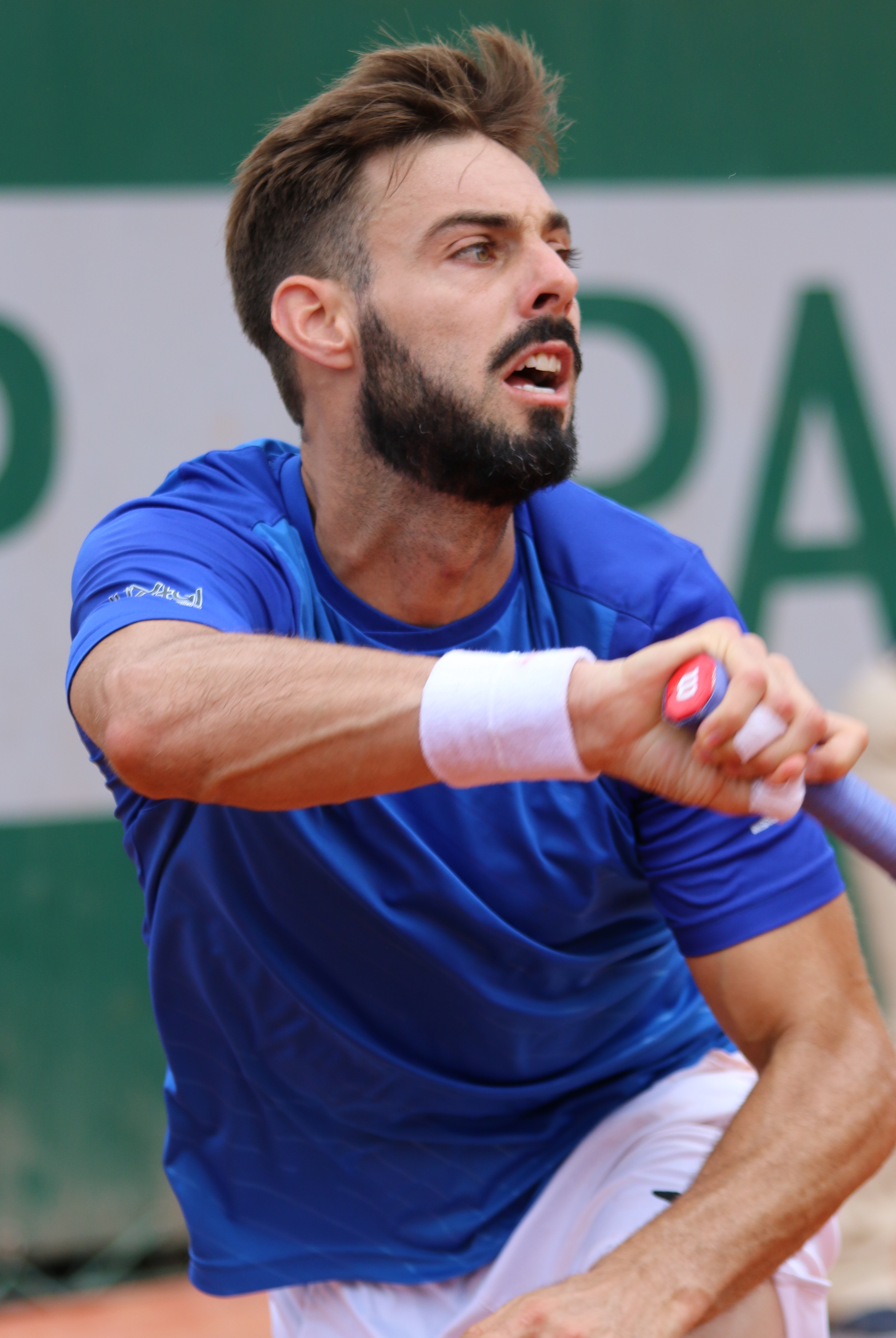
Granollers

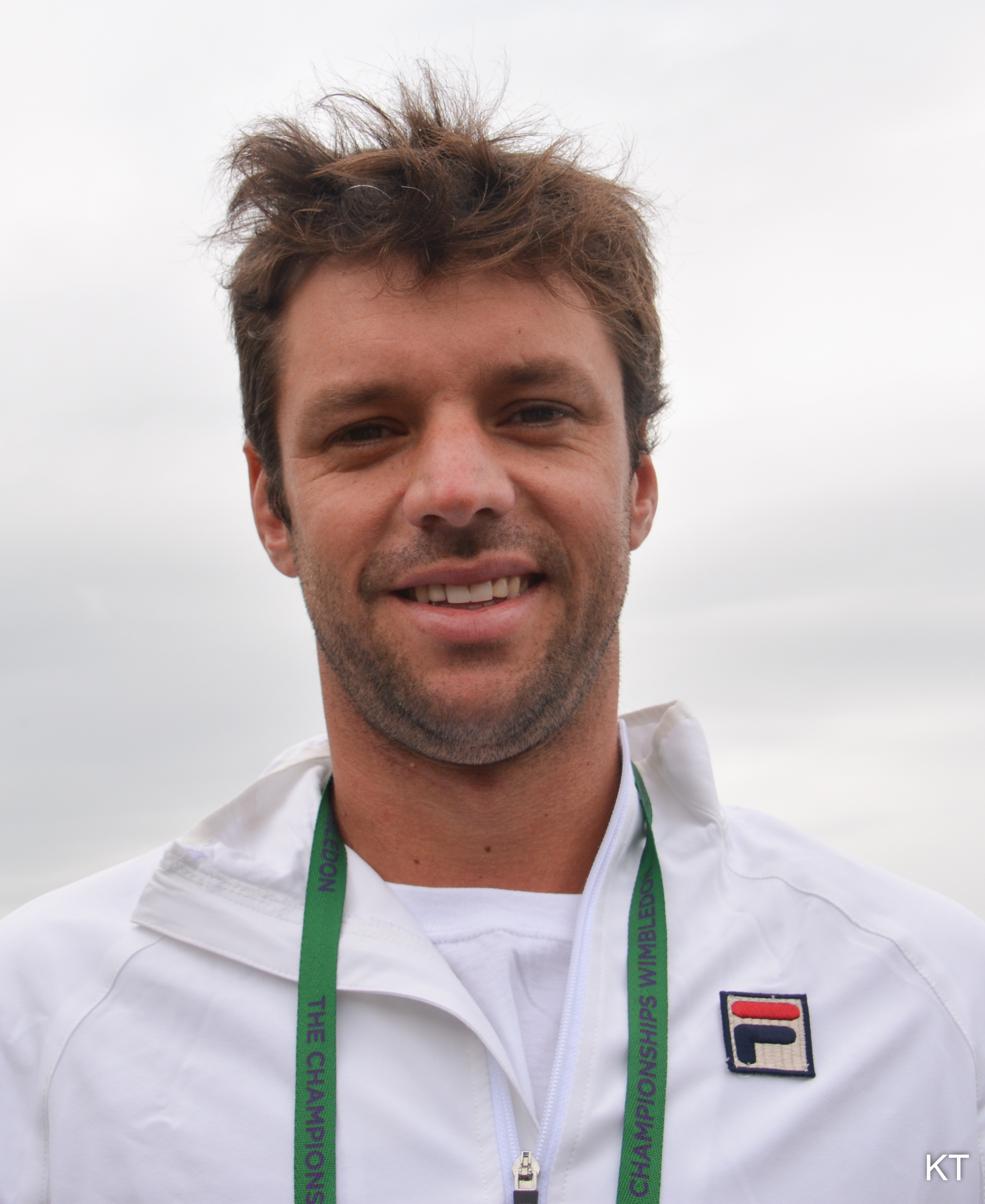
Zeballos

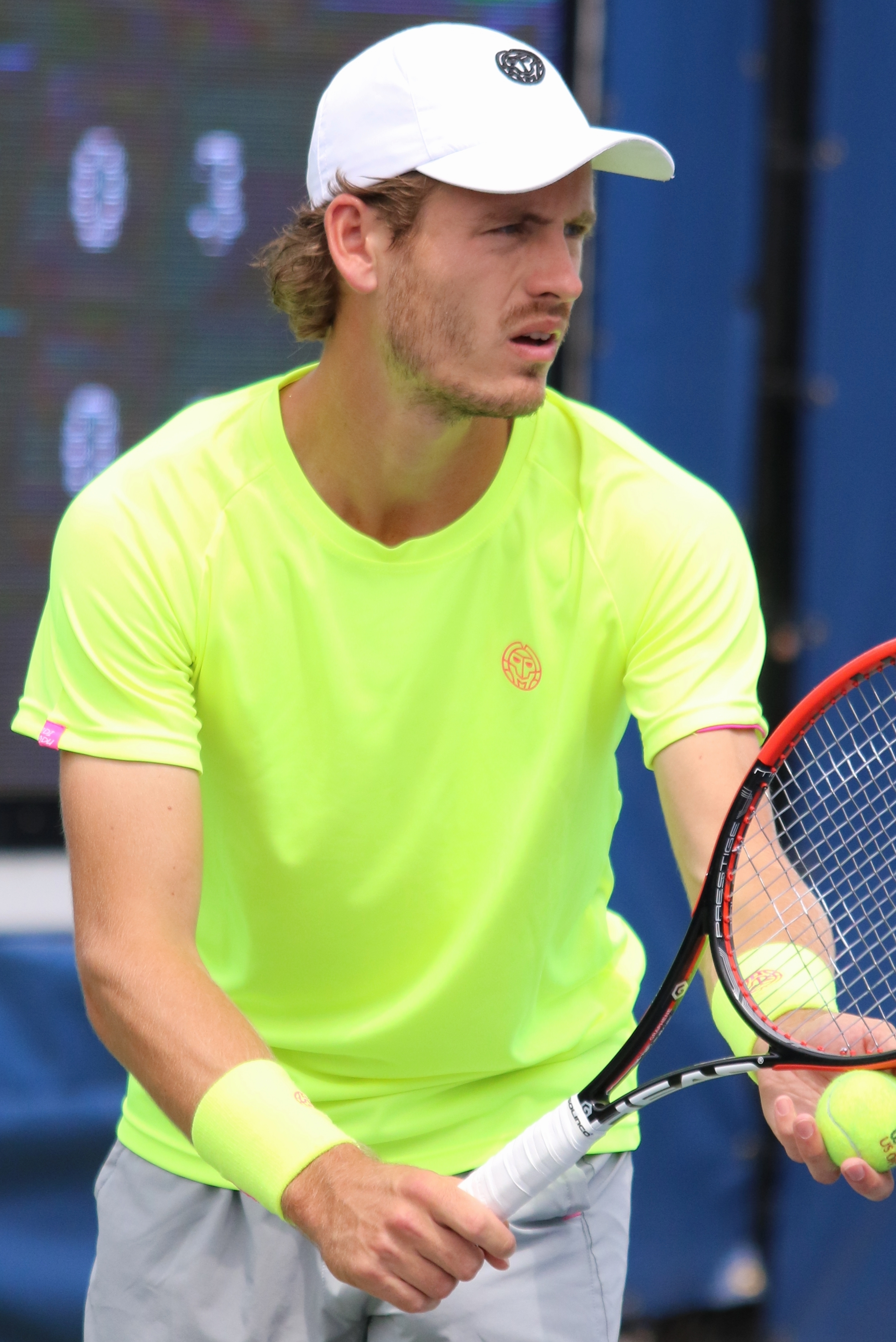
Koolhof

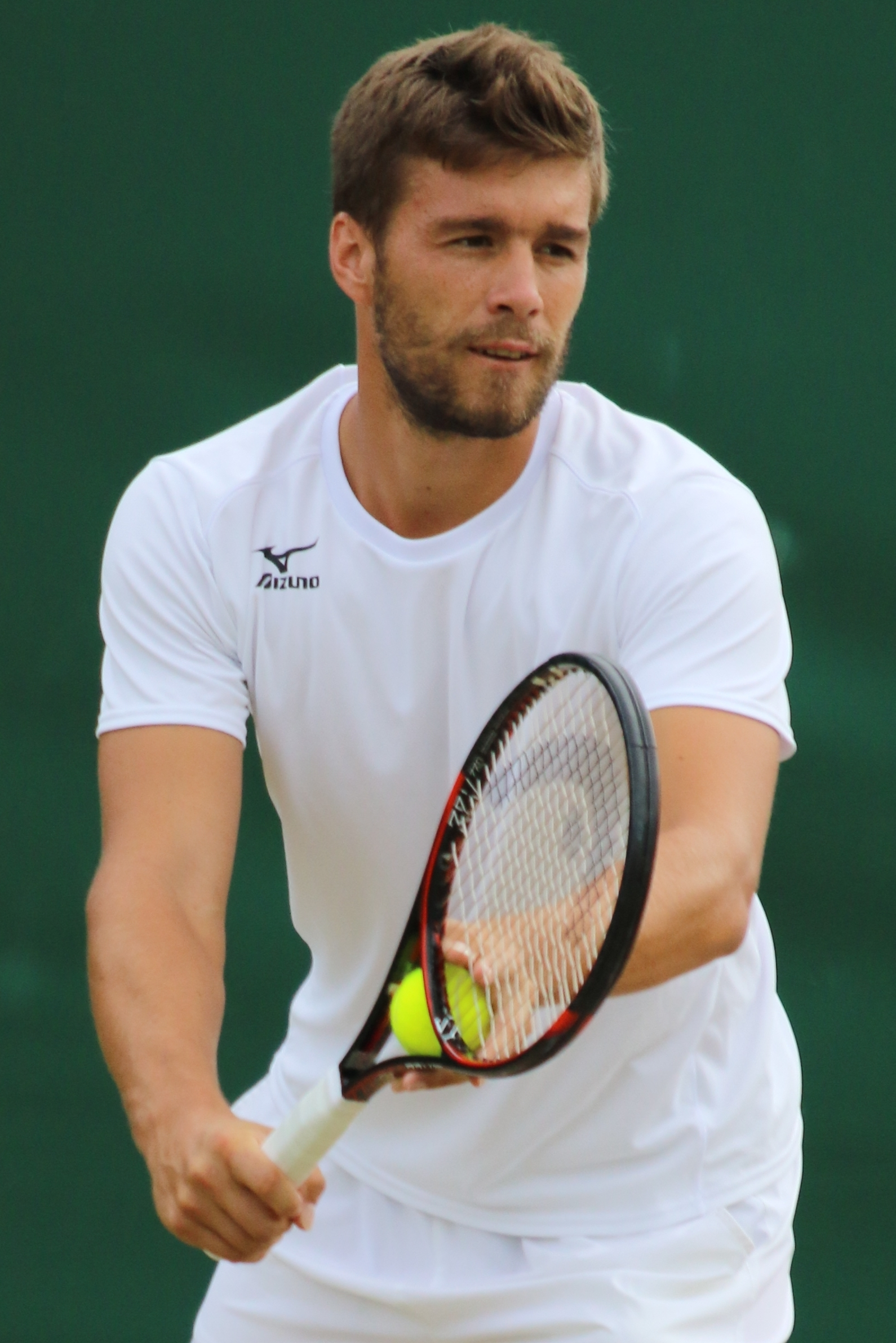
Mektić

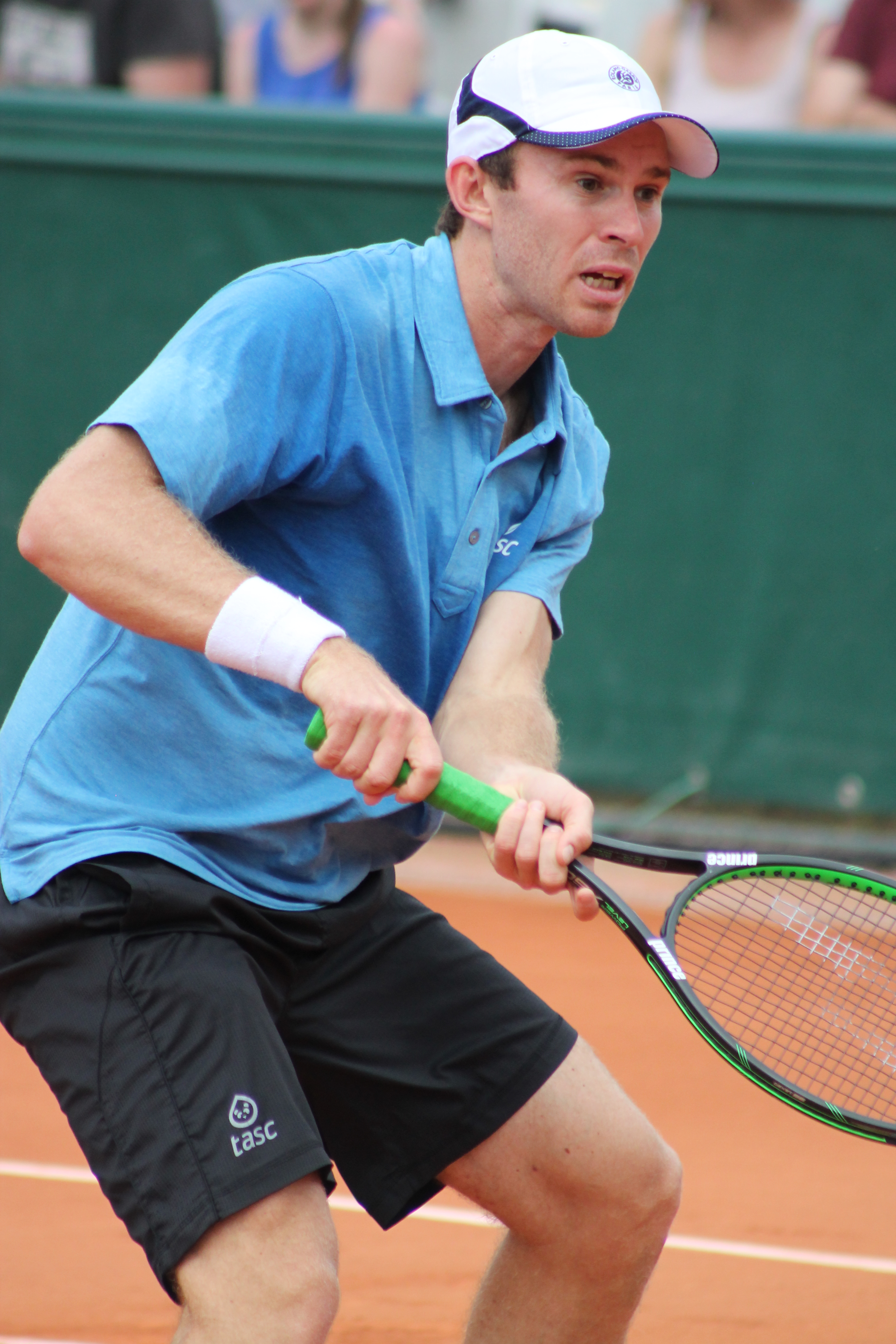
Peers

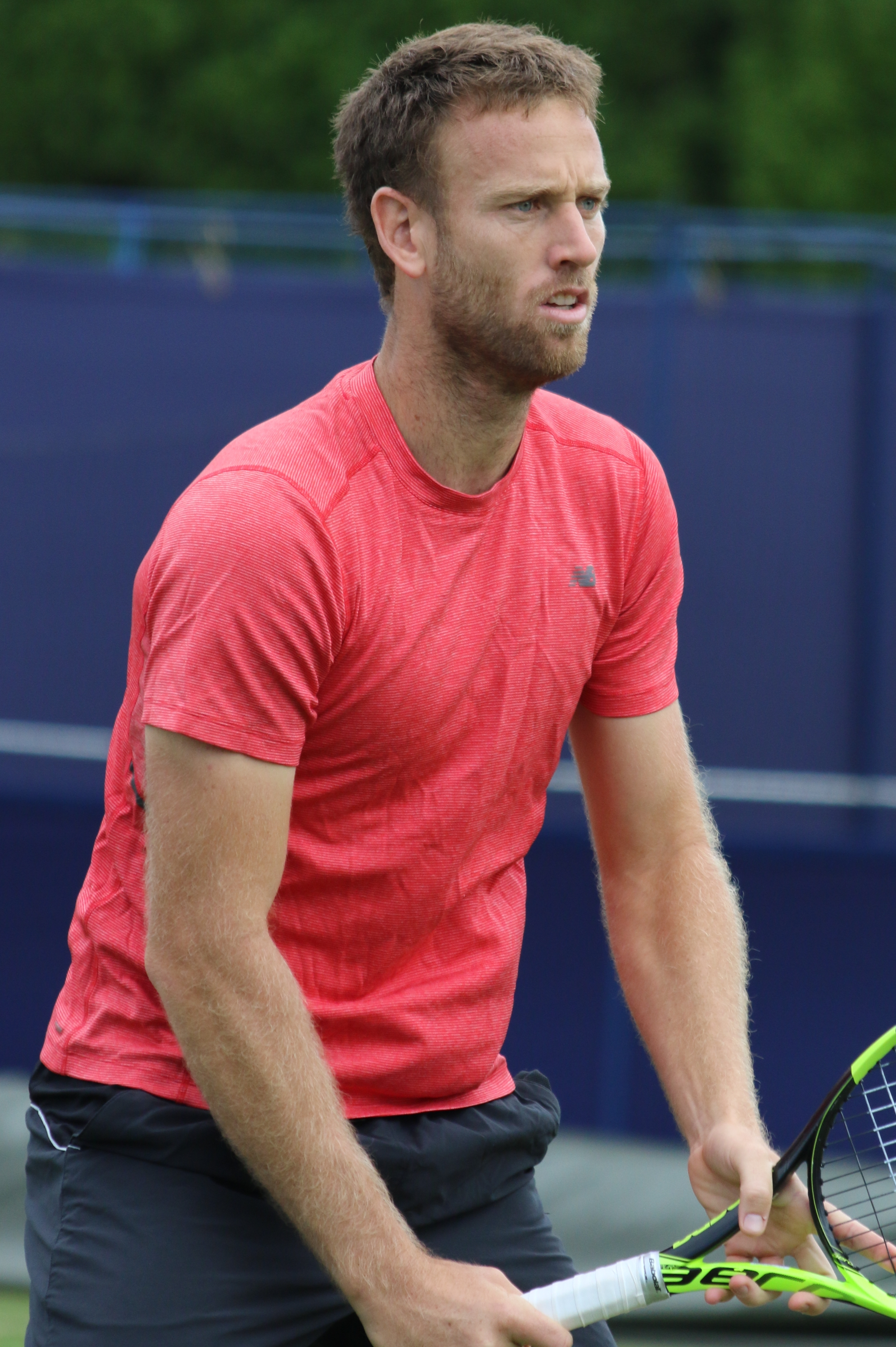
Venus

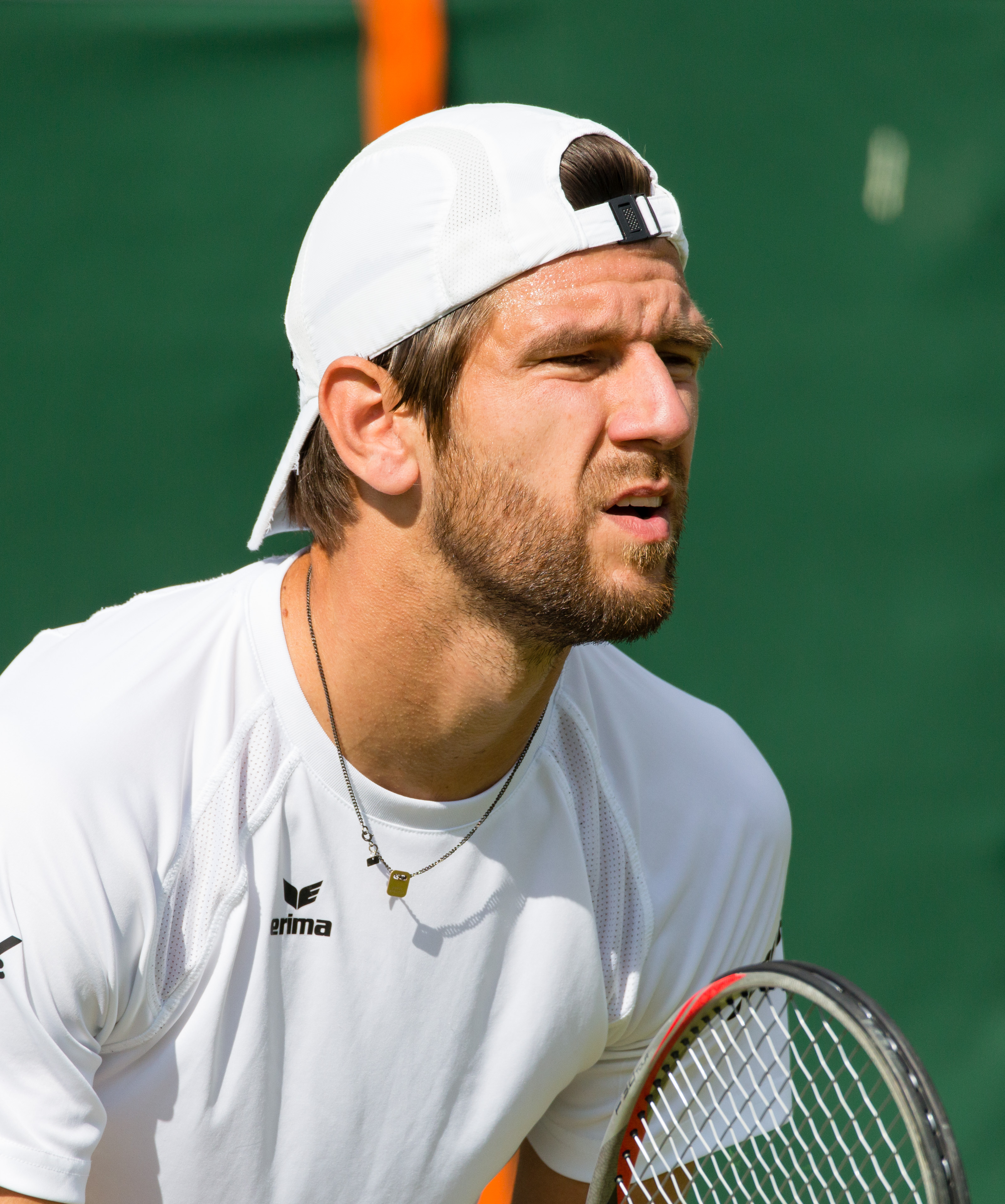
Melzer

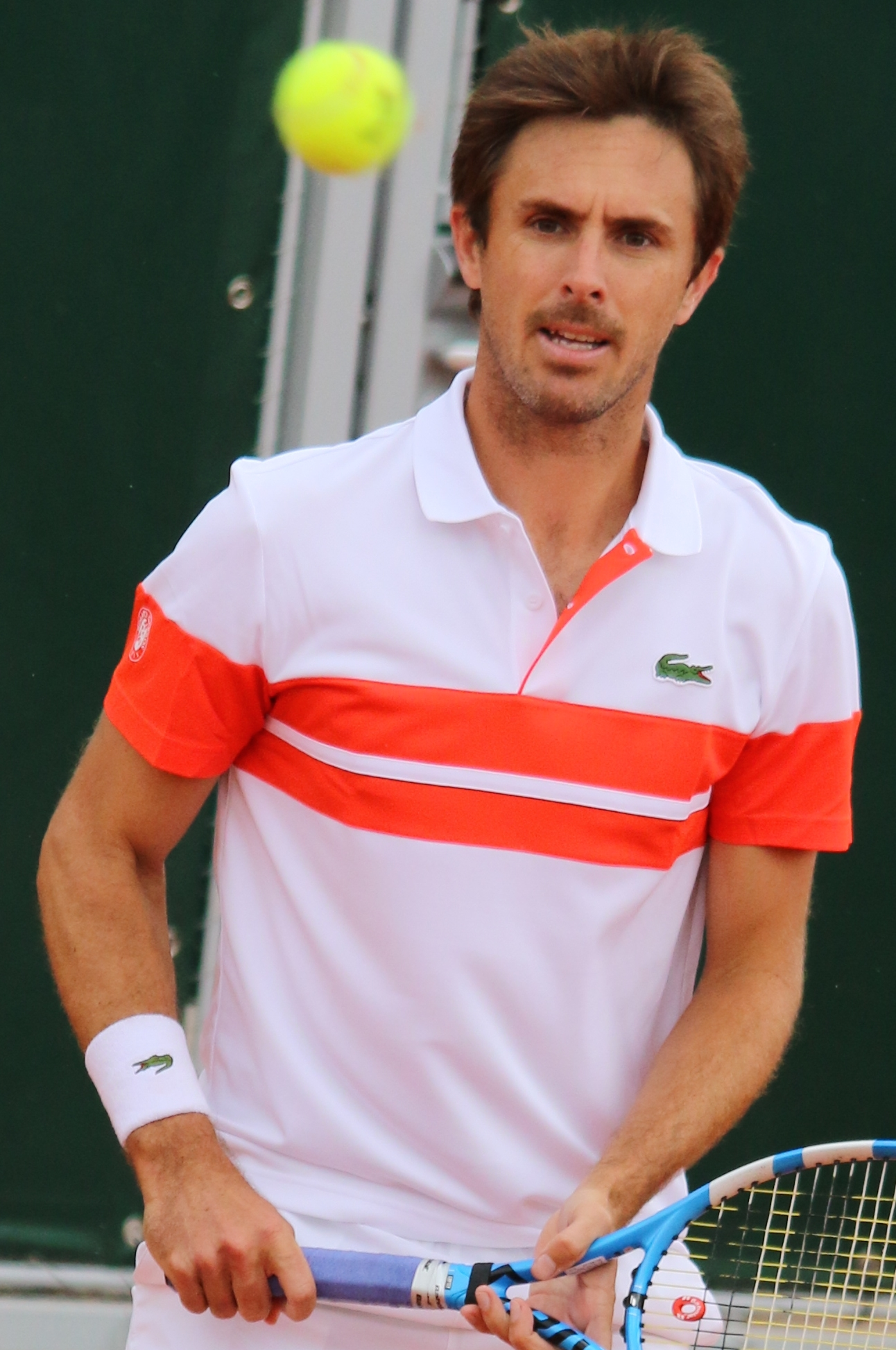
Roger-Vasselin

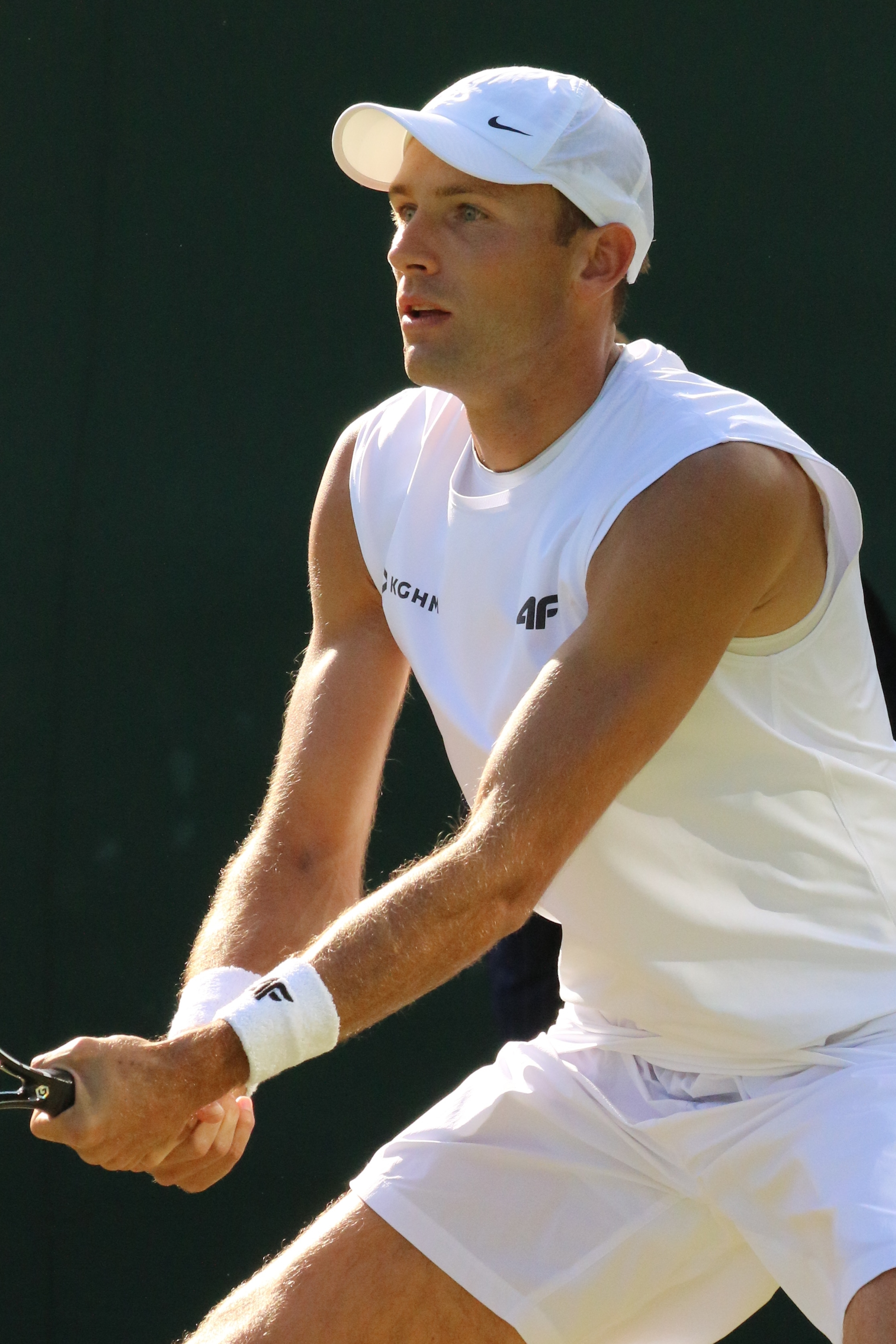
Kubot

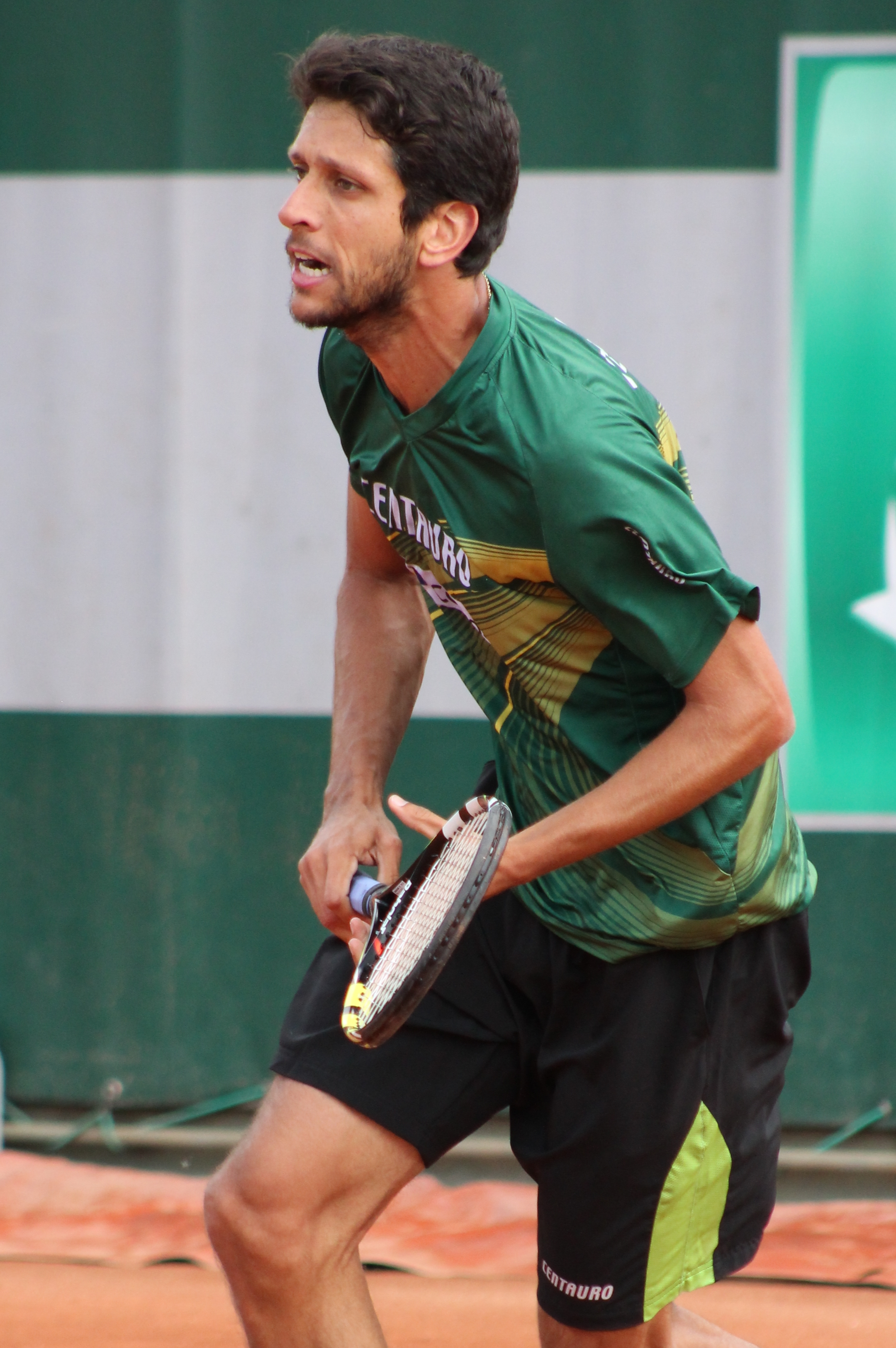
Melo

== Points breakdown ==
=== Singles ===
On 16 March 2020, the ATP rankings were frozen due to the COVID-19 pandemic. As a result of this pandemic, the ATP changed its ranking system for 2020 as the promotion for the 2020 ATP Race is no longer valid. The ATP rankings of 9 November 2020 will be used for the ATP Finals singles qualification.

- Players in gold (*) have qualified for the ATP Finals.
- Players in brown (^{x}) have withdrawn from the ATP Finals.

Seed	Player	Grand Slam				ATP Masters 1000								Best Other						ATP Cup	Total points
Seed	Player	AUS	FRA	WIM	USO	IW	MI	MA	IT	CA	CI	SH	PA	1	2	3	4	5	6	ATP Cup	Total points
1*	(Serbia) Novak Djokovic	W 2000	F 1200	W 2000	R16; 180	R32; 45	R16; 90	W 1000	W 1000	A 0	W 1000	QF; 180	W 1000	W 500	W 500	QF; 180	QF; 90			W 665	11,630
2*	(Spain) Rafael Nadal	QF; 360	W 2000	SF; 720	W 2000	SF; 360	A 0	SF; 360	W 1000	W 1000	A 0	A 0	SF; 360	W 500	SF; 360	SF; 180				F 250	9,450
3*	(Austria) Dominic Thiem	F 1200	F 1200	R128; 10	W 2000	W 1000	R64; 10	SF; 360	R32; 10	QF; 180	R16; 90	QF; 180	R16; 90	W 500	W 500	W 500	W 250	QF; 90	QF; 90	RR; 65	8,325
4*	(Russia) Daniil Medvedev	R16; 180	R128; 10	R32; 90	F 1200	R32; 45	R16; 90	R64; 10	R64; 10	F 600	W 1000	W 1000	W 1000	SF; 360	F 300	F 300	W 250	SF; 180	QF; 90	SF; 255	6,970
-^{x}	(Switzerland) Roger Federer	SF; 720	SF; 720	F 1200	QF; 360	F 600	W 1000	QF; 180	QF; 180	A 0	R16; 90	QF; 180	A 0	W 500	W 500					A 0	6,230
5*	(Germany) Alexander Zverev	SF; 720	QF; 360	R128; 10	F 1200	R32; 45	R64; 10	QF; 180	R32; 10	QF; 180	R32; 10	F 600	F 600	W 250	W 250	W 250	SF; 180	SF; 180	QF; 90	RR; 0	5,125
6*	(Greece) Stefanos Tsitsipas	R32; 90	SF; 720	R128; 10	SF; 180	R64; 10	R16; 90	F 600	SF; 360	R32; 10	SF; 360	SF; 360	QF; 180	F 300	F 300	F 300	W 250	W 250	SF; 180	RR; 75	4,625
7*	(Russia) Andrey Rublev	R16; 180	QF; 360	R64; 45	QF; 360	R32; 53	R32; 61	QF; 90	R32; 45	QF; 90	QF; 205	R16; 90	R16; 90	W 500	W 500	W 500	W 250	W 250	W 250	A 0	3,919
8*	(Argentina) Diego Schwartzman	R16; 180	SF; 720	R32; 90	QF; 360	R32; 45	R64; 10	R32; 45	F 600	R32; 45	R16; 90	R64; 10	QF; 180	F 300	W 250	F 150	F 150	QF; 90	SF; 90	QF; 50	3,455
Alternates
9	(Italy) Matteo Berrettini	R64; 45	R32; 90	R16; 180	SF; 720	R128; 10	R128; 10	QF; 45	QF; 180	A 0	R16; 90	SF; 360	R32; 10	W 250	W 250	SF; 180	SF; 180	F 150	W 125	A 0	2,875
-^{x}	(France) Gaël Monfils	R16; 180	R16; 180	R128; 10	QF; 360	QF; 180	R16; 20	R16; 90	R64; 10	SF; 360	R64; 10	R32; 45	QF; 180	W 500	W 250	SF; 180	SF; 180	QF; 45	QF; 45	RR; 35	2,860
10	(Canada) Denis Shapovalov	R128; 10	R64; 45	R128; 10	QF; 360	R16; 90	SF; 360	R64; 10	SF; 360	R32; 45	R32; 45	R32; 45	F 600	W 250	SF; 180	SF; 90	SF; 90	R16; 45	QF; 45	QF; 150	2,830

Note: Ranking points in italics indicate that a player did not qualify for (or used an exemption to skip) a Grand Slam or Masters 1000 event and substituted his next best result in its place.

Below is the unofficial ATP Race ranking for only 2020 events.

Rank	Player	Grand Slam				ATP Tour Masters 1000								Best Other						ATP Cup	Total points	Tourn
Rank	Player	AUS	WI (Note: Wimbledon was cancelled due to the COVID-19 pandemic.)	USO	FO (Note: French Open was rescheduled to September due to the COVID-19 pandemic.)	IW (Note: Indian Wells Masters, Miami Open, Canadian Open and Shanghai Masters were cancelled due to the COVID-19 pandemic.)	MI	MA (Note: Madrid Open was initially rescheduled to September, but later cancelled due to the COVID-19 pandemic.)	CA	CI (Note: Cincinnati Masters was held in New York City instead of Cincinnati to reduce travel due to the COVID-19 pandemic.)	IT (Note: Italian Open was rescheduled to September due to the COVID-19 pandemic.)	SH	PA	1	2	3	4	5	6	ATP Cup	Total points	Tourn
1*	(Serbia) Novak Djokovic	W 2000	–	R16; 0	F 1200	–	–	–	–	W 1000	W 1000	–	A 0	W 500	QF; 90					W 665	6,455	8
2*	(Austria) Dominic Thiem	F 1200	–	W 2000	QF; 360	–	–	–	–	R32; 10	A 0	–	A 0	QF; 90	QF; 90					RR; 65	3,815	7
3*	(Spain) Rafael Nadal	QF; 360	–	A 0	W 2000	–	–	–	–	A 0	QF; 180	–	SF; 360	W 500						F 250	3,650	6
4*	(Germany) Alexander Zverev	SF; 720	–	F 1200	R16; 180	–	–	–	–	R32; 10	A 0	–	F 600	W 250	W 250	R16; 45				RR; 0	3,255	9
5*	(Russia) Andrey Rublev	R16; 180	–	QF; 360	QF; 360	–	–	–	–	R64; 10	R32; 45	–	R16; 90	W 500	W 500	W 500	W 250	W 250	QF; 90	A 0	3,135	13
6*	(Russia) Daniil Medvedev	R16; 180	–	SF; 720	R128; 10	–	–	–	–	QF; 180	A 0	–	W 1000	QF; 90	R16; 45	QF; 45	R32; 0	R32; 0		SF; 255	2,525	11
7*	(Greece) Stefanos Tsitsipas	R32; 90	–	R32; 90	SF; 720	–	–	–	–	SF; 360	R32; 10	–	R32; 10	F 300	F 300	W 250	R16; 45	R16; 45		RR; 75	2,295	12
8*	(Argentina) Diego Schwartzman	R16; 180	–	R128; 10	SF; 720	–	–	–	–	R32; 45	F 600	–	QF; 180	F 150	F 150	SF; 90	QF; 45			QF; 50	2,220	11
9	(Canada) Milos Raonic	QF; 360	–	R64; 45	A 0	–	–	–	–	F 600	R32; 45	–	SF; 360	SF; 180	SF; 90	QF; 45	R16; 0	R16; 0		A 0	1,725	10
10	(Spain) Pablo Carreño Busta	R32; 90	–	SF; 720	QF; 360	–	–	–	–	R32; 45	R32; 10	–	QF; 180	SF; 180	R16; 45	QF; 45	R32; 0	R16; 0	R32; 0	A 0	1,675	12

=== Doubles ===
- Teams in gold have qualified for the ATP Finals.

Rank	Player	Points																		Total points	Tourn
Rank	Player	1	2	3	4	5	6	7	8	9	10	11	12	13	14	15	16	17	18	Total points	Tourn
1	(Croatia) Mate Pavić (Brazil) Bruno Soares	F 1200	W 1000	F 600	R16; 180	QF; 180	QF; 90	QF; 90	QF; 45	R32; 0	R16; 0	R16; 0								3,385	11
2	(United States) Rajeev Ram (United Kingdom) Joe Salisbury	W 2000	QF; 360	SF; 360	SF; 360	QF; 90	QF; 90	SF; 90	R32; 0	R16; 0										3,350	9
3	(Germany) Kevin Krawietz (Germany) Andreas Mies	W 2000	QF; 180	SF; 180	F 150	R16; 90	QF; 90	QF; 90	SF; 90	RR; 40	R64; 0	R32; 0	R16; 0	R16; 0						2,910	13
4	(Spain) Marcel Granollers (Argentina) Horacio Zeballos	W 1000	W 500	W 250	R16; 180	R16; 180	QF; 180	F 150	R32; 0	R16; 0										2,440	9
5	(Netherlands) Wesley Koolhof (Croatia) Nikola Mektić	SF; 720	F 600	QF; 180	QF; 180	SF; 180	F 150	R32; 90	R16; 90	QF; 90	QF; 45	R16; 0	R16; 0							2,325	12
6	(Australia) John Peers (New Zealand) Michael Venus	W 500	W 500	SF; 360	W 250	R16; 180	QF; 180	R32; 90	R16; 90	SF; 90	R32; 0	R16; 0	R16; 0	R16; 0						2,240	13
7	(Austria) Jürgen Melzer (France) Édouard Roger-Vasselin	W 500	SF; 360	SF; 360	R16; 180	SF; 180	F 150	R32; 90	R16; 90	QF; 90	QF; 45	QF; 45	QF; 45	QF; 45	R32; 0	R16; 0				2,180	15
8	(Poland) Łukasz Kubot (Brazil) Marcelo Melo	W 500	W 500	SF; 360	SF; 180	F 150	R32; 90	R32; 90	R16; 90	QF; 90	QF; 45	QF; 45	R32; 0	R32; 0						2,140	13
Alternates
9	(United Kingdom) Jamie Murray (United Kingdom) Neal Skupski	F 600	QF; 360	F 300	W 250	QF; 180	R32; 90	R16; 90	QF; 90	SF; 90	SF; 90	R32; 0	R16; 0	R16; 0	R16; 0	R16; 0	R16; 0			2,140	16
10	(Australia) Max Purcell (Australia) Luke Saville	F 1200	QF; 180	F 150	SF; 90	QF; 45	R64; 0	R32; 0	R32; 0	R32; 0	R16; 0	R16; 0	R16; 0							1,665	12

Note: The US Open doubles points breakdown was the same as an ATP Masters 1000 because of a reduced 32-draw size.

== Head-to-head ==
Below are the head-to-head records as they approached the tournament.

=== Singles ===
Overall

		Djokovic	Nadal	Thiem	Medvedev	Zverev	Tsitsipas	Rublev	Schwartzman	Overall	YTD W–L
1	(Serbia) Novak Djokovic		29–27	7–4	4–2	3–2	4–2	0–0	5–0	52–37	39–3
2	(Spain) Rafael Nadal	27–29		9–5	3–0	5–2	5–1	1–0	10–1	60–38	25–5
3	(Austria) Dominic Thiem	4–7	5–9		3–1	8–2	4–3	2–2	6–3	32–27	22–7
4	(Russia) Daniil Medvedev	2–4	0–3	1–3		2–5	5–1	3–0	4–0	17–16	23–10
5	(Germany) Alexander Zverev	2–3	2–5	2–8	5–2		1–5	4–0	2–2	18–25	27–9
6	(Greece) Stefanos Tsitsipas	2–4	1–5	3–4	1–5	5–1		2–2	1–1	15–22	28–12
7	(Russia) Andrey Rublev	0–0	0–1	2–2	0–3	0–4	2–2		0–1	4–13	40–8
8	(Argentina) Diego Schwartzman	0–5	1–10	3–6	0–4	2–2	1–1	1–0		8–28	25–12

Indoor hardcourt

		Djokovic	Nadal	Thiem	Medvedev	Zverev	Tsitsipas	Rublev	Schwartzman	Overall	YTD W–L
1	(Serbia) Novak Djokovic		4–2	1–1	1–0	1–1	1–0	0–0	0–0	8–4	2–1
2	(Spain) Rafael Nadal	2–4		0–0	1–0	0–2	1–0	0–0	1–0	5–6	3–1
3	(Austria) Dominic Thiem	1–1	0–0		1–0	2–0	0–1	1–1	1–0	6–3	2–1
4	(Russia) Daniil Medvedev	0–1	0–1	0–1		1–2	1–1	1–0	2–0	5–6	9–4
5	(Germany) Alexander Zverev	1–1	2–0	0–2	2–1		0–1	0–0	2–0	7–5	12–1
6	(Greece) Stefanos Tsitsipas	0–1	0–1	1–0	1–1	1–0		1–0	0–1	4–4	6–3
7	(Russia) Andrey Rublev	0–0	0–0	1–1	0–1	0–0	0–1		0–0	1–3	13–2
8	(Argentina) Diego Schwartzman	0–0	0–1	0–1	0–2	0–2	1–0	0–0		1–6	5–2

=== Doubles ===
		Pavić; Soares	Ram; Salisbury	Krawietz; Mies	Granollers; Zeballos	Koolhof; Mektić	Peers; Venus	Melzer; Roger-V.	Kubot; Melo	Overall	YTD W–L
1	(Croatia) Mate Pavić (Brazil) Bruno Soares		1–1	1–2	1–1	2–0	0–0	1–0	1–1	7–5	20–10
2	(United States) Rajeev Ram (United Kingdom) Joe Salisbury	1–1		0–1	3–2	0–2	0–1	0–0	2–2	6–9	18–7
3	(Germany) Kevin Krawietz (Germany) Andreas Mies	2–1	1–0		0–1	1–1	1–0	1–1	0–1	6–5	19–13
4	(Spain) Marcel Granollers (Argentina) Horacio Zeballos	1–1	2–3	1–0		0–0	1–0	0–0	0–0	5–4	22–6
5	(Netherlands) Wesley Koolhof (Croatia) Nikola Mektić	0–2	2–0	1–1	0–0		0–0	0–0	0–0	3–3	20–12
6	(Australia) John Peers (New Zealand) Michael Venus	0–0	1–0	0–1	0–1	0–0		1–0	1–0	3–2	22–10
7	(Austria) Jürgen Melzer (France) Édouard Roger-V.	0–1	0–0	1–1	0–0	0–0	0–1		0–1	1–4	23–13
8	(Poland) Łukasz Kubot (Brazil) Marcelo Melo	1–1	2–2	1–0	0–0	0–0	0–1	1–0		5–4	20–11

== See also ==
- ATP rankings
- 2020 WTA Finals
- 2020 Next Generation ATP Finals
