= 2020 Rio Open =

Professional men's tennis tournament played on outdoor clay courts

- Date: 17–23 February
- Edition: 7th
- Draw: 32S / 16D
- Surface: Clay
- Location: Rio de Janeiro, Brazil
- Venue: Jockey Club Brasileiro

Champions

Singles
- (Chile) Cristian Garín

Doubles
- (Spain) Marcel Granollers / (Argentina) Horacio Zeballos
- Rio Open

The 2020 Rio Open presented by Claro was a professional men's tennis tournament played on outdoor clay courts. It was the seventh edition of the Rio Open, and part of the ATP Tour 500 series on the 2020 ATP Tour. It took place in Rio de Janeiro, Brazil between 17 February and 23 February 2020. Third-seeded Cristian Garín won the singles title.

== Finals ==
=== Singles ===
- (Chile) Cristian Garín defeated (Italy) Gianluca Mager, 7–6^{(7–3)}, 7–5

=== Doubles ===
- (Spain) Marcel Granollers / (Argentina) Horacio Zeballos defeated (Italy) Salvatore Caruso / (Italy) Federico Gaio, 6–4, 5–7, [10–7]

== Singles main-draw entrants ==
=== Seeds ===
Country	Player	Rank^{1}	Seed
AUT	Dominic Thiem	4	1
SRB	Dušan Lajović	23	2
CHI	Cristian Garín	26	3
ARG	Guido Pella	27	4
CRO	Borna Ćorić	31	5
~~SRB~~	~~Laslo Đere~~	~~35~~	~~6~~
ESP	Albert Ramos Viñolas	42	7
NOR	Casper Ruud	45	8
ESP	Fernando Verdasco	47	9

- ^{1} Rankings as of February 10, 2020.

=== Other entrants ===
The following players received wildcards into the singles main draw:

- (Spain) Carlos Alcaraz
- (Brazil) Felipe Meligeni Alves
- (Brazil) Thiago Seyboth Wild

The following player received entry as a special exempt:

- ~~(Portugal) Pedro Sousa~~

The following players received entry from the qualifying draw:

- (Argentina) Federico Coria
- (Portugal) João Domingues
- (Italy) Gianluca Mager
- (Spain) Pedro Martínez

The following players received entry as a lucky loser:

- (Hungary) Attila Balázs
- (Italy) Federico Gaio

=== Withdrawals ===
Before the tournament

- (Italy) Matteo Berrettini → replaced by (Argentina) Leonardo Mayer
- (Serbia) Laslo Đere → replaced by (Hungary) Attila Balázs
- (Ukraine) Alexandr Dolgopolov → replaced by (Brazil) Thiago Monteiro
- (Chile) Nicolás Jarry (suspension) → replaced by (Spain) Jaume Munar
- (Argentina) Diego Schwartzman → replaced by (Slovakia) Andrej Martin
- (Portugal) Pedro Sousa → replaced by (Italy) Federico Gaio

== Doubles main-draw entrants ==
=== Seeds ===
Country	Player	Country	Player	Rank^{1}	Seed
COL	Juan Sebastián Cabal	COL	Robert Farah	3	1
POL	Łukasz Kubot	BRA	Marcelo Melo	17	2
ESP	Marcel Granollers	ARG	Horacio Zeballos	25	3
CRO	Mate Pavić	BRA	Bruno Soares	38	4

- ^{1} Rankings as of February 10, 2020.

=== Other entrants ===
The following pairs received wildcards into the doubles main draw:

- (Brazil) Orlando Luz / (Brazil) Rafael Matos
- (Brazil) Felipe Meligeni Alves / (Brazil) Thiago Monteiro

The following pair received entry from the qualifying draw:

- (Italy) Salvatore Caruso / (Italy) Federico Gaio

The following pair received entry as lucky losers:

- (Hungary) Attila Balázs / (Brazil) Fernando Romboli

=== Withdrawals ===
Before the tournament

- (Spain) Fernando Verdasco
