= 2020 Bett1Hulks Championship – Doubles =

Doubles
- 2020 Bett1Hulks Championship

Final
- Champions: (South Africa) Raven Klaasen (Japan) Ben McLachlan
- Runners-up: (Germany) Kevin Krawietz (Germany) Andreas Mies
- Score: 6–2, 6–4

Events
| Singles | Doubles |
| Bett1Hulks Championship | · 2021 → |

This is the first edition of the tournament, primarily organised due to the cancellation of many tournaments in 2020, due to the COVID-19 pandemic.

Raven Klaasen and Ben McLachlan won the title, defeating Kevin Krawietz and Andreas Mies in the final, 6–2, 6–4.

== Seeds ==
1. (Poland) Łukasz Kubot / (Brazil) Marcelo Melo (quarterfinals)
2. (Austria) Oliver Marach / (Croatia) Mate Pavić (quarterfinals)
3. (Germany) Kevin Krawietz / (Germany) Andreas Mies (final)
4. (Austria) Jürgen Melzer / (France) Édouard Roger-Vasselin (quarterfinals)

== Draw ==
=== Key ===
- Q = Qualifier
- WC = Wild card
- LL = Lucky loser
- Alt = Alternate
- SE = Special exempt
- PR = Protected ranking
- ITF = ITF entry
- JE = Junior exempt
- w/o = Walkover
- r = Retired
- d = Defaulted
- SR = Special ranking

=== Draw ===
First round
1 | (Poland) Ł Kubot (Brazil) M Melo | 6 | 6
(Israel) J Erlich (Monaco) H Nys | 4 | 2
(New Zealand) M Daniell (Austria) P Oswald | 6 | 6
WC | (Germany) D Altmaier (Germany) O Otte | 4 | 1
3 | (Germany) K Krawietz (Germany) A Mies | w/o
(Spain) A Davidovich Fokina (Spain) F Verdasco
(United Kingdom) D Inglot (Pakistan) A-u-H Qureshi | 4 | 2
WC | (Germany) A Zverev (Germany) M Zverev | 6 | 6
(Bosnia and Herzegovina) T Brkić (Croatia) F Škugor | 3 | 4
(South Africa) R Klaasen (Japan) B McLachlan | 6 | 6
(Mexico) S González (United Kingdom) K Skupski | 1 | 6^{2}
4 | (Austria) J Melzer (France) É Roger-Vasselin | 6 | 7^{7}
(Canada) F Auger-Aliassime (Sweden) R Lindstedt | 6^{3} | 7^{7} | [7]
(Australia) M Purcell (Australia) L Saville | 7^{7} | 6^{1} | [10]
(United States) T Sandgren (India) D Sharan | 4 | 2
2 | (Austria) O Marach (Croatia) M Pavić | 6 | 6

Quarterfinals
1 | (Poland) Ł Kubot (Brazil) M Melo | 2 | 6 | [3]
(New Zealand) M Daniell (Austria) P Oswald | 6 | 4 | [10]
3 | (Germany) K Krawietz (Germany) A Mies | 6 | 7
WC | (Germany) A Zverev (Germany) M Zverev | 4 | 5
(South Africa) R Klaasen (Japan) B McLachlan | 7 | 6
4 | (Austria) J Melzer (France) É Roger-Vasselin | 5 | 4
(Australia) M Purcell (Australia) L Saville | 2 | 6 | [11]
2 | (Austria) O Marach (Croatia) M Pavić | 6 | 3 | [9]

Semifinals
(New Zealand) M Daniell (Austria) P Oswald | 4 | 3
3 | (Germany) K Krawietz (Germany) A Mies | 6 | 6
(South Africa) R Klaasen (Japan) B McLachlan | 7 | 6
(Australia) M Purcell (Australia) L Saville | 5 | 4

Final
3 | (Germany) K Krawietz (Germany) A Mies | 2 | 4
(South Africa) R Klaasen (Japan) B McLachlan | 6 | 6
