= 2020 Abierto Mexicano Telcel – Men's doubles =

Men's doubles
- 2020 Abierto Mexicano Telcel

Final
- Champions: (Poland) Łukasz Kubot (Brazil) Marcelo Melo
- Runners-up: (Colombia) Juan Sebastián Cabal (Colombia) Robert Farah
- Score: 7–6^{(8–6)}, 6–7^{(4–7)}, [11–9]

Events
Singles	men	women
Doubles	men	women
← 2019 ·	Abierto Mexicano Telcel	· 2021 →

Alexander and Mischa Zverev were the defending champions, but lost to Adrian Mannarino and Fabrice Martin in the quarterfinals.

Łukasz Kubot and Marcelo Melo won the title, defeating Juan Sebastián Cabal and Robert Farah in the final, 7–6^{(8–6)}, 6–7^{(4–7)}, [11–9].

== Seeds ==
1. (Colombia) Juan Sebastián Cabal / (Colombia) Robert Farah (final)
2. (Poland) Łukasz Kubot / (Brazil) Marcelo Melo (champions)
3. (Spain) Marcel Granollers / (Argentina) Horacio Zeballos (first round)
4. (Australia) Max Purcell / (Australia) Luke Saville (first round)

== Draw ==
=== Key ===
- Q = Qualifier
- WC = Wild card
- LL = Lucky loser
- Alt = Alternate
- SE = Special exempt
- PR = Protected ranking
- ITF = ITF entry
- JE = Junior exempt
- w/o = Walkover
- r = Retired
- d = Defaulted
- SR = Special ranking

=== Draw ===
First round
1	(Colombia) JS Cabal (Colombia) R Farah	6	7
(United Kingdom) L Bambridge (Japan) B McLachlan	0	5
LL	(Venezuela) LD Martínez (Mexico) MÁ Reyes-Varela	3	6^{3}
(Belgium) S Gillé (Belgium) J Vliegen	6	7^{7}
3	(Spain) M Granollers (Argentina) H Zeballos	6	4	[6]
(France) A Mannarino (France) F Martin	3	6	[10]
WC	(Germany) A Zverev (Germany) M Zverev	6	6
Q	(United States) N Monroe (United States) J Withrow	3	3
(Canada) F Auger-Aliassime (Monaco) H Nys	3	2
(Serbia) N Ćaćić (Serbia) D Lajović	6	6
(Mexico) S González (United Kingdom) K Skupski	4	7^{7}	[10]
4	(Australia) M Purcell (Australia) L Saville	6	6^{0}	[2]
(New Zealand) M Daniell (Austria) P Oswald	5	6	[10]
(Bulgaria) G Dimitrov (United States) T Fritz	7	3	[12]
WC	(Spain) F López (Spain) M López	5	4
2	(Poland) Ł Kubot (Brazil) M Melo	7	6

Quarterfinals
1	(Colombia) JS Cabal (Colombia) R Farah	6^{2}	6	[10]
(Belgium) S Gillé (Belgium) J Vliegen	7^{7}	4	[8]
(France) A Mannarino (France) F Martin	6	6
WC	(Germany) A Zverev (Germany) M Zverev	1	4
(Serbia) N Ćaćić (Serbia) D Lajović	4	6	[10]
(Mexico) S González (United Kingdom) K Skupski	6	4	[2]
(Bulgaria) G Dimitrov (United States) T Fritz
2	(Poland) Ł Kubot (Brazil) M Melo	w/o

Semifinals
1	(Colombia) JS Cabal (Colombia) R Farah	6	6
(France) A Mannarino (France) F Martin	4	2
(Serbia) N Ćaćić (Serbia) D Lajović	7^{8}	0	[6]
2	(Poland) Ł Kubot (Brazil) M Melo	6^{6}	6	[10]

Final
1	(Colombia) JS Cabal (Colombia) R Farah	6^{6}	7^{7}	[9]
2	(Poland) Ł Kubot (Brazil) M Melo	7^{8}	6^{4}	[11]

== Qualifying ==
=== Seeds ===
1. (Moldova) Radu Albot / (United States) Austin Krajicek (first round)
2. (United States) Nicholas Monroe / (United States) Jackson Withrow (qualified)

=== Qualifiers ===
1. (United States) Nicholas Monroe / (United States) Jackson Withrow

=== Lucky losers ===
1. (Venezuela) Luis David Martínez / (Mexico) Miguel Ángel Reyes-Varela

=== Qualifying draw ===
First round
1	(Moldova) Radu Albot (United States) Austin Krajicek	4	6	[13]
(Venezuela) Luis David Martínez (Mexico) Miguel Ángel Reyes-Varela	6	2	[15]
WC	(United States) Robert Galloway (Mexico) Hans Hach Verdugo	6	4	[7]
2	(United States) Nicholas Monroe (United States) Jackson Withrow	3	6	[10]

Qualifying competition
(Venezuela) Luis David Martínez (Mexico) Miguel Ángel Reyes-Varela	3	4
2	(United States) Nicholas Monroe (United States) Jackson Withrow	6	6
