= 2020 Bett1Hulks Championship – Singles =

Singles
- 2020 Bett1Hulks Championship

Final
- Champion: (Germany) Alexander Zverev
- Runner-up: (Argentina) Diego Schwartzman
- Score: 6–2, 6–1

Details
- Draw: 28
- Seeds: 8

Events
Singles	Doubles
Bett1Hulks Championship	· 2021 →

First seed Alexander Zverev won the tournament, defeating second seed Diego Schwartzman 6–2, 6–1 in the final. This was the first edition of the tournament, primarily organised due to the cancellation of many tournaments in 2020, due to the COVID-19 pandemic.

== Seeds ==
The top four seeds received a bye into the second round.

1. (Germany) Alexander Zverev (champion)
2. (Argentina) Diego Schwartzman (final)
3. (Canada) Denis Shapovalov (second round)
4. ~~(Spain) Roberto Bautista Agut~~ (withdrew due to elbow injury)
5. (Canada) Félix Auger-Aliassime (semifinals)
6. ~~(Poland) Hubert Hurkacz~~ (withdrew due to food poisoning)
7. (Germany) Jan-Lennard Struff (second round)
8. (France) Adrian Mannarino (quarterfinals)
9. (Croatia) Marin Čilić (first round)

== Draw ==
=== Key ===
- Q = Qualifier
- WC = Wild card
- LL = Lucky loser
- Alt = Alternate
- SE = Special exempt
- PR = Protected ranking
- ITF = ITF entry
- JE = Junior exempt
- w/o = Walkover
- r = Retired
- d = Defaulted
- SR = Special ranking

=== Finals ===
Semifinals
1	(Germany) Alexander Zverev	7^{7}	6
WC	(Italy) Jannik Sinner	6^{3}	3
5	(Canada) Félix Auger-Aliassime	4	7	4
2	(Argentina) Diego Schwartzman	6	5	6

Final
1	(Germany) Alexander Zverev	6	6
2	(Argentina) Diego Schwartzman	2	1

=== Top half ===
First round
(Spain) F Verdasco	4	2
(Australia) J Millman	6	6
LL	(India) S Nagal	6	6^{4}	1
(Serbia) M Kecmanović	4	7^{7}	6
LL	(Australia) A Popyrin	2	2
8	(France) A Mannarino	6	6
(Australia) J Thompson	3	5
(France) G Simon	6	7
(United States) T Sandgren	3	6	3
Q	(France) P-H Herbert	6	3	6
WC	(Italy) J Sinner	6	6
LL	(Australia) J Duckworth	1	2

Second round
1	(Germany) A Zverev	6	3	6
(Australia) J Millman	0	6	3
(Serbia) M Kecmanović	3	3
8	(France) A Mannarino	6	6
3	(Canada) D Shapovalov	1	6	2
(France) G Simon	6	4	6
Q	(France) P-H Herbert	3	1
WC	(Italy) J Sinner	6	6

Quarterfinals
1	(Germany) A Zverev	6	6^{5}	6
8	(France) A Mannarino	4	7^{7}	4
(France) G Simon	3	6	4
WC	(Italy) J Sinner	6	0	6

Semifinals
1	(Germany) A Zverev	7^{7}	6
WC	(Italy) J Sinner	6^{3}	3

=== Bottom half ===
First round
7	(Germany) J-L Struff	6	6
SE	(Italy) M Cecchinato	3	1
(Japan) Y Nishioka	6	6
(United Kingdom) K Edmund	4	0
Q	(Belarus) E Gerasimov	6	6
WC	(Germany) D Altmaier	1	0
9	(Croatia) M Čilić	6^{3}	4
(United States) S Johnson	7^{7}	6
Q	(Bosnia and Herzegovina) D Džumhur	2	3
(Spain) A Davidovich Fokina	6	6
LL	(Germany) O Otte	6	6
Q	(Austria) D Novak	3	2

Second round
7	(Germany) J-L Struff	6	3	6^{3}
(Japan) Y Nishioka	2	6	7^{7}
Q	(Belarus) E Gerasimov	6	6^{2}	6^{4}
5	(Canada) F Auger-Aliassime	4	7^{7}	7^{7}
(United States) S Johnson	6^{3}	3
(Spain) A Davidovich Fokina	7^{7}	6
LL	(Germany) O Otte	3	2
2	(Argentina) D Schwartzman	6	6

Quarterfinals
(Japan) Y Nishioka	3	4
5	(Canada) F Auger-Aliassime	6	6
(Spain) A Davidovich Fokina	6	6^{3}	1
2	(Argentina) D Schwartzman	2	7^{7}	6

Semifinals
5	(Canada) F Auger-Aliassime	4	7	4
2	(Argentina) D Schwartzman	6	5	6

== Qualifying ==
=== Seeds ===
1. (France) Pierre-Hugues Herbert (qualified)
2. (Moldova) Radu Albot (first round)
3. (Belarus) Egor Gerasimov (qualified)
4. (Australia) James Duckworth (qualifying competition, lucky loser)
5. (Austria) Dennis Novak (qualified)
6. (Slovakia) Norbert Gombos (first round)
7. (Australia) Alexei Popyrin (qualifying competition, lucky loser)
8. (Bosnia and Herzegovina) Damir Džumhur (qualified)

=== Qualifiers ===
1. (France) Pierre-Hugues Herbert
2. (Bosnia and Herzegovina) Damir Džumhur
3. (Belarus) Egor Gerasimov
4. (Austria) Dennis Novak

=== Lucky losers ===
1. (India) Sumit Nagal
2. (Australia) Alexei Popyrin
3. (Australia) James Duckworth
4. (Germany) Oscar Otte

=== Qualifying draw ===
==== First qualifier ====
First round
1/Alt	(France) Pierre-Hugues Herbert	6	6
(Germany) Rudolf Molleker	3	0
(India) Sumit Nagal	7	6
6	(Slovakia) Norbert Gombos	5	4

Qualifying competition
1/Alt	(France) Pierre-Hugues Herbert	6	6
(India) Sumit Nagal	2	2

==== Second qualifier ====
First round
2	(Moldova) Radu Albot	6^{5}	4
(Germany) Oscar Otte	7^{7}	6
(Australia) Marc Polmans	2	1
8	(Bosnia and Herzegovina) Damir Džumhur	6	6

Qualifying competition
(Germany) Oscar Otte	3^{r}
8	(Bosnia and Herzegovina) Damir Džumhur	4

==== Third qualifier ====
First round
3	(Belarus) Egor Gerasimov	6	4	6
WC	(Germany) Oscar Moraing	1	6	4
(United States) J. J. Wolf	3	6	3
7	(Australia) Alexei Popyrin	6	4	6

Qualifying competition
3	(Belarus) Egor Gerasimov	6	1	6
7	(Australia) Alexei Popyrin	2	6	3

==== Fourth qualifier ====
First round
4	(Australia) James Duckworth	6	5	6
WC	(Germany) Mischa Zverev	3	7	2
(Australia) Max Purcell	6^{3}	7^{7}	6^{3}
5	(Austria) Dennis Novak	7^{7}	6^{3}	7^{7}

Qualifying competition
4	(Australia) James Duckworth	4	5
5	(Austria) Dennis Novak	6	7
