= 2020 Rio Open – Doubles =

Doubles
- 2020 Rio Open

Final
- Champions: (Spain) Marcel Granollers (Argentina) Horacio Zeballos
- Runners-up: (Italy) Salvatore Caruso (Italy) Federico Gaio
- Score: 6–4, 5–7, [10–7]

Details
- Draw: 16
- Seeds: 4

Events
Singles	Doubles
- Rio Open

Máximo González and Nicolás Jarry were the defending champions, but Jarry could not compete due to a provisional suspension. González played alongside Fabrice Martin but lost in the quarterfinals to Marcel Granollers and Horacio Zeballos.

Granollers and Zeballos went on to win the title, defeating Salvatore Caruso and Federico Gaio in the final, 6–4, 5–7, [10–7].

== Seeds ==
1. (Colombia) Juan Sebastián Cabal / (Colombia) Robert Farah (first round)
2. (Poland) Łukasz Kubot / (Brazil) Marcelo Melo (semifinals)
3. (Spain) Marcel Granollers / (Argentina) Horacio Zeballos (champions)
4. (Croatia) Mate Pavić / (Brazil) Bruno Soares (quarterfinals)

== Draw ==
Key

- Q = Qualifier
- WC = Wild card
- LL = Lucky loser
- Alt = Alternate
- ITF = ITF entry
- PR = Protected ranking
- SR = Special ranking
- SE = Special exempt
- JE = Junior exempt
- JR = Junior Accelerator Programme entrant
- CO = College Accelerator Programme entrant
- NG = Next Gen Accelerator Program entrant
- w/o = Walkover
- r = Retired
- d = Defaulted

=== Draw ===
First round
1	(Colombia) JS Cabal (Colombia) R Farah	1	6	[8]
WC	(Brazil) O Luz (Brazil) R Matos	6	4	[10]
(Belgium) S Gillé (Belgium) J Vliegen	6^{6}	6	[3]
WC	(Brazil) F Meligeni Alves (Brazil) T Monteiro	7^{8}	4	[10]
3	(Spain) M Granollers (Argentina) H Zeballos	6	6
(Argentina) JI Londero (Spain) A Ramos Viñolas	3	2
(Argentina) M González (France) F Martin	6	7
(Spain) P Andújar (Spain) R Carballés Baena	4	5
Q	(Italy) S Caruso (Italy) F Gaio	6	6
(Uruguay) A Behar (Ecuador) G Escobar	4	3
(Argentina) A Molteni (Italy) L Sonego	7^{7}	3	[9]
4	(Croatia) M Pavić (Brazil) B Soares	6^{4}	6	[11]
(Czech Republic) R Jebavý (Slovakia) I Zelenay	5	6	[10]
(Brazil) M Demoliner (Netherlands) M Middelkoop	7	3	[8]
LL	(Hungary) A Balázs (Brazil) F Romboli	3	5
2	(Poland) Ł Kubot (Brazil) M Melo	6	7

Quarterfinals
WC	(Brazil) O Luz (Brazil) R Matos	3	6^{7}
WC	(Brazil) F Meligeni Alves (Brazil) T Monteiro	6	7^{9}
3	(Spain) M Granollers (Argentina) H Zeballos	6	6^{3}	[10]
(Argentina) M González (France) F Martin	4	7^{7}	[8]
Q	(Italy) S Caruso (Italy) F Gaio	6	4	[10]
4	(Croatia) M Pavić (Brazil) B Soares	4	6	[4]
(Czech Republic) R Jebavý (Slovakia) I Zelenay	4	2
2	(Poland) Ł Kubot (Brazil) M Melo	6	6

Semifinals
WC	(Brazil) F Meligeni Alves (Brazil) T Monteiro	6^{6}	4
3	(Spain) M Granollers (Argentina) H Zeballos	7^{8}	6
Q	(Italy) S Caruso (Italy) F Gaio	6	3	[10]
2	(Poland) Ł Kubot (Brazil) M Melo	3	6	[4]

Final
3	(Spain) M Granollers (Argentina) H Zeballos	6	5	[10]
Q	(Italy) S Caruso (Italy) F Gaio	4	7	[7]

== Qualifying ==
=== Seeds ===
1. (Bolivia) Hugo Dellien / (Argentina) Leonardo Mayer (first round)
2. (Hungary) Attila Balázs / (Brazil) Fernando Romboli (qualifying competition, lucky losers)

=== Qualifiers ===
1. (Italy) Salvatore Caruso / (Italy) Federico Gaio

=== Lucky losers ===
1. (Hungary) Attila Balázs / (Brazil) Fernando Romboli

=== Qualifying draw ===
First round
1	(Bolivia) Hugo Dellien (Argentina) Leonardo Mayer	2	2
(Italy) Salvatore Caruso (Italy) Federico Gaio	6	6
WC	(Brazil) João Menezes (Brazil) Thiago Seyboth Wild	6	6^{4}	[8]
2	(Hungary) Attila Balázs (Brazil) Fernando Romboli	1	7^{7}	[10]

Qualifying competition
(Italy) Salvatore Caruso (Italy) Federico Gaio	6	6
2	(Hungary) Attila Balázs (Brazil) Fernando Romboli	3	4
