= 2020 Rio Open – Singles =

Singles
- 2020 Rio Open

Final
- Champion: (Chile) Cristian Garín
- Runner-up: (Italy) Gianluca Mager
- Score: 7–6^{(7–3)}, 7–5

Details
- Draw: 32 (4 Q / 3 WC )
- Seeds: 8

Events
Singles	Doubles
- Rio Open

Cristian Garín won the title, defeating Gianluca Mager in the final, 7–6^{(7–3)}, 7–5.

Laslo Đere was the defending champion, but withdrew with an abdominal injury before the tournament began.

This was the first clay court tournament where players were allowed to use the challenge system.

This tournament was notable for being the ATP debut of future world No.1 Carlos Alcaraz. He received a wildcard into the main draw and reached the second round, after a win over compatriot Albert Ramos Viñolas.

== Seeds ==
1. (Austria) Dominic Thiem (quarterfinals)
2. (Serbia) Dušan Lajović (second round)
3. (Chile) Cristian Garín (champion)
4. (Argentina) Guido Pella (first round)
5. (Croatia) Borna Ćorić (semifinals)
6. (Serbia) Laslo Đere (withdrew)
7. (Spain) Albert Ramos Viñolas (first round)
8. (Norway) Casper Ruud (first round)
9. (Spain) Fernando Verdasco (first round)

== Draw ==
Key

- Q = Qualifier
- WC = Wild card
- LL = Lucky loser
- Alt = Alternate
- ITF = ITF entry
- PR = Protected ranking
- SR = Special ranking
- SE = Special exempt
- JE = Junior exempt
- JR = Junior Accelerator Programme entrant
- CO = College Accelerator Programme entrant
- NG = Next Gen Accelerator Program entrant
- w/o = Walkover
- r = Retired
- d = Defaulted

=== Finals ===
Semifinals
Q	(Italy) Gianluca Mager	7^{7}	4	7^{7}
LL	(Hungary) Attila Balázs	6^{4}	6	6^{2}
3	(Chile) Cristian Garín	6	7
5	(Croatia) Borna Ćorić	4	5

Final
Q	(Italy) Gianluca Mager	6^{3}	5
3	(Chile) Cristian Garín	7^{7}	7

=== Top half ===
First round
1	(Austria) D Thiem	6	4	6
WC	(Brazil) F Meligeni Alves	2	6	1
(Spain) J Munar	7	6
(Italy) S Caruso	5	4
Q	(Portugal) J Domingues	7^{10}	6
LL	(Italy) F Gaio	6^{8}	4
Q	(Italy) G Mager	7^{7}	7
8	(Norway) C Ruud	6^{4}	5
4	(Argentina) G Pella	7	4	6^{3}
(Brazil) T Monteiro	5	6	7^{7}
LL	(Hungary) A Balázs	6	6
(Uruguay) P Cuevas	4	3
Q	(Spain) P Martínez	3	6	7
(Bolivia) H Dellien	6	2	5
(Spain) P Andújar	6	6
9	(Spain) F Verdasco	3	3

Second round
1	(Austria) D Thiem	6^{5}	6	6
(Spain) J Munar	7^{7}	3	4
Q	(Portugal) J Domingues	3	6^{5}
Q	(Italy) G Mager	6	7^{7}
(Brazil) T Monteiro	6	1	4
LL	(Hungary) A Balázs	1	6	6
Q	(Spain) P Martínez	6	6
(Spain) P Andújar	1	4

Quarterfinals
1	(Austria) D Thiem	6^{4}	5
Q	(Italy) G Mager	7^{7}	7
LL	(Hungary) A Balázs	2	6	6
Q	(Spain) P Martínez	6	4	2

Semifinals
Q	(Italy) G Mager	7^{7}	4	7^{7}
LL	(Hungary) A Balázs	6^{4}	6	6^{2}

=== Bottom half ===
First round
7	(Spain) A Ramos Viñolas	6^{2}	6	6^{2}
WC	(Spain) C Alcaraz	7^{7}	4	7^{7}
(France) C Moutet	6	6^{1}	6^{3}
Q	(Argentina) F Coria	1	7^{7}	7^{7}
(Spain) R Carballés Baena	2	4
(Argentina) F Delbonis	6	6
(Slovakia) A Martin	6	5	6^{5}
3	(Chile) C Garín	4	7	7^{7}
5	(Croatia) B Ćorić	7^{7}	7
(Argentina) JI Londero	6^{5}	5
(Spain) A Davidovich Fokina	7	6^{3}	5
WC	(Brazil) T Seyboth Wild	5	7^{7}	7
(Argentina) L Mayer	1	7	4
(Italy) L Sonego	6	5	6
(Italy) M Cecchinato	4	7^{7}	1
2	(Serbia) D Lajović	6	6^{4}	6

Second round
WC	(Spain) C Alcaraz	4	6	4
Q	(Argentina) F Coria	6	4	6
(Argentina) F Delbonis	4	3
3	(Chile) C Garín	6	6
5	(Croatia) B Ćorić	6	1	7^{7}
WC	(Brazil) T Seyboth Wild	3	6	6^{5}
(Italy) L Sonego	7^{7}	7^{7}
2	(Serbia) D Lajović	6^{5}	6^{5}

Quarterfinals
Q	(Argentina) F Coria	6	3	5
3	(Chile) C Garín	2	6	7
5	(Croatia) B Ćorić	7^{7}	6
(Italy) L Sonego	6^{5}	3

Semifinals
3	(Chile) C Garín	6	7
5	(Croatia) B Ćorić	4	5

== Qualifying ==
=== Seeds ===
1. (Slovakia) Andrej Martin (moved to main draw)
2. (Hungary) Attila Balázs (qualifying competition, lucky loser)
3. (Argentina) Federico Coria (qualified)
4. (Italy) Federico Gaio (qualifying competition, lucky loser)
5. (Italy) Gianluca Mager (qualified)
6. (Slovakia) Jozef Kovalík (qualifying competition)
7. (Spain) Pedro Martínez (qualified)
8. (Italy) Alessandro Giannessi (first round, retired)

=== Qualifiers ===
1. (Spain) Pedro Martínez
2. (Italy) Gianluca Mager
3. (Argentina) Federico Coria
4. (Portugal) João Domingues

=== Lucky losers ===
1. (Hungary) Attila Balázs
2. (Italy) Federico Gaio

=== Qualifying draw ===
==== First qualifier ====
First round
Alt	(Spain) Mario Vilella Martínez	6^{4}	3
(Slovakia) Filip Horanský	7^{7}	6
WC	(Brazil) Mateus Alves	2	3
7	(Spain) Pedro Martínez	6	6

Qualifying competition
(Slovakia) Filip Horanský	4	2
7	(Spain) Pedro Martínez	6	6

==== Second qualifier ====
First round
2	(Hungary) Attila Balázs	6	6
WC	(Brazil) Orlando Luz	3	3
(Argentina) Andrea Collarini	1	2
5	(Italy) Gianluca Mager	6	6

Qualifying competition
2	(Hungary) Attila Balázs	0	2
5	(Italy) Gianluca Mager	6	6

==== Third qualifier ====
First round
3	(Argentina) Federico Coria	7^{7}	6
(Spain) Carlos Taberner	6^{5}	1
WC	(Brazil) Pedro Boscardin Dias	3	1
6	(Slovakia) Jozef Kovalík	6	6

Qualifying competition
3	(Argentina) Federico Coria	6	6
6	(Slovakia) Jozef Kovalík	2	4

==== Fourth qualifier ====
First round
4	(Italy) Federico Gaio	6^{5}	6	6
(Brazil) João Menezes	7^{7}	4	3
(Portugal) João Domingues	7	3
8	(Italy) Alessandro Giannessi	5	1^{r}

Qualifying competition
4	(Italy) Federico Gaio	6	6^{5}	5
(Portugal) João Domingues	3	7^{7}	7
