= 2020 ATP Tour =

Men's tennis circuit

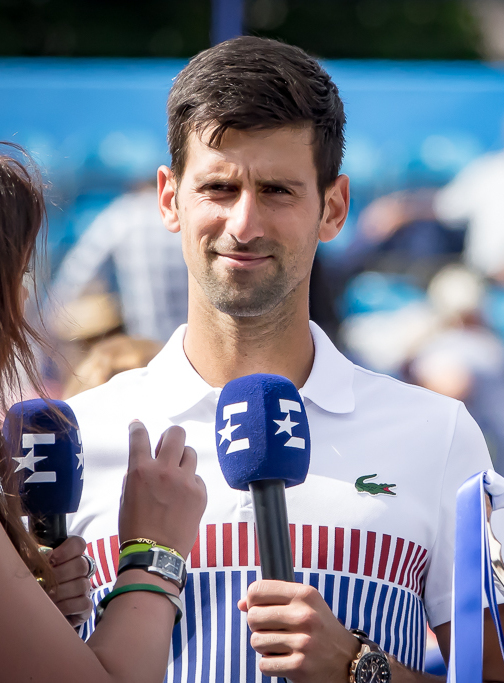
- Novak Djokovic finished the year as world No. 1 for a record-equaling sixth time, tying Pete Sampras' achievement. He won four tournaments during the season, including a major at the Australian Open. He also won two Masters 1000 events and finished runner-up at another major, the French Open.

Details
- Duration: 3 Jan 2020 – 22 Nov 2020
- Edition: 51st
- Tournaments: 33
- Categories: Grand Slam (3); ATP Finals; ATP 1000 (3); ATP 500 (7); ATP 250 (18); ATP Cup

Achievements (singles)
- Most titles: (Russia) Andrey Rublev (5)
- Most finals: (Serbia) Novak Djokovic (Russia) Andrey Rublev (5)
- Prize money leader: (Serbia) Novak Djokovic ($6,435,158)
- Points leader: (Serbia) Novak Djokovic (6,455)

Awards
- Player of the year: (Serbia) Novak Djokovic
- Doubles team of the year: (Croatia) Mate Pavić (Brazil) Bruno Soares
- Most improved player of the year: (Russia) Andrey Rublev
- Newcomer of the year: (Spain) Carlos Alcaraz
- Comeback player of the year: (Canada) Vasek Pospisil

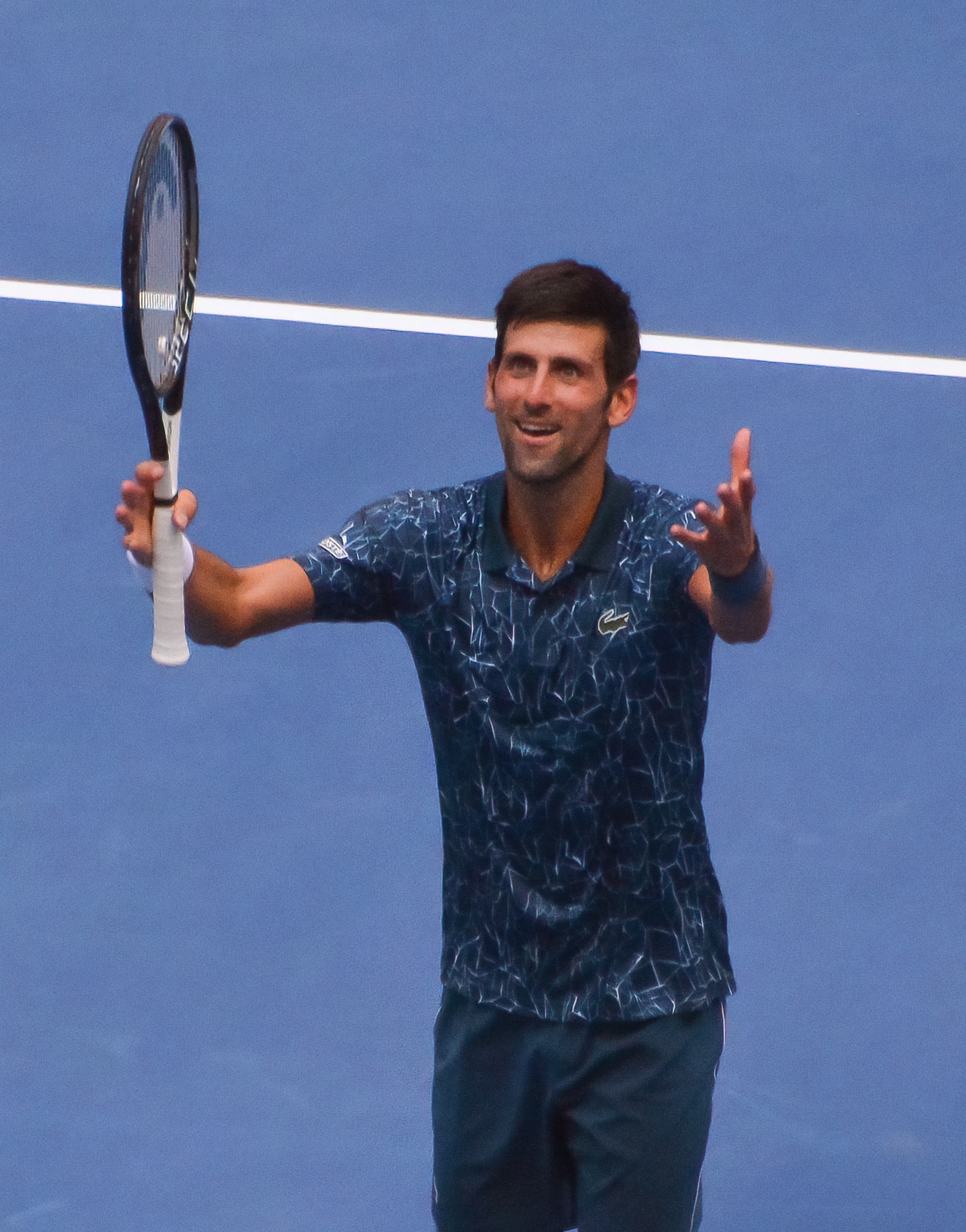
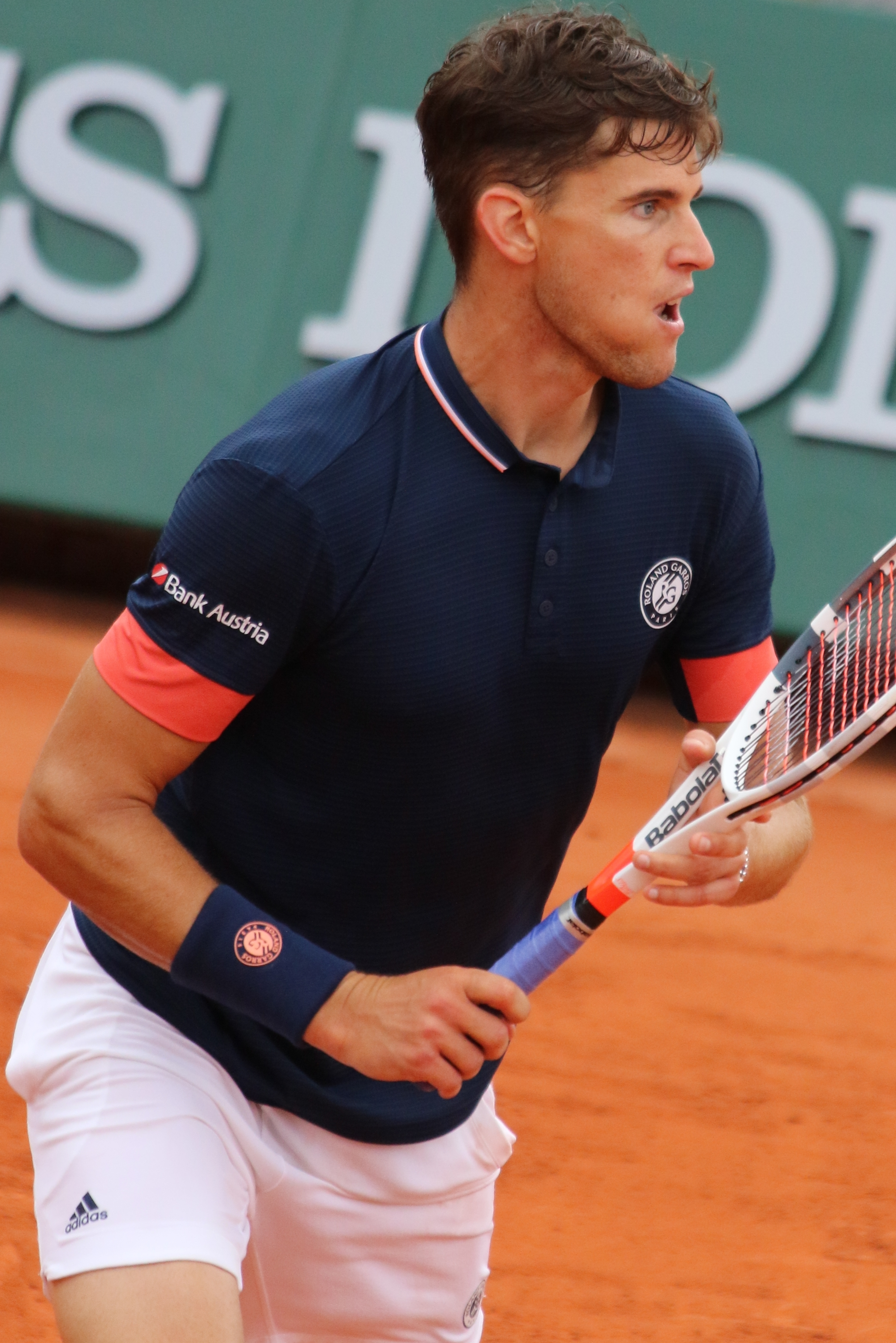
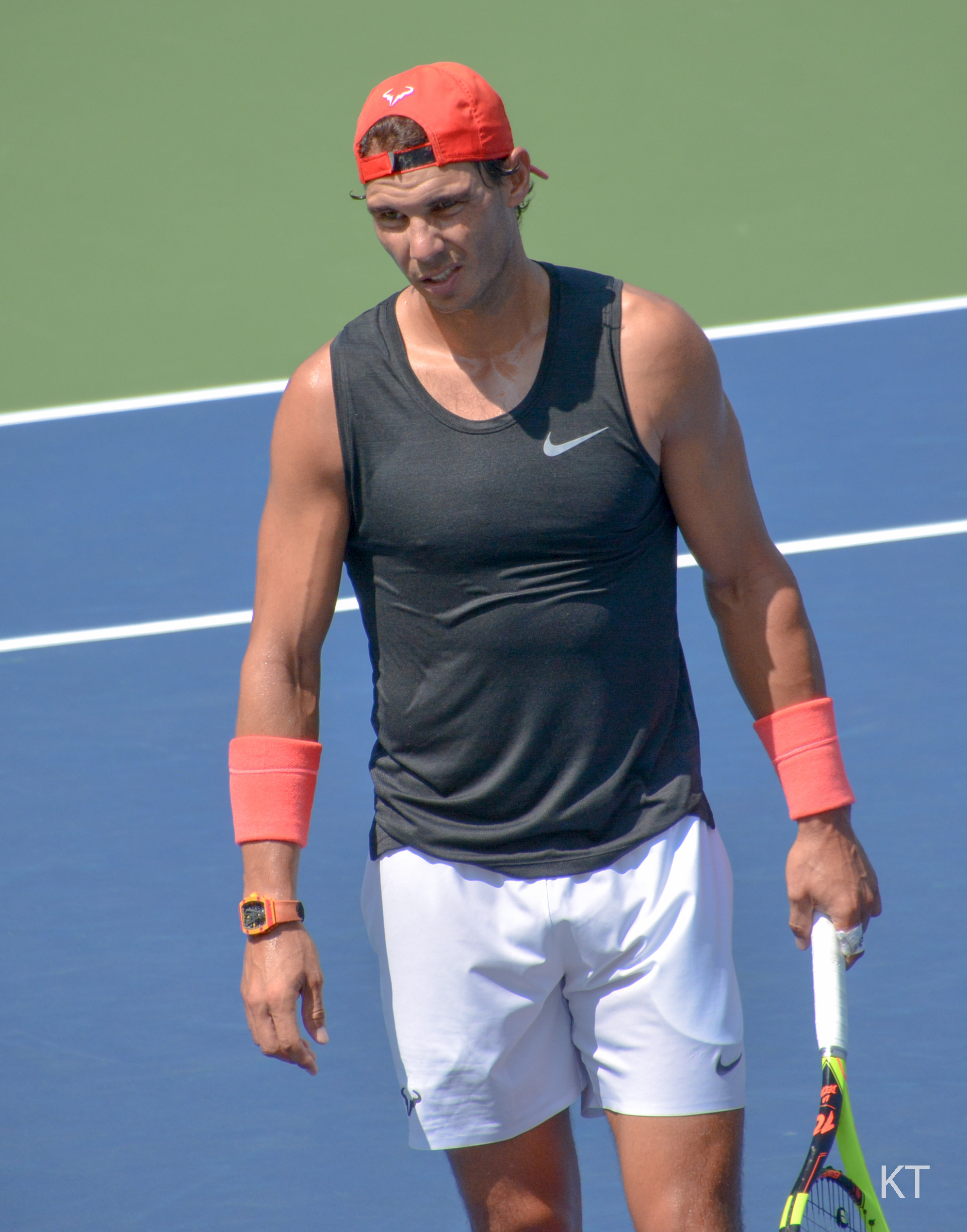
Novak Djokovic won a record-extending eighth Australian Open and 17th major overall, defeating Dominic Thiem in the final. Thiem defeated Alexander Zverev in a fifth-set tiebreaker to win his first major title at the US Open, becoming the first male player born in the 1990s to win the major and the first outside of the Big Four since 2016. Rafael Nadal defeated Djokovic to win a record-extending 13th French Open and record-equaling 20th major title, tying Roger Federer's all-time achievement; he did not drop a set at the tournament for a fourth time.

The 2020 ATP Tour was the global elite men's professional tennis circuit organised by the Association of Tennis Professionals (ATP) for the 2020 tennis season. The 2020 ATP Tour calendar was composed of the Grand Slam tournaments (supervised by the International Tennis Federation (ITF)), the ATP Finals, the ATP Masters 1000, the ATP Cup, the ATP 500 series, the ATP 250 series, and the Davis Cup (organised by the ITF). Also included in the 2020 calendar were the tennis events at the Next Generation ATP Finals, and the Laver Cup, neither of which distributed ranking points. Year disrupted by COVID-19 pandemic, thus making the season pandemic-shortened. Several tournaments were suspended or postponed due to this, including the Summer Olympics in Tokyo. On 17 June 2020, ATP issued the revised calendar for Tour resumption.

== Schedule ==
This is the complete schedule of events on the 2020 calendar.

Key
Grand Slam
ATP Finals
ATP Masters 1000
ATP 500
ATP 250
Team events

=== January ===
Week	Tournament	Champions	Runners-up	Semifinalists	Quarterfinalists
6 Jan	ATP Cup; Brisbane, Perth, Sydney, Australia; Hard – $15,000,000 – 24 teams	Serbia; 2–1	Spain	Russia; Australia	Canada; Argentina; Great Britain; Belgium
6 Jan	Qatar Open; Doha, Qatar; ATP 250; Hard – $1,465,260 – 28S/16Q/16D; Singles – Doubles	(Russia) Andrey Rublev; 6–2, 7–6^{(7–3)}	(France) Corentin Moutet	(Switzerland) Stan Wawrinka (Serbia) Miomir Kecmanović	(Slovenia) Aljaž Bedene (Spain) Fernando Verdasco (Hungary) Márton Fucsovics (France) Pierre-Hugues Herbert
6 Jan	Qatar Open; Doha, Qatar; ATP 250; Hard – $1,465,260 – 28S/16Q/16D; Singles – Doubles	(India) Rohan Bopanna (Netherlands) Wesley Koolhof; 3–6, 6–2, [10–6]	(United Kingdom) Luke Bambridge (Mexico) Santiago González	(Switzerland) Stan Wawrinka (Serbia) Miomir Kecmanović	(Slovenia) Aljaž Bedene (Spain) Fernando Verdasco (Hungary) Márton Fucsovics (France) Pierre-Hugues Herbert
13 Jan	Adelaide International; Adelaide, Australia; ATP 250; Hard – $610,010 – 28S/16Q/16D; Singles – Doubles	(Russia) Andrey Rublev; 6–3, 6–0	(South Africa) Lloyd Harris	(United States) Tommy Paul (Canada) Félix Auger-Aliassime	(Spain) Albert Ramos Viñolas (Spain) Pablo Carreño Busta (United Kingdom) Dan Evans (Australia) Alex Bolt
13 Jan	Adelaide International; Adelaide, Australia; ATP 250; Hard – $610,010 – 28S/16Q/16D; Singles – Doubles	(Argentina) Máximo González (France) Fabrice Martin; 7–6^{(14–12)}, 6–3	(Croatia) Ivan Dodig (Slovakia) Filip Polášek	(United States) Tommy Paul (Canada) Félix Auger-Aliassime	(Spain) Albert Ramos Viñolas (Spain) Pablo Carreño Busta (United Kingdom) Dan Evans (Australia) Alex Bolt
13 Jan	Auckland Classic; Auckland, New Zealand; ATP 250; Hard – $610,010 – 28S/16Q/16D; Singles – Doubles	(France) Ugo Humbert; 7–6^{(7–2)}, 3–6, 7–6^{(7–5)}	(France) Benoît Paire	(Poland) Hubert Hurkacz (United States) John Isner	(Spain) Feliciano López (Australia) John Millman (United Kingdom) Kyle Edmund (Canada) Denis Shapovalov
13 Jan	Auckland Classic; Auckland, New Zealand; ATP 250; Hard – $610,010 – 28S/16Q/16D; Singles – Doubles	(United Kingdom) Luke Bambridge (Japan) Ben McLachlan; 7–6^{(7–3)}, 6–3	(New Zealand) Marcus Daniell (Austria) Philipp Oswald	(Poland) Hubert Hurkacz (United States) John Isner	(Spain) Feliciano López (Australia) John Millman (United Kingdom) Kyle Edmund (Canada) Denis Shapovalov
20 Jan; 27 Jan	Australian Open; Melbourne, Australia; Grand Slam; Hard – A$32,505,000; 128S/128Q/64D/32X; Singles – Doubles – Mixed doubles	(Serbia) Novak Djokovic; 6–4, 4–6, 2–6, 6–3, 6–4	(Austria) Dominic Thiem	(Germany) Alexander Zverev (Switzerland) Roger Federer	(Spain) Rafael Nadal (Switzerland) Stan Wawrinka (United States) Tennys Sandgren (Canada) Milos Raonic
20 Jan; 27 Jan	Australian Open; Melbourne, Australia; Grand Slam; Hard – A$32,505,000; 128S/128Q/64D/32X; Singles – Doubles – Mixed doubles	(United States) Rajeev Ram (United Kingdom) Joe Salisbury; 6–4, 6–2	(Australia) Max Purcell (Australia) Luke Saville	(Germany) Alexander Zverev (Switzerland) Roger Federer	(Spain) Rafael Nadal (Switzerland) Stan Wawrinka (United States) Tennys Sandgren (Canada) Milos Raonic
20 Jan; 27 Jan	Australian Open; Melbourne, Australia; Grand Slam; Hard – A$32,505,000; 128S/128Q/64D/32X; Singles – Doubles – Mixed doubles	(Czech Republic) Barbora Krejčíková (Croatia) Nikola Mektić; 5–7, 6–4, [10–1]	(United States) Bethanie Mattek-Sands (United Kingdom) Jamie Murray	(Germany) Alexander Zverev (Switzerland) Roger Federer	(Spain) Rafael Nadal (Switzerland) Stan Wawrinka (United States) Tennys Sandgren (Canada) Milos Raonic

=== February ===
Week	Tournament	Champions	Runners-up	Semifinalists	Quarterfinalists
3 Feb	Open Sud de France; Montpellier, France; ATP 250; Hard (i) – €606,350 – 28S/16Q/16D; Singles – Doubles	(France) Gaël Monfils; 7–5, 6–3	(Canada) Vasek Pospisil	(Serbia) Filip Krajinović (Belgium) David Goffin	(Slovakia) Norbert Gombos (France) Grégoire Barrère (France) Richard Gasquet (France) Pierre-Hugues Herbert
3 Feb	Open Sud de France; Montpellier, France; ATP 250; Hard (i) – €606,350 – 28S/16Q/16D; Singles – Doubles	(Serbia) Nikola Ćaćić (Croatia) Mate Pavić; 6–4, 6–7^{(4–7)}, [10–4]	(United Kingdom) Dominic Inglot (Pakistan) Aisam-ul-Haq Qureshi	(Serbia) Filip Krajinović (Belgium) David Goffin	(Slovakia) Norbert Gombos (France) Grégoire Barrère (France) Richard Gasquet (France) Pierre-Hugues Herbert
3 Feb	Maharashtra Open; Pune, India; ATP 250; Hard – $610,010 – 28S/16Q/16D; Singles – Doubles	(Czech Republic) Jiří Veselý; 7–6^{(7–2)}, 5–7, 6–3	(Belarus) Egor Gerasimov	(Australia) James Duckworth (Lithuania) Ričardas Berankis	(Italy) Roberto Marcora (South Korea) Kwon Soon-woo (Belarus) Ilya Ivashka (Japan) Yūichi Sugita
3 Feb	Maharashtra Open; Pune, India; ATP 250; Hard – $610,010 – 28S/16Q/16D; Singles – Doubles	(Sweden) André Göransson (Indonesia) Christopher Rungkat; 6–2, 3–6, [10–8]	(Israel) Jonathan Erlich (Belarus) Andrei Vasilevski	(Australia) James Duckworth (Lithuania) Ričardas Berankis	(Italy) Roberto Marcora (South Korea) Kwon Soon-woo (Belarus) Ilya Ivashka (Japan) Yūichi Sugita
3 Feb	Córdoba Open; Córdoba, Argentina; ATP 250; Clay (red) – $610,010 – 28S/16Q/16D; Singles – Doubles	(Chile) Cristian Garín; 2–6, 6–4, 6–0	(Argentina) Diego Schwartzman	(Serbia) Laslo Đere (Slovakia) Andrej Martin	(Spain) Albert Ramos Viñolas (Argentina) Juan Ignacio Londero (Uruguay) Pablo Cuevas (France) Corentin Moutet
3 Feb	Córdoba Open; Córdoba, Argentina; ATP 250; Clay (red) – $610,010 – 28S/16Q/16D; Singles – Doubles	(Brazil) Marcelo Demoliner (Netherlands) Matwé Middelkoop; 6–3, 7–6^{(7–4)}	(Argentina) Leonardo Mayer (Argentina) Andrés Molteni	(Serbia) Laslo Đere (Slovakia) Andrej Martin	(Spain) Albert Ramos Viñolas (Argentina) Juan Ignacio Londero (Uruguay) Pablo Cuevas (France) Corentin Moutet
10 Feb	Rotterdam Open; Rotterdam, Netherlands; ATP 500; Hard (i) – €2,155,295 – 32S/16Q/16D; Singles – Doubles	(France) Gaël Monfils; 6–2, 6–4	(Canada) Félix Auger-Aliassime	(Serbia) Filip Krajinović (Spain) Pablo Carreño Busta	(Russia) Andrey Rublev (United Kingdom) Dan Evans (Italy) Jannik Sinner (Slovenia) Aljaž Bedene
10 Feb	Rotterdam Open; Rotterdam, Netherlands; ATP 500; Hard (i) – €2,155,295 – 32S/16Q/16D; Singles – Doubles	(France) Pierre-Hugues Herbert (France) Nicolas Mahut; 7–6^{(7–5)}, 4–6, [10–7]	(Finland) Henri Kontinen (Germany) Jan-Lennard Struff	(Serbia) Filip Krajinović (Spain) Pablo Carreño Busta	(Russia) Andrey Rublev (United Kingdom) Dan Evans (Italy) Jannik Sinner (Slovenia) Aljaž Bedene
10 Feb	New York Open; Uniondale, United States; ATP 250; Hard (i) – $804,180 – 28S/16Q/16D; Singles – Doubles	(United Kingdom) Kyle Edmund; 7–5, 6–1	(Italy) Andreas Seppi	(Chinese Taipei) Jason Jung (Serbia) Miomir Kecmanović	(Australia) Jordan Thompson (United States) Reilly Opelka (France) Ugo Humbert (South Korea) Kwon Soon-woo
10 Feb	New York Open; Uniondale, United States; ATP 250; Hard (i) – $804,180 – 28S/16Q/16D; Singles – Doubles	(United Kingdom) Dominic Inglot (Pakistan) Aisam-ul-Haq Qureshi; 7–6^{(7–5)}, 7–6^{(8–6)}	(United States) Steve Johnson (United States) Reilly Opelka	(Chinese Taipei) Jason Jung (Serbia) Miomir Kecmanović	(Australia) Jordan Thompson (United States) Reilly Opelka (France) Ugo Humbert (South Korea) Kwon Soon-woo
10 Feb	Argentina Open; Buenos Aires, Argentina; ATP 250; Clay (red) – $696,280 – 28S/16Q/16D; Singles – Doubles	(Norway) Casper Ruud; 6–1, 6–4	(Portugal) Pedro Sousa	(Argentina) Diego Schwartzman (Argentina) Juan Ignacio Londero	(Uruguay) Pablo Cuevas (Brazil) Thiago Monteiro (Serbia) Dušan Lajović (Argentina) Guido Pella
10 Feb	Argentina Open; Buenos Aires, Argentina; ATP 250; Clay (red) – $696,280 – 28S/16Q/16D; Singles – Doubles	(Spain) Marcel Granollers (Argentina) Horacio Zeballos; 6–4, 5–7, [18–16]	(Argentina) Guillermo Durán (Argentina) Juan Ignacio Londero	(Argentina) Diego Schwartzman (Argentina) Juan Ignacio Londero	(Uruguay) Pablo Cuevas (Brazil) Thiago Monteiro (Serbia) Dušan Lajović (Argentina) Guido Pella
17 Feb	Rio Open; Rio de Janeiro, Brazil; ATP 500; Clay (red) – $1,915,485 – 32S/16Q/16D; Singles – Doubles	(Chile) Cristian Garín; 7–6^{(7–3)}, 7–5	(Italy) Gianluca Mager	(Hungary) Attila Balázs (Croatia) Borna Ćorić	(Austria) Dominic Thiem (Spain) Pedro Martínez (Argentina) Federico Coria (Italy) Lorenzo Sonego
17 Feb	Rio Open; Rio de Janeiro, Brazil; ATP 500; Clay (red) – $1,915,485 – 32S/16Q/16D; Singles – Doubles	(Spain) Marcel Granollers (Argentina) Horacio Zeballos; 6–4, 5–7, [10–7]	(Italy) Salvatore Caruso (Italy) Federico Gaio	(Hungary) Attila Balázs (Croatia) Borna Ćorić	(Austria) Dominic Thiem (Spain) Pedro Martínez (Argentina) Federico Coria (Italy) Lorenzo Sonego
17 Feb	Open 13; Marseille, France; ATP 250; Hard (i) – €769,670 – 28S/16Q/16D; Singles – Doubles	(Greece) Stefanos Tsitsipas; 6–3, 6–4	(Canada) Félix Auger-Aliassime	(France) Gilles Simon (Kazakhstan) Alexander Bublik	(Russia) Daniil Medvedev (Belarus) Egor Gerasimov (Canada) Denis Shapovalov (Canada) Vasek Pospisil
17 Feb	Open 13; Marseille, France; ATP 250; Hard (i) – €769,670 – 28S/16Q/16D; Singles – Doubles	(France) Nicolas Mahut (Canada) Vasek Pospisil; 6–3, 6–4	(Netherlands) Wesley Koolhof (Croatia) Nikola Mektić	(France) Gilles Simon (Kazakhstan) Alexander Bublik	(Russia) Daniil Medvedev (Belarus) Egor Gerasimov (Canada) Denis Shapovalov (Canada) Vasek Pospisil
17 Feb	Delray Beach Open; Delray Beach, United States; ATP 250; Hard – $673,655 – 32S/16Q/16D; Singles – Doubles	(United States) Reilly Opelka; 7–5, 6–7^{(4–7)}, 6–2	(Japan) Yoshihito Nishioka	(France) Ugo Humbert (Canada) Milos Raonic	(United States) Frances Tiafoe (United States) Brandon Nakashima (South Korea) Kwon Soon-woo (United States) Steve Johnson
17 Feb	Delray Beach Open; Delray Beach, United States; ATP 250; Hard – $673,655 – 32S/16Q/16D; Singles – Doubles	(United States) Bob Bryan (United States) Mike Bryan; 3–6, 7–5, [10–5]	(United Kingdom) Luke Bambridge (Japan) Ben McLachlan	(France) Ugo Humbert (Canada) Milos Raonic	(United States) Frances Tiafoe (United States) Brandon Nakashima (South Korea) Kwon Soon-woo (United States) Steve Johnson
24 Feb	Dubai Tennis Championships; Dubai, United Arab Emirates; ATP 500; Hard – $2,950,420 – 32S/16Q/16D; Singles – Doubles	(Serbia) Novak Djokovic; 6–3, 6–4	(Greece) Stefanos Tsitsipas	(France) Gaël Monfils (United Kingdom) Dan Evans	(Russia) Karen Khachanov (France) Richard Gasquet (Russia) Andrey Rublev (Germany) Jan-Lennard Struff
24 Feb	Dubai Tennis Championships; Dubai, United Arab Emirates; ATP 500; Hard – $2,950,420 – 32S/16Q/16D; Singles – Doubles	(Australia) John Peers (New Zealand) Michael Venus; 6–3, 6–2	(South Africa) Raven Klaasen (Austria) Oliver Marach	(France) Gaël Monfils (United Kingdom) Dan Evans	(Russia) Karen Khachanov (France) Richard Gasquet (Russia) Andrey Rublev (Germany) Jan-Lennard Struff
24 Feb	Mexican Open; Acapulco, Mexico; ATP 500; Hard – $2,000,845 – 32S/16Q/16D; Singles – Doubles	(Spain) Rafael Nadal; 6–3, 6–2	(United States) Taylor Fritz	(Bulgaria) Grigor Dimitrov (United States) John Isner	(South Korea) Kwon Soon-woo (Switzerland) Stan Wawrinka (United Kingdom) Kyle Edmund (United States) Tommy Paul
24 Feb	Mexican Open; Acapulco, Mexico; ATP 500; Hard – $2,000,845 – 32S/16Q/16D; Singles – Doubles	(Poland) Łukasz Kubot (Brazil) Marcelo Melo; 7–6^{(8–6)}, 6–7^{(4–7)}, [11–9]	(Colombia) Juan Sebastián Cabal (Colombia) Robert Farah	(Bulgaria) Grigor Dimitrov (United States) John Isner	(South Korea) Kwon Soon-woo (Switzerland) Stan Wawrinka (United Kingdom) Kyle Edmund (United States) Tommy Paul
24 Feb	Chile Open; Santiago, Chile; ATP 250; Clay (red) – $674,730 – 28S/16Q/16D; Singles – Doubles	(Brazil) Thiago Seyboth Wild; 7–5, 4–6, 6–3	(Norway) Casper Ruud	(Argentina) Renzo Olivo (Spain) Albert Ramos Viñolas	(Chile) Cristian Garín (Bolivia) Hugo Dellien (Brazil) Thiago Monteiro (Argentina) Federico Delbonis
24 Feb	Chile Open; Santiago, Chile; ATP 250; Clay (red) – $674,730 – 28S/16Q/16D; Singles – Doubles	(Spain) Roberto Carballés Baena (Spain) Alejandro Davidovich Fokina; 7–6^{(7–3)}, 6–1	(El Salvador) Marcelo Arévalo (United Kingdom) Jonny O'Mara	(Argentina) Renzo Olivo (Spain) Albert Ramos Viñolas	(Chile) Cristian Garín (Bolivia) Hugo Dellien (Brazil) Thiago Monteiro (Argentina) Federico Delbonis

=== March ===
Week	Tournament	Champions	Runners-up	Semifinalists	Quarterfinalists
2 Mar	Davis Cup qualifying round Zagreb, Croatia – hard (i); Debrecen, Hungary – hard (i); Bogotá, Colombia – clay (i); Honolulu, United States – hard (i); Adelaide, Australia – hard Cagliari, Italy – clay Düsseldorf, Germany – hard (i); Nur-Sultan, Kazakhstan – hard (i); Bratislava, Slovakia – clay (i); Premstätten, Austria – hard (i); Miki, Japan – hard (i); Stockholm, Sweden – hard (i)	Qualifying round winners Croatia 3–1; Hungary 3–2; Colombia 3–1; United States 4–0; Australia 3–1; Italy 4–0; Germany 4–1; Kazakhstan 3–1; Czech Republic 3–1; Austria 3–1; Ecuador 3–0; Sweden 3–1	Qualifying round losers Uzbekistan; Belgium; Argentina; India; Brazil; South Korea; Belarus; Netherlands; Slovakia; Uruguay; Japan; Chile		
Rest of Mar					

=== April–July ===
No tournaments were played due to the COVID-19 pandemic (see affected tournaments below).

=== August ===
Week	Tournament	Champions	Runners-up	Semifinalists	Quarterfinalists
Early Aug					
24 Aug	Cincinnati Open; New York City, United States; ATP Masters 1000 $4,674,780 − Hard – 56S/48Q/32D; Singles – Doubles	(Serbia) Novak Djokovic; 1–6, 6–3, 6–4	(Canada) Milos Raonic	(Spain) Roberto Bautista Agut (Greece) Stefanos Tsitsipas	(Germany) Jan-Lennard Struff (Russia) Daniil Medvedev (United States) Reilly Opelka (Serbia) Filip Krajinović
24 Aug	Cincinnati Open; New York City, United States; ATP Masters 1000 $4,674,780 − Hard – 56S/48Q/32D; Singles – Doubles	(Spain) Pablo Carreño Busta (Australia) Alex de Minaur; 6–2, 7–5	(United Kingdom) Jamie Murray (United Kingdom) Neal Skupski	(Spain) Roberto Bautista Agut (Greece) Stefanos Tsitsipas	(Germany) Jan-Lennard Struff (Russia) Daniil Medvedev (United States) Reilly Opelka (Serbia) Filip Krajinović
31 Aug; 7 Sep	US Open; New York City, United States; Grand Slam $21,656,000 − Hard – 128S/32D; Singles – Doubles − Mixed doubles (Note: Cancelled)	(Austria) Dominic Thiem; 2–6, 4–6, 6–4, 6–3, 7–6^{(8–6)}	(Germany) Alexander Zverev	(Spain) Pablo Carreño Busta (Russia) Daniil Medvedev	(Canada) Denis Shapovalov (Croatia) Borna Ćorić (Russia) Andrey Rublev (Australia) Alex de Minaur
31 Aug; 7 Sep	US Open; New York City, United States; Grand Slam $21,656,000 − Hard – 128S/32D; Singles – Doubles − Mixed doubles	(Croatia) Mate Pavić (Brazil) Bruno Soares; 7–5, 6–3	(Netherlands) Wesley Koolhof (Croatia) Nikola Mektić	(Spain) Pablo Carreño Busta (Russia) Daniil Medvedev	(Canada) Denis Shapovalov (Croatia) Borna Ćorić (Russia) Andrey Rublev (Australia) Alex de Minaur

=== September ===
Week	Tournament	Champions	Runners-up	Semifinalists	Quarterfinalists
7 Sep	Austrian Open; Kitzbühel, Austria; ATP 250; Clay (red) – €400,335 – 28S/24Q/16D; Singles – Doubles	(Serbia) Miomir Kecmanović; 6–4, 6–4	(Germany) Yannick Hanfmann	(Switzerland) Marc-Andrea Hüsler (Serbia) Laslo Đere	(Spain) Feliciano López (Argentina) Federico Delbonis (Germany) Maximilian Marterer (Argentina) Diego Schwartzman
7 Sep	Austrian Open; Kitzbühel, Austria; ATP 250; Clay (red) – €400,335 – 28S/24Q/16D; Singles – Doubles	(United States) Austin Krajicek (Croatia) Franko Škugor; 7–6^{(7–5)}, 7–5	(Spain) Marcel Granollers (Argentina) Horacio Zeballos	(Switzerland) Marc-Andrea Hüsler (Serbia) Laslo Đere	(Spain) Feliciano López (Argentina) Federico Delbonis (Germany) Maximilian Marterer (Argentina) Diego Schwartzman
14 Sep	Italian Open; Rome, Italy; ATP Masters 1000; Clay (red) – €3,465,045 – 56S/64Q/32D; Singles – Doubles	(Serbia) Novak Djokovic; 7–5, 6–3	(Argentina) Diego Schwartzman	(Norway) Casper Ruud (Canada) Denis Shapovalov	(Germany) Dominik Koepfer (Italy) Matteo Berrettini (Bulgaria) Grigor Dimitrov (Spain) Rafael Nadal
14 Sep	Italian Open; Rome, Italy; ATP Masters 1000; Clay (red) – €3,465,045 – 56S/64Q/32D; Singles – Doubles	(Spain) Marcel Granollers (Argentina) Horacio Zeballos; 6–4, 5–7, [10–8]	(France) Jérémy Chardy (France) Fabrice Martin	(Norway) Casper Ruud (Canada) Denis Shapovalov	(Germany) Dominik Koepfer (Italy) Matteo Berrettini (Bulgaria) Grigor Dimitrov (Spain) Rafael Nadal
21 Sep	Hamburg Open; Hamburg, Germany; ATP 500; Clay (red) – €1,203,960 – 32S/16Q/16D; Singles – Doubles	(Russia) Andrey Rublev; 6–4, 3–6, 7–5	(Greece) Stefanos Tsitsipas	(Norway) Casper Ruud (Chile) Cristian Garín	(France) Ugo Humbert (Spain) Roberto Bautista Agut (Kazakhstan) Alexander Bublik (Serbia) Dušan Lajović
21 Sep	Hamburg Open; Hamburg, Germany; ATP 500; Clay (red) – €1,203,960 – 32S/16Q/16D; Singles – Doubles	(Australia) John Peers (New Zealand) Michael Venus; 6–3, 6–4	(Croatia) Ivan Dodig (Croatia) Mate Pavić	(Norway) Casper Ruud (Chile) Cristian Garín	(France) Ugo Humbert (Spain) Roberto Bautista Agut (Kazakhstan) Alexander Bublik (Serbia) Dušan Lajović
28 Sep; 5 Oct	French Open; Paris, France; Grand Slam €18,158,520 − Clay (red); 128S/128Q/64D; Singles – Doubles − Mixed doubles (Note: Cancelled)	(Spain) Rafael Nadal; 6–0, 6–2, 7–5	(Serbia) Novak Djokovic	(Greece) Stefanos Tsitsipas (Argentina) Diego Schwartzman	(Spain) Pablo Carreño Busta (Russia) Andrey Rublev (Austria) Dominic Thiem (Italy) Jannik Sinner
28 Sep; 5 Oct	French Open; Paris, France; Grand Slam €18,158,520 − Clay (red); 128S/128Q/64D; Singles – Doubles − Mixed doubles	(Germany) Kevin Krawietz (Germany) Andreas Mies; 6–3, 7–5	(Croatia) Mate Pavić (Brazil) Bruno Soares	(Greece) Stefanos Tsitsipas (Argentina) Diego Schwartzman	(Spain) Pablo Carreño Busta (Russia) Andrey Rublev (Austria) Dominic Thiem (Italy) Jannik Sinner

=== October ===
Week	Tournament	Champions	Runners-up	Semifinalists	Quarterfinalists
12 Oct	St. Petersburg Open; St. Petersburg, Russia; ATP 500; Hard (i) – $1,399,370 – 32S/16Q/16D; Singles – Doubles	(Russia) Andrey Rublev; 7–6^{(7–5)}, 6–4	(Croatia) Borna Ćorić	(Canada) Milos Raonic (Canada) Denis Shapovalov	(United States) Reilly Opelka (Russia) Karen Khachanov (United Kingdom) Cameron Norrie (Switzerland) Stan Wawrinka
12 Oct	St. Petersburg Open; St. Petersburg, Russia; ATP 500; Hard (i) – $1,399,370 – 32S/16Q/16D; Singles – Doubles	(Austria) Jürgen Melzer (France) Édouard Roger-Vasselin; 6–2, 7–6^{(7–4)}	(Brazil) Marcelo Demoliner (Netherlands) Matwé Middelkoop	(Canada) Milos Raonic (Canada) Denis Shapovalov	(United States) Reilly Opelka (Russia) Karen Khachanov (United Kingdom) Cameron Norrie (Switzerland) Stan Wawrinka
12 Oct	Bett1Hulks Indoors; Cologne, Germany; ATP 250; Hard (i) – €325,610 – 28S/16Q/16D; Singles – Doubles	(Germany) Alexander Zverev; 6–3, 6–3	(Canada) Félix Auger-Aliassime	(Spain) Alejandro Davidovich Fokina (Spain) Roberto Bautista Agut	(South Africa) Lloyd Harris (Austria) Dennis Novak (Moldova) Radu Albot (Poland) Hubert Hurkacz
12 Oct	Bett1Hulks Indoors; Cologne, Germany; ATP 250; Hard (i) – €325,610 – 28S/16Q/16D; Singles – Doubles	(France) Pierre-Hugues Herbert (France) Nicolas Mahut; 6–4, 6–4	(Poland) Łukasz Kubot (Brazil) Marcelo Melo	(Spain) Alejandro Davidovich Fokina (Spain) Roberto Bautista Agut	(South Africa) Lloyd Harris (Austria) Dennis Novak (Moldova) Radu Albot (Poland) Hubert Hurkacz
12 Oct	Sardegna Open; Pula, Italy; ATP 250; Clay – €271,345 – 28S/16Q/16D; Singles – Doubles	(Serbia) Laslo Đere; 7–6^{(7–3)}, 7–5	(Italy) Marco Cecchinato	(Serbia) Danilo Petrović (Italy) Lorenzo Musetti	(Argentina) Federico Delbonis (Spain) Albert Ramos Viñolas (Germany) Yannick Hanfmann (Czech Republic) Jiří Veselý
12 Oct	Sardegna Open; Pula, Italy; ATP 250; Clay – €271,345 – 28S/16Q/16D; Singles – Doubles	(New Zealand) Marcus Daniell (Austria) Philipp Oswald; 6–3, 6–4	(Colombia) Juan Sebastián Cabal (Colombia) Robert Farah	(Serbia) Danilo Petrović (Italy) Lorenzo Musetti	(Argentina) Federico Delbonis (Spain) Albert Ramos Viñolas (Germany) Yannick Hanfmann (Czech Republic) Jiří Veselý
19 Oct	European Open; Antwerp, Belgium; ATP 250; Hard (i) – €472,590 – 28S/16Q/16D; Singles – Doubles	(France) Ugo Humbert; 6–1, 7–6^{(7–4)}	(Australia) Alex de Minaur	(Bulgaria) Grigor Dimitrov (United Kingdom) Dan Evans	(United States) Marcos Giron (Canada) Milos Raonic (Russia) Karen Khachanov (South Africa) Lloyd Harris
19 Oct	European Open; Antwerp, Belgium; ATP 250; Hard (i) – €472,590 – 28S/16Q/16D; Singles – Doubles	(Australia) John Peers (New Zealand) Michael Venus; 6–3, 6–4	(India) Rohan Bopanna (Netherlands) Matwé Middelkoop	(Bulgaria) Grigor Dimitrov (United Kingdom) Dan Evans	(United States) Marcos Giron (Canada) Milos Raonic (Russia) Karen Khachanov (South Africa) Lloyd Harris
19 Oct	Bett1Hulks Championship; Cologne, Germany; ATP 250; Hard (i) – €325,610 – 28S/16Q/16D; Singles – Doubles	(Germany) Alexander Zverev; 6–2, 6–1	(Argentina) Diego Schwartzman	(Italy) Jannik Sinner (Canada) Félix Auger-Aliassime	(France) Adrian Mannarino (France) Gilles Simon (Japan) Yoshihito Nishioka (Spain) Alejandro Davidovich Fokina
19 Oct	Bett1Hulks Championship; Cologne, Germany; ATP 250; Hard (i) – €325,610 – 28S/16Q/16D; Singles – Doubles	(South Africa) Raven Klaasen (Japan) Ben McLachlan; 6–2, 6–4	(Germany) Kevin Krawietz (Germany) Andreas Mies	(Italy) Jannik Sinner (Canada) Félix Auger-Aliassime	(France) Adrian Mannarino (France) Gilles Simon (Japan) Yoshihito Nishioka (Spain) Alejandro Davidovich Fokina
26 Oct	Vienna Open; Vienna, Austria; ATP 500; Hard (i) – €1,550,950 – 32S/16Q/16D; Singles – Doubles	(Russia) Andrey Rublev; 6–4, 6–4	(Italy) Lorenzo Sonego	(United Kingdom) Dan Evans (South Africa) Kevin Anderson	(Serbia) Novak Djokovic (Bulgaria) Grigor Dimitrov (Russia) Daniil Medvedev (Austria) Dominic Thiem
26 Oct	Vienna Open; Vienna, Austria; ATP 500; Hard (i) – €1,550,950 – 32S/16Q/16D; Singles – Doubles	(Poland) Łukasz Kubot (Brazil) Marcelo Melo; 7–6^{(7–5)}, 7–5	(United Kingdom) Jamie Murray (United Kingdom) Neal Skupski	(United Kingdom) Dan Evans (South Africa) Kevin Anderson	(Serbia) Novak Djokovic (Bulgaria) Grigor Dimitrov (Russia) Daniil Medvedev (Austria) Dominic Thiem
26 Oct	Astana Open; Astana, Kazakhstan; ATP 250; Hard (i) – $337,000 – 28S/16Q/16D; Singles – Doubles	(Australia) John Millman; 7–5, 6–1	(France) Adrian Mannarino	(Finland) Emil Ruusuvuori (United States) Frances Tiafoe	(Kazakhstan) Mikhail Kukushkin (United States) Mackenzie McDonald (United States) Tommy Paul (Belarus) Egor Gerasimov
26 Oct	Astana Open; Astana, Kazakhstan; ATP 250; Hard (i) – $337,000 – 28S/16Q/16D; Singles – Doubles	(Belgium) Sander Gillé (Belgium) Joran Vliegen; 7–5, 6–3	(Australia) Max Purcell (Australia) Luke Saville	(Finland) Emil Ruusuvuori (United States) Frances Tiafoe	(Kazakhstan) Mikhail Kukushkin (United States) Mackenzie McDonald (United States) Tommy Paul (Belarus) Egor Gerasimov

=== November ===
Week	Tournament	Champions	Runners-up	Semifinalists	Quarterfinalists
2 Nov	Paris Masters; Paris, France; ATP Masters 1000; Hard (i) – €3,151,145 – 58S/28Q/24D; Singles – Doubles	(Russia) Daniil Medvedev; 5–7, 6–4, 6–1	(Germany) Alexander Zverev	(Spain) Rafael Nadal (Canada) Milos Raonic	(Spain) Pablo Carreño Busta (Switzerland) Stan Wawrinka (Argentina) Diego Schwartzman (France) Ugo Humbert
2 Nov	Paris Masters; Paris, France; ATP Masters 1000; Hard (i) – €3,151,145 – 58S/28Q/24D; Singles – Doubles	(Canada) Félix Auger-Aliassime (Poland) Hubert Hurkacz; 6–7^{(3–7)}, 7–6^{(9–7)}, [10–2]	(Croatia) Mate Pavić (Brazil) Bruno Soares	(Spain) Rafael Nadal (Canada) Milos Raonic	(Spain) Pablo Carreño Busta (Switzerland) Stan Wawrinka (Argentina) Diego Schwartzman (France) Ugo Humbert
9 Nov	Sofia Open; Sofia, Bulgaria; ATP 250; Hard (i) – €389,270 – 28S/16Q/16D; Singles – Doubles	(Italy) Jannik Sinner; 6–4, 3–6, 7–6^{(7–3)}	(Canada) Vasek Pospisil	(France) Adrian Mannarino (France) Richard Gasquet	(Moldova) Radu Albot (Australia) Alex de Minaur (Australia) John Millman (Italy) Salvatore Caruso
9 Nov	Sofia Open; Sofia, Bulgaria; ATP 250; Hard (i) – €389,270 – 28S/16Q/16D; Singles – Doubles	(United Kingdom) Jamie Murray (United Kingdom) Neal Skupski; Walkover	(Austria) Jürgen Melzer (France) Édouard Roger-Vasselin	(France) Adrian Mannarino (France) Richard Gasquet	(Moldova) Radu Albot (Australia) Alex de Minaur (Australia) John Millman (Italy) Salvatore Caruso
9 Nov; 16 Nov	ATP Finals; London, United Kingdom; ATP Finals; Hard (i) – $5,700,000 – 8S/8D (RR); Singles – Doubles	(Russia) Daniil Medvedev; 4–6, 7–6^{(7–2)}, 6–4	(Austria) Dominic Thiem	(Spain) Rafael Nadal (Serbia) Novak Djokovic	Round robin (Germany) Alexander Zverev (Argentina) Diego Schwartzman (Greece) Stefanos Tsitsipas (Russia) Andrey Rublev
9 Nov; 16 Nov	ATP Finals; London, United Kingdom; ATP Finals; Hard (i) – $5,700,000 – 8S/8D (RR); Singles – Doubles	(Netherlands) Wesley Koolhof (Croatia) Nikola Mektić; 6–2, 3–6, [10–5]	(Austria) Jürgen Melzer (France) Édouard Roger-Vasselin	(Spain) Rafael Nadal (Serbia) Novak Djokovic	Round robin (Germany) Alexander Zverev (Argentina) Diego Schwartzman (Greece) Stefanos Tsitsipas (Russia) Andrey Rublev

=== Affected tournaments ===
The COVID-19 pandemic affected many tournaments on both the ATP and WTA tours. Tournaments from 9 March to 21 August were either cancelled or postponed. The 2020 Summer Olympics were postponed to 2021 and the ATP rankings were also frozen over this period, with the last official rankings being released on March 16. The following tournaments were suspended or postponed due to the COVID-19 pandemic.

Week of	Tournament	Status
9 Mar; 16 Mar	Indian Wells Open; Indian Wells, United States; ATP Masters 1000; Hard	Cancelled
23 Mar; 30 Mar	Miami Open; Miami Gardens, United States; ATP Masters 1000; Hard	Cancelled
6 Apr	U.S. Men's Clay Court Championships; Houston, United States; ATP 250; Clay (maroon)	Cancelled
6 Apr	Grand Prix Hassan II; Marrakesh, Morocco; ATP 250; Clay (red)	Cancelled
13 Apr	Monte-Carlo Masters; Roquebrune-Cap-Martin, France; ATP Masters 1000; Clay (red)	Cancelled
20 Apr	Barcelona Open; Barcelona, Spain; ATP 500; Clay (red)	Cancelled
20 Apr	Hungarian Open; Budapest, Hungary; ATP 250; Clay (red)	Cancelled
27 Apr	Estoril Open; Cascais, Portugal; ATP 250; Clay (red)	Cancelled
27 Apr	Bavarian International Tennis Championships; Munich, Germany; ATP 250; Clay (red)	Cancelled
4 May	Madrid Open; Madrid, Spain; ATP Masters 1000; Clay (red)	Initially rescheduled to September, but later cancelled
11 May	Italian Open; Rome, Italy; ATP Masters 1000; Clay (red)	Rescheduled to September
18 May	Geneva Open; Geneva, Switzerland; ATP 250; Clay (red)	Cancelled
18 May	Lyon Open; Lyon, France; ATP 250; Clay (red)	Cancelled
25 May; 1 Jun	French Open; Paris, France; Grand Slam; Clay (red)	Rescheduled to September
8 Jun	Stuttgart Open; Stuttgart, Germany; ATP 250; Grass	Cancelled
8 Jun	Rosmalen Grass Court Championships 's-Hertogenbosch, Netherlands; ATP 250; Grass	Cancelled
15 Jun	Halle Open; Halle, Germany; ATP 500; Grass	Cancelled
15 Jun	Queen's Club Championships; London, United Kingdom; ATP 500; Grass	Cancelled
22 Jun	Eastbourne International; Eastbourne, United Kingdom; ATP 250; Grass	Cancelled
22 Jun	Mallorca Championships; Santa Ponsa, Spain; ATP 250; Grass	Cancelled
29 Jun; 6 Jul	Wimbledon; London, United Kingdom; Grand Slam; Grass	Cancelled
13 Jul	Hamburg European Open; Hamburg, Germany; ATP 500; Clay (red)	Rescheduled to September
13 Jul	Hall of Fame Open; Newport, United States; ATP 250; Grass	Cancelled
13 Jul	Swedish Open; Båstad, Sweden; ATP 250; Clay (red)	Cancelled
20 Jul	Los Cabos Open; Cabo San Lucas, Mexico; ATP 250; Hard	Cancelled
20 Jul	Swiss Open; Gstaad, Switzerland; ATP 250; Clay (red)	Cancelled
20 Jul	Croatia Open; Umag, Croatia; ATP 250; Clay (red)	Cancelled
27 Jul	Summer Olympic Games; Tokyo, Japan; Olympic Games; Hard	Rescheduled to July 2021
27 Jul	Atlanta Open; Atlanta, United States; ATP 250; Hard	Cancelled
27 Jul	Austrian Open; Kitzbühel, Austria; ATP 250; Clay (red)	Rescheduled to September
3 Aug	Washington Open; Washington, United States; ATP 500; Hard	Cancelled
10 Aug	Canadian Open; Toronto, Canada; ATP Masters 1000; Hard	Cancelled
17 Aug	Cincinnati Open; Mason, United States; ATP Masters 1000; Hard	Rescheduled to 22 August and moved from Mason, Ohio to New York City
24 Aug	Winston-Salem Open; Winston-Salem, United States; ATP 250; Hard	Cancelled
21 Sep	Laver Cup; Boston, United States; Hard (i)	Postponed to September 2021
21 Sep	St. Petersburg Open; St. Petersburg, Russia; ATP 250; Hard (i)	Rescheduled to October as a one-time ATP 500 event
21 Sep	Moselle Open; Metz, France; ATP 250; Hard (i)	Cancelled
28 Sep	Chengdu Open; Chengdu, China; ATP 250; Hard	Cancelled
28 Sep	Zhuhai Championships; Zhuhai, China; ATP 250; Hard	Cancelled
28 Sep	Sofia Open; Sofia, Bulgaria; ATP 250; Hard (i)	Rescheduled to November
5 Oct	Japan Open; Tokyo, Japan; ATP 500; Hard	Cancelled
5 Oct	China Open; Beijing, China; ATP 500; Hard	Cancelled
12 Oct	Shanghai Masters; Shanghai, China; ATP Masters 1000; Hard	Cancelled
19 Oct	Stockholm Open; Stockholm, Sweden; ATP 250; Hard (i)	Cancelled
19 Oct	Kremlin Cup; Moscow, Russia; ATP 250; Hard (i)	Cancelled
26 Oct	Swiss Indoors; Basel, Switzerland; ATP 500; Hard (i)	Cancelled
9 Nov	Next Gen ATP Finals; Milan, Italy; Next Generation ATP Finals; Hard (i)	Cancelled
23 Nov	Davis Cup Finals; Madrid, Spain; Hard (i)	Postponed to November 2021

== Statistical information ==
These tables present the number of singles (S), doubles (D), and mixed doubles (X) titles won by each player and each nation during the season, within all the tournament categories of the 2019 ATP Tour: the Grand Slam tournaments, the ATP Finals, the ATP Masters 1000, the ATP 500 series, and the ATP 250 series. The players/nations are sorted by:

1. Total number of titles (a doubles title won by two players representing the same nation counts as only one win for the nation);
2. Cumulated importance of those titles (one Grand Slam win equalling two Masters 1000 wins, one undefeated ATP Finals win equalling one-and-a-half Masters 1000 win, one Masters 1000 win equalling two 500 events wins, one 500 event win equalling two 250 events wins);
3. A singles > doubles > mixed doubles hierarchy;
4. Alphabetical order (by family names for players).

Key
Grand Slam
ATP Finals
ATP Masters 1000
ATP 500
ATP 250

=== Titles won by player ===
Total	Player	Grand Slam			ATP Finals		Masters 1000		Tour 500		Tour 250		Total		
Total	Player	S	D	X	S	D	S	D	S	D	S	D	S	D	X
5	Andrey Rublev (RUS)								● ● ●		● ●		5	0	0
4	Novak Djokovic (SRB)	●					● ●		●				4	0	0
3	Marcel Granollers (ESP)							●		●		●	0	3	0
3	Horacio Zeballos (ARG)							●		●		●	0	3	0
3	John Peers (AUS)									● ●		●	0	3	0
3	Michael Venus (NZL)									● ●		●	0	3	0
3	Nicolas Mahut (FRA)									●		● ●	0	3	0
2	Rafael Nadal (ESP)	●							●				2	0	0
2	Mate Pavić (CRO)		●									●	0	2	0
2	Nikola Mektić (CRO)			●		●							0	1	1
2	Daniil Medvedev (RUS)				●		●						2	0	0
2	Wesley Koolhof (NED)					●						●	0	2	0
2	Łukasz Kubot (POL)									● ●			0	2	0
2	Marcelo Melo (BRA)									● ●			0	2	0
2	Cristian Garín (CHI)								●		●		2	0	0
2	Gaël Monfils (FRA)								●		●		2	0	0
2	Pierre-Hugues Herbert (FRA)									●		●	0	2	0
2	Ugo Humbert (FRA)										● ●		2	0	0
2	Alexander Zverev (GER)										● ●		2	0	0
2	Ben McLachlan (JPN)											● ●	0	2	0
1	Dominic Thiem (AUT)	●											1	0	0
1	Kevin Krawietz (GER)		●										0	1	0
1	Andreas Mies (GER)		●										0	1	0
1	Rajeev Ram (USA)		●										0	1	0
1	Joe Salisbury (GBR)		●										0	1	0
1	Bruno Soares (BRA)		●										0	1	0
1	Félix Auger-Aliassime (CAN)							●					0	1	0
1	Pablo Carreño Busta (ESP)							●					0	1	0
1	Alex de Minaur (AUS)							●					0	1	0
1	Hubert Hurkacz (POL)							●					0	1	0
1	Jürgen Melzer (AUT)									●			0	1	0
1	Édouard Roger-Vasselin (FRA)									●			0	1	0
1	Laslo Đere (SRB)										●		1	0	0
1	Kyle Edmund (GBR)										●		1	0	0
1	Miomir Kecmanović (SRB)										●		1	0	0
1	John Millman (AUS)										●		1	0	0
1	Reilly Opelka (USA)										●		1	0	0
1	Casper Ruud (NOR)										●		1	0	0
1	Stefanos Tsitsipas (GRE)										●		1	0	0
1	Jiří Veselý (CZE)										●		1	0	0
1	Thiago Seyboth Wild (BRA)										●		1	0	0
1	Jannik Sinner (ITA)										●		1	0	0
1	Luke Bambridge (GBR)											●	0	1	0
1	Rohan Bopanna (IND)											●	0	1	0
1	Bob Bryan (USA)											●	0	1	0
1	Mike Bryan (USA)											●	0	1	0
1	Nikola Ćaćić (SRB)											●	0	1	0
1	Roberto Carballés Baena (ESP)											●	0	1	0
1	Marcus Daniell (NZL)											●	0	1	0
1	Alejandro Davidovich Fokina (ESP)											●	0	1	0
1	Marcelo Demoliner (BRA)											●	0	1	0
1	Sander Gillé (BEL)											●	0	1	0
1	Máximo González (ARG)											●	0	1	0
1	André Göransson (SWE)											●	0	1	0
1	Dominic Inglot (GBR)											●	0	1	0
1	Raven Klaasen (RSA)											●	0	1	0
1	Austin Krajicek (USA)											●	0	1	0
1	Fabrice Martin (FRA)											●	0	1	0
1	Matwé Middelkoop (NED)											●	0	1	0
1	Jamie Murray (GBR)											●	0	1	0
1	Philipp Oswald (AUT)											●	0	1	0
1	Vasek Pospisil (CAN)											●	0	1	0
1	Aisam-ul-Haq Qureshi (PAK)											●	0	1	0
1	Christopher Rungkat (INA)											●	0	1	0
1	Neal Skupski (GBR)											●	0	1	0
1	Franko Škugor (CRO)											●	0	1	0
1	Joran Vliegen (BEL)											●	0	1	0

=== Titles won by nation ===
Total	Nation	Grand Slam			ATP Finals		Masters 1000		Tour 500		Tour 250		Total		
Total	Nation	S	D	X	S	D	S	D	S	D	S	D	S	D	X
9	France (FRA)								1	2	3	3	4	5	0
7	Serbia (SRB)	1					2		1		2	1	6	1	0
7	Spain (ESP)	1						2	1	1		2	2	5	0
7	Russia (RUS)				1		1		3		2		7	0	0
5	Croatia (CRO)		1	1		1						2	0	4	1
5	Brazil (BRA)		1							2	1	1	1	4	0
5	Great Britain (GBR)		1								1	3	1	4	0
5	Australia (AUS)							1		2	1	1	1	4	0
4	United States (USA)		1								1	2	1	3	0
4	Argentina (ARG)							1		1		2	0	4	0
4	New Zealand (NZL)									2		2	0	4	0
3	Austria (AUT)	1								1		1	1	2	0
3	Germany (GER)		1								2		2	1	0
3	Netherlands (NED)					1						2	0	3	0
3	Poland (POL)							1		2			0	3	0
2	Canada (CAN)							1				1	0	2	0
2	Chile (CHI)								1		1		2	0	0
2	Japan (JPN)											2	0	2	0
1	Czech Republic (CZE)										1		1	0	0
1	Greece (GRE)										1		1	0	0
1	Norway (NOR)										1		1	0	0
1	Italy (ITA)										1		1	0	0
1	Belgium (BEL)											1	0	1	0
1	India (IND)											1	0	1	0
1	Indonesia (INA)											1	0	1	0
1	Pakistan (PAK)											1	0	1	0
1	South Africa (RSA)											1	0	1	0
1	Sweden (SWE)											1	0	1	0

=== Titles information ===
The following players won their first main circuit title in singles, doubles or mixed doubles:

Singles

- (France) Ugo Humbert (21 years, 206 days) – Auckland (draw)
- (Norway) Casper Ruud (21 years, 56 days) – Buenos Aires (draw)
- (Brazil) Thiago Seyboth Wild (19 years, 350 days) – Santiago (draw)
- (Serbia) Miomir Kecmanović (21 years, 13 days) – Kitzbühel (draw)
- (Australia) John Millman (31 years, 140 days) – Astana (draw)
- (Italy) Jannik Sinner (19 years, 90 days) – Sofia (draw)

Doubles

- (Sweden) André Göransson – Pune (draw)
- (Indonesia) Christopher Rungkat – Pune (draw)
- (Spain) Roberto Carballés Baena – Santiago (draw)
- (Spain) Alejandro Davidovich Fokina – Santiago (draw)
- (Australia) Alex de Minaur – Cincinnati (draw)
- (Canada) Félix Auger-Aliassime – Paris (draw)
- (Poland) Hubert Hurkacz – Paris (draw)

Mixed doubles

- (Croatia) Nikola Mektić – **Australian Open (draw)**

The following players defended a main circuit title in singles, doubles, or mixed doubles:

Singles

- (Serbia) Novak Djokovic – **Australian Open (draw)**
- (France) Gaël Monfils – Rotterdam Open (draw)
- (Greece) Stefanos Tsitsipas – Marseille (draw)
- (Spain) Rafael Nadal – **French Open (draw)**

Doubles

- (Japan) Ben McLachlan – Auckland (draw)
- (Argentina) Horacio Zeballos – Buenos Aires (draw)
- (United States) Bob Bryan – Delray Beach (draw)
- (United States) Mike Bryan – Delray Beach (draw)
- (Germany) Kevin Krawietz – **French Open (draw)**
- (Germany) Andreas Mies – **French Open (draw)**

=== Best ranking ===
The following players achieved a career-high ranking this season in the top 50 (bold indicates players who entered the top 10 for the first time):

Singles

- (Poland) Hubert Hurkacz (reached No. 28 on 3 February)
- (Chile) Cristian Garín (reached No. 18 on 24 February)
- (Kazakhstan) Alexander Bublik (reached No. 47 on 24 February)
- (Japan) Yoshihito Nishioka (reached No. 48 on 24 February)
- (Austria) Dominic Thiem (reached No. 3 on 2 March)
- (United States) Taylor Fritz (reached No. 24 on 2 March)
- (United Kingdom) Daniel Evans (reached No. 28 on 2 March)
- (Germany) Jan-Lennard Struff (reached No. 29 on 31 August)
- (Serbia) Miomir Kecmanović (reached No. 39 on 14 September)
- (Canada) **Denis Shapovalov** (reached No. 10 on 21 September)
- (Norway) Casper Ruud (reached No. 25 on 28 September)
- (Argentina) **Diego Schwartzman** (reached No. 8 on 12 October)
- (Russia) **Andrey Rublev** (reached No. 8 on 19 October)
- (Italy) Lorenzo Sonego (reached No. 32 on 2 November)
- (France) Ugo Humbert (reached No. 30 on 9 November)
- (Italy) Jannik Sinner (reached No. 37 on 16 November)

Doubles

- (Argentina) Diego Schwartzman (reached No. 39 on 6 January)
- (United States) Rajeev Ram (reached No. 5 on 3 February)
- (Slovakia) Filip Polášek (reached No. 7 on 3 February)
- (France) Fabrice Martin (reached No. 22 on 3 February)
- (France) Jérémy Chardy (reached No. 24 on 3 February)
- (United Kingdom) **Joe Salisbury** (reached No. 3 on 10 February)
- (Australia) Luke Saville (reached No. 37 on 24 February)
- (Canada) Denis Shapovalov (reached No. 44 on 24 February)
- (Australia) Max Purcell (reached No. 39 on 2 March)
- (United Kingdom) Neal Skupski (reached No. 26 on 31 August)
- (Belgium) Joran Vliegen (reached No. 35 on 14 September)
- (Belgium) Sander Gillé (reached No. 40 on 14 September)
- (Netherlands) **Wesley Koolhof** (reached No. 5 on 23 November)

== ATP ranking ==
These are the ATP rankings and yearly ATP race rankings of the top 20 singles players, doubles players and doubles teams at the current date of the 2020 season. Rankings were frozen until the resumption of the 2020 season on 3 August 2020.

=== Singles ===
Singles Race Rankings Final rankings
#	Player	Points	Tours
1	Novak Djokovic (SRB)	11,630	17
2	Rafael Nadal (ESP)	9,450	17
3	Dominic Thiem (AUT)	8,325	20
4	Daniil Medvedev (RUS)	6,970	23
5	Roger Federer (SUI)	6,230	16
6	Alexander Zverev (GER)	5,125	26
7	Stefanos Tsitsipas (GRE)	4,625	27
8	Andrey Rublev (RUS)	3,919	25
9	Diego Schwartzman (ARG)	3,455	25
10	Matteo Berrettini (ITA)	2,875	20
11	Gaël Monfils (FRA)	2,860	22
12	Denis Shapovalov (CAN)	2,830	29
13	Roberto Bautista Agut (ESP)	2,710	24
14	Milos Raonic (CAN)	2,580	20
15	David Goffin (BEL)	2,555	26
16	Pablo Carreño Busta (ESP)	2,535	26
17	Fabio Fognini (ITA)	2,400	24
18	Stan Wawrinka (SUI)	2,320	21
19	Grigor Dimitrov (BUL)	2,260	25
20	Karen Khachanov (RUS)	2,245	28

Qualified for the 2020 ATP Finals
Qualified but withdrew from the 2020 ATP Finals

Year-end rankings 2020 (28 December 2020)
#	Player	Points	#Trn	'19 Rk	High	Low	'19→'20
1	Novak Djokovic (SRB)	12,030	18	2	1	2	▲1
2	Rafael Nadal (ESP)	9,850	18	1	1	2	▼1
3	Dominic Thiem (AUT)	9,125	21	4	3	5	▲1
4	Daniil Medvedev (RUS)	8,470	24	5	4	6	▲1
5	Roger Federer (SUI)	6,630	16	3	3	5	▼2
6	Stefanos Tsitsipas (GRE)	5,925	28	6	5	6	Steady
7	Alexander Zverev (GER)	5,525	27	7	7	7	Steady
8	Andrey Rublev (RUS)	4,119	26	23	8	23	▲15
9	Diego Schwartzman (ARG)	3,455	26	13	8	15	▲4
10	Matteo Berrettini (ITA)	3,075	21	8	8	10	▼2
11	Gaël Monfils (FRA)	2,860	23	9	9	11	▼2
12	Denis Shapovalov (CAN)	2,830	30	14	10	17	▲2
13	Roberto Bautista Agut (ESP)	2,710	25	10	9	13	▼3
14	Milos Raonic (CAN)	2,580	21	32	14	37	▲18
15	David Goffin (BEL)	2,555	27	11	10	15	▼4
16	Pablo Carreño Busta (ESP)	2,535	27	27	15	30	▲11
17	Fabio Fognini (ITA)	2,400	25	12	11	17	▼5
18	Stan Wawrinka (SUI)	2,320	22	15	13	20	▼3
19	Grigor Dimitrov (BUL)	2,260	26	20	18	23	▲1
20	Karen Khachanov (RUS)	2,245	29	17	15	20	▲3

Unofficial Final Singles Race Rankings for 2020 events only
#	Player	Points	Tours
1	Novak Djokovic (SRB)	6,455	8
2	Dominic Thiem (AUT)	3,815	7
3	Rafael Nadal (ESP)	3,650	6
4	Alexander Zverev (GER)	3,255	9
5	Andrey Rublev (RUS)	3,135	13
6	Daniil Medvedev (RUS)	2,525	11
7	Stefanos Tsitsipas (GRE)	2,295	12
8	Diego Schwartzman (ARG)	2,220	11
9	Milos Raonić (CAN)	1,725	10
10	Pablo Carreño Busta (ESP)	1,675	12
11	Casper Ruud (NOR)	1,280	14
12	Denis Shapovalov (CAN)	1,240	14
13	Cristian Garín (CHI)	1,220	12
14	Félix Auger-Aliassime (CAN)	1,175	17
15	Ugo Humbert (FRA)	1,170	16
16	Gaël Monfils (FRA)	1,165	9
17	Roberto Bautista Agut (ESP)	1,150	9
18	Borna Ćorić (CRO)	1,115	11
19	Stan Wawrinka (SUI)	1,060	10
20	Jannik Sinner (ITA)	1,030	14

==== No. 1 ranking ====
Holder	Date gained	Date forfeited
Rafael Nadal (ESP)	Year end 2019	2 February
Novak Djokovic (SRB)	3 February	Year end 2020

=== Doubles ===
Doubles team race rankings final rankings
#	Team	Points	Tours
1	Mate Pavić (CRO); Bruno Soares (BRA)	3,785	12
2	Rajeev Ram (USA); Joe Salisbury (GBR)	3,750	10
3	Wesley Koolhof (NED); Nikola Mektić (CRO)	3,625	13
4	Kevin Krawietz (GER); Andreas Mies (GER)	3,110	14
5	Jürgen Melzer (AUT); Édouard Roger-Vasselin (FRA)	2,980	16
6	Marcel Granollers (ESP); Horacio Zeballos (ARG)	2,840	10
7	Łukasz Kubot (POL); Marcelo Melo (BRA)	2,340	14
8	John Peers (AUS); Michael Venus (NZL)	2,240	14
9	Jamie Murray (GBR); Neal Skupski (GBR)	2,140	16
10	Max Purcell (AUS); Luke Saville (AUS)	1,665	12

Team qualified for the 2020 ATP Finals

Year-end rankings 2020 (28 December 2020)
#	Player	Points	#Trn	'19 Rank	High	Low	'19→'20
1	Robert Farah (COL)	8,530	23	1T	1	1	Steady
2	Juan Sebastián Cabal (COL)	8,440	23	1T	1	2	▼1
3	Horacio Zeballos (ARG)	7,180	25	4	3	4	▲1
4	Mate Pavić (CRO)	6,950	30	17	4	17	▲13
5	Wesley Koolhof (NED)	6,590	31	18	5	18	▲13
6	Nicolas Mahut (FRA)	6,430	24	3	3	6	▼3
7	Bruno Soares (BRA)	6,430	25	21	6	27	▲14
8	Nikola Mektić (CRO)	6,330	30	14	8	22	▲6
9	Marcel Granollers (ESP)	5,775	25	26	7	27	▲17
10	Łukasz Kubot (POL)	5,700	28	5	5	12T	▼5
10	Marcelo Melo (BRA)	5,700	28	7	5T	12T	▼3
12	Joe Salisbury (GBR)	5,690	27	22	3	22	▲10
13	Michael Venus (NZL)	5,630	26	10	8	14	▼3
14	Rajeev Ram (USA)	5,600	25	24	5	24	▲10
15	Édouard Roger-Vasselin (FRA)	5,570	33	15	15	22	Steady
16	Ivan Dodig (CRO)	5,100	27	12	8	16	▼4
17	Filip Polášek (SVK)	5,030	27	13	7	17	▼4
18	Raven Klaasen (RSA)	4,840	28	8	8	18	▼10
19	Kevin Krawietz (GER)	4,715	33	9	8	19	▼10
20	Andreas Mies (GER)	4,680	33	11	10	20	▼9

==== No. 1 ranking ====
Holder	Date gained	Date forfeited
Juan Sebastián Cabal (COL); Robert Farah (COL)	Year end 2019	2 February
Robert Farah (COL)	3 February	Year end 2020

== Point distribution ==
Category	W	F	SF	QF	R16	R32	R64	R128	Q	Q3	Q2	Q1
Grand Slam (128S)	2000	1200	720	360	180	90	45	10	25	16	8	0
Grand Slam (64D)	2000	1200	720	360	180	90	0	–	25	–	0	0
ATP Finals (8S/8D)	1500 (max) 1100 (min)	1000 (max) 600 (min)	600 (max); 200 (min)	200 for each round robin match win, +400 for a semifinal win, +500 for the final win.								
ATP Masters 1000 (96S)	1000	600	360	180	90	45	25	10	16	–	8	0
ATP Masters 1000 (56S/48S)	1000	600	360	180	90	45	10	–	25	–	16	0
ATP Masters 1000 (32D)	1000	600	360	180	90	0	–	–	–	–	–	–
ATP 500 (48S)	500	300	180	90	45	20	0	–	10	–	4	0
ATP 500 (32S)	500	300	180	90	45	0	–	–	20	–	10	0
ATP 500 (16D)	500	300	180	90	0	–	–	–	45	–	25	0
ATP 250 (48S)	250	150	90	45	20	10	0	–	5	–	3	0
ATP 250 (32S/28S)	250	150	90	45	20	0	–	–	12	–	6	0
ATP 250 (16D)	250	150	90	45	0	–	–	–	–	–	–	–

== Prize money leaders ==
Prize money in US$ as of 7 December 2020
#	Player	Singles	Doubles	Year-to-date
1	Novak Djokovic (SRB)	$6,435,158	$76,075	$6,511,233
2	Dominic Thiem (AUT)	$6,024,876	$5,880	$6,030,756
3	Rafael Nadal (ESP)	$3,856,127	$25,075	$3,881,202
4	Daniil Medvedev (RUS)	$3,607,670	$15,221	$3,622,891
5	Alexander Zverev (GER)	$3,255,077	$24,889	$3,279,966
6	Andrey Rublev (RUS)	$2,169,487	$54,378	$2,223,865
7	Stefanos Tsitsipas (GRE)	$2,093,232	$13,218	$2,106,450
8	Pablo Carreño Busta (ESP)	$1,736,746	$204,724	$1,941,470
9	Diego Schwartzman (ARG)	$1,550,441	$34,928	$1,585,369
10	Roberto Bautista Agut (ESP)	$1,390,184	$0	$1,390,184

== Best matches by ATPTour.com ==
=== Best 5 Grand Slam tournament matches ===
	Event	Round	Surface	Winner	Opponent	Result
1.	Australian Open	F	Hard	(Serbia) Novak Djokovic	(Austria) Dominic Thiem	6–4, 4–6, 2–6, 6–3, 6–4
2.	Australian Open	R3	Hard	(Australia) Nick Kyrgios	(Russia) Karen Khachanov	6–2, 7–6^{(7–5)}, 6–7^{(6–8)}, 6–7^{(7–9)}, 7–6^{(10–8)}
3.	Australian Open	R3	Hard	(Switzerland) Roger Federer	(Australia) John Millman	4–6, 7–6^{(7–2)}, 6–4, 4–6, 7–6^{(10–8)}
4.	US Open	R3	Hard	(Croatia) Borna Ćorić	(Greece) Stefanos Tsitsipas	6–7^{(2–7)}, 6–4, 4–6, 7–5, 7–6^{(7–4)}
5.	French Open	R1	Clay	(Italy) Lorenzo Giustino	(France) Corentin Moutet	0–6, 7–6^{(9–7)}, 7–6^{(7–3)}, 2–6, 18–16

=== Best 5 ATP Tour matches ===
	Event	Round	Surface	Winner	Opponent	Result
1.	ATP Finals	SF	Hard (i)	(Austria) Dominic Thiem	(Serbia) Novak Djokovic	7–5, 6–7^{(10–12)}, 7–6^{(7–5)}
2.	ATP Finals	SF	Hard (i)	(Russia) Daniil Medvedev	(Spain) Rafael Nadal	3–6, 7–6^{(7–4)}, 6–3
3.	Italian Open	SF	Clay	(Argentina) Diego Schwartzman	(Canada) Denis Shapovalov	6–4, 5–7, 7–6^{(7–4)}
4.	ATP Cup	SF	Hard	(Serbia) Novak Djokovic	(Russia) Daniil Medvedev	6–1, 5–7, 6–4
5.	ATP Cup	RR	Hard	(Australia) Nick Kyrgios	(Greece) Stefanos Tsitsipas	7–6^{(9–7)}, 6–7^{(3–7)}, 7–6^{(7–5)}

== Retirements and comebacks ==
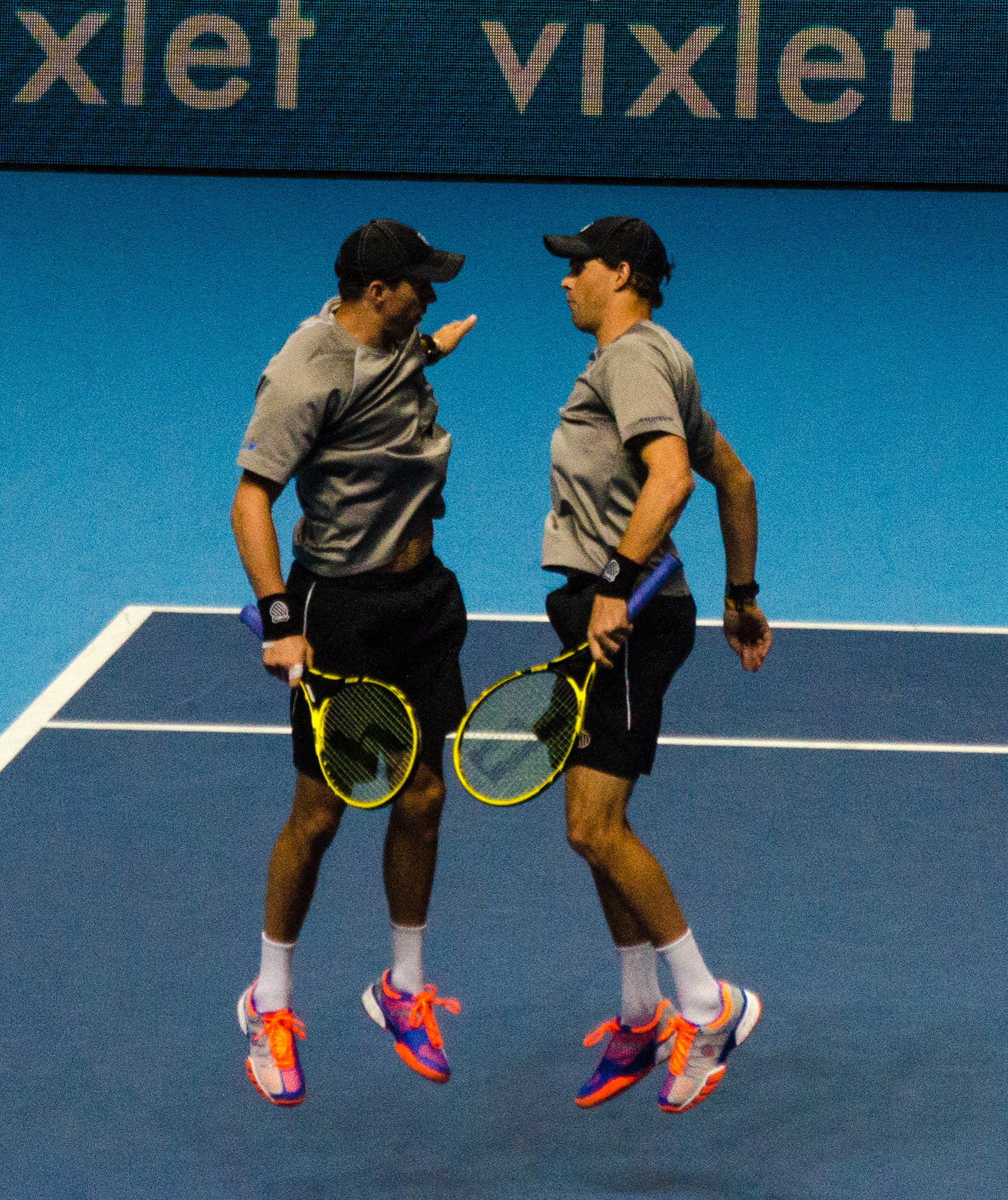
The Bryan brothers, considered to have become the best doubles team in tennis history, announced they planned to retire after the 2020 US Open; amid safety concerns over the COVID-19 pandemic, they would retire before the US Open.

The following is a list of notable players (winners of a main tour title, and/or part of the ATP rankings top 100 in singles, or top 100 in doubles, for at least one week) who returned from retirement, announced their retirement from professional tennis, became inactive (after not playing for more than 52 weeks), or were permanently banned from playing, during the 2020 season:

- Bob and Mike Bryan (born 29 April 1978 in Wesley Chapel, Florida, United States) joined the professional tour in 1998 and reached a career-high ranking of No. 1 in doubles in September 2003. During the 2000s and the 2010s, the Bryan brothers, generally playing together, became the most successful doubles team in tennis history. Between 2003 and 2019, they spent a total of 438 weeks together at the No. 1 spot, with Bob spending an additional week alone at the top for a personal total of 439 weeks and Mike 68 more weeks alone (while Bob was sidelined due to injury) for a record total of 506 weeks. The Bryans also hold the record for most seasons ended together at No. 1, with 10 top finishes between 2003 and 2014. They hold the record for most doubles Grand Slam titles as a team, with 16 titles out of 30 finals: 6 Australian Opens (2006, 2007, 2009, 2010, 2011, 2013), 2 French Opens (2003, 2013) 3 Wimbledons (2006, 2011, 2013) and 5 US Opens (2005, 2008, 2010, 2012, 2014). After Bob was injured in 2018, Mike won 2 more Grand Slam titles with Jack Sock (the 2018 Wimbledon Championships and 2018 US Open) to hold alone the record for most doubles major titles with 18. The Bryans also won 4 year-end championships together (2003, 2004, 2009, 2014), with Mike winning one more alongside Sock (2018). They picked up 2 medals for the United States at the Summer Olympic Games, the bronze in Beijing (2008) and the gold in London (2012). With different partners, they won a total of 11 major mixed doubles titles (7 for Bob, 4 for Mike). On the ATP Tour, the Bryans collected a record of 118 titles together between 1999 and 2019 (with Mike winning an additional 5), including 39 ATP Masters 1000 titles. They were part of the United States Davis Cup team from 2003 to 2018, winning the tournament once (2007). In November 2019, both of them announced their plans to retire after the 2020 US Open. However, they retired a week before the US Open amid safety concerns over the COVID-19 pandemic.
- Frank Dancevic (born 26 September 1984 in Niagara Falls, Canada) joined the professional tour in 2003 and career-high rankings of No. 65 in doubles in September 2007. Dancevic retired from professional tennis in the season.
- Steve Darcis (born 13 March 1984 in Liège, Belgium) joined the professional tour in 2003 and reached a career-high ranking of No. 38 in singles in 2017. He won 2 singles titles on the ATP Tour and recorded his best results playing for the Belgium Davis Cup team, helping it reach both the 2015 and 2017 final in the competition. Darcis announced in October 2019 that the 2020 Australian Open would be his last professional tournament.
- Santiago Giraldo (born 27 November 1987 in Pereira, Colombia) joined the professional tour in 2006 and reached career-high rankings of No. 28 in singles in September 2014 and No. 77 in doubles in June 2015. Giraldo retired from professional tennis in the season.
- Fabrício Neis (born 15 June 1990 in Porto Alegre, Brazil) joined the professional tour in 2005 and career-high rankings of No. 96 in doubles in October 2016. Neis retired from professional tennis in the season.
- Leander Paes (born 17 June 1973 in Kolkata, West Bengal, India) joined the professional tour in 1991 and reached a career-high ranking of No. 1 in doubles in June 1999 and No. 73 in singles in August 1998. Paes had one singles title win on the ATP Tour: the 1998 Hall of Fame Tennis Championships. He won eight doubles and ten mixed doubles Grand Slam titles. Paes achieved the rare men's doubles/mixed doubles titles feat at the 1999 Wimbledon Championships and his mixed doubles Wimbledon title in 2010 made him the second man (after Rod Laver) to win Wimbledon titles in three separate decades. He won a bronze medal for India in singles at the 1996 Olympic Games and competed at consecutive Olympics from 1992 to 2016, making him the first Indian and only tennis player to compete at seven Olympic Games. He is formerly an Indian Davis Cup captain and holds the record for the most Davis Cup doubles wins, with 44 victories between 1990 and 2019. Paes announced on 25 December 2019 that he would retire from professional tennis in 2020, which was his farewell season on the tour.
- Sanchai Ratiwatana (born 23 January 1982 in Bangkok, Thailand) joined the professional tour in 2004 and career-high rankings of No. 39 in doubles in April 2008. He won two doubles titles. Ratiwatana retired from professional tennis in the season.
- Sonchat Ratiwatana (born 23 January 1982 in Bangkok, Thailand) joined the professional tour in 2004 and career-high rankings of No. 39 in doubles in April 2008. He won two doubles titles. Ratiwatana retired from professional tennis in the season.
- Pere Riba (born 7 April 1988 in Barcelona, Spain) joined the professional tour in 2004 and reached career-high rankings of No. 65 in singles in May 2011 and No. 81 in doubles in June 2010. Riba retired from professional tennis in the season.
- (Czech Republic) David Škoch (born 6 November 1976 in Prague, Czechia) joined the professional tour in 1994 and reached career-high rankings of No. 30 in doubles in January 2008. He won five doubles titles. Škoch retired from professional tennis in the season.
- Jürgen Zopp (born 29 March 1988 in Tallinn, Estonia) joined the professional tour in 2008 and reached career-high rankings of No. 71 in singles in September 2012. On 18 December 2020 he announced his retirement from tennis.

=== Inactivity ===
- (Poland) Mateusz Kowalczyk became inactive after not playing for more than a year.
- (Venezuela) Roberto Maytín became inactive after being banned for 14 years after admitting to breaching multiple Tennis Anti-Corruption Program (TACP) rules.
- (Sweden) Andreas Siljeström became inactive after not playing for more than a year.

== See also ==
- 2020 WTA Tour
- 2020 ATP Challenger Tour
- Association of Tennis Professionals
- International Tennis Federation
