= 2020 Astana Open – Singles =

Singles
- 2020 Astana Open

Final
- Champion: (Australia) John Millman
- Runner-up: (France) Adrian Mannarino
- Score: 7–5, 6–1

Events
Singles	Doubles
Astana Open	· 2021 →

This was the first edition of the tournament, primarily organised due to the cancellation of many tournaments during the 2020 season, because of the ongoing COVID-19 pandemic.

Fourth seed John Millman won his first (and only) ATP Tour title, defeating third seed Adrian Mannarino in the final, 7–5, 6–1. He saved two match points against Tommy Paul in quarterfinals.

== Seeds ==
1. (France) Benoît Paire (second round)
2. (Serbia) Miomir Kecmanović (second round)
3. (France) Adrian Mannarino (final)
4. (Australia) John Millman (champion)
5. (United States) Tennys Sandgren (first round)
6. (Kazakhstan) Alexander Bublik (first round)
7. (United States) Tommy Paul (quarterfinals)
8. (Australia) Jordan Thompson (second round)

== Draw ==
=== Key ===
- Q = Qualifier
- WC = Wild card
- LL = Lucky loser
- Alt = Alternate
- ITF = ITF entry
- PR = Protected ranking
- SR = Special ranking
- SE = Special exempt
- JE = Junior exempt
- JR = Junior Accelerator Programme entrant
- CO = College Accelerator Programme entrant
- NG = Next Gen Accelerator Program entrant
- w/o = Walkover
- r = Retired
- d = Defaulted

=== Finals ===
Semifinals
Q	(Finland) Emil Ruusuvuori	5	2
3	(France) Adrian Mannarino	7	6
4	(Australia) John Millman	3	6	6
(United States) Frances Tiafoe	6	4	4

Final
3	(France) Adrian Mannarino	5	1
4	(Australia) John Millman	7	6

=== Top half ===
First round
(Argentina) F Delbonis	7^{7}	3	2
(Kazakhstan) M Kukushkin	6^{5}	6	6
WC	(Kazakhstan) T Skatov	2	0
Q	(Finland) E Ruusuvuori	6	6
(United Kingdom) C Norrie	7	6^{6}	2
8	(Australia) J Thompson	5	7^{8}	6
Q	(Bosnia and Herzegovina) D Džumhur	1	7	4
Q	(Japan) Y Sugita	6	5	6
Q	(Russia) A Karatsev	3	6	3
WC	(Italy) A Seppi	6	1	6
PR	(United States) M McDonald	6	6
6	(Kazakhstan) A Bublik	3	2

Second round
1	(France) B Paire	7^{7}	6^{2}	1
(Kazakhstan) M Kukushkin	6^{4}	7^{7}	6
Q	(Finland) E Ruusuvuori	6	3	6
8	(Australia) J Thompson	2	6	4
3	(France) A Mannarino	6	6
Q	(Japan) Y Sugita	1	1
WC	(Italy) A Seppi	6	3	3
PR	(United States) M McDonald	3	6	6

Quarterfinals
(Kazakhstan) M Kukushkin	3	1
Q	(Finland) E Ruusuvuori	6	6
3	(France) A Mannarino	6	6
PR	(United States) M McDonald	1	4

Semifinals
Q	(Finland) E Ruusuvuori	5	2
3	(France) A Mannarino	7	6

=== Bottom half ===
First round
7	(United States) T Paul	7^{7}	6
(Italy) S Travaglia	6^{2}	3
WC	(Kazakhstan) D Popko	6	4	4
(Moldova) R Albot	4	6	6
(Spain) F Verdasco	6	7^{7}
(Australia) J Duckworth	4	6^{5}
5	(United States) T Sandgren	4	6^{7}
(Czech Republic) J Veselý	6	7^{9}
(South Africa) L Harris	3	6	6^{3}
(Belarus) E Gerasimov	6	3	7^{7}
(United States) F Tiafoe	6	6
(France) C Moutet	3	2

Second round
7	(United States) T Paul	6	6
(Moldova) R Albot	4	0
(Spain) F Verdasco	3	4
4	(Australia) J Millman	6	6
(Czech Republic) J Veselý	6	3	4
(Belarus) E Gerasimov	4	6	6
(United States) F Tiafoe	7	6
2	(Serbia) M Kecmanović	5	3

Quarterfinals
7	(United States) T Paul	7^{7}	4	6^{5}
4	(Australia) J Millman	6^{5}	6	7^{7}
(Belarus) E Gerasimov	6^{5}	7	5
(United States) F Tiafoe	7^{7}	5	7

Semifinals
4	(Australia) J Millman	3	6	6
(United States) F Tiafoe	6	4	4

== Qualifying ==
=== Seeds ===
1. (Germany) Yannick Hanfmann (qualifying competition)
2. (Finland) Emil Ruusuvuori (qualified)
3. (Japan) Yūichi Sugita (qualified)
4. (Australia) Alexei Popyrin (qualifying competition)
5. (Russia) Aslan Karatsev (qualified)
6. (Bosnia and Herzegovina) Damir Džumhur (qualified)
7. (Australia) Marc Polmans (qualifying competition)
8. (Russia) Evgeny Donskoy (first round)

=== Qualifiers ===
1. (Bosnia and Herzegovina) Damir Džumhur
2. (Finland) Emil Ruusuvuori
3. (Japan) Yūichi Sugita
4. (Russia) Aslan Karatsev

=== Qualifying draw ===
==== First qualifier ====
First round
1	(Germany) Yannick Hanfmann	6	6
(United Kingdom) Liam Broady	2	3
WC	(Kazakhstan) Aleksandr Nedovyesov	6	5	2
6	(Bosnia and Herzegovina) Damir Džumhur	1	7	6

Qualifying competition
1	(Germany) Yannick Hanfmann	4	4
6	(Bosnia and Herzegovina) Damir Džumhur	6	6

==== Second qualifier ====
First round
2	(Finland) Emil Ruusuvuori	6	6
Alt	(Australia) Max Purcell	1	2
(Serbia) Viktor Troicki	6	6
8	(Russia) Evgeny Donskoy	0	4

Qualifying competition
2	(Finland) Emil Ruusuvuori	6	6^{3}	6
(Serbia) Viktor Troicki	3	7^{7}	3

==== Third qualifier ====
First round
3	(Japan) Yūichi Sugita	6	6
(Egypt) Mohamed Safwat	0	2
WC	(Kazakhstan) Denis Yevseyev	7	3	0
7	(Australia) Marc Polmans	5	6	6

Qualifying competition
3	(Japan) Yūichi Sugita	3	6	7^{7}
7	(Australia) Marc Polmans	6	2	6^{5}

==== Fourth qualifier ====
First round
4	(Australia) Alexei Popyrin	6	4
(Uzbekistan) Denis Istomin	4	4^{r}
(Latvia) Ernests Gulbis	6^{3}	1
5	(Russia) Aslan Karatsev	7^{7}	6

Qualifying competition
4	(Australia) Alexei Popyrin	3	3
5	(Russia) Aslan Karatsev	6	6
