= 2020 Qatar ExxonMobil Open =

- Date: 6–11 January
- Edition: 28th
- Category: ATP Tour 250 series
- Draw: 32S / 16D
- Prize money: $1,465,260
- Surface: Hard / outdoor
- Location: Doha, Qatar
- Venue: Khalifa International Tennis and Squash Complex

Champions

Singles
- (Russia) Andrey Rublev

Doubles
- (India) Rohan Bopanna / (Netherlands) Wesley Koolhof
← 2019 ·	ATP Qatar Open	· 2021 →

The 2020 Qatar Open (also known as 2020 Qatar ExxonMobil Open for sponsorship reasons) was the 28th edition of the Qatar Open, a men's tennis tournament which is played on outdoor hard courts. It was part of the ATP Tour 250 of the 2020 ATP Tour. It took place at the Khalifa International Tennis and Squash Complex in Doha, Qatar from 6 to 11 January 2020. The tournament was awarded the Tournament of the Year award in the 250 category from the 2019 ATP Awards for the third time in five years. Second-seeded Andrey Rublev won the singles title.

== Finals ==
=== Singles ===
- (Russia) Andrey Rublev defeated (France) Corentin Moutet, 6–2, 7–6^{(7–3)}

=== Doubles ===
- (India) Rohan Bopanna / (Netherlands) Wesley Koolhof defeated (United Kingdom) Luke Bambridge / (Mexico) Santiago González, 3–6, 6–2, [10–6]

== Points and prize money ==
=== Point distribution ===
Event	W	F	SF	QF	Round of 16	Round of 32	Q	Q2	Q1
Singles	250	150	90	45	20	0	12	6	0
Doubles	250	150	90	45	0	—	—	—	—

=== Prize money ===
Event	W	F	SF	QF	Round of 16	Round of 32	Q2	Q1
Singles	$227,930	$126,160	$71,030	$40,425	$23,190	$13,560	$6,625	$3,445
Doubles	$76,870	$39,400	$21,350	$12,220	$7,150	—	—	—
Doubles prize money per team

== Singles main-draw entrants ==
=== Seeds ===
Country	Player	Rank^{1}	Seed
SUI	Stan Wawrinka	16	1
RUS	Andrey Rublev	23	2
FRA	Jo-Wilfried Tsonga	29	3
CAN	Milos Raonic	31	4
SRB	Laslo Đere	38	5
SRB	Filip Krajinović	40	6
FRA	Adrian Mannarino	43	7
USA	Frances Tiafoe	47	8

- ^{1} Rankings are as of 30 December 2019.

=== Other entrants ===
The following players received wildcards into the singles main draw:

- (Italy) Marco Cecchinato
- (Tunisia) Malek Jaziri
- (Turkey) Cem İlkel

The following players received entry from the qualifying draw:

- (France) Grégoire Barrère
- (Hungary) Márton Fucsovics
- (France) Corentin Moutet
- (Sweden) Mikael Ymer

=== Withdrawals ===
- (Ukraine) Alexandr Dolgopolov → replaced by (United States) Tennys Sandgren
- (France) Richard Gasquet → replaced by (United Kingdom) Kyle Edmund

== Doubles main-draw entrants ==
=== Seeds ===
Country	Player	Country	Player	Rank^{1}	Seed
CRO	Mate Pavić	BRA	Bruno Soares	39	1
FIN	Henri Kontinen	CRO	Franko Škugor	52	2
IND	Rohan Bopanna	NED	Wesley Koolhof	52	3
FRA	Jérémy Chardy	FRA	Fabrice Martin	59	4

- ^{1} Rankings are as of 30 December 2019.

=== Other entrants ===
The following pairs received wildcards into the doubles main draw:

- ~~(Hungary) Márton Fucsovics / (Spain) Fernando Verdasco~~
- (Tunisia) Malek Jaziri / (Qatar) Rashed Nawaf

The following pair received entry as alternates:

- (Belarus) Egor Gerasimov / (Kazakhstan) Mikhail Kukushkin

=== Withdrawals ===
Before the tournament

- (Spain) Fernando Verdasco
