= 2020 ABN AMRO World Tennis Tournament =

- Date: 10–16 February
- Edition: 47th
- Category: ATP Tour 500
- Draw: 32S / 16D
- Prize money: €2,155,295
- Surface: Hard / indoor
- Location: Rotterdam, Netherlands
- Venue: Rotterdam Ahoy

Champions

Singles
- (France) Gaël Monfils

Doubles
- (France) Pierre-Hugues Herbert / (France) Nicolas Mahut

Wheelchair singles
- (United Kingdom) Alfie Hewett

Wheelchair doubles
- (United Kingdom) Alfie Hewett / (United Kingdom) Gordon Reid
- Rotterdam Open

The 2020 ABN AMRO World Tennis Tournament (or Rotterdam Open) was a men's tennis tournament played on indoor hard courts. It took place at the Rotterdam Ahoy arena in the Dutch city of Rotterdam, between 10 and 16 February 2020. It was the 47th edition of the Rotterdam Open, and part of the ATP Tour 500 series on the 2020 ATP Tour. The tournament also included a Men's Wheelchair Tennis Singles and Doubles draw.

== Finals ==
=== Singles ===
- (France) Gaël Monfils defeated (Canada) Félix Auger-Aliassime, 6–2, 6–4

=== Doubles ===
- (France) Pierre-Hugues Herbert / (France) Nicolas Mahut defeated (Finland) Henri Kontinen / (Germany) Jan-Lennard Struff, 7–6^{(7–5)}, 4–6, [10–7]

== Singles main-draw entrants ==
=== Seeds ===
Country	Player	Ranking^{1}	Seed
RUS	Daniil Medvedev	5	1
GRE	Stefanos Tsitsipas	6	2
FRA	Gaël Monfils	9	3
BEL	David Goffin	10	4
ITA	Fabio Fognini	11	5
ESP	Roberto Bautista Agut	12	6
RUS	Andrey Rublev	15	7
CAN	Denis Shapovalov	16	8

- ^{1} Rankings as of 3 February 2020.

=== Other entrants ===
The following players received wildcards into the main draw:

- (Netherlands) Tallon Griekspoor
- (Netherlands) Robin Haase
- (Italy) Jannik Sinner

The following player received entry as a special exempt:

- (Canada) Vasek Pospisil

The following players received entry from the qualifying draw:

- (France) Grégoire Barrère
- (Hungary) Márton Fucsovics
- (Germany) Philipp Kohlschreiber
- (Kazakhstan) Mikhail Kukushkin

=== Withdrawals ===
Before the tournament

- (France) Lucas Pouille → replaced by (Slovenia) Aljaž Bedene
- (France) Jo-Wilfried Tsonga → replaced by (France) Gilles Simon
- (Switzerland) Stan Wawrinka → replaced by (Kazakhstan) Alexander Bublik

During the tournament

- (Moldova) Radu Albot

== Doubles main-draw entrants ==
=== Seeds ===
Country	Player	Country	Player	Rank^{1}	Seed
GER	Kevin Krawietz	GER	Andreas Mies	23	1
FRA	Pierre-Hugues Herbert	FRA	Nicolas Mahut	36	2
NED	Wesley Koolhof	CRO	Nikola Mektić	36	3
NED	Jean-Julien Rojer	ROU	Horia Tecău	37	4

- ^{1} Rankings as of February 3, 2020.

=== Other entrants ===
The following pairs received wildcards into the doubles main draw:

- (Netherlands) Sander Arends / (Netherlands) David Pel
- (Greece) Stefanos Tsitsipas / (Serbia) Nenad Zimonjić

The following pair received entry from the qualifying draw:

- (Finland) Henri Kontinen / (Germany) Jan-Lennard Struff

=== Withdrawals ===
During the tournament

- (Italy) Fabio Fognini (leg injury)
