= 2020 Astana Open =

- Date: 26 October–1 November
- Edition: 1st
- Category: ATP Tour 250
- Prize money: $337,000
- Surface: Hard / indoor
- Location: Nur-Sultan, Kazakhstan
- Venue: Daulet National Tennis Centre

Champions

Singles
- (Australia) John Millman

Doubles
- (Belgium) Sander Gillé / (Belgium) Joran Vliegen
Astana Open	· 2021 →

The 2020 Astana Open is an ATP tournament organised for male professional tennis players, held in Nur-Sultan, Kazakhstan, at the end of October 2020 on indoor hard courts. It was primarily organised due to the cancellation of many tournaments during the 2020 season, because of the ongoing COVID-19 pandemic. It is the first edition of the tournament and it took place in Nur-Sultan, Kazakhstan, from October 26 through November 1, 2020.

== Singles main draw entrants ==
=== Seeds ===
Country	Player	Rank^{1}	Seed
FRA	Benoît Paire	27	1
SRB	Miomir Kecmanović	39	2
FRA	Adrian Mannarino	41	3
AUS	John Millman	44	4
USA	Tennys Sandgren	48	5
KAZ	Alexander Bublik	51	6
USA	Tommy Paul	59	7
AUS	Jordan Thompson	60	8

- Rankings are as of October 19, 2020.

=== Other entrants ===
The following players received wildcards into the singles main draw:

- (Kazakhstan) Dmitry Popko
- (Italy) Andreas Seppi
- (Kazakhstan) Timofey Skatov

The following player received a protected ranking into the singles main draw:

- (United States) Mackenzie McDonald

The following players received entry from the qualifying draw:

- (Bosnia and Herzegovina) Damir Džumhur
- (Russia) Aslan Karatsev
- (Finland) Emil Ruusuvuori
- (Japan) Yūichi Sugita

=== Withdrawals ===
- (Spain) Pablo Andújar → replaced by (Kazakhstan) Mikhail Kukushkin
- (Serbia) Laslo Đere → replaced by (Argentina) Federico Delbonis
- (France) Richard Gasquet → replaced by (Moldova) Radu Albot
- (Argentina) Juan Ignacio Londero → replaced by (Belarus) Egor Gerasimov
- (France) Gilles Simon → replaced by (United States) Mackenzie McDonald

== Doubles main draw entrants ==
=== Seeds ===
Country	Player	Country	Player	Rank^{1}	Seed
BEL	Sander Gillé	BEL	Joran Vliegen	79	1
AUS	Max Purcell	AUS	Luke Saville	79	2
NZL	Marcus Daniell	AUT	Philipp Oswald	85	3
JPN	Ben McLachlan	CRO	Franko Škugor	86	4

- Rankings are as of October 19, 2020

=== Other entrants ===
The following pairs received wildcards into the doubles main draw:

- (Kazakhstan) Andrey Golubev / (Kazakhstan) Aleksandr Nedovyesov
- (Egypt) Mohamed Safwat / (Kazakhstan) Denis Yevseyev

The following pair received entry using a protected ranking:

- (United States) Mackenzie McDonald / (United States) Tommy Paul

== Champions ==
=== Singles ===
- (Australia) John Millman def. (France) Adrian Mannarino, 7–5, 6–1

=== Doubles ===
- (Belgium) Sander Gillé / (Belgium) Joran Vliegen def. (Australia) Max Purcell / (Australia) Luke Saville, 7–5, 6–3
