= 2020 Astana Open – Doubles =

Doubles
- 2020 Astana Open

Final
- Champions: (Belgium) Sander Gillé (Belgium) Joran Vliegen
- Runners-up: (Australia) Max Purcell (Australia) Luke Saville
- Score: 7–5, 6–3

Events
Singles	Doubles
- Astana Open

Sander Gillé and Joran Vliegen won the title, defeating Max Purcell and Luke Saville in the final, 7–5, 6–3. This was the first edition of the tournament, primarily organised due to the cancellation of many tournaments during the 2020 season, because of the ongoing COVID-19 pandemic.

== Seeds ==
1. (Belgium) Sander Gillé / (Belgium) Joran Vliegen (champions)
2. (Australia) Max Purcell / (Australia) Luke Saville (final)
3. (New Zealand) Marcus Daniell / (Austria) Philipp Oswald (quarterfinals)
4. (Japan) Ben McLachlan / (Croatia) Franko Škugor (semifinals)

== Draw ==
Key

- Q = Qualifier
- WC = Wild card
- LL = Lucky loser
- Alt = Alternate
- ITF = ITF entry
- PR = Protected ranking
- SR = Special ranking
- SE = Special exempt
- JE = Junior exempt
- JR = Junior Accelerator Programme entrant
- CO = College Accelerator Programme entrant
- NG = Next Gen Accelerator Program entrant
- w/o = Walkover
- r = Retired
- d = Defaulted

=== Draw ===
First round
1	(Belgium) S Gillé (Belgium) J Vliegen	6	6
PR	(United States) M McDonald (United States) T Paul	3	4
WC	(Egypt) M Safwat (Kazakhstan) D Yevseyev	3	3
(Israel) J Erlich (Belarus) A Vasilevski	6	6
3	(New Zealand) M Daniell (Austria) P Oswald	6	6
(United Kingdom) D Inglot (Pakistan) A-u-H Qureshi	4	1
(El Salvador) M Arévalo (Bosnia and Herzegovina) T Brkić	6^{5}	7^{7}	[10]
(India) R Bopanna (Denmark) F Nielsen	7^{7}	6^{3}	[5]
(Serbia) N Ćaćić (Brazil) M Demoliner	3	5^{r}
(Netherlands) S Arends (New Zealand) A Sitak	6	4
(Netherlands) M Middelkoop (Monaco) H Nys	6^{4}	7^{10}	[10]
4	(Japan) B McLachlan (Croatia) F Škugor	7^{7}	6^{8}	[12]
(United Kingdom) L Bambridge (India) D Sharan	7	4	[10]
(Uruguay) A Behar (Ecuador) G Escobar	5	6	[6]
WC	(Kazakhstan) A Golubev (Kazakhstan) A Nedovyesov	4	4
2	(Australia) M Purcell (Australia) L Saville	6	6

Quarterfinals
1	(Belgium) S Gillé (Belgium) J Vliegen	w/o
(Israel) J Erlich (Belarus) A Vasilevski
3	(New Zealand) M Daniell (Austria) P Oswald	6^{4}	6	[9]
(El Salvador) M Arévalo (Bosnia and Herzegovina) T Brkić	7^{7}	3	[11]
(Netherlands) S Arends (New Zealand) A Sitak	3	6^{4}
4	(Japan) B McLachlan (Croatia) F Škugor	6	7^{7}
(United Kingdom) L Bambridge (India) D Sharan	3	5
2	(Australia) M Purcell (Australia) L Saville	6	7

Semifinals
1	(Belgium) S Gillé (Belgium) J Vliegen	7^{7}	7^{7}
(El Salvador) M Arévalo (Bosnia and Herzegovina) T Brkić	6^{4}	6^{3}
4	(Japan) B McLachlan (Croatia) F Škugor	6	3	[5]
2	(Australia) M Purcell (Australia) L Saville	4	6	[10]

Final
1	(Belgium) S Gillé (Belgium) J Vliegen	7	6
2	(Australia) M Purcell (Australia) L Saville	5	3
