= 2020 Delray Beach Open =

- Date: February 17–23
- Edition: 28th
- Draw: 32S / 16D
- Surface: Hard / outdoor
- Location: Delray Beach, Florida, United States
- Venue: Delray Beach Tennis Center

Champions

Singles
- (United States) Reilly Opelka

Doubles
- (United States) Bob Bryan / (United States) Mike Bryan
- Delray Beach Open

The 2020 Delray Beach Open was a professional men's tennis tournament played on hard courts. It was the 28th edition of the tournament, and part of the 2020 ATP Tour. It took place in Delray Beach, Florida, United States between 17 February and 23 February 2020.

== Finals ==
=== Singles ===
- (United States) Reilly Opelka defeated (Japan) Yoshihito Nishioka, 7–5, 6–7^{(4–7)}, 6–2

=== Doubles ===
- (United States) Bob Bryan / (United States) Mike Bryan defeated (United Kingdom) Luke Bambridge / (Japan) Ben McLachlan, 3–6, 7–5, [10–5]

== Singles main-draw entrants ==
=== Seeds ===
Country	Player	Rank^{1}	Seed
~~AUS~~	~~Nick Kyrgios~~	~~20~~	~~1~~
CAN	Milos Raonic	32	2
USA	Taylor Fritz	36	3
USA	Reilly Opelka	40	4
AUS	John Millman	41	5
FRA	Ugo Humbert	43	6
FRA	Adrian Mannarino	44	7
MDA	Radu Albot	50	8

- ^{1} Rankings as of February 10, 2020

=== Other entrants ===
The following players received wildcards into the main draw:

- (United States) Ryan Harrison
- (United States) Brandon Nakashima
- (United States) Jack Sock

The following players received entry into the singles main draw using a protected ranking:

- (United States) Mackenzie McDonald
- (Germany) Cedrik-Marcel Stebe

The following player received entry as a special exempt:

- (Chinese Taipei) Jason Jung

The following players received entry from the qualifying draw:

- (Ecuador) Emilio Gómez
- (Latvia) Ernests Gulbis
- (United Kingdom) Cameron Norrie
- (United States) Noah Rubin

The following players received entry as lucky losers:

- (Colombia) Daniel Elahi Galán
- (United States) Stefan Kozlov
- (Uzbekistan) Denis Istomin
- (Australia) Bernard Tomic

=== Withdrawals ===
Before the tournament

- (United Kingdom) Kyle Edmund → replaced by (United States) Stefan Kozlov
- (Australia) Nick Kyrgios → replaced by (Colombia) Daniel Elahi Galán
- (Japan) Kei Nishikori → replaced by (Switzerland) Henri Laaksonen
- (United States) Tennys Sandgren → replaced by (Australia) Bernard Tomic
- (Italy) Andreas Seppi → replaced by (Uzbekistan) Denis Istomin

=== Retirements ===
- (Chinese Taipei) Jason Jung
- (Australia) Jordan Thompson

== Doubles main-draw entrants ==
=== Seeds ===
Country	Player	Country	Player	Rank^{1}	Seed
USA	Bob Bryan	USA	Mike Bryan	52	1
MEX	Santiago González	GBR	Ken Skupski	85	2
NZL	Marcus Daniell	AUT	Philipp Oswald	91	3
GBR	Luke Bambridge	JPN	Ben McLachlan	96	4

- ^{1} Rankings are as of February 10, 2020.

=== Other entrants ===
The following pairs received wildcards into the main draw:

- (United States) Christian Harrison / (United States) Dennis Novikov
- (United States) Nicholas Monroe / (United States) Jackson Withrow

=== Withdrawals ===
Before the tournament

- (Australia) Matt Reid
- (Australia) Jordan Thompson
