= 2020 Qatar ExxonMobil Open – Doubles =

Doubles
- 2020 Qatar ExxonMobil Open

Final
- Champions: (India) Rohan Bopanna (Netherlands) Wesley Koolhof
- Runners-up: (United Kingdom) Luke Bambridge (Mexico) Santiago González
- Score: 3–6, 6–2, [10–6]

Details
- Draw: 16
- Seeds: 4

Events
Singles	Doubles
← 2019 ·	ATP Qatar Open	· 2021 →

David Goffin and Pierre-Hugues Herbert were the defending champions, but Goffin chose to compete at the 2020 ATP Cup instead, while Herbert chose not to participate this week.

Rohan Bopanna and Wesley Koolhof won the title, defeating Luke Bambridge and Santiago González in the final, 3–6, 6–2, [10–6].

== Seeds ==
1. (Croatia) Mate Pavić / (Brazil) Bruno Soares (quarterfinals)
2. (Finland) Henri Kontinen / (Croatia) Franko Škugor (semifinals)
3. (India) Rohan Bopanna / (Netherlands) Wesley Koolhof (champions)
4. (France) Jérémy Chardy / (France) Fabrice Martin (quarterfinals)

== Draw ==
=== Key ===
- Q = Qualifier
- WC = Wild card
- LL = Lucky loser
- Alt = Alternate
- SE = Special exempt
- PR = Protected ranking
- ITF = ITF entry
- JE = Junior exempt
- w/o = Walkover
- r = Retired
- d = Defaulted
- SR = Special ranking

=== Draw ===
First round
1	(Croatia) M Pavić (Brazil) B Soares	6	6
Alt	(Belarus) E Gerasimov (Kazakhstan) M Kukushkin	2	4
(Denmark) F Nielsen (Germany) T Pütz	7^{12}	6^{5}	[10]
(Brazil) M Demoliner (Netherlands) M Middelkoop	6^{10}	7^{7}	[7]
4	(France) J Chardy (France) F Martin	7^{7}	6
(India) D Sharan (New Zealand) A Sitak	6^{4}	2
(Lithuania) R Berankis (Canada) M Raonic	7	6^{5}	[5]
(United Kingdom) L Bambridge (Mexico) S González	5	7^{7}	[10]
(Kazakhstan) A Bublik (Russia) A Rublev	3	6^{6}
(United States) F Tiafoe (Switzerland) S Wawrinka	6	7^{8}
(Italy) M Cecchinato (Italy) L Sonego	3	2
3	(India) R Bopanna (Netherlands) W Koolhof	6	6
(Slovenia) A Bedene (Serbia) L Đere	7^{7}	4	[5]
(United Kingdom) K Skupski (United Kingdom) N Skupski	6^{2}	6	[10]
WC	(Tunisia) M Jaziri (Qatar) R Nawaf	3	1
2	(Finland) H Kontinen (Croatia) F Škugor	6	6

Quarter-finals
1	(Croatia) M Pavić (Brazil) B Soares	6	2	[7]
(Denmark) F Nielsen (Germany) T Pütz	4	6	[10]
4	(France) J Chardy (France) F Martin	3	6^{7}
(United Kingdom) L Bambridge (Mexico) S González	6	7^{9}
(United States) F Tiafoe (Switzerland) S Wawrinka	3	4
3	(India) R Bopanna (Netherlands) W Koolhof	6	6
(United Kingdom) K Skupski (United Kingdom) N Skupski	7^{7}	4	[11]
2	(Finland) H Kontinen (Croatia) F Škugor	6^{2}	6	[13]

Semi-finals
(Denmark) F Nielsen (Germany) T Pütz	6	2	[4]
(United Kingdom) L Bambridge (Mexico) S González	2	6	[10]
3	(India) R Bopanna (Netherlands) W Koolhof	7	6
2	(Finland) H Kontinen (Croatia) F Škugor	5	2

Final
(United Kingdom) L Bambridge (Mexico) S González	6	2	[6]
3	(India) R Bopanna (Netherlands) W Koolhof	3	6	[10]
