= 2020 Argentina Open =

- Date: 10–16 February
- Edition: 23rd
- Category: ATP Tour 250 series
- Draw: 28S / 16D
- Prize money: $611,420
- Surface: Clay / outdoor
- Location: Buenos Aires, Argentina
- Venue: Buenos Aires Lawn Tennis Club

Champions

Singles
- (Norway) Casper Ruud

Doubles
- (Spain) Marcel Granollers / (Argentina) Horacio Zeballos
← 2019 ·	ATP Buenos Aires	· 2021 →

The 2020 Argentina Open was a men's tennis tournament played on outdoor clay courts. It was the 23rd edition of the ATP Buenos Aires event, and part of the ATP Tour 250 series of the 2020 ATP Tour. It took place in Buenos Aires, Argentina, from February 10 through 16, 2020.

== Singles main draw entrants ==
=== Seeds ===
Country	Player	Rank^{1}	Seed
ARG	Diego Schwartzman	14	1
ARG	Guido Pella	22	2
SRB	Dušan Lajović	24	3
CRO	Borna Ćorić	30	4
CHI	Cristian Garín	31	5
SRB	Laslo Đere	39	6
ESP	Albert Ramos Viñolas	42	7
NOR	Casper Ruud	45	8

- ^{1} Rankings are as of February 3, 2020.

=== Other entrants ===
The following players received wildcards into the singles main draw:

- (Argentina) Francisco Cerúndolo
- (Argentina) Facundo Díaz Acosta
- (Argentina) Leonardo Mayer

The following player received entry as a special exempt:

- (Slovakia) Andrej Martin

The following players received entry from the qualifying draw:

- (Argentina) Facundo Bagnis
- (Slovakia) Filip Horanský
- (Slovakia) Jozef Kovalík
- (Spain) Pedro Martínez

The following players received entry as lucky losers:

- (Portugal) João Domingues
- (Portugal) Pedro Sousa

=== Withdrawals ===
Before the tournament

- (Italy) Matteo Berrettini → replaced by (France) Corentin Moutet
- (Chile) Cristian Garín → replaced by (Portugal) Pedro Sousa
- (Chile) Nicolás Jarry (suspension) → replaced by (Spain) Jaume Munar
- (Austria) Dominic Thiem → replaced by (Spain) Roberto Carballés Baena
- (Spain) Fernando Verdasco → replaced by (Portugal) João Domingues

During the tournament

- (Argentina) Diego Schwartzman

== Doubles main draw entrants ==
=== Seeds ===
Country	Player	Country	Player	Rank^{1}	Seed
ESP	Marcel Granollers	ARG	Horacio Zeballos	24	1
ARG	Máximo González	FRA	Fabrice Martin	54	2
BEL	Sander Gillé	BEL	Joran Vliegen	82	3
BRA	Marcelo Demoliner	NED	Matwé Middelkoop	117	4

- ^{1} Rankings are as of February 3, 2020.

=== Other entrants ===
The following pairs received wildcards into the doubles main draw:

- (Argentina) Andrea Collarini / (Argentina) Federico Coria
- (Argentina) Facundo Díaz Acosta / (Spain) Carlos Taberner

The following pair received entry as alternates:

- (Spain) Pablo Andújar / (Spain) Pedro Martínez

=== Withdrawals ===
Before the tournament

- (Chile) Cristian Garín

During the tournament

- (Spain) Pablo Andújar
- (Uruguay) Pablo Cuevas

== Finals ==
=== Singles ===
- (Norway) Casper Ruud defeated (Portugal) Pedro Sousa, 6–1, 6–4

=== Doubles ===
- (Spain) Marcel Granollers / (Argentina) Horacio Zeballos defeated (Argentina) Guillermo Durán / (Argentina) Juan Ignacio Londero, 6–4, 5–7, [18–16]
