= 2020 Qatar ExxonMobil Open – Singles =

Singles
- 2020 Qatar ExxonMobil Open

Final
- Champion: (Russia) Andrey Rublev
- Runner-up: (France) Corentin Moutet
- Score: 6–2, 7–6^{(7–3)}

Details
- Draw: 28 (4 Q / 3 WC )
- Seeds: 8

Events
Singles	Doubles
- ATP Qatar Open

Roberto Bautista Agut was the defending champion, but chose to compete in the ATP Cup instead.

Andrey Rublev won the title, defeating Corentin Moutet in the final, 6–2, 7–6^{(7–3)}.

== Seeds ==
1. (Switzerland) Stan Wawrinka (semifinals)
2. (Russia) Andrey Rublev (champion)
3. (France) Jo-Wilfried Tsonga (second round)
4. (Canada) Milos Raonic (second round)
5. (Serbia) Laslo Đere (second round)
6. (Serbia) Filip Krajinović (second round)
7. (France) Adrian Mannarino (first round)
8. (United States) Frances Tiafoe (first round)

== Draw ==
Key

- Q = Qualifier
- WC = Wild card
- LL = Lucky loser
- Alt = Alternate
- ITF = ITF entry
- PR = Protected ranking
- SR = Special ranking
- SE = Special exempt
- JE = Junior exempt
- JR = Junior Accelerator Programme entrant
- CO = College Accelerator Programme entrant
- NG = Next Gen Accelerator Program entrant
- w/o = Walkover
- r = Retired
- d = Defaulted

=== Finals ===
Semifinals
1	(Switzerland) Stan Wawrinka	6	5	3
Q	(France) Corentin Moutet	3	7	6
(Serbia) Miomir Kecmanović	3	1
2	(Russia) Andrey Rublev	6	6

Final
Q	(France) Corentin Moutet	2	6^{3}
2	(Russia) Andrey Rublev	6	7^{7}

=== Top half ===
First round
Q	(France) G Barrère	3	6	3
(France) J Chardy	6	3	6
Q	(Sweden) M Ymer	6	4	3
(Slovenia) A Bedene	3	6	6
(Kazakhstan) A Bublik	6	6
7	(France) A Mannarino	3	4
Q	(France) C Moutet	7^{7}	6
(United States) T Sandgren	6^{3}	4
(Spain) F Verdasco	6	6
(Spain) P Andújar	4	3
(United Kingdom) K Edmund	6	3	3
6	(Serbia) F Krajinović	4	6	6

Second round
1	(Switzerland) S Wawrinka	6	6
(France) J Chardy	3	4
(Slovenia) A Bedene	6	7
(Kazakhstan) A Bublik	3	5
4	(Canada) M Raonic	6^{4}	6^{4}
Q	(France) C Moutet	7^{7}	7^{7}
(Spain) F Verdasco	7	4	6
6	(Serbia) F Krajinović	5	6	0

Quarter-finals
1	(Switzerland) S Wawrinka	6	6
(Slovenia) A Bedene	3	4
Q	(France) C Moutet	6	4	6
(Spain) F Verdasco	4	6	4

Semi-finals
1	(Switzerland) S Wawrinka	6	5	3
Q	(France) C Moutet	3	7	6

=== Bottom half ===
First round
8	(United States) F Tiafoe	4	6	4
Q	(Hungary) M Fucsovics	6	4	6
WC	(Turkey) C İlkel	6	4	6
(Lithuania) R Berankis	2	6	2
(Serbia) M Kecmanović	6	6
(Australia) J Thompson	4	2
5	(Serbia) L Đere	6	3	6
(Italy) L Sonego	1	6	2
WC	(Italy) M Cecchinato	3	4
(France) P-H Herbert	6	6
WC	(Tunisia) M Jaziri	0	3
(Kazakhstan) M Kukushkin	6	6

Second round
Q	(Hungary) M Fucsovics	6	6
WC	(Turkey) C İlkel	1	4
(Serbia) M Kecmanović	7^{11}	6
3	(France) J-W Tsonga	6^{9}	1
5	(Serbia) L Đere	1	3
(France) P-H Herbert	6	6
(Kazakhstan) M Kukushkin	4	2
2	(Russia) A Rublev	6	6

Quarter-finals
Q	(Hungary) M Fucsovics	2	0
(Serbia) M Kecmanović	6	6
(France) P-H Herbert	4	3
2	(Russia) A Rublev	6	6

Semi-finals
(Serbia) M Kecmanović	3	1
2	(Russia) A Rublev	6	6

== Qualifying ==
=== Seeds ===
1. (Hungary) Márton Fucsovics (qualified)
2. (Sweden) Mikael Ymer (qualified)
3. (France) Grégoire Barrère (qualified)
4. (France) Corentin Moutet (qualified)
5. (Spain) Alejandro Davidovich Fokina (qualifying competition)
6. (Brazil) Thiago Monteiro (qualifying competition)
7. (Bosnia and Herzegovina) Damir Džumhur (first round)
8. (Croatia) Ivo Karlović (first round)

=== Qualifiers ===
1. (Hungary) Márton Fucsovics
2. (Sweden) Mikael Ymer
3. (France) Grégoire Barrère
4. (France) Corentin Moutet

=== Qualifying draw ===
==== First qualifier ====
First round
1	(Hungary) Márton Fucsovics	6	1	6
(Belarus) Egor Gerasimov	4	6	3
(Czech Republic) Jiří Veselý	6^{10}	6	6
8	(Croatia) Ivo Karlović	7^{12}	3	2

Qualifying competition
1	(Hungary) Márton Fucsovics	4	6	6
(Czech Republic) Jiří Veselý	6	1	4

==== Second qualifier ====
First round
2	(Sweden) Mikael Ymer	6	6
WC	(Qatar) Mousa Shanan Zayed	1	1
(Italy) Gianluca Mager	3	2
5	(Spain) Alejandro Davidovich Fokina	6	6

Qualifying competition
2	(Sweden) Mikael Ymer	3	7	6
5	(Spain) Alejandro Davidovich Fokina	6	5	4

==== Third qualifier ====
First round
3	(France) Grégoire Barrère	6	4	6
(Italy) Salvatore Caruso	2	6	3
WC	(Qatar) Rashed Nawaf	2	0
6	(Brazil) Thiago Monteiro	6	6

Qualifying competition
3	(France) Grégoire Barrère	6	6
6	(Brazil) Thiago Monteiro	4	4

==== Fourth qualifier ====
First round
4	(France) Corentin Moutet	6	6
(Slovakia) Andrej Martin	4	4
(Australia) Alexei Popyrin	4	7^{7}	7
7	(Bosnia and Herzegovina) Damir Džumhur	6	6^{5}	5

Qualifying competition
4	(France) Corentin Moutet	6	6
(Australia) Alexei Popyrin	2	4
