= 2020 ABN AMRO World Tennis Tournament – Doubles =

Doubles
- 2020 ABN AMRO World Tennis Tournament

Final
- Champions: (France) Pierre-Hugues Herbert; (France) Nicolas Mahut
- Runners-up: (Finland) Henri Kontinen; (Germany) Jan-Lennard Struff
- Score: 7–6^{(7–5)}, 4–6, [10–7]

Details
- Draw: 16
- Seeds: 4

Events
Singles	Doubles
← 2019 ·	ABN AMRO World Tennis Tournament	· 2021 →

Jérémy Chardy and Henri Kontinen were the defending champions, but Chardy chose not to participate this year.

Pierre-Hugues Herbert and Nicolas Mahut won the title, defeating Kontinen and Jan-Lennard Struff in the final, 7–6^{(7–5)}, 4–6, [10–7].

== Seeds ==
1. (Germany) Kevin Krawietz / (Germany) Andreas Mies (first round)
2. (France) Pierre-Hugues Herbert / (France) Nicolas Mahut (champions)
3. (Netherlands) Wesley Koolhof / (Croatia) Nikola Mektić (first round)
4. (Netherlands) Jean-Julien Rojer / (Romania) Horia Tecău (quarterfinals)

== Draw ==
Key

- Q = Qualifier
- WC = Wild card
- LL = Lucky loser
- Alt = Alternate
- ITF = ITF entry
- PR = Protected ranking
- SR = Special ranking
- SE = Special exempt
- JE = Junior exempt
- JR = Junior Accelerator Programme entrant
- CO = College Accelerator Programme entrant
- NG = Next Gen Accelerator Program entrant
- w/o = Walkover
- r = Retired
- d = Defaulted

First round

Quarterfinals

Semifinals

Final

1
- (Germany) K Krawietz
- (Germany) A Mies
2
2

Q
(Finland) H Kontinen
(Germany) J-L Struff
6
6

Q
(Finland) H Kontinen
(Germany) J-L Struff
5
6
[10]

(United Kingdom) J Murray
(United Kingdom) N Skupski
7^{7}
5
[10]

- (United Kingdom) J Murray
- (United Kingdom) N Skupski
7
1
[6]

- (Austria) J Melzer
- (France) É Roger-Vasselin
6^{4}
7
[7]

Q
(Finland) H Kontinen
(Germany) J-L Struff
5
6
[10]

4
(Netherlands) J-J Rojer
(Romania) H Tecău
6
6

- (India) R Bopanna
- (Canada) D Shapovalov
7
2
[8]

WC
- (Greece) S Tsitsipas
- (Serbia) N Zimonjić
2
2

4
- (Netherlands) J-J Rojer
- (Romania) H Tecău
2
6
[7]

(India) R Bopanna
(Canada) D Shapovalov
7^{7}
6^{5}
[10]

(India) R Bopanna
(Canada) D Shapovalov
6
3
[10]

- (Australia) J Peers
- (New Zealand) M Venus
6^{0}
7^{7}
[8]

Q
- (Finland) H Kontinen
- (Germany) J-L Struff
6^{5}
6
[7]

(South Africa) R Klaasen
(Austria) O Marach
6
7

2
(France) P-H Herbert
(France) N Mahut
7^{7}
4
[10]

WC
- (Netherlands) S Arends
- (Netherlands) D Pel
3
5

(South Africa) R Klaasen
(Austria) O Marach
6
6^{5}
[10]

(Canada) F Auger-Aliassime
(Poland) H Hurkacz
6
7^{11}

- (Canada) F Auger-Aliassime
- (Poland) H Hurkacz
4
7^{7}
[8]

3
- (Netherlands) W Koolhof
- (Croatia) N Mektić
3
6^{9}

- (South Africa) R Klaasen
- (Austria) O Marach
7^{8}
6^{6}
[7]

- (Russia) K Khachanov
- (Russia) A Rublev
6^{1}
6^{11}

2
(France) P-H Herbert
(France) N Mahut
6^{6}
7^{8}
[10]

(Italy) F Fognini
(Netherlands) R Haase
7^{7}
7^{13}

- (Italy) F Fognini
- (Netherlands) R Haase

- (France) B Paire
- (Croatia) M Pavić
3
4

2
(France) P-H Herbert
(France) N Mahut
w/o

2
(France) P-H Herbert
(France) N Mahut
6
6

== Qualifying ==
=== Seeds ===
1. (Finland) Henri Kontinen / (Germany) Jan-Lennard Struff (qualified)
2. (Kazakhstan) Alexander Bublik / (Ukraine) Sergiy Stakhovsky (first round)

=== Qualifiers ===
1. (Finland) Henri Kontinen / (Germany) Jan-Lennard Struff

=== Qualifying draw ===
First round

Qualifying competition

1
(Finland) Henri Kontinen
(Germany) Jan-Lennard Struff
6
3
[10]

- (Finland) Emil Ruusuvuori
- (Italy) Jannik Sinner
4
6
[6]

1
(Finland) Henri Kontinen
(Germany) Jan-Lennard Struff
6
7

WC
- (Netherlands) Tallon Griekspoor
- (Netherlands) Botic van de Zandschulp
3
5

WC
(Netherlands) Tallon Griekspoor
(Netherlands) Botic van de Zandschulp
6
6^{5}
[10]

2
- (Kazakhstan) Alexander Bublik
- (Ukraine) Sergiy Stakhovsky
3
7^{7}
[5]
