= 2020 Delray Beach Open – Doubles =

Doubles
- 2020 Delray Beach Open

Final
- Champions: (United States) Bob Bryan (United States) Mike Bryan
- Runners-up: (United Kingdom) Luke Bambridge (Japan) Ben McLachlan
- Score: 3–6, 7–5, [10–5]

Events
Singles	Doubles
- Delray Beach Open

Defending champions Bob and Mike Bryan defeated Luke Bambridge and Ben McLachlan in the final, 3–6, 7–5, [10–5] to win the doubles tennis title at the 2020 Delray Beach Open. It was their last ATP Tour title and appearance.

== Seeds ==
1. (United States) Bob Bryan / (United States) Mike Bryan (champions)
2. (Mexico) Santiago González / (United Kingdom) Ken Skupski (first round)
3. (New Zealand) Marcus Daniell / (Austria) Philipp Oswald (first round)
4. (United Kingdom) Luke Bambridge / (Japan) Ben McLachlan (final)

== Draw ==
Key

- Q = Qualifier
- WC = Wild card
- LL = Lucky loser
- Alt = Alternate
- ITF = ITF entry
- PR = Protected ranking
- SR = Special ranking
- SE = Special exempt
- JE = Junior exempt
- JR = Junior Accelerator Programme entrant
- CO = College Accelerator Programme entrant
- NG = Next Gen Accelerator Program entrant
- w/o = Walkover
- r = Retired
- d = Defaulted

=== Draw ===
First round
1	(United States) B Bryan (United States) M Bryan	w/o
(Australia) N Kyrgios (Australia) J Thompson
(Sweden) A Göransson (France) U Humbert	7	4	[7]
(India) D Sharan (New Zealand) A Sitak	5	6	[10]
3	(New Zealand) M Daniell (Austria) P Oswald	4	2
(El Salvador) M Arévalo (United Kingdom) J O'Mara	6	6
(United Kingdom) D Inglot (Sweden) R Lindstedt	4	4
WC	(United States) C Harrison (United States) D Novikov	6	6
WC	(United States) N Monroe (United States) J Withrow	7^{7}	6
PR	(France) A Mannarino (United States) M McDonald	6^{3}	3
(Australia) J Millman (Australia) M Reid
4	(United Kingdom) L Bambridge (Japan) B McLachlan	w/o
(United States) T Fritz (United States) T Paul	7^{7}	7
(Serbia) M Kecmanović (Croatia) A Pavić	6^{5}	5
(Serbia) N Ćaćić (Monaco) H Nys	6	2	[10]
2	(Mexico) S González (United Kingdom) K Skupski	4	6	[4]

Quarterfinals
1	(United States) B Bryan (United States) M Bryan	6	4	[10]
(India) D Sharan (New Zealand) A Sitak	2	6	[3]
(El Salvador) M Arévalo (United Kingdom) J O'Mara	6	6
WC	(United States) C Harrison (United States) D Novikov	4	4
WC	(United States) N Monroe (United States) J Withrow	2	6^{3}
4	(United Kingdom) L Bambridge (Japan) B McLachlan	6	7^{7}
(United States) T Fritz (United States) T Paul	6^{4}	4
(Serbia) N Ćaćić (Monaco) H Nys	7^{7}	6

Semifinals
1	(United States) B Bryan (United States) M Bryan	6^{5}	6	[10]
(El Salvador) M Arévalo (United Kingdom) J O'Mara	7^{7}	4	[4]
4	(United Kingdom) L Bambridge (Japan) B McLachlan	7^{7}	7
(Serbia) N Ćaćić (Monaco) H Nys	6^{1}	5

Final
1	(United States) B Bryan (United States) M Bryan	3	7	[10]
4	(United Kingdom) L Bambridge (Japan) B McLachlan	6	5	[5]
