= 2020 Argentina Open – Doubles =

Doubles
- 2020 Argentina Open

Final
- Champions: (Spain) Marcel Granollers (Argentina) Horacio Zeballos
- Runners-up: (Argentina) Guillermo Durán (Argentina) Juan Ignacio Londero
- Score: 6–4, 5–7, [18–16]

Events
Singles	Doubles
- Argentina Open

Máximo González and Horacio Zeballos were the defending champions, but chose not to participate together. González played alongside Fabrice Martin, but lost in the first round to Pablo Andújar and Pedro Martínez.

Zeballos teamed up with Marcel Granollers and successfully defended the title, defeating Guillermo Durán and Juan Ignacio Londero in the final, 6–4, 5–7, [18–16].

== Seeds ==
1. (Spain) Marcel Granollers / (Argentina) Horacio Zeballos (champions)
2. (Argentina) Máximo González / (France) Fabrice Martin (first round)
3. (Belgium) Sander Gillé / (Belgium) Joran Vliegen (semifinals)
4. (Brazil) Marcelo Demoliner / (Netherlands) Matwé Middelkoop (semifinals)

== Draw ==
Key

- Q = Qualifier
- WC = Wild card
- LL = Lucky loser
- Alt = Alternate
- ITF = ITF entry
- PR = Protected ranking
- SR = Special ranking
- SE = Special exempt
- JE = Junior exempt
- JR = Junior Accelerator Programme entrant
- CO = College Accelerator Programme entrant
- NG = Next Gen Accelerator Program entrant
- w/o = Walkover
- r = Retired
- d = Defaulted

=== Draw ===
First round
1	(Spain) M Granollers (Argentina) H Zeballos	7^{7}	7
(Uruguay) A Behar (Ecuador) G Escobar	6^{3}	5
(Brazil) T Monteiro (Brazil) F Romboli	6	3	[10]
WC	(Argentina) F Díaz Acosta (Spain) C Taberner	3	6	[5]
4	(Brazil) M Demoliner (Netherlands) M Middelkoop	6	6
(Italy) M Cecchinato (Spain) A Ramos Viñolas	4	4
(Argentina) F Bagnis (Argentina) F Delbonis	5	3
(Spain) J Munar (Norway) C Ruud	7	6
(Uruguay) P Cuevas (Bolivia) H Dellien	6	6
(Argentina) L Mayer (Argentina) A Molteni	4	4
WC	(Argentina) A Collarini (Argentina) F Coria	6	1	[2]
3	(Belgium) S Gillé (Belgium) J Vliegen	4	6	[10]
(Argentina) G Durán (Argentina) JI Londero	7	6
(Italy) S Caruso (Italy) L Sonego	5	4
Alt	(Spain) P Andújar (Spain) P Martínez	6	6
2	(Argentina) M González (France) F Martin	3	1

Quarterfinals
1	(Spain) M Granollers (Argentina) H Zeballos	6	6
(Brazil) T Monteiro (Brazil) F Romboli	3	2
4	(Brazil) M Demoliner (Netherlands) M Middelkoop	6	6
(Spain) J Munar (Norway) C Ruud	3	4
(Uruguay) P Cuevas (Bolivia) H Dellien
3	(Belgium) S Gillé (Belgium) J Vliegen	w/o
(Argentina) G Durán (Argentina) JI Londero	w/o
Alt	(Spain) P Andújar (Spain) P Martínez

Semifinals
1	(Spain) M Granollers (Argentina) H Zeballos	6	7
4	(Brazil) M Demoliner (Netherlands) M Middelkoop	2	5
3	(Belgium) S Gillé (Belgium) J Vliegen	6^{4}	4
(Argentina) G Durán (Argentina) JI Londero	7^{7}	6

Final
1	(Spain) M Granollers (Argentina) H Zeballos	6	5	[18]
(Argentina) G Durán (Argentina) JI Londero	4	7	[16]
