= 2020 Argentina Open – Singles =

Singles
- 2020 Argentina Open

Final
- Champion: (Norway) Casper Ruud
- Runner-up: (Portugal) Pedro Sousa
- Score: 6–1, 6–4

Details
- Draw: 28 (4 Q / 3 WC )
- Seeds: 8

Events
Singles	Doubles
← 2019 ·	Argentina Open	· 2021 →

Casper Ruud became the first Norwegian to win an ATP title, defeating Pedro Sousa in the final, 6–1, 6–4.

Marco Cecchinato was the defending champion, but lost in the first round to Roberto Carballés Baena.

== Seeds ==
The top four seeds received a bye into the second round.

1. (Argentina) Diego Schwartzman (semifinals, withdrew)
2. (Argentina) Guido Pella (quarterfinals)
3. (Serbia) Dušan Lajović (quarterfinals)
4. (Croatia) Borna Ćorić (second round)
5. (Chile) Cristian Garín (withdrew)
6. (Serbia) Laslo Đere (second round)
7. (Spain) Albert Ramos Viñolas (second round)
8. (Norway) Casper Ruud (champion)

== Draw ==
=== Key ===
- Q = Qualifier
- WC = Wild card
- LL = Lucky loser
- Alt = Alternate
- SE = Special exempt
- PR = Protected ranking
- ITF = ITF entry
- JE = Junior exempt
- w/o = Walkover
- r = Retired
- d = Defaulted
- SR = Special ranking

=== Finals ===
Semifinals
1	(Argentina) Diego Schwartzman
LL	(Portugal) Pedro Sousa	w/o
8	(Norway) Casper Ruud	4	7	6
(Argentina) Juan Ignacio Londero	6	5	1

Final
LL	(Portugal) Pedro Sousa	1	4
8	(Norway) Casper Ruud	6	6

=== Top half ===
First round
(Argentina) F Delbonis	1	6	7
(Bolivia) H Dellien	6	3	5
(Italy) L Sonego	4	4
(Uruguay) P Cuevas	6	6
WC	(Argentina) L Mayer	6	3	5
7	(Spain) A Ramos Viñolas	4	6	7
(Spain) J Munar	3	3
(Brazil) T Monteiro	6	6
(France) C Moutet	3	6^{4}
Q	(Slovakia) J Kovalík	6	7^{7}
WC	(Argentina) F Díaz Acosta	6	2	3
LL	(Portugal) P Sousa	4	6	6

Second round
1	(Argentina) D Schwartzman	6	4	6
(Argentina) F Delbonis	3	6	2
(Uruguay) P Cuevas	6	4	6
7	(Spain) A Ramos Viñolas	4	6	4
4	(Croatia) B Ćorić	4	6^{6}
(Brazil) T Monteiro	6	7^{8}
Q	(Slovakia) J Kovalík	6^{3}	6^{5}
LL	(Portugal) P Sousa	7^{7}	7^{7}

Quarterfinals
1	(Argentina) D Schwartzman	5	7^{13}	7
(Uruguay) P Cuevas	7	6^{11}	5
(Brazil) T Monteiro	6^{5}	4
LL	(Portugal) P Sousa	7^{7}	6

Semifinals
1	(Argentina) D Schwartzman
LL	(Portugal) P Sousa	w/o

=== Bottom half ===
First round
8	(Norway) C Ruud	6	6
(Spain) P Andújar	2	3
(Italy) M Cecchinato	4	6^{3}
(Spain) R Carballés Baena	6	7^{7}
LL	(Portugal) J Domingues	6^{0}	5
Q	(Spain) P Martínez	7^{7}	7
6	(Serbia) L Đere	6	2	6
WC	(Argentina) F Cerúndolo	2	6	4
Q	(Slovakia) F Horanský	4	6	2
(Argentina) JI Londero	6	4	6
SE	(Slovakia) A Martin	4	1
Q	(Argentina) F Bagnis	6	6

Second round
8	(Norway) C Ruud	6	6
(Spain) R Carballés Baena	1	0
Q	(Spain) P Martínez	6^{6}	6^{6}
3	(Serbia) D Lajović	7^{8}	7^{8}
6	(Serbia) L Đere	7^{7}	2	1
(Argentina) JI Londero	6^{3}	6	6
Q	(Argentina) F Bagnis	6^{2}	7^{7}	4
2	(Argentina) G Pella	7^{7}	6^{2}	6

Quarterfinals
8	(Norway) C Ruud	7	6
3	(Serbia) D Lajović	5	1
(Argentina) JI Londero	6	7^{7}
2	(Argentina) G Pella	4	6^{4}

Semifinals
8	(Norway) C Ruud	4	7	6
(Argentina) JI Londero	6	5	1

== Qualifying ==
=== Seeds ===
1. (Spain) Alejandro Davidovich Fokina (first round)
2. (Italy) Salvatore Caruso (first round)
3. (Hungary) Attila Balázs (first round)
4. (Argentina) Federico Coria (first round)
5. (Italy) Federico Gaio (first round)
6. (Slovakia) Jozef Kovalík (qualified)
7. (Italy) Gianluca Mager (first round)
8. (Argentina) Facundo Bagnis (qualified)

=== Qualifiers ===
1. (Slovakia) Jozef Kovalík
2. (Argentina) Facundo Bagnis
3. (Spain) Pedro Martínez
4. (Slovakia) Filip Horanský

=== Lucky losers ===
1. (Portugal) Pedro Sousa
2. (Portugal) João Domingues

=== Qualifying draw ===
==== First qualifier ====
First round
1	(Spain) Alejandro Davidovich Fokina	4	2
WC	(Argentina) Hernán Casanova	6	6
Alt	(Spain) Mario Vilella Martínez	6	0	4
6	(Slovakia) Jozef Kovalík	3	6	6

Qualifying competition
WC	(Argentina) Hernán Casanova	2	1
6	(Slovakia) Jozef Kovalík	6	6

==== Second qualifier ====
First round
2	(Italy) Salvatore Caruso	4	5
(Portugal) Pedro Sousa	6	7
(Italy) Alessandro Giannessi	3	7	1
8	(Argentina) Facundo Bagnis	6	5	6

Qualifying competition
(Portugal) Pedro Sousa	2	6	2
8	(Argentina) Facundo Bagnis	6	2	6

==== Third qualifier ====
First round
3	(Hungary) Attila Balázs	7	4	4
(Spain) Pedro Martínez	5	6	6
WC	(Argentina) Juan Manuel Cerúndolo	3	6	6
7	(Italy) Gianluca Mager	6	0	1

Qualifying competition
(Spain) Pedro Martínez	7	6
WC	(Argentina) Juan Manuel Cerúndolo	5	0

==== Fourth qualifier ====
First round
4	(Argentina) Federico Coria	2	3
Alt	(Portugal) João Domingues	6	6
(Slovakia) Filip Horanský	6	7
5	(Italy) Federico Gaio	3	5

Qualifying competition
Alt	(Portugal) João Domingues	0	6^{5}
(Slovakia) Filip Horanský	6	7^{7}
