= Rashed Nawaf =

Qatari tennis player (born 2005)

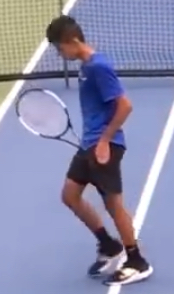
- Nawaf in 2020
- Country (sports): Qatar
- Residence: Qatar
- Born: 1 June 2005 (age 21) Doha, Qatar
- Height: 173
- Turned pro: 2024
- Plays: Right-handed
- Prize money: $400,000

Singles
- Career record: 0-0
- Career titles: 0
- Highest ranking: No.529
- Current ranking: —

Doubles
- Career record: 0–1
- Career titles: 0
- Last updated on: 24 February 2024.

Rashed Nawaf (born 1 June 2005) is a Qatari professional padel player and ex professional tennis player. He is ranked number 1 in Qatar and Asia and also won the historical asian games gold medal , He has a career high fip ranking of 328 achieved on 22nd of April 2025.

Nawaf represents Qatar Padel national team.

== Career ==
He had promising results as a junior, winning the Asian 14 & under Championships and finished as runner-up at the Junior Orange Bowl.

He made his ATP main draw debut at the 2020 Qatar ExxonMobil Open in the doubles draw partnering Malek Jaziri.

Since 2018, Nawaf trains at Mouratoglou Tennis Academy.
