= 2020 Rafael Nadal tennis season =

Statistics for Spanish tennis player

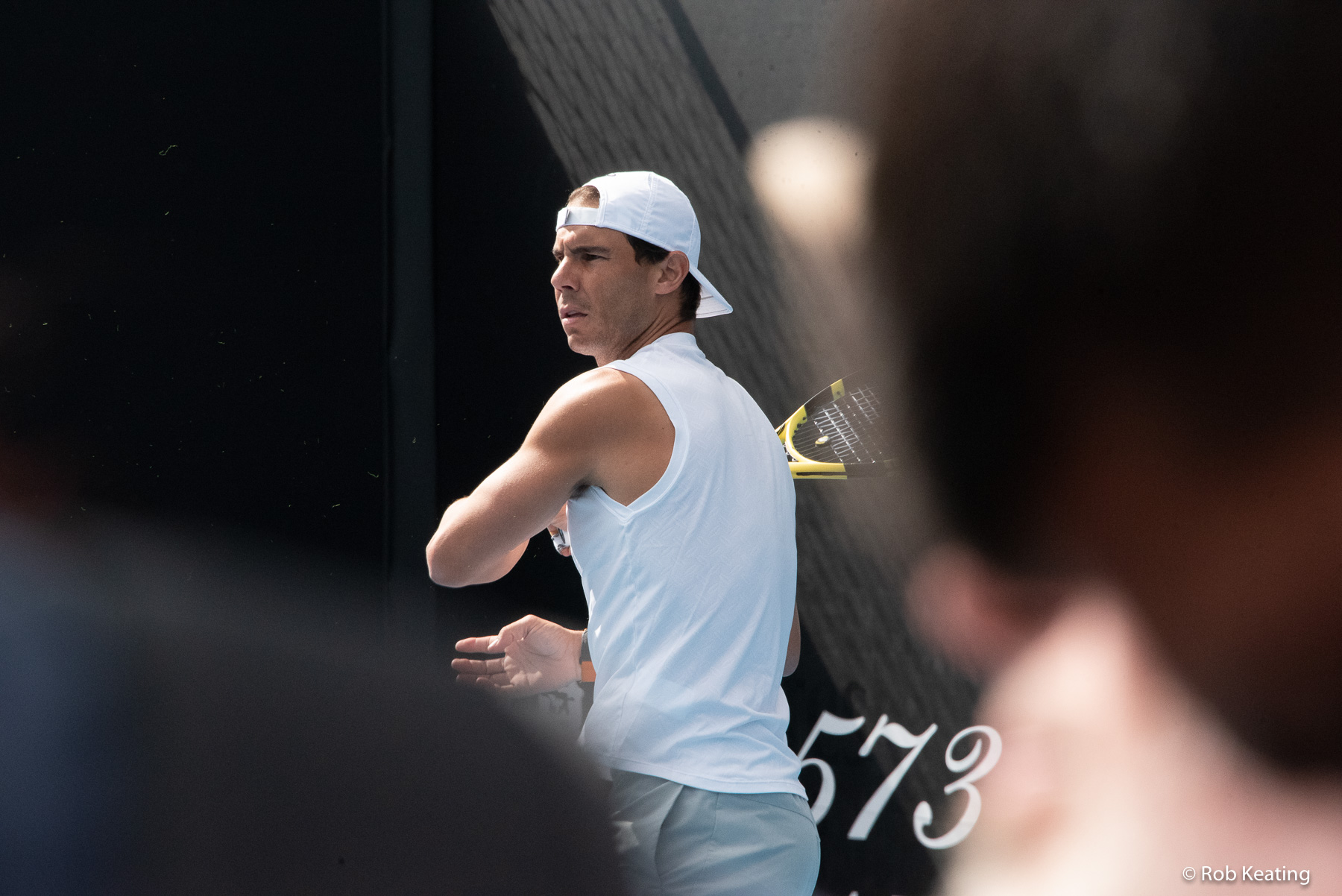
- Full name: Rafael Nadal Parera
- Country: Spain
- Calendar prize money: $3,881,202 (singles & doubles)

Singles
- Season record: 27–7
- Calendar titles: 2
- Current ranking: No. 2
- Ranking change from previous year: ▼1

Grand Slam & significant results
- Australian Open: QF
- French Open: W
- Wimbledon: Not held due to COVID-19 pandemic
- US Open: A

Doubles
- Season record: 2–0
- Current ranking: No. 475

The 2020 Rafael Nadal tennis season officially began on 3 January 2020, in the first round at the inaugural 2020 ATP Cup Group B venues in Perth.

== Yearly summary ==
=== Early hard court season ===
==== ATP Cup ====
Nadal started his season at the inaugural ATP Cup as part of the Spanish squad. Nadal will be playing in singles along with compatriot Roberto Bautista Agut, while the doubles team will consist of Feliciano López and Pablo Carreño Busta. Spain was placed in Group B and will play their round-robin matches against Japan, Uruguay, and Georgia in Perth.

In Nadal's round-robin singles matches, he defeated Nikoloz Basilashvili, Pablo Cuevas and Yoshihito Nishioka in straight sets. Nadal also played in the doubles match against Japan, along with Carreño Busta, and won the match in three sets. The Spanish team then moved on to Sydney to play in the QF. In the singles in QF, Nadal faced David Goffin, to whom he lost the match in straight sets. However, because compatriot Bautista Agut won his singles match, and Nadal and Carreño Busta won in the doubles, Spain moved on to the SF against Australia. There, Nadal defeated Alex de Minaur in the singles in 3 sets, and combined with Bautista Agut's defeat of Nick Kyrgios in straight sets earlier, moved Spain to the ATP Cup Final. In the final, they played against Serbia, with Nadal's singles match against World No. 2 Novak Djokovic. Nadal lost the match in straight sets to Djokovic, and with Spain's loss in doubles, Team Serbia won the ATP Cup.

==== Australian Open ====
Nadal's second tournament of the season will be the 2020 Australian Open. He won his first two matches against Hugo Dellien and Federico Delbonis in straight sets. He defeated compatriot and the 27th seed Pablo Carreño Busta in the 3rd round, again in straight sets. He defeated Nick Kyrgios in 4 sets the 4th round. However, he lost to World No. 5 Dominic Thiem in 4 sets at the QF.

==== Mexican Open ====
Nadal's first tournament following the Australian Open was the Mexican Open. He defeated Pablo Andujar, Miomir Kecmanović, and Kwon Soon-woo, all in straight sets to set up a semi-final encounter with Grigor Dimitrov. He was able to defeat Dimitrov easily in straight sets to reach his first final in Acapulco since 2017, and his first final for the 2020 season. He defeated Taylor Fritz in the final in straight sets, to win his third title in Acapulco and his first title in 2020.

=== Season hiatus ===
On March 8, due to the COVID-19 pandemic, the season went on indefinite hiatus. The following measures were taken:

- The ATP and WTA announced the suspension of their 2020 tournaments until July 13. On March 18, the ATP froze their player rankings.
- On March 17, the French Tennis Federation announced the decision of postponing the French Open, to be held now from September 20 to October 4, 2020.
- On March 24, after talks between Japan's prime minister and the International Olympic Committee president, the 2020 Summer Olympics were officially postponed to 2021. On March 30, the various organising entities reached an agreement to hold the Olympics between July 23 and August 8, 2021.
- On April 1, the All England Club announced the decision of cancelling Wimbledon, opting to focus on the 2021 edition of the tournament.

=== Clay Court Season ===
Nadal opted to skip the Western and Southern Open and the US Open to prepare for the clay court season.

==== Italian Open ====
Nadal's first match back was against fellow Spaniard Pablo Carreno Busta, which he won 6–1, 6–1. In the next round, he played Serb Dušan Lajović, whom he defeated 6–1, 6–3. In the QF, he lost to Diego Schwartzman 2–6, 5–7.

==== French Open ====
Nadal won his 13th Roland Garros title, beating Novak Djokovic in straight sets in the tournament's final, only losing seven games. In doing so, he won his 20th Grand Slam title, equalling Roger Federer's record as the man with the most number of Grand Slam titles. It also marked his 100th win at the tournament, losing only twice in 16 years. His straight-sets victory over Djokovic marked also the 4th time that he won a Grand Slam without losing a set, all at the French Open doing it also in 2008, 2010 and 2017. Nadal also became the first player to defeat Djokovic in a completed match all year, Djokovic being 37–1 on the season prior to the loss to Nadal, with his only loss being the us open default.

=== European indoor hard court season ===
==== Paris Masters ====
Nadal lost to Alexander Zverev in the semifinals.

==== Nitto ATP Finals ====
Nadal defeated Andrey Rublev in his first round robin match. Two days later he lost to Dominic Thiem in two incredibly tight sets. He qualified for the semifinals with a three set win over Stefanos Tsitsipas. In the semis he faced Daniil Medvedev, and despite serving for a straight sets win, he lost in three sets, ending his bid to win his first ever title at the season ending event.

== All matches ==
This table chronicles all the matches of Rafael Nadal in 2020.

Key
W	F	SF	QF	#R	RR	Q#	P#	DNQ	A	Z#	PO	G	S	B	NMS	NTI	P	NH

(W) winner; (F) finalist; (SF) semifinalist; (QF) quarterfinalist; (#R) rounds 4, 3, 2, 1; (RR) round-robin stage; (Q#) qualification round; (P#) preliminary round; (DNQ) did not qualify; (A) absent; (Z#) Davis/Fed Cup Zonal Group (with number indication) or (PO) play-off; (G) gold, (S) silver or (B) bronze Olympic/Paralympic medal; (NMS) not a Masters tournament; (NTI) not a Tier I tournament; (P) postponed; (NH) not held; (SR) strike rate (events won / competed); (W–L) win–loss record.
To avoid confusion and double counting, these charts are updated at the conclusion of a tournament or when the player's participation has ended.

=== Singles matches ===
Tournament	Match	Round	Opponent (seed or key)	Rank	Result	Score
ATP Cup; Perth, Group B Sydney, Knockout stage Australia; Laver Cup; Hard, outdoor 3–12 January 2020
ATP Cup; Perth, Group B Sydney, Knockout stage Australia; Laver Cup; Hard, outdoor 3–12 January 2020	1 / 1175	RR	(Georgia (country)) Nikoloz Basilashvili	26	Win	6–3, 7–5
ATP Cup; Perth, Group B Sydney, Knockout stage Australia; Laver Cup; Hard, outdoor 3–12 January 2020	2 / 1176	RR	(Uruguay) Pablo Cuevas	45	Win	6–2, 6–1
ATP Cup; Perth, Group B Sydney, Knockout stage Australia; Laver Cup; Hard, outdoor 3–12 January 2020	3 / 1177	RR	(Japan) Yoshihito Nishioka	72	Win	7–6^{(7–4)}, 6–4
ATP Cup; Perth, Group B Sydney, Knockout stage Australia; Laver Cup; Hard, outdoor 3–12 January 2020	4 / 1178	QF	(Belgium) David Goffin	11	Loss	4–6, 6–7^{(3–7)}
ATP Cup; Perth, Group B Sydney, Knockout stage Australia; Laver Cup; Hard, outdoor 3–12 January 2020	5 / 1179	SF	(Australia) Alex de Minaur	18	Win	4–6, 7–5, 6–1
ATP Cup; Perth, Group B Sydney, Knockout stage Australia; Laver Cup; Hard, outdoor 3–12 January 2020	6 / 1180	F	(Serbia) Novak Djokovic	2	Loss	2–6, 6–7^{(4–7)}
Australian Open; Melbourne, Australia; Grand Slam tournament Hard, outdoor 20 January – 2 February 2020
Australian Open; Melbourne, Australia; Grand Slam tournament Hard, outdoor 20 January – 2 February 2020	7 / 1181	1R	(Bolivia) Hugo Dellien	73	Win	6–2, 6–3, 6–0
Australian Open; Melbourne, Australia; Grand Slam tournament Hard, outdoor 20 January – 2 February 2020	8 / 1182	2R	(Argentina) Federico Delbonis	76	Win	6–3, 7–6^{(7–4)}, 6–1
Australian Open; Melbourne, Australia; Grand Slam tournament Hard, outdoor 20 January – 2 February 2020	9 / 1183	3R	(Spain) Pablo Carreño Busta (27)	30	Win	6–1, 6–2, 6–4
Australian Open; Melbourne, Australia; Grand Slam tournament Hard, outdoor 20 January – 2 February 2020	10 / 1184	4R	(Australia) Nick Kyrgios (23)	26	Win	6–3, 3–6, 7–6^{(8–6)}, 7–6^{(7–4)}
Australian Open; Melbourne, Australia; Grand Slam tournament Hard, outdoor 20 January – 2 February 2020	11 / 1185	QF	(Austria) Dominic Thiem (5)	5	Loss	6–7^{(3–7)}, 6–7^{(4–7)}, 6–4, 6–7^{(6–8)}
Mexican Open; Acapulco, Mexico; ATP 500; Hard, outdoor 24–29 February 2020
Mexican Open; Acapulco, Mexico; ATP 500; Hard, outdoor 24–29 February 2020	12 / 1186	1R	(Spain) Pablo Andújar	54	Win	6–3, 6–2
Mexican Open; Acapulco, Mexico; ATP 500; Hard, outdoor 24–29 February 2020	13 / 1187	2R	(Serbia) Miomir Kecmanović	50	Win	6–2, 7–5
Mexican Open; Acapulco, Mexico; ATP 500; Hard, outdoor 24–29 February 2020	14 / 1188	QF	(South Korea) Kwon Soon-woo	76	Win	6–2, 6–1
Mexican Open; Acapulco, Mexico; ATP 500; Hard, outdoor 24–29 February 2020	15 / 1189	SF	(Bulgaria) Grigor Dimitrov (7)	22	Win	6–3, 6–2
Mexican Open; Acapulco, Mexico; ATP 500; Hard, outdoor 24–29 February 2020	16 / 1190	W	(United States) Taylor Fritz	35	Win (1)	6–3, 6–2
Italian Open; Rome, Italy; ATP 1000; Clay, outdoor 14 – 21 September 2020
Italian Open; Rome, Italy; ATP 1000; Clay, outdoor 14 – 21 September 2020	–	1R	Bye			
Italian Open; Rome, Italy; ATP 1000; Clay, outdoor 14 – 21 September 2020	17 / 1191	2R	(Spain) Pablo Carreño Busta	18	Win	6–1, 6–1
Italian Open; Rome, Italy; ATP 1000; Clay, outdoor 14 – 21 September 2020	18 / 1192	3R	(Serbia) Dušan Lajović	25	Win	6–1, 6–3
Italian Open; Rome, Italy; ATP 1000; Clay, outdoor 14 – 21 September 2020	19 / 1193	QF	(Argentina) Diego Schwartzman (8)	15	Loss	2–6, 5–7
French Open; Paris, France; Grand Slam tournament Clay, outdoor 27 September – 11 October 2020
French Open; Paris, France; Grand Slam tournament Clay, outdoor 27 September – 11 October 2020	20 / 1194	1R	(Belarus) Egor Gerasimov	83	Win	6–4, 6–4, 6–2
French Open; Paris, France; Grand Slam tournament Clay, outdoor 27 September – 11 October 2020	21 / 1195	2R	(United States) Mackenzie McDonald (PR)	236	Win	6–1, 6–0, 6–3
French Open; Paris, France; Grand Slam tournament Clay, outdoor 27 September – 11 October 2020	22 / 1196	3R	(Italy) Stefano Travaglia	74	Win	6–1, 6–4, 6–0
French Open; Paris, France; Grand Slam tournament Clay, outdoor 27 September – 11 October 2020	23 / 1197	4R	(United States) Sebastian Korda (Q)	213	Win	6–1, 6–1, 6–2
French Open; Paris, France; Grand Slam tournament Clay, outdoor 27 September – 11 October 2020	24 / 1198	QF	(Italy) Jannik Sinner	75	Win	7–6^{(7–4)}, 6–4, 6–1
French Open; Paris, France; Grand Slam tournament Clay, outdoor 27 September – 11 October 2020	25 / 1199	SF	(Argentina) Diego Schwartzman (12)	14	Win	6–3, 6–3, 7–6^{(7–0)}
French Open; Paris, France; Grand Slam tournament Clay, outdoor 27 September – 11 October 2020	26 / 1200	W	(Serbia) Novak Djokovic (1)	1	Win (2)	6–0, 6–2, 7–5
Paris Masters; Paris, France; ATP 1000; Hard, indoor 2 – 8 November 2020
Paris Masters; Paris, France; ATP 1000; Hard, indoor 2 – 8 November 2020	–	1R	Bye			
Paris Masters; Paris, France; ATP 1000; Hard, indoor 2 – 8 November 2020	27 / 1201	2R	(Spain) Feliciano López	64	Win	4–6, 7–6^{(7–5)}, 6–4
Paris Masters; Paris, France; ATP 1000; Hard, indoor 2 – 8 November 2020	28 / 1202	3R	(Australia) Jordan Thompson	61	Win	6–1, 7–6^{(7–3)}
Paris Masters; Paris, France; ATP 1000; Hard, indoor 2 – 8 November 2020	29 / 1203	QF	(Spain) Pablo Carreño Busta (9)	15	Win	4–6, 7–5, 6–1
Paris Masters; Paris, France; ATP 1000; Hard, indoor 2 – 8 November 2020	30 / 1204	SF	(Germany) Alexander Zverev (4)	7	Loss	4–6, 5–7
ATP Finals; London, United Kingdom; ATP Finals; Hard, indoor 16 – 23 November 2020
ATP Finals; London, United Kingdom; ATP Finals; Hard, indoor 16 – 23 November 2020	31 / 1205	RR	(Russia) Andrey Rublev (7)	8	Win	6–3, 6–4
ATP Finals; London, United Kingdom; ATP Finals; Hard, indoor 16 – 23 November 2020	32 / 1206	RR	(Austria) Dominic Thiem (3)	3	Loss	6–7^{(7–9)},6–7^{(4–7)}
ATP Finals; London, United Kingdom; ATP Finals; Hard, indoor 16 – 23 November 2020	33 / 1207	RR	(Greece) Stefanos Tsitsipas (6)	6	Win	6–4, 4–6, 6–2
ATP Finals; London, United Kingdom; ATP Finals; Hard, indoor 16 – 23 November 2020	34 / 1208	SF	(Russia) Daniil Medvedev (4)	4	Loss	6–3, 6–7^{(4–7)}, 3–6

=== Doubles matches ===
Tournament	Match	Round	Opponents (seed or key)	Ranks	Result	Score
ATP Cup; Perth, Group B Sydney, Knockout stage Australia; Laver Cup; Hard, outdoor 3–12 January 2020; Partner: (Spain) Pablo Carreño Busta
ATP Cup; Perth, Group B Sydney, Knockout stage Australia; Laver Cup; Hard, outdoor 3–12 January 2020; Partner: (Spain) Pablo Carreño Busta	1 / 210	RR	(Japan) Ben McLachlan / (Japan) Go Soeda	43 / NR	Win	7–6^{(7–5)}, 4–6, [10–6]
ATP Cup; Perth, Group B Sydney, Knockout stage Australia; Laver Cup; Hard, outdoor 3–12 January 2020; Partner: (Spain) Pablo Carreño Busta	2 / 211	QF	(Belgium) Sander Gillé / (Belgium) Joran Vliegen	47 / 39	Win	6–7^{(7–9)}, 7–5, [10–7]

== Exhibition matches ==
=== Singles ===
Tournament	Match	Round	Opponent (seed or key)	Rank	Result	Score
2019 World Tennis Championship; Abu Dhabi, United Arab Emirates; Exhibition; Hard, outdoor 19 – 21 December 2019
2019 World Tennis Championship; Abu Dhabi, United Arab Emirates; Exhibition; Hard, outdoor 19 – 21 December 2019	–	QF	Bye			
2019 World Tennis Championship; Abu Dhabi, United Arab Emirates; Exhibition; Hard, outdoor 19 – 21 December 2019	1	SF	(Russia) Karen Khachanov (4)	17	Win	6–1, 6–3
2019 World Tennis Championship; Abu Dhabi, United Arab Emirates; Exhibition; Hard, outdoor 19 – 21 December 2019	2	W	(Greece) Stefanos Tsitsipas (3)	6	Win	6–7^{(3–7)}, 7–5, 7–6^{(7–3)}
The Match in Africa 6 Cape Town, South Africa; Exhibition; Hard, outdoor 7 February 2020
The Match in Africa 6 Cape Town, South Africa; Exhibition; Hard, outdoor 7 February 2020	2	–	(Switzerland) Roger Federer	3	Loss	4–6, 6–3, 3–6
Atlanta Challenge; Atlanta, United States; Exhibition; Hard, indoor 2 March 2020
Atlanta Challenge; Atlanta, United States; Exhibition; Hard, indoor 2 March 2020	1	–	(Bulgaria) Grigor Dimitrov	19	Win	7–5, 6–3

=== Doubles ===
Tournament	Match	Round	Opponents (seed or key)	Ranks	Result	Score
The Match in Africa 6 Cape Town, South Africa; Exhibition; Hard, outdoor 7 February 2020; Partner: (South Africa) Trevor Noah
The Match in Africa 6 Cape Town, South Africa; Exhibition; Hard, outdoor 7 February 2020; Partner: (South Africa) Trevor Noah	1	–	(Switzerland) Roger Federer / (United States) Bill Gates	– / –	Loss	3–6

== Schedule ==
Per Rafael Nadal, the below was his 2020 schedule.

=== Singles schedule ===
Date	Tournament	Location	Tier	Surface	Prev. result	Prev. points	New points	Result
3 January 2020– 12 January 2020	ATP Cup	Perth & Sydney (AUS)	ATP Cup	Hard	N/A	N/A	250	Final (lost to Serbia, 1–2)
20 January 2020– 2 February 2020	Australian Open	Melbourne (AUS)	Grand Slam	Hard	F	1200	360	Quarterfinals (lost to (Austria) Dominic Thiem, 6–7^{(3–7)}, 6–7^{(4–7)}, 6–4, 6–7^{(6–8)})
24 February 2020– 29 February 2020	Mexican Open	Acapulco (MEX)	500 Series	Hard	R16	45	500	Champion (defeated (United States) Taylor Fritz, 6–3, 6–2)
9 March 2020– 22 March 2020	Indian Wells Masters	Indian Wells (USA)	Masters 1000	Hard	SF	360	360 (Note: Tournaments that were postponed or canceled due to the COVID-19 pandemic had their rankings adjusted - players can use the best result from 2019 or 2020 from the same Tour-level event. If a player’s 2019 result is better than his 2020 result, his 2020 result will not be included in his ranking breakdown. And for canceled tournaments player’s 2019 results will be included.)	Tournament cancelled due to the coronavirus pandemic.
13 April 2020– 19 April 2020	Monte-Carlo Masters	Monte Carlo (MON)	Masters 1000	Clay	SF	360	360	Tournament cancelled due to the coronavirus pandemic.
22 April 2020- 28 April 2020	Barcelona Open	Barcelona (ESP)	500 Series	Clay	SF	180	180	Tournament cancelled due to the coronavirus pandemic.
4 May 2020– 10 May 2020	Madrid Open	Madrid (ESP)	Masters 1000	Clay	SF	360	360	Tournament cancelled due to the coronavirus pandemic.
29 June 2020– 12 July 2020	Wimbledon	London (GBR)	Grand Slam	Grass	SF	720	720	Tournament cancelled due to the coronavirus pandemic.
27 July 2020– 2 August 2020	Summer Olympics	Tokyo (JPN)	Olympic Games	Hard	N/A	N/A	0	Tournament postponed to 2021 due to the coronavirus pandemic.
10 August 2020– 16 August 2020	Canadian Open	Montreal (CAN)	Masters 1000	Hard	W	1000	1000	Tournament cancelled due to the coronavirus pandemic.
31 August 2020– 6 September 2020	US Open	New York (USA)	Grand Slam	Hard	W	2000	2000	Chose not to participate amid COVID-19 concerns.
14 September 2020– 20 September 2020	Italian Open	Rome (ITA)	Masters 1000	Clay	W	1000	1000	Quarterfinals (lost to (Argentina) Diego Schwartzman, 2–6, 5–7)
28 September 2020– 11 October 2020	French Open	Paris (FRA)	Grand Slam	Clay	W	2000	2000	Champion (defeated (Serbia) Novak Djokovic, 6–0, 6–2, 7–5)
2 November 2020– 8 November 2020	Paris Masters	Paris (FRA)	Masters 1000	Hard (i)	SF	360	360	Semifinals (lost to (Germany) Alexander Zverev, 4–6, 5–7)
15 November 2020– 22 November 2020	ATP Finals	London (GBR)	Tour Finals	Hard (i)	RR	400	400	Semifinals (lost to (Russia) Daniil Medvedev, 6–3, 6–7^{(4–7)}, 3–6)
Total year-end points						9985	9450	▼ -495 difference

=== Doubles schedule ===
Date	Tournament	Location	Tier	Surface	Prev. result	Prev. points	New points	Result
3 January 2020– 12 January 2020	ATP Cup	Perth & Sydney (AUS)	ATP Cup	Hard	N/A	N/A	95	Final (lost to Serbia, 1–2)
9 March 2020– 22 March 2020	Indian Wells Masters	Indian Wells (USA)	Masters 1000	Hard	SF	360	N/A	Tournament cancelled due to the Coronavirus
Total year-end points						0	95	▲95 difference

== Yearly records ==
=== Head-to-head matchups ===
Rafael Nadal has a 27–6 ATP match win–loss record in the 2020 season. His record against players who were part of the ATP rankings Top Ten at the time of their meetings is 3–4. Bold indicates player was ranked top 10 at the time of at least one meeting. The following list is ordered by number of wins:

- (Spain) Pablo Carreño Busta 3–0
- (Spain) Pablo Andújar 1–0
- (Georgia (country)) Nikoloz Basilashvili 1–0
- (Uruguay) Pablo Cuevas 1–0
- (Argentina) Federico Delbonis 1–0
- (Bolivia) Hugo Dellien 1–0
- (Bulgaria) Grigor Dimitrov 1–0
- (United States) Taylor Fritz 1–0
- (Belarus) Egor Gerasimov 1–0
- (Serbia) Miomir Kecmanović 1–0
- (United States) Sebastian Korda 1–0
- (Australia) Nick Kyrgios 1–0
- (Serbia) Dušan Lajović 1–0
- (Spain) Feliciano López 1–0
- (United States) Mackenzie McDonald 1–0
- (Australia) Alex de Minaur 1–0
- (Japan) Yoshihito Nishioka 1–0
- (Russia) **Andrey Rublev 1–0**
- (Italy) Jannik Sinner 1–0
- (South Korea) Kwon Soon-woo 1–0
- (Australia) Jordan Thompson 1–0
- (Italy) Stefano Travaglia 1–0
- (Greece) **Stefanos Tsitsipas 1–0**
- (Serbia) **Novak Djokovic 1–1**
- (Argentina) Diego Schwartzman 1–1
- (Belgium) David Goffin 0–1
- (Germany) **Alexander Zverev 0–1**
- (Austria) **Dominic Thiem 0–2**

* Statistics correct as of 19 November 2020.

=== Finals ===
==== Singles: 2 (2 titles) ====
Category Grand Slam (1–0) ATP Finals (0–0) ATP Tour Masters 1000 (0–0) ATP Tour 500 (1–0) ATP Tour 250 (0–0)	Titles by surface Hard (1–0) Clay (1–0) Grass (0–0)	Titles by setting Outdoor (2–0) Indoor (0–0)

Result	W–L	Date	Tournament	Tier	Surface	Opponent	Score
Win	1–0	Feb 2020	Mexican Open, Mexico (3)	500 Series	Hard	(United States) Taylor Fritz	6–3, 6–2
Win	2–0	Oct 2020	French Open, France	Grand Slam	Clay	(Serbia) Novak Djokovic	6–0, 6–2, 7–5

==== Team competitions: (1 final) ====
Result	W–L	Date	Tournament	Tier	Surface	Partner(s)	Opponents	Score
Final	0–1	Jan 2020	ATP Cup, Australia	ATP Cup	Hard (i)	(Spain) Roberto Bautista Agut (Spain) Pablo Carreño Busta (Spain) Feliciano López (Spain) Albert Ramos Viñolas	(Serbia) Nikola Čačić (Serbia) Novak Djokovic (Serbia) Dušan Lajović (Serbia) Nikola Milojević (Serbia) Viktor Troicki	1–2

=== Earnings ===
- **Bold** font denotes tournament win

**Singles**
Event	Prize money	Year-to-date
ATP Cup	$595,650	$595,650
Australian Open	A$525,000	$956,483
**Mexican Open**	**$372,785**	$1,329,268
Italian Open	€75,000	$1,418,097
**French Open**	**€1,600,000**	$3,278,577
Paris Masters	€100,000	$3,397,127
ATP Finals	$459,000	$3,856,127
		$3,856,127
**Doubles**
Event	Prize money	Year-to-date
ATP Cup	$25,075	$25,075
		$25,075
**Total**
		**$3,881,202**

Figures in United States dollars (USD) unless noted.

- source：2020 Singles Activity
- source：2020 Doubles Activity

== Television ==
At the ATP Cup, Nadal's semifinals match versus Alex de Minaur averaged 320,000 viewers on Teledeporte, and his final match versus Novak Djokovic averaged 953,000 viewers on RTVE's La 1.

At the French Open, his semifinals match versus Diego Schwartzman averaged 403,000 viewers on DMAX and 232,000 viewers on Eurosport. His final match versus Djokovic averaged 1.5 million viewers on DMAX and 628,000 on Eurosport, combining for a 16.8% share.

At the ATP Finals, his semifinals match versus Daniil Medvedev averaged 274,000 vewiers on #Vamos.

== See also ==
- 2020 ATP Tour
- 2020 Novak Djokovic tennis season
- 2020 Dominic Thiem tennis season
