= 2020 Dominic Thiem tennis season =

- Full name: Dominic Thiem
- Country: Austria
- Calendar prize money: $6,030,756

Singles
- Season record: 25–9
- Calendar titles: 1
- Current ranking: No. 3
- Ranking change from previous year: ▲1

Grand Slam & significant results
- Australian Open: F
- French Open: QF
- Wimbledon: NH
- US Open: W

The 2020 Dominic Thiem tennis season saw the Austrian tennis player win 25 matches with 9 losses, earning over six million dollars in prize money, and recording his first Grand Slam title at the 2020 US Open. He began the season ranked fourth on the ATP Tour, and finished the season ranked third.

== Yearly summary ==
=== Early hard court season ===
==== ATP Cup ====
Thiem started his 2020 season at the ATP Cup as a part of the Austrian squad. He played alongside Dennis Novak, Sebastian Ofner, Jürgen Melzer, and his doubles partner Oliver Marach. Thomas Muster was captain. In his first match, Thiem lost to Borna Ćorić in three tight sets. Team Austria lost their match 0–3 against Team Croatia. Thiem won his second match over Argentine Diego Schwartzman in straight sets. Team Austria needed to defeat Team Poland to advance to the quarterfinals. Dennis Novak lost the first match, and Thiem needed a win against Hubert Hurkacz to keep their hopes alive. He lost the match in three sets, and Team Austria was eliminated.

==== Australian Open ====
Before the Australian Open began, Thiem participated in AO Rally for Relief, a fundraising exhibition to help victims of the bushfires in Australia. He was a part of Team Serena Williams alongside Petra Kvitova, Novak Djokovic, and Rafael Nadal. The fundraising effort brought in almost five million dollars.

Thiem was seeded fifth for the main draw. He beat Adrian Mannarino in the first round in three sets, and won his second round match over wildcard player Alex Bolt in five sets. In the third round he beat Taylor Fritz in four sets, and in round four defeated Gaël Monfils in three straight sets to reach his first Australian Open quarterfinal. In the quarterfinal, Thiem met the top seed and number one player in the world, Rafael Nadal, and won this match in four tight sets 7–6^{(7–3)}, 7–6^{(7–4)}, 4–6, 7–6^{(8–6)}. In the semifinals Thiem faced Alexander Zverev. After a poor start, Thiem recovered and won the match in four sets, reaching his third Grand Slam final. In the final he met seven-time Australian Open champion Novak Djokovic. After Thiem lost the opening set, he won sets two and three. Djokovic won the fourth set to send the match to a decisive fifth set. An early break for Djokovic and almost perfect serving games decided the match and Djokovic successfully defended his title, 6–4, 4–6, 2–6, 6–3, 6–4.

=== American Swing ===
==== Rio de Janeiro ====
Thiem's next tournament was on the clay court surfaces at the Rio Open. After a three set win over Felipe Meligeni Alves and a win over the Spaniard Jaume Munar, he lost in the quarterfinals to qualifier Gianluca Mager in straight sets. Thiem withdrew from the Mexican Open in Acapulco and prepared to defend his ATP Masters title in Indian Wells, California.

On 2 March, he was third overall in the ATP rankings.

=== Season hiatus ===
On March 8, due to the COVID-19 pandemic, the season went on hiatus for several months. The following measures were taken:

- The ATP and WTA announced the suspension of their 2020 tournaments until August 16. On March 18, the ATP froze their player rankings.
- On 17 March, the French Tennis Federation announced the decision to postpone the French Open, to be held now from 27 September to 11 October 2020.
- On 24 March after talks between Japan's prime minister and the International Olympic Committee president, the 2020 Summer Olympics were officially postponed to 2021. On 30 March the various organising entities reached an agreement to hold the Olympics between 23 July and 8 August 2021.
- On 1 April the All England Club announced the decision of cancelling Wimbledon, opting to focus on the 2021 edition of the tournament.

=== American outdoor hardcourt season ===
==== Cincinnati Masters ====
After being on hiatus for five months due to COVID-19, the ATP tour resumed play in August with the Cincinnati Masters, although this year it would be played in New York.

Thiem was seeded second in the draw and had a bye for the first round. He lost in the second round to Filip Krajinović, 6–2, 6–1.

==== US Open ====
Thiem entered the US Open as the second seed. In the first round, he faced Jaume Munar, who retired after two sets. In round two Thiem beat Sumit Nagal 6–3, 6–3, 6–2. 2014 US Open-winner Marin Čilić was Thiem's opponent in round three, and Thiem won in four sets, 6–2, 6–2, 3–6, 6–3. Thiem defeated Félix Auger-Aliassime in straight sets in the fourth round (7–6, 6–1, 6–1) and reached his second US Open quarterfinal. In the quarterfinals, he beat Alex de Minaur 6–1, 6–2, 6–4. In the semifinals he met 2019 US Open finalist, Daniil Medvedev. Thiem won the first set easily, and came from behind to win the second and third sets in tiebreakers. Thiem won the match to reach his fourth Grand Slam final, 6–2, 7–6^{(9–7)}, 7-6^{(7–5)}.

Thiem's opponent in the finals was Alex Zverev. Zverev took the first two sets 6–2, 6–4, and had the advantage after breaking Thiem's serve early in the third set. Thiem broke right back to even the set, and after five games of held serves Thiem broke Zverev again to take the set, 6–4. Thiem took the fourth set 6–3, leading to a decisive fifth set.

Thiem and Zverev traded breaks in the first two games of the fifth set before Zverev broke Thiem again and took a commanding 5–3 lead. Thiem broke Zverev to make it 5–4, held serve, and broke Zverev again to have a chance to serve for the match at 6–5. Thiem took a medical timeout for a thigh injury and was then broken by Zverev to go to 6-6. The ensuing tiebreak was the first in Open Era history in a US Open final. Thiem led the tiebreak 6–4 to get two Championship points. He took control in the tiebreak and on the third championship point, an errant Zverev backhand meant Thiem won the tiebreak, set, and match (2–6, 4–6, 6–4, 6–3, 7-6^{(8–6)}). The victory gave Thiem his first Grand Slam title, and he became the first man born in the 1990s to win a Grand Slam, as well as the first player since 2004 to come back from two sets behind to win a Grand Slam.

=== Roland Garros and late indoor season ===
==== French Open ====
Due to the COVID-19 pandemic, the French Open was rescheduled, moving from its usual start date in May to a late September start, just two weeks after the US Open. Thiem was seeded third, and in the first three rounds he defeated Marin Čilić, Jack Sock and Casper Ruud, all in straight sets. In the round of 16 he beat French wildcard entry Hugo Gaston in five sets. By beating Gaston, Thiem earned his fifth straight trip to the Roland Garros quarterfinals. There he faced Diego Schwartzman, and lost after a five-hour battle with three tiebreaks in five sets, 6–7^{(1–7)}, 7–5, 7–6^{(8–6)}, 6–7^{(5–7)}, 2–6.

==== Vienna Open ====
A month after Roland Garros, Thiem was seeded second for a title defense at his home tournament, the Vienna Open. He won the opening round over Vitaliy Sachko, followed by a victory over Cristian Garín, both in straight sets. In the quarterfinals he was beaten by eventual-champion Andrey Rublev in two sets. After the match he withdrew from the Rolex Paris Masters, citing problems with foot blisters.

==== ATP finals ====
The 2020 ATP Finals were held in the O_{2} Arena in London from 15 to 22 November. The tournament features eight players, split into two groups of four for round-robin play, followed by knockout play amongst the top four. Thiem was drawn to a group with Nadal, Stefanos Tsitsipas and Rublev. Thiem beat defending champion Tsitsipas in three tight sets, 7-6^{(7–5)}, 4–6, 6–3. In the second match he beat Rafael Nadal in two tiebreakers, 7-6^{(9–7)}, 7-6^{(6–4)}. Thiem lost his final robin-round match to Rublev in straight sets, but qualified to advance to the knockout rounds. In the semifinals he faced Djokovic. He won the opening set 7-5 and had a match point in the second set, but lost the set in a tiebreak. In the final set he was down 0–4 in a tiebreak, but came back and won the final tiebreak, 7–5. This was Thiem's second straight appearance in the ATP Finals championship, having lost to Tsitsipas in the finals in 2019. This year he faced Daniil Medvedev. Thiem took the first set, but dropped the next two, ending the tournament as runner-up and closing out the 2020 season.

== All matches ==
This table lists all the matches of Thiem in 2020, including walkovers (W/O).

Key
| W | F | SF | QF | #R | RR | Q# | P# | DNQ | A | Z# | PO | G | S | B | NMS | NTI | P | NH |

(W) winner; (F) finalist; (SF) semifinalist; (QF) quarterfinalist; (#R) rounds 4, 3, 2, 1; (RR) round-robin stage; (Q#) qualification round; (P#) preliminary round; (DNQ) did not qualify; (A) absent; (Z#) Davis/Fed Cup Zonal Group (with number indication) or (PO) play-off; (G) gold, (S) silver or (B) bronze Olympic/Paralympic medal; (NMS) not a Masters tournament; (NTI) not a Tier I tournament; (P) postponed; (NH) not held; (SR) strike rate (events won / competed); (W–L) win–loss record.
To avoid confusion and double counting, these charts are updated at the conclusion of a tournament or when the player's participation has ended.

=== Singles matches ===
| Tournament | Match | Round | Opponent (seed or key) | Rank | Result | Score |
|---|---|---|---|---|---|---|
ATP Cup; Sydney, Group E Australia; Laver Cup; Hard, outdoor 3–12 January 2020
| ATP Cup; Sydney, Group E Australia; Laver Cup; Hard, outdoor 3–12 January 2020 | 1 / 422 | RR | (Croatia) Borna Ćorić | 28 | Loss | 6–7^{(4–7)}, 6–2, 3–6 |
| ATP Cup; Sydney, Group E Australia; Laver Cup; Hard, outdoor 3–12 January 2020 | 2 / 423 | RR | (Argentina) Diego Schwartzman | 14 | Win | 6–3, 7–6^{(7–3)} |
| ATP Cup; Sydney, Group E Australia; Laver Cup; Hard, outdoor 3–12 January 2020 | 3 / 424 | RR | (Poland) Hubert Hurkacz | 37 | Loss | 6–3, 4–6, 6–7^{(5–7)} |
Australian Open; Melbourne, Australia; Grand Slam tournament Hard, outdoor 20 January – 2 February 2020
| Australian Open; Melbourne, Australia; Grand Slam tournament Hard, outdoor 20 January – 2 February 2020 | 4 / 425 | 1R | (France) Adrian Mannarino | 44 | Win | 6–3, 7–5, 6–2 |
| Australian Open; Melbourne, Australia; Grand Slam tournament Hard, outdoor 20 January – 2 February 2020 | 5 / 426 | 2R | (Australia) Alex Bolt (WC) | 140 | Win | 6–2, 5–7, 6–7^{(5–7)}, 6–1, 6–2 |
| Australian Open; Melbourne, Australia; Grand Slam tournament Hard, outdoor 20 January – 2 February 2020 | 6 / 427 | 3R | (United States) Taylor Fritz (29) | 34 | Win | 6–2, 6–4, 6–7^{(5–7)}, 6–4 |
| Australian Open; Melbourne, Australia; Grand Slam tournament Hard, outdoor 20 January – 2 February 2020 | 7 / 428 | 4R | (France) Gaël Monfils (10) | 10 | Win | 6–2, 6–4, 6–4 |
| Australian Open; Melbourne, Australia; Grand Slam tournament Hard, outdoor 20 January – 2 February 2020 | 8 / 429 | QF | (Spain) Rafael Nadal (1) | 1 | Win | 7–6^{(7–3)}, 7–6^{(7–4)}, 4–6, 7–6^{(8–6)} |
| Australian Open; Melbourne, Australia; Grand Slam tournament Hard, outdoor 20 January – 2 February 2020 | 9 / 430 | SF | (Germany) Alexander Zverev (5) | 5 | Win | 3–6, 6–4, 7–6^{(7–3)}, 7–6^{(7–4)} |
| Australian Open; Melbourne, Australia; Grand Slam tournament Hard, outdoor 20 January – 2 February 2020 | 10 / 431 | F | (Serbia) Novak Djokovic (2) | 2 | Loss | 4–6, 6–4, 6–2, 3–6, 4–6 |
Rio Open; Rio de Janeiro, Brazil; ATP 500; Clay, outdoor 17–23 February 2020
| Rio Open; Rio de Janeiro, Brazil; ATP 500; Clay, outdoor 17–23 February 2020 | 11 / 432 | 1R | (Brazil) Felipe Meligeni Alves | 318 | Win | 6–2, 3–6, 6–1 |
| Rio Open; Rio de Janeiro, Brazil; ATP 500; Clay, outdoor 17–23 February 2020 | 12 / 433 | 2R | (Spain) Jaume Munar | 99 | Win | 6–7^{(5–7)}, 6–3, 6–4 |
| Rio Open; Rio de Janeiro, Brazil; ATP 500; Clay, outdoor 17–23 February 2020 | 13 / 434 | QF | (Italy) Gianluca Mager (Q) | 128 | Loss | 6–7^{(4–7)}, 5–7 |
Cincinnati Masters; New York City, United States; ATP 1000; Hard, outdoor 22–28 August 2020
| Cincinnati Masters; New York City, United States; ATP 1000; Hard, outdoor 22–28 August 2020 | – | 1R | Bye | | | |
| Cincinnati Masters; New York City, United States; ATP 1000; Hard, outdoor 22–28 August 2020 | 14 / 435 | 2R | (Serbia) Filip Krajinović | 32 | Loss | 2–6, 1–6 |
US Open; New York City, United States; Grand Slam tournament Hard, outdoor 31 August – 13 September 2020
| US Open; New York City, United States; Grand Slam tournament Hard, outdoor 31 August – 13 September 2020 | 15 / 436 | 1R | (Spain) Jaume Munar | 105 | Win | 7–6^{(8–6)}, 6–3, 0–0 ret. |
| US Open; New York City, United States; Grand Slam tournament Hard, outdoor 31 August – 13 September 2020 | 16 / 437 | 2R | (India) Sumit Nagal | 124 | Win | 6–3, 6–3, 6–2 |
| US Open; New York City, United States; Grand Slam tournament Hard, outdoor 31 August – 13 September 2020 | 17 / 438 | 3R | (Croatia) Marin Čilić (31) | 38 | Win | 6–2, 6–2, 3–6, 6–3 |
| US Open; New York City, United States; Grand Slam tournament Hard, outdoor 31 August – 13 September 2020 | 18 / 439 | 4R | (Canada) Félix Auger-Aliassime (15) | 21 | Win | 7–6^{(7–4)}, 6–1, 6–1 |
| US Open; New York City, United States; Grand Slam tournament Hard, outdoor 31 August – 13 September 2020 | 19 / 440 | QF | (Australia) Alex de Minaur (21) | 28 | Win | 6–1, 6–2, 6–4 |
| US Open; New York City, United States; Grand Slam tournament Hard, outdoor 31 August – 13 September 2020 | 20 / 441 | SF | (Russia) Daniil Medvedev (3) | 5 | Win | 6–2, 7–6^{(9–7)}, 7–6^{(7–5)} |
| US Open; New York City, United States; Grand Slam tournament Hard, outdoor 31 August – 13 September 2020 | 21 / 442 | W | (Germany) Alexander Zverev (5) | 7 | Win (1) | 2–6, 4–6, 6–4, 6–3, 7–6^{(8–6)} |
French Open; Paris, France; Grand Slam tournament Clay, outdoor 27 September – 11 October 2020
| French Open; Paris, France; Grand Slam tournament Clay, outdoor 27 September – 11 October 2020 | 22 / 443 | 1R | (Croatia) Marin Čilić | 40 | Win | 6–4, 6–3, 6–3 |
| French Open; Paris, France; Grand Slam tournament Clay, outdoor 27 September – 11 October 2020 | 23 / 444 | 2R | (United States) Jack Sock (Q) | 310 | Win | 6–1, 6–3, 7–6^{(8–6)} |
| French Open; Paris, France; Grand Slam tournament Clay, outdoor 27 September – 11 October 2020 | 24 / 445 | 3R | (Norway) Casper Ruud (28) | 25 | Win | 6–4, 6–3, 6–1 |
| French Open; Paris, France; Grand Slam tournament Clay, outdoor 27 September – 11 October 2020 | 25 / 446 | 4R | (France) Hugo Gaston (WC) | 239 | Win | 6–4, 6–4, 5–7, 3–6, 6–3 |
| French Open; Paris, France; Grand Slam tournament Clay, outdoor 27 September – 11 October 2020 | 26 / 447 | QF | (Argentina) Diego Schwartzman (12) | 14 | Loss | 6–7^{(1–7)}, 7–5, 7–6^{(8–6)}, 6–7^{(5–7)}, 2–6 |
Vienna Open; Vienna, Austria; ATP 500; Hard, indoor 26 October – 1 November 2020
| Vienna Open; Vienna, Austria; ATP 500; Hard, indoor 26 October – 1 November 2020 | 27 / 448 | 1R | (Ukraine) Vitaliy Sachko (LL) | 529 | Win | 6–4, 7–5 |
| Vienna Open; Vienna, Austria; ATP 500; Hard, indoor 26 October – 1 November 2020 | 28 / 449 | 2R | (Chile) Cristian Garín | 22 | Win | 6–3, 6–2 |
| Vienna Open; Vienna, Austria; ATP 500; Hard, indoor 26 October – 1 November 2020 | 29 / 450 | QF | (Russia) Andrey Rublev (5) | 8 | Loss | 6–7^{(5–7)}, 2–6 |
ATP Finals; London, United Kingdom; ATP Finals; Hard, indoor 16–22 November 2020
| ATP Finals; London, United Kingdom; ATP Finals; Hard, indoor 16–22 November 2020 | 30 / 451 | RR | (Greece) Stefanos Tsitsipas (6) | 6 | Win | 7–6^{(7–5)}, 4–6, 6–3 |
| ATP Finals; London, United Kingdom; ATP Finals; Hard, indoor 16–22 November 2020 | 31 / 452 | RR | (Spain) Rafael Nadal (2) | 2 | Win | 7–6^{(9–7)}, 7–6^{(7–4)} |
| ATP Finals; London, United Kingdom; ATP Finals; Hard, indoor 16–22 November 2020 | 32 / 453 | RR | (Russia) Andrey Rublev (7) | 8 | Loss | 2–6, 5–7 |
| ATP Finals; London, United Kingdom; ATP Finals; Hard, indoor 16–22 November 2020 | 33 / 454 | SF | (Serbia) Novak Djokovic (1) | 1 | Win | 7–5, 6–7^{(10–12)}, 7–6^{(7–5)} |
| ATP Finals; London, United Kingdom; ATP Finals; Hard, indoor 16–22 November 2020 | 34 / 455 | F | (Russia) Daniil Medvedev (4) | 5 | Loss | 6–4, 6–7^{(2–7)}, 4–6 |

=== Doubles matches ===
| Tournament | Match | Round | Opponent (seed or key) | Rank | Result | Score |
|---|---|---|---|---|---|---|
Vienna Open; Vienna, Austria; ATP 500; Hard, indoor 26 October – 1 November 2020; Partner: (Austria) Dennis Novak
| Vienna Open; Vienna, Austria; ATP 500; Hard, indoor 26 October – 1 November 2020; Partner: (Austria) Dennis Novak | 1 / 110 | RR | (United Kingdom) Jamie Murray / (United Kingdom) Neal Skupski | NR / NR | Loss | 5–7, 7–6^{(7–1)}, [5–10] |

== Yearly records ==
=== Finals ===
==== Singles: 3 (1 title) ====
| Category Grand Slam (1–1) ATP Finals (0–1) Masters 1000 (0–0) 500 Series (0–0) 250 Series (0–0) | Titles by surface Hard (1–2) Clay (0–0) Grass (0–0) | Titles by setting Outdoor (1–1) Indoor (0–1) |

| Result | W–L | Date | Tournament | Tier | Surface | Opponent | Score |
|---|---|---|---|---|---|---|---|
| Loss | 16–10 | Jan 2020 | Australian Open, Australia | Grand Slam | Hard | (Serbia) Novak Djokovic | 4–6, 6–4, 6–2, 3–6, 4–6 |
| Win | 17–10 | Sep 2020 | US Open, United States | Grand Slam | Hard | (Germany) Alexander Zverev | 2–6, 4–6, 6–4, 6–3, 7–6^{(8–6)} |
| Loss | 17–11 | Nov 2020 | ATP Finals, United Kingdom | Finals | Hard (i) | (Russia) Daniil Medvedev | 6–4, 6–7^{(2–7)}, 4–6 |

== See also ==
- 2020 ATP Tour
- 2020 Novak Djokovic tennis season
- 2020 Rafael Nadal tennis season
