= 2020 Novak Djokovic tennis season =

- Full name: Novak Djokovic
- Country: Serbia
- Calendar prize money: $6,511,233 (singles & doubles)

Singles
- Season record: 41–5
- Calendar titles: 4
- Year-end ranking: No. 1
- Ranking change from previous year: ▲1

Grand Slam & significant results
- Australian Open: W
- French Open: F
- Wimbledon: Not held
- US Open: 4R
- Other tournaments
- Tour Finals: SF

Doubles
- Season record: 2–1
- Current ranking: No. 158
- Ranking change from previous year: ▼19

Novak Djokovic began the 2020 tennis season on 3 January 2020, in the first round at the inaugural 2020 ATP Cup venues in Brisbane.

Djokovic ended the season with semifinal loss at the ATP Finals in London.

During this season, Djokovic:

- Surpassed Rafael Nadal's record of 35 Masters 1000 titles to 36.

== Yearly summary ==
=== Early hard court season ===
==== ATP Cup ====
At the 2020 ATP Cup, Djokovic defeated Kevin Anderson in three tight sets, as Team Serbia thrashed Team South Africa 3–0. Djokovic then won his singles match against Gaël Monfils in straight sets. He also won in three sets, in doubles with Viktor Troicki, winning the tiebreak set and saving Team Serbia. Serbia defeated Team France 2–1. Djokovic easily beat Cristian Garín in straight sets as Team Serbia beat Team Chile 3–0, and in the quarterfinals, Novak beat Denis Shapovalov in three sets, while Team Serbia thrashed Team Canada 3–0. Even in the semifinals, Djokovic beat Daniil Medvedev in three sets, while Team Serbia defeated Team Russia 3–0. In the final, Djokovic saved Team Serbia against Team Spain. He beat Rafael Nadal in straight sets, and partnered Viktor Troicki to win doubles in straight sets. Thus, Team Serbia won 2-1 and with that, won the inaugural ATP Cup title.

==== Australian Open ====
Before the actual tournament, Djokovic participated in a charity event called "Rally For Relief", to extend help for Australians suffering in the Australian Bushfires. He played for Team Williams as they defeated Team Wozniacki, 4–1. In the actual tournament, Djokovic started his title defence with a four-set win over Jan-Lennard Struff in the first round. He then defeated Tatusma Ito, Yoshihito Nishioka, Diego Schwartzman, Milos Raonic and Roger Federer, all in straight sets, to reach the final of the Australian Open. Despite being down two sets to one, Djokovic came back and won the next two sets, to defeat Dominic Thiem in the final, and win a record-extending eighth title in Melbourne. He became World No. 1 again, and stayed as World No. 1 for all weeks, except one week, until June 2022.

==== Dubai ====
Djokovic won for the fifth time in Dubai. He won in straight sets against Malek Jaziri, Philipp Kohlschreiber and Karen Khachanov. He saved three match points in his semifinal against Gaël Monfils and went on to win in 3 sets. He then defeated Stefanos Tsitsipas, the second seed, in straight sets, in the final.

He extended his winning streak to 21 matches.

=== Season hiatus ===
On March 8, due to the COVID-19 pandemic, the season went on hiatus for several months. The following measures were taken:

- The ATP and WTA announced the suspension of their 2020 tournaments until August 16. On March 18, the ATP froze their player rankings.
- On March 17, the French Tennis Federation announced the decision of postponing the French Open, to be held now from September 27 to October 11, 2020.
- On March 24, after talks between Japan's prime minister and the International Olympic Committee president, the 2020 Summer Olympics were officially postponed to 2021. On March 30, the various organising entities reached an agreement to hold the Olympics between July 23 and August 8, 2021.
- On April 1, the All England Club announced the decision of cancelling Wimbledon, opting to focus on the 2021 edition of the tournament.
- In June, Djokovic hosted a special charity tennis tournament called Adria Tour, across his home nation Serbia and it's neighbouring countries, Croatia, Montenegro and Bosnia, since those countries had little to no cases of COVID. He planned four tournaments and an exhibition match for the same. Dominic Thiem won the first leg of the Tour in Belgrade, and the final of the second leg was supposed to take place in Zadar, between Djokovic and Andrey Rublev, but it was cancelled after Tour participants Grigor Dimitrov and Borna Ćorić tested positive for the Coronavirus. Soon, even Djokovic tested positive, and the Tour had to be cancelled and scrapped. Djokovic landed in controversy for organizing this tour but was later cleared of all allegations against him.

=== American outdoor hardcourt season ===
==== Cincinnati Open ====
Djokovic started with straight sets wins over Ričardas Berankis, Tennys Sandgren and Jan-Lennard Struff. After a 3-set semifinal win over Roberto Bautista Agut, Djokovic won the title, defeating Milos Raonic in the final, 1–6, 6–3, 6–4. By doing so, he won his 35th Masters 1000 title, tying Rafael Nadal's record of most ATP Masters 1000 titles. Djokovic also achieved the Career Golden Masters for a second time and became the first player to win an ATP Tour singles title upon its resumption, after it was suspended due to the COVID-19 pandemic in March 2020.

==== US Open ====
In accordance with the Grand Slam rulebook, following his actions of intentionally hitting a ball dangerously or recklessly within the court or hitting a ball with negligent disregard of the consequences, the US Open tournament referee defaulted Novak Djokovic from the 2020 US Open. Because he was defaulted, Djokovic will lose all ranking points earned at the US Open and will be fined the prize money won at the tournament in addition to any or all fines levied with respect to the offending incident.

— US Open statement

Djokovic entered the US Open as the top seed. Djokovic beat Damir Džumhur in straight sets, Kyle Edmund in 4 sets, and Jan-Lennard Struff in straight sets to advance to the fourth round against 20th seed Pablo Carreño Busta. The fourth round match was uneventful until the tenth game, when Carreño Busta came back down 0–40 to hold serve; Djokovic had frustratedly hit a ball into an advertising board earlier when Carreño Busta tied it at deuce. At 5-5, Djokovic was injured and had to be treated on the court. When the match resumed, Carreño Busta took the game and a 6–5 lead in the first set, at which point Djokovic pulled out a spare ball from his pocket and again hit it behind him. The ball unintentionally struck a lineswoman in the throat, who fell to her knees and started hyperventilating. Djokovic was then defaulted from the tournament for recklessness, ending his US Open run. The US Open issued a statement regarding the default.

=== Clay court season ===
==== Italian Open ====
Djokovic defeated Salvatore Caruso and compatriot Filip Krajinović in straight sets. He defeated Dominik Koepfer in 3 sets in the quarterfinals, and he defeated Casper Ruud in the semifinals in straight sets. Djokovic won a record 36th ATP Tour Masters 1000 title and his fifth in Rome, by defeating Diego Schwartzman in the final 7–5, 6–3.

==== French Open ====
Djokovic attempted to become the first man in the Open Era to win each Grand Slam at least twice. He defeated Mikael Ymer, Berankis, Daniel Elahi Galán and Khachanov in straight sets. In the quarterfinals, Djokovic defeated Carreño Busta in 4 sets. He won a 5-set thriller against Tsitsipas in the semifinal. He lost in the final in straight sets to Nadal, 6–0 6–2 7–5, his first loss of the season.

=== European indoor hard court season ===
==== Vienna Open ====
In his first appearance at the Erste Bank Open since his 2007 title win, Novak Djokovic passed an early test to defeat countryman Filip Krajinović. He went 3–5 down in the first set and also conceded a set point in the tiebreaker beating him 7–6^{(8–6)}, 6–3 in straight sets. Djokovic faced four set points in his second-round clash against Borna Ćorić, but the top seed defeated the Croatian to reach the quarter-finals.

Djokovic then suffered his heaviest defeat ever in a three-set ATP Tour match, losing 6–2 6–1 to 42nd-ranked lucky loser Lorenzo Sonego in a strangely lacklustre quarter-final performance at the Erste Bank Open. It was only Djokovic's second loss of the year, and the first outside of a Grand Slam tournament. People close to him later revealed that he was in an incredibly bad mood after celebrated Serbian-Montenegrin bishop Amfilohije Radovic passed away few hours before the match.

==== ATP finals ====
In the ATP Finals, Djokovic lost to Daniil Medvedev in straight sets but defeated Alexander Zverev and Diego Schwartzman in straight sets to qualify for the semifinals. He then lost his semifinal match to Dominic Thiem in three sets, ending his season.

== All matches ==
This table lists all the matches of Djokovic this year, including walkovers (W/O)

Key
W	F	SF	QF	#R	RR	Q#	P#	DNQ	A	Z#	PO	G	S	B	NMS	NTI	P	NH

(W) winner; (F) finalist; (SF) semifinalist; (QF) quarterfinalist; (#R) rounds 4, 3, 2, 1; (RR) round-robin stage; (Q#) qualification round; (P#) preliminary round; (DNQ) did not qualify; (A) absent; (Z#) Davis/Fed Cup Zonal Group (with number indication) or (PO) play-off; (G) gold, (S) silver or (B) bronze Olympic/Paralympic medal; (NMS) not a Masters tournament; (NTI) not a Tier I tournament; (P) postponed; (NH) not held; (SR) strike rate (events won / competed); (W–L) win–loss record.
To avoid confusion and double counting, these charts are updated at the conclusion of a tournament or when the player's participation has ended.

=== Singles matches ===
Tournament	Match	Round	Opponent (seed or key)	Rank	Result	Score
2020 ATP Cup; Brisbane, Group A Sydney, Knockout stage Australia Hard, outdoor 3–12 January 2020
2020 ATP Cup; Brisbane, Group A Sydney, Knockout stage Australia Hard, outdoor 3–12 January 2020	1 / 1081	RR	(South Africa) Kevin Anderson	147	Win	7–6^{(7–5)}, 7–6^{(8–6)}
2020 ATP Cup; Brisbane, Group A Sydney, Knockout stage Australia Hard, outdoor 3–12 January 2020	2 / 1082	RR	(France) Gaël Monfils	9	Win	6–3, 6–2
2020 ATP Cup; Brisbane, Group A Sydney, Knockout stage Australia Hard, outdoor 3–12 January 2020	3 / 1083	RR	(Chile) Cristian Garín	33	Win	6–3, 6–3
2020 ATP Cup; Brisbane, Group A Sydney, Knockout stage Australia Hard, outdoor 3–12 January 2020	4 / 1084	QF	(Canada) Denis Shapovalov	14	Win	4–6, 6–1, 7–6^{(7–4)}
2020 ATP Cup; Brisbane, Group A Sydney, Knockout stage Australia Hard, outdoor 3–12 January 2020	5 / 1085	SF	(Russia) Daniil Medvedev	5	Win	6–1, 5–7, 6–4
2020 ATP Cup; Brisbane, Group A Sydney, Knockout stage Australia Hard, outdoor 3–12 January 2020	6 / 1086	W	(Spain) Rafael Nadal	1	Win (1)	6–2, 7–6^{(7–4)}
Australian Open; Melbourne, Australia; Grand Slam tournament Hard, outdoor 20 January – 2 February 2020
Australian Open; Melbourne, Australia; Grand Slam tournament Hard, outdoor 20 January – 2 February 2020	7 / 1087	1R	(Germany) Jan-Lennard Struff	37	Win	7–6^{(7–5)}, 6–2, 2–6, 6–1
Australian Open; Melbourne, Australia; Grand Slam tournament Hard, outdoor 20 January – 2 February 2020	8 / 1088	2R	(Japan) Tatsuma Ito (WC)	146	Win	6–1, 6–4, 6–2
Australian Open; Melbourne, Australia; Grand Slam tournament Hard, outdoor 20 January – 2 February 2020	9 / 1089	3R	(Japan) Yoshihito Nishioka	71	Win	6–3, 6–2, 6–2
Australian Open; Melbourne, Australia; Grand Slam tournament Hard, outdoor 20 January – 2 February 2020	10 / 1090	4R	(Argentina) Diego Schwartzman (14)	14	Win	6–3, 6–4, 6–4
Australian Open; Melbourne, Australia; Grand Slam tournament Hard, outdoor 20 January – 2 February 2020	11 / 1091	QF	(Canada) Milos Raonic (32)	35	Win	6–4, 6–3, 7–6^{(7–1)}
Australian Open; Melbourne, Australia; Grand Slam tournament Hard, outdoor 20 January – 2 February 2020	12 / 1092	SF	(Switzerland) Roger Federer (3)	3	Win	7–6^{(7–1)}, 6–4, 6–3
Australian Open; Melbourne, Australia; Grand Slam tournament Hard, outdoor 20 January – 2 February 2020	13 / 1093	W	(Austria) Dominic Thiem (5)	5	Win (2)	6–4, 4–6, 2–6, 6–3, 6–4
Dubai Open; Dubai, UAE; ATP 500; Hard, outdoor 24 February – 1 March 2020
Dubai Open; Dubai, UAE; ATP 500; Hard, outdoor 24 February – 1 March 2020	14 / 1094	1R	(Tunisia) Malek Jaziri (WC)	260	Win	6–1, 6–2
Dubai Open; Dubai, UAE; ATP 500; Hard, outdoor 24 February – 1 March 2020	15 / 1095	2R	(Germany) Philipp Kohlschreiber	80	Win	6–3, 6–1
Dubai Open; Dubai, UAE; ATP 500; Hard, outdoor 24 February – 1 March 2020	16 / 1096	QF	(Russia) Karen Khachanov (7)	17	Win	6–2, 6–2
Dubai Open; Dubai, UAE; ATP 500; Hard, outdoor 24 February – 1 March 2020	17 / 1097	SF	(France) Gaël Monfils (3)	9	Win	2–6, 7–6^{(10–8)}, 6–1
Dubai Open; Dubai, UAE; ATP 500; Hard, outdoor 24 February – 1 March 2020	18 / 1098	W	(Greece) Stefanos Tsitsipas (2)	6	Win (3)	6–3, 6–4
Cincinnati Masters; New York City, United States; ATP 1000; Hard, outdoor 22–28 August 2020
Cincinnati Masters; New York City, United States; ATP 1000; Hard, outdoor 22–28 August 2020	–	1R	Bye			
Cincinnati Masters; New York City, United States; ATP 1000; Hard, outdoor 22–28 August 2020	19 / 1099	2R	(Lithuania) Ričardas Berankis (Q)	72	Win	7–6^{(7–2)}, 6–4
Cincinnati Masters; New York City, United States; ATP 1000; Hard, outdoor 22–28 August 2020	20 / 1100	3R	(United States) Tennys Sandgren (WC)	55	Win	6–2, 6–4
Cincinnati Masters; New York City, United States; ATP 1000; Hard, outdoor 22–28 August 2020	21 / 1101	QF	(Germany) Jan-Lennard Struff	34	Win	6–3, 6–1
Cincinnati Masters; New York City, United States; ATP 1000; Hard, outdoor 22–28 August 2020	22 / 1102	SF	(Spain) Roberto Bautista Agut (8)	12	Win	4–6, 6–4, 7–6^{(7–0)}
Cincinnati Masters; New York City, United States; ATP 1000; Hard, outdoor 22–28 August 2020	23 / 1103	W	(Canada) Milos Raonic	30	Win (4)	1–6, 6–3, 6–4
US Open; New York City, United States; Grand Slam tournament Hard, outdoor 31 August – 13 September 2020
US Open; New York City, United States; Grand Slam tournament Hard, outdoor 31 August – 13 September 2020	24 / 1104	1R	(Bosnia and Herzegovina) Damir Džumhur	109	Win	6–1, 6–4, 6–1
US Open; New York City, United States; Grand Slam tournament Hard, outdoor 31 August – 13 September 2020	25 / 1105	2R	(United Kingdom) Kyle Edmund	44	Win	6–7^{(5–7)}, 6–3, 6–4, 6–2
US Open; New York City, United States; Grand Slam tournament Hard, outdoor 31 August – 13 September 2020	26 / 1106	3R	(Germany) Jan-Lennard Struff (28)	29	Win	6–3, 6–3, 6–1
US Open; New York City, United States; Grand Slam tournament Hard, outdoor 31 August – 13 September 2020	27 / 1107	4R	(Spain) Pablo Carreño Busta (20)	27	Default	5–6, defaulted
Italian Open; Rome, Italy; ATP 1000; Clay, outdoor 14–21 September 2020
Italian Open; Rome, Italy; ATP 1000; Clay, outdoor 14–21 September 2020	–	1R	Bye			
Italian Open; Rome, Italy; ATP 1000; Clay, outdoor 14–21 September 2020	28 / 1108	2R	(Italy) Salvatore Caruso (WC)	87	Win	6–3, 6–2
Italian Open; Rome, Italy; ATP 1000; Clay, outdoor 14–21 September 2020	29 / 1109	3R	(Serbia) Filip Krajinović	29	Win	7–6^{(9–7)}, 6–3
Italian Open; Rome, Italy; ATP 1000; Clay, outdoor 14–21 September 2020	30 / 1110	QF	(Germany) Dominik Koepfer (Q)	97	Win	6–3, 4–6, 6–3
Italian Open; Rome, Italy; ATP 1000; Clay, outdoor 14–21 September 2020	31 / 1111	SF	(Norway) Casper Ruud	34	Win	7–5, 6–3
Italian Open; Rome, Italy; ATP 1000; Clay, outdoor 14–21 September 2020	32 / 1112	W	(Argentina) Diego Schwartzman (8)	15	Win (5)	7–5, 6–3
French Open; Paris, France; Grand Slam tournament Clay, outdoor 27 September – 11 October 2020
French Open; Paris, France; Grand Slam tournament Clay, outdoor 27 September – 11 October 2020	33 / 1113	1R	(Sweden) Mikael Ymer	80	Win	6–0, 6–2, 6–3
French Open; Paris, France; Grand Slam tournament Clay, outdoor 27 September – 11 October 2020	34 / 1114	2R	(Lithuania) Ričardas Berankis	66	Win	6–1, 6–2, 6–2
French Open; Paris, France; Grand Slam tournament Clay, outdoor 27 September – 11 October 2020	35 / 1115	3R	(Colombia) Daniel Elahi Galán (LL)	153	Win	6–0, 6–3, 6–2
French Open; Paris, France; Grand Slam tournament Clay, outdoor 27 September – 11 October 2020	36 / 1116	4R	(Russia) Karen Khachanov (15)	16	Win	6–4, 6–3, 6–3
French Open; Paris, France; Grand Slam tournament Clay, outdoor 27 September – 11 October 2020	37 / 1117	QF	(Spain) Pablo Carreño Busta (17)	18	Win	4–6, 6–2, 6–3, 6–4
French Open; Paris, France; Grand Slam tournament Clay, outdoor 27 September – 11 October 2020	38 / 1118	SF	(Greece) Stefanos Tsitsipas (5)	6	Win	6–3, 6–2, 5–7, 4–6, 6–1
French Open; Paris, France; Grand Slam tournament Clay, outdoor 27 September – 11 October 2020	39 / 1119	F	(Spain) Rafael Nadal (2)	2	Loss	0–6, 2–6, 5–7
Vienna Open; Vienna, Austria; ATP 500; Hard, indoor 26 October – 1 November 2020
Vienna Open; Vienna, Austria; ATP 500; Hard, indoor 26 October – 1 November 2020	40 / 1120	1R	(Serbia) Filip Krajinović	30	Win	7–6^{(8–6)}, 6–3
Vienna Open; Vienna, Austria; ATP 500; Hard, indoor 26 October – 1 November 2020	41 / 1121	2R	(Croatia) Borna Ćorić	24	Win	7–6^{(13–11)}, 6–3
Vienna Open; Vienna, Austria; ATP 500; Hard, indoor 26 October – 1 November 2020	42 / 1122	QF	(Italy) Lorenzo Sonego (LL)	42	Loss	2–6, 1–6
ATP Finals; London, United Kingdom; ATP Finals; Hard, indoor 16–22 November 2020
ATP Finals; London, United Kingdom; ATP Finals; Hard, indoor 16–22 November 2020	43 / 1123	RR	(Argentina) Diego Schwartzman (8)	9	Win	6–3, 6–2
ATP Finals; London, United Kingdom; ATP Finals; Hard, indoor 16–22 November 2020	44 / 1124	RR	(Russia) Daniil Medvedev (4)	5	Loss	3–6, 3–6
ATP Finals; London, United Kingdom; ATP Finals; Hard, indoor 16–22 November 2020	45 / 1125	RR	(Germany) Alexander Zverev (5)	7	Win	6–3, 7–6^{(7–4)}
ATP Finals; London, United Kingdom; ATP Finals; Hard, indoor 16–22 November 2020	46 / 1126	SF	(Austria) Dominic Thiem (3)	3	Loss	5–7, 7–6^{(12–10)}, 6–7^{(5–7)}

=== Doubles matches ===
Tournament	Match	Round	Opponents (seed or key)	Ranks	Result	Score
2020 ATP Cup; Brisbane, Group A Sydney, Knockout stage Australia Hard, outdoor 3–12 January 2020; Partner: (Serbia) Viktor Troicki
2020 ATP Cup; Brisbane, Group A Sydney, Knockout stage Australia Hard, outdoor 3–12 January 2020; Partner: (Serbia) Viktor Troicki	1 / 125	RR	(France) Nicolas Mahut / (France) Édouard Roger-Vasselin	3 / 15	Win	6–3, 6–7^{(5–7)}, [10–3]
2020 ATP Cup; Brisbane, Group A Sydney, Knockout stage Australia Hard, outdoor 3–12 January 2020; Partner: (Serbia) Viktor Troicki	2 / 126	W	(Spain) Feliciano López / (Spain) Pablo Carreño Busta	54 / 111	Win	6–3, 6–4
Dubai Open; Dubai, UAE; ATP 500; Hard, outdoor 24 February – 1 March 2020; Partner: (Croatia) Marin Čilić
Dubai Open; Dubai, UAE; ATP 500; Hard, outdoor 24 February – 1 March 2020; Partner: (Croatia) Marin Čilić	3 / 127	1R	(United States) Rajeev Ram / (United Kingdom) Joe Salisbury (1)	6 / 5	Loss	2–6, 2–6

== Exhibition matches ==
=== Singles ===
Tournament	Match	Round	Opponent (seed or key)	Rank	Result	Score
2019 World Tennis Championship; Abu Dhabi, United Arab Emirates Hard, outdoor 19–21 December 2019
2019 World Tennis Championship; Abu Dhabi, United Arab Emirates Hard, outdoor 19–21 December 2019	–	QF	Bye			
2019 World Tennis Championship; Abu Dhabi, United Arab Emirates Hard, outdoor 19–21 December 2019	1	SF	(Greece) Stefanos Tsitsipas (3)	6	Loss	6–3, 6–7^{(4–7)}, 4–6
2019 World Tennis Championship; Abu Dhabi, United Arab Emirates Hard, outdoor 19–21 December 2019	2	PO	(Russia) Karen Khachanov (4)	17	Win	7–5, 6–3
2020 Adria Tour Belgrade; Belgrade, Serbia Clay, outdoor 13–14 June 2020
2020 Adria Tour Belgrade; Belgrade, Serbia Clay, outdoor 13–14 June 2020	3	RR	(Serbia) Viktor Troicki	184	Win	4–1, 4–1
2020 Adria Tour Belgrade; Belgrade, Serbia Clay, outdoor 13–14 June 2020	4	RR	(Serbia) Filip Krajinović	32	Loss	4–2, 2–4, 1–4
2020 Adria Tour Belgrade; Belgrade, Serbia Clay, outdoor 13–14 June 2020	5	RR	(Germany) Alexander Zverev	7	Win	4–0, 1–4, 4–2
2020 Adria Tour Zadar; Zadar, Croatia Clay, outdoor 20–21 June 2020
2020 Adria Tour Zadar; Zadar, Croatia Clay, outdoor 20–21 June 2020	6	RR	(Serbia) Peđa Krstin	246	Win	4–3^{(7–3)}, 4–1
2020 Adria Tour Zadar; Zadar, Croatia Clay, outdoor 20–21 June 2020	7	RR	(Croatia) Borna Ćorić	33	Win	4–1, 4–3^{(7–1)}
2020 Adria Tour Zadar; Zadar, Croatia Clay, outdoor 20–21 June 2020	8	RR	(Croatia) Nino Serdarušić	299	Win	4–1, 4–3^{(7–3)}
2020 Adria Tour Zadar; Zadar, Croatia Clay, outdoor 20–21 June 2020	–	F	(Russia) Andrey Rublev	82	—	Canceled due to the COVID-19 pandemic

== Schedule ==
Per Novak Djokovic, this is his current 2020 schedule (subject to change).

=== Singles schedule ===
Date	Tournament	Location	Tier	Surface	Prev. result	Prev. points	New points	Result
3 January 2020– 12 January 2020	ATP Cup	Brisbane, Sydney (AUS)	ATP Cup	Hard	N/A	N/A	665	Champion (defeated (Spain) , 2–1)
6 January 2020– 12 January 2020	Qatar Open	Doha (QAT)	250 Series	Hard	SF	90	0	Participated in ATP Cup
20 January 2020– 2 February 2020	Australian Open	Melbourne (AUS)	Grand Slam	Hard	W	2000	2000	Champion (defeated Dominic Thiem, 6–4, 4–6, 2–6, 6–3, 6–4)
24 February 2020– 1 March 2020	Dubai Open	Dubai (UAE)	500 Series	Hard	N/A	N/A	500	Champion (defeated Stefanos Tsitsipas, 6–3, 6–4)
9 March 2020– 22 March 2020	Indian Wells Masters	Indian Wells (USA)	Masters 1000	Hard	3R	45	45 (Note: Tournaments that were postponed or canceled due to the COVID-19 pandemic had their rankings adjusted – players can use the best result from 2019 or 2020 from the same Tour-level event. If a player's 2019 result is better than his 2020 result, his 2020 result will not be included in his ranking breakdown. And for canceled tournaments player's 2019 results will be included.)	Tournaments cancelled due to the coronavirus pandemic
23 March 2020– 5 April 2020	Miami Open	Miami (USA)	Masters 1000	Hard	4R	90	90	Tournaments cancelled due to the coronavirus pandemic
13 April 2020– 19 April 2020	Monte-Carlo Masters	Monte Carlo (MON)	Masters 1000	Clay	QF	180	180	Tournaments cancelled due to the coronavirus pandemic
4 May 2020– 10 May 2020	Madrid Open	Madrid (ESP)	Masters 1000	Clay	W	1000	1000	Tournaments cancelled due to the coronavirus pandemic
29 June 2020– 12 July 2020	Wimbledon	London (GBR)	Grand Slam	Grass	W	2000	2000	Tournaments cancelled due to the coronavirus pandemic
27 July 2020– 2 August 2020	Summer Olympics	Tokyo (JPN)	Olympic Games	Hard	N/A	N/A	0	Tournament postponed to 2021 due to the coronavirus pandemic
10 August 2020– 16 August 2020	Canadian Open	Toronto (CAN)	Masters 1000	Hard	N/A	N/A	0	Tournament cancelled due to the coronavirus pandemic
24 Aug 2020– 30 Aug 2020	Cincinnati Masters	New York City (USA)	Masters 1000	Hard	SF	360	1000	Champion (defeated Milos Raonic, 1–6, 6–3, 6–4)
31 August 2020– 6 September 2020	US Open	New York (USA)	Grand Slam	Hard	4R	180	180	Fourth round (lost to Pablo Carreño Busta, 5–6, defaulted)
14 September 2020– 20 September 2020 (Note: Tournaments postponed to September due to the COVID-19 pandemic)	Italian Open	Rome (ITA)	Masters 1000	Clay	F	600	1000	Champion (defeated Diego Schwartzman, 7–5, 6–3)
28 September 2020– 11 October 2020	French Open	Paris (FRA)	Grand Slam	Clay	SF	720	1200	Final (lost to Rafael Nadal, 0–6, 2–6, 5–7)
5 October 2020– 11 October 2020	Japan Open	Tokyo (JAP)	500 Series	Hard	W	500	500	Tournaments cancelled due to the coronavirus pandemic
12 October 2020– 18 October 2020	Shanghai Masters	Shanghai (CHN)	Masters 1000	Hard	QF	180	180	Tournaments cancelled due to the coronavirus pandemic
26 October 2020– 1 November 2020	Vienna Open	Vienna (AUT)	500 Series	Hard (i)	N/A	N/A	90	Quarterfinals (lost to Lorenzo Sonego 2–6, 1–6)
2 November 2020– 8 November 2020	Paris Masters	Paris (FRA)	Masters 1000	Hard (i)	W	1000	1000	Withdrew
15 November 2020– 22 November 2020	ATP Finals	London (GBR)	Tour Finals	Hard (i)	RR	200	400	Semifinals (lost to Dominic Thiem 5–7, 7–6^{12–10}, 6–7^{5–7})
Total year-end points						9145	12030	▲2885 difference

=== Doubles schedule ===
Date	Tournament	Location	Tier	Surface	Prev. result	Prev. points	New points	Result
3 January 2020– 12 January 2020	ATP Cup	Brisbane, Sydney (AUS)	ATP Cup	Hard	N/A	N/A	120	Champion (defeated (Spain) , 2–1)
6 January 2020– 12 January 2020	Qatar Open	Doha (QAT)	250 Series	Hard	SF	90	0	Participated in ATP Cup
24 February 2020– 1 March 2020	Dubai Open	Dubai (UAE)	500 Series	Hard	N/A	N/A	0	First round (lost to Ram / Salisbury, 2–6, 2–6)
9 March 2020– 22 March 2020	Indian Wells Masters	Indian Wells (USA)	Masters 1000	Hard	SF	360	360	Tournaments cancelled due to the coronavirus pandemic
12 October 2020– 18 October 2020	Shanghai Masters	Shanghai (CHN)	Masters 1000	Hard	2R	90	90	Tournaments cancelled due to the coronavirus pandemic
Total year-end points						540	570	▲30 difference

== Yearly records ==
=== Head-to-head matchups ===
Novak Djokovic has a 41–5 ATP match win–loss record in the 2020 season. His record against players who were part of the ATP rankings Top Ten at the time of their meetings is 10–3. Bold indicates player was ranked top 10 at the time of at least one meeting. The following list is ordered by number of wins:

- (Argentina) **Diego Schwartzman** 3–0
- (Germany) Jan-Lennard Struff 3–0
- (Lithuania) Ričardas Berankis 2–0
- (Russia) Karen Khachanov 2–0
- (Serbia) Filip Krajinović 2–0
- (France) **Gaël Monfils 2–0**
- (Canada) Milos Raonic 2–0
- (Greece) **Stefanos Tsitsipas 2–0**
- (South Africa) Kevin Anderson 1–0
- (Spain) Roberto Bautista Agut 1–0
- (Italy) Salvatore Caruso 1–0
- (Croatia) Borna Ćorić 1–0
- (Bosnia and Herzegovina) Damir Džumhur 1–0
- (United Kingdom) Kyle Edmund 1–0
- (Switzerland) **Roger Federer 1–0**
- (Colombia) Daniel Elahi Galán 1–0
- (Chile) Cristian Garín 1–0
- (Japan) Tatsuma Ito 1–0
- (Tunisia) Malek Jaziri 1–0
- (Germany) Dominik Koepfer 1–0
- (Germany) Philipp Kohlschreiber 1–0
- (Japan) Yoshihito Nishioka 1–0
- (Norway) Casper Ruud 1–0
- (United States) Tennys Sandgren 1–0
- (Canada) Denis Shapovalov 1–0
- (Sweden) Mikael Ymer 1–0
- (Germany) **Alexander Zverev 1–0**
- (Spain) Pablo Carreño Busta 1–1
- (Russia) **Daniil Medvedev 1–1**
- (Spain) **Rafael Nadal 1–1**
- (Austria) **Dominic Thiem 1–1**
- (Italy) Lorenzo Sonego 0–1

* Statistics correct as of 21 November 2020.

=== Finals ===
==== Singles: 5 (4 titles, 1 runner-up) ====
Category Grand Slam (1–1) ATP Finals (0–0) Masters 1000 (2–0) 500 Series (1–0) 250 Series (0–0)	Titles by surface Hard (3–0) Clay (1–1) Grass (0–0)	Titles by setting Outdoor (4–1) Indoor (0–0)

Result	W–L	Date	Tournament	Tier	Surface	Opponent	Score
Win	1–0	Feb 2020	Australian Open, Australia (8)	Grand Slam	Hard	(Austria) Dominic Thiem	6–4, 4–6, 2–6, 6–3, 6–4
Win	2–0	Feb 2020	Dubai Open, UAE (5)	500 Series	Hard	(Greece) Stefanos Tsitsipas	6–3, 6–4
Win	3–0	Aug 2020	Cincinnati Masters, United States (2)	Masters 1000	Hard	(Canada) Milos Raonic	1–6, 6–3, 6–4
Win	4–0	Sep 2020	Italian Open, Italy (5)	Masters 1000	Clay	(Argentina) Diego Schwartzman	7–5, 6–3
Loss	4–1	Oct 2020	French Open, France	Grand Slam	Clay	(Spain) Rafael Nadal	0–6, 2–6, 5–7

==== Team competitions: (1 title) ====
Result	W–L	Date	Tournament	Tier	Surface	Partner(s)	Opponents	Score
Win	1–0	Jan 2020	ATP Cup, Australia	ATP Cup	Hard (i)	(Serbia) Dušan Lajović (Serbia) Nikola Milojević (Serbia) Viktor Troicki (Serbia) Nikola Ćaćić	(Spain) Rafael Nadal (Spain) Roberto Bautista Agut (Spain) Pablo Carreño Busta (Spain) Albert Ramos Viñolas (Spain) Feliciano López	2–1

=== Earnings ===
- **Bold** font denotes tournament win

**Singles**
Event	Prize money	Year-to-date
**ATP Cup**	**$1,013,160**	$1,013,160
**Australian Open**	**A$4,120,000**	$3,844,836
**Dubai Tennis Championships**	**$565,705**	$4,410,541
**Cincinnati Masters**	**$285,000**	$4,695,541
US Open	$0	$4,695,541
**Italian Open**	**€205,200**	$4,938,579
French Open	€850,000	$5,926,959
Vienna Open	€41,500	$5,976,158
ATP Finals	$459,000	$6,435,158
		$6,435,158
**Doubles**
Event	Prize money	Year-to-date
**ATP Cup**	**$70,175**	$70,175
Dubai Tennis Championships	$5,900	$76,075
		$76,075
**Total**
		**$6,511,233**

Figures in United States dollars (USD) unless noted.

- source：2020 Singles Activity
- source：2020 Doubles Activity

== See also ==
- 2020 ATP Tour
- 2020 Rafael Nadal tennis season
- 2020 Dominic Thiem tennis season
