= 2020 Erste Bank Open =

- Date: 26 October – 1 November
- Edition: 46th
- Category: ATP Tour 500 Series
- Draw: 32S / 16D
- Prize money: €1,409,510
- Surface: Hard
- Location: Vienna, Austria
- Venue: Wiener Stadthalle

Champions

Singles
- (Russia) Andrey Rublev

Doubles
- (Poland) Łukasz Kubot / (Brazil) Marcelo Melo
← 2019 ·	Vienna Open	· 2021 →

The 2020 Erste Bank Open was a men's tennis tournament played on indoor hard courts. It was the 46th edition of the event, and part of the ATP Tour 500 Series of the 2020 ATP Tour. It was held at the Wiener Stadthalle in Vienna, Austria, from 26 October until 1 November 2020.

One seed Andrey Rublev won the singles title.

== Singles main-draw entrants ==
=== Seeds ===
Country	Player	Rank^{1}	Seed
SRB	Novak Djokovic	1	1
AUT	Dominic Thiem	3	2
GRE	Stefanos Tsitsipas	5	3
RUS	Daniil Medvedev	6	4
RUS	Andrey Rublev	8	5
~~ARG~~	~~Diego Schwartzman~~	~~9~~	~~6~~
FRA	Gaël Monfils	11	7
CAN	Denis Shapovalov	12	8

- Rankings are as of 19 October 2020

=== Other entrants ===
The following players received wildcards into the singles main draw:

- (Serbia) Novak Djokovic
- (Austria) Dennis Novak
- (Austria) Jurij Rodionov
- (Italy) Jannik Sinner

The following player received entry using a special exempt:

- (United Kingdom) Dan Evans

The following players received entry using a protected ranking into the singles main draw:

- (South Africa) Kevin Anderson
- ~~(Japan) Kei Nishikori~~

The following players received entry from the qualifying draw:

- (Hungary) Attila Balázs
- (Slovenia) Aljaž Bedene
- (Slovakia) Norbert Gombos
- (Canada) Vasek Pospisil

The following players received entry as lucky losers:

- (Chinese Taipei) Jason Jung
- (Ukraine) Vitaliy Sachko
- (Italy) Lorenzo Sonego

=== Withdrawals ===
- (Italy) Matteo Berrettini → replaced by (United States) Taylor Fritz
- (Italy) Fabio Fognini → replaced by (Serbia) Filip Krajinović
- (Belgium) David Goffin → replaced by (Germany) Jan-Lennard Struff
- (United States) John Isner → replaced by (Chinese Taipei) Jason Jung
- (Japan) Kei Nishikori → replaced by (Ukraine) Vitaliy Sachko
- (Canada) Milos Raonic → replaced by (Poland) Hubert Hurkacz
- (Argentina) Diego Schwartzman → replaced by (Italy) Lorenzo Sonego

== Doubles main-draw entrants ==
=== Seeds ===
Country	Player	Country	Player	Rank^{1}	Seed
CRO	Mate Pavić	BRA	Bruno Soares	11	1
USA	Rajeev Ram	GBR	Joe Salisbury	16	2
POL	Łukasz Kubot	BRA	Marcelo Melo	24	3
FRA	Pierre-Hugues Herbert	FRA	Nicolas Mahut	25	4

- Rankings are as of 19 October 2020

=== Other entrants ===
The following pairs received wildcards into the doubles main draw:

- (Austria) Dominic Thiem / (Austria) Dennis Novak
- (United Kingdom) Daniel Evans / (Austria) Oliver Marach

The following pair received entry from the qualifying draw:

- (Poland) Karol Drzewiecki / (Poland) Szymon Walków

== Finals ==
=== Singles ===
- (Russia) Andrey Rublev def. (Italy) Lorenzo Sonego, 6–4, 6–4

=== Doubles ===
- (Poland) Łukasz Kubot / (Brazil) Marcelo Melo def. (United Kingdom) Jamie Murray / (United Kingdom) Neal Skupski, 7–6^{(7–5)}, 7–5
