= 2019 Erste Bank Open – Doubles =

Doubles
- 2019 Erste Bank Open

Final
- Champions: (United States) Rajeev Ram (United Kingdom) Joe Salisbury
- Runners-up: (Poland) Łukasz Kubot (Brazil) Marcelo Melo
- Score: 6–4, 6–7^{(5–7)}, [10–5]

Details
- Draw: 16
- Seeds: 4

Events
Singles	Doubles
← 2018 ·	Vienna Open	· 2020 →

Joe Salisbury and Neal Skupski were the defending champions, but Skupski chose to compete in Basel instead.

Salisbury played alongside Rajeev Ram and successfully defended the title, defeating Łukasz Kubot and Marcelo Melo in the final, 6–4, 6–7^{(5–7)}, [10–5].

== Seeds ==
1. (Poland) Łukasz Kubot / (Brazil) Marcelo Melo (final)
2. (Croatia) Mate Pavić / (Brazil) Bruno Soares (withdrew)
3. (France) Pierre-Hugues Herbert / (France) Nicolas Mahut (semifinals)
4. (United States) Rajeev Ram / (United Kingdom) Joe Salisbury (champions)

== Draw ==
=== Key ===
- Q = Qualifier
- WC = Wild card
- LL = Lucky loser
- Alt = Alternate
- SE = Special exempt
- PR = Protected ranking
- ITF = ITF entry
- JE = Junior exempt
- w/o = Walkover
- r = Retired
- d = Defaulted
- SR = Special ranking

=== Draw ===
First round
1	(Poland) L Kubot (Brazil) M Melo	6	6
(Argentina) M González (Argentina) G Pella	2	3
(Austria) O Marach (Austria) J Melzer	6^{6}	2
(India) R Bopanna (Canada) D Shapovalov	7^{8}	6
3	(France) P-H Herbert (France) N Mahut	6	6
(Bulgaria) G Dimitrov (Spain) F López	1	4
(Argentina) A Molteni (Argentina) D Schwartzman	6^{5}	6	[10]
(United Kingdom) D Inglot (United States) A Krajicek	7^{7}	3	[5]
WC	(Austria) S Ofner (Austria) T-S Weissborn	2	4
Q	(United Kingdom) L Bambridge (Japan) B McLachlan	6	6
(Russia) K Khachanov (Russia) A Rublev	4	6^{4}
4	(United States) R Ram (United Kingdom) J Salisbury	6	7^{7}
WC	(New Zealand) M Daniell (Austria) P Oswald	4	7	[10]
(Belgium) S Gillé (Belgium) J Vliegen	6	5	[7]
(Finland) H Kontinen (Australia) J Peers	6	6
LL	(Denmark) F Nielsen (Germany) T Pütz	2	3

Quarterfinals
1	(Poland) L Kubot (Brazil) M Melo	6	6
(India) R Bopanna (Canada) D Shapovalov	0	4
3	(France) P-H Herbert (France) N Mahut	6	6
(Argentina) A Molteni (Argentina) D Schwartzman	3	2
Q	(United Kingdom) L Bambridge (Japan) B McLachlan	5	4
4	(United States) R Ram (United Kingdom) J Salisbury	7	6
WC	(New Zealand) M Daniell (Austria) P Oswald	7^{7}	7^{7}
(Finland) H Kontinen (Australia) J Peers	6^{2}	6^{5}

Semifinals
1	(Poland) L Kubot (Brazil) M Melo	6	6
3	(France) P-H Herbert (France) N Mahut	4	4
4	(United States) R Ram (United Kingdom) J Salisbury	6	3	[10]
WC	(New Zealand) M Daniell (Austria) P Oswald	4	6	[6]

Final
1	(Poland) L Kubot (Brazil) M Melo	4	7^{7}	[5]
4	(United States) R Ram (United Kingdom) J Salisbury	6	6^{5}	[10]

== Qualifying ==
=== Seeds ===
1. (United Kingdom) Luke Bambridge / (Japan) Ben McLachlan (qualified)
2. (Denmark) Frederik Nielsen / (Germany) Tim Pütz (qualifying competition, lucky losers)

=== Qualifiers ===
1. (United Kingdom) Luke Bambridge / (Japan) Ben McLachlan

=== Lucky losers ===
1. (Denmark) Frederik Nielsen / (Germany) Tim Pütz

=== Qualifying draw ===
First round
1	(United Kingdom) Luke Bambridge (Japan) Ben McLachlan	6	3	[10]
WC	(Austria) Lucas Miedler (Austria) Dennis Novak	3	6	[3]
(Poland) Hubert Hurkacz (United States) Sam Querrey	5	3
2	(Denmark) Frederik Nielsen (Germany) Tim Pütz	7	6

Qualifying competition
1	(United Kingdom) Luke Bambridge (Japan) Ben McLachlan	6	6
2	(Denmark) Frederik Nielsen (Germany) Tim Pütz	3	4
