= 2020 Abierto Mexicano Telcel – Women's singles =

Women's singles
- 2020 Abierto Mexicano Telcel

Final
- Champion: (United Kingdom) Heather Watson
- Runner-up: (Canada) Leylah Annie Fernandez
- Score: 6–4, 6–7^{(8–10)}, 6–1

Details
- Draw: 32
- Seeds: 8

Events
Singles	men	women
Doubles	men	women
- Abierto Mexicano Telcel

Heather Watson won the title, defeating qualifier Leylah Annie Fernandez in the final, 6–4, 6–7^{(8–10)}, 6–1. It was Watson's fourth WTA Tour singles title and Fernandez's maiden final at this level.

Wang Yafan was the defending champion, but lost to compatriot Wang Xiyu in the first round.

== Seeds ==
1. (United States) Sloane Stephens (first round)
2. (China) Wang Yafan (first round)
3. (Czech Republic) Marie Bouzková (first round)
4. (United States) Lauren Davis (first round)
5. (United States) Venus Williams (first round)
6. (China) Zhu Lin (quarterfinals)
7. (United Kingdom) Heather Watson (champion)
8. (Japan) Nao Hibino (second round)

== Draw ==
Key

- Q = Qualifier
- WC = Wild card
- LL = Lucky loser
- Alt = Alternate
- ITF = ITF entry
- PR = Protected ranking
- SR = Special ranking
- SE = Special exempt
- JE = Junior exempt
- JR = Junior Accelerator Programme entrant
- CO = College Accelerator Programme entrant
- NG = Next Gen Accelerator Program entrant
- w/o = Walkover
- r = Retired
- d = Defaulted

=== Finals ===
Semifinals
WC	(Mexico) Renata Zarazúa	3	3
Q	(Canada) Leylah Annie Fernandez	6	6
7	(United Kingdom) Heather Watson	6	7^{8}
Q	(China) Wang Xiyu	4	6^{6}

Final
Q	(Canada) Leylah Annie Fernandez	4	7^{10}	1
7	(United Kingdom) Heather Watson	6	6^{8}	6

=== Top half ===
First round
1	(United States) S Stephens	4	2
WC	(Mexico) R Zarazúa	6	6
PR	(United States) S Rogers	2	6^{5}
WC	(United States) K Volynets	6	7^{7}
(Slovenia) T Zidanšek	6	6
(Russia) A Kalinskaya	3	4
Q	(Slovenia) K Juvan	4	7^{7}	6
5/WC	(United States) V Williams	6	6^{4}	2
3	(Czech Republic) M Bouzková	4	6	2
(Germany) T Maria	6	1	6
(Russia) A Potapova	4	7	6
PR	(Slovakia) AK Schmiedlová	6	5	1
Q	(Canada) LA Fernandez	6	6
(Serbia) N Stojanović	4	1
(Netherlands) A Rus	3	1
8	(Japan) N Hibino	6	6

Second round
WC	(Mexico) R Zarazúa	4	7	6
WC	(United States) K Volynets	6	5	0
(Slovenia) T Zidanšek	6	6
Q	(Slovenia) K Juvan	2	2
(Germany) T Maria	3	3
(Russia) A Potapova	6	6
Q	(Canada) LA Fernandez	6	6
8	(Japan) N Hibino	3	0

Quarterfinals
WC	(Mexico) R Zarazúa	6	3	6
(Slovenia) T Zidanšek	2	6	2
(Russia) A Potapova	3	5
Q	(Canada) LA Fernandez	6	7

Semifinals
WC	(Mexico) R Zarazúa	3	3
Q	(Canada) LA Fernandez	6	6

=== Bottom half ===
First round
7	(United Kingdom) H Watson	4	6	6
PR	(United States) C Vandeweghe	6	4	4
PR	(Ukraine) K Bondarenko	6^{7}	6	6
(Montenegro) D Kovinić	7^{9}	4	2
Q	(United States) UM Arconada	2	2
Q	(United States) C Dolehide	6	6
(United States) C McHale	6	1	6
4	(United States) L Davis	2	6	4
6	(China) L Zhu	7^{7}	6
(Ukraine) K Zavatska	6^{2}	2
PR	(United Kingdom) K Boulter	2	6	6
LL	(United States) F Di Lorenzo	6	3	2
Q	(Italy) S Errani	7	6
(Spain) S Sorribes Tormo	5	4
Q	(China) Xiy Wang	6	7^{10}
2	(China) Y Wang	4	6^{8}

Second round
7	(United Kingdom) H Watson	7^{7}	6
PR	(Ukraine) K Bondarenko	6^{2}	2
Q	(United States) C Dolehide	7	4	3
(United States) C McHale	5	6	6
6	(China) L Zhu	7^{7}	7
PR	(United Kingdom) K Boulter	6^{2}	5
Q	(Italy) S Errani	5	7^{7}	1
Q	(China) Xiy Wang	7	6^{3}	6

Quarterfinals
7	(United Kingdom) H Watson	6	1	6
(United States) C McHale	3	6	1
6	(China) L Zhu	2	2
Q	(China) Xiy Wang	6	6

Semifinals
7	(United Kingdom) H Watson	6	7^{8}
Q	(China) Xiy Wang	4	6^{6}

== Qualifying ==
=== Seeds ===
1. (Switzerland) Stefanie Vögele (first round)
2. (United States) Francesca Di Lorenzo (qualifying competition, lucky loser)
3. (Australia) Lizette Cabrera (first round)
4. (Slovenia) Kaja Juvan (qualified)
5. (Australia) Astra Sharma (first round)
6. (China) Wang Xiyu (qualified)
7. (United States) Nicole Gibbs (qualifying competition)
8. (United States) Usue Maitane Arconada (qualified)
9. (Ukraine) Anhelina Kalinina (qualifying competition)
10. (United States) Caroline Dolehide (qualified)
11. (Spain) Lara Arruabarrena (first round)
12. (United States) Allie Kiick (first round)

=== Qualifiers ===
1. (Italy) Sara Errani
2. (United States) Usue Maitane Arconada
3. (Canada) Leylah Annie Fernandez
4. (Slovenia) Kaja Juvan
5. (United States) Caroline Dolehide
6. (China) Wang Xiyu

=== Lucky loser ===
1. (United States) Francesca Di Lorenzo

=== Draw ===
==== First qualifier ====
First round
1	(Switzerland) Stefanie Vögele	1	2
WC	(Italy) Sara Errani	6	6
WC	(Mexico) Fernanda Contreras Gómez	2	3
7	(United States) Nicole Gibbs	6	6

Qualifying competition
WC	(Italy) Sara Errani	6	6
7	(United States) Nicole Gibbs	3	0

==== Second qualifier ====
First round
2	(United States) Francesca Di Lorenzo	6	6
WC	(Mexico) María José Portillo Ramírez	3	1
(Italy) Elisabetta Cocciaretto	6	3	4
8	(United States) Usue Maitane Arconada	3	6	6

Qualifying competition
2	(United States) Francesca Di Lorenzo	3	3
8	(United States) Usue Maitane Arconada	6	6

==== Third qualifier ====
First round
3	(Australia) Lizette Cabrera	3	1
WC	(Canada) Leylah Annie Fernandez	6	6
(United States) Varvara Lepchenko	7	6
12	(United States) Allie Kiick	5	4

Qualifying competition
WC	(Canada) Leylah Annie Fernandez	6	6
(United States) Varvara Lepchenko	3	3

==== Fourth qualifier ====
First round
4	(Slovenia) Kaja Juvan	7^{7}	7^{7}
(Argentina) Nadia Podoroska	6^{5}	6^{2}
(Paraguay) Verónica Cepede Royg	7^{7}	3	6
11	(Spain) Lara Arruabarrena	6^{5}	6	1

Qualifying competition
4	(Slovenia) Kaja Juvan	6	6
(Paraguay) Verónica Cepede Royg	2	3

==== Fifth qualifier ====
First round
5	(Australia) Astra Sharma	4	7	3
(Italy) Giulia Gatto-Monticone	6	5	6
(Italy) Martina Trevisan	6	3	2
10	(United States) Caroline Dolehide	4	6	6

Qualifying competition
(Italy) Giulia Gatto-Monticone	1	6^{6}
10	(United States) Caroline Dolehide	6	7^{8}

==== Sixth qualifier ====
First round
6	(China) Wang Xiyu	6	6
(Japan) Mayo Hibi	3	4
(Slovakia) Kristína Kučová	3	1
9	(Ukraine) Anhelina Kalinina	6	6

Qualifying competition
6	(China) Wang Xiyu	7^{7}	7
9	(Ukraine) Anhelina Kalinina	6^{0}	5
