= 2019 Erste Bank Open – Singles =

Singles
- 2019 Erste Bank Open

Final
- Champion: (Austria) Dominic Thiem
- Runner-up: (Argentina) Diego Schwartzman
- Score: 3–6, 6–4, 6–3

Details
- Draw: 32 (4 Q / 3 WC )
- Seeds: 8

Events
Singles	Doubles
- Vienna Open

Kevin Anderson was the defending champion, but could not participate this year due to a knee injury.

Dominic Thiem won the title, defeating Diego Schwartzman in the final, 3–6, 6–4, 6–3. Thiem was the first local player to win both Austrian ATP tournaments (Kitzbühel and Vienna) in the same year.

== Seeds ==
1. (Austria) Dominic Thiem (champion)
2. (Russia) Karen Khachanov (quarterfinals)
3. (Italy) Matteo Berrettini (semifinals)
4. (France) Gaël Monfils (semifinals)
5. (Argentina) Diego Schwartzman (final)
6. (Canada) Félix Auger-Aliassime (withdrew)
7. (Argentina) Guido Pella (first round)
8. (Croatia) Borna Ćorić (first round)

== Draw ==
Key

- Q = Qualifier
- WC = Wild card
- LL = Lucky loser
- Alt = Alternate
- ITF = ITF entry
- PR = Protected ranking
- SR = Special ranking
- SE = Special exempt
- JE = Junior exempt
- JR = Junior Accelerator Programme entrant
- CO = College Accelerator Programme entrant
- NG = Next Gen Accelerator Program entrant
- w/o = Walkover
- r = Retired
- d = Defaulted

=== Finals ===
Semifinals
1	(Austria) Dominic Thiem	3	7	6
3	(Italy) Matteo Berrettini	6	5	3
4	(France) Gaël Monfils	3	2
5	(Argentina) Diego Schwartzman	6	6

Final
1	(Austria) Dominic Thiem	3	6	6
5	(Argentina) Diego Schwartzman	6	4	3

=== Top half ===
First round
1	(Austria) D Thiem	6	7^{7}
WC	(France) J-W Tsonga	4	6^{2}
(Georgia (country)) N Basilashvili	6	2	1
(Spain) F Verdasco	4	6	6
(Spain) P Carreño Busta	6	7
(Canada) D Shapovalov	3	5
(Kazakhstan) M Kukushkin	6	6
8	(Croatia) B Ćorić	4	4
3	(Italy) M Berrettini	3	6	6
(United Kingdom) K Edmund	6	3	4
(Bulgaria) G Dimitrov	6	7
Q	(Bosnia and Herzegovina) D Džumhur	3	5
(South Korea) H Chung	6	7
(Canada) M Raonic	4	5
(Russia) A Rublev	6	6^{3}	7^{8}
LL	(Kazakhstan) A Bublik	1	7^{7}	6^{6}

Second round
1	(Austria) D Thiem	3	6	6
(Spain) F Verdasco	6	3	2
(Spain) P Carreño Busta	6^{3}	6	6
(Kazakhstan) M Kukushkin	7^{7}	4	1
3	(Italy) M Berrettini	7^{7}	7^{7}
(Bulgaria) G Dimitrov	6^{5}	6^{1}
(South Korea) H Chung	4	2
(Russia) A Rublev	6	6

Quarterfinals
1	(Austria) D Thiem	5
(Spain) P Carreño Busta	0^{r}
3	(Italy) M Berrettini	7	7^{7}
(Russia) A Rublev	5	6^{4}

Semifinals
1	(Austria) D Thiem	3	7	6
3	(Italy) M Berrettini	6	5	3

=== Bottom half ===
First round
7	(Argentina) G Pella	4	4
Q	(Slovenia) A Bedene	6	6
(Spain) F López	4	3
(France) G Simon	6	6
WC	(Italy) J Sinner	6	6
Q	(Germany) P Kohlschreiber	3	4
WC	(Austria) D Novak	6	5	3
4	(France) G Monfils	2	7	6
5	(Argentina) D Schwartzman	6	6
(France) P-H Herbert	4	4
(United States) S Querrey	6	6
SE	(France) A Mannarino	3	4
Q	(Hungary) M Fucsovics	6	6
(Italy) L Sonego	4	4
(Poland) H Hurkacz	4	6^{3}
2	(Russia) K Khachanov	6	7^{7}

Second round
Q	(Slovenia) A Bedene	6	3	6
(France) G Simon	2	6	3
WC	(Italy) J Sinner	3	6^{8}
4	(France) G Monfils	6	7^{10}
5	(Argentina) D Schwartzman	6^{5}	6	7^{7}
(United States) S Querrey	7^{7}	4	6^{5}
Q	(Hungary) M Fucsovics	3	6	1^{r}
2	(Russia) K Khachanov	6	4	4

Quarterfinals
Q	(Slovenia) A Bedene	5	1
4	(France) G Monfils	7	6
5	(Argentina) D Schwartzman	7^{8}	6
2	(Russia) K Khachanov	6^{6}	2

Semifinals
4	(France) G Monfils	3	2
5	(Argentina) D Schwartzman	6	6

== Qualifying ==
=== Seeds ===
1. (Kazakhstan) Alexander Bublik (qualifying competition, lucky loser)
2. (United Kingdom) Cameron Norrie (qualifying competition)
3. (Hungary) Márton Fucsovics (qualified)
4. (Slovenia) Aljaž Bedene (qualified)
5. (Germany) Philipp Kohlschreiber (qualified)
6. (Argentina) Federico Delbonis (qualifying competition)
7. (Chile) Nicolás Jarry (first round)
8. (Italy) Stefano Travaglia (qualifying competition)

=== Qualifiers ===
1. (Bosnia and Herzegovina) Damir Džumhur
2. (Germany) Philipp Kohlschreiber
3. (Hungary) Márton Fucsovics
4. (Slovenia) Aljaž Bedene

=== Lucky loser ===
1. (Kazakhstan) Alexander Bublik

=== Qualifying draw ===
==== First qualifier ====
First round
1	(Kazakhstan) Alexander Bublik	7^{7}	6
(Poland) Kamil Majchrzak	6^{1}	4
(Bosnia and Herzegovina) Damir Džumhur	6	6
7	(Chile) Nicolás Jarry	4	4

Qualifying competition
1	(Kazakhstan) Alexander Bublik	3	6	1
(Bosnia and Herzegovina) Damir Džumhur	6	3	6

==== Second qualifier ====
First round
2	(United Kingdom) Cameron Norrie	6	6
WC	(Austria) Alexander Erler	4	2
WC	(Austria) Sebastian Ofner	4	5
5	(Germany) Philipp Kohlschreiber	6	7

Qualifying competition
2	(United Kingdom) Cameron Norrie	3	3
5	(Germany) Philipp Kohlschreiber	6	6

==== Third qualifier ====
First round
3	(Hungary) Márton Fucsovics	6	6
(Belarus) Egor Gerasimov	4	1
WC	(Austria) Lucas Miedler	6^{5}	4
8	(Italy) Stefano Travaglia	7^{7}	6

Qualifying competition
3	(Hungary) Márton Fucsovics	6	1	6
8	(Italy) Stefano Travaglia	3	6	2

==== Fourth qualifier ====
First round
4	(Slovenia) Aljaž Bedene	6	6
PR	(Slovakia) Jozef Kovalík	2	4
Alt	(Belarus) Ilya Ivashka	6^{7}	6	3
6	(Argentina) Federico Delbonis	7^{9}	4	6

Qualifying competition
4	(Slovenia) Aljaž Bedene	6	7^{8}
6	(Argentina) Federico Delbonis	2	6^{6}
