= 2020 Abierto Mexicano Telcel – Women's doubles =

Women's doubles
- 2020 Abierto Mexicano Telcel

Final
- Champions: (United States) Desirae Krawczyk (Mexico) Giuliana Olmos
- Runners-up: (Ukraine) Kateryna Bondarenko (Canada) Sharon Fichman
- Score: 6–3, 7–6^{(7–5)}

Events
Singles	men	women
Doubles	men	women
← 2019 ·	Abierto Mexicano Telcel

Victoria Azarenka and Zheng Saisai were the defending champions, but Azarenka chose not to participate and Zheng chose to compete in Doha instead.

Desirae Krawczyk and Giuliana Olmos won the title, defeating Kateryna Bondarenko and Sharon Fichman in the final, 6–3, 7–6^{(7–5)}.

== Seeds ==
1. (Spain) Georgina García Pérez / (Spain) Sara Sorribes Tormo (first round)
2. (United States) Desirae Krawczyk / (Mexico) Giuliana Olmos (champions)
3. (Australia) Ellen Perez / (Australia) Storm Sanders (semifinals)
4. (Australia) Monique Adamczak / (United States) Maria Sanchez (first round)

== Draw ==
=== Key ===
- Q = Qualifier
- WC = Wild card
- LL = Lucky loser
- Alt = Alternate
- SE = Special exempt
- PR = Protected ranking
- ITF = ITF entry
- JE = Junior exempt
- w/o = Walkover
- r = Retired
- d = Defaulted
- SR = Special ranking

=== Draw ===
First round
1	(Spain) G García Pérez (Spain) S Sorribes Tormo	3	1
(United States) S Santamaria (Serbia) N Stojanović	6	6
PR	(Ukraine) K Bondarenko (Canada) S Fichman	4	6	[12]
(Czech Republic) M Bouzková (Czech Republic) R Voráčová	6	2	[10]
3	(Australia) E Perez (Australia) S Sanders	6	6
(China) Y Wang (China) L Zhu	1	2
(Japan) N Hibino (United Kingdom) H Watson	6	6
(Slovenia) D Jakupović (Montenegro) D Kovinić	4	1
(Spain) L Arruabarrena (United States) C McHale	4	3
(United States) C Dolehide (Australia) A Sharma	6	6
WC	(Italy) S Errani (Chile) D Seguel	6	6
4	(Australia) M Adamczak (United States) M Sanchez	4	0
(Sweden) C Lister (Russia) Y Sizikova	1	6	[5]
Alt	(Netherlands) A Rus (Slovenia) T Zidanšek	6	3	[10]
(Russia) A Kalinskaya (Russia) A Potapova	5	4
2	(United States) D Krawczyk (Mexico) G Olmos	7	6

Quarterfinals
(United States) S Santamaria (Serbia) N Stojanović	6^{5}	2
PR	(Ukraine) K Bondarenko (Canada) S Fichman	7^{7}	6
3	(Australia) E Perez (Australia) S Sanders	6	5	[10]
(Japan) N Hibino (United Kingdom) H Watson	3	7	[7]
(United States) C Dolehide (Australia) A Sharma	4
WC	(Italy) S Errani (Chile) D Seguel	1^{r}
Alt	(Netherlands) A Rus (Slovenia) T Zidanšek	3	6	[3]
2	(United States) D Krawczyk (Mexico) G Olmos	6	1	[10]

Semifinals
PR	(Ukraine) K Bondarenko (Canada) S Fichman	6	6
3	(Australia) E Perez (Australia) S Sanders	3	4
(United States) C Dolehide (Australia) A Sharma	4	2
2	(United States) D Krawczyk (Mexico) G Olmos	6	6

Final
PR	(Ukraine) K Bondarenko (Canada) S Fichman	3	6^{5}
2	(United States) D Krawczyk (Mexico) G Olmos	6	7^{7}
