= 2020 Erste Bank Open – Doubles =

Doubles
- 2020 Erste Bank Open

Final
- Champions: (Poland) Łukasz Kubot (Brazil) Marcelo Melo
- Runners-up: (United Kingdom) Jamie Murray (United Kingdom) Neal Skupski
- Score: 7–6^{(7–5)}, 7–5

Details
- Draw: 16
- Seeds: 4

Events
Singles	Doubles
← 2019 ·	Vienna Open	· 2021 →

Łukasz Kubot and Marcelo Melo won the title, defeating Murray and Skupski in the final, 7–6^{(7–5)}, 7–5.

Rajeev Ram and Joe Salisbury were the defending champions, but they withdrew from the tournament before their quarterfinal match against Jamie Murray and Neal Skupski.

== Seeds ==
1. (Croatia) Mate Pavić / (Brazil) Bruno Soares (quarterfinals)
2. (United States) Rajeev Ram / (United Kingdom) Joe Salisbury (quarterfinals, withdrew)
3. (Poland) Łukasz Kubot / (Brazil) Marcelo Melo (champions)
4. (France) Pierre-Hugues Herbert / (France) Nicolas Mahut (first round)

== Draw ==
=== Key ===
- Q = Qualifier
- WC = Wild card
- LL = Lucky loser
- Alt = Alternate
- SE = Special exempt
- PR = Protected ranking
- ITF = ITF entry
- JE = Junior exempt
- w/o = Walkover
- r = Retired
- d = Defaulted
- SR = Special ranking

=== Draw ===
First round
1	(Croatia) M Pavić (Brazil) B Soares	7^{9}	6
Q	(Poland) K Drzewiecki (Poland) S Walków	6^{7}	3
(Germany) K Krawietz (Germany) A Mies	6	6
(Australia) J Peers (New Zealand) M Venus	4	4
3	(Poland) Ł Kubot (Brazil) M Melo	7^{7}	6^{4}	[10]
(South Africa) R Klaasen (Netherlands) J-J Rojer	6^{4}	7^{7}	[7]
(Austria) J Melzer (France) É Roger-Vasselin	6	7
WC	(United Kingdom) D Evans (Austria) O Marach	2	5
(Colombia) R Farah (France) F Martin	7	6
(Netherlands) W Koolhof (Croatia) N Mektić	5	3
(Russia) K Khachanov (Russia) A Rublev	7^{11}	3	[10]
4	(France) P-H Herbert (France) N Mahut	6^{9}	6	[2]
(United Kingdom) J Murray (United Kingdom) N Skupski	7	6^{1}	[10]
WC	(Austria) D Novak (Austria) D Thiem	5	7^{7}	[5]
(Bulgaria) G Dimitrov (Switzerland) S Wawrinka	4	6	[6]
2	(United States) R Ram (United Kingdom) J Salisbury	6	3	[10]

Quarterfinals
1	(Croatia) M Pavić (Brazil) B Soares	1	6	[8]
(Germany) K Krawietz (Germany) A Mies	6	4	[10]
3	(Poland) Ł Kubot (Brazil) M Melo	7	6
(Austria) J Melzer (France) É Roger-Vasselin	5	3
(Colombia) R Farah (France) F Martin	6^{5}	6	[10]
(Russia) K Khachanov (Russia) A Rublev	7^{7}	4	[2]
(United Kingdom) J Murray (United Kingdom) N Skupski	w/o
2	(United States) R Ram (United Kingdom) J Salisbury

Semifinals
(Germany) K Krawietz (Germany) A Mies	6	4	[8]
3	(Poland) Ł Kubot (Brazil) M Melo	4	6	[10]
(Colombia) R Farah (France) F Martin	4	4
(United Kingdom) J Murray (United Kingdom) N Skupski	6	6

Final
3	(Poland) Ł Kubot (Brazil) M Melo	7^{7}	7
(United Kingdom) J Murray (United Kingdom) N Skupski	6^{5}	5

== Qualifying ==
=== Seeds ===
1. (Poland) Karol Drzewiecki / (Poland) Szymon Walków (qualified)
2. (Croatia) Ivan Sabanov / (Croatia) Matej Sabanov (qualifying competition)

=== Qualifiers ===
1. (Poland) Karol Drzewiecki / (Poland) Szymon Walków

=== Qualifying draw ===
First round
1	(Poland) Karol Drzewiecki (Poland) Szymon Walków	7^{7}	7^{7}
(Austria) Alexander Erler (Austria) David Pichler	6^{3}	6^{5}
WC	(Austria) Lucas Miedler (Austria) Jurij Rodionov	6^{3}	6^{0}
2	(Croatia) Ivan Sabanov (Croatia) Matej Sabanov	7^{7}	7^{7}

Qualifying competition
1	(Poland) Karol Drzewiecki (Poland) Szymon Walków	6	6
2	(Croatia) Ivan Sabanov (Croatia) Matej Sabanov	4	1
