= 2019 Erste Bank Open =

- Date: 21–27 October
- Edition: 45th
- Category: ATP Tour 500 Series
- Draw: 32S / 16D
- Prize money: €2,296,490
- Surface: Hard / indoor
- Location: Vienna, Austria
- Venue: Wiener Stadthalle

Champions

Singles
- (Austria) Dominic Thiem

Doubles
- (United States) Rajeev Ram / (United Kingdom) Joe Salisbury
- Vienna Open

The 2019 Erste Bank Open was a men's tennis tournament played on indoor hard courts. It was the 45th edition of the event, and part of the ATP Tour 500 Series of the 2019 ATP Tour. It was held at the Wiener Stadthalle in Vienna, Austria, from 21 October until 27 October 2019.

== Finals ==
=== Singles ===
- (Austria) Dominic Thiem defeated (Argentina) Diego Schwartzman, 3–6, 6–4, 6–3

=== Doubles ===
- (United States) Rajeev Ram / (United Kingdom) Joe Salisbury defeated (Poland) Łukasz Kubot / (Brazil) Marcelo Melo, 6–4, 6–7^{(5–7)}, [10–5]

== Singles main-draw entrants ==
=== Seeds ===
Country	Player	Rank^{1}	Seed
AUT	Dominic Thiem	5	1
RUS	Karen Khachanov	8	2
ITA	Matteo Berrettini	11	3
FRA	Gaël Monfils	13	4
ARG	Diego Schwartzman	15	5
~~CAN~~	~~Félix Auger-Aliassime~~	~~17~~	~~6~~
ARG	Guido Pella	20	7
CRO	Borna Ćorić	22	8

- Rankings are as of October 14, 2019

=== Other entrants ===
The following players received wildcards into the singles main draw:

- (Austria) Dennis Novak
- (Italy) Jannik Sinner
- (France) Jo-Wilfried Tsonga

The following player received entry as a special exempt:

- (France) Adrian Mannarino

The following players received entry from the qualifying draw:

- (Slovenia) Aljaž Bedene
- (Bosnia and Herzegovina) Damir Džumhur
- (Hungary) Márton Fucsovics
- (Germany) Philipp Kohlschreiber

The following player received entry as a lucky loser:

- (Kazakhstan) Alexander Bublik

=== Withdrawals ===
Before the tournament

- (Canada) Félix Auger-Aliassime → replaced by (Kazakhstan) Alexander Bublik
- (Argentina) Juan Martín del Potro → replaced by (Russia) Andrey Rublev
- (France) Lucas Pouille → replaced by (France) Pierre-Hugues Herbert
- (Australia) Nick Kyrgios → replaced by (Italy) Lorenzo Sonego
- (Russia) Daniil Medvedev → replaced by (Spain) Feliciano López
- (Japan) Kei Nishikori → replaced by (United States) Sam Querrey

=== Retirements ===
- (Spain) Pablo Carreño Busta
- (Hungary) Márton Fucsovics

== Doubles main-draw entrants ==
=== Seeds ===
Country	Player	Country	Player	Rank^{1}	Seed
POL	Łukasz Kubot	BRA	Marcelo Melo	13	1
~~CRO~~	~~Mate Pavić~~	~~BRA~~	~~Bruno Soares~~	~~21~~	~~2~~
FRA	Pierre-Hugues Herbert	FRA	Nicolas Mahut	27	3
USA	Rajeev Ram	GBR	Joe Salisbury	42	4

  - ^{1} Rankings are as of October 14, 2019

=== Other entrants ===
The following pairs received wildcards into the doubles main draw:

- (Austria) Sebastian Ofner / (Austria) Tristan-Samuel Weissborn
- (New Zealand) Marcus Daniell / (Austria) Philipp Oswald

The following pair received entry from the qualifying draw:

- (United Kingdom) Luke Bambridge / (Japan) Ben McLachlan

The following pair received entry as lucky losers:

- (Denmark) Frederik Nielsen / (Germany) Tim Pütz

=== Withdrawals ===
Before the tournament

- (Croatia) Mate Pavić
