= 2020 Abierto Mexicano Telcel =

- Date: 24–29 February
- Edition: 27th (men) / 20th (women)
- Draw: 32S / 16D
- Surface: Hard / outdoor
- Location: Acapulco, Mexico
- Venue: Princess Mundo Imperial

Champions

Men's singles
- (Spain) Rafael Nadal

Women's singles
- (United Kingdom) Heather Watson

Men's doubles
- (Poland) Łukasz Kubot / (Brazil) Marcelo Melo

Women's doubles
- (United States) Desirae Krawczyk / (Mexico) Giuliana Olmos
← 2019 ·	Mexican Open	· 2021 →

The 2020 Mexican Open (alson known as the Abierto Mexicano Telcel presentado por HSBC for sponsorship reasons) was a professional tennis tournament played on outdoor hard courts. It was the 27th edition of the men's Mexican Open (20th for the women), and part of the 2020 ATP Tour and the 2020 WTA Tour. It took place in Acapulco, Mexico between 24 and 29 February 2020, at the Princess Mundo Imperial.

== Finals ==
=== Men's singles ===
- (Spain) Rafael Nadal defeated (United States) Taylor Fritz, 6–3, 6–2

=== Women's singles ===
- (United Kingdom) Heather Watson defeated (Canada) Leylah Annie Fernandez, 6–4, 6–7^{(8–10)}, 6–1

=== Men's doubles ===
- (Poland) Łukasz Kubot / (Brazil) Marcelo Melo defeated (Colombia) Juan Sebastián Cabal / (Colombia) Robert Farah, 7–6^{(8–6)}, 6–7^{(4–7)}, [11–9]

=== Women's doubles ===
- (United States) Desirae Krawczyk / (Mexico) Giuliana Olmos defeated (Ukraine) Kateryna Bondarenko / (Canada) Sharon Fichman, 6–3, 7–6^{(7–5)}

== Point distribution ==
Event	W	F	SF	QF	Round of 16	Round of 32	Q	Q2	Q1
Men's singles	500	300	180	90	45	0	20	10	0
Men's doubles	500	300	180	90	0	—	45	25	0
Women's singles	280	180	110	60	30	1	18	12	1
Women's doubles	280	180	110	60	1	—	—	—	—

== ATP singles main-draw entrants ==
=== Seeds ===
Country	Player	Ranking^{1}	Seed
ESP	Rafael Nadal	2	1
GER	Alexander Zverev	7	2
SUI	Stan Wawrinka	16	3
CAN	Félix Auger-Aliassime	18	4
USA	John Isner	19	5
AUS	Nick Kyrgios	21	6
BUL	Grigor Dimitrov	22	7
SRB	Dušan Lajović	23	8

- ^{1} Rankings as of February 17, 2020.

=== Other entrants ===
The following players received wildcards into the main draw:

- (Mexico) Gerardo López Villaseñor
- (United Kingdom) Cameron Norrie
- (Germany) Mischa Zverev

The following player received entry into the singles main draw using a protected ranking:

- (United States) Mackenzie McDonald

The following player received entry as a special exempt:

- (Spain) Pedro Martínez

The following players received entry from the qualifying draw:

- (Bosnia and Herzegovina) Damir Džumhur
- (United States) Marcos Giron
- (Chinese Taipei) Jason Jung
- (United States) Tommy Paul

The following players received entry as lucky losers:

- (Australia) Alex Bolt
- (Japan) Taro Daniel

=== Withdrawals ===
Before the tournament

- (South Africa) Kevin Anderson → replaced by (South Korea) Kwon Soon-woo
- (Italy) Matteo Berrettini → replaced by (United Kingdom) Kyle Edmund
- (United States) Reilly Opelka → replaced by (Japan) Taro Daniel
- (France) Lucas Pouille → replaced by (United States) Steve Johnson
- (Australia) Jordan Thompson → replaced by (Australia) Alex Bolt

=== Retirements ===
- (Australia) Nick Kyrgios

== ATP doubles main-draw entrants ==
=== Seeds ===
Country	Player	Country	Player	Rank^{1}	Seed
COL	Juan Sebastián Cabal	COL	Robert Farah	3	1
POL	Łukasz Kubot	BRA	Marcelo Melo	17	2
ESP	Marcel Granollers	ARG	Horacio Zeballos	22	3
AUS	Max Purcell	AUS	Luke Saville	79	4

- ^{1} Rankings as of February 17, 2020.

=== Other entrants ===
The following pairs received wildcards into the doubles main draw:

- (Spain) Feliciano López / (Spain) Marc López
- (Germany) Alexander Zverev / (Germany) Mischa Zverev

The following pair received entry from the qualifying draw:

- (United States) Nicholas Monroe / (United States) Jackson Withrow

The following pair received entry as lucky losers:

- (Venezuela) Luis David Martínez / (Mexico) Miguel Ángel Reyes-Varela

=== Withdrawals ===
Before the tournament

- (Australia) Jordan Thompson

During the tournament

- (United States) Taylor Fritz

== WTA singles main-draw entrants ==
=== Seeds ===
Country	Player	Ranking^{1}	Seed
USA	Sloane Stephens	34	1
CHN	Wang Yafan	57	2
CZE	Marie Bouzková	60	3
USA	Lauren Davis	62	4
USA	Venus Williams	66	5
CHN	Zhu Lin	69	6
GBR	Heather Watson	74	7
JPN	Nao Hibino	75	8

- ^{1} Rankings as of February 17, 2020.

=== Other entrants ===
The following players received wildcards into the main draw:

- (United States) Katie Volynets
- (United States) Venus Williams
- (Mexico) Renata Zarazúa

The following players received entry into the singles main draw using a protected ranking:

- (Ukraine) Kateryna Bondarenko
- (United Kingdom) Katie Boulter
- (United States) Shelby Rogers
- (Slovakia) Anna Karolína Schmiedlová
- (United States) CoCo Vandeweghe

The following players received entry from the qualifying draw:

- (United States) Usue Maitane Arconada
- (United States) Caroline Dolehide
- (Italy) Sara Errani
- (Canada) Leylah Annie Fernandez
- (Slovenia) Kaja Juvan
- (China) Wang Xiyu

The following player received entry as a lucky loser:

- (United States) Francesca Di Lorenzo

=== Withdrawals ===
Before the tournament

- (France) Fiona Ferro → replaced by (United Kingdom) Heather Watson
- (United States) Madison Keys → replaced by (United States) Francesca Di Lorenzo
- (Ukraine) Kateryna Kozlova → replaced by (Japan) Nao Hibino
- (Sweden) Rebecca Peterson → replaced by (United States) CoCo Vandeweghe

== WTA doubles main-draw entrants ==
=== Seeds ===
Country	Player	Country	Player	Rank^{1}	Seed
ESP	Georgina García Pérez	ESP	Sara Sorribes Tormo	115	1
USA	Desirae Krawczyk	MEX	Giuliana Olmos	123	2
AUS	Ellen Perez	AUS	Storm Sanders	131	3
AUS	Monique Adamczak	USA	Maria Sanchez	152	4

- ^{1} Rankings as of February 17, 2020.

=== Other entrants ===
The following pairs received wildcards into the doubles main draw:

- (Italy) Sara Errani / (Chile) Daniela Seguel
- ~~(Mexico) Marcela Zacarías / (Mexico) Renata Zarazúa~~

The following pair received entry as alternates:

- (Netherlands) Arantxa Rus / (Slovenia) Tamara Zidanšek

=== Withdrawals ===
Before the tournament

- (Mexico) Renata Zarazúa (fatigue)

Before the tournament

- (Italy) Sara Errani (left lower leg injury)
