= 2020 Abierto Mexicano Telcel – Men's singles =

Men's singles
- 2020 Abierto Mexicano Telcel

Final
- Champion: (Spain) Rafael Nadal
- Runner-up: (United States) Taylor Fritz
- Score: 6–3, 6–2

Details
- Draw: 32 (4 Q / 3 WC )
- Seeds: 8

Events
Singles	men	women
Doubles	men	women
- Abierto Mexicano Telcel

Nick Kyrgios was the defending champion, but retired from his first round match against Ugo Humbert due to a wrist injury.

Rafael Nadal won the title, defeating Taylor Fritz in the final, 6–3, 6–2. This was the third time that Nadal won the Acapulco Open, and the first time on hard court.

== Seeds ==
1. (Spain) Rafael Nadal (champion)
2. (Germany) Alexander Zverev (second round)
3. (Switzerland) Stan Wawrinka (quarterfinals)
4. (Canada) Félix Auger-Aliassime (second round)
5. (United States) John Isner (semifinals)
6. (Australia) Nick Kyrgios (first round, retired due to a wrist injury)
7. (Bulgaria) Grigor Dimitrov (semifinals)
8. (Serbia) Dušan Lajović (second round)

== Draw ==
Key

- Q = Qualifier
- WC = Wild card
- LL = Lucky loser
- Alt = Alternate
- ITF = ITF entry
- PR = Protected ranking
- SR = Special ranking
- SE = Special exempt
- JE = Junior exempt
- JR = Junior Accelerator Programme entrant
- CO = College Accelerator Programme entrant
- NG = Next Gen Accelerator Program entrant
- w/o = Walkover
- r = Retired
- d = Defaulted

=== Finals ===
Semifinals
1	(Spain) Rafael Nadal	6	6
7	(Bulgaria) Grigor Dimitrov	3	2
(United States) Taylor Fritz	2	7	6
5	(United States) John Isner	6	5	3

Final
1	(Spain) Rafael Nadal	6	6
(United States) Taylor Fritz	3	2

=== Top half ===
First round
1	(Spain) R Nadal	6	6
(Spain) P Andújar	3	2
(Australia) A de Minaur	6	4	3
(Serbia) M Kecmanović	3	6	6
LL	(Japan) T Daniel	2	6	3
(South Korea) S-w Kwon	6	2	6
(United States) S Johnson	7^{7}	4	3
8	(Serbia) D Lajović	6^{5}	6	6
3	(Switzerland) S Wawrinka	6	6^{4}	7^{7}
(United States) F Tiafoe	3	7^{7}	6^{1}
(Moldova) R Albot	3	2
SE	(Spain) P Martínez	6	6
WC	(United Kingdom) C Norrie	6	3	3
(France) A Mannarino	2	6	6
Q	(Bosnia and Herzegovina) D Džumhur	3	3
7	(Bulgaria) G Dimitrov	6	6

Second round
1	(Spain) R Nadal	6	7
(Serbia) M Kecmanović	2	5
(South Korea) S-w Kwon	7^{7}	6
8	(Serbia) D Lajović	6^{2}	0
3	(Switzerland) S Wawrinka	6	6
SE	(Spain) P Martínez	4	4
(France) A Mannarino	7^{10}	2	6^{2}
7	(Bulgaria) G Dimitrov	6^{8}	6	7^{7}

Quarterfinals
1	(Spain) R Nadal	6	6
(South Korea) S-w Kwon	2	1
3	(Switzerland) S Wawrinka	4	4
7	(Bulgaria) G Dimitrov	6	6

Semifinals
1	(Spain) R Nadal	6	6
7	(Bulgaria) G Dimitrov	3	2

=== Bottom half ===
First round
6	(Australia) N Kyrgios	3	0^{r}
(France) U Humbert	6	0
(United States) T Fritz	7	3	6
(Australia) J Millman	5	6	1
(United Kingdom) K Edmund	6	6
(Spain) F López	4	1
LL	(Australia) A Bolt	3	6^{5}
4	(Canada) F Auger-Aliassime	6	7^{7}
5	(United States) J Isner	6	7^{7}
WC	(Germany) M Zverev	3	6^{4}
Q	(United States) M Giron	6	7^{7}
WC	(Mexico) G López Villaseñor	4	6^{3}
Q	(United States) T Paul	6^{4}	6	6
PR	(United States) M McDonald	7^{7}	4	4
Q	(Chinese Taipei) J Jung	6^{6}	1
2	(Germany) A Zverev	7^{8}	6

Second round
(France) U Humbert	4	1
(United States) T Fritz	6	6
(United Kingdom) K Edmund	6	6
4	(Canada) F Auger-Aliassime	4	4
5	(United States) J Isner	6	7^{7}
Q	(United States) M Giron	3	6^{4}
Q	(United States) T Paul	6	6
2	(Germany) A Zverev	3	4

Quarterfinals
(United States) T Fritz	6	6
(United Kingdom) K Edmund	4	3
5	(United States) J Isner	7^{7}	3	6
Q	(United States) T Paul	6^{3}	6	2

Semifinals
(United States) T Fritz	2	7	6
5	(United States) J Isner	6	5	3

== Qualifying ==
=== Seeds ===
1. (United Kingdom) Cameron Norrie (Received wildcard into main draw)
2. (United States) Tommy Paul (qualified)
3. (Japan) Taro Daniel (qualifying competition, lucky loser)
4. (Bosnia and Herzegovina) Damir Džumhur (qualified)
5. (United States) Marcos Giron (qualified)
6. (Chinese Taipei) Jason Jung (qualified)
7. (Australia) Alex Bolt (qualifying competition, lucky loser)
8. (Colombia) Daniel Elahi Galán (qualifying competition)

=== Qualifiers ===
1. (Chinese Taipei) Jason Jung
2. (United States) Tommy Paul
3. (United States) Marcos Giron
4. (Bosnia and Herzegovina) Damir Džumhur

=== Lucky losers ===
1. (Australia) Alex Bolt
2. (Japan) Taro Daniel

=== Qualifying draw ===
==== First qualifier ====
First round
Alt	(Germany) Daniel Altmaier	6	6
WC	(United States) Ryan Harrison	2	3
(Canada) Steven Diez	2	2
6	(Chinese Taipei) Jason Jung	6	6

Qualifying competition
Alt	(Germany) Daniel Altmaier	1	3
6	(Chinese Taipei) Jason Jung	6	6

==== Second qualifier ====
First round
2	(United States) Tommy Paul	7^{9}	1
(Serbia) Danilo Petrović	6^{7}	0^{r}
WC	(Mexico) Lucas Gómez	7	1	2
8	(Colombia) Daniel Elahi Galán	5	6	6

Qualifying competition
2	(United States) Tommy Paul	6	6
8	(Colombia) Daniel Elahi Galán	4	4

==== Third qualifier ====
First round
3	(Japan) Taro Daniel	6	4
Alt	(Australia) Max Purcell	3	3^{r}
WC	(Mexico) Alex Hernández	5	1
5	(United States) Marcos Giron	7	6

Qualifying competition
3	(Japan) Taro Daniel	4	7	1
5	(United States) Marcos Giron	6	5	6

==== Fourth qualifier ====
First round
4	(Bosnia and Herzegovina) Damir Džumhur	6	6
(Brazil) João Menezes	1	4
(Austria) Sebastian Ofner	6^{2}	6	6^{7}
7	(Australia) Alex Bolt	7^{7}	4	7^{9}

Qualifying competition
4	(Bosnia and Herzegovina) Damir Džumhur	6^{5}	6	6
7	(Australia) Alex Bolt	7^{7}	3	4
