= 2020 ATP Finals – Singles =

Singles
- 2020 ATP Finals

Final
- Champion: (Russia) Daniil Medvedev
- Runner-up: (Austria) Dominic Thiem
- Score: 4–6, 7–6^{(7–2)}, 6–4

Events
Singles	Doubles
- ATP Finals

Daniil Medvedev defeated Dominic Thiem in the final, 4–6, 7–6^{(7–2)}, 6–4 to win the singles tennis title at the 2020 ATP Finals. Medvedev became the fourth man to defeat the world's top-three ranked players en route to a title (after David Nalbandian, Novak Djokovic, and Boris Becker), and the first to do so since Nalbandian at the 2007 Madrid Masters.

Stefanos Tsitsipas was the defending champion, but was eliminated in the round-robin stage. This marked the first time since 2009 that the defending champion was eliminated in the round-robin stage.

Djokovic was attempting to equal Roger Federer's record of six Tour Finals titles, but was defeated by Thiem in the semifinals. His loss guaranteed a maiden ATP Finals champion for the fifth consecutive year. Rafael Nadal was attempting to become only the second man (after Andre Agassi) to complete the career Super Slam, but was defeated by Medvedev in the semifinals. Despite qualifying with the world No. 5 ranking, Federer was absent due to an ongoing knee injury.

Andrey Rublev and Diego Schwartzman made their tournament debuts.

== Seeds ==
1. (Serbia) Novak Djokovic (semifinals)
2. (Spain) Rafael Nadal (semifinals)
3. (Austria) Dominic Thiem (final)
4. (Russia) Daniil Medvedev (champion)
5. (Germany) Alexander Zverev (round robin)
6. (Greece) Stefanos Tsitsipas (round robin)
7. (Russia) Andrey Rublev (round robin)
8. (Argentina) Diego Schwartzman (round robin)

== Alternates ==
1. (Italy) Matteo Berrettini (Did not play)
2. (Canada) Denis Shapovalov (Did not play)

== Draw ==
=== Finals ===
Semifinals
4	(Russia) Daniil Medvedev	3	7^{7}	6
2	(Spain) Rafael Nadal	6	6^{4}	3
3	(Austria) Dominic Thiem	7	6^{10}	7^{7}
1	(Serbia) Novak Djokovic	5	7^{12}	6^{5}

Final
4	(Russia) Daniil Medvedev	4	7^{7}	6
3	(Austria) Dominic Thiem	6	6^{2}	4

=== Group Tokyo 1970 ===
		(Serbia) Djokovic	(Russia) Medvedev	(Germany) Zverev	(Argentina) Schwartzman	RR W–L	Set W–L	Game W–L	Standings
1	(Serbia) Novak Djokovic		3–6, 3–6	6–3, 7–6^{(7–4)}	6–3, 6–2	2–1	4–2 (67%)	31–26 (54%)	2
4	(Russia) Daniil Medvedev	6–3, 6–3		6–3, 6–4	6–3, 6–3	3–0	6–0 (100%)	36–19 (65%)	1
5	(Germany) Alexander Zverev	3–6, 6–7^{(4–7)}	3–6, 4–6		6–3, 4–6, 6–3	1–2	2–5 (29%)	32–37 (46%)	3
8	(Argentina) Diego Schwartzman	3–6, 2–6	3–6, 3–6	3–6, 6–4, 3–6		0–3	1–6 (17%)	23–40 (37%)	4

=== Group London 2020 ===
		(Spain) Nadal	(Austria) Thiem	(Greece) Tsitsipas	(Russia) Rublev	RR W–L	Set W–L	Game W–L	Standings
2	(Spain) Rafael Nadal		6–7^{(7–9)}, 6–7^{(4–7)}	6–4, 4–6, 6–2	6–3, 6–4	2–1	4–3 (57%)	40–33 (55%)	2
3	(Austria) Dominic Thiem	7–6^{(9–7)}, 7–6^{(7–4)}		7–6^{(7–5)}, 4–6, 6–3	2–6, 5–7	2–1	4–3 (57%)	38–40 (49%)	1
6	(Greece) Stefanos Tsitsipas	4–6, 6–4, 2–6	6–7^{(5–7)}, 6–4, 3–6		6–1, 4–6, 7–6^{(8–6)}	1–2	4–5 (44%)	44–46 (49%)	3
7	(Russia) Andrey Rublev	3–6, 4–6	6–2, 7–5	1–6, 6–4, 6–7^{(6–8)}		1–2	3–4 (43%)	33–36 (48%)	4

Standings are determined by: 1. number of wins; 2. number of matches; 3. in two-players-ties, head-to-head records; 4. in three-players-ties, percentage of sets won, then percentage of games won; 5. ATP rankings.
