= 2020 Wimbledon Championships =

Cancelled tennis tournament

- Date: 29 June – 12 July (cancelled)
- Edition: (completely cancelled)
- Category: Grand Slam (ITF)
- Draw: 128S / 64D / 48XD
- Surface: Grass
- Location: London, United Kingdom
- Venue: All England Lawn Tennis and Croquet Club
- Wimbledon Championships

The 2020 Wimbledon Championships was a cancelled Grand Slam tennis tournament scheduled to be played at the All England Lawn Tennis and Croquet Club in Wimbledon, London, United Kingdom, between Monday 29 June 2020 and Sunday 12 July 2020. It was never played because of the COVID-19 pandemic. The cancellation of the tournament was announced on 1 April 2020. This was the first time since World War II that the Wimbledon Championships had been cancelled.

== Cancellation and impact of the COVID-19 pandemic ==
The All England Club exercised an insurance plan covering infectious diseases, reportedly claiming over £100 million for the cancellation. £10m was distributed to the 620 players whose rankings would have been high enough for them to enter the tournament had it taken place. It was the first time the tournament had been cancelled since 1945 during World War II. Had it gone ahead, it would have been the 134th edition of the Wimbledon Championships. Novak Djokovic of Serbia and Simona Halep of Romania were the defending champions in the 2019 men's and women's singles draws. Following the cancellation, the BBC, the host broadcaster of this event since 1937, decided to air classic games as a replacement programme.

Preceded by 2019 Wimbledon Championships	The Championships, Wimbledon	Succeeded by 2021 Wimbledon Championships
