= 2019 ATP Masters 1000 tournaments =

Men's professional tennis tour

2019 ATP Masters 1000
Details
- Duration: March 7 – November 3
- Edition: 30th
- Tournaments: 9

Achievements (singles)
- Most titles: (Serbia) Novak Djokovic (Russia) Daniil Medvedev (Spain) Rafael Nadal (2)
- Most finals: (Serbia) Novak Djokovic (Russia) Daniil Medvedev (3)

The thirtieth edition of the ATP Masters Series. The champion of each Masters event is awarded 1,000 rankings points.

== Tournaments ==
Tournament	Country	Location	Surface	Prize money
Indian Wells Masters	USA	Indian Wells, California	Hard	$9,314,875
Miami Open	USA	Miami Gardens, Florida	Hard	$9,314,875
Monte-Carlo Masters	France	Roquebrune-Cap-Martin	Clay	€5,585,030
Madrid Open	Spain	Madrid	Clay	€7,279,270
Italian Open	Italy	Rome	Clay	€5,791,280
Canadian Open	Canada	Montreal	Hard	$6,338,885
Cincinnati Masters	USA	Mason, Ohio	Hard	$6,735,690
Shanghai Masters	China	Shanghai	Hard	$8,322,885
Paris Masters	France	Paris	Hard (indoor)	€5,791,280

== Results ==
* First-time champion

Masters	Singles champions	Runners-up	Score	Doubles champions	Runners-up	Score
Indian Wells Singles – Doubles	(Austria) Dominic Thiem*	(Switzerland) Roger Federer	3–6, 6–3, 7–5	(Croatia) Nikola Mektić	(Poland) Łukasz Kubot (Brazil) Marcelo Melo	4–6, 6–4, [10–3]
Indian Wells Singles – Doubles	(Austria) Dominic Thiem*	(Switzerland) Roger Federer	3–6, 6–3, 7–5	(Argentina) Horacio Zeballos*	(Poland) Łukasz Kubot (Brazil) Marcelo Melo	4–6, 6–4, [10–3]
Miami Singles – Doubles	(Switzerland) Roger Federer	(United States) John Isner	6–1, 6–4	(United States) Bob Bryan (United States) Mike Bryan	(Netherlands) Wesley Koolhof (Greece) Stefanos Tsitsipas	7–5, 7–6^{(10–8)}
Monte Carlo Singles – Doubles	(Italy) Fabio Fognini*	(Serbia) Dušan Lajović	6–3, 6–4	(Croatia) Nikola Mektić	(Netherlands) Robin Haase (Netherlands) Wesley Koolhof	6–7^{(3–7)}, 7–6^{(7–3)}, [11–9]
Monte Carlo Singles – Doubles	(Italy) Fabio Fognini*	(Serbia) Dušan Lajović	6–3, 6–4	(Croatia) Franko Škugor*	(Netherlands) Robin Haase (Netherlands) Wesley Koolhof	6–7^{(3–7)}, 7–6^{(7–3)}, [11–9]
Madrid Singles – Doubles	(Serbia) Novak Djokovic	(Greece) Stefanos Tsitsipas	6–3, 6–4	(Netherlands) Jean-Julien Rojer (Romania) Horia Tecău	(Argentina) Diego Schwartzman (Austria) Dominic Thiem	6–2, 6–3
Rome Singles – Doubles	(Spain) Rafael Nadal	(Serbia) Novak Djokovic	6–0, 4–6, 6–1	(Colombia) Juan Sebastián Cabal (Colombia) Robert Farah	(South Africa) Raven Klaasen (New Zealand) Michael Venus	6–1, 6–3
Montreal Singles – Doubles	(Spain) Rafael Nadal	(Russia) Daniil Medvedev	6–3, 6–0	(Spain) Marcel Granollers (Argentina) Horacio Zeballos	(Netherlands) Robin Haase (Netherlands) Wesley Koolhof	7–5, 7–5
Cincinnati Singles – Doubles	(Russia) Daniil Medvedev*	(Belgium) David Goffin	7–6^{(7–3)}, 6–4	(Croatia) Ivan Dodig	(Colombia) Juan Sebastián Cabal (Colombia) Robert Farah	4–6, 6–4, [10–6]
Cincinnati Singles – Doubles	(Russia) Daniil Medvedev*	(Belgium) David Goffin	7–6^{(7–3)}, 6–4	(Slovakia) Filip Polášek*	(Colombia) Juan Sebastián Cabal (Colombia) Robert Farah	4–6, 6–4, [10–6]
Shanghai Singles – Doubles	(Russia) Daniil Medvedev	(Germany) Alexander Zverev	6–4, 6–1	(Croatia) Mate Pavić*	(Poland) Łukasz Kubot (Brazil) Marcelo Melo	6–4, 6–2
Shanghai Singles – Doubles	(Russia) Daniil Medvedev	(Germany) Alexander Zverev	6–4, 6–1	(Brazil) Bruno Soares	(Poland) Łukasz Kubot (Brazil) Marcelo Melo	6–4, 6–2
Paris Singles – Doubles	(Serbia) Novak Djokovic	(Canada) Denis Shapovalov	6–3, 6–4	(France) Nicolas Mahut (France) Pierre-Hugues Herbert	(Russia) Karen Khachanov (Russia) Andrey Rublev	6–4, 6–1

== Tournament details ==
Key

- Q = Qualifier
- WC = Wild card
- LL = Lucky loser
- Alt = Alternate
- ITF = ITF entry
- PR = Protected ranking
- SR = Special ranking
- SE = Special exempt
- JE = Junior exempt
- JR = Junior Accelerator Programme entrant
- CO = College Accelerator Programme entrant
- NG = Next Gen Accelerator Program entrant
- w/o = Walkover
- r = Retired
- d = Defaulted

=== Indian Wells Masters ===
==== Singles ====
Quarterfinals
18	(France) Gaël Monfils
7	(Austria) Dominic Thiem	w/o
13	(Canada) Milos Raonic	6	6
LL	(Serbia) Miomir Kecmanović	3	4
(Poland) Hubert Hurkacz	4	4
4	(Switzerland) Roger Federer	6	6
12	(Russia) Karen Khachanov	6^{2}	6^{2}
2	(Spain) Rafael Nadal	7^{7}	7^{7}

Semifinals
7	(Austria) Dominic Thiem	7^{7}	6^{3}	6
13	(Canada) Milos Raonic	6^{3}	7^{7}	4
4	(Switzerland) Roger Federer	w/o
2	(Spain) Rafael Nadal

Final
7	(Austria) Dominic Thiem	3	6	7
4	(Switzerland) Roger Federer	6	3	5

==== Doubles ====
Semifinals
(Croatia) Nikola Mektić (Argentina) Horacio Zeballos	7^{7}	7^{7}
3	(Austria) Oliver Marach (Croatia) Mate Pavić	6^{3}	6^{3}
6	(Poland) Łukasz Kubot (Brazil) Marcelo Melo	7^{7}	2	[10]
(Serbia) Novak Djokovic (Italy) Fabio Fognini	6^{5}	6	[6]

Final
(Croatia) Nikola Mektić (Argentina) Horacio Zeballos	4	6	[10]
6	(Poland) Łukasz Kubot (Brazil) Marcelo Melo	6	4	[3]

=== Miami Open ===
==== Singles ====
Quarterfinals
22	(Spain) Roberto Bautista Agut	6^{1}	6^{5}
7	(United States) John Isner	7^{7}	7^{7}
Q	(Canada) Félix Auger-Aliassime	7^{7}	6
11	(Croatia) Borna Ćorić	6^{3}	2
6	(South Africa) Kevin Anderson	0	4
4	(Switzerland) Roger Federer	6	6
20	(Canada) Denis Shapovalov	6^{5}	6	6
28	(United States) Frances Tiafoe	7^{7}	4	2

Semifinals
7	(United States) John Isner	7^{7}	7^{7}
Q	(Canada) Félix Auger-Aliassime	6^{3}	6^{4}
4	(Switzerland) Roger Federer	6	6
20	(Canada) Denis Shapovalov	2	4

Final
7	(United States) John Isner	1	4
4	(Switzerland) Roger Federer	6	6

==== Doubles ====
Semifinals
1	(Poland) Łukasz Kubot (Brazil) Marcelo Melo	6^{7}	7^{10}	[12]
3	(United States) Bob Bryan (United States) Mike Bryan	7^{9}	6^{8}	[14]
(Croatia) Ivan Dodig (France) Édouard Roger-Vasselin	3	7^{7}	[8]
(Netherlands) Wesley Koolhof (Greece) Stefanos Tsitsipas	6	6^{2}	[10]

Final
3	(United States) Bob Bryan (United States) Mike Bryan	7	7^{10}
(Netherlands) Wesley Koolhof (Greece) Stefanos Tsitsipas	5	6^{8}

=== Monte-Carlo Masters ===
==== Singles ====
Quarterfinals
1	(Serbia) Novak Djokovic	3	6	2
10	(Russia) Daniil Medvedev	6	4	6
(Serbia) Dušan Lajović	6	7
Q	(Italy) Lorenzo Sonego	4	5
9	(Croatia) Borna Ćorić	6	3	2
13	(Italy) Fabio Fognini	1	6	6
(Argentina) Guido Pella	6^{1}	3
2	(Spain) Rafael Nadal	7^{7}	6

Semifinals
10	(Russia) Daniil Medvedev	5	1
(Serbia) Dušan Lajović	7	6
13	(Italy) Fabio Fognini	6	6
2	(Spain) Rafael Nadal	4	2

Final
(Serbia) Dušan Lajović	3	4
13	(Italy) Fabio Fognini	6	6

==== Doubles ====
Semifinals
(Netherlands) Robin Haase (Netherlands) Wesley Koolhof	7^{7}	6
3	(United Kingdom) Jamie Murray (Brazil) Bruno Soares	6^{4}	4
(Argentina) Máximo González (Argentina) Horacio Zeballos	4	3
7	(Croatia) Nikola Mektić (Croatia) Franko Škugor	6	6

Final
(Netherlands) Robin Haase (Netherlands) Wesley Koolhof	7^{7}	6^{3}	[9]
7	(Croatia) Nikola Mektić (Croatia) Franko Škugor	6^{3}	7^{7}	[11]

=== Madrid Open ===
==== Singles ====
Quarterfinals
1	(Serbia) Novak Djokovic	w/o
9	(Croatia) Marin Čilić
4	(Switzerland) Roger Federer	6	6^{11}	4
5	(Austria) Dominic Thiem	3	7^{13}	6
8	(Greece) Stefanos Tsitsipas	7	3	6
3	(Germany) Alexander Zverev	5	6	2
(Switzerland) Stan Wawrinka	1	2
2	(Spain) Rafael Nadal	6	6

Semifinals
1	(Serbia) Novak Djokovic	7^{7}	7^{7}
5	(Austria) Dominic Thiem	6^{2}	6^{4}
8	(Greece) Stefanos Tsitsipas	6	2	6
2	(Spain) Rafael Nadal	4	6	3

Final
1	(Serbia) Novak Djokovic	6	6
8	(Greece) Stefanos Tsitsipas	3	4

==== Doubles ====
Semifinals
(Netherlands) Jean-Julien Rojer (Romania) Horia Tecău	6	5	[10]
(Netherlands) Wesley Koolhof (Greece) Stefanos Tsitsipas	4	7	[5]
(Argentina) Diego Schwartzman (Austria) Dominic Thiem	6	6
(Argentina) Guido Pella (Portugal) João Sousa	3	2

Final
(Netherlands) Jean-Julien Rojer (Romania) Horia Tecău	6	6
(Argentina) Diego Schwartzman (Austria) Dominic Thiem	2	3

=== Italian Open ===
==== Singles ====
Quarterfinals
1	(Serbia) Novak Djokovic	4	7^{8}	6
7	(Argentina) Juan Martín del Potro	6	6^{6}	4
(Argentina) Diego Schwartzman	6	6
6	(Japan) Kei Nishikori	4	2
8	(Greece) Stefanos Tsitsipas	w/o
3	(Switzerland) Roger Federer
(Spain) Fernando Verdasco	4	0
2	(Spain) Rafael Nadal	6	6

Semifinals
1	(Serbia) Novak Djokovic	6	6^{2}	6
(Argentina) Diego Schwartzman	3	7^{7}	3
8	(Greece) Stefanos Tsitsipas	3	4
2	(Spain) Rafael Nadal	6	6

Final
1	(Serbia) Novak Djokovic	0	6	1
2	(Spain) Rafael Nadal	6	4	6

==== Doubles ====
Semifinals
1	(Poland) Łukasz Kubot (Brazil) Marcelo Melo	6	6^{4}	[8]
3	(Colombia) Juan Sebastián Cabal (Colombia) Robert Farah	2	7^{7}	[10]
5	(Austria) Oliver Marach (Croatia) Mate Pavić	6^{4}	6	[7]
6	(South Africa) Raven Klaasen (New Zealand) Michael Venus	7^{7}	4	[10]

Final
3	(Colombia) Juan Sebastián Cabal (Colombia) Robert Farah	6	6
6	(South Africa) Raven Klaasen (New Zealand) Michael Venus	1	3

=== Canadian Open ===
==== Singles ====
Quarterfinals
1	(Spain) Rafael Nadal	2	6	6
7	(Italy) Fabio Fognini	6	1	2
16	(France) Gaël Monfils	6	3	7^{7}
10	(Spain) Roberto Bautista Agut	4	6	6^{2}
6	(Russia) Karen Khachanov	6	6
3	(Germany) Alexander Zverev	3	3
8	(Russia) Daniil Medvedev	6	6
2	(Austria) Dominic Thiem	3	1

Semifinals
1	(Spain) Rafael Nadal	w/o
16	(France) Gaël Monfils
6	(Russia) Karen Khachanov	1	6^{6}
8	(Russia) Daniil Medvedev	6	7^{8}

Final
1	(Spain) Rafael Nadal	6	6
8	(Russia) Daniil Medvedev	3	0

==== Doubles ====
Semifinals
(Netherlands) Robin Haase (Netherlands) Wesley Koolhof	7^{7}	7^{9}
(India) Rohan Bopanna (Canada) Denis Shapovalov	6^{3}	6^{7}
(Spain) Marcel Granollers (Argentina) Horacio Zeballos	7^{9}	3	[10]
(United States) Rajeev Ram (United Kingdom) Joe Salisbury	6^{7}	6	[7]

Final
(Netherlands) Robin Haase (Netherlands) Wesley Koolhof	5	5
(Spain) Marcel Granollers (Argentina) Horacio Zeballos	7	7

=== Cincinnati Masters ===
==== Singles ====
Quarterfinals
1	(Serbia) Novak Djokovic	7^{7}	6
(France) Lucas Pouille	6^{2}	1
Q	(Russia) Andrey Rublev	2	3
9	(Russia) Daniil Medvedev	6	6
11	(Spain) Roberto Bautista Agut	6^{2}	6	2
PR	(France) Richard Gasquet	7^{7}	3	6
Q	(Japan) Yoshihito Nishioka
16	(Belgium) David Goffin	w/o

Semifinals
1	(Serbia) Novak Djokovic	6	3	3
9	(Russia) Daniil Medvedev	3	6	6
PR	(France) Richard Gasquet	3	4
16	(Belgium) David Goffin	6	6

Final
9	(Russia) Daniil Medvedev	7^{7}	6
16	(Belgium) David Goffin	6^{3}	4

==== Doubles ====
Semifinals
1	(Colombia) Juan Sebastián Cabal (Colombia) Robert Farah	6	6
6	(Croatia) Mate Pavić (Brazil) Bruno Soares	3	2
(United Kingdom) Jamie Murray (United Kingdom) Neal Skupski	1	4
(Croatia) Ivan Dodig (Slovakia) Filip Polášek	6	6

Final
1	(Colombia) Juan Sebastián Cabal (Colombia) Robert Farah	6	4	[6]
(Croatia) Ivan Dodig (Slovakia) Filip Polášek	4	6	[10]

=== Shanghai Masters ===
==== Singles ====
Quarterfinals
1	(Serbia) Novak Djokovic	6	5	3
6	(Greece) Stefanos Tsitsipas	3	7	6
3	(Russia) Daniil Medvedev	6	7^{7}
10	(Italy) Fabio Fognini	3	6^{4}
11	(Italy) Matteo Berrettini	7^{10}	6
4	(Austria) Dominic Thiem	6^{8}	4
5	(Germany) Alexander Zverev	6	6^{7}	6
2	(Switzerland) Roger Federer	3	7^{9}	3

Semifinals
6	(Greece) Stefanos Tsitsipas	6^{5}	5
3	(Russia) Daniil Medvedev	7^{7}	7
11	(Italy) Matteo Berrettini	3	4
5	(Germany) Alexander Zverev	6	6

Final
3	(Russia) Daniil Medvedev	6	6
5	(Germany) Alexander Zverev	4	1

==== Doubles ====
Semifinals
8	(Croatia) Mate Pavić (Brazil) Bruno Soares	7	6
(United Kingdom) Jamie Murray (United Kingdom) Neal Skupski	5	4
6	(France) Nicolas Mahut (France) Édouard Roger-Vasselin	2	4
2	(Poland) Łukasz Kubot (Brazil) Marcelo Melo	6	6

Final
8	(Croatia) Mate Pavić (Brazil) Bruno Soares	6	6
2	(Poland) Łukasz Kubot (Brazil) Marcelo Melo	4	2

=== Paris Masters ===
==== Singles ====
Quarterfinals
1	(Serbia) Novak Djokovic	6	6
7	(Greece) Stefanos Tsitsipas	1	2
(Chile) Cristian Garín	2	5
(Bulgaria) Grigor Dimitrov	6	7
(Canada) Denis Shapovalov	6	6
13	(France) Gaël Monfils	2	2
WC	(France) Jo-Wilfried Tsonga	6^{4}	1
2	(Spain) Rafael Nadal	7^{7}	6

Semifinals
1	(Serbia) Novak Djokovic	7^{7}	6
(Bulgaria) Grigor Dimitrov	6^{5}	4
(Canada) Denis Shapovalov	w/o
2	(Spain) Rafael Nadal

Final
1	(Serbia) Novak Djokovic	6	6
(Canada) Denis Shapovalov	3	4

==== Doubles ====
Semifinals
8	(Croatia) Ivan Dodig (Slovakia) Filip Polášek	6^{7}	6	[9]
(Russia) Karen Khachanov (Russia) Andrey Rublev	7^{9}	0	[11]
7	(France) Pierre-Hugues Herbert (France) Nicolas Mahut	7^{7}	6
5	(Germany) Kevin Krawietz (Germany) Andreas Mies	6^{1}	0

Final
(Russia) Karen Khachanov (Russia) Andrey Rublev	4	1
7	(France) Pierre-Hugues Herbert (France) Nicolas Mahut	6	6

== See also ==
- ATP Tour Masters 1000
- 2019 ATP Tour
- 2019 WTA Premier Mandatory and Premier 5 tournaments
- 2019 WTA Tour
