= 2021 Rolex Paris Masters =

- Date: 1–7 November
- Edition: 49th
- Category: ATP Tour Masters 1000
- Draw: 56S / 24D
- Prize money: €2,603,700
- Surface: Hard (indoor)
- Location: Paris, France
- Venue: Palais omnisports de Paris-Bercy

Champions

Singles
- (Serbia) Novak Djokovic

Doubles
- (Germany) Tim Pütz / (New Zealand) Michael Venus
| ← 2020 · | Paris Masters | · 2022 → |

The 2021 Rolex Paris Masters was a professional tennis tournament played on indoor hard courts. It was the 49th edition of the tournament, and a Masters 1000 event on the 2021 ATP Tour. It was held at the Palais omnisports de Paris-Bercy in Paris, France, between 1 and 7 November 2021.

== Champions ==
=== Singles ===
- (Serbia) Novak Djokovic def. (Russia) Daniil Medvedev, 4–6, 6–3, 6–3.

Djokovic won his record 37th ATP Tour Masters 1000 title.

=== Doubles ===
- (Germany) Tim Pütz / (New Zealand) Michael Venus def. (France) Pierre-Hugues Herbert / (France) Nicolas Mahut, 6–3, 6–7^{(4–7)}, [11–9]

== Points and prize money ==
=== Point distribution ===
| Event | W | F | SF | QF | Round of 16 | Round of 32 | Round of 64 | Q | Q2 | Q1 |
| Men's singles | 1000 | 600 | 360 | 180 | 90 | 45 | 10 | 25 | 16 | 0 |
| Men's doubles | 1000 | 600 | 360 | 180 | 90 | 0 | — | — | — | — |

=== Prize money ===
| Event | W | F | SF | QF | Round of 16 | Round of 32 | Round of 64 | Q2 | Q1 |
| Men's singles | €336,030 | €187,000 | €106,000 | €60,000 | €36,000 | €22,000 | €13,700 | €7,625 | €4,500 |
| Men's doubles* | €70,000 | €50,000 | €34,000 | €23,300 | €15,250 | €9,400 | — | — | — |

_{*per team}

== Singles main-draw entrants ==
=== Seeds ===
The following are the seeded players. Seedings are based on ATP rankings as of October 25, 2021. Rank and points before are as of November 1, 2021.

Because the 2020 tournament was non-mandatory, players are defending points from that tournament only if they counted towards their 19 best results as of November 1, 2021. Points from the 2019 tournament were dropped on November 1, 2021, and are accordingly not shown separately in the table.

Points from the ATP Finals (the greater of the 2019 and 2020 editions) will also be dropped at the end of the tournament. These points will not be replaced by other results.

| Seed | Rank | Player | Points before | Points dropped from 2019 or 2020 ATP Finals | Points defending (or 19th best result) | Points won | Points after | Status |
|---|---|---|---|---|---|---|---|---|
| 1 | 1 | (Serbia) Novak Djokovic | 10,340 | 400 | 0 | 1,000 | 10,940 | Champion, defeated (Russia) Daniil Medvedev [2] |
| 2 | 2 | (Russia) Daniil Medvedev | 9,540 | 1,500 | 1,000 | 600 | 7,640 | Runner-up, lost to (Serbia) Novak Djokovic [1] |
| 3 | 3 | (Greece) Stefanos Tsitsipas | 7,840 | 1,300 | (90)^{†} | 10 | 6,540^{^} | Second round retired against (Australia) Alexei Popyrin [LL] |
| 4 | 4 | (Germany) Alexander Zverev | 7,180 | 400 | 600 | 360 | 6,540 | Semifinals lost to (Russia) Daniil Medvedev [2] |
| 5 | 6 | (Russia) Andrey Rublev | 5,150 | 200 | 90 | 10 | 4,950^{^} | Second round lost to (United States) Taylor Fritz |
| 6 | 8 | (Norway) Casper Ruud | 3,670 | - | (90)^{†} | 180 | 3,760 | Quarterfinals lost to (Germany) Alexander Zverev [4] |
| 7 | 10 | (Poland) Hubert Hurkacz | 3,366 | - | (20)^{†} | 360 | 3,706 | Semifinals lost to (Serbia) Novak Djokovic [1] |
| 8 | 9 | (Italy) Jannik Sinner | 3,395 | - | (45)^{†} | 10 | 3,395^{^} | Second round lost to (Spain) Carlos Alcaraz |
| 9 | 11 | (Canada) Félix Auger-Aliassime | 3,263 | - | (45)^{†} | 45 | 3,263 | Second round lost to (Germany) Dominik Koepfer [LL] |
| 10 | 13 | (United Kingdom) Cameron Norrie | 2,900 | - | (45)^{†} | 90 | 2,945 | Third round lost to (United States) Taylor Fritz |
| 11 | 15 | (Argentina) Diego Schwartzman | 2,760 | 0 | 180 | 45 | 2,625 | Second round lost to (United States) Marcos Giron [Q] |
| 12 | 17 | (Spain) Pablo Carreño Busta | 2,365 | - | 180 | 45 | 2,230 | Second round lost to (France) Hugo Gaston [Q] |
| 13 | 16 | (Russia) Aslan Karatsev | 2,392 | - | (15)^{†} | 10 | 2,392^{^} | First round lost to (United States) Sebastian Korda |
| 14 | 20 | (Spain) Roberto Bautista Agut | 2,260 | - | (45)^{†} | 10 | 2,260^{^} | First round lost to (Australia) James Duckworth |
| 15 | 22 | (France) Gaël Monfils | 2,078 | - | (10)^{†} | 90 | 2,158 | Third round withdrew due to adductor injury |
| 16 | 30 | (Bulgaria) Grigor Dimitrov | 1,721 | - | (10)^{†} | 90 | 1,801 | Third round lost to (Germany) Alexander Zverev [4] |

† The player is not defending points from the 2020 tournament. Accordingly, his 19th best result is shown in this column instead.
^ Because the 2021 tournament is non-mandatory, the player substituted his 19th best result in place of the points won in this tournament.

=== Other entrants ===
The following players received wild cards into the main singles draw:

- (France) Richard Gasquet
- (France) Pierre-Hugues Herbert
- (United Kingdom) Andy Murray
- (France) Arthur Rinderknech

The following players received entry from the singles qualifying draw:

- ~~(United States) Jenson Brooksby~~
- (France) Hugo Gaston
- (United States) Marcos Giron
- (Serbia) Miomir Kecmanović
- (Italy) Gianluca Mager
- (United States) Tommy Paul
- (Sweden) Mikael Ymer

The following players received entry as lucky losers:

- (Germany) Dominik Koepfer
- (Italy) Lorenzo Musetti
- (Australia) Alexei Popyrin

=== Withdrawals ===
Before the tournament

- (Italy) Matteo Berrettini → replaced by (Italy) Lorenzo Musetti
- (Switzerland) Roger Federer → replaced by (Spain) Albert Ramos Viñolas
- (Chile) Cristian Garín → replaced by (France) Adrian Mannarino
- (Belgium) David Goffin → replaced by (United States) Frances Tiafoe
- (South Africa) Lloyd Harris → replaced by (Australia) Alexei Popyrin
- (France) Ugo Humbert → replaced by (Australia) John Millman
- (United States) John Isner → replaced by (Australia) James Duckworth
- (Spain) Rafael Nadal → replaced by (Belarus) Ilya Ivashka
- (Canada) Milos Raonic → replaced by (France) Benoît Paire
- (Canada) Denis Shapovalov → replaced by (United States) Mackenzie McDonald
- (Austria) Dominic Thiem → replaced by (Serbia) Laslo Đere

During the tournament

- (United States) Jenson Brooksby → replaced by (Germany) Dominik Koepfer

== Doubles main-draw entrants ==
=== Seeds ===
| Country | Player | Country | Player | Rank^{1} | Seed |
|---|---|---|---|---|---|
| CRO | Nikola Mektić | CRO | Mate Pavić | 3 | 1 |
| USA | Rajeev Ram | GBR | Joe Salisbury | 7 | 2 |
| FRA | Pierre-Hugues Herbert | FRA | Nicolas Mahut | 11 | 3 |
| ~~ESP~~ | ~~Marcel Granollers~~ | ~~ARG~~ | ~~Horacio Zeballos~~ | ~~15~~ | ~~4~~ |
| COL | Juan Sebastián Cabal | COL | Robert Farah | 25 | 5 |
| AUS | John Peers | SVK | Filip Polášek | 25 | 6 |
| GER | Kevin Krawietz | ROU | Horia Tecău | 30 | 7 |
| CRO | Ivan Dodig | BRA | Marcelo Melo | 31 | 8 |

- ^{1} Rankings are as of 25 October 2021

=== Other entrants ===
The following pairs received wildcards into the doubles main draw:

- (France) Benjamin Bonzi / (France) Arthur Rinderknech
- (Serbia) Novak Djokovic / (Serbia) Filip Krajinović

The following pairs received entry as alternates:

- (Spain) Roberto Bautista Agut / (Kazakhstan) Alexander Bublik
- (Mexico) Santiago González / (Argentina) Andrés Molteni

=== Withdrawals ===
Before the tournament

- (Canada) Félix Auger-Aliassime / (Poland) Hubert Hurkacz → replaced by (Kazakhstan) Andrey Golubev / (Russia) Aslan Karatsev
- (Chile) Cristian Garín / (Mexico) Santiago González → replaced by (Italy) Fabio Fognini / (Italy) Lorenzo Sonego
- (Spain) Marcel Granollers / (Argentina) Horacio Zeballos → replaced by (Spain) Roberto Bautista Agut / (Kazakhstan) Alexander Bublik
- (Russia) Karen Khachanov / (Russia) Andrey Rublev → (Mexico) Santiago González / (Argentina) Andrés Molteni
