= 2020 Rolex Paris Masters – Doubles =

Doubles
- 2020 Rolex Paris Masters

Final
- Champions: (Canada) Félix Auger-Aliassime (Poland) Hubert Hurkacz
- Runners-up: (Croatia) Mate Pavić (Brazil) Bruno Soares
- Score: 6–7^{(3–7)}, 7–6^{(9–7)}, [10–2]

Details
- Draw: 24
- Seeds: 8

Events
Singles	Doubles
← 2019 ·	Rolex Paris Masters	· 2021 →

Félix Auger-Aliassime and Hubert Hurkacz defeated Mate Pavić and Bruno Soares in the final, 6–7^{(3–7)}, 7–6^{(9–7)}, [10–2], to win the doubles title at the 2020 Paris Masters. They saved five championship points en route to their first doubles title as a team.

Pierre-Hugues Herbert and Nicolas Mahut were the defending champions, but lost in the quarterfinals to Łukasz Kubot and Marcelo Melo.

== Seeds ==
All seeds receive a bye into the second round.

1. (Colombia) Robert Farah / (Argentina) Horacio Zeballos (second round)
2. (Croatia) Mate Pavić / (Brazil) Bruno Soares (final)
3. (United States) Rajeev Ram / (United Kingdom) Joe Salisbury (withdrew)
4. (Poland) Łukasz Kubot / (Brazil) Marcelo Melo (semifinals)
5. (France) Pierre-Hugues Herbert / (France) Nicolas Mahut (quarterfinals)
6. (Netherlands) Wesley Koolhof / (Croatia) Nikola Mektić (quarterfinals)
7. (Australia) John Peers / (New Zealand) Michael Venus (quarterfinals)
8. (Austria) Jürgen Melzer / (France) Édouard Roger-Vasselin (semifinals)
9. (France) Fabrice Martin / (Netherlands) Jean-Julien Rojer (second round)

== Draw ==
=== Key ===
- Q = Qualifier
- WC = Wild card
- LL = Lucky loser
- Alt = Alternate
- SE = Special exempt
- PR = Protected ranking
- ITF = ITF entry
- JE = Junior exempt
- w/o = Walkover
- r = Retired
- d = Defaulted
- SR = Special ranking

=== Finals ===
Semi finals
(Canada) Félix Auger-Aliassime (Poland) Hubert Hurkacz	6	1	[10]
4	(Poland) Łukasz Kubot (Brazil) Marcelo Melo	2	6	[5]
8	(Austria) Jürgen Melzer (France) Édouard Roger-Vasselin	3	6^{4}
2	(Croatia) Mate Pavić (Brazil) Bruno Soares	6	7^{7}

Final
(Canada) Félix Auger-Aliassime (Poland) Hubert Hurkacz	6^{3}	7^{9}	[10]
2	(Croatia) Mate Pavić (Brazil) Bruno Soares	7^{7}	6^{7}	[2]

=== Top half ===
First round
WC	(France) A Mannarino (France) G Simon	1	2
(Canada) F Auger-Aliassime (Poland) H Hurkacz	6	6
(Australia) M Purcell (Australia) L Saville	3	3
(United States) A Krajicek (Croatia) F Škugor	6	6
(United Kingdom) J Murray (United Kingdom) N Skupski	7	7^{7}
Alt	(Monaco) H Nys (New Zealand) A Sitak	5	6^{5}
Alt	(El Salvador) M Arévalo (Netherlands) M Middelkoop	6	6
WC	(France) H Gaston (France) U Humbert	3	4

Second round
1	(Colombia) R Farah (Argentina) H Zeballos	3	6	[6]
(Canada) F Auger-Aliassime (Poland) H Hurkacz	6	3	[10]
(United States) A Krajicek (Croatia) F Škugor	4	6^{4}
7	(Australia) J Peers (New Zealand) M Venus	6	7^{7}
4	(Poland) Ł Kubot (Brazil) M Melo	6	1	[10]
(United Kingdom) J Murray (United Kingdom) N Skupski	2	6	[6]
Alt	(El Salvador) M Arévalo (Netherlands) M Middelkoop	3	6^{4}
5	(France) P-H Herbert (France) N Mahut	6	7^{7}

Quarterfinals
(Canada) F Auger-Aliassime (Poland) H Hurkacz	4	7	[11]
7	(Australia) J Peers (New Zealand) M Venus	6	5	[9]
4	(Poland) Ł Kubot (Brazil) M Melo	6^{4}	6	[10]
5	(France) P-H Herbert (France) N Mahut	7^{7}	3	[8]

Semifinals
(Canada) F Auger-Aliassime (Poland) H Hurkacz	6	1	[10]
4	(Poland) Ł Kubot (Brazil) M Melo	2	6	[5]

=== Bottom half ===
First round
Alt	(New Zealand) M Daniell (Austria) P Oswald	7^{7}	6
(Germany) K Krawietz (Germany) A Zverev	6^{5}	4
Alt	(Serbia) N Ćaćić (Serbia) D Lajović	5	6^{6}
(India) R Bopanna (Austria) O Marach	7	7^{8}
(South Africa) R Klaasen (Japan) B McLachlan	7^{7}	1	[5]
(United States) T Fritz (Norway) C Ruud	6^{5}	6	[10]
(Belgium) S Gillé (Belgium) J Vliegen	4	7^{7}	[10]
(Russia) D Medvedev (Germany) J-L Struff	6	6^{3}	[8]

Second round
8	(Austria) J Melzer (France) É Roger-Vasselin	6	6
Alt	(New Zealand) M Daniell (Austria) P Oswald	4	2
(India) R Bopanna (Austria) O Marach	3	6	[10]
9	(France) F Martin (Netherlands) J-J Rojer	6	4	[8]
6	(Netherlands) W Koolhof (Croatia) N Mektić	6	7^{7}
(United States) T Fritz (Norway) C Ruud	4	6^{1}
(Belgium) S Gillé (Belgium) J Vliegen	4	6^{3}
2	(Croatia) M Pavić (Brazil) B Soares	6	7^{7}

Quarterfinals
8	(Austria) J Melzer (France) É Roger-Vasselin	6	7^{8}
(India) R Bopanna (Austria) O Marach	0	6^{6}
6	(Netherlands) W Koolhof (Croatia) N Mektić	1	6^{4}
2	(Croatia) M Pavić (Brazil) B Soares	6	7^{7}

Semifinals
8	(Austria) J Melzer (France) É Roger-Vasselin	3	6^{4}
2	(Croatia) M Pavić (Brazil) B Soares	6	7^{7}
