= 2018 Rolex Paris Masters =

- Date: 29 October – 4 November
- Edition: 46th
- Category: World Tour Masters 1000
- Draw: 48S / 24D
- Prize money: €4,872,105
- Surface: Hard / indoor
- Location: Paris, France
- Venue: Palais omnisports de Paris-Bercy

Champions

Singles
- (Russia) Karen Khachanov

Doubles
- (United States) Rajeev Ram / (Spain) Marcel Granollers
← 2017 ·	Paris Masters	· 2019 →

The 2018 Rolex Paris Masters was a professional men's tennis tournament played on indoor hard courts. It was the 46th edition of the tournament, and part of the World Tour Masters 1000 category of the 2018 ATP World Tour. It took place at the Palais omnisports de Paris-Bercy in Paris, France, between 29 October and 4 November 2018.

== Points and prize money ==
=== Point distribution ===
Event	W	F	SF	QF	Round of 16	Round of 32	Round of 64	Q	Q2	Q1
Singles	1,000	600	360	180	90	45	10	25	16	0
Doubles	1,000	600	360	180	90	0	—	—	—	—

=== Prize money ===
Event	W	F	SF	QF	Round of 16	Round of 32	Round of 64	Q2	Q1
Singles	€973,480	€477,315	€240,235	€122,160	€63,435	€33,445	€18,060	€4,000	€2,035
Doubles	€289,670	€141,820	€71,130	€36,510	€18,870	€9,960	—	—	—

== Singles main-draw entrants ==
=== Seeds ===
The following are the seeded players. Seedings are based on ATP rankings as of 22 October 2018. Rankings and points before are as of 29 October 2018. Points defending include points from the 2017 ATP Finals, which will be dropped at the end of the tournament.

Seed	Rank	Player	Points before	Points defending	Points won	Points after	Status
1	1	(Spain) ~~Rafael Nadal~~	7,660	180	0	7,480	Withdrew due to abdominal injury
2	2	(Serbia) Novak Djokovic	7,445	0	600	8,045	Final lost to (Russia) Karen Khachanov
3	3	(Switzerland) Roger Federer	6,260	0+600	360	6,020	Semifinals lost to (Serbia) Novak Djokovic [2]
4	5	(Germany) Alexander Zverev	5,115	10+200	180	5,085	Quarterfinals lost to (Russia) Karen Khachanov
5	7	(Croatia) Marin Čilić	4,050	180	180	4,050	Quarterfinals lost to (Serbia) Novak Djokovic [2]
6	8	(Austria) Dominic Thiem	3,825	90+200	360	3,895	Semifinals lost to (Russia) Karen Khachanov
7	6	(South Africa) Kevin Anderson	4,230	10	90	4,310	Third round lost to (Japan) Kei Nishikori [10]
8	9	(United States) John Isner	3,425	360	90	3,155	Third round lost to (Russia) Karen Khachanov
9	10	(Bulgaria) Grigor Dimitrov	3,335	90+1,500	90	1,835	Third round lost to (Croatia) Marin Čilić [5]
10	11	(Japan) Kei Nishikori	3,210	0	180	3,390	Quarterfinals lost to (Switzerland) Roger Federer [3]
11	13	(Croatia) Borna Ćorić	2,460	70	90	2,480	Third round lost to (Austria) Dominic Thiem [6]
12	15	(United Kingdom) ~~Kyle Edmund~~	2,195	45	0	2,150	Withdrew due to left knee injury
13	14	(Italy) Fabio Fognini	2,315	(90)^{†}	90	2,315	Third round lost to (Switzerland) Roger Federer [3]
14	16	(Greece) Stefanos Tsitsipas	2,175	(90)^{‡}	10	2,095	Second round lost to (Bosnia and Herzegovina) Damir Džumhur
15	19	(Argentina) Diego Schwartzman	1,835	45	90	1,880	Third round lost to (Germany) Alexander Zverev [4]
16	23	(United States) Jack Sock	1,760	1,000+400	180	540	Quarterfinals lost to (Austria) Dominic Thiem [6]

† The player used an exemption to skip the tournament in 2017. Accordingly, points for his 18th best result are deducted instead.
‡ The player did not qualify for the tournament in 2017. Accordingly, points for his 18th best result are deducted instead.

=== Withdrawals ===
Rank	Player	Points before	Points defending	Points after	Reason
4	(Argentina) Juan Martín del Potro	5,460	180	5,300	Knee injury
12	(Belgium) David Goffin	2,675	90+800	1,765	Right shoulder injury

† del Potro is entitled to use an exemption to skip the tournament and substitute his 18th best result (20 points) in its stead.

=== Other entrants ===
The following players received wildcards into the singles main draw:

- (France) Pierre-Hugues Herbert
- (France) Ugo Humbert
- (France) Jo-Wilfried Tsonga

The following player received entry as a special exempt:

- (Kazakhstan) Mikhail Kukushkin

The following players received entry from the qualifying draw:

- (Germany) Peter Gojowczyk
- (Netherlands) Robin Haase
- (Spain) Feliciano López
- (France) Nicolas Mahut
- (France) Benoît Paire
- (Portugal) João Sousa

The following players received entry as lucky losers:

- (Australia) Matthew Ebden
- (Tunisia) Malek Jaziri

=== Withdrawals ===
Before the tournament

- (South Korea) Chung Hyeon (Right Foot Injury) → replaced by (France) Jérémy Chardy
- (Argentina) Juan Martín del Potro → replaced by (Hungary) Márton Fucsovics
- (United Kingdom) Kyle Edmund (Knee Injury) → replaced by (Australia) Matthew Ebden
- (Belgium) David Goffin → replaced by (France) Gilles Simon
- (Australia) Nick Kyrgios → replaced by (United States) Frances Tiafoe
- (Spain) Rafael Nadal (Abdominal Injury) → replaced by (Tunisia) Malek Jaziri

During the tournament

- (Hungary) Márton Fucsovics (Hip Injury)
- (Canada) Milos Raonic (Elbow Injury)

=== Retirements ===
- (Australia) Matthew Ebden (Illness)
- (Australia) John Millman (Back Injury)

== Doubles main-draw entrants ==
=== Seeds ===
Country	Player	Country	Player	Rank^{1}	Seed
AUT	Oliver Marach	CRO	Mate Pavić	5	1
USA	Mike Bryan	USA	Jack Sock	7	2
POL	Łukasz Kubot	BRA	Marcelo Melo	8	3
COL	Juan Sebastián Cabal	COL	Robert Farah	14	4
GBR	Jamie Murray	BRA	Bruno Soares	18	5
RSA	Raven Klaasen	NZL	Michael Venus	30	6
FIN	Henri Kontinen	AUS	John Peers	31	7
FRA	Pierre-Hugues Herbert	FRA	Nicolas Mahut	32	8

- ^{1} Rankings are as of 22 October 2018

=== Other entrants ===
The following pairs received wildcards into the doubles main draw:

- (France) Grégoire Barrère / (France) Adrian Mannarino
- (France) Julien Benneteau / (France) Lucas Pouille

The following pair received entry as alternates:

- (India) Divij Sharan / (New Zealand) Artem Sitak

=== Withdrawals ===
Before the tournament

- (Russia) Daniil Medvedev (Shoulder)

During the tournament

- (Croatia) Mate Pavić (Abdominal injury)

== Finals ==
=== Singles ===
- (Russia) Karen Khachanov defeated (Serbia) Novak Djokovic, 7–5, 6–4

=== Doubles ===
- (Spain) Marcel Granollers / (United States) Rajeev Ram defeated (Netherlands) Jean-Julien Rojer / (Romania) Horia Tecău, 6–4, 6–4.
