= 2019 Rolex Paris Masters =

- Date: 28 October – 3 November
- Edition: 47th
- Category: ATP Tour Masters 1000
- Draw: 48S / 32D
- Prize money: €5,207,405
- Surface: Hard / indoor
- Location: Paris, France
- Venue: AccorHotels Arena

Champions

Singles
- (Serbia) Novak Djokovic

Doubles
- (France) Pierre-Hugues Herbert / (France) Nicolas Mahut
← 2018 ·	Paris Masters	· 2020 →

The 2019 Rolex Paris Masters was a professional tennis tournament played on indoor hard courts. It was the 47th edition of the tournament, and a Masters 1000 event on the 2019 ATP Tour. It took place at the AccorHotels Arena in Paris, France, between 28 October and 3 November 2019.

== Finals ==
=== Singles ===
- (Serbia) Novak Djokovic defeated (Canada) Denis Shapovalov, 6–3, 6–4

=== Doubles ===
- (France) Pierre-Hugues Herbert / (France) Nicolas Mahut defeated (Russia) Karen Khachanov / (Russia) Andrey Rublev, 6–4, 6–1

== Points and prize money ==
=== Point distribution ===
Event	W	F	SF	QF	Round of 16	Round of 32	Round of 64	Q	Q2	Q1
Singles	1,000	600	360	180	90	45	10	25	16	0
Doubles	1,000	600	360	180	90	0	—	—	—	—

=== Prize money ===
Event	W	F	SF	QF	Round of 16	Round of 32	Round of 64	Q2	Q1
Singles	€995,720	€503,730	€259,730	€133,985	€67,025	€35,285	€19,800	€7,445	€3,725
Doubles	€284,860	€139,020	€69,680	€35,510	€18,730	€10,020	—	—	—

== Singles main-draw entrants ==
=== Seeds ===
The following are the seeded players. Seedings are based on ATP rankings as of 21 October 2019. Rankings and points before are as of 28 October 2019. Points defending include points from the 2018 ATP Finals, which will be dropped at the end of the tournament.

Seed	Rank	Player	Points before	Points defending	Points won	Points after	Status
1	1	(Serbia) Novak Djokovic	9,545	600+1,000	1,000	8,945	Champion, defeated (Canada) Denis Shapovalov
2	2	(Spain) Rafael Nadal	9,225	0	360	9,585	Semifinals withdrew due to abdominal injury
~~3~~	~~3~~	(Switzerland) ~~Roger Federer~~	6,950	360+400	0	6,190	Withdrew due to schedule change
4	4	(Russia) Daniil Medvedev	5,740	45	10	5,705	Second round lost to (France) Jérémy Chardy [Q]
5	5	(Austria) Dominic Thiem	5,495	360+200	90	5,025	Third round lost to (Bulgaria) Grigor Dimitrov
6	6	(Germany) Alexander Zverev	4,335	180+1,300	90	2,945	Third round lost to (Canada) Denis Shapovalov
7	7	(Greece) Stefanos Tsitsipas	3,830	10	180	4,000	Quarterfinals lost to (Serbia) Novak Djokovic [1]
8	8	(Russia) Karen Khachanov	2,830	1,000	10	1,840	Second round lost to (Germany) Jan-Lennard Struff
9	10	(Spain) Roberto Bautista Agut	2,575	45	10	2,540	Second round lost to (Australia) Alex de Minaur
10	9	(Italy) Matteo Berrettini	2,705	(45)^{†}	10	2,670	Second round lost to (France) Jo-Wilfried Tsonga [WC]
11	12	(Italy) Fabio Fognini	2,370	90	10	2,290	Second round lost to (Canada) Denis Shapovalov
12	14	(Belgium) David Goffin	2,325	0	10	2,335	Second round lost to (Bulgaria) Grigor Dimitrov
13	13	(France) Gaël Monfils	2,350	0	180	2,530	Quarterfinals lost to (Canada) Denis Shapovalov
14	15	(Argentina) Diego Schwartzman	2,205	90	10	2,125	Second round lost to (United Kingdom) Kyle Edmund
15	17	(United States) John Isner	1,850	90	10	1,770	Second round lost to (Chile) Cristian Garín
16	16	(Switzerland) Stan Wawrinka	1,910	0	90	2,000	Third round lost to (Spain) Rafael Nadal [2]

† The player did not qualify for the tournament in 2018. Accordingly, points for his 18th best result are deducted instead.

The following player would have been seeded, but withdrew from the event.

Rank	Player	Points before	Points defending	Points after	Reason
11	(Japan) Kei Nishikori	2,560	180+200	2,180	Right elbow injury

=== Other entrants ===
The following players received wildcards into the singles main draw:

- (France) Ugo Humbert
- (France) Adrian Mannarino
- (France) Jo-Wilfried Tsonga

The following player received entry using a protected ranking:

- ~~(France) Richard Gasquet~~

The following players received entry from the qualifying draw:

- (Lithuania) Ričardas Berankis
- (France) Jérémy Chardy
- (Japan) Yoshihito Nishioka
- (United Kingdom) Cameron Norrie
- (United States) Sam Querrey
- (Norway) Casper Ruud

The following players received entry as lucky losers:

- (Bosnia and Herzegovina) Damir Džumhur
- (France) Corentin Moutet
- (Italy) Andreas Seppi

=== Withdrawals ===
Before the tournament

- (South Africa) Kevin Anderson → replaced by (Russia) Andrey Rublev
- (Canada) Félix Auger-Aliassime → replaced by (United States) Frances Tiafoe
- (Switzerland) Roger Federer → replaced by (Italy) Andreas Seppi
- (France) Richard Gasquet → replaced by (France) Corentin Moutet
- (Australia) Nick Kyrgios → replaced by (Germany) Jan-Lennard Struff
- (Japan) Kei Nishikori → replaced by (Moldova) Radu Albot
- (Argentina) Guido Pella → replaced by (Bosnia and Herzegovina) Damir Džumhur
- (France) Lucas Pouille → replaced by (Serbia) Laslo Đere

During the tournament

- (Spain) Rafael Nadal (abdominal injury)

=== Retirements ===
- (France) Gilles Simon

== Doubles main-draw entrants ==
=== Seeds ===
Country	Player	Country	Player	Rank^{1}	Seed
COL	Juan Sebastián Cabal	COL	Robert Farah	2	1
ARG	Horacio Zeballos	ESP	Marcel Granollers	11	2
POL	Łukasz Kubot	BRA	Marcelo Melo	13	3
CRO	Mate Pavić	BRA	Bruno Soares	22	4
GER	Kevin Krawietz	GER	Andreas Mies	22	5
RSA	Raven Klaasen	NZL	Michael Venus	25	6
FRA	Pierre-Hugues Herbert	FRA	Nicolas Mahut	29	7
CRO	Ivan Dodig	SVK	Filip Polášek	43	8

- ^{1} Rankings are as of 21 October 2019

=== Other entrants ===
The following pairs received wildcards into the doubles main draw:

- (France) Elliot Benchetrit / (France) Corentin Moutet
- (France) Quentin Halys / (France) Tristan Lamasine
- (France) Adrian Mannarino / (France) Gilles Simon

The following pair received entry as alternates:

- (India) Divij Sharan / (New Zealand) Artem Sitak

=== Withdrawals ===
Before the tournament

- (Georgia (country)) Nikoloz Basilashvili
- (United States) Sam Querrey
- (France) Gilles Simon
