= 2019 WTA Premier Mandatory and Premier 5 tournaments =

Women's professional tennis tour

2019 Premier Mandatory / Premier 5
Details
- Duration: February 11 – October 6
- Edition: 30th
- Tournaments: 9

Achievements (singles)
- Most titles: (Canada) Bianca Andreescu (2)
- Most finals: (Canada) Bianca Andreescu (Australia) Ashleigh Barty (Czech Republic) Petra Kvitová (2)

The WTA Premier Mandatory and Premier 5 tournaments, which are part of the WTA Premier tournaments, make up the elite tour for professional women's tennis organised by the WTA called the WTA Tour. There are four Premier Mandatory tournaments: Indian Wells, Miami, Madrid and Beijing and five Premier 5 tournaments: Dubai, Rome, Canada, Cincinnati and Wuhan.

== Tournaments ==
Tournament	Country	Location	Surface	Date	Prize money
Dubai Tennis Championships	United Arab Emirates	Dubai	Hard	Feb 11 – 17	$2,828,000
Indian Wells Open	United States	Indian Wells	Hard	Mar 4 – 17	$9,035,428
Miami Open	United States	Key Biscayne	Hard	Mar 18 – 31	$9,035,428
Madrid Open	Spain	Madrid	Clay (red)	May 6 – 12	$7,021,128
Italian Open	Italy	Rome	Clay (red)	May 13 – 19	$3,452,538
Canadian Open	Canada	Toronto	Hard	Aug 5 – 11	$2,830,000
Cincinnati Open	United States	Mason	Hard	Aug 12 – 18	$2,944,486
Wuhan Open	China	Wuhan	Hard	Sep 23 – 29	$2,828,000
China Open	China	Beijing	Hard	Sep 30 – Oct 6	$8,285,274

== Results ==
* First-time champion

Tournament	Singles champions	Runners-up	Score	Doubles champions	Runners-up	Score
Dubai Singles – Doubles	(Switzerland) Belinda Bencic	(Czech Republic) Petra Kvitová	6–3, 1–6, 6–2	(Chinese Taipei) Hsieh Su-wei (Czech Republic) Barbora Strýcová	(Czech Republic) Lucie Hradecká (Russia) Ekaterina Makarova	6–4, 6–4
Indian Wells Singles – Doubles	(Canada) Bianca Andreescu*	(Germany) Angelique Kerber	6–4, 3–6, 6–4	(Belgium) Elise Mertens	(Czech Republic) Barbora Krejčíková (Czech Republic) Kateřina Siniaková	6–3, 6–2
Indian Wells Singles – Doubles	(Canada) Bianca Andreescu*	(Germany) Angelique Kerber	6–4, 3–6, 6–4	(Belarus) Aryna Sabalenka*	(Czech Republic) Barbora Krejčíková (Czech Republic) Kateřina Siniaková	6–3, 6–2
Miami Singles – Doubles	(Australia) Ashleigh Barty*	(Czech Republic) Karolína Plíšková	7–6^{(7–1)}, 6–3	(Belgium) Elise (2) (Belarus) Aryna Sabalenka (2)	(Australia) Samantha Stosur (China) Zhang Shuai	7–6^{(7–5)}, 6–2
Madrid Singles – Doubles	(Netherlands) Kiki Bertens	(Romania) Simona Halep	6–4, 6–4	(Chinese Taipei) Hsieh Su-wei (2) (Czech Republic) Barbora Strýcová (2)	(Canada) Gabriela Dabrowski (China) Xu Yifan	6–3, 6–1
Rome Singles – Doubles	(Czech Republic) Karolína Plíšková	(United Kingdom) Johanna Konta	6–3, 6–4	(Belarus) Victoria Azarenka (Australia) Ashleigh Barty	(Germany) Anna-Lena Grönefeld (Netherlands) Demi Schuurs	4–6, 6–0, [10–3]
Toronto Singles – Doubles	(Canada) Bianca Andreescu (2)	(United States) Serena Williams	3–1, ret.	(Czech Republic) Barbora Krejčíková* (Czech Republic) Kateřina Siniaková*	(Germany) Anna-Lena Grönefeld (Netherlands) Demi Schuurs	7–5, 6–0
Cincinnati Singles – Doubles	(United States) Madison Keys*	(Russia) Svetlana Kuznetsova	7–5, 7–6^{(7–5)}	(Czech Republic) Lucie Hradecká	(Germany) Anna-Lena Grönefeld (Netherlands) Demi Schuurs	6–4, 6–1
Cincinnati Singles – Doubles	(United States) Madison Keys*	(Russia) Svetlana Kuznetsova	7–5, 7–6^{(7–5)}	(Slovenia) Andreja Klepač*	(Germany) Anna-Lena Grönefeld (Netherlands) Demi Schuurs	6–4, 6–1
Wuhan Singles – Doubles	(Belarus) Aryna Sabalenka	(United States) Alison Riske	6–3, 3–6, 6–1	(China) Duan Yingying* (Russia) Veronika Kudermetova*	(Belgium) Elise Mertens (Belarus) Aryna Sabalenka	7–6^{(7–3)}, 6–2
Beijing Singles – Doubles	(Japan) Naomi Osaka	(Australia) Ashleigh Barty	3–6, 6–3, 6–2	(United States) Sofia Kenin*	(Latvia) Jeļena Ostapenko (Ukraine) Dayana Yastremska	6–3, 6–7^{(5–7)}, [10–7]
Beijing Singles – Doubles	(Japan) Naomi Osaka	(Australia) Ashleigh Barty	3–6, 6–3, 6–2	(United States) Bethanie Mattek-Sands	(Latvia) Jeļena Ostapenko (Ukraine) Dayana Yastremska	6–3, 6–7^{(5–7)}, [10–7]

== See also ==
- WTA Premier tournaments
- 2019 WTA Tour
- 2019 ATP Tour Masters 1000
- 2019 ATP Tour
