= 2021 Rolex Paris Masters – Singles =

Singles
- 2021 Rolex Paris Masters

Final
- Champion: (Serbia) Novak Djokovic
- Runner-up: (Russia) Daniil Medvedev
- Score: 4–6, 6–3, 6–3

Details
- Draw: 56 (7 Q / 4 WC )
- Seeds: 16

Events
Singles	Doubles
← 2020 ·	Rolex Paris Masters	· 2022 →

Novak Djokovic defeated defending champion Daniil Medvedev in the final, 4–6, 6–3, 6–3 to win the singles tennis title at the 2021 Paris Masters. It was his record-extending sixth Paris Masters title and record-breaking 37th Masters 1000 title overall, surpassing Rafael Nadal's tally. With his victory over Hubert Hurkacz in the semifinals, Djokovic also secured the year-end ATP No. 1 singles ranking for a seventh time, surpassing Pete Sampras' record.

The second-round match between Carlos Alcaraz and Jannik Sinner marked their first encounter at the ATP Tour level or higher. Alcaraz upset Sinner in two close sets.

== Seeds ==
The top eight seeds received a bye into the second round.

1. (Serbia) Novak Djokovic (champion)
2. (Russia) Daniil Medvedev (final)
3. (Greece) Stefanos Tsitsipas (second round, retired)
4. (Germany) Alexander Zverev (semifinals)
5. (Russia) Andrey Rublev (second round)
6. (Norway) Casper Ruud (quarterfinals)
7. (Poland) Hubert Hurkacz (semifinals)
8. (Italy) Jannik Sinner (second round)

9. (Canada) Félix Auger-Aliassime (second round)
10. (United Kingdom) Cameron Norrie (third round)
11. (Argentina) Diego Schwartzman (second round)
12. (Spain) Pablo Carreño Busta (second round)
13. (Russia) Aslan Karatsev (first round)
14. (Spain) Roberto Bautista Agut (first round)
15. (France) Gaël Monfils (third round, withdrew)
16. (Bulgaria) Grigor Dimitrov (third round)

Click on the seed number of a player to go to their draw section.

== Draw ==
=== Key ===
- Q = Qualifier
- WC = Wild card
- LL = Lucky loser
- Alt = Alternate
- ITF = ITF entry
- PR = Protected ranking
- SR = Special ranking
- SE = Special exempt
- JE = Junior exempt
- JR = Junior Accelerator Programme entrant
- CO = College Accelerator Programme entrant
- NG = Next Gen Accelerator Program entrant
- w/o = Walkover
- r = Retired
- d = Defaulted

=== Finals ===
Quarterfinals
1	(Serbia) Novak Djokovic	6	6
(United States) Taylor Fritz	4	3
(Australia) James Duckworth	2	7^{7}	5
7	(Poland) Hubert Hurkacz	6	6^{4}	7
6	(Norway) Casper Ruud	5	4
4	(Germany) Alexander Zverev	7	6
Q	(France) Hugo Gaston	6^{7}	4
2	(Russia) Daniil Medvedev	7^{9}	6

Semifinals
1	(Serbia) Novak Djokovic	3	6	7^{7}
7	(Poland) Hubert Hurkacz	6	0	6^{5}
4	(Germany) Alexander Zverev	2	2
2	(Russia) Daniil Medvedev	6	6

Final
1	(Serbia) Novak Djokovic	4	6	6
2	(Russia) Daniil Medvedev	6	3	3

=== Top half ===
==== Section 1 ====
First round
(Hungary) M Fucsovics	6	6^{6}	7^{7}
(Italy) F Fognini	1	7^{8}	6^{5}
(France) A Mannarino	6	6
(Georgia (country)) N Basilashvili	2	4
Q	(Serbia) M Kecmanović	6	5	3
15	(France) G Monfils	4	7	6
10	(United Kingdom) C Norrie	6	6
(Argentina) F Delbonis	2	1
(Serbia) F Krajinović	3	6^{4}
(United States) R Opelka	6	7^{7}
(Italy) L Sonego	6	2	3
(United States) T Fritz	3	6	6

Second round
1	(Serbia) N Djokovic	6	4	6
(Hungary) M Fucsovics	2	6	3
(France) A Mannarino	6	6^{4}	2
15	(France) G Monfils	2	7^{7}	6
10	(United Kingdom) C Norrie	6	6
(United States) R Opelka	3	4
(United States) T Fritz	7	7^{7}
5	(Russia) A Rublev	5	6^{2}

Third round
1	(Serbia) N Djokovic	w/o
15	(France) G Monfils
10	(United Kingdom) C Norrie	3	6^{3}
(United States) T Fritz	6	7^{7}

Quarterfinals
1	(Serbia) N Djokovic	6	6
(United States) T Fritz	4	3

==== Section 2 ====
First round
LL	(Australia) A Popyrin	6	6
(Australia) A de Minaur	0	3
(Serbia) L Đere	6	6^{5}	4
LL	(Italy) L Musetti	4	7^{7}	6
(Australia) J Duckworth	6	5	7^{7}
14	(Spain) R Bautista Agut	4	7	6^{4}
9	(Canada) F Auger-Aliassime	4	6	6
Q	(Italy) G Mager	6	4	1
WC	(United Kingdom) A Murray	4	7	6^{9}
LL	(Germany) D Koepfer	6	5	7^{11}
Q	(United States) T Paul	6	6
(Germany) J-L Struff	3	4

Second round
3	(Greece) S Tsitsipas	2^{r}
LL	(Australia) A Popyrin	4
LL	(Italy) L Musetti	3	6	3
(Australia) J Duckworth	6	3	6
9	(Canada) F Auger-Aliassime	3	5
LL	(Germany) D Koepfer	6	7
Q	(United States) T Paul	5	6^{4}
7	(Poland) H Hurkacz	7	7^{7}

Third round
LL	(Australia) A Popyrin	6^{6}	4
(Australia) J Duckworth	7^{8}	6
LL	(Germany) D Koepfer	6	5	2
7	(Poland) H Hurkacz	4	7	6

Quarterfinals
(Australia) J Duckworth	2	7^{7}	5
7	(Poland) H Hurkacz	6	6^{4}	7

=== Bottom half ===
==== Section 3 ====
First round
(Kazakhstan) A Bublik	2	7	7
(United Kingdom) D Evans	6	5	5
(United States) F Tiafoe	7^{7}	4	3
Q	(United States) M Giron	6^{5}	6	6
(Australia) J Millman	6^{2}	7	2
11	(Argentina) D Schwartzman	7^{7}	5	6
16	(Bulgaria) G Dimitrov	6	4	6
WC	(France) R Gasquet	1	6	2
(Russia) K Khachanov	6	7
Q	(Sweden) M Ymer	4	5
(Serbia) D Lajović	6	6
(United States) M McDonald	3	4

Second round
6	(Norway) C Ruud	6	6
(Kazakhstan) A Bublik	4	0
Q	(United States) M Giron	7^{7}	7^{7}
11	(Argentina) D Schwartzman	6^{2}	6^{4}
16	(Bulgaria) G Dimitrov	4	6	6
(Russia) K Khachanov	6	2	0
(Serbia) D Lajović	3	6^{5}
4	(Germany) A Zverev	6	7^{7}

Third round
6	(Norway) C Ruud	6	6
Q	(United States) M Giron	2	1
16	(Bulgaria) G Dimitrov	6^{4}	7^{7}	3
4	(Germany) A Zverev	7^{7}	6^{3}	6

Quarterfinals
6	(Norway) C Ruud	5	4
4	(Germany) A Zverev	7	6

==== Section 4 ====
First round
WC	(France) P-H Herbert	7^{7}	6^{2}	5
(Spain) C Alcaraz	6^{4}	7^{7}	7
Q	(France) H Gaston	4	6	6
WC	(France) A Rinderknech	6	4	3
(France) B Paire	3	4
12	(Spain) P Carreño Busta	6	6
13	(Russia) A Karatsev	2	7^{11}	6^{5}
(United States) S Korda	6	6^{9}	7^{7}
(Croatia) M Čilić	6	6
(Spain) A Davidovich Fokina	3	4
(Belarus) I Ivashka	6	7^{7}
(Spain) A Ramos Viñolas	3	6^{2}

Second round
8	(Italy) J Sinner	6^{1}	5
(Spain) C Alcaraz	7^{7}	7
Q	(France) H Gaston	6^{3}	6	7
12	(Spain) P Carreño Busta	7^{7}	4	5
(United States) S Korda	6	6
(Croatia) M Čilić	2	4
(Belarus) I Ivashka	5	4
2	(Russia) D Medvedev	7	6

Third round
(Spain) C Alcaraz	4	5
Q	(France) H Gaston	6	7
(United States) S Korda	6	1	3
2	(Russia) D Medvedev	4	6	6

Quarterfinals
Q	(France) H Gaston	6^{7}	4
2	(Russia) D Medvedev	7^{9}	6

== Qualifying ==
=== Seeds ===
1. (United States) Tommy Paul (qualified)
2. (Spain) Pedro Martínez (first round)
3. (United States) Jenson Brooksby (qualified, withdrew)
4. (United States) Marcos Giron (qualified)
5. (South Africa) Kevin Anderson (first round)
6. (Germany) Dominik Koepfer (qualifying competition, lucky loser)
7. (France) Benjamin Bonzi (first round)
8. (Italy) Lorenzo Musetti (qualifying competition, lucky loser)
9. (Italy) Gianluca Mager (qualified)
10. (Finland) Emil Ruusuvuori (withdrew)
11. (Serbia) Miomir Kecmanović (qualified)
12. (Argentina) Federico Coria (first round)
13. (Australia) Alexei Popyrin (qualifying competition, lucky loser)
14. (Spain) Roberto Carballés Baena (qualifying competition)

=== Qualifiers ===
1. (United States) Tommy Paul
2. (Sweden) Mikael Ymer
3. ~~(United States) Jenson Brooksby~~
4. (United States) Marcos Giron
5. (France) Hugo Gaston
6. (Serbia) Miomir Kecmanović
7. (Italy) Gianluca Mager

=== Lucky losers ===
1. (Italy) Lorenzo Musetti
2. (Germany) Dominik Koepfer
3. (Australia) Alexei Popyrin

=== Qualifying draw ===
==== First qualifier ====
First round
1	(United States) Tommy Paul	7	4	6
(Italy) Stefano Travaglia	5	6	2
WC	(France) Arthur Fils	6^{6}	2
13	(Australia) Alexei Popyrin	7^{8}	6

Qualifying competition
1	(United States) Tommy Paul	4	6	6
13	(Australia) Alexei Popyrin	6	4	3

==== Second qualifier ====
First round
2	(Spain) Pedro Martínez	5	3
(Italy) Andreas Seppi	7	6
(Sweden) Mikael Ymer	6^{3}	6	6
Alt	(Spain) Carlos Taberner	7^{7}	3	3

Qualifying competition
(Italy) Andreas Seppi	2	1
(Sweden) Mikael Ymer	6	6

==== Third qualifier ====
First round
3	(United States) Jenson Brooksby	6	4	7^{7}
(Germany) Peter Gojowczyk	3	6	6^{4}
WC	(France) Luca Van Assche	2	6^{3}
14	(Spain) Roberto Carballés Baena	6	7^{7}

Qualifying competition
3	(United States) Jenson Brooksby	5	6	6
14	(Spain) Roberto Carballés Baena	7	4	3

==== Fourth qualifier ====
First round
4	(United States) Marcos Giron	6^{4}	6	7
PR	(France) Gilles Simon	7^{7}	4	5
(Slovakia) Norbert Gombos	2	7	6
12	(Argentina) Federico Coria	6	5	1

Qualifying competition
4	(United States) Marcos Giron	6	7
(Slovakia) Norbert Gombos	1	5

==== Fifth qualifier ====
First round
5	(South Africa) Kevin Anderson	6^{13}	6	6^{1}
(France) Hugo Gaston	7^{15}	2	7^{7}
WC	(France) Lucas Pouille	6	4	1
8	(Italy) Lorenzo Musetti	4	6	6

Qualifying competition
(France) Hugo Gaston	3	6	6
8	(Italy) Lorenzo Musetti	6	3	4

==== Sixth qualifier ====
First round
6	(Germany) Dominik Koepfer	3	6	7
WC	(France) Harold Mayot	6	0	5
(Belarus) Egor Gerasimov	2	6^{3}
11	(Serbia) Miomir Kecmanović	6	7^{7}

Qualifying competition
6	(Germany) Dominik Koepfer	3	0
11	(Serbia) Miomir Kecmanović	6	6

==== Seventh qualifier ====
First round
7	(France) Benjamin Bonzi	4	6^{4}
(Japan) Yoshihito Nishioka	6	7^{7}
(Switzerland) Henri Laaksonen	4	6	3
9	(Italy) Gianluca Mager	6	3	6

Qualifying competition
(Japan) Yoshihito Nishioka	6	1	2
9	(Italy) Gianluca Mager	3	6	6
