= 2018 Rolex Paris Masters – Doubles =

Doubles
- 2018 Rolex Paris Masters

Final
- Champions: (Spain) Marcel Granollers (United States) Rajeev Ram
- Runners-up: (Netherlands) Jean-Julien Rojer (Romania) Horia Tecău
- Score: 6–4, 6–4

Details
- Draw: 24
- Seeds: 8

Events
Singles	Doubles
← 2017 ·	Rolex Paris Masters	· 2019 →

Łukasz Kubot and Marcelo Melo were the defending champions, but lost in the quarterfinals to Marcel Granollers and Rajeev Ram.

Granollers and Ram won the title, defeating Jean-Julien Rojer and Horia Tecău in the final, 6–4, 6–4.

== Seeds ==
All seeds received a bye into the second round.

1. (Austria) Oliver Marach / (Croatia) Mate Pavić (semifinals, withdrew)
2. (United States) Mike Bryan / (United States) Jack Sock (semifinals)
3. (Poland) Łukasz Kubot / (Brazil) Marcelo Melo (quarterfinals)
4. (Colombia) Juan Sebastián Cabal / (Colombia) Robert Farah (second round)
5. (United Kingdom) Jamie Murray / (Brazil) Bruno Soares (second round)
6. (South Africa) Raven Klaasen / (New Zealand) Michael Venus (quarterfinals)
7. (Finland) Henri Kontinen / (Australia) John Peers (second round)
8. (France) Pierre-Hugues Herbert / (France) Nicolas Mahut (quarterfinals)

== Draw ==
=== Key ===
- Q = Qualifier
- WC = Wild card
- LL = Lucky loser
- Alt = Alternate
- SE = Special exempt
- PR = Protected ranking
- ITF = ITF entry
- JE = Junior exempt
- w/o = Walkover
- r = Retired
- d = Defaulted
- SR = Special ranking

=== Finals ===
Semifinals
1	(Austria) Oliver Marach (Croatia) Mate Pavić
(Spain) Marcel Granollers (United States) Rajeev Ram	w/o
(Netherlands) Jean-Julien Rojer (Romania) Horia Tecău	6	7
2	(United States) Mike Bryan (United States) Jack Sock	1	5

Final
(Spain) Marcel Granollers (United States) Rajeev Ram	6	6
(Netherlands) Jean-Julien Rojer (Romania) Horia Tecău	4	4

=== Top half ===
First round
(India) R Bopanna (France) É Roger-Vasselin	7^{7}	5	[10]
(Netherlands) R Haase (Netherlands) M Middelkoop	6^{3}	7	[5]
(Georgia (country)) N Basilashvili (Netherlands) W Koolhof	2	3
(United States) J Isner (United Kingdom) N Skupski	6	6
(Pakistan) A-u-H Qureshi (Greece) S Tsitsipas	7^{9}	6
WC	(France) G Barrère (France) A Mannarino	6^{7}	4
(Spain) M Granollers (United States) R Ram	6	6
(Argentina) M González (Argentina) D Schwartzman	3	4

Second round
1	(Austria) O Marach (Croatia) M Pavić	7^{11}	6
(India) R Bopanna (France) É Roger-Vasselin	6^{9}	3
(United States) J Isner (United Kingdom) N Skupski	6	7
7	(Finland) H Kontinen (Australia) J Peers	4	5
3	(Poland) Ł Kubot (Brazil) M Melo	5	6	[10]
(Pakistan) A-u-H Qureshi (Greece) S Tsitsipas	7	2	[7]
(Spain) M Granollers (United States) R Ram	6	6
5	(United Kingdom) J Murray (Brazil) B Soares	3	3

Quarterfinals
1	(Austria) O Marach (Croatia) M Pavić	7^{8}	6^{4}	[12]
(United States) J Isner (United Kingdom) N Skupski	6^{6}	7^{7}	[10]
3	(Poland) Ł Kubot (Brazil) M Melo	1	4
(Spain) M Granollers (United States) R Ram	6	6

Semifinals
1	(Austria) O Marach (Croatia) M Pavić
(Spain) M Granollers (United States) R Ram	w/o

=== Bottom half ===
First round
WC	(France) J Benneteau (France) L Pouille	4	4
(United States) A Krajicek (Croatia) N Mektić	6	6
(Netherlands) J-J Rojer (Romania) H Tecău	7^{7}	6
(Bulgaria) G Dimitrov (Italy) F Fognini	6^{3}	4
(Japan) B McLachlan (Germany) J-L Struff	3	4
(United Kingdom) D Inglot (Croatia) F Škugor	6	6
Alt	(India) D Sharan (New Zealand) A Sitak	6	6
(Spain) F López (Spain) M López	4	3

Second round
6	(South Africa) R Klaasen (New Zealand) M Venus	3	6	[10]
(United States) A Krajicek (Croatia) N Mektić	6	4	[5]
(Netherlands) J-J Rojer (Romania) H Tecău	7^{7}	5	[10]
4	(Colombia) JS Cabal (Colombia) R Farah	6^{5}	7	[8]
8	(France) P-H Herbert (France) N Mahut	6	7
(United Kingdom) D Inglot (Croatia) F Škugor	3	5
Alt	(India) D Sharan (New Zealand) A Sitak	4	3
2	(United States) M Bryan (United States) J Sock	6	6

Quarterfinals
6	(South Africa) R Klaasen (New Zealand) M Venus	6^{4}	0
(Netherlands) J-J Rojer (Romania) H Tecău	7^{7}	6
8	(France) P-H Herbert (France) N Mahut	6	6^{5}	[6]
2	(United States) M Bryan (United States) J Sock	3	7^{7}	[10]

Semifinals
(Netherlands) J-J Rojer (Romania) H Tecău	6	7
2	(United States) M Bryan (United States) J Sock	1	5
