= 2020 Rolex Paris Masters =

- Date: 2–8 November
- Edition: 48th
- Category: ATP Tour Masters 1000
- Draw: 56S / 24D
- Prize money: €3,151,145
- Surface: Hard / indoor
- Location: Paris, France
- Venue: Palais omnisports de Paris-Bercy

Champions

Singles
- (Russia) Daniil Medvedev

Doubles
- (Canada) Félix Auger-Aliassime / (Poland) Hubert Hurkacz
← 2019 ·	Paris Masters	· 2021 →

The 2020 Rolex Paris Masters was a professional tennis tournament played on indoor hard courts. It was the 48th edition of the tournament, and a Masters 1000 event on the 2020 ATP Tour.

Due to the COVID-19 pandemic in France, it took place with no fans. It was held at the Palais omnisports de Paris-Bercy in Paris, France, between 2 and 8 November 2020.

== Champions ==
=== Singles ===
- (Russia) Daniil Medvedev def. (Germany) Alexander Zverev, 5–7, 6–4, 6–1.

=== Doubles ===
- (Canada) Félix Auger-Aliassime / (Poland) Hubert Hurkacz def. (Croatia) Mate Pavić / (Brazil) Bruno Soares, 6–7^{(3–7)}, 7–6^{(9–7)}, [10–2].

== Singles main-draw entrants ==
=== Seeds ===
Country	Player	Rank^{1}	Seed
ESP	Rafael Nadal	2	1
GRE	Stefanos Tsitsipas	5	2
RUS	Daniil Medvedev	6	3
GER	Alexander Zverev	7	4
RUS	Andrey Rublev	8	5
ARG	Diego Schwartzman	9	6
ITA	Matteo Berrettini	10	7
BEL	David Goffin	14	8
ESP	Pablo Carreño Busta	15	9
CAN	Milos Raonic	17	10
RUS	Karen Khachanov	18	11
SUI	Stan Wawrinka	19	12
~~BUL~~	~~Grigor Dimitrov~~	~~20~~	~~13~~
CAN	Félix Auger-Aliassime	21	14
CRO	Borna Ćorić	24	15
AUS	Alex de Minaur	25	16

^{1} Rankings are as of 26 October 2020

=== Other entrants ===
The following players received wild cards into the main singles draw:

- (France) Benjamin Bonzi
- (France) Hugo Gaston
- (France) Pierre-Hugues Herbert
- (France) Corentin Moutet

The following player received entry using a special exempt into the main singles draw:

- (South Africa) Kevin Anderson

The following players received entry from the singles qualifying draw:

- (Italy) Marco Cecchinato
- (Spain) Alejandro Davidovich Fokina
- (Argentina) Federico Delbonis
- (Hungary) Márton Fucsovics
- (United States) Marcos Giron
- (Slovakia) Norbert Gombos
- (Italy) Stefano Travaglia

The following players received entry as lucky losers:

- (Moldova) Radu Albot
- (Italy) Salvatore Caruso
- (Argentina) Federico Coria
- (Serbia) Laslo Đere

=== Withdrawals ===
- (Spain) Roberto Bautista Agut → replaced by (United States) Tommy Paul
- (Bulgaria) Grigor Dimitrov → replaced by (Moldova) Radu Albot
- (Serbia) Novak Djokovic → replaced by (Spain) Feliciano López
- (United Kingdom) Kyle Edmund → replaced by (Slovenia) Aljaž Bedene
- (Italy) Fabio Fognini → replaced by (Spain) Pablo Andújar
- (Chile) Cristian Garín → replaced by (Italy) Salvatore Caruso
- (United States) John Isner → replaced by (United States) Tennys Sandgren
- (Australia) Nick Kyrgios → replaced by (Italy) Lorenzo Sonego
- (France) Gaël Monfils → replaced by (Australia) Jordan Thompson
- (Japan) Kei Nishikori → replaced by (France) Gilles Simon
- (United States) Reilly Opelka → replaced by (Kazakhstan) Alexander Bublik
- (France) Benoît Paire → replaced by (Argentina) Federico Coria
- (Argentina) Guido Pella → replaced by (France) Richard Gasquet
- (Canada) Denis Shapovalov → replaced by (Japan) Yoshihito Nishioka
- (Austria) Dominic Thiem → replaced by (Serbia) Laslo Đere

== Doubles main-draw entrants ==
=== Seeds ===
Country	Player	Country	Player	Rank^{1}	Seed
COL	Robert Farah	ARG	Horacio Zeballos	4	1
CRO	Mate Pavić	BRA	Bruno Soares	11	2
~~USA~~	~~Rajeev Ram~~	~~GBR~~	~~Joe Salisbury~~	~~17~~	~~3~~
POL	Łukasz Kubot	BRA	Marcelo Melo	24	4
FRA	Pierre-Hugues Herbert	FRA	Nicolas Mahut	25	5
NED	Wesley Koolhof	CRO	Nikola Mektić	27	6
AUS	John Peers	NZL	Michael Venus	34	7
AUT	Jürgen Melzer	FRA	Édouard Roger-Vasselin	47	8
FRA	Fabrice Martin	NED	Jean-Julien Rojer	48	9

- ^{1} Rankings are as of 26 October 2020

=== Other entrants ===
The following pairs received wildcards into the doubles main draw:

- (France) Hugo Gaston / (France) Ugo Humbert
- (France) Adrian Mannarino / (France) Gilles Simon

The following pairs received entry into the doubles main draw as alternates:

- (El Salvador) Marcelo Arévalo / (Netherlands) Matwé Middelkoop
- (Serbia) Nikola Ćaćić / (Serbia) Dušan Lajović
- (New Zealand) Marcus Daniell / (Austria) Philipp Oswald
- (Monaco) Hugo Nys / (New Zealand) Artem Sitak
