= 2021 Rolex Paris Masters – Doubles =

Doubles
- 2021 Rolex Paris Masters

Final
- Champions: (Germany) Tim Pütz (New Zealand) Michael Venus
- Runners-up: (France) Pierre-Hugues Herbert (France) Nicolas Mahut
- Score: 6–3, 6–7^{(4–7)}, [11–9]

Details
- Draw: 24
- Seeds: 8

Events
Singles	Doubles
- Rolex Paris Masters

Tim Pütz and Michael Venus defeated Pierre-Hugues Herbert and Nicolas Mahut in the final, 6–3, 6–7^{(4–7)}, [11–9], to win the doubles title at the 2021 Paris Masters.

Félix Auger-Aliassime and Hubert Hurkacz were the defending champions, but chose not to participate this year.

== Seeds ==
All seeds received a bye into the second round.

1. (Croatia) Nikola Mektić / (Croatia) Mate Pavić (second round)
2. (United States) Rajeev Ram / (United Kingdom) Joe Salisbury (second round)
3. (France) Pierre-Hugues Herbert / (France) Nicolas Mahut (final)
4. (Spain) Marcel Granollers / (Argentina) Horacio Zeballos (withdrew)
5. (Colombia) Juan Sebastián Cabal / (Colombia) Robert Farah (quarterfinals)
6. (Australia) John Peers / (Slovakia) Filip Polášek (semifinals)
7. (Germany) Kevin Krawietz / (Romania) Horia Tecău (second round)
8. (Croatia) Ivan Dodig / (Brazil) Marcelo Melo (second round)

== Draw ==
Key

- Q = Qualifier
- WC = Wild card
- LL = Lucky loser
- Alt = Alternate
- ITF = ITF entry
- PR = Protected ranking
- SR = Special ranking
- SE = Special exempt
- JE = Junior exempt
- JR = Junior Accelerator Programme entrant
- CO = College Accelerator Programme entrant
- NG = Next Gen Accelerator Program entrant
- w/o = Walkover
- r = Retired
- d = Defaulted

=== Finals ===
Semifinals
6	(Australia) John Peers (Slovakia) Filip Polášek	6	3	[9]
3	(France) Pierre-Hugues Herbert (France) Nicolas Mahut	2	6	[11]
(United Kingdom) Jamie Murray (Brazil) Bruno Soares	5	3
(Germany) Tim Pütz (New Zealand) Michael Venus	7	6

Final
3	(France) Pierre-Hugues Herbert (France) Nicolas Mahut	3	7^{7}	[9]
(Germany) Tim Pütz (New Zealand) Michael Venus	6	6^{4}	[11]

=== Top half ===
First round
(Belgium) S Gillé (Belgium) J Vliegen	7^{7}	6
(Italy) S Bolelli (Argentina) M González	6^{2}	4
(Australia) A de Minaur (Australia) L Saville	6	4	[7]
WC	(Serbia) N Djokovic (Serbia) F Krajinović	4	6	[10]
(South Africa) R Klaasen (Japan) B McLachlan	7^{7}	6^{3}	[6]
(Uruguay) A Behar (Ecuador) G Escobar	6^{1}	7^{7}	[10]
WC	(France) B Bonzi (France) A Rinderknech	7^{7}	6
(Pakistan) A-u-H Qureshi (Greece) S Tsitsipas	6^{3}	4

Second round
1	(Croatia) N Mektić (Croatia) M Pavić	3	6^{6}
(Belgium) S Gillé (Belgium) J Vliegen	6	7^{8}
WC	(Serbia) N Djokovic (Serbia) F Krajinović	6^{2}	4
6	(Australia) J Peers (Slovakia) F Polášek	7^{7}	6
3	(France) P-H Herbert (France) N Mahut	7^{8}	6
(Uruguay) A Behar (Ecuador) G Escobar	6^{6}	4
WC	(France) B Bonzi (France) A Rinderknech	6	6^{5}	[12]
8	(Croatia) I Dodig (Brazil) M Melo	4	7^{7}	[10]

Quarterfinals
(Belgium) S Gillé (Belgium) J Vliegen	5	0^{r}
6	(Australia) J Peers (Slovakia) F Polášek	7	3
3	(France) P-H Herbert (France) N Mahut	6	7^{7}
WC	(France) B Bonzi (France) A Rinderknech	3	6^{3}

Semifinals
6	(Australia) J Peers (Slovakia) F Polášek	6	3	[9]
3	(France) P-H Herbert (France) N Mahut	2	6	[11]

=== Bottom half ===
First round
(Kazakhstan) A Golubev (Russia) A Karatsev	3	4
(United Kingdom) D Evans (United Kingdom) N Skupski	6	6
Alt	(Mexico) S González (Argentina) A Molteni	6^{2}	2
(United Kingdom) J Murray (Brazil) B Soares	7^{7}	6
PR	(France) F Martin (Germany) A Mies	6	7
(Netherlands) W Koolhof (Netherlands) J-J Rojer	3	5
(Italy) F Fognini (Italy) L Sonego	6^{5}	4
(Germany) T Pütz (New Zealand) M Venus	7^{7}	6

Second round
5	(Colombia) JS Cabal (Colombia) R Farah	7^{8}	7
(United Kingdom) D Evans (United Kingdom) N Skupski	6^{6}	5
(United Kingdom) J Murray (Brazil) B Soares	6	6
Alt	(Spain) R Bautista Agut (Kazakhstan) A Bublik	1	3
7	(Germany) K Krawietz (Romania) H Tecău	3	3
PR	(France) F Martin (Germany) A Mies	6	6
(Germany) T Pütz (New Zealand) M Venus	7^{14}	7^{8}
2	(United States) R Ram (United Kingdom) J Salisbury	6^{12}	6^{6}

Quarterfinals
5	(Colombia) JS Cabal (Colombia) R Farah	1	5
(United Kingdom) J Murray (Brazil) B Soares	6	7
PR	(France) F Martin (Germany) A Mies	5	5
(Germany) T Pütz (New Zealand) M Venus	7	7

Semifinals
(United Kingdom) J Murray (Brazil) B Soares	5	3
(Germany) T Pütz (New Zealand) M Venus	7	6
