= 2020 Rolex Paris Masters – Singles =

Singles
- 2020 Rolex Paris Masters

Final
- Champion: (Russia) Daniil Medvedev
- Runner-up: (Germany) Alexander Zverev
- Score: 5–7, 6–4, 6–1

Details
- Draw: 56 (7 Q / 4 WC )
- Seeds: 16

Events
Singles	Doubles
← 2019 ·	Rolex Paris Masters	· 2021 →

Daniil Medvedev defeated Alexander Zverev in the final, 5–7, 6–4, 6–1 to win the singles tennis title at the 2020 Paris Masters.

Novak Djokovic was the defending champion, but did not participate this year.

Rafael Nadal's victory over Feliciano López in the second round made him only the fourth man in the Open Era to have won 1,000 matches on the ATP Tour. His loss to Zverev in the semifinals meant that Djokovic secured the year-end ATP No. 1 singles ranking for the sixth time, equaling the all-time record held by Pete Sampras. Additionally, following the tournament Nadal surpassed Jimmy Connors's record for the most consecutive days ranked in the world's top 10.

== Seeds ==
The top eight seeds receive a bye into the second round.

1. (Spain) Rafael Nadal (semifinals)
2. (Greece) Stefanos Tsitsipas (second round)
3. (Russia) Daniil Medvedev (champion)
4. (Germany) Alexander Zverev (final)
5. (Russia) Andrey Rublev (third round)
6. (Argentina) Diego Schwartzman (quarterfinals)
7. (Italy) Matteo Berrettini (second round)
8. (Belgium) David Goffin (second round)

9. (Spain) Pablo Carreño Busta (quarterfinals)
10. (Canada) Milos Raonic (semifinals)
11. (Russia) Karen Khachanov (first round)
12. (Switzerland) Stan Wawrinka (quarterfinals)
13. (Bulgaria) Grigor Dimitrov (withdrew)
14. (Canada) Félix Auger-Aliassime (first round)
15. (Croatia) Borna Ćorić (second round)
16. (Australia) Alex de Minaur (third round)

Click on the seed number of a player to go to their draw section.

== Draw ==
=== Key ===
- Q = Qualifier
- WC = Wild card
- LL = Lucky loser
- Alt = Alternate
- SE = Special exempt
- PR = Protected ranking
- ITF = ITF entry
- JE = Junior exempt
- w/o = Walkover
- r = Retired
- d = Defaulted
- SR = Special ranking

=== Finals ===
Quarterfinals
1	(Spain) Rafael Nadal	4	7	6
9	(Spain) Pablo Carreño Busta	6	5	1
4	(Germany) Alexander Zverev	6	7^{7}
12	(Switzerland) Stan Wawrinka	3	6^{1}
6	(Argentina) Diego Schwartzman	3	1
3	(Russia) Daniil Medvedev	6	6
10	(Canada) Milos Raonic	6	3	7^{9}
(France) Ugo Humbert	3	6	6^{7}

Semifinals
1	(Spain) Rafael Nadal	4	5
4	(Germany) Alexander Zverev	6	7
3	(Russia) Daniil Medvedev	6	7^{7}
10	(Canada) Milos Raonic	4	6^{4}

Final
4	(Germany) Alexander Zverev	7	4	1
3	(Russia) Daniil Medvedev	5	6	6

=== Top half ===
==== Section 1 ====
First round
(Serbia) F Krajinović	6^{11}	1
(Spain) F López	7^{13}	6
(Australia) J Thompson	6	6
Q	(Argentina) F Delbonis	2	3
Q	(Hungary) M Fucsovics	6^{5}	1
15	(Croatia) B Ćorić	7^{7}	6
9	(Spain) P Carreño Busta	6	6
WC	(France) H Gaston	3	2
(Georgia (country)) N Basilashvili	4	2
(Germany) J-L Struff	6	6
Q	(Italy) M Cecchinato	2	6^{2}
Q	(Slovakia) N Gombos	6	7^{7}

Second round
1	(Spain) R Nadal	4	7^{7}	6
(Spain) F López	6	6^{5}	4
(Australia) J Thompson	2	6	6
15	(Croatia) B Ćorić	6	4	2
9	(Spain) P Carreño Busta	7^{7}	6
(Germany) J-L Struff	6^{3}	2
Q	(Slovakia) N Gombos	6	7^{8}
8	(Belgium) D Goffin	4	6^{6}

Third round
1	(Spain) R Nadal	6	7^{7}
(Australia) J Thompson	1	6^{3}
9	(Spain) P Carreño Busta	7	6
Q	(Slovakia) N Gombos	5	2

Quarterfinals
1	(Spain) R Nadal	4	7	6
9	(Spain) P Carreño Busta	6	5	1

==== Section 2 ====
First round
(Serbia) M Kecmanović	6	6
(Australia) J Millman	4	2
(Japan) Y Nishioka	5	6	6
(Spain) P Andújar	7	4	2
(France) A Mannarino	7^{7}	6
(Serbia) D Lajović	6^{5}	3
12	(Switzerland) S Wawrinka	6	7^{7}
(United Kingdom) D Evans	3	6^{3}
(France) G Simon	6	3	3
(United States) T Paul	3	6	6
(Poland) H Hurkacz	5	7^{7}	4
LL	(Moldova) R Albot	7	6^{5}	6

Second round
4	(Germany) A Zverev	6	6
(Serbia) M Kecmanović	2	2
(Japan) Y Nishioka	3	7^{7}	3
(France) A Mannarino	6	6^{5}	6
12	(Switzerland) S Wawrinka	4	7^{7}	6
(United States) T Paul	6	6^{3}	2
LL	(Moldova) R Albot	1	2
5	(Russia) A Rublev	6	6

Third round
4	(Germany) A Zverev	7^{13}	6^{7}	6
(France) A Mannarino	6^{11}	7^{9}	4
12	(Switzerland) S Wawrinka	1	6	6
5	(Russia) A Rublev	6	4	3

Quarterfinals
4	(Germany) A Zverev	6	7^{7}
12	(Switzerland) S Wawrinka	3	6^{1}

=== Bottom half ===
==== Section 3 ====
First round
(France) R Gasquet	6	3	6
(United States) T Fritz	0	6	3
LL	(Argentina) F Coria	2	1
WC	(France) B Bonzi	6	6
Q	(Spain) A Davidovich Fokina	6	2	6
11	(Russia) K Khachanov	3	6	2
16	(Australia) A de Minaur	6	6
Q	(Italy) S Travaglia	4	4
(Italy) L Sonego	6	6
(Kazakhstan) A Bublik	1	4
LL	(Serbia) L Đere	2^{r}
SE	(South Africa) K Anderson	5

Second round
6	(Argentina) D Schwartzman	7	6
(France) R Gasquet	5	3
WC	(France) B Bonzi	4	4
Q	(Spain) A Davidovich Fokina	6	6
16	(Australia) A de Minaur	6	7
(Italy) L Sonego	3	5
SE	(South Africa) K Anderson	6^{r}
3	(Russia) D Medvedev	6

Third round
6	(Argentina) D Schwartzman	6	6
Q	(Spain) A Davidovich Fokina	1	1
16	(Australia) A de Minaur	7	2	2
3	(Russia) D Medvedev	5	6	6

Quarterfinals
6	(Argentina) D Schwartzman	3	1
3	(Russia) D Medvedev	6	6

==== Section 4 ====
First round
(Spain) A Ramos Viñolas	3	6	1
Q	(United States) M Giron	6	4	6
(United States) T Sandgren	6	4	6^{4}
WC	(France) P-H Herbert	2	6	7^{7}
(Slovenia) A Bedene	3	2
10	(Canada) M Raonic	6	6
14	(Canada) F Auger-Aliassime	0	6	3
(Croatia) M Čilić	6	3	6
LL	(Italy) S Caruso	6	6^{2}	3
WC	(France) C Moutet	3	7^{7}	6
(France) U Humbert	4	6	7^{7}
(Norway) C Ruud	6	2	6^{1}

Second round
7	(Italy) M Berrettini	6^{3}	7^{7}	5
Q	(United States) M Giron	7^{7}	6^{0}	7
WC	(France) P-H Herbert	4	4
10	(Canada) M Raonic	6	6
(Croatia) M Čilić	w/o
WC	(France) C Moutet
(France) U Humbert	7^{7}	6^{6}	7^{7}
2	(Greece) S Tsitsipas	6^{4}	7^{8}	6^{3}

Third round
Q	(United States) M Giron	6^{1}	2
10	(Canada) M Raonic	7^{7}	6
(Croatia) M Čilić	3	7^{7}	3
(France) U Humbert	6	6^{4}	6

Quarterfinals
10	(Canada) M Raonic	6	3	7^{9}
(France) U Humbert	3	6	6^{7}

== Qualifying ==
=== Seeds ===
1. (Hungary) Márton Fucsovics (qualified)
2. (Serbia) Laslo Đere (qualifying competition, lucky loser)
3. (Spain) Alejandro Davidovich Fokina (qualified)
4. (Uruguay) Pablo Cuevas (first round)
5. (Italy) Stefano Travaglia (qualified)
6. (Argentina) Federico Delbonis (qualified)
7. (Italy) Marco Cecchinato (qualified)
8. (Italy) Salvatore Caruso (qualifying competition, lucky loser)
9. (Canada) Vasek Pospisil (qualifying competition)
10. (Moldova) Radu Albot (qualifying competition, lucky loser)
11. (United States) Marcos Giron (qualified)
12. (Argentina) Federico Coria (qualifying competition, lucky loser)
13. (Germany) Yannick Hanfmann (qualifying competition, retired)
14. (Italy) Gianluca Mager (qualifying competition)

=== Qualifiers ===
1. (Hungary) Márton Fucsovics
2. (United States) Marcos Giron
3. (Spain) Alejandro Davidovich Fokina
4. (Slovakia) Norbert Gombos
5. (Italy) Stefano Travaglia
6. (Argentina) Federico Delbonis
7. (Italy) Marco Cecchinato

=== Lucky losers ===
1. (Serbia) Laslo Đere
2. (Italy) Salvatore Caruso
3. (Moldova) Radu Albot
4. (Argentina) Federico Coria

=== Qualifying draw ===
==== First qualifier ====
First round
1	(Hungary) Márton Fucsovics	6	6
WC	(France) Arthur Cazaux	3	1
WC	(France) Elliot Benchetrit	0	1
9	(Canada) Vasek Pospisil	6	6

Qualifying competition
1	(Hungary) Márton Fucsovics	4	7^{7}	6
9	(Canada) Vasek Pospisil	6	6^{3}	2

==== Second qualifier ====
First round
2	(Serbia) Laslo Đere	6	6
WC	(France) Antoine Cornut-Chauvinc	4	2
(Spain) Roberto Carballés Baena	4	1
11	(United States) Marcos Giron	6	6

Qualifying competition
2	(Serbia) Laslo Đere	6^{5}	6^{3}
11	(United States) Marcos Giron	7^{7}	7^{7}

==== Third qualifier ====
First round
3	(Spain) Alejandro Davidovich Fokina	6	6
(Italy) Paolo Lorenzi	1	1
(Australia) Marc Polmans	6	4	6^{2}
8	(Italy) Salvatore Caruso	3	6	7^{7}

Qualifying competition
3	(Spain) Alejandro Davidovich Fokina	6	1	6
8	(Italy) Salvatore Caruso	4	6	1

==== Fourth qualifier ====
First round
4	(Uruguay) Pablo Cuevas	4	4
(Slovakia) Norbert Gombos	6	6
(Italy) Alessandro Giannessi	5	4
10	(Moldova) Radu Albot	7	6

Qualifying competition
(Slovakia) Norbert Gombos	7	4	6
10	(Moldova) Radu Albot	5	6	4

==== Fifth qualifier ====
First round
5	(Italy) Stefano Travaglia	6	4	7^{7}
(Portugal) Pedro Sousa	3	6	6^{3}
(Colombia) Daniel Elahi Galán	6	3	4
14	(Italy) Gianluca Mager	3	6	6

Qualifying competition
5	(Italy) Stefano Travaglia	6	7
14	(Italy) Gianluca Mager	2	5

==== Sixth qualifier ====
First round
6	(Argentina) Federico Delbonis	7^{7}	3	7^{7}
(Slovakia) Andrej Martin	6^{5}	6	6^{1}
(Spain) Bernabé Zapata Miralles	4	1
13	(Germany) Yannick Hanfmann	6	6

Qualifying competition
6	(Argentina) Federico Delbonis	6	2
13	(Germany) Yannick Hanfmann	1	1^{r}

==== Seventh qualifier ====
First round
7	(Italy) Marco Cecchinato	6	6
(Chinese Taipei) Jason Jung	3	4
WC	(France) Arthur Rinderknech	3	6	3
12	(Argentina) Federico Coria	6	3	6

Qualifying competition
7	(Italy) Marco Cecchinato	7^{7}	6
12	(Argentina) Federico Coria	6^{2}	2
