= 2019 Rolex Paris Masters – Doubles =

Doubles
- 2019 Rolex Paris Masters

Final
- Champions: (France) Pierre-Hugues Herbert (France) Nicolas Mahut
- Runners-up: (Russia) Karen Khachanov (Russia) Andrey Rublev
- Score: 6–4, 6–1

Details
- Draw: 31
- Seeds: 8

Events
Singles	Doubles
← 2018 ·	Rolex Paris Masters	· 2020 →

Marcel Granollers and Rajeev Ram were the defending champions, but chose to compete with different partners. Granollers played alongside Horacio Zeballos, but lost in the second round to Jamie Murray and Neal Skupski. Ram teamed up with Joe Salisbury, but lost in the quarterfinals to Ivan Dodig and Filip Polášek.

Pierre-Hugues Herbert and Nicolas Mahut won the title, defeating Karen Khachanov and Andrey Rublev in the final, 6–4, 6–1.

== Seeds ==
1. (Colombia) Juan Sebastián Cabal / (Colombia) Robert Farah (second round)
2. (Spain) Marcel Granollers / (Argentina) Horacio Zeballos (second round)
3. (Poland) Łukasz Kubot / (Brazil) Marcelo Melo (first round)
4. (Croatia) Mate Pavić / (Brazil) Bruno Soares (first round)
5. (Germany) Kevin Krawietz / (Germany) Andreas Mies (semifinals)
6. (South Africa) Raven Klaasen / (New Zealand) Michael Venus (first round)
7. (France) Pierre-Hugues Herbert / (France) Nicolas Mahut (champions)
8. (Croatia) Ivan Dodig / (Slovakia) Filip Polášek (semifinals)

== Draw ==
=== Key ===
- Q = Qualifier
- WC = Wild card
- LL = Lucky loser
- Alt = Alternate
- SE = Special exempt
- PR = Protected ranking
- ITF = ITF entry
- JE = Junior exempt
- w/o = Walkover
- r = Retired
- d = Defaulted
- SR = Special ranking

=== Finals ===
Semifinals
8	(Croatia) Ivan Dodig (Slovakia) Filip Polášek	6^{7}	6	[9]
(Russia) Karen Khachanov (Russia) Andrey Rublev	7^{9}	0	[11]
7	(France) Pierre-Hugues Herbert (France) Nicolas Mahut	7^{7}	6
5	(Germany) Kevin Krawietz (Germany) Andreas Mies	6^{1}	0

Final
(Russia) Karen Khachanov (Russia) Andrey Rublev	4	1
7	(France) Pierre-Hugues Herbert (France) Nicolas Mahut	6	6

=== Top half ===
First round
1	(Colombia) JS Cabal (Colombia) R Farah	7	6
(Croatia) N Mektić (Croatia) F Škugor	5	4
(Netherlands) R Haase (Netherlands) W Koolhof	1	3
(United States) R Ram (United Kingdom) J Salisbury	6	6
WC	(France) Q Halys (France) T Lamasine	2	3
(Austria) J Melzer (France) É Roger-Vasselin	6	6
(Belgium) S Gillé (Belgium) J Vliegen	6^{2}	6^{4}
8	(Croatia) I Dodig (Slovakia) F Polášek	7^{7}	7^{7}
3	(Poland) Ł Kubot (Brazil) M Melo	6^{5}	6	[8]
(Argentina) M González (United States) A Krajicek	7^{7}	4	[10]
(France) B Paire (Spain) F Verdasco	4	5
(India) R Bopanna (Canada) D Shapovalov	6	7
(Pakistan) A-u-H Qureshi (Greece) S Tsitsipas	6	4	[5]
(Russia) K Khachanov (Russia) A Rublev	3	6	[10]
(New Zealand) M Daniell (Austria) P Oswald	6	6^{2}	[10]
6	(South Africa) R Klaasen (New Zealand) M Venus	1	7^{7}	[7]

Second round
1	(Colombia) JS Cabal (Colombia) R Farah	5	7	[3]
(United States) R Ram (United Kingdom) J Salisbury	7	5	[10]
(Austria) J Melzer (France) É Roger-Vasselin	6	3	[8]
8	(Croatia) I Dodig (Slovakia) F Polášek	2	6	[10]
(Argentina) M González (United States) A Krajicek	1	3
(India) R Bopanna (Canada) D Shapovalov	6	6
(Russia) K Khachanov (Russia) A Rublev	6	7
(New Zealand) M Daniell (Austria) P Oswald	4	5

Quarterfinals
(United States) R Ram (United Kingdom) J Salisbury	3	7^{7}	[7]
8	(Croatia) I Dodig (Slovakia) F Polášek	6	6^{5}	[10]
(India) R Bopanna (Canada) D Shapovalov	5	7^{7}	[8]
(Russia) K Khachanov (Russia) A Rublev	7	6^{1}	[10]

Semifinals
8	(Croatia) I Dodig (Slovakia) F Polášek	6^{7}	6	[9]
(Russia) K Khachanov (Russia) A Rublev	7^{9}	0	[11]

=== Bottom half ===
First round
7	(France) P-H Herbert (France) N Mahut	w/o
WC	(France) A Mannarino (France) G Simon
(Poland) H Hurkacz (Germany) J-L Struff	6	7^{12}
(Finland) H Kontinen (Australia) J Peers	4	6^{10}
Alt	(India) D Sharan (New Zealand) A Sitak	6^{5}	6	[10]
4	(Croatia) M Pavić (Brazil) B Soares	7^{7}	4	[3]
5	(Germany) K Krawietz (Germany) A Mies	6	6
(Italy) F Fognini (Spain) F López	4	4
(Croatia) M Čilić (Uruguay) P Cuevas	7^{7}	6
(Australia) A de Minaur (United States) T Fritz	6^{3}	3
(United Kingdom) J Murray (United Kingdom) N Skupski	6	3	[10]
WC	(France) E Benchetrit (France) C Moutet	4	6	[7]
(Netherlands) J-J Rojer (Romania) H Tecău	6	3	[4]
2	(Spain) M Granollers (Argentina) H Zeballos	3	6	[10]

Second round
7	(France) P-H Herbert (France) N Mahut	6	6
(Poland) H Hurkacz (Germany) J-L Struff	3	4
(France) J Chardy (France) F Martin	6	6
Alt	(India) D Sharan (New Zealand) A Sitak	2	3
5	(Germany) K Krawietz (Germany) A Mies	7^{7}	6
(Croatia) M Čilić (Uruguay) P Cuevas	6^{3}	1
(United Kingdom) J Murray (United Kingdom) N Skupski	6	3	[11]
2	(Spain) M Granollers (Argentina) H Zeballos	3	6	[9]

Quarterfinals
7	(France) P-H Herbert (France) N Mahut	6	7
(France) J Chardy (France) F Martin	3	5
5	(Germany) K Krawietz (Germany) A Mies	6	6
(United Kingdom) J Murray (United Kingdom) N Skupski	4	4

Semifinals
7	(France) P-H Herbert (France) N Mahut	7^{7}	6
5	(Germany) K Krawietz (Germany) A Mies	6^{1}	0
