= 2018 Rolex Paris Masters – Singles =

Singles
- 2018 Rolex Paris Masters

Final
- Champion: (Russia) Karen Khachanov
- Runner-up: (Serbia) Novak Djokovic
- Score: 7–5, 6–4

Details
- Draw: 48 (6 Q / 3 WC )
- Seeds: 16

Events
Singles	Doubles
← 2017 ·	Rolex Paris Masters	· 2019 →

Karen Khachanov defeated Novak Djokovic in the final, 7–5, 6–4 to win the singles tennis title at the 2018 Paris Masters. It was his first Masters 1000 title, and he saved two match points en route, in the third round against John Isner.

Jack Sock was the defending champion, but lost to Dominic Thiem in the quarterfinals. As a result, Sock fell out of the top 100 in the rankings, after starting the season inside the top 10.

Rafael Nadal and Djokovic were in contention for the world No. 1 singles ranking. Djokovic regained the top spot by winning his opening match following Nadal's withdrawal from the tournament.

This tournament marked the first time since the 1998 Stuttgart Masters that no French or Spanish players reached the round-of-16 of a Masters event.

== Seeds ==
All seeds receive a bye into the second round.

1. (Spain) ~~Rafael Nadal~~ (withdrew due to abdominal injury)
2. (Serbia) Novak Djokovic (final)
3. (Switzerland) Roger Federer (semifinals)
4. (Germany) Alexander Zverev (quarterfinals)
5. (Croatia) Marin Čilić (quarterfinals)
6. (Austria) Dominic Thiem (semifinals)
7. (South Africa) Kevin Anderson (third round)
8. (United States) John Isner (third round)

9. (Bulgaria) Grigor Dimitrov (third round)
10. (Japan) Kei Nishikori (quarterfinals)
11. (Croatia) Borna Ćorić (third round)
12. (United Kingdom) ~~Kyle Edmund~~ (withdrew due to knee injury)
13. (Italy) Fabio Fognini (third round)
14. (Greece) Stefanos Tsitsipas (second round)
15. (Argentina) Diego Schwartzman (third round)
16. (United States) Jack Sock (quarterfinals)

Click on the seed number of a player to go to their draw section.

== Draw ==
=== Key ===
- Q = Qualifier
- WC = Wild card
- LL = Lucky loser
- Alt = Alternate
- ITF = ITF entry
- PR = Protected ranking
- SR = Special ranking
- SE = Special exempt
- JE = Junior exempt
- JR = Junior Accelerator Programme entrant
- CO = College Accelerator Programme entrant
- NG = Next Gen Accelerator Program entrant
- w/o = Walkover
- r = Retired
- d = Defaulted

=== Finals ===
Quarterfinals
16	(United States) Jack Sock	6	4	4
6	(Austria) Dominic Thiem	4	6	6
4	(Germany) Alexander Zverev	1	2
(Russia) Karen Khachanov	6	6
10	(Japan) Kei Nishikori	4	4
3	(Switzerland) Roger Federer	6	6
5	(Croatia) Marin Čilić	6	2	3
2	(Serbia) Novak Djokovic	4	6	6

Semifinals
6	(Austria) Dominic Thiem	4	1
(Russia) Karen Khachanov	6	6
3	(Switzerland) Roger Federer	6^{6}	7	6^{3}
2	(Serbia) Novak Djokovic	7^{8}	5	7^{7}

Final
(Russia) Karen Khachanov	7	6
2	(Serbia) Novak Djokovic	5	4

=== Top half ===
==== Section 1 ====
First round
(Spain) F Verdasco	6	6
(France) J Chardy	4	4
(France) R Gasquet	6	7^{7}
(Canada) D Shapovalov	4	6^{3}
(Russia) D Medvedev	6	6
(Spain) P Carreño Busta	2	2
(France) G Simon	6	6
(France) L Pouille	3	4

Second round
LL	(Tunisia) M Jaziri	7^{7}	1	6
(Spain) F Verdasco	6^{5}	6	3
(France) R Gasquet	3	3
16	(United States) J Sock	6	6
11	(Croatia) B Ćorić	6	6
(Russia) D Medvedev	4	4
(France) G Simon	4	2
6	(Austria) D Thiem	6	6

Third round
LL	(Tunisia) M Jaziri	0	4
16	(United States) J Sock	6	6
11	(Croatia) B Ćorić	7^{7}	2	5
6	(Austria) D Thiem	6^{3}	6	7

Quarterfinals
16	(United States) J Sock	6	4	4
6	(Austria) D Thiem	4	6	6

==== Section 2 ====
First round
(United States) F Tiafoe	7^{7}	6
Q	(France) N Mahut	6^{1}	2
Q	(Spain) F López	6^{4}	6	7^{8}
(Australia) A de Minaur	7^{7}	4	6^{6}
(Russia) K Khachanov	7	6
(Serbia) F Krajinović	5	2
WC	(France) P-H Herbert	6	3	5
SE	(Kazakhstan) M Kukushkin	3	6	7

Second round
4	(Germany) A Zverev	6	6
(United States) F Tiafoe	4	4
Q	(Spain) F López	4	6	5
15	(Argentina) D Schwartzman	6	3	7
LL	(Australia) M Ebden	2	0^{r}
(Russia) K Khachanov	6	2
SE	(Kazakhstan) M Kukushkin	3	7^{7}	6^{1}
8	(United States) J Isner	6	6^{2}	7^{7}

Third round
4	(Germany) A Zverev	6	6
15	(Argentina) D Schwartzman	4	2
(Russia) K Khachanov	6	6^{9}	7^{10}
8	(United States) J Isner	4	7^{11}	6^{8}

Quarterfinals
4	(Germany) A Zverev	1	2
(Russia) K Khachanov	6	6

=== Bottom half ===
==== Section 3 ====
First round
(Georgia (country)) N Basilashvili	6	0
(Australia) J Millman	4	0^{r}
(France) A Mannarino	6	6
WC	(France) U Humbert	4	2
(Hungary) M Fucsovics	6	6
Q	(France) B Paire	4	4
(Canada) M Raonic	6^{4}	7^{7}	7^{7}
WC	(France) J-W Tsonga	7^{7}	6^{5}	6^{5}

Second round
7	(South Africa) K Anderson	6	6^{3}	7^{7}
(Georgia (country)) N Basilashvili	3	7^{7}	6^{3}
(France) A Mannarino	5	4
10	(Japan) K Nishikori	7	6
13	(Italy) F Fognini	w/o
(Hungary) M Fucsovics
(Canada) M Raonic
3	(Switzerland) R Federer	w/o

Third round
7	(South Africa) K Anderson	4	4
10	(Japan) K Nishikori	6	6
13	(Italy) F Fognini	4	3
3	(Switzerland) R Federer	6	6

Quarterfinals
10	(Japan) K Nishikori	4	4
3	(Switzerland) R Federer	6	6

==== Section 4 ====
First round
(Germany) P Kohlschreiber	6^{4}	6	6
Q	(Netherlands) R Haase	7^{7}	4	2
(Spain) R Bautista Agut	6	7^{7}
(United States) S Johnson	4	6^{2}
Q	(Germany) P Gojowczyk	4	6^{5}
(Bosnia and Herzegovina) D Džumhur	6	7^{7}
(Italy) M Cecchinato	5	3
Q	(Portugal) J Sousa	7	6

Second round
5	(Croatia) M Čilić	6	6
(Germany) P Kohlschreiber	3	4
(Spain) R Bautista Agut	6^{10}	4
9	(Bulgaria) G Dimitrov	7^{12}	6
14	(Greece) S Tsitsipas	3	3
(Bosnia and Herzegovina) D Džumhur	6	6
Q	(Portugal) J Sousa	5	1
2	(Serbia) N Djokovic	7	6

Third round
5	(Croatia) M Čilić	7^{7}	6
9	(Bulgaria) G Dimitrov	6^{5}	4
(Bosnia and Herzegovina) D Džumhur	1	1^{r}
2	(Serbia) N Djokovic	6	2

Quarterfinals
5	(Croatia) M Čilić	6	2	3
2	(Serbia) N Djokovic	4	6	6

== Qualifying ==
=== Seeds ===
1. (Australia) Matthew Ebden (qualifying competition, lucky loser)
2. (Chile) Nicolás Jarry (first round)
3. (Italy) Andreas Seppi (first round)
4. (Netherlands) Robin Haase (qualified)
5. (Portugal) João Sousa (qualified)
6. (Serbia) Dušan Lajović (first round)
7. (Germany) Jan-Lennard Struff (first round)
8. (Tunisia) Malek Jaziri (qualifying competition, lucky loser)
9. (United States) Sam Querrey (first round)
10. (France) Benoît Paire (qualified)
11. (Germany) Peter Gojowczyk (qualified)
12. (United States) Tennys Sandgren (qualifying competition)

=== Qualifiers ===
1. (Spain) Feliciano López
2. (Germany) Peter Gojowczyk
3. (France) Nicolas Mahut
4. (Netherlands) Robin Haase
5. (Portugal) João Sousa
6. (France) Benoît Paire

=== Lucky losers ===
1. (Australia) Matthew Ebden
2. (Tunisia) Malek Jaziri

=== Qualifying draw ===
==== First qualifier ====
First round
1	(Australia) Matthew Ebden	6	3	6
(Argentina) Guido Pella	3	6	1
(Spain) Feliciano López	6	6^{2}	7^{7}
7	(Germany) Jan-Lennard Struff	3	7^{7}	6^{5}

Qualifying competition
1	(Australia) Matthew Ebden	6^{4}	4
(Spain) Feliciano López	7^{7}	6

==== Second qualifier ====
First round
2	(Chile) Nicolás Jarry	6^{2}	4
(Spain) Albert Ramos Viñolas	7^{7}	6
(Slovenia) Aljaž Bedene	4	6	2
11	(Germany) Peter Gojowczyk	6	4	6

Qualifying competition
(Spain) Albert Ramos Viñolas	3	4
11	(Germany) Peter Gojowczyk	6	6

==== Third qualifier ====
First round
3	(Italy) Andreas Seppi	4	7	3
(United States) Denis Kudla	6	5	6
WC	(France) Nicolas Mahut	3	7^{7}	7^{7}
9	(United States) Sam Querrey	6	6^{1}	6^{3}

Qualifying competition
(United States) Denis Kudla	7^{7}	6^{5}	0
WC	(France) Nicolas Mahut	6^{2}	7^{7}	6

==== Fourth qualifier ====
First round
4	(Netherlands) Robin Haase	6	6
WC	(France) Corentin Moutet	2	1
WC	(France) Constant Lestienne	4	6^{4}
8	(Tunisia) Malek Jaziri	6	7^{7}

Qualifying competition
4	(Netherlands) Robin Haase	2	7	7
8	(Tunisia) Malek Jaziri	6	5	5

==== Fifth qualifier ====
First round
5	(Portugal) João Sousa	6^{2}	6	6
WC	(France) Grégoire Barrère	7^{7}	0	2
(United States) Mackenzie McDonald	6	3	4
12	(United States) Tennys Sandgren	4	6	6

Qualifying competition
5	(Portugal) João Sousa	6^{1}	6	6
12	(United States) Tennys Sandgren	7^{7}	3	4

==== Sixth qualifier ====
First round
6	(Serbia) Dušan Lajović	6	5	6^{3}
Alt	(Canada) Vasek Pospisil	4	7	7^{7}
(Japan) Taro Daniel	3	3
10	(France) Benoît Paire	6	6

Qualifying competition
Alt	(Canada) Vasek Pospisil	6^{7}	0^{r}
10	(France) Benoît Paire	7^{9}	0
