= 2019 Rolex Paris Masters – Singles =

Singles
- 2019 Rolex Paris Masters

Final
- Champion: (Serbia) Novak Djokovic
- Runner-up: (Canada) Denis Shapovalov
- Score: 6–3, 6–4

Details
- Draw: 48 (6 Q / 3 WC )
- Seeds: 16

Events
Singles	Doubles
← 2018 ·	Rolex Paris Masters	· 2020 →

Novak Djokovic defeated Denis Shapovalov in the final, 6–3, 6–4 to win the singles tennis title at the 2019 Paris Masters. It was his record-extending fifth Paris Masters title, and he did not drop a set en route.

Karen Khachanov was the defending champion, but lost in the second round to Jan-Lennard Struff.

Rafael Nadal withdrew, prior to his semifinal match with Shapovalov, due to an abdominal injury. He regained the ATP No. 1 ranking from Djokovic at the conclusion of the tournament.

== Seeds ==
All seeds receive a bye into the second round.

1. (Serbia) Novak Djokovic (champion)
2. (Spain) Rafael Nadal (semifinals, withdrew)
3. (Switzerland) Roger Federer (withdrew)
4. (Russia) Daniil Medvedev (second round)
5. (Austria) Dominic Thiem (third round)
6. (Germany) Alexander Zverev (third round)
7. (Greece) Stefanos Tsitsipas (quarterfinals)
8. (Russia) Karen Khachanov (second round)

9. (Spain) Roberto Bautista Agut (second round)
10. (Italy) Matteo Berrettini (second round)
11. (Italy) Fabio Fognini (second round)
12. (Belgium) David Goffin (second round)
13. (France) Gaël Monfils (quarterfinals)
14. (Argentina) Diego Schwartzman (second round)
15. (United States) John Isner (second round)
16. (Switzerland) Stan Wawrinka (third round)

Click on the seed number of a player to go to their draw section.

== Draw ==
=== Key ===
- Q = Qualifier
- WC = Wild card
- LL = Lucky loser
- Alt = Alternate
- SE = Special exempt
- PR = Protected ranking
- ITF = ITF entry
- JE = Junior exempt
- w/o = Walkover
- r = Retired
- d = Defaulted
- SR = Special ranking

=== Finals ===
Quarterfinals
1	(Serbia) Novak Djokovic	6	6
7	(Greece) Stefanos Tsitsipas	1	2
(Chile) Cristian Garín	2	5
(Bulgaria) Grigor Dimitrov	6	7
(Canada) Denis Shapovalov	6	6
13	(France) Gaël Monfils	2	2
WC	(France) Jo-Wilfried Tsonga	6^{4}	1
2	(Spain) Rafael Nadal	7^{7}	6

Semifinals
1	(Serbia) Novak Djokovic	7^{7}	6
(Bulgaria) Grigor Dimitrov	6^{5}	4
(Canada) Denis Shapovalov	w/o
2	(Spain) Rafael Nadal

Final
1	(Serbia) Novak Djokovic	6	6
(Canada) Denis Shapovalov	3	4

=== Top half ===
==== Section 1 ====
First round
(Serbia) D Lajović	4	6	3
LL	(France) C Moutet	6	1	6
(United Kingdom) K Edmund	6	6
Q	(Lithuania) R Berankis	4	3
(Serbia) L Đere	1	4
(Australia) A de Minaur	6	6
(United States) F Tiafoe	6^{6}	6	4
(United States) T Fritz	7^{8}	3	6

Second round
1	(Serbia) N Djokovic	7^{7}	6
LL	(France) C Moutet	6^{2}	4
(United Kingdom) K Edmund	7	6
14	(Argentina) D Schwartzman	5	3
9	(Spain) R Bautista Agut	6^{2}	6^{1}
(Australia) A de Minaur	7^{7}	7^{7}
(United States) T Fritz	6^{3}	3
7	(Greece) S Tsitsipas	7^{7}	6

Third round
1	(Serbia) N Djokovic	7^{9}	6
(United Kingdom) K Edmund	6^{7}	1
(Australia) A de Minaur	3	4
7	(Greece) S Tsitsipas	6	6

Quarterfinals
1	(Serbia) N Djokovic	6	6
7	(Greece) S Tsitsipas	1	2

==== Section 2 ====
First round
Q	(France) J Chardy	5	6	7
Q	(United States) S Querrey	7	3	5
(Uruguay) P Cuevas	4	3
(Chile) C Garín	6	6
(Bulgaria) G Dimitrov	4	6	6
WC	(France) U Humbert	6	1	2
Q	(United Kingdom) C Norrie	3	2
(Canada) M Raonic	6	6

Second round
4	(Russia) D Medvedev	6	2	4
Q	(France) J Chardy	4	6	6
(Chile) C Garín	7^{7}	7^{7}
15	(United States) J Isner	6^{5}	6^{4}
12	(Belgium) D Goffin	5	3
(Bulgaria) G Dimitrov	7	6
(Canada) M Raonic	6^{5}	7	4
5	(Austria) D Thiem	7^{7}	5	6

Third round
Q	(France) J Chardy	7^{7}	4	6^{6}
(Chile) C Garín	6^{4}	6	7^{8}
(Bulgaria) G Dimitrov	6	6
5	(Austria) D Thiem	3	2

Quarterfinals
(Chile) C Garín	2	5
(Bulgaria) G Dimitrov	6	7

=== Bottom half ===
==== Section 3 ====
First round
(Croatia) B Ćorić	6	4	3
(Spain) F Verdasco	3	6	6
(France) G Simon	2^{r}
(Canada) D Shapovalov	2
(France) B Paire	7	6
LL	(Bosnia and Herzegovina) D Džumhur	5	4
(Georgia (country)) N Basilashvili	3	2
(Moldova) R Albot	6	6

Second round
6	(Germany) A Zverev	6	6
(Spain) F Verdasco	1	3
(Canada) D Shapovalov	3	6	6
11	(Italy) F Fognini	6	3	3
13	(France) G Monfils	6	7^{7}
(France) B Paire	4	6^{4}
(Moldova) R Albot	7^{7}	7^{8}
LL	(Italy) A Seppi	6^{5}	6^{6}

Third round
6	(Germany) A Zverev	2	7	2
(Canada) D Shapovalov	6	5	6
13	(France) G Monfils	4	6	6
(Moldova) R Albot	6	4	1

Quarterfinals
(Canada) D Shapovalov	6	6
13	(France) G Monfils	2	2

==== Section 4 ====
First round
(Germany) J-L Struff	4	7	6
Q	(Japan) Y Nishioka	6	5	2
(Russia) A Rublev	6	5	4
WC	(France) J-W Tsonga	4	7	6
(Croatia) M Čilić	7^{7}	6
(Poland) H Hurkacz	6^{5}	4
Q	(Norway) C Ruud	4	2
WC	(France) A Mannarino	6	6

Second round
8	(Russia) K Khachanov	6^{5}	6	5
(Germany) J-L Struff	7^{7}	3	7
WC	(France) J-W Tsonga	6	6
10	(Italy) M Berrettini	4	3
16	(Switzerland) S Wawrinka	7^{7}	7^{7}
(Croatia) M Čilić	6^{3}	6^{5}
WC	(France) A Mannarino	5	4
2	(Spain) R Nadal	7	6

Third round
(Germany) J-L Struff	6	4	6^{6}
WC	(France) J-W Tsonga	2	6	7^{8}
16	(Switzerland) S Wawrinka	4	4
2	(Spain) R Nadal	6	6

Quarterfinals
WC	(France) J-W Tsonga	6^{4}	1
2	(Spain) R Nadal	7^{7}	6

== Qualifying ==
=== Seeds ===
1. (Spain) Albert Ramos Viñolas (first round)
2. (Uruguay) Pablo Cuevas (moved to main draw)
3. (United States) Sam Querrey (qualified)
4. (Kazakhstan) Alexander Bublik (first round)
5. (Argentina) Juan Ignacio Londero (first round)
6. (Australia) John Millman (first round)
7. (Serbia) Miomir Kecmanović (first round)
8. (Italy) Lorenzo Sonego (first round)
9. (United Kingdom) Cameron Norrie (qualified)
10. (Spain) Feliciano López (first round)
11. (Spain) Pablo Andújar (first round)
12. (Norway) Casper Ruud (qualified)

=== Qualifiers ===
1. (France) Jérémy Chardy
2. (United Kingdom) Cameron Norrie
3. (United States) Sam Querrey
4. (Japan) Yoshihito Nishioka
5. (Norway) Casper Ruud
6. (Lithuania) Ričardas Berankis

=== Lucky losers ===
1. (Bosnia and Herzegovina) Damir Džumhur
2. (Italy) Andreas Seppi
3. (France) Corentin Moutet

=== Qualifying draw ===
==== First qualifier ====
First round
1	(Spain) Albert Ramos Viñolas	4	4
(France) Jérémy Chardy	6	6
WC	(France) Corentin Moutet	3	6	6
8	(Italy) Lorenzo Sonego	6	3	0

Qualifying competition
(France) Jérémy Chardy	6^{2}	7^{7}	6
WC	(France) Corentin Moutet	7^{7}	6^{3}	2

==== Second qualifier ====
First round
Alt	(Belarus) Egor Gerasimov	5	6	6
(Spain) Roberto Carballés Baena	7	3	4
(Argentina) Federico Delbonis	3	6^{4}
9	(United Kingdom) Cameron Norrie	6	7^{7}

Qualifying competition
Alt	(Belarus) Egor Gerasimov	6	5	6^{3}
9	(United Kingdom) Cameron Norrie	2	7	7^{7}

==== Third qualifier ====
First round
3	(United States) Sam Querrey	6	6
WC	(France) Elliot Benchetrit	4	2
WC	(France) Rayane Roumane	6	4	7^{8}
7	(Serbia) Miomir Kecmanović	3	6	6^{6}

Qualifying competition
3	(United States) Sam Querrey	7	6
WC	(France) Rayane Roumane	5	1

==== Fourth qualifier ====
First round
4	(Kazakhstan) Alexander Bublik	6^{5}	5
(Italy) Andreas Seppi	7^{7}	7
(Japan) Yoshihito Nishioka	6^{2}	6	6
10	(Spain) Feliciano López	7^{7}	3	2

Qualifying competition
(Italy) Andreas Seppi	3	6	5
(Japan) Yoshihito Nishioka	6	3	7

==== Fifth qualifier ====
First round
5	(Argentina) Juan Ignacio Londero	6^{2}	4
WC	(France) Hugo Gaston	7^{7}	6
(Sweden) Mikael Ymer	4	6	4
12	(Norway) Casper Ruud	6	3	6

Qualifying competition
WC	(France) Hugo Gaston	4	6	3
12	(Norway) Casper Ruud	6	3	6

==== Sixth qualifier ====
First round
6	(Australia) John Millman	2	6^{1}
(Lithuania) Ričardas Berankis	6	7^{7}
Alt	(Bosnia and Herzegovina) Damir Džumhur	6	6
11	(Spain) Pablo Andújar	3	0

Qualifying competition
(Lithuania) Ričardas Berankis	6	3	7^{7}
Alt	(Bosnia and Herzegovina) Damir Džumhur	3	6	6^{4}
