= Diego Schwartzman career statistics =

Career finals
| Discipline | Type | Won | Lost | Total | |
|---|---|---|---|---|---|
| Singles | Grand Slam | - | - | - | |
| Singles | ATP Finals | - | - | - | |
| Singles | ATP 1000 | 0 | 1 | 1 | |
| Singles | ATP 500 | 1 | 2 | 3 | |
| Singles | ATP 250 | 3 | 7 | 10 | |
| Singles | Olympics | – | – | – | |
| Singles | Total | 4 | 10 | 14 | |
| Doubles | Grand Slam | – | – | – | |
| Doubles | ATP Finals | – | – | – | |
| Doubles | ATP 1000 | 0 | 2 | 2 | |
| Doubles | ATP 500 | - | - | - | |
| Doubles | ATP 250 | 0 | 3 | 3 | |
| Doubles | Olympics | – | – | – | |
| Doubles | Total | 0 | 5 | 5 | 0.00 |

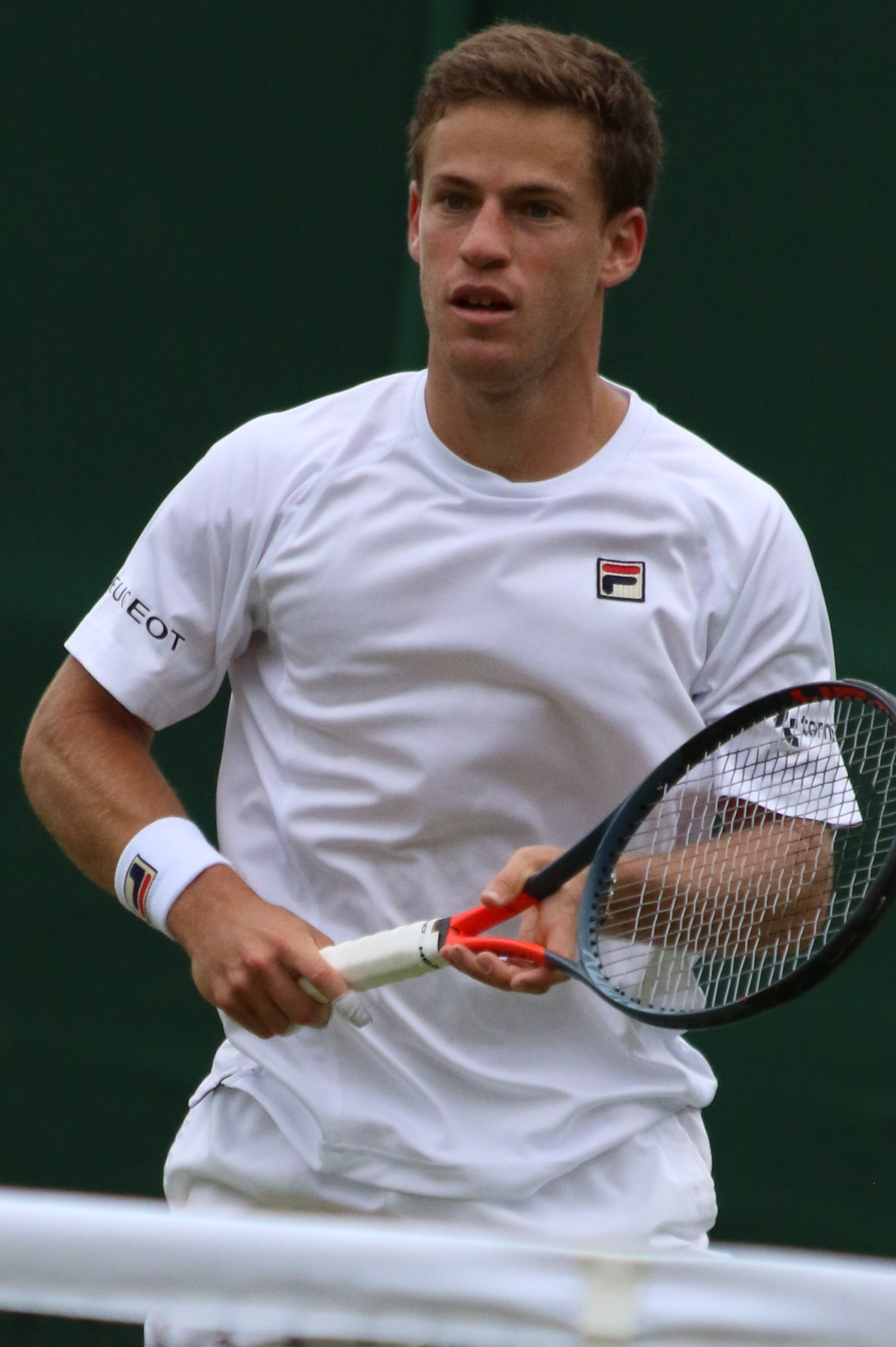
Diego Schwartzman in 2019

This is a list of the main career statistics of Argentinian professional tennis player Diego Schwartzman. All statistics are according to the ATP Tour and ITF.

== Performance timelines ==
Key
| W | F | SF | QF | #R | RR | Q# | DNQ | A | NH |

(W) winner; (F) finalist; (SF) semifinalist; (QF) quarterfinalist; (#R) rounds 4, 3, 2, 1; (RR) round-robin stage; (Q#) qualification round; (DNQ) did not qualify; (A) absent; (NH) not held; (SR) strike rate (events won / competed); (W–L) win–loss record.
To avoid confusion and double counting, these charts are updated at the conclusion of a tournament or when the player's participation has ended.

=== Singles ===
| Tournament | 2013 | 2014 | 2015 | 2016 | 2017 | 2018 | 2019 | 2020 | 2021 | 2022 | 2023 | 2024 | 2025 | SR | W–L | Win% |
|---|---|---|---|---|---|---|---|---|---|---|---|---|---|---|---|---|
Grand Slam tournaments
| Australian Open | Q3 | Q1 | 1R | 1R | 2R | 4R | 3R | 4R | 3R | 2R | 2R | Q1 | A | 0 / 9 | 13–9 | 59% |
| French Open | Q2 | 2R | 2R | 1R | 3R | QF | 2R | SF | QF | 4R | 3R | Q2 | A | 0 / 10 | 23–10 | 70% |
| Wimbledon | A | A | 1R | 1R | 1R | 2R | 3R | NH | 3R | 2R | 2R | Q1 | A | 0 / 8 | 7–8 | 47% |
| US Open | Q3 | 1R | 2R | 1R | QF | 3R | QF | 1R | 4R | 3R | 1R | 1R | A | 0 / 11 | 16–11 | 59% |
| Win–loss | 0–0 | 1–2 | 2–4 | 0–4 | 7–4 | 10–4 | 9–4 | 8–3 | 11–4 | 5–4 | 4–4 | 0–1 | 0–0 | 0 / 38 | 59–38 | 61% |
Year-end championship
| ATP Finals | did not qualify | | | | | | | RR | did not qualify | | | | | 0 / 1 | 0–3 | 0% |
National representation
| Summer Olympics | not held | | | A | not held | | | | 3R | NH | | A | NH | 0 / 1 | 2–1 | 67% |
| Davis Cup | A | A | SF | A | PO | PO | QF | A | Z1 | RR | A | A | A | 0 / 3 | 7–7 | 50% |
ATP Masters 1000
| Indian Wells Open | A | A | 2R | 1R | 1R | 2R | 3R | NH | QF | 3R | 2R | Q1 | A | 0 / 8 | 7–8 | 47% |
| Miami Open | Q1 | Q1 | 1R | 1R | 3R | 3R | 2R | NH | 4R | 2R | 3R | 1R | A | 0 / 9 | 6–9 | 40% |
| Monte-Carlo Masters | A | A | 1R | A | QF | 2R | 2R | NH | 2R | QF | 2R | Q1 | A | 0 / 7 | 9–7 | 56% |
| Madrid Open | A | A | A | A | 2R | 3R | 2R | NH | 2R | 2R | 1R | Q1 | A | 0 / 6 | 5–6 | 45% |
| Italian Open | A | A | 1R | A | 1R | 2R | SF | F | 2R | 2R | 1R | 1R | A | 0 / 9 | 10–9 | 53% |
| Canadian Open | A | A | A | A | QF | 3R | 2R | NH | 3R | 2R | 1R | A | A | 0 / 6 | 8–6 | 57% |
| Cincinnati Open | A | A | A | Q1 | 1R | 1R | 3R | 2R | 3R | 3R | Q2 | A | A | 0 / 6 | 7–6 | 54% |
| Shanghai Masters | A | A | A | Q1 | 2R | 1R | 1R | NH | | | 4R | A | A | 0 / 4 | 4–4 | 50% |
| Paris Masters | A | A | A | A | 2R | 3R | 2R | QF | 2R | 1R | A | A | A | 0 / 6 | 5–6 | 45% |
| Win–loss | 0–0 | 0–0 | 1–4 | 0–2 | 11–9 | 8–9 | 10–9 | 7–3 | 9–8 | 9–8 | 6–7 | 0–2 | 0–0 | 0 / 61 | 61–61 | 50% |
Career statistics
| | 2013 | 2014 | 2015 | 2016 | 2017 | 2018 | 2019 | 2020 | 2021 | 2022 | 2023 | 2024 | 2025 | Career | | |
| Tournaments | 5 | 4 | 20 | 18 | 27 | 26 | 25 | 11 | 21 | 23 | 25 | 8 | 1 | Career total: 214 | | |
| Titles | 0 | 0 | 0 | 1 | 0 | 1 | 1 | 0 | 1 | 0 | 0 | 0 | 0 | Career total: 4 | | |
| Finals | 0 | 0 | 0 | 2 | 1 | 1 | 3 | 3 | 2 | 2 | 0 | 0 | 0 | Career total: 14 | | |
| Overall win–loss | 1–5 | 2–4 | 11–22 | 17–17 | 39–28 | 33–26 | 40–26 | 25–15 | 38–23 | 31–26 | 13–25 | 0–8 | 1–1 | 4 / 214 | 251–226 | 53% |
| Win % | 17% | 33% | 33% | 50% | 58% | 56% | 61% | 63% | 62% | 54% | 34% | 0% | 50% | 53% | | |
| Year-end ranking | 117 | 61 | 88 | 52 | 26 | 17 | 14 | 9 | 13 | 25 | 114 | 370 | - | $14,216,322 | | |

=== Doubles ===
| Tournament | 2014 | 2015 | 2016 | 2017 | 2018 | 2019 | 2020 | 2021 | 2022 | 2023 | 2024 | SR | W–L |
|---|---|---|---|---|---|---|---|---|---|---|---|---|---|
Grand Slam tournaments
| Australian Open | A | 2R | A | 1R | 1R | 1R | 1R | 1R | A | 1R | A | 0 / 7 | 1–7 |
| French Open | A | 1R | 1R | 1R | 2R | SF | 2R | 1R | A | A | A | 0 / 7 | 6–7 |
| Wimbledon | A | 1R | 2R | 1R | A | A | NH | A | 1R | A | A | 0 / 4 | 1–4 |
| US Open | 1R | 2R | 2R | 1R | 1R | 1R | A | A | A | A | A | 0 / 6 | 2–6 |
| Win–loss | 0–1 | 2–4 | 2–3 | 0–4 | 1–3 | 4–3 | 1–2 | 0–2 | 0–1 | 0–1 | 0–0 | 0 / 24 | 10–24 |
National representation
| Summer Olympics | not held | | A | not held | | | | 1R | not held | | A | 0 / 1 | 0–1 |
ATP Masters 1000
| Indian Wells Open | A | A | A | A | QF | 1R | NH | 1R | 2R | 1R | A | 0 / 5 | 3–4 |
| Miami Open | A | A | A | 1R | 2R | 2R | NH | A | A | A | A | 0 / 3 | 2–3 |
| Monte-Carlo Masters | A | A | A | A | 1R | QF | NH | QF | 2R | 2R | A | 0 / 5 | 6–4 |
| Madrid Open | A | A | A | A | 2R | F | NH | 1R | 1R | A | A | 0 / 4 | 4–4 |
| Italian Open | A | A | A | A | 1R | 2R | 2R | 1R | F | A | A | 0 / 5 | 6–4 |
| Canadian Open | A | A | A | A | A | 1R | NH | A | 1R | A | A | 0 / 2 | 0–2 |
| Cincinnati Open | A | A | A | 2R | A | 2R | A | 1R | 1R | A | A | 0 / 4 | 2–4 |
| Shanghai Masters | A | A | A | 1R | 2R | 1R | NH | | | A | A | 0 / 3 | 1–3 |
| Paris Masters | A | A | A | 2R | 1R | A | A | A | A | A | A | 0 / 2 | 1–2 |
| Win–loss | 0–0 | 0–0 | 0–0 | 2–4 | 5–7 | 8–7 | 1–1 | 2–5 | 6–5 | 1–1 | 0–0 | 0 / 33 | 25–30 |
Career statistics
| | 2014 | 2015 | 2016 | 2017 | 2018 | 2019 | 2020 | 2021 | 2022 | 2023 | 2024 | Career | |
| Tournaments | 3 | 14 | 8 | 20 | 21 | 20 | 3 | 9 | 11 | 5 | 1 | 115 | |
| Titles | 0 | 0 | 0 | 0 | 0 | 0 | 0 | 0 | 0 | 0 | 0 | 0 | |
| Finals | 0 | 1 | 1 | 0 | 0 | 2 | 0 | 0 | 1 | 0 | 0 | 5 | |
| Overall win–loss | 1–3 | 11–15 | 8–8 | 7–20 | 10–21 | 18–18 | 2–3 | 2–9 | 7–10 | 2–4 | 0–1 | 68–112 | |
| Win % | 25% | 42% | 50% | 26% | 32% | 50% | 40% | 18% | 41% | 33% | 0% | 38% | |
| Year-end ranking | 124 | 111 | 143 | 148 | 105 | 40 | 51 | 161 | 110 | 342 | – | | |

== Significant finals ==
=== ATP Masters 1000 ===
==== Singles: 1 (1 runner-up) ====
| Result | Year | Tournament | Surface | Opponent | Score |
|---|---|---|---|---|---|
| Loss | 2020 | Italian Open | Clay | (Serbia) Novak Djokovic | 5–7, 3–6 |

==== Doubles: 2 (2 runner-ups) ====
| Result | Year | Tournament | Surface | Partner | Opponent | Score |
|---|---|---|---|---|---|---|
| Loss | 2019 | Madrid Open | Clay | (Austria) Dominic Thiem | (Netherlands) Jean-Julien Rojer (Romania) Horia Tecău | 2–6, 3–6 |
| Loss | 2022 | Italian Open | Clay | (United States) John Isner | (Croatia) Nikola Mektić (Croatia) Mate Pavić | 2–6, 7–6^{(8–6)}, [10–12] |

== ATP Tour finals ==
=== Singles: 14 (4 titles, 10 runner-ups) ===
| Legend Grand Slam tournaments (0–0) ATP Finals (0–0) ATP Masters 1000 (0–1) ATP 500 (1–2) ATP 250 (3–7) | Finals by surface Hard (1–5) Clay (3–5) Grass (0–0) | Finals by setting Outdoor (4–5) Indoor (0–5) |

| Result | W–L | Date | Tournament | Tier | Surface | Opponent | Score |
|---|---|---|---|---|---|---|---|
| Win | 1–0 | May 2016 | Istanbul Open, Turkey | ATP 250 | Clay | (Bulgaria) Grigor Dimitrov | 6–7^{(5–7)}, 7–6^{(7–4)}, 6–0 |
| Loss | 1–1 | Oct 2016 | European Open, Belgium | ATP 250 | Hard (i) | (France) Richard Gasquet | 6–7^{(4–7)}, 1–6 |
| Loss | 1–2 | Oct 2017 | European Open, Belgium | ATP 250 | Hard (i) | (France) Jo-Wilfried Tsonga | 3–6, 5–7 |
| Win | 2–2 | Feb 2018 | Rio Open, Brazil | ATP 500 | Clay | (Spain) Fernando Verdasco | 6–2, 6–3 |
| Loss | 2–3 | Feb 2019 | Argentina Open, Argentina | ATP 250 | Clay | (Italy) Marco Cecchinato | 1–6, 2–6 |
| Win | 3–3 | Aug 2019 | Los Cabos Open, Mexico | ATP 250 | Hard | (United States) Taylor Fritz | 7–6^{(8–6)}, 6–3 |
| Loss | 3–4 | Oct 2019 | Vienna Open, Austria | ATP 500 | Hard (i) | (Austria) Dominic Thiem | 6–3, 4–6, 3–6 |
| Loss | 3–5 | Feb 2020 | Córdoba Open, Argentina | ATP 250 | Clay | (Chile) Cristian Garín | 6–2, 4–6, 0–6 |
| Loss | 3–6 | Sep 2020 | Italian Open, Italy | Masters 1000 | Clay | (Serbia) Novak Djokovic | 5–7, 3–6 |
| Loss | 3–7 | Oct 2020 | Cologne Championship, Germany | ATP 250 | Hard (i) | (Germany) Alexander Zverev | 2–6, 1–6 |
| Win | 4–7 | Mar 2021 | Argentina Open, Argentina | ATP 250 | Clay | (Argentina) Francisco Cerúndolo | 6–1, 6–2 |
| Loss | 4–8 | Oct 2021 | European Open, Belgium | ATP 250 | Hard (i) | (Italy) Jannik Sinner | 2–6, 2–6 |
| Loss | 4–9 | Feb 2022 | Argentina Open, Argentina | ATP 250 | Clay | (Norway) Casper Ruud | 7–5, 2–6, 3–6 |
| Loss | 4–10 | Feb 2022 | Rio Open, Brazil | ATP 500 | Clay | (Spain) Carlos Alcaraz | 4–6, 2–6 |

=== Doubles: 5 (5 runner-ups) ===
| Legend Grand Slam tournaments (0–0) ATP Finals (0–0) ATP Masters 1000 (0–2) ATP 500 (0–0) ATP 250 (0–3) | Finals by surface Hard (0–0) Clay (0–5) Grass (0–0) | Finals by setting Outdoor (0–5) Indoor (0–0) |

| Result | W–L | Date | Tournament | Tier | Surface | Partner | Opponents | Score |
|---|---|---|---|---|---|---|---|---|
| Loss | 0–1 | Feb 2015 | Brasil Open, Brazil | ATP 250 | Clay | (Italy) Paolo Lorenzi | (Colombia) Juan Sebastián Cabal (Colombia) Robert Farah | 4–6, 2–6 |
| Loss | 0–2 | May 2016 | Istanbul Open, Turkey | ATP 250 | Clay | (Argentina) Andrés Molteni | (Italy) Flavio Cipolla (Israel) Dudi Sela | 3–6, 7–5, [7–10] |
| Loss | 0–3 | Feb 2019 | Argentina Open, Argentina | ATP 250 | Clay | (Austria) Dominic Thiem | (Argentina) Máximo González (Argentina) Horacio Zeballos | 1–6, 1–6 |
| Loss | 0–4 | May 2019 | Madrid Open, Spain | Masters 1000 | Clay | (Austria) Dominic Thiem | (Netherlands) Jean-Julien Rojer (Romania) Horia Tecău | 2–6, 3–6 |
| Loss | 0–5 | May 2022 | Italian Open, Italy | Masters 1000 | Clay | (United States) John Isner | (Croatia) Nikola Mektić (Croatia) Mate Pavić | 2–6, 7–6^{(8–6)}, [10–12] |

== ATP Challenger and ITF Futures finals ==
=== Singles: 37 (16–21) ===
| Legend (singles) ATP Challenger Tour (8–11) ITF Futures Tour (8–10) | Titles by surface Hard (0–0) Clay (16–21) Grass (0–0) Carpet (0–0) |

| Result | W–L | Date | Tournament | Tier | Surface | Opponent | Score |
|---|---|---|---|---|---|---|---|
| Loss | 0–1 | Jun 2010 | Argentina F7, Neuquén | Futures | Clay | (Argentina) Andrés Molteni | 4–6, 2–6 |
| Loss | 0–2 | Sep 2010 | Bolivia F1, Tarija | Futures | Clay | (United States) Adam El Mihdawy | 6–7^{(4–7)}, 1–6 |
| Win | 1–2 | Oct 2010 | Bolivia F3, Cochabamba | Futures | Clay | (Bolivia) Mauricio Estívariz | 6–4, 7–5 |
| Loss | 1–3 | Oct 2010 | Bolivia F4, Santa Cruz | Futures | Clay | (Argentina) Renzo Olivo | 5–7, 6–7^{(3–7)} |
| Loss | 1–4 | Oct 2010 | Argentina F21, San Juan | Futures | Clay | (Argentina) Facundo Argüello | 1–6, 1–6 |
| Loss | 1–5 | Apr 2011 | Argentina F1, Arroyito | Futures | Clay | (Argentina) Agustín Velotti | 2–6, 3–6 |
| Loss | 1–6 | May 2011 | Argentina F4, Villa Allende | Futures | Clay | (Argentina) Martín Alund | 4–6, 1–6 |
| Loss | 1–7 | May 2011 | Argentina F5, Villa del Dique | Futures | Clay | (Argentina) Marco Trungelliti | 4–6, 2–6 |
| Loss | 1–8 | Jun 2011 | Argentina F7, Obera | Futures | Clay | (Argentina) Juan-Pablo Amado | 6–4, 4–6, 4–6 |
| Win | 2–8 | Nov 2011 | Chile F14, Villa Alemana | Futures | Clay | (Chile) Guillermo Hormazábal | 6–0, 6–3 |
| Loss | 2–9 | Mar 2012 | Argentina F4, Córdoba | Futures | Clay | (Argentina) Agustín Velotti | 4–6, 2–6 |
| Loss | 2–10 | May 2012 | Argentina F9, Villa Allende | Futures | Clay | (Argentina) Sebastián Decoud | 6–4, 4–6, 3–6 |
| Win | 3–10 | Jun 2012 | Peru F2, Lima | Futures | Clay | (Colombia) Michael Quintero | 6–2, 6–2 |
| Win | 4–10 | Jun 2012 | Argentina F11, San Francisco | Futures | Clay | (Argentina) Facundo Argüello | 6–3, 6–1 |
| Win | 5–10 | Jun 2012 | Argentina F14, Corrientes | Futures | Clay | (Argentina) Facundo Argüello | 6–2, 7–5 |
| Win | 6–10 | Aug 2012 | Argentina F20, Buenos Aires | Futures | Clay | (United States) Andrea Collarini | 7–6^{(7–1)}, 6–3 |
| Win | 7–10 | Aug 2012 | Argentina F21, Rosario | Futures | Clay | (Argentina) Pablo Galdón | 6–2, 7–5 |
| Win | 8–10 | Sep 2012 | Argentina F22, Santiago del Estero | Futures | Clay | (Argentina) Leandro Migani | 2–6, 7–5, 6–3 |
| Win | 9–10 | Oct 2012 | Buenos Aires, Argentina | Challenger | Clay | (France) Guillaume Rufin | 6–1, 7–5 |
| Loss | 9–11 | May 2013 | Tunis, Tunisia | Challenger | Clay | (Romania) Adrian Ungur | 6–4, 0–6, 2–6 |
| Loss | 9–12 | Jun 2013 | Marburg, Germany | Challenger | Clay | (Kazakhstan) Andrey Golubev | 1–6, 3–6 |
| Loss | 9–13 | Sep 2013 | Banja Luka, Bosnia & Herzegovina | Challenger | Clay | (Slovenia) Aljaž Bedene | 3–6, 4–6 |
| Loss | 9–14 | Oct 2013 | San Juan, Argentina | Challenger | Clay | (Argentina) Guido Andreozzi | 7–6^{(7–4)}, 6–7^{(5–7)} 0–6 |
| Loss | 9–15 | Nov 2013 | Montevideo, Uruguay | Challenger | Clay | (Brazil) Thomaz Bellucci | 4–6, 4–6 |
| Loss | 9–16 | Apr 2014 | Itajaí, Brazil | Challenger | Clay | (Argentina) Facundo Argüello | 6–4, 0–6, 4–6 |
| Win | 10–16 | May 2014 | Aix-en-Provence, France | Challenger | Clay | (Germany) Andreas Beck | 6–7, 6–3, 6–2 |
| Win | 11–16 | Aug 2014 | Prague, Czech Republic | Challenger | Clay | (Brazil) André Ghem | 6–4, 7–5 |
| Win | 12–16 | Sep 2014 | Campinas, Brazil | Challenger | Clay | (Brazil) André Ghem | 4–6, 6–4, 7–5 |
| Loss | 12–17 | Sep 2014 | Porto Alegre, Brazil | Challenger | Clay | (Argentina) Carlos Berlocq | 4–6, 6–4, 0–6 |
| Win | 13–17 | Oct 2014 | San Juan, Argentina | Challenger | Clay | (Brazil) João Souza | 7–6, 6–3 |
| Win | 14–17 | Nov 2014 | ATP Challenger Finals, Brazil | Challenger | Clay | (Brazil) Guilherme Clezar | 6–2, 6–3 |
| Loss | 14–18 | Sep 2015 | Campinas, Brazil | Challenger | Clay | (Argentina) Facundo Argüello | 5–7, 3–6 |
| Loss | 14–19 | Oct 2015 | Porto Alegre, Brazil | Challenger | Clay | (Argentina) Guido Pella | 3–6, 6–7^{(5–7)} |
| Loss | 14–20 | Oct 2015 | Corrientes, Argentina | Challenger | Clay | (Argentina) Máximo González | 6–3, 5–7, 4–6 |
| Loss | 14–21 | Nov 2015 | Guayaquil, Ecuador | Challenger | Clay | (Portugal) Gastão Elias | 0–6, 4–6 |
| Win | 15–21 | Sep 2016 | Barranquilla, Colombia | Challenger | Clay | (Brazil) Rogério Dutra Silva | 6–4, 6–1 |
| Win | 16–21 | Nov 2016 | Montevideo, Uruguay | Challenger | Clay | (Brazil) Rogério Dutra Silva | 6–4, 6–1 |

=== Doubles: 22 (16–6) ===
| Legend (doubles) ATP Challenger Tour (5–4) ITF Futures Tour (11–2) | Finals by Surface Hard (0–0) Clay (16–6) Grass (0–0) Carpet (0–0) |

| Result | W–L | Date | Tournament | Tier | Surface | Partner | Opponents | Score |
|---|---|---|---|---|---|---|---|---|
| Loss | 0–1 | Feb 2010 | Argentina F3, Mar del Plata | Futures | Clay | (Argentina) Alejandro Fabbri | (Argentina) Diego Cristin (Argentina) Andrés Molteni | 3–6, 4–6 |
| Win | 1–1 | May 2010 | Argentina F5, Buenos Aires | Futures | Clay | (Argentina) Renzo Olivo | (Argentina) Facundo Argüello (Argentina) Agustín Velotti | 2–6, 6–2, [10–8] |
| Win | 2–1 | Jun 2010 | Argentina F9, Posadas | Futures | Clay | (Argentina) Andrés Molteni | (Argentina) Lionel Noviski (Argentina) Antonio Pastorino | 6–2, 6–3 |
| Win | 3–1 | Jul 2010 | Argentina F11, Obera | Futures | Clay | (Argentina) Andrés Molteni | (Argentina) Gaston Giussani (Argentina) Joaquin-Jesus Monteferrario | 3–6, 6–2, [10–4] |
| Win | 4–1 | Jul 2010 | Argentina F14, Rafaela | Futures | Clay | (Argentina) Andrés Molteni | (Argentina) Facundo Argüello (Argentina) Federico Coria | 6–3, 6–4 |
| Win | 5–1 | Oct 2010 | Argentina F21, San Juan | Futures | Clay | (Argentina) Guillermo Carry | (Argentina) Andres Ceppo (Argentina) Rodrigo Scattareggia | walkover |
| Win | 6–1 | Apr 2011 | Argentina F1, Arroyito | Futures | Clay | (Argentina) Agustín Velotti | (Argentina) Andres Ceppo (Argentina) Agustin Picco | 6–4, 7–5 |
| Win | 7–1 | May 2011 | Argentina F4, Villa Allende | Futures | Clay | (Argentina) Juan-Pablo Amado | (Argentina) Martín Alund (Argentina) Alejandro Kon | 2–6, 6–4, [10–7] |
| Loss | 7–2 | May 2011 | Argentina F5, Villa del Dique | Futures | Clay | (Argentina) Juan-Pablo Amado | (Argentina) Gabriel Alejandro Hidalgo (Argentina) Rodrigo Scattareggia | 0–6, 6–7^{(6–8)} |
| Loss | 7–3 | Nov 2011 | Montevideo, Uruguay | Challenger | Clay | (Uruguay) Marcel Felder | (Serbia) Nikola Ćirić (Montenegro) Goran Tošić | 6–7^{(5–7)}, 6–7^{(4–7)} |
| Win | 8–3 | Mar 2012 | Argentina F3, Mendoza | Futures | Clay | (Argentina) Guillermo Durán | (Argentina) Martín Alund (Argentina) Francisco Bahamonde | 6–2, 7–6^{(7–2)} |
| Win | 9–3 | Mar 2012 | Argentina F4, Córdoba | Futures | Clay | (Argentina) Maximiliano Estévez | (Brazil) Diego Matos (Argentina) Renzo Olivo | 6–1, 6–1 |
| Win | 10–3 | May 2012 | Argentina F9, Villa Allende | Futures | Clay | (Argentina) Sebastián Decoud | (Argentina) Juan Ignacio Londero (Argentina) Leandro Migani | 6–3, 6–4 |
| Win | 11–3 | Jun 2012 | Argentina F11, San Francisco | Futures | Clay | (Argentina) Facundo Argüello | (Uruguay) Martín Cuevas (Argentina) Jose Maria Paniagua | 6–2, 6–2 |
| Win | 12–3 | Oct 2013 | Buenos Aires, Argentina | Challenger | Clay | (Argentina) Máximo González | (Brazil) Rogério Dutra Silva (Brazil) André Ghem | 6–3, 7–5 |
| Win | 13–3 | Apr 2014 | São Paulo, Brazil | Challenger | Clay | (Argentina) Guido Pella | (Argentina) Máximo González (Argentina) Andrés Molteni | 1–6, 6–3, [10–4] |
| Win | 14–3 | May 2014 | Aix-en-Provence, France | Challenger | Clay | (Argentina) Horacio Zeballos | (Germany) Andreas Beck (Austria) Martin Fischer | 6–4, 3–6, [10–5] |
| Loss | 14–4 | Jun 2014 | Marburg, Germany | Challenger | Clay | (Argentina) Horacio Zeballos | (Czech Republic) Jaroslav Pospíšil (Croatia) Franko Škugor | 4–6, 4–6 |
| Win | 15–4 | Sep 2014 | Campinas, Brazil | Challenger | Clay | (Argentina) Facundo Bagnis | (Brazil) André Ghem (Brazil) Fabrício Neis | 7–6^{(7–4)}, 5–7, [10–7] |
| Loss | 15–5 | Sep 2014 | Porto Alegre, Brazil | Challenger | Clay | (Argentina) Facundo Bagnis | (Argentina) Guido Andreozzi (Argentina) Guillermo Durán | 3–6, 3–6 |
| Loss | 15–6 | Oct 2014 | San Juan, Argentina | Challenger | Clay | (Argentina) Horacio Zeballos | (Argentina) Facundo Bagnis (Argentina) Martín Alund | 6–4, 3–6, [7–10] |
| Win | 16–6 | Nov 2016 | Montevideo, Uruguay | Challenger | Clay | (Argentina) Andrés Molteni | (Brazil) Fabiano de Paula (Chile) Cristian Garín | walkover |

== Wins over top 10 players ==
Schwartzman has a 13–53 record against players who were, at the time the match was played, ranked in the top 10.

| Year | 2017 | 2018 | 2019 | 2020 | 2021 | 2022 | 2023 | Total |
|---|---|---|---|---|---|---|---|---|
| Wins | 2 | 1 | 4 | 2 | 1 | 2 | 1 | 13 |

| # | Player | Rk | Event | Surface | Rd | Score | Rk | Ref |
|---|---|---|---|---|---|---|---|---|
2017
| 1. | (Austria) Dominic Thiem | 7 | Canadian Open, Canada | Hard | 2R | 6–4, 6–7^{(7–9)}, 7–5 | 36 | |
| 2. | (Croatia) Marin Čilić | 7 | US Open, United States | Hard | 3R | 4–6, 7–5, 7–5, 6–4 | 33 | |
2018
| 3. | (South Africa) Kevin Anderson | 7 | French Open, France | Clay | 4R | 1–6, 2–6, 7–5, 7–6^{(7–0)}, 6–2 | 12 | |
2019
| 4. | (Austria) Dominic Thiem | 8 | Argentina Open, Argentina | Clay | SF | 2–6, 6–4, 7–6^{(7–5)} | 19 | |
| 5. | (Japan) Kei Nishikori | 6 | Italian Open, Italy | Clay | QF | 6–4, 6–2 | 24 | |
| 6. | (Germany) Alexander Zverev | 6 | US Open, United States | Hard | 4R | 3–6, 6–2, 6–4, 6–3 | 21 | |
| 7. | (Russia) Karen Khachanov | 9 | Vienna Open, Austria | Hard (i) | QF | 7–6^{(8–6)}, 6–2 | 15 | |
2020
| 8. | (Spain) Rafael Nadal | 2 | Italian Open, Italy | Clay | QF | 6–2, 7–5 | 15 | |
| 9. | (Austria) Dominic Thiem | 3 | French Open, France | Clay | QF | 7–6^{(7–1)}, 5–7, 6–7^{(6–8)}, 7–6^{(7–5)}, 6–2 | 14 | |
2021
| 10. | (Norway) Casper Ruud | 10 | Indian Wells, United States | Hard | 4R | 6–3, 6–3 | 15 | |
2022
| 11. | (Greece) Stefanos Tsitsipas | 4 | ATP Cup, Australia | Hard | RR | 6–7^{(5–7)}, 6–3, 6–3 | 13 | |
| 12. | (Canada) Félix Auger-Aliassime | 9 | Barcelona Open, Spain | Clay | QF | 3–6, 6–2, 6–3 | 15 | |
2023
| 13. | (United States) Taylor Fritz | 8 | Shanghai Masters, China | Hard | 3R | 6–4, 3–6, 7–6^{(7–5)} | 130 | |

- Key: (Rk) first use, opponent rank; (Rd) round; (Rk) 2nd use, player rank; (Ref) reference; (F) final; (SF) semifinal; (QF) quarterfinal; (#R) rounds 4, 3, 2, 1; (RR) round-robin stage; (Q#) qualifying rounds or stages (3), 2, 1.

== Career Grand Slam tournament seedings ==
Not seeded at all, or not seeded inside the top 10 Seeded 10–4 Seeded no. 3 Seeded no. 2 Seeded no. 1

| Year | Australian Open | French Open | Wimbledon | US Open |
|---|---|---|---|---|
| 2014 | did not qualify | not seeded | did not play | not seeded |
| 2015 | not seeded | not seeded | not seeded | not seeded |
| 2016 | not seeded | not seeded | not seeded | not seeded |
| 2017 | not seeded | not seeded | not seeded | 29th |
| 2018 | 24th | 11th | 14th | 13th |
| 2019 | 14th | 17th | 24th | 20th |
| 2020 | 14th | 12th | tournament cancelled* | 9th |
| 2021 | 8th | 10th | 9th | 11th |
| 2022 | 13th | 15th | 12th | 14th |
| 2023 | 23rd | not seeded | not seeded | not seeded |
| 2024 | did not qualify | did not qualify | did not qualify | not seeded |
| 2025 | did not play | did not play | did not play | did not play |

* The 2020 Wimbledon Championships was cancelled due to the COVID-19 pandemic.

== National and international participation ==
=== Team competitions finals: 3 (1 title, 2 runner-ups) ===
| Finals by tournament Davis Cup (0–0) Laver Cup (1–2) | Finals by team Argentina (0–0) World (1–2) |

| Result | Year | Tournament | Team | Partner(s) | Opponent team | Opponent players | Surface | Score |
|---|---|---|---|---|---|---|---|---|
| Loss | 2018 | Laver Cup, Chicago | Team World | Kevin Anderson; John Isner; Jack Sock; Nick Kyrgios; Frances Tiafoe | Team Europe | Roger Federer; Novak Djokovic; Alexander Zverev; Grigor Dimitrov; David Goffin; Kyle Edmund | Hard (i) | 8–13 |
| Loss | 2021 | Laver Cup, Boston | Team World | Félix Auger-Aliassime; Denis Shapovalov; Reilly Opelka; John Isner; Nick Kyrgios | Team Europe | Daniil Medvedev; Stefanos Tsitsipas; Alexander Zverev; Andrey Rublev; Matteo Berrettini; Casper Ruud | Hard (i) | 1–14 |
| Win | 2022 | Laver Cup, London | Team World | Taylor Fritz; Félix Auger-Aliassime; Frances Tiafoe; Alex de Minaur; Jack Sock | Team Europe | Casper Ruud; Rafael Nadal; Stefanos Tsitsipas; Novak Djokovic; Andy Murray; Roger Federer; Matteo Berrettini; Cameron Norrie | Hard (i) | 13–8 |
