= 2012 Copa San Juan Gobierno – Singles =

Singles
- 2012 Copa San Juan Gobierno

Final
- Champion: (Netherlands) Thiemo de Bakker
- Runner-up: (Argentina) Martín Alund
- Score: 6–2, 3–6, 6–2

Events
Singles	Doubles
← 2011 ·	Copa San Juan Gobierno	· 2013 →

Thiemo de Bakker won the final 6–2, 3–6, 6–2 against Martín Alund.

== Seeds ==
1. (Argentina) Leonardo Mayer (first round)
2. (Portugal) João Sousa (first round)
3. (Argentina) Guido Pella (second round)
4. (Argentina) Horacio Zeballos (first round)
5. (France) Guillaume Rufin (semifinals)
6. (Brazil) Rogério Dutra da Silva (quarterfinals)
7. (Portugal) Frederico Gil (first round)
8. (Argentina) Martín Alund (final)

== Draw ==
=== Key ===
- Q = Qualifier
- WC = Wild card
- LL = Lucky loser
- Alt = Alternate
- SE = Special exempt
- PR = Protected ranking
- ITF = ITF entry
- JE = Junior exempt
- w/o = Walkover
- r = Retired
- d = Defaulted
- SR = Special ranking

=== Finals ===
Semifinals
5	(France) Guillaume Rufin	4	7^{7}	1
(Netherlands) Thiemo de Bakker	6	6^{4}	6
(Spain) Iván Navarro	3	2
8	(Argentina) Martín Alund	6	6

Final
(Netherlands) Thiemo de Bakker	6	3	6
8	(Argentina) Martín Alund	2	6	2

=== Top half ===
First round
1	(Argentina) L Mayer	3	6	4
(Argentina) M González	6	4	6
(Spain) J Martí	6	4	6
(Portugal) P Sousa	1	6	4
WC	(Argentina) Facundo Alvo	1	2
Q	(Argentina) Leandro Migani	6	6
(Argentina) F Bagnis	6	4	4
5	(France) G Rufin	0	6	6
4	(Argentina) H Zeballos	5	2
(Netherlands) T de Bakker	7	6
WC	(Argentina) Diego Schwartzman	5	2
(Argentina) F Argüello	7	6
(Netherlands) B Westerhof	6	7^{8}
WC	(Argentina) R Olivo	3	6^{6}
Q	(France) S Robert	6	6
7	(Portugal) F Gil	4	0

Second round
(Argentina) M González	6	6
(Spain) J Martí	4	3
Q	(Argentina) Leandro Migani	6	6^{2}	0
5	(France) G Rufin	2	7^{7}	6
(Netherlands) T de Bakker	6	7^{9}
(Argentina) F Argüello	4	6^{7}
(Netherlands) B Westerhof	6	6
Q	(France) S Robert	1	4

Quarterfinals
(Argentina) M González	5	0
5	(France) G Rufin	7	6
(Netherlands) T de Bakker	7^{7}	6
(Netherlands) B Westerhof	6^{4}	4

Semifinals
5	(France) G Rufin	4	7^{7}	1
(Netherlands) T de Bakker	6	6^{4}	6

=== Bottom half ===
First round
6	(Brazil) R Dutra da Silva	6	6
(Chile) P Capdeville	2	0
SE	(Brazil) R Hocevar	4	4
(Argentina) G Andreozzi	6	6
(Spain) I Navarro	7^{7}	7^{7}
(Australia) J-P Smith	6^{3}	6^{4}
Q	(Netherlands) T Schoorel	6^{5}	4
3	(Argentina) G Pella	7^{7}	6
8	(Argentina) M Alund	7	7
WC	(Argentina) D Junqueira	5	5
(Argentina) M Trungelliti	7	4	7
(Argentina) E Schwank	5	6	5
Q	(United States) A Collarini	6	6
SE	(Chile) N Massú	1	0
(Portugal) G Elias	6	4	6
2	(Portugal) J Sousa	4	6	1

Second round
6	(Brazil) R Dutra da Silva	6	6
(Argentina) G Andreozzi	4	2
(Spain) I Navarro	6	6
3	(Argentina) G Pella	3	2
8	(Argentina) M Alund	7	6
(Argentina) M Trungelliti	5	2
Q	(United States) A Collarini	4	4
(Portugal) G Elias	6	6

Quarterfinals
6	(Brazil) R Dutra da Silva	6^{0}	6	2
(Spain) I Navarro	7^{7}	1	6
8	(Argentina) M Alund	6^{5}	6	6
(Portugal) G Elias	7^{7}	3	2

Semifinals
(Spain) I Navarro	3	2
8	(Argentina) M Alund	6	6
