= 2013 Copa San Juan Gobierno – Doubles =

Doubles
- 2013 Copa San Juan Gobierno

Final
- Champions: (Argentina) Guillermo Durán; (Argentina) Máximo González
- Runners-up: (Argentina) Martín Alund; (Argentina) Facundo Bagnis
- Score: 6–3, 6–0

Events
Singles	Doubles
← 2012 ·	Copa San Juan Gobierno	· 2014 →

Martín Alund and Horacio Zeballos were the defending champions but Zeballos chose not to compete.
Alund partnered with Facundo Bagnis and lost in the final to compatriots Guillermo Durán and Máximo González 6–3, 6–0.

== Seeds ==
1. (Argentina) Martín Alund / (Argentina) Facundo Bagnis (final)
2. (Argentina) Guido Andreozzi / (Argentina) Eduardo Schwank (first round)
3. (Argentina) Renzo Olivo / (Argentina) Marco Trungelliti (semifinals)
4. (Russia) Andrey Kuznetsov / (Spain) Rubén Ramírez Hidalgo (withdrew)

== Draw ==
=== Key ===
- Q = Qualifier
- WC = Wild card
- LL = Lucky loser
- Alt = Alternate
- SE = Special exempt
- PR = Protected ranking
- ITF = ITF entry
- JE = Junior exempt
- w/o = Walkover
- r = Retired
- d = Defaulted
- SR = Special ranking

=== Draw ===
First round

Quarterfinals

Semifinals

Final

1
- (Argentina) M Alund
- (Argentina) F Bagnis
6
6

WC
(Argentina) Francisco Bahamonde
(Argentina) Facundo Jofre
2
0

1
- (Argentina) M Alund
- (Argentina) F Bagnis

WC
- (Argentina) Facundo Alvo
- (Argentina) P Cachin
w.o

(Argentina) M Estévez
(Argentina) M Martinez
w.o

(Argentina) Maximiliano Estévez
(Argentina) Mateo Martinez

1
- (Argentina) M Alund
- (Argentina) F Bagnis
6
6^{4}
[10]

Alt
- (Argentina) Sebastian Bettiol
- (Argentina) G Villanueva
4
4

- (Chile) C Garin
- (Ecuador) E Gómez
3
7^{7}
[6]

- (Chile) C Garin
- (Ecuador) E Gómez
6
6

- (Chile) C Garin
- (Ecuador) E Gómez
6
7

(Argentina) Raul Guardia
(Argentina) Guillermo Riccitelli
1
0

- (Argentina) GA Hidalgo
- (Italy) S Travaglia
4
5

- (Argentina) Gabriel Alejandro Hidalgo
- (Italy) S Travaglia
6
6

1
- (Argentina) M Alund
- (Argentina) F Bagnis
3
0

- (Argentina) P Heras
- (Argentina) A Molteni
3
7
[7]

- (Argentina) G Durán
- (Argentina) M González
6
6

- (Chile) G Lama
- (Argentina) JI Londero
6
5
[10]

- (Chile) G Lama
- (Argentina) JI Londero
2
4

(Argentina) T Lipovšek Puches
(Argentina) Joaquin Monteferrario
4
6^{4}

3
- (Argentina) R Olivo
- (Argentina) M Trungelliti
6
6

3
- (Argentina) R Olivo
- (Argentina) M Trungelliti
6
7^{7}

3
- (Argentina) R Olivo
- (Argentina) M Trungelliti
1
4

- (Argentina) A Collarini
- (Argentina) D Schwartzman
6
2
[7]

- (Argentina) G Durán
- (Argentina) M González
6
6

PR
(Argentina) P Galdón
(France) Laurent Rochette
4
6
[10]

PR
(Argentina) P Galdón
(France) L Rochette
w.o

- (Argentina) G Durán
- (Argentina) M González
6
6

- (Argentina) G Durán
- (Argentina) M González

2
- (Argentina) G Andreozzi
- (Argentina) E Schwank
3
2
