= 2012 Copa San Juan Gobierno – Doubles =

Doubles
- 2012 Copa San Juan Gobierno

Final
- Champions: (Argentina) Martín Alund (Argentina) Horacio Zeballos
- Runners-up: (United States) Nicholas Monroe (Germany) Simon Stadler
- Score: 3–6, 6–2, [14–12]

Events
Singles	Doubles
← 2011 ·	Copa San Juan Gobierno	· 2013 →

Martín Alund and Horacio Zeballos won the final by defeating Nicholas Monroe and Simon Stadler 3–6, 6–2, [14–12].

== Seeds ==
1. (United States) Nicholas Monroe / (Germany) Simon Stadler
2. (Australia) John Peers / (Australia) John-Patrick Smith (semifinals)
3. (Argentina) Martín Alund / (Argentina) Horacio Zeballos (champions)
4. (Argentina) Máximo González / (Argentina) Eduardo Schwank (first round)

== Draw ==
=== Key ===
- Q = Qualifier
- WC = Wild card
- LL = Lucky loser
- Alt = Alternate
- SE = Special exempt
- PR = Protected ranking
- ITF = ITF entry
- JE = Junior exempt
- w/o = Walkover
- r = Retired
- d = Defaulted
- SR = Special ranking

=== Draw ===
First round
1	(United States) N Monroe (Germany) S Stadler	6	7^{7}
(Chile) P Capdeville (Argentina) D Junqueira	2	6^{3}
(Spain) J Martí (Argentina) R Olivo	2	5
(Argentina) F Argüello (Spain) I Navarro	6	7
4	(Argentina) M González (Argentina) E Schwank	4	7	[7]
(Portugal) F Gil (Portugal) P Sousa	6	5	[10]
WC	(Argentina) Juan Ignacio Londero (Argentina) Leandro Migani	6	1	[10]
(Argentina) G Andreozzi (Argentina) Diego Schwartzmann	3	6	[6]
WC	(Argentina) L Mayer (Argentina) Martin Rios-Benitez	6^{3}	6	[9]
(Portugal) G Elias (Portugal) J Sousa	7^{7}	0	[11]
WC	(Argentina) Raul Guardia (Argentina) Juan Forcada	2	1
3	(Argentina) M Alund (Argentina) H Zeballos	6	6
(Argentina) F Bagnis (Argentina) G Pella	7^{7}	6
Alt	(Spain) Ó Burrieza-López (Portugal) B Mota	6^{0}	4
(Montenegro) G Tošić (United States) D Zivkovic	2	1
2	(Australia) J Peers (Australia) J-P Smith	6	6

Quarterfinals
1	(United States) N Monroe (Germany) S Stadler	6	6
(Argentina) F Argüello (Spain) I Navarro	2	3
(Portugal) F Gil (Portugal) P Sousa	3	7	[10]
WC	(Argentina) Juan Ignacio Londero (Argentina) Leandro Migani	6	5	[6]
(Portugal) G Elias (Portugal) J Sousa	6^{2}	6	[10]
3	(Argentina) M Alund (Argentina) H Zeballos	7^{7}	3	[12]
(Argentina) F Bagnis (Argentina) G Pella	6	3	[8]
2	(Australia) J Peers (Australia) J-P Smith	4	6	[10]

Semifinals
1	(United States) N Monroe (Germany) S Stadler	7	6
(Portugal) F Gil (Portugal) P Sousa	5	4
3	(Argentina) M Alund (Argentina) H Zeballos	2	6	[10]
2	(Australia) J Peers (Australia) J-P Smith	6	3	[7]

Final
1	(United States) N Monroe (Germany) S Stadler	6	2	[12]
3	(Argentina) M Alund (Argentina) H Zeballos	3	6	[14]
