= 2014 Copa San Juan Gobierno – Singles =

Singles
- 2014 Copa San Juan Gobierno

Final
- Champion: (Argentina) Diego Schwartzman
- Runner-up: (Brazil) João Souza
- Score: 7–6^{(7–5)}, 6–3

Events
Singles	Doubles
← 2013 ·	Copa San Juan Gobierno	· 2015 →

Guido Andreozzi was the defending champion, but lost in the quarterfinals to Diego Sebastián Schwartzman.

Diego Schwartzman won the title by defeating João Souza 7–6^{(7–5)}, 6–3 in the final.

== Seeds ==
1. (Argentina) Diego Sebastián Schwartzman (champion)
2. (Brazil) João Souza (final)
3. (Colombia) Alejandro González (semifinals)
4. (Argentina) Horacio Zeballos (first round)
5. (Argentina) Facundo Bagnis (quarterfinals)
6. (Argentina) Facundo Argüello (semifinals)
7. (Netherlands) Thiemo de Bakker (first round)
8. (Argentina) Guido Andreozzi (quarterfinals)

== Draw ==
=== Key ===
- Q = Qualifier
- WC = Wild card
- LL = Lucky loser
- Alt = Alternate
- SE = Special exempt
- PR = Protected ranking
- ITF = ITF entry
- JE = Junior exempt
- w/o = Walkover
- r = Retired
- d = Defaulted
- SR = Special ranking

=== Finals ===
Semifinals
1	(Argentina) Diego Schwartzman	6	6
6	(Argentina) Facundo Argüello	4	3
3	(Colombia) Alejandro González	1	1
2	(Brazil) João Souza	6	6

Final
1	(Argentina) Diego Schwartzman	7^{7}	6
2	(Brazil) João Souza	6^{5}	3

=== Top half ===
First round
1	(Argentina) D Schwartzman	4	6	6
(Argentina) R Olivo	6	3	1
(Argentina) JI Londero	7^{7}	3	5
(Dominican Republic) J Hernández	6^{3}	6	7
(Australia) J Kubler	6	7
(Brazil) G Clezar	3	5
Q	(Bolivia) H Dellien	1	6^{4}
8	(Argentina) G Andreozzi	6	7^{7}
4	(Argentina) H Zeballos	3	4
WC	(Argentina) M Trungelliti	6	6
(Brazil) A Ghem	6^{5}	6	6
Q	(Italy) D Gennaro	7^{7}	3	1
(Spain) R Ramírez Hidalgo	6^{3}	2
WC	(Argentina) N Kicker	7^{7}	6
(Argentina) A Collarini	1	6	6^{3}
6	(Argentina) F Argüello	6	2	7^{7}

Second round
1	(Argentina) D Schwartzman	6	6
(Dominican Republic) J Hernández	4	3
(Australia) J Kubler	3	2
8	(Argentina) G Andreozzi	6	6
WC	(Argentina) M Trungelliti	4	6	4
(Brazil) A Ghem	6	0	6
WC	(Argentina) N Kicker	6^{7}	3
6	(Argentina) F Argüello	7^{9}	6

Quarterfinals
1	(Argentina) D Schwartzman	2	7^{7}	7^{7}
8	(Argentina) G Andreozzi	6	6^{4}	6^{5}
(Brazil) A Ghem	1	r
6	(Argentina) F Argüello	6

Semifinals
1	(Argentina) D Schwartzman	6	6
6	(Argentina) F Argüello	4	3

=== Bottom half ===
First round
5	(Argentina) F Bagnis	6	6
(Chile) G Lama	3	4
WC	(Argentina) Facundo Alvo	4	2
WC	(Argentina) P Cachin	6	6
(Spain) J Samper-Montana	7^{9}	6
(Argentina) A Molteni	6^{7}	3
(Argentina) G Pella	6^{5}	4
3	(Colombia) A González	7^{7}	6
7	(Netherlands) T de Bakker	3	4
Q	(France) G Mina	6	6
(Bosnia and Herzegovina) T Brkić	2	7^{7}	2
(Argentina) M Alund	6	6^{5}	6
(Belgium) A De Greef	1	4
(Chile) N Jarry	6	6
(Chile) H Podlipnik Castillo	5	3
2	(Brazil) J Souza	7	6

Second round
5	(Argentina) F Bagnis	6	6
WC	(Argentina) P Cachin	3	2
(Spain) J Samper-Montana	6	4	2
3	(Colombia) A González	4	6	6
Q	(France) G Mina	2	2
(Argentina) M Alund	6	6
(Chile) N Jarry	0	2
2	(Brazil) J Souza	6	6

Quarterfinals
5	(Argentina) F Bagnis	5	6	3
3	(Colombia) A González	7	4	6
(Argentina) M Alund	4	2
2	(Brazil) J Souza	6	6

Semifinals
3	(Colombia) A González	1	1
2	(Brazil) J Souza	6	6
