= 2014 Copa San Juan Gobierno – Doubles =

Doubles
- 2014 Copa San Juan Gobierno

Final
- Champion: (Argentina) Martín Alund; (Argentina) Facundo Bagnis
- Runner-up: (Argentina) Diego Schwartzman; (Argentina) Horacio Zeballos
- Score: 4–6, 6–3, [10–7]

Events
Singles	Doubles
← 2013 ·	Copa San Juan Gobierno	· 2015 →

Guillermo Durán and Máximo González were the defending champions, but González chose not to play this year. Guillermo Durán played alongside Andrés Molteni and lost in the first round to Guido Andreozzi and Guido Pella.

Martín Alund and Facundo Bagnis won the title by defeating Diego Schwartzman and Horacio Zeballos 4–6, 6–3, [10–7] in the final.

== Seeds ==
1. (Argentina) Diego Schwartzman / (Argentina) Horacio Zeballos (final)
2. (Argentina) Guillermo Durán / (Argentina) Andrés Molteni (first round)
3. (Argentina) Martín Alund / (Argentina) Facundo Bagnis (champions)
4. (Colombia) Alejandro González / (Mexico) César Ramírez (first round)

== Draw ==
=== Key ===
- Q = Qualifier
- WC = Wild card
- LL = Lucky loser
- Alt = Alternate
- SE = Special exempt
- PR = Protected ranking
- ITF = ITF entry
- JE = Junior exempt
- w/o = Walkover
- r = Retired
- d = Defaulted
- SR = Special ranking

=== Draw ===
First round

Quarterfinals

Semifinals

Final

1
- (Argentina) D Schwartzman
- (Argentina) H Zeballos
7^{7}
6

WC
- (Argentina) F Coria
- (Argentina) F Mena
6^{1}
2

1
- (Argentina) D Schwartzman
- (Argentina) H Zeballos
6
6

- (Uruguay) A Behar
- (Australia) J Kubler
5
6^{4}

- (Peru) S Galdós
- (Argentina) R Olivo
3
4

- (Peru) S Galdós
- (Argentina) R Olivo
7
7^{7}

1
- (Argentina) D Schwartzman
- (Argentina) H Zeballos
7
6

4
- (Colombia) A González
- (Mexico) C Ramírez
4
6^{3}

WC
- (Argentina) F Argüello
- (Argentina) T Lipovšek Puches
5
4

WC
- (Argentina) Facundo Alvo
- (Argentina) M Trungelliti
6
7^{7}

WC
- (Argentina) F Alvo
- (Argentina) M Trungelliti
1
4

WC
- (Argentina) F Argüello
- (Argentina) T Lipovšek Puches
7^{10}
6

WC
- (Argentina) F Argüello
- (Argentina) T Lipovšek Puches
6
6

- (Belgium) A De Greef
- (Chile) H Podlipnik Castillo
6^{8}
3

1
- (Argentina) D Schwartzman
- (Argentina) H Zeballos
6
3
[7]

- (Brazil) G Clezar
- (Chile) G Lama
6
6

3
- (Argentina) M Alund
- (Argentina) F Bagnis
4
6
[10]

- (Spain) RR Hidalgo
- (Spain) J Samper Montaña
3
4

- (Brazil) G Clezar
- (Chile) G Lama
4
7^{7}
[9]

- (Bolivia) H Dellien
- (Argentina) JI Londero
5
2

3
- (Argentina) M Alund
- (Argentina) F Bagnis
6
6^{3}
[11]

3
- (Argentina) M Alund
- (Argentina) F Bagnis
7
6

3
- (Argentina) M Alund
- (Argentina) F Bagnis
7^{7}
6

- (Brazil) M Demoliner
- (Chile) N Jarry
7^{7}
6^{6}
[10]

- (Brazil) M Demoliner
- (Chile) N Jarry
6^{4}
1

- (Brazil) A Ghem
- (Brazil) J Souza
6^{5}
7^{8}
[5]

- (Brazil) M Demoliner
- (Chile) N Jarry
6
6

- (Argentina) G Andreozzi
- (Argentina) G Pella
5
6
[11]

- (Argentina) G Andreozzi
- (Argentina) G Pella
4
3

2
- (Argentina) G Durán
- (Argentina) A Molteni
7
3
[9]
