= 2013 Copa San Juan Gobierno =

- Date: 7 – 13 October
- Edition: 2nd
- Surface: Clay
- Location: San Juan, Argentina

Champions

Singles
- (Argentina) Guido Andreozzi

Doubles
- (Argentina) Guillermo Durán / (Argentina) Máximo González
← 2012 ·	Copa San Juan Gobierno	· 2014 →

The 2013 Copa San Juan Gobierno was a professional tennis tournament played on clay courts. It was the second edition of the tournament which was part of the 2013 ATP Challenger Tour. It took place in San Juan, Argentina between 7 and 13 October 2013.

== Singles main draw entrants ==
=== Seeds ===
Country	Player	Rank^{1}	Seed
ARG	Diego Schwartzman	112	1
ARG	Martín Alund	121	2
RUS	Andrey Kuznetsov	144	3
ESP	Rubén Ramírez Hidalgo	145	4
ARG	Facundo Bagnis	151	5
ARG	Máximo González	166	6
ARG	Facundo Argüello	168	7
ARG	Guido Andreozzi	180	8

- ^{1} Rankings are as of September 30, 2013.

=== Other entrants ===
The following players received wildcards into the singles main draw:

- (Argentina) Facundo Alvo
- (Argentina) Pedro Cachin
- (Argentina) Tomás Lipovšek Puches
- (Argentina) Mateo Nicolás Martínez

The following players used protected ranking to get into the singles main draw:

- (France) Laurent Rochette

The following players received entry from the qualifying draw:

- (Argentina) Francisco Bahamonde
- (Argentina) Gabriel Hidalgo
- (Argentina) Joaquin Monteferrario
- (Argentina) Gonzalo Villanueva

== Champions ==
=== Singles ===
- (Argentina) Guido Andreozzi def. (Argentina) Diego Schwartzman 6–7^{(5–7)}, 7–6^{(7–4)}, 6–0

=== Doubles ===
- (Argentina) Guillermo Durán / (Argentina) Máximo González def. (Argentina) Martín Alund / (Argentina) Facundo Bagnis 6–3, 6–0
