= 2022 Mutua Madrid Open – Men's singles =

Men's singles
- 2022 Mutua Madrid Open

Final
- Champion: (Spain) Carlos Alcaraz
- Runner-up: (Germany) Alexander Zverev
- Score: 6–3, 6–1

Details
- Draw: 56
- Seeds: 16

Events
Singles	men	women
Doubles	men	women
← 2021 ·	Madrid Open	· 2023 →

Carlos Alcaraz defeated defending champion Alexander Zverev in the final, 6–3, 6–1 to win the men's singles tennis title at the 2022 Madrid Open. It was his second Masters 1000 title. Alcaraz was the first man to defeat Rafael Nadal and Novak Djokovic in the same clay court tournament, which he did in the quarterfinals and semifinals, respectively.

Djokovic and Daniil Medvedev were in contention for the world No. 1 singles ranking. Djokovic retained the top ranking by reaching the third round. He became the first player to record at least 30 singles wins at all nine Masters 1000 events.

The semifinal match between Carlos Alcaraz and Novak Djokovic was named by the Association of Tennis Professionals as the ATP Match of the Year.

== Seeds ==
The top eight seeds received a bye into the second round.

1. (Serbia) Novak Djokovic (semifinals)
2. (Germany) Alexander Zverev (final)
3. (Spain) Rafael Nadal (quarterfinals)
4. (Greece) Stefanos Tsitsipas (semifinals)
5. (Norway) Casper Ruud (second round)
6. Andrey Rublev (quarterfinals)
7. (Spain) Carlos Alcaraz (champion)
8. (Canada) Félix Auger-Aliassime (quarterfinals)
9. (United Kingdom) Cameron Norrie (third round)
10. (Italy) Jannik Sinner (third round)
11. (United States) Taylor Fritz (withdrew)
12. (Poland) Hubert Hurkacz (quarterfinals)
13. (Argentina) Diego Schwartzman (second round)
14. (Canada) Denis Shapovalov (second round)
15. (United States) Reilly Opelka (first round)
16. (Spain) Pablo Carreño Busta (first round)
17. (Spain) Roberto Bautista Agut (second round)

Click on the seed number of a player to go to their draw section.

== Draw ==
=== Key ===
- Q = Qualifier
- WC = Wild card
- LL = Lucky loser
- Alt = Alternate
- ITF = ITF entry
- PR = Protected ranking
- SR = Special ranking
- SE = Special exempt
- JE = Junior exempt
- JR = Junior Accelerator Programme entrant
- CO = College Accelerator Programme entrant
- NG = Next Gen Accelerator Program entrant
- w/o = Walkover
- r = Retired
- d = Defaulted

=== Finals ===
Quarterfinals
1	(Serbia) Novak Djokovic	6	6
12	(Poland) Hubert Hurkacz	3	4
3	(Spain) Rafael Nadal	2	6	3
7	(Spain) Carlos Alcaraz	6	1	6
6	Andrey Rublev	3	6	4
4	(Greece) Stefanos Tsitsipas	6	2	6
8	(Canada) Félix Auger-Aliassime	3	5
2	(Germany) Alexander Zverev	6	7

Semifinals
1	(Serbia) Novak Djokovic	7^{7}	5	6^{5}
7	(Spain) Carlos Alcaraz	6^{5}	7	7^{7}
4	(Greece) Stefanos Tsitsipas	4	6	2
2	(Germany) Alexander Zverev	6	3	6

Final
7	(Spain) Carlos Alcaraz	6	6
2	(Germany) Alexander Zverev	3	1

=== Top half ===
==== Section 1 ====
First round
WC	(Spain) C Gimeno Valero	3	0
(France) G Monfils	6	6
WC	(United Kingdom) A Murray	6	6
PR	(Austria) D Thiem	3	4
LL	(France) U Humbert	6^{1}	3
14	(Canada) D Shapovalov	7^{7}	6
12	(Poland) H Hurkacz	7	6^{11}	6
Q	(Bolivia) H Dellien	5	7^{13}	3
(South Africa) L Harris	5	3
(Spain) A Davidovich Fokina	7	6
PR	(Croatia) B Ćorić	3	6	4
Q	(Serbia) D Lajović	6	4	6

Second round
1	(Serbia) N Djokovic	6	6
(France) G Monfils	3	2
WC	(United Kingdom) A Murray	6	3	6
14	(Canada) D Shapovalov	1	6	2
12	(Poland) H Hurkacz	6	4	7^{7}
(Spain) A Davidovich Fokina	4	6	6^{5}
Q	(Serbia) D Lajović	7^{9}	2	6
5	(Norway) C Ruud	6^{7}	6	4

Third round
1	(Serbia) N Djokovic	w/o
WC	(United Kingdom) A Murray
12	(Poland) H Hurkacz	7	6
Q	(Serbia) D Lajović	5	3

Quarterfinals
1	(Serbia) N Djokovic	6	6
12	(Poland) H Hurkacz	3	4

==== Section 2 ====
First round
(Serbia) M Kecmanović	6	7
(Kazakhstan) A Bublik	4	5
A Karatsev	2	5
Q	(Belgium) D Goffin	6	7
(Netherlands) B van de Zandschulp	6^{6}	7^{7}	6
16	(Spain) P Carreño Busta	7^{8}	6^{1}	3
9	(United Kingdom) C Norrie	7	7
Q	(South Korea) S-w Kwon	5	5
(Serbia) F Krajinović	6^{8}	4
(United States) J Isner	7^{10}	6
(Georgia (country)) N Basilashvili	7	6
(Italy) F Fognini	5	4

Second round
3	(Spain) R Nadal	6	7^{7}
(Serbia) M Kecmanović	1	6^{4}
Q	(Belgium) D Goffin	6	6
(Netherlands) B van de Zandschulp	4	2
9	(United Kingdom) C Norrie	6	6^{5}	6
(United States) J Isner	4	7^{7}	4
(Georgia (country)) N Basilashvili	3	5
7	(Spain) C Alcaraz	6	7

Third round
3	(Spain) R Nadal	6	5	7^{11}
Q	(Belgium) D Goffin	3	7	6^{9}
9	(United Kingdom) C Norrie	4	7^{7}	3
7	(Spain) C Alcaraz	6	6^{4}	6

Quarterfinals
3	(Spain) R Nadal	2	6	3
7	(Spain) C Alcaraz	6	1	6

=== Bottom half ===
==== Section 3 ====
First round
(Italy) L Sonego	4	3
WC	(United Kingdom) J Draper	6	6
(United Kingdom) D Evans	6	6
(Argentina) F Delbonis	3	4
(United States) J Brooksby	0	2
17	(Spain) R Bautista Agut	6	6
13	(Argentina) D Schwartzman	6	6^{5}	6
Q	(France) B Paire	2	7^{7}	1
(Bulgaria) G Dimitrov	6	7^{7}
Q	(United States) M Cressy	2	6^{4}
WC	(France) L Pouille	6	6
K Khachanov	3	4

Second round
6	A Rublev	2	6	7
WC	(United Kingdom) J Draper	6	4	5
(United Kingdom) D Evans	6	5	7^{7}
17	(Spain) R Bautista Agut	3	7	6^{2}
13	(Argentina) D Schwartzman	0	3
(Bulgaria) G Dimitrov	6	6
WC	(France) L Pouille	3	4
4	(Greece) S Tsitsipas	6	6

Third round
6	A Rublev	7^{9}	7
(United Kingdom) D Evans	6^{7}	5
(Bulgaria) G Dimitrov	3	4
4	(Greece) S Tsitsipas	6	6

Quarterfinals
6	A Rublev	3	6	4
4	(Greece) S Tsitsipas	6	2	6

==== Section 4 ====
First round
(United States) F Tiafoe	1	3
(Chile) C Garín	6	6
(Australia) A de Minaur	7^{7}	1	6
(Spain) P Martínez	6^{2}	6	3
(United States) T Paul	7^{7}	6^{4}	3
10	(Italy) J Sinner	6^{4}	7^{7}	6
15	(United States) R Opelka	3	5
(United States) S Korda	6	7
I Ivashka	6	3	5
Q	(Italy) L Musetti	2	6	7
(Croatia) M Čilić	6	3	6
(Spain) A Ramos Viñolas	3	6	4

Second round
8	(Canada) F Auger-Aliassime	6	6
(Chile) C Garín	3	0
(Australia) A de Minaur	4	1
10	(Italy) J Sinner	6	6
(United States) S Korda	4	3
Q	(Italy) L Musetti	6	6
(Croatia) M Čilić	6	4	4
2	(Germany) A Zverev	4	6	6

Third round
8	(Canada) F Auger-Aliassime	6	6
10	(Italy) J Sinner	1	2
Q	(Italy) L Musetti	3	0^{r}
2	(Germany) A Zverev	6	1

Quarterfinals
8	(Canada) F Auger-Aliassime	3	5
2	(Germany) A Zverev	6	7

== Seeded players ==
The following are the seeded players based on the entry list per the ATP rankings as of 25 April 2022. The stated "rank" and "points before" are as of 2 May 2022.

As a result of special ranking adjustment rules due to the COVID-19 pandemic, players are defending the higher of (i) their points from the 2021 tournament or (ii) the remaining 50% of their points from the 2019 tournament. Those points were not mandatory and are included in the table below only if they counted towards the player's ranking as of 2 May 2022. Players who are not defending points from the 2021 or 2019 tournaments will instead have their 19th best result replaced by their points from the 2022 tournament.

Seed	Rank	Player	Points before	Points defending (or 19th best result)^{†}	Points won	Points after	Status
1	1	(Serbia) Novak Djokovic	8,400	500	360	8,260	Semifinals lost to (Spain) Carlos Alcaraz [7]
2	3	(Germany) Alexander Zverev	7,420	1,000	600	7,020	Runner-up, lost to (Spain) Carlos Alcaraz [7]
3	4	(Spain) Rafael Nadal	6,435	180	180	6,435	Quarterfinals lost to (Spain) Carlos Alcaraz [7]
4	5	(Greece) Stefanos Tsitsipas	5,690	300	360	5,750	Semifinals lost to (Germany) Alexander Zverev [2]
5	7	(Norway) Casper Ruud	4,110	360	10	3,760	Second round lost to (Serbia) Dušan Lajović [Q]
6	8	Andrey Rublev	4,025	90	180	4,115	Quarterfinals lost to (Greece) Stefanos Tsitsipas [4]
7	9	(Spain) Carlos Alcaraz	3,818	45	1000	4,773	Champion, defeated (Germany) Alexander Zverev [2]
8	10	(Canada) Félix Auger-Aliassime	3,625	(45)	180	3,760	Quarterfinals lost to (Germany) Alexander Zverev [2]
9	11	(United Kingdom) Cameron Norrie	3,335	(45)	90	3,380	Third round lost to (Spain) Carlos Alcaraz [7]
10	12	(Italy) Jannik Sinner	3,015	45	90	3,060	Third round lost to (Canada) Félix Auger-Aliassime [8]
~~11~~	~~13~~	~~(United States) Taylor Fritz~~	3,010	(45)	0	2,965	Withdrew due to left foot injury
12	14	(Poland) Hubert Hurkacz	3,008	58	180	3,130	Quarterfinals lost to (Serbia) Novak Djokovic [1]
13	15	(Argentina) Diego Schwartzman	2,805	(90)	45	2,760	Second round lost to (Bulgaria) Grigor Dimitrov
14	16	(Canada) Denis Shapovalov	2,671	45	45	2,671	Second round lost to (United Kingdom) Andy Murray [WC]
15	17	(United States) Reilly Opelka	2,465	35	10	2,440	First round lost to (United States) Sebastian Korda
16	18	(Spain) Pablo Carreño Busta	2,135	10	10	2,135	First round lost to (Netherlands) Botic van de Zandschulp
17	19	(Spain) Roberto Bautista Agut	1,993	45	45	1,993	Second round lost to (United Kingdom) Dan Evans

† This column shows either (a) the higher of the player's points from the 2021 tournament or 50% of his points from the 2019 tournament, or (b) his 19th best result (shown in brackets). Only ranking points counting towards the player's ranking as of May 2, 2022, are reflected in the column.

=== Withdrawn players ===
The following players would have been seeded, but withdrew before the tournament began.

Rank	Player	Points before	Points defending	Points after	Withdrawal reason
2	Daniil Medvedev	8,080	90	7,990	Hernia surgery
6	(Italy) Matteo Berrettini	4,495	600	3,895	Right hand injury

== Other entry information ==
=== Wildcards ===
- (United Kingdom) Jack Draper
- (Spain) Carlos Gimeno Valero
- (United Kingdom) Andy Murray
- (France) Lucas Pouille

=== Protected ranking ===
- (Croatia) Borna Ćorić
- (Austria) Dominic Thiem

=== Withdrawals ===
- (Italy) Matteo Berrettini → replaced by (Netherlands) Botic van de Zandschulp
- (United States) Taylor Fritz → replaced by (France) Ugo Humbert
- Daniil Medvedev → replaced by (Spain) Alejandro Davidovich Fokina
- (Switzerland) Stan Wawrinka → replaced by (Spain) Pedro Martínez

== Qualifying ==
=== Seeds ===
1. (France) Ugo Humbert (qualifying competition, lucky loser)
2. (Slovakia) Alex Molčan (first round)
3. (Argentina) Francisco Cerúndolo (first round)
4. (Hungary) Márton Fucsovics (qualifying competition)
5. (United States) Mackenzie McDonald (qualifying competition)
6. (Argentina) Federico Coria (qualifying competition)
7. (United States) Marcos Giron (first round)
8. (Belgium) David Goffin (qualified)
9. (France) Benoît Paire (qualified)
10. (Italy) Lorenzo Musetti (qualified)
11. (United States) Maxime Cressy (qualified)
12. (France) Adrian Mannarino (first round)
13. (South Korea) Kwon Soon-woo (qualified)
14. (France) Hugo Gaston (first round)

=== Qualifiers ===
1. (South Korea) Kwon Soon-woo
2. (Serbia) Dušan Lajović
3. (Italy) Lorenzo Musetti
4. (United States) Maxime Cressy
5. (Bolivia) Hugo Dellien
6. (France) Benoît Paire
7. (Belgium) David Goffin

=== Lucky loser ===
1. (France) Ugo Humbert

=== Draw ===
==== First qualifier ====
First round
1	(France) Ugo Humbert	6	6
(Spain) Pablo Andújar	4	2
WC	(China) Shang Juncheng	7	3	4
13	(South Korea) Kwon Soon-woo	5	6	6

Qualifying competition
1	(France) Ugo Humbert	6^{4}	3
13	(South Korea) Kwon Soon-woo	7^{7}	6

==== Second qualifier ====
First round
2	(Slovakia) Alex Molčan	5	4
(Spain) Roberto Carballés Baena	7	6
(Serbia) Dušan Lajović	6	6
12	(France) Adrian Mannarino	4	2

Qualifying competition
(Spain) Roberto Carballés Baena	3	2
(Serbia) Dušan Lajović	6	6

==== Third qualifier ====
First round
3	(Argentina) Francisco Cerúndolo	0	4
WC	(Spain) Alejandro Moro Cañas	6	6
(Japan) Yoshihito Nishioka	5	3
10	(Italy) Lorenzo Musetti	7	6

Qualifying competition
WC	(Spain) Alejandro Moro Cañas	7	5	2
10	(Italy) Lorenzo Musetti	5	7	6

==== Fourth qualifier ====
First round
4	(Hungary) Márton Fucsovics	6	6
WC	(Spain) Daniel Mérida	4	3
WC	(Spain) Daniel Rincón	3	4
11	(United States) Maxime Cressy	6	6

Qualifying competition
4	(Hungary) Márton Fucsovics	6^{5}	6	6^{6}
11	(United States) Maxime Cressy	7^{7}	1	7^{8}

==== Fifth qualifier ====
First round
5	(United States) Mackenzie McDonald	6	3	6
(Portugal) João Sousa	2	6	4
Alt	(Bolivia) Hugo Dellien	6	6
14	(France) Hugo Gaston	1	2

Qualifying competition
5	(United States) Mackenzie McDonald	5	1
Alt	(Bolivia) Hugo Dellien	7	6

==== Sixth qualifier ====
First round
6	(Argentina) Federico Coria	6	6
(United States) Denis Kudla	2	2
(United States) Brandon Nakashima	0	6	3
9	(France) Benoît Paire	6	3	6

Qualifying competition
6	(Argentina) Federico Coria	7^{7}	4	2
9	(France) Benoît Paire	6^{5}	6	6

==== Seventh qualifier ====
First round
7	(United States) Marcos Giron	3	5
Alt	(Chile) Alejandro Tabilo	6	7
(Czech Republic) Jiří Veselý	3	6^{3}
8	(Belgium) David Goffin	6	7^{7}

Qualifying competition
Alt	(Chile) Alejandro Tabilo	4	4
8	(Belgium) David Goffin	6	6
