= 2014 Open du Pays d'Aix – Doubles =

Doubles
- 2014 Open du Pays d'Aix

Final
- Champion: (Argentina) Diego Sebastián Schwartzman (Argentina) Horacio Zeballos
- Runner-up: (Germany) Andreas Beck (Austria) Martin Fischer
- Score: 6–4, 3–6, [10–5]

Events
| Singles | Doubles |
| Open du Pays d'Aix | · 2015 → |

This was the first edition of the event.

Diego Sebastián Schwartzman and Horacio Zeballos won the title, defeating Andreas Beck and Martin Fischer in the final, 6–4, 3–6, [10–5].

== Seeds ==
1. (United States) Nicholas Monroe / (Germany) Simon Stadler (semifinals)
2. (Germany) Dominik Meffert / (Austria) Philipp Oswald (semifinals)
3. (Germany) Philipp Marx / (Germany) Alexander Satschko (quarterfinals)
4. (Germany) Christopher Kas / (Germany) Frank Moser (withdrew)

== Draw ==
=== Key ===
- Q = Qualifier
- WC = Wild card
- LL = Lucky loser
- Alt = Alternate
- SE = Special exempt
- PR = Protected ranking
- ITF = ITF entry
- JE = Junior exempt
- w/o = Walkover
- r = Retired
- d = Defaulted
- SR = Special ranking

=== Draw ===
First round
1 | (United States) N Monroe (Germany) S Stadler | 6 | 6
WC | (France) M Chazal (France) Maxime Tchoutakian | 0 | 3
(France) G Burquier (France) D Guez | 6^{4} | 7^{7} | [10]
(Australia) J Kerr (France) F Martin | 7^{7} | 6^{5} | [7]
Alt | (Czech Republic) J Hernych (Czech Republic) J Pospíšil | 3 | 6 | [6]
(France) J Eysseric (France) M Gicquel | 6 | 3 | [10]
(Germany) A Beck (Austria) M Fischer | 7^{7} | 6
(Monaco) B Balleret (Italy) A Motti | 6^{2} | 3
(United States) J Cerretani (Sweden) A Siljeström | 3 | 6^{4}
(Argentina) DS Schwartzman (Argentina) H Zeballos | 6 | 7^{7}
(United States) D Kudla (Brazil) J Souza | 6 | 4 | 4
3 | (Germany) P Marx (Germany) A Satschko | 1 | 6 | [10]
WC | (France) F Serra (France) M Teixeira | 4 | 5
WC | (France) T Lamasine (France) Julien Obry | 6 | 7
(France) P-H Herbert (France) A Olivetti | 1 | 6^{5}
2 | (Germany) D Meffert (Austria) P Oswald | 6 | 7^{7}

Quarterfinals
1 | (United States) N Monroe (Germany) S Stadler | 4 | 6 | [10]
(France) G Burquier (France) D Guez | 6 | 3 | [7]
(France) J Eysseric (France) M Gicquel | 3 | 6^{3}
(Germany) A Beck (Austria) M Fischer | 6 | 7^{7}
(Argentina) DS Schwartzman (Argentina) H Zeballos | 6 | 6
3 | (Germany) P Marx (Germany) A Satschko | 3 | 2
WC | (France) T Lamasine (France) J Obry | 7^{7} | 4 | [7]
2 | (Germany) D Meffert (Austria) P Oswald | 6^{3} | 6 | [10]

Semifinals
1 | (United States) N Monroe (Germany) S Stadler | 3 | 5
(Germany) A Beck (Austria) M Fischer | 6 | 7
(Argentina) DS Schwartzman (Argentina) H Zeballos | 6 | 6
2 | (Germany) D Meffert (Austria) P Oswald | 1 | 4

Final
(Germany) A Beck (Austria) M Fischer | 4 | 6 | [5]
(Argentina) DS Schwartzman (Argentina) H Zeballos | 6 | 3 | [10]
