= 2019 Mutua Madrid Open – Men's doubles =

Men's doubles
- 2019 Mutua Madrid Open

Final
- Champions: (Netherlands) Jean-Julien Rojer (Romania) Horia Tecău
- Runners-up: (Argentina) Diego Schwartzman (Austria) Dominic Thiem
- Score: 6–2, 6–3

Events
Singles	men	women
Doubles	men	women
← 2018 ·	Mutua Madrid Open	· 2021 →

Nikola Mektić and Alexander Peya were the defending champions, but Peya could not participate due to injury. Mektić played alongside Franko Škugor but lost in the second round to Wesley Koolhof and Stefanos Tsitsipas.

Jean-Julien Rojer and Horia Tecău won the title after defeating Diego Schwartzman and Dominic Thiem in the final 6–2, 6–3.

== Seeds ==
1. (France) Pierre-Hugues Herbert / (France) Nicolas Mahut (withdrew)
2. (Poland) Łukasz Kubot / (Brazil) Marcelo Melo (quarterfinals)
3. (United Kingdom) Jamie Murray / (Brazil) Bruno Soares (quarterfinals)
4. (Colombia) Juan Sebastián Cabal / (Colombia) Robert Farah (first round)
5. (Croatia) Nikola Mektić / (Croatia) Franko Škugor (second round)
6. (Austria) Oliver Marach / (Croatia) Mate Pavić (quarterfinals)
7. (United States) Bob Bryan / (United States) Mike Bryan (first round)
8. (Finland) Henri Kontinen / (Australia) John Peers (second round)

== Draw ==
=== Key ===
- Q = Qualifier
- WC = Wild card
- LL = Lucky loser
- Alt = Alternate
- ITF = ITF entry
- PR = Protected ranking
- SR = Special ranking
- SE = Special exempt
- JE = Junior exempt
- JR = Junior Accelerator Programme entrant
- CO = College Accelerator Programme entrant
- NG = Next Gen Accelerator Program entrant
- w/o = Walkover
- r = Retired
- d = Defaulted

=== Finals ===
Semifinals
(Netherlands) Jean-Julien Rojer (Romania) Horia Tecău	6	5	[10]
(Netherlands) Wesley Koolhof (Greece) Stefanos Tsitsipas	4	7	[5]
(Argentina) Diego Schwartzman (Austria) Dominic Thiem	6	6
(Argentina) Guido Pella (Portugal) João Sousa	3	2

Final
(Netherlands) Jean-Julien Rojer (Romania) Horia Tecău	6	6
(Argentina) Diego Schwartzman (Austria) Dominic Thiem	2	3

=== Top half ===
First round
Alt	(United States) A Krajicek (New Zealand) A Sitak	4	4
WC	(Spain) R Carballés Baena (Spain) J Munar	6	6
(Brazil) M Demoliner (Russia) D Medvedev	6	7^{9}
(Serbia) D Lajović (Netherlands) M Middelkoop	4	6^{7}
(United Kingdom) K Edmund (United Kingdom) N Skupski	6	6
(France) J Chardy (France) G Simon	2	3
(Netherlands) J-J Rojer (Romania) H Tecău	4	7^{7}	[12]
7	(United States) B Bryan (United States) M Bryan	6	6^{2}	[10]
3	(United Kingdom) J Murray (Brazil) B Soares	6	6
(Moldova) R Albot (Georgia (country)) N Basilashvili	0	4
(Argentina) JM del Potro (Japan) K Nishikori	5	6	[10]
(Italy) F Fognini (Sweden) R Lindstedt	7	4	[4]
(Netherlands) W Koolhof (Greece) S Tsitsipas	6	6
(Italy) M Cecchinato (Hungary) M Fucsovics	3	3
(Spain) M Granollers (Spain) M López	6^{4}	0^{r}
5	(Croatia) N Mektić (Croatia) F Škugor	7^{7}	0

Second round
WC	(Spain) R Carballés Baena (Spain) J Munar	6^{5}	5
(Brazil) M Demoliner (Russia) D Medvedev	7^{7}	7
(United Kingdom) K Edmund (United Kingdom) N Skupski	2	7^{7}	[5]
(Netherlands) J-J Rojer (Romania) H Tecău	6	6^{4}	[10]
3	(United Kingdom) J Murray (Brazil) B Soares	7^{7}	6
(Argentina) JM del Potro (Japan) K Nishikori	6^{5}	2
(Netherlands) W Koolhof (Greece) S Tsitsipas	6	6
5	(Croatia) N Mektić (Croatia) F Škugor	2	4

Quarterfinals
(Brazil) M Demoliner (Russia) D Medvedev
(Netherlands) J-J Rojer (Romania) H Tecău	w/o
3	(United Kingdom) J Murray (Brazil) B Soares	2	6^{4}
(Netherlands) W Koolhof (Greece) S Tsitsipas	6	7^{7}

Semifinals
(Netherlands) J-J Rojer (Romania) H Tecău	6	5	[10]
(Netherlands) W Koolhof (Greece) S Tsitsipas	4	7	[5]

=== Bottom half ===
First round
6	(Austria) O Marach (Croatia) M Pavić	6	3	[10]
(Croatia) I Dodig (France) É Roger-Vasselin	4	6	[5]
(Argentina) M González (Argentina) H Zeballos	7	2	[11]
(United States) R Ram (United Kingdom) J Salisbury	5	6	[9]
WC	(Spain) D Marrero (Spain) F Verdasco	6	3	[3]
(Argentina) D Schwartzman (Austria) D Thiem	4	6	[10]
(Bulgaria) G Dimitrov (Russia) K Khachanov	6	7
4	(Colombia) JS Cabal (Colombia) R Farah	2	5
8	(Finland) H Kontinen (Australia) J Peers	6	6
WC	(Australia) N Kyrgios (Australia) B Tomic	2	4
(Argentina) G Pella (Portugal) J Sousa	7^{7}	6
(India) R Bopanna (United Kingdom) D Inglot	6^{4}	3
(Netherlands) R Haase (South Africa) R Klaasen	7^{8}	7^{7}
(Germany) A Zverev (Germany) M Zverev	6^{6}	6^{5}
(Japan) B McLachlan (Germany) J-L Struff	5	7	[6]
2	(Poland) Ł Kubot (Brazil) M Melo	7	5	[10]

Second round
6	(Austria) O Marach (Croatia) M Pavić	6	7^{7}
(Argentina) M González (Argentina) H Zeballos	4	6^{3}
(Argentina) D Schwartzman (Austria) D Thiem	w/o
(Bulgaria) G Dimitrov (Russia) K Khachanov
8	(Finland) H Kontinen (Australia) J Peers	6	6^{11}	[9]
(Argentina) G Pella (Portugal) J Sousa	4	7^{13}	[11]
(Netherlands) R Haase (South Africa) R Klaasen	4	6^{5}
2	(Poland) Ł Kubot (Brazil) M Melo	6	7^{7}

Quarterfinals
6	(Austria) O Marach (Croatia) M Pavić	6	3	[7]
(Argentina) D Schwartzman (Austria) D Thiem	2	6	[10]
(Argentina) G Pella (Portugal) J Sousa	6	6
2	(Poland) Ł Kubot (Brazil) M Melo	2	2

Semifinals
(Argentina) D Schwartzman (Austria) D Thiem	6	6
(Argentina) G Pella (Portugal) J Sousa	3	2
