= 2019 Argentina Open – Doubles =

Doubles
- 2019 Argentina Open

Final
- Champions: (Argentina) Máximo González (Argentina) Horacio Zeballos
- Runners-up: (Argentina) Diego Schwartzman (Austria) Dominic Thiem
- Score: 6–1, 6–1

Events
Singles	Doubles
- Argentina Open

The 2019 Argentina Open was a professional men's tennis tournament played on outdoor clay courts at the Buenos Aires Lawn Tennis Club. In the doubles event, Máximo González and Horacio Zeballos captured the title by defeating Diego Schwartzman and Dominic Thiem in a decisive final, 6–1, 6–1. The victory marked a significant achievement for the top-seeded Argentinian duo on home soil.

Andrés Molteni and Zeballos entered the tournament as the defending champions; however, their bid for a consecutive title ended in the quarterfinals with a loss to Marco Cecchinato and Dušan Lajović. The draw featured several prominent international pairings, with the seeded teams largely dominating the early rounds before the final showcased a high-profile matchup between specialists and top-tier singles players competing in the doubles bracket.

== Seeds ==
1. (Argentina) Máximo González / (Argentina) Horacio Zeballos (champions)
2. (Uruguay) Pablo Cuevas / (Spain) Marc López (first round)
3. (Brazil) Marcelo Demoliner / (Denmark) Frederik Nielsen (quarterfinals)
4. (Czech Republic) Roman Jebavý / (Argentina) Andrés Molteni (quarterfinals)

== Draw ==
Key

- Q = Qualifier
- WC = Wild card
- LL = Lucky loser
- Alt = Alternate
- ITF = ITF entry
- PR = Protected ranking
- SR = Special ranking
- SE = Special exempt
- JE = Junior exempt
- JR = Junior Accelerator Programme entrant
- CO = College Accelerator Programme entrant
- NG = Next Gen Accelerator Program entrant
- w/o = Walkover
- r = Retired
- d = Defaulted

=== Draw ===
First round
1	(Argentina) M González (Argentina) H Zeballos	7^{10}	6
(United States) N Monroe (Mexico) MÁ Reyes-Varela	6^{8}	4
(Argentina) G Andreozzi (Argentina) G Pella	6	6
(Spain) G Granollers (Portugal) J Sousa	4	3
4	(Czech Republic) R Jebavý (Argentina) A Molteni	6	6
(Japan) T Daniel (Germany) M Marterer	4	2
(Italy) M Cecchinato (Serbia) D Lajović	4	6	[10]
WC	(Argentina) F Delbonis (Argentina) G Durán	6	3	[8]
(Spain) J Munar (Spain) A Ramos Viñolas	7^{7}	3	[11]
(Slovenia) A Bedene (Spain) D Marrero	6^{2}	6	[9]
(El Salvador) M Arévalo (United States) J Cerretani	3	6	[5]
3	(Brazil) M Demoliner (Denmark) F Nielsen	6	3	[10]
(Spain) R Carballés Baena (Tunisia) M Jaziri	6	7^{7}
WC	(Belgium) S Gillé (Belgium) J Vliegen	3	6^{4}
(Argentina) D Schwartzman (Austria) D Thiem	6	7
2	(Uruguay) P Cuevas (Spain) M López	3	5

Quarterfinals
1	(Argentina) M González (Argentina) H Zeballos	6	7^{7}
(Argentina) G Andreozzi (Argentina) G Pella	4	6^{3}
4	(Czech Republic) R Jebavý (Argentina) A Molteni	3	7	[3]
(Italy) M Cecchinato (Serbia) D Lajović	6	5	[10]
(Spain) J Munar (Spain) A Ramos Viñolas	2	6	[10]
3	(Brazil) M Demoliner (Denmark) F Nielsen	6	3	[5]
(Spain) R Carballés Baena (Tunisia) M Jaziri	4	1
(Argentina) D Schwartzman (Austria) D Thiem	6	6

Semifinals
1	(Argentina) M González (Argentina) H Zeballos	6	6
(Italy) M Cecchinato (Serbia) D Lajović	1	3
(Spain) J Munar (Spain) A Ramos Viñolas	4	6	[6]
(Argentina) D Schwartzman (Austria) D Thiem	6	3	[10]

Final
1	(Argentina) M González (Argentina) H Zeballos	6	6
(Argentina) D Schwartzman (Austria) D Thiem	1	1
