= 2014 Open du Pays d'Aix – Singles =

Singles
- 2014 Open du Pays d'Aix

Final
- Champion: (Argentina) Diego Sebastián Schwartzman
- Runner-up: (Germany) Andreas Beck
- Score: 6–7^{(4–7)}, 6–3, 6–2

Events
Singles	Doubles
Open du Pays d'Aix	· 2015 →

This was the first edition of the event.

Diego Sebastián Schwartzman won the title, defeating Andreas Beck in the final, 6–7^{(4–7)}, 6–3, 6–2.

== Seeds ==
1. (United States) Denis Kudla (first round)
2. (Slovenia) ~~Blaž Rola~~ (withdrew)
3. (Argentina) Diego Sebastián Schwartzman (champion)
4. (Argentina) Horacio Zeballos (first round)
5. (France) Pierre-Hugues Herbert (first round)
6. (Brazil) João Souza (first round)
7. (Germany) Andreas Beck (final)
8. (France) Marc Gicquel (first round)
9. (Belgium) Ruben Bemelmans (second round)

== Draw ==
=== Key ===
- Q = Qualifier
- WC = Wild card
- LL = Lucky loser
- Alt = Alternate
- SE = Special exempt
- PR = Protected ranking
- ITF = ITF entry
- JE = Junior exempt
- w/o = Walkover
- r = Retired
- d = Defaulted
- SR = Special ranking

=== Finals ===
Semifinals
(Spain) Rubén Ramírez Hidalgo	4	1
7	(Germany) Andreas Beck	6	6
3	(Argentina) Diego Schwartzman	6	6
Q	(Switzerland) Yann Marti	3	1

Final
7	(Germany) Andreas Beck	7^{7}	3	2
3	(Argentina) Diego Schwartzman	6^{4}	6	6

=== Top half ===
First round
1	(United States) D Kudla	2	4
(Spain) R Ramírez Hidalgo	6	6
(Austria) M Fischer	2	7	4
WC	(France) A Michon	6	5	6
(Portugal) G Elias	6	0	6^{4}
(Belgium) N Desein	3	6	7^{7}
LL	(Spain) J Samper Montaña	4	6	6
6	(Brazil) J Souza	6	4	0
4	(Argentina) H Zeballos	4	7	6^{7}
(Czech Republic) J Mertl	6	5	7^{9}
WC	(France) F Serra	6	1	3
Q	(France) J Eysseric	2	6	6
(France) M Teixeira	6	6
Q	(France) L Lokoli	3	3
WC	(France) M Vaïsse	5	4
7	(Germany) A Beck	7	6

Second round
(Spain) R Ramírez Hidalgo	6	6
WC	(France) A Michon	3	2
(Belgium) N Desein	6	2	3
LL	(Spain) J Samper Montaña	2	6	6
(Czech Republic) J Mertl	6	4	3
Q	(France) J Eysseric	4	6	6
(France) M Teixeira	5	0
7	(Germany) A Beck	7	6

Quarterfinals
(Spain) R Ramírez Hidalgo	7^{7}	6
LL	(Spain) J Samper Montaña	6^{2}	1
Q	(France) J Eysseric	3	4
7	(Germany) A Beck	6	6

Semifinals
(Spain) R Ramírez Hidalgo	4	1
7	(Germany) A Beck	6	6

=== Bottom half ===
First round
5	(France) P-H Herbert	2	6	6^{5}
(Czech Republic) J Hernych	6	1	7^{7}
(Czech Republic) J Pospíšil	7^{7}	6
(Spain) E López Pérez	6^{4}	2
(France) V Millot	6^{5}	2
(France) D Guez	7^{7}	6
(Italy) M Viola	6	0	4
3	(Argentina) D Schwartzman	3	6	6
8	(France) M Gicquel	4	5
Q	(Switzerland) Y Marti	6	7
(Germany) M Bachinger	6	5	7
WC	(France) Julien Obry	3	7	5
Q	(Switzerland) H Laaksonen	6	4	0^{r}
(France) A Olivetti	4	6	1
(France) G Burquier	7^{7}	1	3
9	(Belgium) R Bemelmans	6^{3}	6	6

Second round
(Czech Republic) J Hernych	6	5	6
(Czech Republic) J Pospíšil	4	7	2
(France) D Guez	6^{2}	6^{4}
3	(Argentina) D Schwartzman	7^{7}	7^{7}
Q	(Switzerland) Y Marti	6	6
(Germany) M Bachinger	4	4
(France) A Olivetti	7^{7}	6
9	(Belgium) R Bemelmans	6^{3}	2

Quarterfinals
(Czech Republic) J Hernych	6^{6}	7^{8}	4
3	(Argentina) D Schwartzman	7^{8}	6^{6}	6
Q	(Switzerland) Y Marti	6	7^{7}
(France) A Olivetti	2	6^{2}

Semifinals
3	(Argentina) D Schwartzman	6	6
Q	(Switzerland) Y Marti	3	1
