= 2019 Argentina Open =

- Date: 11–17 February
- Edition: 22nd
- Category: ATP Tour 250 series
- Draw: 28S / 16D
- Prize money: $590,745
- Surface: Clay / outdoor
- Location: Buenos Aires, Argentina
- Venue: Buenos Aires Lawn Tennis Club

Champions

Singles
- (Italy) Marco Cecchinato

Doubles
- (Argentina) Máximo González / (Argentina) Horacio Zeballos
← 2018 ·	ATP Buenos Aires	· 2020 →

The 2019 Argentina Open was a men's tennis tournament played on outdoor clay courts. It was the 22nd edition of the ATP Buenos Aires event, and part of the ATP Tour 250 series of the 2019 ATP Tour. It took place in Buenos Aires, Argentina, from February 11 through 17, 2019.

== Singles main draw entrants ==
=== Seeds ===
Country	Player	Rank^{1}	Seed
AUT	Dominic Thiem	8	1
ITA	Fabio Fognini	15	2
ITA	Marco Cecchinato	19	3
ARG	Diego Schwartzman	20	4
POR	João Sousa	39	5
CHI	Nicolás Jarry	41	6
SRB	Dušan Lajović	42	7
TUN	Malek Jaziri	43	8

- ^{1} Rankings are as of February 4, 2019.

=== Other entrants ===
The following players received wildcards into the singles main draw:

- (Canada) Félix Auger-Aliassime
- (Argentina) Francisco Cerúndolo
- (Spain) David Ferrer

The following player received entry as a special exempt:

- (Argentina) Juan Ignacio Londero

The following players received entry from the qualifying draw:

- (El Salvador) Marcelo Arévalo
- (Argentina) Facundo Bagnis
- (Brazil) Rogério Dutra Silva
- (Italy) Lorenzo Sonego

=== Withdrawals ===
Before the tournament

- (Spain) Pablo Carreño Busta → replaced by (Chile) Christian Garín

== Doubles main draw entrants ==
=== Seeds ===
Country	Player	Country	Player	Rank^{1}	Seed
ARG	Máximo González	ARG	Horacio Zeballos	64	1
URU	Pablo Cuevas	ESP	Marc López	80	2
BRA	Marcelo Demoliner	DEN	Frederik Nielsen	109	3
CZE	Roman Jebavý	ARG	Andrés Molteni	109	4

- ^{1} Rankings are as of February 4, 2019.

=== Other entrants ===
The following pairs received wildcards into the doubles main draw:

- (Argentina) Federico Delbonis / (Argentina) Guillermo Durán
- (Belgium) Sander Gillé / (Belgium) Joran Vliegen

== Finals ==
=== Singles ===
- (Italy) Marco Cecchinato defeated (Argentina) Diego Schwartzman, 6–1, 6–2

=== Doubles ===
- (Argentina) Máximo González / (Argentina) Horacio Zeballos defeated (Argentina) Diego Schwartzman / (Austria) Dominic Thiem, 6–1, 6–1
