= 2019 Argentina Open – Singles =

Singles
- 2019 Argentina Open

Final
- Champion: (Italy) Marco Cecchinato
- Runner-up: (Argentina) Diego Schwartzman
- Score: 6–1, 6–2

Details
- Draw: 28 (4 Q / 3 WC )
- Seeds: 8

Events
Singles	Doubles
- Argentina Open

Dominic Thiem was the defending champion, but lost to Diego Schwartzman in the semifinals.

Marco Cecchinato won the title, defeating Schwartzman in the final, 6–1, 6–2.

== Seeds ==
The top four seeds received a bye into the second round.

1. (Austria) Dominic Thiem (semifinals)
2. (Italy) Fabio Fognini (second round)
3. (Italy) Marco Cecchinato (champion)
4. (Argentina) Diego Schwartzman (final)
5. (Portugal) João Sousa (second round)
6. (Chile) Nicolás Jarry (first round)
7. (Serbia) Dušan Lajović (first round)
8. (Tunisia) Malek Jaziri (first round)

== Draw ==
Key

- Q = Qualifier
- WC = Wild card
- LL = Lucky loser
- Alt = Alternate
- ITF = ITF entry
- PR = Protected ranking
- SR = Special ranking
- SE = Special exempt
- JE = Junior exempt
- JR = Junior Accelerator Programme entrant
- CO = College Accelerator Programme entrant
- NG = Next Gen Accelerator Program entrant
- w/o = Walkover
- r = Retired
- d = Defaulted

=== Finals ===
Semifinals
1	(Austria) Dominic Thiem	6	4	6^{5}
4	(Argentina) Diego Schwartzman	2	6	7^{7}
3	(Italy) Marco Cecchinato	6	6
(Argentina) Guido Pella	4	2

Final
4	(Argentina) Diego Schwartzman	1	2
3	(Italy) Marco Cecchinato	6	6

=== Top half ===
First round
Q	(Argentina) F Bagnis	4	2
(Germany) M Marterer	6	6
Q	(El Salvador) M Arévalo	2	1
(Uruguay) P Cuevas	6	6
SE	(Argentina) JI Londero	3	4
5	(Portugal) J Sousa	6	6
(Argentina) G Andreozzi	6	6^{5}	2
(Slovenia) A Bedene	1	7^{7}	6
(Spain) A Ramos Viñolas	6	6
Q	(Brazil) R Dutra Silva	3	4
WC	(Spain) D Ferrer	7^{15}	6
8	(Tunisia) M Jaziri	6^{13}	3

Second round
1	(Austria) D Thiem	6	6
(Germany) M Marterer	4	4
(Uruguay) P Cuevas	6	7
5	(Portugal) J Sousa	4	5
4	(Argentina) D Schwartzman	6	2	6
(Slovenia) A Bedene	4	6	2
(Spain) A Ramos Viñolas	3	7^{11}	6
WC	(Spain) D Ferrer	6	6^{9}	3

Quarterfinals
1	(Austria) D Thiem	4	6	6
(Uruguay) P Cuevas	6	4	3
4	(Argentina) D Schwartzman	6	7
(Spain) A Ramos Viñolas	1	5

Semifinals
1	(Austria) D Thiem	6	4	6^{5}
4	(Argentina) D Schwartzman	2	6	7^{7}

=== Bottom half ===
First round
6	(Chile) N Jarry	7^{7}	4	3
Q	(Italy) L Sonego	6^{3}	6	6
(Spain) R Carballés Baena	6	6
(Japan) T Daniel	1	0
(Chile) C Garín	3	7	6
WC	(Canada) F Auger-Aliassime	6	5	3
7	(Serbia) D Lajović	3	6^{3}
(Argentina) L Mayer	6	7^{7}
WC	(Argentina) F Cerúndolo	6	4	1
(Argentina) G Pella	3	6	6
(Spain) J Munar	6	2	6
(Argentina) F Delbonis	2	6	1

Second round
Q	(Italy) L Sonego	5	1
(Spain) R Carballés Baena	7	6
(Chile) C Garín	6^{4}	4
3	(Italy) M Cecchinato	7^{7}	6
(Argentina) L Mayer	4	6	6^{5}
(Argentina) G Pella	6	1	7^{7}
(Spain) J Munar	4	6	7
2	(Italy) F Fognini	6	4	5

Quarterfinals
(Spain) R Carballés Baena	6^{3}	4
3	(Italy) M Cecchinato	7^{7}	6
(Argentina) G Pella	6^{3}	7^{11}	6
(Spain) J Munar	7^{7}	6^{9}	1

Semifinals
3	(Italy) M Cecchinato	6	6
(Argentina) G Pella	4	2

== Qualifying ==
=== Seeds ===
1. (United Kingdom) Cameron Norrie (qualifying competition)
2. (Brazil) Thiago Monteiro (first round)
3. (Italy) Lorenzo Sonego (qualified)
4. (Sweden) Elias Ymer (qualifying competition)
5. (Bolivia) Hugo Dellien (qualifying competition)
6. (Argentina) Marco Trungelliti (first round)
7. (Norway) Casper Ruud (first round)
8. (Argentina) Carlos Berlocq (first round)

=== Qualifiers ===
1. (Brazil) Rogério Dutra Silva
2. (Argentina) Facundo Bagnis
3. (Italy) Lorenzo Sonego
4. (El Salvador) Marcelo Arévalo

=== Qualifying draw ===
==== First qualifier ====
First round
1	(United Kingdom) Cameron Norrie	6	4	7
(Slovakia) Andrej Martin	4	6	5
(Brazil) Rogério Dutra Silva	6	3	6
7	(Norway) Casper Ruud	2	6	4

Qualifying competition
1	(United Kingdom) Cameron Norrie	7^{8}	6^{3}	2
(Brazil) Rogério Dutra Silva	6^{6}	7^{7}	6

==== Second qualifier ====
First round
2	(Brazil) Thiago Monteiro	7^{10}	4	4
(Argentina) Facundo Bagnis	6^{8}	6	6
WC	(Argentina) Juan Bautista Otegui	2	2
5	(Bolivia) Hugo Dellien	6	6

Qualifying competition
(Argentina) Facundo Bagnis	7^{7}	6
5	(Bolivia) Hugo Dellien	6^{5}	2

==== Third qualifier ====
First round
3	(Italy) Lorenzo Sonego	6	7
(Italy) Federico Gaio	4	5
(Italy) Alessandro Giannessi	6	6
6	(Argentina) Marco Trungelliti	4	1

Qualifying competition
3	(Italy) Lorenzo Sonego	6	3
(Italy) Alessandro Giannessi	4	3^{r}

==== Fourth qualifier ====
First round
4	(Sweden) Elias Ymer	3	6	7
WC	(Argentina) Juan Pablo Ficovich	6	4	5
(El Salvador) Marcelo Arévalo	6	6
8	(Argentina) Carlos Berlocq	4	3

Qualifying competition
4	(Sweden) Elias Ymer	4	6	4
(El Salvador) Marcelo Arévalo	6	1	6
