= 2014 Copa San Juan Gobierno =

- Date: 13 – 19 October
- Edition: 3rd
- Surface: Clay
- Location: San Juan, Argentina

Champions

Singles
- (Argentina) Diego Schwartzman

Doubles
- (Argentina) Martín Alund / (Argentina) Facundo Bagnis
← 2013 ·	Copa San Juan Gobierno	· 2015 →

The 2014 Copa San Juan Gobierno was a professional tennis tournament played on clay courts. It was the third edition of the tournament which was part of the 2014 ATP Challenger Tour. It took place in San Juan, Argentina between 13 and 19 October 2014.

== Singles main-draw entrants ==
=== Seeds ===
Country	Player	Rank^{1}	Seed
ARG	Diego Sebastián Schwartzman	79	1
BRA	João Souza	89	2
COL	Alejandro González	90	3
ARG	Horacio Zeballos	104	4
ARG	Facundo Bagnis	120	5
ARG	Facundo Argüello	144	6
NED	Thiemo de Bakker	147	7
ARG	Guido Andreozzi	150	8

- ^{1} Rankings are as of October 6, 2014.

=== Other entrants ===
The following players received wildcards into the singles main draw:

- (Argentina) Marco Trungelliti
- (Argentina) Nicolás Kicker
- (Argentina) Facundo Alvo
- (Argentina) Pedro Cachin

The following players received entry from the qualifying draw:

- (Dominican Republic) José Hernández
- (Bolivia) Hugo Dellien
- (Italy) Dante Gennaro
- (France) Gianni Mina

== Champions ==
=== Singles ===
- (Argentina) Diego Schwartzman def. (Brazil) João Souza, 7–6^{(7–5)}, 6–3

=== Doubles ===
- (Argentina) Martín Alund / (Argentina) Facundo Bagnis def. (Argentina) Diego Schwartzman / (Argentina) Horacio Zeballos, 4–6, 6–3, [10–7]
