= 2012 Copa San Juan Gobierno =

- Date: 8–14 October
- Edition: 1st
- Surface: Clay
- Location: San Juan, Argentina

Champions

Singles
- (Netherlands) Thiemo de Bakker

Doubles
- (Argentina) Martín Alund / (Argentina) Horacio Zeballos
- Copa San Juan Gobierno

The 2012 Copa San Juan Gobierno was a professional tennis tournament played on clay courts. It was the first edition of the tournament which was part of the 2012 ATP Challenger Tour. It took place in San Juan, Argentina between 8 and 14 October 2012.

== Singles main draw entrants ==
=== Seeds ===
Country	Player	Rank^{1}	Seed
ARG	Leonardo Mayer	82	1
POR	João Sousa	101	2
ARG	Guido Pella	121	3
ARG	Horacio Zeballos	124	4
FRA	Guillaume Rufin	129	5
BRA	Rogério Dutra da Silva	131	6
POR	Frederico Gil	132	7
ARG	Martín Alund	135	8

- ^{1} Rankings are as of October 1, 2012.

=== Other entrants ===
The following players received wildcards into the singles main draw:

- (Argentina) Facundo Alvo
- (Argentina) Diego Junqueira
- (Argentina) Renzo Olivo
- (Argentina) Diego Sebastián Schwartzman

The following players received entry as a special exempt into the singles main draw:

- (Brazil) Ricardo Hocevar
- (Chile) Nicolas Massú

The following players received entry from the qualifying draw:

- (United States) Andrea Collarini
- (Argentina) Leandro Migani
- (France) Stéphane Robert
- (Netherlands) Thomas Schoorel

== Champions ==
=== Singles ===
- (Netherlands) Thiemo de Bakker def. (Argentina) Martín Alund, 6–2, 3–6, 6–2

=== Doubles ===
- (Argentina) Martín Alund / (Argentina) Horacio Zeballos def. (United States) Nicholas Monroe / (Germany) Simon Stadler, 3–6, 6–2, [14–12]
