= 2021 Mutua Madrid Open – Men's singles =

Men's singles
- 2021 Mutua Madrid Open

Final
- Champion: (Germany) Alexander Zverev
- Runner-up: (Italy) Matteo Berrettini
- Score: 6–7^{(8–10)}, 6–4, 6–3

Details
- Draw: 56 (8 Q / 4 WC )
- Seeds: 16

Events
Singles	men	women
Doubles	men	women
← 2019 ·	Mutua Madrid Open	· 2022 →

Alexander Zverev defeated Matteo Berrettini in the final, 6–7^{(8–10)}, 6–4, 6–3 to win the men's singles tennis title at the 2021 Madrid Open. It was his fourth Masters 1000 title, his first since the 2018 Madrid Open, and his 15th career ATP Tour singles title overall.

Novak Djokovic was the reigning champion from when the tournament was last held in 2019, but did not participate.

Following the third-round eliminations of Daniil Medvedev and Stefanos Tsitsipas, respectively, a first-time Masters 1000 singles finalist from the bottom half of the draw was guaranteed; Berrettini went on to become that player.

== Seeds ==
The top eight seeds received a bye into the second round.

1. (Spain) Rafael Nadal (quarterfinals)
2. (Russia) Daniil Medvedev (third round)
3. (Austria) Dominic Thiem (semifinals)
4. (Greece) Stefanos Tsitsipas (third round)
5. (Germany) Alexander Zverev (champion)
6. (Russia) Andrey Rublev (third round)
7. (Argentina) Diego Schwartzman (second round)
8. (Italy) Matteo Berrettini (final)

9. (Spain) Roberto Bautista Agut (second round)
10. (Spain) Pablo Carreño Busta (first round)
11. (Canada) Denis Shapovalov (second round)
12. (Poland) Hubert Hurkacz (first round)
13. (Bulgaria) Grigor Dimitrov (first round)
14. (Italy) Jannik Sinner (second round)
15. (Canada) Félix Auger-Aliassime (first round)
16. (Chile) Cristian Garín (quarterfinals)

Click on the seed number of a player to go to their draw section.

== Draw ==
=== Key ===
- Q = Qualifier
- WC = Wild card
- LL = Lucky loser
- Alt = Alternate
- ITF = ITF entry
- PR = Protected ranking
- SR = Special ranking
- SE = Special exempt
- JE = Junior exempt
- JR = Junior Accelerator Programme entrant
- CO = College Accelerator Programme entrant
- NG = Next Gen Accelerator Program entrant
- w/o = Walkover
- r = Retired
- d = Defaulted

=== Finals ===
Quarterfinals
1	(Spain) Rafael Nadal	4	4
5	(Germany) Alexander Zverev	6	6
3	(Austria) Dominic Thiem	3	6	6
(United States) John Isner	6	3	4
(Kazakhstan) Alexander Bublik	5	1
(Norway) Casper Ruud	7	6
8	(Italy) Matteo Berrettini	5	6	6
16	(Chile) Cristian Garín	7	3	0

Semifinals
5	(Germany) Alexander Zverev	6	6
3	(Austria) Dominic Thiem	3	4
(Norway) Casper Ruud	4	4
8	(Italy) Matteo Berrettini	6	6

Final
5	(Germany) Alexander Zverev	6^{8}	6	6
8	(Italy) Matteo Berrettini	7^{10}	4	3

=== Top half ===
==== Section 1 ====
First round
(France) A Mannarino	4	0
WC	(Spain) C Alcaraz	6	6
Q	(Australia) A Popyrin	6	7^{7}
(Germany) J-L Struff	3	6^{4}
(Argentina) G Pella	2	4^{r}
14	(Italy) J Sinner	6	4
12	(Poland) H Hurkacz	7	6^{7}	3
(Australia) J Millman	5	7^{9}	6
(France) J Chardy	6^{6}	7^{9}	2
(United Kingdom) D Evans	7^{8}	6^{7}	6
(Russia) K Khachanov	7^{8}	2	2
(Japan) K Nishikori	6^{6}	6	6

Second round
1	(Spain) R Nadal	6	6
WC	(Spain) C Alcaraz	1	2
Q	(Australia) A Popyrin	7^{7}	6
14	(Italy) J Sinner	6^{5}	2
(Australia) J Millman	7^{7}	2	3
(United Kingdom) D Evans	6^{5}	6	6
(Japan) K Nishikori	3	2
5	(Germany) A Zverev	6	6

Third round
1	(Spain) R Nadal	6	6
Q	(Australia) A Popyrin	3	3
(United Kingdom) D Evans	3	6^{3}
5	(Germany) A Zverev	6	7^{7}

Quarterfinals
1	(Spain) R Nadal	4	4
5	(Germany) A Zverev	6	6

==== Section 2 ====
First round
Q	(Spain) P Andújar	7^{10}	6^{4}	5
Q	(United States) M Giron	6^{8}	7^{7}	7
(Australia) A de Minaur	4	7	6
WC	(Spain) J Munar	6	5	1
(South Africa) L Harris	6	3	7^{7}
13	(Bulgaria) G Dimitrov	3	6	6^{5}
9	(Spain) R Bautista Agut	6	6^{3}	7
Q	(Italy) M Cecchinato	2	7^{7}	5
(United States) J Isner	6	7^{8}
(Serbia) M Kecmanović	4	6^{6}
WC	(Spain) P Martínez	4	5
(United States) T Paul	6	7

Second round
3	(Austria) D Thiem	6	6
Q	(United States) M Giron	1	3
(Australia) A de Minaur	6	3
(South Africa) L Harris	2	0^{r}
9	(Spain) R Bautista Agut	4	7^{7}	6^{6}
(United States) J Isner	6	6^{4}	7^{8}
(United States) T Paul	7^{7}	3	4
6	(Russia) A Rublev	6^{5}	6	6

Third round
3	(Austria) D Thiem	7^{9}	6
(Australia) A de Minaur	6^{7}	4
(United States) J Isner	7^{7}	3	7^{7}
6	(Russia) A Rublev	6^{4}	6	6^{4}

Quarterfinals
3	(Austria) D Thiem	3	6	6
(United States) J Isner	6	3	4

=== Bottom half ===
==== Section 3 ====
First round
(France) U Humbert	5	4
(Russia) A Karatsev	7	6
(Hungary) M Fucsovics	6^{5}	3
(Kazakhstan) A Bublik	7^{7}	6
(Serbia) D Lajović	1	3
11	(Canada) D Shapovalov	6	6
15	(Canada) F Auger-Aliassime	1	4
(Norway) C Ruud	6	6
LL	(Japan) Y Nishioka	6	6
(Serbia) F Krajinović	2	4
(Georgia (country)) N Basilashvili	4	5
(France) B Paire	6	7

Second round
7	(Argentina) D Schwartzman	6	4	1
(Russia) A Karatsev	2	6	6
(Kazakhstan) A Bublik	6	5	6
11	(Canada) D Shapovalov	4	7	4
(Norway) C Ruud	6	6
LL	(Japan) Y Nishioka	1	2
(France) B Paire	1	2
4	(Greece) S Tsitsipas	6	6

Third round
(Russia) A Karatsev	4	3
(Kazakhstan) A Bublik	6	6
(Norway) C Ruud	7^{7}	6
4	(Greece) S Tsitsipas	6^{4}	4

Quarterfinals
(Kazakhstan) A Bublik	5	1
(Norway) C Ruud	7	6

==== Section 4 ====
First round
Q	(Spain) C Taberner	6^{4}	6	3
(Italy) F Fognini	7^{7}	2	6
(United States) T Fritz	5	7	4
(Spain) A Ramos Viñolas	7	5	6
Q	(Argentina) F Delbonis	3	6	6
10	(Spain) P Carreño Busta	6	4	3
16	(Chile) C Garín	6	6
WC	(Spain) F Verdasco	1	4
(Germany) D Koepfer	6	6
(United States) R Opelka	4	4
Q	(France) P-H Herbert	7^{7}	6^{4}	6^{4}
(Spain) A Davidovich Fokina	6^{5}	7^{7}	7^{7}

Second round
8	(Italy) M Berrettini	6	6
(Italy) F Fognini	3	4
(Spain) A Ramos Viñolas	6^{5}	3
Q	(Argentina) F Delbonis	7^{7}	6
16	(Chile) C Garín	6	6
(Germany) D Koepfer	3	4
(Spain) A Davidovich Fokina	6	4	2
2	(Russia) D Medvedev	4	6	6

Third round
8	(Italy) M Berrettini	7^{7}	6
Q	(Argentina) F Delbonis	6^{4}	4
16	(Chile) C Garín	6	6^{2}	6
2	(Russia) D Medvedev	4	7^{7}	1

Quarterfinals
8	(Italy) M Berrettini	5	6	6
16	(Chile) C Garín	7	3	0

== Qualifying ==
=== Seeds ===
1. (Serbia) Laslo Đere (first round)
2. (Japan) Yoshihito Nishioka (qualifying competition, retired, lucky loser)
3. (Australia) Jordan Thompson (first round)
4. (United States) Tennys Sandgren (first round)
5. (United States) Frances Tiafoe (first round)
6. (United States) Sebastian Korda (first round)
7. (Italy) Stefano Travaglia (qualifying competition)
8. (Finland) Emil Ruusuvuori (first round)
9. (Belarus) Egor Gerasimov (first round)
10. (Australia) Alexei Popyrin (qualified)
11. (Brazil) Thiago Monteiro (first round)
12. (Argentina) Federico Delbonis (qualified)
13. (Spain) Pablo Andújar (qualified)
14. (Moldova) Radu Albot (first round)

=== Qualifiers ===
1. (Argentina) Federico Delbonis
2. (United States) Marcos Giron
3. (Spain) Carlos Taberner
4. (France) Pierre-Hugues Herbert
5. (Italy) Marco Cecchinato
6. (Australia) Alexei Popyrin
7. (Spain) Pablo Andújar

=== Lucky loser ===
1. (Japan) Yoshihito Nishioka

=== Qualifying draw ===
==== First qualifier ====
First round
1	(Serbia) Laslo Đere	3	6	2
(Argentina) Juan Ignacio Londero	6	3	6
WC	(Spain) Bernabé Zapata Miralles	6^{5}	6^{5}
12	(Argentina) Federico Delbonis	7^{7}	7^{7}

Qualifying competition
(Argentina) Juan Ignacio Londero	4	4
12	(Argentina) Federico Delbonis	6	6

==== Second qualifier ====
First round
2	(Japan) Yoshihito Nishioka	6	6
(Uruguay) Pablo Cuevas	4	4
(United States) Marcos Giron	6	6^{12}	7^{7}
11	(Brazil) Thiago Monteiro	4	7^{14}	6^{4}

Qualifying competition
2	(Japan) Yoshihito Nishioka	7^{7}	4	0^{r}
(United States) Marcos Giron	6^{4}	6	0

==== Third qualifier ====
First round
3	(Australia) Jordan Thompson	6	6^{6}	2
WC	(Spain) Carlos Taberner	3	7^{8}	6
(Italy) Lorenzo Musetti	6	6
14	(Moldova) Radu Albot	3	4

Qualifying competition
WC	(Spain) Carlos Taberner	6	6
(Italy) Lorenzo Musetti	4	2

==== Fourth qualifier ====
First round
4	(United States) Tennys Sandgren	3	2
(France) Pierre-Hugues Herbert	6	6
(Italy) Gianluca Mager	6	6
9	(Belarus) Egor Gerasimov	4	3

Qualifying competition
(France) Pierre-Hugues Herbert	7^{7}	6
(Italy) Gianluca Mager	6^{4}	4

==== Fifth qualifier ====
First round
5	(United States) Frances Tiafoe	6^{4}	2
(Italy) Marco Cecchinato	7^{7}	6
(Spain) Roberto Carballés Baena	6	6
8	(Finland) Emil Ruusuvuori	2	3

Qualifying competition
(Italy) Marco Cecchinato	4	6	6
(Spain) Roberto Carballés Baena	6	0	3

==== Sixth qualifier ====
First round
6	(United States) Sebastian Korda	6^{3}	4
WC	(France) Arthur Cazaux	7^{7}	6
(Argentina) Federico Coria	7^{7}	4	3
10	(Australia) Alexei Popyrin	6^{4}	6	6

Qualifying competition
WC	(France) Arthur Cazaux	5	6^{0}
10	(Australia) Alexei Popyrin	7	7^{7}

==== Seventh qualifier ====
First round
7	(Italy) Stefano Travaglia	5	6	7
WC	(Spain) Carlos Gimeno Valero	7	1	5
(Kazakhstan) Mikhail Kukushkin	3	4
13	(Spain) Pablo Andújar	6	6

Qualifying competition
7	(Italy) Stefano Travaglia	7^{7}	5	3
13	(Spain) Pablo Andújar	6^{3}	7	6

== ATP singles main-draw entrants ==
=== Seeds ===
The following are the seeded players. Seedings are based on ATP rankings as of 26 April 2021. Rankings and points before are as of 3 May 2021.

Seed	Rank	Player	Points before	Points defending	Points won	Points after	Status
1	2	(Spain) Rafael Nadal	9,810	360	180	9,630	Quarterfinals lost to (Germany) Alexander Zverev [5]
2	3	(Russia) Daniil Medvedev	9,700	10	90	9,780	Third round lost to (Chile) Cristian Garín [16]
3	4	(Austria) Dominic Thiem	8,365	360	360	8,365	Semifinals lost to (Germany) Alexander Zverev [5]
4	5	(Greece) Stefanos Tsitsipas	7,910	390	90	7,610	Third round lost to (Norway) Casper Ruud
5	6	(Germany) Alexander Zverev	6,125	180	1,000	6,945	Champion, defeated (Italy) Matteo Berrettini [8]
6	8	(Russia) Andrey Rublev	6,000	90	90	6,000	Third round lost to (United States) John Isner
7	9	(Argentina) Diego Schwartzman	3,765	67	45	3,743	Second round lost to (Russia) Aslan Karatsev
8	10	(Italy) Matteo Berrettini	3,493	45	600	4,048	Runner-up, lost to (Germany) Alexander Zverev [5]
9	11	(Spain) Roberto Bautista Agut	3,090	10	45	3,125	Second round lost to (United States) John Isner
10	12	(Spain) Pablo Carreño Busta	3,015	10	10	3,015	First round lost to (Argentina) Federico Delbonis [Q]
11	14	(Canada) Denis Shapovalov	2,820	10	45	2,855	Second round lost to (Kazakhstan) Alexander Bublik
12	16	(Poland) Hubert Hurkacz	2,600	67	10	2,543	First round lost to (Australia) John Millman
13	17	(Bulgaria) Grigor Dimitrov	2,576	10	10	2,576	First round lost to (South Africa) Lloyd Harris
14	18	(Italy) Jannik Sinner	2,524	24	45	2,545	Second round lost to (Australia) Alexei Popyrin [Q]
15	20	(Canada) Félix Auger-Aliassime	2,418	32	10	2,396	First round lost to (Norway) Casper Ruud
16	22	(Chile) Cristian Garín	2,215	45	180	2,350	Quarterfinals lost to (Italy) Matteo Berrettini [8]

=== Other entrants ===
The following players received wildcards into the main draw:

- (Spain) Carlos Alcaraz
- (Spain) Pedro Martínez
- (Spain) Jaume Munar
- (Spain) Fernando Verdasco

The following players received entry from the qualifying draw:

- (Spain) Pablo Andújar
- (Italy) Marco Cecchinato
- (Argentina) Federico Delbonis
- (United States) Marcos Giron
- (France) Pierre-Hugues Herbert
- (Australia) Alexei Popyrin
- (Spain) Carlos Taberner

The following player received entry as a lucky loser:

- (Japan) Yoshihito Nishioka

=== Withdrawals ===
Before the tournament

- (Croatia) Marin Čilić → replaced by (United States) Tommy Paul
- (Croatia) Borna Ćorić → replaced by (France) Jérémy Chardy
- (Serbia) Novak Djokovic → replaced by (Spain) Alejandro Davidovich Fokina
- (Switzerland) Roger Federer → replaced by (Serbia) Miomir Kecmanović
- (Belgium) David Goffin → replaced by (South Africa) Lloyd Harris
- (France) Gaël Monfils → replaced by (Argentina) Guido Pella
- (Canada) Milos Raonic → replaced by (Japan) Yoshihito Nishioka
- (Italy) Lorenzo Sonego → replaced by (Germany) Dominik Koepfer
- (Switzerland) Stan Wawrinka → replaced by (Spain) Albert Ramos Viñolas

=== Retirements ===
- (South Africa) Lloyd Harris
- (Argentina) Guido Pella
