= 2014 Open du Pays d'Aix =

- Date: 5 – 11 May
- Edition: 1st
- Draw: 32S / 15D
- Prize money: €64,000
- Surface: Clay
- Location: Aix-en-Provence, France

Champions

Singles
- (Argentina) Diego Schwartzman

Doubles
- (Argentina) Diego Schwartzman / (Argentina) Horacio Zeballos
Open du Pays d'Aix	· 2015 →

The 2014 Open du Pays d'Aix was a professional tennis tournament played on clay courts. It was the first edition of the tournament which was part of the 2014 ATP Challenger Tour. It took place in Aix-en-Provence, France between 5 and 11 May 2014.

== Singles main-draw entrants ==
=== Seeds ===
Country	Player	Rank^{1}	Seed
USA	Denis Kudla	103	1
SLO	Blaž Rola	106	2
ARG	Diego Sebastián Schwartzman	114	3
ARG	Horacio Zeballos	121	4
FRA	Pierre-Hugues Herbert	134	5
BRA	João Souza	135	6
GER	Andreas Beck	142	7
FRA	Marc Gicquel	146	8

- ^{1} Rankings are as of April 28, 2014.

=== Other entrants ===
The following players received wildcards into the singles main draw:

- (France) Axel Michon
- (France) Julien Obry
- (France) Florent Serra
- (France) Martin Vaisse

The following players received entry from the qualifying draw:

- (France) Jonathan Eysseric
- (France) Laurent Lokoli
- (Switzerland) Yann Marti
- (Switzerland) Henri Laaksonen

The following players received entry as a lucky loser:

- (Spain) Jordi Samper Montaña

== Doubles main-draw entrants ==
=== Seeds ===
Country	Player	Country	Player	Rank^{1}	Seed
USA	Nicholas Monroe	GER	Simon Stadler	121	1
GER	Dominik Meffert	AUT	Philipp Oswald	172	2
GER	Philipp Marx	GER	Alexander Satschko	174	3
GER	Christopher Kas	GER	Frank Moser	308	4

- ^{1} Rankings as of April 28, 2014.

=== Other entrants ===
The following pairs received wildcards into the singles main draw:

- (France) Maxime Chazal / (France) Maxime Tchoutakian
- (France) Florent Serra / (France) Maxime Teixeira
- (France) Tristan Lamasine / (France) Julien Obry

== Champions ==
=== Singles ===
- (Argentina) Diego Sebastián Schwartzman def. (Germany) Andreas Beck, 6–7^{(4–7)}, 6–3, 6–2

=== Doubles ===
- (Argentina) Diego Sebastián Schwartzman / (Argentina) Horacio Zeballos def. (Germany) Andreas Beck / (Austria) Martin Fischer, 6–4, 3–6, [10–5]
