= 2013 Copa San Juan Gobierno – Singles =

Singles
- 2013 Copa San Juan Gobierno

Final
- Champion: (Argentina) Guido Andreozzi
- Runner-up: (Argentina) Diego Schwartzman
- Score: 6–7^{(5–7)}, 7–6^{(7–4)}, 6–0

Events
Singles	Doubles
- Copa San Juan Gobierno

Thiemo de Bakker was the defending champion but chose not to compete.
Guido Andreozzi defeated top seed Diego Sebastián Schwartzman 6–7^{(5–7)}, 7–6^{(7–4)}, 6–0.

== Seeds ==
1. (Argentina) Diego Schwartzman (final)
2. (Argentina) Martín Alund (quarterfinals)
3. (Russia) Andrey Kuznetsov (first round)
4. (Spain) Rubén Ramírez Hidalgo (second round)
5. (Argentina) Facundo Bagnis (quarterfinals)
6. (Argentina) Máximo González (semifinals)
7. (Argentina) Facundo Argüello (first round)
8. (Argentina) Guido Andreozzi (champion)

== Draw ==
Key

- Q = Qualifier
- WC = Wild card
- LL = Lucky loser
- Alt = Alternate
- ITF = ITF entry
- PR = Protected ranking
- SR = Special ranking
- SE = Special exempt
- JE = Junior exempt
- JR = Junior Accelerator Programme entrant
- CO = College Accelerator Programme entrant
- NG = Next Gen Accelerator Program entrant
- w/o = Walkover
- r = Retired
- d = Defaulted

=== Finals ===
Semifinals
1	(Argentina) Diego Schwartzman	7^{7}	6
(Argentina) Juan Ignacio Londero	6^{5}	3
8	(Argentina) Guido Andreozzi	3	7^{7}	6
6	(Argentina) Máximo González	6	6^{1}	2

Final
1	(Argentina) Diego Schwartzman	7^{7}	6^{4}	0
8	(Argentina) Guido Andreozzi	6^{5}	7^{7}	6

=== Top half ===
First round
1	(Argentina) D Schwartzman	4	6	6
(Argentina) G Durán	6	0	3
(Argentina) P Heras	4	5
(Argentina) M Trungelliti	6	7
(Argentina) P Galdón	6	7^{7}
WC	(Argentina) Mateo Martinez	3	6^{5}
(Argentina) A Molteni	7^{12}	6
7	(Argentina) F Argüello	6^{10}	2
3	(Russia) A Kuznetsov	4	6	1
(Argentina) J I Londero	6	4	6
(Argentina) Maximiliano Estévez	0	3
Q	(Argentina) Francisco Bahamonde	6	6
Q	(Argentina) G Villanueva	2	1
(Croatia) K Mesaroš	6	6
Q	(Argentina) Gabriel Hidalgo	1	6	5
5	(Argentina) F Bagnis	6	3	7

Second round
1	(Argentina) D Schwartzman	2	6	6
(Argentina) M Trungelliti	6	4	1
(Argentina) P Galdón	6	6^{2}	6
(Argentina) A Molteni	3	7^{7}	4
(Argentina) J I Londero	6	6
Q	(Argentina) F Bahamonde	1	4
(Croatia) K Mesaroš	3	2
5	(Argentina) F Bagnis	6	6

Quarterfinals
1	(Argentina) D Schwartzman	6	6
(Argentina) P Galdón	3	0
(Argentina) J I Londero	6	6
5	(Argentina) F Bagnis	4	4

Semifinals
1	(Argentina) D Schwartzman	7^{7}	6
(Argentina) J I Londero	6^{5}	3

=== Bottom half ===
First round
8	(Argentina) G Andreozzi	4	6	6
(Chile) C Garin	6	2	1
(Chile) G Lama	7^{7}	6
WC	(Argentina) P Cachin	6^{1}	3
(Ecuador) E Gómez	6	3	4
(Argentina) R Olivo	3	6	6
WC	(Argentina) T Lipovšek Puches	2	1
4	(Spain) R Ramírez Hidalgo	6	6
6	(Argentina) M González	6	6
WC	(Argentina) Facundo Alvo	4	3
Q	(Argentina) Joaquin Monteferrario	2	4
(Argentina) A Collarini	6	6
(Italy) S Travaglia	6	6
PR	(France) Laurent Rochette	3	4
(Argentina) E Schwank	6^{4}	6^{1}
2	(Argentina) M Alund	7^{7}	7^{7}

Second round
8	(Argentina) G Andreozzi	6	7^{7}
(Chile) G Lama	4	6^{3}
(Argentina) R Olivo	6	6
4	(Spain) R Ramírez Hidalgo	3	2
6	(Argentina) M González	6	7^{7}
(Argentina) A Collarini	4	6^{4}
(Italy) S Travaglia	4	7^{9}	2
2	(Argentina) M Alund	6	6^{7}	6

Quarterfinals
8	(Argentina) G Andreozzi	6	4	6
(Argentina) R Olivo	3	6	4
6	(Argentina) M González	6	6
2	(Argentina) M Alund	2	1

Semifinals
8	(Argentina) G Andreozzi	3	7^{7}	6
6	(Argentina) M González	6	6^{1}	2
