= 2019 Mutua Madrid Open – Men's singles =

Men's singles
- 2019 Mutua Madrid Open

Final
- Champion: (Serbia) Novak Djokovic
- Runner-up: (Greece) Stefanos Tsitsipas
- Score: 6–3, 6–4

Details
- Draw: 56 (7 Q / 4 WC )
- Seeds: 16

Events
Singles	men	women
Doubles	men	women
← 2018 ·	Mutua Madrid Open	· 2021 →

Novak Djokovic defeated Stefanos Tsitsipas in the final, 6–3, 6–4 to win the men's singles tennis title at the 2019 Madrid Open. It was his 33rd Masters 1000 singles title, tying Rafael Nadal's record. Djokovic did not lose a set during the tournament.

Alexander Zverev was the defending champion, but lost in the quarterfinals to Tsitsipas.

This tournament marked the last professional appearance of 2013 French Open runner-up and former world No. 3 David Ferrer; he lost in the second round to Zverev. This was Roger Federer's first clay court tournament since the 2016 Italian Open, and marked the three-time champion's last appearance at the Madrid Open.

== Seeds ==
The top eight seeds received a bye into the second round.

1. (Serbia) Novak Djokovic (champion)
2. (Spain) Rafael Nadal (semifinals)
3. (Germany) Alexander Zverev (quarterfinals)
4. (Switzerland) Roger Federer (quarterfinals)
5. (Austria) Dominic Thiem (semifinals)
6. (Japan) Kei Nishikori (third round)
7. (Argentina) Juan Martín del Potro (second round)
8. (Greece) Stefanos Tsitsipas (final)

9. (Croatia) Marin Čilić (quarterfinals, withdrew due to illness)
10. (Italy) Fabio Fognini (third round)
11. (Russia) Karen Khachanov (second round)
12. (Russia) Daniil Medvedev (first round)
13. (Croatia) Borna Ćorić (first round)
14. (Georgia (country)) Nikoloz Basilashvili (first round)
15. (France) Gaël Monfils (third round)
16. (Italy) Marco Cecchinato (first round)

Click on the seed number of a player to go to their draw section.

== Draw ==
=== Key ===
- Q = Qualifier
- WC = Wild card
- LL = Lucky loser
- Alt = Alternate
- ITF = ITF entry
- PR = Protected ranking
- SR = Special ranking
- SE = Special exempt
- JE = Junior exempt
- JR = Junior Accelerator Programme entrant
- CO = College Accelerator Programme entrant
- NG = Next Gen Accelerator Program entrant
- w/o = Walkover
- r = Retired
- d = Defaulted

=== Finals ===
Quarterfinals
1	(Serbia) Novak Djokovic	w/o
9	(Croatia) Marin Čilić
4	(Switzerland) Roger Federer	6	6^{11}	4
5	(Austria) Dominic Thiem	3	7^{13}	6
8	(Greece) Stefanos Tsitsipas	7	3	6
3	(Germany) Alexander Zverev	5	6	2
(Switzerland) Stan Wawrinka	1	2
2	(Spain) Rafael Nadal	6	6

Semifinals
1	(Serbia) Novak Djokovic	7^{7}	7^{7}
5	(Austria) Dominic Thiem	6^{2}	6^{4}
8	(Greece) Stefanos Tsitsipas	6	2	6
2	(Spain) Rafael Nadal	4	6	3

Final
1	(Serbia) Novak Djokovic	6	6
8	(Greece) Stefanos Tsitsipas	3	4

=== Top half ===
==== Section 1 ====
First round
Q	(United States) T Fritz	7^{10}	7^{7}
(Bulgaria) G Dimitrov	6^{8}	6^{4}
(France) J Chardy	6	4	7
Q	(Spain) A Ramos Viñolas	2	6	5
(Argentina) D Schwartzman	6	4	6
16	(Italy) M Cecchinato	0	6	1
9	(Croatia) M Čilić	6	2	7^{7}
Q	(Slovakia) M Kližan	4	6	6^{0}
(Australia) N Kyrgios	6^{4}	4
(Germany) J-L Struff	7^{7}	6
(Serbia) D Lajović	4	4
(Serbia) L Đere	6	6

Second round
1	(Serbia) N Djokovic	6	6
Q	(United States) T Fritz	4	2
(France) J Chardy	6	6
(Argentina) D Schwartzman	1	2
9	(Croatia) M Čilić	4	6	6
(Germany) J-L Struff	6	3	4
(Serbia) L Đere	6	2	7
7	(Argentina) JM del Potro	3	6	5

Third round
1	(Serbia) N Djokovic	6	7^{7}
(France) J Chardy	1	6^{2}
9	(Croatia) M Čilić	4	6	6
(Serbia) L Đere	6	3	2

Quarterfinals
1	(Serbia) N Djokovic	w/o
9	(Croatia) M Čilić

==== Section 2 ====
First round
(France) R Gasquet	7	7^{7}
WC	(Spain) A Davidovich Fokina	5	6^{5}
(Belgium) D Goffin	4	5
(Hungary) M Fucsovics	6	7
(Italy) A Seppi	3	1
15	(France) G Monfils	6	6
10	(Italy) F Fognini	6	6
(United Kingdom) K Edmund	4	3
(Australia) J Millman	7^{7}	7^{7}
(United States) S Johnson	6^{5}	6^{5}
Q	(United States) R Opelka	7^{7}	6
(Spain) P Carreño Busta	6^{5}	4

Second round
4	(Switzerland) R Federer	6	6
(France) R Gasquet	2	3
(Hungary) M Fucsovics	6	4	2
15	(France) G Monfils	1	6	6
10	(Italy) F Fognini	6	6
(Australia) J Millman	2	2
Q	(United States) R Opelka	7^{7}	3	0^{r}
5	(Austria) D Thiem	6^{2}	6	1

Third round
4	(Switzerland) R Federer	6	4	7^{7}
15	(France) G Monfils	0	6	6^{3}
10	(Italy) F Fognini	4	5
5	(Austria) D Thiem	6	7

Quarterfinals
4	(Switzerland) R Federer	6	6^{11}	4
5	(Austria) D Thiem	3	7^{13}	6

=== Bottom half ===
==== Section 3 ====
First round
LL	(France) A Mannarino	7	5	6
(Portugal) J Sousa	5	7	1
(Moldova) R Albot	2	6	1
(Spain) F Verdasco	6	3	6
WC	(Spain) J Munar	4	7^{7}	3
11	(Russia) K Khachanov	6	6^{5}	6
13	(Croatia) B Ćorić	3	5
(France) L Pouille	6	7
(Australia) A de Minaur	3	4
Q	(Poland) H Hurkacz	6	6
WC	(Spain) D Ferrer	6	4	6
(Spain) R Bautista Agut	4	6	4

Second round
8	(Greece) S Tsitsipas	6	7
LL	(France) A Mannarino	2	5
(Spain) F Verdasco	6^{4}	6	7
11	(Russia) K Khachanov	7^{7}	1	5
(France) L Pouille	5	1
Q	(Poland) H Hurkacz	7	6
WC	(Spain) D Ferrer	4	1
3	(Germany) A Zverev	6	6

Third round
8	(Greece) S Tsitsipas	6	6
(Spain) F Verdasco	3	4
Q	(Poland) H Hurkacz	6	4	4
3	(Germany) A Zverev	3	6	6

Quarterfinals
8	(Greece) S Tsitsipas	7	3	6
3	(Germany) A Zverev	5	6	2

==== Section 4 ====
First round
(France) G Simon	6	1	6^{4}
Q	(Bolivia) H Dellien	4	6	7^{7}
(Switzerland) S Wawrinka	6	6
Q	(France) P-H Herbert	2	3
(Argentina) G Pella	6	1	6
12	(Russia) D Medvedev	2	6	3
14	(Georgia (country)) N Basilashvili	7^{10}	3	4
(United States) F Tiafoe	6^{8}	6	6
(Germany) P Kohlschreiber	6	7^{7}
(Kazakhstan) M Kukushkin	2	6^{5}
WC	(Canada) F Auger-Aliassime	6	7^{9}
(Canada) D Shapovalov	2	6^{7}

Second round
6	(Japan) K Nishikori	7	7
Q	(Bolivia) H Dellien	5	5
(Switzerland) S Wawrinka	6	6
(Argentina) G Pella	3	4
(United States) F Tiafoe	6	3	6
(Germany) P Kohlschreiber	4	6	3
WC	(Canada) F Auger-Aliassime	3	3
2	(Spain) R Nadal	6	6

Third round
6	(Japan) K Nishikori	3	6^{3}
(Switzerland) S Wawrinka	6	7^{7}
(United States) F Tiafoe	3	4
2	(Spain) R Nadal	6	6

Quarterfinals
(Switzerland) S Wawrinka	1	2
2	(Spain) R Nadal	6	6

== Qualifying ==
=== Seeds ===
1. (France) Pierre-Hugues Herbert (qualified)
2. (France) Benoît Paire (first round)
3. (Poland) Hubert Hurkacz (qualified)
4. (Bosnia and Herzegovina) Damir Džumhur (first round)
5. (France) Adrian Mannarino (qualifying competition, lucky loser)
6. (United States) Mackenzie McDonald (first round)
7. (United States) Taylor Fritz (qualified)
8. (United States) Reilly Opelka (qualified)
9. (Slovakia) Martin Kližan (qualified)
10. (Argentina) Leonardo Mayer (first round)
11. (Netherlands) Robin Haase (qualifying competition)
12. (France) Ugo Humbert (first round)
13. (Chile) Nicolás Jarry (first round)
14. (Japan) Taro Daniel (first round)

=== Qualifiers ===
1. (France) Pierre-Hugues Herbert
2. (Spain) Albert Ramos Viñolas
3. (Poland) Hubert Hurkacz
4. (Bolivia) Hugo Dellien
5. (Slovakia) Martin Kližan
6. (United States) Reilly Opelka
7. (United States) Taylor Fritz

=== Lucky loser ===
1. (France) Adrian Mannarino

=== Qualifying draw ===
==== First qualifier ====
First round
1	(France) Pierre-Hugues Herbert	6	6
Alt	(United States) Denis Kudla	3	4
(Australia) Bernard Tomic	7^{8}	2	5
11	(Netherlands) Robin Haase	6^{6}	6	7

Qualifying competition
1	(France) Pierre-Hugues Herbert	5	6	7^{7}
11	(Netherlands) Robin Haase	7	3	6^{5}

==== Second qualifier ====
First round
2	(France) Benoît Paire	1	1
(Norway) Casper Ruud	6	6
(Spain) Albert Ramos Viñolas	3	6	7^{7}
14	(Japan) Taro Daniel	6	3	6^{2}

Qualifying competition
(Norway) Casper Ruud	6	6^{3}	1
(Spain) Albert Ramos Viñolas	2	7^{7}	6

==== Third qualifier ====
First round
3	(Poland) Hubert Hurkacz	6	6
WC	(Spain) Marcel Granollers	0	2
WC	(Spain) Roberto Carballés Baena	7^{7}	6
12	(France) Ugo Humbert	6^{1}	1

Qualifying competition
3	(Poland) Hubert Hurkacz	6	6
WC	(Spain) Roberto Carballés Baena	4	4

==== Fourth qualifier ====
First round
4	(Bosnia and Herzegovina) Damir Džumhur	3	6	3
(Argentina) Guido Andreozzi	6	1	6
(Bolivia) Hugo Dellien	6	6
10	(Argentina) Leonardo Mayer	2	4

Qualifying competition
(Argentina) Guido Andreozzi	6	4	2
(Bolivia) Hugo Dellien	3	6	6

==== Fifth qualifier ====
First round
5	(France) Adrian Mannarino	6	6^{5}	7
WC	(Spain) Jorge Plans	4	7^{7}	5
(Latvia) Ernests Gulbis	4	6^{7}
9	(Slovakia) Martin Kližan	6	7^{9}

Qualifying competition
5	(France) Adrian Mannarino	3	2
9	(Slovakia) Martin Kližan	6	6

==== Sixth qualifier ====
First round
6	(United States) Mackenzie McDonald	1	2
(Argentina) Juan Ignacio Londero	6	6
(Germany) Mischa Zverev	6^{2}	6^{3}
8	(United States) Reilly Opelka	7^{7}	7^{7}

Qualifying competition
(Argentina) Juan Ignacio Londero	6^{7}	7	2
8	(United States) Reilly Opelka	7^{9}	5	6

==== Seventh qualifier ====
First round
7	(United States) Taylor Fritz	6	6
WC	(Spain) Nicola Kuhn	4	3
(Romania) Marius Copil	5	6	7^{7}
13	(Chile) Nicolás Jarry	7	4	6^{2}

Qualifying competition
7	(United States) Taylor Fritz	7^{7}	7
(Romania) Marius Copil	6^{5}	5
