= Copa San Juan Gobierno =

- 2014 Copa San Juan Gobierno

Defunct tennis tournament
- Location: San Juan, Argentina
- Category: ATP Challenger Tour
- Surface: Clay
- Draw: 32S/16Q/16D
- Prize money: US$35,000+H

The Copa San Juan Gobierno is a tennis tournament held in San Juan, Argentina since 2012. The event has been part of the ATP Challenger Tour from 2012 until 2014. From 2015 on, the event is part of the ITF Men's Circuit. The tournament is played on clay courts, until 2016 at the Club Banco Hispano and from 2017 on at the San Juan Lawn Tennis Club.

== Past finals ==
=== Singles ===
Year	Champion	Runner-up	Score	Ref.
2014	(Argentina) Diego Schwartzman	(Brazil) João Souza	7–6^{(7–5)}, 6–3	
2013	(Argentina) Guido Andreozzi	(Argentina) Diego Schwartzman	6–7^{(5–7)}, 7–6^{(7–4)}, 6–0	
2012	(Netherlands) Thiemo de Bakker	(Argentina) Martín Alund	6–2, 3–6, 6–2	

=== Doubles ===
Year	Champions	Runners-up	Score
2014	(Argentina) Martín Alund (Argentina) Facundo Bagnis	(Argentina) Diego Sebastián Schwartzman (Argentina) Horacio Zeballos	4–6, 6–3, [10–7]
2013	(Argentina) Guillermo Durán (Argentina) Máximo González	(Argentina) Martín Alund (Argentina) Facundo Bagnis	6–3, 6–0
2012	(Argentina) Martín Alund (Argentina) Horacio Zeballos	(United States) Nicholas Monroe (Germany) Simon Stadler	3–6, 6–2, [14–12]
