= 2015 Open du Pays d'Aix – Doubles =

Doubles
- 2015 Open du Pays d'Aix

Final
- Champions: (Netherlands) Robin Haase (Pakistan) Aisam-ul-Haq Qureshi
- Runners-up: (United States) Nicholas Monroe (New Zealand) Artem Sitak
- Score: 6–1, 6–2

Events
Singles	Doubles
← 2014 ·	Open du Pays d'Aix	· 2016 →

Diego Schwartzman and Horacio Zeballos were the defending champions, but they did not participate this year.

Robin Haase and Aisam-ul-Haq Qureshi won the title, defeating Nicholas Monroe and Artem Sitak in the final, 6–1, 6–2.

== Seeds ==
1. (Netherlands) Robin Haase / (Pakistan) Aisam-ul-Haq Qureshi (champions)
2. (United States) Nicholas Monroe / (New Zealand) Artem Sitak (final)
3. (United Kingdom) Colin Fleming / (United Kingdom) Jonathan Marray (semifinals)
4. (Sweden) Johan Brunström / (Israel) Jonathan Erlich (quarterfinals)

== Draw ==
=== Key ===
- Q = Qualifier
- WC = Wild card
- LL = Lucky loser
- Alt = Alternate
- SE = Special exempt
- PR = Protected ranking
- ITF = ITF entry
- JE = Junior exempt
- w/o = Walkover
- r = Retired
- d = Defaulted
- SR = Special ranking

First round
1	(Netherlands) R Haase (Pakistan) A-u-H Qureshi	6	6^{3}	[10]
(United Kingdom) K Skupski (United Kingdom) N Skupski	3	7^{7}	[4]
(Kazakhstan) A Golubev (Kazakhstan) A Nedovyesov	7^{7}	7^{7}
(Germany) M Emmrich (Sweden) A Siljeström	6^{4}	6^{5}
3	(United Kingdom) C Fleming (United Kingdom) J Marray	6	6
WC	(France) M Bourgue (France) D Guez	1	0
(Tunisia) M Jaziri (Germany) P Petzschner	6	6
WC	(France) M Chazal (France) C Lestienne	4	4
(France) F Martin (India) P Raja	6	7^{7}
(Slovakia) N Gombos (Estonia) J Zopp	1	6^{5}
(Germany) M Bachinger (Germany) D Meffert	5	1
4	(Sweden) J Brunström (Israel) J Erlich	7	6
Alt	(Germany) A Beck (Australia) J Millman	1	2
(New Zealand) M Daniell (Germany) F Moser	6	6
(France) P-H Herbert (France) P-H Mathieu	4	2
2	(United States) N Monroe (New Zealand) A Sitak	6	6

Quarterfinals
1	(Netherlands) R Haase (Pakistan) A-u-H Qureshi	2	7^{7}	[10]
(Kazakhstan) A Golubev (Kazakhstan) A Nedovyesov	6	6^{5}	[6]
3	(United Kingdom) C Fleming (United Kingdom) J Marray	4	6	[10]
(Tunisia) M Jaziri (Germany) P Petzschner	6	3	[7]
(France) F Martin (India) P Raja	6	6
4	(Sweden) J Brunström (Israel) J Erlich	1	4
(New Zealand) M Daniell (Germany) F Moser	3	6	[6]
2	(United States) N Monroe (New Zealand) A Sitak	6	4	[10]

Semifinals
1	(Netherlands) R Haase (Pakistan) A-u-H Qureshi	7^{7}	6
3	(United Kingdom) C Fleming (United Kingdom) J Marray	6^{2}	3
(France) F Martin (India) P Raja	4	4
2	(United States) N Monroe (New Zealand) A Sitak	6	6

Final
1	(Netherlands) R Haase (Pakistan) A-u-H Qureshi	6	6
2	(United States) N Monroe (New Zealand) A Sitak	1	2
