= 2021 Open du Pays d'Aix – Doubles =

Doubles
- 2021 Open du Pays d'Aix

Final
- Champions: (France) Sadio Doumbia (France) Fabien Reboul
- Runners-up: (United States) Robert Galloway (United States) Alex Lawson
- Score: 6–7^{(4–7)}, 7–5, [10–4]

Events
Singles	Doubles
← 2020 ·	Open du Pays d'Aix	· 2022 →

Andrés Molteni and Hugo Nys were the defending champions but chose not to defend their title.

Sadio Doumbia and Fabien Reboul won the title after defeating Robert Galloway and Alex Lawson 6–7^{(4–7)}, 7–5, [10–4] in the final.

== Seeds ==
1. (Brazil) Rafael Matos / (Ukraine) Denys Molchanov (first round)
2. (Brazil) Fernando Romboli / (Spain) David Vega Hernández (quarterfinals)
3. (United States) Robert Galloway / (United States) Alex Lawson (final)
4. (France) Sadio Doumbia / (France) Fabien Reboul (champions)

== Draw ==
=== Key ===
- Q = Qualifier
- WC = Wild card
- LL = Lucky loser
- Alt = Alternate
- SE = Special exempt
- PR = Protected ranking
- ITF = ITF entry
- JE = Junior exempt
- w/o = Walkover
- r = Retired
- d = Defaulted
- SR = Special ranking

First round
1	(Brazil) R Matos (Ukraine) D Molchanov	0	7^{7}	[8]
(Poland) S Walków (Poland) J Zieliński	6	6^{5}	[10]
(France) T Lamasine (France) A Olivetti	6	6
WC	(France) T Droguet (France) K Jacquet	4	4
4	(France) S Doumbia (France) F Reboul	6	6
(Argentina) A Collarini (Argentina) R Olivo	4	2
(Argentina) F Cerúndolo (Spain) C Gómez-Herrera	6	6
WC	(France) G Blancaneaux (France) M Martineau	3	2
WC	(Belgium) M Geerts (France) M Janvier	3	7^{7}	[10]
PR	(United States) J Cerretani (Romania) VV Cornea	6	6^{5}	[8]
(France) J Eysseric (France) M Guinard	6^{5}	3
3	(United States) R Galloway (United States) A Lawson	7^{7}	6
(Poland) K Drzewiecki (Spain) S Martos Gornés	7	6
(Uruguay) M Cuevas (Peru) JP Varillas	5	2
Alt	(Tunisia) A Dougaz (Argentina) A Velotti	5	4
2	(Brazil) F Romboli (Spain) D Vega Hernández	7	6

Quarterfinals
(Poland) S Walków (Poland) J Zieliński	6	7
(France) T Lamasine (France) A Olivetti	4	5
4	(France) S Doumbia (France) F Reboul	w/o
(Argentina) F Cerúndolo (Spain) C Gómez-Herrera
WC	(Belgium) M Geerts (France) M Janvier	4	2
3	(United States) R Galloway (United States) A Lawson	6	6
(Poland) K Drzewiecki (Spain) S Martos Gornés	6	3	[12]
2	(Brazil) F Romboli (Spain) D Vega Hernández	3	6	[10]

Semifinals
(Poland) S Walków (Poland) J Zieliński	6^{6}	4
4	(France) S Doumbia (France) F Reboul	7^{8}	6
3	(United States) R Galloway (United States) A Lawson	6	7
(Poland) K Drzewiecki (Spain) S Martos Gornés	3	5

Final
4	(France) S Doumbia (France) F Reboul	6^{4}	7	[10]
3	(United States) R Galloway (United States) A Lawson	7^{7}	5	[4]
