= 2015 Open du Pays d'Aix – Singles =

Singles
- 2015 Open du Pays d'Aix

Final
- Champion: (Netherlands) Robin Haase
- Runner-up: (France) Paul-Henri Mathieu
- Score: 7–6 ^{(7–1)}, 6–2

Events
Singles	Doubles
← 2014 ·	Open du Pays d'Aix	· 2016 →

Diego Schwartzman was the defending champion but chose not to compete.

Robin Haase took the title, beating Paul-Henri Mathieu 7–6 ^{(7–1)}, 6–2

== Seeds ==
1. (Slovenia) Blaž Kavčič (first round)
2. (Tunisia) Malek Jaziri (semifinal, retired)
3. (France) Lucas Pouille (withdrew)
4. (Netherlands) Robin Haase (champion)
5. (Serbia) Filip Krajinović (first round)
6. (Slovakia) Norbert Gombos (first round)
7. (Kazakhstan) Andrey Golubev (second round)
8. (Germany) Alexander Zverev (semifinals)

== Draw ==
=== Key ===
- Q = Qualifier
- WC = Wild card
- LL = Lucky loser
- Alt = Alternate
- SE = Special exempt
- PR = Protected ranking
- ITF = ITF entry
- JE = Junior exempt
- w/o = Walkover
- r = Retired
- d = Defaulted
- SR = Special ranking

=== Finals ===
Semifinals
(France) Paul-Henri Mathieu	6	4	7
8	(Germany) Alexander Zverev	4	6	5
4	(Netherlands) Robin Haase	6	2
2	(Tunisia) Malek Jaziri	3	0^{r}

Final
(France) Paul-Henri Mathieu	6^{1}	2
4	(Netherlands) Robin Haase	7^{7}	6

=== Top half ===
First round
1	(Slovenia) B Kavčič	6^{5}	3
(Australia) J Millman	7^{7}	6
(France) D Guez	5	4
SE	(Spain) Í Cervantes	7	6
(Portugal) G Elias	3	2
(France) P-H Mathieu	6	6
(Kazakhstan) A Nedovyesov	6	4	3
7	(Kazakhstan) A Golubev	4	6	6
LL	(France) A Escoffier	1	1
WC	(France) Q Halys	6	6
(Brazil) A Ghem	7^{7}	6
(Germany) A Beck	6^{3}	2
WC	(France) C Lestienne	7	5	1
Q	(Brazil) J Pereira	5	7	6
(Poland) M Przysiężny	4	0^{r}
8	(Germany) A Zverev	6	3

Second round
(Australia) J Millman	6	6
SE	(Spain) Í Cervantes	1	1
(France) P-H Mathieu	6	7
7	(Kazakhstan) A Golubev	1	5
WC	(France) Q Halys	5	2
(Brazil) A Ghem	7	6
Q	(Brazil) J Pereira	1	6^{6}
8	(Germany) A Zverev	6	7^{8}

Quarterfinals
(Australia) J Millman	5	4
(France) P-H Mathieu	7	6
(Brazil) A Ghem	6^{3}	4
8	(Germany) A Zverev	7^{7}	6

Semifinals
(France) P-H Mathieu	6	4	7
8	(Germany) A Zverev	4	6	5

=== Bottom half ===
First round
5	(Serbia) F Krajinović	3	3
Q	(Switzerland) Y Marti	6	6
(France) M Bourgue	5	3
Q	(France) J Eysseric	7	6
LL	(Poland) A Kapaś	7^{7}	6
(Spain) D Muñoz de la Nava	6^{3}	3
(Germany) M Bachinger	6	4	3
4	(Netherlands) R Haase	3	6	6
6	(Slovakia) N Gombos	4	6	2
WC	(Germany) F Mayer	6	3	6
Q	(France) Laurent Rochette	6	6
(France) T Lamasine	4	3
(Spain) A Montañés	6	3	2
SE	(France) M Hamou	4	6	6
(Estonia) J Zopp	5	7^{7}	1
2	(Tunisia) M Jaziri	7	6^{4}	6

Second round
Q	(Switzerland) Y Marti	3	6	4
Q	(France) J Eysseric	6	1	6
LL	(Poland) A Kapaś	1	4
4	(Netherlands) R Haase	6	6
WC	(Germany) F Mayer	6	4	4
Q	(France) L Rochette	2	6	6
SE	(France) M Hamou	4	4
2	(Tunisia) M Jaziri	6	6

Quarterfinals
Q	(France) J Eysseric	0	4
4	(Netherlands) R Haase	6	6
Q	(France) L Rochette	1	1
2	(Tunisia) M Jaziri	6	6

Semifinals
4	(Netherlands) R Haase	6	2
2	(Tunisia) M Jaziri	3	0^{r}
