= 2018 Open du Pays d'Aix – Doubles =

Doubles
- 2018 Open du Pays d'Aix

Final
- Champions: (Germany) Philipp Petzschner (Germany) Tim Pütz
- Runners-up: (Argentina) Guido Andreozzi (France) Kenny de Schepper
- Score: 6–7^{(3–7)}, 6–2, [10–8]

Events
Singles	Doubles
← 2017 ·	Open du Pays d'Aix	· 2019 →

Wesley Koolhof and Matwé Middelkoop were the defending champions but chose not to defend their title.

Philipp Petzschner and Tim Pütz won the title after defeating Guido Andreozzi and Kenny de Schepper 6–7^{(3–7)}, 6–2, [10–8] in the final.

== Seeds ==
1. (France) Fabrice Martin / (India) Purav Raja (first round)
2. (Germany) Andre Begemann / (Croatia) Antonio Šančić (first round)
3. (Argentina) Guillermo Durán / (Argentina) Máximo González (quarterfinals)
4. (Israel) Jonathan Erlich / (United States) Scott Lipsky (first round)

== Draw ==
=== Key ===
- Q = Qualifier
- WC = Wild card
- LL = Lucky loser
- Alt = Alternate
- SE = Special exempt
- PR = Protected ranking
- ITF = ITF entry
- JE = Junior exempt
- w/o = Walkover
- r = Retired
- d = Defaulted
- SR = Special ranking

First round
1	(France) F Martin (India) P Raja	6^{4}	5
(France) J Eysseric (United Kingdom) J Salisbury	7^{7}	7
(United States) B Klahn (Canada) P Polansky	7	7
WC	(France) C Hemery (France) A Müller	5	5
4	(Israel) J Erlich (United States) S Lipsky	3	6	[6]
(Australia) J Millman (Brazil) T Monteiro	6	2	[10]
(Argentina) G Andreozzi (France) K de Schepper	6^{2}	6	[13]
(Moldova) R Albot (Belarus) A Vasilevski	7^{7}	1	[11]
(Sweden) R Lindstedt (Ukraine) S Stakhovsky	6^{4}	3
(Germany) P Petzschner (Germany) T Pütz	7^{7}	6
WC	(France) B Bonzi (France) G Jacq	3	4
3	(Argentina) G Durán (Argentina) M González	6	6
WC	(France) G Blancaneaux (France) C Lestienne	4	4
(Germany) M Moraing (Germany) O Otte	6	6
(Monaco) R Arneodo (France) H Nys	6	4	[10]
2	(Germany) A Begemann (Croatia) A Šančić	3	6	[6]

Quarterfinals
(France) J Eysseric (United Kingdom) J Salisbury	6^{8}	4
(United States) B Klahn (Canada) P Polansky	7^{10}	6
(Australia) J Millman (Brazil) T Monteiro	6	3	[6]
(Argentina) G Andreozzi (France) K de Schepper	4	6	[10]
(Germany) P Petzschner (Germany) T Pütz	7	3	[10]
3	(Argentina) G Durán (Argentina) M González	5	6	[6]
(Germany) M Moraing (Germany) O Otte	6^{8}	6	[11]
(Monaco) R Arneodo (France) H Nys	7^{10}	2	[9]

Semifinals
(United States) B Klahn (Canada) P Polansky	1	6	[8]
(Argentina) G Andreozzi (France) K de Schepper	6	0	[10]
(Germany) P Petzschner (Germany) T Pütz	6	6
(Germany) M Moraing (Germany) O Otte	3	1

Final
(Argentina) G Andreozzi (France) K de Schepper	7^{7}	2	[8]
(Germany) P Petzschner (Germany) T Pütz	6^{3}	6	[10]
