= 2019 Open du Pays d'Aix – Doubles =

Doubles
- 2019 Open du Pays d'Aix

Final
- Champions: (Germany) Kevin Krawietz (Austria) Jürgen Melzer
- Runners-up: (Denmark) Frederik Nielsen (Germany) Tim Pütz
- Score: 7–6^{(7–5)}, 6–2

Events
Singles	Doubles
← 2018 ·	Open du Pays d'Aix	· 2020 →

Philipp Petzschner and Tim Pütz were the defending champions but only Pütz chose to defend his title, partnering Frederik Nielsen. Pütz lost in the final to Kevin Krawietz and Jürgen Melzer.

Krawietz and Melzer won the title after defeating Nielsen and Pütz 7–6^{(7–5)}, 6–2 in the final.

== Seeds ==
1. (Denmark) Frederik Nielsen / (Germany) Tim Pütz (final)
2. (Germany) Kevin Krawietz / (Austria) Jürgen Melzer (champions)
3. (El Salvador) Marcelo Arévalo / (Mexico) Miguel Ángel Reyes-Varela (quarterfinals)
4. (New Zealand) Marcus Daniell / (Belgium) Sander Gillé (first round)

== Draw ==
=== Key ===
- Q = Qualifier
- WC = Wild card
- LL = Lucky loser
- Alt = Alternate
- SE = Special exempt
- PR = Protected ranking
- ITF = ITF entry
- JE = Junior exempt
- w/o = Walkover
- r = Retired
- d = Defaulted
- SR = Special ranking

First round
1	(Denmark) F Nielsen (Germany) T Pütz	7^{7}	6
WC	(France) D Added (France) A Olivetti	6^{4}	2
(Germany) A Begemann (France) F Martin	4	7	[10]
(France) A Hoang (Belgium) J Vliegen	6	5	[8]
4	(New Zealand) M Daniell (Belgium) S Gillé	6^{5}	6^{3}
(United States) J Cerretani (United States) N Monroe	7^{7}	7^{7}
(Italy) S Bolelli (Argentina) G Durán	6	6
(Uruguay) A Behar (Italy) S Travaglia	3	3
(China) M Gong (China) Ze Zhang	4	3
WC	(France) E Couacaud (France) T Lamasine	6	6
(Czech Republic) R Jebavý (Czech Republic) J Veselý	3	5
3	(El Salvador) M Arévalo (Mexico) MÁ Reyes-Varela	6	7
(Monaco) R Arneodo (Monaco) H Nys	6	6
(Spain) G García López (India) L Paes	4	4
WC	(France) G Barrère (France) Q Halys
2	(Germany) K Krawietz (Austria) J Melzer	w/o

Quarterfinals
1	(Denmark) F Nielsen (Germany) T Pütz	7^{7}	6
(Germany) A Begemann (France) F Martin	6^{4}	1
(United States) J Cerretani (United States) N Monroe	3	2
(Italy) S Bolelli (Argentina) G Durán	6	6
WC	(France) E Couacaud (France) T Lamasine	7^{9}	7
3	(El Salvador) M Arévalo (Mexico) MÁ Reyes-Varela	6^{7}	5
(Monaco) R Arneodo (Monaco) H Nys	3	3
2	(Germany) K Krawietz (Austria) J Melzer	6	6

Semifinals
1	(Denmark) F Nielsen (Germany) T Pütz	6^{5}	6	[10]
(Italy) S Bolelli (Argentina) G Durán	7^{7}	4	[4]
WC	(France) E Couacaud (France) T Lamasine	4	2
2	(Germany) K Krawietz (Austria) J Melzer	6	6

Final
1	(Denmark) F Nielsen (Germany) T Pütz	6^{5}	2
2	(Germany) K Krawietz (Austria) J Melzer	7^{7}	6
