= 2019 Open du Pays d'Aix – Singles =

Singles
- 2019 Open du Pays d'Aix

Final
- Champion: (Uruguay) Pablo Cuevas
- Runner-up: (France) Quentin Halys
- Score: 7–5, 3–6, 6–2

Events
Singles	Doubles
← 2018 ·	Open du Pays d'Aix	· 2020 →

John Millman was the defending champion but chose not to defend his title.

Pablo Cuevas won the title after defeating Quentin Halys 7–5, 3–6, 6–2 in the final.

== Seeds ==
All seeds receive a bye into the second round.

1. (Uruguay) Pablo Cuevas (champion)
2. (Czech Republic) Jiří Veselý (second round)
3. (South Africa) Lloyd Harris (third round)
4. (Uzbekistan) Denis Istomin (second round)
5. (Brazil) Thiago Monteiro (third round)
6. (Germany) Yannick Maden (second round)
7. (France) Grégoire Barrère (second round)
8. (Spain) Guillermo García López (second round)
9. (Canada) Peter Polansky (second round)
10. (Italy) Stefano Travaglia (third round)
11. (France) Antoine Hoang (third round)
12. (Italy) Gianluca Mager (quarterfinals)
13. (United States) Marcos Giron (second round)
14. (Germany) Rudolf Molleker (third round)
15. (Italy) Simone Bolelli (withdrew)
16. (Italy) Lorenzo Giustino (second round)

== Draw ==
=== Key ===
- Q = Qualifier
- WC = Wild card
- LL = Lucky loser
- Alt = Alternate
- SE = Special exempt
- PR = Protected ranking
- ITF = ITF entry
- JE = Junior exempt
- w/o = Walkover
- r = Retired
- d = Defaulted
- SR = Special ranking

=== Finals ===
Quarterfinals
1	(Uruguay) Pablo Cuevas	7^{7}	4	6
Q	(Sweden) Elias Ymer	6^{1}	6	3
(Germany) Daniel Masur	6	5	5
Alt	(Monaco) Hugo Nys	4	7	7
(Russia) Alexey Vatutin	7	7^{7}
(Germany) Benjamin Hassan	5	6^{3}
12	(Italy) Gianluca Mager	7^{7}	4	4
(France) Quentin Halys	6^{5}	6	6

Semifinals
1	(Uruguay) Pablo Cuevas	6	6
Alt	(Monaco) Hugo Nys	3	1
(Russia) Alexey Vatutin	5	3
(France) Quentin Halys	7	6

Final
1	(Uruguay) Pablo Cuevas	7	3	6
(France) Quentin Halys	5	6	2

=== Top half ===
==== Section 1 ====
First round
(Canada) S Diez	6	6
LL	(Austria) J Melzer	3	3
WC	(France) M Martineau	6	7^{8}
(Switzerland) M-A Hüsler	3	6^{6}
(Brazil) G Clezar	2	3
(Brazil) R Dutra Silva	6	6
(China) Ze Zhang	7	2	3
Q	(Sweden) E Ymer	5	6	6

Second round
1	(Uruguay) P Cuevas	4	7^{7}	7
(Canada) S Diez	6	6^{2}	5
WC	(France) M Martineau	5	7^{7}	3
14	(Germany) R Molleker	7	6^{3}	6
10	(Italy) S Travaglia	7^{7}	6
(Brazil) R Dutra Silva	6^{3}	3
Q	(Sweden) E Ymer	7^{8}	6
7	(France) G Barrère	6^{6}	1

Third round
1	(Uruguay) P Cuevas	6	6
14	(Germany) R Molleker	2	2
10	(Italy) S Travaglia	5	4
Q	(Sweden) E Ymer	7	6

Quarterfinals
1	(Uruguay) P Cuevas	7^{7}	4	6
Q	(Sweden) E Ymer	6^{1}	6	3

==== Section 2 ====
First round
(Croatia) N Serdarušić	6^{2}	5
WC	(France) Antoine Cornut-Chauvinc	7^{7}	7
(France) K de Schepper	5	6	1
(Germany) D Masur	7	4	6
(France) C Hemery	6	6^{5}	0^{r}
Alt	(Monaco) H Nys	3	7^{7}	2
(El Salvador) M Arévalo	7	6
(France) J Tatlot	5	2

Second round
3/WC	(South Africa) L Harris	7	6
WC	(France) A Cornut-Chauvinc	5	3
(Germany) D Masur	6	6
LL	(France) Jonathan Kanar	2	3
9	(Canada) P Polansky	6^{7}	4
Alt	(Monaco) H Nys	7^{9}	6
(El Salvador) M Arévalo	6^{5}	4
5/WC	(Brazil) T Monteiro	7^{7}	6

Third round
3/WC	(South Africa) L Harris	4	3
(Germany) D Masur	6	6
Alt	(Monaco) H Nys	5	6	7^{7}
5/WC	(Brazil) T Monteiro	7	3	6^{5}

Quarterfinals
(Germany) D Masur	6	5	5
Alt	(Monaco) H Nys	4	7	7

=== Bottom half ===
==== Section 3 ====
First round
(Germany) K Krawietz	6	0	5
(Russia) A Vatutin	3	6	7
WC	(France) H Gaston	6	7^{7}
Q	(France) D Added	1	6^{3}
(Serbia) V Troicki	6	6
(Belgium) Y Mertens	3	1
(Germany) B Hassan	6	6
(Spain) D Gimeno Traver	3	3

Second round
6	(Germany) Y Maden	6	5	2
(Russia) A Vatutin	3	7	6
WC	(France) H Gaston	2	1
11	(France) A Hoang	6	6
16	(Italy) L Giustino	6	2	4
(Serbia) V Troicki	4	6	6
(Germany) B Hassan	6	6
4	(Uzbekistan) D Istomin	4	2

Third round
(Russia) A Vatutin	6^{6}	6	6
11	(France) A Hoang	7^{8}	3	1
(Serbia) V Troicki	2	2
(Germany) B Hassan	6	6

Quarterfinals
(Russia) A Vatutin	7	7^{7}
(Germany) B Hassan	5	6^{3}

==== Section 4 ====
First round
(Germany) T Pütz	7^{10}	0	2
(France) E Couacaud	6^{8}	6	6
(United Kingdom) J Ward	7^{8}	7^{7}
(France) T Lamasine	6^{6}	6^{4}
(France) A Olivetti	2	1
(Czech Republic) J Šátral	6	6
(France) E Benchetrit	7^{7}	0	4
(France) Q Halys	6^{5}	6	6

Second round
8	(Spain) G García López	6^{5}	4
(France) E Couacaud	7^{7}	6
(United Kingdom) J Ward	6^{4}	2
12	(Italy) G Mager	7^{7}	6
13	(United States) M Giron	3	6	4
(Czech Republic) J Šátral	6	2	6
(France) Q Halys	6	7^{7}
2	(Czech Republic) J Veselý	4	6^{1}

Third round
(France) E Couacaud	5	6^{5}
12	(Italy) G Mager	7	7^{7}
(Czech Republic) J Šátral	3	4
(France) Q Halys	6	6

Quarterfinals
12	(Italy) G Mager	7^{7}	4	4
(France) Q Halys	6^{5}	6	6
