= 2019 Open du Pays d'Aix =

- Date: 6–12 May
- Edition: 6th
- Draw: 48S / 16D
- Prize money: €137,560+H
- Surface: Clay
- Location: Aix-en-Provence, France

Champions

Singles
- (Uruguay) Pablo Cuevas

Doubles
- (Germany) Kevin Krawietz / (Austria) Jürgen Melzer
← 2018 ·	Open du Pays d'Aix	· 2020 →

The 2019 Open du Pays d'Aix was a professional tennis tournament played on clay courts. It was the sixth edition of the tournament which was part of the 2019 ATP Challenger Tour. It took place in Aix-en-Provence, France between 6 and 12 May 2019.

== Singles main-draw entrants ==
=== Seeds ===
Country	Player	Rank^{1}	Seed
URU	Pablo Cuevas	67	1
CZE	Jiří Veselý	91	2
RSA	Lloyd Harris	94	3
UZB	Denis Istomin	106	4
BRA	Thiago Monteiro	111	5
GER	Yannick Maden	114	6
FRA	Grégoire Barrère	117	7
ESP	Guillermo García López	124	8
CAN	Peter Polansky	125	9
ITA	Stefano Travaglia	128	10
FRA	Antoine Hoang	145	11
ITA	Gianluca Mager	147	12
USA	Marcos Giron	154	13
GER	Rudolf Molleker	157	14
~~ITA~~	~~Simone Bolelli~~	~~160~~	~~15~~
ITA	Lorenzo Giustino	161	16

- ^{1} Rankings as of 29 April 2019.

=== Other entrants ===
The following players received wildcards into the singles main draw:

- (France) Antoine Cornut-Chauvinc
- (France) Hugo Gaston
- (South Africa) Lloyd Harris
- (France) Matteo Martineau
- (Brazil) Thiago Monteiro

The following player received entry into the singles main draw as an alternate:

- (Monaco) Hugo Nys

The following players received entry from the qualifying draw:

- (France) Dan Added
- (Sweden) Elias Ymer

The following players received entry as lucky losers:

- (France) Jonathan Kanar
- (Austria) Jürgen Melzer

== Champions ==
=== Singles ===
- (Uruguay) Pablo Cuevas def. (France) Quentin Halys 7–5, 3–6, 6–2.

=== Doubles ===
- (Germany) Kevin Krawietz / (Austria) Jürgen Melzer def. (Denmark) Frederik Nielsen / (Germany) Tim Pütz 7–6^{(7–5)}, 6–2.
