= 2022 Open du Pays d'Aix – Singles =

Singles
- 2022 Open du Pays d'Aix

Final
- Champion: (France) Benjamin Bonzi
- Runner-up: (France) Grégoire Barrère
- Score: 6–2, 6–4

Events
Singles	Doubles
← 2021 ·	Open du Pays d'Aix	· 2023 →

Carlos Taberner was the defending champion but chose not to defend his title.

Benjamin Bonzi won the title after defeating countryman Grégoire Barrère 6–2, 6–4 in the final.

== Seeds ==
1. (France) Benjamin Bonzi (champion)
2. (Germany) Daniel Altmaier (second round)
3. (France) Richard Gasquet (second round)
4. (France) Quentin Halys (quarterfinals)
5. (Uruguay) Pablo Cuevas (second round)
6. (Peru) Juan Pablo Varillas (second round)
7. (Spain) Fernando Verdasco (first round, retired)
8. (France) Corentin Moutet (second round)

== Draw ==
=== Key ===
- Q = Qualifier
- WC = Wild card
- LL = Lucky loser
- Alt = Alternate
- SE = Special exempt
- PR = Protected ranking
- ITF = ITF entry
- JE = Junior exempt
- w/o = Walkover
- r = Retired
- d = Defaulted
- SR = Special ranking

=== Finals ===
Semifinals
1	(France) Benjamin Bonzi	6^{8}	7^{7}	7^{7}
(Chile) Nicolás Jarry	7^{10}	6^{2}	6^{5}
Alt	(France) Grégoire Barrère	6	4	7
Pavel Kotov	3	6	5

Final
1	(France) Benjamin Bonzi	6	6
Alt	(France) Grégoire Barrère	2	4

=== Top half ===
First round
1	(France) B Bonzi	7	6
Q	(France) G Debru	5	3
(Switzerland) D Stricker	6	1	5
Q	(France) K Jacquet	4	6	7
WC	(France) T Droguet	1	6^{2}
(Italy) S Caruso	6	7^{7}
(India) R Ramanathan	6	1
7	(Spain) F Verdasco	4	0^{r}
3	(France) R Gasquet	6	7^{7}
(France) M Guinard	4	6^{2}
Q	(France) M Bourgue	3	5
(France) A Müller	6	7
(Portugal) G Elias	3	6^{4}
(Chile) N Jarry	6	7^{7}
(United Kingdom) L Broady	4	2
8	(France) C Moutet	6	6

Second round
1	(France) B Bonzi	7^{9}	6
Q	(France) K Jacquet	6^{7}	3
(Italy) S Caruso	4	6	5
(India) R Ramanathan	6	3	7
3	(France) R Gasquet	2	4
(France) A Müller	6	6
(Chile) N Jarry	7	6
8	(France) C Moutet	5	1

Quarterfinals
1	(France) B Bonzi	6	3	6
(India) R Ramanathan	2	6	0
(France) A Müller	5	4
(Chile) N Jarry	7	6

Semifinals
1	(France) B Bonzi	6^{8}	7^{7}	7^{7}
(Chile) N Jarry	7^{10}	6^{2}	6^{5}

=== Bottom half ===
First round
6	(Peru) JP Varillas	6	3	6
(Italy) A Pellegrino	2	6	3
Alt	(France) G Barrère	6	4	7
WC	(France) J-W Tsonga	3	6	5
Q	(France) C Hemery	6	6
WC	(France) S Gueymard Wayenburg	4	2
Alt	(France) A Hoang	5	3
4	(France) Q Halys	7	6
5	(Uruguay) P Cuevas	6	3	7
Q	(Australia) A Popyrin	2	6	5
P Kotov	3	6	6
(France) C Lestienne	6	4	1
(France) A Escoffier	2	6^{5}
(France) H Grenier	6	7^{7}
Q	(Uruguay) M Cuevas	3	4
2	(Germany) D Altmaier	6	6

Second round
6	(Peru) JP Varillas	4	6	4
Alt	(France) G Barrère	6	4	6
Q	(France) C Hemery	6	4	3
4	(France) Q Halys	2	6	6
5	(Uruguay) P Cuevas	6	3	2
P Kotov	4	6	6
(France) H Grenier	6	6
2	(Germany) D Altmaier	1	3

Quarterfinals
Alt	(France) G Barrère	6	7^{8}
4	(France) Q Halys	3	6^{6}
P Kotov	7	7^{8}
(France) H Grenier	5	6^{6}

Semifinals
Alt	(France) G Barrère	6	4	7
P Kotov	3	6	5
