= 2018 Open du Pays d'Aix – Singles =

Singles
- 2018 Open du Pays d'Aix

Final
- Champion: (Australia) John Millman
- Runner-up: (Australia) Bernard Tomic
- Score: 6–1, 6–2

Events
Singles	Doubles
← 2017 ·	Open du Pays d'Aix	· 2019 →

Frances Tiafoe was the defending champion but chose not to defend his title.

John Millman won the title after defeating Bernard Tomic 6–1, 6–2 in the final.

== Seeds ==
1. (Australia) John Millman (champion)
2. (France) Jérémy Chardy (first round)
3. (Moldova) Radu Albot (first round)
4. (United Kingdom) Cameron Norrie (second round)
5. (France) Calvin Hemery (first round)
6. (Canada) Peter Polansky (first round)
7. (Ukraine) Sergiy Stakhovsky (first round)
8. (Brazil) Thiago Monteiro (quarterfinals)

== Draw ==
=== Key ===
- Q = Qualifier
- WC = Wild card
- LL = Lucky loser
- Alt = Alternate
- ITF = ITF entry
- PR = Protected ranking
- SR = Special ranking
- SE = Special exempt
- JE = Junior exempt
- JR = Junior Accelerator Programme entrant
- CO = College Accelerator Programme entrant
- NG = Next Gen Accelerator Program entrant
- w/o = Walkover
- r = Retired
- d = Defaulted

=== Finals ===
Semifinals
1	(Australia) John Millman	6^{9}	6	7
(Argentina) Guido Andreozzi	7^{11}	2	5
(Sweden) Elias Ymer	6	6^{2}	4
(Australia) Bernard Tomic	2	7^{7}	6

Final
1	(Australia) John Millman	6	6
(Australia) Bernard Tomic	1	2

=== Top half ===
First round
1	(Australia) J Millman	6	5	6
Q	(Australia) A Popyrin	2	7	2
(United States) S Kozlov	6^{2}	4
(France) C Lestienne	7^{7}	6
(Germany) O Otte	2	6	6
Q	(Canada) S Diez	6	2	3
(Austria) S Ofner	3	6	7
7	(Ukraine) S Stakhovsky	6	2	5
3	(Moldova) R Albot	6	3	4
(Argentina) G Andreozzi	3	6	6
WC	(France) A Müller	2	2
Q	(Argentina) M González	6	6
(Kazakhstan) A Bublik	6^{5}	6^{4}
(United States) B Klahn	7^{7}	7^{7}
(Germany) M Moraing	2	3
8	(Brazil) T Monteiro	6	6

Second round
1	(Australia) J Millman	6	6
(France) C Lestienne	2	2
(Germany) O Otte	4	6	6
(Austria) S Ofner	6	3	2
(Argentina) G Andreozzi	6	6
Q	(Argentina) M González	1	2
(United States) B Klahn	5	4
8	(Brazil) T Monteiro	7	6

Quarterfinals
1	(Australia) J Millman	6	6
(Germany) O Otte	4	0
(Argentina) G Andreozzi	7^{9}	7^{7}
8	(Brazil) T Monteiro	6^{7}	6^{2}

Semifinals
1	(Australia) J Millman	6^{9}	6	7
(Argentina) G Andreozzi	7^{11}	2	5

=== Bottom half ===
First round
5	(France) C Hemery	6^{2}	2
SE	(Croatia) N Serdarušić	7^{7}	6
(Slovakia) N Gombos	6	7^{7}
(Spain) T Robredo	2	6^{4}
(France) B Bonzi	4	2
(Sweden) E Ymer	6	6
(France) K de Schepper	6	2	1
4	(United Kingdom) C Norrie	1	6	6
6	(Canada) P Polansky	5	7	3
WC	(France) J Tatlot	7	5	6
(Australia) B Tomic	6	2	7
WC	(France) G Blancaneaux	4	6	5
Q	(Italy) G Mager	7	7^{9}
(Latvia) E Gulbis	5	6^{7}
WC	(France) E Benchetrit	6	6
2	(France) J Chardy	3	2

Second round
SE	(Croatia) N Serdarušić	6	6
(Slovakia) N Gombos	4	4
(Sweden) E Ymer	2	6	7
4	(United Kingdom) C Norrie	6	3	5
WC	(France) J Tatlot	4	1
(Australia) B Tomic	6	6
Q	(Italy) G Mager	6	3	6
WC	(France) E Benchetrit	4	6	1

Quarterfinals
SE	(Croatia) N Serdarušić	5	3
(Sweden) E Ymer	7	6
(Australia) B Tomic	6	6
Q	(Italy) G Mager	3	4

Semifinals
(Sweden) E Ymer	6	6^{2}	4
(Australia) B Tomic	2	7^{7}	6
