= 2017 Open du Pays d'Aix – Doubles =

2017 ATP Challenger Tour

Doubles
- 2017 Open du Pays d'Aix

Final
- Champions: (Netherlands) Wesley Koolhof (Netherlands) Matwé Middelkoop
- Runners-up: (Germany) Andre Begemann (France) Jérémy Chardy
- Score: 2–6, 6–4, [16–14]

Events
Singles	Doubles
← 2016 ·	Open du Pays d'Aix	· 2018 →

Oliver Marach and Philipp Oswald were the defending champions but chose not to defend their title.

Wesley Koolhof and Matwé Middelkoop won the title after defeating Andre Begemann and Jérémy Chardy 2–6, 6–4, [16–14] in the final.

== Seeds ==
1. (New Zealand) Marcus Daniell / (Brazil) Marcelo Demoliner (semifinals)
2. (Netherlands) Wesley Koolhof / (Netherlands) Matwé Middelkoop (champions)
3. (France) Julien Benneteau / (France) Jonathan Eysseric (quarterfinals)
4. (Australia) John-Patrick Smith / (New Zealand) Michael Venus (first round)

== Draw ==
=== Key ===
- Q = Qualifier
- WC = Wild card
- LL = Lucky loser
- Alt = Alternate
- SE = Special exempt
- PR = Protected ranking
- ITF = ITF entry
- JE = Junior exempt
- w/o = Walkover
- r = Retired
- d = Defaulted
- SR = Special ranking

First round
1	(New Zealand) M Daniell (Brazil) M Demoliner	3	6	[11]
(Israel) J Erlich (United States) S Lipsky	6	3	[9]
(Mexico) S González (New Zealand) A Sitak	7^{7}	4	[10]
WC	(France) Q Halys (France) H Nys	6^{2}	6	[6]
4	(Australia) J-P Smith (New Zealand) M Venus	2	6	[10]
(Peru) S Galdós (Argentina) R Olivo	6	3	[12]
WC	(France) K de Schepper (France) A Michon	2	3
(Germany) A Begemann (France) J Chardy	6	6
(Argentina) G Durán (Argentina) A Molteni	7	7^{9}
(Croatia) D Marcan (Austria) T-S Weissborn	5	6^{7}
(Uruguay) A Behar (Belarus) A Bury	6^{2}	2
3	(France) J Benneteau (France) J Eysseric	7^{7}	6
(Austria) J Knowle (Austria) J Melzer	6	7
(United States) J Cerretani (Australia) M Reid	3	5
WC	(France) M Chazal (France) Louis Tessa	2	1
2	(Netherlands) W Koolhof (Netherlands) M Middelkoop	6	6

Quarterfinals
1	(New Zealand) M Daniell (Brazil) M Demoliner	6	6
(Mexico) S González (New Zealand) A Sitak	2	4
(Peru) S Galdós (Argentina) R Olivo	0	3
(Germany) A Begemann (France) J Chardy	6	6
(Argentina) G Durán (Argentina) A Molteni	6	7^{7}
3	(France) J Benneteau (France) J Eysseric	1	6^{2}
(Austria) J Knowle (Austria) J Melzer
2	(Netherlands) W Koolhof (Netherlands) M Middelkoop	w/o

Semifinals
1	(New Zealand) M Daniell (Brazil) M Demoliner	2	5
(Germany) A Begemann (France) J Chardy	6	7
(Argentina) G Durán (Argentina) A Molteni	6	4	[5]
2	(Netherlands) W Koolhof (Netherlands) M Middelkoop	4	6	[10]

Final
(Germany) A Begemann (France) J Chardy	6	4	[14]
2	(Netherlands) W Koolhof (Netherlands) M Middelkoop	2	6	[16]
