= 2017 Open du Pays d'Aix – Singles =

Singles
- 2017 Open du Pays d'Aix

Final
- Champion: (United States) Frances Tiafoe
- Runner-up: (France) Jérémy Chardy
- Score: 6–3, 4–6, 7–6^{(7–5)}

Events
Singles	Doubles
← 2016 ·	Open du Pays d'Aix	· 2018 →

Thiago Monteiro was the defending champion but chose not to defend his title.

Frances Tiafoe won the title after defeating Jérémy Chardy 6–3, 4–6, 7–6^{(7–5)} in the final.

== Seeds ==
1. (Tunisia) Malek Jaziri (quarterfinals)
2. (Brazil) Rogério Dutra Silva (second round)
3. (France) Jérémy Chardy (final)
4. (United States) Frances Tiafoe (champion)
5. (Serbia) Dušan Lajović (first round)
6. (Argentina) Renzo Olivo (first round)
7. (Slovakia) Norbert Gombos (second round)
8. (France) Julien Benneteau (quarterfinals)

== Draw ==
=== Key ===
- Q = Qualifier
- WC = Wild card
- LL = Lucky loser
- Alt = Alternate
- SE = Special exempt
- PR = Protected ranking
- ITF = ITF entry
- JE = Junior exempt
- w/o = Walkover
- r = Retired
- d = Defaulted
- SR = Special ranking

=== Finals ===
Semifinals
(United States) Reilly Opelka	4	3
4	(United States) Frances Tiafoe	6	6
3	(France) Jérémy Chardy	6	6
Alt	(Portugal) Pedro Sousa	4	1

Final
4	(United States) Frances Tiafoe	6	4	7^{7}
3	(France) Jérémy Chardy	3	6	6^{5}

=== Top half ===
First round
1	(Tunisia) M Jaziri	6	5	6
(France) C Lestienne	4	7	4
LL	(France) Louis Tessa	0	6^{5}
(Russia) A Rublev	6	7^{7}
(Sweden) E Ymer	6	6
Q	(France) E Benchetrit	4	2
(United States) R Opelka	3	6	6
5	(Serbia) D Lajović	6	4	2
4	(United States) F Tiafoe	6	6^{2}	7
(Belgium) A De Greef	2	7^{7}	5
Q	(France) M Hamou	6	6
WC	(France) C Moutet	3	4
(United States) D Kudla	3	2
(France) Q Halys	6	6
LL	(Belgium) Clément Geens	6	5	6
6	(Argentina) R Olivo	3	7	3

Second round
1	(Tunisia) M Jaziri	7	6
(Russia) A Rublev	5	3
(Sweden) E Ymer	6^{3}	6^{8}
(United States) R Opelka	7^{7}	7^{10}
4	(United States) F Tiafoe	6	6
Q	(France) M Hamou	4	3
(France) Q Halys	7^{7}	2	6
LL	(Belgium) C Geens	6^{3}	6	4

Quarterfinals
1	(Tunisia) M Jaziri	3	4
(United States) R Opelka	6	6
4	(United States) F Tiafoe	6	7^{7}
(France) Q Halys	3	6^{2}

Semifinals
(United States) R Opelka	4	3
4	(United States) F Tiafoe	6	6

=== Bottom half ===
First round
7	(Slovakia) N Gombos	4	6	6
(France) K de Schepper	6	4	4
(United States) B Fratangelo	7	6
Q	(Argentina) A Molteni	5	4
LL	(France) A Michon	6^{3}	6^{3}
(Czech Republic) L Rosol	7^{7}	7^{7}
(Chile) C Garin	5	6	2
3	(France) J Chardy	7	4	6
8	(France) J Benneteau	3	6	6
SE	(United States) T Paul	6	2	4
(Austria) J Melzer	6	6
WC	(France) M Janvier	3	4
Alt	(Portugal) P Sousa	6	5	6
Q	(Sweden) M Ymer	1	7	1
WC	(France) A Müller	6^{4}	2
2	(Brazil) R Dutra Silva	7^{7}	6

Second round
7	(Slovakia) N Gombos	6^{5}	6^{2}
(United States) B Fratangelo	7^{7}	7^{7}
(Czech Republic) L Rosol	1	3
3	(France) J Chardy	6	6
8	(France) J Benneteau	3	6	3
(Austria) J Melzer	6	4	0^{r}
Alt	(Portugal) P Sousa	6	6^{2}	7^{7}
2	(Brazil) R Dutra Silva	3	7^{7}	6^{5}

Quarterfinals
(United States) B Fratangelo	3	2
3	(France) J Chardy	6	6
8	(France) J Benneteau	3	5
Alt	(Portugal) P Sousa	6	7

Semifinals
3	(France) J Chardy	6	6
Alt	(Portugal) P Sousa	4	1
