= 2021 Open du Pays d'Aix =

- Date: 14–20 June
- Edition: 8th
- Draw: 32S / 16D
- Surface: Clay
- Location: Aix-en-Provence, France

Champions

Singles
- (Spain) Carlos Taberner

Doubles
- (France) Sadio Doumbia / (France) Fabien Reboul
← 2020 ·	Open du Pays d'Aix	· 2022 →

The 2021 Open du Pays d'Aix was a professional tennis tournament played on clay courts. It was the eighth edition of the tournament which was part of the 2021 ATP Challenger Tour. It took place in Aix-en-Provence, France between 14 and 20 June 2021.

== Singles main-draw entrants ==
=== Seeds ===
Country	Player	Rank^{1}	Seed
ESP	Roberto Carballés Baena	95	1
ESP	Fernando Verdasco	99	2
ARG	Facundo Bagnis	104	3
ARG	Francisco Cerúndolo	117	4
PER	Juan Pablo Varillas	130	5
ESP	Carlos Taberner	137	6
FRA	Hugo Gaston	141	7
IND	Sumit Nagal	143	8

- ^{1} Rankings as of 31 May 2021.

=== Other entrants ===
The following players received wildcards into the singles main draw:

- (France) Arthur Cazaux
- (France) Kyrian Jacquet
- (France) Matteo Martineau

The following players received entry into the singles main draw as alternates:

- (Spain) Javier Barranco Cosano
- (France) Geoffrey Blancaneaux
- (Argentina) Agustín Velotti

The following players received entry from the qualifying draw:

- (Tunisia) Aziz Dougaz
- (France) Titouan Droguet
- (Spain) Oriol Roca Batalla
- (Spain) Nikolás Sánchez Izquierdo

The following player received entry as a lucky loser:

- (Brazil) Oscar José Gutierrez

== Champions ==
=== Singles ===
- (Spain) Carlos Taberner def. (France) Manuel Guinard 6–2, 6–2.

=== Doubles ===
- (France) Sadio Doumbia / (France) Fabien Reboul def. (United States) Robert Galloway / (United States) Alex Lawson 6–7^{(4–7)}, 7–5, [10–4].
