= 2023 Open Aix Provence – Doubles =

Doubles
- 2023 Open Aix Provence

Final
- Champions: (Australia) Jason Kubler (Australia) John Peers
- Runners-up: (Portugal) Nuno Borges (Portugal) Francisco Cabral
- Score: 6–7^{(5–7)}, 6–4, [10–7]

Events
Singles	Doubles
← 2022 ·	Open Aix Provence	· 2024 →

Titouan Droguet and Kyrian Jacquet were the defending champions but chose not to defend their title.

Jason Kubler and John Peers won the title after defeating Nuno Borges and Francisco Cabral 6–7^{(5–7)}, 6–4, [10–7] in the final.

== Seeds ==
1. (Spain) Marcel Granollers / (Argentina) Horacio Zeballos (quarterfinals)
2. (Monaco) Hugo Nys / (Poland) Jan Zieliński (quarterfinals)
3. (Netherlands) Matwé Middelkoop / (Germany) Andreas Mies (first round)
4. (Australia) Jason Kubler / (Australia) John Peers (champions)

== Draw ==
=== Key ===
- Q = Qualifier
- WC = Wild card
- LL = Lucky loser
- Alt = Alternate
- SE = Special exempt
- PR = Protected ranking
- ITF = ITF entry
- JE = Junior exempt
- w/o = Walkover
- r = Retired
- d = Defaulted
- SR = Special ranking

First round
1	(Spain) M Granollers (Argentina) H Zeballos	6	6
WC	(France) A Mannarino (France) H Mayot	3	4
(Netherlands) R Haase (Austria) P Oswald	7	4	[13]
(Romania) VV Cornea (Netherlands) D Pel	5	6	[11]
4	(Australia) J Kubler (Australia) J Peers	2	6	[13]
(France) S Doumbia (France) F Reboul	6	2	[11]
(France) D Added (France) N Mahut	2	6	[10]
(France) J Eysseric (Pakistan) A-u-H Qureshi	6	4	[5]
(Portugal) N Borges (Portugal) F Cabral	6	7
WC	(France) A Cazaux (France) A Müller	2	5
(United States) R Galloway (Mexico) MÁ Reyes-Varela	6	6
3	(Netherlands) M Middelkoop (Germany) A Mies	4	3
(Belgium) S Gillé (Belgium) J Vliegen	7	4	[10]
(France) A Olivetti (Spain) D Vega Hernández	5	6	[7]
(Monaco) R Arneodo (Austria) S Weissborn	5	5
2	(Monaco) H Nys (Poland) J Zieliński	7	7

Quarterfinals
1	(Spain) M Granollers (Argentina) H Zeballos	3	6	[7]
(Netherlands) R Haase (Austria) P Oswald	6	4	[10]
4	(Australia) J Kubler (Australia) J Peers	7	2	[10]
(France) D Added (France) N Mahut	5	6	[8]
(Portugal) N Borges (Portugal) F Cabral	7^{7}	6
(United States) R Galloway (Mexico) MÁ Reyes-Varela	6^{4}	3
(Belgium) S Gillé (Belgium) J Vliegen	6	6
2	(Monaco) H Nys (Poland) J Zieliński	4	4

Semifinals
(Netherlands) R Haase (Austria) P Oswald	2	1
4	(Australia) J Kubler (Australia) J Peers	6	6
(Portugal) N Borges (Portugal) F Cabral	7^{7}	6
(Belgium) S Gillé (Belgium) J Vliegen	6^{4}	2

Final
4	(Australia) J Kubler (Australia) J Peers	6^{5}	6	[10]
(Portugal) N Borges (Portugal) F Cabral	7^{7}	4	[7]
