= 2016 Open du Pays d'Aix – Singles =

Singles
- 2016 Open du Pays d'Aix

Final
- Champion: (Brazil) Thiago Monteiro
- Runner-up: (Argentina) Carlos Berlocq
- Score: 4–6, 6–4, 6–1

Events
| Singles | Doubles |
| ← 2015 · | Open du Pays d'Aix | · 2017 → |

Robin Haase was the defending champion but chose not to participate.

Thiago Monteiro won the title, defeating Carlos Berlocq 4–6, 6–4, 6–1 in the final.

== Seeds ==
1. (Czech Republic) Lukáš Rosol (quarterfinals)
2. (Argentina) Diego Schwartzman (withdrew)
3. (Brazil) Rogério Dutra Silva (quarterfinals)
4. (France) Stéphane Robert (first round)
5. (Germany) Mischa Zverev (second round)
6. (Sweden) Elias Ymer (semifinals)
7. (Germany) Daniel Brands (first round)
8. (Argentina) Máximo González (first round)

== Draw ==
=== Key ===
- Q = Qualifier
- WC = Wild card
- LL = Lucky loser
- Alt = Alternate
- SE = Special exempt
- PR = Protected ranking
- ITF = ITF entry
- JE = Junior exempt
- w/o = Walkover
- r = Retired
- d = Defaulted
- SR = Special ranking

=== Finals ===
Semifinals
6 | (Sweden) Elias Ymer | 2 | 7^{7} | 0
(Argentina) Carlos Berlocq | 6 | 6^{5} | 6
(Argentina) Renzo Olivo | 3 | 3
(Brazil) Thiago Monteiro | 6 | 6

Final
(Argentina) Carlos Berlocq | 6 | 4 | 1
(Brazil) Thiago Monteiro | 4 | 6 | 6

=== Top half ===
First round
1 | (Czech Republic) L Rosol | 6 | 6
Q | (Switzerland) Y Marti | 3 | 4
Q | (Croatia) N Mektić | 7 | 6
(Brazil) J Souza | 5 | 3
(Colombia) A González | 6 | 6
(France) M Bourgue | 4 | 3
SE | (France) C Lestienne | 4 | 6 | 1
6 | (Sweden) E Ymer | 6 | 1 | 6
3 | (Brazil) R Dutra Silva | 6 | 6
(Germany) P Gojowczyk | 4 | 2
(Kazakhstan) A Golubev | 3 | 4
WC | (France) C Hemery | 6 | 6
Q | (Belgium) Y Reuter | 3 | 4
(Argentina) C Berlocq | 6 | 6
WC | (France) M Chazal | 0 | 3
5 | (Germany) M Zverev | 6 | 6

Second round
1 | (Czech Republic) L Rosol | 6 | 6
Q | (Croatia) N Mektić | 4 | 4
(Colombia) A González | 4 | 4
6 | (Sweden) E Ymer | 6 | 6
3 | (Brazil) R Dutra Silva | 6 | 6
WC | (France) C Hemery | 2 | 1
(Argentina) C Berlocq | 6 | 6
5 | (Germany) M Zverev | 4 | 3

Quarterfinals
1 | (Czech Republic) L Rosol | 6^{6} | 2
6 | (Sweden) E Ymer | 7^{7} | 6
3 | (Brazil) R Dutra Silva | 6 | 2 | 4
(Argentina) C Berlocq | 2 | 6 | 6

Semifinals
6 | (Sweden) E Ymer | 2 | 7^{7} | 0
(Argentina) C Berlocq | 6 | 6^{5} | 6

=== Bottom half ===
First round
7 | (Germany) D Brands | 5 | 7^{7} | 1
(Argentina) R Olivo | 7 | 6^{5} | 6
(Brazil) A Ghem | 6 | 3 | 7
WC | (France) G Barrère | 4 | 6 | 5
(France) É Roger-Vasselin | 2 | 6 | 6
(Belgium) K Coppejans | 6 | 4 | 3
(France) T Lamasine | 7^{7} | 3 | 6
4 | (France) S Robert | 6^{5} | 6 | 3
8 | (Argentina) M González | 3 | 1
SE | (Czech Republic) M Michalička | 6 | 6
(Slovakia) J Kovalík | 7^{7} | 6
Q | (France) M Vaïsse | 6^{5} | 3
PR | (France) A Olivetti | 2 | 2
WC | (France) J Benneteau | 6 | 6
(Brazil) T Monteiro | 6 | 6
LL | (France) D Guez | 1 | 3

Second round
(Argentina) R Olivo | 6 | 6
(Brazil) A Ghem | 1 | 2
(France) É Roger-Vasselin | 3 | 4
(France) T Lamasine | 6 | 6
SE | (Czech Republic) M Michalička | 6 | 6
(Slovakia) J Kovalík | 4 | 3
WC | (France) J Benneteau | 4 | 7^{7} | 6^{5}
(Brazil) T Monteiro | 6 | 6^{5} | 7^{7}

Quarterfinals
(Argentina) R Olivo | 6 | 6^{2} | 6
(France) T Lamasine | 4 | 7^{7} | 1
SE | (Czech Republic) M Michalička | 2 | 1
(Brazil) T Monteiro | 6 | 6

Semifinals
(Argentina) R Olivo | 3 | 3
(Brazil) T Monteiro | 6 | 6
