= 2023 Open Aix Provence – Singles =

Singles
- 2023 Open Aix Provence

Final
- Champion: (United Kingdom) Andy Murray
- Runner-up: (United States) Tommy Paul
- Score: 2–6, 6–1, 6–2

Events
Singles	Doubles
← 2022 ·	Open Aix Provence	· 2024 →

Benjamin Bonzi was the defending champion but chose not to defend his title.

Andy Murray won the title after defeating Tommy Paul 2–6, 6–1, 6–2 in the final.

== Seeds ==
The top four seeds received a bye into the second round.

1. (United States) Tommy Paul (final)
2. (United States) Brandon Nakashima (second round)
3. (France) Adrian Mannarino (second round)
4. (Sweden) Mikael Ymer (withdrew)
5. (United Kingdom) Andy Murray (champion)
6. (Kazakhstan) Alexander Bublik (quarterfinals)
7. (France) Grégoire Barrère (first round)
8. (Argentina) Tomás Martín Etcheverry (second round)

== Draw ==
=== Key ===
- Q = Qualifier
- WC = Wild card
- LL = Lucky loser
- Alt = Alternate
- SE = Special exempt
- PR = Protected ranking
- ITF = ITF entry
- JE = Junior exempt
- w/o = Walkover
- r = Retired
- d = Defaulted
- SR = Special ranking

=== Finals ===
Semifinals
1/WC	(United States) Tommy Paul	6	6
(Belgium) David Goffin	4	2
5/WC	(United Kingdom) Andy Murray	7	6
LL	(France) Harold Mayot	5	1

Final
1/WC	(United States) Tommy Paul	6	1	2
5/WC	(United Kingdom) Andy Murray	2	6	6

=== Top half ===
First round
Alt	(France) G Blancaneaux	6	6
Q	I Gakhov	3	2
(Austria) J Rodionov	1	6	6
Q	(France) A Cazaux	6	1	4
Q	(Serbia) H Međedović	7	2	2
8	(Argentina) TM Etcheverry	5	6	6
Alt	(France) B Paire	6^{0}	1
(Belgium) D Goffin	7^{7}	6
Q	(Netherlands) R Haase	5	5
(France) Q Halys	7	7
(France) A Fils	4	7	7^{7}
7	(France) G Barrère	6	5	6^{4}

Second round
1/WC	(United States) T Paul	6	6
Alt	(France) G Blancaneaux	2	2
(Austria) J Rodionov	6	1	7^{7}
8	(Argentina) TM Etcheverry	3	6	6^{5}
LL	(France) D Added	4	6	2
(Belgium) D Goffin	6	3	6
(France) Q Halys	5	6	6^{2}
(France) A Fils	7	4	7^{7}

Quarterfinals
1/WC	(United States) T Paul	6	6
(Austria) J Rodionov	4	2
(Belgium) D Goffin	1	6	7^{8}
(France) A Fils	6	3	6^{6}

Semifinals
1/WC	(United States) T Paul	6	6
(Belgium) D Goffin	4	2

=== Bottom half ===
First round
5/WC	(United Kingdom) A Murray	6	6
WC	(France) G Monfils	3	2
Alt	(France) L Lokoli	3	6	7
(Spain) A Ramos Viñolas	6	4	5
(France) L Van Assche	6	6^{2}	6
Alt	(Portugal) J Sousa	4	7^{7}	1
6	(Kazakhstan) A Bublik	7^{7}	7
Alt	(Italy) R Bonadio	6^{5}	5
(Finland) O Virtanen	7^{7}	7^{9}
(France) A Müller	6^{4}	6^{7}
(Portugal) N Borges	5	4
LL	(France) H Mayot	7	6

Second round
5/WC	(United Kingdom) A Murray	6	5	6
Alt	(France) L Lokoli	4	7	3
(France) L Van Assche	3	6	6
3	(France) A Mannarino	6	3	2
6	(Kazakhstan) A Bublik	6	6
(Finland) O Virtanen	4	4
LL	(France) H Mayot	7^{7}	6
2	(United States) B Nakashima	6^{2}	3

Quarterfinals
5/WC	(United Kingdom) A Murray	6	7^{8}
(France) L Van Assche	2	6^{6}
6	(Kazakhstan) A Bublik	3	1
LL	(France) H Mayot	6	6

Semifinals
5/WC	(United Kingdom) A Murray	7	6
LL	(France) H Mayot	5	1
