= 2016 Open du Pays d'Aix – Doubles =

Doubles
- 2016 Open du Pays d'Aix

Final
- Champion: (Austria) Oliver Marach (Austria) Philipp Oswald
- Runner-up: (Argentina) Guillermo Durán (Argentina) Máximo González
- Score: 6–1, 4–6, [10–7]

Events
Singles	Doubles
← 2015 ·	Open du Pays d'Aix	· 2017 →

Robin Haase and Aisam-ul-Haq Qureshi were the defending champions but chose not to participate.

Oliver Marach and Philipp Oswald won the title, defeating Guillermo Durán and Máximo González 6–1, 4–6, [10–7] in the final.

== Seeds ==
1. (Argentina) Guillermo Durán / (Argentina) Máximo González (final)
2. (Netherlands) Wesley Koolhof / (Netherlands) Matwé Middelkoop (first round)
3. (Austria) Oliver Marach / (Austria) Philipp Oswald (champions)
4. (Germany) Gero Kretschmer / (New Zealand) Michael Venus (semifinals)

== Draw ==
=== Key ===
- Q = Qualifier
- WC = Wild card
- LL = Lucky loser
- Alt = Alternate
- SE = Special exempt
- PR = Protected ranking
- ITF = ITF entry
- JE = Junior exempt
- w/o = Walkover
- r = Retired
- d = Defaulted
- SR = Special ranking

First round
1	(Argentina) G Durán (Argentina) M González	6	6
(United States) N Monroe (Germany) M Zverev	2	2
(Poland) M Fyrstenberg (Czech Republic) L Rosol	5	6^{3}
(Sweden) J Brunström (Sweden) A Siljeström	7	7^{7}
4	(Germany) G Kretschmer (New Zealand) M Venus	7^{7}	2	[10]
(Argentina) C Berlocq (Sweden) E Ymer	6^{1}	6	[3]
(New Zealand) M Daniell (New Zealand) A Sitak	6	7^{7}
(Brazil) R Dutra Silva (Colombia) A González	1	6^{0}
PR	(Venezuela) R Maytín (Brazil) J Souza	2	0
WC	(France) J Benneteau (France) É Roger-Vasselin	6	6
WC	(France) J Eysseric (France) D Guez	0	3
3	(Austria) O Marach (Austria) P Oswald	6	6
PR	(France) T Lamasine (France) A Olivetti	3	6^{1}
(United Kingdom) J Marray (Canada) A Shamasdin	6	7^{7}
(Croatia) N Mektić (Croatia) A Šančić	6	6
2	(Netherlands) W Koolhof (Netherlands) M Middelkoop	4	1

Quarterfinals
1	(Argentina) G Durán (Argentina) M González	7	7^{7}
(Sweden) J Brunström (Sweden) A Siljeström	5	6^{4}
4	(Germany) G Kretschmer (New Zealand) M Venus	3	6	[10]
(New Zealand) M Daniell (New Zealand) A Sitak	6	1	[6]
WC	(France) J Benneteau (France) É Roger-Vasselin	6^{4}	4
3	(Austria) O Marach (Austria) P Oswald	7^{7}	6
(United Kingdom) J Marray (Canada) A Shamasdin	2	5
(Croatia) N Mektić (Croatia) A Šančić	6	7

Semifinals
1	(Argentina) G Durán (Argentina) M González	6	6
4	(Germany) G Kretschmer (New Zealand) M Venus	3	4
3	(Austria) O Marach (Austria) P Oswald	6	7^{7}
(Croatia) N Mektić (Croatia) A Šančić	3	6^{4}

Final
1	(Argentina) G Durán (Argentina) M González	1	6	[7]
3	(Austria) O Marach (Austria) P Oswald	6	4	[10]
