= 2022 Open du Pays d'Aix – Doubles =

Doubles
- 2022 Open du Pays d'Aix

Final
- Champions: (France) Titouan Droguet (France) Kyrian Jacquet
- Runners-up: (Colombia) Nicolás Barrientos (Mexico) Miguel Ángel Reyes-Varela
- Score: 6–2, 6–3

Events
Singles	Doubles
← 2021 ·	Open du Pays d'Aix	· 2023 →

Sadio Doumbia and Fabien Reboul were the defending champions but chose not to defend their title.

Titouan Droguet and Kyrian Jacquet won the title after defeating Nicolás Barrientos and Miguel Ángel Reyes-Varela 6–2, 6–3 in the final.

== Seeds ==
1. (United States) Austin Krajicek / (Monaco) Hugo Nys (quarterfinals)
2. (United Kingdom) Lloyd Glasspool / (Finland) Harri Heliövaara (quarterfinals)
3. (Brazil) Rafael Matos / (Spain) David Vega Hernández (quarterfinals)
4. (Sweden) André Göransson / (United States) Nathaniel Lammons (quarterfinals)

== Draw ==
=== Key ===
- Q = Qualifier
- WC = Wild card
- LL = Lucky loser
- Alt = Alternate
- SE = Special exempt
- PR = Protected ranking
- ITF = ITF entry
- JE = Junior exempt
- w/o = Walkover
- r = Retired
- d = Defaulted
- SR = Special ranking

First round
1	(United States) A Krajicek (Monaco) H Nys	6	4	[10]
(France) D Added (France) A Hoang	2	6	[6]
(France) G Barrère (France) C Lestienne	1	6^{3}
(India) Y Bhambri (India) R Ramanathan	6	7^{7}
3	(Brazil) R Matos (Spain) D Vega Hernández	6	6
(India) D Sharan (New Zealand) A Sitak	3	3
WC	(France) T Droguet (France) K Jacquet	7^{7}	6
(France) J Eysseric (France) Q Halys	6^{4}	4
(Colombia) N Barrientos (Mexico) MÁ Reyes-Varela	6	7^{7}
(Uruguay) M Cuevas (Uruguay) P Cuevas	3	6^{5}
(France) H Grenier (France) A Müller	1	4
4	(Sweden) A Göransson (United States) N Lammons	6	6
(Switzerland) L Margaroli (United States) M Schnur	5	6	[8]
WC	(France) S Gueymard Wayenburg (France) L Van Assche	7	2	[10]
(Monaco) R Arneodo (Poland) S Walków	4	7^{7}	[4]
2	(United Kingdom) L Glasspool (Finland) H Heliövaara	6	6^{5}	[10]

Quarterfinals
1	(United States) A Krajicek (Monaco) H Nys	3	6^{5}
(India) Y Bhambri (India) R Ramanathan	6	7^{7}
3	(Brazil) R Matos (Spain) D Vega Hernández	4	3
WC	(France) T Droguet (France) K Jacquet	6	6
(Colombia) N Barrientos (Mexico) MÁ Reyes-Varela	6	3	[12]
4	(Sweden) A Göransson (United States) N Lammons	2	6	[10]
WC	(France) S Gueymard Wayenburg (France) L Van Assche	6	3	[11]
2	(United Kingdom) L Glasspool (Finland) H Heliövaara	4	6	[9]

Semifinals
(India) Y Bhambri (India) R Ramanathan	5	6	[7]
WC	(France) T Droguet (France) K Jacquet	7	1	[10]
(Colombia) N Barrientos (Mexico) MÁ Reyes-Varela	6	6
WC	(France) S Gueymard Wayenburg (France) L Van Assche	0	2

Final
WC	(France) T Droguet (France) K Jacquet	6	6
(Colombia) N Barrientos (Mexico) MÁ Reyes-Varela	2	3
