= 2021 Open du Pays d'Aix – Singles =

Singles
- 2021 Open du Pays d'Aix

Final
- Champion: (Spain) Carlos Taberner
- Runner-up: (France) Manuel Guinard
- Score: 6–2, 6–2

Events
Singles	Doubles
← 2020 ·	Open du Pays d'Aix	· 2022 →

Oscar Otte was the defending champion but retired in the quarterfinals to Elias Ymer.

Carlos Taberner won the title after defeating Manuel Guinard 6–2, 6–2 in the final.

== Seeds ==
1. (Spain) Roberto Carballés Baena (second round)
2. (Spain) Fernando Verdasco (first round)
3. (Argentina) Facundo Bagnis (second round)
4. (Argentina) Francisco Cerúndolo (second round)
5. (Peru) Juan Pablo Varillas (second round)
6. (Spain) Carlos Taberner (champion)
7. (France) Hugo Gaston (second round)
8. (India) Sumit Nagal (first round)

== Draw ==
=== Key ===
- Q = Qualifier
- WC = Wild card
- LL = Lucky loser
- Alt = Alternate
- SE = Special exempt
- PR = Protected ranking
- ITF = ITF entry
- JE = Junior exempt
- w/o = Walkover
- r = Retired
- d = Defaulted
- SR = Special ranking

=== Finals ===
Semifinals
(France) Manuel Guinard	6	6
(Sweden) Elias Ymer	4	2
6	(Spain) Carlos Taberner	6	6^{7}	6
WC	(France) Kyrian Jacquet	3	7^{9}	0

Final
(France) Manuel Guinard	2	2
6	(Spain) Carlos Taberner	6	6

=== Top half ===
First round
1	(Spain) R Carballés Baena	6	6
WC	(France) M Martineau	3	1
Q	(Spain) N Sánchez Izquierdo	6	3	4
(France) M Guinard	3	6	6
(Portugal) J Domingues	6^{2}	4
(United States) B Fratangelo	7^{7}	6
(France) T Lamasine	4	7^{7}	6
8	(India) S Nagal	6	6^{5}	1
4	(Argentina) F Cerúndolo	6	4	6
Alt	(France) G Blancaneaux	2	6	4
(Sweden) E Ymer	6	7^{7}
(Italy) M Viola	4	6^{3}
(Germany) O Otte	6	6
Q	(Tunisia) A Dougaz	4	1
(Spain) T Robredo	6	1	0
7	(France) H Gaston	2	6	6

Second round
1	(Spain) R Carballés Baena	6^{5}	4
(France) M Guinard	7^{7}	6
(United States) B Fratangelo	5	3
(France) T Lamasine	7	6
4	(Argentina) F Cerúndolo	7^{9}	2	4
(Sweden) E Ymer	6^{7}	6	6
(Germany) O Otte	6	4	6
7	(France) H Gaston	4	6	3

Quarterfinals
(France) M Guinard	6^{4}	6	6
(France) T Lamasine	7^{7}	3	3
(Sweden) E Ymer	6	0
(Germany) O Otte	0	0^{r}

Semifinals
(France) M Guinard	6	6
(Sweden) E Ymer	4	2

=== Bottom half ===
First round
6	(Spain) C Taberner	6	6
(Russia) A Vatutin	4	1
WC	(France) A Cazaux	6	6
Alt	(Argentina) A Velotti	3	0
(Argentina) R Olivo	7^{7}	6
LL	(Brazil) Oscar José Gutierrez	6^{3}	4
Alt	(Spain) J Barranco Cosano	3	6	1
3	(Argentina) F Bagnis	6	1	6
5	(Peru) JP Varillas	6	6
(Argentina) A Collarini	4	4
(France) M Janvier	3	6^{2}
WC	(France) K Jacquet	6	7^{7}
Q	(France) T Droguet	6	6
Q	(Spain) O Roca Batalla	3	4
(France) M Bourgue	7^{7}	4	6
2	(Spain) F Verdasco	6^{3}	6	2

Second round
6	(Spain) C Taberner	7^{7}	6
WC	(France) A Cazaux	6^{5}	2
(Argentina) R Olivo	6	6
3	(Argentina) F Bagnis	2	4
5	(Peru) JP Varillas	4	3
WC	(France) K Jacquet	6	6
Q	(France) T Droguet	6	6
(France) M Bourgue	4	1

Quarterfinals
6	(Spain) C Taberner	6	6
(Argentina) R Olivo	3	1
WC	(France) K Jacquet	7	6
Q	(France) T Droguet	5	3

Semifinals
6	(Spain) C Taberner	6	6^{7}	6
WC	(France) K Jacquet	3	7^{9}	0
