= 2020 Open du Pays d'Aix – Singles =

Singles
- 2020 Open du Pays d'Aix

Final
- Champion: (Germany) Oscar Otte
- Runner-up: (Brazil) Thiago Seyboth Wild
- Score: 6–2, 6–7^{(4–7)}, 6–4

Events
| Singles | Doubles |
| ← 2019 · | Open du Pays d'Aix | · 2021 → |

Pablo Cuevas was the defending champion but lost in the quarterfinals to Daniel Altmaier.

Oscar Otte won the title after defeating Thiago Seyboth Wild 6–2, 6–7^{(4–7)}, 6–4 in the final.

== Seeds ==
1. (France) Gilles Simon (first round)
2. (Uruguay) Pablo Cuevas (quarterfinals)
3. (Italy) Gianluca Mager (first round)
4. (Bolivia) Hugo Dellien (first round)
5. (Spain) Roberto Carballés Baena (second round)
6. (Australia) Alexei Popyrin (first round)
7. (Argentina) Federico Coria (first round)
8. (Italy) Marco Cecchinato (second round)

== Draw ==
=== Key ===
- Q = Qualifier
- WC = Wild card
- LL = Lucky loser
- Alt = Alternate
- SE = Special exempt
- PR = Protected ranking
- ITF = ITF entry
- JE = Junior exempt
- w/o = Walkover
- r = Retired
- d = Defaulted
- SR = Special ranking

=== Finals ===
Semifinals
(Chile) Alejandro Tabilo | 6^{4} | 3
(Brazil) Thiago Seyboth Wild | 7^{7} | 6
SE | (Germany) Oscar Otte | 5
SE | (Germany) Daniel Altmaier | 4^{r}

Final
(Brazil) Thiago Seyboth Wild | 2 | 7^{7} | 4
SE | (Germany) Oscar Otte | 6 | 6^{4} | 6

=== Top half ===
First round
1/WC | (France) G Simon | 5 | 2
(Italy) F Gaio | 7 | 6
Q | (Sweden) E Ymer | 6 | 2 | 6
LL | (Belgium) R Bemelmans | 4 | 6 | 4
(Chile) A Tabilo | 7 | 7
(Italy) R Marcora | 5 | 5
(Egypt) M Safwat | 0 | 1
8 | (Italy) M Cecchinato | 6 | 6
3 | (Italy) G Mager | 3 | 5
(Brazil) T Seyboth Wild | 6 | 7
Q | (France) H Gaston | 3 | 7^{8} | 3
Q | (Dominican Republic) R Cid Subervi | 6 | 6^{6} | 6
(United States) B Klahn | 0 | 2
(France) A Hoang | 6 | 6
WC | (France) Q Halys | 7 | 6
6 | (Australia) A Popyrin | 5 | 3

Second round
(Italy) F Gaio | 6 | 6
Q | (Sweden) E Ymer | 4 | 4
(Chile) A Tabilo | 6 | 7^{7}
8 | (Italy) M Cecchinato | 3 | 6^{5}
(Brazil) T Seyboth Wild | 6 | 7
Q | (Dominican Republic) R Cid Subervi | 1 | 5
(France) A Hoang | 6 | 6
WC | (France) Q Halys | 3 | 3

Quarterfinals
(Italy) F Gaio | 6 | 2 | 4
(Chile) A Tabilo | 4 | 6 | 6
(Brazil) T Seyboth Wild | 3 | 6 | 6
(France) A Hoang | 6 | 2 | 1

Semifinals
(Chile) A Tabilo | 6^{4} | 3
(Brazil) T Seyboth Wild | 7^{7} | 6

=== Bottom half ===
First round
5 | (Spain) R Carballés Baena | 6 | 6
PR | (Germany) D Brown | 4 | 4
(Serbia) D Petrović | 6 | 6^{3} | 6
(Peru) JP Varillas | 1 | 7^{7} | 2
LL | (France) A Cazaux | 3 | 6 | 3
SE | (Germany) O Otte | 6 | 3 | 6
(Argentina) L Mayer | 6 | 6
4 | (Bolivia) H Dellien | 3 | 2
7 | (Argentina) F Coria | 1 | 6 | 3
SE | (Germany) D Altmaier | 6 | 4 | 6
(Portugal) P Sousa | 3 | 6 | 6
(Chinese Taipei) J Jung | 6 | 2 | 4
(Ecuador) E Gómez | 7^{9} | 3 | 4
WC | (France) H Mayot | 6^{7} | 6 | 6
Q | (Argentina) R Olivo | 2 | 3
2 | (Uruguay) P Cuevas | 6 | 6

Second round
5 | (Spain) R Carballés Baena | 7 | 3 | 5
(Serbia) D Petrović | 5 | 6 | 7
SE | (Germany) O Otte | 7^{7} | 6
(Argentina) L Mayer | 6^{5} | 3
SE | (Germany) D Altmaier | 7 | 6
(Portugal) P Sousa | 5 | 3
WC | (France) H Mayot | 3 | 4
2 | (Uruguay) P Cuevas | 6 | 6

Quarterfinals
(Serbia) D Petrović | 3 | 2
SE | (Germany) O Otte | 6 | 6
SE | (Germany) D Altmaier | 7 | 6
2 | (Uruguay) P Cuevas | 5 | 3

Semifinals
SE | (Germany) O Otte | 5
SE | (Germany) D Altmaier | 4^{r}
