= 2018 Open du Pays d'Aix =

- Date: 7–13 May
- Edition: 5th
- Draw: 32S / 16D
- Prize money: €127,000+H
- Surface: Clay
- Location: Aix-en-Provence, France

Champions

Singles
- (Australia) John Millman

Doubles
- (Germany) Philipp Petzschner / (Germany) Tim Pütz
| ← 2017 · | Open du Pays d'Aix | · 2019 → |

The 2018 Open du Pays d'Aix was a professional tennis tournament played on clay courts. It was the fifth edition of the tournament which was part of the 2018 ATP Challenger Tour. It took place in Aix-en-Provence, France between 7 and 13 May 2018.

== Singles main-draw entrants ==
=== Seeds ===
| Country | Player | Rank^{1} | Seed |
|---|---|---|---|
| AUS | John Millman | 69 | 1 |
| FRA | Jérémy Chardy | 87 | 2 |
| MDA | Radu Albot | 98 | 3 |
| GBR | Cameron Norrie | 103 | 4 |
| FRA | Calvin Hemery | 116 | 5 |
| CAN | Peter Polansky | 124 | 6 |
| UKR | Sergiy Stakhovsky | 126 | 7 |
| BRA | Thiago Monteiro | 131 | 8 |

- ^{1} Rankings as of 30 April 2018.

=== Other entrants ===
The following players received wildcards into the singles main draw:

- (France) Elliot Benchetrit
- (France) Geoffrey Blancaneaux
- (France) Alexandre Müller
- (France) Johan Tatlot

The following player received entry into the singles main draw as a special exempt:

- (Croatia) Nino Serdarušić

The following players received entry from the qualifying draw:

- (Canada) Steven Diez
- (Argentina) Máximo González
- (Italy) Gianluca Mager
- (Australia) Alexei Popyrin

== Champions ==
=== Singles ===
- (Australia) John Millman def. (Australia) Bernard Tomic 6–1, 6–2.

=== Doubles ===
- (Germany) Philipp Petzschner / (Germany) Tim Pütz def. (Argentina) Guido Andreozzi / (France) Kenny de Schepper 6–7^{(3–7)}, 6–2, [10–8].
