= 2015 Open du Pays d'Aix =

- Date: 4 – 10 May
- Edition: 2nd
- Draw: 32S / 15D
- Prize money: €64,000
- Surface: Clay
- Location: Aix-en-Provence, France

Champions

Singles
- (Netherlands) Robin Haase

Doubles
- (Netherlands) Robin Haase / (Pakistan) Aisam-ul-Haq Qureshi
- Open du Pays d'Aix

The 2015 Open du Pays d'Aix was a professional tennis tournament played on clay courts. It was the second edition of the tournament which was part of the 2015 ATP Challenger Tour. It took place in Aix-en-Provence, France between 4 and 10 May 2015.

== Singles main-draw entrants ==
=== Seeds ===
Country	Player	Rank^{1}	Seed
SLO	Blaž Kavčič	77	1
TUN	Malek Jaziri	84	2
FRA	Lucas Pouille	95	3
NED	Robin Haase	101	4
SRB	Filip Krajinović	104	5
SVK	Norbert Gombos	111	6
KAZ	Andrey Golubev	117	7
GER	Alexander Zverev	119	8

- ^{1} Rankings are as of April 28, 2015.

=== Other entrants ===
The following players received wildcards into the singles main draw:

- (France) Quentin Halys
- (France) Constant Lestienne
- (Germany) Florian Mayer
- (France) Lucas Pouille

The following players received entry as a special exempt to gain entry into the main draw:

- (Spain) Iñigo Cervantes Huegun
- (France) Maxime Hamou

The following players received entry from the qualifying draw:

- (Switzerland) Yann Marti
- (France) Jonathan Eysseric
- (France) Laurent Rochette
- (Brazil) José Pereira

The following players received entry as lucky losers:

- (Poland) Andriej Kapaś
- (France) Antoine Escoffier

== Doubles main-draw entrants ==
=== Seeds ===
Country	Player	Country	Player	Rank^{1}	Seed
NED	Robin Haase	PAK	Aisam-ul-Haq Qureshi	88	1
USA	Nicholas Monroe	NZL	Artem Sitak	106	2
GBR	Colin Fleming	GBR	Jonathan Marray	138	3
SWE	Johan Brunström	ISR	Jonathan Erlich	159	4

- ^{1} Rankings as of April 28, 2015.

=== Other entrants ===
The following pairs received wildcards into the doubles main draw:

- (France) Maxime Chazal / (France) Constant Lestienne
- (France) Mathias Bourgue / (France) David Guez

== Champions ==
=== Singles ===
- (Netherlands) Robin Haase def. (France) Paul-Henri Mathieu 7–6 ^{(7–1)}, 6–2

=== Doubles ===
- (Netherlands) Robin Haase / (Pakistan) Aisam-ul-Haq Qureshi def. (United States) Nicholas Monroe / (New Zealand) Artem Sitak 6–1, 6–2
