= 2022 Open du Pays d'Aix =

- Date: 2–8 May
- Edition: 9th
- Surface: Clay
- Location: Aix-en-Provence, France

Champions

Singles
- (France) Benjamin Bonzi

Doubles
- (France) Titouan Droguet / (France) Kyrian Jacquet
← 2021 ·	Open du Pays d'Aix	· 2023 →

The 2022 Open du Pays d'Aix was a professional tennis tournament played on clay courts. It was the ninth edition of the tournament which was part of the 2022 ATP Challenger Tour. It took place in Aix-en-Provence, France between 2 and 8 May 2022.

== Singles main-draw entrants ==
=== Seeds ===
Country	Player	Rank^{1}	Seed
FRA	Benjamin Bonzi	58	1
GER	Daniel Altmaier	67	2
FRA	Richard Gasquet	80	3
FRA	Quentin Halys	102	4
URU	Pablo Cuevas	107	5
PER	Juan Pablo Varillas	111	6
ESP	Fernando Verdasco	118	7
FRA	Corentin Moutet	120	8

- ^{1} Rankings as of 25 April 2022.

=== Other entrants ===
The following players received wildcards into the singles main draw:

- (France) Titouan Droguet
- (France) Sascha Gueymard Wayenburg
- (France) Jo-Wilfried Tsonga

The following players received entry into the singles main draw as alternates:

- (France) Grégoire Barrère
- (France) Antoine Hoang

The following players received entry from the qualifying draw:

- (France) Mathias Bourgue
- (Uruguay) Martín Cuevas
- (France) Gabriel Debru
- (France) Calvin Hemery
- (France) Kyrian Jacquet
- (Australia) Alexei Popyrin

== Champions ==
=== Singles ===
- (France) Benjamin Bonzi def. (France) Grégoire Barrère 6–2, 6–4.

=== Doubles ===
- (France) Titouan Droguet / (France) Kyrian Jacquet def. (Colombia) Nicolás Barrientos / (Mexico) Miguel Ángel Reyes-Varela 6–2, 6–3.
