= 2023 Open Aix Provence =

- Date: 2–7 May
- Edition: 10th
- Surface: Clay
- Location: Aix-en-Provence, France

Champions

Singles
- (United Kingdom) Andy Murray

Doubles
- (Australia) Jason Kubler / (Australia) John Peers
| ← 2022 · | Open Aix Provence | · 2024 → |

The 2023 Open Aix Provence, known as the Open Aix Provence Crédit Agricole, was a professional tennis tournament played on clay courts. It was the tenth edition of the tournament which was part of the 2023 ATP Challenger Tour. It took place in Aix-en-Provence, France between 2 and 7 May 2023.

== Singles main-draw entrants ==
=== Seeds ===
| Country | Player | Rank^{1} | Seed |
|---|---|---|---|
| USA | Tommy Paul | 17 | 1 |
| USA | Brandon Nakashima | 44 | 2 |
| FRA | Adrian Mannarino | 46 | 3 |
| ~~SWE~~ | ~~Mikael Ymer~~ | ~~50~~ | ~~4~~ |
| GBR | Andy Murray | 52 | 5 |
| KAZ | Alexander Bublik | 55 | 6 |
| FRA | Grégoire Barrère | 56 | 7 |
| ARG | Tomás Martín Etcheverry | 59 | 8 |

- ^{1} Rankings as of 24 April 2023.

=== Other entrants ===
The following players received wildcards into the singles main draw:

- (France) Gaël Monfils
- (United Kingdom) Andy Murray
- (United States) Tommy Paul

The following players received entry into the singles main draw as alternates:

- (France) Geoffrey Blancaneaux
- (Italy) Riccardo Bonadio
- (France) Laurent Lokoli
- (France) Benoît Paire
- (Portugal) João Sousa

The following players received entry from the qualifying draw:

- (France) Arthur Cazaux
- Ivan Gakhov
- (Netherlands) Robin Haase
- (Serbia) Hamad Međedović

The following players received entry as lucky losers:

- (France) Dan Added
- (France) Harold Mayot

== Champions ==
=== Singles ===
- (United Kingdom) Andy Murray def. (United States) Tommy Paul 2–6, 6–1, 6–2.

=== Doubles ===
- (Australia) Jason Kubler / (Australia) John Peers def. (Portugal) Nuno Borges / (Portugal) Francisco Cabral 6–7^{(5–7)}, 6–4, [10–7].
