= 2016 Open du Pays d'Aix =

- Date: 2 – 8 May
- Edition: 3rd
- Draw: 32S / 15D
- Prize money: €85,000+H
- Surface: Clay
- Location: Aix-en-Provence, France

Champions

Singles
- (Brazil) Thiago Monteiro

Doubles
- (Austria) Oliver Marach / (Austria) Philipp Oswald
- Open du Pays d'Aix

The 2016 Open du Pays d'Aix was a professional tennis tournament played on clay courts. It was the third edition of the tournament which was part of the 2016 ATP Challenger Tour. It took place in Aix-en-Provence, France between 2 and 8 May 2016.

== Singles main-draw entrants ==
=== Seeds ===
Country	Player	Rank^{1}	Seed
CZE	Lukáš Rosol	65	1
ARG	Diego Schwartzman	87	2
BRA	Rogério Dutra Silva	101	3
FRA	Stéphane Robert	116	4
GER	Mischa Zverev	129	5
SWE	Elias Ymer	132	6
GER	Daniel Brands	135	7
ARG	Máximo González	136	8

- ^{1} Rankings as of April 25, 2016.

=== Other entrants ===
The following players received wildcards into the singles main draw:

- (France) Calvin Hemery
- (France) Maxime Chazal
- (France) Grégoire Barrère
- (France) Julien Benneteau

The following players received entry as a special exempt to gain entry into the main draw:

- (France) Constant Lestienne
- (Czech Republic) Marek Michalička

The following player received entry as a protected ranking to gain entry into the main draw:

- (France) Albano Olivetti

The following players received entry from the qualifying draw:

- (Switzerland) Yann Marti
- (Croatia) Nikola Mektić
- (Belgium) Yannik Reuter
- (France) Martin Vaïsse

The following players entered as a lucky loser:

- (France) David Guez

== Champions ==
=== Singles ===
- (Brazil) Thiago Monteiro def. (Argentina) Carlos Berlocq, 4–6, 6–4, 6–1

=== Doubles ===
- (Austria) Oliver Marach / (Austria) Philipp Oswald def. (Argentina) Guillermo Durán / (Argentina) Máximo González, 6–1, 4–6, [10–7]
