= 2017 Open du Pays d'Aix =

- Date: 8 – 14 May
- Edition: 4th
- Draw: 32S / 16D
- Prize money: €127,000+H
- Surface: Clay
- Location: Aix-en-Provence, France

Champions

Singles
- (United States) Frances Tiafoe

Doubles
- (Netherlands) Wesley Koolhof / (Netherlands) Matwé Middelkoop
- Open du Pays d'Aix

The 2017 Open du Pays d'Aix was a professional tennis tournament played on clay courts. It was the fourth edition of the tournament which was part of the 2017 ATP Challenger Tour. It took place in Aix-en-Provence, France between 8 and 14 May 2017.

== Singles main-draw entrants ==
=== Seeds ===
Country	Player	Rank^{1}	Seed
TUN	Malek Jaziri	68	1
BRA	Rogério Dutra Silva	69	2
FRA	Jérémy Chardy	71	3
USA	Frances Tiafoe	80	4
SRB	Dušan Lajović	84	5
ARG	Renzo Olivo	89	6
SVK	Norbert Gombos	103	7
FRA	Julien Benneteau	104	8

- ^{1} Rankings as of May 1, 2017.

=== Other entrants ===
The following players received wildcards into the singles main draw:

- (France) Maxime Janvier
- (France) Corentin Moutet
- (France) Alexandre Müller

The following player received entry into the singles main draw as an alternate:

- (Portugal) Pedro Sousa

The following player received entry into the singles main draw using a special exempt:

- (United States) Tommy Paul

The following players received entry from the qualifying draw:

- (France) Elliot Benchetrit
- (France) Maxime Hamou
- (Argentina) Andrés Molteni
- (Sweden) Mikael Ymer

The following players received entry as lucky losers:

- (Belgium) Clément Geens
- (France) Axel Michon
- (France) Louis Tessa

== Champions ==
=== Singles ===
- (United States) Frances Tiafoe def. (France) Jérémy Chardy 6–3, 4–6, 7–6^{(7–5)}.

=== Doubles ===
- (Netherlands) Wesley Koolhof / (Netherlands) Matwé Middelkoop def. (Germany) Andre Begemann / (France) Jérémy Chardy 2–6, 6–4, [16–14].
