= 2020 Open du Pays d'Aix – Doubles =

Doubles
- 2020 Open du Pays d'Aix

Final
- Champions: (Argentina) Andrés Molteni (Monaco) Hugo Nys
- Runners-up: (Uruguay) Ariel Behar (Ecuador) Gonzalo Escobar
- Score: 6–4, 7–6^{(7–4)}

Events
| Singles | Doubles |
- Open du Pays d'Aix

Kevin Krawietz and Jürgen Melzer were the defending champions but chose not to defend their title.

Andrés Molteni and Hugo Nys won the title after defeating Ariel Behar and Gonzalo Escobar 6–4, 7–6^{(7–4)} in the final.

== Seeds ==
1. (Italy) Simone Bolelli / (Argentina) Máximo González (semifinals)
2. (Uruguay) Ariel Behar / (Ecuador) Gonzalo Escobar (final)
3. (Argentina) Andrés Molteni / (Monaco) Hugo Nys (champions)
4. (Venezuela) Luis David Martínez / (Mexico) Miguel Ángel Reyes-Varela (semifinals)

== Draw ==
Key

- Q = Qualifier
- WC = Wild card
- LL = Lucky loser
- Alt = Alternate
- ITF = ITF entry
- PR = Protected ranking
- SR = Special ranking
- SE = Special exempt
- JE = Junior exempt
- JR = Junior Accelerator Programme entrant
- CO = College Accelerator Programme entrant
- NG = Next Gen Accelerator Program entrant
- w/o = Walkover
- r = Retired
- d = Defaulted

First round
1 | (Italy) S Bolelli (Argentina) M González | 6 | 7^{8}
(United States) A Lawson (United States) H Reese | 4 | 6^{6}
(Monaco) R Arneodo (France) Q Halys | w/o
(Philippines) T Huey (United States) N Lammons
3 | (Argentina) A Molteni (Monaco) H Nys | 6 | 6
(Uruguay) P Cuevas (Argentina) R Olivo | 3 | 3
WC | (France) E Couacaud (France) A Olivetti | 3 | 7 | [10]
(Brazil) R Matos (Brazil) T Seyboth Wild | 6 | 5 | [7]
(Brazil) F Meligeni Alves (Brazil) F Romboli | 7 | 7
(Chinese Taipei) J Jung (United States) B Klahn | 5 | 5
(Argentina) F Coria (Bolivia) H Dellien | 1 | 6 | [5]
4 | (Venezuela) LD Martínez (Mexico) MÁ Reyes-Varela | 6 | 4 | [10]
(Argentina) A Collarini (Argentina) L Mayer | 4 | 3
WC | (France) B Bonzi (France) A Hoang | 6 | 6
WC | (France) A Cazaux (France) H Mayot | 5 | 4
2 | (Uruguay) A Behar (Ecuador) G Escobar | 7 | 6

Quarterfinals
1 | (Italy) S Bolelli (Argentina) M González | 6 | 6
(Monaco) R Arneodo (France) Q Halys | 4 | 2
3 | (Argentina) A Molteni (Monaco) H Nys | 6 | 6
WC | (France) E Couacaud (France) A Olivetti | 4 | 4
(Brazil) F Meligeni Alves (Brazil) F Romboli | 2^{r}
4 | (Venezuela) LD Martínez (Mexico) MÁ Reyes-Varela | 1
WC | (France) B Bonzi (France) A Hoang | 4 | 6 | [7]
2 | (Uruguay) A Behar (Ecuador) G Escobar | 6 | 4 | [10]

Semifinals
1 | (Italy) S Bolelli (Argentina) M González | 5 | 3
3 | (Argentina) A Molteni (Monaco) H Nys | 7 | 6
4 | (Venezuela) LD Martínez (Mexico) MÁ Reyes-Varela | 4 | 2
2 | (Uruguay) A Behar (Ecuador) G Escobar | 6 | 6

Final
3 | (Argentina) A Molteni (Monaco) H Nys | 6 | 7^{7}
2 | (Uruguay) A Behar (Ecuador) G Escobar | 4 | 6^{4}
