= 2020 Open du Pays d'Aix =

Tennis tournament

- Date: 7–13 September
- Edition: 7th
- Draw: 32S / 16D
- Surface: Clay
- Location: Aix-en-Provence, France

Champions

Singles
- (Germany) Oscar Otte

Doubles
- (Argentina) Andrés Molteni / (Monaco) Hugo Nys
- Open du Pays d'Aix

The 2020 Open du Pays d'Aix was a professional tennis tournament played on clay courts. It was the seventh edition of the tournament which was part of the 2020 ATP Challenger Tour. It took place in Aix-en-Provence, France between 7 and 13 September 2020.

== Singles main-draw entrants ==
=== Seeds ===
Country	Player	Rank^{1}	Seed
FRA	Gilles Simon	52	1
URU	Pablo Cuevas	61	2
ITA	Gianluca Mager	80	3
BOL	Hugo Dellien	97	4
ESP	Roberto Carballés Baena	101	5
AUS	Alexei Popyrin	102	6
ARG	Federico Coria	103	7
ITA	Marco Cecchinato	108	8

- ^{1} Rankings as of 31 August 2020.

=== Other entrants ===
The following players received wildcards into the singles main draw:

- (France) Quentin Halys
- (France) Harold Mayot
- (France) Gilles Simon

The following player received entry into the singles main draw using a protected ranking:

- (Germany) Dustin Brown

The following players received entry into the singles main draw as special exempts:

- (Germany) Daniel Altmaier
- (Germany) Oscar Otte

The following players received entry from the qualifying draw:

- (Dominican Republic) Roberto Cid Subervi
- (France) Hugo Gaston
- (Argentina) Renzo Olivo
- (Sweden) Elias Ymer

The following players received entry as lucky losers:

- (Belgium) Ruben Bemelmans
- (France) Arthur Cazaux

== Champions ==
=== Singles ===
- (Germany) Oscar Otte def. (Brazil) Thiago Seyboth Wild 6–2, 6–7^{(4–7)}, 6–4.

=== Doubles ===
- (Argentina) Andrés Molteni / (Monaco) Hugo Nys def. (Uruguay) Ariel Behar / (Ecuador) Gonzalo Escobar 6–4, 7–6^{(7–4)}.
