= John Millman =

Australian tennis player (born 1989)

John Millman OLY
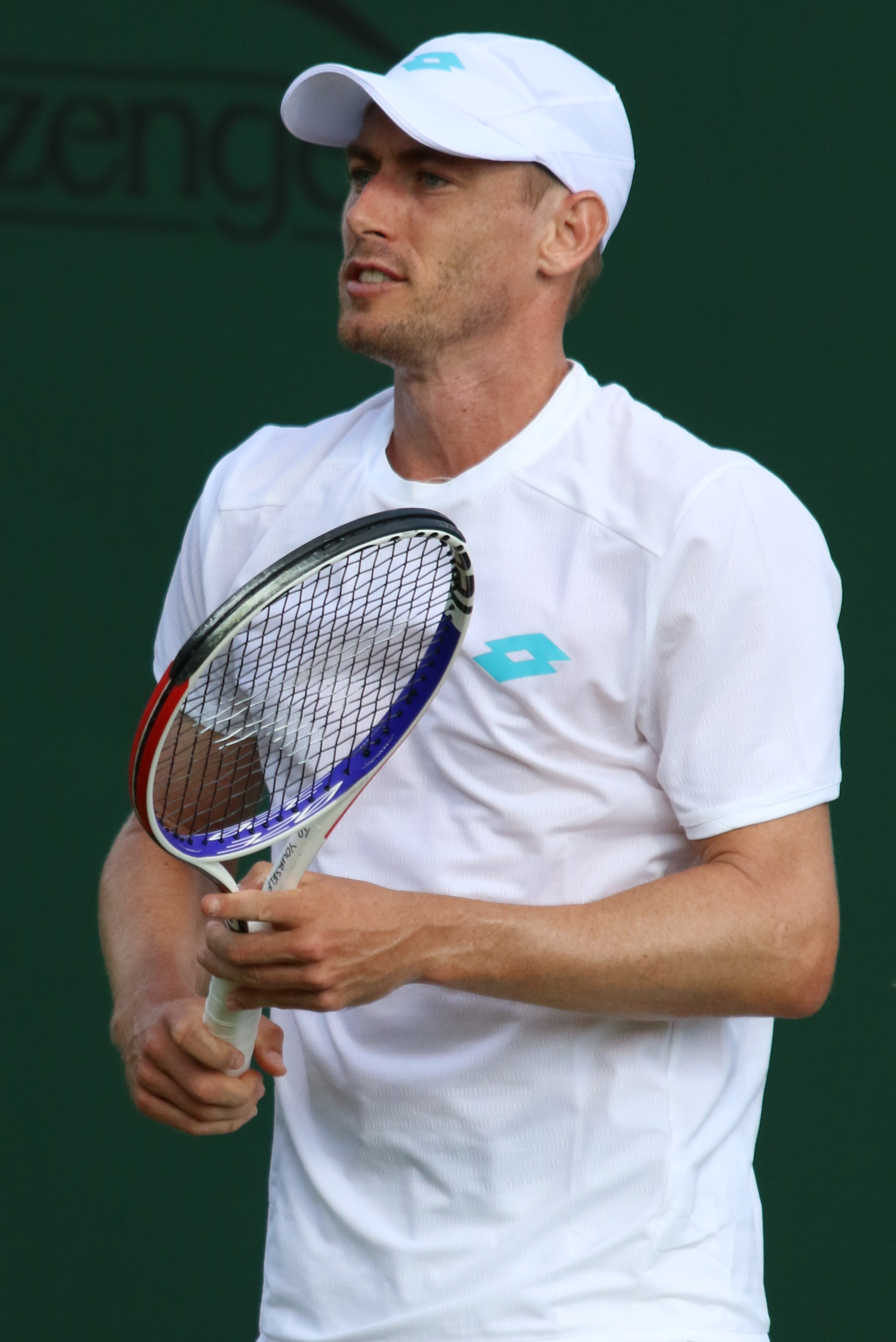
- Millman at the Wimbledon Championships in 2019
- Country (sports): Australia
- Residence: Brisbane, Queensland, Australia
- Born: 14 June 1989 (age 37) Brisbane, Queensland, Australia
- Height: 1.83 m (6 ft 0 in)
- Turned pro: 2006
- Retired: January 2024
- Plays: Right-handed (two-handed backhand)
- Prize money: US$5,472,109

Singles
- Career record: 121–149 (44.81%) (Note: In Grand Slams, ATP Tour level, and Davis Cups)
- Career titles: 1
- Highest ranking: No. 33 (15 October 2018)

Grand Slam singles results
- Australian Open: 3R (2016, 2020)
- French Open: 1R (2016, 2017, 2018, 2019, 2020, 2022)
- Wimbledon: 3R (2016, 2019)
- US Open: QF (2018)

Other tournaments
- Olympic Games: 2R (2016, 2021)

Doubles
- Career record: 17–42
- Career titles: 0
- Highest ranking: No. 165 (11 June 2018)

Grand Slam doubles results
- Australian Open: 3R (2021)
- French Open: 2R (2018)
- Wimbledon: 1R (2018, 2021)
- US Open: 2R (2017, 2021)

Other doubles tournaments
- Olympic Games: 1R (2021)

Grand Slam mixed doubles results
- Australian Open: 1R (2016)

Team competitions
- Davis Cup: SF (2017)
- Last updated on: 12 January 2024.

John H. Millman (born 14 June 1989) is an Australian former professional tennis player. He won one title on the ATP Tour, the 2020 Astana Open, reaching a career-high ATP singles ranking of world No. 33 in October 2018. His other career highlights included reaching the quarterfinals of the 2018 US Open (beating then-world No. 2 Roger Federer en route), reaching the finals of the 2019 Japan Open and 2018 Hungarian Open and winning twelve ATP Challenger Tour titles.

Millman represented Australia on numerous occasions, including in the Davis Cup and ATP Cup and at two Summer Olympics.

Millman retired from tennis after the 2024 Australian Open.

== Personal life ==
Millman was born in Brisbane, Australia, into a family of five children (four girls) and he is the second youngest. During his schooling years he attended Brisbane Grammar School then the Anglican Church Grammar School . Outside tennis he enjoys soccer and supports Liverpool F.C. who compete in the English Premier League. In January 2019, Millman received the OLY post-nominal title at the Brisbane International tournament.

Millman is a longtime tennis commentator with Australian sports broadcasters.

== Junior career ==
Millman made his ITF junior tournament debut in Darwin as a 15-year-old in 2004 and reached the quarterfinals. He made his junior Grand Slam debut at the 2006 Australian Open. He won his first junior tournament in June 2006 at a tournament held in New Caledonia. He then won his next two tournaments in a row held in Fiji and New Zealand respectively. He competed in his last junior tournament at the 2007 Australian Open.

== Professional career ==
=== 2008–12: First Future & Challenger titles, top 200 ===
In 2008, Millman started to pursue professional tennis. He won the F8 Futures in Australia, was runner-up at an F1 in Romania losing to Răzvan Sabău and made the semis of a Morocco F5 tournament. In 2009, Millman's success on the junior circuit continued, making the final of an F2 in Bulgaria and claiming three semi-final appearances: two in Italy and one in Bulgaria. In the same year, Millman injured his back while training with the Australian junior Davis Cup team. Millman improved his career ranking from close to 1,000 to the 300s in 2009. He achieved this by a semi-final performance in a Challenger tournament in Burnie, Tasmania. He won his second Futures event in Kalgoorlie defeating Matthew Ebden and made the second round of qualifying at the Australian Open.

Millman started 2010 by winning a wildcard entry into his hometown tournament, the Brisbane International. Unfortunately, he was drawn to play defending champion Radek Štěpánek in the first round and lost in straight sets. Millman reached the final round of qualifying at the Australian Open qualifying losing to Ukrainian Illya Marchenko. He won his third Futures title in Berri on grass defeating Greg Jones in the final in February. In September, Millman returned to Australia to claim his fourth Futures title of his career in Darwin. In October, he won his first Challenger title in Sacramento by defeating Robert Kendrick.

Millman was again awarded a wildcard into the 2011 Brisbane International main draw where he lost to fellow Australian Matt Ebden. He then competed in Sydney and Australian Open qualifying but fell in the second round in both tournaments. He then competed in Challengers spread across Asia, Australia and Europe before injuring his shoulder during an Italian futures tournament in April. He continued playing injured until Wimbledon qualifying where he lost in the first round to Fritz Wolmarans. Following the loss at Wimbledon he returned to Australia and did not compete in a tennis tournament again until 2012.

At the beginning of 2012 Millman used his protected ranking to enter the Brisbane International qualifying tournament and managed to win three matches to qualify for the main draw, where he lost in the first round to Santiago Giraldo. He then travelled to Melbourne to compete in Australian Open qualifying but was ousted in the first round by Vasek Pospisil. After a year with mixed results on the Future and Challenger circuits, Millman won his first title in over two years in Bendigo where he defeated Ben Mitchell in the final. He finished 2012 with a ranking of World No. 199.

=== 2013–15: Continued Challenger success, injuries and top 100 ===
Millman began 2013 at the Brisbane International where he entered qualifying and recorded straight set wins over Luke Saville, Alex Bogomolov and Donald Young to make it into the main draw. He then recorded his first ever ATP win against Tatsuma Ito in the first round. Following that victory, he was awarded a main draw wildcard into the 2013 Australian Open. In the second round of Brisbane he faced World No. 3 Andy Murray and lost in three sets.

Following an impressive performance at the Brisbane International, an Australian writer/sports physiologist coined the term 'Millminions' to describe Millman's extensive and loyal fans base. This has since been adopted by the Australian tennis community.

Millman received a wildcard entry into the Apia International Sydney and defeated Tommy Robredo in the first round. He next took on the third seed, Andreas Seppi for a place in the quarterfinals. Millman impressed taking a set off the world No. 23, but eventually lost in three sets.

Millman then competed at the 2013 Australian Open as a wildcard, which was his debut in the main draw at his home slam. He played World No. 84 Tatsuma Ito in the first round. Millman had recently defeated Ito at the Brisbane International, but Ito got the better of Millman in an epic 5 set match 4–6, 4–6, 6–3, 6–0, 5–7. After the loss, Millman mentioned ambitions to make the top 100 by the end of the year.

Millman then played a $50,000 Challenger event at the 2013 McDonald's Burnie International. He defeated compatriot Benjamin Mitchell in the first round despite losing the first set. Although having a first round scare, he cruised through to the final where he faced Stéphane Robert. Millman won the match for his second Challenger title. Attempting to build on his early success in Challenger events in 2013, Millman took part in the $35,000 Shimadzu All Japan Indoor Tennis Championships in Kyoto, Japan. He defeated Marco Chiudinelli in the final to claim his second Challenger title of the year.

Millman was awarded a wild card into the French Open but on 20 May 2013, he announced his withdrawal due to a shoulder injury. Millman was replaced by countryman and rising star Nick Kyrgios who previously had a wildcard for qualification rounds.

Millman did not play a match since May 2013, but he announced via Twitter on 19 February 2014, that he hoped to be back playing by the end of March. It was later announced that his first competition in eleven months would be the Chengdu China F4, commencing on 7 April, where he made the quarter-final. His ranking as of June 2014 had fallen to 1193. In August 2014, Millman won the Korea F10 and F11. These were his first titles in 17 months. In September, Millman made the semi-final of the Sacramento Challenger, losing in three sets to world number 54 Sam Querrey. The following week, Millman made the final of the Tiburon Challenger, but again lost to Sam Querrey in two sets. He rose 241 ranking positions in these two weeks; up to 285. In November, Millman won his fourth career Challenger title at the Traralgon 2 against James Ward.

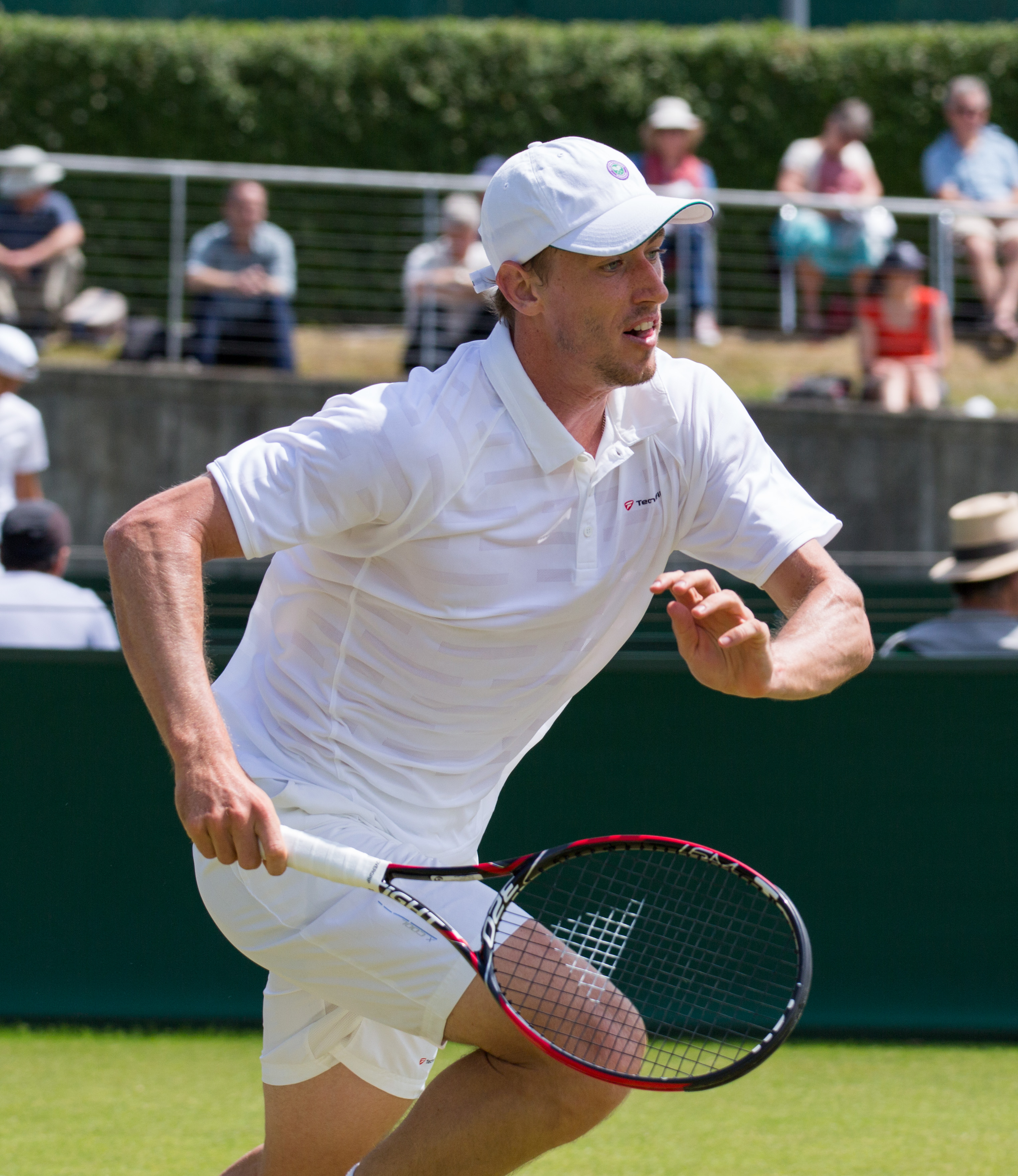
Millman in 2015

Millman commenced the 2015 season at the 2015 Brisbane International with a wild card into the main draw. He defeated Rhyne Williams in round one and almost caused an upset, leading world no. 2 Roger Federer in round two 6–4, 3–1 before losing 6–4, 4–6, 3–6. At the 2015 Australian Open, Millman received another wildcard and lost in the first round to Leonardo Mayer in straight sets.

In February 2015, Millman was forced to retire in round 1 of the Burnie Challenger with a lower back concern. He returned to complete in the Kyoto Challenger where he reached the final but lost 3–6, 6–3, 3–6 against Michał Przysiężny. Millman lost in round of qualifying at the French Open, then played Vicenza Challenger where he was seeded 6th and lost in the final to Íñigo Cervantes. In June, Millman secured his first Grand Slam main draw entry via qualifying for the first time in his career at Wimbledon. Millman defeated 19th seed Tommy Robredo in round 1, before losing to Marcos Baghdatis in round two, despite having a 2 sets to 0 lead. This result increased Millman's ranking and he reached the top 100 for the first time in July 2015. In August, Millman won his sixth and seventh Challenger titles in Kentucky and Aptos.

Millman ended 2015 with a ranking of World No. 92.

=== 2016: Third round at Major and double-bagel Olympic record ===
Millman commenced 2016 making the second round of Chennai, before playing in Sydney after being awarded a wildcard. He lost in round one to Tommy Robredo.

He advanced past the first round of the 2016 Australian Open, for the first time in his career with a victory over Argentinian Diego Schwartzman. In the second round Millman defeated Luxembourg world no. 38 Gilles Müller in five sets to advance to the third round of a Grand Slam for the first time in his career. In the third round, Millman fell to fellow Australian and 16th seed Bernard Tomic.

He then reached the quarterfinals of the 2016 Montpellier Open with wins over Julien Benneteau and Édouard Roger-Vasselin. He lost to eventual finalist Paul-Henri Mathieu. Millman next competed at the 2016 Memphis Open, where he defeated Austin Krajicek in the first round before losing to Benjamin Becker. He next suffered back-to-back losses at the 2016 Delray Beach Open and the 2016 Acapulco Open, losing to Steve Johnson and world no. 8 David Ferrer respectively. He next competed at the 2016 Indian Wells tournament, where he defeated Alexander Sarkissian before again losing to Steve Johnson. He then played at the 2016 Miami Open, where he defeated Pablo Carreño before losing to Pablo Cuevas.

Millman next played at the 2016 French Open. He was pulled against 15th seed John Isner. He lost despite winning the first set and having eight set points in the second set and a few in the third set. In the second set, Millman led 5–4 40–0 and was serving, but was still not able to capitalize.

Millman next competed at the 2016 MercedesCup, where he reached the second round.

Millman next competed at the third Grand Slam of the year at the 2016 Wimbledon Championships. He started off against Albert Montañés. He was down two sets to one but came back to win. He then reached the third round of a major for the second time in his career after beating 26th seed Benoît Paire in four sets. He lost there in straight sets against 2nd seed Andy Murray.

Millman reached the second round at the Citi Open, before retiring during his first round match at the Rogers Cup.

Millman then played at the Olympics for the first time. He defeated Ričardas Berankis without losing a single game in the first round, marking this the first time in Olympic tennis history that any player won a match in such fashion. Millman's second round match was against fourth seed Kei Nishikori. Millman served for the opening set and was up 4–0 in the first set tiebreak and was even up a break in the second set but eventually ended up losing in straight sets.

In August, Millman qualified for and made the second round of Cincinnati Masters then made the semifinals of the 2016 Winston-Salem Open; defeating Albert Ramos Viñolas and Richard Gasquet along the way. At the US Open, Millman lost to 8th seed Dominic Thiem in round one, despite leading 2 sets to 1. In October, Millman reached the semifinal of the 2016 Ningbo Challenger but was forced to retire with a hip injury.

Millman ended 2016 with a ranking of World No. 84.

=== 2017: Injuries and Davis Cup semifinal ===
Millman was given a wildcard into the 2017 Brisbane International but withdrew prior to the tournament with a hip injury, which sidelined him for the first five months of the season.

Millman made his return at the Mestre Challenger in May, losing in the first round. At the French Open, just one week after re-joining the tour, Millman lost to 17th seed Roberto Bautista Agut in four sets. Following his exit at Roland Garros, Millman went on to compete in three Challenger events in the lead up to Wimbledon, but failed to make it past the second round in any tournament. At Wimbledon, Millman drew Rafael Nadal in the first round and was easily beaten in straight sets. After little success since returning from injury, Millman had a breakthrough at the Lexington Challenger in August, making it to the final before being defeated by Michael Mmoh in three sets.

At the US Open, Millman produced his best tennis of the season to upset fellow Aussie Nick Kyrgios and Malek Jaziri to progress to the third round, where he eventually lost to Philipp Kohlschreiber.

In September, Millman made his Davis Cup debut in the world group semi-final against Belgium. Millman lost to world number 12 David Goffin. Millman then reached the quarter-finals or better in five consecutive Challengers across Asia, winning Hua Hin. Millman ended 2017 with a singles ranking of World No. 128.

=== 2018: Breakthrough: First ATP final, Major quarterfinal after win over Federer, top 50 and career-high ranking ===
Millman commenced 2018 with a wildcard into the 2018 Brisbane International. He defeated Peter Polansky in round one and had two match points against world number 3 Grigor Dimitrov before losing in three sets. Millman reached the second round of the 2018 Sydney International and Australian Open. In February, Millman won the Kyoto Challenger, the tenth of his career, propelling him back into the world's top 100 after a 12-month absence.

In April, Millman reached his second ATP World Tour semi-final and his first final at Budapest International after saving three match points against Aljaž Bedene in the semi-final. He lost to Marco Cecchinato in the final. In May, Millman won the Aix-en-Provence Challenger, but lost to Denis Shapovalov in the first round of the French Open. In June, Millman qualified for Queen's Club but lost to Novak Djokovic in round 1. He reached the quarterfinal of Eastbourne losing to Marco Cecchinato again. At Wimbledon, Millman lost to Milos Raonic in the second round. By July, Millman's ranking peaked inside the top 50 for the first time.

In September, Millman pulled off a huge upset by defeating the second seed Roger Federer in the fourth round of the US Open, in four sets. This was Millman's first win over a top-ten player and saw him advance to his first Grand Slam quarterfinal, where he lost to eventual champion Novak Djokovic in straight sets.

Millman reached a career-high of World No. 33 on 15 October 2018 and ended 2018 with a singles rank of World No. 38.

=== 2019: Second ATP final and Davis Cup quarterfinal ===
Millman commenced the season at the Brisbane International, where he lost in the second round to Grigor Dimitrov. At the Sydney International, he reached the quarterfinals, before losing to Gilles Simon in three tight sets. At the Australian Open, Millman defeated Federico Delbonis, before losing to Roberto Bautista Agut in the second round.

At the French Open, Millman was defeated by 5th seed Alexander Zverev in the opening round on Court Philippe-Chatrier.

Entering the grass court season, Millman had disappointing results in the Stuttgart Open, Halle Open and Eastbourne International enduring first round exits in all three. However, he found form at Wimbledon, progressing to an equal career-best 3rd round with victories over Hugo Dellien and 31st seed Laslo Djere before falling to Sam Querrey in straight sets. At the Rogers Cup, Millman reached the second round as a lucky loser.

At the US Open, Millman lost in the first round to eventual champion Rafael Nadal. In September, Millman won the OEC Kaohsiung Challenger. At the Japan Open, Millman made his way to the finals, where he faced Novak Djokovic, but finished short of winning his first ATP title by losing in straight sets.

Millman ended 2019 with a singles rank of World No. 48.

=== 2020: First ATP title, near-second Federer defeat, top 50 year-end ranking 3 years in a row ===
Millman began his season at the ASB Classic in Auckland where he defeated Michael Mmoh and Karen Khachanov to make the quarter-finals against eventual runner-up Benoît Paire, who he lost to in three sets. After playing the ATP Cup, he played the Australian Open where he reached the third round against Roger Federer. In a close match that was considered one of the best of the tournament, he lost 6–4, 6–7, 4–6, 6–4, 6–7 which put him close to defeating Federer and causing an upset for a second time.

Millman had disappointing results over the rest of the American hard court season, losing in first and second round matches in Delray Beach, Acapulco, Cincinnati, and the US Open, where he lost to Frances Tiafoe in the second round.

Millman won the singles title at the 2020 Astana Open, defeating Adrian Mannarino 7–5, 6–1 in the final on 1 November 2020 to secure his first, and what would ultimately be his only, ATP Tour title.

Millman ended 2020 with a singles rank of World No. 38.

=== 2021–22: Olympics in singles and doubles ===
In July, Millman represented Australia at the 2020 Summer Olympics. He was defeated by Alejandro Davidovich Fokina in the second round. He also participated in the doubles competition with Luke Saville.

At the 2021 Sofia Open he reached his fourth quarterfinal for the season (after Munich, Washington and Astana in Nur-Sultan), and for a second year in a row at the tournament, where he lost to Marcos Giron in 70 minutes. Millman was aiming to reach his first tour-level semifinal since Astana in 2020, where he won his maiden ATP Tour trophy. Millman ended 2021 with a singles rank of World No. 72.

=== 2023–24: Loss of form, Retirement ===
Millman received a wildcard into the 2023 Australian Open where he reached the second round after a five set match against Marc-Andrea Huesler. He lost to seventh seed Daniil Medvedev.

In October 2023, Millman was selected as the No. 2 ATP player at the 2024 United Cup as part of team Australia.

On 9 November 2023, Millman announced that he would retire from professional tennis at the end of the 2024 Australian Summer of tennis.

He retired from singles tournaments after failing to qualify for the main draw of the Australian Open on 11 January 2024., but played in the doubles with Edward Winter, losing in the second round to Rohan Bopanna and Matthew Ebden in his last professional career match on 19 January 2024.

== Fan popularity ==
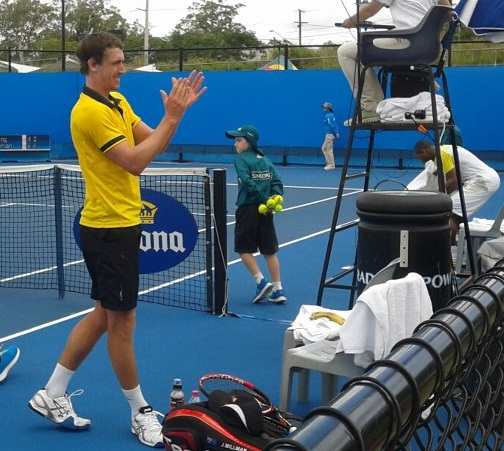
Millman applauding his fans after a match at the 2013 Brisbane International.

Millman revealed in early 2012 that support he received while injured and contemplating retirement in 2011 gave him the drive to continue pursuing tennis as a career. While competing at his hometown tournament, the 2013 Brisbane International, Millman received an immense amount of support at every match he competed in. It was later revealed his supporters had developed a reputation in the locker room. Millman is well known for thanking his supporters following each match and often hands out drinks from the fridge to his fans at the conclusion of his matches. Following his match against Andy Murray, the hashtag term '#Millman' began trending worldwide on Twitter for several hours.

=== Millmania ===
Following Millman's first-round victory at the 2013 Brisbane International, Brisbane Times journalist Phil Lutton coined the term 'Millmania' to describe his sudden success. The Sydney Morning Herald continued using the term at the Apia International.

== Performance timelines ==
Key
W	F	SF	QF	#R	RR	Q#	P#	DNQ	A	Z#	PO	G	S	B	NMS	NTI	P	NH

(W) winner; (F) finalist; (SF) semifinalist; (QF) quarterfinalist; (#R) rounds 4, 3, 2, 1; (RR) round-robin stage; (Q#) qualification round; (P#) preliminary round; (DNQ) did not qualify; (A) absent; (Z#) Davis/Fed Cup Zonal Group (with number indication) or (PO) play-off; (G) gold, (S) silver or (B) bronze Olympic/Paralympic medal; (NMS) not a Masters tournament; (NTI) not a Tier I tournament; (P) postponed; (NH) not held; (SR) strike rate (events won / competed); (W–L) win–loss record.
To avoid confusion and double counting, these charts are updated at the conclusion of a tournament or when the player's participation has ended.

=== Singles ===
Tournament	2008	2009	2010	2011	2012	2013	2014	2015	2016	2017	2018	2019	2020	2021	2022	2023	2024	SR	W–L
Grand Slam tournaments
Australian Open	A	Q2	Q3	Q2	Q1	1R	A	1R	3R	A	2R	2R	3R	1R	2R	2R	Q2	0 / 9	8–9
French Open	A	A	A	Q2	A	A	A	Q1	1R	1R	1R	1R	1R	A	1R	A	A	0 / 6	0–6
Wimbledon	A	A	Q1	Q1	A	A	A	2R	3R	1R	2R	3R	NH	1R	1R	A	A	0 / 7	6–7
US Open	A	A	Q3	A	A	A	A	1R	1R	3R	QF	1R	2R	1R	1R	Q2	A	0 / 8	7–8
Win–loss	0–0	0–0	0–0	0–0	0–0	0–1	0–0	1–3	4–4	2–3	6–4	3–4	3–3	0–3	1–4	1–1	0–0	0 / 30	21–30
National representation
Summer Olympics	A	NH			A	NH			2R	NH				2R	NH		A	0 / 2	2–2
Davis Cup	A	A	A	A	A	A	A	A	A	SF	A	QF	RR		A	A	A	0 / 3	3–3
ATP Masters 1000
Indian Wells Masters	A	A	A	A	A	A	A	A	2R	A	A	1R	NH	2R	2R	A	A	0 / 4	3–4
Miami Open	A	A	A	A	A	A	A	A	2R	A	2R	2R	NH	A	1R	A	A	0 / 4	2–4
Monte-Carlo Masters	A	A	A	A	A	A	A	A	A	A	A	1R	NH	2R	Q1	A	A	0 / 2	1–2
Madrid Open	A	A	A	A	A	A	A	A	A	A	A	2R	NH	2R	A	A	A	0 / 2	2–2
Italian Open	A	A	A	A	A	A	A	A	A	A	A	1R	2R	2R	A	A	A	0 / 3	2–3
Canadian Open	A	A	A	A	A	A	A	A	1R	A	A	2R	NH	2R	A	A	A	0 / 3	2–3
Cincinnati Masters	A	A	A	A	A	A	A	A	2R	A	Q1	Q1	2R	A	Q1	A	A	0 / 2	2–2
Shanghai Masters	NH	A	A	A	A	A	A	A	Q2	A	Q1	2R	NH			A	A	0 / 1	1–1
Paris Masters	A	A	A	A	A	A	A	A	A	A	1R	Q1	1R	1R	A	A	A	0 / 3	0–3
Win–loss	0–0	0–0	0–0	0–0	0–0	0–0	0–0	0–0	3–4	0–0	1–2	3–7	2–3	5–6	1–2	0–0	0–0	0 / 24	15–24
Career statistics
	2008	2009	2010	2011	2012	2013	2014	2015	2016	2017	2018	2019	2020	2021	2022	2023	2024	Career	
Tournaments	0	0	1	1	1	4	0	9	21	5	19	27	14	25	15	2	0	144	
Titles	0	0	0	0	0	0	0	0	0	0	0	0	1	0	0	0	0	1	
Finals	0	0	0	0	0	0	0	0	0	0	1	1	1	0	0	0	0	3	
Overall win–loss	0–0	0–0	0–1	0–1	0–1	2–4	0–0	5–9	19–21	3–6	19–19	21–28	18–13	23–26	8–15	2–2	0–0	121–149	
Year-end ranking	564	307	204	541	199	190	156	92	84	128	38	48	38	72	150	483	-	45%	

=== Doubles ===
Tournament	2011	2012	2013	2014	2015	2016	2017	2018	2019	2020	2021	2022	2023	2024	SR	W–L
Grand Slam tournaments
Australian Open	1R	A	2R	A	1R	1R	A	1R	1R	1R	3R	1R	1R	2R	0 / 11	4–11
French Open	A	A	A	A	A	1R	A	2R	1R	1R	A	A	A	A	0 / 4	1–4
Wimbledon	A	A	A	A	A	A	A	1R	A	NH	A	A	A	A	0 / 1	0–1
US Open	A	A	A	A	A	A	2R	1R	1R	A	2R	A	A	A	0 / 4	2–4
Win–loss	0–1	0–0	1–1	0–0	0–1	0–2	1–1	1–4	0–3	0–2	3–2	0–1	0–1	1–1	0 / 20	7–20
National representation
Summer Olympics	NH	A	NH			A	NH				1R	NH		A	0 / 1	0–1
Career statistics
Tournaments	1	0	1	0	2	5	2	9	7	3	8	1	2	1	42	
Overall win–loss	0–1	0–0	1–1	0–0	1–2	0–5	3–2	4–9	1–7	0–3	6–8	0–1	0–2	1–1	17–42	
Year-end ranking	987	710	367	–	593	–	227	285	342	775	200	1077	–	–	29%	

== ATP career finals ==
=== Singles: 3 (1 title, 2 runner-ups) ===
Legend Grand Slam tournaments (0–0) ATP Tour Finals (0–0) ATP Tour Masters 1000 (0–0) ATP Tour 500 Series (0–1) ATP Tour 250 Series (1–1)	Finals by surface Hard (1–1) Clay (0–1) Grass (0–0)

Result	W–L	Date	Tournament	Tier	Surface	Opponent	Score
Loss	0–1	April 2018	Hungarian Open, Hungary	250 Series	Clay	(Italy) Marco Cecchinato	5–7, 4–6
Loss	0–2	Oct 2019	Japan Open, Tokyo	500 Series	Hard	(Serbia) Novak Djokovic	3–6, 2–6
Win	1–2	Nov 2020	Astana Open, Kazakhstan	250 Series	Hard (i)	(France) Adrian Mannarino	7–5, 6–1

== ATP Challenger and ITF Futures finals ==
=== Singles: 32 (19 titles, 13 runner-ups) ===
Legend ATP Challenger Tour (12–6) ITF Futures Tour (7–7)	Finals by surface Hard (15–9) Clay (1–4) Grass (1–0) Carpet (2–0)

Result	W–L	Date	Tournament	Tier	Surface	Opponent	Score
Loss	0–1	May 2008	Romania F1, Bucharest	Futures	Clay	(Romania) Răzvan Sabău	5–7, 3–6
Win	1–1	Oct 2008	Australia F8, Traralgon	Futures	Hard	(Australia) Andrew Coelho	6–2, 6–3
Loss	1–2	May 2009	Bulgaria F2, Stara Zagora	Futures	Clay	(North Macedonia) Predrag Rusevski	2–6, 3–6
Loss	1–3	Sep 2009	Australia F6, Darwin	Futures	Hard	(United Kingdom) Jamie Baker	4–6, 6–2, 3–6
Loss	1–4	Nov 2009	Australia F9, Esperance	Futures	Hard	(Australia) Matthew Ebden	3–6, 4–6
Win	2–4	Nov 2009	Australia F10, Kalgoorlie	Futures	Hard	(Australia) Matthew Ebden	6–2, 7–6^{(7–1)}
Win	3–4	Feb 2010	Australia F2, Berri	Futures	Grass	(Australia) Greg Jones	1–6, 6–4, 6–4
Loss	3–5	Apr 2010	Usa F9, Little Rock	Futures	Hard	(Australia) Brydan Klein	3–6, 6–3, 3–6
Win	4–5	Sep 2010	Australia F6, Darwin	Futures	Hard	(Japan) Hiroki Moriya	6–0, 6–1
Loss	4–6	Sep 2010	Australia F7, Alice Springs	Futures	Hard	(Australia) Colin Ebelthite	5–7, 6–7^{(2–7)}
Win	5–6	Oct 2010	Sacramento, United States	Challenger	Hard	(United States) Robert Kendrick	6–3, 6–2
Loss	5–7	Apr 2012	Australia F4, Bundaberg	Challenger	Clay	(Australia) Jason Kubler	4–6, 6–1, 1–6
Loss	5–8	May 2012	Busan, South Korea	Challenger	Hard	(Japan) Tatsuma Ito	4–6, 3–6
Win	6–8	Nov 2012	Australia F12, Bendigo	Futures	Hard	(Australia) Benjamin Mitchell	6–3, 6–3
Win	7–8	Jan 2013	Burnie, Australia	Challenger	Hard	(France) Stéphane Robert	6–2, 4–6, 6–0
Win	8–8	Mar 2013	Kyoto, Japan	Challenger	Carpet (i)	(Switzerland) Marco Chiudinelli	4–6, 6–4, 7–6^{(7–2)}
Win	9–8	Aug 2014	Korea F10, Chuncheon	Futures	Hard	(New Zealand) José Statham	6–3, 6–7^{(4–7)}, 7–6^{(7–5)}
Winner	10–8	Aug 2014	Korea F11, Anseong	Futures	Clay (i)	(New Zealand) José Statham	6–1, 7–5
Loss	10–9	Oct 2014	Tiburon, United States	Challenger	Hard	(United States) Sam Querrey	4–6, 2–6
Win	11–9	Nov 2014	Traralgon, Australia	Challenger	Hard	(United Kingdom) James Ward	6–4, 6–1
Win	12–9	Nov 2014	Yokohama, Japan	Challenger	Hard	(United Kingdom) Kyle Edmund	6–4, 6–4
Loss	12–10	Mar 2015	Kyoto, Japan	Challenger	Hard (i)	(Poland) Michał Przysiężny	3–6, 6–3, 3–6
Loss	12–11	May 2015	Vicenza, Italy	Challenger	Clay	(Spain) Íñigo Cervantes	4–6, 2–6
Win	13–11	Aug 2015	Lexington, United States	Challenger	Hard	(Japan) Yasutaka Uchiyama	6–3, 3–6, 6–4
Win	14–11	Aug 2015	Aptos Challenger, United States	Challenger	Hard	(United States) Austin Krajicek	7–5, 2–6, 6–3
Win	15–11	Nov 2015	Kobe Challenger, Japan	Challenger	Hard (i)	(Japan) Taro Daniel	6–1, 6–3
Loss	15–12	Aug 2017	Lexington, United States	Challenger	Hard	(United States) Michael Mmoh	4–6, 7–6^{(7–3)}, 3–6
Loss	15–13	Oct 2017	Ho Chi Minh City, Vietnam	Challenger	Hard	(Russia) Mikhail Youzhny	4–6, 4–6
Win	16–13	Nov 2017	Hua Hin, Thailand	Challenger	Hard	(Australia) Andrew Whittington	6–2, 6–2
Win	17–13	Feb 2018	Kyoto, Japan	Challenger	Carpet (i)	(Australia) Jordan Thompson	7–5, 6–1
Win	18–13	May 2018	Aix-en-Provence, France	Challenger	Clay	(Australia) Bernard Tomic	6–1, 6–2
Win	19–13	Sep 2019	Kaohsiung, Chinese Taipei	Challenger	Hard	(Australia) Marc Polmans	6–4, 6–2

== Junior singles finals ==
=== Singles: 3 (3 titles) ===
Legend
Grade 1–5 (3)

Result	W–L	Date	Tournament	Surface	Opponent	Score
Win	1–0	Jun 2006	Nouméa, New Caledonia	Hard	(Australia) Matheson Klein	6–2, 7–5
Win	2–0	Jun 2006	Lautoka, Fiji	Hard	(Australia) Brendan McKenzie	6–3, 6–2
Win	3–0	Jul 2006	Auckland, New Zealand	Hard	(Australia) Mark Verryth	4–6, 6–4, 6–2

== National representation ==
=== Davis Cup (3–3) ===
Round	Date	Opponent nation	Score	Location	Surface	Match	Opponent player	W/L	Rubber score
SF	Sep 2017	Belgium	2–3	Brussels	Clay (i)	Singles 1	David Goffin	Loss	7–6^{(7–4)}, 4–6, 3–6, 5–7
QR	Feb 2019	Bosnia and Herzegovina	4–0	Adelaide	Hard	Singles 1	Damir Džumhur	Win	6–3, 6–2
RR	Nov 2019	Canada	1–2	Madrid	Hard (i)	Singles 1	Vasek Pospisil	Loss	6–7^{(7–9)}, 4–6
QR	Mar 2020	Brazil	3–1	Adelaide	Hard	Singles 2	Thiago Seyboth Wild	Win	4–6, 7–6^{(7–0)}, 6–2
QR	Mar 2020	Brazil	3–1	Adelaide	Hard	Singles 3	Thiago Monteiro	Win	6–7^{(6–8)}, 7–6^{(7–3)}, 7–6^{(7–3)}
RR	Nov 2021	Hungary	2–1	Turin	Hard (i)	Singles 1	Zsombor Piros	Loss	6–4, 4–6, 3–6

=== ATP Cup (3–1) ===
Round	Date	Opponent nation	Score	Location	Surface	Match	Opponent player	W/L	Rubber score
RR	Jan 2020	Canada	3–0	Brisbane	Hard	Singles 1	Félix Auger-Aliassime	Win	6–4, 6–2
RR	Jan 2020	Greece	3–0	Brisbane	Hard	Singles 1	Michail Pervolarakis	Win	4–6, 6–1, 7–6^{(7–5)}
RR	Feb 2021	Spain	0–3	Melbourne	Hard	Singles 1	Pablo Carreño Busta	Loss	2–6, 4–6
RR	Feb 2021	Greece	2–1	Melbourne	Hard	Singles 1	Michail Pervolarakis	Win	6–2, 6–3

== Record against top 10 players ==
Millman's match record against players who have been ranked in the top 10, former #1 in bold. Only ATP Tour main-draw and Davis Cup matches are considered.

- (Spain) Tommy Robredo 3–1
- (United States) Frances Tiafoe 3–1
- (Poland) Hubert Hurkacz 2–0
- (France) Lucas Pouille 2–0
- (Spain) Fernando Verdasco 2–1
- (Latvia) Ernests Gulbis 1–0
- (United States) Jack Sock 1–0
- (Canada) Félix Auger-Aliassime 1–1
- (Italy) Fabio Fognini 1–1
- (France) Richard Gasquet 1–1
- (Russia) Karen Khachanov 1–1
- (France) Gilles Simon 1–1
- (Bulgaria) Grigor Dimitrov 1–2
- (Argentina) Diego Schwartzman 1–2
- (Switzerland) **Roger Federer** 1–3
- (Austria) Dominic Thiem 1–3
- (Spain) Pablo Carreño Busta 1–4
- (Italy) Matteo Berrettini 0–1
- (Argentina) Juan Martín del Potro 0–1
- (Spain) David Ferrer 0–1
- (Belgium) David Goffin 0–1
- (Russia) **Daniil Medvedev** 0–1
- (France) Gaël Monfils 0–1
- (United Kingdom) Cameron Norrie 0–1
- (Canada) Milos Raonic 0–1
- (Russia) Andrey Rublev 0–1
- (Norway) Casper Ruud 0–1
- (Canada) Denis Shapovalov 0–1
- (Italy) Jannik Sinner 0–1
- (Czech Republic) Radek Štěpánek 0–1
- (Greece) Stefanos Tsitsipas 0–1
- (Cyprus) Marcos Baghdatis 0–2
- (Croatia) Marin Čilić 0–2
- (United States) Taylor Fritz 0–2
- (United Kingdom) **Andy Murray** 0–2
- (Spain) **Rafael Nadal** 0–2
- (Japan) Kei Nishikori 0–2
- (Serbia) **Novak Djokovic** 0–3
- (Germany) Alexander Zverev 0–3
- (Australia) Alex de Minaur 0–4
- (United States) John Isner 0–4
- (Spain) Roberto Bautista Agut 0–6

* As of 8 January 2024

== Wins over top 10 players ==
- He has a 1–22 record against players who were, at the time the match was played, ranked in the top 10.

#	Player	Rank	Event	Surface	Rd	Score	JMR
2018
1.	(Switzerland) Roger Federer	2	US Open, United States	Hard	4R	3–6, 7–5, 7–6^{(9–7)}, 7–6^{(7–3)}	55

== Records ==
- These records were attained in the Open Era of tennis.

Tournament	Year	Record accomplished	Player/s tied
Rio Olympics	2016	Double-bagel win (6–0, 6–0) at a Summer Olympics	Zheng Qinwen

== See also ==
- List of Australia Davis Cup team representatives
- Australia Davis Cup team
- Tennis at the 2016 Summer Olympics
- Tennis at the 2020 Summer Olympics
