= Open du Pays d'Aix =

Open Aix Provence
- 2025 Open Aix Provence

ATP Challenger Tour
- Event name: Open Aix Provence Crédit Agricole (2023-); Open du Pays d'Aix (2014-2022)
- Location: Aix-en-Provence, France
- Venue: Country Club Aixois
- Category: ATP Challenger 175 (2023-)
- Surface: Clay
- Draw: 28S/16Q/16D
- Prize money: €272,720 (2026), 227,270+H (2025)
- Website: Website

The Open Aix Provence Crédit Agricole is a tennis tournament held in Aix-en-Provence, France since 2014. The event is played on outdoor clay courts and is part of the ATP Challenger Tour 175 since 2023.

Diego Schwartzman and Robin Haase were the only two tennis players to win both singles and doubles titles in the same year.

== Past finals ==
=== Singles ===
Year	Champion	Runner-up	Score
2026	(Chile) Alejandro Tabilo (2)	(Belgium) Zizou Bergs	6–4, 4–6, 6–3
2025	(Croatia) Borna Ćorić	(Switzerland) Stan Wawrinka	6–7^{(5–7)}, 6–3, 7–6^{(7–4)}
2024	(Chile) Alejandro Tabilo	(Spain) Jaume Munar	6–3, 6–2
2023	(United Kingdom) Andy Murray	(United States) Tommy Paul	2–6, 6–1, 6–2
2022	(France) Benjamin Bonzi	(France) Grégoire Barrère	6–2, 6–4
2021	(Spain) Carlos Taberner	(France) Manuel Guinard	6–2, 6–2
2020	(Germany) Oscar Otte	(Brazil) Thiago Seyboth Wild	6–2, 6–7^{(4–7)}, 6–4
2019	(Uruguay) Pablo Cuevas	(France) Quentin Halys	7–5, 3–6, 6–2
2018	(Australia) John Millman	(Australia) Bernard Tomic	6–1, 6–2
2017	(United States) Frances Tiafoe	(France) Jérémy Chardy	6–3, 4–6, 7–6^{(7–5)}
2016	(Brazil) Thiago Monteiro	(Argentina) Carlos Berlocq	4–6, 6–4, 6–1
2015	(Netherlands) Robin Haase	(France) Paul-Henri Mathieu	7–6^{(7–1)}, 6–2
2014	(Argentina) Diego Schwartzman	(Germany) Andreas Beck	6–7^{(4–7)}, 6–3, 6–2

=== Doubles ===
Year	Champions	Runners-up	Score
2026	(United States) Robert Cash (United States) JJ Tracy (2)	(United States) Vasil Kirkov (Netherlands) Bart Stevens	5–7, 6–4, [10–4]
2025	(United States) Robert Cash (United States) JJ Tracy	(France) Théo Arribagé (Monaco) Hugo Nys	7–5, 7–6^{(7–5)}
2024	(United Kingdom) Luke Johnson (Tunisia) Skander Mansouri	(Ecuador) Diego Hidalgo (Colombia) Cristian Rodríguez	6–3, 6–3
2023	(Australia) Jason Kubler (Australia) John Peers	(Portugal) Nuno Borges (Portugal) Francisco Cabral	6–7^{(5–7)}, 6–4, [10–7]
2022	(France) Titouan Droguet (France) Kyrian Jacquet	(Colombia) Nicolás Barrientos (Mexico) Miguel Ángel Reyes-Varela	6–2, 6–3
2021	(France) Sadio Doumbia (France) Fabien Reboul	(United States) Robert Galloway (United States) Alex Lawson	6–7^{(4–7)}, 7–5, [10–4]
2020	(Argentina) Andrés Molteni (Monaco) Hugo Nys	(Uruguay) Ariel Behar (Ecuador) Gonzalo Escobar	6–4, 7–6^{(7–4)}
2019	(Germany) Kevin Krawietz (Austria) Jürgen Melzer	(Denmark) Frederik Nielsen (Germany) Tim Pütz	7–6^{(7–5)}, 6–2
2018	(Germany) Philipp Petzschner (Germany) Tim Pütz	(Argentina) Guido Andreozzi (France) Kenny de Schepper	6–7^{(3–7)}, 6–2, [10–8]
2017	(Netherlands) Wesley Koolhof (Netherlands) Matwé Middelkoop	(Germany) Andre Begemann (France) Jérémy Chardy	2–6, 6–4, [16–14]
2016	(Austria) Oliver Marach (Austria) Philipp Oswald	(Argentina) Guillermo Durán (Argentina) Máximo González	6–1, 4–6, [10–7]
2015	(Netherlands) Robin Haase (Pakistan) Aisam-ul-Haq Qureshi	(United States) Nicholas Monroe (New Zealand) Artem Sitak	6–1, 6–2
2014	(Argentina) Diego Schwartzman (Argentina) Horacio Zeballos	(Germany) Andreas Beck (Austria) Martin Fischer	6–4, 3–6, [10–5]
