= 2025 Open Aix Provence – Singles =

Singles
- 2025 Open Aix Provence

Final
- Champion: (Croatia) Borna Ćorić
- Runner-up: (Switzerland) Stan Wawrinka
- Score: 6–7^{(5–7)}, 6–3, 7–6^{(7–4)}

Events
Singles	Doubles
← 2024 ·	Open Aix Provence	· 2026 →

Alejandro Tabilo was the defending champion but chose not to defend his title.

Borna Ćorić won the title after defeating Stan Wawrinka 6–7^{(5–7)}, 6–3, 7–6^{(7–4)} in the final.

== Seeds ==
The top four seeds received a bye into the second round.

1. (Australia) Alexei Popyrin (second round)
2. (Italy) Luciano Darderi (second round)
3. (France) Quentin Halys (second round)
4. (Spain) Jaume Munar (second round)
5. (Italy) Mattia Bellucci (first round)
6. (France) Arthur Rinderknech (second round)
7. (France) Hugo Gaston (first round, retired)
8. (France) Corentin Moutet (second round)

== Draw ==
=== Key ===
- Q = Qualifier
- WC = Wild card
- LL = Lucky loser
- Alt = Alternate
- ITF = ITF entry
- PR = Protected ranking
- SR = Special ranking
- SE = Special exempt
- JE = Junior exempt
- JR = Junior Accelerator Programme entrant
- CO = College Accelerator Programme entrant
- NG = Next Gen Accelerator Program entrant
- w/o = Walkover
- r = Retired
- d = Defaulted

=== Finals ===
Semifinals
WC	(Switzerland) Stan Wawrinka	6	6
PR	(Croatia) Borna Gojo	4	4
(Croatia) Borna Ćorić	4	6	6
Q	(Peru) Ignacio Buse	6	2	3

Final
WC	(Switzerland) Stan Wawrinka	7^{7}	3	6^{4}
(Croatia) Borna Ćorić	6^{5}	6	7^{7}

=== Top half ===
First round
WC	(Switzerland) S Wawrinka	6	6
Alt	(France) U Blanchet	4	3
(United States) N Basavareddy	7	7^{7}
Alt	(Finland) O Virtanen	5	6^{3}
Q	(Spain) A Ramos Viñolas	6	6
5	(Italy) M Bellucci	2	2
WC	(France) A Géa	5	3
Q	(Monaco) V Vacherot	7	6
(Colombia) DE Galán	6	6
(United Kingdom) B Harris	2	2
PR	(Croatia) B Gojo	7^{7}	2
7	(France) H Gaston	6^{4}	1^{r}

Second round
1	(Australia) A Popyrin	3	6	1
WC	(Switzerland) S Wawrinka	6	3	6
(United States) N Basavareddy	7	7
Q	(Spain) A Ramos Viñolas	5	5
4	(Spain) J Munar	6^{2}	2
Q	(Monaco) V Vacherot	7^{7}	6
(Colombia) DE Galán	6	6^{5}	5
PR	(Croatia) B Gojo	4	7^{7}	7

Quarterfinals
WC	(Switzerland) S Wawrinka	7^{10}	6
(United States) N Basavareddy	6^{8}	3
Q	(Monaco) V Vacherot	2	3
PR	(Croatia) B Gojo	6	6

Semifinals
WC	(Switzerland) S Wawrinka	6	6
PR	(Croatia) B Gojo	4	4

=== Bottom half ===
First round
6	(France) A Rinderknech	6	6^{3}	6
Q	(Estonia) M Lajal	4	7^{7}	3
Alt	(France) P-H Herbert	2	7^{9}	1
(Croatia) B Ćorić	6	6^{7}	6
(Argentina) M Navone	7^{7}	6
Alt	(France) G Barrère	6^{3}	0
8	(France) C Moutet	7	3	7
Alt	P Kotov	5	6	5
Alt	(France) K Jacquet	6	3	2
(United States) R Opelka	4	6	6
Q	(Peru) I Buse	6	6
WC	(France) M Kouamé	2	4

Second round
6	(France) A Rinderknech	6^{3}	4
(Croatia) B Ćorić	7^{7}	6
(Argentina) M Navone	6	6
3	(France) Q Halys	2	4
8	(France) C Moutet	6^{3}	6^{3}
(United States) R Opelka	7^{7}	7^{7}
Q	(Peru) I Buse	6	6
2	(Italy) L Darderi	0	4

Quarterfinals
(Croatia) B Ćorić	7	6
(Argentina) M Navone	5	4
(United States) R Opelka	6^{4}	3^{r}
Q	(Peru) I Buse	7^{7}	2

Semifinals
(Croatia) B Ćorić	4	6	6
Q	(Peru) I Buse	6	2	3
