= 2021 Andalucía Challenger =

- Date: 29 March – 3 April
- Edition: 4th
- Surface: Clay
- Location: Marbella, Spain

Champions

Singles
- (Italy) Gianluca Mager

Doubles
- (United Kingdom) Dominic Inglot / (Australia) Matt Reid
| ← 2020 · | Andalucía Challenger | · 2022 → |

The 2021 Andalucía Challenger was a professional tennis tournament played on clay courts. It was the fourth edition of the tournament which was part of the 2021 ATP Challenger Tour. It took place in Marbella, Spain between 29 March and 3 April 2021.

== Singles main-draw entrants ==
=== Seeds ===
| Country | Player | Rank^{1} | Seed |
|---|---|---|---|
| ESP | Roberto Carballés Baena | 96 | 1 |
| SVK | Norbert Gombos | 98 | 2 |
| ESP | Jaume Munar | 99 | 3 |
| ITA | Gianluca Mager | 102 | 4 |
| POR | Pedro Sousa | 111 | 5 |
| JPN | Taro Daniel | 118 | 6 |
| BIH | Damir Džumhur | 126 | 7 |
| RUS | Evgeny Donskoy | 128 | 8 |

- ^{1} Rankings are as of 23 March 2021.

=== Other entrants ===
The following players received wildcards into the singles main draw:

- (Sweden) Leo Borg
- (Spain) Carlos Gimeno Valero
- (Spain) Carlos Gómez-Herrera

The following player received entry into the singles main draw using a protected ranking:

- (Russia) Andrey Kuznetsov

The following players received entry into the singles main draw as alternates:

- (France) Maxime Janvier
- (Spain) Mario Vilella Martínez
- (Sweden) Elias Ymer

The following players received entry from the qualifying draw:

- (Spain) Javier Barranco Cosano
- (Czech Republic) Vít Kopřiva
- (Spain) Nikolás Sánchez Izquierdo
- (Spain) Carlos Sánchez Jover

== Champions ==
=== Singles ===
- (Italy) Gianluca Mager def. (Spain) Jaume Munar 2–6, 6–3, 6–2.

=== Doubles ===
- (United Kingdom) Dominic Inglot / (Australia) Matt Reid def. (Monaco) Romain Arneodo / (Monaco) Hugo Nys 1–6, 6–3, [10–6].
