= 2019 Grand Prix Hassan II – Singles =

Singles
- 2019 Grand Prix Hassan II

Final
- Champion: (France) Benoît Paire
- Runner-up: (Spain) Pablo Andújar
- Score: 6–2, 6–3

Details
- Draw: 32 (4 Q / 3 WC )
- Seeds: 8

Events
Singles	Doubles
- Grand Prix Hassan II

Benoît Paire defeated defending champion Pablo Andújar in the final, 6–2, 6–3, to win the singles tennis title at the 2019 Grand Prix Hassan II. The win earned Paire his second career Association of Tennis Professionals (ATP) singles title, his first in four years. Andújar saw his 13-match winning streak snapped in the loss after he had won two consecutive ATP Challenger Tour titles in Marbella and Alicante in the two weeks prior to the tournament.

== Seeds ==
1. (Germany) Alexander Zverev (second round)
2. (Italy) Fabio Fognini (first round)
3. (United Kingdom) Kyle Edmund (second round)
4. (France) Gilles Simon (semifinals)
5. (Serbia) Laslo Đere (first round)
6. (Spain) Fernando Verdasco (first round)
7. (Germany) Philipp Kohlschreiber (second round)
8. (France) Pierre-Hugues Herbert (second round)

== Draw ==
Key

- Q = Qualifier
- WC = Wild card
- LL = Lucky loser
- Alt = Alternate
- ITF = ITF entry
- PR = Protected ranking
- SR = Special ranking
- SE = Special exempt
- JE = Junior exempt
- JR = Junior Accelerator Programme entrant
- CO = College Accelerator Programme entrant
- NG = Next Gen Accelerator Program entrant
- w/o = Walkover
- r = Retired
- d = Defaulted

=== Finals ===
Semifinals
(France) Benoît Paire	2	6	6
WC	(France) Jo-Wilfried Tsonga	6	4	3
4	(France) Gilles Simon	1	1
(Spain) Pablo Andújar	6	6

Final
(France) Benoît Paire	6	6
(Spain) Pablo Andújar	2	3

=== Top half ===
First round
1/WC	(Germany) A Zverev	6	6
(Uzbekistan) D Istomin	4	4
Q	(Argentina) F Bagnis	1	6^{3}
(Spain) J Munar	6	7^{7}
(Slovenia) A Bedene	6	4	5
(France) B Paire	3	6	7
(Italy) T Fabbiano	7^{7}	4	1
8	(France) P-H Herbert	6^{3}	6	6
3	(United Kingdom) K Edmund	6	6
(France) U Humbert	3	2
WC	(France) J-W Tsonga	6	7^{7}
PR	(Germany) C-M Stebe	1	6^{3}
(Tunisia) M Jaziri	3	4
(Netherlands) R Haase	6	6
Q	(Italy) L Sonego	6	6
5	(Serbia) L Đere	3	3

Second round
1/WC	(Germany) A Zverev	6^{1}	6	3
(Spain) J Munar	7^{7}	2	6
(France) B Paire	6	6
8	(France) P-H Herbert	4	2
3	(United Kingdom) K Edmund	6^{6}	3
WC	(France) J-W Tsonga	7^{8}	6
(Netherlands) R Haase	6^{5}	3
Q	(Italy) L Sonego	7^{7}	6

Quarterfinals
(Spain) J Munar	1	3
(France) B Paire	6	6
WC	(France) J-W Tsonga	6	6
Q	(Italy) L Sonego	3	2

Semifinals
(France) B Paire	2	6	6
WC	(France) J-W Tsonga	6	4	3

=== Bottom half ===
First round
6	(Spain) F Verdasco	7	2	2
Q	(Spain) A Menéndez Maceiras	5	6	6
(Japan) T Daniel	6	6
(Germany) M Zverev	3	0
(Spain) A Ramos Viñolas	3	6^{5}
(Argentina) G Andreozzi	6	7^{7}
(Slovakia) J Kovalík	4	1
4	(France) G Simon	6	6
7	(Germany) P Kohlschreiber	7^{7}	7
Q	(Spain) A Davidovich Fokina	6^{4}	5
(Argentina) F Delbonis	6^{6}	3
(Spain) P Andújar	7^{8}	6
(Argentina) JI Londero	6	6
LL	(Argentina) C Berlocq	2	4
(Czech Republic) J Veselý	7^{7}	6
2/WC	(Italy) F Fognini	6^{2}	4

Second round
Q	(Spain) A Menéndez Maceiras	2	6	1
(Japan) T Daniel	6	1	6
(Argentina) G Andreozzi	2	2
4	(France) G Simon	6	6
7	(Germany) P Kohlschreiber	6^{6}	4
(Spain) P Andújar	7^{8}	6
(Argentina) JI Londero	3	4
(Czech Republic) J Veselý	6	6

Quarterfinals
(Japan) T Daniel	4	5
4	(France) G Simon	6	7
(Spain) P Andújar	w/o
(Czech Republic) J Veselý

Semifinals
4	(France) G Simon	1	1
(Spain) P Andújar	6	6

== Qualifying ==
=== Seeds ===
1. (Italy) Lorenzo Sonego (qualified)
2. (Sweden) Elias Ymer(qualifying competition)
3. (France) Grégoire Barrère (first round)
4. (France) Corentin Moutet (first round)
5. (Spain) Adrián Menéndez Maceiras (qualified)
6. (Argentina) Facundo Bagnis (qualified)
7. (Argentina) Carlos Berlocq (qualifying competition, lucky loser)
8. (Germany) Yannick Hanfmann (withdrew)

=== Qualifiers ===
1. (Italy) Lorenzo Sonego
2. (Argentina) Facundo Bagnis
3. (Spain) Alejandro Davidovich Fokina
4. (Spain) Adrián Menéndez Maceiras

=== Lucky loser ===
1. (Argentina) Carlos Berlocq

=== Qualifying draw ===
==== First qualifier ====
First round
1	(Italy) Lorenzo Sonego	7^{7}	6
(Russia) Alexey Vatutin	6^{4}	4
WC	(Switzerland) Adam Moundir	1	2
7	(Argentina) Carlos Berlocq	6	6

Qualifying competition
1	(Italy) Lorenzo Sonego	6	7
7	(Argentina) Carlos Berlocq	4	5

==== Second qualifier ====
First round
2	(Sweden) Elias Ymer	7^{7}	6
(Germany) Kevin Krawietz	6^{2}	4
(Serbia) Viktor Troicki	6^{5}	4
6	(Argentina) Facundo Bagnis	7^{7}	6

Qualifying competition
2	(Sweden) Elias Ymer	6	3	5
6	(Argentina) Facundo Bagnis	1	6	7

==== Third qualifier ====
First round
3	(France) Grégoire Barrère	5	6	4
(Spain) Alejandro Davidovich Fokina	7	3	6
(Russia) Evgeny Karlovskiy	7^{7}	4	6
Alt	(Germany) Tim Pütz	6^{2}	6	2

Qualifying competition
(Spain) Alejandro Davidovich Fokina	6	6
(Russia) Evgeny Karlovskiy	2	2

==== Fourth qualifier ====
First round
4	(France) Corentin Moutet	3	6^{6}
(France) Elliot Benchetrit	6	7^{8}
WC	(Morocco) Lamine Ouahab	6^{5}	7^{7}	4
5	(Spain) Adrián Menéndez Maceiras	7^{7}	6^{1}	6

Qualifying competition
(France) Elliot Benchetrit	5	5
5	(Spain) Adrián Menéndez Maceiras	7	7
