= 2018 Casino Admiral Trophy – Singles =

Singles
- 2018 Casino Admiral Trophy

Final
- Champion: (Italy) Stefano Travaglia
- Runner-up: (Argentina) Guido Andreozzi
- Score: 6–3, 6–3

Events
Singles	Doubles
Casino Admiral Trophy	· 2019 →

This was the first edition of the tournament.

Stefano Travaglia won the title after defeating Guido Andreozzi 6–3, 6–3 in the final.

== Seeds ==
1. (Spain) Roberto Carballés Baena (second round)
2. (Serbia) Laslo Đere (first round)
3. (Italy) Marco Cecchinato (semifinals)
4. (Spain) Adrián Menéndez Maceiras (first round)
5. (Portugal) Pedro Sousa (first round)
6. (Slovakia) Andrej Martin (first round)
7. (Italy) Stefano Travaglia (champion)
8. (Spain) Marcel Granollers (first round)

== Draw ==
=== Key ===
- Q = Qualifier
- WC = Wild card
- LL = Lucky loser
- Alt = Alternate
- SE = Special exempt
- PR = Protected ranking
- ITF = ITF entry
- JE = Junior exempt
- w/o = Walkover
- r = Retired
- d = Defaulted
- SR = Special ranking

=== Finals ===
Semifinals
7	(Italy) Stefano Travaglia	7^{7}	6
(Slovakia) Martin Kližan	6^{5}	0
3	(Italy) Marco Cecchinato	3	3
(Argentina) Guido Andreozzi	6	6

Final
7	(Italy) Stefano Travaglia	6	6
(Argentina) Guido Andreozzi	3	3

=== Top half ===
First round
1	(Spain) R Carballés Baena	6	6
WC	(Spain) P Martínez	3	4
Q	(Argentina) P Cachin	6	0	4
Q	(Belgium) K Coppejans	4	6	6
(Germany) D Brown	4	2
Alt	(Spain) E López Pérez	6	6
(Spain) J Munar	7^{7}	2	5
7	(Italy) S Travaglia	6^{5}	6	7
4	(Spain) A Menéndez Maceiras	3	4
(Slovakia) M Kližan	6	6
WC	(Australia) A Popyrin	7^{7}	6
(Spain) R Ojeda Lara	6^{5}	4
(Slovakia) N Gombos	3	3
WC	(Spain) A Davidovich Fokina	6	6
Q	(Argentina) M Trungelliti	6	6
5	(Portugal) P Sousa	3	2

Second round
1	(Spain) R Carballés Baena	3	6^{5}
Q	(Belgium) K Coppejans	6	7^{7}
Alt	(Spain) E López Pérez	2	4
7	(Italy) S Travaglia	6	6
(Slovakia) M Kližan	6	7
WC	(Australia) A Popyrin	4	5
WC	(Spain) A Davidovich Fokina	3	3
Q	(Argentina) M Trungelliti	6	6

Quarterfinals
Q	(Belgium) K Coppejans	5	6	4
7	(Italy) S Travaglia	7	2	6
(Slovakia) M Kližan	6	6
Q	(Argentina) M Trungelliti	1	2

Semifinals
7	(Italy) S Travaglia	7^{7}	6
(Slovakia) M Kližan	6^{5}	0

=== Bottom half ===
First round
8	(Spain) M Granollers	4	1
LL	(India) S Nagal	6	6
(India) R Ramanathan	6	3	6
(Italy) A Giannessi	4	6	3
(Spain) T Robredo	4	1
(Austria) S Ofner	6	6
WC	(Austria) J Melzer	1	6^{1}
3	(Italy) M Cecchinato	6	7^{7}
6	(Slovakia) A Martin	6	0	1
(Italy) S Bolelli	1	6	6
(Portugal) J Domingues	2	3
(Slovakia) J Kovalík	6	6
(Argentina) G Andreozzi	6	6
Q	(Czech Republic) L Rosol	3	4
(Latvia) E Gulbis	7	4	6
2	(Serbia) L Đere	5	6	4

Second round
LL	(India) S Nagal	2	3
(India) R Ramanathan	6	6
(Austria) S Ofner	6	6^{3}	2
3	(Italy) M Cecchinato	4	7^{7}	6
(Italy) S Bolelli	2	6	6
(Slovakia) J Kovalík	6	4	4
(Argentina) G Andreozzi	7	6
(Latvia) E Gulbis	5	1

Quarterfinals
(India) R Ramanathan	1	4
3	(Italy) M Cecchinato	6	6
(Italy) S Bolelli	6	0	3
(Argentina) G Andreozzi	3	6	6

Semifinals
3	(Italy) M Cecchinato	3	3
(Argentina) G Andreozzi	6	6
