= 2019 Casino Admiral Trophy =

- Date: 25–31 March
- Edition: 2nd
- Surface: Clay
- Location: Marbella, Spain

Champions

Singles
- (Spain) Pablo Andújar

Doubles
- (Germany) Kevin Krawietz / (Germany) Andreas Mies
← 2018 ·	Casino Admiral Trophy	· 2020 →

The 2019 Casino Admiral Trophy was a professional tennis tournament played on clay courts. It was the second edition of the tournament which was part of the 2019 ATP Challenger Tour. It took place in Marbella, Spain between 25 and 31 March 2019.

== Singles main-draw entrants ==
=== Seeds ===
Country	Player	Rank^{1}	Seed
FRA	Benoît Paire	67	1
ESP	Pablo Andújar	88	2
CZE	Jiří Veselý	100	3
POR	Pedro Sousa	105	4
ESP	Guillermo García López	112	5
BRA	Thiago Monteiro	117	6
ESP	Adrián Menéndez Maceiras	141	7
ARG	Facundo Bagnis	142	8
ITA	Simone Bolelli	147	9
ESP	Pedro Martínez	158	10
ITA	Filippo Baldi	162	11
ITA	Alessandro Giannessi	166	12
ITA	Andrea Arnaboldi	174	13
GER	Rudolf Molleker	180	14
ESP	Alejandro Davidovich Fokina	181	15
BEL	Kimmer Coppejans	183	16

- ^{1} Rankings are as of 18 March 2019.

=== Other entrants ===
The following players received wildcards into the singles main draw:

- (Spain) Javier Barranco Cosano
- (Serbia) Marko Djokovic
- (Spain) Carlos Gómez-Herrera
- (Austria) Jürgen Melzer
- (Spain) Carlos Taberner

The following player received entry into the singles main draw as an alternate:

- (Dominican Republic) José Hernández-Fernández

The following players received entry into the singles main draw using their ITF World Tennis Ranking:

- (Italy) Raúl Brancaccio
- (Germany) Peter Heller
- (Spain) David Pérez Sanz
- (Spain) Oriol Roca Batalla

The following players received entry from the qualifying draw:

- (Italy) Riccardo Bonadio
- (Canada) Steven Diez

== Champions ==
=== Singles ===
- (Spain) Pablo Andújar def. (France) Benoît Paire 4–6, 7–6^{(8–6)}, 6–4.

=== Doubles ===
- (Germany) Kevin Krawietz / (Germany) Andreas Mies def. (Belgium) Sander Gillé / (Belgium) Joran Vliegen 7–6^{(8–6)}, 2–6, [10–6].
