= 2018 Casino Admiral Trophy =

- Date: 26–31 March
- Edition: 1st
- Surface: Clay
- Location: Marbella, Spain

Champions

Singles
- (Italy) Stefano Travaglia

Doubles
- (Argentina) Guido Andreozzi / (Uruguay) Ariel Behar
Casino Admiral Trophy	· 2019 →

The 2018 Casino Admiral Trophy was a professional tennis tournament played on clay courts. It was the first edition of the tournament which was part of the 2018 ATP Challenger Tour. It took place in Marbella, Spain between 26 and 31 March 2018.

== Singles main-draw entrants ==
=== Seeds ===
Country	Player	Rank^{1}	Seed
ESP	Roberto Carballés Baena	78	1
SRB	Laslo Đere	94	2
ITA	Marco Cecchinato	97	3
ESP	Adrián Menéndez Maceiras	112	4
POR	Pedro Sousa	119	5
SVK	Andrej Martin	121	6
ITA	Stefano Travaglia	123	7
ESP	Marcel Granollers	131	8

- ^{1} Rankings are as of 19 March 2018.

=== Other entrants ===
The following players received wildcards into the singles main draw:

- (Spain) Alejandro Davidovich Fokina
- (Spain) Pedro Martínez
- (Austria) Jürgen Melzer
- (Australia) Alexei Popyrin

The following player received entry into the singles main draw as an alternate:

- (Spain) Enrique López Pérez

The following players received entry from the qualifying draw:

- (Argentina) Pedro Cachin
- (Belgium) Kimmer Coppejans
- (Czech Republic) Lukáš Rosol
- (Argentina) Marco Trungelliti

The following player received entry as a lucky loser:

- (India) Sumit Nagal

== Champions ==
=== Singles ===
- (Italy) Stefano Travaglia def. (Argentina) Guido Andreozzi 6–3, 6–3.

=== Doubles ===
- (Argentina) Guido Andreozzi / (Uruguay) Ariel Behar def. (Slovakia) Martin Kližan / (Slovakia) Jozef Kovalík 6–3, 6–4.
