= 2019 Casino Admiral Trophy – Doubles =

Doubles
- 2019 Casino Admiral Trophy

Final
- Champions: (Germany) Kevin Krawietz (Germany) Andreas Mies
- Runners-up: (Belgium) Sander Gillé (Belgium) Joran Vliegen
- Score: 7–6^{(8–6)}, 2–6, [10–6]

Events
Singles	Doubles
← 2018 ·	Casino Admiral Trophy	· 2020 →

Guido Andreozzi and Ariel Behar were the defending champions but only Behar chose to defend his title, partnering Thiago Monteiro. Behar lost in the first round to David Pérez Sanz and Oriol Roca Batalla.

Kevin Krawietz and Andreas Mies won the title after defeating Sander Gillé and Joran Vliegen 7–6^{(8–6)}, 2–6, [10–6] in the final.

== Seeds ==
1. (Germany) Kevin Krawietz / (Germany) Andreas Mies (champions)
2. (United Kingdom) Jonny O'Mara / (United Kingdom) Ken Skupski (quarterfinals)
3. (India) Jeevan Nedunchezhiyan / (India) Purav Raja (quarterfinals)
4. (Belgium) Sander Gillé / (Belgium) Joran Vliegen (final)

== Draw ==
=== Key ===
- Q = Qualifier
- WC = Wild card
- LL = Lucky loser
- Alt = Alternate
- SE = Special exempt
- PR = Protected ranking
- ITF = ITF entry
- JE = Junior exempt
- w/o = Walkover
- r = Retired
- d = Defaulted
- SR = Special ranking

First round
1	(Germany) K Krawietz (Germany) A Mies	6	6
WC	(Serbia) M Djokovic (Spain) C Gómez-Herrera	1	3
(United States) H Reese (Brazil) F Romboli	3	3
(Argentina) F Bagnis (Argentina) G Durán	6	6
3	(India) J Nedunchezhiyan (India) P Raja	7	6
ITF	(Italy) R Bonadio (Germany) Peter Heller	5	2
ITF	(Spain) D Pérez Sanz (Spain) O Roca Batalla	7	6
(Uruguay) A Behar (Brazil) T Monteiro	5	4
(Spain) G Granollers (Spain) P Martínez	6	5	[5]
Alt	(Belgium) K Coppejans (Italy) GM Moroni	4	7	[10]
WC	(Spain) A Menéndez Maceiras (Spain) T Robredo	6^{5}	6	[6]
4	(Belgium) S Gillé (Belgium) J Vliegen	7^{7}	2	[10]
(Brazil) F Neis (Spain) D Vega Hernández	6	6^{3}	[10]
WC	(Germany) R Molleker (Austria) J Rodionov	4	7^{7}	[8]
(Switzerland) L Margaroli (Portugal) P Sousa	1	2
2	(United Kingdom) J O'Mara (United Kingdom) K Skupski	6	6

Quarterfinals
1	(Germany) K Krawietz (Germany) A Mies	6	5	[10]
(Argentina) F Bagnis (Argentina) G Durán	3	7	[8]
3	(India) J Nedunchezhiyan (India) P Raja	6	2	[3]
ITF	(Spain) D Pérez Sanz (Spain) O Roca Batalla	4	6	[10]
Alt	(Belgium) K Coppejans (Italy) GM Moroni	4	4
4	(Belgium) S Gillé (Belgium) J Vliegen	6	6
(Brazil) F Neis (Spain) D Vega Hernández	6	7^{10}
2	(United Kingdom) J O'Mara (United Kingdom) K Skupski	2	6^{8}

Semifinals
1	(Germany) K Krawietz (Germany) A Mies	7	6
ITF	(Spain) D Pérez Sanz (Spain) O Roca Batalla	5	1
4	(Belgium) S Gillé (Belgium) J Vliegen	6	6
(Brazil) F Neis (Spain) D Vega Hernández	3	4

Final
1	(Germany) K Krawietz (Germany) A Mies	7^{8}	2	[10]
4	(Belgium) S Gillé (Belgium) J Vliegen	6^{6}	6	[6]
