= 2024 Open Aix Provence – Doubles =

Doubles
- 2024 Open Aix Provence

Final
- Champions: (United Kingdom) Luke Johnson (Tunisia) Skander Mansouri
- Runners-up: (Ecuador) Diego Hidalgo (Colombia) Cristian Rodríguez
- Score: 6–3, 6–3

Events
Singles	Doubles
← 2023 ·	Open Aix Provence	· 2025 →

Jason Kubler and John Peers were the defending champions but chose not to defend their title.

Luke Johnson and Skander Mansouri won the title after defeating Diego Hidalgo and Cristian Rodríguez 6–3, 6–3 in the final.

== Seeds ==
1. (Finland) Harri Heliövaara / (United Kingdom) Henry Patten (quarterfinals)
2. (Netherlands) Sander Arends / (Netherlands) Matwé Middelkoop (first round)
3. (France) Théo Arribagé / (Romania) Victor Vlad Cornea (first round)
4. (Ecuador) Diego Hidalgo / (Colombia) Cristian Rodríguez (final)

== Draw ==
Key

- Q = Qualifier
- WC = Wild card
- LL = Lucky loser
- Alt = Alternate
- ITF = ITF entry
- PR = Protected ranking
- SR = Special ranking
- SE = Special exempt
- JE = Junior exempt
- JR = Junior Accelerator Programme entrant
- CO = College Accelerator Programme entrant
- NG = Next Gen Accelerator Program entrant
- w/o = Walkover
- r = Retired
- d = Defaulted

=== Draw ===
First round
1	(Finland) H Heliövaara (United Kingdom) H Patten	6	7^{7}
(Spain) P Martínez (Spain) S Martos Gornés	1	6^{3}
(United Kingdom) L Johnson (Tunisia) S Mansouri	7	6
WC	(France) L Lokoli (Finland) O Virtanen	5	1
3	(France) T Arribagé (Romania) V Cornea	4	6	[9]
WC	(France) G Debru (France) G Jacq	6	3	[11]
(France) J Eysseric (France) H Mayot	7^{7}	6
(Germany) J Schnaitter (Germany) M Wallner	6^{2}	0
(France) A Müller (France) L Sanchez	3	6	[11]
(Chile) A Tabilo (Spain) D Vega Hernández	6	3	[9]
(Poland) K Drzewiecki (Switzerland) L Margaroli	6^{9}	3
4	(Ecuador) D Hidalgo (Colombia) C Rodríguez	7^{11}	6
(Brazil) R Matos (Brazil) F Meligeni Alves	6	6
(Brazil) M Demoliner; R Safiullin	4	4
(Sweden) A Göransson (Netherlands) S Verbeek	7^{8}	3	[15]
2	(Netherlands) S Arends (Netherlands) M Middelkoop	6^{6}	6	[13]

Quarterfinals
1	(Finland) H Heliövaara (United Kingdom) H Patten	7^{7}	3	[8]
(United Kingdom) L Johnson (Tunisia) S Mansouri	6^{3}	6	[10]
WC	(France) G Debru (France) G Jacq	6	3	[12]
(France) J Eysseric (France) H Mayot	2	6	[10]
(France) A Müller (France) L Sanchez	4	4
4	(Ecuador) D Hidalgo (Colombia) C Rodríguez	6	6
(Brazil) R Matos (Brazil) F Meligeni Alves	2	4
(Sweden) A Göransson (Netherlands) S Verbeek	6	6

Semifinals
(United Kingdom) L Johnson (Tunisia) S Mansouri	3	6	[10]
WC	(France) G Debru (France) G Jacq	6	4	[7]
4	(Ecuador) D Hidalgo (Colombia) C Rodríguez	6	7^{7}
(Sweden) A Göransson (Netherlands) S Verbeek	3	6^{4}

Final
(United Kingdom) L Johnson (Tunisia) S Mansouri	6	6
4	(Ecuador) D Hidalgo (Colombia) C Rodríguez	3	3
