= 2021 Andalucía Challenger – Doubles =

Doubles
- 2021 Andalucía Challenger

Final
- Champions: (United Kingdom) Dominic Inglot (Australia) Matt Reid
- Runners-up: (Monaco) Romain Arneodo (Monaco) Hugo Nys
- Score: 1–6, 6–3, [10–6]

Events
Singles	Doubles
← 2020 ·	Andalucía Challenger	· 2022 →

Gerard Granollers and Pedro Martínez were the defending champions but chose not to defend their title.

Dominic Inglot and Matt Reid won the title after defeating Romain Arneodo and Hugo Nys 1–6, 6–3, [10–6] in the final.

== Seeds ==
1. (United Kingdom) Dominic Inglot / (Australia) Matt Reid (champions)
2. (Monaco) Romain Arneodo / (Monaco) Hugo Nys (final)
3. (Sweden) André Göransson / (Belarus) Andrei Vasilevski (first round)
4. (New Zealand) Artem Sitak / (Spain) David Vega Hernández (first round)

== Draw ==
Key

- Q = Qualifier
- WC = Wild card
- LL = Lucky loser
- Alt = Alternate
- ITF = ITF entry
- PR = Protected ranking
- SR = Special ranking
- SE = Special exempt
- JE = Junior exempt
- JR = Junior Accelerator Programme entrant
- CO = College Accelerator Programme entrant
- NG = Next Gen Accelerator Program entrant
- w/o = Walkover
- r = Retired
- d = Defaulted

First round
1	(United Kingdom) D Inglot (Australia) M Reid	7^{7}	6
(Poland) K Drzewiecki (Czech Republic) L Rosol	6^{3}	3
(Spain) R Carballés Baena (Spain) Eduard Esteve Lobato	7^{7}	6
(United States) R Galloway (United States) A Lawson	6^{4}	2
3	(Sweden) A Göransson (Belarus) A Vasilevski	6^{3}	6	[5]
WC	(Spain) D Marrero (Spain) A Menéndez Maceiras	7^{7}	4	[10]
(Spain) C Gómez-Herrera (Spain) M Vilella Martínez	2	6	[11]
(Italy) A Giannessi (Italy) R Marcora	6	4	[9]
(France) S Doumbia (France) F Reboul	4	6^{2}
(Australia) M Polmans (Australia) J-P Smith	6	7^{7}
(Serbia) D Petrović (Austria) D Pichler	6	4	[10]
4	(New Zealand) A Sitak (Spain) D Vega Hernández	2	6	[1]
WC	(Sweden) Leo Borg (Sweden) E Ymer	3	3
(Mexico) MÁ Reyes-Varela (Brazil) F Romboli	6	6
WC	(Spain) J Barranco Cosano (Spain) C Sánchez Jover	3	3
2	(Monaco) R Arneodo (Monaco) H Nys	6	6

Quarterfinals
1	(United Kingdom) D Inglot (Australia) M Reid	6	7^{7}
(Spain) R Carballés Baena (Spain) E Esteve Lobato	3	6^{3}
WC	(Spain) D Marrero (Spain) A Menéndez Maceiras	0	6^{5}
(Spain) C Gómez-Herrera (Spain) M Vilella Martínez	6	7^{7}
(Australia) M Polmans (Australia) J-P Smith	7	6
(Serbia) D Petrović (Austria) D Pichler	5	3
(Mexico) MÁ Reyes-Varela (Brazil) F Romboli	6^{8}	4
2	(Monaco) R Arneodo (Monaco) H Nys	7^{10}	6

Semifinals
1	(United Kingdom) D Inglot (Australia) M Reid	7^{7}	6
(Spain) C Gómez-Herrera (Spain) M Vilella Martínez	6^{5}	4
(Australia) M Polmans (Australia) J-P Smith	2	6	[8]
2	(Monaco) R Arneodo (Monaco) H Nys	6	3	[10]

Final
1	(United Kingdom) D Inglot (Australia) M Reid	1	6	[10]
2	(Monaco) R Arneodo (Monaco) H Nys	6	3	[6]
