= 2018 Casino Admiral Trophy – Doubles =

Doubles
- 2018 Casino Admiral Trophy

Final
- Champions: (Argentina) Guido Andreozzi (Uruguay) Ariel Behar
- Runners-up: (Slovakia) Martin Kližan (Slovakia) Jozef Kovalík
- Score: 6–3, 6–4

Events
Singles	Doubles
Casino Admiral Trophy	· 2019 →

This was the first edition of the tournament.

Guido Andreozzi and Ariel Behar won the title after defeating Martin Kližan and Jozef Kovalík 6–3, 6–4 in the final.

== Seeds ==
1. (Chile) Hans Podlipnik-Castillo / (Belarus) Andrei Vasilevski (first round)
2. (Czech Republic) Roman Jebavý / (Croatia) Antonio Šančić (first round)
3. (Spain) David Marrero / (Spain) Tommy Robredo (first round)
4. (Argentina) Guido Andreozzi / (Uruguay) Ariel Behar (champions)

== Draw ==
=== Key ===
- Q = Qualifier
- WC = Wild card
- LL = Lucky loser
- Alt = Alternate
- SE = Special exempt
- PR = Protected ranking
- ITF = ITF entry
- JE = Junior exempt
- w/o = Walkover
- r = Retired
- d = Defaulted
- SR = Special ranking

First round
1	(Chile) H Podlipnik-Castillo (Belarus) A Vasilevski	6	1	[5]
WC	(Austria) J Melzer (Spain) A Menéndez Maceiras	0	6	[10]
(Slovakia) N Gombos (Slovakia) A Martin	2	1
(Slovakia) M Kližan (Slovakia) J Kovalík	6	6
3	(Spain) D Marrero (Spain) T Robredo	1	7^{7}	[9]
(Italy) M Cecchinato (Italy) M Donati	6	6^{1}	[11]
(Italy) A Motti (Italy) S Travaglia	1	6	[9]
(Spain) J Munar (Spain) D Vega Hernández	6	3	[11]
WC	(Serbia) M Djokovic (Spain) C Gómez-Herrera	6	6
(Italy) S Bolelli (Italy) A Giannessi	4	2
(Germany) D Brown (United Kingdom) J O'Mara	2	4
4	(Argentina) G Andreozzi (Uruguay) A Behar	6	6
WC	(United Kingdom) L Burton (New Zealand) Mark Hadley	2	1
(Germany) A Begemann (Czech Republic) L Rosol	6	6
(Spain) E López Pérez (India) R Ramanathan	3	6	[10]
2	(Czech Republic) R Jebavý (Croatia) A Šančić	6	4	[8]

Quarterfinals
WC	(Austria) J Melzer (Spain) A Menéndez Maceiras	4	2
(Slovakia) M Kližan (Slovakia) J Kovalík	6	6
(Italy) M Cecchinato (Italy) M Donati
(Spain) J Munar (Spain) D Vega Hernández	w/o
WC	(Serbia) M Djokovic (Spain) C Gómez-Herrera	6	5	[5]
4	(Argentina) G Andreozzi (Uruguay) A Behar	1	7	[10]
(Germany) A Begemann (Czech Republic) L Rosol	6^{5}	7^{7}	[8]
(Spain) E López Pérez (India) R Ramanathan	7^{7}	6^{4}	[10]

Semifinals
(Slovakia) M Kližan (Slovakia) J Kovalík	6	7^{10}
(Spain) J Munar (Spain) D Vega Hernández	4	6^{8}
4	(Argentina) G Andreozzi (Uruguay) A Behar	6	7
(Spain) E López Pérez (India) R Ramanathan	3	5

Final
(Slovakia) M Kližan (Slovakia) J Kovalík	3	4
4	(Argentina) G Andreozzi (Uruguay) A Behar	6	6
