= 2021 Andalucía Challenger – Singles =

Singles
- 2021 Andalucía Challenger

Final
- Champion: (Italy) Gianluca Mager
- Runner-up: (Spain) Jaume Munar
- Score: 2–6, 6–3, 6–2

Events
Singles	Doubles
← 2020 ·	Andalucía Challenger	· 2022 →

Pedro Martínez was the defending champion but chose not to defend his title.

Gianluca Mager won the title after defeating Jaume Munar 2–6, 6–3, 6–2 in the final.

== Seeds ==
1. (Spain) Roberto Carballés Baena (first round)
2. (Slovakia) Norbert Gombos (first round)
3. (Spain) Jaume Munar (final)
4. (Italy) Gianluca Mager (champion)
5. (Portugal) Pedro Sousa (second round)
6. (Japan) Taro Daniel (quarterfinals)
7. (Bosnia and Herzegovina) Damir Džumhur (second round)
8. (Russia) Evgeny Donskoy (first round)

== Draw ==
=== Key ===
- Q = Qualifier
- WC = Wild card
- LL = Lucky loser
- Alt = Alternate
- SE = Special exempt
- PR = Protected ranking
- ITF = ITF entry
- JE = Junior exempt
- w/o = Walkover
- r = Retired
- d = Defaulted
- SR = Special ranking

=== Finals ===
Semifinals
(Italy) Alessandro Giannessi	7^{7}	4	1
4	(Italy) Gianluca Mager	6^{4}	6	6
3	(Spain) Jaume Munar	7^{7}	7
Alt	(Spain) Mario Vilella Martínez	6^{4}	5

Final
4	(Italy) Gianluca Mager	2	6	6
3	(Spain) Jaume Munar	6	3	2

=== Top half ===
First round
1	(Spain) R Carballés Baena	6	3	3
(Switzerland) H Laaksonen	1	6	6
(United States) M Cressy	1	6^{3}
(Slovakia) M Kližan	6	7^{7}
(Portugal) J Domingues	3	4
(Italy) A Giannessi	6	6
PR	(Russia) A Kuznetsov	7^{7}	2	1
5	(Portugal) P Sousa	6^{2}	6	6
4	(Italy) G Mager	6	6
Q	(Spain) C Sánchez Jover	3	2
Alt	(Sweden) E Ymer	6	6
Q	(Spain) J Barranco Cosano	1	2
(Australia) M Polmans	3	1
(Italy) R Marcora	6	6
(Latvia) E Gulbis	6	6
8	(Russia) E Donskoy	2	2

Second round
(Switzerland) H Laaksonen	3	3
(Slovakia) M Kližan	6	6
(Italy) A Giannessi	6	6
5	(Portugal) P Sousa	4	3
4	(Italy) G Mager	6	6
Alt	(Sweden) E Ymer	4	3
(Italy) R Marcora	6	7
(Latvia) E Gulbis	4	5

Quarterfinals
(Slovakia) M Kližan	0	3
(Italy) A Giannessi	6	6
4	(Italy) G Mager	4	6	6
(Italy) R Marcora	6	3	2

Semifinals
(Italy) A Giannessi	7^{7}	4	1
4	(Italy) G Mager	6^{4}	6	6

=== Bottom half ===
First round
6	(Japan) T Daniel	6	6
WC	(Sweden) L Borg	1	2
WC	(Spain) C Gómez-Herrera	7^{12}	7^{7}
WC	(Spain) C Gimeno Valero	6^{10}	6^{5}
Q	(Czech Republic) V Kopřiva	6	3	7
(Czech Republic) L Rosol	3	6	5
(Austria) S Ofner	6^{3}	4
3	(Spain) J Munar	7^{7}	6
7	(Bosnia and Herzegovina) D Džumhur	6	6
Q	(Spain) N Sánchez Izquierdo	4	4
Alt	(Spain) M Vilella Martínez	7^{7}	6
(Italy) L Giustino	6^{4}	0
(Serbia) D Petrović	6	3	4
(Serbia) N Milojević	3	6	6
Alt	(France) M Janvier	6	6^{4}	6
2	(Slovakia) N Gombos	4	7^{7}	3

Second round
6	(Japan) T Daniel	7	6
WC	(Spain) C Gómez-Herrera	5	4
Q	(Czech Republic) V Kopřiva	4	2
3	(Spain) J Munar	6	6
7	(Bosnia and Herzegovina) D Džumhur	3	4
Alt	(Spain) M Vilella Martínez	6	6
(Serbia) N Milojević	6	7
Alt	(France) M Janvier	1	5

Quarterfinals
6	(Japan) T Daniel	6	2	3
3	(Spain) J Munar	4	6	6
Alt	(Spain) M Vilella Martínez	6	6
(Serbia) N Milojević	3	4

Semifinals
3	(Spain) J Munar	7^{7}	7
Alt	(Spain) M Vilella Martínez	6^{4}	5
