= 2020 Marbella Tennis Open =

- Date: 26 October – 1 November
- Edition: 3rd
- Surface: Clay
- Location: Marbella, Spain

Champions

Singles
- (Spain) Pedro Martínez

Doubles
- (Spain) Gerard Granollers / (Spain) Pedro Martínez
← 2019 ·	Marbella Tennis Open	· 2021 →

The 2020 Marbella Tennis Open was a professional tennis tournament played on clay courts. It was the third edition of the tournament which was part of the 2020 ATP Challenger Tour. It took place in Marbella, Spain between 26 October and 1 November 2020.

== Singles main-draw entrants ==
=== Seeds ===
Country	Player	Rank^{1}	Seed
ARG	Federico Coria	86	1
ESP	Pedro Martínez	92	2
ITA	Gianluca Mager	96	3
ESP	Roberto Carballés Baena	99	4
SVK	Andrej Martin	102	5
ESP	Jaume Munar	108	6
POR	Pedro Sousa	110	7
SVK	Jozef Kovalík	125	8

- ^{1} Rankings are as of 19 October 2020.

=== Other entrants ===
The following players received wildcards into the singles main draw:

- (Spain) Carlos Gómez-Herrera
- (Spain) Nicola Kuhn
- (Denmark) Holger Rune

The following players received entry into the singles main draw using a protected ranking:

- (Spain) Tommy Robredo

The following players received entry into the singles main draw as alternates:

- (France) Elliot Benchetrit
- (France) Alexandre Müller

The following players received entry from the qualifying draw:

- (Italy) Riccardo Bonadio
- (Spain) Carlos Gimeno Valero
- (Czech Republic) Vít Kopřiva
- (Italy) Andrea Pellegrino

== Champions ==
=== Singles ===
- (Spain) Pedro Martínez def. (Spain) Jaume Munar 7–6^{(7–4)}, 6–2.

=== Doubles ===
- (Spain) Gerard Granollers / (Spain) Pedro Martínez def. (Venezuela) Luis David Martínez / (Brazil) Fernando Romboli 6–3, 6–4.
