= 2019 Grand Prix Hassan II =

- Date: 8–14 April
- Edition: 35th
- Draw: 32S / 16D
- Prize money: €501,345
- Surface: Clay / outdoor
- Location: Marrakesh, Morocco

Champions

Singles
- (France) Benoît Paire

Doubles
- (Austria) Jürgen Melzer / (Croatia) Franko Škugor
- Grand Prix Hassan II

The 2019 Grand Prix Hassan II was a professional tennis tournament played on clay courts. It was the 35th edition of the tournament and part of the 2019 ATP Tour. It took place in Marrakesh, Morocco between 8 and 14 April 2019.

== Finals ==
=== Singles ===
- (France) Benoît Paire defeated (Spain) Pablo Andújar, 6–2, 6–3

=== Doubles ===
- (Austria) Jürgen Melzer / (Croatia) Franko Škugor defeated (Netherlands) Matwé Middelkoop / (Denmark) Frederik Nielsen, 6–4, 7–6^{(8–6)}

== Singles main-draw entrants ==
=== Seeds ===
Country	Player	Rank^{1}	Seed
GER	Alexander Zverev	3	1
ITA	Fabio Fognini	18	2
GBR	Kyle Edmund	22	3
FRA	Gilles Simon	27	4
SRB	Laslo Đere	32	5
ESP	Fernando Verdasco	38	6
GER	Philipp Kohlschreiber	41	7
FRA	Pierre-Hugues Herbert	50	8

- ^{1} Rankings are as of April 1, 2019.

=== Other entrants ===
The following players received wildcards into the singles main draw:

- (Italy) Fabio Fognini
- (France) Jo-Wilfried Tsonga
- (Germany) Alexander Zverev

The following player received entry using a protected ranking into the singles main draw:

- (Germany) Cedrik-Marcel Stebe

The following players received entry from the qualifying draw:

- (Argentina) Facundo Bagnis
- (Spain) Alejandro Davidovich Fokina
- (Spain) Adrián Menéndez Maceiras
- (Italy) Lorenzo Sonego

The following player received entry as a lucky loser:

- (Argentina) Carlos Berlocq

=== Withdrawals ===
Before the tournament

- (Canada) Félix Auger-Aliassime → replaced by (Argentina) Carlos Berlocq
- (Italy) Matteo Berrettini → replaced by (Uzbekistan) Denis Istomin
- (Spain) Pablo Carreño Busta → replaced by (Spain) Pablo Andújar
- (Bosnia and Herzegovina) Damir Džumhur → replaced by (Spain) Albert Ramos Viñolas
- (Poland) Hubert Hurkacz → replaced by (Czech Republic) Jiří Veselý
- (Kazakhstan) Mikhail Kukushkin → replaced by (Germany) Cedrik-Marcel Stebe
- (Australia) John Millman → replaced by (Slovakia) Jozef Kovalík (Note: Kovalík was initially entered into main draw on the alternate list using his protected ranking entry of 85. Therefore when some of the alternates withdrew, Kovalík decided to forfeit his protected ranking entry and used his regular ranking of 109 in the initial entry cutoff date of 25 February 2019.)
- (Portugal) João Sousa → replaced by (Italy) Thomas Fabbiano

During the tournament

- (Czech Republic) Jiří Veselý

== Doubles main-draw entrants ==
=== Seeds ===
Country	Player	Country	Player	Rank^{1}	Seed
GBR	Jamie Murray	AUS	John Peers	25	1
IND	Rohan Bopanna	GBR	Dominic Inglot	61	2
GER	Tim Pütz	NZL	Michael Venus	86	3
AUT	Oliver Marach	AUT	Philipp Oswald	89	4

- Rankings are as of April 1, 2019.

=== Other entrants ===
The following pairs received wildcards into the doubles main draw:

- (Morocco) Amine Ahouda / (Switzerland) Adam Moundir
- (Morocco) Anas Fattar / (Morocco) Lamine Ouahab

=== Retirements ===
- (New Zealand) Michael Venus
- (Belgium) Joran Vliegen
