= 2025 Open Aix Provence =

- Date: 29 April – 4 May
- Edition: 12th
- Surface: Clay
- Location: Aix-en-Provence, France

Champions

Singles
- (Croatia) Borna Ćorić

Doubles
- (United States) Robert Cash / (United States) JJ Tracy
← 2024 ·	Open Aix Provence	· 2026 →

The 2025 Open Aix Provence (also known as the Open Aix Provence Crédit Agricole for sponsorship reasons) was a professional tennis tournament played on clay courts. It was the twelfth edition of the tournament and an ATP Challenger Tour 175 event on the 2025 ATP Challenger Tour. It took place in Aix-en-Provence, France between 29 April and 4 May 2025.

== Singles main-draw entrants ==
=== Seeds ===
Country	Player	Rank^{1}	Seed
AUS	Alexei Popyrin	26	1
ITA	Luciano Darderi	46	2
FRA	Quentin Halys	52	3
ESP	Jaume Munar	53	4
ITA	Mattia Bellucci	66	5
FRA	Arthur Rinderknech	76	6
FRA	Hugo Gaston	80	7
FRA	Corentin Moutet	82	8

- ^{1} Rankings as of 21 April 2025.

=== Other entrants ===
The following players received wildcards into the singles main draw:

- (France) Arthur Géa
- (France) Moïse Kouamé
- (Switzerland) Stan Wawrinka

The following player received entry into the singles main draw using a protected ranking:

- (Croatia) Borna Gojo

The following players received entry into the singles main draw as alternates:

- (France) Grégoire Barrère
- (France) Ugo Blanchet
- (France) Pierre-Hugues Herbert
- (France) Kyrian Jacquet
- Pavel Kotov
- (Finland) Otto Virtanen

The following players received entry from the qualifying draw:

- (Peru) Ignacio Buse
- (Estonia) Mark Lajal
- (Spain) Albert Ramos Viñolas
- (Monaco) Valentin Vacherot

== Champions ==
=== Singles ===
- (Croatia) Borna Ćorić def. (Switzerland) Stan Wawrinka 6–7^{(5–7)}, 6–3, 7–6^{(7–4)}.

=== Doubles ===
- (United States) Robert Cash / (United States) JJ Tracy def. (France) Théo Arribagé / (Monaco) Hugo Nys 7–5, 7–6^{(7–5)}.
