= 2020 Marbella Tennis Open – Singles =

Singles
- 2020 Marbella Tennis Open

Final
- Champion: (Spain) Pedro Martínez
- Runner-up: (Spain) Jaume Munar
- Score: 7–6^{(7–4)}, 6–2

Events
Singles	Doubles
← 2019 ·	Marbella Tennis Open	· 2021 →

Pablo Andújar was the defending champion but chose not to defend his title.

Pedro Martínez won the title after defeating Jaume Munar 7–6^{(7–4)}, 6–2 in the final.

== Seeds ==
1. (Argentina) Federico Coria (first round)
2. (Spain) Pedro Martínez (champion)
3. (Italy) Gianluca Mager (second round)
4. (Spain) Roberto Carballés Baena (first round)
5. (Slovakia) Andrej Martin (first round)
6. (Spain) Jaume Munar (final)
7. (Portugal) Pedro Sousa (first round)
8. (Slovakia) Jozef Kovalík (first round)

== Draw ==
=== Key ===
- Q = Qualifier
- WC = Wild card
- LL = Lucky loser
- Alt = Alternate
- ITF = ITF entry
- PR = Protected ranking
- SR = Special ranking
- SE = Special exempt
- JE = Junior exempt
- JR = Junior Accelerator Programme entrant
- CO = College Accelerator Programme entrant
- NG = Next Gen Accelerator Program entrant
- w/o = Walkover
- r = Retired
- d = Defaulted

=== Finals ===
Semifinals
Alt	(France) Alexandre Müller	4	4
6	(Spain) Jaume Munar	6	6
(Spain) Carlos Taberner	4	2
2	(Spain) Pedro Martínez	6	6

Final
6	(Spain) Jaume Munar	6^{4}	2
2	(Spain) Pedro Martínez	7^{7}	6

=== Top half ===
First round
1	(Argentina) F Coria	4	1
Q	(Spain) C Gimeno Valero	6	6
(Canada) S Diez	6	6
WC	(Spain) C Gómez-Herrera	2	3
(Spain) B Zapata Miralles	6	3
PR	(Spain) T Robredo	0	0^{r}
Alt	(France) A Müller	6	6
7	(Portugal) P Sousa	3	4
4	(Spain) R Carballés Baena	6^{3}	2
Q	(Czech Republic) V Kopřiva	7^{7}	6
(Italy) F Gaio	6	4	6
WC	(Spain) N Kuhn	3	6	4
(Spain) C Alcaraz	6	5	4
(Italy) L Giustino	3	7	6
Q	(Italy) R Bonadio	6^{3}	7	3
6	(Spain) J Munar	7^{7}	5	6

Second round
Q	(Spain) C Gimeno Valero	6	6
(Canada) S Diez	3	3
(Spain) B Zapata Miralles	4	4
Alt	(France) A Müller	6	6
Q	(Czech Republic) V Kopřiva	3	7^{7}	6
(Italy) F Gaio	6	6^{1}	4
(Italy) L Giustino	1	3
6	(Spain) J Munar	6	6

Quarterfinals
Q	(Spain) C Gimeno Valero	4	0
Alt	(France) A Müller	6	6
Q	(Czech Republic) V Kopřiva	1	5
6	(Spain) J Munar	6	7

Semifinals
Alt	(France) A Müller	4	4
6	(Spain) J Munar	6	6

=== Bottom half ===
First round
8	(Slovakia) J Kovalík	3	5
(United Kingdom) J Clarke	6	7
(Spain) C Taberner	3	7	7^{7}
(India) R Ramanathan	6	5	6^{4}
Q	(Italy) A Pellegrino	3	2
(Colombia) DE Galán	6	6
(Italy) A Giannessi	6	1	2
3	(Italy) G Mager	2	6	6
5	(Slovakia) A Martin	3	6	6^{7}
(Portugal) J Domingues	6	3	7^{9}
(Slovenia) B Rola	4	6	6
(France) M Janvier	6	2	4
WC	(Denmark) H Rune	6	4	4
Alt	(France) E Benchetrit	1	6	6
(Spain) M Vilella Martínez	2	1
2	(Spain) P Martínez	6	6

Second round
(United Kingdom) J Clarke	6^{2}	6	3
(Spain) C Taberner	7^{7}	1	6
(Colombia) DE Galán	4	7	6
3	(Italy) G Mager	6	5	1
(Portugal) J Domingues	3	3
(Slovenia) B Rola	6	6
Alt	(France) E Benchetrit	5	3
2	(Spain) P Martínez	7	6

Quarterfinals
(Spain) C Taberner	5	6	6
(Colombia) DE Galán	7	4	4
(Slovenia) B Rola	6^{4}	6	3
2	(Spain) P Martínez	7^{7}	4	6

Semifinals
(Spain) C Taberner	4	2
2	(Spain) P Martínez	6	6
