= 2022 Andalucía Challenger – Women's singles =

Women's singles
- 2022 Andalucía Challenger

Final
- Champion: (Egypt) Mayar Sherif
- Runner-up: (Germany) Tamara Korpatsch
- Score: 7–6^{(7–1)}, 6–4

Details
- Draw: 32 (3 WC)
- Seeds: 8

Events
Singles	men	women
Doubles	men	women
Andalucía Challenger	· 2023 →

This was the first edition of the tournament.

Mayar Sherif won the title, defeating Tamara Korpatsch in the final, 7–6^{(7–1)}, 6–4.

== Seeds ==
1. (Montenegro) Danka Kovinić (semifinals)
2. Varvara Gracheva (second round)
3. (Egypt) Mayar Sherif (champion)
4. (Netherlands) Arantxa Rus (second round)
5. (France) Clara Burel (second round)
6. (Hungary) Panna Udvardy (quarterfinals)
7. (Italy) Martina Trevisan (quarterfinals)
8. (Slovakia) Anna Karolína Schmiedlová (quarterfinals)

== Draw ==
=== Key ===
- Q = Qualifier
- WC = Wild card
- LL = Lucky loser
- Alt = Alternate
- SE = Special exempt
- PR = Protected ranking
- ITF = ITF entry
- JE = Junior exempt
- w/o = Walkover
- r = Retired
- d = Defaulted
- SR = Special ranking

=== Finals ===
Semifinals
1	(Montenegro) Danka Kovinić	5	6^{3}
3	(Egypt) Mayar Sherif	7	7^{7}
Alt	(Germany) Tamara Korpatsch	6	7^{7}
(France) Océane Dodin	1	6^{3}

Final
3	(Egypt) Mayar Sherif	7^{7}	6
Alt	(Germany) Tamara Korpatsch	6^{1}	4

=== Top half ===
First round
1	(Montenegro) D Kovinić	6^{2}	6	7
PR	(Luxembourg) M Minella	7^{7}	2	5
(France) F Ferro	3	7	5
WC	E Avanesyan	6	5	7
WC	(Spain) I Burillo Escorihuela	1	7	3
(Germany) A-L Friedsam	6	5	6
(France) K Mladenovic	6^{5}	0
7	(Italy) M Trevisan	7^{7}	6
3	(Egypt) M Sherif	6	6
A Blinkova	3	4
(Bulgaria) V Tomova	6^{0}	1
PR	(Italy) E Cocciaretto	7^{7}	6
(Romania) A Bogdan	6	6
(Croatia) D Vekić	1	0
(Serbia) A Krunić	2	4
8	(Slovakia) AK Schmiedlová	6	6

Second round
1	(Montenegro) D Kovinić	6	6
WC	E Avanesyan	3	4
(Germany) A-L Friedsam	1	4
7	(Italy) M Trevisan	6	6
3	(Egypt) M Sherif	6	6
PR	(Italy) E Cocciaretto	2	4
(Romania) A Bogdan	6^{1}	0
8	(Slovakia) AK Schmiedlová	7^{7}	6

Quarterfinals
1	(Montenegro) D Kovinić	4	6	6
7	(Italy) M Trevisan	6	3	3
3	(Egypt) M Sherif	6	6
8	(Slovakia) AK Schmiedlová	2	2

Semifinals
1	(Montenegro) D Kovinić	5	6^{3}
3	(Egypt) M Sherif	7	7^{7}

=== Bottom half ===
First round
6	(Hungary) P Udvardy	6	6
(Romania) I Bara	1	4
(Poland) K Kawa	1	6^{5}
WC	(Germany) N Schunk	6	7^{7}
(China) L Zhu	1	6^{5}
Alt	(Germany) T Korpatsch	6	7^{7}
(Italy) S Errani	6	6^{4}	3
4	(Netherlands) A Rus	4	7^{7}	6
5	(France) C Burel	6	6
WC	(Spain) A Lázaro García	4	4
(Austria) J Grabher	4	6	3
(Spain) R Masarova	6	2	6
(France) O Dodin	6	7^{7}
(Ukraine) L Tsurenko	4	6^{5}
(Georgia (country)) E Gorgodze	7	3	4
2	V Gracheva	5	6	6

Second round
6	(Hungary) P Udvardy	6	7^{7}
WC	(Germany) N Schunk	3	6^{2}
Alt	(Germany) T Korpatsch	6	6^{5}	6
4	(Netherlands) A Rus	0	7^{7}	3
5	(France) C Burel	6	2	3
(Spain) R Masarova	4	6	6
(France) O Dodin	0	6	6
2	V Gracheva	6	2	2

Quarterfinals
6	(Hungary) P Udvardy	6^{6}	3
Alt	(Germany) T Korpatsch	7^{8}	6
(Spain) R Masarova	4	1
(France) O Dodin	6	6

Semifinals
Alt	(Germany) T Korpatsch	6	7^{7}
(France) O Dodin	1	6^{3}
