= 2022 Andalucía Challenger – Men's doubles =

Men's doubles
- 2022 Andalucía Challenger

Final
- Champions: (Czech Republic) Roman Jebavý (Austria) Philipp Oswald
- Runners-up: (Monaco) Hugo Nys (Poland) Jan Zieliński
- Score: 7–6^{(8–6)}, 3–6, [10–3]

Events
Singles	men	women
Doubles	men	women
← 2021 ·	Andalucía Challenger	· 2023 →

Dominic Inglot and Matt Reid were the defending champions but chose not to defend their title.

Roman Jebavý and Philipp Oswald won the title after defeating Hugo Nys and Jan Zieliński 7–6^{(8–6)}, 3–6, [10–3] in the final.

== Seeds ==
1. (Kazakhstan) Aleksandr Nedovyesov / (Pakistan) Aisam-ul-Haq Qureshi (semifinals)
2. (Monaco) Hugo Nys / (Poland) Jan Zieliński (final)
3. (Finland) Harri Heliövaara / (United States) Nathaniel Lammons (semifinals)
4. (Czech Republic) Roman Jebavý / (Austria) Philipp Oswald (champions)

== Draw ==
=== Key ===
- Q = Qualifier
- WC = Wild card
- LL = Lucky loser
- Alt = Alternate
- ITF = ITF entry
- PR = Protected ranking
- SR = Special ranking
- SE = Special exempt
- JE = Junior exempt
- JR = Junior Accelerator Programme entrant
- CO = College Accelerator Programme entrant
- NG = Next Gen Accelerator Program entrant
- w/o = Walkover
- r = Retired
- d = Defaulted

First round
1	(Kazakhstan) A Nedovyesov (Pakistan) A-u-H Qureshi	6	6
(Brazil) R Matos (Spain) D Vega Hernández	3	4
(Spain) P Andújar (Switzerland) S Wawrinka	4	7	[11]
(France) S Doumbia (France) F Reboul	6	5	[9]
4	(Czech Republic) R Jebavý (Austria) P Oswald	6	6
(Serbia) N Milojević (Sweden) E Ymer	4	2
(United Kingdom) J O'Mara (United Kingdom) K Skupski	7	6
(Spain) C Taberner (Spain) B Zapata Miralles	5	3
WC	A Shevchenko (Greece) Pe Tsitsipas	6	1	[10]
(Spain) S Martos Gornés (New Zealand) A Sitak	1	6	[3]
(Slovakia) N Gombos (Slovakia) L Klein	6^{4}	3
3	(Finland) H Heliövaara (United States) N Lammons	7^{7}	6
(Serbia) I Sabanov (Serbia) M Sabanov	3	1
WC	(Spain) C Gómez-Herrera (Spain) M Vilella Martínez	6	6
(Germany) Y Hanfmann (Spain) A Menéndez Maceiras	4	2
2	(Monaco) H Nys (Poland) J Zieliński	6	6

Quarterfinals
1	(Kazakhstan) A Nedovyesov (Pakistan) A-u-H Qureshi	6	7^{7}
(Spain) P Andújar (Switzerland) S Wawrinka	1	6^{1}
4	(Czech Republic) R Jebavý (Austria) P Oswald	2	6	[10]
(United Kingdom) J O'Mara (United Kingdom) K Skupski	6	3	[7]
WC	A Shevchenko (Greece) Pe Tsitsipas	2	4
3	(Finland) H Heliövaara (United States) N Lammons	6	6
WC	(Spain) C Gómez-Herrera (Spain) M Vilella Martínez	4	3
2	(Monaco) H Nys (Poland) J Zieliński	6	6

Semifinals
1	(Kazakhstan) A Nedovyesov (Pakistan) A-u-H Qureshi	4	3
4	(Czech Republic) R Jebavý (Austria) P Oswald	6	6
3	(Finland) H Heliövaara (United States) N Lammons	3	5
2	(Monaco) H Nys (Poland) J Zieliński	6	7

Final
4	(Czech Republic) R Jebavý (Austria) P Oswald	7^{8}	3	[10]
2	(Monaco) H Nys (Poland) J Zieliński	6^{6}	6	[3]
