= 2024 Open Aix Provence =

- Date: 30 April – 5 May
- Edition: 11th
- Surface: Clay
- Location: Aix-en-Provence, France

Champions

Singles
- (Chile) Alejandro Tabilo

Doubles
- (United Kingdom) Luke Johnson / (Tunisia) Skander Mansouri
← 2023 ·	Open Aix Provence	· 2025 →

The 2024 Open Aix Provence (also known as the Open Aix Provence Crédit Agricole for sponsorship reasons) was a professional tennis tournament played on clay courts. It was the eleventh edition of the tournament, and part of the 2024 ATP Challenger Tour. It took place in Aix-en-Provence, France between 30 April and 5 May 2024.

== Singles main-draw entrants ==
=== Seeds ===
Country	Player	Rank^{1}	Seed
FRA	Adrian Mannarino	20	1
ARG	Tomás Martín Etcheverry	27	2
CHI	Alejandro Tabilo	38	3
	Roman Safiullin	42	4
USA	Marcos Giron	51	5
ESP	Pedro Martínez	55	6
KAZ	Alexander Shevchenko	59	7
AUS	Aleksandar Vukic	62	8

- ^{1} Rankings as of 22 April 2024.

=== Other entrants ===
The following players received wildcards into the singles main draw:

- (France) Térence Atmane
- (France) Adrian Mannarino
- (Switzerland) Stan Wawrinka

The following players received entry into the singles main draw as alternates:

- (Argentina) Francisco Comesaña
- (Chile) Cristian Garín
- (France) Richard Gasquet
- (Belgium) ~~David Goffin~~
- (France) Harold Mayot
- (France) Alexandre Müller
- (Spain) Albert Ramos Viñolas

The following players received entry from the qualifying draw:

- (Argentina) Facundo Bagnis
- (Kazakhstan) Mikhail Kukushkin
- (Brazil) Felipe Meligeni Alves
- (Monaco) Valentin Vacherot

The following player received entry as a lucky loser:

- (France) Grégoire Barrère

== Champions ==
=== Singles ===
- (Chile) Alejandro Tabilo def. (Spain) Jaume Munar 6–3, 6–2.

=== Doubles ===
- (United Kingdom) Luke Johnson / (Tunisia) Skander Mansouri def. (Ecuador) Diego Hidalgo / (Colombia) Cristian Rodríguez 6–3, 6–3.
