= 2022 Andalucía Challenger – Women's doubles =

Women's doubles
- 2022 Andalucía Challenger

Final
- Champions: (Romania) Irina Bara (Georgia (country)) Ekaterine Gorgodze
- Runners-up: (Germany) Vivian Heisen (Poland) Katarzyna Kawa
- Score: 6–4, 3–6, [10–6]

Events
Singles	men	women
Doubles	men	women
Andalucía Challenger	· 2023 →

This was the first edition of the tournament.

Irina Bara and Ekaterine Gorgodze won the title, defeating Vivian Heisen and Katarzyna Kawa in the final, 6–4, 3–6, [10–6].

== Seeds ==
1. (Serbia) Aleksandra Krunić / Alexandra Panova (semifinals)
2. (Romania) Irina Bara / (Georgia (country)) Ekaterine Gorgodze (champions)

== Draw ==
=== Key ===
- Q = Qualifier
- WC = Wild card
- LL = Lucky loser
- Alt = Alternate
- SE = Special exempt
- PR = Protected ranking
- ITF = ITF entry
- JE = Junior exempt
- w/o = Walkover
- r = Retired
- d = Defaulted
- SR = Special ranking

=== Draw ===
Quarterfinals
1	(Serbia) A Krunić; A Panova	6	7^{8}
(Germany) A-L Friedsam (Luxembourg) M Minella	1	6^{6}
(Germany) V Heisen (Poland) K Kawa	7	3	[10]
(Germany) J Lohoff (Czech Republic) R Voráčová	5	6	[4]
(United States) K Christian; Y Sizikova	2	1
WC	(Spain) R Masarova (Hungary) P Udvardy	6	6
(Poland) K Piter (Belgium) K Zimmermann	3	2
2	(Romania) I Bara (Georgia (country)) E Gorgodze	6	6

Semifinals
1	(Serbia) A Krunić; A Panova	6^{6}	2
(Germany) V Heisen (Poland) K Kawa	7^{8}	6
WC	(Spain) R Masarova (Hungary) P Udvardy	2	4
2	(Romania) I Bara (Georgia (country)) E Gorgodze	6	6

Final
(Germany) V Heisen (Poland) K Kawa	4	6	[6]
2	(Romania) I Bara (Georgia (country)) E Gorgodze	6	3	[10]
