= 2019 Grand Prix Hassan II – Doubles =

Doubles
- 2019 Grand Prix Hassan II

Final
- Champions: (Austria) Jürgen Melzer (Croatia) Franko Škugor
- Runners-up: (Netherlands) Matwé Middelkoop (Denmark) Frederik Nielsen
- Score: 6–4, 7–6^{(8–6)}

Events
Singles	Doubles
- Grand Prix Hassan II

Jürgen Melzer and Franko Škugor defeated Matwé Middelkoop and Frederik Nielsen in the final, 6–4, 7–6^{(8–6)}, to win the doubles tennis title at the 2019 Grand Prix Hassan II. They won their first title as a team, having never played together in a prior tournament. It marked Melzer's 15th individual doubles title and Škugor's fourth.

Nikola Mektić and Alexander Peya were the defending champions, but they did not return to compete.

== Seeds ==
1. (United Kingdom) Jamie Murray / (Australia) John Peers (first round)
2. (India) Rohan Bopanna / (United Kingdom) Dominic Inglot (quarterfinals)
3. (Germany) Tim Pütz / (New Zealand) Michael Venus (first round, retired)
4. (Austria) Oliver Marach / (Austria) Philipp Oswald (quarterfinals)

== Draw ==
Key

- Q = Qualifier
- WC = Wild card
- LL = Lucky loser
- Alt = Alternate
- ITF = ITF entry
- PR = Protected ranking
- SR = Special ranking
- SE = Special exempt
- JE = Junior exempt
- JR = Junior Accelerator Programme entrant
- CO = College Accelerator Programme entrant
- NG = Next Gen Accelerator Program entrant
- w/o = Walkover
- r = Retired
- d = Defaulted

=== Draw ===
First round
1	(United Kingdom) J Murray (Australia) J Peers	6^{3}	7^{9}	[6]
(Netherlands) M Middelkoop (Denmark) F Nielsen	7^{7}	6^{7}	[10]
(Japan) T Daniel (Argentina) JI Londero	1	6^{3}
(Germany) K Krawietz (Germany) A Mies	6	7^{7}
3	(Germany) T Pütz (New Zealand) M Venus	6	1^{r}
(Italy) S Bolelli (Tunisia) M Jaziri	3	4
(Belgium) S Gillé (Belgium) J Vliegen	4	7^{13}	[10]
WC	(Morocco) A Fattar (Morocco) L Ouahab	6	6^{11}	[3]
(India) L Paes (France) B Paire	7^{7}	6
(Brazil) M Demoliner (India) D Sharan	6^{4}	3
PR	(Serbia) L Đere (Serbia) N Zimonjić	5	6	[2]
4	(Austria) O Marach (Austria) P Oswald	7	3	[10]
(Austria) J Melzer (Croatia) F Škugor	6	6
WC	(Morocco) A Ahouda (Switzerland) A Moundir	2	1
(Czech Republic) R Jebavý (Argentina) A Molteni	6	3	[8]
2	(India) R Bopanna (United Kingdom) D Inglot	0	6	[10]

Quarterfinals
(Netherlands) M Middelkoop (Denmark) F Nielsen	1	6	[10]
(Germany) K Krawietz (Germany) A Mies	6	4	[8]
(Italy) S Bolelli (Tunisia) M Jaziri	6	2
(Belgium) S Gillé (Belgium) J Vliegen	2	1^{r}
(India) L Paes (France) B Paire	7	3	[12]
4	(Austria) O Marach (Austria) P Oswald	5	6	[10]
(Austria) J Melzer (Croatia) F Škugor	6	6^{2}	[10]
2	(India) R Bopanna (United Kingdom) D Inglot	3	7^{7}	[7]

Semifinals
(Netherlands) M Middelkoop (Denmark) F Nielsen	6	6
(Italy) S Bolelli (Tunisia) M Jaziri	3	2
(India) L Paes (France) B Paire	6	3	[5]
(Austria) J Melzer (Croatia) F Škugor	1	6	[10]

Final
(Netherlands) M Middelkoop (Denmark) F Nielsen	4	6^{6}
(Austria) J Melzer (Croatia) F Škugor	6	7^{8}
