= 2024 Open Aix Provence – Singles =

Singles
- 2024 Open Aix Provence

Final
- Champion: (Chile) Alejandro Tabilo
- Runner-up: (Spain) Jaume Munar
- Score: 6–3, 6–2

Events
Singles	Doubles
← 2023 ·	Open Aix Provence	· 2025 →

Alejandro Tabilo won the singles title at the 2024 Open Aix Provence after defeating Jaume Munar 6–3, 6–2 in the final.

Andy Murray was the defending champion but chose not to defend his title.

== Seeds ==
The top four seeds received a bye into the second round.

1. (France) Adrian Mannarino (second round)
2. (Argentina) Tomás Martín Etcheverry (quarterfinals)
3. (Chile) Alejandro Tabilo (champion)
4. Roman Safiullin (semifinals)
5. (United States) Marcos Giron (first round)
6. (Spain) Pedro Martínez (first round)
7. (Kazakhstan) Alexander Shevchenko (second round)
8. (Australia) Aleksandar Vukic (first round)

== Draw ==
=== Key ===
- Q = Qualifier
- WC = Wild card
- LL = Lucky loser
- Alt = Alternate
- SE = Special exempt
- PR = Protected ranking
- ITF = ITF entry
- JE = Junior exempt
- w/o = Walkover
- r = Retired
- d = Defaulted
- SR = Special ranking

=== Finals ===
Semifinals
Q	(Monaco) Valentin Vacherot	6	1	3
3	(Chile) Alejandro Tabilo	3	6	6
4	Roman Safiullin	6^{4}	3
(Spain) Jaume Munar	7^{7}	6

Final
3	(Chile) Alejandro Tabilo	6	6
(Spain) Jaume Munar	3	2

=== Top half ===
First round
Alt	(France) H Mayot	3	6	4
Alt	(France) R Gasquet	6	3	6
(United States) A Kovacevic	5	6^{5}
Q	(Monaco) V Vacherot	7	7^{7}
Q	(Brazil) F Meligeni Alves	6	6
8	(Australia) A Vukic	2	3
(France) H Gaston	6	6
WC	(France) T Atmane	2	4
Q	(Argentina) F Bagnis	6^{9}	6	6
(Finland) E Ruusuvuori	7^{11}	4	2
LL	(France) G Barrère	3	1
7	(Kazakhstan) A Shevchenko	6	6

Second round
1/WC	(France) A Mannarino	2	2
Alt	(France) R Gasquet	6	6
Q	(Monaco) V Vacherot	6	3	7^{7}
Q	(Brazil) F Meligeni Alves	3	6	6^{4}
3	(Chile) A Tabilo	4	6	7
(France) H Gaston	6	1	5
Q	(Argentina) F Bagnis	6	1	6
7	(Kazakhstan) A Shevchenko	3	6	3

Quarterfinals
Alt	(France) R Gasquet	3	4
Q	(Monaco) V Vacherot	6	6
3	(Chile) A Tabilo	6	0
Q	(Argentina) F Bagnis	0	0^{r}

Semifinals
Q	(Monaco) V Vacherot	6	1	3
3	(Chile) A Tabilo	3	6	6

=== Bottom half ===
First round
6	(Spain) P Martínez	6	4	4
(United States) B Nakashima	3	6	6
Alt	(Argentina) F Comesaña	6	1	7^{8}
Q	(Kazakhstan) M Kukushkin	4	6	6^{6}
WC	(Switzerland) S Wawrinka	3	7^{7}	4
Alt	(Spain) A Ramos Viñolas	6	6^{3}	6
5	(United States) M Giron	1	3
(Spain) J Munar	6	6
Alt	(France) A Müller	6	6
Alt	(Chile) C Garín	4	2
(Netherlands) B van de Zandschulp	4	7^{9}	3
(France) A Rinderknech	6	6^{7}	6

Second round
(United States) B Nakashima	7	7^{9}
Alt	(Argentina) F Comesaña	5	6^{7}
Alt	(Spain) A Ramos Viñolas	3	2
4	R Safiullin	6	6
(Spain) J Munar	7	4	6
Alt	(France) A Müller	5	6	3
(France) A Rinderknech	6^{3}	5
2	(Argentina) TM Etcheverry	7^{7}	7

Quarterfinals
(United States) B Nakashima	3	6^{5}
4	R Safiullin	6	7^{7}
(Spain) J Munar	6	6
2	(Argentina) TM Etcheverry	3	4

Semifinals
4	R Safiullin	6^{4}	3
(Spain) J Munar	7^{7}	6
