= 2025 Open Aix Provence – Doubles =

Doubles
- 2025 Open Aix Provence

Final
- Champions: (United States) Robert Cash (United States) JJ Tracy
- Runners-up: (France) Théo Arribagé (Monaco) Hugo Nys
- Score: 7–5, 7–6^{(7–5)}

Events
Singles	Doubles
- Open Aix Provence

Luke Johnson and Skander Mansouri were the defending champions but only Johnson chose to defend his title, partnering Sander Arends. They lost in the semifinals to Robert Cash and JJ Tracy.

Cash and Tracy won the title after defeating Théo Arribagé and Hugo Nys 7–5, 7–6^{(7–5)} in the final.

== Seeds ==
1. (Australia) Matthew Ebden / (Australia) John Peers (quarterfinals)
2. (France) Sadio Doumbia / (France) Fabien Reboul (semifinals)
3. (Netherlands) Sander Arends / (United Kingdom) Luke Johnson (semifinals)
4. (France) Théo Arribagé / (Monaco) Hugo Nys (final)

== Draw ==
Key

- Q = Qualifier
- WC = Wild card
- LL = Lucky loser
- Alt = Alternate
- ITF = ITF entry
- PR = Protected ranking
- SR = Special ranking
- SE = Special exempt
- JE = Junior exempt
- JR = Junior Accelerator Programme entrant
- CO = College Accelerator Programme entrant
- NG = Next Gen Accelerator Program entrant
- w/o = Walkover
- r = Retired
- d = Defaulted

=== Draw ===
First round
1	(Australia) M Ebden (Australia) J Peers	7^{7}	7
(Ecuador) G Escobar (Ecuador) D Hidalgo	6^{4}	5
(United States) R Cash (United States) JJ Tracy	2	6	[10]
(Netherlands) R Haase (Germany) H Jebens	6	3	[5]
3	(Netherlands) S Arends (United Kingdom) L Johnson	6	6
(India) VS Prashanth (Greece) Pe Tsitsipas	3	3
(France) P-H Herbert (France) A Rinderknech	4	6	[10]
PR	(Spain) Í Cervantes (Argentina) G Durán	6	2	[12]
(France) J Eysseric (France) Q Halys	4	6	[8]
(Italy) M Bortolotti (Romania) V Cornea	6	3	[10]
WC	(France) A Bouquier (France) K de Schepper	2	4
4	(France) T Arribagé (Monaco) H Nys	6	6
(India) S Balaji (Mexico) M Reyes-Varela	6	6
WC	(France) M Chazal (France) L Lokoli	4	3
(France) U Blanchet (France) K Jacquet	2	4
2	(France) S Doumbia (France) F Reboul	6	6

Quarterfinals
1	(Australia) M Ebden (Australia) J Peers	4	0
(United States) R Cash (United States) JJ Tracy	6	6
3	(Netherlands) S Arends (United Kingdom) L Johnson	6	7^{7}
PR	(Spain) Í Cervantes (Argentina) G Durán	3	6^{2}
(Italy) M Bortolotti (Romania) V Cornea	3	3
4	(France) T Arribagé (Monaco) H Nys	6	6
(India) S Balaji (Mexico) M Reyes-Varela	3	6	[10]
2	(France) S Doumbia (France) F Reboul	6	2	[12]

Semifinals
(United States) R Cash (United States) JJ Tracy	7^{7}	2	[13]
3	(Netherlands) S Arends (United Kingdom) L Johnson	6^{4}	6	[11]
4	(France) T Arribagé (Monaco) H Nys	4	7^{7}	[10]
2	(France) S Doumbia (France) F Reboul	6	6^{4}	[7]

Final
(United States) R Cash (United States) JJ Tracy	7	7^{7}
4	(France) T Arribagé (Monaco) H Nys	5	6^{5}
