= 2020 Marbella Tennis Open – Doubles =

Doubles
- 2020 Marbella Tennis Open

Final
- Champions: (Spain) Gerard Granollers (Spain) Pedro Martínez
- Runners-up: (Venezuela) Luis David Martínez (Brazil) Fernando Romboli
- Score: 6–3, 6–4

Events
Singles	Doubles
- Marbella Tennis Open

Kevin Krawietz and Andreas Mies were the defending champions but chose not to defend their title.

Gerard Granollers and Pedro Martínez won the title after defeating Luis David Martínez and Fernando Romboli 6–3, 6–4 in the final.

== Seeds ==
1. (Monaco) Romain Arneodo / (Spain) David Vega Hernández (first round)
2. (India) Purav Raja / (India) Ramkumar Ramanathan (first round)
3. (Venezuela) Luis David Martínez / (Brazil) Fernando Romboli (final)
4. (Spain) Gerard Granollers / (Spain) Pedro Martínez (champions)

== Draw ==
Key

- Q = Qualifier
- WC = Wild card
- LL = Lucky loser
- Alt = Alternate
- ITF = ITF entry
- PR = Protected ranking
- SR = Special ranking
- SE = Special exempt
- JE = Junior exempt
- JR = Junior Accelerator Programme entrant
- CO = College Accelerator Programme entrant
- NG = Next Gen Accelerator Program entrant
- w/o = Walkover
- r = Retired
- d = Defaulted

First round
1	(Monaco) R Arneodo (Spain) D Vega Hernández	3	2
(Italy) F Gaio (Italy) A Pellegrino	6	6
Alt	(France) E Benchetrit (France) A Müller	1	0
Alt	(Serbia) P Krstin (Bulgaria) D Kuzmanov	6	6
4	(Spain) G Granollers (Spain) P Martínez	6	6
(Spain) S Martos Gornés (Spain) J Munar	4	3
(Tunisia) M Jaziri (Slovakia) J Kovalík
Alt	(Czech Republic) V Kopřiva (Czech Republic) J Pospíšil	w/o
(Slovakia) A Martin (Portugal) G Oliveira	5	6	[10]
WC	(Spain) Í Cervantes (Spain) O Roca Batalla	7	4	[4]
(Italy) R Bonadio (Colombia) DE Galán	6^{4}	7	[12]
3	(Venezuela) LD Martínez (Brazil) F Romboli	7^{7}	5	[14]
WC	(Spain) C Gómez-Herrera (Spain) M Vilella Martínez	6^{5}	2
(Canada) S Diez (Slovenia) B Rola	7^{7}	6
(Spain) C Taberner (Spain) B Zapata Miralles	6	6
2	(India) P Raja (India) R Ramanathan	2	4

Quarterfinals
(Italy) F Gaio (Italy) A Pellegrino	w/o
Alt	(Serbia) P Krstin (Bulgaria) D Kuzmanov
4	(Spain) G Granollers (Spain) P Martínez	4	6	[10]
Alt	(Czech Republic) V Kopřiva (Czech Republic) J Pospíšil	6	2	[4]
(Slovakia) A Martin (Portugal) G Oliveira
3	(Venezuela) LD Martínez (Brazil) F Romboli	w/o
(Canada) S Diez (Slovenia) B Rola	6	6
(Spain) C Taberner (Spain) B Zapata Miralles	3	0

Semifinals
(Italy) F Gaio (Italy) A Pellegrino	3	6^{2}
4	(Spain) G Granollers (Spain) P Martínez	6	7^{7}
3	(Venezuela) LD Martínez (Brazil) F Romboli	w/o
(Canada) S Diez (Slovenia) B Rola

Final
4	(Spain) G Granollers (Spain) P Martínez	6	6
3	(Venezuela) LD Martínez (Brazil) F Romboli	3	4
