= 2022 Andalucía Challenger =

- Date: 28 March – 3 April
- Edition: 5th (men); 1st (women)
- Category: ATP Challenger 125 (men); WTA 125 (women)
- Draw: 32S / 16D (men); 32S / 8D (women)
- Prize money: €134,920 (men) $115,000 (women)
- Surface: Clay
- Location: Marbella, Spain
- Venue: Club de Tenis Puente Romano

Champions

Men's singles
- (Spain) Jaume Munar

Women's singles
- (Egypt) Mayar Sherif

Men's doubles
- (Czech Republic) Roman Jebavý / (Austria) Philipp Oswald

Women's doubles
- (Romania) Irina Bara / (Georgia (country)) Ekaterine Gorgodze
- Andalucía Challenger

The 2022 Andalucía Challenger (branded as the 2022 AnyTech365 Andalucía Open for sponsorship reasons) was a professional clay court tennis tournament that took place from 28 March to 3 April 2022 at the Club de Tenis Puente Romano in Marbella, Spain. It was the fifth edition of the men's event and part of the 2022 ATP Challenger Tour. It was also the first edition of the women's event and a part of the 2022 WTA 125 calendar.

== Men's singles main-draw entrants ==
=== Seeds ===
Country	Player	Rank^{1}	Seed
AUT	Dominic Thiem	50	1
SVK	Alex Molčan	65	2
ESP	Pablo Andújar	67	3
CZE	Jiří Veselý	77	4
ESP	Roberto Carballés Baena	79	5
ESP	Jaume Munar	89	6
ITA	Marco Cecchinato	93	7
ESP	Carlos Taberner	94	8

- ^{1} Rankings are as of 21 March 2022.

=== Other entrants ===
The following players received wildcards into the singles main draw:

- (Spain) Carlos Gimeno Valero
- (Austria) Dominic Thiem
- (Switzerland) Stan Wawrinka It was announced at the press conference that Stan Wawrinka, the former world number 3, would participate in ATP Challenger 125 in Puente Romano in Marbella. He achieved almost every possible milestone in professional tennis. Stan Wawrinka won three Grand Slam titles, 16 ATP titles and an Olympic gold in Beijing with Roger Federer in the men's doubles category.

The following players received entry into the singles main draw as alternates:

- (Argentina) Pedro Cachin
- Andrey Kuznetsov

The following players received entry from the qualifying draw:

- (Spain) Javier Barranco Cosano
- (Italy) Raúl Brancaccio
- (Spain) Carlos Gómez-Herrera
- (Slovakia) Lukáš Klein
- (Spain) Pol Martín Tiffon
- Alexander Shevchenko

The following player received entry as a lucky loser:

- (Spain) Nicolás Álvarez Varona

== Women's singles main-draw entrants ==
=== Seeds ===
Country	Player	Rank^{1}	Seed
MNE	Danka Kovinić	66	1
	Varvara Gracheva	71	2
EGY	Mayar Sherif	73	3
NED	Arantxa Rus	75	4
FRA	Clara Burel	82	5
HUN	Panna Udvardy	83	6
ITA	Martina Trevisan	88	7
SVK	Anna Karolína Schmiedlová	92	8

- ^{1} Rankings are as of 21 March 2022.

=== Other entrants ===
The following players received wildcards into the singles main draw:

- Elina Avanesyan
- (Spain) Irene Burillo Escorihuela
- (Spain) Andrea Lázaro García
- (Germany) Nastasja Schunk

The following players entered the main draw using a protected ranking:

- (Italy) Elisabetta Cocciaretto
- (Luxembourg) Mandy Minella

=== Withdrawals ===
Before the tournament

- (Italy) Lucia Bronzetti → replaced by (Germany) Tamara Korpatsch
- (Hungary) Dalma Gálfi → replaced by (Luxembourg) Mandy Minella
- (Slovakia) Kristína Kučová → replaced by (Poland) Katarzyna Kawa
- (Belgium) Greet Minnen → replaced by (Spain) Rebeka Masarova
- (Germany) Jule Niemeier → replaced by (China) Zhu Lin
- (France) Diane Parry → replaced by Anna Blinkova
- (Argentina) Nadia Podoroska → replaced by (Germany) Anna-Lena Friedsam
- (Belgium) Alison Van Uytvanck → replaced by (Georgia (country)) Ekaterine Gorgodze
- (Belgium) Maryna Zanevska → replaced by (Ukraine) Lesia Tsurenko
- (China) Zheng Saisai → replaced by (Serbia) Aleksandra Krunić

== Women's doubles main-draw entrants ==
=== Seeds ===
Country	Player	Country	Player	Rank^{1}	Seed
SRB	Aleksandra Krunić		Alexandra Panova	123	1
ROU	Irina Bara	GEO	Ekaterine Gorgodze	127	2

- Rankings are as of March 21, 2022

=== Other entrants ===
The following pairs received wildcards into the doubles main draw:

- (Spain) Rebeka Masarova / (Hungary) Panna Udvardy

== Champions ==
=== Men's singles ===
- (Spain) Jaume Munar def. (Argentina) Pedro Cachin 6–2, 6–2.

=== Women's singles ===
- (Egypt) Mayar Sherif def. (Germany) Tamara Korpatsch 7–6^{(7–1)}, 6–4

=== Men's doubles ===
- (Czech Republic) Roman Jebavý / (Austria) Philipp Oswald def. (Monaco) Hugo Nys / (Poland) Jan Zieliński 7–6^{(8–6)}, 3–6, [10–3].

=== Women's doubles ===
- (Romania) Irina Bara / (Georgia (country)) Ekaterine Gorgodze def. (Germany) Vivian Heisen / (Poland) Katarzyna Kawa 6–4, 3–6, [10–6]
