= 2022 Andalucía Challenger – Men's singles =

Men's singles
- 2022 Andalucía Challenger

Final
- Champion: (Spain) Jaume Munar
- Runner-up: (Argentina) Pedro Cachin
- Score: 6–2, 6–2

Events
Singles	men	women
Doubles	men	women
- Andalucía Challenger

Gianluca Mager was the defending champion but chose not to defend his title.

Jaume Munar won the title after defeating Pedro Cachin 6–2, 6–2 in the final.

== Seeds ==
1. (Austria) Dominic Thiem (first round)
2. (Slovakia) Alex Molčan (quarterfinals)
3. (Spain) Pablo Andújar (semifinals)
4. (Czech Republic) Jiří Veselý (semifinals)
5. (Spain) Roberto Carballés Baena (quarterfinals)
6. (Spain) Jaume Munar (champion)
7. (Italy) Marco Cecchinato (first round)
8. (Spain) Carlos Taberner (second round)

== Draw ==
Key

- Q = Qualifier
- WC = Wild card
- LL = Lucky loser
- Alt = Alternate
- ITF = ITF entry
- PR = Protected ranking
- SR = Special ranking
- SE = Special exempt
- JE = Junior exempt
- JR = Junior Accelerator Programme entrant
- CO = College Accelerator Programme entrant
- NG = Next Gen Accelerator Program entrant
- w/o = Walkover
- r = Retired
- d = Defaulted

=== Finals ===
Semifinals
Alt	(Argentina) Pedro Cachin	5	6	6
3	(Spain) Pablo Andújar	7	1	3
4	(Czech Republic) Jiří Veselý	3	4
6	(Spain) Jaume Munar	6	6

Final
Alt	(Argentina) Pedro Cachin	2	2
6	(Spain) Jaume Munar	6	6

=== Top half ===
First round
1/WC	(Austria) D Thiem	3	4
Alt	(Argentina) P Cachin	6	6
Q	(Spain) J Barranco Cosano	2	6^{3}
(France) M Guinard	6	7^{7}
(Germany) P Kohlschreiber	2	6	6
(Czech Republic) J Lehečka	6	2	1
Q	(Spain) C Gómez-Herrera	4	5
8	(Spain) C Taberner	6	7
3	(Spain) P Andújar	6	4	6
(Italy) A Pellegrino	1	6	2
(Spain) M Vilella Martínez	3	0
(Germany) Y Hanfmann	6	6
(Sweden) E Ymer	6	6
WC	(Switzerland) S Wawrinka	2	4
(Chinese Taipei) C-h Tseng	6	6^{5}	6
7	(Italy) M Cecchinato	2	7^{7}	3

Second round
Alt	(Argentina) P Cachin	6	6
(France) M Guinard	4	0
(Germany) P Kohlschreiber	4	6	6
8	(Spain) C Taberner	6	3	4
3	(Spain) P Andújar	6	6
(Germany) Y Hanfmann	4	0
(Sweden) E Ymer	4	5
(Chinese Taipei) C-h Tseng	6	7

Quarterfinals
Alt	(Argentina) P Cachin	7^{7}	6
(Germany) P Kohlschreiber	6^{5}	2
3	(Spain) P Andújar	6	6
(Chinese Taipei) C-h Tseng	2	4

Semifinals
Alt	(Argentina) P Cachin	5	6	6
3	(Spain) P Andújar	7	1	3

=== Bottom half ===
First round
5	(Spain) R Carballés Baena	6	7^{7}
(Serbia) N Milojević	3	6^{1}
(Italy) F Gaio	6	1
Q	(Spain) P Martín Tiffon	1	0^{r}
WC	(Spain) C Gimeno Valero	4	1
(Slovakia) N Gombos	6	6
Alt	A Kuznetsov	7^{7}	6^{3}	1
4	(Czech Republic) J Veselý	6^{2}	7^{7}	6
6	(Spain) J Munar	6	6
Q	A Shevchenko	2	2
LL	(Spain) N Álvarez Varona	7^{7}	6
Q	(Slovakia) L Klein	6^{5}	4
(Spain) B Zapata Miralles	6	6
Q	(Italy) R Brancaccio	3	4
(Italy) F Agamenone	3	6^{3}
2	(Slovakia) A Molčan	6	7^{7}

Second round
5	(Spain) R Carballés Baena	6	7^{7}
(Italy) F Gaio	4	6^{4}
(Slovakia) N Gombos	4	6^{5}
4	(Czech Republic) J Veselý	6	7^{7}
6	(Spain) J Munar	6	6
LL	(Spain) N Álvarez Varona	4	2
(Spain) B Zapata Miralles	3	6	6^{4}
2	(Slovakia) A Molčan	6	4	7^{7}

Quarterfinals
5	(Spain) R Carballés Baena	2	4
4	(Czech Republic) J Veselý	6	6
6	(Spain) J Munar	7^{7}	6
2	(Slovakia) A Molčan	6^{4}	2

Semifinals
4	(Czech Republic) J Veselý	3	4
6	(Spain) J Munar	6	6
