= 2019 Casino Admiral Trophy – Singles =

Singles
- 2019 Casino Admiral Trophy

Final
- Champion: (Spain) Pablo Andújar
- Runner-up: (France) Benoît Paire
- Score: 4–6, 7–6^{(8–6)}, 6–4

Events
Singles	Doubles
← 2018 ·	Casino Admiral Trophy	· 2020 →

Stefano Travaglia was the defending champion but chose not to defend his title.

Pablo Andújar won the title after defeating Benoît Paire 4–6, 7–6^{(8–6)}, 6–4 in the final.

== Seeds ==
All seeds receive a bye into the second round.

1. (France) Benoît Paire (final)
2. (Spain) Pablo Andújar (champion)
3. (Czech Republic) Jiří Veselý (quarterfinals)
4. (Portugal) Pedro Sousa (second round)
5. (Spain) Guillermo García López (third round)
6. (Brazil) Thiago Monteiro (quarterfinals)
7. (Spain) Adrián Menéndez Maceiras (second round)
8. (Argentina) Facundo Bagnis (second round)
9. (Italy) Simone Bolelli (third round)
10. (Spain) Pedro Martínez (semifinals)
11. (Italy) Filippo Baldi (third round)
12. (Italy) Alessandro Giannessi (quarterfinals)
13. (Italy) Andrea Arnaboldi (third round)
14. (Germany) Rudolf Molleker (second round)
15. (Spain) Alejandro Davidovich Fokina (semifinals)
16. (Belgium) Kimmer Coppejans (second round)

== Draw ==
=== Key ===
- Q = Qualifier
- WC = Wild card
- LL = Lucky loser
- Alt = Alternate
- SE = Special exempt
- PR = Protected ranking
- ITF = ITF entry
- JE = Junior exempt
- w/o = Walkover
- r = Retired
- d = Defaulted
- SR = Special ranking

=== Finals ===
Quarterfinals
1	(France) Benoît Paire	5	6	7^{9}
12	(Italy) Alessandro Giannessi	7	4	6^{7}
3	(Czech Republic) Jiří Veselý	4	6	1
10	(Spain) Pedro Martínez	6	3	6
6	(Brazil) Thiago Monteiro	4	6	1
15	(Spain) Alejandro Davidovich Fokina	6	3	6
(Italy) Gianluca Mager	3	2
2	(Spain) Pablo Andújar	6	6

Semifinals
1	(France) Benoît Paire	6^{7}	6	6
10	(Spain) Pedro Martínez	7^{9}	3	2
15	(Spain) Alejandro Davidovich Fokina	2	7	3
2	(Spain) Pablo Andújar	6	5	6

Final
1	(France) Benoît Paire	6	6^{6}	4
2	(Spain) Pablo Andújar	4	7^{8}	6

=== Top half ===
==== Section 1 ====
First round
(Argentina) P Cachin	6	3	6
(Netherlands) T de Bakker	2	6	4
Q	(Canada) S Diez	6	6
ITF	(Spain) O Roca Batalla	2	1
ITF	(Germany) Peter Heller	2	4
(France) E Couacaud	6	6
ITF	(Italy) R Brancaccio	5	6	6
WC	(Spain) C Gómez-Herrera	7	4	2

Second round
1	(France) B Paire	7^{7}	2	6
(Argentina) P Cachin	6^{3}	6	2
Q	(Canada) S Diez	6	6
16	(Belgium) K Coppejans	2	3
12	(Italy) A Giannessi	6	5	7^{7}
(France) E Couacaud	2	7	6^{4}
ITF	(Italy) R Brancaccio	6	7
7	(Spain) A Menéndez Maceiras	4	5

Third round
1	(France) B Paire	6	6
Q	(Canada) S Diez	1	6^{r}
12	(Italy) A Giannessi	4	7^{7}	6
ITF	(Italy) R Brancaccio	6	6^{4}	3

Quarterfinals
1	(France) B Paire	5	6	7^{9}
12	(Italy) A Giannessi	7	4	6^{7}

==== Section 2 ====
First round
(Italy) GM Moroni	6	6
WC	(Serbia) M Djokovic	3	0
(Spain) D Gimeno Traver	6	6
(Germany) K Krawietz	1	1
(Czech Republic) A Pavlásek	3	6	6^{5}
(Spain) B Zapata Miralles	6	3	7^{7}
(Spain) E López Pérez	7^{7}	7^{7}
(Italy) R Marcora	6^{4}	6^{3}

Second round
3	(Czech Republic) J Veselý	6	6
(Italy) GM Moroni	2	2
(Spain) D Gimeno Traver	3	4
13	(Italy) A Arnaboldi	6	6
10	(Spain) P Martínez	6	1
(Spain) B Zapata Miralles	2	0^{r}
(Spain) E López Pérez	6	5	5
5	(Spain) G García López	4	7	7

Third round
3	(Czech Republic) J Veselý	6	6
13	(Italy) A Arnaboldi	4	2
10	(Spain) P Martínez	3	6	6
5	(Spain) G García López	6	3	1

Quarterfinals
3	(Czech Republic) J Veselý	4	6	1
10	(Spain) P Martínez	6	3	6

=== Bottom half ===
==== Section 3 ====
First round
(Austria) J Rodionov	6	4	4
(Italy) M Donati	3	6	6
(France) C Hemery	4	6	6
ITF	(Spain) D Pérez Sanz	6	1	4
(Spain) T Robredo	2	6	3
(Italy) F Gaio	6	3	6
WC	(Spain) C Taberner	6	2	7
Alt	(Dominican Republic) J Hernández-Fernández	3	6	5

Second round
6	(Brazil) T Monteiro	7^{7}	6
(Italy) M Donati	6^{4}	4
(France) C Hemery	6^{2}	2
9	(Italy) S Bolelli	7^{7}	6
15	(Spain) A Davidovich Fokina	6	4	6
(Italy) F Gaio	3	6	3
WC	(Spain) C Taberner	6	1	6
4	(Portugal) P Sousa	3	6	4

Third round
6	(Brazil) T Monteiro	6	7^{7}
9	(Italy) S Bolelli	4	6^{4}
15	(Spain) A Davidovich Fokina	6	6
WC	(Spain) C Taberner	2	0

Quarterfinals
6	(Brazil) T Monteiro	4	6	1
15	(Spain) A Davidovich Fokina	6	3	6

==== Section 4 ====
First round
(Portugal) J Domingues	5	7^{7}	2
(Italy) G Mager	7	6^{5}	6
(Czech Republic) Z Kolář	6	6
WC	(Spain) J Barranco Cosano	3	4
Q	(Italy) R Bonadio	3^{r}
(Spain) M Vilella Martínez	5
(Spain) S Gutiérrez Ferrol	3	3
WC	(Austria) J Melzer	6	6

Second round
8	(Argentina) F Bagnis	6	4	0
(Italy) G Mager	2	6	6
(Czech Republic) Z Kolář	6^{4}	3
11	(Italy) F Baldi	7^{7}	6
14	(Germany) R Molleker	2	4
(Spain) M Vilella Martínez	6	6
WC	(Austria) J Melzer	4	4
2	(Spain) P Andújar	6	6

Third round
(Italy) G Mager	6	6
11	(Italy) F Baldi	4	2
(Spain) M Vilella Martínez	4	2
2	(Spain) P Andújar	6	6

Quarterfinals
(Italy) G Mager	3	2
2	(Spain) P Andújar	6	6
