= Marbella Tennis Open =

Tennis tournament in Spain (2018–2022)

Defunct tennis tournament
- Event name: Marbella Tennis Open
- Location: Marbella, Spain
- Venue: Club de Tenis Puente Romano
- Surface: Clay / Outdoors
- Website: Website

Current champions (2022)
- Men's singles: (Spain) Jaume Munar
- Women's singles: (Egypt) Mayar Sherif
- Men's doubles: (Czech Republic) Roman Jebavý (Austria) Philipp Oswald
- Women's doubles: (Romania) Irina Bara (Georgia (country)) Ekaterine Gorgodze
ATP Tour
- Category: ATP Challenger Tour (2018-2021), Challenger 125 (2022)
- Draw: 32S / 24Q / 16D
- Prize money: €134,920 (2022)
WTA Tour
- Category: WTA 125
- Draw: 32S / 8D
- Prize money: US$115,000 (2022)

The Marbella Tennis Open was a professional tennis tournament played on clay courts. It was part of the Association of Tennis Professionals (ATP) Challenger Tour and WTA 125K series. The ATP event was held annually in Marbella, Spain, from 2018 until 2022, and the WTA edition was held in 2022.

== Past finals ==
=== Men's singles ===
| Year | Champions | Runners-up | Score |
|---|---|---|---|
| 2018 | (Italy) Stefano Travaglia | (Argentina) Guido Andreozzi | 6–3, 6–3 |
| 2019 | (Spain) Pablo Andújar | (France) Benoît Paire | 4–6, 7–6^{(8–6)}, 6–4 |
| 2020 | (Spain) Pedro Martínez | (Spain) Jaume Munar | 7–6^{(7–4)}, 6–2 |
| 2021 | (Italy) Gianluca Mager | (Spain) Jaume Munar | 2–6, 6–3, 6–2 |
| 2022 | (Spain) Jaume Munar | (Argentina) Pedro Cachin | 6–2, 6–2 |

=== Women's singles ===
| Year | Champions | Runners-up | Score |
|---|---|---|---|
| 2022 | (Egypt) Mayar Sherif | (Germany) Tamara Korpatsch | 7–6^{(7–1)}, 6–4 |

=== Men's doubles ===
| Year | Champions | Runners-up | Score |
|---|---|---|---|
| 2018 | (Argentina) Guido Andreozzi (Uruguay) Ariel Behar | (Slovakia) Martin Kližan (Slovakia) Jozef Kovalík | 6–3, 6–4 |
| 2019 | (Germany) Kevin Krawietz (Germany) Andreas Mies | (Belgium) Sander Gillé (Belgium) Joran Vliegen | 7–6^{(8–6)}, 2–6, [10–6] |
| 2020 | (Spain) Gerard Granollers (Spain) Pedro Martínez | (Venezuela) Luis David Martínez (Brazil) Fernando Romboli | 6–3, 6–4 |
| 2021 | (United Kingdom) Dominic Inglot (Australia) Matt Reid | (Monaco) Romain Arneodo (Monaco) Hugo Nys | 1–6, 6–3, [10–6] |
| 2022 | (Czech Republic) Roman Jebavý (Austria) Philipp Oswald | (Monaco) Hugo Nys (Poland) Jan Zieliński | 7–6^{(8–6)}, 3–6, [10–3] |

=== Women's doubles ===
| Year | Champions | Runners-up | Score |
|---|---|---|---|
| 2022 | (Romania) Irina Bara (Georgia (country)) Ekaterine Gorgodze | (Germany) Vivian Heisen (Poland) Katarzyna Kawa | 6–4, 3–6, [10–6] |

== See also ==
- Andalucia Tennis Experience
