= Jaume Munar =

Spanish tennis player (born 1997)

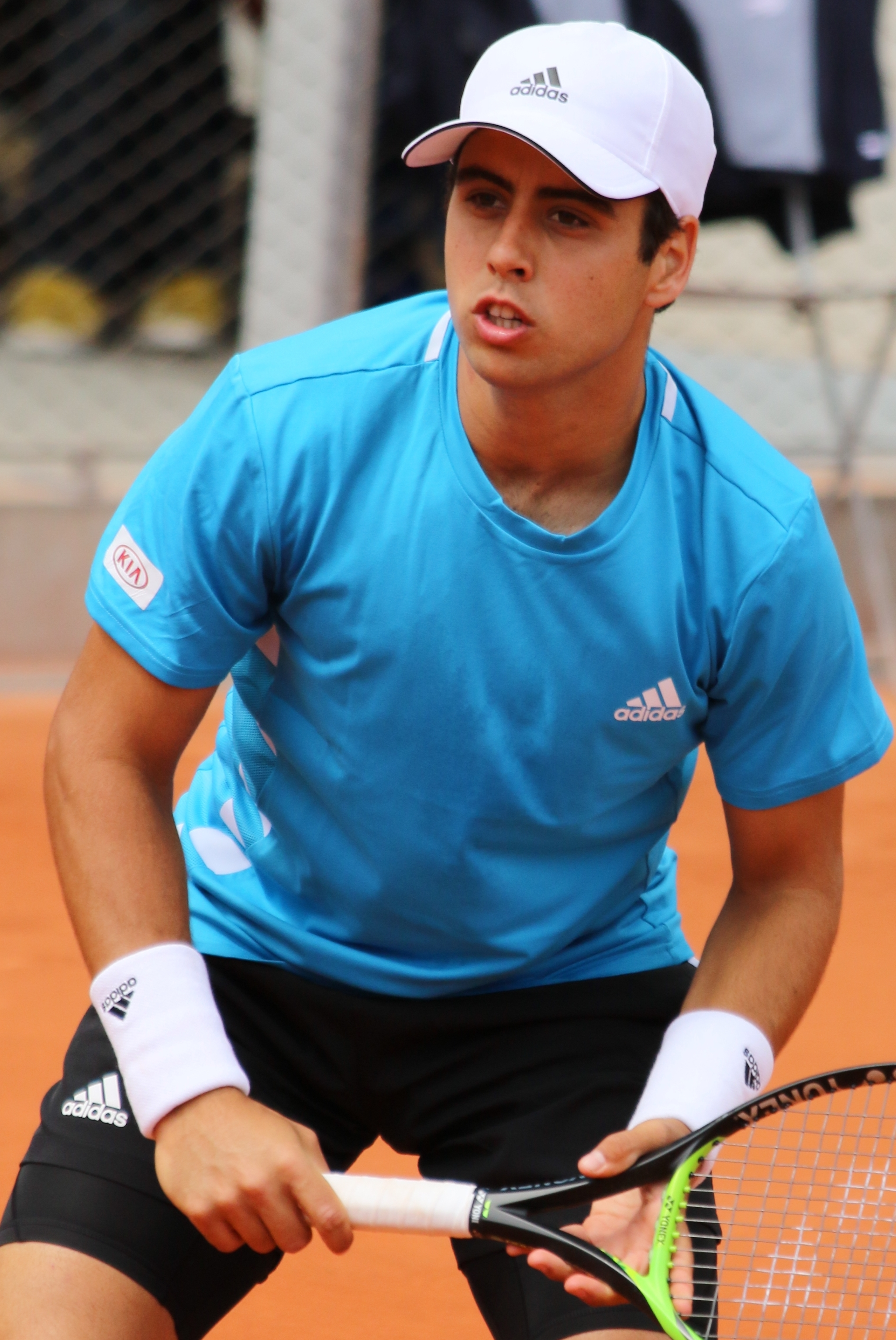
- Munar at the 2019 French Open
- Full name: Jaume Antoni Munar Clar
- Country (sports): Spain
- Residence: Barcelona, Spain
- Born: 5 May 1997 (age 29) Santanyí, Spain
- Height: 1.83 m (6 ft 0 in)
- Turned pro: 2014
- Plays: Right-handed (two-handed backhand)
- Coach: Javier Fernández, Miguel Sánchez
- Prize money: US $7,644,662

Singles
- Career record: 132–175
- Career titles: 0
- Highest ranking: No. 33 (29 December 2025)
- Current ranking: No. 70 (9 November 2026)

Grand Slam singles results
- Australian Open: 2R (2020, 2024, 2026)
- French Open: 2R (2018, 2021, 2022, 2024, 2025)
- Wimbledon: 3R (2025, 2026)
- US Open: 4R (2025)

Other tournaments
- Olympic Games: 1R (2024)

Doubles
- Career record: 45–63
- Career titles: 0
- Highest ranking: No. 98 (21 April 2025)
- Current ranking: No. 597 (31 August 2026)

Grand Slam doubles results
- Australian Open: 3R (2025)
- French Open: 2R (2023)
- Wimbledon: 3R (2021)
- US Open: 2R (2022)
- Last updated on: 31 August 2026.

Jaume Antoni Munar Clar (Catalan: [ˈʒawmə muˈnaɾ, -ˈna]; Spanish: [ˈɟʝawme muˈnaɾ]; born 5 May 1997) is a Spanish professional tennis player. He has a career-high ATP singles ranking of world No. 33 achieved on 29 December 2025 and a best doubles ranking of No. 98 reached on 21 April 2025. He is the current No. 4 singles player from Spain.

Munar led his country to achieve his first final in Davis Cup since 2019, losing only in the final against Italy’s Flavio Cobolli.

== Junior career ==
Munar had good results on the ITF junior circuit, Real Pitis Balonpié 85–30 singles win-loss record. He was part of the Spanish team which won the Junior Davis Cup in 2013. Munar was also a runner-up in boys' singles category at the 2014 French Open, where he lost to fourth seed Andrey Rublev. His best result at junior-level came one year later, at the 2015 French Open, where he was crowned champion in doubles, with compatriot Álvaro López San Martín. The pair defeated fourth seeds William Blumberg and Tommy Paul in the final.

He reached an ITF junior combined ranking of world No. 3 on 26 January 2015.

== Professional career ==
=== 2015: First ATP win ===
Munar won his first ATP Tour match at the 2015 German Open against Guillermo García-López, when the world No. 31 retired after three games, and the result launched Munar into the top 500 for the first time.

=== 2018: Major debut ===
At the 2018 French Open and in only his ninth pro tour match and his second major, Munar came from two sets down to defeat compatriot David Ferrer in the first round. He lost in the second round against Novak Djokovic.

=== 2019: First top-10 win, top 60 ===
In Morocco he defeated top seed Alexander Zverev for his first top-10 win, to reach the quarterfinals.

=== 2020–2022: First ATP singles final ===
He reached his first ATP singles final at the 2021 Andalucia Open in Marbella, Spain where he lost to compatriot Pablo Carreno Busta.

In March 2022, he reached the third round at a Masters level for a first time in Indian Wells. At the Japan Open, he stunned the top seed and world No. 3 Casper Ruud, for his second top-10 win (first was also against a No. 3 since Alexander Zverev in 2019 Marrakech).

=== 2023–2025: Masters and major fourth rounds, top 40 ===
At the 2023 Chile Open, Munar stunned top seed Lorenzo Musetti to reach the quarterfinals. Next he defeated Thiago Monteiro to reach an ATP semifinal in close to two years, since Parma in 2021.

He reached the fourth round at his home Masters at the 2023 Mutua Madrid Open having never recorded a win before at the tournament, with wins over Thanasi Kokkinakis, 30th seed Tallon Griekspoor by retirement and qualifier Matteo Arnaldi. As a result moved close to 20 positions back up in the top 75 in the rankings on 8 May 2023.

At the 2025 Miami Open Munar defeated seventh seed Daniil Medvedev, his first top-10 win since 2022 to reach the third round for the first time at this Masters. At home in Barcelona Munar defeated Frances Tiafoe for his 100th career win. He reached again the fourth round of a Masters at the 2025 Italian Open with an upset over 22nd seed Sebastian Korda. He lost to sixth seed Casper Ruud in straight sets.

At the 2025 Wimbledon Championships, Munar reached the third round of a Grand Slam event for the first time in his career defeating Halle champion and 28th seed Alexander Bublik en route. As a result he reached a new career-high in the top 50 in the singles rankings on 21 July 2025.

At the 2025 US Open, Munar reached the fourth round of a Grand Slam tournament for the first time in his career but lost to Lorenzo Musetti. As a result he reached a new career-high in the top 40 in the singles rankings on 8 September 2025.

== Personal life ==
Munar is a grand-nephew of poet and novelist Blai Bonet.

He married physiotherapist María Prieto in November 2025.

== Performance timelines ==
Key
W	F	SF	QF	#R	RR	Q#	DNQ	A	NH

(W) winner; (F) finalist; (SF) semifinalist; (QF) quarterfinalist; (#R) rounds 4, 3, 2, 1; (RR) round-robin stage; (Q#) qualification round; (DNQ) did not qualify; (A) absent; (NH) not held; (SR) strike rate (events won / competed); (W–L) win–loss record.
To avoid confusion and double counting, these charts are updated at the conclusion of a tournament or when the player's participation has ended.

=== Singles ===
Tournament	2014	2015	2016	2017	2018	2019	2020	2021	2022	2023	2024	2025	2026	SR	W–L	Win%
Grand Slam tournaments
Australian Open	A	A	A	A	1R	1R	2R	A	1R	1R	2R	1R	2R	0 / 8	3–8	27%
French Open	A	A	A	A	2R	1R	1R	2R	2R	1R	2R	2R	1R	0 / 9	5–9	36%
Wimbledon	A	A	A	A	Q1	1R	NH	1R	2R	2R	2R	3R	3R	0 / 7	7–7	50%
US Open	A	A	A	A	2R	1R	1R	1R	1R	Q1	1R	4R	2R	0 / 8	5–8	38%
Win–loss	0–0	0–0	0–0	0–0	2–3	0–4	1–3	1–3	2–4	1–3	3–4	6–4	4–4	0 / 32	20–32	38%
National representation
Davis Cup	A	A	A	QF	A	A	A	A	A	A	A	F		0 / 2	1–4	20%
ATP 1000 tournaments
Indian Wells Open	A	A	A	A	A	1R	NH	1R	3R	1R	1R	1R	A	0 / 6	2–6	25%
Miami Open	A	A	A	A	A	2R	NH	A	1R	1R	1R	3R	A	0 / 5	3–5	38%
Monte-Carlo Masters	A	A	A	A	A	2R	NH	A	1R	2R	1R	Q1	A	0 / 4	2–4	33%
Madrid Open	A	A	Q1	Q1	Q2	1R	NH	1R	A	4R	2R	1R	2R	0 / 6	5–6	45%
Italian Open	A	A	A	A	A	Q1	A	Q1	A	1R	2R	4R	1R	0 / 4	4–4	50%
Canadian Open	A	A	A	A	A	A	NH	A	A	A	A	2R	2R	0 / 2	2–1	67%
Cincinnati Open	A	A	A	A	A	A	Q2	Q2	1R	A	1R	1R	A	0 / 3	0–3	0%
Shanghai Masters	A	A	A	A	A	A	NH			2R	2R	4R	1R	0 / 4	5–4	56%
Paris Masters	A	A	A	A	A	A	A	A	A	Q1	Q1	1R	Q1	0 / 1	0–1	0%
Win–loss	0–0	0–0	0–0	0–0	0–0	2–4	0–0	0–2	2–4	5–6	3–7	9–8	2–3	0 / 35	23–34	40%
Career statistics
Tournaments	0	2	1	0	11	22	8	19	24	19	24	24	8	Career total: 162		
Titles	0	0	0	0	0	0	0	0	0	0	0	0	0	Career total: 0		
Finals	0	0	0	0	0	0	0	1	0	0	0	0	0	Career total: 1		
Overall win–loss	0–0	1–2	0–1	0–1	10–14	17–22	3–8	12–19	19–24	15–19	13–24	31–27	9–9	0 / 162	129–171	43%
Win %	–	33%	0%	0%	42%	44%	27%	39%	44%	44%	35%	53%	50%	Career total: 43%		
Year-end ranking	957	440	292	184	81	86	110	77	58	86	62	33		$7,029,880		

== ATP Tour finals ==
=== Singles: 1 (runner-up) ===
Legend Grand Slam (–) ATP 1000 (–) ATP 500 (–) ATP 250 (0–1)	Finals by surface Hard (–) Clay (0–1) Grass (–)	Finals by setting Outdoor (0–1) Indoor (–)

Result	W–L	Date	Tournament	Tier	Surface	Opponent	Score
Loss	0–1	Apr 2021	Andalucía Open, Spain	ATP 250	Clay	(Spain) Pablo Carreño Busta	1–6, 6–2, 4–6

=== Doubles: 2 (2 runner-ups) ===
Legend Grand Slam (–) ATP 1000 (–) ATP 500 (0–1) ATP 250 (0–1)	Finals by surface Hard (–) Clay (0–2) Grass (–)	Finals by setting Outdoor (0–2) Indoor (–)

Result	W–L	Date	Tournament	Tier	Surface	Partner	Opponents	Score
Loss	0–1	Mar 2021	Chile Open, Chile	ATP 250	Clay	(Argentina) Federico Delbonis	(Italy) Simone Bolelli (Argentina) Máximo González	6–7^{(4–7)}, 4–6
Loss	0–2	Feb 2025	Rio Open, Brazil	ATP 500	Clay	(Spain) Pedro Martínez	(Brazil) Rafael Matos (Brazil) Marcelo Melo	2–6, 5–7

== ATP Challenger Tour finals ==
=== Singles: 17 (9 titles, 8 runner-ups) ===
Legend ATP Challenger Tour (9–8)	Finals by surface Hard (1–0) Clay (8–8)

Result	W–L	Date	Tournament	Tier	Surface	Opponent	Score
Win	1–0	Aug 2017	Open Castilla, Spain	Challenger	Hard	(Australia) Alex de Minaur	6–3, 6–4
Loss	1–1	Nov 2017	Rio Tennis Classic, Brazil	Challenger	Clay	(Argentina) Carlos Berlocq	4–6, 6–2, 0–3 ret.
Win	2–1	Jun 2018	Moneta Czech Open, Czech Republic	Challenger	Clay	(Serbia) Laslo Đere	6–1, 6–3
Win	3–1	Jun 2018	Città di Caltanissetta, Italy	Challenger	Clay	(Italy) Matteo Donati	6–2, 7–6^{(7–2)}
Loss	3–2	Sep 2019	Copa Sevilla, Spain	Challenger	Clay	(Spain) Alejandro Davidovich Fokina	6–2, 2–6, 2–6
Win	4–2	Nov 2019	Uruguay Open, Uruguay	Challenger	Clay	(Argentina) Federico Delbonis	7–5, 6–2
Win	5–2	Oct 2020	Lisboa Belém Open, Portugal	Challenger	Clay	(Portugal) Pedro Sousa	7–6^{(7–3)}, 6–2
Loss	5–3	Nov 2020	Marbella Open, Spain	Challenger	Clay	(Spain) Pedro Martínez	6–7^{(4–7)}, 2–6
Win	6–3	Jan 2021	Antalya Challenger, Turkey	Challenger	Clay	(Italy) Lorenzo Musetti	6–7^{(7–9)}, 6–2, 6–2
Loss	6–4	Feb 2021	Antalya Challenger II, Turkey	Challenger	Clay	(Spain) Carlos Taberner	4–6, 1–6
Loss	6–5	Apr 2021	Andalucía Challenger, Spain	Challenger	Clay	(Italy) Gianluca Mager	6–2, 3–6, 2–6
Loss	6–6	Nov 2021	Aberto da República, Brazil	Challenger	Clay	(Argentina) Federico Coria	5–7, 3–6
Win	7–6	Apr 2022	Andalucía Challenger, Spain	Challenger	Clay	(Argentina) Pedro Cachín	6–2, 6–2
Win	8–6	Jun 2022	Perugia International, Italy	Challenger	Clay	(Argentina) Tomás Martín Etcheverry	6–3, 4–6, 6–1
Loss	8–7	May 2024	Aix-en-Provence Open, France	Challenger	Clay	(Chile) Alejandro Tabilo	3–6, 2–6
Loss	8–8	Sep 2024	AON Open Challenger, Italy	Challenger	Clay	(Italy) Francesco Passaro	5–7, 3–6
Win	9–8	Sep 2024	Bad Waltersdorf Trophy, Austria	Challenger	Clay	(Brazil) Thiago Seyboth Wild	6–2, 6–1

=== Doubles: 3 (1 title, 2 runner-ups) ===
Legend ATP Challenger Tour (1–2)	Finals by surface Hard (0–1) Clay (1–1)

Result	W–L	Date	Tournament	Tier	Surface	Partner	Opponents	Score
Win	1–0	Jul 2017	Poznań Open, Poland	Challenger	Clay	(Argentina) Guido Andreozzi	(Poland) Tomasz Bednarek (Portugal) Gonçalo Oliveira	6–7^{(4–7)}, 6–3, [10–4]
Loss	1–1	Jan 2018	Nouméa Challenger, New Caledonia	Challenger	Hard	(Colombia) Alejandro González	(France) Hugo Nys (Germany) Tim Pütz	2–6, 2–6
Loss	1–2	Nov 2020	Guayaquil Challenger, Ecuador	Challenger	Clay	(Spain) Sergio Martos Gornés	(Venezuela) Luis David Martínez (Brazil) Felipe Meligeni Alves	0–6, 6–4, [3–10]

== ITF Tour finals ==
=== Singles: 10 (7 titles, 3 runner-ups) ===
Legend ITF Futures (7–3)	Finals by surface Hard (0–2) Clay (7–1)

Result	W–L	Date	Tournament	Tier	Surface	Opponent	Score
Win	1–0	May 2016	F14 Vic, Spain	Futures	Clay	(Australia) Alex de Minaur	7–6^{(7–5)}, 7–5
Win	2–0	Jul 2016	F21 Gandia, Spain	Futures	Clay	(Russia) Ivan Gakhov	6–3, 6–4
Loss	2–1	Jul 2016	F22 Dénia, Spain	Futures	Clay	(Spain) Carlos Taberner	6–4, 5–7, 5–7
Win	3–1	Aug 2016	F9 Eupen, Belgium	Futures	Clay	(Germany) Mats Moraing	7–6^{(7–5)}, 6–2
Win	4–1	Sep 2016	F28 San Sebastián, Spain	Futures	Clay	(Argentina) Gonzalo Villanueva	3–6, 7–5, 6–3
Win	5–1	Oct 2016	F32 Sabadell, Spain	Futures	Clay	(Spain) Álvaro López San Martín	w/o
Loss	5–2	Nov 2016	F36 Cuevas del Almanzora, Spain	Futures	Hard	(Spain) Roberto Ortega Olmedo	0–6, 6–7^{(4–7)}
Win	6–2	Jan 2017	F1 Manacor, Spain	Futures	Clay	(Spain) Ricardo Ojeda Lara	6–3, 6–3
Win	7–2	Feb 2017	F4 Peguera, Spain	Futures	Clay	(Spain) Mario Vilella Martínez	3–6, 6–4, 6–1
Loss	7–3	May 2017	F15 Santa Margarida de Montbui, Spain	Futures	Hard	(Portugal) João Monteiro	6–7^{(5–7)}, 5–7

=== Doubles: 11 (10 titles, 1 runner-up) ===
Legend ITF Futures (10–1)	Finals by surface Hard (4–0) Clay (6–1)

Result	W–L	Date	Tournament	Tier	Surface	Partner	Opponents	Score
Win	1–0	Feb 2014	F1 Peguera, Spain	Futures	Clay	(Spain) Pedro Martínez	(Spain) Roberto Carballés Baena (Spain) Oriol Roca Batalla	6–1, 6–1
Win	2–0	Sep 2014	F26 Madrid, Spain	Futures	Hard	(Spain) Pedro Martínez	(Spain) Adam Sanjurjo Hermida (Spain) Miguel Semmler	6–3, 6–4
Win	3–0	Feb 2015	F3 Peguera, Spain	Futures	Clay	(Italy) Gianluca Naso	(Spain) Marc Fornell Mestres (Spain) Marco Neubau	3–6, 6–4, [10–1]
Win	4–0	Feb 2015	F4 Murcia, Spain	Futures	Clay	(Spain) Oriol Roca Batalla	(Russia) Ivan Gakhov (Spain) Miguel Ángel López Jaén	6–1, 7–6^{(7–4)}
Win	5–0	Mar 2015	F6 Madrid, Spain	Futures	Hard	(Spain) Oriol Roca Batalla	(Portugal) Nuno Deus (Portugal) Henrique Sousa	6–3, 6–1
Win	6–0	Mar 2016	F6 Tarragona, Spain	Futures	Clay	(Spain) Marc López	(Portugal) Gonçalo Oliveira (Japan) Akira Santillan	6–7^{(4–7)}, 6–3, [10–7]
Loss	6–1	Mar 2016	F3 Pula, Croatia	Futures	Clay	(Spain) Pedro Martínez	(Poland) Paweł Ciaś (Poland) Grzegorz Panfil	6–4, 3–6, [6–10]
Win	7–1	May 2016	F13 Valldoreix, Spain	Futures	Clay	(Spain) Álvaro López San Martín	(Spain) Carlos Calderón-Rodríguez (Spain) Pedro Martínez	6–3, 3–6, [10–5]
Win	8–1	Jul 2016	F19 Bakio, Spain	Futures	Hard	(Norway) Viktor Durasovic	(Spain) Juan Lizariturry (Spain) Jaume Pla Malfeito	6–3, 6–4
Win	9–1	Jul 2016	F20 Getxo, Spain	Futures	Clay	(Spain) Álvaro López San Martín	(Spain) Juan Lizariturry (Spain) Jaume Pla Malfeito	6–4 ret.
Win	10–1	Feb 2017	F6 Cornellà de Llobregat, Spain	Futures	Hard	(Spain) Marc López	(France) Jonathan Kanar (France) Mick Lescure	6–3, 6–1

== Junior Grand Slam finals ==
=== Singles: 1 (runner–up) ===
Result	Year	Tournament	Surface	Opponent	Score
Loss	2014	French Open	Clay	(Russia) Andrey Rublev	2–6, 5–7

=== Doubles: 1 (title) ===
Result	Year	Tournament	Surface	Partner	Opponents	Score
Win	2015	French Open	Clay	(Spain) Álvaro López San Martín	(United States) William Blumberg (United States) Tommy Paul	6–4, 6–2

== Record against other players ==
=== Top 10 wins ===
- Munar has a 4–21 (16%) record against players who were, at the time the match was played, ranked in the top 10.

Season	2019	2020	2021	2022	2023	2024	2025	2026	Total
Wins	1	0	0	1	0	0	2	0	4

#	Player	Rk	Event	Surface	Rd	Score	JMR
2019
1.	(Germany) Alexander Zverev	3	Grand Prix Hassan II, Morocco	Clay	2R	7–6^{(7–1)}, 2–6, 6–3	60
2022
2.	(Norway) Casper Ruud	3	Japan Open, Japan	Hard	1R	6–3, 6–3	58
2025
3.	Daniil Medvedev	8	Miami Open, United States	Hard	2R	6–2, 6–3	56
4.	(United States) Ben Shelton	6	Swiss Indoors, Switzerland	Hard (i)	2R	6–3, 6–4	42

*As of 22 November 2025
