= 2010 Andalucia Tennis Experience =

- Date: 5–11 April
- Edition: 2nd
- Category: WTA International
- Surface: Clay / outdoor
- Location: Marbella, Spain
- Venue: Club de Tenis Puente Romano

Champions

Singles
- (Italy) Flavia Pennetta

Doubles
- (Italy) Sara Errani / (Italy) Roberta Vinci
← 2009 ·	Andalucia Tennis Experience	· 2011 →

The 2010 Andalucia Tennis Experience was a women's tennis tournament played on outdoor clay courts. It was the 2nd edition of the Andalucia Tennis Experience, and an International-level tournament of the 2010 WTA Tour. The event took place at the Club de Tenis Puente Romano in Marbella, Spain, from 5 April until 11 April 2010. Second-seeded Flavia Pennetta won the singles title.

== Finals ==
=== Singles ===
(Italy) Flavia Pennetta defeated (Spain) Carla Suárez Navarro, 6–2, 4–6, 6–3

- It was Pennetta's first title of the year and 9th of her career.

=== Doubles ===
(Italy) Sara Errani / (Italy) Roberta Vinci defeated (Russia) Maria Kondratieva / (Kazakhstan) Yaroslava Shvedova, 6–4, 6–2

== Entrants ==
=== Seeds ===
Athlete	Nationality	Ranking*	Seeding
Victoria Azarenka	Belarus	7	1
Flavia Pennetta	Italy	13	2
Kim Clijsters	Belgium	16	3
Aravane Rezaï	France	21	4
María José Martínez Sánchez	Spain	27	5
Maria Kirilenko	Russia	30	6
Anabel Medina Garrigues	Spain	32	7
Carla Suárez Navarro	Spain	36	8

- Rankings and seedings are as of March 22, 2010.

=== Other entrants ===
The following players received wildcards into the main draw:

- (Spain) Estrella Cabeza Candela
- (Belgium) Kim Clijsters
- (Spain) Virginia Ruano Pascual

The following players received entry via qualifying:

- (Spain) Beatriz García Vidagany
- (Romania) Simona Halep
- (Spain) Laura Pous Tió
- (Netherlands) Arantxa Rus
- (Austria) Yvonne Meusburger (as a Lucky loser)
