= 2011 Andalucia Tennis Experience – Singles Qualifying =

This article displays the qualifying draw of the 2011 Andalucia Tennis Experience.

== Players ==
=== Seeds ===
1. (Italy) Maria Elena Camerin (qualifying competition)
2. (Spain) Nuria Llagostera Vives (second round)
3. (Austria) Yvonne Meusburger (second round)
4. (Netherlands) Michaëlla Krajicek (first round)
5. (Russia) Nina Bratchikova (qualifying competition)
6. (Romania) Irina-Camelia Begu (qualified)
7. (Russia) Alexandra Panova (second round)
8. (Italy) Corinna Dentoni (second round)

=== Qualifiers ===
1. (Germany) Mona Barthel
2. (Romania) Irina-Camelia Begu
3. (Spain) María-Teresa Torró-Flor
4. (Spain) Lara Arruabarrena-Vecino

== Qualifying draw ==
=== First qualifier ===
First Round
1	(Italy) Maria Elena Camerin	3	7^{7}	6
WC	(Spain) Pilar Domínguez-López	6	6^{5}	2
(Spain) Silvia Soler Espinosa	5	1
(Kazakhstan) Sesil Karatantcheva	7	6
(Italy) Anna Floris	4	0
(Germany) Mona Barthel	6	6
(Poland) Magda Linette	3	4
7	(Russia) Alexandra Panova	6	6

Second Round
1	(Italy) Maria Elena Camerin	6	6
(Kazakhstan) Sesil Karatantcheva	3	2
(Germany) Mona Barthel	6	6
7	(Russia) Alexandra Panova	3	1

Qualifying Competition
1	(Italy) Maria Elena Camerin	1	3
(Germany) Mona Barthel	6	6

=== Second qualifier ===
First Round
2	(Spain) Nuria Llagostera Vives	6	6
(Slovenia) Maša Zec Peškirič	3	4
(Romania) Ioana Raluca Olaru	7	0	3
(Ukraine) Mariya Koryttseva	5	6	6
(Russia) Arina Rodionova	5	5
(Israel) Julia Glushko	7	7
(France) Laura Thorpe	1	0
6	(Romania) Irina-Camelia Begu	6	6

Second Round
2	(Spain) Nuria Llagostera Vives	6	2	4
(Ukraine) Mariya Koryttseva	4	6	6
(Israel) Julia Glushko	4	0
6	(Romania) Irina-Camelia Begu	6	6

Qualifying Competition
(Ukraine) Mariya Koryttseva	3	2
6	(Romania) Irina-Camelia Begu	6	6

=== Third qualifier ===
First Round
3	(Austria) Yvonne Meusburger	6	2	7^{7}
(Romania) Mădălina Gojnea	4	6	6^{1}
(Colombia) Catalina Castaño	0	2
WC	(Spain) María-Teresa Torró-Flor	6	6
(Spain) Eva Fernández Brugués	4	7^{7}	6
(Russia) Vitalia Diatchenko	6	6^{1}	3
(Russia) Ekaterina Ivanova	3	6^{2}
8	(Italy) Corinna Dentoni	6	7^{7}

Second Round
3	(Austria) Yvonne Meusburger	4	5
WC	(Spain) María-Teresa Torró-Flor	6	7
(Spain) Eva Fernández Brugués	3	6	6
8	(Italy) Corinna Dentoni	6	2	4

Qualifying Competition
WC	(Spain) María-Teresa Torró-Flor	3	6	6
(Spain) Eva Fernández Brugués	6	4	1

=== Fourth qualifier ===
First Round
4	(Netherlands) Michaëlla Krajicek	6^{8}	3
WC	(Russia) Nanuli Pipiya	7^{10}	6
(Greece) Eleni Daniilidou	3	6	4
WC	(Spain) Lara Arruabarrena-Vecino	6	2	6
(Spain) Beatriz García Vidagany	6	3	2
(Romania) Elena Bogdan	4	6	6
(Croatia) Ana Vrljić	4	4
5	(Russia) Nina Bratchikova	6	6

Second Round
WC	(Russia) Nanuli Pipiya	2	2
WC	(Spain) Lara Arruabarrena-Vecino	6	6
(Romania) Elena Bogdan	6	4	0
5	(Russia) Nina Bratchikova	1	6	6

Qualifying Competition
WC	(Spain) Lara Arruabarrena-Vecino	2	6	6
5	(Russia) Nina Bratchikova	6	4	4
