= 2011 Andalucia Tennis Experience – Doubles =

Doubles
- 2011 Andalucia Tennis Experience

Final
- Champions: (Spain) Nuria Llagostera Vives (Spain) Arantxa Parra Santonja
- Runners-up: (Italy) Sara Errani (Italy) Roberta Vinci
- Score: 3–6, 6–4, [10–5]

Details
- Draw: 16
- Seeds: 4

Events
Singles	Doubles
← 2010 ·	Andalucia Tennis Experience

Sara Errani and Roberta Vinci were the defending champions but lost in the final to Nuria Llagostera Vives and Arantxa Parra Santonja, 3–6, 6–4, [10–5].

== Seeds ==
1. (Italy) Sara Errani / (Italy) Roberta Vinci (final)
2. (Poland) Klaudia Jans / (Poland) Alicja Rosolska (first round)
3. (Spain) Nuria Llagostera Vives / (Spain) Arantxa Parra Santonja (champions)
4. (Russia) Vitalia Diatchenko / (Romania) Monica Niculescu (semifinals)

== Draw ==
Key

- Q = Qualifier
- WC = Wild card
- LL = Lucky loser
- Alt = Alternate
- ITF = ITF entry
- PR = Protected ranking
- SR = Special ranking
- SE = Special exempt
- JE = Junior exempt
- JR = Junior Accelerator Programme entrant
- CO = College Accelerator Programme entrant
- NG = Next Gen Accelerator Program entrant
- w/o = Walkover
- r = Retired
- d = Defaulted

=== Draw ===
First round
1	(Italy) S Errani (Italy) R Vinci	6	6^{4}	[10]
(Ukraine) M Koryttseva (Romania) IR Olaru	4	7^{7}	[7]
(Italy) A Brianti (France) A Védy	4	1
(Italy) ME Camerin (Romania) S Cîrstea	6	6
4	(Russia) V Diatchenko (Romania) M Niculescu	6^{4}	6	[10]
(Romania) A Dulgheru (Netherlands) M Krajicek	7^{7}	4	[6]
(Sweden) J Larsson (Austria) Y Meusburger	6^{3}	2
WC	(Spain) B García Vidagany (Spain) S Soler Espinosa	7^{7}	6
(Bosnia and Herzegovina) M Jugić-Salkić (Croatia) D Jurak	6	6
(Turkey) İ Şenoğlu (Czech Republic) K Zakopalová	3	4
(Greece) E Daniilidou (Russia) A Panova	6	2	[6]
3	(Spain) N Llagostera Vives (Spain) A Parra Santonja	4	6	[10]
(Germany) K Barrois (Germany) J Wöhr	6	3	[10]
WC	(Spain) L Domínguez Lino (Spain) L Pous Tió	3	6	4
(Russia) D Safina (Hungary) Á Szávay	6	6
2	(Poland) K Jans (Poland) A Rosolska	1	1

Quarterfinals
1	(Italy) S Errani (Italy) R Vinci	6	6
(Italy) ME Camerin (Romania) S Cîrstea	3	2
4	(Russia) V Diatchenko (Romania) M Niculescu	6	6
WC	(Spain) B García Vidagany (Spain) S Soler Espinosa	3	1
(Bosnia and Herzegovina) M Jugić-Salkić (Croatia) D Jurak	3	4
3	(Spain) N Llagostera Vives (Spain) A Parra Santonja	6	6
(Germany) K Barrois (Germany) J Wöhr	6	2	[9]
(Russia) D Safina (Hungary) Á Szávay	3	6	[11]

Semifinals
1	(Italy) S Errani (Italy) R Vinci	2	7^{7}	[10]
4	(Russia) V Diatchenko (Romania) M Niculescu	6	6^{2}	5
3	(Spain) N Llagostera Vives (Spain) A Parra Santonja	3
(Russia) D Safina (Hungary) Á Szávay	2^{r}

Final
1	(Italy) S Errani (Italy) R Vinci	6	4	[5]
3	(Spain) N Llagostera Vives (Spain) A Parra Santonja	3	6	[10]
