= 2010 Andalucia Tennis Experience – Singles =

Singles
- 2010 Andalucia Tennis Experience

Final
- Champion: (Italy) Flavia Pennetta
- Runner-up: (Spain) Carla Suárez Navarro
- Score: 6–2, 4–6, 6–3.

Events
Singles	Doubles
← 2009 ·	Andalucia Tennis Experience	· 2011 →

Jelena Janković was the defending champion, but chose not to participate that year.

Flavia Pennetta defeated Carla Suárez Navarro 6–2, 4–6, 6–3 to win the 2010 title.

This is notable for being the first main draw appearance of future world No. 1 and Grand Slam champion Simona Halep where she lost in the quarterfinals to Flavia Pennetta.

== Seeds ==
1. (Belarus) Victoria Azarenka (quarterfinals, retired due to a left thigh injury)
2. (Italy) Flavia Pennetta (champion)
3. (Belgium) Kim Clijsters (second round)
4. (France) Aravane Rezaï (second round)
5. (Spain) María José Martínez Sánchez (semifinals)
6. (Russia) Maria Kirilenko (first round)
7. (Spain) Anabel Medina Garrigues (second round)
8. (Spain) Carla Suárez Navarro (final)

== Draw ==
=== Key ===
- Q = Qualifier
- WC = Wild card
- LL = Lucky loser
- Alt = Alternate
- SE = Special exempt
- PR = Protected ranking
- ITF = ITF entry
- JE = Junior exempt
- w/o = Walkover
- r = Retired
- d = Defaulted
- SR = Special ranking

=== Finals ===
Semifinals
5	(Spain) María José Martínez Sánchez	6	3	2
8	(Spain) Carla Suárez Navarro	2	6	6
(Italy) Sara Errani	1	1
2	(Italy) Flavia Pennetta	6	6

Final
8	(Spain) Carla Suárez Navarro	2	6	3
2	(Italy) Flavia Pennetta	6	4	6

=== Top half ===
First round
1	(Belarus) V Azarenka	6	6
LL	(Austria) Y Meusburger	3	0
WC	(Spain) E Cabeza Candela	1	7	6
(Croatia) P Martić	6	6^{3}	2
(France) J Coin	2	0
(Italy) A Brianti	6	6
(Switzerland) S Vögele	4	3
5	(Spain) MJ Martínez Sánchez	6	6
4	(France) A Rezaï	6	6
WC	(Spain) V Ruano Pascual	1	1
(Germany) T Malek	6	6
(Czech Republic) S Záhlavová	4	0
(Slovenia) P Hercog	6	6
(Romania) IR Olaru	3	4
(Italy) R Vinci	4	0
8	(Spain) C Suárez Navarro	6	6

Second round
1	(Belarus) V Azarenka	6	6
WC	(Spain) E Cabeza Candela	2	4
(Italy) A Brianti	0	2
5	(Spain) MJ Martínez Sánchez	6	6
4	(France) A Rezaï	4	2
(Germany) T Malek	6	6
(Slovenia) P Hercog	4	6^{2}
8	(Spain) C Suárez Navarro	6	7

Quarterfinals
1	(Belarus) V Azarenka	4	r
5	(Spain) MJ Martínez Sánchez	0
(Germany) T Malek	6	1	2
8	(Spain) C Suárez Navarro	4	6	6

Semifinals
5	(Spain) MJ Martínez Sánchez	6	3	2
8	(Spain) C Suárez Navarro	2	6	6

=== Bottom half ===
First round
7	(Spain) A Medina Garrigues	6	6
(Spain) A Parra Santonja	1	4
(Italy) S Errani	6	6
Q	(Netherlands) A Rus	1	2
(Germany) K Barrois	5	4
Q	(Spain) B García Vidagany	7	6
(Romania) A Dulgheru	4	7	2
3/WC	(Belgium) K Clijsters	6	6^{1}	6
6	(Russia) M Kirilenko	6	6^{2}	4
(Romania) S Cîrstea	4	7	6
Q	(Romania) S Halep	6	6
(Czech Republic) I Benešová	4	1
(Belgium) K Flipkens	1	3
Q	(Spain) L Pous Tió	6	6
(Kazakhstan) Y Shvedova	3	1
2	(Italy) F Pennetta	6	6

Second round
7	(Spain) A Medina Garrigues	1	6^{1}
(Italy) S Errani	6	7
Q	(Spain) B García Vidagany	7	4	6
3/WC	(Belgium) K Clijsters	5	6	4
(Romania) S Cîrstea	4	6^{4}
Q	(Romania) S Halep	6	7
Q	(Spain) L Pous Tió	2	2
2	(Italy) F Pennetta	6	6

Quarterfinals
(Italy) S Errani	6^{5}	6	6
Q	(Spain) B García Vidagany	7	4	3
Q	(Romania) S Halep	4	6^{4}
2	(Italy) F Pennetta	6	7

Semifinals
(Italy) S Errani	1	1
2	(Italy) F Pennetta	6	6
