= 2011 Andalucia Tennis Experience =

- Date: 2–10 April
- Edition: 3rd
- Category: WTA International
- Prize money: $220,000
- Surface: Clay / outdoor
- Location: Marbella, Spain
- Venue: Club de Tenis Puente Romano

Champions

Singles
- (Belarus) Victoria Azarenka

Doubles
- (Spain) Nuria Llagostera Vives / (Spain) Arantxa Parra Santonja
← 2010 ·	Andalucia Tennis Experience

The 2011 Andalucia Tennis Experience was a tennis tournament played on outdoor clay courts. It was the third and last edition of the Andalucia Tennis Experience, and an International-level tournament of the 2011 WTA Tour. The event took place at the Club de Tenis Puente Romano in Marbella, Spain, from 2 April through 10 April 2011.

The field was led by top seed Victoria Azarenka. She was joined by former world no. 1 Russian Dinara Safina and two-time Grand Slam champion Svetlana Kuznetsova. Defending champion Flavia Pennetta and finalist of the past two years Carla Suárez Navarro were also on set to join the field before they withdrew.

== Finals ==
=== Singles ===
(Belarus) Victoria Azarenka defeated (Romania) Irina-Camelia Begu, 6–3, 6–2

- It was Azarenka's second title of the year and the seventh of her career.

=== Doubles ===
(Spain) Nuria Llagostera Vives / (Spain) Arantxa Parra Santonja defeated (Italy) Sara Errani / (Italy) Roberta Vinci, 3–6, 6–4, [10–5]

== Prize money and points distribution ==
=== Points distribution ===
Stage	Women's singles	Women's doubles
Champion	280	
Runner up	200	
Semifinals	120	
Quarterfinals	70	
Round of 16	30	1
Round of 32	1	–
Qualifier	16	–
Qualifying final round	10	–
Qualifying second round	6	–
Qualifying first round	1	–

=== Prize money ===
The total commitment prize money for this year's event is US $220.000.

Stage	Women's singles	Women's doubles (per team)
Champion	$37,000	$11,000
Runner up	$19,000	$5,750
Semifinals	$10,200	$3,100
Quarterfinals	$5,340	$1,650
Round of 16	$2,950	$860
Round of 32	$1,725	–
Qualifying final round	$860	–
Qualifying second round	$460	–
Qualifying first round	$265	–

== Entrants ==
=== Seeds ===
Country	Player	Rank^{1}	Seed
BLR	Victoria Azarenka	8	1
RUS	Svetlana Kuznetsova	15	2
FRA	Aravane Rezaï	24	3
ROU	Alexandra Dulgheru	28	4
BUL	Tsvetana Pironkova	34	5
CZE	Klára Zakopalová	36	6
ITA	Roberta Vinci	37	7
ITA	Sara Errani	40	8

- Rankings and seedings are as of March 21, 2011.

=== Other entrants ===
The following players received wildcards into the main draw:

- (Russia) Dinara Safina
- (Russia) Svetlana Kuznetsova
- (Spain) Estrella Cabeza Candela

The following players received entry via qualifying:

- (Germany) Mona Barthel
- (Romania) Irina-Camelia Begu
- (Spain) María-Teresa Torró-Flor
- (Spain) Lara Arruabarrena-Vecino

=== Notable withdrawals ===
The following players withdrew from the tournament for various reasons:

- (Italy) Flavia Pennetta (torn shoulder muscle)
- (Serbia) Ana Ivanovic (fatigue)
- (Spain) Carla Suárez Navarro (right elbow surgery)
