= 2009 Andalucia Tennis Experience – Doubles =

Doubles
- 2009 Andalucia Tennis Experience

Final
- Champion: (Poland) Klaudia Jans (Poland) Alicja Rosolska
- Runner-up: (Spain) Anabel Medina Garrigues (Spain) Virginia Ruano Pascual
- Score: 6–3, 6–3

Details
- Draw: 16
- Seeds: 4

Events
| Singles | Doubles |
- Andalucia Tennis Experience

The doubles event at the 2009 Andalucia Tennis Experience was won by Klaudia Jans and Alicja Rosolska.

== Seeds ==
1. (Spain) Anabel Medina Garrigues / (Spain) Virginia Ruano Pascual (finals)
2. (Poland) Klaudia Jans / (Poland) Alicja Rosolska (champions)
3. (Estonia) Maret Ani / (Czech Republic) Renata Voráčová (semifinals)
4. (United Kingdom) Sarah Borwell / (South Africa) Natalie Grandin (first round)

== Draw ==
Key

- Q = Qualifier
- WC = Wild card
- LL = Lucky loser
- Alt = Alternate
- ITF = ITF entry
- PR = Protected ranking
- SR = Special ranking
- SE = Special exempt
- JE = Junior exempt
- JR = Junior Accelerator Programme entrant
- CO = College Accelerator Programme entrant
- NG = Next Gen Accelerator Program entrant
- w/o = Walkover
- r = Retired
- d = Defaulted

=== Finals ===
First round
1 | (Spain) A Medina Garrigues (Spain) V Ruano Pascual | 7 | 6
(France) S Cohen-Aloro (Italy) T Garbin | 5 | 3
(Italy) F Schiavone (Italy) R Vinci | 6 | 6
WC | (Spain) E Cabeza-Candela (Argentina) ME Salerni | 4 | 2
4 | (United Kingdom) S Borwell (South Africa) N Grandin | 6^{4} | 3
(Romania) S Cîrstea (Romania) IR Olaru | 7 | 6
(Russia) E Ivanova (Slovenia) M Zec Peškirič | 4 | 3
(Slovenia) P Hercog (Czech Republic) V Uhlířová | 6 | 6
(France) S Brémond (France) P Parmentier | 6 | 7
(Italy) S Errani (Slovakia) J Husárová | 3 | 5
(Estonia) K Kanepi (Bulgaria) T Pironkova | 6 | 3 | [7]
3 | (Estonia) M Ani (Czech Republic) R Voráčová | 3 | 6 | [10]
(Ukraine) Y Beygelzimer (Ukraine) V Kapshay | 5 | 6 | [10]
(Russia) M Kondratieva (France) S Lefèvre | 7 | 2 | [6]
(Slovenia) A Klepač (Tunisia) S Sfar | 4 | 2
2 | (Poland) K Jans (Poland) A Rosolska | 6 | 6

Quarterfinals
1 | (Spain) A Medina Garrigues (Spain) V Ruano Pascual | 6 | 6^{6} | [10]
(Italy) F Schiavone (Italy) R Vinci | 2 | 7 | [5]
(Romania) S Cîrstea (Romania) IR Olaru | 0 | 1
(Slovenia) P Hercog (Czech Republic) V Uhlířová | 6 | 6
(France) S Brémond (France) P Parmentier | 6^{5} | 5
3 | (Estonia) M Ani (Czech Republic) R Voráčová | 7 | 7
(Ukraine) Y Beygelzimer (Ukraine) V Kapshay | 4 | 1
2 | (Poland) K Jans (Poland) A Rosolska | 6 | 6

Semifinals
1 | (Spain) A Medina Garrigues (Spain) V Ruano Pascual | 6 | 6
(Slovenia) P Hercog (Czech Republic) V Uhlířová | 3 | 1
3 | (Estonia) M Ani (Czech Republic) R Voráčová | 6^{8} | 6 | [3]
2 | (Poland) K Jans (Poland) A Rosolska | 7 | 3 | [10]

Final
1 | (Spain) A Medina Garrigues (Spain) V Ruano Pascual | 3 | 3
2 | (Poland) K Jans (Poland) A Rosolska | 6 | 6
