= 2009 Andalucia Tennis Experience =

- Date: 6-12 April
- Edition: 1st
- Category: WTA International
- Draw: 32S / 16D
- Prize money: $500,000
- Surface: Clay / outdoor
- Location: Marbella, Spain
- Venue: Club de Tenis Puente Romano

Champions

Singles
- (Serbia) Jelena Janković

Doubles
- (Poland) Klaudia Jans / (Poland) Alicja Rosolska
- Andalucia Tennis Experience

The 2009 Andalucia Tennis Experience was a women's tennis tournament played on outdoor clay courts. It was the inaugural edition of the Andalucia Tennis Experience, and was an International-level tournament of the 2009 WTA Tour. The event took place at the Club de Tenis Puente Romano in Marbella, Spain, from 6 April until 12 April 2009. Second-seeded Jelena Janković won the singles title.

== Finals ==
=== Singles ===
(Serbia) Jelena Janković defeated (Spain) Carla Suárez Navarro, 6–3, 3–6, 6–3

- It was Jankovic's first singles title of the year and 10th of her career.

=== Doubles ===
(Poland) Klaudia Jans / (Poland) Alicja Rosolska defeated (Spain) Anabel Medina Garrigues / (Spain) Virginia Ruano Pascual, 6–3, 6–3
