= 2021 Andalucía Open =

- Date: 5–11 April
- Edition: 1st
- Category: ATP Tour 250
- Draw: 28S / 16D
- Prize money: €408,800
- Surface: Clay
- Location: Marbella, Spain
- Venue: Club de Tennis Puente Romano

Champions

Singles
- (Spain) Pablo Carreño Busta

Doubles
- (Uruguay) Ariel Behar / (Ecuador) Gonzalo Escobar
- Andalucía Open

The 2021 Andalucía Open (also known as the AnyTech365 Andalucía Open for sponsorship reasons) was a tournament on the 2021 ATP Tour. It was played on outdoor clay courts in Marbella, Spain. It was organised with a single-year licence in 2021, and was held at Club de Tennis Puente Romano from April 5 to 11, 2021. It was the first edition of the AnyTech365 Andalucía Open, which became the fourth ATP Tour tournament in Spain, alongside competitions in Madrid, Barcelona and Mallorca. It was also the fourth edition of the Challenger 80 tournament held in Puente Romano in Marbella the week prior to the ATP 250 event.

== Champions ==
=== Singles ===
- (Spain) Pablo Carreño Busta def. (Spain) Jaume Munar, 6–1, 2–6, 6–4

=== Doubles ===
- (Uruguay) Ariel Behar / (Ecuador) Gonzalo Escobar def. (Bosnia and Herzegovina) Tomislav Brkić / (Serbia) Nikola Ćaćić, 6–2, 6–4

== Points and prize money ==
=== Point distribution ===
Event	W	F	SF	QF	Round of 16	Round of 32	Q	Q2	Q1
Singles	250	150	90	45	20	0	12	6	0
Doubles	250	150	90	45	0	—N/a	—N/a	—N/a	—N/a

=== Prize money ===
Event	W	F	SF	QF	Round of 16	Round of 32	Q2	Q1
Singles	€40,100	€28,750	€20,465	€13,650	€8,770	€5,275	€2,580	€1,340
Doubles*	€14,970	€10,730	€7,060	€4,590	€2,690	—N/a	—N/a	—N/a

_{*per team}

== Singles main-draw entrants ==
=== Seeds ===
Country	Player	Rank^{1}	Seed
ESP	Pablo Carreño Busta	15	1
ITA	Fabio Fognini	17	2
NOR	Casper Ruud	25	3
ESP	Albert Ramos Viñolas	47	4
ESP	Alejandro Davidovich Fokina	55	5
ESP	Feliciano López	64	6
KOR	Kwon Soon-woo	79	7
ARG	Federico Delbonis	80	8

- ^{1} Rankings are as of March 29, 2021

=== Other entrants ===
The following players received wildcards into the main draw:

- (Spain) Carlos Alcaraz
- (Italy) Fabio Fognini
- (Denmark) Holger Rune

The following players received entry from the qualifying draw:

- (Switzerland) Henri Laaksonen
- (Serbia) Nikola Milojević
- (Spain) Mario Vilella Martínez
- (Spain) Bernabé Zapata Miralles

=== Withdrawals ===
Before the tournament

- (Spain) Pablo Andújar → replaced by (Kazakhstan) Mikhail Kukushkin
- (Spain) Roberto Bautista Agut → replaced by (Argentina) Facundo Bagnis
- (France) Richard Gasquet → replaced by (Argentina) Francisco Cerúndolo
- (South Africa) Lloyd Harris → replaced by (Slovakia) Norbert Gombos
- (Serbia) Dušan Lajović → replaced by (Japan) Taro Daniel
- (United Kingdom) Cameron Norrie → replaced by (Spain) Roberto Carballés Baena
- (Australia) Alexei Popyrin → replaced by (Belarus) Ilya Ivashka
- (Russia) Andrey Rublev → replaced by (Bosnia and Herzegovina) Damir Džumhur
- (Switzerland) Stan Wawrinka → replaced by (Spain) Pedro Martínez

== Doubles main-draw entrants ==
=== Seeds ===
Country	Player	Country	Player	Rank^{1}	Seed
BEL	Sander Gillé	BEL	Joran Vliegen	74	1
NZL	Marcus Daniell	AUT	Philipp Oswald	78	2
ESA	Marcelo Arévalo	NED	Matwé Middelkoop	97	3
AUS	Luke Saville	AUS	John-Patrick Smith	107	4

- Rankings are as of March 22, 2021.

=== Other entrants ===
The following pairs received wildcards into the doubles main draw:

- (Spain) Feliciano López / (Spain) Marc López
- (Spain) David Marrero / (Spain) Adrián Menéndez Maceiras

=== Withdrawals ===
Before the tournament

- (Brazil) Marcelo Demoliner / (Mexico) Santiago González → replaced by (Mexico) Santiago González / (Mexico) Miguel Ángel Reyes-Varela
- (United Kingdom) Cameron Norrie / (Australia) Matt Reid → replaced by (Lithuania) Ričardas Berankis / (New Zealand) Artem Sitak
