= 2010 Andalucia Tennis Experience – Doubles =

Doubles
- 2010 Andalucia Tennis Experience

Final
- Champions: (Italy) Sara Errani (Italy) Roberta Vinci
- Runners-up: (Russia) Maria Kondratieva (Kazakhstan) Yaroslava Shvedova
- Score: 6–4, 6–2

Events
Singles	Doubles
- Andalucia Tennis Experience

Klaudia Jans and Alicja Rosolska were the holders of a championship title; however, they chose not to play together.

Jans chose to play with Vladimíra Uhlířová, and Rosolska participated with Marta Domachowska. They met in the second round, and the unseeded pair won in three sets (2–6, 6–4, [11–9]). Rosolska and Domachowska were defeated by Maria Kondratieva and Yaroslava Shvedova in the semifinals.

Sara Errani and Roberta Vinci won in the final 6–4, 6–2, against Kondratieva and Shvedova.

== Seeds ==
1. (Poland) Klaudia Jans / (Czech Republic) Vladimíra Uhlířová (quarterfinals)
2. (Spain) Virginia Ruano Pascual / (United States) Meghann Shaughnessy (semifinals)
3. (Italy) Sara Errani / (Italy) Roberta Vinci (winner)
4. (Spain) Anabel Medina Garrigues / (Spain) Carla Suárez Navarro (first round)

== Draw ==
Key

- Q = Qualifier
- WC = Wild card
- LL = Lucky loser
- Alt = Alternate
- ITF = ITF entry
- PR = Protected ranking
- SR = Special ranking
- SE = Special exempt
- JE = Junior exempt
- JR = Junior Accelerator Programme entrant
- CO = College Accelerator Programme entrant
- NG = Next Gen Accelerator Program entrant
- w/o = Walkover
- r = Retired
- d = Defaulted

=== Draw ===
First round
1	(Poland) K Jans (Czech Republic) V Uhlířová	6	6
WC	(Spain) E Cabeza Candela (Spain) L Pous Tió	2	4
(Croatia) D Jurak (Austria) S Klemenschits	2	5
(Poland) M Domachowska (Poland) A Rosolska	6	7
4	(Spain) A Medina Garrigues (Spain) C Suárez Navarro	4	7	[11]
(Spain) L Domínguez Lino (Spain) A Parra Santonja	6	6^{3}	[13]
(Greece) E Daniilidou (Germany) J Wöhr	6	3	[3]
(Russia) M Kondratieva (Kazakhstan) Y Shvedova	1	6	[10]
(Slovenia) P Hercog (Croatia) P Martić	7	6
WC	(Spain) L Costas-Moreira (Spain) B García Vidagany	5	2
(Czech Republic) I Benešová (France) S Foretz	4	3
3	(Italy) S Errani (Italy) R Vinci	6	6
(France) S Lefèvre (Romania) M Niculescu	6	4	[10]
(Germany) K Barrois (Romania) IR Olaru	3	6	[7]
(Germany) T Malek (Tunisia) S Sfar	6	5	[10]
2	(Spain) V Ruano Pascual (United States) M Shaughnessy	2	7	[12]

Quarterfinals
1	(Poland) K Jans (Czech Republic) V Uhlířová	6	4	[9]
(Poland) M Domachowska (Poland) A Rosolska	2	6	[11]
(Spain) L Domínguez Lino (Spain) A Parra Santonja	0	4
(Russia) M Kondratieva (Kazakhstan) Y Shvedova	6	6
(Slovenia) P Hercog (Croatia) P Martić	6^{5}	6^{2}
3	(Italy) S Errani (Italy) R Vinci	7	7
(France) S Lefèvre (Romania) M Niculescu	2	4
2	(Spain) V Ruano Pascual (United States) M Shaughnessy	6	6

Semifinals
(Poland) M Domachowska (Poland) A Rosolska	3	4
(Russia) M Kondratieva (Kazakhstan) Y Shvedova	6	6
3	(Italy) S Errani (Italy) R Vinci	6	7
2	(Spain) V Ruano Pascual (United States) M Shaughnessy	4	5

Finals
(Russia) M Kondratieva (Kazakhstan) Y Shvedova	4	2
3	(Italy) S Errani (Italy) R Vinci	6	6
