= 2019 Internazionali di Tennis Emilia Romagna – Doubles =

Doubles
- 2019 Internazionali di Tennis Emilia Romagna

Final
- Champions: (Lithuania) Laurynas Grigelis (Italy) Andrea Pellegrino
- Runners-up: (Uruguay) Ariel Behar (Ecuador) Gonzalo Escobar
- Score: 1–6, 6–3, [10–7]

Events
Singles	Doubles
- Internazionali di Tennis Emilia Romagna

This was the first edition of the tournament.

Laurynas Grigelis and Andrea Pellegrino won the title after defeating Ariel Behar and Gonzalo Escobar 1–6, 6–3, [10–7] in the final.

== Seeds ==
1. (Brazil) Fernando Romboli / (Italy) Andrea Vavassori (quarterfinals)
2. (Uruguay) Ariel Behar / (Ecuador) Gonzalo Escobar (final)
3. (Sweden) André Göransson / (Netherlands) Sem Verbeek (quarterfinals)
4. (Uruguay) Martín Cuevas / (Venezuela) Roberto Maytín (first round)

== Draw ==
Key

- Q = Qualifier
- WC = Wild card
- LL = Lucky loser
- Alt = Alternate
- ITF = ITF entry
- PR = Protected ranking
- SR = Special ranking
- SE = Special exempt
- JE = Junior exempt
- JR = Junior Accelerator Programme entrant
- CO = College Accelerator Programme entrant
- NG = Next Gen Accelerator Program entrant
- w/o = Walkover
- r = Retired
- d = Defaulted

First round
1	(Brazil) F Romboli (Italy) A Vavassori	6	6
(Poland) K Drzewiecki (Poland) S Walków	3	2
WC	(Italy) A Basso (Italy) E Dalla Valle	6	3	[10]
(Croatia) T Draganja (Italy) J Ocleppo	3	6	[5]
3	(Sweden) A Göransson (Netherlands) S Verbeek	6	6
WC	(Italy) Riccardo Balzerani (Italy) F Forti	4	1
(Lithuania) L Grigelis (Italy) A Pellegrino	6	7^{7}
Alt	(Australia) Jacob Grills (United States) M Schnur	4	6^{3}
(Australia) M Banes (Brazil) G Clezar	3	2
(Italy) A Bega (Argentina) A Collarini	6	6
Alt	(Italy) J Berrettini (Italy) R Brancaccio	7	1	[12]
4	(Uruguay) M Cuevas (Venezuela) R Maytín	5	6	[10]
ITF	(Italy) R Bonadio (Belgium) Christopher Heyman	6	6
WC	(Italy) Lorenzo Frigerio (Italy) A Virgili	4	4
ITF	(Italy) M Bortolotti (Australia) S Puodziunas	1	6^{5}
2	(Uruguay) A Behar (Ecuador) G Escobar	6	7^{7}

Quarterfinals
1	(Brazil) F Romboli (Italy) A Vavassori	3	7	[6]
WC	(Italy) A Basso (Italy) E Dalla Valle	6	5	[10]
3	(Sweden) A Göransson (Netherlands) S Verbeek	6	1	[5]
(Lithuania) L Grigelis (Italy) A Pellegrino	3	6	[10]
(Italy) A Bega (Argentina) A Collarini	4	7^{8}	[6]
Alt	(Italy) J Berrettini (Italy) R Brancaccio	6	6^{6}	[10]
ITF	(Italy) R Bonadio (Belgium) C Heyman	3	3
2	(Uruguay) A Behar (Ecuador) G Escobar	6	6

Semifinals
WC	(Italy) A Basso (Italy) E Dalla Valle	2	5
(Lithuania) L Grigelis (Italy) A Pellegrino	6	7
Alt	(Italy) J Berrettini (Italy) R Brancaccio	1	1
2	(Uruguay) A Behar (Ecuador) G Escobar	6	6

Final
(Lithuania) L Grigelis (Italy) A Pellegrino	1	6	[10]
2	(Uruguay) A Behar (Ecuador) G Escobar	6	3	[7]
