= 2011 Andalucia Tennis Experience – Singles =

Singles
- 2011 Andalucia Tennis Experience

Final
- Champions: (Belarus) Victoria Azarenka
- Runners-up: (Romania) Irina-Camelia Begu
- Score: 6–3, 6–2

Details
- Draw: 32
- Seeds: 8

Events
Singles	Doubles
← 2010 ·	Andalucia Tennis Experience

Flavia Pennetta was the defending champion but withdrew due to a torn shoulder muscle.
Victoria Azarenka won in the final against Irina-Camelia Begu, 6–3, 6–2.

== Seeds ==
1. (Belarus) Victoria Azarenka (champion)
2. (Russia) Svetlana Kuznetsova (semifinals)
3. (France) Aravane Rezaï (first round)
4. (Romania) Alexandra Dulgheru (quarterfinals)
5. (Bulgaria) Tsvetana Pironkova (second round)
6. (Czech Republic) Klára Zakopalová (quarterfinals)
7. (Italy) Roberta Vinci (first round)
8. (Italy) Sara Errani (semifinals)

== Draw ==
Key

- Q = Qualifier
- WC = Wild card
- LL = Lucky loser
- Alt = Alternate
- ITF = ITF entry
- PR = Protected ranking
- SR = Special ranking
- SE = Special exempt
- JE = Junior exempt
- JR = Junior Accelerator Programme entrant
- CO = College Accelerator Programme entrant
- NG = Next Gen Accelerator Program entrant
- w/o = Walkover
- r = Retired
- d = Defaulted

=== Finals ===
Semifinals
1	(Belarus) Victoria Azarenka	6	6
8	(Italy) Sara Errani	2	1
Q	(Romania) Irina-Camelia Begu	3	7^{7}	6
2/WC	(Russia) Svetlana Kuznetsova	6	6^{3}	4

Final
1	(Belarus) Victoria Azarenka	6	6
Q	(Romania) Irina-Camelia Begu	3	2

=== Top half ===
First round
1	(Belarus) V Azarenka	6	6
(Spain) A Parra Santonja	2	3
(Slovenia) P Hercog	1	2
(Spain) L Pous Tió	6	6
(Netherlands) A Rus	6	2	4
WC	(Russia) D Safina	3	6	6
Q	(Spain) M-T Torró-Flor	2	2
5	(Bulgaria) T Pironkova	6	6
4	(Romania) A Dulgheru	7^{7}	6^{5}	7
(Russia) A Pivovarova	6^{3}	7^{7}	5
(Czech Republic) I Benešová	0	2
(Spain) A Medina Garrigues	6	6
(Germany) K Barrois	6	7
(Belgium) K Flipkens	3	5
(Romania) S Cîrstea	6	4	2
8	(Italy) S Errani	1	6	6

Second round
1	(Belarus) V Azarenka	6	6
(Spain) L Pous Tió	3	2
WC	(Russia) D Safina	6	6
5	(Bulgaria) T Pironkova	3	4
4	(Romania) A Dulgheru	5	6	6
(Spain) A Medina Garrigues	7	4	4
(Germany) K Barrois	1	2
8	(Italy) S Errani	6	6

Quarterfinals
1	(Belarus) V Azarenka	5
WC	(Russia) D Safina	1^{r}
4	(Romania) A Dulgheru	2	2
8	(Italy) S Errani	6	6

Semifinals
1	(Belarus) V Azarenka	6	6
8	(Italy) S Errani	2	1

=== Bottom half ===
First round
6	(Czech Republic) K Zakopalová	1	7	6
(Belarus) A Yakimova	6	5	3
(Germany) A Kerber	4	6	3
(Spain) L Domínguez Lino	6	3	6
Q	(Romania) I-C Begu	6	6
(Italy) A Brianti	4	1
WC	(Spain) E Cabeza Candela	6	6
3	(France) A Rezaï	3	0
7	(Italy) R Vinci	5	3
(Czech Republic) S Záhlavová	7	6
Q	(Spain) L Arruabarrena-Vecino	7	6
(Romania) M Niculescu	5	4
(Sweden) J Larsson	1	1
(Hungary) Á Szávay	6	6
Q	(Germany) M Barthel	6	6^{4}	4
2/WC	(Russia) S Kuznetsova	4	7^{7}	6

Second round
6	(Czech Republic) K Zakopalová	7^{7}	1	7^{7}
(Spain) L Domínguez Lino	6^{3}	6	6^{0}
Q	(Romania) I-C Begu	7	6
WC	(Spain) E Cabeza Candela	5	0
(Czech Republic) S Záhlavová	5	6	3
Q	(Spain) L Arruabarrena-Vecino	7	3	6
(Hungary) Á Szávay	7^{7}	1	2
2/WC	(Russia) S Kuznetsova	6^{2}	6	6

Quarterfinals
6	(Czech Republic) K Zakopalová	3	3
Q	(Romania) I-C Begu	6	6
Q	(Spain) L Arruabarrena-Vecino	1	2
2/WC	(Russia) S Kuznetsova	6	6

Semifinals
Q	(Romania) I-C Begu	3	7^{7}	6
2/WC	(Russia) S Kuznetsova	6	6^{3}	4
