= Ariel Behar =

Uruguayan professional tennis player (born 1989)

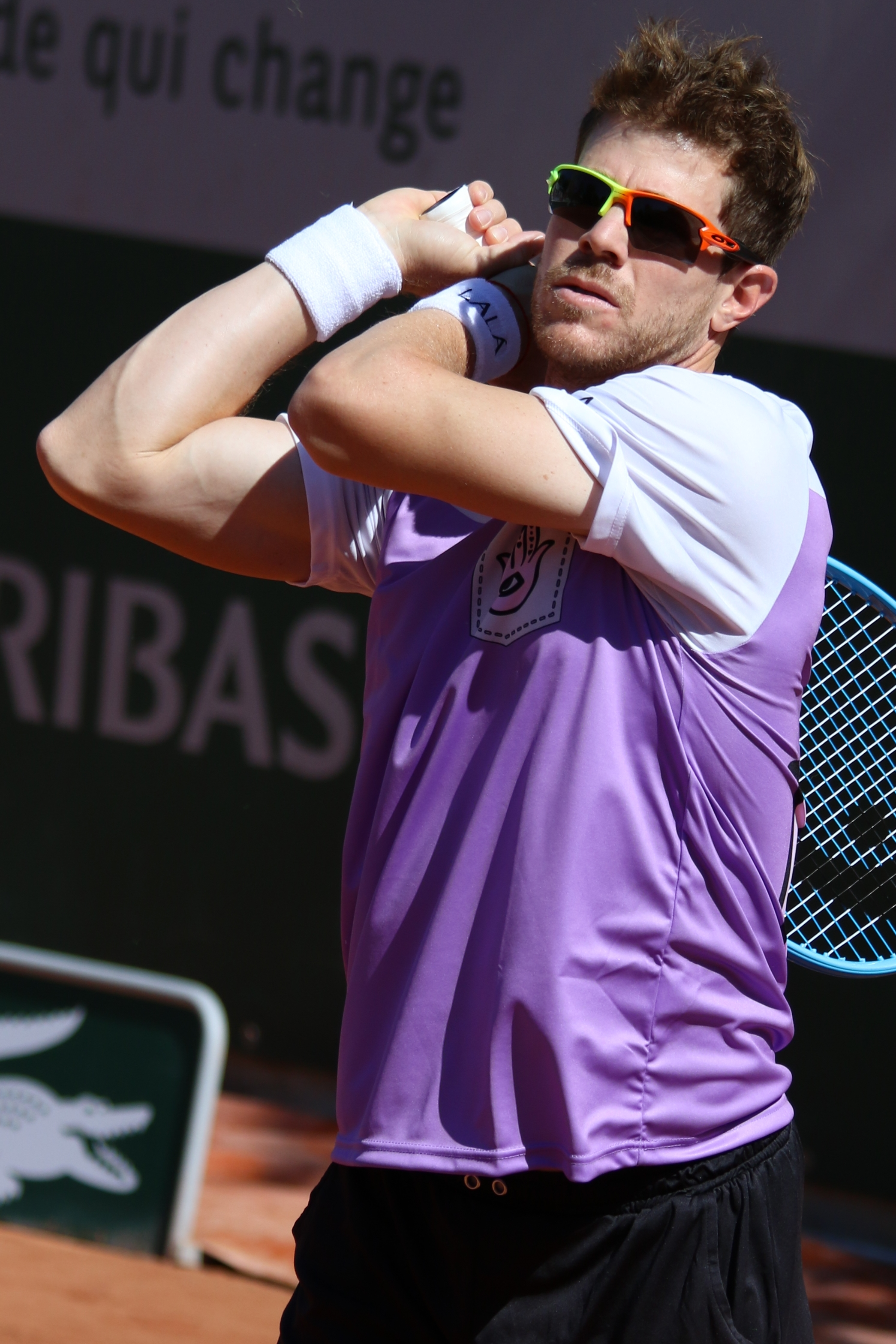
- Behar at the 2021 French Open
- Country (sports): Uruguay
- Residence: Buenos Aires, Argentina
- Born: 12 November 1989 (age 36) Montevideo, Uruguay
- Height: 1.80 m (5 ft 11 in)
- Turned pro: 2006
- Plays: Right Handed (Double Handed Both Sides)
- Prize money: US $1,498,458

Singles
- Career record: 1–5
- Career titles: 0
- Highest ranking: No. 823 (17 February 2014)

Doubles
- Career record: 137–162
- Career titles: 3
- Highest ranking: No. 34 (6 May 2024)
- Current ranking: No. 93 (16 February 2026)

Grand Slam doubles results
- Australian Open: QF (2024)
- French Open: 2R (2022, 2023)
- Wimbledon: QF (2023)
- US Open: 3R (2022)

Grand Slam mixed doubles results
- Australian Open: 2R (2023)
- French Open: 2R (2024)
- Wimbledon: 1R (2021, 2022)
- Last updated on: 28 February 2026.

Ariel Behar (Spanish pronunciation: [aˈɾjel βeˈaɾ]; (Note: In isolation, Behar is pronounced [beˈaɾ].) born November 12, 1989) is a Uruguayan professional tennis player who specializes in doubles. He has a career-high ATP doubles ranking of world No. 34 achieved on 6 May 2024. He has won three ATP Tour doubles titles, all of them with Ecuadorian Gonzalo Escobar.

Behar represents Uruguay at the Davis Cup since 2009.

== Personal life ==
Behar played tennis for the first time at 3 years old and began playing seriously aged 10. Growing up, he admired Roger Federer and Andre Agassi. He is from a Jewish family but is "not a big fan" of religion.

== Professional career ==
=== 2012–2017: ATP and Grand Slam singles debut ===
Since the mid 2010s till 2017, Behar competed primarily on the ATP Challenger Tour, where he won 7 doubles titles.

Partnering with Aliaksandr Bury, he was a semifinalist at the 2017 Estoril Open.

He entered the main draw at the 2017 Wimbledon Championships, his first appearance at a Grand Slam.

=== 2018–2022: Three doubles titles, 15 Challenger titles, top 40 ===
Partnering with Ecuadorian Gonzalo Escobar, Behar won two ATP titles at the 2021 Delray Beach Open and the 2021 Andalucía Open and reached three other finals on the ATP tour in 2021 after winning two ATP Challenger Tour titles together in 2020. The pair won a total of eight Challenger titles between 2018 and 2020. Behar entered the top 50 following the final at the 2021 Serbia Open on 26 April 2021. He finished the year 2021 ranked No. 41, a career-high year-end doubles ranking and reached his career-high doubles ranking of No. 39 on 31 January 2022 following the 2022 Australian Open. Also in 2022, he reached a fourth final and won his third ATP 250 title with Escobar at the 2022 Serbia Open defeating top seeds Nikola Mektić and Mate Pavić.

=== 2023: Wimbledon quarterfinal, two ATP finals, back to top 50 ===
At the 2023 Córdoba Open he reached the quarterfinals with Nicolas Barrientos. At the next Golden swing tournament he reached the final at the 2023 Argentina Open also with Barrientos where they lost to Simone Bolelli/Fabio Fognini.

At the 2023 French Open he won his first round match with new partner Adam Pavlásek over Albert Ramos Viñolas and Bernabe Zapata Miralles. At the 2023 Wimbledon Championships he reached the quarterfinals of a Major for the first time with Adam Pavlásek defeating former Wimbledon champions, ninth seeded pair of Nikola Mektić and Mate Pavić before losing to eventual champions Wesley Koolhof and Neal Skupski. As a result he returned to the top 50 on 17 July 2023.

He reached his tenth ATP final and second of the season with Pavlasek at the 2023 European Open but lost to the Tsitsipas brothers.

=== 2024: Australian Open quarterfinal and Madrid final, top 35 ===
At the 2024 Australian Open he made the quarterfinals with Pavlasek. The Uruguayan-Czech team upset fifth seeds Santiago González and Neal Skupski in three sets to advance and face next, first time doubles quarterfinalists newly formed Chinese-Czech duo of Zhang Zhizhen and Tomáš Macháč. As a result he returned the top 40 in the rankings on 29 January 2024.

Ranked No. 39 at the 2024 Mutua Madrid Open, he reached his first Masters final with Pavlasek, defeating tenth seeds Marcelo Arévalo and Mate Pavić, third seeds Joe Salisbury and Neal Skupski, 15th seeds Nathaniel Lammons and Jackson Withrow and second seeds Marcel Granollers and Horacio Zeballos by walkover. As a result he reached the top 35 in the rankings on 6 May 2024. They lost in the final to Sebastian Korda and Jordan Thompson.

Partnering with Robert Galloway, he was runner-up at the Japan Open, losing to British duo, Julian Cash and Lloyd Glasspool, in the final.

== ATP 1000 tournaments finals ==
=== Doubles: 1 (runner-up) ===
Result	Year	Tournament	Surface	Partner	Opponents	Score
Loss	2024	Madrid Open	Clay	(Czech Republic) Adam Pavlásek	(United States) Sebastian Korda (Australia) Jordan Thompson	3–6, 6–7^{(7–9)}

== ATP Tour finals ==
=== Doubles: 16 (3 titles, 13 runner-ups) ===
Legend Grand Slam (–) ATP 1000 (0–1) ATP 500 (0–2) ATP 250 (3–10)	Finals by surface Hard (1–4) Clay (2–6) Grass (0–3)	Finals by setting Outdoor (3–11) Indoor (0–2)

Result	W–L	Date	Tournament	Tier	Surface	Partner	Opponents	Score
Win	1–0	Jan 2021	Delray Beach Open, US	ATP 250	Hard	(Ecuador) Gonzalo Escobar	(United States) Christian Harrison (United States) Ryan Harrison	6–7^{(5–7)}, 7–6^{(7–4)}, [10–4]
Loss	1–1	Mar 2021	Argentina Open, Argentina	ATP 250	Clay	(Ecuador) Gonzalo Escobar	(Bosnia and Herzegovina) Tomislav Brkić (Serbia) Nikola Ćaćić	3–6, 5–7
Win	2–1	Apr 2021	Andalucía Open, Spain	ATP 250	Clay	(Ecuador) Gonzalo Escobar	(Bosnia and Herzegovina) Tomislav Brkić (Serbia) Nikola Ćaćić	6–2, 6–4
Loss	2–2	Apr 2021	Serbia Open, Serbia	ATP 250	Clay	(Ecuador) Gonzalo Escobar	(Croatia) Ivan Sabanov (Croatia) Matej Sabanov	3–6, 6–7^{(5–7)}
Loss	2–3	Jun 2021	Stuttgart Open, Germany	ATP 250	Grass	(Ecuador) Gonzalo Escobar	(Brazil) Marcelo Demoliner (Mexico) Santiago González	6–4, 3–6, [8–10]
Loss	2–4	Jan 2022	Adelaide International, Australia	ATP 250	Hard	(Ecuador) Gonzalo Escobar	(Netherlands) Wesley Koolhof (United Kingdom) Neal Skupski	6–7^{(5–7)}, 4–6
Win	3–4	Apr 2022	Serbia Open, Serbia	ATP 250	Clay	(Ecuador) Gonzalo Escobar	(Croatia) Nikola Mektić (Croatia) Mate Pavić	6–2, 3–6, [10–7]
Loss	3–5	Jun 2022	Mallorca Championships, Spain	ATP 250	Grass	(Ecuador) Gonzalo Escobar	(Brazil) Rafael Matos (Spain) David Vega Hernández	6–7^{5–7}, 7–6^{8–6}, [1–10]
Loss	3–6	Feb 2023	Argentina Open, Argentina	ATP 250	Clay	(Colombia) Nicolás Barrientos	(Italy) Simone Bolelli (Italy) Fabio Fognini	2–6, 4–6
Loss	3–7	Oct 2023	European Open, Belgium	ATP 250	Hard (i)	(Czech Republic) Adam Pavlásek	(Greece) Petros Tsitsipas (Greece) Stefanos Tsitsipas	7–6^{(7–5)}, 4–6, [8–10]
Loss	3–8	Apr 2024	Madrid Open, Spain	ATP 1000	Clay	(Czech Republic) Adam Pavlásek	(United States) Sebastian Korda (Australia) Jordan Thompson	3–6, 6–7^{(7–9)}
Loss	3–9	Oct 2024	Japan Open, Japan	ATP 500	Hard	(United States) Robert Galloway	(United Kingdom) Julian Cash (United Kingdom) Lloyd Glasspool	4–6, 6–4, [10–12]
Loss	3–10	Feb 2025	Dallas Open, US	ATP 500	Hard (i)	(United States) Robert Galloway	(United States) Christian Harrison (United States) Evan King	6–7^{(4–7)}, 6–7^{(4–7)}
Loss	3–11	May 2025	Geneva Open, Switzerland	ATP 250	Clay	(Belgium) Joran Vliegen	(France) Sadio Doumbia (France) Fabien Reboul	7–6^{(7–4)}, 4–6, [9–11]
Loss	3–12	Jun 2025	Eastbourne International, UK	ATP 250	Grass	(Belgium) Joran Vliegen	(United Kingdom) Julian Cash (United Kingdom) Lloyd Glasspool	4–6, 6–7^{(5–7)}
Loss	3–13	Feb 2026	Chile Open, Chile	ATP 250	Clay	(Australia) Matthew Romios	(Brazil) Orlando Luz (Brazil) Rafael Matos	4–6, 3–6

== ATP Challenger and ITF Tour finals ==
=== Doubles: 65 (32–33) ===
Legend ATP Challenger Tour (28–27) ITF Futures (4–6)	Finals by surface Hard (6–6) Clay (26–27)

Result	W–L	Date	Tournament	Tier	Surface	Partner	Opponents	Score
Loss	0–1	Oct 2009	Venezuela F7, Barquisimeto	Futures	Clay	(Peru) Mauricio Echazú	(Paraguay) Francisco Carbajal (Colombia) Eduardo Struvay	5–7, 6–1, [4–10]
Loss	0–2	Oct 2009	Venezuela F8, Caracas	Futures	Hard	(Paraguay) Francisco Carbajal	(Venezuela) Piero Luisi (Venezuela) Román Recarte	4–6, 6–3, [9–11]
Loss	0–3	Oct 2009	Venezuela F9, Caracas	Futures	Hard	(Peru) Mauricio Echazú	(Venezuela) Luis David Martínez (Venezuela) Yohny Romero	6–7^{(5–7)}, 5–7
Win	1–3	Jan 2011	Brazil F2, Salvador	Futures	Clay	(Italy) Matteo Volante	(Paraguay) José Benítez (Paraguay) Daniel Alejandro López Cassaccia	6–3, 6–2
Loss	1–4	Jan 2011	Brazil F5, João Pessoa	Futures	Clay	(Venezuela) Luis David Martínez	(Brazil) Marcelo Demoliner (United Kingdom) Morgan Phillips	3–6, 5–7
Win	2–4	Aug 2011	Ecuador F5, Guayaquil	Futures	Hard	(Argentina) Guido Andreozzi	(Colombia) Alejandro González (Colombia) Felipe Mantilla	7–6^{(11–9)}, 4–6, [10–8]
Win	3–4	Jan 2012	Bucaramanga, Colombia	Challenger	Clay	(Argentina) Horacio Zeballos	(Spain) Miguel Ángel López Jaén (Italy) Paolo Lorenzi	6–4, 7–6^{(7–5)}
Loss	3–5	Mar 2012	Salinas, Ecuador	Challenger	Clay	(Colombia) Carlos Salamanca	(Argentina) Martín Alund (Argentina) Horacio Zeballos	3–6, 3–6
Win	4–5	Aug 2012	Colombia F2, Medellín	Futures	Clay	(Peru) Duilio Beretta	(Colombia) Nicolás Barrientos (Colombia) Michael Quintero	2–1 ret.
Loss	4–6	Oct 2012	Villa Allende, Argentina	Challenger	Clay	(Argentina) Guillermo Durán	(Argentina) Facundo Bagnis (Argentina) Diego Junqueira	1–6, 2–6
Loss	4–7	Nov 2012	São Leopoldo, Brazil	Challenger	Clay	(Argentina) Horacio Zeballos	(Brazil) Fabiano de Paula (Brazil) Júlio Silva	1–6, 6–7^{(5–7)}
Loss	4–8	Jul 2013	France F12, Bourg-en-Bresse	Futures	Clay	(Spain) Carlos Poch Gradin	(Belgium) Germain Gigounon (Belgium) Yannik Reuter	4–6, 6–3, [4–10]
Win	5–8	Jun 2014	Košice, Slovakia	Challenger	Clay	(Argentina) Facundo Argüello	(Poland) Andriej Kapaś (Poland) Błażej Koniusz	6–4, 7–6^{(7–4)}
Loss	5–9	Dec 2014	Chile F12, Santiago	Futures	Clay	(Chile) Gonzalo Lama	(Chile) Julio Peralta (Chile) Hans Podlipnik Castillo	6–7^{(3–7)}, 2–6
Win	6–9	Jul 2015	Scheveningen, Netherlands	Challenger	Clay	(Brazil) Eduardo Dischinger	(Russia) Aslan Karatsev (Russia) Andrey Kuznetsov	ret.
Win	7–9	Jul 2015	Belgium F8, Middelkerke	Futures	Hard	(Netherlands) Sander Arends	(Belgium) Sander Gillé (Belgium) Joran Vliegen	6–7^{(1–7)}, 6–4, [10–7]
Win	8–9	Feb 2016	Santo Domingo, Dominican Republic	Challenger	Clay	(Ecuador) Giovanni Lapentti	(France) Jonathan Eysseric (Croatia) Franko Škugor	7–5, 6–4
Win	9–9	Jun 2016	Poprad-Tatry, Slovakia	Challenger	Clay	(Kazakhstan) Andrey Golubev	(Czech Republic) Lukáš Dlouhý (Slovakia) Andrej Martin	6–2, 5–7, [10–5]
Loss	9–10	Aug 2016	Liberec, Czech Republic	Challenger	Clay	(Croatia) Dino Marcan	(France) Jonathan Eysseric (Brazil) André Ghem	0–6, 4–6
Loss	9–11	Sep 2016	Seville, Spain	Challenger	Clay	(Spain) Enrique López Pérez	(Spain) Íñigo Cervantes Huegun (Spain) Oriol Roca Batalla	2–6, 5–6 ret.
Loss	9–12	Oct 2016	Orléans, France	Challenger	Hard (i)	(Belarus) Andrei Vasilevski	(Croatia) Nikola Mektić (Croatia) Franko Škugor	2–6, 5–7
Loss	9–13	Oct 2016	Lima, Peru	Challenger	Clay	(Chile) Gonzalo Lama	(Peru) Sergio Galdós (Argentina) Leonardo Mayer	2–6, 6–7^{(7–9)}
Win	10–13	Nov 2016	Guayaquil, Ecuador	Challenger	Clay	(Brazil) Fabiano de Paula	(El Salvador) Marcelo Arévalo (Peru) Sergio Galdós	6–2, 6–4
Loss	10–14	Nov 2016	Bogotá, Colombia	Challenger	Clay	(Ecuador) Gonzalo Escobar	(El Salvador) Marcelo Arévalo (Peru) Sergio Galdós	4–6, 1–6
Loss	10–15	Sep 2017	Genova, Italy	Challenger	Clay	(Argentina) Guido Andreozzi	(Germany) Tim Pütz (Germany) Jan-Lennard Struff	6–7^{(5–7)}, 6–7^{(8–10)}
Win	11–15	Oct 2017	Buenos Aires, Argentina	Challenger	Clay	(Brazil) Fabiano de Paula	(Argentina) Máximo González (Brazil) Fabrício Neis	7–6^{(7–3)}, 5–7, [10–8]
Loss	11–16	Nov 2017	Montevideo, Uruguay	Challenger	Clay	(Brazil) Fabiano de Paula	(Monaco) Romain Arneodo (Brazil) Fernando Romboli	6–2, 4–6, [8–10]
Win	12–16	Mar 2018	Punta del Este, Uruguay	Challenger	Clay	(Argentina) Facundo Bagnis	(Italy) Simone Bolelli (Italy) Alessandro Giannessi	6–2, 7–6^{(9–7)}
Win	13–16	Mar 2018	Marbella, Spain	Challenger	Clay	(Argentina) Guido Andreozzi	(Slovakia) Martin Kližan (Slovakia) Jozef Kovalík	6–3, 6–4
Loss	13–17	Apr 2018	Alicante, Spain	Challenger	Clay	(Argentina) Guido Andreozzi	(Netherlands) Wesley Koolhof (New Zealand) Artem Sitak	3–6, 2–6
Loss	13–18	Apr 2018	Barletta, Italy	Challenger	Clay	(Argentina) Máximo González	(Ukraine) Denys Molchanov (Slovakia) Igor Zelenay	1–6, 2–6
Loss	13–19	Apr 2018	Francavilla, Italy	Challenger	Clay	(Argentina) Máximo González	(Italy) Julian Ocleppo (Italy) Andrea Vavassori	6–7^{(5–7)}, 6–7^{(3–7)}
Loss	13–20	May 2018	Braga, Portugal	Challenger	Clay	(Mexico) Miguel Ángel Reyes-Varela	(Netherlands) Sander Arends (Canada) Adil Shamasdin	2–6, 1–6
Win	14–20	Jun 2018	Vicenza, Italy	Challenger	Clay	(Spain) Enrique López Pérez	(Argentina) Facundo Bagnis (Brazil) Fabrício Neis	6–2, 6–4
Win	15–20	Sep 2018	Mallorca, Spain	Challenger	Hard	(Spain) Enrique López Pérez	(United Kingdom) Dan Evans (Spain) Gerard Granollers Pujol	w/o
Loss	15–21	Oct 2018	Santo Domingo, Dominican Republic	Challenger	Clay	(Ecuador) Roberto Quiroz	(India) Leander Paes (Mexico) Miguel Ángel Reyes-Varela	6–4, 3–6, [5–10]
Loss	15–22	Oct 2018	Lima, Peru	Challenger	Clay	(Ecuador) Gonzalo Escobar	(Argentina) Guido Andreozzi (Argentina) Guillermo Durán	6–2, 6–7^{(5–7)}, [5–10]
Loss	15–23	Jan 2019	Playford, Australia	Challenger	Hard	(Spain) Enrique López Pérez	(Australia) Max Purcell (Australia) Luke Saville	4–6, 5–7
Loss	15–24	Apr 2019	San Luis Potosi, Mexico	Challenger	Clay	(Ecuador) Roberto Quiroz	(El Salvador) Marcelo Arevalo (Mexico) Miguel Ángel Reyes-Varela	6–1, 4–6, [10–12]
Win	16–24	May 2019	Jerusalem, Israel	Challenger	Hard	(Ecuador) Gonzalo Escobar	(United States) Evan King (Italy) Julian Ocleppo	6–4, 7–6^{(7–5)}
Loss	16–25	Jun 2019	Parma, Italy	Challenger	Clay	(Ecuador) Gonzalo Escobar	(Lithuania) Laurynas Grigelis (Italy) Andrea Pellegrino	6–1, 3–6, [7–10]
Win	17–25	Jul 2019	Prague, Czech Republic	Challenger	Clay	(Ecuador) Gonzalo Escobar	(Kazakhstan) Andrey Golubev (Kazakhstan) Aleksandr Nedovyesov	6–7^{(4–7)}, 7–5, [10–8]
Win	18–25	Sep 2019	Genoa, Italy	Challenger	Clay	(Ecuador) Gonzalo Escobar	(Argentina) Guido Andreozzi (Argentina) Andrés Molteni	3–6, 6–4, [10–3]
Loss	18–26	Sep 2019	Biella, Italy	Challenger	Clay	(Kazakhstan) Andrey Golubev	(Bosnia and Herzegovina) Tomislav Brkić (Croatia) Ante Pavić	6–7^{(2–7)}, 4–6
Win	19–26	Oct 2019	Santo Domingo, Dominican Republic	Challenger	Clay	(Ecuador) Gonzalo Escobar	(Brazil) Orlando Luz (Venezuela) Luis David Martínez	6–7^{(5–7)}, 6–4, [12–10]
Win	20–26	Oct 2019	Lima, Peru	Challenger	Clay	(Ecuador) Gonzalo Escobar	(Brazil) Felipe Meligeni Alves (Venezuela) Luis David Martínez	6–2, 2–6, [10–3]
Win	21–26	Nov 2019	Guayaquil, Ecuador	Challenger	Clay	(Ecuador) Gonzalo Escobar	(Brazil) Thiago Seyboth Wild (Brazil) Pedro Sakamoto	7–6^{(7–4)}, 7–6^{(7–5)}
Loss	21–27	Nov 2019	Houston, USA	Challenger	Hard	(Ecuador) Gonzalo Escobar	(Israel) Jonathan Erlich (Mexico) Santiago González	3–6, 6–7^{(4–7)}
Win	22–27	Jan 2020	Newport Beach, USA	Challenger	Hard	(Ecuador) Gonzalo Escobar	(Croatia) Antonio Šančić (Austria) Tristan-Samuel Weissborn	6–2, 6–4
Win	23–27	Aug 2020	Todi, Italy	Challenger	Clay	(Kazakhstan) Andrey Golubev	(France) Elliot Benchetrit (France) Hugo Gaston	6–4, 6–2
Win	24–27	Aug 2020	Trieste, Italy	Challenger	Clay	(Kazakhstan) Andrey Golubev	(France) Tristan Lamasine (France) Hugo Gaston	6–4, 6–2
Win	25–27	Sep 2020	Cordenons, Italy	Challenger	Clay	(Kazakhstan) Andrey Golubev	(Monaco) Hugo Nys (Argentina) Andrés Molteni	7–5, 6–4
Loss	25–28	Sep 2020	Aix-en-Provence, France	Challenger	Clay	(Ecuador) Gonzalo Escobar	(Argentina) Andrés Molteni (Monaco) Hugo Nys	4–6, 6–7^{(4–7)}
Loss	25–29	Oct 2020	Parma, Italy	Challenger	Clay	(Ecuador) Gonzalo Escobar	(El Salvador) Marcelo Arévalo (Bosnia and Herzegovina) Tomislav Brkić	4–6, 4–6
Win	26–29	Oct 2020	Istanbul, Turkey	Challenger	Hard	(Ecuador) Gonzalo Escobar	(United States) Robert Galloway (United States) Nathaniel Lammons	4–6, 6–3, [10–7]
Win	27–29	May 2023	Francavilla al Mare, Italy	Challenger	Clay	(Colombia) Nicolás Barrientos	(Netherlands) Sander Arends (Greece) Petros Tsitsipas	7–6^{(7–1)}, 3–6, [10–6]
Win	28–29	Jun 2023	Prostějov, Czech Republic	Challenger	Clay	(Czech Republic) Adam Pavlásek	(Italy) Marco Bortolotti (Spain) Sergio Martos Gornés	7–5, 6–4
Win	29–29	Jun 2023	Bratislava, Slovakia	Challenger	Clay	(Czech Republic) Adam Pavlásek	(Austria) Neil Oberleitner (Germany) Tim Sandkaulen	6–4, 6–4
Loss	29–30	Jun 2023	Poznań, Poland	Challenger	Clay	(Czech Republic) Adam Pavlásek	(Poland) Karol Drzewiecki (Czech Republic) Petr Nouza	6–7^{(2–7)}, 6–7^{(2–7)}
Loss	29–31	Aug 2024	Lincoln, United States	Challenger	Hard	(United Kingdom) Luke Johnson	(United States) Robert Cash (United States) JJ Tracy	6–7^{(6–8)}, 3–6
Win	30–31	Apr 2025	Estoril, Portugal	Challenger	Clay	(Belgium) Joran Vliegen	(Portugal) Francisco Cabral (Austria) Lucas Miedler	7–5, 6–3
Win	31–31	May 2025	Turin, Italy	Challenger	Clay	(Belgium) Joran Vliegen	(Netherlands) Robin Haase (Germany) Hendrik Jebens	6–2, 6–4
Loss	31–32	Mar 2026	Alicante, Spain	Challenger	Clay	(Colombia) Nicolás Barrientos	(Poland) Szymon Kielan (Portugal) Tiago Pereira	6–4, 3–6, [13–15]
Loss	31–33	Apr 2026	Oeiras, Portugal	Challenger	Clay	(Colombia) Nicolás Barrientos	(India) Sriram Balaji (Austria) Neil Oberleitner	7–6^{(9–7)}, 4–6, [9–11]
Win	32–33	Apr 2026	Rome, Italy	Challenger	Clay	(Colombia) Nicolás Barrientos	(Czech Republic) Miloš Karol (Czech Republic) Andrew Paulson	7–6^{(7–4)}, 4–6, [10–7]

== Best Grand Slam results details ==
=== Doubles ===
	Australian Open	
2022 Australian Open (15th Seed)
with (Ecuador) Gonzalo Escobar
Round	Opponents	Score
1R	(Bosnia and Herzegovina) Tomislav Brkić / (Serbia) Nikola Ćaćić	6–4, 7–5
2R	(Germany) Dominik Koepfer / (Germany) Jan-Lennard Struff	7–6^{(7–5)}, 4–6, 6–2
3R	(Australia) Thanasi Kokkinakis / (Australia) Nick Kyrgios (WC)	4–6, 6–4, 4–6

	French Open	
2022 French Open
with (Ecuador) Gonzalo Escobar
Round	Opponents	Score
1R	(Argentina) Francisco Cerúndolo / (Argentina) Federico Coria	6–2, 6–4
2R	(United Kingdom) Lloyd Glasspool / (Finland) Harri Heliövaara	4–6, 2–6

	Wimbledon Championships	
2021 Wimbledon^{[a]}
with (Ecuador) Gonzalo Escobar
Round	Opponents	Score
1R	(Monaco) Hugo Nys / (United Kingdom) Jonny O'Mara	6–4, 7–6^{(7–3)}
2R	(Australia) Matthew Ebden / (Australia) John-Patrick Smith	7–6^{(7–5)}, 6–7^{(4–7)}, 6–4
3R	(United States) Rajeev Ram / (United Kingdom) Joe Salisbury (6)	3–6, 3–6, 6–7^{(10–12)}

	US Open	
2022 US Open
with (Ecuador) Gonzalo Escobar
Round	Opponents	Score
1R	(Spain) Albert Ramos Viñolas / (Spain) Bernabé Zapata Miralles	6–4, 6–0
2R	(Croatia) Ivan Dodig / (United States) Austin Krajicek (7)	1–6, 7–6^{(7–5)}, 7–6^{(10–5)}
3R	(Monaco) Hugo Nys / (Poland) Jan Zieliński	1–6, 4–6

^{a} Because of a delay in schedule due to rain, the first two rounds of the competition were played best-of-three sets instead of the usual best-of-five format.

== Wins over top 10 players ==
=== Doubles ===
- Behar has a 6–12 record against players who were, at the time the match was played, ranked in the top 10.

Type	2020	2021	2022	2024	Total
Wins	0	2	3	1	6

#	Opponents	Rank	Event	Surface	Rd	Score	Partner	ABR
2021
1.	(Brazil) Marcelo Melo (Romania) Horia Tecău	9; 22	Melbourne, Australia	Hard	QF	7–6^{(7–4)}, 6–3	(Ecuador) Gonzalo Escobar	60
2.	(Croatia) Marin Čilić (Croatia) Ivan Dodig	274; 9	Stuttgart, Germany	Grass	SF	7–6^{(7–5)}, 1–6, [14–10]	(Ecuador) Gonzalo Escobar	51
2022
3.	(Croatia) Nikola Mektić (Croatia) Mate Pavić	7; 4	Belgrade, Serbia	Clay	F	6–2, 3–6, [10–7]	(Ecuador) Gonzalo Escobar	49
4.	(United Kingdom) Jamie Murray (New Zealand) Michael Venus	18; 9	Rome, Italy	Clay	1R	6–7^{(2–7)}, 6–3, [10–5]	(Ecuador) Gonzalo Escobar	49
5.	(United Kingdom) Joe Salisbury (United States) Rajeev Ram	1; 2	Montreal, Canada	Hard	2R	6–4, 7–6^{(7–3)}	(Ecuador) Gonzalo Escobar	46
2024
6.	(United Kingdom) Neal Skupski (Mexico) Santiago González	10; 11	AO, Melbourne, Australia	Hard	3R	3-6, 7-6 ^{(7–1)}, 6-4	(Czech Republic) Adam Pavlásek	48
