= 2021 Andalucía Open – Doubles =

Doubles
- 2021 Andalucía Open

Final
- Champion: (Uruguay) Ariel Behar (Ecuador) Gonzalo Escobar
- Runner-up: (Bosnia and Herzegovina) Tomislav Brkić (Serbia) Nikola Ćaćić
- Score: 6–2, 6–4

Events
Singles	Doubles
- Andalucía Open

This was the first edition of the tournament, primarily organised due to the cancellation of some tournaments in 2021, due to the COVID-19 pandemic.

Ariel Behar and Gonzalo Escobar won the title, defeating Tomislav Brkić and Nikola Ćaćić in the final, 6–2, 6–4.

== Seeds ==
1. (Belgium) Sander Gillé / (Belgium) Joran Vliegen (first round)
2. (New Zealand) Marcus Daniell / (Austria) Philipp Oswald (quarterfinals)
3. (El Salvador) Marcelo Arévalo / (Netherlands) Matwé Middelkoop (semifinals)
4. (Australia) Luke Saville / (Australia) John-Patrick Smith (first round)

== Draw ==
Key

- Q = Qualifier
- WC = Wild card
- LL = Lucky loser
- Alt = Alternate
- ITF = ITF entry
- PR = Protected ranking
- SR = Special ranking
- SE = Special exempt
- JE = Junior exempt
- JR = Junior Accelerator Programme entrant
- CO = College Accelerator Programme entrant
- NG = Next Gen Accelerator Program entrant
- w/o = Walkover
- r = Retired
- d = Defaulted

=== Draw ===
First round
1	(Belgium) S Gillé (Belgium) J Vliegen	6	6^{5}	[8]
WC	(Spain) D Marrero (Spain) A Menéndez Maceiras	4	7^{7}	[10]
(Monaco) H Nys (Germany) T Pütz	4	6	[10]
(Spain) R Carballés Baena (Spain) A Ramos Viñolas	6	3	[7]
4	(Australia) L Saville (Australia) J-P Smith	1	7	[10]
(Uruguay) A Behar (Ecuador) G Escobar	6	5	[12]
(Sweden) A Göransson (United States) N Monroe	6	1	[12]
(Kazakhstan) A Bublik (United Kingdom) D Inglot	3	6	[10]
(Lithuania) R Berankis (New Zealand) A Sitak	6	4	[11]
(Mexico) S González (Mexico) MÁ Reyes-Varela	4	6	[13]
(Israel) J Erlich (Belarus) A Vasilevski	4	6^{2}
3	(El Salvador) M Arévalo (Netherlands) M Middelkoop	6	7^{7}
(Bosnia and Herzegovina) T Brkić (Serbia) N Ćaćić	1	6	[10]
(Netherlands) S Arends (Netherlands) D Pel	6	0	[5]
WC	(Spain) F López (Spain) M López	1	2
2	(New Zealand) M Daniell (Austria) P Oswald	6	6

Quarterfinals
WC	(Spain) D Marrero (Spain) A Menéndez Maceiras	4	0
(Monaco) H Nys (Germany) T Pütz	6	6
(Uruguay) A Behar (Ecuador) G Escobar	6	7
(Sweden) A Göransson (United States) N Monroe	4	5
(Mexico) S González (Mexico) MÁ Reyes-Varela	3	2
3	(El Salvador) M Arévalo (Netherlands) M Middelkoop	6	6
(Bosnia and Herzegovina) T Brkić (Serbia) N Ćaćić	4	7^{7}	[11]
2	(New Zealand) M Daniell (Austria) P Oswald	6	6^{5}	[9]

Semifinals
(Monaco) H Nys (Germany) T Pütz	4	6^{1}
(Uruguay) A Behar (Ecuador) G Escobar	6	7^{7}
3	(El Salvador) M Arévalo (Netherlands) M Middelkoop	4	4
(Bosnia and Herzegovina) T Brkić (Serbia) N Ćaćić	6	6

Final
(Uruguay) A Behar (Ecuador) G Escobar	6	6
(Bosnia and Herzegovina) T Brkić (Serbia) N Ćaćić	2	4
