= 2019 Internazionali di Tennis Emilia Romagna – Singles =

Singles
- 2019 Internazionali di Tennis Emilia Romagna

Final
- Champion: (Spain) Tommy Robredo
- Runner-up: (Italy) Federico Gaio
- Score: 7–6^{(12–10)}, 5–7, 7–6^{(8–6)}

Events
Singles	Doubles
- Internazionali di Tennis Emilia Romagna

This was the first edition of the tournament.

Tommy Robredo won the title after defeating Federico Gaio 7–6^{(12–10)}, 5–7, 7–6^{(8–6)} in the final.

== Seeds ==
All seeds receive a bye into the second round.

1. (Bolivia) Hugo Dellien (second round)
2. (Italy) Paolo Lorenzi (second round)
3. (Japan) Taro Daniel (second round)
4. (Italy) Stefano Travaglia (quarterfinals)
5. (Italy) Alessandro Giannessi (second round)
6. (Italy) Federico Gaio (final)
7. (Italy) Andrea Arnaboldi (second round)
8. (Spain) Tommy Robredo (champion)
9. (Italy) Gianluigi Quinzi (third round)
10. (Australia) Maverick Banes (third round)
11. (Spain) Daniel Gimeno Traver (second round)
12. (Canada) Filip Peliwo (third round)
13. (France) Stéphane Robert (second round)
14. (Brazil) Guilherme Clezar (second round)
15. (Serbia) Danilo Petrović (second round)
16. (Lithuania) Laurynas Grigelis (second round)

== Draw ==
Key

- Q = Qualifier
- WC = Wild card
- LL = Lucky loser
- Alt = Alternate
- ITF = ITF entry
- PR = Protected ranking
- SR = Special ranking
- SE = Special exempt
- JE = Junior exempt
- JR = Junior Accelerator Programme entrant
- CO = College Accelerator Programme entrant
- NG = Next Gen Accelerator Program entrant
- w/o = Walkover
- r = Retired
- d = Defaulted

=== Finals ===
Quarterfinals
(Argentina) Andrea Collarini	4	6^{3}
8	(Spain) Tommy Robredo	6	7^{7}
(Italy) Jacopo Berrettini	1	3
(Germany) Julian Lenz	6	6
6	(Italy) Federico Gaio	6	3	6
4	(Italy) Stefano Travaglia	4	6	3
(Uruguay) Martín Cuevas	7^{7}	6^{2}	1
WC	(Italy) Giulio Zeppieri	6^{5}	7^{7}	6

Semifinals
8	(Spain) Tommy Robredo	5
(Germany) Julian Lenz	0^{r}
6	(Italy) Federico Gaio	6	3	7^{7}
WC	(Italy) Giulio Zeppieri	4	6	6^{3}

Final
8	(Spain) Tommy Robredo	7^{12}	5	7^{8}
6	(Italy) Federico Gaio	6^{10}	7	6^{6}

=== Top half ===
==== Section 1 ====
First round
WC	(Italy) A Virgili	6^{7}	6^{5}
(Italy) A Vavassori	7^{9}	7^{7}
(Argentina) A Collarini	6	6
(Spain) Carlos Boluda-Purkiss	3	0
(Italy) R Brancaccio	6	6
Alt	(Italy) Fabrizio Ornago	4	3
(Germany) J Härteis	2	1^{r}
ITF	(Switzerland) S Ehrat	6	2

Second round
1	(Bolivia) H Dellien	1	1
(Italy) A Vavassori	6	6
(Argentina) A Collarini	6	6
16	(Lithuania) L Grigelis	3	3
11	(Spain) D Gimeno Traver	6^{4}	3
(Italy) R Brancaccio	7^{7}	6
ITF	(Switzerland) S Ehrat	5	3
8	(Spain) T Robredo	7	6

Third round
(Italy) A Vavassori	2	5
(Argentina) A Collarini	6	7
(Italy) R Brancaccio	2	3
8	(Spain) T Robredo	6	6

Quarterfinals
(Argentina) A Collarini	4	6^{3}
8	(Spain) T Robredo	6	7^{7}

==== Section 2 ====
First round
ITF	(Belgium) Christopher Heyman	6^{3}	1
(Australia) Jacob Grills	7^{7}	6
(Italy) J Berrettini	6	7
WC	(Italy) L Musetti	4	5
WC	(Italy) Gianluca Di Nicola	7	6
(France) A Escoffier	5	2
ITF	(Italy) R Bonadio	6^{1}	2
(Germany) J Lenz	7^{7}	6

Second round
3	(Japan) T Daniel	6	3	4
(Australia) J Grills	4	6	6
(Italy) J Berrettini	6	7
15	(Serbia) D Petrović	4	5
12	(Canada) F Peliwo	6	6
WC	(Italy) G Di Nicola	3	3
(Germany) J Lenz	6	6
5	(Italy) A Giannessi	1	4

Third round
(Australia) J Grills	1	4
(Italy) J Berrettini	6	6
12	(Canada) F Peliwo	3	1
(Germany) J Lenz	6	6

Quarterfinals
(Italy) J Berrettini	1	3
(Germany) J Lenz	6	6

=== Bottom half ===
==== Section 3 ====
First round
(Italy) A Bega	6	6
(Ecuador) G Escobar	4	3
Q	(Italy) M Bortolotti	6	2	6
WC	(Italy) Emiliano Maggioli	1	6	2
(Italy) A Pellegrino	6	6
(Italy) J Ocleppo	4	0
(Bulgaria) D Kuzmanov	6	4	6
(Russia) A Avidzba	4	6	2

Second round
6	(Italy) F Gaio	6	6^{5}	6
(Italy) A Bega	4	7^{7}	4
Q	(Italy) M Bortolotti	1	3
9	(Italy) G Quinzi	6	6
14	(Brazil) G Clezar	7	6^{5}	4
(Italy) A Pellegrino	5	7^{7}	6
(Bulgaria) D Kuzmanov	5	4
4	(Italy) S Travaglia	7	6

Third round
6	(Italy) F Gaio	6	6
9	(Italy) G Quinzi	3	4
(Italy) A Pellegrino	6	2	0
4	(Italy) S Travaglia	3	6	6

Quarterfinals
6	(Italy) F Gaio	6	3	6
4	(Italy) S Travaglia	4	6	3

==== Section 4 ====
First round
(Czech Republic) J Šátral	3	6^{1}
(Uruguay) M Cuevas	6	7^{7}
(Italy) A Basso	6	5	6
Q	(Italy) F Forti	1	7	3
ITF	(Bosnia and Herzegovina) N Fatić	6	5
(Argentina) MF Descotte	3	2^{r}
(Italy) E Dalla Valle	4	0^{r}
WC	(Italy) G Zeppieri	6	0

Second round
7	(Italy) A Arnaboldi	7^{7}	6^{4}	4
(Uruguay) M Cuevas	6^{4}	7^{7}	6
(Italy) A Basso	1	6^{3}
10	(Australia) M Banes	6	7^{7}
13	(France) S Robert	2	3
ITF	(Bosnia and Herzegovina) N Fatić	6	6
WC	(Italy) G Zeppieri	6	1	6
2	(Italy) P Lorenzi	3	6	4

Third round
(Uruguay) M Cuevas	6	6
10	(Australia) M Banes	4	0
ITF	(Bosnia and Herzegovina) N Fatić	1	2
WC	(Italy) G Zeppieri	6	6

Quarterfinals
(Uruguay) M Cuevas	7^{7}	6^{2}	1
WC	(Italy) G Zeppieri	6^{5}	7^{7}	6
