= 2019 Internazionali di Tennis Emilia Romagna =

- Date: 17–23 June
- Edition: 1st
- Draw: 48S / 4Q / 16D
- Surface: Clay
- Location: Parma, Italy

Champions

Singles
- (Spain) Tommy Robredo

Doubles
- (Lithuania) Laurynas Grigelis / (Italy) Andrea Pellegrino
- Internazionali di Tennis Emilia Romagna

The 2019 Internazionali di Tennis Emilia Romagna was a professional tennis tournament played on clay courts. It was the first edition of the tournament which was part of the 2019 ATP Challenger Tour. It took place in Parma, Italy between 17 and 23 June 2019.

== Singles main-draw entrants ==
=== Seeds ===
Country	Player	Rank^{1}	Seed
BOL	Hugo Dellien	95	1
ITA	Paolo Lorenzi	97	2
JPN	Taro Daniel	110	3
ITA	Stefano Travaglia	112	4
ITA	Alessandro Giannessi	152	5
ITA	Federico Gaio	210	6
ITA	Andrea Arnaboldi	213	7
ESP	Tommy Robredo	216	8
ITA	Gianluigi Quinzi	252	9
AUS	Maverick Banes	257	10
ESP	Daniel Gimeno Traver	261	11
CAN	Filip Peliwo	266	12
FRA	Stéphane Robert	281	13
BRA	Guilherme Clezar	283	14
SRB	Danilo Petrović	291	15
LTU	Laurynas Grigelis	298	16

- ^{1} Rankings are as of 10 June 2019.

=== Other entrants ===
The following players received wildcards into the singles main draw:

- (Italy) Gianluca Di Nicola
- (Italy) Emiliano Maggioli
- (Italy) Lorenzo Musetti
- (Italy) Adelchi Virgili
- (Italy) Giulio Zeppieri

The following player received entry into the singles main draw as an alternate:

- (Italy) Fabrizio Ornago

The following players received entry into the singles main draw using their ITF World Tennis Ranking:

- (Italy) Riccardo Bonadio
- (Switzerland) Sandro Ehrat
- (Argentina) ~~Tomás Martín Etcheverry~~
- (Bosnia and Herzegovina) Nerman Fatić
- (Belgium) Christopher Heyman

The following players received entry from the qualifying draw:

- (Italy) Marco Bortolotti
- (Italy) Francesco Forti

== Champions ==
=== Singles ===
- (Spain) Tommy Robredo def. (Italy) Federico Gaio 7–6^{(12–10)}, 5–7, 7–6^{(8–6)}.

=== Doubles ===
- (Lithuania) Laurynas Grigelis / (Italy) Andrea Pellegrino def. (Uruguay) Ariel Behar / (Ecuador) Gonzalo Escobar 1–6, 6–3, [10–7].
