= 2026 Open de Oeiras – Doubles =

Doubles
- 2026 Open de Oeiras

Final
- Champions: (India) Sriram Balaji (Austria) Neil Oberleitner
- Runners-up: (Colombia) Nicolás Barrientos (Uruguay) Ariel Behar
- Score: 6–7^{(7–9)}, 6–4, [11–9]

Events
Singles	Doubles
- Open de Oeiras

Andreas Mies and David Vega Hernández were the defending champions but chose not to defend their title.

Sriram Balaji and Neil Oberleitner won the title after defeating Nicolás Barrientos and Ariel Behar 6–7^{(7–9)}, 6–4, [11–9] in the final.

== Seeds ==
1. (Belgium) Sander Gillé / (Netherlands) Sem Verbeek (first round)
2. (Chinese Taipei) Ray Ho / (Germany) Hendrik Jebens (first round)
3. (India) Sriram Balaji / (Austria) Neil Oberleitner (champions)
4. (Switzerland) Jakub Paul / (Czech Republic) Matěj Vocel (first round)

== Draw ==
Key

- Q = Qualifier
- WC = Wild card
- LL = Lucky loser
- Alt = Alternate
- ITF = ITF entry
- PR = Protected ranking
- SR = Special ranking
- SE = Special exempt
- JE = Junior exempt
- JR = Junior Accelerator Programme entrant
- CO = College Accelerator Programme entrant
- NG = Next Gen Accelerator Program entrant
- w/o = Walkover
- r = Retired
- d = Defaulted

First round
1	(Belgium) S Gillé (Netherlands) S Verbeek	4	6^{3}
(Czech Republic) F Duda (Czech Republic) M Vrbenský	6	7^{7}
(United States) T Hilderbrand (Portugal) T Pereira	6	2	[6]
(Colombia) N Barrientos (Uruguay) A Behar	3	6	[10]
4	(Switzerland) J Paul (Czech Republic) M Vocel	6	2	[9]
I Liutarevich (Poland) F Pieczonka	4	6	[11]
(Poland) K Drzewiecki (Poland) P Matuszewski	5	4
WC	(Portugal) G Elias (Portugal) F Ferreira Silva	7	6
(United States) B Kittay (United Kingdom) M Willis	7	6
(Australia) B Bayldon (Netherlands) M Veldheer	5	4
(India) S Banthia (Bulgaria) A Donski	1	6	[8]
3	(India) S Balaji (Austria) N Oberleitner	6	1	[10]
(France) A Reymond (France) L Sanchez	6	6
WC	(Portugal) Francisco Rocha (Portugal) T Torres	4	3
(Ecuador) G Escobar (Croatia) N Serdarušić	7	6
2	(Chinese Taipei) R Ho (Germany) H Jebens	5	4

Quarterfinals
(Czech Republic) F Duda (Czech Republic) M Vrbenský	6^{3}	5
(Colombia) N Barrientos (Uruguay) A Behar	7^{7}	7
I Liutarevich (Poland) F Pieczonka	6	6
WC	(Portugal) G Elias (Portugal) F Ferreira Silva	4	2
(United States) B Kittay (United Kingdom) M Willis	3	4
3	(India) S Balaji (Austria) N Oberleitner	6	6
(France) A Reymond (France) L Sanchez	3	6	[12]
(Ecuador) G Escobar (Croatia) N Serdarušić	6	2	[10]

Semifinals
(Colombia) N Barrientos (Uruguay) A Behar	7^{9}	4	[10]
I Liutarevich (Poland) F Pieczonka	6^{7}	6	[8]
3	(India) S Balaji (Austria) N Oberleitner	7^{7}	3	[11]
(France) A Reymond (France) L Sanchez	6^{2}	6	[9]

Final
(Colombia) N Barrientos (Uruguay) A Behar	7^{9}	4	[9]
3	(India) S Balaji (Austria) N Oberleitner	6^{7}	6	[11]
