= 2021 Andalucía Open – Singles =

Singles
- 2021 Andalucía Open

Final
- Champion: (Spain) Pablo Carreño Busta
- Runner-up: (Spain) Jaume Munar
- Score: 6–1, 2–6, 6–4

Details
- Draw: 28
- Seeds: 8

Events
Singles	Doubles
- Andalucía Open

Pablo Carreño Busta defeated Jaume Munar in the final, 6–1, 2–6, 6–4 to win the inaugural Men's Singles tennis title at the 2021 Andalucía Open.

This was the first edition of the tournament, primarily organised due to the cancellation of some tournaments in 2021, due to the COVID-19 pandemic.

== Seeds ==
The top four seeds received a bye into the second round.

1. (Spain) Pablo Carreño Busta (champion)
2. (Italy) Fabio Fognini (second round)
3. (Norway) Casper Ruud (quarterfinals)
4. (Spain) Albert Ramos Viñolas (semifinals)
5. (Spain) Alejandro Davidovich Fokina (second round)
6. (Spain) Feliciano López (second round)
7. (South Korea) Kwon Soon-woo (quarterfinals)
8. (Argentina) Federico Delbonis (second round)

== Draw ==
Key

- Q = Qualifier
- WC = Wild card
- LL = Lucky loser
- Alt = Alternate
- ITF = ITF entry
- PR = Protected ranking
- SR = Special ranking
- SE = Special exempt
- JE = Junior exempt
- JR = Junior Accelerator Programme entrant
- CO = College Accelerator Programme entrant
- NG = Next Gen Accelerator Program entrant
- w/o = Walkover
- r = Retired
- d = Defaulted

=== Finals ===
Semifinals
1	(Spain) Pablo Carreño Busta	6	3	7^{7}
4	(Spain) Albert Ramos Viñolas	1	6	6^{5}
WC	(Spain) Carlos Alcaraz	6^{4}	4
(Spain) Jaume Munar	7^{7}	6

Final
1	(Spain) Pablo Carreño Busta	6	2	6
(Spain) Jaume Munar	1	6	4

=== Top half ===
First round
Q	(Spain) B Zapata Miralles	2	3
Q	(Spain) M Vilella Martínez	6	6
(Argentina) F Bagnis	6	7^{7}
(Argentina) F Cerúndolo	3	6^{2}
WC	(Denmark) H Rune	3	6	6^{4}
7	(South Korea) S-w Kwon	6	3	7^{7}
(France) L Pouille	4	7^{7}	5
(Lithuania) R Berankis	6	6^{5}	7
(Slovakia) N Gombos	6^{3}	6	6
(Argentina) JI Londero	7^{7}	1	3
(Spain) R Carballés Baena	5	1
8	(Argentina) F Delbonis	7	6

Second round
1	(Spain) P Carreño Busta	7^{7}	6
Q	(Spain) M Vilella Martínez	6^{2}	3
(Argentina) F Bagnis	1	3
7	(South Korea) S-w Kwon	6	6
4	(Spain) A Ramos Viñolas	6	4	6
(Lithuania) R Berankis	3	6	3
(Slovakia) N Gombos	5	7^{7}	7^{7}
8	(Argentina) F Delbonis	7	6^{4}	6^{1}

Quarterfinals
1	(Spain) P Carreño Busta	6	6
7	(South Korea) S-w Kwon	4	0
4	(Spain) A Ramos Viñolas	6^{4}	7	6
(Slovakia) N Gombos	7^{7}	5	4

Semifinals
1	(Spain) P Carreño Busta	6	3	7^{7}
4	(Spain) A Ramos Viñolas	1	6	6^{5}

=== Bottom half ===
First round
6	(Spain) F López	6	6
(Japan) T Daniel	4	4
Q	(Serbia) N Milojević	6^{3}	3
WC	(Spain) C Alcaraz	7^{7}	6
(Kazakhstan) M Kukushkin	5	3
(Italy) G Mager	7	6
5	(Spain) A Davidovich Fokina	6^{1}	6	6
(Bosnia and Herzegovina) D Džumhur	7^{7}	2	2
(Belarus) I Ivashka	6	7^{7}
(Spain) P Martínez	3	6^{2}
Q	(Switzerland) H Laaksonen	4	1
(Spain) J Munar	6	6

Second round
6	(Spain) F López	6	2	4
WC	(Spain) C Alcaraz	4	6	6
(Italy) G Mager	3	2
3	(Norway) C Ruud	6	6
5	(Spain) A Davidovich Fokina	1	3
(Belarus) I Ivashka	6	6
(Spain) J Munar	6	6
2/WC	(Italy) F Fognini	2	1

Quarterfinals
WC	(Spain) C Alcaraz	6	6
3	(Norway) C Ruud	2	4
(Belarus) I Ivashka	7^{7}	4	4
(Spain) J Munar	6^{5}	6	6

Semifinals
WC	(Spain) C Alcaraz	6^{4}	4
(Spain) J Munar	7^{7}	6

== Qualifying ==
=== Seeds ===
1. (Russia) Evgeny Donskoy (qualifying competition)
2. (Germany) Peter Gojowczyk (first round)
3. (France) Antoine Hoang (first round)
4. (Switzerland) Henri Laaksonen (qualified)
5. (Spain) Bernabé Zapata Miralles (qualified)
6. (Serbia) Nikola Milojević (qualified)
7. (Slovakia) Martin Kližan (first round)
8. (Italy) Lorenzo Giustino (qualifying competition)

=== Qualifiers ===
1. (Spain) Bernabé Zapata Miralles
2. (Serbia) Nikola Milojević
3. (Spain) Mario Vilella Martínez
4. (Switzerland) Henri Laaksonen

=== Qualifying draw ===
==== First qualifier ====
First round
1	(Russia) Evgeny Donskoy	6	6
WC	(Sweden) Leo Borg	1	0
(Latvia) Ernests Gulbis	2	1
5	(Spain) Bernabé Zapata Miralles	6	6

Qualifying competition
1	(Russia) Evgeny Donskoy	1	4
5	(Spain) Bernabé Zapata Miralles	6	6

==== Second qualifier ====
First round
2	(Germany) Peter Gojowczyk	2	3
(Canada) Steven Diez	6	6
(Italy) Alessandro Giannessi	7^{7}	3	1^{r}
6	(Serbia) Nikola Milojević	6^{4}	6	4

Qualifying competition
(Canada) Steven Diez	5	3
6	(Serbia) Nikola Milojević	7	6

==== Third qualifier ====
First round
3	(France) Antoine Hoang	2	4
Alt	(Spain) Mario Vilella Martínez	6	6
WC	(Spain) Carlos Gómez-Herrera	6	6
7	(Slovakia) Martin Kližan	4	1

Qualifying competition
Alt	(Spain) Mario Vilella Martínez	6	3	6
WC	(Spain) Carlos Gómez-Herrera	3	6	3

==== Fourth qualifier ====
First round
4	(Switzerland) Henri Laaksonen	6	6^{7}	6
(Russia) Roman Safiullin	3	7^{9}	1
Alt	(Italy) Roberto Marcora	6^{4}	4
8	(Italy) Lorenzo Giustino	7^{7}	6

Qualifying competition
4	(Switzerland) Henri Laaksonen	7	3	6
8	(Italy) Lorenzo Giustino	5	6	1
