= 2009 Andalucia Tennis Experience – Singles =

Singles
- 2009 Andalucia Tennis Experience

Final
- Champion: (Serbia) Jelena Janković
- Runner-up: (Spain) Carla Suárez Navarro
- Score: 6–3, 3–6, 6–3

Details
- Draw: 32
- Seeds: 8

Events
Singles	Doubles
- Andalucia Tennis Experience

Second-seeded Jelena Janković won in the final 6–3, 3–6, 6–3 over Carla Suárez Navarro.

== Seeds ==
1. (United States) Serena Williams (first round)
2. (Serbia) Jelena Janković (champion)
3. (Estonia) Kaia Kanepi (quarterfinals)
4. (Spain) Anabel Medina Garrigues (semifinals)
5. (Spain) Carla Suárez Navarro (final)
6. (Italy) Sara Errani (quarterfinals)
7. (Romania) Sorana Cîrstea (semifinals)
8. (Bulgaria) Tsvetana Pironkova (first round)

== Draw ==
Key

- Q = Qualifier
- WC = Wild card
- LL = Lucky loser
- Alt = Alternate
- ITF = ITF entry
- PR = Protected ranking
- SR = Special ranking
- SE = Special exempt
- JE = Junior exempt
- JR = Junior Accelerator Programme entrant
- CO = College Accelerator Programme entrant
- NG = Next Gen Accelerator Program entrant
- w/o = Walkover
- r = Retired
- d = Defaulted

=== Finals ===
Semifinals
5	(Spain) Carla Suárez Navarro	6	6^{5}	6
7	(Romania) Sorana Cîrstea	2	7	2
4	(Spain) Anabel Medina Garrigues	5	2
2	(Serbia) Jelena Janković	7	6

Final
5	(Spain) Carla Suárez Navarro	3	6	3
2	(Serbia) Jelena Janković	6	3	6

=== Top half ===
First round
1	(United States) S Williams	4	6	1
(Czech Republic) K Zakopalová	6	3	6
(Czech Republic) R Voráčová	7	4	6
(France) P Parmentier	6^{8}	6	4
Q	(Russia) E Ivanova	6	6
Q	(Slovenia) M Zec Peškirič	0	4
(Estonia) M Ani	5	5
5	(Spain) C Suárez Navarro	7	7
3/WC	(Estonia) K Kanepi	6	6
LL	(Spain) S Soler Espinosa	4	2
WC	(Spain) MT Torró Flor	6	2	0
Q	(Netherlands) A Rus	4	6	6
(Slovenia) A Klepač	5	6	6
(France) S Brémond	7	2	2
(Romania) IR Olaru	4	2
7	(Romania) S Cîrstea	6	6

Second round
(Czech Republic) K Zakopalová	7	5	6
(Czech Republic) R Voráčová	6^{7}	7	0
Q	(Russia) E Ivanova	6	3	0
5	(Spain) C Suárez Navarro	0	6	6
3/WC	(Estonia) K Kanepi	7	6
Q	(Netherlands) A Rus	5	2
(Slovenia) A Klepač	6	1	1
7	(Romania) S Cîrstea	4	6	6

Quarterfinals
(Czech Republic) K Zakopalová	1	2
5	(Spain) C Suárez Navarro	6	6
3/WC	(Estonia) K Kanepi	4	6	5
7	(Romania) S Cîrstea	6	2	7

Semifinals
5	(Spain) C Suárez Navarro	6	6^{5}	6
7	(Romania) S Cîrstea	2	7	2

=== Bottom half ===
First round
6	(Italy) S Errani	7	7
(Germany) J Schruff	5	6^{6}
(France) S Cohen-Aloro	6	6^{4}	2
Q	(Slovenia) P Hercog	3	7	6
(Spain) V Ruano Pascual	6	2	6
(Italy) T Garbin	1	6	1
(Belarus) A Yakimova	1	3
4	(Spain) A Medina Garrigues	6	6
8	(Bulgaria) T Pironkova	7	2	4
(Italy) R Vinci	6^{4}	6	6
(Germany) A Kerber	6	4	4
(Czech Republic) N Vaidišová	3	6	6
LL	(Tunisia) S Sfar	6	7
WC	(Spain) E Cabeza Candela	3	6^{4}
(Italy) F Schiavone	2	1
2	(Serbia) J Janković	6	6

Second round
6	(Italy) S Errani	6	7
Q	(Slovenia) P Hercog	0	6^{7}
(Spain) V Ruano Pascual	2	3
4	(Spain) A Medina Garrigues	6	6
(Italy) R Vinci	6	6
(Czech Republic) N Vaidišová	3	3
LL	(Tunisia) S Sfar	3	0
2	(Serbia) J Janković	6	6

Quarterfinals
6	(Italy) S Errani	2	7	5
4	(Spain) A Medina Garrigues	6	6^{4}	7
(Italy) R Vinci	6	3	6^{6}
2	(Serbia) J Janković	3	6	7

Semifinals
4	(Spain) A Medina Garrigues	5	2
2	(Serbia) J Janković	7	6
