= Club de Tenis Puente Romano =

Tennis club in Marbella, Spain

- Formation: 1979; 47 years ago
- Purpose: Sport
- Location: Marbella, Spain
- Coordinates: 36°30′7″N 4°55′33″W
- Website: tenis.puenteromano.com

The Club de Tenis Puente Romano is a tennis club in Marbella, Spain. The facility was opened in 1979 as part of a hotel, Hotel Puente Romano, and was initially managed by Björn Borg.

== History ==
The tennis club is within the grounds of Hotel Puente Romano, which was first built as an apartment complex in 1974, and converted to a hotel in 1979.

The club was the host of the Andalucia Tennis Experience, between 2009 and 2011. It has also been the venue for Davis Cup matches in 1989 and 2018. It hosted the Marbella Tennis Open in 2018 and 2019.
