= Beatriz García Vidagany =

Spanish tennis player (born 1988)

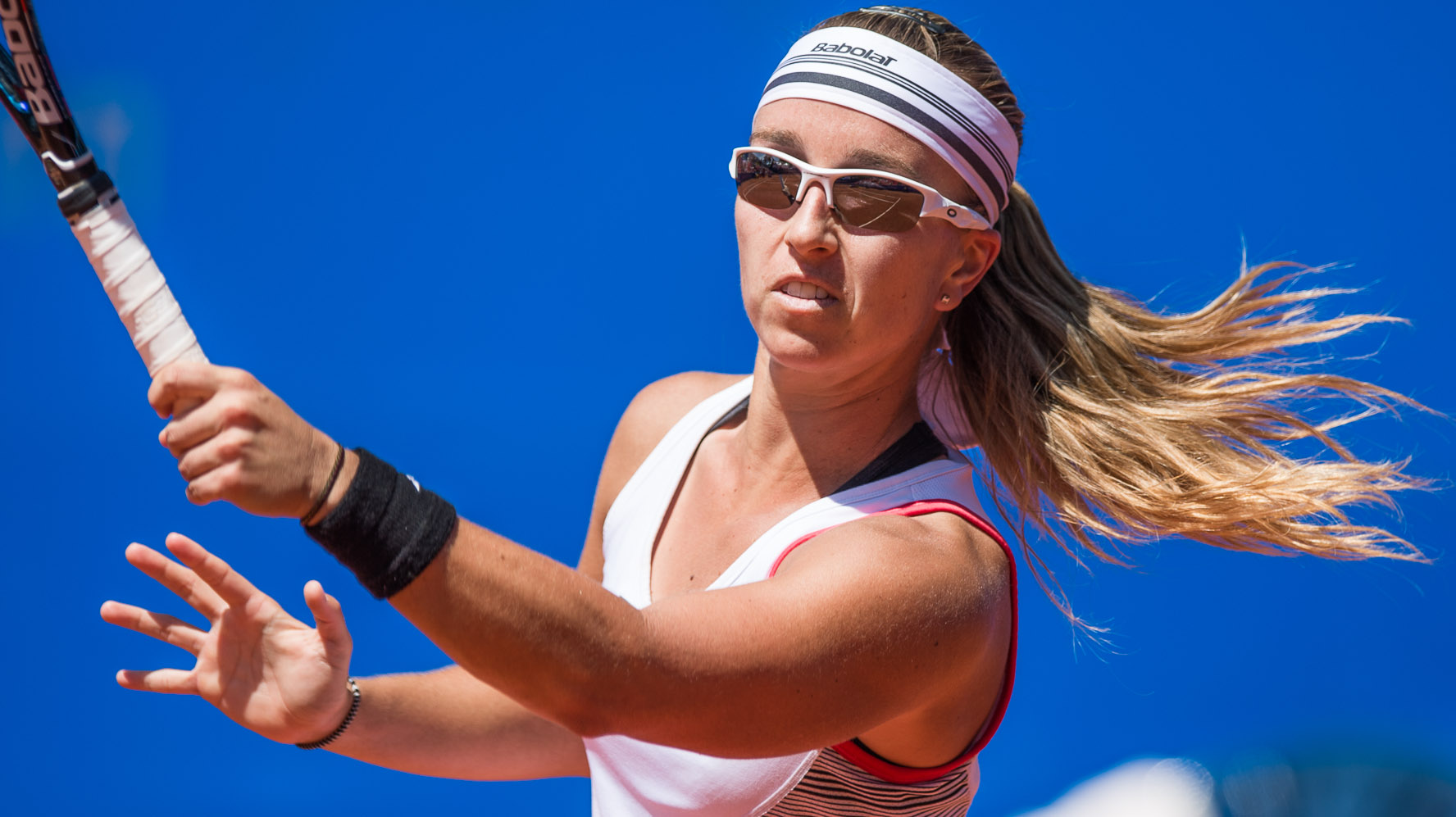
- Beatriz at the 2014 Nürnberger Versicherungscup
- Country (sports): Spain
- Residence: Valencia, Spain
- Born: 17 November 1988 (age 36) Valencia
- Height: 1.63 m (5 ft 4 in)
- Turned pro: 2005
- Retired: December 2015
- Plays: Left (two-handed backhand)
- Prize money: $204,950

Singles
- Career record: 251–184
- Career titles: 2 ITF
- Highest ranking: No. 146 (5 July 2010)

Grand Slam singles results
- French Open: Q2 (2010)
- Wimbledon: Q3 (2010)
- US Open: Q2 (2012)

Doubles
- Career record: 58–71
- Career titles: 4 ITF
- Highest ranking: No. 148 (23 March 2015)

Beatriz García Vidagany (born 17 November 1988) is a retired Spanish tennis player.

She reached career-high WTA rankings of 146 in singles on 5 July 2010, and 148 in doubles on 23 March 2015. In her career, García Vidagany won two singles titles and four doubles titles on the ITF Women's Circuit.

== Career ==
At the 2010 Andalucia Tennis Experience, she achieved her first win over a top-100 player (No. 87 Kristina Barrois) and first WTA Tour main-draw win in her career. In her next round, she beat world No. 10, Kim Clijsters, 7–5, 4–6, 6–4 for her first ever top-ten win.

She retired from the professional tour in December 2015 due to persistent injuries.

== ITF Circuit finals ==
=== Singles: 7 (2–5) ===
Legend $50,000 tournaments $25,000 tournaments $10,000 tournaments	Finals by surface Hard (0–3) Clay (2–2) Carpet (0–0)

Result	W–L	Date	Tournament	Tier	Surface	Opponent	Score
Loss	0–1	Feb 2007	ITF Mallorca, Spain	10,000	Clay	(Germany) Tatjana Priachin	3–6, 3–6
Win	1–1	May 2008	ITF Tortosa, Spain	10,000	Clay	(United Kingdom) Amanda Carreras	6–2, 6–3
Win	2–1	Apr 2009	ITF Vic, Spain	10,000	Clay	(North Macedonia) Aleksandra Josifoska	2–6, 6–2, 6–2
Loss	2–2	Oct 2009	ITF Granada, Spain	25,000	Hard	(Argentina) María Irigoyen	7–5, 2–6, 4–3 ret.
Loss	2–3	Jun 2010	ITF Pozoblanco, Spain	50,000	Hard	(France) Olivia Sanchez	3–6, 4–6
Loss	2–4	May 2012	ITF Brescia, Italy	25,000	Hard	(Slovakia) Anna Karolína Schmiedlová	3–6, 2–6
Loss	2–5	Jul 2013	Contrexéville Open, France	50,000	Clay	(Switzerland) Timea Bacsinszky	1–6, 1–6

=== Doubles: 11 (4–7) ===
Legend $100,000 tournaments $75,000 tournaments $50,000 tournaments $25,000 tournaments $10,000 tournaments	Finals by surface Hard (0–0) Clay (4–7) Grass (0–0) Carpet (0–0)

Outcome	No.	Date	Tournament	Surface	Partner	Opponents	Score
Runner-up	1.	17 September 2006	ITF Lleida, Spain	Clay	(Spain) Irene Rehberger Bescos	(Spain) Rebeca Bou Nogueiro (Spain) Victoria Valls-Comamala	3–6, 1–6
Winner	1.	8 October 2006	ITF Granada, Spain	Clay	(Russia) Julia Parasyuk	(Spain) Carolina Gago Fuentes (Italy) Verdiana Verardi	6–4, 6–4
Winner	2.	29 October 2006	ITF Sant Cugat del Vallès, Spain	Clay	(Spain) Nuria Sánchez García	(Spain) Cristina Sánchez-Quintanar (Spain) Francisca Sintès Martín	3–6, 6–3, 6–3
Runner-up	2.	6 June 2009	ITF Galatina, Italy	Clay	(Argentina) María Emilia Salerni	(Russia) Elena Bovina (Russia) Regina Kulikova	2–6, 1–6
Runner-up	3.	11 November 2012	ITF Benicarló, Spain	Clay	(Venezuela) Andrea Gámiz	(Switzerland) Conny Perrin (Slovenia) Maša Zec Peškirič	4–6, 3–6
Runner-up	4.	9 September 2013	ITF Sofia, Bulgaria	Clay	(Hungary) Réka Luca Jani	(Bulgaria) Dia Evtimova (Bulgaria) Viktoriya Tomova	4–6, 6–2, [6–10]
Winner	3.	16 February 2014	ITF São Paulo, Brazil	Clay	(Germany) Dinah Pfizenmaier	(Colombia) Mariana Duque Marino (Brazil) Paula Cristina Gonçalves	7–6^{(6)}, 4–6, [10–8]
Runner-up	5.	5 May 2014	Nana Trophy, Tunisia	Clay	(Russia) Marina Melnikova	(Venezuela) Andrea Gámiz (Russia) Valeria Savinykh	4–6, 1–6
Winner	4.	2 June 2014	Open de Marseille, France	Clay	(Spain) Lourdes Domínguez Lino	(Ukraine) Yuliya Beygelzimer (Ukraine) Olga Savchuk	6–1, 6–2
Runner-up	6.	13 September 2014	Open de Saint-Malo, France	Clay	(Argentina) Tatiana Búa	(Italy) Giulia Gatto-Monticone (Italy) Anastasia Grymalska	3–6, 1–6
Runner-up	7.	8 March 2015	ITF Curitiba, Brazil	Clay	(Argentina) Florencia Molinero	(Belgium) Ysaline Bonaventure (Sweden) Rebecca Peterson	6–4, 3–6, [5–10]
