= Andalucia Tennis Experience =

Coordinates: 36°30′7″N 4°55′33″W

Defunct tennis tournament
- Founded: 2009
- Abolished: 2021
- Location: Marbella; Spain
- Venue: Club de Tenis Puente Romano
- Category: WTA International (2009-11); ATP 250 (2021)
- Surface: Red clay / outdoors
- Draw: 28M / 16Q / 16D
- Prize money: €408,800
- Website: Andalucia Tennis Experience

The Andalucia Tennis Experience was a professional women's tennis tournament played on outdoor clay courts. The inaugural edition was in 2009. The event is affiliated with the Women's Tennis Association (WTA) and is an International tournament on the WTA Tour. The scheduled 2012 edition was cancelled. In 2021, a one-off men's edition took place to fill up the void in ATP Tour calendar left due to the withdrawal of certain tournaments as a result of uncertainties caused by the COVID-19 pandemic.

== Past finals ==
=== Men's singles ===
Year	Champion	Runner-up	Score
2021	(Spain) Pablo Carreño Busta	(Spain) Jaume Munar	6–1, 2–6, 6–4

=== Women's singles ===
Year	Champion	Runner-up	Score
2009	(Serbia) Jelena Janković	(Spain) Carla Suárez Navarro	6–3, 3–6, 6–3
2010	(Italy) Flavia Pennetta	(Spain) Carla Suárez Navarro	6–2, 4–6, 6–3
2011	(Belarus) Victoria Azarenka	(Romania) Irina-Camelia Begu	6–3, 6–2

=== Men's doubles ===
Year	Champions	Runners-up	Score
2021	(Uruguay) Ariel Behar (Ecuador) Gonzalo Escobar	(Bosnia and Herzegovina) Tomislav Brkić (Serbia) Nikola Ćaćić	6–2, 6–4

=== Women's doubles ===
Year	Champions	Runners-up	Score
2009	(Poland) Klaudia Jans (Poland) Alicja Rosolska	(Spain) Anabel Medina Garrigues (Spain) Virginia Ruano Pascual	6–3, 6–3
2010	(Italy) Sara Errani (Italy) Roberta Vinci	(Russia) Maria Kondratieva (Kazakhstan) Yaroslava Shvedova	6–4, 6–2
2011	(Spain) Nuria Llagostera Vives (Spain) Arantxa Parra Santonja	(Italy) Sara Errani (Italy) Roberta Vinci	3–6, 6–4, [10–5]

== See also ==
- Marbella Tennis Open
